= Víctor Peña =

Peruvian footballer (born 1987)

Personal information
- Full name: Víctor Manuel Peña Espinoza
- Date of birth: 14 October 1987 (age 39)
- Place of birth: Huancayo, Peru
- Height: 1.65 m (5 ft 5 in)
- Position: Winger

Team information
- Current team: Alianza Universidad
- Number: 13

Youth career
- 2004–2005: Deportivo Ingeniería
- 2006: Academia Huancayo

Senior career*
Years	Team	Apps	(Gls)
2006	Asociación Deportiva Tarma	0	(0)
2007	Sport Águila	0	(0)
2008–2009	Sport Ancash	9	(0)
2010–2014	Leon de Huanuco	156	(9)
2015–2020	Sport Huancayo	199	(16)
2021–	Alianza Universidad	11	(0)
- * Club domestic league appearances and goals as of 19:26, 3 October 2021 (UTC) ‡ National team caps and goals as of 3 October 2021

Víctor Manuel Peña Espinoza (14 October 1987) is a Peruvian professional footballer who plays as a right winger for Alianza Universidad in the Peruvian Primera División.

Víctor Peña emerged from the youth categories of the Deportivo Ingeniería and Huancayo Academy after his years in the youth teams, he was signed in 2006 by the Asociación Deportiva Tarma (ADT Tarma). After his first beginnings with ADT Tarma signed in the following season for Sport Águila where, due to his good performance, he was signed by Club Sport Áncash in 2008, a team with which he managed to play his first international tournament, the Copa Sudamericana (South American Cup). The following season he signed for Club Social Deportivo León de Huánuco (CD León de Huánuco), playing 5 seasons and scoring 9 goals and 9 assists in 156 games. In 2015 he signed for Club Sport Huancayo where he played for 5 seasons scoring 16 goals and 19 assists in 199 games. In 2021 he signed for Club Alianza Universidad de Huánuco as a reinforcement of the club for one season.

== Career ==
=== Beginnings and first clubs ===
Peña was born in Huancayo, Peru. He was trained at Deportivo Ingeniería (2004-2005) and Academia Huancayo (2006). Later he signed for the ADT Tarma where he was under the baton of Delia López Sueldo, daughter of Ricardo López Otero, former president who took the team to the professional in 1979. In 2007 he went to Club Sport Águila at free cost, then through the same process to the Club Sport Ancash debuting in the Clausura on 17 August against Club Deportivo Universidad César Vallejo playing 20 minutes. Then he played the Copa Sudamericana against Club Deportivo Ñublense S.D.A.P on 16 September 2008 for the return of the first round entering through Ronaille Calheira at minute 51.

=== Club León de Huánuco ===
In 2009 its value grew to $ 100,000, being transferred free at the beginning of 2010 to CD León de Huánuco where he made his starting debut against Alianza Lima playing 74 minutes and being replaced by Luis García. On 25 April, he scored a goal in the 1–0 victory against FBC Melgar where he started and received a double yellow and was sent off where he could not play the next game against Alianza Atlético. On 30 May, he scored a goal against Club Alianza Lima in a 4-3 defeat where he received a yellow. On 3 July 2010, he gave an assist to Luis Perea in the 1–1 draw against Colegio Nacional Iquitos. In the Torneo Descentralizado on 11 September he made his debut against Sport Huancayo where he drew 0-0. On 26 September, he scored a goal in the 2-1 victory over the visiting Cienciano. On 16 October he participated in his team's 3–1 victory against Melgar where he gave two assists, one to Luis Perea for 1–0 and another to Gianfranco Espinoza for 3–1. On 31 October, he gave an assist to Carlos Zegarra after a cross in the 2–0 victory against Sport Huancayo. His team finished second in the table with 56 points behind the Club Deportivo Universidad de San Martín de Porres (San Martin) who had 64 points. Both teams played the final. of the play-offs where Peña started in the two games (round trip) where a 3–1 aggregate for San Martin remained. In total he played 41 games throughout the season, scoring 3 goals and giving 4 assists.

In the 2011 season he debuted in the Torneo Descentralizado on 12 February against Inti Gas, which ended with a 1–0 defeat. Last season, his team qualified for Libertadores where they formed Group B and debuted on 17 February against Junior where they lost 2–1. On 23 February, he gave an assist to Carlos Zegarra to score the only goal of the game and it would be his team's only victory in the group stage against Oriente Petrolero. On 22 May he made his debut in the Torneo Descentralizado (primera división) game against Cienciano where his team won 4–0. He met again with the goal on 6 November against Alianza Lima, scoring 2 goals and at the same time was booked in the 18th minute for his celebration. 34 games, scored 3 goals and gave 1 assist.

In the 2012 season he debuted on the second date against Inti Gas as a starter where his team won 1–0. 23 On 1 August 2012, he made his debut in the Copa Sudamericana against Deportivo Quito in Ecuador where his team lost 1-0 and on 23 August, August he played the second round of the first round losing 3–2 at home, and was also booked in the 58th minute, losing 4–2 on aggregate. His team finished eighth in the table with 40 points and playing 9 games in which he did not score goals or give assists.

In the 2013 season he competed in the Torneo Descentralizado against Inti Gas in a 2–0 defeat. On 2 June, he was fouled in the 87th minute promoting a penalty taken by Carlos Solís for the 3–0 defeat against Deportivo Pacifico. His team finished sixth in the Peruvian Primera División with 45 points. On 31 August he made his debut in Liguilla A against San Martin where he lost his team 1–0. On 16 November he scored his first goal of the season against Cienciano on the 12th date where his team drew 1–1. His team He finished fourth in the table with 11 points in League A where he scored 1 goal. Víctor Peña played 33 games where he scored 1 goal and gave 1 assist throughout the season.

In the 2014 season, he debuted on 23 February 2014 in the Summer Tournament against Sporting Cristal as a starter where his team lost 3–0. On 18 May he scored his first goal on the last date of the tournament against Unión Comercio where his team won 4–3, in that game he was booked in the 73rd minute. On 7 June, he made his debut in the Apertura tournament against Real Garcilaso as a starter. where his team lost 3–1. On 26 July he gave an assist in the Apertura tournament of that year against Cienciano where his team drew 2–2. On 24 August he attended again this time against Club Universitario de Deportes (Universitario), where his team won 2–1, he was booked in that game in the 86th minute. For the Clausura tournament he made his debut on 6 September against Real Garcilaso where his team drew 1–1. On 23 November he scored a double against Universitario, the first from outside the area and the second in the 90+5 minute. His last game of the season was played against Inti Gas where his team lost 5–2. His team finished fifth in the table a with 23 points in the closing where he scored 2 goals. Peña played 39 games that season in which he scored 2 goals and gave 3 assists.

=== Sport Huancayo ===
In the 2015 season, Peña signed for Sport Huancayo. In a 2–1 win against Ayacucho, he received a double yellow without being able to play the next date against Unión Comercio.
