= Roberto Tristán =

Peruvian football manager (born 1983)

Personal information
- Full name: Roberto Carlos Tristán Jorges
- Date of birth: 6 May 1983 (age 43)
- Place of birth: Chincha Alta, Peru
- Position: Defender

Team information
- Current team: Deportivo Garcilaso (reserves manager)

Senior career*
Years	Team	Apps	(Gls)
2007	Sport Águila		
2008	Sport Huamanga		
2009	León de Huánuco		
2010	Defensor San José		
2011	Universidad Ucayali		
2012	Alianza Universidad		
2013	Sport Victoria	5	(0)

Managerial career
- 2015: Sport La Vid (assistant)
- 2016: Sport Manchete
- 2017: Sport La Vid
- 2018: ADT
- 2018: León de Huánuco
- 2019: Deportivo Llacuabamba
- 2020: ADT
- 2021: León de Huánuco
- 2021: Deportivo Verdecocha
- 2022: Inkas FC
- 2022–2023: Deportivo Garcilaso
- 2023–: Deportivo Garcilaso (reserves)
- * Club domestic league appearances and goals

Roberto Carlos Tristán Jorges (born 6 May 1983) is a Peruvian football manager and former player who played as a defender. He is the current manager of Deportivo Garcilaso's reserve team.

== Playing career ==
Born in Chincha Alta, Tristán never played in any higher than Segunda División during his career. He represented Sport Águila, Sport Huamanga, León de Huánuco, Defensor San José, Universidad Ucayali, Alianza Universidad and Sport Victoria, winning the Copa Perú with León in 2009.

== Managerial career ==
After being an assistant of Mifflin Bermúdez at Sport La Vid in 2015, Tristán was named manager of Sport Huancayo's reserve team Sport Manchete for the 2016 season. In 2017, he returned to Sport La Vid.

On 21 March 2018, Tristán was named in charge of ADT. On 10 May, he replaced Bermúdez at the helm of León de Huánuco, before taking over Deportivo Llacuabamba for the 2019 campaign.

Tristán left Llacuabamba on 5 December 2019, after winning the Copa Perú. He returned to ADT the following 13 January, before returning to León on 12 August 2021.

On 6 September 2021, Tristán was appointed Deportivo Verdecocha manager. He started the 2022 season in charge of Inkas FC, being knocked out in the semifinals of the provincial leagues by Deportivo Garcilaso after fielding an ineligible player; on 6 July of that year, he took over Garcilaso.

Tristán led Garcilaso to the top tier, but was sacked on 16 April 2023; late in the month, he was announced back at the club, but as manager of the reserves.

== Honours ==
=== Player ===
León de Huánuco

- Copa Perú: 2009

=== Manager ===
Deportivo Llacuabamba

- Copa Perú: 2019

Deportivo Garcilaso

- Copa Perú: 2022
