= Javier Tetes =

Uruguayan footballer (born 1983)

Personal information
- Full name: Javier Antonio Tetes Ferreyra
- Date of birth: 29 May 1983 (age 43)
- Place of birth: Montevideo, Uruguay
- Height: 1.80 m (5 ft 11 in)
- Position: Defender

Team information
- Current team: Nacional (assistant coach)

Youth career
- Defensor Sporting

Senior career*
Years	Team	Apps	(Gls)
2004–2005	Defensor Sporting	0	(0)
2006–2009	Miramar Misiones	72	(0)
2009–2010	Boston River	12	(1)
2010	Bella Vista	12	(1)
2011	Santiago Wanderers	14	(0)
2011–2013	Central Español	36	(0)
2014–2015	Villa Española	15	(0)
Total		161	(2)

Managerial career
- 2018: Danubio (assistant)
- 2019–2021: Carlos A. Mannucci (assistant)
- 2022–2023: Cusco (assistant)
- 2023–2025: Santa Fe (assistant)
- 2025–: Nacional (assistant)
- * Club domestic league appearances and goals

Javier Antonio Tetes Ferreyra (born 29 May 1983) is a Uruguayan former footballer who played as a defender.

== Teams ==
- (Uruguay) Defensor Sporting 2004–2005
- (Uruguay) Miramar Misiones 2006–2009
- (Uruguay) Boston River 2009–2010
- (Uruguay) Bella Vista 2010
- (Chile) Santiago Wanderers 2011
- (Uruguay) Central Español 2011–2013
- (Uruguay) Villa Española 2014–2015

== Coaching career ==
Tetes has mainly served as assistant coach of Pablo Peirano. In April 2025, they assumed in Nacional.
