= Steven Rivadeneyra =

Peruvian association football player

Personal information
- Full name: Steven Aldair Rivadeneyra del Villar
- Date of birth: 2 November 1994 (age 32)
- Place of birth: Lima, Peru
- Height: 1.90 m (6 ft 3 in)
- Position: Goalkeeper

Team information
- Current team: Alianza Atlético (on loan from Sport Boys)
- Number: 31

Youth career
- Esther Grande
- 2012–2013: Juan Aurich

Senior career*
| Years | Team | Apps | (Gls) |
| 2014 | Juan Aurich | 10 | (0) |
| 2015–2016 | Universidad San Martín | 7 | (0) |
| 2017 | Alianza Atlético | 27 | (0) |
| 2018–2019 | Deportivo Municipal | 63 | (0) |
| 2020 | Deportivo Binacional | 0 | (0) |
| 2020–2021 | Alianza Lima | 15 | (0) |
| 2022 | Carlos A. Mannucci | 8 | (0) |
| 2023 | Deportivo Municipal | 23 | (0) |
| 2024– | Sport Boys | 66 | (0) |
| 2026– | → Alianza Atlético (loan) | 9 | (0) |
- * Club domestic league appearances and goals as of 11:58, 14 September 2026 (UTC)

Steven Aldair Rivadeneyra del Villar (born 2 November 1994) is a Peruvian footballer who plays as a goalkeeper for Alianza Atlético, on loan from Sport Boys.

He has made over 225 appearances in the Peruvian Primera División for seven clubs, winning the 2021 title at Alianza Lima. He was called up for the Peru national football team in 2014 and went to the 2015 Pan American Games.

== Club career ==
=== Early career ===
Born in Lima to a military father and an accountant mother, Rivadeneyra was raised in the neighbourhood of Mariano Melgar in Arequipa. He began playing as a goalkeeper but was put as a forward once his team was winning.

Rivadeneyra's first academy was Cristal de Arequipa, associated with Esther Grande, and he moved back to the capital to play for that club. After playing a friendly against the reserve team of Juan Aurich, he moved to the Chiclayo-based team in 2012 as they had a professional team. After two years in the reserves, his professional debut came on 7 June 2014 in a 2–1 home win over San Simón in the Peruvian Primera División. He was playing due to injury to Erick Delgado.

After spells at Universidad San Martín and Alianza Atlético, Rivadeneyra signed for Deportivo Municipal in 2018. That November, he extended his contract for another year. He was linked with Alianza Lima after helping his club qualify for the Copa Sudamericana. In the first round, his team lost 5–0 on aggregate to Colón of Argentina.

=== Alianza Lima ===
In December 2019 Rivadeneyra signed for reigning champions Deportivo Binacional, their first signing since winning the title against Alianza. He cancelled his contract at the club from Juliaca within a month and moved to Alianza for two years, arriving to replace Pedro Gallese, who had moved abroad.

Despite being expected to fight for the title, Alianza were relegated in 2020 before being reinstated due to Carlos Stein's point deduction. Rivadeneyra said he used a sports psychologist to deal with the poor year, and the team subsequently won the league a year later.

=== Later career ===
In November 2021, Rivadeneyra signed for Carlos A. Mannucci for the coming season. Having played only 8 games and conceded 15 goals, he moved a year later back to Deportivo Municipal.

Deportivo Municipal and Rivadeneyra performed well in the first half of 2023, but administrative issues and poor results led to relegation, and he left in October. In December, he signed for Sport Boys. On 6 July 2026, having played twice in the first half of the season, he was loaned to Alianza Atlético for the second half.

== International career ==
In July 2014, Peru national football team manager Pablo Bengoechea called up Rivadeneyra for a friendly against Panama the following month. He was unused as Gallese played the 3–0 win at the National Stadium of Peru.

Rivadeneyra was also called up for the under-22 team at the football event at the 2015 Pan American Games in Canada.

== Honours ==
Alianza Lima

- Liga 1: 2021
