= Gonzalo Rizzo =

Uruguayan football player (born 1995)

Personal information
- Full name: Gonzalo Nicolás Rizzo Sánchez
- Date of birth: 27 December 1995 (age 30)
- Place of birth: Montevideo, Uruguay
- Height: 1.89 m (6 ft 2 in)
- Position: Centre back

Team information
- Current team: Carlos A. Mannucci
- Number: 24

Youth career
- –2015: Rentistas

Senior career*
Years	Team	Apps	(Gls)
2015–2018	Rentistas	5	(0)
2016	→ Progreso (loan)	13	(0)
2017	→ Rampla Juniors (loan)	12	(0)
2018–2019	Rampla Juniors	58	(4)
2020	Carlos A. Mannucci	24	(2)
2021–	Cusco	23	(5)
- * Club domestic league appearances and goals as of 30 October 2021

Gonzalo Nicolás Rizzo Sánchez (born 27 December 1995) is a Uruguayan footballer who plays as a defender for Carlos A. Mannucci in the Peruvian Segunda División.

== Career statistics ==
=== Club ===
As of 29 October 2023.

Club	Division	Season	League		Cup		Continental		Total	
Club	Division	Season	Apps	Goals	Apps	Goals	Apps	Goals	Apps	Goals
Rentistas	Uruguayan Primera División	2015	1	0	—		—		1	0
Progreso	Uruguayan Segunda División	2016	13	0	—		—		13	0
Rampla Juniors	Uruguayan Primera División	2017	12	0	—		—		12	0
Rampla Juniors	Uruguayan Primera División	2018	25	3	—		4	0	29	3
Rampla Juniors	Uruguayan Primera División	2019	33	1	—		—		33	1
Rampla Juniors	Total		70	4	0	0	4	0	74	4
Carlos A. Mannucci	Peruvian Primera División	2020	24	2	—		—		24	2
Cusco	Peruvian Primera División	2021	23	5	2	0	—		25	5
Rentistas	Uruguayan Primera División	2022	15	0	1	0	—		16	0
Rentistas	Total		16	0	1	0	0	0	17	0
ADT	Peruvian Primera División	2023	34	4	—		—		34	4
Career total			180	15	3	0	4	0	187	15
