= Isac Talancha =

Peruvian footballer (born 2003)

Personal information
- Full name: Isac Elías Talancha Loyola
- Date of birth: 9 December 2003 (age 22)
- Place of birth: Huánuco, Peru
- Position: Midfielder

Team information
- Current team: Alianza Universidad
- Number: 38

Youth career
- Escuela de Fútbol Bernabéu
- –2021: Miguel Grau UDH

Senior career*
Years	Team	Apps	(Gls)
2021–	Alianza Universidad	2	(0)
- * Club domestic league appearances and goals as of 05:00, 25 July 2021 (UTC)

Isac Elías Talancha Loyola (born 9 December 2003) is a Peruvian footballer who plays as a midfielder for Peruvian Primera División club Alianza Universidad.

== Career statistics ==
=== Club ===
As of 25 July 2021.

Club	Season	League			Cup		Continental		Other		Total	
Club	Season	Division	Apps	Goals	Apps	Goals	Apps	Goals	Apps	Goals	Apps	Goals
Alianza Universidad	2021	Peruvian Primera División	2	0	0	0	0	0	0	0	2	0
Career total			2	0	0	0	0	0	0	0	2	0
