= Teddy Cardama =

Peruvian football manager (born 1966)

Personal information
- Full name: Teddy Armando Cardama Sinti
- Date of birth: 15 August 1966 (age 60)
- Place of birth: Iquitos, Peru
- Position: Defender

Youth career
- Sporting Cristal

Senior career*
Years	Team	Apps	(Gls)
1984–1986	Sporting Cristal		
1987	UTC		
1988–1989	Atlético Grau		
1989–1990	Sporting Cristal		

Managerial career
- Sporting Cristal (youth)
- 1996–1997: Coronel Bolognesi
- 1997–1999: Alianza Atlético
- 1999–2000: Peru U23
- 2000: Peru (assistant)
- 2000: Sport Boys
- 2001: Universitario
- 2002: Alianza Atlético
- 2002: Cienciano
- 2003–2004: Alianza Atlético
- 2005–2006: Melgar
- 2006: José Gálvez
- 2007–2010: Alianza Atlético
- 2011–2012: Cobresol
- 2012: León de Huánuco
- 2013–2014: Los Caimanes
- 2015: Alianza Atlético
- 2016–2017: Carlos A. Mannucci
- 2018: León de Huánuco
- 2020: Alianza Atlético
- 2020–2021: Sport Boys
- 2021: Alianza Atlético
- 2022: Juan Aurich
- * Club domestic league appearances and goals

Teddy Armando Cardama Sinti (born 15 August 1966) is a Peruvian football manager and former player who played as a defender.

== Playing career ==
Cardama was born in Iquitos, and was a Sporting Cristal youth graduate. After making his first team debut in 1984, he moved to UTC in 1987.

In 1989, after playing for Atlético Grau, Cardama returned to Sporting Cristal. He retired in the following year at the age of just 23, due to a knee injury.

== Managerial career ==
After retiring, Cardama started working as a manager in his last team Sporting Cristal's youth setup. His first senior experience occurred in 1996, with Copa Perú side Coronel Bolognesi.

In September 1999, after a two-year spell at Alianza Atlético, Cardama was named manager of the Peru under-23 national team. Despite failing to qualify for the 2000 Summer Olympics, he was named assistant of Francisco Maturana in the full side on 3 February 2000.

On 20 September 2000, Cardama was appointed in charge of Sport Boys. He was subsequently in charge of Universitario during the 2001 campaign, before returning to Alianza Atlético for the 2002 season; in that year, he was also manager of Cienciano.

Cardama returned to Alianza Atlético in 2003, but left on a mutual agreement on 10 November 2004. He was named at the helm of Melgar in 2005, but was sacked on 5 April 2006.

In 2007, after a short period at José Gálvez, Cardama rejoined Alianza for a fourth spell. He narrowly avoided relegation with the club in 2009, but was still dismissed on 8 April 2010.

Cardama was named manager of Cobresol on 13 January 2011, but was relieved of his duties on 30 April of the following year. He took over León de Huánuco on 24 September 2012, and left the club at the end of the season.

Cardama was in charge of Los Caimanes in the 2013 campaign, helping the club win the Segunda División and achieve a first-ever promotion to the top tier. He was dismissed on 21 August 2014, and agreed to a return to Alianza Atlético on 6 December.

Replaced by Gustavo Roverano for the 2016 season, Cardama was appointed manager of Carlos A. Mannucci on 6 October of that year. After leaving in May 2017, he stayed for more than three years without a club before returning to Sport Boys after 20 years on 23 September 2020.

== Honours ==
=== Manager ===
Los Caimanes

- Peruvian Segunda División: 2013
