= Mifflin Bermúdez =

Peruvian football manager (born 1968)

Personal information
- Full name: Mifflin Bermúdez Tucto
- Date of birth: 4 February 1968 (age 58)
- Place of birth: Huánuco, Peru
- Height: 1.59 m (5 ft 3 in)
- Position: Attacking midfielder

Senior career*
Years	Team	Apps	(Gls)
1987–1990	León de Huánuco		
1991	Unión Minas		
1992–1993	León de Huánuco		
1994–1996	Unión Minas		
1997	La Loretana		
1998	Unión Minas		
1999	Melgar		
2000–2002	Unión Minas		
2003	Deportivo Junín		

Managerial career
- 2003: Deportivo Junín (player-manager)
- 2003: Columna Pasco
- 2006–2007: Sport Águila
- 2008: Sport Huancayo
- 2008: Sport Águila
- 2009: León de Huánuco
- 2009–2010: ADT
- 2010–2012: Alianza Universidad
- 2013: Sport Victoria
- 2014: Alianza Universidad
- 2014: Unión Pichanaki
- 2015: Sport Águila
- 2015: Sport La Vid
- 2016–2017: Alianza Universidad
- 2018: León de Huánuco
- 2018: Huamantanga
- 2019–2022: Sport Huancayo (reserves)
- 2019: Sport Huancayo (interim)
- 2022–2023: Sport Huancayo
- 2023: Sport Huancayo (reserves)
- 2024: Sport Huancayo (interim)
- 2025: Alianza Universidad
- 2025: Miguel Grau UDH
- * Club domestic league appearances and goals

Mifflin Bermúdez Tucto (born 4 February 1968) is a Peruvian football manager and former player who played as an attacking midfielder.

== Playing career ==
Born in Huánuco, Bermúdez was named after Ramón Mifflin, and began his career with hometown side León de Huánuco in 1987. He also represented Unión Minas, La Loretana and Melgar, and opted to retire from professional football in 2002 after Minas suffered relegation.

== Managerial career ==
Bermúdez began his managerial career in 2003, acting as a player-manager at Deportivo Junín. In 2007, he led Sport Águila to the Copa Perú finals, but lost to Juan Aurich.

Bermúdez was subsequently in charge of several Copa Perú and Segunda División sides, before joining Sport Huancayo in 2019 as manager of the reserve team. On 9 August 2022, he was named interim manager of the first team after Carlos Desio was sacked.

On 25 August 2022, Bermúdez was permanently appointed manager of Huancayo.
