= Vito Andrés Bártoli =

Argentine footballer and manager (1929–2019)

Personal information
- Date of birth: 25 May 1929
- Place of birth: Buenos Aires, Argentina
- Date of death: 24 January 2019 (aged 89)
- Position: Midfielder

Senior career*
Years	Team	Apps	(Gls)
1953–1954	Unión Magdalena		
1955–1957	Atlético Chalaco		
1959	Sporting Cristal		
1960	Atlético Chalaco		
1961	Independiente Medellín		
1961–1962	Deportivo Cali		
1963–1965	Deportes Quindío		
1966	Club Carlos Concha		

Managerial career
- 1968–1969: Juan Aurich
- 1969–1971: Sporting Cristal
- 1971–1972: Unión Tumán
- 1973: Alianza Lima
- 1974: Juan Aurich
- 1975: León de Huánuco
- 1976: Universitario
- 1977–1978: Deportes Quindío
- 1979: Deportivo Municipal
- 1980: ADT
- 1983: Atlético Chalaco
- 1984–1985: Los Espartanos
- 1986: Deportivo Pucallpa
- 1986: Atlético Torino
- 1987: Los Espartanos
- 1988: Alianza Atlético
- 1989: Sport Boys
- 1990–1996: Alianza Atlético
- 1997: Alcides Vigo
- 2002: Juan Aurich
- * Club domestic league appearances and goals

Vito Andrés Bártoli (25 May 1929 – 24 January 2019) was an Argentine footballer and manager.

He was the only coach to have won all three major championships in Peru.

== Biography ==
=== Playing career ===
Bártoli established himself in Colombia with the club Unión Magdalena, where he was nicknamed "Sabino." He was bought by Atlético Chalaco in 1955 and won two championships in Peruvian football leagues. He played for various teams in the late 1950s and early to mid-1960s. He spent his final season with the Peruvian Club Carlos Concha in 1966, who would be relegated at the end of the season.

=== Coaching career ===
Bártoli spent all of his coaching career in Peru, with the exception of a 2-year stint with the Colombian club Deportes Quindío. He led the club Juan Aurich to a second-place finish in the 1968 championships, turning around a team that had been subpar for so long. He won the Peruvian championship in 1970 with Sporting Cristal. He won the Copa Perú in 1984 with Los Espartanos. In 1989, the Bártoli-led Sport Boys won the 2nd Division Championship, Bártoli's third title overall. Throughout the 1990s Bártoli would lead Alianza Atlético. He spent his final season as a coach in 2002 with Juan Aurich.

=== Death ===
Nearly 17 years after retirement, Vito Andrés Bártoli died on 24 January 2019 at the age of 89.
