= Jorge Arteaga (footballer, born 1966) =

Peruvian footballer

Personal information
- Full name: Jorge Fausto Arteaga Castillo
- Date of birth: 29 December 1966 (age 59)
- Place of birth: Lima, Peru
- Height: 1.76 m (5 ft 9 in)
- Position: Defender

Senior career*
Years	Team	Apps	(Gls)
1986–1993	Sporting Cristal		
1994	Sport Boys		
1995	Deportivo Municipal	28	(2)
1996	Melgar	26	(2)
1997	Alianza Atlético	26	(0)
1998	Melgar	40	(1)
1999–2000	Juan Aurich		

International career
1989–1993	Peru	19	(0)
- * Club domestic league appearances and goals

Jorge Fausto Arteaga Castillo (born 29 December 1966) is a retired Peruvian international footballer.

== Career ==
Born in Lima, Peru, Arteaga played for local giants Sporting Cristal and several other clubs in Peru. Arteaga made 19 appearances for the Peru national football team from 1989 to 1993. He participated in the 1991 Copa América and helped his country to the quarterfinals in the 1993 edition in Ecuador.
