= 1987 Peruvian División Intermedia =

División Intermedia
- Season: 1987

The División Intermedia, the second division of Peruvian football (soccer) in 1984 until 1987. The tournament was played on a home-and-away, round-robin basis.

== Metropolitan Region ==
=== Intermedia A ===
Pos	Team	Pld	W	D	L	GF	GA	GD	Pts	Qualification or relegation
1	AELU	0	0	0	0	0	0	0	0	1988 Torneo Descentralizado
2	Internazionale	0	0	0	0	0	0	0	0	1988 Torneo Descentralizado
3	Octavio Espinosa	0	0	0	0	0	0	0	0	1988 Torneo Descentralizado
4	Juventud La Joya	0	0	0	0	0	0	0	0	1988 Torneo Descentralizado
5	Juventud La Palma	0	0	0	0	0	0	0	0	Repechaje
6	Walter Ormeño	0	0	0	0	0	0	0	0	1988 Segunda División
7	Sport Boys	0	0	0	0	0	0	0	0	1988 Segunda División
8	Defensor Lima	0	0	0	0	0	0	0	0	1988 Segunda División
9	CITEN	0	0	0	0	0	0	0	0	1988 Segunda División
10	ETE	0	0	0	0	0	0	0	0	1988 Segunda División

=== Intermedia B ===
==== North ====
Pos	Team	Pld	W	D	L	GF	GA	GD	Pts	Qualification or relegation
1	Alcides Vigo	0	0	0	0	0	0	0	0	Liguilla de Promoción
2	Hijos de Yurimaguas	0	0	0	0	0	0	0	0	Liguilla de Promoción
3	Atlético Chalaco	0	0	0	0	0	0	0	0	Liguilla de Promoción
4	Juventud Progreso	0	0	0	0	0	0	0	0	1988 Segunda División
5	Aurora Miraflores	0	0	0	0	0	0	0	0	1988 Segunda División
6	Grumete Medina	0	0	0	0	0	0	0	0	1988 Segunda División

==== South ====
Pos	Team	Pld	W	D	L	GF	GA	GD	Pts	Qualification or relegation
1	Guardia Republicana	0	0	0	0	0	0	0	0	Liguilla de Promoción
2	Lawn Tennis	0	0	0	0	0	0	0	0	Liguilla de Promoción
3	ENAPU	0	0	0	0	0	0	0	0	Liguilla de Promoción
4	Deportivo Aviación	0	0	0	0	0	0	0	0	1988 Segunda División
5	Independiente	0	0	0	0	0	0	0	0	1988 Segunda División
6	Once Estrellas	0	0	0	0	0	0	0	0	1988 Segunda División
7	Esther Grande	0	0	0	0	0	0	0	0	1988 Segunda División
8	Santos	0	0	0	0	0	0	0	0	Ligas Departamentales

=== Liguilla de Promoción ===
Pos	Team	Pld	W	D	L	GF	GA	GD	Pts	Qualification or relegation
1	Guardia Republicana	0	0	0	0	0	0	0	0	Repechaje
2	Alcides Vigo	0	0	0	0	0	0	0	0	1988 Segunda División
3	Hijos de Yurimaguas	0	0	0	0	0	0	0	0	1988 Segunda División
4	Atlético Chalaco	0	0	0	0	0	0	0	0	1988 Segunda División
5	Lawn Tennis	0	0	0	0	0	0	0	0	1988 Segunda División
6	ENAPU	0	0	0	0	0	0	0	0	1988 Segunda División

=== Repechaje ===
Pos	Team	Pld	W	D	L	GF	GA	GD	Pts	Qualification or relegation
1	Guardia Republicana	0	0	0	0	0	0	0	0	1988 Torneo Descentralizado
2	Juventud La Palma	0	0	0	0	0	0	0	0	1988 Segunda División

== North Region ==
Pos	Team	Pld	W	D	L	GF	GA	GD	Pts	Qualification or relegation
1	Alianza Atlético	0	0	0	0	0	0	0	0	1988 Torneo Descentralizado
2	Atlético Grau	0	0	0	0	0	0	0	0	1988 Torneo Descentralizado
3	15 de Setiembre	0	0	0	0	0	0	0	0	1988 Torneo Descentralizado
4	Juan Aurich	0	0	0	0	0	0	0	0	1988 Torneo Descentralizado
5	Deportivo Cañaña	0	0	0	0	0	0	0	0	1988 Torneo Descentralizado
6	Atlético Torino	0	0	0	0	0	0	0	0	Ligas Departamentales
7	Estudiantes Casanovistas	0	0	0	0	0	0	0	0	Ligas Departamentales
8	UNP	0	0	0	0	0	0	0	0	Ligas Departamentales

== Center Region ==
Pos	Team	Pld	W	D	L	GF	GA	GD	Pts	Qualification or relegation
1	ADT	0	0	0	0	0	0	0	0	1987 Torneo Descentralizado
2	León de Huánuco	0	0	0	0	0	0	0	0	1987 Torneo Descentralizado
3	Alipio Ponce	0	0	0	0	0	0	0	0	1987 Torneo Descentralizado
4	Mina San Vicente	0	0	0	0	0	0	0	0	1987 Torneo Descentralizado
5	Defensor ANDA	0	0	0	0	0	0	0	0	1987 Torneo Descentralizado
6	Social Magdalena	0	0	0	0	0	0	0	0	Ligas Departamentales
7	Universidad San Cristóbal	0	0	0	0	0	0	0	0	Ligas Departamentales
8	Mariano Melgar	0	0	0	0	0	0	0	0	Ligas Departamentales

== South Region ==
Pos	Team	Pld	W	D	L	GF	GA	GD	Pts	Qualification or relegation
1	Melgar	0	0	0	0	0	0	0	0	1988 Torneo Descentralizado
2	Alianza Naval	0	0	0	0	0	0	0	0	1988 Torneo Descentralizado
3	Atlético Huracán	0	0	0	0	0	0	0	0	1988 Torneo Descentralizado
4	Diablos Rojos	0	0	0	0	0	0	0	0	1988 Torneo Descentralizado
5	Deportivo Tintaya	0	0	0	0	0	0	0	0	1988 Torneo Descentralizado
6	Juvenil Los Ángeles	0	0	0	0	0	0	0	0	Ligas Departamentales
7	Mariscal Nieto	0	0	0	0	0	0	0	0	Ligas Departamentales
8	Centauro Guardia Republicana	0	0	0	0	0	0	0	0	Ligas Departamentales
