= Diego Agurto =

Peruvian footballer and manager (1927–2002)

Personal information
- Full name: Diego Agurto Vilela
- Date of birth: 13 November 1927
- Place of birth: Talara, Peru
- Date of death: 1 July 2002 (aged 74)
- Position: Centre back

Senior career*
Years	Team	Apps	(Gls)
1950–1958	Sport Boys		

International career
1952	Peru		

Managerial career
- 1968: Sport Boys
- 1969: Porvenir Miraflores
- 1970: Octavio Espinosa
- 1971: Atlético Torino
- 1972: Deportivo SIMA
- 1973: Unión Tumán
- 1973: José Gálvez FBC
- 1974: Sport Boys
- 1974–1975: Unión Huaral
- 1976: Deportivo Junín
- 1976–1977: Sporting Cristal
- 1977: Alfonso Ugarte (Puno)
- 1978: Atlético Torino
- 1979: Juventud La Palma
- 1979: Unión Huaral
- 1980–1981: Atlético Torino
- 1982–1983: Atlético Chalaco
- 1983–1984: ADT
- 1985: Juventud La Joya
- 1985: Huancayo FC
- 1986–1987: Cienciano
- 1989: Deportivo AELU
- 1991–1992: León de Huánuco
- 1994–1995: Atlético Torino
- 1998–1999: IMI Talara
- * Club domestic league appearances and goals

Diego Agurto Vilela (13 November 1927 – 1 July 2002) is a Peruvian football manager and former player.

== Playing career ==
Arriving at Sport Boys in 1950 on the recommendation of his brother Enrique Agurto, a player for the club, Diego Agurto made his debut at the age of 23 in central defense, a position he would hold until the end of his career. He won the Peruvian championship with Sport Boys twice, in 1951 and 1958.

A Peruvian international, Agurto played two matches against Panama (a 7–1 victory) and Uruguay (a 2–5 defeat) in the 1952 Panamerican Championship in Santiago, Chile.

== Managerial career ==
After becoming a coach, Diego Agurto managed Sport Boys in 1968, and again six years later. In 1974, at the helm of Unión Huaral, he led the team to the Peruvian league runner-up title and participated in the 1975 Copa Libertadores. The following year, he took charge of Sporting Cristal.

With Atlético Torino—his hometown club—which he managed on several occasions, he finished as Peruvian league runner-up for the second time in 1980, but had to wait until 1994 to win his first title, the Copa Perú. He secured a second Copa Perú with another Talara club, IMI Talara, in 1998. This would be his final coaching experience before his death on 1 July 2002.

== Honours ==
=== Player ===
Sport Boys

- Peruvian Primera División (2): 1951, 1958

=== Manager ===
Atlético Torino

- Copa Perú: 1994

IMI Talara

- Copa Perú: 1998
