= Wilmar Valencia =

Peruvian football manager (born 1961)

Personal information
- Full name: Wilmar Elar Valencia Pacheco
- Date of birth: 27 October 1961 (age 65)
- Place of birth: Camaná, Peru
- Height: 1.83 m (6 ft 0 in)
- Position: Centre back

Senior career*
| Years | Team | Apps | (Gls) |
| 1979–1981 | Coronel Bolognesi | | |
| 1982–1987 | Alianza Lima | | |
| 1987 | Atlético Marte | | |
| 1988 | Alianza Lima | | |
| 1989 | Blooming | | |
| 1990–1994 | Alianza Lima | | |
| 2001 | Aurora Chancayllo | | |

International career
| 1984–1989 | Peru | 14 | (0) |

Managerial career
- 2000: Unión Huaral
- 2001–2003: Sporting Cristal (youth)
- 2003–2004: Sporting Cristal
- 2005: Alianza Lima
- 2006: Cienciano
- 2010: Total Chalaco
- 2011: Melgar
- 2012: José Gálvez
- 2012: Sport Huancayo
- 2013: Alianza Lima
- 2014: León de Huánuco
- 2015: Sport Huancayo
- 2016: Real Garcilaso
- 2017: Juan Aurich
- 2018: Sport Boys
- 2019: Atlético Grau
- 2020–2021: Sport Huancayo
- 2022–2023: Binacional
- 2023–2024: Sport Huancayo
- 2024: ADT
- * Club domestic league appearances and goals

Wilmar Elar Valencia Pacheco (born 27 October 1961) is a Peruvian football manager and former player who played as a central defender.

== Playing career ==
Born Camaná, Valencia started playing for Coronel Bolognesi. In 1982, he moved to Alianza Lima, where he played regularly until 1987, when he joined Honduran side Atlético Marte.

Valencia returned to Alianza Lima in 1988, but moved to Bolivian side Blooming in the following year. In 1990, he rejoined Alianza Lima for a third spell, before ending his professional career at the age of 33 in 1994. In 2001, he returned to action with lowly Aurora Chancayllo, but retired in the same year.

In an international figure, Valencia played 14 times for the Peru national team between 1984 and 1989, also being a part of the squad in the 1989 Copa América.

== Managerial career ==
Valencia started his managerial career in 2000 with Unión Huaral. After being in charge of Sporting Cristal's youth setup, he was named manager of the club in 2003 in the place of Renê Weber, and won the 2003 Apertura with the side.

In 2004, despite his team's performance in the 2004 Copa Libertadores, Valencia was sacked and replaced by Edgardo Bauza. In 2005, he took over former club Alianza Lima, but resigned.

In 2006, Valencia was in charge of Cienciano. After a four-year period away from coaching duties, he returned to a managerial role in 2010, after being appointed manager of Total Chalaco.

Valencia continued to work in the Peruvian first division in the following years, being in charge of Melgar, José Gálvez, Sport Huancayo (three spells), Alianza Lima, León de Huánuco, Real Garcilaso, Juan Aurich, Sport Boys and Atlético Grau.

== Personal life ==
Valencia's younger brother Marco was also a footballer and manager. A midfielder, he too played for Alianza and the national team.
