= Carlos Cortijo =

Peruvian footballer and manager (born 1969)

Personal information
- Full name: Carlos Alfonso Cortijo McCubbin
- Date of birth: 22 August 1969 (age 57)
- Place of birth: Lima, Peru
- Position: Forward

Team information
- Current team: León de Huánuco (head coach)

Senior career*
Years	Team	Apps	(Gls)
1986	Deportivo Municipal		
1987	Deportivo AELU		
1988–1990	Deportivo Galicia		
1991	Deportivo Lara		
1992	CNI		
1993	Octavio Espinosa		

International career
1986–1988	Peru U20		

Managerial career
- 2007: U. San Marcos
- 2010: Sport Victoria
- 2012: U. San Pedro
- 2013: Octavio Espinosa
- 2013: Deportivo San Ignacio
- 2014: Deportivo Municipal
- 2015: Comerciantes Unidos
- 2016: Atlético Torino
- 2016: Cultural Santa Rosa
- 2017: Sport Victoria
- 2018: Juan Aurich
- 2019: Cultural Santa Rosa
- 2019: Comerciantes Unidos
- 2019: Pirata FC
- 2020: León de Huánuco
- 2020: Pirata FC
- 2021: Cañar FC
- 2021: Unión Comercio
- 2022: Deportivo Coopsol
- 2022: Juan Aurich
- 2023: León de Huánuco
- 2023: Unión Comercio (assistant)
- 2023: ADA Cajabamba
- 2023: Juventud La Joya
- 2024: León de Huánuco
- 2024: Real Independiente
- 2025: CD Santa Elena
- 2025: Juan Aurich
- 2026: León de Huánuco
- 2026: Juventus Huamachuco
- 2026: CD Las Palmas
- 2026–: León de Huánuco
- * Club domestic league appearances and goals

Carlos Alfonso Cortijo McCubbin (born 22 August 1969) is a Peruvian football manager and former player.

== Playing career ==
In 1986, Carlos Cortijo made his debut with Deportivo Municipal before moving to Deportivo AELU the following year. He then played in Venezuela, notably for Deportivo Galicia. In 1991, he returned to Peru and, after stints with Octavio Espinosa (Ica) and CNI (Iquitos), he ended his playing career in 1994.

Between 1986 and 1988, he was called up to the Peruvian U20 national team.

== Managerial career ==
Having become a coach, Carlos Cortijo specializes in the Peruvian second division, having started in this category with Universidad San Marcos in 2007. He subsequently won two consecutive D2 championships, in 2014 with Deportivo Municipal, and then in 2015 with Comerciantes Unidos.

He also had the opportunity to manage other second-division teams, including Juan Aurich in 2018, with less success. In 2019, he coached Pirata FC in the first division before resigning. He returned in 2020 to manage the club again, this time in the second division.

In 2021, he moved to Ecuador to take charge of Cañar FC, a third-division Ecuadorian club. Returning to Peru, he successively managed Unión Comercio, Deportivo Coopsol, Juan Aurich and León de Huánuco between 2021 and 2023.

== Honours ==
=== Manager ===
Deportivo Municipal

- Peruvian Segunda División: 2014

Comerciantes Unidos

- Peruvian Segunda División: 2015
