= Gut (footballer) =

Brazilian footballer (born 1996)

Personal information
- Full name: Otávio Gut Oliveira
- Date of birth: 19 June 1996 (age 30)
- Place of birth: Jundiaí, Brazil
- Height: 1.93 m (6 ft 4 in)
- Position: Centre-back

Team information
- Current team: Universidad de San Martín
- Number: 4

Youth career
- Atlético Mineiro

Senior career*
Years	Team	Apps	(Gls)
2015–2017	Paulista	20	(1)
2016	→ Nacional-SP (loan)	13	(1)
2017	Francana		
2018–2020	Comercial-SP	26	(3)
2020–2022	Anápolis-GO	16	(0)
2021–2022	→ Farense (loan)	11	(0)
2022	XV de Piracicaba		
2023	Figueirense	23	(0)
2024	Sport Huancayo	19	(0)
2025–2026	Alianza Universidad	32	(2)
2026–	Universidad de San Martín	0	(0)
- * Club domestic league appearances and goals as of 14 March 2026

Otávio Gut Oliveira (born 19 June 1996), commonly known as Gut, is a Brazilian footballer who plays as a centre-back for Universidad de San Martín, in the Peruvian Segunda División.

== Club career ==
Born in Jundiaí, Gut started his career with Atlético Mineiro. After stints at Paulista, Nacional-SP and Francana in the lower divisions of the Campeonato Paulista, he signed for Comercial-SP in 2018.

After three seasons with Comercial, Gut left São Paulo and joined Anápolis-GO. However, he did not immediately settle into the team, and was loaned to Portuguese side Farense in July 2021.

On 22 November 2022, Gut signed a contract with Figueirense for the 2023 season.

== Career statistics ==
=== Club ===
As of 6 May 2022.

Club	Season	League			State League		Cup		Other		Total	
Club	Season	Division	Apps	Goals	Apps	Goals	Apps	Goals	Apps	Goals	Apps	Goals
Paulista	2015	–			5 (Note: Appearances in the Campeonato Paulista A2)	0	0	0	0	0	5	0
Paulista	2016	–			0	0	0	0	0	0	0	0
Paulista	2017	–			15 (Note: Appearances in the Campeonato Paulista A3)	1	0	0	0	0	15	1
Paulista	Total		0	0	20	1	0	0	0	0	20	1
Nacional-SP (loan)	2016	–			13	1	0	0	0	0	13	1
Comercial	2018	–			10 (Note: Appearances in the Campeonato Paulista Segunda Divisão)	1	0	0	0	0	10	1
Comercial	2019	–			4	0	0	0	20 (Note: Appearances in the Copa Paulista)	3	24	3
Comercial	2020	–			12	2	0	0	0	0	12	2
Comercial	Total		0	0	26	3	0	0	20	3	46	6
Anápolis-GO	2020	–			2 (Note: Appearances in the Campeonato Goiano)	0	0	0	0	0	2	0
Anápolis-GO	2021	–			14	0	0	0	0	0	14	0
Anápolis-GO	2022	Série D	0	0	0	0	0	0	0	0	0	0
Anápolis-GO	Total		0	0	16	0	0	0	0	0	16	0
Farense	2021–22	Liga Portugal 2	11	0	–		2 (Note: Appearances in the Taça da Liga)	0	0	0	13	0
Career total			4	0	0	0	0	0	0	0	4	0
