= Percy Liza =

Peruvian footballer (born 2000)

Personal information
- Full name: Carlos Percy Liza Espinoza
- Date of birth: 10 April 2000 (age 26)
- Place of birth: Chimbote, Peru
- Height: 1.85 m (6 ft 1 in)
- Position: Forward

Team information
- Current team: Melgar
- Number: 17

Youth career
- 2012: José Gálvez FBC
- 2013: AD José Gálvez
- 2014: Deportivo José Olaya
- 2014: Centro de Formación Chimbote
- 2015: Academia SiderPerú
- 2016-2017: Universidad San Pedro
- 2018-2019: Sporting Cristal

Senior career*
| Years | Team | Apps | (Gls) |
| 2018–2019 | Sporting Cristal B | 37 | (8) |
| 2019–2022 | Sporting Cristal | 56 | (12) |
| 2022–2023 | Marítimo | 11 | (1) |
| 2024 | Carlos A. Mannucci | 27 | (1) |
| 2025– | Melgar | 20 | (3) |

International career^{‡}
| 2023– | Peru | 2 | (0) |
- * Club domestic league appearances and goals as of 30 December 2025 ‡ National team caps and goals as of 18:27, 6 October 2023 (UTC)

Carlos Percy Liza Espinoza (Spanish pronunciation: [ˈpeɾki ˈlisa]; born 10 April 2000), also known as Mbaliza, due to his physical resemblance to Kylian Mbappe, is a Peruvian professional footballer who plays as a forward for Peruvian Primera División club Melgar.

Born and raised in the city of Chimbote, at the age of 17 he settled in Lima, where Sporting Cristal agreed to discipline him after his transfer to the capital. After a rapid progression through the reserve team, proclaiming himself Torneo de Promoción y Reserva in 2018, he made his official debut with the first team in April 2019 at the age of 18. After being prone to injuries early in his career, he established one more season in reserve reaching the two-time championship that year. The following year he established himself as a fundamental player for the club, winning his first title in the 2020 season. Another season followed, in which Liza managed to win the Torneo Apertura, Copa Bicentenario and would be proclaimed runner-up in the tournament.

== Early life ==
Carlos Percy Liza Espinoza was born in Chimbote, in the department of Ancash. Percy grew up in a Christian family and in a home with average conditions.

He began to stand out among his colleagues at the José Gálvez FBC Soccer School, his first club and where he worked. His idols were Paolo Guerrero and Karim Benzema. The following year, he joined the ranks of the José Gálvez Sports Academy, where he continued his progression. In 2014, he became part of the José Olaya Sports Club, that same year he continued his career at the Chimbote Training Center. Liza became part of the SiderPerú Academy in 2015. The following year, he continued his youth career in San Pedro University until the following season, after playing for the Ancash Region in a Regional Tournament contesting the final stages in Puente Piedra. In 2017, the scouting area of the celestial cast held a test to sign for the Sporting Cristal Club and He became part of the club in Lima, the Peruvian capital, having to move alone and get away from his family.

Once the transfer was completed, he began his new journey in the discipline of the Lima club as of the 2018 season. In the quarry directed by Pablo Zegarra, he was assigned psychologists, personalized tutors who guided him in his studies and doctors who observed his physical growth, which contributed to his training as a person and a footballer. Percy Liza would achieve the double championship with the reserve team (2018 and 2019) and would be one of the scorers of the quarries.

== Club career ==
=== Sporting Cristal ===
==== 2019-2021: Debut and early years ====
He made his first-team debut on January 30, 2019, in a friendly match against Emelec, at that time coached by Ismael Rescalvo, at the George Capwell Stadium. On February 3, he was summoned to play another friendly, this time against Academia Cantolao for the Día de la Raza Celeste.

At the beginning of April Liza signed his first professional contract with the club for 2 years. Claudio Vivas made him debut in an official match against Ayacucho FC, at the Ciudad de Cumaná Stadium on April 6, 2019. At the age of eighteen, ten months and twenty-six days, being one of the homegrown players to make his debut in the First Division. On May 22, he made his debut in the Copa Sudamericana against the Unión Española; However, for the rematch he was separated due to indiscipline. He scored his first official goal against Club Universitario de Deportes, on the seventh day of the League championship on November 20, 2020. On December 12, Sporting Cristal played the rematch for the Liga 1 Play-offs against Ayacucho FC where Liza scored the last goal ensuring the team's pass to the final. This was, after playing the final against Universitario, the first title of the season that he won with the sky-blue team.

In early 2021, Liza renewed his contract with the celestial club for two seasons. However, he had a discreet participation in Fase 1. On May 6 he made his debut in the Copa Libertadores against Rentistas, a match in which he suffered a knee injury. After a poor turnout until the middle of the year, Liza would play one of his best games at the start of Fase 2, scoring a header and fostering a penalty for his team in the 4–2 win over Cantolao. On July 28, Liza won his second Peruvian football title, the Copa Bicentenario, after scoring two goals in Cristal's 2–1 victory over Carlos A. Mannucci, with this victory he would qualify for the 2022 Supercopa Peruana. On August 23, he scored a goal over Cusco FC 4–1. The next goal was scored on August 27, in a 1–0 victory over FBC Melgar. Days later, on September would score a goal in the 6–1 victory over the Universidad Técnica de Cajamarca. In the next match would score a goal in the 1–3 defeat against Mannucci. Liza would reappear with a masterful participation, scoring and assisting in the victory against Binacional 4–3. Percy Liza would play the final against Club Alianza Lima where he obtained the runner-up with Cristal after losing with a 1-0 aggregate result. After a good season, he received the Revelation Player award and was praised by Paolo Guerrero. Liza, after finishing the season, was the interest of several clubs and after being on vacation in Europe, he went directly to Belgium to witness an Anderlecht match in Brussels against the Zulte Waregem team where he was next to his representative so various media from that country argued that it could be a bet on the Belgian club; his compatriot, Andrés Mendoza, stated that the player should be able to leave his club, adapt and stay in Europe, in addition to mentioning that his style of play makes him easily adapt to Belgian football.

==== Continued development and success in Peru (2022-present) ====
After speculation with the Belgian club, Liza would continue in the Lima club, due to which he joined the preseason in Florida. Liza would be called to play a friendly against the Reserve Team, then led by Jorge Cazulo, a match where he would be a participant scoring a goal in a 7–0 victory. His next goal in the preseason was scored in a 2–1 victory over Deportivo Municipal at the Alberto Gallardo Stadium. Days later, on January 22, he would score a goal in the victory over Academia Cantolao by 1–0.

After poor results during the first league dates, Liza would be a participant in the 3–2 victory against the Universidad Técnica de Cajamarca, scoring and assisting for the fourth date of Liga 1. Percy Liza would play his first classic of the year in a 1–0 victory against Club Alianza Lima. In the next match would score a goal in the 2–2 draw against Academia Cantolao.

== Player profile ==
=== Style of play ===
Liza has been described by Roberto Mosquera as a "great soccer talent". His performances with Sporting Cristal in 2021 have led to him being compared to Kylian Mbappé in the media. A versatile forward, Liza often plays as a winger and is able to play on either flank due to his ability with both feet. He is able to cut into the middle with his strongest right foot from the left wing, and is also able to create opportunities and provide assists to his teammates from the right due to his vision and in the middle as the main forward, due to his composure, clinical finish and eye for goal. Liza is also known for his dribbling ability, as well as his explosive acceleration, agility, quick feet, and creativity when in possession of the ball, as demonstrated through the use of elaborate feints, jumping steps. or sudden changes of pace or direction to beat opponents in one-on-one situations. Despite his tall and robust figure, he is also an athletic player, endowed with physical strength.

Although being naturally right-handed, Liza can strike with both feet from the inside area. Primarily deployed as a center forward, Liza has also played in various other offensive positions, including on the wing, as an attacking midfielder, and as a playmaker behind the main forward. In addition to his goalscoring, he is known for his willingness and ability to fall into deeper or wider positions, his ability to link play with midfielders and his strength and technical ability in holding up the ball and providing assists. He has been described as "agile and fast" in the media.

Liza is also recognised for his close ball control, dribbling and movement off the ball. His playing style includes making attacking runs into space and moving past opposing defenders.

== Career statistics ==
=== Club ===
As of match played 28 August 2022

Appearances and goals by club, season and competition
| Club | Season | League | | | National Cup | | Continental | | Total | |
| Club | Season | Division | Apps | Goals | Apps | Goals | Apps | Goals | Apps | Goals |
|---|---|---|---|---|---|---|---|---|---|---|
| Sporting Cristal | 2019 | Liga 1 | 2 | 0 | - | | 1 | 0 | 3 | 0 |
| Sporting Cristal | 2020 | Liga 1 | 8 | 2 | - | | - | | 8 | 2 |
| Sporting Cristal | 2021 | Liga 1 | 23 | 6 | 3 | 2 | 5 | 0 | 31 | 8 |
| Sporting Cristal | 2022 | Liga 1 | 19 | 4 | - | | 5 | 1 | 24 | 5 |
| Sporting Cristal | Total | | 52 | 12 | 3 | 2 | 11 | 1 | 66 | 15 |
| Career total | | | 52 | 12 | 3 | 2 | 11 | 1 | 66 | 15 |

== Honours ==
=== Club ===
Sporting Cristal

- Liga 1: 2020
- Copa Bicentenario: 2021
- Torneo Apertura: 2021
