= Federico Urciuoli =

Argentine football manager

Personal information
- Date of birth: 24 April 1984 (age 42)
- Place of birth: Buenos Aires, Argentina

Team information
- Current team: Alianza Atlético (manager)

Managerial career
- Years: Team
- 2019–2020: Almagro (reserves)
- 2019: Almagro (interim)
- 2021: Defensores de Belgrano (assistant)
- 2022: Atlético Grau (assistant)
- 2022–2023: Delfín (assistant)
- 2023–2025: Camioneros
- 2026–: Alianza Atlético

Federico Urciuoli (born 24 April 1984) is an Argentine football manager, currently in charge of Peruvian club Alianza Atlético.

== Career ==
Born in Buenos Aires, Urciuoli began working in the technical staff of Talleres de Remedios de Escalada in 2016. He joined Almagro in 2018 as a general coordinator, and took over their reserve team in February 2019 before being named interim manager of the main squad late in that month.

Back to his previous role after a 1–1 home draw against Agropecuario, Urciuoli later worked at El Porvenir before becoming the assistant of Felipe de la Riva at Defensores de Belgrano. He would later worked under the same capacity at Peruvian side Atlético Grau and Ecuadorian club Delfín, behind compatriots Gustavo Álvarez and Guillermo Duró, respectively.

On 8 March 2023, Urciuoli was appointed manager of Camioneros in the Torneo Promocional Amateur. He led the club to a first-ever promotion to the Primera C in the following year as champions, and also won the tournament in the 2025 season, achieving another promotion, to the Primera B. On 3 December 2025, however, he departed the club.

Urciuoli returned to Peru on 8 December 2025, now as manager of Alianza Atlético in the Liga 1.

== Honours ==
Camioneros

- Torneo Promocional Amateur: 2024
- Primera C Metropolitana: 2025
