= Brayan Guevara =

Peruvian footballer (born 1998)

Personal information
- Full name: Brayan Alfredo Guevara Uchofen
- Date of birth: 5 May 1998 (age 28)
- Place of birth: Chiclayo, Peru
- Height: 1.71 m (5 ft 7 in)
- Position: Left winger

Team information
- Current team: Alianza Universidad
- Number: 14

Senior career*
Years	Team	Apps	(Gls)
2016–2017	Comerciantes Unidos	31	(2)
2018–2019	UTC Cajamarca	40	(1)
2020	Carlos Stein	6	(0)
2021	Unión Huaral	18	(2)
2022–	Alianza Universidad	89	(3)
- * Club domestic league appearances and goals as of 30 December 2025

Brayan Alfredo Guevara Uchofen (born 5 May 1998) is a Peruvian footballer who plays as a left winger for Alianza Universidad.

== Career ==
=== Club career ===
Guevara made his professional debut for Comerciantes Unidos at the age of 18 on 20 October 2016. He started on the bench, before replacing Marvin Rios in the 70th minute. Only 8 minutes later, he scored his first goal for the club. He played 31 league games for the club between 2016 and 2017, before he joined UTC Cajamarca.

On 31 December 2019, FC Carlos Stein confirmed the signing of Guevara. He left the club at the end of 2020.

On 16 February 2021, Guevara joined Peruvian Segunda División club Unión Huaral. A year later, on 6 January 2022, Guevara moved to Alianza Universidad.
