= León de Huánuco =

- Full name: Club Social Deportivo León de Huánuco
- Nicknames: Las Fieras; Los Cremas del Centro; El Ídolo de la Ciudad
- Founded: 29 June 1946; 80 years ago
- Ground: Estadio Heraclio Tapia
- Capacity: 25,000
- Chairman: Edison Díaz Esquivel
- Manager: Carlos Cortijo
- League: Copa Perú
- 2018: National Stage
- Website: http://leondehuanuco.net/
Home colours	Away colours

Club Social Deportivo León de Huánuco, more commonly known as León de Huánuco, is a professional Peruvian football club based in the city of Huánuco. It is historically the biggest football club of Huánuco city. Founded in 1946, the club plays in the Copa Peru which is the fourth tier of Peruvian football.

== History ==
León de Huánuco was founded on 29 June, 1946.

The club occupies the position 14 in the accumulated table of championships of the First Division.

In the 1972 Copa Perú, León de Huánuco was runner-up and qualified to the 1973 Torneo Descentralizado.

In the 1980 Copa Perú, León de Huánuco qualified to the 1981 Torneo Descentralizado, when defeated Comercial Aguas Verdes.

In the 2000 Copa Perú, León de Huánuco qualified to the National Stage, but was eliminated by Coronel Bolognesi in the semifinals.

In the 2001 Copa Perú, León de Huánuco qualified to the National Stage, but was eliminated by Deportivo Bolito in the semifinals.

In the 2002 Copa Perú, León de Huánuco qualified to the National Stage, but was eliminated by Atlético Universidad in the semifinals.

In the 2006 Copa Perú, León de Huánuco qualified to the National Stage, but was eliminated by Sport Huamanga in the round of 16.

On December 12, 2010, at the Estadio Monumental, Leon de Huanuco was defeated by Universidad San Martín de Porres in Peru's two-legged final that gave USMP the domestic championship.

== Kit and badge ==
1946–08; Home	2010; Home	2011; Home	2012–Present; Home

1946–08; Away	2009–10; Away	2011; Away	2012–Present; Away

1946–2009

== Stadium ==
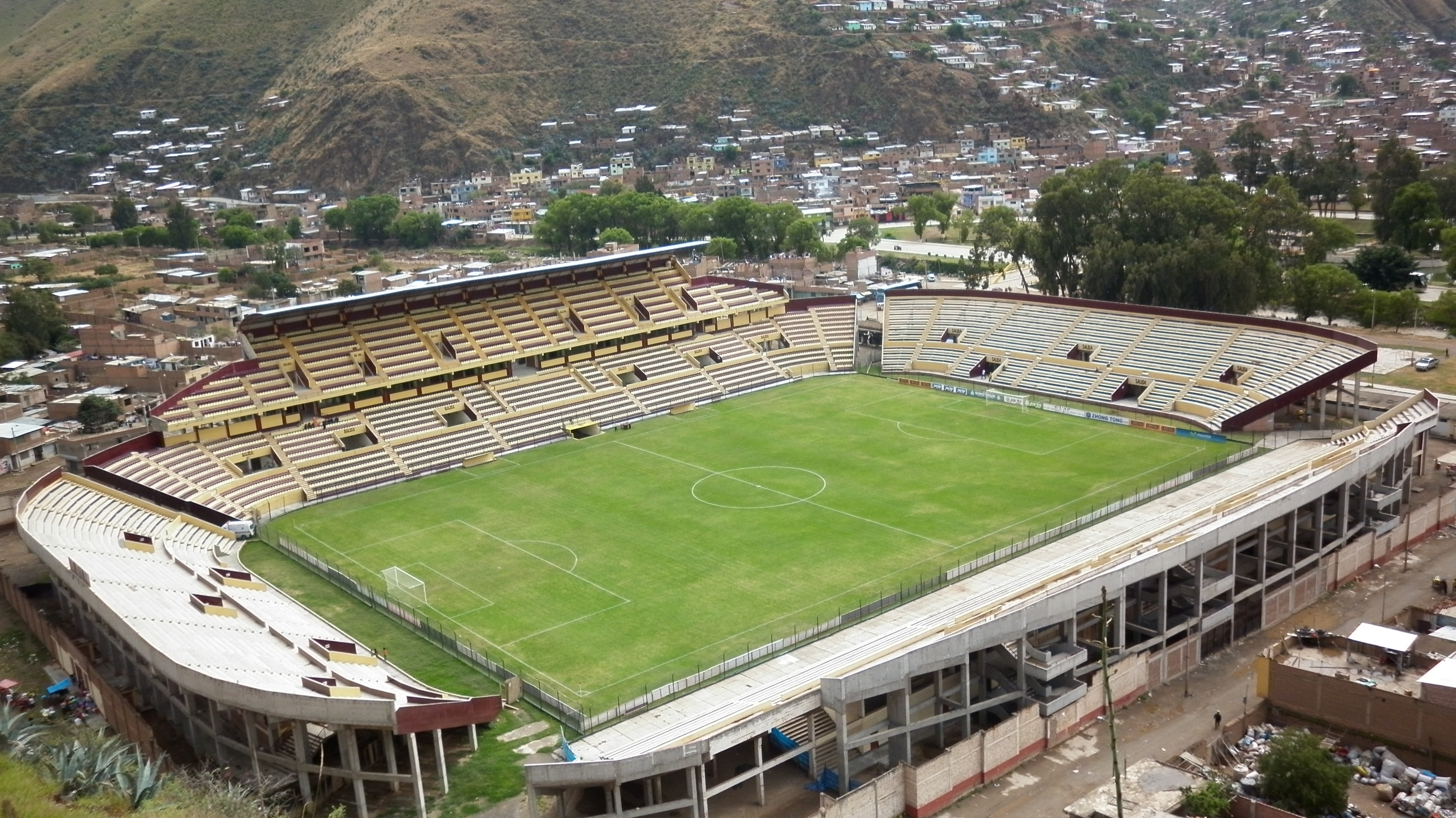
Estadio Heraclio Tapia

León de Huánuco's home stadium is the Estadio Heraclio Tapia. The club shares the stadium with city rivals Alianza Universidad, who participate in the Peruvian Primera División. The stadium has a seating capacity of 25,000. When León de Huánuco was the dominant team, the stadium featured the colors of the club. However, after the rise of Alianza Universidad, the stadium has since been changed to feature the colors of that club, which are blue and red.

== Rivalries ==
León de Huánuco has had a long-standing rivalry with Alianza Universidad. However, the rivalry is not played much, as the teams are in separate leagues.

== Honours ==
=== Senior titles ===
Keys

- Record
- ^{(s)} Shared record

Type	Competition	Titles	Runner-up	Winning years	Runner-up years
National (League)	Primera División	—	1	—	2010
National (League)	Intermedia (1984–1987)	2	1	1984 Zona Centro, 1985 Zona Centro	1987 Zona Centro
National (League)	Copa Perú	2	1	1980, 2009	1972
Half-year / Short tournament (League)	Torneo Zona Centro	1	2	1991–II	1991–I
Regional (League)	Región Norte B	1	2	1972	1968, 1969
Regional (League)	Región IV	1	—	1996	—
Regional (League)	Región V	3	1	2000, 2001, 2002	2009
Regional (League)	Región VI	1	—	2006	—
Regional (League)	Liga Departamental de Huánuco	12	6	1966, 1967, 1968, 1969, 1970, 1971, 2000, 2001, 2002, 2003, 2006, 2007	2004, 2008, 2009, 2017, 2018, 2025
Regional (League)	Liga Superior de Huánuco	—	2	—	2008, 2009
Regional (League)	Liga Provincial del Huánuco	3	1	2002, 2003, 2025	2018
Regional (League)	Liga Distrital del Huánuco	6	4	1954, 1957, 1965, 1966, 1967, 1968	2018, 2019, 2022, 2025

== Performance in CONMEBOL competitions ==
A = appearances, P = matches played, W = won, D = drawn, L = lost, GF = goals for, GA = goals against.

Season	Competition	Round		Club	Home	Away
2011	Copa Libertadores	Group Stage	(Bolivia)	Oriente Petrolero	1–0	0–2
2011	Copa Libertadores	Group Stage	(Brazil)	Grêmio	1–1	0–2
2011	Copa Libertadores	Group Stage	(Colombia)	Junior	1–2	1–1
2012	Copa Sudamericana	Q1	(Ecuador)	Deportivo Quito	0–1	2–3

== Managers ==
- (Peru) Javier Chávez (1971-1972)
- (Paraguay) César Cubilla (1972)
- (Peru) Javier Chávez (1973-1974)
- (Paraguay) César Cubilla (1975)
- (Argentina) Vito Andrés Bártoli (1975)
- (Peru) Raúl Gorriti (1975-1976)
- (Peru) Mario Gonzales (1976)
- (Peru) Carlos Chávez (1977)
- (Peru) José Lugo (1978)
- (Peru) Julio Meléndez (1978-1979)
- (Argentina) José Pérez Figueiras (1979)
- (Peru) Julio Gómez (1980) Campeón Copa Perú
- (Peru) Fernando Cuéllar Ávalos (1981)
- (Peru) José Fernández (1981)
- (Peru) Fernando Cuéllar Ávalos (1983-1984)
- (Peru) César Ponce (1984-1986)
- (Peru) José Nicamor Chacaltana Ramos (1990)
- (Peru) Diego Agurto (1991-1992)
- (Peru) Roberto Chale (1992)
- (Paraguay) César Cubilla (1993)
- (Argentina) (Peru) Ramón Quiroga (1994)
- (Peru) Rufino Bernales (2006)
- (Peru) Mifflin Bermúdez (2009)
- (Peru) Oswaldo Araujo (2009). Campeón Copa Perú 2009
- (Peru) Franco Navarro (2010–2011)
- (Uruguay) Aníbal Ruiz (2012)
- (Peru) Jean Ferrari (2012)
- (Peru) Teddy Cardama (2012)
- (Colombia) Édgar Ospina (2013)
- (Peru) José Soto (2013)
- (Peru) César Chacón (2013)
- (Peru) Wilmar Valencia (2014)
- (Peru) César Chacón (2014)
- (Paraguay) Rolando Chilavert (2014–2015)
- (Peru) Fredy García (2015)
- (Peru) Carlos Cumapa (interim) (2015)
- (Argentina) Carlos Ramacciotti (2015)
- (Peru) Juan Chumpitaz Rivera (2017)
- (Peru) Teddy Cardama (2018)
- (Peru) Mifflin Bermúdez (2018)
- (Peru) Roberto Tristán (2018)
- (Peru) Carlos Cortijo (2020)
- (Peru) Roberto Tristán (2021)
- (Peru) Pedro Sandoval (2023)
- (Peru) Víctor Peña (interim) (2023)
- (Peru) Carlos Cortijo (2023–)

== See also ==
- List of football clubs in Peru
- Peruvian football league system
