= Alejandro Ramos =

Peruvian footballer (born 1998)

Personal information
- Full name: Elías Alejandro Ramos Castillo
- Date of birth: 13 September 1998 (age 28)
- Place of birth: Pisco, Peru
- Height: 1.70 m (5 ft 7 in)
- Position: Right-back

Team information
- Current team: Melgar
- Number: 4

Youth career
- Esther Grande
- Sport Boys

Senior career*
Years	Team	Apps	(Gls)
2017–2018	Sport Boys	47	(4)
2019–2020	Alianza Universidad	52	(1)
2021–	Melgar	120	(3)
- * Club domestic league appearances and goals as of 30 December 2025

Elías Alejandro Ramos Castillo (born 19 September 1998) is a Peruvian footballer who plays as a right-back for Peruvian Primera División side FBC Melgar.

Ramos is nicknamed El Zorro which means The Fox.

== Career ==
=== Club career ===
Ramos is a product of Esther Grande and Sport Boys. He got his professional debut for Sport Boys on 23 April 2017 against Unión Huaral in the Peruvian Primera División. Since his debut, he became a regular starter and made 23 league appearances throw the year. After a good season, he signed a contract extension for one year in December 2017. In his second season, Ramos made a total of 24 appearances for Sport Boys.

In January 2019, Ramos joined fellow league club Alianza Universidad. He made 30 league appearances in his first season. After 52 appearances, Ramos left the club at the end of 2020 to join FBC Melgar for the 2021 season. The deal was confirmed on 10 December 2020.

== Honours ==
FBC Melgar

- Torneo Apertura 2022
