= Torneo Intermedio =

- Founded: 1993
- Region: Peru
- Teams: 16 (1993)
- Current champions: Deportivo Municipal
- Most championships: Deportivo Municipal (1 title)

The Torneo Intermedio was a knockout competition played by 16 football teams. Deportivo Municipal were crowned champions of the tournament's only edition after defeating Deportivo Sipesa in the final, thereby qualifying for the 1994 Copa CONMEBOL. However, they later withdrew from the international competition due to financial problems.

== History ==
=== 1993 ===
The Torneo Intermedio was played during the 1993 Copa América with only Peruvian Primera División teams. The 16 clubs were divided into 4 groups and the top two teams advanced to the quarterfinals. Although Deportivo Municipal won the tournament, they declined to play in the 1994 Copa CONMEBOL and the end-of-season Liguilla runner-up received this berth.

== Champions ==
- (In bracket, title count):

Ed.	Year	Champion	Scores	Runner-up	Venue	Winning manager
1	1993	Deportivo Municipal (1)	2–2 (4–3 p)	Deportivo Sipesa	Alejandro Villanueva, Lima	(Peru) Rufino Bernales

== Titles by club ==
Club	Winners	Runners-up	Winning years	Runners-up years
Deportivo Municipal	1	0	1993	—
Deportivo Sipesa	0	1	—	1993
