= Asociación Deportiva Tarma =

Peruvian professional football club

ADT
- Full name: Asociación Deportiva Tarma
- Nicknames: El vendaval celeste Los tarmeños
- Founded: 18 June 1929; 97 years ago
- Ground: Estadio Unión Tarma
- Capacity: 9,100
- Chairman: Claudio Vidal Limaylla
- Manager: Pablo Trobbiani
- League: Liga 1
- 2025: Liga 1, 10th of 19
Home colours	Away colours	Third colours

Asociación Deportiva Tarma, commonly referred as ADT, or ADT Tarma, is a Peruvian professional football club based in the city of Tarma, Junín. The club was founded in 1929 as Alianza Tarma, changing their name to ADT in 1960. ADT currently compete in the Peruvian Primera División, the top tier of Peruvian football.

== History ==
=== Founding ===
Asociación Deportiva Tarma was founded on 18 June 1929 as Alianza Tarma. They changed their name Asociación Deportiva Tarma, or ADT, in 1960. ADT would play Liga Departamental de Junín until 1970, where they won the league and got promoted to that years Copa Perú.

=== Professional era ===
Three consecutive finals would be the example that ADT wanted to enter professional football at the end of the seventies. In 1979, it qualified for the Copa Perú the third consecutive time for the final along with Aguas Verdes de Zarumilla, Centenario de Ayacucho, Defensor Lima, Deportivo Garcilaso and Universidad Técnica de Cajamarca.

After finishing fourth in 1977 and 1978, it won the Copa Perú for the first time. This is a summary of the journey that the Celestes made until writing their most glorious page. As a result of winning the Copa Perú, ADT were promoted to the Primera División for the first time.

The following year, in its first season in the top flight, it achieved its best campaign in the first division, as it entered the final playoffs and finished as the third best team of the year, coming very close to qualifying for the Copa Libertadores by finishing two points behind Atlético Torino, which was classified as runner-up for that cup. In the following seasons its performances did not go beyond regular until 1990, the year in which it won the Central Region, qualifying for the pre-league where it would be eliminated by Alianza Lima. It remained in the first division until the 1991 season, when, upon eliminating the regional tournaments, the number of teams was reduced and the club could not enter the next season. It participated in the 1992 Zonal Tournament, but did not qualify for the final playoffs and was relegated to the Copa Perú.

=== Relegation to the Copa Perú ===
The club managed to reach the National Stage of the 2010 Copa Perú, after defeating historic teams like Alianza Universidad and Unión Minas in their group; later they were eliminated by Alianza Unicachi of Puno in the semi-finals.

In 2011, they reached the National Stage of the Copa Peru again, but were eliminated by Alianza Universidad in the quarter-finals.

In the 2012 Copa Perú, they were eliminated in the regional stage after finishing last in their group. The following year, they only made it to the provincial stage, while in 2014 and the 2015 Copa Perú they were eliminated in the departmental stage.

In the 2017 Copa Perú, they reached the national stage after winning the Tarma district league, the Tarma provincial league and the Junín departmental league. Already in the national stage, they managed to finish 11th out of 50. This result allowed them to move on to the play-off stage against Unión San Martín de Pisco and they were eliminated with an overall score of 2 to 1. In the 2018 season, they were eliminated in the departmental stage.

=== Return to the first division ===
After many years of irregular campaigns, they participated from the second phase of the 2021 Copa Perú where they faced Unión Juventud. After drawing 0-0 in regular time, they were eliminated in a penalty shoot-out but managed to qualify due to an improper line-up of an opposing player. In phase 3, they beat Colegio Comercio 2-1 to qualify for the final playoff where after 7 dates they achieved first place and made it to the final. On November 29, they faced Alfonso Ugarte in the final against whom they drew 0-0 and in a penalty shoot-out they won 5-3, winning the title and promotion to 2022 Liga 1 after 31 years. ADT ended the 2022 season in thirteenth place.

After the 2023 season, ADT qualified for the 2024 Copa Sudamericana for the first time. This was ADT's first time on the international stage. As a result, the club decided to renovate their stadium, Unión Tarma with a cost of 30 million soles and would be completed in 2025. They also proposed numerous plans for the younger divisions and develop of the club. ADT was eliminated by Deportivo Garcilaso in the Copa Sudamericana qualifying stage.

== Kit and crest ==
ADT's home kit is a light blue and white shirt and shorts. This kit was first presented in 1959 for the Commemoration of the Centenary of the San Ramón Emblematic School. The clubs away kit is white with a light blue vertical sash.

ADT's badge is a light blue crest with a white sash and a red-white tricolor patch above resembling the Peruvian flag. The badge also has two stars which represent ADT's two Copa Perú titles. The club has a very similar badge to Sporting Cristal and Atlético Torino.

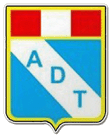
1929–2020

2021–present

== Stadium ==
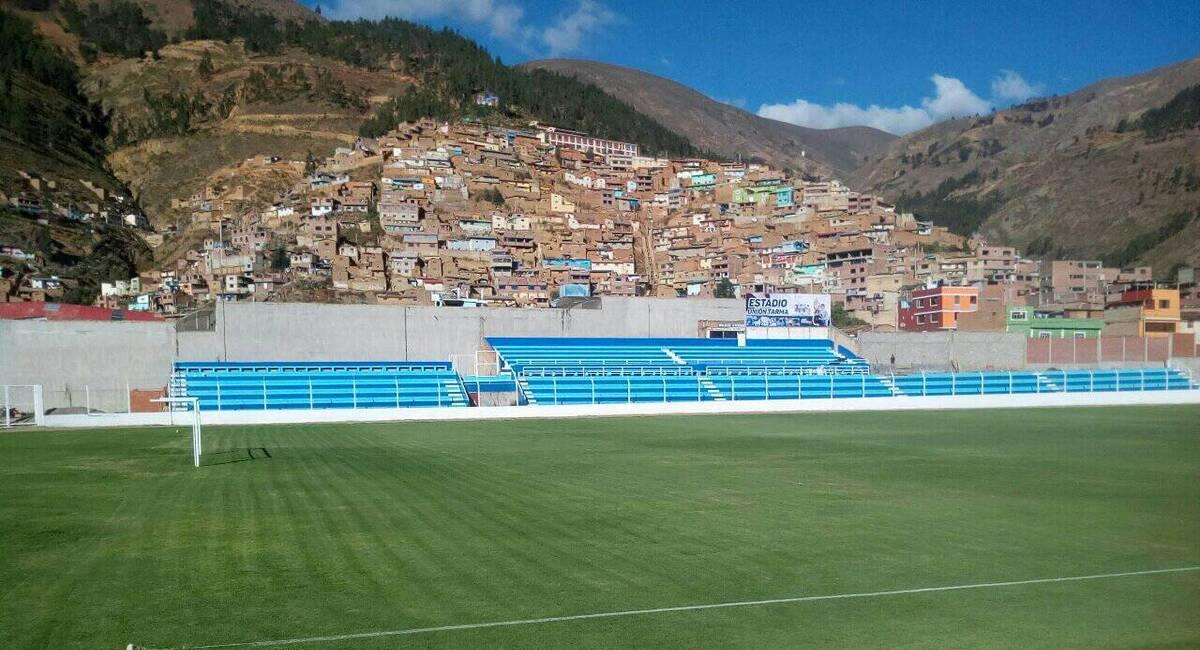
Estadio Unión Tarma

ADT's home stadium is Estadio Unión Tarma located in Tarma. The stadium was constructed in the 1980s and remodeled in 2022 after ADT's promotion to the Liga 1. It will receive another renovation in 2024 as a result of the clubs qualification for the Copa Sudamericana. The renovation will cost of 30 million soles and would be completed in 2025. The roof of the south stand was completed in mid 2024. The stadium has a capacity of 9,100. ADT shares the stadium with their rivals Sport Dos de Mayo, who participate in the Copa Perú, the fourth tier of Peruvian football.

== Rivalries ==
Asociación Deportiva Tarma has had a long-standing rivalry with Sport Dos de Mayo, another club in Tarma. This rivalry is known as the Clásico Tarmeño. The two play in regional tournaments, since Sports Dos de Mayo is not in the same league as ADT.

== Current squad ==
As of 24 September 2026

Note: Flags indicate national team as defined under FIFA eligibility rules; some limited exceptions apply. Players may hold more than one non-FIFA nationality.

No.	Pos.	Nation	Player
2	MF	PER	Jair Reyes
3	DF	PER	Leonardo Rugel
6	MF	PER	Ángel Ojeda
7	MF	ECU	Joao Rojas (captain)
9	FW	PER	Hernán Rengifo
10	MF	PER	Víctor Cedrón
15	MF	PER	Josue Alvino
16	MF	COL	Luis Pérez
18	FW	PER	Aylton Mazzo
19	MF	PER	Aarón Carnero
22	FW	PER	Aldair Rodríguez
23	DF	ECU	John Narváez
24	FW	PER	Said Peralta
25	MF	PER	Sinclair García

No.	Pos.	Nation	Player
26	FW	PER	Jhojan Garcilazo
27	MF	PER	Alexander Hidalgo
28	DF	PER	Jhair Soto
29	MF	PER	Emerson García
30	GK	COL	Juan Valencia
31	DF	PER	Jerry Navarro
32	FW	ARG	Jonatan Bauman
33	GK	PER	Carlos Solís
44	DF	PER	Horacio Benincasa
56	DF	PER	Orlando Núñez
77	FW	COL	Juan Lucumí
80	FW	PER	Jeremy Canela
98	DF	PER	Alejandro Ramos
99	DF	URU	Joaquín Pereyra

== Honours ==
=== Senior titles ===
Keys

- Record
- ^{(s)} Shared record

Type	Competition	Titles	Runner-up	Winning years	Runner-up years
National (League)	Intermedia (1984–1987)	1	—	1987 Zona Centro	—
National (League)	Copa Perú	2	—	1979, 2021	—
Half-year / Short tournament (League)	Torneo Zona Centro	3	1	1984, 1985, 1990–II	1986
Regional (League)	Región V	4	1	1977, 1978, 1979, 2010	2011
Regional (League)	Región VII	1	—	1993	—
Regional (League)	Liga Departamental del Junín	5	7	1970, 1975, 1979, 2017, 2019	1971, 1972, 1973, 1976, 2006, 2009, 2010
Regional (League)	Liga Provincial de Tarma	11	6	1969, 1970, 1971, 1972, 1973, 1975, 2007, 2014, 2015, 2017, 2019	1956, 1968, 2009, 2010, 2016, 2018
Regional (League)	Liga Distrital de Tarma	8	1	2009, 2013, 2014, 2015, 2016, 2017, 2018, 2019	2010

== Performance in CONMEBOL competitions ==
- Copa Sudamericana: 2 appearances

2024: First stage
2025: First stage

== Managers ==
- (Peru) Walter Milera (1977-1978)
- (Peru) José Nicamor Chacaltana Ramos (1979)
- (Argentina) Vito Andrés Bártoli (1980-1982)
- (Peru) Carlos Carbonell (interim) (1982)
- (Peru) Diego Agurto (1983-1984)
- (Peru) Miguel Company (1985)
- (Peru) Medardo Arce (1986)
- (Peru) Carlos Carbonell (1989-1991)
- (Peru) Rolando Echegaray (2006)
- (Peru) José Nicamor Chacaltana Ramos (2007-2008)
- (Peru) Ángel Barrios (2009)
- (Peru) Rolando Echegaray (2009)
- (Peru) Mifflin Bermúdez (2009-2010)
- (Peru) Carlos Dolorier (2011)
- (Peru) José Carlos Suárez Becerra (2011)
- (Peru) José Antonio Chacaltana Cuyubamba (2011)
- (Peru) Jaime Carrión (2012-2013)
- (Peru) Rubén Toribio Díaz (2014)
- (Peru) Miguel Morales (2015)
- (Peru) Marlon Maza (2016)
- (Peru) Elvis Farfán (2017)
- (Peru) Roberto Tristán (2018)
- (Peru) José Ramírez Cubas (2019)
- (Peru) Pedro Uribe Layseca (2019)
- (Peru) Roberto Tristán (2020)
- (Peru) Elmer Ángel Castro Cabrera (2021)
- (Peru) Juan Carlos Bazalar (2021-2022)
- (Peru) Carlos Gutiérrez (interim) (2022)
- (Peru) Franco Navarro (2022-2023)
- (Argentina) Carlos Desio (2024)
- (Peru) Wilmar Valencia (2024)
- (Argentina) Claudio Biaggio (2024)
- (Argentina) Horacio Melgarejo (2025)
