= Rufino Bernales =

Peruvian footballer and manager (born 1954)

Personal information
- Full name: Rufino Abdón Bernales Francia
- Date of birth: 30 July 1954 (age 72)
- Place of birth: Lima, Peru
- Position: Defender

Youth career
- 1969–1970: Deportivo Municipal

Senior career*
Years	Team	Apps	(Gls)
1970–1972	Deportivo Municipal		
1971	→ Octavio Espinosa (loan)		
1973	CNI		
1975–1980	CNI		
1981–1982	Juan Aurich		
1983–1984	Deportivo Municipal		
1985	CNI		
1986	Hungaritos Agustinos		

Managerial career
- 1987: Deportivo Municipal (interim)
- 1988–1989: Cienciano
- 1990: FBC Melgar
- 1992: Unión Huaral
- 1993–1994: Deportivo Municipal
- 1994: Cienciano
- 1995: Atlético Torino
- 1995: Aurich-Cañaña
- 1996: Deportivo Municipal
- 1997: Alianza Atlético
- 1997: José Gálvez FBC
- 1998: Deportivo Municipal
- 2003: Juan Aurich
- 2004: José Gálvez FBC
- 2005: CNI
- 2006: León de Huánuco
- 2007: Total Clean (assistant)
- 2008: Carlos A. Mannucci
- 2009: Deportivo Municipal
- 2010: Carlos A. Mannucci
- 2011: Defensor Politécnico
- 2012: Volante de Bambamarca
- 2012: Universidad San Pedro
- 2014: Walter Ormeño
- 2018–2019: Estudiantil CNI
- 2022: CD Agua San Martín
- * Club domestic league appearances and goals

Rufino Abdón Bernales Francia (born 30 July 1954) is a Peruvian football manager and former player.

== Playing career ==
Playing as a defender during the 1970s and early 1980s, Bernales notably played for Deportivo Municipal, CNI of Iquitos and Juan Aurich.

== Managerial career ==
Bernales became a coach in the late 1980s, influenced by Roberto Scarone who managed both Juan Aurich and Deportivo Municipal. He had his first experience on the bench as an interim manager in 1987 at Deportivo Municipal. He won his first title with Unión Huaral in 1992 when he won the 2nd division championship. The following year, he won the 1993 Torneo Intermedio with Deportivo Municipal. He managed in the Peruvian first division until 1998 when he took charge of Deportivo Municipal for 4 matchdays (replaced by Ramón Quiroga).

Bernales specialized in managing second division and Copa Perú clubs. For example, he managed Juan Aurich in 2003 and again Municipal in 2009, but could not prevent the latter's relegation from the second division to the Copa Perú.

== Honours ==
=== Manager ===
Unión Huaral

- Peruvian Segunda División: 1992

Deportivo Municipal

- Torneo Intermedio: 1993
