= Guillermo Larios =

Chilean-Peruvian footballer

Personal information
- Full name: Guillermo Alessandro Larios Saavedra
- Date of birth: 11 May 2002 (age 24)
- Place of birth: Santiago, Chile
- Height: 1.78 m (5 ft 10 in)
- Position: Forward

Team information
- Current team: Alianza Atlético
- Number: 11

Youth career
- José Olaya
- Universitario

Senior career*
Years	Team	Apps	(Gls)
2021–2022	Universitario	26	(1)
2023–	Alianza Atlético	82	(8)
- * Club domestic league appearances and goals as of 30 December 2025

Guillermo Alessandro Larios Saavedra (born 1 May 2002) is a Chilean-Peruvian professional footballer who plays as a forward for Alianza Atlético.

== Career ==
Born in Santiago, Chile, Larios is a product of the Universitario youth system. He made his professional debut in a Peruvian Primera División match against Academia Cantolao on 19 March 2021 and scored his first goal in October 2022 against UTC.

In December 2022, he joined Alianza Atlético for the 2023 season.

== Personal life ==
Larios was born in Santiago, Chile, where his parents, both Peruvians, lived and worked since 1997. He holds dual Chilean-Peruvian nationality and lived in Chile for three years.

His friends call him "Alessandro" to distinguish him from his father of the same name.

He also did track and field, taking part and winning some championships in both Chimbote and La Libertad.

== Career statistics ==
As of match played 7 March 2024

Appearances and goals by club, season and competition
Club	Season	League			Cup		Continental		Total	
Club	Season	Division	Apps	Goals	Apps	Goals	Apps	Goals	Apps	Goals
Universitario	2021	Liga 1	14	0	1	0	2	0	17	0
Universitario	2022	Liga 1	12	1	—		0	0	12	1
Universitario	Total		26	1	1	0	2	0	29	1
Alianza Atlético	2023	Liga 1	30	4	—		—		30	4
Alianza Atlético	2024	Liga 1	5	0	—		—		5	0
Alianza Atlético	Total		35	4	0	0	0	0	35	4
Career total			61	5	1	0	2	0	64	5
