= Pedro Ynamine =

Peruvian-Japanese footballer (born 1998)

Personal information
- Full name: Pedro Andre Shigueishi Ynamine Kitano
- Date of birth: 14 October 1998 (age 28)
- Place of birth: Lima, Peru
- Height: 1.80 m (5 ft 11 in)
- Position: Goalkeeper

Team information
- Current team: Alianza Universidad
- Number: 1

Youth career
- 2014–2015: Universidad San Martín
- 2016–2017: Sport Boys

Senior career*
Years	Team	Apps	(Gls)
2016–2017	Sport Boys	1	(0)
2018–2021	Universidad San Martín	15	(0)
2022	UTC	4	(0)
2023	Universidad San Martín	30	(0)
2024–	Alianza Universidad	41	(0)

International career
2014–2015	Peru U17		
- * Club domestic league appearances and goals as of 30 December 2025

Pedro Andre Shigueishi Ynamine Kitano (Japanese: ペドロ・稲嶺, born 14 October 1998) is a Peruvian-Japanese footballer who plays as a goalkeeper for Alianza Universidad.

== Club career ==
=== Early life and youth career ===
Ynamine was born in Peru, but moved to Japan at the age of one, where he stayed for 15 years. In Japan, Ynamine only played football in the school. As soon as he returned to Lima, he joined Universidad San Martín after a trial. He then had a short stint at Sport Boys, where he also made his first team debut in the Peruvian Segunda División in May 2016.

=== Return to Universidad San Martín ===
Ynamine returned to Universidad San Martín for the 2018 after a short stint at Sport Boys. On 21 July 2018, Ynamine got his official debut for San Martín in the Peruvian Primera División against Deportivo Binacional. Ynamine was in the starting lineup in a game San Martín lost 0–2.

In January 2020, he extended his contract for one further year.

=== UTC Cajamarca ===
On 7 December 2021, Ynamine signed with UTC Cajamarca for the 2022 season. He left the club at the end of the year, as his contract expired.

=== Third return to Universidad San Martín ===
Ahead of the 2023 season, Ynamine returned to Universidad San Martín for his third spell at the club.

=== Alianza Universidad ===
On February 2, 2024, Ynamine moved to Alianza Universidad.

== International career ==
As for the result of having Japanese origin, he is qualified to represent for either Peru or Japan.

In 2014–2015, Ynamine represented the Peruvian U17 national team in the 2015 South American U-17 Championship. He was also a part of the squad, participating in the 2017 South American U-20 Championship, however as the second choice, so he didn't make any appearances.

In January 2020, Ynamine was also a part of the squad, which was called up for the 2020 CONMEBOL Pre-Olympic Tournament. Also this time, he was the second choice and made no appearances.
