= Roberto Arrelucea =

Peruvian footballer and manager (born 1960)

Personal information
- Full name: Roberto Arrelucea Ayzanoa
- Date of birth: 5 February 1960 (age 66)
- Place of birth: Lima, Peru
- Position: Defender

Team information
- Current team: Deportivo Municipal (head coach)

Senior career*
Years	Team	Apps	(Gls)
?–1979	Alfonso Ugarte (Puno)		
1980–1981	Alianza Lima		
1981–?	Deportivo Junín		
?–1985	CNI		
1986–1989	Sporting Cristal		
1990	Sport Boys		
1991	San Agustín		
1992	Unión Huaral		
1992	Ovación Sipesa		
1993	Deportivo Municipal		

International career
1980–1987	Peru Olympic		

Managerial career
- 1996–1997: Deportivo Pesquero
- 1997: Universitario (Puno)
- 1998: Juan Aurich
- 1999: Unión Minas
- 2000: Juan Aurich
- 2004–2005: Atlético Universidad
- 2005: Deportivo Municipal
- 2005–2006: Unión Huaral
- 2006–2007: Total Clean
- 2007–2008: U. César Vallejo
- 2009: Carlos A. Mannucci
- 2010: Real Garcilaso
- 2011: Alianza Atlético
- 2012: Deportivo Coopsol
- 2012: Juventud Bellavista
- 2013: Carlos A. Mannucci
- 2013: U. Señor de Sipán
- 2014–2015: Deportivo Coopsol
- 2016: Estudiantil CNI
- 2017: Alfonso Ugarte (Puno)
- 2017: José Gálvez FBC
- 2018–2019: Academia Sipesa
- 2020: Santos de Nasca
- 2022–2023: Ecosem Santos
- 2023: ADA (Jaén)
- 2024: Sociedad Tiro 28
- 2025: Juventud Bellavista
- 2026: Unión La Legua
- 2026–: Deportivo Municipal
- * Club domestic league appearances and goals

Roberto Arrelucea Ayzanoa (born on 5 February 1960) is a Peruvian football manager and former player.

== Playing career ==
Nicknamed Maharajá (the maharajah), Roberto Arrelucea played as a defender and distinguished himself at Sporting Cristal, winning the Peruvian championship with them in 1988.

Although he was never called up to the Peruvian national team, he played with the Olympic team in two editions of the CONMEBOL Pre-Olympic Tournament in 1980 and 1987.

== Managerial career ==
Having become a coach, Roberto Arrelucea had his first experience in 1996 on the bench of Deportivo Pesquero, where he had the opportunity to coach Claudio Pizarro, who was making his debut as a professional footballer. In the 2000s, he began his trophy haul by winning the Copa Perú in 2006 at the helm of Total Clean, and then became second division champion the following year with Universidad César Vallejo.

In 2011, he took charge of Alianza Atlético in the first division but was unable to save the club from relegation. This was his last experience as a coach in the elite. Between 2012 and 2015, he managed Deportivo Coopsol on two separate occasions, with whom he became second division runner-up in 2014.

Arrelucea wins his second Copa Perú as manager of ADA of Jaen in 2023. At the end of September 2026, he was appointed to lead Deportivo Municipal.

== Honours ==
=== Player ===
Sporting Cristal

- Torneo Descentralizado: 1988

Deportivo Municipal

- Torneo Intermedio: 1993

=== Manager ===
Total Clean

- Copa Perú: 2006

Universidad César Vallejo

- Peruvian Segunda División: 2007

ADA (Jaén)

- Copa Perú: 2023
