= Pablo Peirano =

Uruguayan football manager (born 1975)

- Peirano in 2026

Personal information
- Full name: Pablo Peirano Pardeiro
- Date of birth: 21 January 1975 (age 51)
- Place of birth: Montevideo, Uruguay
- Height: 1.75 m (5 ft 9 in)
- Position: Midfielder

Team information
- Current team: Atlético Bucaramanga (manager)

Youth career
- Danubio

Senior career*
Years	Team	Apps	(Gls)
1992–1998	Danubio	50	(0)
1999	Tacuarembó	26	(1)
2000–2001	Racing Club Montevideo	38	(1)
2002	Paysandú	20	(0)
2003	Centauros Villavicencio		
2004–2005	Cerro	52	(0)
2006–2009	Juventud	70	(1)
2009–2010	Boston River	22	(1)

Managerial career
- 2010–2013: Uruguay U20 (assistant)
- 2014: Nacional (assistant)
- 2015–2016: Santa Fe (assistant)
- 2016: Al-Arabi (assistant)
- 2017: Racing Club Montevideo
- 2018: Danubio
- 2019: Carlos A. Mannucci
- 2020–2021: Carlos A. Mannucci
- 2022–2023: Cusco
- 2023–2025: Santa Fe
- 2025: Nacional Montevideo
- 2026–: Atlético Bucaramanga
- * Club domestic league appearances and goals

Pablo Peirano Pardeiro (born 21 January 1975) is a Uruguayan football manager and former player who played as a midfielder. He is the current manager of Atlético Bucaramanga.

== Playing career ==
Peirano was born in Montevideo, and was a Danubio youth graduate. After making his senior debut with the club, he established a career in the country's first division (aside from a short period in Colombian side Centauros Villavicencio in 2003), representing Tacuarembó, Racing Club Montevideo, Paysandú, Cerro, Juventud and Boston River, where he retired at the age of 35.

== Managerial career ==
Immediately after retiring, Peirano started working as Juan Verzeri's assistant in the Uruguay under-20 national team. After Verzeri left the national side, Peirano worked as Gerardo Pelusso's assistant at Nacional, Independiente Santa Fe, and Al-Arabi.

On 3 May 2017, Peirano was named manager of former side Racing Club Montevideo. He resigned on 7 December, and took over another club he represented as a player, Danubio, on 20 December.

On 13 December 2018, Danubio announced Peirano's departure after his contract ended. The following 2 June, he replaced Jorge Soto at the helm of Peruvian side Carlos A. Mannucci, but still left on 28 November.

On 13 March 2020, Peirano returned to Mannucci in the place of Juan Manuel Llop. He departed the club on 6 November 2021, before taking over Cusco the following 13 April.

After achieving promotion to the top tier as champions, Peirano renewed with Cusco on 13 November 2022. He was sacked on 18 September 2023, and was named in charge of Categoría Primera A side Independiente Santa Fe on 9 October.

Peirano led Santa Fe to the semifinal stage of both league tournaments of the 2024 season, ending as runner-up in the 2024 Apertura and qualified for the 2025 Copa Libertadores with the team. He left the Colombian club on 26 February 2025 by mutual agreement, one day after being eliminated from the Copa Libertadores.

On 5 April 2025, Peirano was presented as manager of Nacional Montevideo. On 27 October, he was sacked two matches before the end of the season. On 27 May 2026, Peirano returned to Colombia after being appointed as manager of Atlético Bucaramanga.

== Honours ==
Cusco

- Peruvian Segunda División: 2022
