= Gustavo Roverano =

Uruguayan-Peruvian footballer and manager (born 1967)

Personal information
- Full name: Jorge Gustavo Roverano Soto
- Date of birth: 22 July 1967 (age 59)
- Place of birth: Montevideo, Uruguay
- Position: Goalkeeper

Team information
- Current team: Estudiantil CNI (head coach)

Senior career*
Years	Team	Apps	(Gls)
1984–1991	Cerro		
1992	Deportes Concepción	30	(0)
1993	Cerro		
1994	Bella Vista		
1995	Unión Magdalena	28	(0)
1996	Central Español	20	(0)
1997–1998	Deportivo Pesquero	30	(0)
1999–2000	Alianza Atlético	80	(0)
2001–2003	Alianza Lima	78	(0)
2004	Sporting Cristal	36	(0)
2005	U. San Martín de Porres	42	(0)
2006	José Gálvez FBC	37	(0)
2007	Total Clean	41	(0)
2008	Deportivo Garcilaso		

Managerial career
- 2009: U. San Marcos
- 2013: Deportivo Coopsol
- 2015: Alianza Lima (reserves)
- 2015: Alianza Lima
- 2016: Alianza Atlético
- 2018: C.S. Cartaginés
- 2018: Cienciano
- 2019: Alianza Atlético
- 2020: Sport Chavelines
- 2022: Peru U20
- 2023: Alfonso Ugarte (Puno)
- 2024: Comerciantes FC
- 2025–: Estudiantil CNI
- * Club domestic league appearances and goals

Jorge Gustavo Roverano Soto (born 22 July 1967 in Montevideo, Uruguay) is a Uruguayan-Peruvian footballer who played for clubs of Uruguay, Chile, Peru and Colombia.

== Playing career ==
Originally from C.A. Cerro, Gustavo Roverano moved to Chile and Colombia before arriving in Peru in the late 1990s to play for Deportivo Pesquero. But it was at Alianza Lima that he won his only two titles as a player: the Peruvian championships of 2001 and 2003.

He remained in Peru and, after a stint with Sporting Cristal in 2004, finished his career at Deportivo Garcilaso in 2008.

== Managerial career ==
Roverano stayed in Peru where he began his coaching career. During his time as a manager, the former goalkeeper coached Universidad San Marcos (2009), Deportivo Coopsol (2013), Alianza Lima (2015), Alianza Atlético (twice 2016 and 2019), C.S. Cartaginés in Costa Rica (2018), Cienciano (2018), Chavelines (2020) before being appointed manager of the under-20 national team in 2022.

== Honours ==
=== Player ===
Alianza Lima

- Torneo Descentralizado: 2001, 2003
