= Miguel Ángel Fullana =

Argentine footballer and manager

Personal information
- Full name: Miguel Ángel Fullana
- Date of birth: 9 December 1966 (age 59)
- Place of birth: Firmat, Argentina
- Position: Defender

Team information
- Current team: Juventud Unida (manager)

Youth career
- Sportivo Barracas
- Newell's Old Boys

Senior career*
Years	Team	Apps	(Gls)
1985–1993	Newell's Old Boys	108	(4)

Managerial career
- 2001–2004: Deportes La Serena (assistant)
- 2004: Deportes La Serena (interim)
- 2006–2010: Juventud Unida
- 2011–2014: Newell's Old Boys (assistant)
- 2011–2014: Newell's Old Boys II
- 2015: Chaco For Ever
- 2016: Achirense
- 2017–2018: Chaco For Ever
- 2019–2020: Juventud Unida
- 2023–2024: Newell's Old Boys (women)
- 2025–: Juventud Unida
- * Club domestic league appearances and goals

Miguel Ángel Fullana (born 9 December 1963) is an Argentine former football defender and manager. He is currently in charge of Juventud Unida de Gualeguaychú.

== Career ==
Born in Firmat, Argentina, Fullana was trained at Sportivo Barracas and developed his professional career with Newell's Old Boys from 1985 to 1993. He won the Argentine Primera División in 1987–88, 1990–91 and 1992 Clausura.

As a football coach, Fullana served as assistant coach for Deportes La Serena. He assumed as interim manager in 2004.

Back to Argentina, Fullana served as assistant coach for Newell's Old Boys and coach of the reserve team. The next years, he coached Chaco For Ever, Achirense (2016) and Juventud Unida de Gualeguaychú (2006–10, 2019–20).

From September 2023 to June 2024, Fullana coached the Newell's Old Boys women's team.

In October 2025, Fullana assumed as manager of Juventud Unida de Gualeguaychú.

== Other works ==
In 2023, Fullana published a book called "Comadreja: Historia de un suplente" (Weasel: A story of a substitute).
