= Alianza Atlético =

- Full name: Club Sport Alianza Atlético de Sullana
- Nicknames: Alianza de Oro; El Más Grande del Norte; El Vendaval; Los Churres
- Founded: 18 January 1920; 106 years ago
- Ground: Estadio Campeones del 36
- Capacity: 12,000
- Chairman: Lander Alemán
- Manager: Federico Urciuoli
- League: Liga 1
- 2025: Liga 1, 5th of 19
- Website: clubalianzasullana.com
Home colours	Away colours

Club Alianza Atlético de Sullana, shorted to Alianza Atlético, is a Peruvian professional football club, located in the city of Sullana. The club was founded in 1920 and promoted to the Peruvian Primera División, where they currently participate, in 1988 and again in 2015. Alianza Atlético has a long-standing rivalry with Atlético Grau. They are one of the only Peruvian top-tier clubs not based in a state capital.

== History ==
=== Founding ===
A group of citizens of Sullana met on January 18, 1920, at the home of Don José Taboada More, located on the fourth block of Grau Street in the heart of the Norte neighborhood of Sullana, and founded a sports institution that over time would become called Club Sport Alianza. The name was the initiative of Don Félix Peralta, who was in charge of calling the meeting. Fernando Herrera Agudo was named the first president of the nascent institution.

The birth of Club Alianza Atlético was greeted with the whistle of the railroads, which later carried in their wagons all the players who made up the Sport Alianza teams when they played matches on the fields of Piura, Paita, Talara, Chiclayo and Trujillo.

On March 12, 1920, it merged with Club Atlético Sullana. Since that date, it began to be known as Club Alianza Atlético Sullana, or Alianza Atlético. This name has prevailed even when in 1986 the institution was registered in Public Records as Asociación Deportiva Alianza Sullana.

=== Golden era ===
The war cry "Long live Alianza de Oro" (Go Golden Alliance), which characterizes the 'Vendaval', was born from the so-called 'Golden Age' of Alianza Atlético, between 1943 and 1949. In this period, according to a compilation made by the newspaper El Tiempo some years ago, the Regional Championship won in Chiclayo in 1946 against the local Juan Aurich, the Alfonso Ugarte de Chiclín and the Octavio Espinoza of Ica, in a quadrangular that could be considered a kind of outline of what two decades later would be consolidated as the Copa Perú.

The golden age of the club came to a close with the title of a departmental quadrangular held in Talara, for the inauguration of the Estadio Campeonísimo, in 1949. The champions of four Piuran provinces participated: Gardel from Talara, Estrella Roja from Piura, Sport Arequipa from Negritos and Alianza Atlético, which won the cup thanks to its great figure of those years: the forward Mercedes Ubillús, better known as 'Negro Meche'.

=== Copa Perú campaign ===
In 1967, they won the departmental title of champion of the Copa Perú by defeating Juan de Mori from Catacaos at the Estadio Miguel Grau in Piura, which allowed them to reach the Regional Stage of the tournament. However, in the decisive match to qualify for the final, they were eliminated by Juan Aurich after being defeated 1–2.

In 1984, for the first and only time, they reached the final of the Copa Perú played in Lima, after defeating Capitán Clavero from Iquitos 1–0 in the final match. They faced Los Espartanos from Pacasmayo, Universitario from Tacna, Bella Esperanza from Cañete, Guardia Republicana and Deportivo Educación from Abancay. The churres, led by Titín Drago, won three matches, tied one and lost just one, against the champion Los Espartanos. They were left with the runner-up title and no reward.

=== Promotion to the Primera División ===
Alianza Atlético would achieve promotion to Peruvian Primera División in 1987, after winning the Intermedia Norte. Thus, since 1988, Alianza Atlético played uninterruptedly for 23 years in Primera División, in which it debuted on May 29 of that year with a 2–2 draw against Deportivo Cañaña. Its first victory came a week later in Sullana against Carlos A. Mannucci (1–0), and its first defeat was also against the Carlist team: 1–0 in Trujillo on July 17 of the same year 1988.

In 1989 it was near to classify to the Copa Libertadores of America, falling 2–0 before Sporting Cristal in an extra match that defined the Regional Tournament.

The club has 3 appearances in three international cups. The first one was in the Copa Sudamericana 2004, in the first round they defeated Coronel Bolognesi but in the second round they were eliminated by Atlético Junior. Their second time that they played in an international cup was in the Copa Sudamericana 2005. In the first round they defeated Universitario and then they were eliminated by Universidad Católica. Their third time that they played in an international cup was in the Copa Sudamericana 2009. In the first round they defeated Deportivo Anzoátegui and then they were eliminated by Fluminense.

=== Downfall and return ===
After the end of the era of regional championships in the First Division, the Churres were generally placed in the last positions, with some exceptions such as when they managed to qualify for the Copa Sudamericana and some others. For this reason, in the 2011 season, after another campaign in which they did not have a good time, in addition to being a rather eventful tournament, the Sullanenses together with Colegio Nacional de Iquitos were relegated to the Peruvian Segunda División. Alianza Atlético was relegated after 23 years and lost the category for the first time.

In 2015, they gained promotion back to the Primera División because of a FIFA Resolution where they still participate.

== Stadium ==
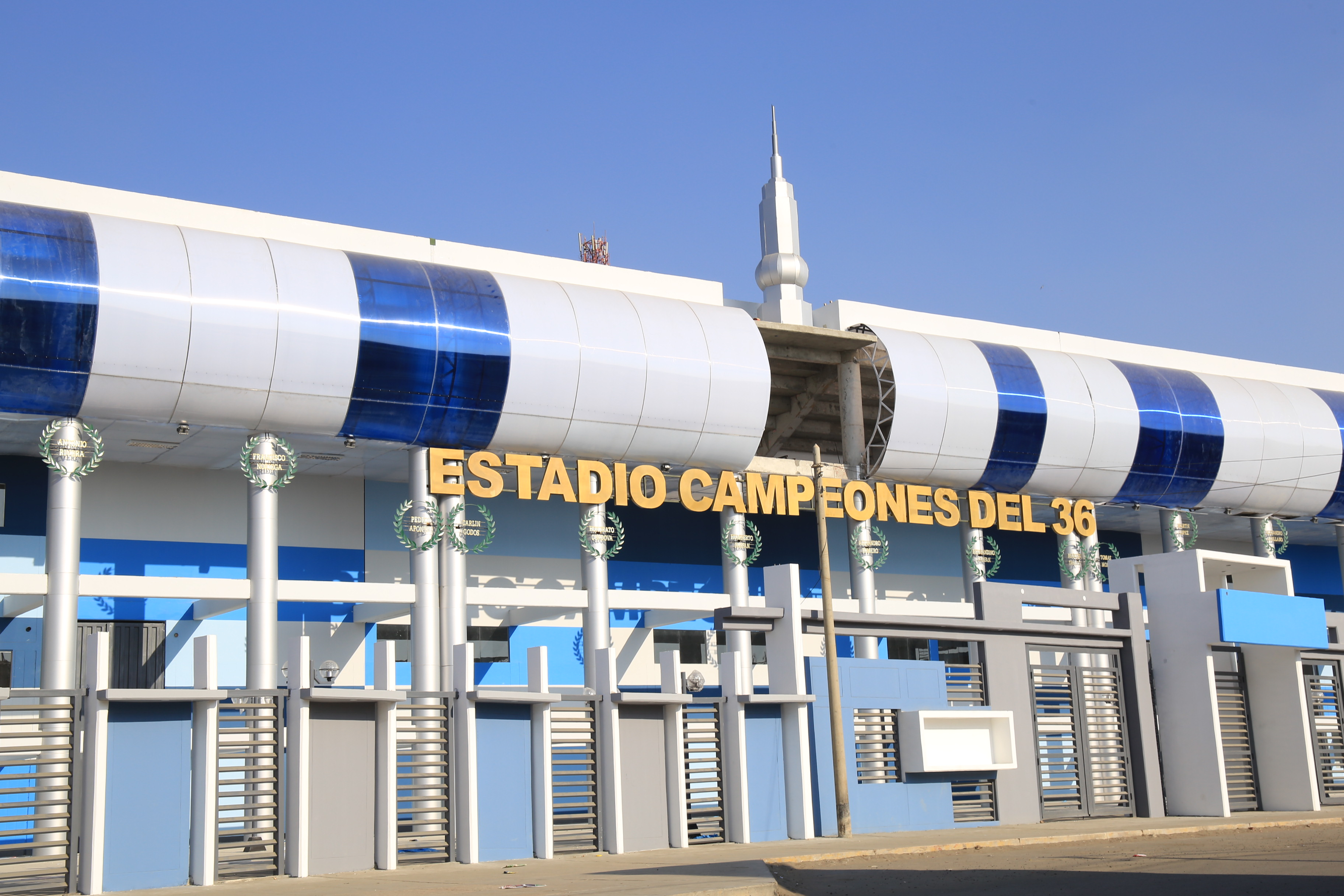
Estadio Campeones del 36

The home stadium of Alianza Atlético is Estadio Campeones del 36. The venue name, Champions of 1936, is misleading. No Peruvian League was actually played in 1936 as the national team was preparing itself to compete in the 1936 Summer Olympics in Germany. Two main theories as of the origin of the name exist. The first is that Alianza Atlético won a special national tournament (representing their home state, Piura) governed by the Peruvian Football Federation, and the name stuck despite not being recognized officially as national champions thereafter. The second is that it was named as such for the heroic campaign of the Peru national football team at the 1936 Olympic football tournament over the controversial Peru vs. Austria quarterfinals match.

In 2024, with help from the Peruvian Football Federation, Alianza Atlético opened their own training ground in Sullana known as the Villa Deportiva Alianza Sullana. It became one of the few Peruvian football club to have its own training ground. The training ground includes three playing fields and a gym. It is owned and used by the club but is also open to the public and smaller clubs. T

== Rivalries ==
Alianza Atlético also has a long-standing rivalry with Atlético Grau and Atlético Torino, other clubs in the Piura department. These three clubs are among the largest in the north and in Piura. These rivalries are known as the Clasico Piurano.

Although Alianza Atlético is the biggest team in Sullana, it has always faced Jorge Chávez as a bitter historical rival. There is a marked rivalry with the Aviador squad, which remains alive in the clashes in the Sullana District League, when the Alianza Atlético subsidiary squad faces the Aviador squad.

== Current squad ==
As of 24 September2026.

Note: Flags indicate national team as defined under FIFA eligibility rules; some limited exceptions apply. Players may hold more than one non-FIFA nationality.

No.	Pos.	Nation	Player
2	DF	ARG	Román Suárez
4	DF	ARG	José Villegas
6	DF	PER	José Luján
8	MF	PER	Franchesco Flores
9	FW	ARG	Valentín Robaldo
10	MF	ARG	Germán Díaz
11	FW	PER	Guillermo Larios
15	DF	PER	Hernan Lupu
16	MF	PER	Stefano Fernández
17	FW	ECU	Cristian Penilla
19	DF	PER	Jesús Mendieta
20	MF	PER	Jimmy Pérez
21	DF	PER	Erick Perleche

No.	Pos.	Nation	Player
22	MF	PER	Jorge del Castillo
23	MF	ARG	Ariel Muñoz
24	DF	PER	Anthony Gordillo
25	DF	PER	Williams Guzmán
27	FW	ARG	José María Ingratti (on loan from Mitre)
28	GK	PER	Jesus Rossi
29	FW	COL	Jairo Molina
31	GK	PER	Steven Rivadeneyra (on loan from Sport Boys)
37	MF	PER	Juan Delgado
40	DF	PER	Juan Quiñones
77	FW	PER	Cristhian Valladolid
95	GK	PER	Daniel Prieto

== Honours ==
=== Senior titles ===
Keys

- Record
- ^{(s)} Shared record

Type	Competition	Titles	Runner-up	Winning years	Runner-up years
National (League)	Liga 2	1	—	2020	—
National (League)	Intermedia (1984–1987)	1	—	1987 Zona Norte	—
National (League)	Copa Perú	—	1	—	1984
Half-year / Short tournament (League)	Torneo Clausura	—	1	—	2003
Half-year / Short tournament (League)	Torneo Regional	—	1	—	1989–I
Half-year / Short tournament (League)	Torneo Zona Norte	5	—	1988, 1989–I, 1989–II, 1990–II, 1991–II	—
National (Cups)	Copa de la Liga	—	1	—	2026
Regional (League)	Región Norte A	—	2	—	1967, 1969
Regional (League)	Liga Departamental de Piura	4	4	1966, 1968, 1983, 1986	1967, 1969, 1970, 1971
Regional (League)	Liga Provincial del Sullana	3	—	1976, 1983, 1986	—
Regional (League)	Liga Distrital del Sullana	35	—	1928, 1929, 1930, 1933, 1934, 1935, 1943, 1944, 1945, 1946, 1947, 1948, 1949, 1951, 1952, 1953, 1957, 1958, 1959, 1960, 1966, 1967, 1968, 1969, 1970, 1971, 1972, 1973, 1975, 1976, 1977, 1981, 1982, 1983, 1986	—

== Performance in CONMEBOL competitions ==
- Copa Sudamericana: 4 appearances

2004: Preliminary Round
2005: First Round
2009: Round of 16
2026: Group stage

=== Alianza Atlético in South America ===
Season	Competition	Round	Country	Club	Home Leg	Away Leg	Aggregate
2004	Copa Sudamericana	Preliminary phase: Colombia/Peru	(Peru)	Coronel Bolognesi	4–1	1–0	4–2
2004	Copa Sudamericana	Preliminary phase: Colombia/Peru	(Colombia)	Junior	0–2	4–1	1–6
2005	Copa Sudamericana	Preliminary phase: Chile/Peru	(Peru)	Universitario	1–1	1–1	2–2 (4–1p)
2005	Copa Sudamericana	Preliminary phase: Chile/Peru	(Chile)	Universidad Católica	2–0	5–0	2–5
2009	Copa Sudamericana	First Stage	(Venezuela)	Deportivo Anzoátegui	0–0	1–2	2–1
2009	Copa Sudamericana	Round of 16	(Brazil)	Fluminense	2–2	4–1	3–6
2026	Copa Sudamericana	First Stage	(Peru)	Deportivo Garcilaso	2–0		2–0

== Managers ==
- (Peru) Titín Drago (1984)
- (Argentina) Vito Andrés Bártoli (1988)
- (Peru) José Fernández (1989)
- (Peru) José del Castillo (1989–1990)
- (Argentina) Vito Andrés Bártoli (1990–1991)
- (Peru) Julio Gómez (1992)
- (Argentina) Vito Andrés Bártoli (1992)
- (Peru) Ronald Amoretti Cavero (1993)
- (Argentina) Vito Andrés Bártoli (1993–1994)
- (Peru) Rafael Abelardo Castañeda Castañeda (1994)
- (Peru) Oreste Passapera / Roberto Aliaga Tovar (1994)
- (Peru) Titín Drago (1994)
- (Argentina) (Peru) Ramón Quiroga (1995)
- (Peru) Roberto Aliaga Tovar / Gustavo Vallejo (1995)
- (Peru) Freddy Ternero (1995)
- (Uruguay) Juan Ramón Silva 1996
- (Argentina) Vito Andrés Bártoli (1996)
- (Peru) Rufino Bernales (1997)
- (Chile) Miguel Ángel Arrué (1997)
- (Peru) Teddy Cardama (1997–1999)
- (Peru) Mario Palacios (1999)
- (Paraguay) Mario Jacquet (1999)
- (Peru) Rafael Castillo (2000–2001)
- (Peru) Mario Palacios (2001)
- (Peru) Teddy Cardama (2002)
- (Colombia) José Torres (2002)
- (Peru) Mario Palacios (2002)
- (Peru) Eduardo Malásquez (2003)
- (Peru) Johano Bermúdez Montero (2003)
- (Peru) Teddy Cardama (2003–2004)
- (Peru) Mario Palacios (2004)
- (Peru) Teddy Cardama (2005)
- (Colombia) José Torres (2005)
- (Uruguay) Omar Gárate (2006)
- (Peru) Mario Palacios (2006)
- (Peru) Eduardo Asca (2006–2007)
- (Peru) Teddy Cardama (2007–2010)
- (Peru) Héctor Valle Jiménez (Interino) (2010)
- (Peru) Johano Bermúdez Montero (2010)
- (Argentina) Roque Alfaro (2011)
- (Peru) Roberto Arrelucea (2011)
- (Peru) Héctor Valle Jiménez (2012–2013)
- (Peru) Jorge Gómez Barrios (2014)
- (Peru) Teddy Cardama (2015)
- (Uruguay) (Peru) Gustavo Roverano (2016)
- (Peru) Miguel Miranda (2017)
- (Peru) Teddy Cardama Gallardo (Interino) (2017)
- (Argentina) Nahuel Martínez (2017)
- (Peru) Jorge Arteaga (2017)
- (Colombia) Walter Aristizábal (2017)
- (Argentina) (Italy) Flavio Robatto (2018)
- (Peru) Guido Medina (2018–2019)
- (Peru) Orlando Lavalle (2019)
- (Uruguay) (Peru) Gustavo Roverano (2019)
- (Peru) Teddy Cardama (2020)
- (Peru) Jahir Butrón (2020–2021)
- (Peru) Teddy Cardama (2021)
- (Peru) Héctor Valle Jiménez (2001)
- (Argentina) Marcelo Vivas (2021)
- (Uruguay) (Peru) Mario Viera (2022)
- (Argentina) Carlos Desio (2023)
- (Peru) Jorge Ágapo Gonzales (Interino) (2023)
- (Argentina) (Italy) Carlos Compagnucci (2023)
- (Argentina) (Paraguay) Luciano Theiler (2024)
- (Argentina) Gerardo Ameli (2024–2025)
- (Argentina) Federico Urciuoli (2026–)
