= Carlos A. Mannucci =

Peruvian football team

- Full name: Club Social y Deportivo Carlos A. Mannucci
- Nicknames: El Grifo; La Tricolor; Los Carlistas; Los Mannuccistas; El Automotriz
- Founded: 16 November 1959; 67 years ago
- Ground: Estadio Mansiche
- Capacity: 25,036
- Chairman: Raúl Lozano Peralta
- Manager: Mario Viera
- League: Liga 2
- 2024: Liga 1, 16th of 18 (relegated)
- Website: www.camannucci.com
Home colours	Away colours	Third colours

Carlos A. Mannucci, known simply as Mannucci, is a professional football club based in Trujillo, La Libertad, Peru. The club is the most important in the city, having represented Trujillo in the first division of Peruvian football in multiple occasions since the late 1960s. It is historically considered the most successful club in Trujillo. The club currently plays in the Peruvian Segunda División

Its greatest accomplishment are its back-to-back Copa Perú championships and the three Regional Championships of Peru, Northern Zone (1985, 1987, 1991-I). The club has a long rivalry with Alfonso Ugarte de Chiclin, and matches between the two teams are known as ''El Clásico Trujillano''. In recent years, it has also developed a rivalry against the other professional club in the city, Universidad César Vallejo.

Along with a men's football team, Mannucci also has a women's football team that participates in the Liga Femenina, the top league of Peruvian women's football.

== History ==
=== Establishment ===
Carlos A. Mannucci was founded as a multi-sport club on November 16, 1959 at the request of a group of female volleyball players who had until then been sponsored by Trujillo's Victor Lazarte Hospital. They requested the patronage of local businessman Carlos José Mannucci Vega and his mother Laura Vega de Mannucci who created the club in honor of their late father and husband Carlos Alberto Mannucci Finochetti.

The club first competed in local volleyball and basketball competitions with funding from the Carlos A. Mannucci Company. Eventually the club started participating in local football competitions after buying the spot of Club Mariscal Ramón Castilla. Its first season of competition was 1967.

=== Back-to-back Copa Perú titles ===
Just a year later, Los Carlistas reached the 1968 Copa Perú final in Lima and obtained promotion to the first division that same year. The last game on the final group stage was against Melgar from Arequipa. It defeated the Arequipa-side by 1–0 with a goal by Carlos Avalos.

The club's first spell on the top flight was short-lived as relegation during the 1968 Torneo Descentralizado consisted of one club from Lima and one from outside Lima. Out of the four provincial teams, Mannucci finished last in ninth place and was thus relegated back to the Copa Perú. The highlight of that campaign was a victory on the road against tournament favorites Alianza Lima by 1–2. That game was played at Alianza Lima's rivals' stadium, Estadio Teodoro Lolo Fernández.

Their time away from the first division was short. Mannucci, with Paraguayan Miguel Ortega as coach defeated Melgar by 2–0 to win the 1969 Copa Perú, with goals from Jorge García and Alejandro Zevallos.

=== National tournaments ===
They were one of the eight teams added to the national top-level for the 1974 season.

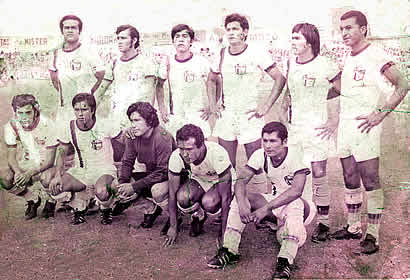
Carlos A. Mannucci's squad in 1973

They won the Regional (Norte) stage of the national championship in 1985, 1987, and 1991 (first tournament).

The club's final relegation came in 1994. The relegation played until the last match-day. Cienciano managed a scoreless draw against Unión Minas which gave it an extra point over the Trujillo-side which earlier that day defeated Melgar, with two goals by Fabían Arias, but was not able to avoid relegation.

=== Relevant Copa Perú campaigns ===
Los Grifos were not able to obtain promotion since 1994 participating in the Copa Perú for most of the 1990s and all of the 2000s. While the team was always strong enough to overcome the local Trujillo district and provincial leagues, it found itself at an impasse in the Regional stage of the tournament which it was unable to overcome some nine times.

The club's best season of all its years in the Copa Perú was the 2009 season under the leadership of club president Daniel Salaverry. That year Mannucci overcame the Regional stage by defeating Ramón Castilla, Deportivo Municipal de San Ignacio, and Unión Tarapoto in group B. Its biggest challenge was San Francisco de Asis in the Round of 16. The first leg was for San Francisco de Asis which defeated Mannucci in Trujillo by 1–0. The second leg was played in Bagua. At the 75th minute, Juan Paico scored in a very even match. Two minutes later Luis Noriega scored a second to give the Trujillo-side the advantage necessary to move on to the quarter-finals.

=== Second Division spell ===
Carlos A. Mannucci did not reach the Copa Perú national stage again for another five years until 2013. It defeated Unión Deportiva Chulucanas in the Round of 16 but was unable to overcome Willy Serrato in the quarterfinals. Yet because of the team's great performance that season, it was invited to participate in the Second Division tournament for the first time in its history.

The club finished in 3rd place with 56 points in the 2014 season. It was deducted three points because it showed political advertisement for politician Joaquín Ramírez.

=== 2018 promotion to the First Division ===
The Peruvian Football Federation took control of the local domestic league from the Professional Football Sports Association, the tournament organizers, in 2018 and announced that the Peruvian first division tournament would be re-branded for 2019. With this re-branding, the tournament was expand from 16 to 18 teams. At the beginning of the 2018 season, it was announced that the teams that finished 2nd and 3rd in the bottom two tiers of the Peruvian football league system would compete on the promotion play-offs at the end of the year to decide which two teams would receive the expansion slots.

== Kits and crest ==
The first kit worn by Carlos A. Mannucci consisted of a black jersey and black shorts without any markings or crest. This style was used approximately until 1968. Since then the team's kits have been blue with white and red highlights which represent the colors of the city of Trujillo. The team's away kit is predominantly white with blue and red highlights.

1959–1974

1975–1986

1987–2004

2005

== Stadium ==
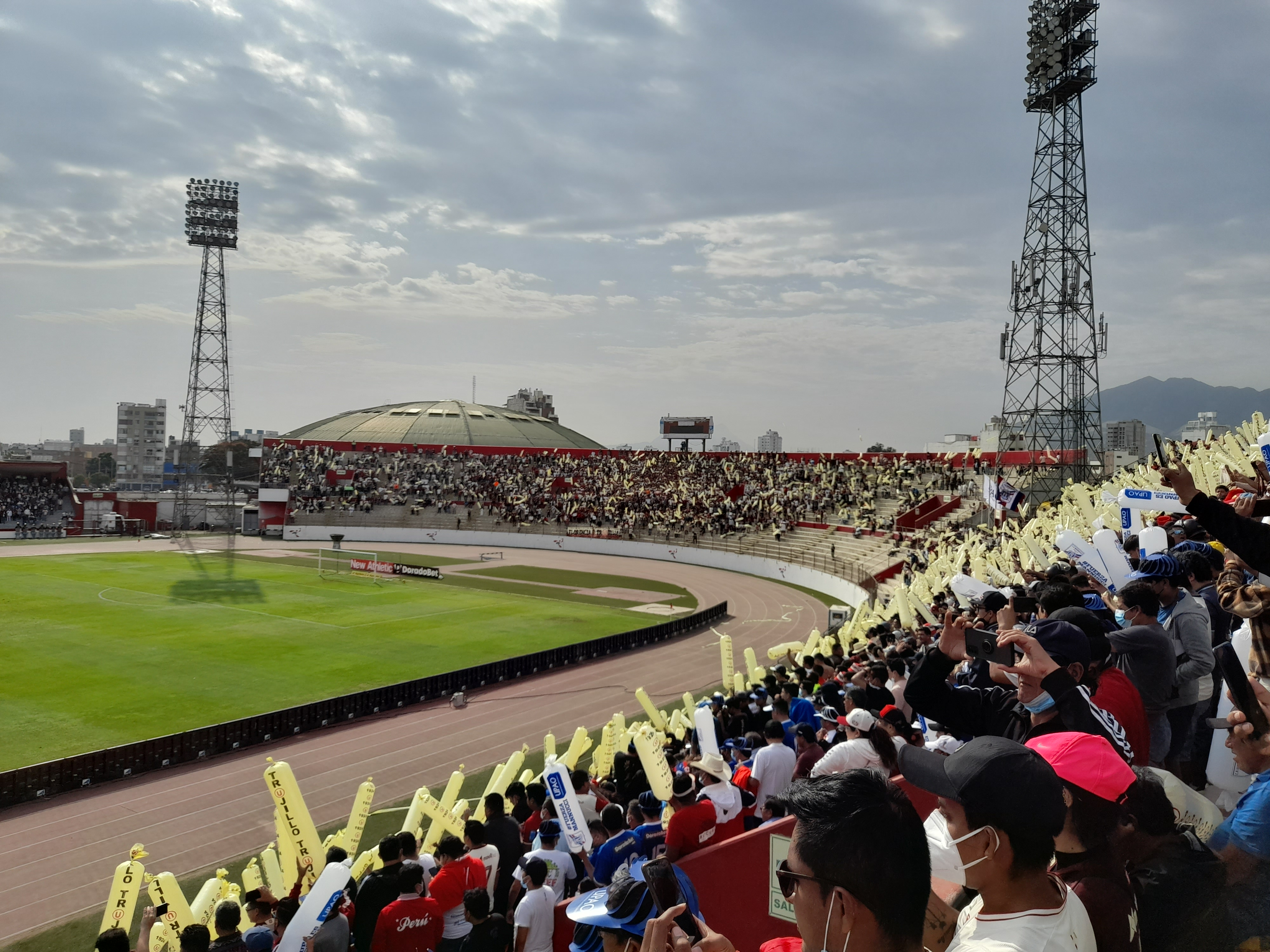
Estadio Mansiche

Their home stadium is Estadio Mansiche, which has a capacity of 25,036. They share the stadium with rivals Club Universidad César Vallejo. The stadium is part of the Mansiche Sports Complex and has hosted numerous events, most notably the 2004 Copa América, and 2005 FIFA U-17 World Championship. It was also the primary venue for the 2013 Bolivarian Games. The stadium features four stands, a grass pitch and a running track.

The stadium was built between 1944 and 1946 and opened on 12 October 1946 with an initial capacity of 5,000. The stadium was expanded to a capacity of 14,000 in 1984 so Sporting Cristal could use the stadium during the 1984 Copa Libertadores. Estadio Mansiche also hosted matches of the 1995 South American U-17 Championship. In preparation for the 2004 Copa América, the stadium was expanded once again to a capacity of 25,000.

== Rivalries ==
Carlos A. Mannucci has long-standing rivalries with Club Deportivo Universidad César Vallejo and Alfonso Ugarte de Chiclín, both also from Trujillo. These rivalries are known as El Clásico Trujillano. Mannucci also has a rivalry with Juan Aurich of Chiclayo. This rivalry is known as El Clásico del Norte. Mannucci's rivalry with Universidad César Vallejo is the largest in the city and among the largest in the league.

== Current squad ==
As of 31 January 2024 Note: Flags indicate national team as defined under FIFA eligibility rules; some limited exceptions apply. Players may hold more than one non-FIFA nationality.

No.	Pos.	Nation	Player
1	GK	PER	Juniors Barbieri
2	DF	PER	Alexis Cossio
4	DF	PER	Emilio Saba (on loan from Melgar)
5	DF	PER	Marcelo Gaona
6	MF	PAR	Gustavo Viera
7	FW	LBN	Alexander Succar (on loan from Universitario)
10	MF	URU	Nicolás Albarracín
12	GK	PER	Manuel Heredia
13	DF	PER	Mathías Llontop
14	DF	ARG	Matías Cortave
15	MF	PER	Christian Velarde
16	MF	PAR	Ángel Benítez
17	FW	PER	Percy Liza

No.	Pos.	Nation	Player
19	DF	URU	Pablo Míguez
21	FW	PER	Jhonny Vidales
22	MF	URU	Luis Urruti
23	MF	PER	Willyan Mimbela
24	DF	URU	Gonzalo Rizzo
26	GK	PER	Emile Franco
27	DF	PER	Eduardo Rabanal
30	GK	PER	Luis Reategui
32	DF	PER	Victor Salazar
33	MF	PER	Paolo Hurtado
38	MF	PER	Celso Rojas
77	MF	PER	Bryan Urrutia

== Honours ==
=== Senior titles ===
Keys

- Record
- ^{(s)} Shared record

Type	Competition	Titles	Runner-up	Winning years	Runner-up years
National (League)	Segunda División	—	1	—	2018
National (League)	Cuadrangular de Ascenso	1^{(s)}	—	2018	—
National (League)	Intermedia (1984–1987)	1	1	1984 Zona Norte	1986 Zona Norte
National (League)	Copa Perú	2	—	1968, 1969	—
Half-year / Short tournament (League)	Torneo Zona Norte	3	—	1985, 1987, 1991–I	—
National (Cups)	Copa Bicentenario	—	1	—	2021
Regional (League)	Región I	4	1	1968, 1969, 1973, 2009	2013
Regional (League)	Liga Departamental de La Libertad	7	6	1967, 1973, 1996, 2000, 2008, 2010, 2012	1982, 2006, 2007, 2009, 2011, 2013
Regional (League)	Liga Provincial de Trujillo	1	5	2008	2002, 2006, 2007, 2009, 2013
Regional (League)	Liga Distrital de Trujillo	12	4	1967, 1973, 1980, 1982, 1996, 1998, 2000, 2002, 2006, 2007, 2008, 2013	1964, 1965, 1981, 2009

== Performance in CONMEBOL competitions ==
- Copa Sudamericana: 1 appearance

2021: First Stage

== Women’s football ==
Type	Competition	Titles	Runner-up	Winning years	Runner-up years
National (League)	Liga Femenina	—	1	—	2022

== Managers ==
Caretaker coaches are in italics.

- (Peru) Julio César Uribe (1993-1994)
- (Peru) José Fernández Santini (1994)
- (Peru) Juan Caballero (1994)
- (Peru) Luis Pau (1994)
- (Argentina) Sergio Pereyra (1994)
- (Paraguay) César Cubilla (1994-1995)
- (Peru) Fernando Cuéllar (1995)
- (Argentina) Sergio Pereyra (1996)
- (Peru) Ramón Mifflin (1996)
- (Peru) Jorge Jaramillo (1996-1997)
- (Peru) Ramón Mifflin (1997)
- (Peru) Miguel Ángel Guzmán (1997)
- (Peru) Dagoberto Olivares (1998)
- (Peru) Carlos García (1998)
- (Peru) Ramón Mifflin (1998-1999)
- (Peru) Carlos Delgado (1999-2000)
- (Peru) Óscar Villalobos (2000)
- (Peru) Salomón Paredes (2001)
- (Argentina) Mario Villegas (2002)
- (Peru) Alejandro Mallqui (2003)
- (Argentina) Héctor Arias (2003-2004)
- (Argentina) Miguel Ángel Fullana (2004)
- (Peru) Pedro Cruz (2005-2006)
- (Peru) Carlos Delgado (2007)
- (Peru) Rufino Bernales (2008)
- (Peru) Roberto Arrelucea (2009)
- (Peru) Rufino Bernales (2010)
- (Argentina) (Peru) Horacio Baldessari (2011)
- (Peru) Christian Muñoz (2012)
- (Peru) Ramón Mifflin (2012)
- (Peru) Eusebio Salazar (2013)
- (Peru) Roberto Arrelucea (2013-2014)
- (Peru) José Soto (2014-2015)
- (Peru) Mitchell Silva (2015)
- (Peru) Carlos Delgado (2015)
- (Peru) Elke Cárdenas (2015)
- (Peru) Julio García (2015-2016)
- (Peru) Juan Carlos Cabanillas (2016)
- (Peru) Teddy Cardama (2016-2017)
- (Peru) Rafael Castillo (2017)
- (Peru) José Soto (2018-2019)
- (Uruguay) Pablo Peirano (2019)
- (Argentina) Juan Manuel Llop (2020)
- (Uruguay) Pablo Peirano (2020-2021)
- (Mexico) Enrique Maximiliano Meza (2021-2022)
- (Uruguay) Mario Saralegui (2022)
- (Peru) Óscar Gambetta (2022)
- (Argentina) Jorge Pautasso (2022)
- (Uruguay) Mario Viera (2023)
- (Peru) Franco Navarro (2024)
- (Brazil) Milton Mendes (2024)
- (Peru) Salomón Paredes (2024)
- (Argentina) Pablo Rubinich (2025)
- (Peru) Luis Cordero (2025)
