= Alianza Universidad =

Association football club in Peru

- Full name: Club Social Deportivo y Cultural Alianza Universidad
- Nicknames: Aliancistas; Azulgranas
- Founded: 1 January 1939; 87 years ago
- Ground: Estadio Heraclio Tapia
- Capacity: 25,000
- Chairman: Fernando Corcino
- Manager: Roberto Mosquera
- League: Liga 2
- 2025: Liga 1, 18th of 19 (relegated)
Home colours	Away colours	Third colours

Club Social Deportivo y Cultural Alianza Universidad de Huánuco, popularly known as Alianza Universidad or Alianza Huanuco, is a Peruvian professional football club, based in the city of Huánuco. The club was founded in 1939 under a merger between Sport Grau and Jorge Chávez in Huánuco. They currently play in the Peruvian Primera División, the top tier of Peruvian football, after gaining promotion from winning the 2024 Liga 2 for the first time.

Alianza Universidad are 8 time Liga Departamental de Huánuco winners, 2 time Districal and Provincial winners, and 3 time Region V winners. They were also runners-up of the 2018 Copa Perú and won the Liga 2 for the first time in 2024. Alianza Universidad has had a longstanding rivalry with León de Huánuco called the Clásico Huanuqueño.

The club plays their home games at Estadio Heraclio Tapia in their home city Huánuco. Opened in 1972, the stadium has a capacity of 25,000 and the club shares the stadium with rivals León de Huánuco.

== History ==
=== Beginnings (1939) ===
It was founded on January 1, 1939 with the name of Club Social Deportivo Alianza Huánuco, or Alianza Huaunco, after the merger of the teams Sport Grau (from the Tingo neighborhood) and Jorge Chávez (from the traditional Huánuco neighborhood of Iscuchaca Dulce). Its first shirt was divided into two halves to represent its two merger clubs, red (Jorge Chávez) and navy blue (Grau).

=== First appearance in top flight (1990-1992) ===
In 1990, during the Regional Championships stage, it was champion of Region V and promoted to the Peruvian Primera División after beating the champion of Region VI, Social Magdalena de Ayacucho.

Alianza Universidad participated in the 1991 Torneo Descentralizado with little success, as it barely achieved 9 points, and due to the reduction of teams for the following season, it would not achieve its qualification for the 1992 season, losing the category and being relegated to the Copa Perú.

=== Copa Perú campaign (2007-2011) ===
In the 2011 Copa Perú, the club qualified to the National Stage, but was eliminated by Real Garcilaso in the semifinals. Despite not qualifying for the tournament, Alianza Universidad was invited to play in the 2012 Peruvian Segunda Division. Alianza Universidad played in the Segunda División tournament five seasons from 2012 until 2016. After not much success with gaining promotion, the team decided to retire from the tournament and returned to the Copa Perú in 2017.

In 2018, Alianza Universidad was crowned champion of the Ligas Departamentales de Huánuco, which led it to qualify for the national stage of the 2018 Copa Perú. Its participation in the regular phase of said stage led it to play a playoff against Huamantanga from Junín, in which it emerged victorious. Its next rivals would be the historic Alfonso Ugarte and Atlético Torino, whom it beat in the quarterfinals and round of 16, respectively. Its good participation led the team to the final four of the tournament. Despite its good performance in the final phase, the goal difference gave the Copa Perú title to Pirata and Alianza Universidad had to settle for runner-up.

=== Invitation to the Segunda División (2012-2016) ===
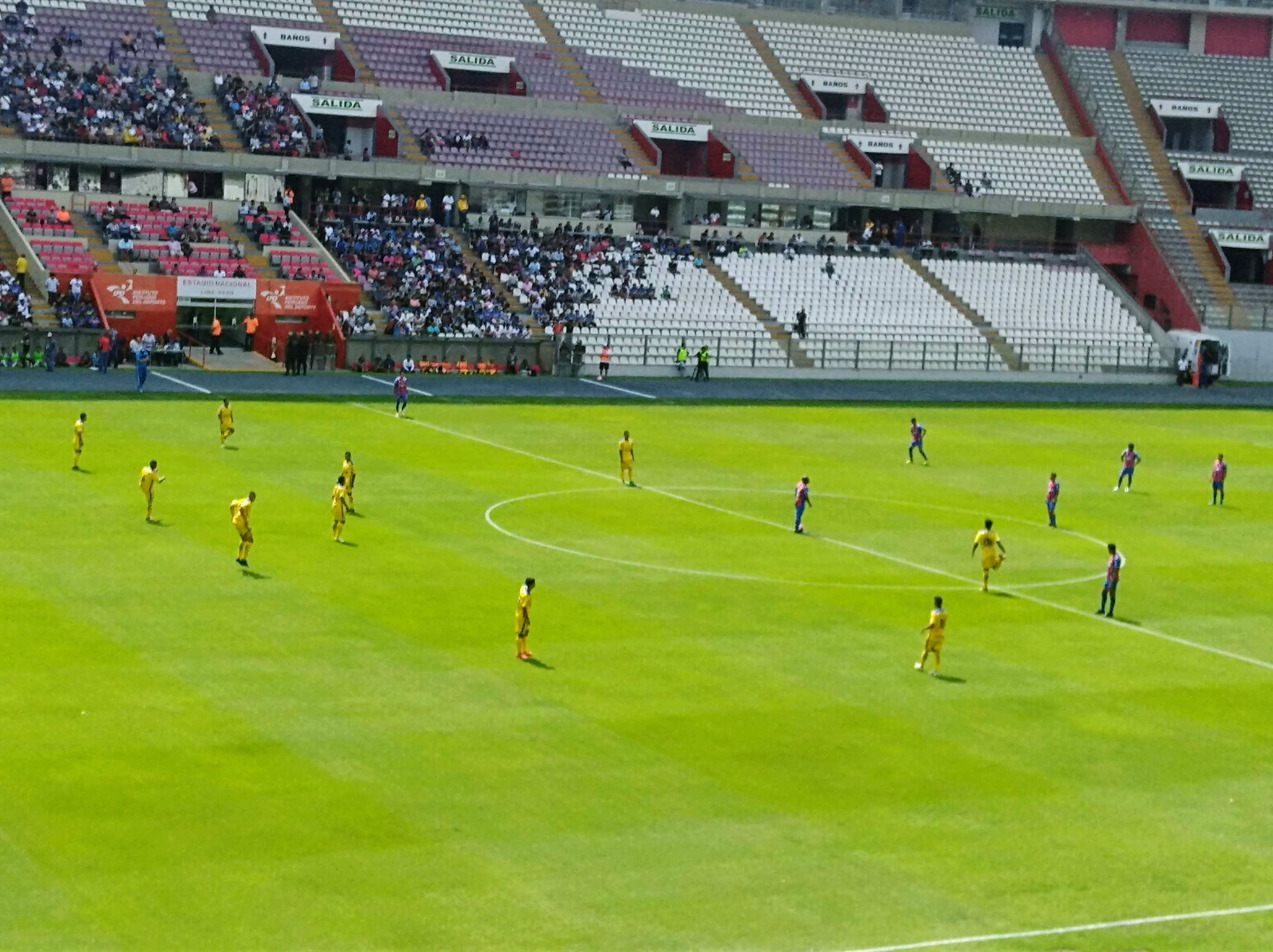
Alianza Universidad vs Santos in the 2018 Copa Perú.

But not everything was lost for the Huánuco team. The Peruvian Football Federation (FPF) announced that two teams would not be promoted to the top division, as was common; but that four teams would reach the Primera División. The teams from the Segunda División and Copa Perú that finished second and third that year would fight for the two remaining spots in a promotion quadrangular. Alianza Universidad participated in this tournament along with the third place team from the Copa Perú, Santos; and the two teams from the Segunda Division: Carlos A. Mannucci and Cienciano. Thanks to their draws against Cienciano and Mannucci, along with their victory against Santos, Alianza Universidad sealed their return to the Primera Division.

=== Return to the Primera División (2018-2020) ===
In 2019, the Torneo Descentralizado (Primera Division) was renamed to the Liga 1. Alianza Universidad made their debut in Liga 1 with a 0-0 draw against Academia Cantolao at home and ended their participation with a 0-1 home defeat against Universidad César Vallejo, finishing in 12th place in the cumulative table, the overall campaign was regular.

In the 2020 season, the team had a good start, being the leader until March, when the tournament was suspended due to the COVID-19 pandemic in the country. After the return of football, the blue and red team could not recover and were in 10th place with 37 points, which left the team out of all international competitions.

=== Liga 2 campaign and reappearance in top flight (2021-Present) ===
Arriving at Liga 1 in 2021, despite the fact that at first the team was fighting in international tournaments, little by little it began to deflate during the second stage of the championship, achieving a streak of games without being able to win during the closing of the campaign, thus having to fight relegation from which it did not escape. Alianza Universidad lost the category on the last date after falling 1-2 against Ayacucho FC, finishing as last in the tournament with just 23 points, being relegated to the Liga 2.

On its return to the Liga 2, the Huánuco team began with a poor performance during the first stage of the championship, collecting only 11 points and 2 victories during the opening tournament. In the closing tournament it would rise, achieving 19 points and 5 victories. In this way, the team finishes in 8th position with 29 points, still without a chance of anything. In the 2023 Liga 2, Alianza Universidad placed third on the table, qualifying to Ligiulla semi-finals. They reached the final, against Los Chankas and drew 4-4 on aggregate, thus going on to penalties. Alianza Universidad lost the promotion to the Liga 1 2-3 on penalties.

In the 2024 season, the team would not be left behind after the previous season and they finished as leaders of the Zona Norte with 29 points, qualifying for the next phase of the championship with a 2 point bonus for finishing first. Reaching the next stage of the tournament, the good performance would continue after being again leaders now in Group A with 24 points, thus qualifying directly for the semi-finals of the tournament. Once the semif-inals were defined, their rival was Santos, the blue-and-red were superior and unstoppable both in the first and second leg against their rival and with a 5-1 aggregate (2-1 in Nazca and 3-0 in Huánuco) they achieved the long-awaited promotion to the highest division of Peruvian soccer. For the first time, Alianza Universidad won the Liga 2, defeating ADC Juan Pablo II College in the final.

== Stadium ==
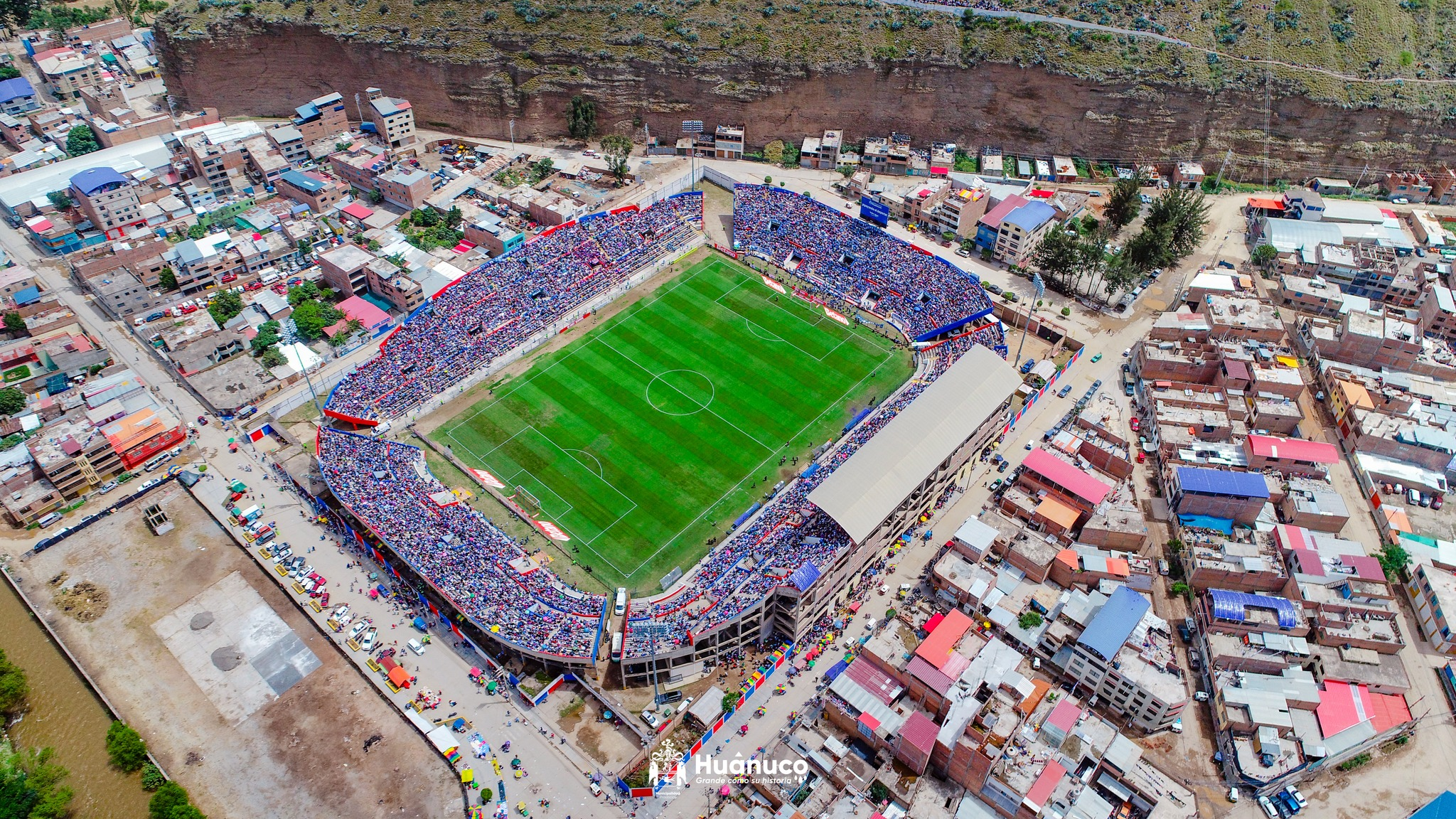
Alianza Universidad fans at the Estadio Heraclio Tapia during their debut in the 2025 Liga 1.

The Estadio Heraclio Tapia is the home stadium of Alianza Universidad and is located in the city of Huánuco, on the straight of Jirón León de Huánuco. The club shares the stadium with city rivals, León de Huánuco. The Estadio Heraclio Tapia was opened in 1972 with an initial capacity of 18,000. when Leon de Huaunco qualified for the First Division. After being remodeled in 2010, it has a capacity of 25,000 spectators. It had its most glorious moments in the 90s, when the Torneo Descentralizado was played there.

Alianza Universidad uses the facilities of the University of Huánuco, which has an extensive university campus five minutes from the city center in a town called La Esperanza. In this facility they have a training field that does not have optimal conditions for work, but it is still very useful because in Huánuco there is a lack of playing fields..

== Rivalries ==
Alianza Universidad's traditional rival is León de Huánuco, with whom they dispute the Clásico Huanuqueño. Both share the majority of preferences among the population of Huánuco. They both share the same home stadium, Estadio Heraclio Tapia.

== Current squad ==
As of 10 September, 2025

Note: Flags indicate national team as defined under FIFA eligibility rules; some limited exceptions apply. Players may hold more than one non-FIFA nationality.

No.	Pos.	Nation	Player
1	GK	PER	Pedro Ynamine
3	DF	PER	Benjamín Ampuero
5	DF	PER	Carlos Ascues
6	DF	COL	Jhon Ibargüen
7	DF	PER	Alexi Gómez
8	MF	PER	Marcos Lliuya
9	FW	PAR	Diego Martínez
11	MF	COL	Omar Vásquez
12	GK	PER	Eduardo Figueroa
13	MF	PER	Alvaro Gonzales
14	DF	PER	Brayan Guevara
15	MF	PER	Nilton Ramirez
16	MF	PER	Raúl Tapia
17	FW	COL	Yorleys Mena
18	MF	PER	Alexis Fernández
19	DF	PER	Jesús Mendieta

No.	Pos.	Nation	Player
20	FW	PER	Jeremy Canela
22	MF	PER	Rick Campodónico
23	MF	PER	Jesús Barco
24	FW	PER	Diego Saffadi
26	DF	PER	Gerson Iraola
27	DF	PER	Juan Cámara
28	DF	PER	Aldair Perleche
29	FW	ECU	Joffré Escobar
30	FW	PER	Jack Durán
31	GK	PER	Ítalo Espinoza
33	DF	BRA	Otavio Gut
38	MF	PER	Jorginho Sernaqué
66	DF	PER	Pablo Fuentes
88	MF	PER	Edson Aubert
—	MF	PER	Ray Gómez

== Honours ==
=== Senior titles ===
Keys

- Record
- ^{(s)} Shared record

Type	Competition	Titles	Runner-up	Winning years	Runner-up years
National (League)	Segunda División	1	—	2024	—
National (League)	Cuadrangular de Ascenso	—	1	—	2018
National (League)	Copa Perú	—	1	—	2018
Regional (League)	Región V	3	—	2008, 2009, 2011	—
Regional (League)	Región VI	—	1	—	2007
Regional (League)	Liga Departamental de Huánuco	8	1	1989, 2004, 2008, 2009, 2010, 2011, 2017, 2018	2007
Regional (League)	Liga Superior de Huánuco	2	1	2008, 2009	2010
Regional (League)	Liga Provincial de Huánuco	2	—	1989, 2018	—
Regional (League)	Liga Distrital de Huánuco	2	—	1989, 2018	—

== See also ==
- List of football clubs in Peru
- Peruvian football league system
- Copa Perú
