= 2014 in Peruvian football =

Football in Peru
- Season: 2014

Men's football
- Torneo Descentralizado: Sporting Cristal
- Segunda División: Deportivo Municipal
- Copa Perú: Sport Loreto

The 2014 season in Peruvian football included all the matches of the different national male and female teams, as well as the local club tournaments. It also included the participation of these teams in international competitions in which representatives of the country's teams had participated.

== National teams ==
=== Peru national football team ===
==== Friendlies ====
30 May Friendly	England	3–0	Peru	London
20:00 BST (UTC+1)	Sturridge 32'; Cahill 65'; Jagielka 70'	Report		Stadium: Wembley Stadium; Attendance: 62,103; Referee: Viktor Kassai (HUN)

3 June Friendly	Switzerland	2–0	Peru	Lucerne
20:30 CET (UTC+1)	Lichtsteiner 78'; Shaqiri 84'	Report		Stadium: Swissporarena; Attendance: 15,000; Referee: Daniel Stefański (POL)

6 August Friendly	Peru	3–0	Panama	Lima
21:00 PET (UTC−5)	Ascues 44', 90'; Ramos 81'	Report		Stadium: Estadio Nacional; Attendance: 6,000; Referee: José Luís Espinel (ECU)

4 September Friendly	Iraq	0–2	Peru	Dubai
19:30 GST (UTC+4)		Report	Nadhim 18' (o.g.); Zambrano 26'	Stadium: Maktoum Bin Rashid Al Maktoum Stadium; Attendance: 2,000; Referee: Hamad Al Shaikh Hashmi (UAE)

9 September Friendly	Qatar	0–2	Peru	Doha
18:30 AST (UTC+3)		Report	Callens 84'; Guerrero 88'	Stadium: Khalifa International Stadium; Attendance: 4,000; Referee: Ionuț Avram (ROU)

10 October Friendly	Chile	3–0	Peru	Valparaíso
19:00 CLT (UTC−4)	Vargas 28', 53'; Medel 34'	Report		Stadium: Estadio Elías Figueroa Brander; Attendance: 17,000; Referee: Julio Quintana (PAR)

14 October Friendly	Peru	1–0	Guatemala	Lima
21:00 PET (UTC−5)	Ascues 35'	Report		Stadium: Estadio Alejandro Villanueva; Attendance: 1,000; Referee: Diego Lara (ECU)

14 November Friendly	Paraguay	2–1	Peru	Luque
19:00 PYT (UTC−4)	Á. Romero 70'; González 90+2' (pen.)	Report	Guerrero 74'	Stadium: Estadio Feliciano Cáceres; Referee: Ricardo Ribeiro (BRA)

18 November Friendly	Peru	2–1	Paraguay	Lima
20:00 PET (UTC−5)	Ascues 73', 81'	Report	Santa Cruz 42'	Stadium: Estadio Nacional; Referee: Wilmar Roldán (COL)

=== Peru women's national football team ===
==== Copa América ====
First stage

11 September 2014	Ecuador	1–0	Peru	Estadio Olímpico de Riobamba, Riobamba
19:10	Barre 84'	Report		Referee: Laura Fortunato (Argentina)

15 September 2014	Uruguay	2–1	Peru	Estadio Olímpico de Riobamba, Riobamba
19:10	Pion 30'; P. González 90+2'	Report	Flores 14'	Referee: María Belén Carvajal (Chile)

17 September 2014	Venezuela	0–0	Peru	Estadio Bellavista, Ambato
13:00		Report		Referee: Laura Fortunato (Argentina)

19 September 2014	Colombia	1–0	Peru	Estadio La Cocha, Latacunga
17:00	Rincón 39'	Report		Referee: Zulma Quiñónez (Paraguay)

=== Peru women's national under-20 football team ===
==== South American U-20 Women's Championship ====
First stage

14 January 2014	Paraguay	2–0	Peru	Estadio del Parque Liebig's, Fray Bentos
22:00	Yennifer Álvarez 22'; Godoy 78'	Report (in Spanish)		Referee: Ana Marques (Brazil)

18 January 2014	Ecuador	4–1	Peru	Estadio del Parque Liebig's, Fray Bentos
20:00	Barré 54'; Kelly Vera 58', 77'; Torres 66'	Report (in Spanish)	Flores 87' (pen.)	Referee: Yanina Mujica (Venezuela)

20 January 2014	Peru	1–2	Bolivia	Estadio del Parque Liebig's, Fray Bentos
22:00	Ramos 82'	Report (in Spanish)	Pedraza 28'; Ortiz 45'	Referee: Yeimi Martínez (Columbia)

22 January 2014	Argentina	5–1	Peru	Estadio del Parque Liebig's, Fray Bentos
20:00	Cabrera 7', 44', 78'; Cinthia Cecilia López 48'; Muñoz 80'		Martínez 79'	Referee: María Carvajal (Chile)

== Peruvian clubs in international competitions ==
=== Men's football ===
Team	2014 Copa Libertadores	2014 Copa Sudamericana
Sporting Cristal	First stage	N/A
Universitario	Group Stage	N/A
Real Garcilaso	Group Stage	N/A
Inti Gas	N/A	First stage
Alianza Lima	N/A	First stage
UTC	N/A	First stage
Universidad César Vallejo	N/A	Quarterfinals

==== Copa Libertadores ====
===== Sporting Cristal =====
First stage

January 29, 2014
19:00 UTC−5

Sporting Cristal (Peru)	2–1	(Brazil) Atlético Paranaense
Ávila 29'; Lobatón 61' (pen.)	Report	Éderson 54' (pen.)

Estadio Nacional, Lima
Attendance: 23,752
Referee: Enrique Osses (Chile)

February 5, 2014
22:00 UTC−2

Atlético Paranaense (Brazil)	2–1	(Peru) Sporting Cristal
Manoel 61'; Éderson 90+7' (pen.)	Report	Ávila 62'
Penalties
Éderson (penalty scored); Deivid (penalty missed); Mérida (penalty scored); Nathan (penalty missed); Natanael (penalty scored); Mosquito (penalty scored); Manoel (penalty scored)	5–4	(penalty scored) Lobatón; (penalty scored) Cazulo; (penalty scored) Advíncula; (penalty missed) Delgado; (penalty missed) Calcaterra; (penalty scored) Núñez; (penalty missed) Aquino

Estádio Vila Capanema, Curitiba
Attendance: 9,156
Referee: Antonio Arias (Paraguay)

===== Universitario =====
Second stage

February 11, 2014
21:30 UTC−5

Universitario (Peru)	0–1	(Argentina) Vélez Sarsfield
	Report	Canteros 80'

Estadio Monumental "U", Lima
Referee: Roddy Zambrano (Ecuador)

February 20, 2014
21:15 UTC−4

The Strongest (Bolivia)	1–0	(Peru) Universitario
Wayar 70'	Report

Estadio Hernando Siles, La Paz
Referee: Julio Quintana (Paraguay)

March 13, 2014
21:30 UTC−5

Universitario (Peru)	0–1	(Brazil) Atlético Paranaense
	Report	Duarte 67' (o.g.)

Estadio Monumental "U", Lima
Referee: Imer Machado (Colombia)

March 20, 2014
17:30 UTC−3

Atlético Paranaense (Brazil)	3–0	(Peru) Universitario
Dalton 10' (o.g.); Felipe 61'; Éderson 84'	Report

Estádio Vila Capanema, Curitiba
Referee: Patricio Polic (Chile)

March 27, 2014
21:00 UTC−5

Universitario (Peru)	3–3	(Bolivia) The Strongest
Ruidíaz 28'; C. Gonzáles 37'; Gómez 56' (pen.)	Report	Chávez 32' (o.g.); Cristaldo 65'; Reinoso 89'

Estadio Monumental "U", Lima
Referee: Hernando Buitrago (Colombia)

April 8, 2014
19:45 UTC−3

Vélez Sarsfield (Argentina)	1–0	(Peru) Universitario
Nanni 51'	Report

Estadio José Amalfitani, Buenos Aires
Referee: Carlos Ulloa (Chile)

===== Real Garcilaso =====
Second stage

February 12, 2014
19:00 UTC−5

Real Garcilaso (Peru)	2–1	(Brazil) Cruzeiro
Brítez 52'; R. Rodríguez 62'	Report	Bruno Rodrigo 20'

Estadio Huancayo, Huancayo
Referee: José Argote (Venezuela)

February 19, 2014
20:30 UTC−2

Defensor Sporting (Uruguay)	4–1	(Peru) Real Garcilaso
N. Correa 35'; Gedoz 46'; Olivera 69', 86'	Report	Ramúa 20'

Estadio Luis Franzini, Montevideo
Referee: Roddy Zambrano (Ecuador)

March 11, 2014
21:30 UTC−5

Real Garcilaso (Peru)	1–2	Universidad de Chile
V. Ferreira 36'	Report	R. Fernández 39'; Gutiérrez 76'

Estadio Huancayo, Huancayo
Referee: Wilmar Roldán (Colombia)

March 18, 2014
19:45 UTC−3

Universidad de Chile	1–0	(Peru) Real Garcilaso
Herrera 61' (pen.)	Report

Estadio Santa Laura-Universidad SEK, Independencia
Referee: Antonio Arias (Paraguay)

April 1, 2014
19:00 UTC−5

Real Garcilaso (Peru)	0–2	(Uruguay) Defensor Sporting
	Report	Amado 50'; De Arrascaeta 53'

Estadio Huancayo, Huancayo
Referee: Julio Quintana (Paraguay)

April 9, 2014
22:00 UTC−3

Cruzeiro (Brazil)	3–0	(Peru) Real Garcilaso
Ricardo Goulart 23'; Bruno Rodrigo 26'; Júlio Baptista 41'	Report

Estádio Mineirão, Belo Horizonte
Referee: Adrián Vélez (Colombia)

==== Copa Sudamericana ====
===== Inti Gas =====
First stage

August 21, 2014
13:00 UTC−5

Inti Gas (Peru)	0–1	(Venezuela) Caracas
	Report	Cure 82'

Estadio Ciudad de Cumaná, Ayacucho
Referee: Diego Lara (Ecuador)

August 28, 2014
18:00 UTC−4:30

Caracas (Venezuela)	1–0	(Peru) Inti Gas
Quijada 10'	Report

Estadio Olímpico de la UCV, Caracas
Referee: Luis Sánchez (Colombia)

===== Alianza Lima =====
First stage

August 21, 2014
17:30 UTC−5

Barcelona (Ecuador)	3–0	(Peru) Alianza Lima
Penilla 31'; Velasco 66'; Blanco 90+1'	Report

Estadio Monumental Isidro Romero Carbo, Guayaquil
Referee: Adrián Vélez (Colombia)

August 27, 2014
21:00 UTC−5

Alianza Lima (Peru)	0–0	(Ecuador) Barcelona
	Report

Estadio Alejandro Villanueva, Lima
Referee: Imer Machado (Colombia)

===== UTC =====
First stage

August 20, 2014
16:00 UTC−5

UTC (Peru)	0–0	(Colombia) Deportivo Cali
	Report

Estadio Héroes de San Ramón, Cajamarca
Referee: Julio Bascuñán (Chile)

August 28, 2014
20:00 UTC−5

Deportivo Cali (Colombia)	3–0	(Peru) UTC
Nasuti 4', 68'; Rivas 24'	Report

Estadio Olímpico Pascual Guerrero, Cali
Referee: Jesús Valenzuela (Venezuela)

===== UCV =====
First stage

August 21, 2014
19:50 UTC−5

Millonarios (Colombia)	1–2	(Peru) Universidad César Vallejo
Uribe 44'	Report	Pando 2', 39'

Estadio El Campín, Bogotá
Referee: José Argote (Venezuela)

August 28, 2014
17:30 UTC−5

Universidad César Vallejo (Peru)	2–2	(Colombia) Millonarios
Quinteros 2', 18'	Report	Uribe 34'; Agudelo 66'

Estadio Mansiche, Trujillo
Referee: Carlos Ulloa (Chile)

Second stage

September 17, 2014
18:00 UTC−4

Universitario (Bolivia)	2–2	(Peru) Universidad César Vallejo
Ballivián 71'; Camacho 90+4'	Report	Pando 50'; D. Chávez 56'

Estadio Olímpico Patria, Sucre
Attendance: 16,000
Referee: Péricles Cortez (Brazil)

September 23, 2014
17:00 UTC−5

Universidad César Vallejo (Peru)	3–0	(Bolivia) Universitario
Millán 54'; Pando 61'; D. Chávez 82'	Report

Estadio Mansiche, Trujillo
Referee: Adrián Vélez (Colombia)

Round of 16

October 1, 2014
19:30 UTC−3

Bahia (Brazil)	2–0	(Peru) Universidad César Vallejo
Titi 64'; William Barbio 79'	Report

Itaipava Arena Fonte Nova, Salvador
Referee: Carlos Amarilla (Paraguay)

October 15, 2014
20:00 UTC−5

Universidad César Vallejo (Peru)	2–0	(Brazil) Bahia
Quinteros 82'; Chiroque 90'	Report
Penalties
Tejada (penalty scored); D. Chávez (penalty missed); Chiroque (penalty scored); Pando (penalty scored); Millán (penalty scored); Rabanal (penalty missed); Muente (penalty missed); Morales (penalty scored); Cardoza (penalty scored); Libman (penalty scored)	7–6	(penalty scored) Marcos Aurélio; (penalty missed) Lucas Fonseca; (penalty scored) Henrique; (penalty scored) Titi; (penalty scored) Léo Gago; (penalty missed) Uelliton; (penalty missed) Pará; (penalty scored) William Barbio; (penalty scored) Railan; (penalty missed) Marcelo Lomba

Estadio Mansiche, Trujillo
Referee: Carlos Vera (Ecuador)

Quarterfinals

October 29, 2014
20:30 UTC−5

Atlético Nacional (Colombia)	1–0	(Peru) Universidad César Vallejo
Bernal 56'	Report

Estadio Atanasio Girardot, Medellín
Referee: Héber Lopes (Brazil)

November 5, 2014
21:30 UTC−5

Universidad César Vallejo (Peru)	0–1	(Colombia) Atlético Nacional
	Report	Cardona 80'

Estadio Mansiche, Trujillo
Referee: Mauro Vigliano (Argentina)

=== Women's football ===
Team	2014 Copa Libertadores Femenina
Real Maracaná	Group Stage

== Torneo Descentralizado ==
=== Torneo del Inca ===
==== Group Stage ====
Group A

Pos	Team	Pld	W	D	L	GF	GA	GD	Pts	Qualification	ALI	JUA	LEO	CRI	GAR	UCO	INT	SSI
1	Alianza Lima	14	7	6	1	20	8	+12	27	Advance to Final	—	1–1	0–0	1–0	1–0	2–0	4–0	2–0
2	Juan Aurich	14	7	3	4	32	20	+12	24		1–3	—	3–2	5–1	1–0	4–0	3–1	4–0
3	León de Huánuco	14	6	6	2	20	15	+5	24		0–0	1–1	—	1–1	1–1	4–3	3–0	1–0
4	Sporting Cristal	14	5	5	4	26	21	+5	20		2–2	2–0	3–0	—	0–3	5–2	5–1	1–1
5	Real Garcilaso	14	5	4	5	20	15	+5	19		1–0	2–2	1–3	1–0	—	3–0	4–0	1–1
6	Unión Comercio	14	3	6	5	15	25	−10	15		1–1	3–2	0–0	1–1	2–2	—	1–0	1–0
7	Inti Gas	14	3	3	8	17	31	−14	12		1–1	3–2	1–2	1–3	2–0	1–1	—	4–0
8	San Simón	14	2	3	9	10	25	−15	9		1–2	1–3	1–2	2–1	2–1	0–0	2–2	—

Source: ADFP - official fixture

Group B

Pos	Team	Pld	W	D	L	GF	GA	GD	Pts	Qualification	USM	UCV	MEL	UTC	CAI	SHU	UNI	CIE
1	Universidad San Martín	14	8	1	5	26	19	+7	25	Advance to Final	—	2–1	3–1	2–0	1–0	1–0	2–3	2–0
2	Universidad César Vallejo	14	7	3	4	23	15	+8	24		1–4	—	0–1	3–0	1–1	5–0	1–1	1–0
3	Melgar	14	6	4	4	18	11	+7	22		2–1	2–1	—	3–0	1–1	2–0	0–1	3–0
4	UTC	14	5	5	4	14	18	−4	20		3–2	0–2	1–0	—	2–1	2–0	0–0	1–0
5	Los Caimanes	14	4	6	4	16	16	0	18		1–4	2–3	1–0	1–1	—	2–2	1–0	2–1
6	Sport Huancayo	14	4	5	5	16	22	−6	17		3–2	2–2	2–2	1–1	0–0	—	1–0	0–1
7	Universitario	14	3	6	5	12	14	−2	15		1–1	0–1	1–1	1–1	0–0	1–3	—	2–0
8	Cienciano	14	3	2	9	9	19	−10	7 (Note: Cienciano was docked a total of 4 points for an outstanding debt with its players.)	Starts Apertura with -3 points	3–0	0–1	0–0	2–2	0–3	1–2	2–1	—

Source: ADFP - official fixture

==== Final ====
21 May 2014
20:00 UTC-5

Alianza Lima	3–3 (a.e.t.)	Universidad San Martín
Aparicio 85'; Guevgeozián 90+2'; Montes 111'	Report	Perea 16' (pen.); Silva 28'; Ubierna 112'
Penalties
Ibáñez (penalty scored); Aparicio (penalty scored); Ponce (penalty scored); Aguirre (penalty scored); Guevgeozián (penalty scored)	5–3	(penalty scored) Ballón; (penalty scored) Vasquez; (penalty missed) Fernández; (penalty scored) Hinostroza

Miguel Grau, Callao
Attendance: 13,239
Referee: Víctor Hugo Carrillo

=== Torneo Apertura ===
Pos	Team	Pld	W	D	L	GF	GA	GD	Pts	Qualification
1	Juan Aurich	15	9	3	3	34	18	+16	30	Third stage and 2015 Copa Libertadores second stage
2	Melgar	15	6	7	2	23	17	+6	25	
3	Universidad César Vallejo	15	7	3	5	23	16	+7	24	
4	Universitario	15	7	3	5	21	18	+3	24	
5	Inti Gas	15	6	5	4	25	28	−3	23	
6	León de Huánuco	15	6	4	5	18	19	−1	22	
7	Universidad San Martín	15	5	6	4	25	16	+9	21	
8	Unión Comercio	15	6	3	6	17	12	+5	21	
9	Real Garcilaso	15	6	2	7	19	19	0	20	
10	Cienciano	15	6	4	5	20	18	+2	19 (Note: Cienciano were deducted 3 points for finishing last in the 2014 Torneo del Inca)	
11	Alianza Lima	15	4	7	4	16	14	+2	19	
12	UTC	15	4	6	5	15	20	−5	18	
13	Sporting Cristal	15	4	5	6	26	19	+7	17	
14	Sport Huancayo	15	4	3	8	22	34	−12	15	
15	San Simón	15	4	2	9	15	33	−18	14	
16	Los Caimanes	15	3	3	9	13	31	−18	12	

Updated to match(es) played on 4 September 2014. Source: ADFP
Rules for classification: 1) points; 2) goal difference; 3) number of goals scored.

=== Torneo Clausura ===
Pos	Team	Pld	W	D	L	GF	GA	GD	Pts	Qualification
1	Sporting Cristal	15	10	3	2	35	19	+16	33 (Note: Alianza Lima and Sporting Cristal were tied on points for first place. A play-off match was played to determine the winner of the Torneo Clausura as goal difference and number of goals scored is not taken into account to determine the winner of the tournament when tied for first place.)	Third stage and 2015 Copa Libertadores second stage
2	Alianza Lima	15	10	3	2	27	11	+16	33	
3	Unión Comercio	15	9	1	5	24	15	+9	28	
4	Melgar	15	8	3	4	21	16	+5	27	
5	León de Huánuco	15	7	2	6	21	21	0	23	
6	Real Garcilaso	15	5	6	4	20	17	+3	21	
7	Universitario	15	6	3	6	17	17	0	21	
8	Inti Gas	15	5	5	5	21	19	+2	20	
9	Los Caimanes	15	5	5	5	15	18	−3	20	
10	Universidad César Vallejo	15	6	1	8	22	24	−2	19	
11	Juan Aurich	15	5	4	6	13	19	−6	19	
12	Sport Huancayo	15	5	2	8	16	20	−4	17	
13	Cienciano	15	5	2	8	16	24	−8	17	
14	UTC	15	4	3	8	14	22	−8	15	
15	Universidad San Martín	15	4	2	9	21	23	−2	14	
16	San Simón	15	2	3	10	13	31	−18	9	

Updated to match(es) played on 3 December 2014. Source: ADFP
Rules for classification: 1) points; 2) goal difference; 3) number of goals scored.
Notes:

Clausura play-off

December 4, 2014
19:30
Clausura play-off

Alianza Lima	0–1	Sporting Cristal
		57' Blanco

Virgen de Chapi, Arequipa
Attendance: 21,898
Referee: Henry Gambetta

Sporting Cristal won the cup after defeating Alianza Lima.

=== Final ===
December 14, 2014
15:30
First Leg

Juan Aurich	2–2	Sporting Cristal
Ramos 89'; Pacheco 90+3'		26' Ávila; 37' Ávila

Elías Aguirre, Chiclayo
Attendance: 10,002
Referee: Manuel Garay

December 17, 2014
20:00
Second Leg

Sporting Cristal	0–0	Juan Aurich

Nacional, Lima
Attendance: 30,621
Referee: Victor Hugo Carrillo

December 21, 2014
15:00
Third Leg

Sporting Cristal	3–2	Juan Aurich
Ávila 41'; Calcaterra 68'; Chávez 112'		13' Rengifo; 43' Viza

Mansiche, Trujillo
Referee: Miguel Santivañez

Sporting Cristal won the cup after defeating Juan Aurich.

== Segunda División ==
Pos	Team	Pld	W	D	L	GF	GA	GD	Pts	Promotion or relegation
1	Deportivo Municipal	30	18	7	5	49	30	+19	61	2015 Torneo Descentralizado
2	Deportivo Coopsol	30	17	7	6	53	26	+27	58	
3	Carlos A. Mannucci	30	17	5	8	46	32	+14	56 (Note: Pacífico defeated Carlos A. Mannucci by walkover because Mannucci posted political advertisement on their jersey.)	
4	Alianza Universidad	30	15	8	7	51	30	+21	53 (Note: Alianza Universidad defeated Alfonso Ugarte by walkover after Alfonso Ugarte received five red cards. Alfonso Ugarte was docked a total of 4 points for outstanding debts with the SAFAP)	
5	Willy Serrato	30	12	10	8	44	37	+7	46	
6	Unión Huaral	30	11	7	12	38	37	+1	40	
7	Defensor San Alejandro	30	10	9	11	37	37	0	39	
8	Atlético Minero	30	10	9	11	30	40	−10	39	
9	Atlético Torino	30	9	10	11	37	34	+3	37	
10	Alfonso Ugarte	30	11	6	13	36	51	−15	35	
11	Pacífico	30	9	8	13	33	44	−11	35	
12	Sport Boys	30	8	13	9	42	47	−5	33 (Note: Sport Boys was docked a total of 2 points for outstanding debts with the SAFAP)	
13	Sport Victoria	30	7	10	13	32	39	−7	31	
14	Comerciantes Unidos	30	7	9	14	29	36	−7	30	
15	José Gálvez	30	7	10	13	25	39	−14	25 (Note: José Gálvez was docked a total of 6 points for outstanding debts with the SAFAP)	2015 Copa Perú
16	Walter Ormeño	30	4	9	17	22	47	−25	19 (Note: Walter Ormeño was docked a total of 2 points for outstanding debts with the SAFAP)	2015 Copa Perú

Updated to match(es) played on November 29, 2014. Source: ADFP-SD - official site
Rules for classification: 1) points; 2) goal difference; 3) number of goals scored; 4) head-to-head record; 5) drawing of lots
