= 2014 FBC Melgar season =

FBC Melgar
2014 season
- Manager: Juan Reynoso
- Stadium: Monumental Virgen de Chapi
- Torneo Descentralizado: Torneo Apertura: Second (2°); Torneo Clausura: Fourth (4°); Aggregate Table: First (1°); Fourth National (4°)
- Torneo del Inca: Group stage (Third 3° Group B)
- Top goalscorer: League: Bernardo Cuesta (17); All: Bernardo Cuesta (18); Ysrael Zuñiga (14); Minzum Quina (9)
- Biggest win: 3–0 vs UTC Torneo del Inca GB Match 8 (5 April 2014, Home); 3–0 vs Cienciano Torneo del Inca GB Match 13 (10 May 2014, Home); 3–0 vs Los Caimanes Torneo Apertura Match 3 (21 June 2014, Home); 0–3 vs Los Caimanes Torneo Clausura Match 3 (21 September 2014, Away)
- Biggest defeat: 3–1 vs Univ. San Martín Torneo del Inca GB Match 14 (17 May 2014, Away); 3–1 vs Juan Aurich Torneo Apertura Match 11 (9 August 2014, Away); 3–1 vs Sport Huancayo Torneo Clausura Match 14 (22 November 2014, Away)
Home colours	Away colours	Third colours

The 2014 FBC Melgar season were the One-Hundredth (100.º) of the club from its foundation in 1915, Forty-Five (45) participations in the top-flight of Peruvian Primera División (of 98 Editions) with denomination Torneo Descentralizado. In Previous Season the club qualified as 12th Place of the 2013 Torneo Descentralizado.

Melgar were a of sixteen (16) clubs in the Forty-Nineth edition (49.º) Torneo Descentralizado, the competition most important of the Peruvian football. The club played the Peruvian Primera División and the Torneo del Inca.

== Torneo del Inca ==
Group stage (Group B)

Pos	Team	Pld	W	D	L	GF	GA	GD	Pts	Qualification	USM	UCV	MEL	UTC	CAI	SHU	UNI	CIE
1	Universidad San Martín	14	8	1	5	26	19	+7	25	Advance to Final	—	—	3–1	—	—	—	—	—
2	Universidad César Vallejo	14	7	3	4	23	15	+8	24		—	—	0–1	—	—	—	—	—
3	FBC Melgar	14	6	4	4	18	11	+7	22		2–1	2–1	—	3–0	1–1	2–0	0–1	3–0
4	UTC	14	5	5	4	14	18	−4	20		—	—	1–0	—	—	—	—	—
5	Los Caimanes	14	4	6	4	16	16	0	18		—	—	1–0	—	—	—	—	—
6	Sport Huancayo	14	4	5	5	16	22	−6	17		—	—	2–2	—	—	—	—	—
7	Universitario	14	3	6	5	12	14	−2	15		—	—	1–1	—	—	—	—	—
8	Cienciano	14	3	2	9	9	19	−10	7 (Note: Cienciano was docked a total of 4 points for an outstanding debt with its players.)	Starts Apertura with -3 points	—	—	0–0	—	—	—	—	—

Source: ADFP - official fixture

== Torneo Descentralizado ==
=== Torneo Apertura ===
Pos	Team	Pld	W	D	L	GF	GA	GD	Pts
1	Juan Aurich	15	9	3	3	34	18	+16	30
2	Melgar	15	6	7	2	23	17	+6	25
3	Universidad César Vallejo	15	7	3	5	23	16	+7	24

==== Results ====
Home \ Away	ALI	CIE	IGD	JA	LEÓ	MEL	CAI	RGA	SSM	CRI	SHU	UCO	UCV	USM	UTC	UNI
Alianza Lima						1–1										
Cienciano																
Inti Gas																
Juan Aurich						3–1										
León de Huánuco																
Melgar		0–0	2–2		1–1		3–0				2–2		2–1	2–1	2–2	
Los Caimanes																
Real Garcilaso						1–1										
San Simón						1–0										
Sporting Cristal						1–2										
Sport Huancayo																
Unión Comercio						0–2										
Universidad César Vallejo																
Universidad San Martín																
UTC																
Universitario						1–2										

Updated to match(es) played on February 2014. Source: ADFP - official fixture
Legend: Blue = home team win; Yellow = draw; Red = away team win.

=== Torneo Clausura ===
Pos	Team	Pld	W	D	L	GF	GA	GD	Pts
3	Unión Comercio	15	9	1	5	24	15	+9	28
4	Melgar	15	8	3	4	21	16	+5	27
5	León de Huánuco	15	7	2	6	21	21	0	23

==== Results ====
Home \ Away	ALI	CIE	IGD	JA	LEÓ	MEL	CAI	RGA	SSM	CRI	SHU	UCO	UCV	USM	UTC	UNI
Alianza Lima																
Cienciano						0–2										
Inti Gas						2–0										
Juan Aurich																
León de Huánuco						0–1										
Melgar	2–3			1–1				2–2	2–1	1–0		1–0				1–1
Los Caimanes						0–3										
Real Garcilaso																
San Simón																
Sporting Cristal																
Sport Huancayo						3–1										
Unión Comercio																
Universidad César Vallejo						1–2										
Universidad San Martín						0–2										
UTC						2–0										
Universitario																

Updated to match(es) played on February 2014. Source: ADFP - official fixture
Legend: Blue = home team win; Yellow = draw; Red = away team win.

== See also ==
- FBC Melgar
- 2014 Torneo Descentralizado
- 2014 Torneo del Inca
- 2014 Torneo de Promoción y Reservas
