= List of Sport Huancayo seasons =

This is a list of seasons played by Sport Huancayo in Peruvian and South American football, from 2007 to the most recent completed season. Sport Huancayo was founded in February, 2007 as Huancaína Sport Club by the initiative of a beer company led by Raúl Rojas and Édgar Araníbar, which purchased the playing rights of Club Escuela de Fútbol Huancayo, who was at that time playing in the Liga Distrital de El Tambo. In 2008, the club changed its name to Sport Huancayo to better identify themselves with the city of Huancayo.

The club has won the Copa Perú once, has finished the Peruvian Primera División tournament in third place once, and has finished as Copa Bicentenario runner-up once. This list details the club's achievements in all major competitions, and the top scorers for each season (where the information is available). Top scorers in bold were also the top scorers in the Peruvian Primera División that season.

== Key ==
Key to colors and symbols

| 1st or W | Winners |
| 2nd or RU | Runners-up |
| 3rd | Third place |
| Pro. ↑ | Promoted ↑ |
| Rel. ↓ | Relegated ↓ |
| ♦ | League top scorer |

Key to league record

- Season = The year and article of the season
- League = League name
- Pld = Games played
- W = Games won
- L = Games lost
- D = Games drawn
- GF = Goals for
- GA = Goals against
- GD = Goal difference
- Pts = Points
- Pos = Regular season position
- Play-offs = Play-offs position

Key to national cups record

- — = Competition not held or canceled
- DNE = Did not enter
- DNQ = Did not qualify
- QR = Qualifying round
- PR = Preliminary round
- GS = Group stage
- R1 = First round
- R2 = Second round
- R3 = Third round
- R4 = Fourth round
- R5 = Fifth round
- Ro16 = Round of 16
- QF = Quarter-finals
- SF = Semi-finals
- F = Final
- RU = Runners-up
- W = Winners

== Seasons ==
| Season | League | | | | | | | | | Position | | National Cups | | Continental / Other | | Tournament Top goalscorer(s) | |
| Season | Div | Competition | Pld | W | D | L | GF | GA | Pts | Pos | Play-offs (Note: Since 1966, play-off games have been used as a tie breaker between teams tie on points for promotion or relegation or as a post-season stage to decide the national championship. Whenever they have occurred, the club's position on that stage is shown in this column.) | National Cups | | Continental / Other | | Name(s) | Goals |
|---|---|---|---|---|---|---|---|---|---|---|---|---|---|---|---|---|---|
| 2007 | 3 | El Tambo District League (Note: the club competed as Huancaína Sport Club this year.) | No information is available regarding the competition. | | | | | | | 1st | — | — | — | DNQ | | — | — |
| 2007 | 3 | Huancayo Provincial League | No information is available regarding the competition. | | | | | | | QF | — | — | — | DNQ | | — | — |
| 2008 | 3 | El Tambo District League | No information is available regarding the competition. | | | | | | | 1st | — | — | — | DNQ | | — | — |
| 2008 | 3 | Huancayo Provincial League | No information is available regarding the competition. | | | | | | | 2nd | — | — | — | DNQ | | — | — |
| 2008 | 3 | Junín Departamental League (Note: Sport Huancayo defeated Minera Corona in a two-leg qualification play-off to reach this stage.) | 6 | 4 | 2 | 0 | 14 | 3 | 14 | 1st | 2nd | — | — | DNQ | | (Peru) Jesús Reyes | 10 |
| 2008 | 3 | Copa Perú - Region V (Note: Region V includes teams from Junín, Pasco and Huánuco region.) | 4 | 2 | 0 | 2 | 8 | 4 | 6 | 1st | — | — | — | DNQ | | (Peru) Jesús Reyes | 10 |
| 2008 | 3 | Copa Perú - National Stage (Note: Sport Huancayo defeated Deportivo Municipal (Acoria) and Sport Huamanga to reach the Final Group Stage.) | 3 | 2 | 0 | 1 | 4 | 1 | 6 | **1st** ↑ | — | — | — | DNQ | | (Peru) Jesús Reyes | 10 |
| 2009 | 1 | Torneo Descentralizado | 44 | 21 | 7 | 16 | 65 | 55 | 70 | 4th | DNQ | — | — | DNQ | | (Peru) Irven Ávila (Paraguay) Blas López | 13 |
| 2010 | 1 | Torneo Descentralizado | 44 | 17 | 8 | 19 | 64 | 60 | 59 | 8th | DNQ | — | — | Copa Sudamericana | R2 | (Peru) Irven Ávila | 17 |
| 2011 | 1 | Torneo Descentralizado | 30 | 15 | 5 | 10 | 49 | 33 | 50 | 3rd | DNQ | Torneo Intermedio | SF | DNQ | | (Peru) Irven Ávila | 14 |
| 2012 | 1 | Torneo Descentralizado | 44 | 18 | 9 | 17 | 52 | 51 | 63 | 6th | DNQ | — | — | Copa Libertadores | R1 | (Peru) Sergio Ibarra | 14 |
| 2013 | 1 | Torneo Descentralizado | 44 | 14 | 14 | 16 | 55 | 62 | 56 | 11th | DNQ | — | — | Copa Sudamericana | R1 | (Peru) Sergio Ibarra | 16 |
| 2014 | 1 | Torneo Apertura | 15 | 4 | 3 | 8 | 22 | 34 | 15 | 14th | W (Note: Sport Huancayo defeated Los Caimanes 1–0 after they tied on points in the aggregate table.) | Torneo del Inca | GS | DNQ | | (Brazil) Kleyr Vieira | 13 |
| 2014 | 1 | Torneo Clausura | 15 | 5 | 2 | 8 | 16 | 20 | 17 | 12th | W | Torneo del Inca | GS | DNQ | | (Brazil) Kleyr Vieira | 13 |
| 2015 | 1 | Torneo Apertura | 16 | 5 | 7 | 4 | 19 | 17 | 22 | 9th | DNQ | Torneo del Inca | GS | DNQ | | (Peru) Antonio Meza-Cuadra | 23 |
| 2015 | 1 | Torneo Clausura | 16 | 8 | 4 | 4 | 28 | 20 | 25 (Note: Sport Huancayo were deducted 3 points by the league.) | 3rd | DNQ | Torneo del Inca | GS | DNQ | | (Peru) Antonio Meza-Cuadra | 23 |
| 2016 | 1 | Torneo Descentralizado | 44 | 16 | 14 | 14 | 52 | 44 | 62 | 7th | DNQ | — | — | Copa Sudamericana | R2 | (Peru) Antonio Meza-Cuadra | 17 |
| 2017 | 1 | Torneo de Verano | 14 | 5 | 3 | 6 | 19 | 23 | 18 | 5th | DNQ | — | — | Copa Sudamericana | R1 | (Peru) Mauricio Montes | 17 |
| 2017 | 1 | Torneo Apertura | 15 | 7 | 5 | 3 | 23 | 16 | 26 | 4th | DNQ | — | — | Copa Sudamericana | R1 | (Peru) Mauricio Montes | 17 |
| 2017 | 1 | Torneo Clausura | 15 | 5 | 5 | 5 | 22 | 22 | 20 | 7th (Note: Sport Huancayo was awarded 2 points for winning the 2017 Torneo de Promoción y Reserva.) | DNQ | — | — | Copa Sudamericana | R1 | (Peru) Mauricio Montes | 17 |
| 2018 | 1 | Torneo de Verano | 14 | 8 | 3 | 3 | 29 | 20 | 27 | 1st | 2nd (Note: Sport Huancayo lost to Sporting Cristal in the Torneo de Verano finals.) | — | — | Copa Sudamericana | R2 | (Paraguay) Carlos Neumann | 27 |
| 2018 | 1 | Torneo Apertura | 15 | 4 | 6 | 5 | 16 | 15 | 18 | 10th | DNQ | — | — | Copa Sudamericana | R2 | (Paraguay) Carlos Neumann | 27 |
| 2018 | 1 | Torneo Clausura | 15 | 3 | 7 | 5 | 19 | 22 | 16 | 15th | DNQ | — | — | Copa Sudamericana | R2 | (Paraguay) Carlos Neumann | 27 |
| 2019 | 1 | Torneo Apertura | 17 | 6 | 6 | 5 | 22 | 23 | 24 | 10th | DNQ | Copa Bicentenario | RU | Copa Sudamericana | R1 | (Paraguay) Carlos Neumann | 14 |
| 2019 | 1 | Torneo Clausura | 17 | 7 | 5 | 5 | 24 | 21 | 26 | 8th | DNQ | Copa Bicentenario | RU | Copa Sudamericana | R1 | (Paraguay) Carlos Neumann | 14 |
| 2020 | 1 | Torneo Apertura | 19 | 10 | 5 | 4 | 23 | 15 | 35 | 2nd | DNQ | Copa Bicentenario | — (Note: The Copa Bicentenario was canceled due to the COVID-19 pandemic.) | Copa Sudamericana | Ro16 | (Peru) Marcio Valverde | 11 |
| 2020 | 1 | Torneo Clausura | 9 | 2 | 3 | 4 | 9 | 15 | 9 | 9th | DNQ | Copa Bicentenario | — | Copa Sudamericana | Ro16 | (Peru) Marcio Valverde | 11 |
| 2021 | 1 | Fase 1 | 9 | 3 | 3 | 3 | 8 | 9 | 12 | 4th | DNQ | Copa Bicentenario | R1 | Copa Sudamericana | GS | — | — |
| 2021 | 1 | Fase 2 | 17 | 3 | 9 | 5 | 18 | 21 | 18 | 13th | DNQ | Copa Bicentenario | R1 | Copa Sudamericana | GS | — | — |
