= 2014 Club Universitario de Deportes season =

Universitario de Deportes
2014 season
- Chairman: Fernando Bravo; Raúl Leguía
- Manager: Ángel Comizzo; Carlos Silvestri; José Guillermo del Solar
- Stadium: Estadio Monumental
- Peruvian Primera División: 7th
- Copa Libertadores: Second stage
- Torneo del Inca: Group stage
Home colours	Away colours

The 2014 season was Universitario de Deportes' 90th season since its founding in 1924. The club played the Torneo Descentralizado and the Copa Libertadores.

== Competitions ==
=== Overall ===
Competition	Started round	Final position / round	First match	Last match
Torneo del Inca	Group stage	Group stage	2 Feb	18 May
Torneo Descentralizado	Matchday 1	7th	15 Feb	30 Nov
Copa Libertadores	Second stage	Second stage	11 Feb	8 Apr

=== Torneo del Inca ===
Group B

Pos	Team	Pld	W	D	L	GF	GA	GD	Pts
6	Sport Huancayo	14	4	5	5	16	22	−6	17
7	Universitario	14	3	6	5	12	14	−2	15
8	Cienciano	14	3	2	9	9	19	−10	7

1	Universitario	0–1	Universidad César Vallejo	Lima
				Stadium: Monumental

2	Los Caimanes	1–0	Universitario	Chiclayo
				Stadium: Elías Aguirre

3	Universitario	1–1	FBC Melgar	Lima
				Stadium: Nacional

4	Cienciano	1–0	Universitario	Cusco
				Stadium: Municipal de Espinar

5	Universitario	1–1	Universidad San Martín	Lima
				Stadium: Monumental

6	UTC	0–0	Universitario	Cajamarca
				Stadium: Héroes de San Ramón

7	Universitario	1–3	Sport Huancayo	Lima
				Stadium: Monumental

8	Universidad César Vallejo	1–1	Universitario	Trujillo
				Stadium: Mansiche

9	Universitario	0–0	Caimanes	Lima
				Stadium: Nacional

10	FBC Melgar	0–1	Universitario	Arequipa
				Stadium: Monumental UNSA

11	Universitario	2–0	Cienciano	Callao
				Stadium: Miguel Grau

12	Universidad San Martín	2–3	Universitario	Callao
				Stadium: Miguel Grau

13	Universitario	1–1	UTC	Lima
				Stadium: Nacional

14	Sport Huancayo	1–0	Universitario	Huancayo
				Stadium: Huancayo

=== Torneo Descentralizado ===
==== Torneo Apertura ====
Pos	Team	Pld	W	D	L	GF	GA	GD	Pts
3	Universidad César Vallejo	15	7	3	5	23	16	+7	24
4	Universitario	15	7	3	5	21	18	+3	24
5	Inti Gas	15	6	5	4	25	28	−3	23

Results

Home \ Away	ALI	CIE	IGD	JA	LEÓ	MEL	CAI	RGA	SSM	CRI	SHU	UCO	UCV	USM	UTC	UNI
Alianza Lima																
Cienciano																1–2
Inti Gas																2–0
Juan Aurich																2–0
León de Huánuco																
Melgar																
Los Caimanes																2–4
Real Garcilaso																
San Simón																
Sporting Cristal																
Sport Huancayo																
Unión Comercio																
Universidad César Vallejo																1–2
Universidad San Martín																3–3
UTC																2–1
Universitario	1–0				1–2	1–2		2–1	1–0	0–0	3–0	0–0				

Updated to match(es) played on February 2014. Source: ADFP - official fixture
Legend: Blue = home team win; Yellow = draw; Red = away team win.

==== Torneo Clausura ====
Pos	Team	Pld	W	D	L	GF	GA	GD	Pts
6	Real Garcilaso	15	5	6	4	20	17	+3	21
7	Universitario	15	6	3	6	17	17	0	21
8	Inti Gas	15	5	5	5	21	19	+2	20

Results

Home \ Away	ALI	CIE	IGD	JA	LEÓ	MEL	CAI	RGA	SSM	CRI	SHU	UCO	UCV	USM	UTC	UNI
Alianza Lima																1–0
Cienciano																
Inti Gas																
Juan Aurich																
León de Huánuco																2–0
Melgar																1–1
Los Caimanes																
Real Garcilaso																2–0
San Simón																1–1
Sporting Cristal																3–0
Sport Huancayo																0–1
Unión Comercio																2–0
Universidad César Vallejo																
Universidad San Martín																
UTC																
Universitario															3–0	

Updated to match(es) played on February 2014. Source: ADFP - official fixture
Legend: Blue = home team win; Yellow = draw; Red = away team win.

=== Copa Libertadores ===
Group stage

Pos	Team	Pld	W	D	L	GF	GA	GD	Pts
1	(Argentina) Vélez Sarsfield	6	5	0	1	9	3	+6	15
2	(Bolivia) The Strongest	6	3	1	2	8	7	+1	10
3	(Brazil) Atlético Paranaense	6	3	0	3	7	7	0	9
4	(Peru) Universitario	6	0	1	5	3	10	−7	1

Match won	Match drawn	Match lost

Beyond his desire and intentions, Universitario fell 1–0 against Vélez Sarfield from Argentina, at the Monumental stadium, the only goal was scored by Héctor Canteros with ten minutes to go in the game.

February 11, 2014	Universitario (Peru)	0–1	(Argentina) Vélez Sarsfield	Estadio Monumental "U", Lima
21:30 UTC−5		Report	Canteros 80'	Referee: Roddy Zambrano (Ecuador)

Universitario lost 1–0 to The Strongest in La Paz. Wayar at 70 minutes scored the decisive goal, only then did the coach Comizzo resolve the entry of Cris Martínez but it was already extemporaneous since the Bolivians had the height as an ally in the final minutes.

February 20, 2014	The Strongest (Bolivia)	1–0	(Peru) Universitario	Estadio Hernando Siles, La Paz
21:15 UTC−4	Wayar 70'	Report		Referee: Julio Quintana (Paraguay)

March 13, 2014	Universitario (Peru)	0–1	(Brazil) Atlético Paranaense	Estadio Monumental "U", Lima
21:30 UTC−5		Report	Duarte 67' (o.g.)	Referee: Imer Machado (Colombia)

March 20, 2014	Atlético Paranaense (Brazil)	3–0	(Peru) Universitario	Estádio Vila Capanema, Curitiba
17:30 UTC−3	Dalton 10' (o.g.); Felipe 61'; Éderson 84'	Report		Referee: Patricio Polic (Chile)

March 27, 2014	Universitario (Peru)	3–3	(Bolivia) The Strongest	Estadio Monumental "U", Lima
21:00 UTC−5	Ruidíaz 28'; C. Gonzáles 37'; Gómez 56' (pen.)	Report	Chávez 32' (o.g.); Cristaldo 65'; Reinoso 89'	Referee: Hernando Buitrago (Colombia)

April 8, 2014	Vélez Sarsfield (Argentina)	1–0	(Peru) Universitario	Estadio José Amalfitani, Buenos Aires
19:45 UTC−3	Nanni 51'	Report		Referee: Carlos Ulloa (Chile)
