= 2014 Torneo del Inca =

Copa Inca
- Season: 2014
- Dates: 14 February 2014 – 21 May 2014
- Champions: Alianza Lima (first title)
- Copa Libertadores: Alianza Lima
- Copa Sudamericana: Universidad San Martín
- Matches: 225
- Top goalscorer: 12 goals: Luis Alberto Perea
- Biggest home win: UCV 5–0 HUA (May 10)
- Biggest away win: UCV 1–4 USM (Feb. 22); CAI 1–4 USM (May 10)
- Highest scoring: CRI 5–2 UCO (Mar. 2); LEO 4–3 UCO (May 18)

The 2014 Torneo del Inca (also known as part of the 2014 Copa Movistar for sponsorship reasons) was the 2nd season of the Peruvian domestic cup. A total of 16 teams were competing in the tournament from the 2014 Torneo Descentralizado. The Torneo del Inca began on February 14 and is ended on May 21.

== Competition modus ==
The teams will be divided in two groups of eight from which the first place teams in each respective group will qualify for a play-off game to decide the champion. The champion will qualify to the 2015 Copa Libertadores as Peru 3 and the runner-up will qualify to the 2015 Copa Sudamericana as Peru 4 as long as they finish in the top eight of the 2014 Torneo Descentralizado season aggregate table. Alianza Lima and Universitario were seeded into groups A and B respectively and the remaining 14 teams were drawn randomly. The venue for the final (also known as Play-off) will be chosen by the ADFP, which is the governing body of professional football in Perú, to be played on neutral ground. The team with the fewest points over all will start the 2014 Torneo Descentralizado with −3 points.

== Teams ==
Locations of the 2014 Primera División teams

Team	City	Stadium	Capacity
Alianza Lima	Lima	Alejandro Villanueva	35,000
Cienciano	Cusco	Garcilaso	40,000
Inti Gas	Ayacucho	Ciudad de Cumaná	15,000
Juan Aurich	Chiclayo	Elías Aguirre	24,500
León de Huánuco	Huánuco	Heraclio Tapia	15,000
Los Caimanes	Puerto Etén	Elías Aguirre	24,500
Melgar	Arequipa	Virgen de Chapi	40,217
Real Garcilaso	Cusco	Garcilaso	40,000
San Simón	Moquegua	25 de Noviembre	21,000
Sport Huancayo	Huancayo	Estadio Huancayo	20,000
Sporting Cristal	Lima	Alberto Gallardo	18,000
Unión Comercio	Nueva Cajamarca	IPD de Moyobamba	5,000
Universidad César Vallejo	Trujillo	Mansiche	25,000
Universidad San Martín	Lima	Alberto Gallardo	18,000
UTC	Cajamarca	Héroes de San Ramón	18,000
Universitario	Lima	Monumental	80,093

=== Personnel and kits ===
Note: Flags indicate national team as has been defined under FIFA eligibility rules. Players may hold more than one non-FIFA nationality.

Team	Manager	Captain	Kit manufacturer	Shirt sponsor
Alianza Lima	(Uruguay) Guillermo Sanguinetti	(Uruguay) Walter Ibáñez	Nike	Cerveza Cristal
Cienciano	(Peru) Martín García	(Peru) Santiago Acasiete	Lotto	Caja Cusco
Inti Gas	(Paraguay) Rolando Chilavert	(Peru) Amilton Prado	Walon	Inti Gas
Juan Aurich	(Peru) Roberto Mosquera	(Paraguay) Edgar Balbuena	Walon	
León de Huánuco	(Peru) Wilmar Valencia	(Peru) Johan Fano	Loma's	CPP
Los Caimanes	(Peru) Teddy Cardama	(Peru) Mario Gómez	Loma's	
Melgar	(Peru) Juan Reynoso	(Peru) Juan Pablo Begazo	Joma	
Real Garcilaso	(Peru) Freddy García	(Peru) Jhoel Herrera	Marathon	I-RUN
San Simón	(Peru) Octavio Vidales	(Peru) Daniel Sanchez	Real	
Sport Huancayo	(Argentina) Daniel Córdoba	(Paraguay) Blas López	Manchete	
Sporting Cristal	(Argentina) Daniel Ahmed	(Peru) Carlos Lobaton	adidas	Cerveza Cristal
Unión Comercio	(Colombia) Walter Aristizábal	(Peru) Wilber Huaynacari	Real	Olva Courier
Universidad César Vallejo	(Peru) Franco Navarro	(Peru) Luis Guadalupe	Walon	Universidad César Vallejo
Universidad San Martín	(Peru) Julio César Uribe	(Peru) Josepmir Ballón	Umbro	Herbalife
UTC	(Argentina) Carlos Galván	(Peru) Raúl Alemán	Convert	Universidad Alas Peruanas
Universitario	(Peru) José del Solar	(Peru) Antonio Gonzales	Umbro	

=== Managerial changes ===
Team	Outgoing manager	Manner of departure	Date of vacancy	Table	Incoming manager	Date of appointment
Pre-season changes
Alianza Lima	Francisco Pizarro	End of contract	30 November 2013	N/A	Guillermo Sanguinetti	23 November 2013
Universidad César Vallejo	Victor Rivera	End of contract	30 November 2013	N/A	Franco Navarro	6 December 2013
Melgar	Franco Navarro	End of contract	1 December 2013	N/A	Juan Reynoso	9 December 2013
León de Huánuco	César Chacón	End of contract	1 December 2013	N/A	Wilmar Valencia	16 December 2013
Unión Comercio	Javier Arce	End of contract	4 December 2013	N/A	Agustín Castillo	19 December 2013
Sporting Cristal	Claudio Vivas	End of contract	1 December 2013	N/A	Daniel Ahmed	26 December 2013
Sport Huancayo	Gonzalo Arguinchona	End of contract	1 December 2013	N/A	Daniel Córdoba	29 December 2013
San Simón	Luis Flores	End of contract	8 December 2013	N/A	Juan Vidales	11 January 2014
Season changes
Universitario	Ángel Comizzo	Resigned	6 March 2014	7th	Carlos Silvestri (interim)	7 March 2014
Universitario	Carlos Silvestri	End of Contract	22 March 2014	7th	José del Solar	22 March 2014
Unión Comercio	Agustín Castillo	Sacked			Walter Aristizábal	
UTC	Rafael Castillo	Sacked	29 April 2014	2nd	Carlos Galván (interim)	29 April 2014
San Simón	Juan Vidales	Sacked	7 May 2014	8th	Octavio Vidales (interim)	7 May 2014
Cienciano	Mario Viera	Sacked	13 May 2014	8th	Martín García (interim)	13 May 2014

== Group stage ==
=== Group A ===
Pos	Team	Pld	W	D	L	GF	GA	GD	Pts	Qualification	ALI	JUA	LEO	CRI	GAR	UCO	INT	SSI
1	Alianza Lima	14	7	6	1	20	8	+12	27	Advance to Final		1–1	0–0	1–0	1–0	2–0	4–0	2–0
2	Juan Aurich	14	7	3	4	32	20	+12	24		1–3		3–2	5–1	1–0	4–0	3–1	4–0
3	León de Huánuco	14	6	6	2	20	15	+5	24		0–0	1–1		1–1	1–1	4–3	3–0	1–0
4	Sporting Cristal	14	5	5	4	26	21	+5	20		2–2	2–0	3–0		0–3	5–2	5–1	1–1
5	Real Garcilaso	14	5	4	5	20	15	+5	19		1–0	2–2	1–3	1–0		3–0	4–0	1–1
6	Unión Comercio	14	3	6	5	15	25	−10	15		1–1	3–2	0–0	1–1	2–2		1–0	1–0
7	Inti Gas	14	3	3	8	17	31	−14	12		1–1	3–2	1–2	1–3	2–0	1–1		4–0
8	San Simón	14	2	3	9	10	25	−15	9		1–2	1–3	1–2	2–1	2–1	0–0	2–2	

Source: ADFP - official fixture
Legend: Blue = home team win; Yellow = draw; Red = away team win.

=== Group B ===
Pos	Team	Pld	W	D	L	GF	GA	GD	Pts	Qualification	USM	UCV	MEL	UTC	CAI	SHU	UNI	CIE
1	Universidad San Martín	14	8	1	5	26	19	+7	25	Advance to Final		2–1	3–1	2–0	1–0	1–0	2–3	2–0
2	Universidad César Vallejo	14	7	3	4	23	15	+8	24		1–4		0–1	3–0	1–1	5–0	1–1	1–0
3	Melgar	14	6	4	4	18	11	+7	22		2–1	2–1		3–0	1–1	2–0	0–1	3–0
4	UTC	14	5	5	4	14	18	−4	20		3–2	0–2	1–0		2–1	2–0	0–0	1–0
5	Los Caimanes	14	4	6	4	16	16	0	18		1–4	2–3	1–0	1–1		2–2	1–0	2–1
6	Sport Huancayo	14	4	5	5	16	22	−6	17		3–2	2–2	2–2	1–1	0–0		1–0	0–1
7	Universitario	14	3	6	5	12	14	−2	15		1–1	0–1	1–1	1–1	0–0	1–3		2–0
8	Cienciano	14	3	2	9	9	19	−10	7 (Note: Cienciano was docked a total of 4 points for an outstanding debt with its players.)	Starts Apertura with -3 points	3–0	0–1	0–0	2–2	0–3	1–2	2–1	

Source: ADFP - official fixture
Legend: Blue = home team win; Yellow = draw; Red = away team win.

== Final ==
21 May 2014
20:00 UTC−05:00

Alianza Lima	3–3 (a.e.t.)	Universidad San Martín
Aparicio 85'; Guevgeozián 90+2'; Montes 111'	Report	Perea 16' (pen.); Silva 28'; Ubierna 112'
Penalties
Ibáñez (penalty scored); Aparicio (penalty scored); Ponce (penalty scored); Aguirre (penalty scored); Guevgeozián (penalty scored)	5–3	(penalty scored) Ballón; (penalty scored) Vasquez; (penalty missed) Fernández; (penalty scored) Hinostroza

Miguel Grau, Callao
Attendance: 13,239
Referee: Víctor Hugo Carrillo

== Top goalscorers ==
As of May 21, 2014

Player	Nationality	Club	Goals
Luis Alberto Perea	COL	Universidad San Martín	12
Germán Pacheco	ARG	Juan Aurich	10
Mauro Guevgeozián	ARM	Alianza Lima	8
Carlos Orejuela	PER	Inti Gas	7
Roberto Jiménez	PER	Los Caimanes	7
Irven Ávila	PER	Sporting Cristal	7
Ysrael Zúñiga	PER	Melgar	6
Carlos Lobatón	PER	Sporting Cristal	6
Johan Fano	PER	León de Huánuco	6
Alfredo Ramúa	PER	Real Garcilaso	5

== See also ==
- 2014 Torneo Descentralizado
- 2014 Torneo de Promoción y Reserva
