= List of Sport Huancayo players =

This article lists footballers who currently are or have previously played for Peruvian football (soccer) team Sport Huancayo.

== List of players ==
Name	Nat	Pos	Huancayo career	Apps	Goals	Refs
Blas López	(Paraguay)	Forward	2009–2015; 2016–2017	237	30	
César Ortíz	(Peru)	Midfielder	2009–2011; 2016–2017	181	15	
Anier Figueroa	(Colombia)	Defender	2011–2016	193	5	
Joel Pinto	(Peru)	Goalkeeper	2012–	251	—	
Cord Cleque	(Peru)	Defender	2013–2018	182	4	
Marcos Lliuya	(Peru)	Midfielder	2015–	250	10	
Víctor Peña	(Peru)	Midfielder	2015–2020	184	15	
Rafael Farfán	(Peru)	Defender	2010–2013	153	15	
Manuel Corrales	(Peru)	Defender	2016–2019	156	16	
Irven Ávila	(Peru)	Forward	2009–2011	116	42	
Angelo Cruzado	(Peru)	Midfielder	2012–2014	109	22	
Carlos Neumann	(Paraguay)	Forward	2017–2020	113	44	
Marcio Valverde	(Peru)	Midfielder	2018–2021	112	20	
Luis Ojeda	(Peru)	Defender	2012–2014	83	0	
Miguel Huertas	(Peru)	Defender	2009–2010	78	11	
César Doy	(Peru)	Defender	2009–2011	78	1	
Ryan Salazar	(Peru)	Midfielder	2012–2013	90	11	
Antonio Meza Cuadra	(Peru)	Forward	2015–2017	76	36	
José Mendoza	(Peru)	Defender	2012–2013	72	3	
Sergio Ibarra	(Argentina)	Forward	2012–2013	73	31	
Carlos Ibarra	(Peru)	Midfielder	2009–2010	69	3	
Luis Hernández	(Peru)	Midfielder	2012–2013	67	4	
Ivan Chumpitaz	(Peru)	Midfielder	2014–2016	65	1	
Ever Chavez	(Peru)	Midfielder	2015–2017	64	8	
Johan Sotil	(Peru)	Forward	2010–2011	64	7	
Fernando Masias	(Peru)	Midfielder	2009–2010; 2013	64	1	
Kleyr Vieira	(Brazil)	Forward	2013–2015	62	20	

== Current squad ==
As of 1 February 2023

Note: Flags indicate national team as defined under FIFA eligibility rules; some limited exceptions apply. Players may hold more than one non-FIFA nationality.

No.	Pos.	Nation	Player
2	DF	PER	Hugo Ángeles
3	DF	PER	Víctor Balta
4	DF	COL	Jimmy Valoyes
5	DF	ARG	Rodrigo Colombo
6	MF	PER	Alfredo Rojas
7	MF	PER	Kevin Ferreyra
8	MF	PER	Alexis Rojas
9	FW	CHI	Carlos Escobar
10	MF	PER	Marcos Lliuya
11	MF	CHI	Carlos Ross
12	GK	PER	Ángel Zamudio
14	FW	COL	Juan Pérez
15	DF	PER	Marco Huamán

No.	Pos.	Nation	Player
16	MF	PER	Jimmy Pérez
17	MF	PER	Leonardo Villa
19	FW	PER	Ronal Huaccha
20	MF	PER	Ray Gómez
21	MF	PER	Luis Benites
22	MF	PER	Ricardo Salcedo
24	DF	PER	Ángel Pérez
25	DF	PER	Felipe Mesones
26	GK	PER	Carlos Torres
31	GK	PER	Joel Pinto (captain)
44	DF	PER	Juan Barreda
86	DF	COL	Donald Millán
