= 2014 Torneo de Promoción y Reservas =

Torneo de Promoción y Reservas
- Season: 2014
- Champions: Torneo del Inca: Universitario; Torneo Descentralizado: Melgar

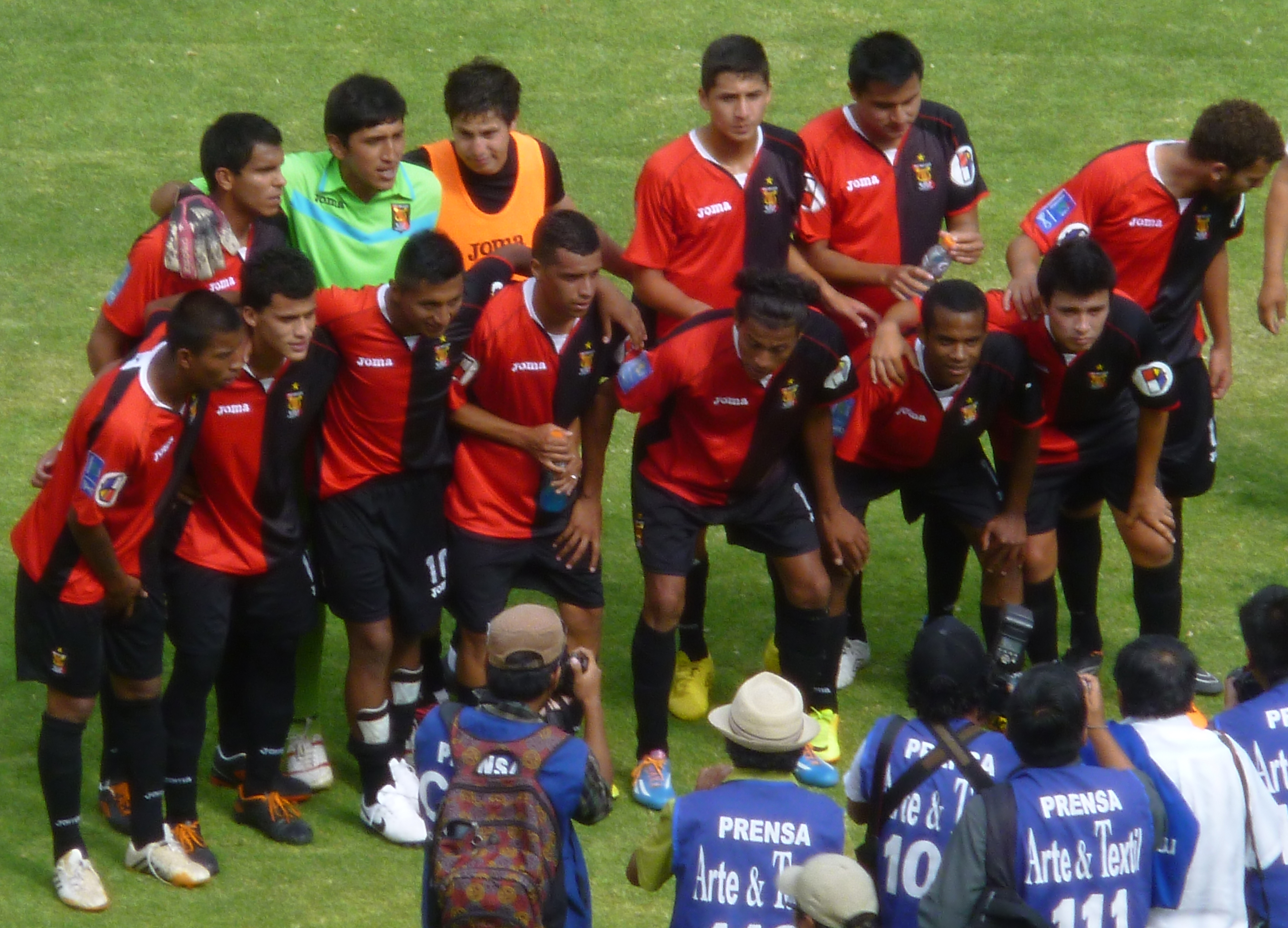
FBC Melgar Reserve Team. 2014 National Champion of the Promotion and Reserve Tournament

The Torneo de Promoción y Reservas is a football tournament in Peru. There are currently 16 clubs in the league. Each team will have a roaster of twelve 21-year-old players, three 19-year-olds as three older reinforcements; whenever they be recorded in the club. The team champion in this tournament will offer two points and the runner-up a point of bonus to the respective regular team in the 2014 Torneo Descentralizado.

== Tournament modus ==
The tournament will be played during both the 2014 Torneo del Inca and 2014 Torneo Descentralizado for a total of 44 games. In the first stage the 16 teams are divided into 2 groups. Both groups play a round-robin home-and-away round for 14 matches. The team ranked first in each group at the end of the round will play the stage final to decide the stage champion and runner-up. The first stage champion and runner-up will receive a two points and one point bonus for the next stage of the tournament. The second stage of the tournament will play a round-robin home-and-away round for a total of 30 matches each. The tournament champion offer two points and the runner-up a point of bonus to the respective regular team in the 2014 Torneo Descentralizado.

== Teams ==
Locations of the 2014 Torneo de Promoción y Reserva teams

Team	City	Stadium	Capacity
Alianza Lima	Lima	Alejandro Villanueva	35,000
Cienciano	Cusco	Garcilaso	40,000
Inti Gas	Ayacucho	Ciudad de Cumaná	15,000
Juan Aurich	Chiclayo	Elías Aguirre	24,500
León de Huánuco	Huánuco	Heraclio Tapia	15,000
Los Caimanes	Chiclayo	Elías Aguirre	24,500
Melgar	Arequipa	Virgen de Chapi	40,217
Real Garcilaso	Cusco	Garcilaso	40,000
San Simón	Moquegua	25 de Noviembre	21,000
Sport Huancayo	Huancayo	Estadio Huancayo	20,000
Sporting Cristal	Lima	Alberto Gallardo	18,000
Unión Comercio	Nueva Cajamarca	IPD de Moyobamba	5,000
Universidad César Vallejo	Trujillo	Mansiche	25,000
Universidad San Martín	Lima	Alberto Gallardo	18,000
UTC	Cajamarca	Héroes de San Ramón	18,000
Universitario	Lima	Monumental	80,093

== Torneo del Inca ==
=== Group A ===
Pos	Team	Pld	W	D	L	GF	GA	GD	Pts	Qualification	CRI	LEO	JA	RGA	IGD	UCO	ALI	SSM
1	Sporting Cristal	14	10	2	2	32	14	+18	32	Final		2–2	2–1	5–2	4–1	4–0	3–1	2–0
2	León de Huánuco	14	7	4	3	27	15	+12	25		1–2		2–1	4–1	2–0	4–1	1–0	1–0
3	Juan Aurich	14	7	1	6	28	18	+10	22		1–2	1–0		6–0	4–0	1–0	2–1	2–3
4	Real Garcilaso	14	6	2	6	18	32	−14	20		1–0	1–1	1–0		1–2	2–1	1–0	6–1
5	Inti Gas	14	5	4	5	18	25	−7	19		1–2	2–1	2–2	1–1		1–0	2–0	3–1
6	Unión Comercio	14	4	4	6	20	25	−5	16		2–2	1–1	4–3	0–1	2–2		2–0	4–3
7	Alianza Lima	14	4	4	6	23	17	+6	16		1–0	1–1	0–1	10–0	1–1	1–1		4–1
8	San Simón	14	3	0	11	18	38	−20	9		0–2	2–6	1–3	1–0	4–0	0–2	1–3	

Source: Adfp.org.pe and ADFP - official fixture
Rules for classification: 1) points; 2) goal difference; 3) number of goals scored

=== Group B ===
==== Standings ====
Pos	Team	Pld	W	D	L	GF	GA	GD	Pts	Qualification	UNI	USM	MEL	CIE	CAI	UCV	UTC	HUA
1	Universitario	14	8	4	2	21	10	+11	28	Final		1–0	3–0	4–0	1–1	3–0	2–0	2–1
2	Universidad San Martín	14	7	4	3	21	9	+12	25		0–0		5–1	0–0	1–0	0–1	2–1	5–1
3	Melgar	14	7	3	4	19	14	+5	24		1–1	0–1		1–0	1–0	2–0	1–1	1–0
4	Cienciano	14	7	3	4	13	16	−3	24		1–1	3–1	2–1		2–1	1–0	1–1	1–0
5	Los Caimanes	14	5	4	5	29	20	+9	19		3–0	1–5	1–1	3–0		4–2	2–0	7–0
6	Universidad César Vallejo	14	4	3	7	20	23	−3	15		1–2	0–0	0–2	0–1	4–4		4–1	4–0
7	UTC	14	3	2	9	11	19	−8	11		0–1	0–1	0–1	3–0	2–1	0–1		1–2
8	Sport Huancayo	14	2	3	9	10	33	−23	9		2–0	0–0	0–6	0–1	1–1	3–3	0–1	

Source: Adfp.org.pe and ADFP - official fixture
Rules for classification: 1) points; 2) goal difference; 3) number of goals scored

=== Final ===
This match was originally scheduled to be played on the same day and place hours before the 2014 Torneo del Inca Final but was postpone to not interfere with two Peru national under-20 football team's friendlies. The champion and runner-up will give its team +2 and +1 point(s) on the tournament's second stage.

29 May 2014
20:00 (UTC−05:00)

Sporting Cristal	0–0 (a.e.t.)	Universitario
Penalties
Villanueva (penalty missed); Ccapaca (penalty scored); Sandoval (penalty scored); Suarez (penalty scored); Cossio (penalty missed); Urquiaga (penalty scored); Bernaola (penalty missed); Silva (penalty scored); Vásquez (penalty missed)	5–6	(penalty missed) Saco-Vértiz; (penalty scored) Camino; (penalty missed) Guarderas; (penalty scored) Nuñez; (penalty scored) Huamantica; (penalty scored) Dávila; (penalty missed) Esparza; (penalty scored) Diez Canseco; (penalty scored) Reátegui

Estadio Nacional, Lima
Attendance: 10,500
Referee: Augusto Menéndez

== Torneo Descentralizado ==
=== Standings ===
Pos	Team	Pld	W	D	L	GF	GA	GD	Pts	Qualification
1	Melgar	30	17	8	5	67	31	+36	59	Bonus +2 to 2014 Torneo Descentralizado
2	Universitario	30	17	6	7	54	30	+24	59	Bonus +1 to 2014 Torneo Descentralizado
3	Sporting Cristal	30	15	10	5	64	32	+32	56	
4	Inti Gas	30	16	5	9	46	34	+12	53	
5	Los Caimanes	30	15	7	8	57	41	+16	52	
6	Unión Comercio	30	13	9	8	46	34	+12	48	
7	Juan Aurich	30	11	8	11	42	34	+8	41	
8	Alianza Lima	30	11	8	11	38	37	+1	41	
9	Universidad César Vallejo	30	11	5	14	55	51	+4	38	
10	Real Garcilaso	30	11	5	14	43	64	−21	38	
11	Universidad San Martín	30	10	7	13	38	40	−2	37	
12	León de Huánuco	30	9	9	12	38	47	−9	36	
13	UTC	30	10	5	15	33	47	−14	35	
14	Sport Huancayo	30	10	4	16	37	60	−23	34	
15	Cienciano	30	7	8	15	33	43	−10	29	
16	San Simón	30	2	6	22	23	89	−66	12	

Updated to match(es) played on 2014. Source: ADFP - official site
Rules for classification: 1) points; 2) goal difference; 3) number of goals scored

=== Results ===
Home \ Away	ALI	CIE	IGD	JA	LEÓ	MEL	CAI	RGA	SSM	CRI	SHU	UCO	UCV	USM	UTC	UNI
Alianza Lima		2–0	3–0	2–2	0–0	3–3	1–1	2–1	3–0	0–2	1–1	0–0	1–0	1–0	2–0	0–3
Cienciano	0–0		2–3	1–0	1–2	1–2	2–2	0–0	5–1	2–0	1–1	3–0	1–0	3–0	1–0	0–1
Inti Gas	1–4	1–1		1–0	3–2	3–3	1–0	3–0	4–0	1–1	2–1	1–2	3–1	0–1	2–0	2–0
Juan Aurich	2–0	5–0	2–0		2–1	1–2	2–3	5–0	1–1	0–2	2–0	1–1	0–0	1–0	3–0	2–2
León de Huánuco	0–0	1–0	0–1	2–1		2–2	2–1	1–0	5–1	0–2	2–0	1–0	2–3	1–1	4–2	1–1
Melgar	4–1	2–1	2–0	0–0	3–0		6–2	1–1	3–0	2–2	4–0	2–0	3–0	5–1	1–0	2–1
Los Caimanes	2–0	2–1	1–0	1–1	2–0	2–1		2–0	6–0	1–3	2–1	3–1	2–3	1–1	3–1	0–0
Real Garcilaso	3–1	2–0	1–2	2–1	4–2	0–3	4–1		2–0	2–2	3–1	2–1	1–6	1–3	2–2	1–4
San Simón	1–2	2–0	0–2	1–2	1–1	1–1	1–3	2–3		1–5	2–2	1–1	1–2	2–1	0–2	0–5
Sporting Cristal	0–1	3–0	0–0	4–0	2–2	2–1	1–4	4–1	5–2		3–0	2–2	2–1	2–2	5–1	1–1
Sport Huancayo	4–3	1–0	1–4	0–1	2–1	0–6	2–2	0–1	5–1	2–1		1–3	5–2	2–1	2–1	2–1
Unión Comercio	2–1	3–1	4–1	2–0	0–0	2–2	0–0	4–1	1–1	1–0	2–0		3–4	2–0	2–0	2–1
Universidad César Vallejo	3–2	1–1	1–1	2–0	4–0	0–1	2–4	4–0	11–0	0–4	0–2	0–2		1–1	2–1	0–0
Universidad San Martín	0–2	3–2	0–2	0–0	4–0	2–0	0–3	1–2	2–0	1–1	5–0	0–0	2–1		2–0	1–2
UTC	1–0	1–1	0–2	0–3	1–1	2–0	2–0	2–2	2–0	1–1	1–0	2–1	5–1	1–0		2–1
Universitario	1–0	2–2	1–0	4–2	3–2	1–0	2–1	4–0	2–0	0–2	2–0	3–2	1–0	2–3	3–0	

Updated to match(es) played on February 2014. Source: ADFP - official fixture
Legend: Blue = home team win; Yellow = draw; Red = away team win.

=== Title playoff ===
December 3, 2014
13:30

Melgar	4–0	Universitario
Zúñiga 6', 65'; Arce 30', 51'

Joel Gutiérrez, Tacna
Referee: Miguel Santiváñez

== See also ==
- 2014 Torneo del Inca
- 2014 Torneo Descentralizado
