= Joel Pinto =

Peruvian footballer (born 1980)

Personal information
- Full name: Joel Ademir Pinto Herrera
- Date of birth: 5 June 1980 (age 46)
- Place of birth: Independencia, Peru
- Height: 1.82 m (6 ft 0 in)
- Position: Goalkeeper

Team information
- Current team: Sport Huancayo
- Number: 88

Youth career
- 1997–1999: Alianza Lima

Senior career*
Years	Team	Apps	(Gls)
2000	Alianza Lima	16	(0)
2001–2002	Coopsol Trujillo	0	(0)
2003	Deportivo Wanka	35	(0)
2004–2005	Sport Boys	81	(0)
2006–2007	Alianza Lima	36	(0)
2004–2010	César Vallejo	89	(0)
2011	Inti Gas	22	(0)
2012–	Sport Huancayo	248	(0)

International career
2012	Peru	0	(0)
- * Club domestic league appearances and goals as of 3 May 2021

Joel Ademir Pinto Herrera (born 5 June 1980) is a Peruvian footballer who plays as a goalkeeper for Sport Huancayo in the Peruvian Liga 1.

== Club career ==
Joel Pinto was born in Independencia. He began his career with Alianza Lima, joining the club at the age of 17. He made his league debut in Torneo Descentralizado in the final round of the 2000 season.

He then joined Coopsol Trujillo in 2001. In his time there he competed with Jaime Muro and Pablo Pérez to be the first choice keeper.

On 7 March 2024, Pinto started for Sport Huancayo in a 2–0 loss to César Vallejo in the 2024 Copa Sudamericana first stage, becoming, at the age of 43 years and 279 days, the oldest-ever player in the history of the Copa Sudamericana, surpassing Uruguayan Richard Pellejero's record.

== International career ==
Pinto was called up to Peru's national team by Sergio Markarián on September 27, 2012 ahead of their game against Bolivia in La Paz for the 2014 FIFA World Cup qualification campaign. However, Pinto only served as a substitute choice as José Carvallo was picked ahead of him as the starting goalkeeper.

== Honours ==
Alianza Lima

- Torneo Apertura: 2006
- Torneo Descentralizado: 2006
