= 2014 Torneo Descentralizado =

Torneo Descentralizado
- Season: 2014
- Dates: 7 June 2014 – 21 December 2014
- Champions: Sporting Cristal
- Relegated: Los Caimanes; San Simón
- Copa Libertadores: Alianza Lima; Juan Aurich; Sporting Cristal
- Copa Sudamericana: Melgar; Unión Comercio; Universitario; León de Huánuco
- Matches: 485
- Top goalscorer: Santiago Silva (23 goals)
- Highest attendance: 30,584; Melgar 1–1 Universitario (18 Nov. 2014)
- Lowest attendance: 46; Los Caimanes 1–0 Unión Comercio (8 Sept. 2014)
- Total attendance: 1,281,392
- Average attendance: 2,642

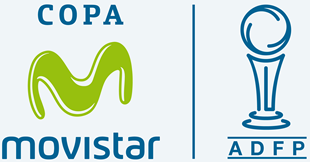
Tournament logo, featuring sponsor Movistar

The 2014 Torneo Descentralizado de Fútbol Profesional (known as the 2014 Copa Movistar for sponsorship reasons) was the 98th season of the highest division of Peruvian football. A total of 16 teams competed in the tournament. The Torneo Descentralizado began on June 7 and ended on December 21 2014.

== Tournament modus ==
The season was divided into three stages. The first two stages were two smaller Apertura and Clausura tournaments of 15 games each. Each team played other teams once during the Apertura tournament and during the Clausura tournament in a reversed order for a total of 30 matches each. In the third stage the championship was contested in a two-legged Play-off. The two teams ranked first at the end of the Apertura and Clausura tournaments moved on to the next round as long as they finished within the top eight teams in the aggregate table. The Play-off finalists qualified for the Copa Libertadores second stage. The remaining international competition berths were determined by the season aggregate table. Bonus points were awarded to two teams based on the performance of their reserve teams in the 2014 Torneo de Promoción y Reserva at the end of the tournament. The two teams with the fewest points in the aggregate table at the end of the tournament was relegated.

== Teams ==
A total of 16 teams competed in the championship, including 14 sides from the 2013 season, the 2013 Peruvian Segunda División champion, and the 2013 Copa Perú champion.

Pacífico and José Gálvez were relegated to 2014 Peruvian Segunda División the previous season: Pacífico immediately returned to the Peruvian Segunda Division after being promoted the previous year. José Gálvez was relegated for the sixth time after a brief two-year tenure in the top division thus becoming the Peruvian team with the most promotions and relegations in history.

The relegated teams were replaced by Los Caimanes and San Simón from the Peruvian Segunda División and Copa Perú respectively who both make their debut in the top flight of Peruvian football. Los Caimanes won the Segunda División by a three-point margin after a short two-year tenure in it. San Simón reached the top division by defeating Unión Huaral in the Copa Perú final.

=== Team changes ===
Promoted from 2013 Segunda División	Promoted from 2013 Copa Perú	Relegated from 2013 Primera División
▲ Los Caimanes (1st)	▲ San Simón (1st)	▼ Pacífico (15th) ▼ José Gálvez (16th)

=== Stadia locations ===
Locations of the 2014 Primera División teams

Team	City	Stadium	Capacity
Alianza Lima	Lima	Alejandro Villanueva	35,000
Cienciano	Cusco	Garcilaso	40,000
Inti Gas	Ayacucho	Ciudad de Cumaná	15,000
Juan Aurich	Chiclayo	Elías Aguirre	24,500
León de Huánuco	Huánuco	Heraclio Tapia	15,000
Los Caimanes	Chiclayo	Elías Aguirre	24,500
Melgar	Arequipa	Virgen de Chapi	40,217
Real Garcilaso	Cusco	Garcilaso	40,000
San Simón	Moquegua	25 de Noviembre	21,000
Sport Huancayo	Huancayo	Estadio Huancayo	20,000
Sporting Cristal	Lima	Alberto Gallardo	18,000
Unión Comercio	Nueva Cajamarca	IPD de Moyobamba	5,000
Universidad César Vallejo	Trujillo	Mansiche	25,000
Universidad San Martín	Lima	Alberto Gallardo	18,000
UTC	Cajamarca	Héroes de San Ramón	18,000
Universitario	Lima	Monumental	80,093

== Torneo Apertura ==
=== Standings ===
Pos	Team	Pld	W	D	L	GF	GA	GD	Pts	Qualification
1	Juan Aurich	15	9	3	3	34	18	+16	30	Third stage and 2015 Copa Libertadores second stage
2	Melgar	15	6	7	2	23	17	+6	25	
3	Universidad César Vallejo	15	7	3	5	23	16	+7	24	
4	Universitario	15	7	3	5	21	18	+3	24	
5	Inti Gas	15	6	5	4	25	28	−3	23	
6	León de Huánuco	15	6	4	5	18	19	−1	22	
7	Universidad San Martín	15	5	6	4	25	16	+9	21	
8	Unión Comercio	15	6	3	6	17	12	+5	21	
9	Real Garcilaso	15	6	2	7	19	19	0	20	
10	Cienciano	15	6	4	5	20	18	+2	19 (Note: Cienciano were deducted 3 points for finishing last in the 2014 Torneo del Inca)	
11	Alianza Lima	15	4	7	4	16	14	+2	19	
12	UTC	15	4	6	5	15	20	−5	18	
13	Sporting Cristal	15	4	5	6	26	19	+7	17	
14	Sport Huancayo	15	4	3	8	22	34	−12	15	
15	San Simón	15	4	2	9	15	33	−18	14	
16	Los Caimanes	15	3	3	9	13	31	−18	12	

Updated to match(es) played on 4 September 2014. Source: ADFP
Rules for classification: 1) points; 2) goal difference; 3) number of goals scored.

=== Results ===
Home \ Away	ALI	CIE	IGD	JA	LEÓ	MEL	CAI	RGA	SSM	CRI	SHU	UCO	UCV	USM	UTC	UNI
Alianza Lima				0–0		1–1		2–0		2–1	4–3	2–2	0–0			
Cienciano	2–1			1–1				2–0		1–1		2–1	2–0			1–2
Inti Gas	1–1	3–1					2–1		3–2				3–3	2–4	1–1	2–0
Juan Aurich			4–1		2–1	3–1			2–1	3–4	6–0	2–1				2–0
León de Huánuco	1–0	2–2	1–1				1–0		4–0					1–1	1–0	
Melgar		0–0	2–2		1–1		3–0				2–2		2–1	2–1	2–2	
Los Caimanes	0–0	2–1		0–4				0–1					1–0		0–0	2–4
Real Garcilaso			3–0	2–2	3–1	1–1			4–1	2–1	1–2	1–0				
San Simón	1–0	0–2				1–0	2–4					0–1	2–1	0–0	2–1	
Sporting Cristal			3–0		4–0	1–2	1–1		6–0		1–2			0–0		
Sport Huancayo		3–1	1–3		0–1		5–1		1–1					2–4	1–1	
Unión Comercio			0–1		1–0	0–2	4–0			2–0	3–0			1–0		
Universidad César Vallejo				2–0	3–1			2–0		3–2	2–0	1–0			3–0	1–2
Universidad San Martín	1–1	0–1		1–2			3–1	2–0					1–1		4–0	3–3
UTC	0–2	2–1		3–1				1–0		1–1		1–1				2–1
Universitario	1–0				1–2	1–2		2–1	1–0	0–0	3–0	0–0				

Updated to match(es) played on February 2014. Source: ADFP - official fixture
Legend: Blue = home team win; Yellow = draw; Red = away team win.

== Torneo Clausura ==
=== Standings ===
Pos	Team	Pld	W	D	L	GF	GA	GD	Pts	Qualification
1	Sporting Cristal	15	10	3	2	35	19	+16	33 (Note: Alianza Lima and Sporting Cristal were tied on points for first place. A play-off match was played to determine the winner of the Torneo Clausura as goal difference and number of goals scored is not taken into account to determine the winner of the tournament when tied for first place.)	Third stage and 2015 Copa Libertadores second stage
2	Alianza Lima	15	10	3	2	27	11	+16	33	
3	Unión Comercio	15	9	1	5	24	15	+9	28	
4	Melgar	15	8	3	4	21	16	+5	27	
5	León de Huánuco	15	7	2	6	21	21	0	23	
6	Real Garcilaso	15	5	6	4	20	17	+3	21	
7	Universitario	15	6	3	6	17	17	0	21	
8	Inti Gas	15	5	5	5	21	19	+2	20	
9	Los Caimanes	15	5	5	5	15	18	−3	20	
10	Universidad César Vallejo	15	6	1	8	22	24	−2	19	
11	Juan Aurich	15	5	4	6	13	19	−6	19	
12	Sport Huancayo	15	5	2	8	16	20	−4	17	
13	Cienciano	15	5	2	8	16	24	−8	17	
14	UTC	15	4	3	8	14	22	−8	15	
15	Universidad San Martín	15	4	2	9	21	23	−2	14	
16	San Simón	15	2	3	10	13	31	−18	9	

Updated to match(es) played on 3 December 2014. Source: ADFP
Rules for classification: 1) points; 2) goal difference; 3) number of goals scored.

=== Clausura play-off ===
Because Alianza Lima and Sporting Cristal tied with 33 points a title play-off on neutral ground was played as the tournament rules specify.

December 4, 2014
19:30
Clausura play-off

Alianza Lima	0–1	Sporting Cristal
		57' Blanco

Virgen de Chapi, Arequipa
Attendance: 21,898
Referee: Henry Gambetta

=== Results ===
Home \ Away	ALI	CIE	IGD	JA	LEÓ	MEL	CAI	RGA	SSM	CRI	SHU	UCO	UCV	USM	UTC	UNI
Alianza Lima		5–0	2–1		2–0		3–1		2–0					2–1	2–0	1–0
Cienciano			0–0		4–2	0–2	0–1		2–0		2–0			3–2	1–1	
Inti Gas				3–1	5–2	2–0		2–1	3–2	3–3	1–1	1–2				
Juan Aurich	0–0	1–0					0–0	1–0					1–2	1–1	2–0	
León de Huánuco				3–0		0–1		1–1		1–3	1–0	2–0	1–0			2–0
Melgar	2–3			1–1				2–2	2–1	1–0		1–0				1–1
Los Caimanes			0–0		3–2	0–3			0–2	1–1	0–0	1–0		4–1		
Real Garcilaso	0–0	0–2					2–0						2–1	1–0	3–0	2–0
San Simón			1–0	1–2	2–2			2–2		2–3	0–1					1–1
Sporting Cristal	3–2	2–0		4–1				1–1				2–3	4–1		3–2	3–0
Sport Huancayo	0–1			0–1		3–1		3–1		1–2		2–1	3–1			0–1
Unión Comercio	1–0	3–0		1–0				2–2	3–1				2–1		3–0	2–0
Universidad César Vallejo	2–2	3–2	3–0			1–2	2–3		2–0					1–0		
Universidad San Martín			2–1		0–1	0–2			6–0	0–1	4–1	2–1				
UTC			0–1		0–1	2–0	1–1		3–0		3–1		1–0	1–1		
Universitario		2–0	1–1	3–1			1–0						1–2	3–1	3–0	

Updated to match(es) played on February 2014. Source: ADFP - official fixture
Legend: Blue = home team win; Yellow = draw; Red = away team win.

== Play-offs ==
The Third Stage were the finals (also known as the Play-off) of the 2014 season between the winners of the Clausura and Apertura tournaments. The team with the most points on the aggregate table chose which leg they play as the home team.

December 14, 2014
15:30
First Leg

Juan Aurich	2–2	Sporting Cristal
Ramos 89'; Pacheco 90+3'		26' Ávila; 37' Ávila

Elías Aguirre, Chiclayo
Attendance: 10,002
Referee: Manuel Garay

December 17, 2014
20:00
Second Leg

Sporting Cristal	0–0	Juan Aurich

Nacional, Lima
Attendance: 30,621
Referee: Victor Hugo Carrillo

December 21, 2014
15:00
Third Leg

Sporting Cristal	3–2	Juan Aurich
Ávila 41'; Calcaterra 68'; Chávez 112'		13' Rengifo; 43' Viza

Mansiche, Trujillo
Referee: Miguel Santivañez

== Aggregate table ==
The aggregate table determined the four teams who qualified to the 2015 Copa Sudamericana, one team to the 2015 Copa Libertadores if necessary, and the two teams to be relegated to the Segunda División. The aggregate table consisted of the points earned in the Apertura and Clausura stages.

Pos	Team	Pld	W	D	L	GF	GA	GD	Pts	Qualification or relegation
1	Melgar	30	14	10	6	44	33	+11	54 (Note: Awarded 2 points as 2014 Torneo de Promoción y Reserva champion)	Qualification to the Copa Sudamericana first stage
2	Alianza Lima	30	14	10	6	43	25	+18	52	Qualification to the Copa Libertadores first stage (Note: Qualified as 2014 Torneo del Inca winner)
3	Sporting Cristal (C)	30	14	8	8	61	38	+23	50	Qualification to the Copa Libertadores second stage (Note: Qualified as Torneo Apertura or Torneo Clausura winners)
4	Unión Comercio	30	15	4	11	41	27	+14	49	Qualification to the Copa Sudamericana first stage
5	Juan Aurich	30	14	7	9	47	37	+10	49	Qualification to the Copa Libertadores second stage
6	Universitario	30	13	6	11	38	35	+3	46 (Note: Awarded 1 point as 2014 Torneo de Promoción y Reserva runner-up)	Qualification to the Copa Sudamericana first stage
7	León de Huánuco	30	13	6	11	39	40	−1	45	Qualification to the Copa Sudamericana first stage
8	Universidad César Vallejo	30	13	4	13	45	40	+5	43	
9	Inti Gas	30	11	10	9	46	47	−1	43	
10	Real Garcilaso	30	11	8	11	39	36	+3	41	
11	Cienciano	30	11	6	13	36	42	−6	39	
12	Universidad San Martín	30	9	8	13	21	23	−2	35	
13	UTC	30	8	9	13	29	42	−13	33	
14	Sport Huancayo	30	9	5	16	38	54	−16	32 (Note: Sport Huancayo and Los Caimanes are tied on points for fourteenth and fifteenth place. A play-off match is required to determine the second relegated team as goal difference and number of goals scored are not taken into account to determine the last two positions for relegation when tied on points.)	
15	Los Caimanes (R)	30	8	8	14	28	49	−21	32	Relegation to 2015 Segunda División
16	San Simón (R)	30	6	5	19	28	64	−36	23	Relegation to 2015 Segunda División

Updated to match(es) played on 3 December 2014. Source: ADFP
Rules for classification: 1) points; 2) goal difference; 3) number of goals scored.
(C) Champions; (R) Relegated

== Relegation play-off ==
Because Sport Huancayo and Los Caimanes tied with 32 points a relegation play-off on neutral ground will be played as the tournament rules specify.

December 4, 2014
15:00
Relegation play-off

Sport Huancayo	1–0	Los Caimanes
Chirinos 118'

Julio Lores Colán, Huaral
Attendance: 1,449
Referee: Luis Seminario

== See also ==
- 2014 Torneo del Inca
- 2014 Torneo de Promoción y Reserva
- 2014 in Peruvian football
