= Kleyr =

Brazilian footballer

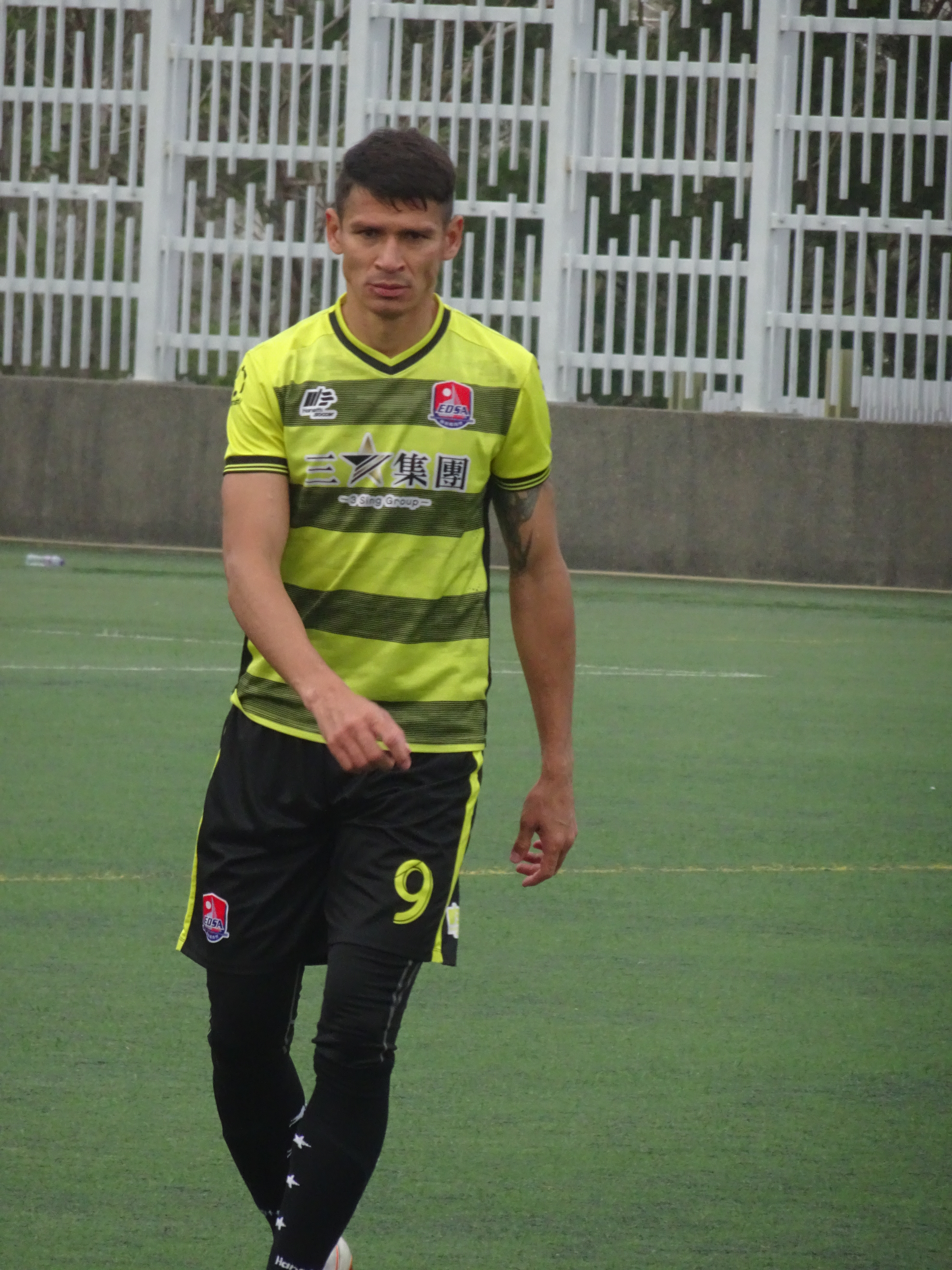

Personal information
- Full name: Kleyr Vieira dos Santos
- Date of birth: September 14, 1980 (age 46)
- Place of birth: Rio Branco, Brazil
- Height: 6 ft 2 in (1.88 m)
- Position: Striker

Team information
- Current team: Eastern District
- Number: 9

Senior career*
Years	Team	Apps	(Gls)
1997–1998	ADESG	40	(18)
1998	Matsubara	13	(12)
1999–2000	Corinthians	10	(0)
1999–2000	→ Osasco (loan)	29	(17)
2000	→ São José (loan)	8	(3)
2000	Mauaense		
2000–2001	Barueri	26	(4)
2001	Roma	10	(1)
2001–2004	Goiás	5	(1)
2003	→ Vila Nova (loan)	3	(0)
2003	→ Grêmio Inhumense (loan)	7	(1)
2003–2004	→ Varzim (loan)	8	(0)
2004	Avaí	0	(0)
2004	Portuguesa	5	(2)
2004–2005	Ponte Preta	20	(2)
2005	Botafogo-SP	2	(0)
2005–2006	Rio Branco-SP	23	(10)
2006	Juventus-SP	9	(2)
2006	→ Anapolina (loan)	8	(1)
2007–2008	FC Vilnius	19	(11)
2007–2008	→ Gloria Buzău (loan)	8	(1)
2008	→ ŁKS Łódź (loan)	4	(0)
2008	→ Hapoel Kfar Saba (loan)	2	(0)
2009–2010	Gama	21	(9)
2010	Brasil de Pelotas	4	(2)
2010	Santa Cruz	0	(0)
2011	Funorte	2	(0)
2011	Araguaína	3	(0)
2011–2012	Plácido de Castro	2	(2)
2012	URT	12	(10)
2013	Rio Branco-SP	6	(0)
2013	→ Uberaba (loan)	6	(2)
2013–2015	Sport Huancayo	60	(20)
2015	Olmedo	4	(0)
2016	Al-Faisaly	20	(17)
2018	Eastern District	15	(11)
2019	CE Jenlai	2	(1)
2019	Atletiko Tera Cora	3	(2)
- * Club domestic league appearances and goals as of 10 March 2019

Kleyr Vieira dos Santos (born 14 September 1980 in Rio Branco), simply Kleyr, is a Brazilian professional footballer who plays Eastern District as a striker.
