= Mauro Guevgeozián =

Uruguayan footballer (born 1986)

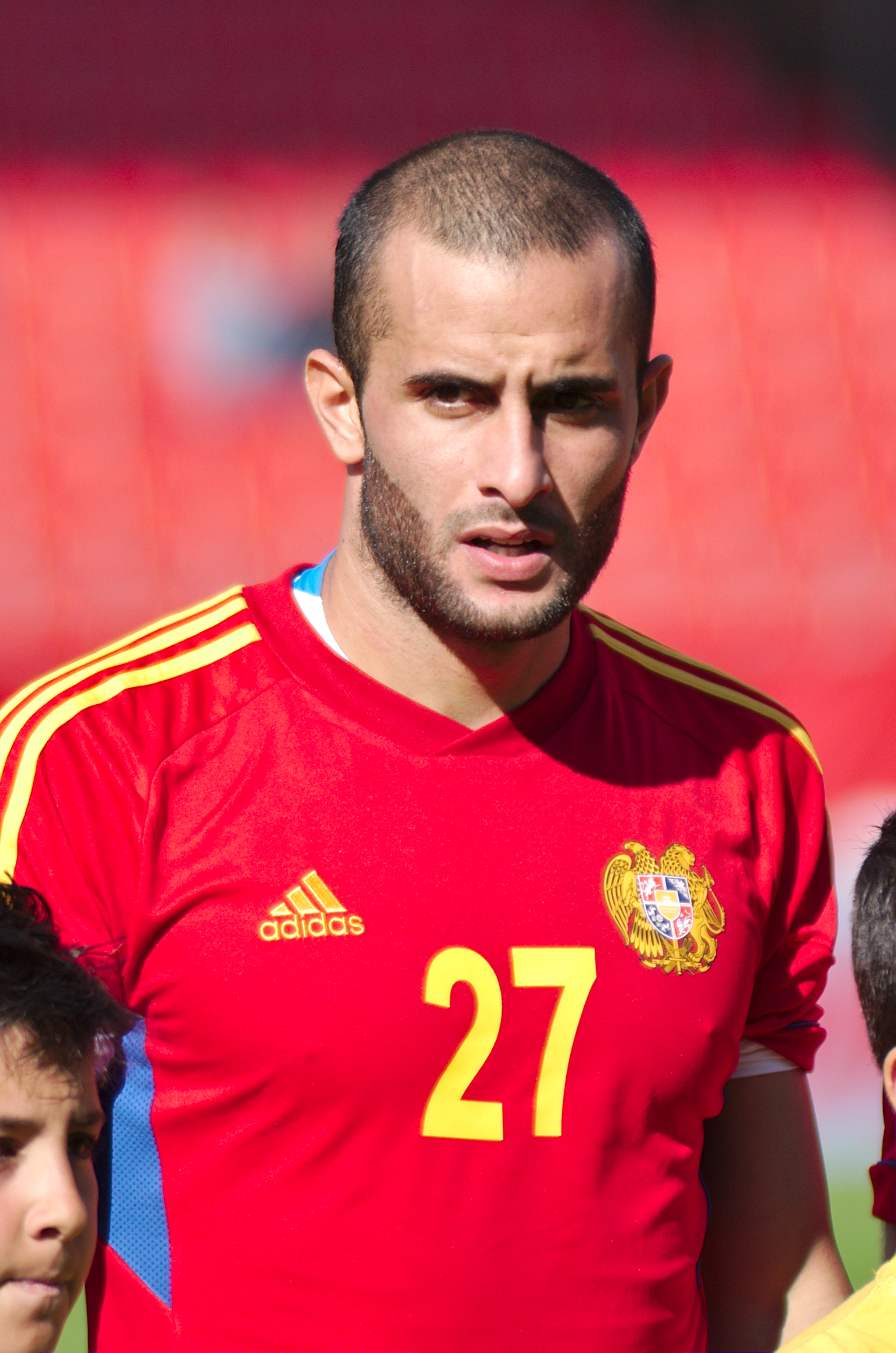
- Guevgeozián representing Armenia in 2014

Personal information
- Full name: Mauro Guevgeozián Crespo
- Date of birth: 10 May 1986 (age 40)
- Place of birth: Montevideo, Uruguay
- Height: 1.84 m (6 ft 0 in)
- Position: Forward

Team information
- Current team: La Luz FC

Senior career*
Years	Team	Apps	(Gls)
2006–2015	Fénix	58	(37)
2007	→ Pyunik Yerevan (loan)	1	(0)
2008–2009	→ Cerrito (loan)	18	(12)
2009–2010	→ Everton (loan)	43	(15)
2011	→ Peñarol (loan)	2	(0)
2013	→ Libertad (loan)	8	(0)
2013–2015	→ Alianza Lima (loan)	56	(19)
2016–2017	Atlético Bucaramanga	23	(11)
2017	Temperley	16	(7)
2017	Newell's Old Boys	8	(1)
2018	Belgrano	11	(2)
2018–2019	Gimnasia LP	9	(1)
2019	Temperley	15	(4)
2020	UTC Cajamarca	25	(14)
2021–2022	Carlos A. Mannucci	14	(3)
2022	→ Sport Boys (loan)	20	(7)
2023	Fénix	6	(0)
2024–	La Luz FC	3	(0)

International career
2014	Armenia	2	(0)
- * Club domestic league appearances and goals as of 26 April 2024

Mauro Guevgeozián Crespo (Armenian: Մաուրո Գևգեոզյան, born 10 May 1986) is a footballer who plays for La Luz FC. Born in Uruguay, he has represented the Armenia national football team.

== Club career ==
Born in Montevideo, Guevgeozián began his career in CA Fénix Montevideo where he became Cerrito scorer and the club became second division Uruguayan Segunda División Clausura champion. After a brief stay in Armenian football club Pyunik Yerevan, during which time the club won the 2007 Armenian Premier League, Guevgeozián returned to Fénix in 2008, where he established himself as a top goalscorer in the second division, which led to his arrival at Everton de Viña del Mar of Chile for the closing of the 2009 Chilean Primera División season tournament. Despite injury, he managed to qualify for the playoffs. In 2010, Guevgeozián was a key goalscorer, but he would go after he descended. He never committed to the team.

In 2011, he joined CA Peñarol Montevideo, with which won the vicechampionship in the 2011–12 Uruguayan Primera División season. Guevgeozián was the tenth top goalscorer with 7 goals. Despite that, he received very few minutes on court for this team. So, he again returned to Fénix in 2012 and again became an important scorer of the team, including scoring 3 goals in 2 games against Peñarol.

In January 2013, he was transferred to Club Libertad of Paraguay. Guevgeozián made his debut on 11 February 2013 in a draw match with Guaraní in the first round of the Paraguayan Primera División.

In 2023, Guevgeozián returned to Uruguay and joined Fénix. The next year, he switched to La Luz FC in the second division.

== International career ==
Speculation that Guevgeozián would join the Armenia national team began in November 2012. Head coach Vardan Minasyan said during a television interview that he would invite him and Guevgeozián himself said he was pleasantly surprised and that it would be a great joy for him and his family if he were to play for the Armenian national football squad. He had not been contacted at the time, however.

Mauro Guevgeozián was supposed to join the Armenia national team and debut in a match against Luxembourg on 5 February 2013. However, due to a disagreement between Guevgeozián and the Football Federation of Armenia over the travel class of his ticket, Mauro did not debut in the intended match.

Mauro would make his debut for Armenia on the friendly matches against Germany and Algeria, the week before the 2014 FIFA World Cup.

In September 2017, he stated that he represented the Armenia national team as a "guest", clarifying he is not naturalized Armenian and keeps the Uruguayan nationality.

== Personal life ==
Guevgeozián was born to Armenian parents in Uruguay. Although Peruvian fans nicknamed him differently, he is known as El Armenio among his teammates and at home. Guevgeozián is personally proud of his nickname.

== Honours ==
=== Club ===
Pyunik Yerevan

- Armenian Premier League: 2007

Peñarol

- Copa Libertadores runner-up: 2011

Alianza Lima

- Copa Inca: 2014
