= Estadio Joel Gutiérrez =

Stadium in Peru

Coordinates: 18.0526°S 70.2463°W

- Interactive map of Estadio Joel Gutiérrez
- Location: Tacna, Peru
- Capacity: 21,000

Construction
- Opened: 30 July 1995

Tenants
- Alfonso Ugarte (Tacna)

The Estadio Joel Gutiérrez is an association football (soccer) stadium in Tacna, Peru. It has a capacity of 21,000. The venue opened on 30 July 1995. Alfonso Ugarte (Tacna) are the tenants of the stadium.
