= Juan Pablo Begazo =

Peruvian footballer (born 1988)

Personal information
- Full name: Juan Pablo Begazo Valvidia
- Date of birth: 18 May 1988 (age 38)
- Place of birth: Camaná, Peru
- Height: 1.85 m (6 ft 1 in)
- Position: Goalkeeper

Team information
- Current team: UT Cajamarca
- Number: 1

Senior career*
Years	Team	Apps	(Gls)
2006–2014	Melgar	22	(0)
2015–	UT Cajamarca	16	(0)
- * Club domestic league appearances and goals as of 20 November 2012

Juan Pablo Begazo Valvidia (born 18 May 1988) is a Peruvian footballer who plays for Universidad Técnica de Cajamarca in the Torneo Descentralizado, as a goalkeeper.

== Career ==
Begazo began his senior career by joining FBC Melgar's first team in 2006. In his first season, he served as a back-up keeper for Diego Carranza and Manuel Riofrío. The following season he made seven Torneo Descentralizado league appearances as the fourth choice goalkeeper under manager Rafael Castillo.
