= Cristóbal Cubilla =

Paraguayan footballer (born 1962)

Personal information
- Full name: Cristóbal Cubilla Delgadillo
- Date of birth: 1 January 1962 (age 64)
- Place of birth: Paraguay
- Position: Midfielder

Senior career*
Years	Team	Apps	(Gls)
1980	Independiente FBC		
1981–1985	Cerro Porteño		
1986–1987	Club Sol de América		
1987–1988	Club Necaxa		
1988–1989	Once Caldas		
1990–1991	Club Olimpia		
1992	Club Libertad		
1993	Club Olimpia		
1993	Club Guaraní		
1994	Humaitá FBC		
1995	Club Atlético Tembetary		
1996	FBC Melgar		
1997	Shanghai Shenhua FC		
1998	Foz do Iguaçu Futebol Clube		
- * Club domestic league appearances and goals

Cristóbal Cubilla Delgadillo (1 January 1962) is a Paraguayan football manager and former footballer who last managed Club Pilcomayo FBC.

== Early life ==
Cubilla was born in 1982 in Paraguay. He is a native of Campo Grande, Paraguay.

== Playing career ==
Cubilla started his career with Paraguayan side Independiente FBC. In 1981, he signed for Paraguayan side Cerro Porteño. In 1986, he signed for Paraguayan side Club Sol de América. He helped the club win the league. In 1987, he signed for Mexican side Club Necaxa. In 1988, he signed for Colombian side Once Caldas. In 1990, he signed for Paraguayan side Club Olimpia. He helped the club win the 1990 Copa Libertadores. In 1992, he signed for Paraguayan side Club Libertad. In 1993, he returned to Paraguayan side Club Olimpia. In 1993, he signed for Paraguayan side Club Guaraní. In 1994, he signed for Paraguayan side Humaitá FBC. In 1995, he signed for Paraguayan side Club Atlético Tembetary. In 1996, he signed for Peruvian side FBC Melgar. In 1997, he signed for Chinese side Shanghai Shenhua FC. In 1998, he signed for Brazilian side Foz do Iguaçu Futebol Clube.

== Managerial career ==
Cubilla managed Paraguayan side Club Atlético 3 de Febrero. He was described as "managed to save them from relegation".

== Personal life ==
Cubilla has children. He has been nicknamed "Cirujano".
