= Independencia District, Pisco =

Independencia
- District
- Interactive map of Independencia
- Coordinates: 13°41′38″S 76°1′26″W
- Country: Peru
- Region: Ica
- Province: Pisco
- Founded: October 29, 1942
- Capital: Independecia

Government
  - Mayor: Marino Ucharima Tacsi

Area
  - Total: 272.34 km^{2} (105.15 sq mi)
- Elevation: 211 m (692 ft)

Population (2005 census)
  - Total: 11,166
  - Density: 41.000/km^{2} (106.19/sq mi)
- Time zone: UTC-5 (PET)
- UBIGEO: 110504

Independencia District is one of eight districts of the province Pisco in Peru.
