= Koichi Aparicio =

Peruvian footballer (born 1992)

Personal information
- Full name: Roberto Efraín Koichi; Aparicio Mori
- Date of birth: 6 June 1992 (age 34)
- Place of birth: Callao, Peru
- Height: 1.89 m (6 ft 2 in)
- Position: Centre-back

Team information
- Current team: UTC Cajamarca
- Number: 4

Senior career*
Years	Team	Apps	(Gls)
2011–2016	Alianza Lima	95	(2)
2017	Universidad San Martín	26	(1)
2018	Unión Comercio	9	(0)
2019	Sport Huancayo	7	(0)
2020	UTC Cajamarca	5	(0)
2021–2023	Cienciano	35	(1)
2024–	UTC Cajamarca	35	(6)

International career
2013–2014	Peru	2	(0)
- * Club domestic league appearances and goals as of 30 December 2025

Roberto Efraín Koichi Aparicio Mori (born 6 June 1992), commonly known as Koichi Aparicio, is a Peruvian professional footballer who plays as a centre-back for UTC Cajamarca in Liga 1.

== Club career ==
Koichi Aparicio made his debut with the Alianza Lima first team in a Torneo Intermedio cup match in 2011, where he partnered Carlos Ascues in the centre of defense and his side eventually lost on penalties away to José Gálvez FBC. This was his only appearance for the first team in 2011, and he would have to wait until the following season to make his league debut.

Aparicio finally made his Torneo Descentralizado league debut in round 35 in the 2–2 draw at home against Universidad César Vallejo.
