= Carlos Neumann =

Paraguayan footballer (born 1986)

Personal information
- Full name: Carlos Ariel Neumann Torres
- Date of birth: 3 January 1986 (age 40)
- Place of birth: Valenzuela, Paraguay
- Height: 1.82 m (6 ft 0 in)
- Position: Forward

Senior career*
Years	Team	Apps	(Gls)
2005–2009	Club Guaraní		(3+)
2006	→ Choré Central (loan)		
2006	→ Sport Colombia (loan)		
2007	Club Atlético 3 de Febrero→(loan)		
2009-2010	Club Atlético 3 de Febrero		(3)
2010	Club Rubio Ñu	15	(3)
2010	Club Sport Colombia	18	(4)
2010-2011	Toros Neza	15	(2)
2011	General Caballero Sport Club	5	(0)
2012-2013	Club Real Potosí	37	(20)
2013-2014	Club San José	40	(23)
2014-2015	C.D. Jorge Wilstermann	39	(11)
2015-2016	The Strongest	35	(13)
2016-2017	Cusco FC	38	(11)
2017-2020	Sport Huancayo	120	(51)
2021	Alianza Universidad	21	(5)
- * Club domestic league appearances and goals

Carlos Ariel Neumann Torres (born 3 January 1986) is a Paraguayan former professional footballer who played as a forward. He broke a record in Bolivian football when scored 23 goals in a single season for San José de Oruro.

== Career ==
=== Guaraní ===
==== 2005 season ====
In the 2005 season, Neumann was in Guaraní's team with national team defenders Aureliano Torres and Julio Manzur, Argentines Hernan Barcos, Hernan Lambert, Valentin Filippini, Matthias Fondato, Paulo Centurion, Hilario Navarro and Juan Fleita, and young players David Mendieta and Julian Benitez. He also appeared in 1 game for Guaraní in the 2005 Copa Sudamericana.

==== Choré Central (loan) ====
In 2006, Neumann played for Choré Central in the División Intermedia, on loan from Guaraní. On 29 April, Neumanm scored a 67th minute penalty for Choré Central in a 2–0 away victory against Sport Colombia. On 28 May, Neumann scored a 59th minute penalty for Choré, the second goal in a 2–1 home victory against Rubio Ñu, after trailing 1–0. On 11 June, he scored in a 2–1 home victory against Sol de America.

==== Sport Colombia (loan) ====
On 8 July, Neumann scored his first goals for Sport Colombia, a hat-trick, in a 3–0 home victory against Cerro Porteño PF, noting in the 9th minute, a 35th minute penalty and in the 45th minute. On 6 August, he scored in the 87th minute to equalize the game at 3–3 in a home draw against Rubio Ñu.

==== 3 de Febrero (loan) ====
Neumann joined Ciudad del Este team 3 de Febrero for the Primera División season, on loan from Guaraní. When on loan, he teamed with defender Wilson Mendez, Argentine Hugo Jazmín and Brazilian Fernando Oliveira.

==== 2007 season ====
In 2007, he was coached by Carlos Leeb at Guaraní. In the 2007 Guaraní team, Neumann teammated with Jonathan Fabbro.

==== 2009 season ====
Neumann totalled four games for Guaraní in the 2009 Copa Libertadores.

=== San José ===
Whilst in Bolivian football, Neumann had the target of a naturalization to play for Bolivia, and coach Julio Cesar Baldivieso asked of Neumann to achieve the naturalization to play for Bolivia.

=== Jorge Wilstermann ===
He appeared in two games for Jorge Wilstermann in the 2014 Copa Sudamericana.

=== The Strongest ===
He amassed five games for The Strongest in the 2016 Copa Libertadores.

=== Sport Huancayo ===
In 2017, Neumann signed for Sport Huancayo in the Peruvian Primera División. At Sport Huancayo he made 87 league appearances and scored 43 goals.

In November 2020, Neumann was Player of the Week after a Copa Sudamericana game against Uruguayan team Liverpool Montevideo, scoring the second goal in a 2–1 away victory. Neumann entered the field in the 75th minute of the game and scored three minutes later. The game was a historic qualification to the round of 16 phase.

Between 2018 and 2020, Neumann marked 1 goal in 11 games for Sport Huancayo in the Copa Sudamericana competitions.

== Personal life ==
Neumann admires Peru national football team striker Paolo Guerrero. He has a football academy in Huancayo in Peru. He is nicknamed El Tanque, meaning The Tank in Spanish. In 2016, Neumann told Crónica press that at Guaraní, Julio Manzur and German Centurión were the hardest defenders he'd encountered.
