= Walter Ibáñez =

Uruguayan footballer (born 1984)

Personal information
- Full name: Walter Fernando Ibáñez Costa
- Date of birth: 10 December 1984 (age 41)
- Place of birth: Rivera, Uruguay
- Height: 1.82 m (6 ft 0 in)
- Position: Centre back

Team information
- Current team: Deportivo Maldonado

Senior career*
Years	Team	Apps	(Gls)
2005–2008	Fénix	34	(0)
2008	River Plate	9	(0)
2009	Defensor	8	(1)
2010	Cerro	12	(0)
2010–2011	Defensor	24	(1)
2012–2014	Alianza Lima	107	(20)
2015	Universidad Católica	15	(1)
2016	Alianza Lima	40	(4)
2017	Cerro	3	(0)
2017	Deportivo La Guaira	14	(0)
2018	Cienciano	30	(6)
2019	Rampla Juniors	7	(1)
2019–	Deportivo Maldonado	4	(1)
- * Club domestic league appearances and goals as of 22:11, 29 October 2019 (UTC)

Walter Fernando Ibáñez Costa (born December 10, 1984, in Rivera), commonly known as Walter Ibáñez, is a Uruguayan footballer who plays as a defender for Deportivo Maldonado.
