= Benjamín Ubierna =

Peruvian footballer (born 1991)

Personal information
- Full name: Benjamín Ubierna Baradiarán
- Date of birth: 22 November 1991 (age 34)
- Place of birth: Buenos Aires, Argentina
- Height: 1.89 m (6 ft 2 in)
- Position: Midfielder

Team information
- Current team: Deportivo Coopsol
- Number: 11

Youth career
- Universidad San Martín

Senior career*
Years	Team	Apps	(Gls)
2010–2014	Universidad San Martín	78	(3)
2015–2016	Juan Aurich	42	(3)
2016	Moreirense	0	(0)
2017–2018	UTC	62	(6)
2019	USM Porres	9	(0)
2019	Carlos A. Mannucci	10	(0)
2020–	Cienciano	5	(0)

International career
2011	Peru U20	3	(0)
2014–	Peru	3	(0)
- * Club domestic league appearances and goals as of 19:46, 13 April 2020 (UTC)

Benjamín Ubierna Baradiarán (born 22 November 1991) is a Peruvian footballer who currently plays for Deportivo Coopsol.

== Club career ==
Ubierna has spent his entire professional career with San Martín, making his professional debut in 2010. However, he was drafted by MLS club Real Salt Lake in the third round of 2012 MLS Supplemental Draft on 17 January 2012.

On 17 July 2016, Moreirense F.C. announced they had agreed a deal with Ubierna signing a one-year contract.

== International career ==
Born in Argentina, he earned his first cap for Peru against Panama on a friendly match on August 6, 2014.

== Personal life ==
He was born in Buenos Aires to an Argentine father and a Peruvian mother. After that, he came back to Peru.

== Honours ==
Universidad San Martín

- Torneo Descentralizado: 2010
