= Carlos Fernández (footballer, born 1984) =

Peruvian footballer

Personal information
- Full name: Carlos Osvaldo Fernández Maldonando
- Date of birth: 1 November 1984 (age 42)
- Place of birth: Lima, Peru
- Height: 1.72 m (5 ft 8 in)
- Position: Midfielder

Senior career*
Years	Team	Apps	(Gls)
2002–2004	Alianza Lima	12	(0)
2004	Estudiantes de Medicina	20	(2)
2005	Alianza Lima	41	(4)
2006–2007	Cienciano	46	(3)
2008	Alianza Lima	37	(3)
2009–2015	Universidad San Martín	170	(4)
2016–2017	Alianza Atlético	51	(1)

International career
2009–2012	Peru	3	(0)
- * Club domestic league appearances and goals

Carlos Osvaldo Fernández Maldonando (born 1 November 1984) is a Peruvian former professional footballer who played as a midfielder.

== Club career ==
Carlos Fernández started his senior career with Alianza Lima, making his Torneo Descentralizado debut in 2002 season with them.

In January 2006 Fernández joined Cienciano. In his first season with Cienciano he made 39 appearances with 2 goals, and in his last he played in seven matches in the 2007 Descentralizado season.

Then In January 2009 he signed for Universidad San Martín.
