= Sergio Ibarra =

Argentine footballer (born 1973)

Personal information
- Full name: Sergio Ramón Ibarra Guzmán
- Date of birth: January 11, 1973 (age 53)
- Place of birth: Río Cuarto, Argentina
- Height: 1.83 m (6 ft 0 in)
- Position: Striker

Youth career
- 1986-1990: Sportivo Atenas

Senior career*
| Years | Team | Apps | (Gls) |
| 1991 | Sportivo Atenas | | |
| 1992 | Ciclista Lima | | (7) |
| 1993–1996 | Alianza Atlético | | (45) |
| 1997 | Municipal | 22 | (13) |
| 1998–1999 | Sport Boys | 61 | (18) |
| 2000 | Deportivo Wanka | 22 | (16) |
| 2000 | Águila | | |
| 2001 | Universitario | 41 | (14) |
| 2002 | Alianza Atlético | | (22) |
| 2003 | Unión Huaral | 15 | (7) |
| 2003 | Estudiantes | 29 | (9) |
| 2004–2005 | Cienciano | 77 | (44) |
| 2006 | Once Caldas | 15 | (2) |
| 2006 | José Gálvez | 21 | (13) |
| 2007 | Sport Boys | 37 | (12) |
| 2008 | FBC Melgar | 46 | (20) |
| 2009 | Juan Aurich | 32 | (15) |
| 2010–2011 | Cienciano | 51 | (17) |
| 2012–2013 | Sport Huancayo | 70 | (30) |
| 2014 | José Gálvez | 11 | (4) |
| 2014 | San Simón | 6 | (0) |

Managerial career
- 2010: Cienciano
- 2013: Sport Huancayo
- 2015–2016: Cienciano (assistant coach)
- 2016: Deportivo Coopsol (assistant coach)
- 2016–2017: Deportivo Coopsol
- 2017 –2018: Cienciano
- * Club domestic league appearances and goals as of 19 April 2015

Sergio Ramón "El Checho" Ibarra (born January 11, 1973) is a retired Argentine footballer who played as a striker.

== Career ==
Although born in Argentina, Ibarra has played during almost all of his career in Peru, where he first moved at age 19 to join the ranks of Ciclista Lima in the first division, in 1992.

His biggest claim to fame was in 2004 when he won the Recopa against Boca Juniors as part of Cienciano. That same year the Argentine football magazine El Gráfico declared that he was the Argentine player who had scored the most goals worldwide (21), one more than Carlos Tevez, Andrés Silvera, and Luis Bonnet, and two more than Javier Saviola.

On March 2, 2008, Ibarra broke the all-time scoring record in the Peruvian league, netting his 193rd goal in a 1–0 win over Cienciano. He is the Peruvian League Top Scorer with 226 goals.

== Playing style ==
Ibarra is famous for scoring many goals despite having what many consider as very limited technical abilities. He is very often the top scorer of his team.

== Personal ==
He is nicknamed "Checho", "Manteca" and/or "Shevchecho" after the famous Ukrainian footballer Andriy Shevchenko. He has obtained Peruvian nationality.

== Honours ==
=== Club ===
Cienciano

- Recopa Sudamericana: 2004
- Torneo Apertura: 2005
