= Estadio Elías Aguirre =

Football stadium in Chiclayo, Peru

Estadio Elias Aguirre
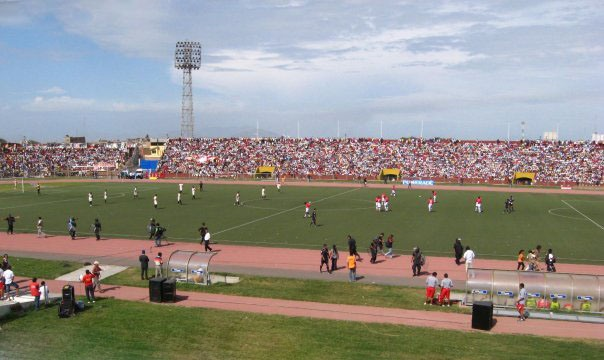
- Interactive map of Estadio Elias Aguirre
- Full name: Estadio Capitán Remigio Elías Aguirre Romero
- Location: Chiclayo, Peru
- Coordinates: 6°46′6″S 79°51′39″W
- Owner: Regional government
- Operator: Instituto Peruano del Deporte
- Capacity: 23,000
- Surface: Polytan Ligaturf 240 ACS 65
- Field size: 105 x 68 m

Construction
- Built: 1970
- Opened: 1970
- Renovated: 2004, 2005
- Expanded: 2004

Tenant
- Juan Aurich

Estadio Capitán Remigio Elías Aguirre Romero is a multi-purpose stadium administrated by the governmental Instituto Peruano del Deporte in Chiclayo, Peru. It was built in 1970 named after the 19th century Peruvian sailor Elías Aguirre Romero. Its current spectator capacity is 24,500 (can be limited to 20,000 for safety reasons) after the renovations performed for the 2004 Copa América, and had artificial turf installed for the 2005 FIFA U-17 World Championship. The most recognized club to play at this stadium is Juan Aurich.

== History ==
Estadio Capitán Remigio Elías Aguirre Romero was built in 1970 and renovated in 2004 for the Copa América Peru was to host. The stadium hosted 5 matches for this tournament in which the national football teams of Peru, Argentina, Mexico, Uruguay, and Ecuador participated. The game that opened the Elías Aguirre's participation in this tournament was a group stage 2–2 draw between Mexico and Uruguay, and the game that closed its participation was a 1–0 Argentina win over hosts Peru in the quarterfinals. The stadium received a minor renovation for the 2005 FIFA U-17 World Championship. The renovations consisted of installing Polytan Ligaturf which received the FIFA 1 star recommended rating. During this championship, the Elías Aguirre hosted 6 matches; 5 group stage matches and 1 semifinal match.

The stadium is administrated by the regional government of Lambayeque and principally used by local teams of Chiclayo which participate in the Copa Perú. Additionally, football club Juan Aurich gained promotion to the Primera División in 2007 after conquering the 2007 Copa Perú. They play in the Primera División since 2008 and qualified to the 2010 Copa Libertadores in which the stadium hosted international matches against the Argentinian defending champions Estudiantes de La Plata and Bolivian Bolívar, Mexican Estudiantes Tecos in addition to local Alianza Lima.

In addition to football events, the stadium can host track and field events and is located within a sports complex.

== International matches hosted ==
Date	Team #1	Res.	Team #2	Round	Attendance	Tournament
7 July 2004	Mexico	2–2	Uruguay	Group B	25.000	Copa América
7 July 2004	Argentina	6–1	Ecuador	Group B	24.000	Copa América
10 July 2004	Uruguay	2–1	Ecuador	Group B	25.000	Copa América
10 July 2004	Argentina	0–1	Mexico	Group B	25.000	Copa América
17 July 2004	Peru	0–1	Argentina	Quarterfinals	26.500	Copa América
17 September 2005	Ivory Coast	3–4	Italy	Group C	14,800	FIFA U-17 World Championship
17 September 2005	United States	3–2	North Korea	Group C	15,200	FIFA U-17 World Championship
20 September 2005	Italy	1–3	United States	Group C	15,240	FIFA U-17 World Championship
20 September 2005	Ivory Coast	0–3	North Korea	Group C	14,500	FIFA U-17 World Championship
22 September 2005	Australia	2–1	Uruguay	Group B	11,100	FIFA U-17 World Championship
29 September 2005	Mexico	4–0	Netherlands	Semifinals	16,800	FIFA U-17 World Championship
6 August 2009	Alianza Atlético (Peru)	0–0	(Venezuela) Deportivo Anzoátegui	First stage	7,112	Copa Sudamericana
29 January 2010	Juan Aurich (Peru)	2–0	(Mexico) Estudiantes Tecos	First stage	10,312	Copa Libertadores
24 February 2010	Juan Aurich (Peru)	2–0	(Bolivia) Bolívar	First stage	10,759	Copa Libertadores
16 March 2010	Juan Aurich (Peru)	4–2	(Peru) Alianza Lima	First stage	13,253	Copa Libertadores
30 March 2010	Juan Aurich (Peru)	0-2	(Argentina) Estudiantes	First stage	19,904	Copa Libertadores
25 August 2011	Juan Aurich (Peru)	1-2	(Colombia) La Equidad	First stage	–	Copa Sudamericana
