= Los Caimanes =

- Full name: Centro Cultural Deportivo Los Caimanes de Puerto Eten
- Nickname(s): Lacoste; Reptiles; Los de Puerto Eten
- Founded: May 22, 1957
- Ground: Estadio Elías Aguirre, Chiclayo
- Capacity: 25,000
- Chairman: (Peru) Flor Campos Zegarra
- Manager: (Peru) José Bances
- League: Copa Perú
| Home colours | Away colours | Third colours |

Centro Cultural Deportivo Los Caimanes, commonly known as Los Caimanes is a Peruvian football club, playing in the city of Puerto Etén, Chiclayo, Lambayeque.

== History ==
The club was founded on the May 22, 1957 under the name of Club Cultural y Deportivo Los Caimanes de Puerto Etén in the city of Puerto Etén, Chiclayo, Lambayeque.

In the 2011 Copa Perú, the club qualified to the National Stage, but was eliminated by Pacífico in the semi-finals. In 2012 they played in the 2012 Peruvian Segunda Division where they finished third. In 2013 they won the 2013 Peruvian Segunda División and were promoted to the 2014 Torneo Descentralizado. On their debut year in the first division the club was relegated to the Peruvian Segunda Division after finishing 15th on the aggregated table and losing a relegation play-off against Sport Huancayo.

== Honours ==
=== National ===
- Peruvian Segunda División:

Winners (1): 2013
Runner-up (1): 2015

=== Regional ===
- Región I:

Winners (1): 2011

- Liga Departamental de Lambayeque:

Winners (2): 1960, 2011

- Liga Superior de Lambayeque:

Winners (1): 2011

- Liga Provincial de Chiclayo:

Runner-up (1): 2010

- Liga Distrital de Eten:

Winners (1): 2010

== See also ==
- List of football clubs in Peru
- Peruvian football league system
