= Club Social Deportivo San Simón =

Peruvian football club

San Simón
- Full name: Club Social Deportivo San Simón
- Founded: 5 January 1983; 43 years ago (as Club Deportivo Comunitario Laboral San Simón)
- Ground: Complejo deportivo Costa Verde, Lima, Peru
- Manager: Samir Manay
- League: Copa Perú
Home colours

Club Social Deportivo San Simón is a Peruvian football originally located in Moquegua, before moving to Magdalena del Mar (Lima).

== History ==
Founded in Moquegua on 5 January 1983, as Club Deportivo Comunitario Laboral San Simón, the club won the Copa Perú final in 2013, defeating Unión Huaral 2-0 and 2–3. This victory allowed them to play in the first division the following year, an experience that was short-lived as San Simón was relegated to the second division at the end of the season. They were even administratively relegated from the second division due to a debt of nearly one million soles and ultimately folded.

The club was re-established in Lima in 2017 under its current name thanks to the initiative of journalist Kenny Romero, who became its president. It has since participated in the Magdalena district league.

== Honours ==
=== National ===
- Copa Perú: 1

Winners (1): 2013

=== Regional ===
- Región VII: 1

Winners (1): 2013

- Liga Departamental de Moquegua:

Runner-up (1): 2013

- Liga Provincial de Mariscal Nieto:

Winners (2): 2011, 2012
Runner-up (1): 2013

- Liga Distrital de Moquegua:

Winners (1): 2012
Runner-up (2): 2011, 2013

- Liga Distrital de Magdalena del Mar:

Runner-up (1): 2018

== Notable players ==
Sergio Ibarra, the all-time leading scorer in the history of the Peruvian league, ended his career in 2014 with San Simón. Carlos Zegarra and Miguel Mostto, Peruvian internationals in the 2000s, played there in 2014 and 2015, respectively. It would also be Miguel Mostto's last club as a player.

== See also ==
- List of football clubs in Peru
- Peruvian football league system
