= Sport Huancayo =

Association football club in Peru

Club Sport Huancayo
- Full name: Club Sport Huancayo
- Nicknames: Rojo Matador; Los Huancaínos
- Founded: February 7, 2007; 19 years ago
- Stadium: Estadio Huancayo
- Chairman: Raúl Rojas
- Manager: Roberto Mosquera
- League: Liga 1
- 2025: Liga 1, 11th of 19
- Website: sporthuancayo.com
Home colours	Away colours	Third colours

Club Sport Huancayo is a Peruvian professional football club based in Huancayo, Peru. It was founded in 2007 by Raúl Rojas and Édgar Araníbar. The club has been playing in the Peruvian Primera División since 2009, having gained promotion from winning the 2008 Copa Perú.

== History ==
=== Founding ===
On February 7, 2007, Huancaína Sport Club was founded by the initiative of a beer company led by Raúl Rojas and Édgar Araníbar, which purchased the playing rights of Club Escuela de Fútbol Huancayo, who was at that time playing in the Liga Distrital de El Tambo. In 2008, the club changed its name to Sport Huancayo to better identify themselves with the city of Huancayo, where the club is based in.

=== Copa Perú ===
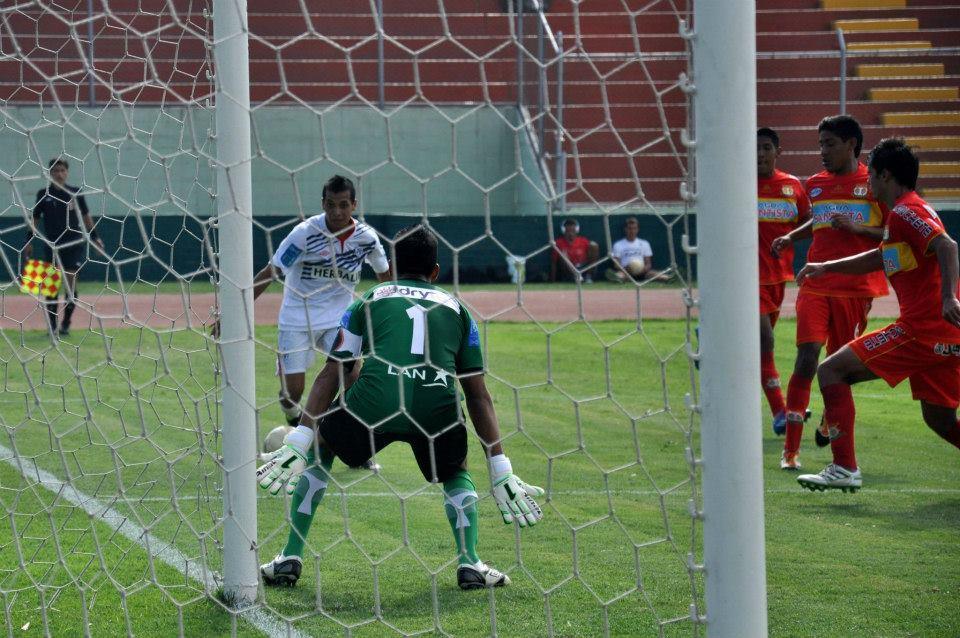
Deportivo Wanka vs Sport Huancayo

Sport Huancayo participated in the Copa Perú, after being promoted from the Liga Distrital de El Tambo and Liga Departamental de Junín in 2008.

In the 2008 Copa Perú, the club got promoted to the 2009 Torneo Descentralizado, the top tier of Peruvian football, for the first time as Copa Perú champion, when it defeated Atlético Torino, Colegio Nacional Iquitos, and Cobresol in the Copa Perú's Final Stage. It was also the first and only time the club won a national title.

=== Professional era ===
In the 2009 Torneo Descentralizado, the club was fourth place and qualified to the 2010 Copa Sudamericana, with the successful coach Cristóbal Cubilla. Sport Huancayo got eliminated in the Second Stage of the Copa Sudamericana by Defensor Sporting of Uruguay.

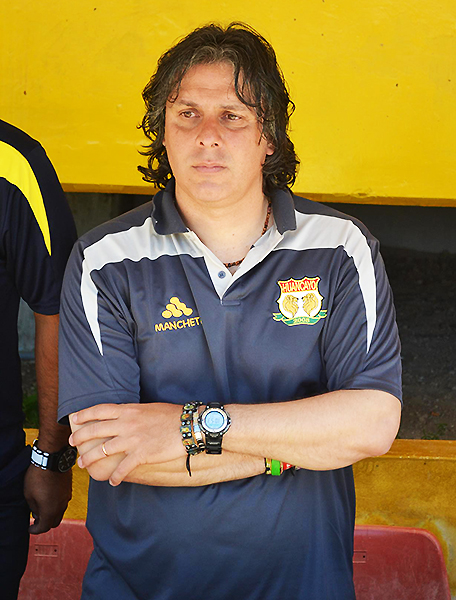
Marcelo Messina, head coach in 2014

In the 2011 Torneo Descentralizado, the club finished in third place and qualified to its first Copa Libertadores for the 2012 season. In the 2012 Copa Libertadores, the club was eliminated by Arsenal de Sarandí in the First Stage. In the Peruvian tournament the club finished in sixth position, in this way, they managed to qualify for the 2013 Copa Sudamericana. In 2014, the club was saved from relegation after beating Caimanes 1-0 in the relegation play-off.

In 2016, the coach Diego Umaña took charge of the team. In the Copa Sudamericana the club was eliminated in the second round, after losing to Sol de America. Since 2016, the club qualified for every Copa Sudamericana edition up until 2021. In 2018, they eliminated Unión Española in the first stage of the Copa Sudamericana, then they were eliminated by Caracas FC. In the newly created,2019 Copa Bicentenario, Sport Huancayo reached the final and lost to Atlético Grau on penalties. Their best result in the Sudamericana was in 2020, where they reached the Round of 16. In the 2022 season the club placed fourth in the league and qualified for the Copa Libertadores for second time. They got eliminated by Club Nacional of Paraguay in the qualifying stage.

== Kit and crest ==
The teams home colours primarily consisted of red and orange shirt and shorts with socks usually being the same colour. It's away colours are mostly green. The club also has a third kit, which is white and gold.

The current club badge is a lion with the club name above. It was changed from the old badge in 2023, which was a crest with two lions facing each other and Huancayo above. The club mascot is a lion.

2007–2023

2004–present

== Stadium ==
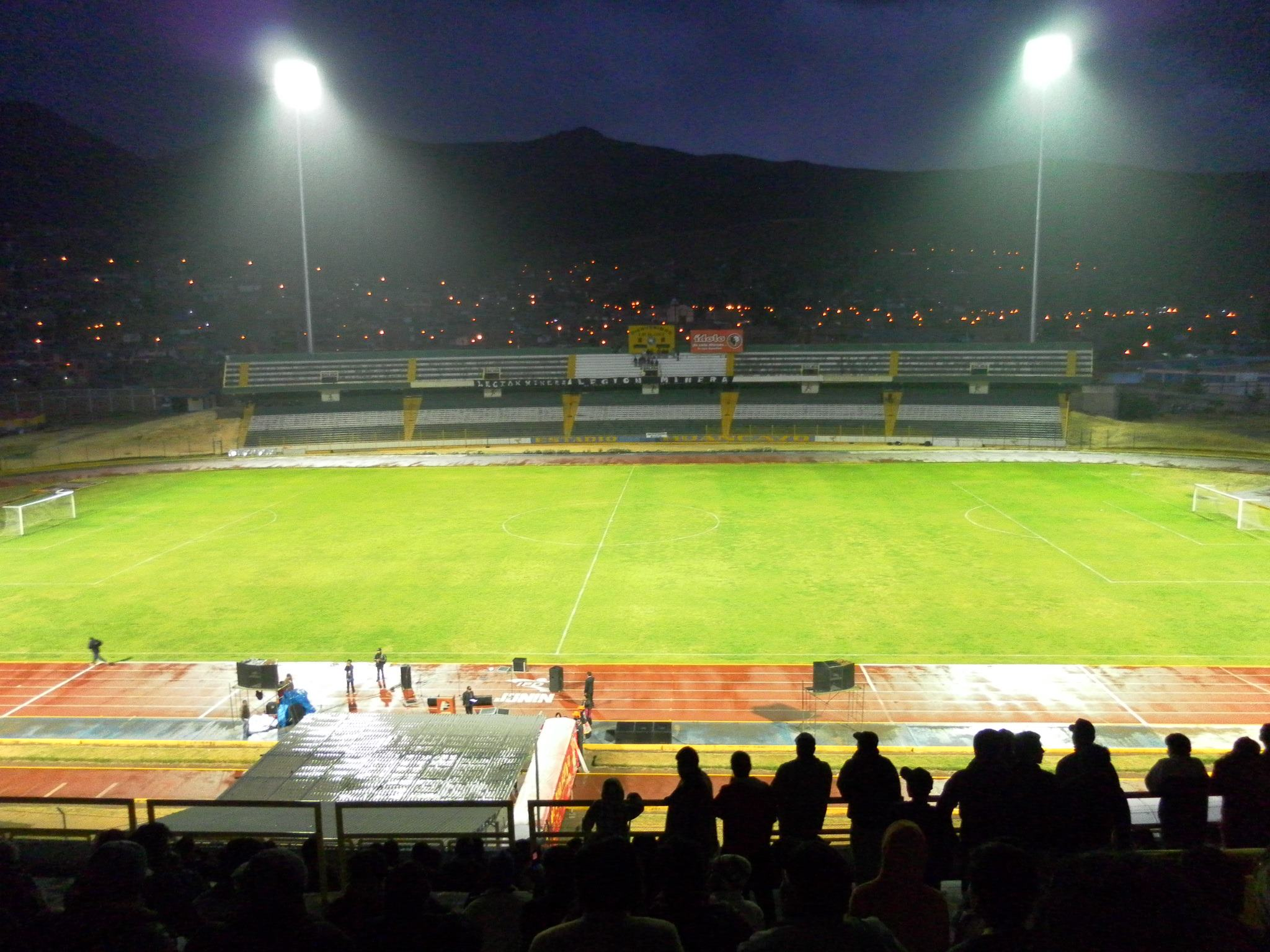
Estadio Huancayo at night

Sport Huancayo's home stadium is Estadio Huancayo. The stadium is also home to Deportivo Junín. It was constructed in 1962 and owned by the Instituto Peruano de Deporte. It has a capacity of 20,000 and is the largest stadium in Huancayo. The stadium is part of a larger sports complex, which features numerous practice fields for futsal, football, volleyball and handball, along with a gym. A renovation project was planned in 2019, which planned to increase the stadium to 40,000. The project is still in development and construction has not yet begun.

== Players ==
=== Current squad ===
As of 16 March, 2026

Note: Flags indicate national team as defined under FIFA eligibility rules; some limited exceptions apply. Players may hold more than one non-FIFA nationality.

No.	Pos.	Nation	Player
1	GK	PER	Massimo Sandi
2	DF	PER	Hugo Ángeles
3	DF	BRA	Gustavo Rissi
4	DF	PER	Juan Barreda
6	MF	PER	Edu Villar
7	FW	PER	Rick Campodónico
8	MF	PER	Diego Carabaño
9	FW	PER	Juan Martínez
10	MF	ARG	Nahuel Luján
11	MF	ARG	Javier Sanguinetti
12	GK	PER	Ángel Zamudio
15	DF	PER	Axel Chávez
16	DF	PER	Jean Falconí
17	FW	COL	Yorleys Mena

No.	Pos.	Nation	Player
19	FW	PER	Ronal Huaccha
20	FW	PER	Jeremy Canela
21	GK	PER	Diego Campos
22	MF	PER	Ricardo Salcedo (captain)
23	FW	PER	Piero Magallanes
26	DF	PER	Marcelo Gaona
28	DF	PER	Jeremy Rostaing
29	GK	PER	Aldair Ccorahua
38	MF	PER	Edu Villar
70	DF	COL	Jimmy Valoyes
92	DF	COL	Yonatan Murillo
99	FW	ARG	Franco Caballero

== Honours ==
=== Senior titles ===
Keys

- Record
- ^{(s)} Shared record

Type	Competition	Titles	Runner-up	Winning years	Runner-up years
National (League)	Copa Perú	1	—	2008	—
Half-year / Short tournament (League)	Torneo Apertura	—	2	—	2020, 2022
Half-year / Short tournament (League)	Torneo Clausura	1	—	2026	—
Half-year / Short tournament (League)	Torneo de Verano	—	1	—	2018
National (Cups)	Copa Bicentenario	—	1	—	2019
Regional (League)	Región II	—	1	—	2008
Regional (League)	Liga Departamental de Junín	—	1	—	2008
Regional (League)	Liga Provincial de Huancayo	—	1	—	2008
Regional (League)	Liga Distrital de El Tambo	2	—	2007, 2008	—

=== Youth ===
Type	Competition	Titles	Runner-up	Winning years	Runner-up years
National (League)	Liga 3	1	—	2025	—
National (League)	Torneo de Promoción y Reservas	1	1	2017	2019
Half-year / Short tournament (League)	Torneo de Verano (Reservas)	—	1	—	2017
Half-year / Short tournament (League)	Torneo Apertura (Reservas)	—	2	—	2017, 2018
Half-year / Short tournament (League)	Torneo Clausura (Reservas)	1	—	2017	—

== Performance in CONMEBOL competitions ==
Competition	A	P	W	D	L	GF	GA	DG	Pts
Copa Libertadores	1	2	0	1	1	1	4	-3	1
Copa Sudamericana	8	30	7	8	15	28	55	-27	29

A = appearances, P = matches played, W = won, D = drawn, L = lost, GF = goals for, GA = goals against, DG = difference goals, Pts = points.

=== Copa Libertadores ===
Season	Round	Country	Club	Home	Away	Aggregate	Ref
2012	First Stage	(Argentina)	Arsenal	1–1	0–3	1–3	
2023	First Stage	(Paraguay)	Nacional	2–1	1-3	3-4	

=== Copa Sudamericana ===
Season	Round	Country	Club	Home	Away	Aggregate	Ref
2010	Second Stage	(Uruguay)	Defensor Sporting	2–0	0–9	2–9	
2013	First Stage	(Ecuador)	Emelec	1–3	0–4	1–7	
2016	First Stage	(Venezuela)	Deportivo Anzoátegui	1–0	1–2	2–2	
2016	Second Stage	(Paraguay)	Sol de América	1–1	0–1	1–2	
2017	First Stage	(Bolivia)	Nacional Potosí	2–1	1–3	3–4	
2018	First Stage	(Chile)	Unión Española	3–0	0–0	3–0	
2018	Second Stage	(Venezuela)	Caracas	3–4	0–2	3–6	
2019	First Stage	(Uruguay)	Montevideo Wanderers	1–1	0–2	1–3	
2020	First Stage	(Argentina)	Argentinos Juniors	0–0	1–1	1–1	
2020	Second Stage	(Uruguay)	Liverpool	1-1	2-1	3-2	
2020	Round of 16	(Chile)	Coquimbo Unido	0-2	0-0	0-2	
2021	First Stage	(Peru)	UTC	4-0	1-0	5-0	
2021	Group Stage	(Uruguay)	Peñarol	0-0	1-5		
2021	Group Stage	(Paraguay)	River Plate	1-2	1-2		
2021	Group Stage	(Brazil)	Corinthians	0-3	0-5		

=== U-20 Copa Libertadores ===
Season	Round	Country	Club	Score	Aggregate	Ref
2018	Group stage	(Ecuador)	Independiente del Valle	1-6		
2018	Group stage	(Uruguay)	Nacional	0-8		
2018	Group stage	(Chile)	Colo-Colo	0-2		

== Records ==
=== Year-by-year ===
This is a partial list of the last five seasons completed by Sport Huancayo. For the full season-by-season history, see List of Sport Huancayo seasons.

Season	League									Position		National Cups		Continental / Other		Tournament Top goalscorer(s)	
Season	Div	Competition	Pld	W	D	L	GF	GA	Pts	Pos	Play-offs (Note: Since 1966, play-off games have been used as a tie breaker between teams tie on points for promotion or relegation or as a post-season stage to decide the national championship. Whenever they have occurred, the club's position on that stage is shown in this column.)	National Cups		Continental / Other		Name(s)	Goals
2017	1	Torneo de Verano	14	5	3	6	19	23	18	5th	DNQ	—	—	Copa Sudamericana	R1	(Peru) Mauricio Montes	17
2017	1	Torneo Apertura	15	7	5	3	23	16	26	4th	DNQ	—	—	Copa Sudamericana	R1	(Peru) Mauricio Montes	17
2017	1	Torneo Clausura	15	5	5	5	22	22	20	7th (Note: Sport Huancayo was awarded 2 points for winning the 2017 Torneo de Promoción y Reserva.)	DNQ	—	—	Copa Sudamericana	R1	(Peru) Mauricio Montes	17
2018	1	Torneo de Verano	14	8	3	3	29	20	27	1st	2nd (Note: Sport Huancayo lost to Sporting Cristal in the Torneo de Verano finals.)	—	—	Copa Sudamericana	R2	(Paraguay) Carlos Neumann	27
2018	1	Torneo Apertura	15	4	6	5	16	15	18	10th	DNQ	—	—	Copa Sudamericana	R2	(Paraguay) Carlos Neumann	27
2018	1	Torneo Clausura	15	3	7	5	19	22	16	15th	DNQ	—	—	Copa Sudamericana	R2	(Paraguay) Carlos Neumann	27
2019	1	Torneo Apertura	17	6	6	5	22	23	24	10th	DNQ	Copa Bicentenario	RU	Copa Sudamericana	R1	(Paraguay) Carlos Neumann	14
2019	1	Torneo Clausura	17	7	5	5	24	21	26	8th	DNQ	Copa Bicentenario	RU	Copa Sudamericana	R1	(Paraguay) Carlos Neumann	14
2020	1	Torneo Apertura	19	10	5	4	23	15	35	2nd	DNQ	Copa Bicentenario	— (Note: The Copa Bicentenario was canceled due to the COVID-19 pandemic.)	Copa Sudamericana	Ro16	(Peru) Marcio Valverde	11
2020	1	Torneo Clausura	9	2	3	4	9	15	9	9th	DNQ	Copa Bicentenario	—	Copa Sudamericana	Ro16	(Peru) Marcio Valverde	11
2021	1	Fase 1	9	3	3	3	8	9	12	4th	DNQ	Copa Bicentenario	R1	Copa Sudamericana	GS	—	—
2021	1	Fase 2	17	3	9	5	18	21	18	13th	DNQ	Copa Bicentenario	R1	Copa Sudamericana	GS	—	—

=== Top goalscorers ===
==== International competitions ====
Rank	Player	Nat	CL	CS	Total	Ref.
1	Liliu	(Brazil)		3	3	
2	Manuel Corrales	(Peru)		2	2	
3	Marcio Valverde	(Peru)		2	2	
4	Sergio Ibarra	(Argentina)	1		1	
5	Ronal Huaccha	(Peru)	1		1	

== Managers ==
Below is a list of Sport Huancayo managers from 2009, the club's first season in the Peruvian first division, until the present day.

As of 3 November 2020

Name	Period
(Peru) José Ramírez Cubas	Jan 1, 2009 – May 4, 2009
(Brazil) Luis Ventura	May 4, 2009 – Oct 21, 2010
(Paraguay) Cristóbal Cubilla	Sep 5, 2009 – Dec 31, 2009
(Peru) Rafael Castillo	Jan 1, 2010 – Jun 16, 2010
(Paraguay) Cristóbal Cubilla	Jun 18, 2010 – Sep 19, 2010
(Peru) Roberto Mosquera	Jul 1, 2010 – Dec 31, 2011
(Peru) Miguel Company	Jan 1, 2012 – Apr 19, 2012
(Peru) Wilmar Valencia	Jul 1, 2012 – Dec 11, 2012
(Peru) Moisés Barack	Jan 8, 2013 – Feb 12, 2013
(Argentina) Marcelo Trobbiani	Feb 14, 2013 – Dec 31, 2013

Name	Period
(Argentina) Daniel Córdoba	Dec 28, 2013 – Jul 20, 2014
(Argentina) Marcelo Messina	Jul 20, 2014 – Nov 4, 2014
(Argentina) Walter Lizárraga	Nov 5, 2014 – May 31, 2015
(Peru) Wilmar Valencia	Jun 1, 2015 – Dec 31, 2015
(Colombia) Diego Umaña	Jan 5, 2016 – May 12, 2017
(Paraguay) Rolando Chilavert	May 12, 2017 – Dec 31, 2017
(Argentina) Marcelo Grioni	Jan 10, 2018 – Mar 26, 2019
(Argentina) Carlos Ramacciotti	Mar 31, 2019 – Nov 18, 2019
(Peru) Wilmar Valencia	Feb 1, 2020 –
