= 2015 in Peruvian football =

Football in Peru
- Season: 2015

Men's football
- Torneo Descentralizado: FBC Melgar
- Segunda División: Comerciantes Unidos
- Copa Perú: Defensor La Bocana

The 2015 season in Peruvian football included all the matches of the different national male and female teams, as well as the local club tournaments, and the participation of these in international competitions in which representatives of the country's teams had participated.

== National teams ==
=== Peru national football team ===
==== 2018 FIFA World Cup qualification ====
8 October 2018 FIFA World Cup qualification	Colombia	2–0	Peru	Barranquilla
15:30 COT (UTC−5)	Gutiérrez 36'; Cardona 90+4'	Report		Stadium: Estadio Metropolitano Roberto Meléndez; Attendance: 44,000; Referee: Antonio Arias (PAR)

13 October 2018 FIFA World Cup qualification	Peru	3–4	Chile	Lima
21:15 PET (UTC−5)	Farfán 10', 36' (pen.); Guerrero 90+2'	Report	Sánchez 7', 44'; Vargas 41', 49'	Stadium: Estadio Nacional; Attendance: 39,180; Referee: Néstor Pitana (ARG)

13 November 2018 FIFA World Cup qualification	Peru	1–0	Paraguay	Lima
21:15 PET (UTC−5)	Farfán 20'	Report		Stadium: Estadio Nacional; Attendance: 26,000; Referee: Julio Bascuñán (CHI)

17 November 2018 FIFA World Cup qualification	Brazil	3–0	Peru	Salvador
21:00 BRT (UTC−3)	Douglas Costa 22'; Renato Augusto 57'; Filipe Luís 77'	Report		Stadium: Arena Fonte Nova; Attendance: 45,000; Referee: Hernando Buitrago (COL)

==== Copa América ====
Squad

Head coach: (Argentina) Ricardo Gareca

No.	Pos.	Player	Date of birth (age)	Caps	Goals	Club
1	GK	Pedro Gallese	23 February 1990 (aged 25)	6	0	(Peruvian Football Federation) Juan Aurich
2	DF	Jair Céspedes	22 May 1984 (aged 31)	4	0	(Peruvian Football Federation) Juan Aurich
3	DF	Hansell Riojas	15 October 1991 (aged 23)	3	0	(Peruvian Football Federation) Universidad César Vallejo
4	DF	Pedro Requena	24 January 1991 (aged 24)	2	0	(Peruvian Football Federation) Universidad César Vallejo
5	DF	Carlos Zambrano	10 July 1989 (aged 25)	29	4	(German Football Association) Eintracht Frankfurt
6	MF	Juan Manuel Vargas	5 October 1983 (aged 31)	53	4	(Italian Football Federation) Fiorentina
7	MF	Paolo Hurtado	27 July 1990 (aged 24)	15	2	(Portuguese Football Federation) Paços de Ferreira
8	MF	Christian Cueva	23 November 1991 (aged 23)	7	0	(Peruvian Football Federation) Alianza Lima
9	FW	Paolo Guerrero	1 January 1984 (aged 31)	56	21	(Brazilian Football Confederation) Corinthians
10	FW	Jefferson Farfán	26 October 1984 (aged 30)	64	17	(German Football Association) Schalke 04
11	FW	Yordy Reyna	17 September 1993 (aged 21)	8	2	(German Football Association) RB Leipzig
12	GK	Diego Penny	22 April 1984 (aged 31)	14	0	(Peruvian Football Federation) Sporting Cristal
13	MF	Edwin Retamoso	23 February 1982 (aged 33)	11	0	(Peruvian Football Federation) Real Garcilaso
14	FW	Claudio Pizarro (captain)	3 October 1978 (aged 36)	76	19	(German Football Association) Bayern Munich
15	DF	Christian Ramos	4 November 1988 (aged 26)	39	1	(Peruvian Football Federation) Juan Aurich
16	MF	Carlos Lobatón	6 February 1980 (aged 35)	33	1	(Peruvian Football Federation) Sporting Cristal
17	DF	Luis Advíncula	2 March 1990 (aged 25)	41	0	(Portuguese Football Federation) Vitória de Setúbal
18	FW	André Carrillo	14 June 1991 (aged 23)	23	1	(Portuguese Football Federation) Sporting CP
19	DF	Yoshimar Yotún	7 April 1990 (aged 25)	39	1	(Swedish Football Association) Malmö FF
20	MF	Joel Sánchez	11 June 1989 (aged 26)	2	0	(Peruvian Football Federation) Universidad San Martín
21	MF	Josepmir Ballón	21 March 1988 (aged 27)	35	0	(Peruvian Football Federation) Sporting Cristal
22	MF	Carlos Ascues	6 June 1992 (aged 23)	6	5	(Peruvian Football Federation) Melgar
23	GK	Salomón Libman	25 February 1984 (aged 31)	6	0	(Peruvian Football Federation) Universidad César Vallejo

Group stage

14 June Copa América Group C	Brazil	2–1	Peru	Temuco
18:30 CLT (UTC−4)	Neymar 4'; Douglas Costa 90+1'	Report	Cueva 2'	Stadium: Estadio Municipal Germán Becker; Attendance: 16,342; Referee: Roberto García Orozco (MEX)

18 June Copa América Group C	Peru	1–0	Venezuela	Valparaíso
20:30 CLT (UTC−4)	Pizarro 72'	Report		Stadium: Estadio Elías Figueroa; Attendance: 15,542; Referee: Raúl Orosco (BOL)

21 June Copa América Group C	Colombia	0–0	Peru	Temuco
16:00 CLT (UTC−4)		Report		Stadium: Estadio Municipal Germán Becker; Attendance: 17,231; Referee: Néstor Pitana (ARG)

Quarter-finals

25 June Copa América Quarter-finals	Bolivia	1–3	Peru	Temuco
20:30 CLT (UTC−4)	Martins 83' (pen.)	Report	Guerrero 19', 22', 73'	Stadium: Estadio Municipal Germán Becker; Attendance: 16,872; Referee: Wilmar Roldán (COL)

Semi-finals

25 June Copa América Quarter-finals	Bolivia	1–3	Peru	Temuco
20:30 CLT (UTC−4)	Martins 83' (pen.)	Report	Guerrero 19', 22', 73'	Stadium: Estadio Municipal Germán Becker; Attendance: 16,872; Referee: Wilmar Roldán (COL)

Third place playoff

3 July Copa América Third place playoff	Peru	2–0	Paraguay	Concepción
20:30 CLT (UTC−4)	Carrillo 48'; Guerrero 89'	Report		Stadium: Estadio Municipal de Concepción; Attendance: 29,143; Referee: Raúl Orosco (BOL)

=== Peru national under-20 football team ===
==== South American U-20 Championship ====
Squad

Coach: Víctor Rivera (Peru)

No.	Pos.	Player	Date of birth (age)	Club
1	GK	Carlos Grados	15 May 1995 (aged 19)	(Peruvian Football Federation) Sporting Cristal
2	DF	Luis Abram	27 February 1996 (aged 18)	(Peruvian Football Federation) Sporting Cristal
3	DF	Brian Bernaola	17 January 1995 (aged 19)	(Peruvian Football Federation) Sporting Cristal
4	DF	Aldair Ramos	12 August 1995 (aged 19)	(Peruvian Football Federation) Alianza Lima
5	DF	Francisco Duclós	29 January 1996 (aged 18)	(Royal Spanish Football Federation) Celta Vigo B
6	DF	Alexis Cossio	11 February 1995 (aged 19)	(Peruvian Football Federation) Sporting Cristal
7	DF	Fernando Canales	13 April 1995 (aged 19)	(Peruvian Football Federation) Alianza Lima
8	MF	Renzo Garcés	12 June 1996 (aged 18)	(Peruvian Football Federation) Universidad San Martín
9	FW	Alexander Succar	12 August 1995 (aged 19)	(Peruvian Football Federation) Sporting Cristal
10	MF	Sergio Peña	28 September 1995 (aged 19)	(Royal Spanish Football Federation) Granada B
11	FW	Aurelio Gonzales-Vigil	1 March 1996 (aged 18)	(Peruvian Football Federation) Melgar
12	GK	Daniel Prieto	19 September 1995 (aged 19)	(Peruvian Football Federation) Alianza Lima
13	DF	Diego Zurek	25 May 1996 (aged 18)	(Peruvian Football Federation) Universidad San Martín
14	MF	Pedro Aquino	13 April 1995 (aged 19)	(Peruvian Football Federation) Sporting Cristal
15	DF	Jeremy Rostaing	3 May 1995 (aged 19)	(Peruvian Football Federation) Universidad César Vallejo
16	DF	Aldair Perleche	4 June 1995 (aged 19)	(Peruvian Football Federation) Juan Aurich
17	FW	Beto da Silva	28 December 1996 (aged 18)	(Peruvian Football Federation) Sporting Cristal
18	DF	Andy Reátegui	14 June 1995 (aged 19)	(Peruvian Football Federation) Universitario de Deportes
19	FW	Adrián Ugarriza	1 January 1997 (aged 18)	(Peruvian Football Federation) Universidad San Martín
20	MF	Enmanuel Páucar	9 August 1996 (aged 18)	(Peruvian Football Federation) Universitario de Deportes
21	GK	Karlo Sánchez	21 March 1995 (aged 19)	(Peruvian Football Federation) Unión Huaral
22	MF	Miguel Carranza	3 November 1995 (aged 19)	(Peruvian Football Federation) Unión Comercio
23	FW	Roberto Siucho	7 February 1997 (aged 17)	(Peruvian Football Federation) Universitario de Deportes

Fist stage

16 January 2015	Ecuador	0–2	Peru	Estadio Suppici, Colonia
22:10		Report	Succar 46', 76'	Referee: Julio Bascuñán (Chile)

18 January 2015	Argentina	6–2	Peru	Estadio Suppici, Colonia
20:00	Prieto 23' (o.g.); Bernaola 28' (o.g.); Correa 32'; Simeone 41', 89'; Suárez 78'	Report	Gonzales-Vigil 73'; Da Silva 73'	Referee: Andrés Cunha (Uruguay)

20 January 2015	Bolivia	0–1	Peru	Estadio Suppici, Colonia
22:10		Report	Da Silva 68'	Referee: Adrián Vélez (Colombia)

22 January 2015	Paraguay	1–1	Peru	Estadio Suppici, Colonia
22:10	Amarilla 29'	Report	Succar 23'	Referee: Julio Bascuñán (Chile)

Final stage

26 January 2015	Argentina	2–0	Peru	Estadio Centenario, Montevideo
17:50	Simeone 1'; Correa 77'	Report		Referee: Enrique Cáceres (Paraguay)

29 January 2015	Uruguay	3–1	Peru	Estadio Gran Parque Central, Montevideo
22:10	Acosta 27'; Pereiro 55'; Arambarri 77'	Report	Ugarriza 66'	Referee: Mauro Vigliano (Argentina)

1 February 2015	Peru	1–3	Colombia	Estadio Gran Parque Central, Montevideo
17:50	Succar 23'	Report	Lucumí 25', 90'; Borré 40'	Referee: José Argote (Venezuela)

4 February 2015	Peru	0–5	Brazil	Estadio Centenario, Montevideo
17:50		Report	Nathan 47'; Thalles 56', 62'; Malcom 71'; Léo Pereira 81'	Referee: Adrián Vélez (Colombia)

7 February 2015	Paraguay	1–3	Peru	Estadio Centenario, Montevideo
17:50	Díaz 84'	Report	Peña 5'; Cossio 10'; Ugarriza 23'	Referee: Mauro Vigliano (Argentina)

=== Peru women's national under-20 football team ===
==== South American U-20 Championship ====
First stage

19 November 2015	Paraguay	3–2	Peru	Estádio Ulrico Mursa, Santos
17:00	Bravo 29' (o.g.); Martínez 32'; Godoy 80'	Report	Quesada 15'; Cisneros 19'	Referee: María Victoria Daza (Colombia)

21 November 2015	Peru	1–2	Chile	Estádio Ulrico Mursa, Santos
19:10	Ramos 89'	Report	Ponce 77'; Lara 81'	Referee: Susana Corella (Ecuador)

25 November 2015	Venezuela	3–1	Peru	Estádio Ulrico Mursa, Santos
19:10	Zambrano 9'; García 45+1'; Cañas 55'	Report	Ramos 77'	Referee: Sirley Cornejo (Bolivia)

27 November 2015	Brazil	4–0	Peru	Estádio Urbano Caldeira, Santos
19:10	Kélen 17'; Jennifer 29'; Geyse 54', 67'	Report		Referee: Nadia Fuques (Uruguay)

=== Peru national under-17 football team ===
==== South American U-17 Championship ====
Fist stage

7 March 2015	Venezuela	2–2	Peru	Estadio Deportivo Capiatá, Capiatá
18:00	Farisato 14'; Chacón 54'	Report	Iberico 59', 60'	Referee: Gery Vargas (Bolivia)

9 March 2015	Colombia	4–2	Peru	Estadio Deportivo Capiatá, Capiatá
18:00	Bolaños 10'; Valdeblánquez 35'; D. Pérez 47' (pen.); Cuesta 50'	Report	Iberico 40' (pen.), 69'	Referee: Roberto Tobar (Chile)

11 March 2015	Paraguay	2–0	Peru	Estadio Dr. Nicolás Léoz, Asunción
20:10	R. Ferreira 20'; S. Ferreira 81'	Report		Referee: Jonhatan Fuentes (Uruguay)

13 March 2015	Brazil	3–0	Peru	Estadio Feliciano Cáceres, Luque
18:00	Leandrinho 59', 63', 82'	Report		Referee: Gery Vargas (Bolivia)

=== Peru national under-15 football team ===
==== South American U-15 Championship ====
Fist stage

22 November 2015
14:30

Uruguay	4–0	Peru
Torres (?); Rodríguez (?)	Report

Estadio Municipal de Montería, Montería
Referee: Gustavo Murillo (Colombia)
24 November 2015
14:30

Peru	0–3	Bolivia
	Report	Melgar (?); García (?)

Estadio Municipal de Montería, Montería
Referee: José Hoyo (Venezuela)
26 November 2015
14:30

Peru	1–6	Brazil
Valverde (?)	Report	Paulinho 17', 32'; Vinicius 50', 90+2'; Vitinho 55' (pen.); Vinícius Jr. 76'

Estadio Municipal de Montería, Montería
Referee: Gustavo Murillo (Colombia)
28 November 2015
16:45

Chile	1–3	Peru
Vega 53'	Report	Bolívar 6'; Huacho 20'; Gallardo 41'

Estadio Municipal de Montería, Montería
Referee: José Hoyo (Venezuela)

== Peruvian clubs in international competitions ==
=== Men's football ===
Team	2015 Copa Libertadores	2015 Copa Sudamericana
Sporting Cristal	Group Stage	N/A
Juan Aurich	Group Stage	N/A
Alianza Lima	First stage	N/A
León de Huánuco	N/A	First stage
Universitario	N/A	Second stage
FBC Melgar	N/A	First stage
Unión Comercio	N/A	First stage

=== Women's football ===
Team	2015 Copa Libertadores Femenina
Universitario	Group Stage

== Torneo Descentralizado ==
=== Torneo del Inca ===
==== Group Stage ====
Group A

Pos	Team	Pld	W	D	L	GF	GA	GD	Pts	Qualification	USM	CRI	MEL	CIE	MUN	JUA
1	Universidad San Martín	10	6	1	3	12	7	+5	19	Advance to Semi-finals	—	3–0	1–0	2–1	0–0	1–0
2	Sporting Cristal	10	6	0	4	15	11	+4	18		2–1	—	2–0	1–0	1–0	0–2
3	Melgar	10	6	0	4	14	15	−1	18		3–2	2–1	—	3–1	3–1	2–1
4	Cienciano	10	4	2	4	10	8	+2	14		1–0	1–0	3–0	—	0–0	2–0
5	Deportivo Municipal	10	2	3	5	6	16	−10	9		0–1	0–5	2–0	1–0	—	1–1
6	Juan Aurich	10	2	2	6	12	13	−1	8		0–1	2–3	0–1	1–1	5–1	—

Updated to match(es) played on unknown. Source: ADFP - official fixture

Group B

Pos	Team	Pld	W	D	L	GF	GA	GD	Pts	Qualification	UCV	GAR	LEO	AAS	UNI	UTC
1	Universidad César Vallejo	10	8	0	2	24	11	+13	24	Advance to Semi-finals	—	4–0	3–1	1–2	2–1	4–1
2	Real Garcilaso	10	7	1	2	19	10	+9	22	Advance to Semi-finals	3–1	—	0–0	1–0	4–0	3–1
3	León de Huánuco	10	5	1	4	14	12	+2	16		1–3	1–2	—	2–1	2–1	2–0
4	Alianza Atlético	10	3	0	7	12	17	−5	9		2–3	1–2	0–2	—	2–1	4–0
5	Universitario	10	3	0	7	10	17	−7	9		0–1	1–4	1–0	3–0	—	2–1
6	UTC	10	3	0	7	8	20	−12	9		0–2	1–0	1–3	2–0	1–0	—

Updated to match(es) played on unknown. Source: ADFP - official fixture

Group C

Pos	Team	Pld	W	D	L	GF	GA	GD	Pts	Qualification	ALI	SHU	UCO	AYA	SLO
1	Alianza Lima	8	5	1	2	16	7	+9	16	Advance to Semi-finals	—	2–0	0–0	3–1	4–0
2	Sport Huancayo	8	5	1	2	10	7	+3	16		2–1	—	2–0	1–1	1–0
3	Unión Comercio	8	4	3	1	13	8	+5	15		3–2	1–0	—	4–1	4–2
4	Ayacucho	8	1	2	5	11	18	−7	5	Starts Apertura with -1 point	1–3	1–2	1–1	—	4–0
5	Sport Loreto	8	1	1	6	7	17	−10	4	Starts Apertura with -2 points	0–1	1–2	0–0	4–1	—

Updated to match(es) played on unknown. Source: ADFP - official fixture

Ranking of second place teams

Grp	Team	Pts	Pld	PPG	Qualification
B	Real Garcilaso	22	10	2.2	Advance to Semi-finals
C	Sport Huancayo	16	8	2	
A	Sporting Cristal	18	10	1.8	

==== Semifinals ====
April 11, 2015
15:00

Real Garcilaso	2–0	Universidad César Vallejo
Hugo Souza 36'; Carlos Flores 86'

Garcilaso, Cusco
Referee: Henry Gambetta
April 19, 2015
15:00

Universidad César Vallejo	2–0	Real Garcilaso
Donald Millán 45+1'; Hansell Riojas 87'
Penalties
Emiliano Ciucci (penalty scored); Junior Viza (penalty scored); Juan Morales (penalty scored); Daniel Chávez (penalty scored); Donald Millán (penalty scored)	5-4	(penalty scored) Alfredo Ramúa; (penalty scored) Ramón Rodríguez; (penalty missed) Walter Vílchez; (penalty scored) Marcio Valverde; (penalty scored) Hugo Souza

Mansiche, Trujillo
Referee: Luis Garay

April 12, 2015
16:00

Alianza Lima	2–1	Universidad San Martín
Marcos Miers 11'; Mauro Guevgeozián 74'		46' Aldo Corzo

Alejandro Villanueva, Lima
Referee: Manuel Garay
April 18, 2015
15:00

Universidad San Martín	3–3	Alianza Lima
Alejandro Hohberg 43' 90'; Federico Freire 82'		73' Roberto Guizasola; 78' Gabriel Costa; 90+4' Josimar Atoche

Miguel Grau, Callao
Referee: Diego Haro

==== Final ====
April 26, 2015
18:00

Alianza Lima	1–3	Universidad César Vallejo
Marcos Miers 20'	Report	38' Mauricio Montes; 74' Victor Cedron; 86' Daniel Chavez

Nacional, Lima
Attendance: 35 320
Referee: Henry Gambetta

Universidad César Vallejo won the cup after defeating Alianza Lima.

=== Torneo Apertura ===
Pos	Team	Pld	W	D	L	GF	GA	GD	Pts	Qualification
1	Sporting Cristal	16	9	4	3	25	16	+9	31	Advance to playoffs
2	Melgar	16	8	6	2	22	11	+11	30	
3	Deportivo Municipal	16	7	7	2	19	13	+6	28	
4	Real Garcilaso	16	8	4	4	22	20	+2	28	
5	Alianza Lima	16	8	2	6	20	14	+6	26	
6	Unión Comercio	16	7	5	4	21	19	+2	26	
7	Universidad César Vallejo	16	6	6	4	24	20	+4	24	
8	Juan Aurich	16	6	4	6	24	18	+6	22	
9	Sport Huancayo	16	5	7	4	19	17	+2	22	
10	Alianza Atlético	16	6	3	7	19	20	−1	21	
11	Cienciano	16	5	4	7	23	23	0	19	
12	León de Huánuco	16	5	3	8	21	28	−7	18	
13	Sport Loreto	16	4	5	7	14	18	−4	17	
14	Universitario	16	3	6	7	10	17	−7	15	
15	Ayacucho	16	4	3	9	15	25	−10	15	
16	UTC	16	3	5	8	21	31	−10	14	
17	Universidad San Martín	16	3	4	9	14	23	−9	13	

Updated to match(es) played on unknown. Source:

=== Torneo Clausura ===
Pos	Team	Pld	W	D	L	GF	GA	GD	Pts	Qualification
1	Melgar	16	8	5	3	29	11	+18	29	Advance to playoffs
2	Real Garcilaso	16	8	5	3	26	16	+10	29	
3	Sport Huancayo	16	8	4	4	28	20	+8	28	
4	Universitario	16	8	4	4	26	20	+6	28	
5	Sporting Cristal	16	7	6	3	35	24	+11	27	
6	Universidad César Vallejo	16	8	3	5	18	20	−2	27	
7	Universidad San Martín	16	7	3	6	17	17	0	24	
8	UTC	16	6	5	5	18	15	+3	23	
9	Juan Aurich	16	5	4	7	22	25	−3	19	
10	Ayacucho	16	5	4	7	22	26	−4	19	
11	Cienciano	16	4	6	6	16	19	−3	18	
12	Unión Comercio	16	5	3	8	27	32	−5	18	
13	Deportivo Municipal	16	4	6	6	13	22	−9	18	
14	Alianza Lima	16	4	5	7	18	21	−3	17	
15	Alianza Atlético	16	4	4	8	20	29	−9	16	
16	León de Huánuco	16	3	6	7	21	31	−10	15	
17	Sport Loreto	16	3	5	8	13	21	−8	14	

Updated to match(es) played on unknown. Source:

=== Semi-finals ===
December 6, 2015
13:00
First Leg

Melgar	1–0	Real Garcilaso
Zúñiga 89' (pen.)

Virgen de Chapi, Arequipa
Attendance: 31,806
Referee: Diego Haro
December 9, 2015
15:30
Second Leg

Real Garcilaso	0–4	Melgar
		7' Arias; 22' 74' 83' Cuesta

Garcilaso, Cusco
Attendance: 12,350
Referee: Michael Espinoza

December 9, 2015
13:00
Second Leg

Universidad César Vallejo	4–3	Sporting Cristal
Millán 12' 79'; Ciucci 34'; Silva 88'		31' (o.g.) Cardoza; 47' Ávila; 51' Luiz da Silva

Mansiche, Trujillo
Attendance: 9,284
Referee: Manuel Garay
December 6, 2015
15:30
First Leg

Sporting Cristal	3–1	Universidad César Vallejo
Revoredo 26' 54'; Luiz da Silva 87'		24' Chávez

Alberto Gallardo, Lima
Attendance: 7,018
Referee: Luis Seminario

=== Third place play-off ===
December 12, 2015
15:30

Real Garcilaso	1–0	Universidad César Vallejo
Correa 20'

Garcilaso, Cusco
Attendance: 719
Referee: Luis Seminario
December 15, 2015
15:30

Universidad César Vallejo	3–0	Real Garcilaso
Montes 20'; Millán 84'; Cobelli 88'

Mansiche, Trujillo
Attendance: 2,453
Referee: Manuel Garay

=== Final ===
December 13, 2015
15:30
First Leg

Sporting Cristal	2–2	Melgar
Quina 43' (o.g.); Sheput 52' (pen.)		40' Uribe; 87' Quina

Nacional, Lima
Attendance: 21,955
Referee: Diego Haro

December 16, 2015
15:30
Second Leg

Melgar	3–2	Sporting Cristal
Zúñiga 22'; Fernández (44.); Cuesta 90'		16' Da Silva; 71' (pen.) Blanco

Virgen de Chapi, Arequipa
Attendance: 35,565
Referee: Luis Garay

FBC Melgar won the cup after defeating Sporting Cristal.

== Segunda División ==
Pos	Team	Pld	W	D	L	GF	GA	GD	Pts	Promotion or relegation
1	Comerciantes Unidos	22	14	3	5	45	34	+11	43 (Note: Comerciantes Unidos was docked a total of 2 points for outstanding debts with the SAFAP.)	2016 Torneo Descentralizado
2	Los Caimanes	22	12	5	5	34	26	+8	41	
3	Atlético Torino	22	11	4	7	30	24	+6	35 (Note: Torino was docked a total of 2 points for outstanding debts with the SAFAP.)	
4	Willy Serrato	22	9	7	6	30	27	+3	34	
5	Deportivo Coopsol	22	10	4	8	34	28	+6	34	
6	Alianza Universidad	22	8	7	7	36	24	+12	31	
7	Sport Boys	22	10	4	8	36	24	+12	30 (Note: Sport Boys was docked a total of 4 points for outstanding debts with the SAFAP.)	
8	Unión Huaral	22	9	3	10	26	26	0	30	
9	Sport Victoria	22	5	8	9	28	31	−3	23	
10	Carlos A. Mannucci	22	5	8	9	24	32	−8	21 (Note: Carlos A. Mannucci was docked a total of 2 points for outstanding debts with the SAFAP.)	
11	Atlético Minero	22	3	6	13	15	39	−24	15	2016 Copa Perú
12	San Simón	22	4	5	13	14	39	−25	9 (Note: San Simón was docked a total of 8 points for outstanding debts with the SAFAP and was disabled and relegated to the Copa Perú.)	2016 Copa Perú

Updated to match(es) played on 2015. Source: ADFP-SD - official site
Rules for classification: 1) points; 2) goal difference; 3) number of goals scored; 4) head-to-head record; 5) drawing of lots

== See also ==
- 2015 FBC Melgar season
