= 2015 Torneo del Inca =

Copa Inca
- Season: 2015
- Dates: 6 February 2015 – 26 April 2015
- Champions: Universidad César Vallejo (first title)
- Matches: 85
- Goals: 229 (2.69 per match)

The 2015 Torneo del Inca is the third season of the Torneo del Inca, the first football tournament of the 2015 season of Peruvian football. All 17 teams of the first division compete in this tournament and the winner of the tournament advances to the playoffs of the 2015 Torneo Descentralizado.

== Teams ==
=== Stadia and locations ===
Locations of the 2015 Primera División teams

Team	City	Stadium	Capacity
Alianza Atlético	Sullana	Miguel Grau (Piura)	25,000
Alianza Lima	Lima	Alejandro Villanueva	35,000
Ayacucho	Ayacucho	Ciudad de Cumaná	15,000
Cienciano	Cusco	Garcilaso	40,000
Deportivo Municipal	Lima	Iván Elías Moreno	10,000
Juan Aurich	Chiclayo	Elías Aguirre	24,500
León de Huánuco	Huánuco	Heraclio Tapia	15,000
Melgar	Arequipa	Virgen de Chapi	40,217
Real Garcilaso	Cusco	Garcilaso	40,000
Sport Huancayo	Huancayo	Estadio Huancayo	20,000
Sport Loreto	Pucallpa	Aliardo Soria	25,000
Sporting Cristal	Lima	Alberto Gallardo	18,000
Unión Comercio	Nueva Cajamarca	IPD de Moyobamba	5,000
Universidad César Vallejo	Trujillo	Mansiche	25,000
Universidad San Martín	Lima	Alberto Gallardo	18,000
UTC	Cajamarca	Héroes de San Ramón	18,000
Universitario	Lima	Monumental	80,093

== Draw ==
The 17 teams were organized into four pots based on historical influence and geographic regions and were to be drawn into the three groups. The first pot contained the Big 3, the second and third pots contained teams which play in cities that are substantially above sea level, and the final pot contained the remaining teams which were not part of the first three pots.

Pot 1 (Seeds)	Pot 2 (Above sea level teams)	Pot 3 (Above sea level teams)	Pot 4
Alianza Lima; Sporting Cristal; Universitario	Real Garcilaso; Cienciano; Sport Huancayo	Melgar; Ayacucho; UTC	Alianza Atlético; Universidad San Martín; Juan Aurich Universidad César Vallejo; León de Huánuco; Unión Comercio Deportivo Municipal; Sport Loreto

== Group stage ==
=== Group A ===
Pos	Team	Pld	W	D	L	GF	GA	GD	Pts	Qualification	USM	CRI	MEL	CIE	MUN	JUA
1	Universidad San Martín	10	6	1	3	12	7	+5	19	Advance to Semi-finals		3–0	1–0	2–1	0–0	1–0
2	Sporting Cristal	10	6	0	4	15	11	+4	18		2–1		2–0	1–0	1–0	0–2
3	Melgar	10	6	0	4	14	15	−1	18		3–2	2–1		3–1	3–1	2–1
4	Cienciano	10	4	2	4	10	8	+2	14		1–0	1–0	3–0		0–0	2–0
5	Deportivo Municipal	10	2	3	5	6	16	−10	9		0–1	0–5	2–0	1–0		1–1
6	Juan Aurich	10	2	2	6	12	13	−1	8		0–1	2–3	0–1	1–1	5–1	

Updated to match(es) played on unknown. Source: ADFP - official fixture

=== Group B ===
Pos	Team	Pld	W	D	L	GF	GA	GD	Pts	Qualification	UCV	GAR	LEO	AAS	UNI	UTC
1	Universidad César Vallejo	10	8	0	2	24	11	+13	24	Advance to Semi-finals		4–0	3–1	1–2	2–1	4–1
2	Real Garcilaso	10	7	1	2	19	10	+9	22	Advance to Semi-finals	3–1		0–0	1–0	4–0	3–1
3	León de Huánuco	10	5	1	4	14	12	+2	16		1–3	1–2		2–1	2–1	2–0
4	Alianza Atlético	10	3	0	7	12	17	−5	9		2–3	1–2	0–2		2–1	4–0
5	Universitario	10	3	0	7	10	17	−7	9		0–1	1–4	1–0	3–0		2–1
6	UTC	10	3	0	7	8	20	−12	9		0–2	1–0	1–3	2–0	1–0	

Updated to match(es) played on unknown. Source: ADFP - official fixture

=== Group C ===
Pos	Team	Pld	W	D	L	GF	GA	GD	Pts	Qualification	ALI	SHU	UCO	AYA	SLO
1	Alianza Lima	8	5	1	2	16	7	+9	16	Advance to Semi-finals		2–0	0–0	3–1	4–0
2	Sport Huancayo	8	5	1	2	10	7	+3	16		2–1		2–0	1–1	1–0
3	Unión Comercio	8	4	3	1	13	8	+5	15		3–2	1–0		4–1	4–2
4	Ayacucho	8	1	2	5	11	18	−7	5	Starts Apertura with -1 point	1–3	1–2	1–1		4–0
5	Sport Loreto	8	1	1	6	7	17	−10	4	Starts Apertura with -2 points	0–1	1–2	0–0	4–1	

Updated to match(es) played on unknown. Source: ADFP - official fixture

=== Ranking of second place teams ===
The second place teams will be ranked based on points per game.

Grp	Team	Pts	Pld	PPG	Qualification
B	Real Garcilaso	22	10	2.2	Advance to Semi-finals
C	Sport Huancayo	16	8	2	
A	Sporting Cristal	18	10	1.8	

== Final phase ==
=== Bracket ===
Semi-finals
Universidad San Martín	1	3	4
Alianza Lima	2	3	5
Universidad César Vallejo	0	2	2 (5)
Real Garcilaso	2	0	2 (4)

Final
Alianza Lima	1
Universidad César Vallejo	3

=== Semi-finals ===
The semi-finals was played by the three group winners and the second place team with the best points-per-game average.

==== First leg ====
April 11, 2015
15:00

Real Garcilaso	2–0	Universidad César Vallejo
Hugo Souza 36'; Carlos Flores 86'

Garcilaso, Cusco
Referee: Henry Gambetta
April 12, 2015
16:00

Alianza Lima	2–1	Universidad San Martín
Marcos Miers 11'; Mauro Guevgeozián 74'		46' Aldo Corzo

Alejandro Villanueva, Lima
Referee: Manuel Garay

==== Second leg ====
April 18, 2015
15:00

Universidad San Martín	3–3	Alianza Lima
Alejandro Hohberg 43' 90'; Federico Freire 82'		73' Roberto Guizasola; 78' Gabriel Costa; 90+4' Josimar Atoche

Miguel Grau, Callao
Referee: Diego Haro
April 19, 2015
15:00

Universidad César Vallejo	2–0	Real Garcilaso
Donald Millán 45+1'; Hansell Riojas 87'
Penalties
Emiliano Ciucci (penalty scored); Junior Viza (penalty scored); Juan Morales (penalty scored); Daniel Chávez (penalty scored); Donald Millán (penalty scored)	5–4	(penalty scored) Alfredo Ramúa; (penalty scored) Ramón Rodríguez; (penalty missed) Walter Vílchez; (penalty scored) Marcio Valverde; (penalty scored) Hugo Souza

Mansiche, Trujillo
Referee: Luis Garay

Tied 2-2 on aggregate. Universidad César Vallejo win 5-4 on penalties.

=== Final ===
The final was played in the Estadio Nacional in Lima.

April 26, 2015
18:00

Alianza Lima	1–3	Universidad César Vallejo
Marcos Miers 20'	Report	38' Mauricio Montes; 74' Victor Cedron; 86' Daniel Chavez

Nacional, Lima
Attendance: 35 320
Referee: Henry Gambetta

== See also ==
- 2015 Torneo Descentralizado
- 2015 Torneo de Promoción y Reserva
- 2015 in Peruvian football
