= 2015 FBC Melgar season =

FBC Melgar
2015 season
- Manager: Juan Reynoso (All Season)
- Stadium: Monumental Virgen de Chapi
- Torneo Descentralizado: Torneo Apertura: Second (2°); Torneo Clausura: First (1°) Champion; Aggregate Table: First (1°); Play-offs: Champion National
- Torneo del Inca: Group stage (Third 3° Group A)
- Copa Sudamericana: First Stage
- Top goalscorer: League: Ysrael Zuñiga (16); All: Ysrael Zuñiga (19); Omar Fernández (17); Bernardo Cuesta (14)
- Biggest win: 5–0 vs León de Huánuco Torneo Clausura Match 2 (3 September 2015, Home); 5–1 vs Cienciano Torneo Clausura Match 12 (28 October 2015, Home)
- Biggest defeat: 5–0 vs Junior Copa Sudamericana First Stage First leg (12 August 2015, Away)
Home colours	Away colours	Third colours

The 2015 FBC Melgar season were the One-Hundred-First (101.º) of the club from its foundation in 1915, Forty-Six (46) participations in the top-flight of Peruvian Primera División (of 99 Editions) with denomination Torneo Descentralizado. In Previous Season the club qualified as 1st Place agregated of the 2014 Torneo Descentralizado.

Melgar were a of sixteen (16) clubs in the Fiftieth edition (50.º) Torneo Descentralizado, the competition most important of the Peruvian football. The club played the Peruvian Primera División, the Torneo del Inca and the Copa Sudamericana for Second (2nd) Time. FBC Melgar won their 2nd Torneo Descentralizado Title.

== Torneo del Inca ==
Group stage (Group A)

Pos	Team	Pld	W	D	L	GF	GA	GD	Pts	Qualification	USM	CRI	MEL	CIE	MUN	JUA
1	Universidad San Martín	10	6	1	3	12	7	+5	19	Advance to Semi-finals	—	—	1–0	—	—	—
2	Sporting Cristal	10	6	0	4	15	11	+4	18		—	—	2–0	—	—	—
3	Melgar	10	6	0	4	14	15	−1	18		3–2	2–1	—	3–1	3–1	2–1
4	Cienciano	10	4	2	4	10	8	+2	14		—	—	3–0	—	—	—
5	Deportivo Municipal	10	2	3	5	6	16	−10	9		—	—	2–0	—	—	—
6	Juan Aurich	10	2	2	6	12	13	−1	8		—	—	0–1	—	—	—

Updated to match(es) played on unknown. Source: ADFP - official fixture

== Torneo Descentralizado ==
=== Torneo Apertura ===
Pos	Team	Pld	W	D	L	GF	GA	GD	Pts
1	Sporting Cristal	16	9	4	3	25	16	+9	31
2	Melgar	16	8	6	2	22	11	+11	30
3	Deportivo Municipal	16	7	7	2	19	13	+6	28

==== Results ====
Home \ Away	AAS	ALI	CIE	MUN	AYA	JA	LEÓ	MEL	RGA	CRI	SHU	LOR	UCO	UCV	USM	UTC	UNI
Alianza Atlético																	
Alianza Lima																	
Cienciano								1–3									
Deportivo Municipal								1–1									
Ayacucho																	
Juan Aurich								2–3									
León de Huánuco								0–3									
Melgar	2–1	3–1			1–0					0–0	1–0	2–2		2–0	1–1		
Real Garcilaso								1–0									
Sporting Cristal																	
Sport Huancayo																	
Sport Loreto																	
Unión Comercio								1–0									
Universidad César Vallejo																	
Universidad San Martín																	
UTC								0–0									
Universitario								0–0									

Updated to match(es) played on February 2015. Source: ADFP - official fixture
Legend: Blue = home team win; Yellow = draw; Red = away team win.

=== Torneo Clausura ===
Pos	Team	Pld	W	D	L	GF	GA	GD	Pts	Qualification
1	Melgar	16	8	5	3	29	11	+18	29	Advance to playoffs
2	Real Garcilaso	16	8	5	3	26	16	+10	29	
3	Sport Huancayo	16	8	4	4	28	20	+8	28	

==== Results ====
Home \ Away	AAS	ALI	CIE	MUN	AYA	JA	LEÓ	MEL	RGA	CRI	SHU	LOR	UCO	UCV	USM	UTC	UNI
Alianza Atlético								0–0									
Alianza Lima								0–0									
Cienciano																	
Deportivo Municipal																	
Ayacucho								1–2									
Juan Aurich																	
León de Huánuco																	
Melgar			5–1	0–0		4–1	5–0		2–0				4–1			1–0	2–0
Real Garcilaso																	
Sporting Cristal								2–2									
Sport Huancayo								3–2									
Sport Loreto								0–0									
Unión Comercio																	
Universidad César Vallejo								1–0									
Universidad San Martín								1–0									
UTC																	
Universitario																	

Updated to match(es) played on February 2015. Source: ADFP - official fixture
Legend: Blue = home team win; Yellow = draw; Red = away team win.

==== Play-off Torneo Clausura ====
December 2, 2015 Clausura play-off	Melgar	1–1 (4–2 p)	Real Garcilaso	Miguel Grau, Callao
19:30	Gonzales Vigíl 68'		89' Rodríguez	Referee: Manuel Garay
	Penalties
	Schuler (penalty scored); Hinostroza (penalty scored); Palomino (penalty scored); Arce (penalty scored)		(penalty missed) Ramúa; (penalty scored) Aubert; (penalty scored) Rodríguez; (penalty missed) Carando

=== Play-offs ===
==== Semi-finals ====
December 6, 2015 First Leg	Melgar	1–0	Real Garcilaso	Virgen de Chapi, Arequipa
13:00	Zúñiga 89' (pen.)			Attendance: 31,806; Referee: Diego Haro

December 9, 2015 Second Leg	Real Garcilaso	0–4	Melgar	Garcilaso, Cusco
15:30			7' Arias; 22' 74' 83' Cuesta	Attendance: 12,350; Referee: Michael Espinoza

==== Final ====
FBC Melgar won the cup after defeating Sporting Cristal.

December 13, 2015 First Leg	Sporting Cristal	2–2	Melgar	Nacional, Lima
15:30	Quina 43' (o.g.); Sheput 52' (pen.)		40' Uribe; 87' Quina	Attendance: 21,955; Referee: Diego Haro

December 16, 2015 Second Leg	Melgar	3–2	Sporting Cristal	Virgen de Chapi, Arequipa
15:30	Zúñiga 22'; Fernández (44.); Cuesta 90'		16' Da Silva; 71' (pen.) Blanco	Attendance: 35,565; Referee: Luis Garay

== Copa Sudamericana ==
=== First stage ===
Junior won 5–4 on aggregate and advanced to the second stage.

August 12, 2015	Junior (Colombia)	5–0	(Peru) Melgar	Estadio Metropolitano Roberto Meléndez, Barranquilla
21:15 UTC−5	Barrera 22'; Pérez 28'; Ovelar 32'; Hernández 35'; Ortega 88'	Report		Referee: Fernando Falce (Uruguay)

August 18, 2015	Melgar (Peru)	4–0	(Colombia) Junior	Estadio Monumental Virgen de Chapi, Arequipa
16:30 UTC−5	Cuesta 4', 45'; Quina 74'; Acasiete 82'	Report		Referee: Patricio Polic (Chile)

== See also ==
- FBC Melgar
- 2015 Torneo Descentralizado
- 2015 Torneo del Inca
- 2015 Torneo de Promoción y Reservas
