= 2015 Torneo Descentralizado =

Torneo Descentralizado
- Season: 2015
- Dates: 1 May 2015 – 16 December 2015
- Champions: Melgar (2nd title)
- Relegated: Cienciano; Sport Loreto; León de Huánuco
- Copa Libertadores: Melgar; Sporting Cristal; Universidad César Vallejo
- Copa Sudamericana: Real Garcilaso; Sport Huancayo; Deportivo Municipal; Universitario
- Matches: 366
- Goals: 963 (2.63 per match)
- Top goalscorer: Lionard Pajoy (25 goals)
- Biggest home win: Sport Huancayo 5–3 Sporting Cristal
- Biggest away win: Real Garcilaso 0–4 Sporting Cristal; Real Garcilaso 0–4 Melgar
- Highest scoring: Sport Huancayo 5–3 Sporting Cristal
- Highest attendance: 38,710; Universitario v. Sporting Cristal; 23 Aug. 2015
- Lowest attendance: 236; Sport Huancayo v. Unión Comercio; 8 Aug. 2015
- Total attendance: 1,543,694
- Average attendance: 4,217

The 2015 Torneo Descentralizado de Fútbol Profesional (known as the 2015 Copa Movistar for sponsorship reasons) is the 99th season of the highest division of Peruvian football. A total of 17 teams have been confirmed to compete in the season after Alianza Atlético were reinstated in the first division following their relegation in 2011.

== Competition modus ==
The competition will be played with 17 teams after the restitution of Alianza Atlético's place in the first division. The championship will be divided into several stages.

| Tournament | Stage | Dates | Rounds |
|---|---|---|---|
| Torneo del Inca | Group stage | 6 February – 5 April | 10 |
| Torneo del Inca | Semi-finals | 11 – 19 April | 2 |
| Torneo del Inca | Final | 26 April | 1 |
| Torneo Apertura | Single stage | 1 May – 23 August | 17 |
| Torneo Clausura | Single stage | 30 August – 29 November | 17 |
| Playoffs | Semi-finals | Dates TBA | 2 |
| Playoffs | Third place match | Dates TBA | 2 |
| Playoffs | Finals | Dates TBA | 2 |

The first tournament to be played will be the 2015 Torneo del Inca—played by the 17 teams in 3 groups. Subsequently, the Torneo Apertura will have all teams play each other once either home or away while the Torneo Clausura will repeat those matches but reversing the home or away ground. The winners of these three tournaments will advance to the semi-finals of the playoff phase at the end of the season granted they each finish at least eighth in the aggregate table or above. The aggregate table will consist of the results of only the Torneo Apertura and Torneo Clausura. The fourth team to advance to the semi-finals will be the best placed team in the aggregate table that did not win any of the three tournaments.

Should one team win two of the three tournaments, they will automatically advance to the finals of the playoff phase and the semi-finals will be played by the team that won the remaining tournament and the best placed team on the aggregate table. Should one team win all three tournaments they will automatically become season champions. The aggregate table will also determine the three teams to be relegated at the end of the season.

The teams that qualify for the international competitions will be:

| Competition | Enter competition | Achievement | Berth |
|---|---|---|---|
| 2016 Copa Libertadores | Second stage | Champion | Peru 1 |
| 2016 Copa Libertadores | Second stage | Runner-up | Peru 2 |
| 2016 Copa Libertadores | First stage | Third place | Peru 3 |
| 2016 Copa Sudamericana | First stage | Fourth place | Peru 1 |
| 2016 Copa Sudamericana | First stage | Fifth place | Peru 2 |
| 2016 Copa Sudamericana | First stage | Sixth place | Peru 3 |
| 2016 Copa Sudamericana | First stage | Seventh place | Peru 4 |

Notes

1. Determined by aggregate table

== Teams ==
A total of 17 teams have been confirmed to play in the 2015 Torneo Descentralizado. Fourteen teams from the previous season, the 2014 Segunda División champion (Deportivo Municipal), the 2014 Copa Perú champion (Sport Loreto), and Alianza Atlético which were reinstated in the first division following their relegation in 2011.

=== Team changes ===
| Promoted from 2014 Segunda División | Promoted from 2014 Copa Perú | Reinstated | Relegated from 2014 Primera División |
|---|---|---|---|
| ▲ Deportivo Municipal (1st) | ▲ Sport Loreto (1st) | ▲ Alianza Atlético | ▼ Los Caimanes (15th) ▼ San Simón (16th) |

=== Stadia and locations ===
Locations of the 2015 Primera División teams

| Team | City | Stadium | Capacity |
|---|---|---|---|
| Alianza Atlético | Sullana | Miguel Grau (Piura) | 25,000 |
| Alianza Lima | Lima | Alejandro Villanueva | 35,000 |
| Ayacucho | Ayacucho | Ciudad de Cumaná | 15,000 |
| Cienciano | Cusco | Garcilaso | 40,000 |
| Deportivo Municipal | Lima | Iván Elías Moreno | 10,000 |
| Juan Aurich | Chiclayo | Elías Aguirre | 24,500 |
| León de Huánuco | Huánuco | Heraclio Tapia | 15,000 |
| Melgar | Arequipa | Virgen de Chapi | 40,217 |
| Real Garcilaso | Cusco | Garcilaso | 40,000 |
| Sport Huancayo | Huancayo | Estadio Huancayo | 20,000 |
| Sport Loreto | Pucallpa | Aliardo Soria | 25,000 |
| Sporting Cristal | Lima | Alberto Gallardo | 18,000 |
| Unión Comercio | Nueva Cajamarca | IPD de Moyobamba | 5,000 |
| Universidad César Vallejo | Trujillo | Mansiche | 25,000 |
| Universidad San Martín | Lima | Alberto Gallardo | 18,000 |
| UTC | Cajamarca | Héroes de San Ramón | 18,000 |
| Universitario | Lima | Monumental | 80,093 |

== Torneo del Inca ==
The Torneo del Inca was the first major phase of the overall season. Although the previous season's Torneo del Inca was not part of the national championship, this season the Torneo del Inca's champion could advance to the playoffs if they finish in the top eight of the Torneo Descentralizado's aggregate table. The Torneo del Inca was divided into 3 stages. The first stage was a group stage, the second stage was the semifinals played over two legs, and the third stage was the final. Universidad César Vallejo defeated Alianza Lima in the final.

== Torneo Apertura ==
=== Standings ===
| Pos | Team | Pld | W | D | L | GF | GA | GD | Pts | Qualification |
|---|---|---|---|---|---|---|---|---|---|---|
| 1 | Sporting Cristal | 16 | 9 | 4 | 3 | 25 | 16 | +9 | 31 | Advance to playoffs |
| 2 | Melgar | 16 | 8 | 6 | 2 | 22 | 11 | +11 | 30 | |
| 3 | Deportivo Municipal | 16 | 7 | 7 | 2 | 19 | 13 | +6 | 28 | |
| 4 | Real Garcilaso | 16 | 8 | 4 | 4 | 22 | 20 | +2 | 28 | |
| 5 | Alianza Lima | 16 | 8 | 2 | 6 | 20 | 14 | +6 | 26 | |
| 6 | Unión Comercio | 16 | 7 | 5 | 4 | 21 | 19 | +2 | 26 | |
| 7 | Universidad César Vallejo | 16 | 6 | 6 | 4 | 24 | 20 | +4 | 24 | |
| 8 | Juan Aurich | 16 | 6 | 4 | 6 | 24 | 18 | +6 | 22 | |
| 9 | Sport Huancayo | 16 | 5 | 7 | 4 | 19 | 17 | +2 | 22 | |
| 10 | Alianza Atlético | 16 | 6 | 3 | 7 | 19 | 20 | −1 | 21 | |
| 11 | Cienciano | 16 | 5 | 4 | 7 | 23 | 23 | 0 | 19 | |
| 12 | León de Huánuco | 16 | 5 | 3 | 8 | 21 | 28 | −7 | 18 | |
| 13 | Sport Loreto | 16 | 4 | 5 | 7 | 14 | 18 | −4 | 17 | |
| 14 | Universitario | 16 | 3 | 6 | 7 | 10 | 17 | −7 | 15 | |
| 15 | Ayacucho | 16 | 4 | 3 | 9 | 15 | 25 | −10 | 15 | |
| 16 | UTC | 16 | 3 | 5 | 8 | 21 | 31 | −10 | 14 | |
| 17 | Universidad San Martín | 16 | 3 | 4 | 9 | 14 | 23 | −9 | 13 | |

Updated to match(es) played on unknown. Source:

=== Results ===
| Home \ Away | AAS | ALI | CIE | MUN | AYA | JA | LEÓ | MEL | RGA | CRI | SHU | LOR | UCO | UCV | USM | UTC | UNI |
|---|---|---|---|---|---|---|---|---|---|---|---|---|---|---|---|---|---|
| Alianza Atlético | | 0–1 | 3–2 | | | | | | | 1–1 | 2–0 | 1–0 | | 1–1 | 2–0 | 2–0 | |
| Alianza Lima | | | 1–0 | 0–0 | | 0–1 | 1–0 | | 0–1 | | | | 3–0 | | | 4–1 | 1–0 |
| Cienciano | | | | 3–1 | | 1–2 | 4–2 | 1–3 | 1–1 | | | | 3–2 | | | 2–0 | 1–0 |
| Deportivo Municipal | 2–0 | | | | 2–1 | | | 1–1 | | 1–0 | 3–3 | 0–0 | | 1–0 | 2–0 | | |
| Ayacucho | 2–1 | 2–1 | 0–0 | | | | | | | 1–2 | 0–1 | 1–0 | | 2–2 | 1–0 | | |
| Juan Aurich | 0–1 | | | 1–1 | 5–0 | | | 2–3 | | 1–2 | 4–0 | 0–0 | | | 1–0 | | |
| León de Huánuco | 1–0 | | | 1–1 | 3–2 | 0–2 | | 0–3 | | 1–2 | 0–1 | 2–1 | | | | | |
| Melgar | 2–1 | 3–1 | | | 1–0 | | | | | 0–0 | 1–0 | 2–2 | | 2–0 | 1–1 | | |
| Real Garcilaso | 2–1 | | | 1–0 | 3–2 | 2–1 | 1–2 | 1–0 | | 0–4 | | 4–0 | | | | | |
| Sporting Cristal | | 1–3 | 3–2 | | | | | | | | 1–0 | 2–1 | 1–1 | 1–2 | 2–0 | 3–2 | |
| Sport Huancayo | | 1–1 | 0–0 | | | | | | 1–1 | | | | 3–0 | 1–1 | 2–1 | 5–1 | 0–0 |
| Sport Loreto | | 1–0 | 1–0 | | | | | | 0–1 | | 1–1 | | 0–1 | 1–1 | 4–1 | 2–1 | 0–1 |
| Unión Comercio | 5–2 | | | 0–0 | 1–1 | 3–1 | 2–0 | 1–0 | 1–1 | | | | | | | | 1–0 |
| Universidad César Vallejo | | 1–0 | 3–2 | | | 2–0 | 2–2 | | 2–0 | | | | 0–1 | | | 1–1 | 4–2 |
| Universidad San Martín | | 2–3 | 1–1 | | | | 3–1 | | 2–0 | | | | 0–0 | 3–2 | | 0–0 | 0–1 |
| UTC | | | | 2–3 | 1–0 | 2–2 | 2–2 | 0–0 | 2–3 | | | | 4–2 | | | | 2–0 |
| Universitario | 1–1 | | | 0–1 | 2–0 | 1–1 | 1–4 | 0–0 | 1–1 | 0–0 | | | | | | | |

Updated to match(es) played on February 2015. Source: ADFP - official fixture
Legend: Blue = home team win; Yellow = draw; Red = away team win.

== Torneo Clausura ==
=== Standings ===
| Pos | Team | Pld | W | D | L | GF | GA | GD | Pts | Qualification |
|---|---|---|---|---|---|---|---|---|---|---|
| 1 | Melgar | 16 | 8 | 5 | 3 | 29 | 11 | +18 | 29 | Advance to playoffs |
| 2 | Real Garcilaso | 16 | 8 | 5 | 3 | 26 | 16 | +10 | 29 | |
| 3 | Sport Huancayo | 16 | 8 | 4 | 4 | 28 | 20 | +8 | 28 | |
| 4 | Universitario | 16 | 8 | 4 | 4 | 26 | 20 | +6 | 28 | |
| 5 | Sporting Cristal | 16 | 7 | 6 | 3 | 35 | 24 | +11 | 27 | |
| 6 | Universidad César Vallejo | 16 | 8 | 3 | 5 | 18 | 20 | −2 | 27 | |
| 7 | Universidad San Martín | 16 | 7 | 3 | 6 | 17 | 17 | 0 | 24 | |
| 8 | UTC | 16 | 6 | 5 | 5 | 18 | 15 | +3 | 23 | |
| 9 | Juan Aurich | 16 | 5 | 4 | 7 | 22 | 25 | −3 | 19 | |
| 10 | Ayacucho | 16 | 5 | 4 | 7 | 22 | 26 | −4 | 19 | |
| 11 | Cienciano | 16 | 4 | 6 | 6 | 16 | 19 | −3 | 18 | |
| 12 | Unión Comercio | 16 | 5 | 3 | 8 | 27 | 32 | −5 | 18 | |
| 13 | Deportivo Municipal | 16 | 4 | 6 | 6 | 13 | 22 | −9 | 18 | |
| 14 | Alianza Lima | 16 | 4 | 5 | 7 | 18 | 21 | −3 | 17 | |
| 15 | Alianza Atlético | 16 | 4 | 4 | 8 | 20 | 29 | −9 | 16 | |
| 16 | León de Huánuco | 16 | 3 | 6 | 7 | 21 | 31 | −10 | 15 | |
| 17 | Sport Loreto | 16 | 3 | 5 | 8 | 13 | 21 | −8 | 14 | |

Updated to match(es) played on unknown. Source:

=== Clausura play-off ===
Because Melgar and Real Garcilaso tied with 29 points a title play-off on neutral ground was played as the tournament rules specify.

December 2, 2015
19:30
Clausura play-off

| Melgar | 1–1 | Real Garcilaso |
|---|---|---|
| Gonzales Vigíl 68' | | 89' Rodríguez |
Penalties
| Schuler (penalty scored); Hinostroza (penalty scored); Palomino (penalty scored); Arce (penalty scored) | 4–2 | (penalty missed) Ramúa; (penalty scored) Aubert; (penalty scored) Rodríguez; (penalty missed) Carando |

Miguel Grau, Callao
Referee: Manuel Garay

=== Results ===
| Home \ Away | AAS | ALI | CIE | MUN | AYA | JA | LEÓ | MEL | RGA | CRI | SHU | LOR | UCO | UCV | USM | UTC | UNI |
|---|---|---|---|---|---|---|---|---|---|---|---|---|---|---|---|---|---|
| Alianza Atlético | | | | 4–1 | 3–3 | 2–2 | | 0–0 | 3–1 | | | | 2–1 | | | | 1–2 |
| Alianza Lima | 4–2 | | | | 0–1 | | | 0–0 | | 2–0 | 3–0 | 1–0 | | 2–2 | 0–1 | | |
| Cienciano | 2–0 | 1–0 | | | 1–1 | | | | | 2–2 | 0–1 | 1–0 | | 0–1 | 3–0 | | |
| Deportivo Municipal | | 2–1 | 1–0 | | | 1–2 | 1–1 | | 1–0 | | | | 1–1 | | | 1–1 | 0–1 |
| Ayacucho | | | | 2–0 | | 2–1 | 2–0 | 1–2 | 2–2 | | | | 4–0 | | | 1–2 | 1–2 |
| Juan Aurich | | 2–0 | 2–2 | | | | 3–0 | | 1–3 | | | | 1–0 | 2–1 | | 0–0 | 2–2 |
| León de Huánuco | | 3–1 | 0–0 | | | | | | 2–4 | | | | 3–3 | 1–1 | 1–2 | 2–0 | 3–2 |
| Melgar | | | 5–1 | 0–0 | | 4–1 | 5–0 | | 2–0 | | | | 4–1 | | | 1–0 | 2–0 |
| Real Garcilaso | | 1–1 | 1–1 | | | | | | | | 0–0 | | 2–1 | 4–0 | 1–0 | 2–0 | 4–2 |
| Sporting Cristal | 4–1 | | | 2–2 | 4–0 | 3–2 | 1–1 | 2–2 | 0–0 | | | | | | | | 1–2 |
| Sport Huancayo | 4–0 | | | 5–0 | 2–2 | 1–0 | 4–3 | 3–2 | | 5–3 | | 2–0 | | | | | |
| Sport Loreto | 0–0 | | | 1–2 | 3–0 | 1–0 | 1–1 | 0–0 | 0–1 | 2–2 | | | | | | | |
| Unión Comercio | | 2–2 | 3–1 | | | | | | | 1–4 | 2–0 | 5–2 | | 1–2 | 1–2 | 2–0 | |
| Universidad César Vallejo | 1–0 | | | 1–0 | 1–0 | | | 1–0 | | 0–2 | 0–0 | 4–2 | | | 2–1 | | |
| Universidad San Martín | 2–1 | | | 0–0 | 3–0 | 3–1 | | 1–0 | | 0–2 | 1–1 | 0–1 | | | | | |
| UTC | 2–0 | 3–0 | 0–0 | | | | | | | 2–3 | 2–0 | 2–0 | | 2–1 | 1–1 | | |
| Universitario | | 1–1 | 2–1 | | | | | | | | 2–0 | 0–0 | 2–3 | 3–0 | 2–0 | 1–1 | |

Updated to match(es) played on February 2015. Source: ADFP - official fixture
Legend: Blue = home team win; Yellow = draw; Red = away team win.

== Aggregate table ==
| Pos | Team | Pld | W | D | L | GF | GA | GD | Pts | Qualification or relegation |
|---|---|---|---|---|---|---|---|---|---|---|
| 1 | Melgar (C) | 32 | 16 | 11 | 5 | 51 | 22 | +29 | 60 (Note: Melgar were awarded 1 point for 2015 Torneo de Promoción y Reserva success.) | Advance to semifinals as Clausura winners |
| 2 | Sporting Cristal | 32 | 16 | 10 | 6 | 60 | 40 | +20 | 58 | Advance to semifinals as Apertura winners |
| 3 | Real Garcilaso | 32 | 16 | 9 | 7 | 48 | 36 | +12 | 57 | Advance to semifinal as best placed team on aggregate table |
| 4 | Universidad César Vallejo | 32 | 14 | 9 | 9 | 42 | 40 | +2 | 51 | Advance to semifinals as Torneo del Inca winner |
| 5 | Sport Huancayo | 32 | 13 | 11 | 8 | 47 | 37 | +10 | 47 (Note: Sport Huancayo were deducted 3 points for ADFP.) | Qualification to the 2016 Copa Sudamericana first stage |
| 6 | Deportivo Municipal | 32 | 11 | 13 | 8 | 32 | 35 | −3 | 46 | Qualification to the 2016 Copa Sudamericana first stage |
| 7 | Universitario | 32 | 11 | 10 | 11 | 36 | 37 | −1 | 44 (Note: Universitario were awarded 1 point for 2015 Torneo de Promoción y Reserva success.) | Qualification to the 2016 Copa Sudamericana first stage |
| 8 | Unión Comercio | 32 | 12 | 8 | 12 | 48 | 51 | −3 | 44 | |
| 9 | Alianza Lima | 32 | 12 | 7 | 13 | 38 | 35 | +3 | 43 | |
| 10 | Juan Aurich | 32 | 11 | 8 | 13 | 46 | 43 | +3 | 41 | |
| 11 | Universidad San Martín | 32 | 10 | 7 | 15 | 31 | 40 | −9 | 38 (Note: Universidad San Martín were awarded 1 point for 2015 Torneo de Promoción y Reserva success.) | |
| 12 | UTC | 32 | 9 | 10 | 13 | 39 | 46 | −7 | 37 | |
| 13 | Alianza Atlético | 32 | 10 | 7 | 15 | 39 | 49 | −10 | 37 | |
| 14 | Ayacucho | 32 | 9 | 7 | 16 | 37 | 51 | −14 | 33 (Note: Ayacucho were deducted 1 point for finishing 16th in the 2015 Torneo del Inca.) | |
| 15 | Cienciano (R) | 32 | 9 | 10 | 13 | 39 | 42 | −3 | 31 (Note: Cienciano were deducted 6 points for an outstanding debt with the players' union SAFAP.) | Relegation to 2016 Segunda División |
| 16 | Sport Loreto (R) | 32 | 7 | 10 | 15 | 27 | 39 | −12 | 29 (Note: Sport Loreto were deducted 2 points for finishing 17th in the 2015 Torneo del Inca.) | Relegation to 2016 Segunda División |
| 17 | León de Huánuco (R) | 32 | 8 | 9 | 15 | 42 | 59 | −17 | 29 (Note: León de Huánuco were deducted 4 points for an outstanding debt with the players' union SAFAP.) | Relegation to 2016 Segunda División |

Updated to match(es) played on unknown. Source:
(C) Champions; (R) Relegated

== Playoff phase ==
Semi-finals
Universidad César Vallejo | 1 | 4 | 5
Sporting Cristal | 3 | 3 | 6
Melgar | 1 | 4 | 5
Real Garcilaso | 0 | 0 | 0

Final
Sporting Cristal | 2 | 2 | 4
Melgar | 2 | 3 | 5
Third place play-off
Universidad César Vallejo | 0 | 3 | 3
Real Garcilaso | 1 | 0 | 1

=== Semi-finals ===
The teams that will qualify to the semi-finals will be the first place team on the aggregate table, the Torneo Apertura winner, the Torneo Clausura winner, and the 2015 Torneo del Inca winner. A draw will be held to determine the match-ups.

==== First leg ====
December 6, 2015
13:00
First Leg

| Melgar | 1–0 | Real Garcilaso |
|---|---|---|
| Zúñiga 89' (pen.) |

Virgen de Chapi, Arequipa
Attendance: 31,806
Referee: Diego Haro

December 6, 2015
15:30
First Leg

| Sporting Cristal | 3–1 | Universidad César Vallejo |
|---|---|---|
| Revoredo 26' 54'; Luiz da Silva 87' | | 24' Chávez |

Alberto Gallardo, Lima
Attendance: 7,018
Referee: Luis Seminario

==== Second leg ====
December 9, 2015
13:00
Second Leg

| Universidad César Vallejo | 4–3 | Sporting Cristal |
|---|---|---|
| Millán 12' 79'; Ciucci 34'; Silva 88' | | 31' (o.g.) Cardoza; 47' Ávila; 51' Luiz da Silva |

Mansiche, Trujillo
Attendance: 9,284
Referee: Manuel Garay

December 9, 2015
15:30
Second Leg

| Real Garcilaso | 0–4 | Melgar |
|---|---|---|
| | | 7' Arias; 22' 74' 83' Cuesta |

Garcilaso, Cusco
Attendance: 12,350
Referee: Michael Espinoza

=== Third place play-off ===
The two losing semi-finalists will play in a match to determine the third place team of the season.

December 12, 2015
15:30

| Real Garcilaso | 1–0 | Universidad César Vallejo |
|---|---|---|
| Correa 20' |

Garcilaso, Cusco
Attendance: 719
Referee: Luis Seminario
December 15, 2015
15:30

| Universidad César Vallejo | 3–0 | Real Garcilaso |
|---|---|---|
| Montes 20'; Millán 84'; Cobelli 88' |

Mansiche, Trujillo
Attendance: 2,453
Referee: Manuel Garay

=== Finals ===
The two winning semi-finalists will contest the finals.

December 13, 2015
15:30
First Leg

| Sporting Cristal | 2–2 | Melgar |
|---|---|---|
| Quina 43' (o.g.); Sheput 52' (pen.) | | 40' Uribe; 87' Quina |

Nacional, Lima
Attendance: 21,955
Referee: Diego Haro

December 16, 2015
15:30
Second Leg

| Melgar | 3–2 | Sporting Cristal |
|---|---|---|
| Zúñiga 22'; Fernández (44.); Cuesta 90' | | 16' Da Silva; 71' (pen.) Blanco |

Virgen de Chapi, Arequipa
Attendance: 35,565
Referee: Luis Garay

== Attendances ==
| No. | Club | Average |
|---|---|---|
| 1 | Melgar | 15,342 |
| 2 | Alianza Lima | 11,404 |
| 3 | Sport Loreto | 9,178 |
| 4 | Universitario | 8,792 |
| 5 | Cienciano | 8,147 |
| 6 | Sporting Cristal | 6,366 |
| 7 | Universidad César Vallejo | 5,941 |
| 8 | UTC Cajamarca | 5,029 |
| 9 | Deportivo Municipal | 4,999 |
| 10 | Real Garcilaso | 4,476 |
| 11 | León de Huánuco | 3,659 |
| 12 | Ayacucho | 3,593 |
| 13 | Unión Comercio | 3,000 |
| 14 | Sport Huancayo | 2,552 |
| 15 | Juan Aurich | 2,087 |
| 16 | Alianza Atlético | 1,950 |
| 17 | Universidad San Martín | 1,116 |

== See also ==
- 2015 Torneo del Inca
- 2015 Torneo de Promoción y Reserva
- 2015 in Peruvian football
