= 2015 Peruvian Segunda División =

Peruvian Segunda División
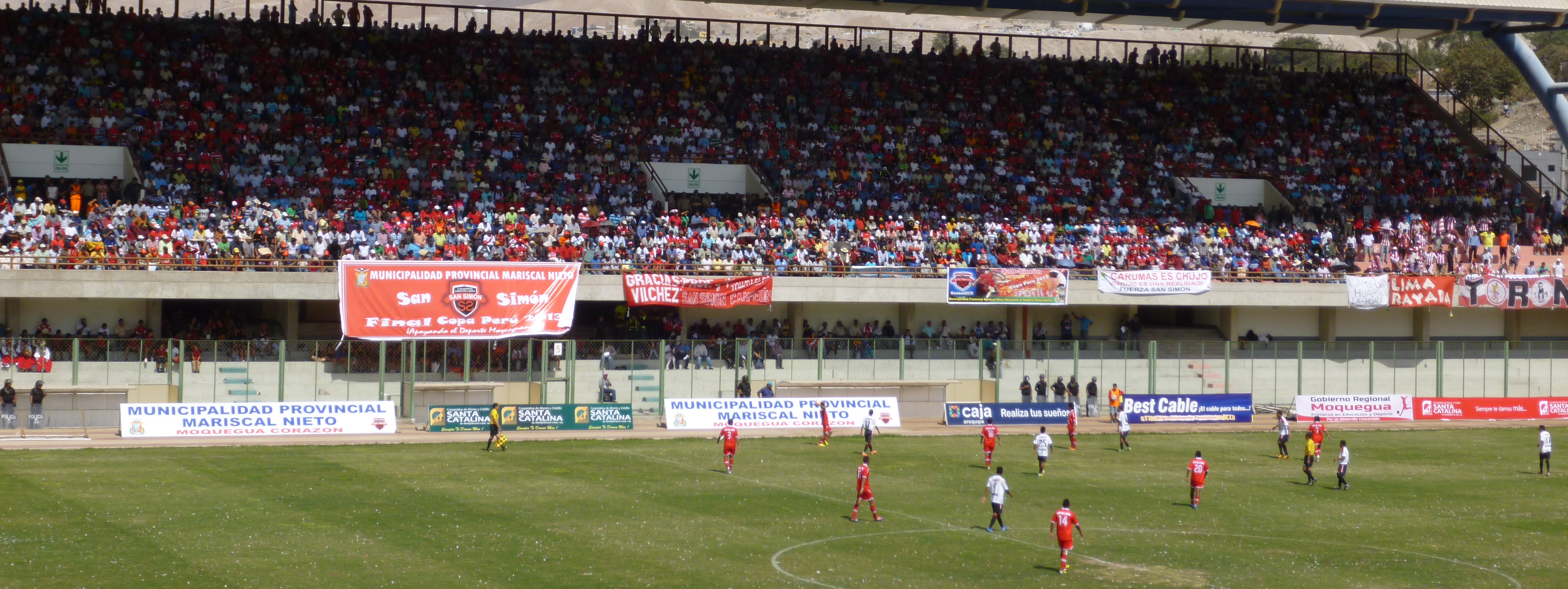
- Season: 2015
- Dates: 23 May – 25 October 2015
- Champions: Comerciantes Unidos
- Relegated: Atlético Minero; San Simón
- Matches: 123
- Top goalscorer: Carlos Pérez (14 goals)
- Biggest home win: Alianza Universidad 7–1 Atlético Minero (Sept. 6)
- Biggest away win: Carlos A. Mannucci 0–5 Sport Boys (Jun. 7)
- Highest scoring: Alianza Universidad 7–1 Minero (Sept. 6)
- Highest attendance: 5,743; Sport Boys 3–1 Alianza Universidad (Aug. 19)
- Total attendance: 166,439
- Average attendance: 1,353

The 2015 Segunda División season, was the 63rd edition of the second tier of Federación Peruana de Futbol. The tournament was played on a home-and-away round-robin basis.

- Alfonso Ugarte, Defensor San Alejandro and Pacífico withdrew before the start of the season and were relegated to the Copa Perú.
- Unión Fuerza Minera withdrew before the start the season due to financial problems.
- San Simón was disabled and relegated to the Copa Perú for outstanding debts with the SAFAP.

== Teams ==
=== Team changes ===
Relegated from 2014 Primera División	Promoted to 2015 Primera División	Relegated to 2015 Copa Perú	Retired
▼ Los Caimanes (15th) ▼ San Simón (16th)	▲ Deportivo Municipal (1st)	▼ José Gálvez (15th) ▼ Walter Ormeño (16th)	▼ San Simón (Retired)

=== Stadia and Locations ===
Locations of the 2015 Segunda División teams

Team	City	Stadium	Capacity
Alianza Universidad	Huánuco	Heraclio Tapia	15,000
Atlético Minero	Matucana	Municipal de Matucana	5,000
Atlético Torino	Talara	Campeonísimo	8,000
Carlos A. Mannucci	Trujillo	Mansiche	25,000
Comerciantes Unidos	Cutervo	Juan Maldonado Gamarra	8,000
Deportivo Coopsol	Chancay	Rómulo Shaw Cisneros	13,000
Los Caimanes	Puerto Etén	Elias Aguirre	24,500
San Simón	Moquegua	25 de Noviembre	21,000
Sport Boys	Callao	Miguel Grau	15,000
Sport Victoria	Ica	José Picasso Peratta	8,000
Unión Huaral	Huaral	Julio Lores Colan	10,000
Willy Serrato	Pimentel	Elías Aguirre	24,500

== League table ==
=== Standings ===
Pos	Team	Pld	W	D	L	GF	GA	GD	Pts	Promotion or relegation
1	Comerciantes Unidos (C)	22	14	3	5	45	34	+11	43 (Note: Comerciantes Unidos was docked a total of 2 points for outstanding debts with the SAFAP.)	2016 Primera División
2	Los Caimanes	22	12	5	5	34	26	+8	41	
3	Atlético Torino	22	11	4	7	30	24	+6	35 (Note: Torino was docked a total of 2 points for outstanding debts with the SAFAP.)	
4	Willy Serrato	22	9	7	6	30	27	+3	34	
5	Deportivo Coopsol	22	10	4	8	34	28	+6	34	
6	Alianza Universidad	22	8	7	7	36	24	+12	31	
7	Sport Boys	22	10	4	8	36	24	+12	30 (Note: Sport Boys was docked a total of 4 points for outstanding debts with the SAFAP.)	
8	Unión Huaral	22	9	3	10	26	26	0	30	
9	Sport Victoria	22	5	8	9	28	31	−3	23	
10	Carlos A. Mannucci	22	5	8	9	24	32	−8	21 (Note: Carlos A. Mannucci was docked a total of 2 points for outstanding debts with the SAFAP.)	
11	Atlético Minero (R)	22	3	6	13	15	39	−24	15	2016 Copa Perú
12	San Simón (R)	22	4	5	13	14	39	−25	9 (Note: San Simón was docked a total of 8 points for outstanding debts with the SAFAP and was disabled and relegated to the Copa Perú.)	2016 Copa Perú

Updated to match(es) played on 2015. Source: ADFP-SD - official site
Rules for classification: 1) points; 2) goal difference; 3) number of goals scored; 4) head-to-head record; 5) drawing of lots
(C) Champions; (R) Relegated

== Results ==
Home \ Away	AUN	ATM	ATT	CAI	CAM	COM	COO	SIM	SBA	VIC	HUA	WSP
Alianza Universidad		7–1	0–2	6–1	1–1	2–2	2–0	0–0	1–0	3–1	0–0	3–0
Atlético Minero	0–0		1–1	0–1	1–1	1–2	1–0	3–0	1–1	1–0	0–2	1–1
Atlético Torino	1–0	2–0		1–1	4–3	2–1	2–1	3–0	2–2	3–1	1–0	1–0
Los Caimanes	2–0	3–0	2–0		0–0	2–1	3–3	1–0	2–1	2–1	2–1	1–1
Carlos A. Mannucci	0–3	2–1	2–0	1–1		0–1	3–1	1–1	0–5	1–1	1–1	0–0
Comerciantes Unidos	2–2	4–0	2–0	3–1	3–2		3–2	3–2	1–0	4–2	2–1	3–1
Deportivo Coopsol	2–1	1–0	1–1	2–1	2–1	3–0		3–0	0–0	2–1	4–1	1–3
San Simón	2–3	1–0	2–1	0–3	0–3	1–1	0–1		2–1	0–3	0–3	2–3
Sport Boys	3–1	4–0	1–0	2–1	1–0	4–2	1–0	3–0		2–2	3–1	0–1
Sport Victoria	1–1	1–1	1–2	2–1	2–0	0–1	2–2	0–0	2–0		1–0	2–2
Unión Huaral	1–0	3–2	1–0	0–1	1–2	3–1	1–2	0–1	1–0	2–1		1–0
Willy Serrato	2–0	2–0	2–1	1–2	1–0	2–4	1–0	0–0	4–2	1–1	2–2	

Updated to match(es) played on July 12, 2015. Source: ADFP-SD - official fixture
Legend: Blue = home team win; Yellow = draw; Red = away team win.

== See also ==
- 2015 Torneo Descentralizado
- 2015 Copa Perú
- 2015 in Peruvian football
