= 2015 Torneo de Promoción y Reservas =

Torneo de Promoción y Reservas
- Season: 2015
- Champions: Torneo del Inca: Universitario; Torneo Descentralizado: Melgar

The Torneo de Promoción y Reservas is a football tournament in Peru. There are currently 17 clubs in the league. Each team will have a roster of twelve 21-year-old players, three 19-year-olds, and three older reinforcements; whenever they be recorded in the club. The tournament will offer the champion two bonus points and the runner-up one bonus point to the respective regular teams in the 2015 Torneo Descentralizado.

== Teams ==
=== Stadia and locations ===
Locations of the 2015 Torneo de Promoción y Reserva teams

Team	City	Stadium	Capacity
Alianza Atlético	Sullana	Miguel Grau (Piura)	25,000
Alianza Lima	Lima	Alejandro Villanueva	35,000
Ayacucho	Ayacucho	Ciudad de Cumaná	15,000
Cienciano	Cusco	Garcilaso	40,000
Deportivo Municipal	Lima	Iván Elías Moreno	10,000
Juan Aurich	Chiclayo	Elías Aguirre	24,500
León de Huánuco	Huánuco	Heraclio Tapia	15,000
Melgar	Arequipa	Virgen de Chapi	40,217
Real Garcilaso	Cusco	Garcilaso	40,000
Sport Huancayo	Huancayo	Estadio Huancayo	20,000
Sport Loreto	Pucallpa	Aliardo Soria	25,000
Sporting Cristal	Lima	Alberto Gallardo	18,000
Unión Comercio	Nueva Cajamarca	IPD de Moyobamba	5,000
Universidad César Vallejo	Trujillo	Mansiche	25,000
Universidad San Martín	Lima	Alberto Gallardo	18,000
UTC	Cajamarca	Héroes de San Ramón	18,000
Universitario	Lima	Monumental	80,093

== Torneo del Inca ==
=== Group A ===
Pos	Team	Pld	W	D	L	GF	GA	GD	Pts	MEL	CRI	CIE	USM	MUN	JUA
1	Melgar	10	7	2	1	19	8	+11	23		0–0	2–0	1–0	3–0	3–0
2	Sporting Cristal	10	5	3	2	24	13	+11	18	1–3		2–1	5–0	2–1	7–0
3	Cienciano	10	5	0	5	17	16	+1	15	2–3	2–0		1–0	3–0	3–0
4	Universidad San Martín	10	3	2	5	13	18	−5	11	1–2	1–1	5–3		2–3	1–0
5	Deportivo Municipal	10	3	1	6	18	21	−3	10	1–1	3–4	1–2	2–3		4–1
6	Juan Aurich	10	2	2	6	9	24	−15	8	3–2	2–2	3–0	0–0	0–3	

Updated to match(es) played on unknown. Source: ADFP - official fixture

=== Group B ===
Pos	Team	Pld	W	D	L	GF	GA	GD	Pts	UNI	UTC	LEO	UCV	AAS	GAR
1	Universitario	10	7	2	1	28	10	+18	23		4–3	1–0	2–0	4–1	6–0
2	UTC	10	5	1	4	21	17	+4	16	0–2		1–0	3–2	3–0	4–1
3	León de Huánuco	10	4	3	3	13	13	0	15	1–1	1–0		1–0	2–2	3–2
4	Universidad César Vallejo	10	3	3	4	19	16	+3	12	0–2	5–2	0–3		0–0	5–0
5	Alianza Atlético	10	2	4	4	14	23	−9	10	3–3	0–3	3–2	3–3		2–0
6	Real Garcilaso	10	1	3	6	13	32	−19	6	0–5	2–2	3–3	2–2	3–0	

Updated to match(es) played on unknown. Source: ADFP - official fixture

=== Group C ===
Pos	Team	Pld	W	D	L	GF	GA	GD	Pts	SLO	ALI	SHU	AYA	UCO
1	Sport Loreto	8	4	2	2	14	9	+5	14		2–2	3–0	2–1	3–2
2	Alianza Lima	8	4	1	3	10	6	+4	13	1–0		1–0	3–0	2–0
3	Sport Huancayo	8	4	1	3	8	8	0	13	0–0	2–1		2–1	3–1
4	Ayacucho	8	2	2	4	10	13	−3	8	3–1	2–1	1–2		0–0
5	Unión Comercio	8	2	2	4	8	12	−4	8	1–2	1–0	1–0	2–2	

Updated to match(es) played on unknown. Source: ADFP - official fixture

=== Average table ===
The teams will be ranked based on points per game.

Pos	Team	Pts	Pld	GD	PPG	Qualification
1	Universitario	23	10	+18	2.3	Champion, Bonus +1 to 2015 Torneo Descentralizado
2	Melgar	23	10	+11	2.3	
3	Sporting Cristal	18	10	+11	1.8	
4	Sport Loreto	14	8	+5	1.75	
5	Alianza Lima	13	8	+4	1.625	
6	Sport Huancayo	13	8	0	1.625	
7	UTC	16	10	+4	1.6	
8	Cienciano	15	10	+1	1.5	
9	León de Huánuco	15	10	0	1.5	
10	Universidad César Vallejo	12	10	+3	1.2	
11	Universidad San Martín	11	10	-5	1.1	
12	Deportivo Municipal	10	10	-3	1	
13	Ayacucho	8	8	-3	1	
14	Unión Comercio	8	8	-4	1	
15	Alianza Atlético	10	10	-9	1	
16	Juan Aurich	8	10	-15	0.8	
17	Real Garcilaso	6	10	-19	0.6	

== Torneo Descentralizado ==
=== Torneo Apertura ===
==== Standings ====
Pos	Team	Pld	W	D	L	GF	GA	GD	Pts	Qualification
1	Melgar	16	12	1	3	38	14	+24	37	Bonus +1 to 2015 Torneo Descentralizado
2	Unión Comercio	16	12	1	3	34	19	+15	37	
3	Deportivo Municipal	16	9	3	4	26	14	+12	30	
4	Universitario	16	9	2	5	17	11	+6	29	
5	Real Garcilaso	16	8	1	7	28	22	+6	25	
6	Sporting Cristal	16	7	3	6	22	22	0	24	
7	Universidad San Martín	16	5	7	4	16	18	−2	22	
8	Alianza Lima	16	5	6	5	18	17	+1	21	
9	Sport Huancayo	16	6	3	7	24	26	−2	21	
10	Ayacucho	16	6	2	8	26	15	+11	20	
11	Juan Aurich	16	5	4	7	25	25	0	19	
12	Cienciano	16	4	7	5	20	23	−3	19	
13	UTC	16	6	1	9	20	33	−13	19	
14	Sport Loreto	16	5	3	8	26	30	−4	18	
15	Universidad César Vallejo	16	2	7	7	9	22	−13	13	
16	León de Huánuco	16	3	4	9	14	35	−21	13	
17	Alianza Atlético	16	3	3	10	15	32	−17	12	

Updated to match(es) played on unknown. Source:

==== Results ====
Home \ Away	AAS	ALI	CIE	MUN	AYA	JA	LEÓ	MEL	RGA	CRI	SHU	LOR	UCO	UCV	USM	UTC	UNI
Alianza Atlético		3–2	1–1							0–1	1–0	2–2		0–0	1–2	2–3	
Alianza Lima			1–1	1–1		1–0	0–0		1–0				0–2			3–0	0–1
Cienciano				0–1		3–0	3–0	1–5	2–2				2–3			1–0	1–0
Deportivo Municipal	1–0				1–0			0–1		1–1	3–0	2–2		3–1	2–0		
Ayacucho	6–0	1–2	4–1							1–2	4–0	3–0		0–0	0–1		
Juan Aurich	0–1			1–2	1–1			2–1		1–0	4–1	3–1			1–1		
León de Huánuco	2–1			0–4	1–3	3–3		1–4		1–0	0–3	0–1					
Melgar	3–2	3–1			2–1					3–1	4–0	3–1		0–1	4–0		
Real Garcilaso	3–1			3–1	1–0	3–1	5–0	2–3		0–2		3–0					
Sporting Cristal		2–2	1–1								1–2	4–3	2–1	3–0	2–1	0–3	
Sport Huancayo		1–0	1–1						1–2				1–1	5–1	1–1	6–0	2–1
Sport Loreto		2–2	2–0								2–0		2–4	2–0	1–3	5–1	0–1
Unión Comercio	3–0			3–2	2–1	2–0	3–2	0–3	3–1								0–1
Universidad César Vallejo		0–2	1–1			1–1	0–0		1–0				1–2			1–1	0–1
Universidad San Martín		0–0	1–1				0–0		2–1				2–3	1–1		2–0	0–0
UTC				0–2	1–0	4–3	2–3	1–0	4–0				0–2				0–3
Universitario	3–0			1–0	0–1	0–4	3–1	0–0	0–2	2–0							

Updated to match(es) played on February 2015. Source: ADFP - official fixture
Legend: Blue = home team win; Yellow = draw; Red = away team win.

=== Torneo Clausura ===
==== Standings ====
Pos	Team	Pld	W	D	L	GF	GA	GD	Pts	Qualification
1	Universidad San Martín	16	11	1	4	38	18	+20	34	Bonus +1 to 2015 Torneo Descentralizado
2	Sporting Cristal	16	10	3	3	39	19	+20	33	
3	Sport Huancayo	16	8	4	4	37	25	+12	28	
4	Unión Comercio	16	8	2	6	39	25	+14	26	
5	Melgar	16	7	5	4	23	12	+11	26	
6	Universitario	16	7	5	4	27	19	+8	26	
7	Deportivo Municipal	16	7	5	4	27	21	+6	26	
8	Juan Aurich	16	7	4	5	29	30	−1	25	
9	Cienciano	16	7	3	6	23	20	+3	24	
10	Ayacucho	16	6	6	4	27	26	+1	24	
11	Alianza Atlético	16	5	7	4	28	33	−5	22	
12	Universidad César Vallejo	16	6	1	9	26	26	0	19	
13	Alianza Lima	16	4	6	6	19	21	−2	18	
14	León de Huánuco	16	5	2	9	20	39	−19	17	
15	Sport Loreto	16	4	3	9	16	34	−18	15	
16	Real Garcilaso	16	3	1	12	16	39	−23	10	
17	UTC	16	1	2	13	9	36	−27	5	

Updated to match(es) played on unknown. Source:

==== Results ====
Home \ Away	AAS	ALI	CIE	MUN	AYA	JA	LEÓ	MEL	RGA	CRI	SHU	LOR	UCO	UCV	USM	UTC	UNI
Alianza Atlético				1–1	2–1	4–4	2–1	1–4	2–1				2–2				2–2
Alianza Lima	1–1				0–1			0–1		0–0	1–0	1–1		2–1	0–1		
Cienciano	3–2	4–3			2–2					1–0	0–2	5–0		2–1	1–1		
Deportivo Municipal		2–2	0–0			1–1	2–0		4–1				3–2			2–0	2–2
Ayacucho				1–2		7–3	4–2	0–0	2–1				1–0			1–0	3–3
Juan Aurich		1–1	3–2				2–0		2–1				2–0	1–2		3–0	1–0
León de Huánuco		1–1	2–1		2–1				3–0				0–4	2–1	0–6		0–0
Melgar			1–0	2–0		3–0	1–1		3–0				1–2			3–1	0–0
Real Garcilaso		2–1	0–1								2–3		3–3	2–1	1–2	1–0	1–3
Sporting Cristal	2–2			2–1	3–1	4–2	7–1	1–0	6–0								2–3
Sport Huancayo	6–2			5–2	1–1	2–2	4–1	1–1		1–1							
Sport Loreto	0–1			1–0	1–1	3–0	3–2	1–1	3–0	1–3							
Unión Comercio		1–2	2–0		6–0					2–4	4–2			3–1	4–2	4–0	
Universidad César Vallejo	2–4			1–2	1–1			1–0		3–1	3–1	4–0			1–2		
Universidad San Martín	3–0			0–3	5–0	0–2		3–2		0–1	2–1	3–0					
UTC	0–0	2–2	0–1							1–2	1–2	3–2		0–3	0–5		
Universitario		0–2	1–0								2–3	1–0	2–0	3–0	2–3	3–0	

Updated to match(es) played on February 2015. Source: ADFP - official fixture
Legend: Blue = home team win; Yellow = draw; Red = away team win.

=== Aggregate table ===
Pos	Team	Pld	W	D	L	GF	GA	GD	Pts	Qualification
1	Melgar	32	19	6	7	61	26	+35	63	Bonus +1 to 2014 Torneo Descentralizado
2	Unión Comercio	32	20	3	9	72	44	+28	63	Bonus +1 to 2014 Torneo Descentralizado
3	Sporting Cristal	32	17	6	9	61	41	+20	57	
4	Universidad San Martín	32	16	8	8	54	36	+18	56	
5	Deportivo Municipal	32	16	8	8	53	35	+18	56	
6	Universitario	32	16	7	9	44	30	+14	55	
7	Sport Huancayo	32	14	7	11	61	51	+10	49	
8	Ayacucho	32	12	8	12	53	41	+12	44	
9	Juan Aurich	32	12	8	12	54	55	−1	44	
10	Cienciano	32	11	10	11	43	43	0	43	
11	Alianza Lima	32	9	12	11	37	38	−1	39	
12	Real Garcilaso	32	11	2	19	44	61	−17	35	
13	Alianza Atlético	32	8	10	14	43	65	−22	34	
14	Sport Loreto	32	9	6	17	42	64	−22	33	
15	Universidad César Vallejo	32	8	8	16	35	48	−13	32	
16	León de Huánuco	32	8	6	18	34	74	−40	30	
17	UTC	32	7	3	22	29	69	−40	24	

Updated to match(es) played on 2014. Source: ADFP - official site
Rules for classification: 1) points; 2) goal difference; 3) number of goals scored

== See also ==
- 2015 Torneo del Inca
- 2015 Torneo Descentralizado
