= Hernán Hinostroza =

Peruvian footballer (born 1993)

Personal information
- Full name: Paulo Hernán Junior; Hinostroza Vásquez
- Date of birth: 21 December 1993 (age 32)
- Place of birth: Lima, Peru
- Height: 1.76 m (5 ft 9 in)
- Position: Midfielder

Team information
- Current team: Santos de Nasca
- Number: 6

Youth career
- 2000–2006: Cueto La Rosa
- 2007–2011: Alianza Lima

Senior career*
Years	Team	Apps	(Gls)
2011	Alianza Lima	1	(0)
2012–2015	Zulte Waregem	19	(1)
2013–2014	→ USMP (loan)	50	(2)
2015–2018	Melgar	54	(1)
2017	→ Juan Aurich (loan)	11	(0)
2018	Kazma SC	8	(0)
2019–2020	Melgar	30	(2)
2020–2021	Chavelines Juniors	29	(0)
2022-	Santos de Nasca	0	(0)

International career
2013	Peru U20	7	(0)
2014	Peru	3	(0)
Medal record
Melgar
Winner	Peruvian League	2015
- * Club domestic league appearances and goals as of 15:16, 5 October 2020 (UTC)

Paulo Hernán Junior Hinostroza Vásquez (born 21 December 1993), known simply as Churrito Hinostroza, is a Peruvian professional footballer who plays as a midfielder who plays for Santos de Nasca of the Peruvian Segunda División.

== Club career ==
Hinostroza first started his youth career in 2000 in the Cueto La Rosa youth academy, which is run by César Cueto and Guillermo La Rosa. Then in 2007 he joined Peruvian giants Alianza Lima. In 2011, he was promoted to Alianza Lima's reserve team. He made 15 appearances and scored one goal in the 2011 Reserve League season. Hinostroza made his Torneo Descentralizado league debut on 7 August 2011 in the 17th Round of the 2011 season away to Alianza Atlético. He entered the match late in the game for Junior Viza to wrap up the 2–0 win for his side.

On 21 December 2011, it was announced that Hinostroza joined Belgian club Zulte Waregem and signed a 4.5-year contract. He made his official debut on 18 March 2012 in a 2–0 home win against Mechelen.

== Honours ==
FBC Melgar

- Torneo Descentralizado: 2015
