= Copa Ciudad de Trujillo =

- Founded: 2010
- Region: South America (CONMEBOL)
- Teams: 4
- Current champions: (Peru) Universidad César Vallejo
- Most championships: (Peru) Universidad César Vallejo (1title); Universidad San Martín (1 title)

The Copa Ciudad de Trujillo, was an international exhibition football competition hosted in Trujillo, Peru since 2010. It features four teams: Trujillo's major team Universidad César Vallejo, and guest teams from Colombia (in 2010 and 2011), Ecuador (in 2010), and Peru (in 2010 and 2011). All matches are played at the Estadio Mansiche in Trujillo, the home stadium of the Universidad César Vallejo.

The 2010 edition was won by Peruvian club Universidad San Martín, and the 2011 edition was won by Peruvian club Universidad César Vallejo.

== Champions ==
- (In bracket, title count):

Season	Champion	Runner-up	Third Place	Fourth Place
2010	(Peru) Universidad San Martín (1)	(Ecuador) ESPOLI	(Colombia) América de Cali	(Peru) Universidad César Vallejo
2011	(Peru) Universidad César Vallejo (1)	(Colombia) Millonarios	(Peru) León de Huánuco	(Peru) Melgar

== Titles by club ==
Rank	Club	Winners	Winning Seasons
1	Universidad César Vallejo	1	2011
1	Universidad San Martín	1	2010

== 2010 Copa Ciudad de Trujillo ==
=== Semifinals ===
29 January 2010	Universidad San Martín (Peru)	2–1	(Colombia) América de Cali	Estadio Mansiche, Trujillo
	Germán Alemanno 24'; Roberto Silva 68'		Duván Zapata 60'

29 January 2010	Universidad César Vallejo (Peru)	1–2	(Ecuador) ESPOLI	Estadio Mansiche, Trujillo
20:15	Mayer Candelo 63'		Mario Troncoso 60'; Cristian Marquez 82'

=== Third Place ===
31 January 2010	Universidad César Vallejo (Peru)	2–2 (3–4 p)	(Colombia) América de Cali	Estadio Mansiche, Trujillo
	Eric Torres 33'; Juan Francisco Hernández 45'		Héctor Holguín 11'; Duván Zapata 40'
	Penalties
	Juan Francisco Hernández (penalty missed); Mayer Candelo (penalty scored); Sidney Faiffer (penalty scored); Christian Zúñiga (penalty missed); Fischer Guevara (penalty scored); Manuel Corrales (penalty missed)		(penalty scored) Quiñonez; (penalty scored) Edward Alvarino; (penalty missed) Hamlet Mina Pino; (penalty scored) Andres Felipe Andrade; (penalty missed) Jorge Banguero; (penalty scored) Nicolas Mosquera

Tied 2-2 on aggregate. América de Cali win 4-3 on penalties.

=== Final ===
31 January 2010	Universidad San Martín (Peru)	1–0	(Ecuador) ESPOLI	Estadio Mansiche, Trujillo
	Christian Cueva 71'

== 2011 Copa Ciudad de Trujillo ==
=== Standings ===
Pos	Team	Pld	W	D	L	GF	GA	GD	Pts	Qualification or relegation
1	(Peru) Universidad César Vallejo	2	1	1	0	2	1	+1	4	Champion
2	(Colombia) Millonarios	2	0	2	0	2	2	0	2	
3	(Peru) León de Huánuco	2	0	2	0	1	1	0	2	
4	(Peru) Melgar	2	0	1	1	0	1	−1	1	

=== First round ===
21 January 2011	Melgar (Peru)	0–0	(Peru) León de Huánuco	Estadio Mansiche, Trujillo

21 January 2011	Universidad César Vallejo (Peru)	1–1	(Colombia) Millonarios	Estadio Mansiche, Trujillo
20:15	Lee Andonaire 90+1'		Mayer Candelo 76'

=== Second round ===
23 January 2011	León de Huánuco (Peru)	1–1	(Colombia) Millonarios	Estadio Mansiche, Trujillo
	Harrison Otálvaro 55'		Juan Guillermo Domínguez 67'

23 January 2011	Universidad César Vallejo (Peru)	1–0	(Peru) Melgar	Estadio Mansiche, Trujillo
	Carlos De Castro 87'
