= Pedro Requena (footballer, born 1991) =

Peruvian footballer

Personal information
- Full name: Pedro Paulo Requena Cisneros
- Date of birth: 24 January 1991 (age 35)
- Place of birth: Lima, Peru
- Height: 1.80 m (5 ft 11 in)
- Position: Right back

Team information
- Current team: UTC Cajamarca
- Number: 25

Senior career*
Years	Team	Apps	(Gls)
2008–2010	Total Chalaco	26	(0)
2011–2016	Universidad César Vallejo	119	(3)
2017	Melgar	16	(0)
2018–2021	Universidad César Vallejo	64	(1)
2022	Carlos Stein	4	(0)
2023–	UTC Cajamarca	47	(0)

International career^{‡}
2013–	Peru	4	(0)
Medal record
Representing Peru
Association football
Copa America
Bronze medal – third place	Chile 2015
- * Club domestic league appearances and goals as of 27 October 2024 ‡ National team caps and goals as of 9 September 2015

Pedro Paulo Requena Cisneros (born 24 January 1991) is a Peruvian professional footballer who plays as a right back for UTC Cajamarca in the Liga 1.

== Career statistics ==
=== Club ===
As of match played 25 July 2024.

Club	Division	Season	League		Cup		Continental		Total	
Club	Division	Season	Apps	Goals	Apps	Goals	Apps	Goals	Apps	Goals
Total Chalaco	Torneo Descentralizado	2009	7	0	-		-		7	0
Total Chalaco	Torneo Descentralizado	2010	17	0	-		-		17	0
Total Chalaco	Total		24	0	0	0	0	0	24	0
Universidad César Vallejo	Torneo Descentralizado	2011	12	0	5	0	-		17	0
Universidad César Vallejo	Torneo Descentralizado	2012	12	1	-		-		12	1
Universidad César Vallejo	Torneo Descentralizado	2013	22	0	-		1	0	23	0
Universidad César Vallejo	Torneo Descentralizado	2014	12	0	13	0	5	0	30	0
Universidad César Vallejo	Torneo Descentralizado	2015	34	1	4	0	-		38	1
Universidad César Vallejo	Torneo Descentralizado	2016	27	1	-		1	0	28	1
Melgar	Torneo Descentralizado	2017	16	0	-		3	0	19	0
Universidad César Vallejo	Segunda División	2018	28	0	-		-		28	0
Universidad César Vallejo	Liga 1	2019	23	1	2	0	-		25	1
Universidad César Vallejo	Liga 1	2020	10	0	-		-		10	0
Universidad César Vallejo	Liga 1	2021	2	0	-		-		2	0
Universidad César Vallejo	Total		182	4	24	0	7	0	213	4
Carlos Stein	Liga 1	2022	4	0	-		-		4	0
UTC Cajamarca	Liga 1	2023	23	0	-		-		23	0
UTC Cajamarca	Liga 1	2024	17	0	-		-		17	0
UTC Cajamarca	Total		40	0	0	0	0	0	40	0
Career total			266	4	24	0	10	0	300	4
