= Beto da Silva =

Peruvian footballer (born 1996)

Personal information
- Full name: Luiz Humberto da Silva Silva
- Date of birth: 28 December 1996 (age 29)
- Place of birth: Lima, Peru
- Height: 1.81 m (5 ft 11 1/2 in)
- Position: Forward

Team information
- Current team: Deportivo Garcilaso
- Number: 30

Youth career
- 2003–2005: Internacional
- 2006–2010: Grêmio
- 2010: Universitario
- 2011: Universidad San Martín
- 2011–2012: Sporting Cristal

Senior career*
Years	Team	Apps	(Gls)
2013–2016	Sporting Cristal	32	(8)
2016	Jong PSV	27	(4)
2016–2017	PSV	0	(0)
2017–2018	Grêmio	13	(1)
2018	→ Argentinos Juniors (loan)	5	(0)
2018–2020	Tigres UANL	0	(0)
2019	→ Lobos BUAP (loan)	11	(1)
2019–2020	→ Deportivo La Coruña (loan)	7	(0)
2020–2022	Alianza Lima	10	(0)
2021–2022	→ UCV (loan)	17	(2)
2022–2023	UCV	35	(5)
2023–2024	FBC Melgar	10	(0)
2024-	→ ADT (loan)	24	(3)
2025	Cienciano	29	(4)
2026-	Deportivo Garcilaso	13	(5)

International career^{‡}
2011	Peru U15	3	(0)
2013	Peru U17	7	(3)
2011	Peru U-18	4	(2)
2015–2016	Peru U20	8	(2)
2016–2019	Peru	8	(1)
- * Club domestic league appearances and goals as of 20:57, 17 February 2020 (UTC) ‡ National team caps and goals as of 26 March 2019

Luiz Humberto da Silva Silva (born 28 December 1996), better known as Beto da Silva, is a Peruvian footballer who plays as a forward for the club Deportivo Garcilaso.

== Club career ==
=== Youth career ===
Da Silva was born in Lima, Peru, to a Brazilian father and a Peruvian mother. At the age of six, his family moved to Porto Alegre, Brazil, where he began playing for Internacional and later moving to Grêmio. In 2010, he moved back to Peru, where he had brief spells at Universitario and Universidad San Martín before joining Sporting Cristal youth team in 2011.

=== Sporting Cristal ===
Da Silva made his professional debut for Sporting Cristal on 19 June 2013, aged 16, in a derby match against Alianza Lima for the Torneo Descentralizado. On 30 August 2014, he scored his first professional goal, against Los Caimanes. He ended up the 2014 season with 2 goals in 14 matches, as Sporting Cristal finished as league champions. In the following year, he managed to score more 6 goals in 21 matches.

=== PSV Eindhoven ===
On 3 January 2016, Da Silva signed a two-and-a-half-year contract with PSV Eindhoven. He immediately joined Jong PSV, who plays on Eerste Divisie.

Da Silva made his debut for Jong PSV on 18 January, replacing Ramon Lundqvist at the 76th minute in a 2–0 victory against MVV Maastricht in Eerste Divisie. On February 1, he scored his first goal, the late in a 3–1 win over RKC Waalwijk. In July, he appeared in a pre-season friendly against FC Porto.

On 6 January 2017, Da Silva was promoted to PSV Eindhoven's first team. On 14 January, he was an unused substitute in a 2–0 home victory against S.B.V. Excelsior, in the Eredivisie.

=== Grêmio ===
On 20 January 2017, Da Silva returned to his childhood club Grêmio, signing a four-year contract.

==== Loan to Argentinos Juniors ====
On 19 January 2018, Da Silva joined Argentine Primera División side Argentinos Juniors on a one-and-a-half-year loan deal with a buyout option.

=== Tigres UANL ===
On 4 September 2018, Da Silva joined Liga MX side Tigres UANL.

==== Loan to Lobos BUAP ====
On 1 January 2019, Da Silva joined Liga MX side Lobos BUAP.

==== Loan to Deportivo La Coruña ====
On 2 September 2019, Da Silva returns to European football via a loan to Segunda División side Deportivo La Coruña for the entire 2019–20 season. The following 29 January, after seven goalless appearances, his loan was terminated.

== International career ==
Eligible to play for both Peru and Brazil through his descent, Da Silva represented Peru since the under-15 level. He was part of the Peru under-20 squad selected to play in the 2015 South American Youth Football Championship.

Da Silva made his senior debut on 23 May 2016, in a friendly match against Trinidad & Tobago, scoring the second goal in a 4–0 victory. Later, he was named in the 23-men squad to represent Peru in Copa América Centenario.

=== International goals ===
Score and Result list Peru's goal tally first

No.	Date	Venue	Opponent	Score	Result	Competition
1.	23 May 2016	Estadio Nacional de Lima, Lima, Peru	Trinidad and Tobago	2–0	4–0	Friendly

== Honours ==
Sporting Cristal

- Peruvian Primera División: 2014

Gremio

- 2017 Copa Libertadores

== Personal life ==
He is married with model Ivana Yturbe and they announced Ivana is pregnant on 30 May 2021.
