= Hansell Riojas =

Peruvian footballer (born 1991)

Personal information
- Full name: Hansell Argenis Riojas La Rosa
- Date of birth: 15 October 1991 (age 35)
- Place of birth: Callao, Peru
- Height: 1.85 m (6 ft 1 in)
- Position: Defender

Team information
- Current team: Sport Boys
- Number: 26

Youth career
- Alianza Lima

Senior career*
Years	Team	Apps	(Gls)
2011–2012	Sport Boys	13	(0)
2013	Deportivo Municipal	18	(0)
2014	Cienciano	40	(0)
2015–2017	Universidad César Vallejo	51	(3)
2017	Alianza Lima	28	(1)
2017	Belgrano	4	(0)
2018–2019	Alianza Lima	55	(2)
2020	Sport Boys	23	(1)
2021-2023	Cienciano	2	(1)
2024	Malacateco	15	(0)
2024	Unión Comercio	10	(0)
2025–	Sport Boys	24	(3)

International career^{‡}
2014–	Peru	4	(0)
Medal record
Representing Peru
Association football
Copa America
Bronze medal – third place	Chile 2015
- * Club domestic league appearances and goals as of 30 December 2025 ‡ National team caps and goals as of 31 May 2014

Hansell Argenis Riojas La Rosa (born 15 October 1991) is a Peruvian professional footballer who plays as a defender for Sport Boys.

== International career ==
He made his debut for Peru in a 3–0 defeat to England at Wembley Stadium on 30 May 2014. During the game, he was hit by a paper plane thrown from the crowd, with footage of the moment subsequently going viral.
