= Roberto Guizasola =

Peruvian footballer (born 1984)

Personal information
- Full name: Roberto Carlos Guizasola la Rosa
- Date of birth: 21 August 1984 (age 42)
- Place of birth: Lima, Peru
- Height: 1.78 m (5 ft 10 in)
- Position: Right back

Youth career
- Alianza Lima

Senior career*
Years	Team	Apps	(Gls)
2003–2007	Alianza Lima	57	(2)
2005	→ Coronel Bolognesi (loan)	1	(0)
2007	→ Sport Áncash (loan)	16	(1)
2008–2009	Cienciano	58	(3)
2009–2013	Juan Aurich	77	(0)
2010–2011	→ Rosario Central (loan)	17	(0)
2014–2016	Alianza Lima	71	(0)
2017	Sport Huancayo	12	(0)
2018–2019	UTC	60	(1)

International career
2008–2013	Peru	12	(0)
- * Club domestic league appearances and goals

Roberto Carlos Guizasola la Rosa (born 21 August 1984) is a Peruvian former professional footballer who played as a right back. He is the younger brother of Guillermo Guizasola.

== Club career ==
Guizasola made his debut for Alianza Lima on 11 February 2003 against Olimpia in the group stage of the Copa Libertadores. He entered match in the 46th minute for Guillermo Salas, and the match finished in a 1–1 draw.

On 2 February 2020, Guizasola announced his retirement from football.

== International career ==
Guizasola was called up to play in Sergio Markarián's first game as coach of Peru. This game was played in Toronto on 4 September 2010 against Canada. Guizasola played the whole match which finished 2–0 in favor of Peru.

== Career statistics ==
As of 13 September 2013.

Peru national team
Year	Apps	Goals
2008	1	0
2009	0	0
2010	4	0
2011	3	0
2012	2	0
2013	1	0
Total	11	0

== Honours ==
Alianza Lima

- Torneo Descentralizado: 2003, 2004, 2006

Juan Aurich

- Torneo Descentralizado: 2011
