= Torneo del Inca =

- Founded: 2011
- Abolished: 2015
- Region: Peru
- Teams: 32 (2011); 16 (2014)
- Last champions: Universidad César Vallejo
- Most championships: Alianza Lima; José Gálvez; Universidad César Vallejo (1 title each)
- 2015 season

The Torneo del Inca was a football competition in Peru played by the football clubs of the Primera División. It was founded in 2011 under the name Torneo Intermedio and was played as a domestic football cup competition between clubs of the first and second division in addition to amateur clubs from smaller leagues that compete in the Copa Perú. It was on hiatus until 2014 when it was reorganized under the name Torneo del Inca and played only between first division teams; its format was modified to feature a group stage and a final. Subsequent editions followed a similar format with a group stage and subsequent knockout rounds.

== History ==
=== 2011 ===
Logo for 2011 Copa Inca.

Due to the 2011 Copa América, at the end of the 2011 Torneo Descentralizado's first round, the Torneo Intermedio was played, with the participation of the 16 teams of the Primera División, 5 teams of the Segunda División, and 14 teams of the Copa Perú. The winners qualified for the 2012 Copa Federación against the 2011 Torneo Descentralizado champion.

=== 2014 ===
For the 2014 season, the 16 teams from the 2014 Torneo Descentralizado were divided in two groups of eight from which the first place teams in each respective group played a in the competition's final. The champion qualified to the 2015 Copa Libertadores as Peru 3 and the runner-up qualified to the 2015 Copa Sudamericana as Peru 4 if they maintained a position above ninth place in the 2014 Torneo Descentralizado

=== 2015 ===
The 2015 season featured the first division teams again but dividing them in 3 groups. The winners of each group advanced to the semifinals in addition to the best second-placed team.

== Champions ==
- (In bracket, title count):

Ed.	Season	Winner	Score	Runner-up	Venue	Winning manager
1	2011	José Gálvez (1)	1–1	Sport Áncash	Rosas Pampa, Huaraz	(Peru) Rafael Castillo
1	2011	José Gálvez (1)	6–2	Sport Áncash	Manuel Rivera Sanchez, Chimbote	(Peru) Rafael Castillo
2	2014	Alianza Lima (1)	2–2 (5–3 p)	Universidad San Martín	Miguel Grau, Callao	(Uruguay) Guillermo Sanguinetti
3	2015	Universidad César Vallejo (1)	3–1	Alianza Lima	Nacional, Lima	(Peru) Franco Navarro

== Titles by club ==
Rank	Club	Winners	Runners-up	Winning years	Runners-up years
1	Alianza Lima	1	1	2014	2015
1	José Gálvez	1	0	2011	—
1	Universidad César Vallejo	1	0	2015	—
—	Sport Áncash	0	1	—	2011
—	Universidad San Martín	0	1	—	2014

== Topscorers ==
Year	Player	Goals	Club
2011	(Argentina) Fabricio Lenci	6	Sport Áncash
2014	(Colombia) Luis Alberto Perea	12	Universidad San Martín
2015	(Colombia) Lionard Pajoy	7	Unión Comercio
2015	(Argentina) Maximiliano Giusti	7	León de Huánuco
