= Junior Viza =

Peruvian footballer (born 1985)

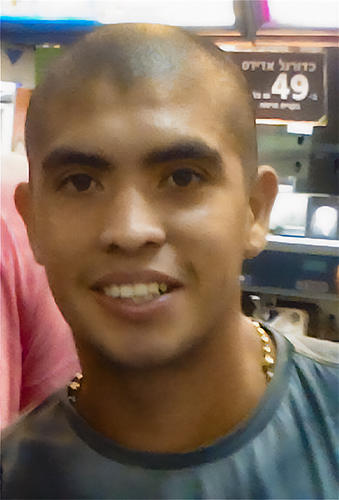

Personal information
- Full name: César Junior Viza Seminario
- Date of birth: 3 April 1985 (age 41)
- Place of birth: Lima, Peru
- Height: 1.72 m (5 ft 8 in)
- Position: Attacking midfielder

Team information
- Current team: Universidad San Martín
- Number: 27

Youth career
- Academia Cantolao

Senior career*
Years	Team	Apps	(Gls)
2003-2007	Alianza Lima	155	(22)
2008-2010	Beitar Jerusalem	33	(0)
2008-2009	→ Hapoel Petah Tikva (loan)	29	(3)
2010	Hapoel Petah Tikva	14	(0)
2011-2012	Alianza Lima	47	(4)
2013-2014	Juan Aurich	53	(4)
2015-2017	Universidad César Vallejo	53	(11)
2018	Cienciano	27	(6)
2019	Unión Huaral	20	(8)
2020	Llacuabamba	12	(0)
2021	Santos	16	(0)
2022	Alianza Universidad	18	(1)
2023-	Universidad San Martín	15	(4)

International career
2006	Peru	2	(0)
- * Club domestic league appearances and goals as of 10 August 2023

César Junior Viza Seminario (born 3 April 1985) is a Peruvian professional footballer who plays as an attacking midfielder for Club Deportivo Universidad de San Martín de Porres in the Peruvian Segunda División.

== Honours ==
Alianza Lima

- Torneo Descentralizado: 2003, 2004, 2006

Beitar Jerusalem

- Israeli Premier League: 2007–08
- Israel State Cup: 2007–08
- Toto Cup Al: 2009–10
