= Ramón Rodríguez (footballer) =

Peruvian footballer (born 1977)

Personal information
- Full name: Ramón Rodríguez del Solar
- Date of birth: 8 August 1977 (age 49)
- Place of birth: Pilcopata, Cuzco, Peru
- Height: 1.73 m (5 ft 8 in)
- Position: Striker

Senior career*
Years	Team	Apps	(Gls)
1995–2003	Cienciano		
2004	FBC Melgar	47	(11)
2005–2006	Cienciano		
2007	Total Clean	16	(3)
2007	Deportivo Municipal	16	(3)
2008	Sport Boys	12	(1)
2008	Alianza Atlético	12	(2)
2009	Inti Gas	4	(0)
2009–2010	Cobresol	26	(18)
2011–2012	Real Garcilaso	46	(11)
2013	Cienciano	41	(18)
2014–2015	Real Garcilaso	61	(26)
2016–2018	Cienciano	68	(32)
- * Club domestic league appearances and goals

Ramón Rodríguez del Solar (born 8 August 1977) is a Peruvian former professional footballer who played as a striker. In his long career, Rodríguez has played for the likes of Cienciano, FBC Melgar, Total Clean, Deportivo Municipal, Sport Boys, Alianza Atlético, Inti Gas Deportes, Cobresol, Real Garcilaso, and for Santa Rosa. His nicknamed is El Ratón (The Mouse)

== Career ==
Rodríguez was born in Pilcopata, Cuzco. He started his professional career in Torneo Descentralizado with Cienciano, where he played from 1995 to 2003. He managed to score for the Cuzco based club in the second leg of the 2001 Championship Playoffs against Alianza Lima in the 83rd minute, which then forced the match to a penalty shoot-out. His club lost the Championship 4–2 on penalties.

He made his league debut for Real Garcilaso in the second round (the first round was played by reserve players due to the Player's strike) of the 2012 season against Alianza Lima. Playing at the Inca Garcilaso de la Vega stadium, Rodríguez made history in that match with Real Garcilaso by scoring the club's first goal at home in the top-flight, the Torneo Descentralizado. His goal came in the 9th minute of the match by heading in a cross from Eduardo Uribe, and later in the second half Rodríguez provided an assist for Andy Pando's winning goal, which resulted in a 2–1 over the runners-up of the previous season. This match was Real Garcilaso's first home win ever in the Descentralizado.

== Honours ==
Cienciano

- Clausura: 2001, 2006
- Copa Sudamericana: 2003
- Apertura: 2005

Cobresol

- Peruvian Second Division: 2010

Real Garcilaso

- Copa Perú: 2011

Individual

- Second Division Top Scorer: 2010
