= Danilo Carando =

Argentine footballer

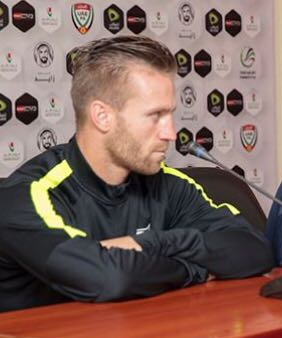

Personal information
- Full name: Danilo Ezequiel Carando
- Date of birth: 5 August 1988 (age 38)
- Place of birth: Córdoba, Argentina
- Height: 1.82 m (6 ft 0 in)
- Position: Forward

Team information
- Current team: Club Deportivo Universidad César Vallejo
- Number: 9

Youth career
- Talleres de Córdoba

Senior career*
Years	Team	Apps	(Gls)
2008–2009	Talleres de Córdoba	0	(0)
2009	Ñublense	3	(0)
2010	Astra	6	(1)
2011	Gimnasia y Esgrima	6	(0)
2011	Sportivo Patria	6	(0)
2012	Sportivo Carapeguá	7	(1)
2012–2013	Oriente Petrolero	39	(15)
2013	Estudiantes Tecos	6	(0)
2014	Liga de Loja	37	(9)
2015	Real Garcilaso	32	(10)
2016	Al Ahli	1	(0)
2016	→ Qatar SC (loan)	8	(2)
2016	Unión Santa Fe	2	(0)
2017	Real Garcilaso	39	(19)
2018	Al-Fujairah	0	(0)
2018	Universidad Católica	10	(1)
2019–2020	Real Garcilaso	60	(24)
2021	SCR Altach	3	(2)
2021–2024	Cienciano	71	(23)
2024	Deportivo Garcilaso	15	(1)
2025-	Club Deportivo Universidad César Vallejo	2	(1)
- * Club domestic league appearances and goals as of 2 September 2023

Danilo Ezequiel Carando (born 5 August 1988) is an Argentine footballer‚ who plays as a forward for Club Deportivo Universidad César Vallejo.

In January 2010 he was signed by Astra. In January 2017, Danilo Carando returned to Real Garcilaso.
