= Víctor Cedrón =

Peruvian footballer (born 1993)

Personal information
- Full name: Víctor Andrés Cedron Zurita
- Date of birth: 6 October 1993 (age 33)
- Place of birth: Trujillo, Peru
- Height: 1.73 m (5 ft 8 in)
- Position: Winger

Team information
- Current team: Asociación Deportiva Tarma
- Number: 10

Youth career
- UCV

Senior career*
| Years | Team | Apps | (Gls) |
| 2011–2013 | UCV | 70 | (9) |
| 2014–2015 | Alianza Lima | 26 | (2) |
| 2015–2016 | César Vallejo | 18 | (1) |
| 2016–2017 | Juan Aurich | 41 | (12) |
| 2017 | Melgar | 35 | (3) |
| 2018 | Figueirense | 2 | (0) |
| 2019 | Unión Comercio | 11 | (0) |
| 2019-2021 | UCV | 41 | (2) |
| 2021 | Cusco FC | 13 | (3) |
| 2022 | Deportivo Binacional | 32 | (5) |
| 2023 | Cienciano | 0 | (0) |
| 2023- | Asociación Deportiva Tarma | 71 | (10) |

International career^{‡}
| 2012–2013 | Peru U20 | 4 | (0) |
| 2015 | Peru U22 | 3 | (0) |
| 2014 | Peru | 2 | (0) |
- * Club domestic league appearances and goals as of 30 December 2025 ‡ National team caps and goals as of 5:00, 21 July 2015 (UTC)

Víctor Andrés Cedron Zurita (born 6 October 1993) is a Peruvian footballer who plays as a winger for Asociación Deportiva Tarma in the Peruvian Primera División.

== Club career ==
Victor Cedron joined the Universidad César Vallejo first team in January 2011. His league debut in Torneo Descentralizado came quickly on 13 February 2011 in matchday 1 at home to Colegio Nacional Iquitos. Manager Víctor Rivera put him in the match for Juan Pablo Vergara late in the game to finish off the 3–0 win for his side. He played his first game as a starter in his third league appearance, but he could not help side avoid a 3–1 defeat away to León de Huánuco.
