= Carlos Flores (footballer, born 1988) =

Peruvian footballer

Personal information
- Full name: Carlos Javier Flores Córdova
- Date of birth: 9 May 1988 (age 38)
- Place of birth: Lima, Peru
- Height: 1.74 m (5 ft 9 in)
- Position: Midfielder

Youth career
- –2006: Alianza Lima

Senior career*
Years	Team	Apps	(Gls)
2007	Alianza Lima	3	(0)
2008–2011	Atlético Minero	68	(10)
2012	Real Garcilaso	17	(0)
2013	León de Huánuco	33	(1)
2014–2015	Real Garcilaso	47	(3)
2016–2017	Comerciantes Unidos	83	(8)
2018–2019	Deportivo Municipal	53	(2)
2020	Carlos A. Mannucci		
2021–2022	Deportivo Binacional		
2023	Deportivo Coopsol		
2024	Deportivo Moquegua		

International career
2004–2005	Peru U-17	3	(0)
2006–2007	Peru U-20	0	(0)
- * Club domestic league appearances and goals

Carlos Javier Flores Córdova (born 9 May 1988) is a Peruvian professional footballer who plays as a midfielder.

== Club career ==
Carlos Flores joined the Alianza Lima first team in January 2007. Later that season on 8 August 2007 he made his Torneo Descentralizado league debut coming on as a substitute in the 1–1 draw away to Sport Áncash. In his third and last match for Alianza he made his first league start, but could not help his side avoid a 1–2 defeat at home to Cienciano. He finished his debut season with only three league appearances.

The following season in January he joined Atlético Minero. In his first season with the Matucana club he made 11 league appearances. The following season Flores scored his first league goal in a 3–1 away win over Hijos de Acosvinchos for Round 8.

Later in January 2012 Carlos Flores joined Real Garcilaso.

== International career ==
Flores was part of the Peru U17 squad that participated in the 2005 FIFA U-17 World Cup.
