= Federico Freire =

Argentine footballer

Personal information
- Full name: Federico Freire Pisano
- Date of birth: 6 November 1990 (age 36)
- Place of birth: Buenos Aires, Argentina
- Height: 1.84 m (6 ft 1/2 in)
- Position: Midfielder

Team information
- Current team: San Telmo

Senior career*
Years	Team	Apps	(Gls)
2010–2013	Vélez Sarsfield	11	(0)
2013–2014	Catania	1	(0)
2014–2015	Arsenal de Sarandí	5	(0)
2015	USM Porres	29	(2)
2016	Olimpo	4	(0)
2017–2018	Sportivo Estudiantes	18	(0)
2018–2019	Gimnasia Jujuy	15	(0)
2019–	San Telmo	6	(0)
- * Club domestic league appearances and goals as of 15:23, 21 September 2019 (UTC)

Federico Freire (born 6 November 1990) is an Argentine footballer who currently plays as a midfielder for Club Atlético San Telmo.

== Club career ==
=== Vélez Sarsfield ===
Freire began his professional career with Argentine outfit, Vélez Sarsfield in 2011, earning his first call-up on 29 May 2011, in a 2–1 loss against Tigre. He made his professional debut in a 1–1 home draw with Colón on 27 November 2011. He made 11 official league appearances for the Argentine outfit before moving to the Italian Serie A with Catania.

=== Calcio Catania ===
On 5 July 2013, Freire officially signed for Catania, although the 22-year-old midfielder had already signed the contract on 10 June, but it was only deposited in the Lega Serie A today. He was signed on a Bosman free transfer and does not require a non-EU transfer being that the player also obtains a Spanish passport. He made his debut in Serie A match against Torino on 24 November 2013, as a substitute in the last 6 minutes. However, he failed to appear any other matches for Catania in a nearly half-year.

=== Arsenal de Sarandí ===
On 3 February 2014, Freire returned to Argentina for Arsenal, ending a short-term career at Catania. Although he was brought to the team by coach Gustavo Alfaro he failed to play many minutes. On April 15, 2014, coach Alfaro was discharged from Arsenal and coach Martín Palermo was hired. Quickly, Martín Palermo noticed Freire's skills, and played for the first team two times for the local tournament and six times for the Copa Libertadores.

== Honours ==
Vélez Sarsfield

- Argentine Primera División (2): 2011 Clausura, 2012 Inicial
