= Marcos Miers =

Paraguayan footballer (born 1990)

Personal information
- Full name: Marcos David Miers
- Date of birth: 24 March 1990 (age 36)
- Place of birth: Villa Elisa, Paraguay
- Height: 1.85 m (6 ft 1 in)
- Position: Centre-back

Team information
- Current team: Sol de América
- Number: 22

Youth career
- –2010: Nacional

Senior career*
Years	Team	Apps	(Gls)
2009–2018	Nacional	133	(5)
2015	→ Alianza Lima (loan)	12	(0)
2016	→ Sport Boys (loan)	8	(0)
2017	→ Independiente CG (loan)	5	(0)
2018	Macará	11	(0)
2018–2019	Sportivo Luqueño	7	(0)
2019	Deportivo Lara	11	(0)
2019–2022	Aldosivi	32	(0)
2022–	Sol de América	2	(0)
- * Club domestic league appearances and goals as of 19:44, 6 September 2022 (UTC)

Marcos David Miers (born 24 March 1990) is a Paraguayan footballer who plays as a centre-back for Paraguayan club Sol de América.

== Honours ==
Nacional

- Paraguayan Primera División: 2009 Clausura, 2011 Apertura, 2013 Apertura
