= Juan Morales (Peruvian footballer) =

Peruvian footballer (born 1989)

Personal information
- Full name: Juan Gustavo Waldemar Morales Coronado
- Date of birth: 6 March 1989 (age 37)
- Place of birth: Pisco, Peru
- Height: 1.70 m (5 ft 7 in)
- Position: Midfielder

Team information
- Current team: Sport Boys
- Number: 17

Senior career*
Years	Team	Apps	(Gls)
2010–2016	UCV	117	(0)
2016	Juan Aurich	11	(0)
2017	Ayacucho	41	(0)
2018–2019	Unión Comercio	67	(1)
2020–2021	Alianza Universidad	45	(0)
2021–2022	Ayacucho FC	31	(0)
2023–	Sport Boys	63	(0)

International career^{‡}
2015	Peru U22	3	(0)
2012	Peru	2	(0)
- * Club domestic league appearances and goals as of 27 October 2024 ‡ National team caps and goals as of 21 July 2015

Juan Gustavo Waldemar Morales Coronado (born 6 March 1989) is a Peruvian footballer who plays as a midfielder for Sport Boys in the Liga 1.

== Club career ==
Morales joined the CD Universidad César Vallejo first team in January 2010. He had to wait until the last match of the 2010 season to make his league debut in the Torneo Descentralizado. Interim manager Benjamín Navarro included him in the starting eleven as his debut eventually finished in a 2–0 home win over FBC Melgar.

== International career ==
Morales was called up for the first time to play for the Peru national team on 10 August 2012 in an upcoming friendly.
