= Mauricio Montes =

Peruvian footballer (born 1982)

Personal information
- Full name: Mauricio Alejandro Montes Sanguinetti
- Date of birth: 22 June 1982 (age 44)
- Place of birth: Lima, Peru
- Height: 1.81 m (5 ft 11 in)
- Position: Centre forward

Team information
- Current team: Ecosem

Senior career*
| Years | Team | Apps | (Gls) |
| 2001 | Bella Esperanza | ? | (4) |
| 2002–2004 | Alianza Lima | 20 | (0) |
| 2005 | Atlético Universidad | 38 | (7) |
| 2006–2008 | Universidad San Martín | 50 | (5) |
| 2008–2010 | Cienciano | 82 | (25) |
| 2010–2012 | Juan Aurich | 49 | (10) |
| 2013 | Real Garcilaso | 39 | (14) |
| 2014 | Alianza Lima | 29 | (5) |
| 2015–2016 | UCV | 63 | (16) |
| 2017 | Sport Huancayo | 36 | (18) |
| 2018–2020 | Ayacucho | 104 | (48) |
| 2021-2022 | Cusco FC | 29 | (10) |
| 2022 | Alianza Atlético | 12 | (0) |

International career
| 2019 | Peru U23 | 3 | (1) |
- * Club domestic league appearances and goals as of 30 October 2022 (UTC)

Mauricio Alejandro Montes Sanguinetti (born 22 June 1982 in Lima) is a Peruvian footballer who plays as a striker for Cusco FC in the Torneo Descentralizado.

== Club career ==
=== Early career ===
Montes played for Segunda División Peruana team C.D. Bella Esperanza in the 2001 season. He scored 4 goals and his club finished in third that season.

=== Juan Aurich ===
On July 27, 2010, it was announced that Montes rescinded his contract with Cienciano due to unpaid wages and signed for Club Juan Aurich. It was reported that he also received a contract offer from his previous club Alianza Lima, but he preferred the one offered by Juan Aurich. He joined the Chiclayo based club along with Nelinho Quina for the second part of the 2010 season. On September 18, 2010, he made his debut for Juan Aurich as a starter in a league match against León de Huánuco, which ended in a 1-1 draw. In the 2011 season Montes scored a hat-trick in an away league match against Sport Boys, which finished 5-0 in favor of Juan Aurich.

== Honours ==
=== Club ===
Juan Aurich

- Torneo Descentralizado (1): 2011
