= Daniel Chávez (Peruvian footballer) =

Peruvian footballer (born 1988)

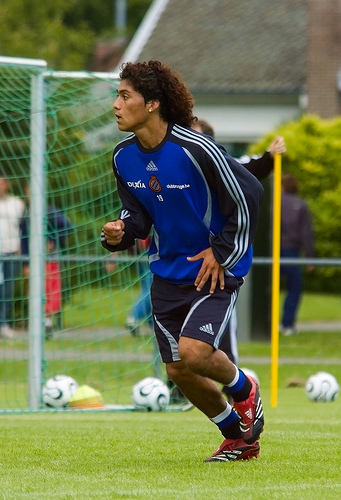

Personal information
- Full name: Daniel Mackensi Chávez Castillo
- Date of birth: 8 January 1988 (age 38)
- Place of birth: Callao, Peru
- Height: 1.76 m (5 ft 9 in)
- Position: Forward

Youth career
- 2002–2006: Academia Cantolao

Senior career*
Years	Team	Apps	(Gls)
2006–2010	Club Brugge	32	(7)
2010–2011	Westerlo	24	(3)
2011	Oțelul Galați	0	(0)
2012	Union Comercio	38	(11)
2013–2016	Universidad César Vallejo	167	(39)
2017	Melgar	16	(3)
2017–2019	Universitario	22	(2)
2019	→ Academia Cantolao (loan)	9	(1)
2020	Deportivo Llacuabamba	11	(3)
2021	Club Deportivo Los Chankas	4	(0)

International career
2008–2015	Peru	16	(1)
- * Club domestic league appearances and goals as of 20:19, 16 August 2020 (UTC)

Daniel Mackensi Chávez Castillo (born 8 January 1988 in Callao) is a Peruvian footballer.

== Attributes ==
His preferred position is centre forward, however he is more effective on the wings because of his pace and acceleration, combined with his good crossing skills.

=== International goals ===
#	Date	Venue	Opponent	Score	Result	Competition
1.	4 September 2015	RFK Stadium, Washington DC	United States	1–2	Loss	Friendly
