= Eduardo Uribe =

Peruvian footballer (born 1985)

Personal information
- Full name: Eduardo Alberto Uribe Oshiro
- Date of birth: 2 September 1985 (age 41)
- Place of birth: Lima, Peru
- Height: 1.80 m (5 ft 11 in)
- Position: Midfielder

Team information
- Current team: Sport Boys
- Number: 24

Youth career
- Alianza Lima

Senior career*
Years	Team	Apps	(Gls)
2003–2005	Alianza Lima		(0)
2005–2006	Unión Huaral		(0)
2007–2008	Coronel Bolognesi	75	(4)
2009–2010	Alianza Lima	55	(1)
2011	Juan Aurich	26	(1)
2012	Real Garcilaso	45	(3)
2013	Sporting Cristal	34	(0)
2014	UT Cajamarca	27	(0)
2015	Melgar	17	(2)
2016	Alianza Lima	30	(0)
2017	Carlos A. Mannucci	23	(4)
2018	Unión Comercio	30	(1)
2019–	Sport Boys	36	(1)
Medal record
Juan Aurich
Winner	Peruvian League	2011
FBC Melgar
Winner	Peruvian League	2015
- * Club domestic league appearances and goals as of 02:58, 17 January 2022 (UTC)

Eduardo Alberto "Lalo" Uribe Oshiro (born 2 September 1985 in Lima) is a Peruvian footballer currently playing for Sport Boys in the Peruvian Primera División. He mainly plays as a central midfielder.

== Honours ==
=== Club ===
Juan Aurich

- Torneo Descentralizado (1): 2011

Melgar

- Torneo Descentralizado (1): 2015
