= Alfredo Ramúa =

Argentine footballer

Personal information
- Full name: Alfredo Sebastián Ramúa
- Date of birth: September 4, 1986 (age 40)
- Place of birth: Villa Gobernador Gálvez, Argentina
- Height: 1.65 m (5 ft 5 in)
- Position: Midfielder

Team information
- Current team: Cienciano
- Number: 55

Youth career
- Newell's Old Boys

Senior career*
| Years | Team | Apps | (Gls) |
| 2007 | Real Arroyo Seco | 6 | (1) |
| 2007–2009 | Aldosivi | 21 | (0) |
| 2009–2010 | Sportivo Las Parejas | 14 | (0) |
| 2010–2011 | CNI | 42 | (3) |
| 2011–2012 | Olmedo | 43 | (8) |
| 2012 | Técnico Universitario | 19 | (0) |
| 2012–2013 | Aragua | 10 | (0) |
| 2013–2015 | Real Garcilaso | 108 | (17) |
| 2015–2016 | Sporting Cristal | 41 | (4) |
| 2017–2019 | Real Garcilaso | 117 | (23) |
| 2020–2023 | Cusco | 73 | (5) |
| 2023– | Cienciano | 72 | (1) |
- * Club domestic league appearances and goals as of 30 December 2025

Alfredo Sebastián Ramúa (born September 4, 1986, in Argentina) is an Argentine footballer currently playing for Cienciano of the Peruvian Liga 1.

== Honours ==
Sporting Cristal

- Torneo Descentralizado: 2016

Cusco FC

- Liga 2: 2022
