= Estadio Garcilaso =

Stadium in Cusco, Peru

Coordinates: 13.525°S 71.966°W

- Interactive map of Estadio Garcilaso
- Full name: Estadio Inca Garcilaso de la Vega
- Location: Cusco, Peru
- Elevation: 3,362 m (11,030 ft)
- Owner: Instituto Peruano del Deporte
- Operator: Gobierno Regional Cusco
- Capacity: 45,056; 34,500 (international)
- Surface: Grass
- Field size: 105 x 68 m

Construction
- Built: 1958
- Opened: 1958
- Renovated: 2004
- Expanded: 2004

Tenants
- Cienciano (Liga 1) (1950–present); Garcilaso (Liga 1) (1957–present); Cusco FC (Liga 1) (2009–present); Peru national football team (selected matches)

Estadio Inca Garcilaso de la Vega, commonly known as Estadio Garcilaso, is Cusco's principal stadium and the home venue of the local football teams Cienciano, Deportivo Garcilaso and Cusco FC, all of which play in the Peruvian Primera División. The stadium was named after the Peruvian mestizo Inca Garcilaso de la Vega and inaugurated in 1958, with an initial capacity of 30,000. It is owned by the Peruvian Sports Institute (IPD). The stadium has a current capacity of 45,056.

== History ==
The stadium was constructed in 1958 with a capacity of 22,000. The increase in spectator capacity came after CONMEBOL chose Peru to host the Copa América 2004, prompting the Peruvian government to invest in a five-million dollar renovation program for its stadia. Its renovation cost approximately $1,720,000, which helped boost its official spectator capacity to 42,056. Due to its high elevation, it only hosted one game in the tournament, being the third place play-off between Colombia and Uruguay, in which Uruguay won. Thanks to the event, the city of Cusco received even more tourists than it already receives as Peru's top tourist destination.

In 2013, the stadium was closed for a renovation where its capacity would increase to 45,000, have sun shades over its spectator seats, and have the supports covered. The project would cost 52 million soles. It later increased to 60 millions for a first stage alone. Due to a lack of budget, the initial plan was not implemented and renovation was alter for the stadium was instead given a new entrance, a few luxury boxes, new seating, and a more clean exterior. The stadium is the third largest in Peru.

== 2004 Copa America ==
Date	Time	Team #1	Score	Team #2	Round
24 July 2004	19:45	Colombia	1–2	Uruguay	Third place play-off

== See also ==
- Peru national football team
- List of Peruvian stadiums
