= Club Deportivo Universidad César Vallejo =

Association football club in Peru

Universidad César Vallejo
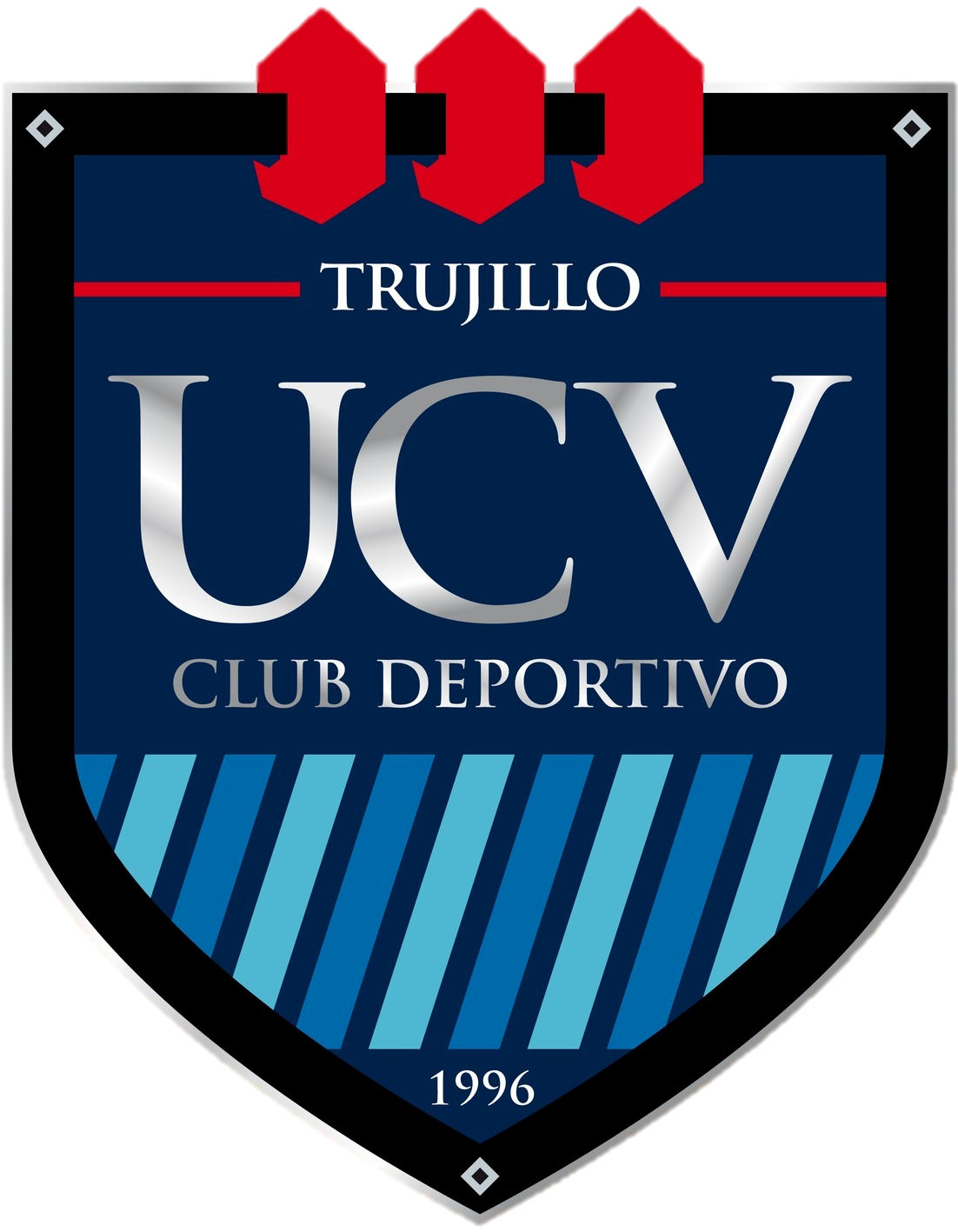
- Full name: Club Deportivo Universidad César Vallejo
- Nicknames: La UCV; La Vallejo; Los Poetas (The Poets); La Naranja del Norte
- Founded: January 6, 1996; 30 years ago
- Ground: Estadio Mansiche
- Capacity: 25,036
- Manager: Pablo Bengoechea
- League: Liga 3
- 2024: Liga 1, 17th of 18 (relegated)
- Website: www.ucvclub.com
Home colours	Away colours	Third colours

Club Deportivo Universidad César Vallejo is a Peruvian professional football club based in Trujillo. The club was founded on January 6, 1996 and was promoted in 2003, through the Copa Perú, to the Peruvian First Division and relegated in 2005. In 2007, they were Segunda División champions and were promoted to the first division again. The team currently plays in the Liga 2. Universidad César Vallejo has a long-standing rivalry with Carlos A. Mannucci known as "El Clásico Trujillano".

The club's greatest accomplishment was winning the 2015 Torneo del Inca, defeating defending champions, Alianza Lima. It has also won the Peruvian Segunda División in 2007 and 2018, as well as the Copa Perú in 2003. The club is named after the Peruvian poet, César Vallejo and is part of the César Vallejo University of Trujillo.

== History ==
The club was founded on January 6, 1996 representing Cesar Vallejo University and first participated in the championship of the third division of Trujillo at the end of 1996 and the team managed to crown champion of the tournament in 1997. In the year 1998, champion of the second division was crowned of Trujillo and won the privilege to participate, at the age of two years since foundation. Vallejo participated for the first time in the tournament of first division in the year 1999. They did quite well and even occupied the third position of the tournament. In its second year in first division, Vallejo had the respect of the large teams of the city was won of Trujillo, like the Carlos A. Mannucci, Deportivo UPAO, Alfonso Ugarte de Chiclín, among others. To surprise of many came, they fight the title with the Deportivo UPAO and achieved the subchampionship.

In its campaign 2001 came be Departamental, Provincial, and Local champion. In the regional phase of the Copa Perú, was faced to the traditional UTC and José Gálvez of Chimbote to whom was defeated. Then, in the encounters by the national phase left on the road to the Atlético Grau and in the great end the Poets fell for penalties and Coronel Bolognesi went on to win the Copa Peru.

The following year would repeat a great campaign but on the national phase Atlético Grau would leave it on the road. In the 2003 it achieved the desired title and its income increased after facing to worthy rival of different regions of the country and to conquer in the great end to the Deportivo Educación of Abancay in the National Stadium.

The club struggled during the 2004 and 2005 seasons in the first division and was relegated to 2nd division. During the 2007 season, the club participate in the Second Division of the Peruvian soccer, in which it obtained promotion back to top division, after participating against teams as Universidad San Marcos, Hijos de Acosvinchos, UTC and Atlético Minero. In November 2012 the club qualified for the edition 2013 of the Copa Libertadores where they were eliminated in the preliminary round. During the 2013 season it qualified to the 2014 Copa Sudamericana. The team advanced to the quarter-finals and lost to Atlético Nacional 2–0 on aggregate. The club placed 5th in the tournament.

On April 27, 2015, they won the 2015 Torneo del Inca as they beat Alianza Lima 1–3 with goals of Mauricio Montes, Víctor Cedrón and Daniel Chávez. This is Universidad César Vallejo first major title. From 2021 to the present, they qualified for every Copa Libertadores or Copa Sudamericana, qualifying for the Copa Libertadores from 2021–2022 and Sudamericana in 2023 and 2024.

== Stadium ==
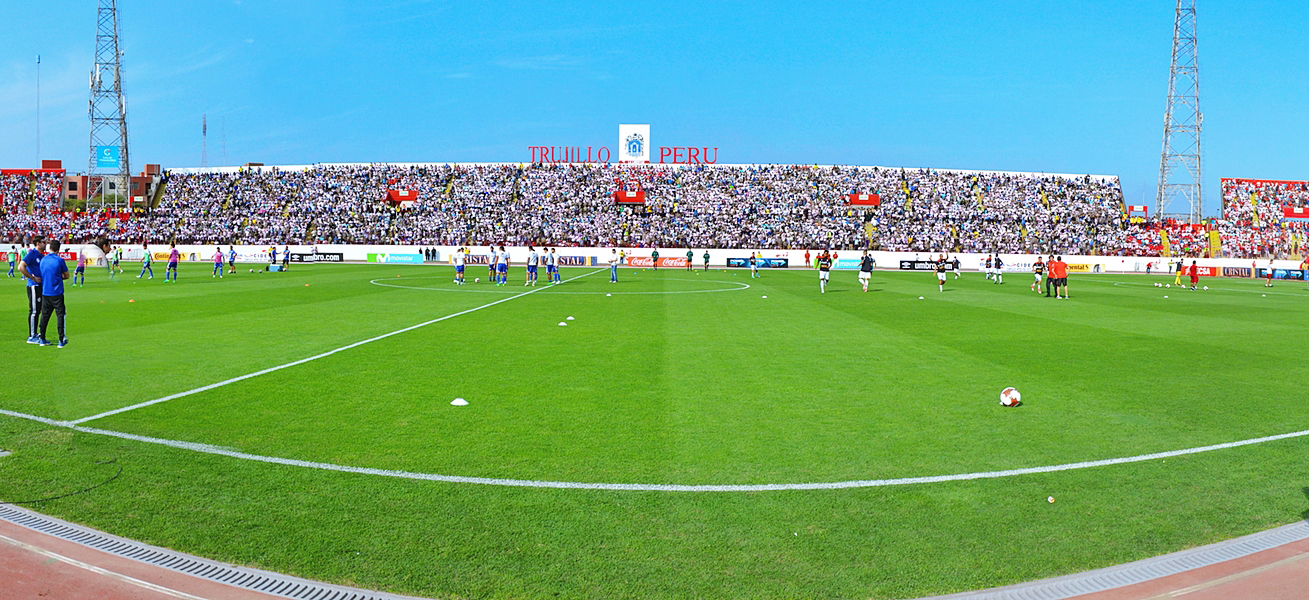
Estadio Mansiche

César Vallejo's home stadium Estadio César Acuña Peralta. The stadium was constructed in 1944 and hosted the 2004 Copa América, 2005 FIFA U-17 World Championship and the 2013 Bolivarian Games. It is part of the greater Mansiche Sports Complex in the area. The stadium has a capacity of 25,036.

== Colours and badge ==
The club's colors are blue, white and red just as the university's colours. Since its promotion to the first division, the club has used three badges. The first badge had the club's initials with the university's name along the oval-shaped outline and lasted until 2009. The second badge only modified the center of the badge by adding a book next to the initials of the club and was first used in 2010. The third badge was a complete change, taking the shape of shield with the red claws of a griffin placed on the top. The significance of the griffin is due to the city of Trujillo coat of arms displaying one. Moreover, the badge employed by the football club displays the team name as Universidad César Vallejo Club de Fútbol to distinguish it from the club's other sports teams.

Universidad César Vallejo's badge, 2010–12

Current badge

== Honours ==
=== Senior titles ===
Keys

- Record
- ^{(s)} Shared record

Type	Competition	Titles	Runner-up	Winning years	Runner-up years
National (League)	Segunda División	2	1	2007, 2018	2017
National (League)	Copa Perú	1	1	2003	2001
National (Cups)	Torneo del Inca	1	—	2015	—
Regional (League)	Región II	2	1	2001, 2002	2003
Regional (League)	Liga Departamental de La Libertad	3	—	2001, 2002, 2003	—
Regional (League)	Liga Provincial de Trujillo	3	—	2001, 2002, 2003	—
Regional (League)	Liga Distrital de Trujillo	1	1	2001	1999
Regional (League)	Segunda Distrital de Trujillo	1	—	1998	—
Regional (League)	Tercera Distrital de Trujillo	1	—	1997	—

=== Under-20 team ===
Type	Competition	Titles	Runner-up	Winning years	Runner-up years
National (League)	Torneo de Promoción y Reservas	1	—	2010	—

=== Friendlies ===
Type	Competition	Titles	Runner-up	Winning years	Runner-up years
International (Cup)	Copa Sebastián Abreu	1	—	2023	—
International (Cup)	Copa Jorge Bava	1	—	2023	—
International (Cup)	Copa Ciudad de Trujillo	1	—	2011	—

== Performance in CONMEBOL competitions ==
CD Universidad César Vallejo in South American football
- Club: Club Deportivo Universidad César Vallejo
- Seasons played: 7
- Most appearances: Ronald Quinteros (14)
- Top scorer: Andy Pando (4)
- First entry: 2010 Copa Sudamericana
- Latest entry: 2023 Copa Sudamericana

Competition	A	P	W	D	L	GF	GA	DG	Pts
Copa Libertadores	4	8	0	3	5	2	9	−7	3
Copa Sudamericana	3	12	3	3	6	14	17	−3	12

A = appearances, P = matches played, W = won, D = drawn, L = lost, GF = goals for, GA = goals against, DG = difference goals, Pts = points.

Season	Competition	Round	Country	Club	Home	Away	Aggregate	Ref
2010	Copa Sudamericana	First Round	(Ecuador)	Barcelona SC	1–2	1–3	2–5	
2011	Copa Sudamericana	First Round	(Colombia)	Santa Fe	1–1	0–2	1–3	
2013	Copa Libertadores	First Stage	(Colombia)	Deportes Tolima	1–1	0–1	1–2	
2014	Copa Sudamericana	First Stage	(Colombia)	Millonarios	2–2	2–1	4–3	
2014	Copa Sudamericana	Second Stage	(Bolivia)	Universitario de Sucre	3–0	2–2	5–2	
2014	Copa Sudamericana	Round 16	(Brazil)	Bahia	2–0	0–2	2–2 (7–6 p)	
2014	Copa Sudamericana	Quarter-finals	(Colombia)	Atlético Nacional	0–1	0–1	0–2	
2016	Copa Libertadores	First Stage	(Brazil)	São Paulo	1–1	0–1	1–2	
2021	Copa Libertadores	First Stage	(Venezuela)	Caracas FC	0–0	0–2	0–2	
2022	Copa Libertadores	First Stage	(Paraguay)	Olimpia	0–1	0–2	0–3	
2023	Copa Sudamericana	First Stage	(Peru)	Binacional	3–1			

== Current squad ==
Note: Flags indicate national team as defined under FIFA eligibility rules; some limited exceptions apply. Players may hold more than one non-FIFA nationality.

No.	Pos.	Nation	Player
12	GK	PER	Máximo Rabines
1	GK	PER	Josue Vargas
—	GK	PER	William Falcón
31	DF	PER	Eduardo Caballero
32	DF	PER	Jefferson Portales
2	DF	PER	Juan Quiñones
5	DF	ARG	Fernando Da Rosa
22	DF	PER	Bryan Córdova
27	DF	PER	Joel Quispe
14	DF	PER	Pedro Requena
4	MF	PER	Ángel Romero
17	MF	PER	Juan Morales (captain)
8	MF	PER	Miguel Cornejo

No.	Pos.	Nation	Player
—	MF	PER	Diego Ulloa
80	MF	PER	Valentino Sandoval
23	MF	ARG	Patricio Núñez
24	FW	PER	Stefano Olaya
10	FW	PER	Alejandro Ramírez
11	FW	PER	Alexis Rojas
77	FW	ECU	Jardel Córtez
18	FW	PER	Diether Vásquez
7	FW	PER	Hideyoshi Arakaki
15	FW	PER	Guillermo Grández
90	FW	PER	Alexander Succar
9	FW	ARG	Danilo Carando
20	FW	PER	Fernando Paiva

=== Out on loan ===
Note: Flags indicate national team as defined under FIFA eligibility rules; some limited exceptions apply. Players may hold more than one non-FIFA nationality.

No.	Pos.	Nation	Player
—	MF	ECU	Jairo Vélez (at Universitario de Deportes for the 2025 season)

== Managers ==
Name	From	To	Honours
(Peru) Andres Esquerre	2001	2003	1 Copa Perú
(Peru) Juan Caballero	2004	2005	
(Peru) Franco Navarro	2005	2005	
(Peru) Benjamín Navarro	2006	2006	
(Peru) Roberto Arrelucea	2007	2008	1 Segunda División
(Uruguay) Mario Viera	2009	2010	
(Peru) Víctor Rivera	2011	2013	1 Copa Ciudad de Trujillo
(Peru) Franco Navarro	2014	2016	1 Torneo del Inca
(Argentina) Ángel Comizzo	2016	2016	
(Peru) Francisco Cortez	2017	2017	
(Peru) José del Solar	December 2017	October 2022	1 Segunda División
(Uruguay) Sebastián Abreu	November 2022		1 Copa Sebastián Abreu, 1 Copa Jorge Bava

== See also ==
- List of football clubs in Peru
- Peruvian football league system
