= Alianza Lima =

Association baseball club in Peru

- Full name: Club Alianza Lima
- Nicknames: El Equipo del Pueblo (The People's Team); Los íntimos de La Victoria (La Victoria's Members); Aliancistas; Blanquiazules; Grones; Victorianos
- Founded: 15 February 1901; 125 years ago (as Sport Alianza)
- Ground: Estadio Alejandro Villanueva
- Capacity: 33,938
- Chairman: Fernando Cabada
- Manager: Pablo Guede
- League: Liga 1
- 2025: Liga 1, 3rd of 19
- Website: clubalianzalima.com.pe
Home colours	Away colours	Third colours

Club Alianza Lima, more commonly known as simply Alianza Lima, is a Peruvian professional sports club based in La Victoria District of Lima, Peru. The club was founded under the name of Sport Alianza on 15 February 1901 by working-class youth in the Chacaritas neighbourhood of Lima. It is widely known for having one of the most historical and successful football teams in Peru; they have won a total of 25 league titles of the Peruvian Primera División and are currently the oldest team playing in that competition, since the club was founded in 1901. According to CONMEBOL, it is considered the most popular club in Peru, and the 6th most popular club in South America, with more than 12 million fans as of April 2016.

Alianza's home stadium is the Estadio Alejandro Villanueva, named after Alejandro Villanueva, one of the most important players in the club's history. The stadium is also popularly known as Matute, the name of the neighbourhood in which it is located. The stadium can hold up to 33,938 spectators.

Alianza Lima is one of the most successful Peruvian football clubs, with a total 59 official titles consisting of 25 Primera División titles, 31 domestic cup titles, 1 supercup, and 1 international cup, the Copa Simón Bolívar. The club has also won numerous regional and short league titles. Alianza enjoyed their most successful period throughout the first decades of their professional era. Their best international performance came in 1976 when they reached the semi-finals of the Copa Libertadores, repeating the feat in 1978. In 1987, tragedy struck Alianza when the entire squad and coaching staff died in an airplane crash as the team returned from an away fixture.

Alianza Lima has had a huge, long-standing rivalry with Universitario de Deportes, the most successful team in Peru with 29 titles, the match is known as the Peruvian Clásico. It is the largest and oldest rivalry in Peru and among the largest in South America; matches very intense and sometimes involve violent fan attacks against each other. Other traditional rivals include Sporting Cristal, Deportivo Municipal, and Sport Boys.

The club has a women's volleyball team that participates in the Liga Nacional Superior de Voleibol. It also has a women's football team that participates in the Liga Femenina along with a basketball, futsal down and Esports team.

== History ==
=== Foundation and early years ===
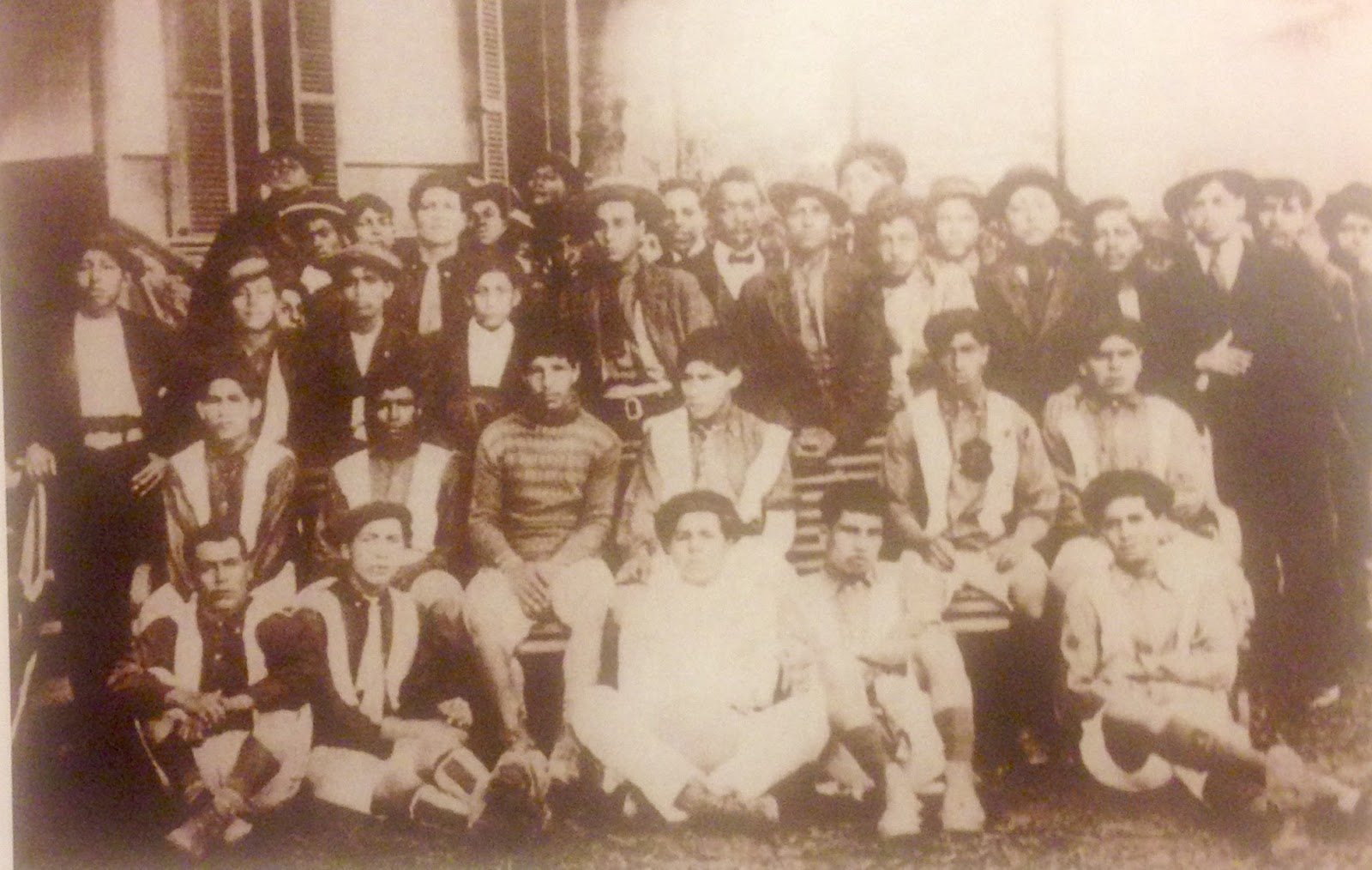
The first Alianza Lima squad, during the years of its creation

The club was founded under the name of Sport Alianza on 15 February 1901 by working-class youth in the Chacaritas neighborhood of Lima. The Alianza name was in reference to the Alianza Racing Horse Stud, where their first matches were played. The stud was located on the same street, Cotabambas, in Lima.

The club is one of the oldest professional football teams in Peru. It was founded on 15 February 1901, as Sport Alianza, named for the stable that hosted its first games. It is the only surviving founding member of the Peruvian Football League, created as an amateur level league in 1912. The club's first kit was green and white, honoring founding member Eduardo Pedreschi's Italian heritage. Beginning in that first season, the colors of the Alianza stables, blue, white and black were used, and by the 1920s the classic vertically striped jersey had become the definitive kit. The club changed its name to Alianza Lima in 1920. The League turned professional in 1951.

Alianza participated in the amateur era of the Peruvian football league from that inaugural season, winning its first title in 1918. During its first years, it played irregularly against other teams from Lima and the port of Callao. Its matches against Atlético Chalaco from Callao stirred interest as a clash between limeños and chalacos. Sport Alianza had started to become a popular team drawing large support and this was the first derby or "clasico".

=== Alleged four-in-a row ===
The Alianza Stud changed owners and locations continuously and, consequently, the team was forced to relocate in turn, until 1928, when under the new name Alianza Lima, the club settled at the third block of the Manco Capac avenue in the La Victoria District, where it would stay and become the emotional home-base for club and fans alike.

That same year Alianza played against the Federación Universitaria (University Federation) for the first time. This club which would later be renamed Universitario de Deportes and become Alianza's greatest rivals, in what is today the most important Peruvian derby.

The 1930s brought great joy and frustration to the team. In 1931, 1932, 1933, and 1934, Alianza Lima won the National Championship four times in a row, for the first and so far only time in Peruvian football. However the Peruvian Football Federation did not recognize the championship of 1934 as won by Alianza. The championship was awarded to the club's biggest rival, Universitario.

The memory of the four-in-a-row was tainted by the club's relegation in 1938, but after one season in the Lima Provincial League, one of the de facto first division leagues, the team returned to the First Division.

=== Titles and cup performances ===
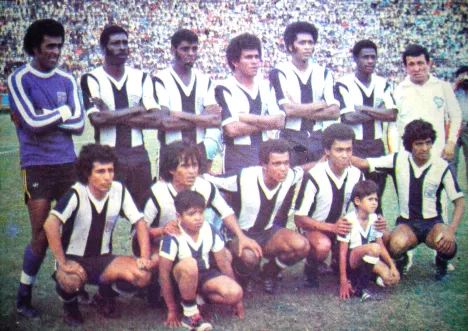
The 1978 squad of Alianza Lima which would go on to reach the semi-finals of the 1978 Copa Libertadores.

During the 1940s, and start of the professional era in the 1950s, 1960s and 1970s, Alianza would win 10 championships. The club won two Peruvian titles in a row in 1977 and 1978, when its players formed the majority of the Peru national football team. The team had its greatest success at the international level in the 1976 and 1978 Copa Libertadores, in which managed to reach the semi-finals but lost to Deportivo Cali 1–4. Since then, its Copa Libertadores campaigns were not successful, during the 1990s the club managed to reach round of 16 several times including a semi-finals participation in the 1999 Conmebol's Copa Merconorte losing to penalty shootout against Colombian side America de Cali the same way it had been defeated by Uruguay's Peñarol a year before in the 1998 Copa Libertadores. Then had one of its worst campaigns in 2007, until the 2010 edition, when they did a great campaign even defeating the defending champion Estudiantes de la Plata by 4–1 in Lima, being one of the three top teams at the end of the first round however, in the Round of 16, they lost the chance to advance further with Universidad de Chile, after a controversial match in Chile, where Ecuadorian referee Carlos Vera gave the Chilean side a goal that had already been flagged by the sideline referee as offside and the play had been called off, however Universidad de Chile's coaching staff including teammates and the pressure of a large local crowd seem to have given referee Carlos Vera the fast initiative to validate the goal, Alianza Lima had been eliminated in what Peruvian media and other South American media believed to be a robbery, Fox Sports network and ESPN agreed the play should not have been validated, Alianza Lima's president Guillermo Alarcon flew to Asuncion, Paraguay to speak to Conmebol and claiming a straight entry to the next Copa Libertadores, the case was also taken to FIFA headquarters but was not approved.

In the 2011 preliminary phase of the Copa Libertadores Alianza Lima came into the tournament as Peru's 3rd place having to face Mexico's Jaguares de Chiapas in a back to back home and away matches for a pass to the Cup's group stage but would lose both games 2–0 and lost a chance to participate. This 2012 version of the Copa Libertadores, Alianza Lima will participate in group 5 as Peru's No. 2 seed against Nacional (Uruguay), Vasco da Gama (Brazil) and the winner of Ecuador's 3rd and Paraguay's 3rd.

=== 1980s decade ===
The 1980s were probably the most bitter years in the club's history. During the first years of the decade, despite having very good players, Alianza could not obtain titles, some which were snatched by Sporting Cristal, which was establishing itself as one of the three big football clubs of Peru.

==== 1987 air tragedy ====
In 1987, Alianza Lima was first in the standings with a few matches left. On 8 December of that year, Alianza made a trip to Pucallpa to play against Deportivo Pucallpa for the league. The match was won 1–0, with Carlos Bustamante scoring. The team took a charter flight for the trip back. The flight departed on 8 December in a Peruvian Navy Fokker F27 airplane, which crashed into the sea when it was a few kilometers away from the Lima-Callao Airport, close to the Ventanilla district in Callao. The only survivor was the pilot, all the players and coaching staff died, being a game away from conquering another title.

Alianza finished the championship playing with members of the youth team and a few players on loan from Chile club Colo-Colo, which had offered to help sending four players (José Letelier, Parko Quiroz, Francisco Huerta and René Pinto). Friendship between both clubs has been strong since then. Alianza could not keep the first place and its greatest rival, Universitario de Deportes, obtained the title.

The team had to restart from scratch and even former players who had already retired, like Teófilo Cubillas, or others who were about to, like César Cueto, played to help the club get out of these bitter times.

Alianza Lima was close to relegation in 1988, but it managed to hold on in the last matches. In the next few years, despite being competitive, it failed to obtain a title.

=== The titles, the centenary and the new titles ===
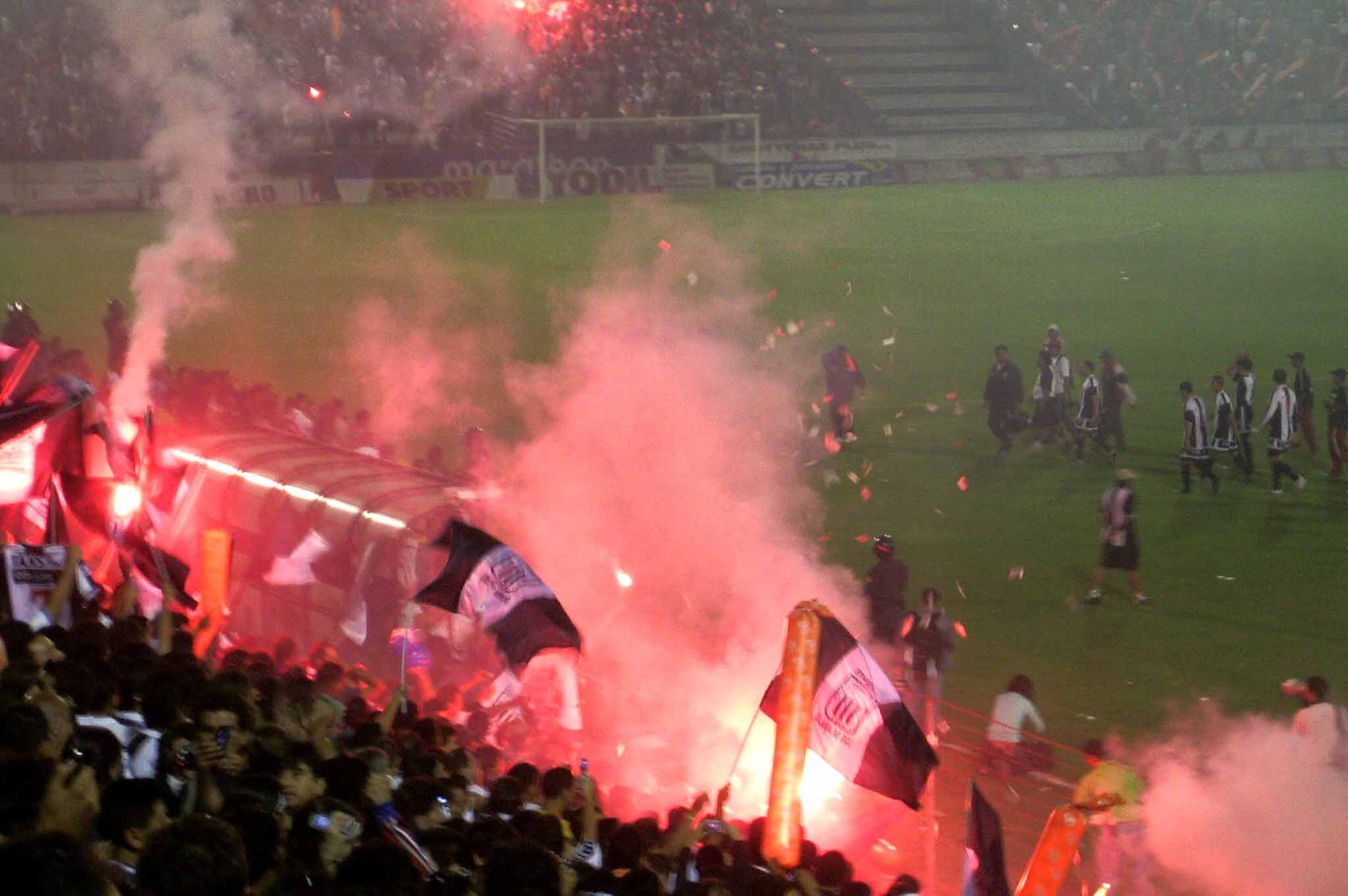
Alianza Lima in the final of the 2006 Torneo Descentralizado

In 1997, Alianza Lima obtained its first title after 18 years, under Colombian manager Jorge Luis Pinto. In 1999 it came in second place, after losing to Universitario in the finals. In the early hours 2000, tragedy struck again when young captain Sandro Baylón died in a car accident after crashing with a post while driving under the influence of alcohol.

In 2001 the club celebrated its centenary and obtained the national title after beating Cienciano in Cusco on penalty kicks. Later on, Alianza Lima would win the 2003 and 2004 championships, defeating Sporting Cristal in both finals, this time under Argentinian manager Gustavo Costas. In 2006 Alianza Lima again won the championship beating Cienciano del Cusco in the final play-off, enabling them to play the Copa Libertadores. In 2017, Alianza Lima won its first championship in over a decade by winning both the Apertura and Clausura and, thus, did not require playing in the final playoffs. Along with Sporting Cristal, Alianza Lima has been the most successful Peruvian club in this century, having won five championships.

At the end of 2020, Alianza was relegated to the second division, despite the fact that in that year all games were played in just Lima and Callao because of the COVID-19 epidemic and teams from the provinces were not able to use their home stadiums. As soon as the season ended, Alianza launched a campaign to try to remain in the first division. There was contention about the team that had finished one place above Alianza, Carlos Stein. The Peruvian FA gave them a fine. Alianza argued that this was not enough, since Alianza's interpretation of the regulation was that they should be docked points. The Peruvian Football Association disagreed explaining that both fines and point reductions were allowed and used with other teams during the competition depending on the level of infraction by the team, and confirmed Alianza's relegation. Then, Alianza took their case all the way to Switzerland, to the International Court of Arbitration for Sport. Eventually CAS decided in favor of Alianza and the team was returned to the first division and Carlos Stein sent to the second division despite the fact that the new season (2021) had already kicked off, and Carlos Stein had played a match.

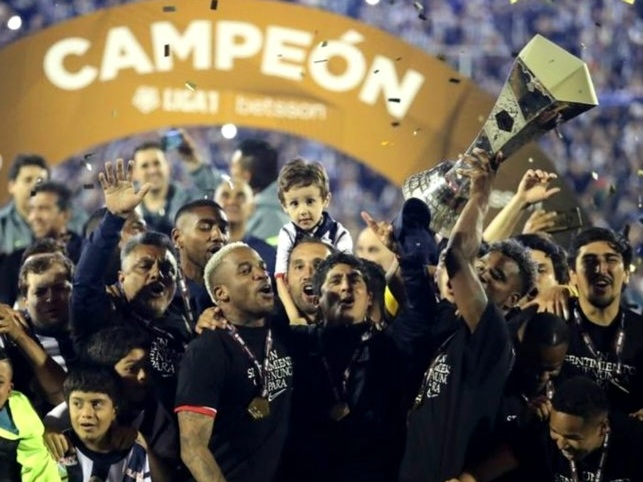
Alianza Lima, champions of the 2022 Liga 1

Eventually, the regular 2021 season ended with a two legged play off against Sporting Cristal. Alianza beat Sporting Cristal in the first game 1–0 and tied the second game 0–0 to become the champions for 2021. Carlos Stein, meanwhile, came through a penalty shoot out at the end of a play off in the second division and won promotion back to the first division again for 2022.

Alianza Lima finished in fourth place for the 2022 Torneo Apertura and first in the Torneo Clausura. Due to coming in second in the aggregate table, they received a bye in the semi-finals of the championship playoffs. Melgar beat Sporting Crystal 2–0 in each leg, coming out 4–0 winners on aggregate to set up a showdown with Alianza Lima for the 2022 Liga 1 title. The first leg was played in Melgar's stadium in Arequipa and Alianza lost 1–0 due to a Yordi Vílchez own goal. Yordi Vílchez made up for it by tying the series on aggregate with a header right before halftime in the second leg. Pablo Lavandeira then popped up to score a header of his own in the 74th minute to give Alianza a 2–1 aggregate lead. They held on to that lead and won back-to-back league titles for the first time since their 2003 and 2004 league title triumphs. This was, according to Peru's official records, Alianza Lima's 25th league title win, while Alianza will refute that this was their 26th. This was also their seventh title since the turn of the century, a record only matched by Crystal. In 2023, defending champions Alianza lost to historic rivals Universitario de Deportes in the final, 3–1 on aggregate.

== Kit and crest ==
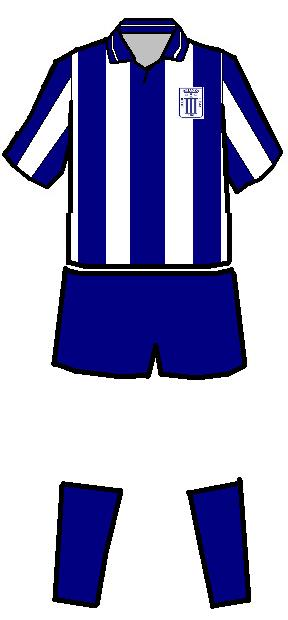
Alianza Lima's traditional uniform. The number of stripes the jersey carries has changed over the years.

The kit used during October in honor of the club's patron saint

The team's home colours consists of a shirt with navy blue and white vertical stripes, navy blue shorts and navy blue socks. Its away colours are not commonly used nor well established, playing sometimes in blue, white or green.

During the month of October, as a tribute to the Lord of Miracles, patron of the team, the regular colours are switched to purple and white. The colour or purple is often associated with the religious image and its procession, being the only team in the world to change the colour of its shirt for a religious tradition.

(1901–11)	(1912–19)	(1912–45)	(1920–25)	(1926–11)	(2012)	(2013)

1912	1920	1925	1927	1970–1987	1988–2010	2011–present

== Stadium ==
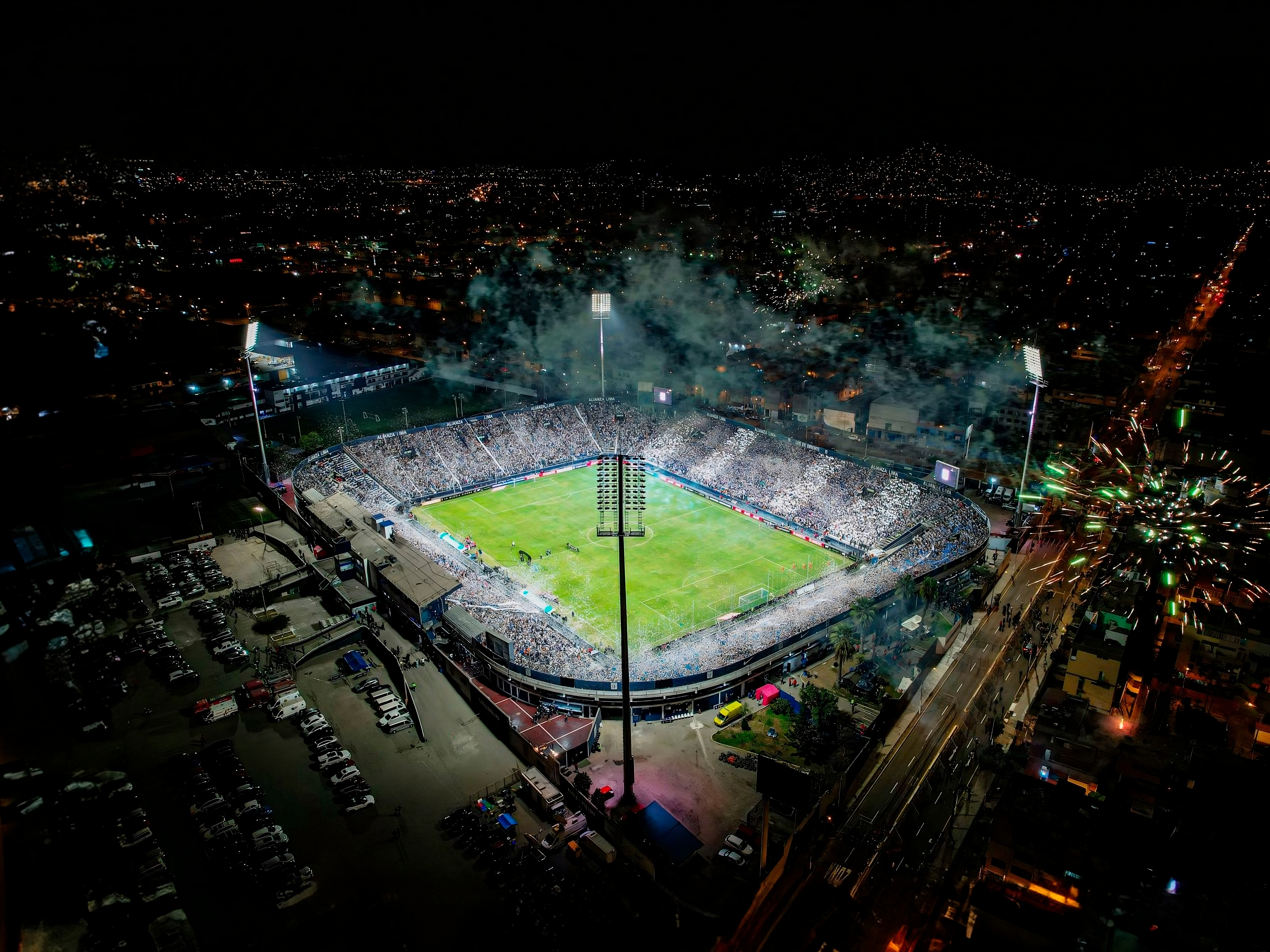
Estadio Alejandro Villanueva also known as Matute, home of Alianza Lima.

Alianza Lima plays its home games at the Estadio Alejandro Villanueva, also known as Matute for the neighbourhood it is located in. Construction was announced on 15 February 1951, the club's 50th anniversary. The land where the stadium was built was donated by Manuel Odría, then-President of Peru. Financial problems however, delayed the beginning of construction. It was only until 30 May 1969 that construction commenced. Uruguayan architect Walter Lavalleja was responsible for the project, with a contribution by Alfonso De Souza-Ferreyra.

The stadium was inaugurated on 27 December 1974, with a match between Alianza and Nacional of Uruguay in front of a crowd of 36,966 spectators. The match ended 2–2.

On 4 December 2010, the stadium became the first in Peru to own an LED screen in high definition. Likewise, it was also at the time the only national sports arena that had a digital banner intended for advertising in 101 square meters.

According to a survey carried out by the University of Lima, the Estadio Alejandro Villanueva is the most unsafe stadium in Peru to play football. This is particularly due to it being located in one of the most dangerous neighbourhoods of Lima. Because of this, since 2016, the stadium has a video-monitoring center and is equipped with 50 high-tech security cameras located in different areas throughout, including both grandstands and the interior and exterior.

== Noche Blanquiazul ==
The Noche Blanquiazul is the name given to the annual presentation of the professional squad.

Starting with a musical performance (usually criolla or salsa music), Noche Blanquiazul marks the introduction of the club's new players, followed by a friendly match against an international guest team. The match has generally been held at the Alejandro Villanueva Stadium. The event was first held in 1995.

== Supporters ==
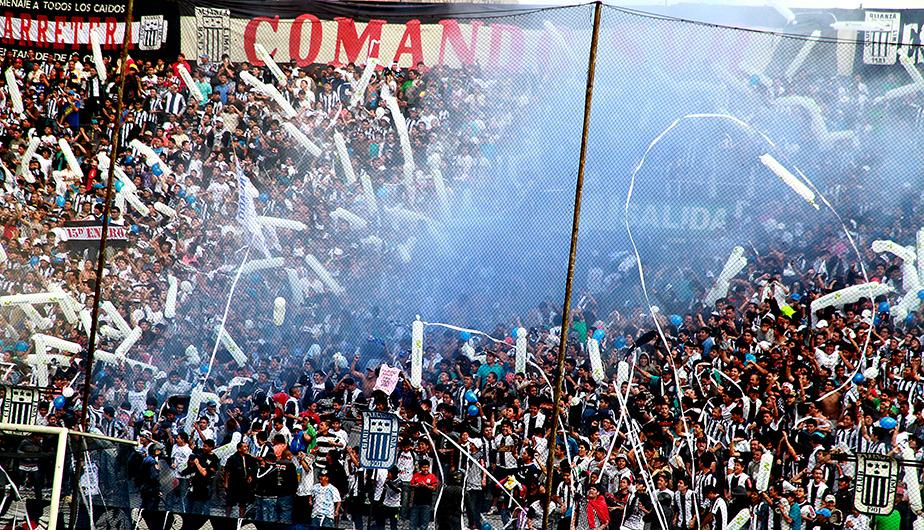
Comando Svr in the Estadio Alejandro Villanueva.

Alianza Lima's supporters are the largest in Peru. Alianza Lima's "Barra Brava", or Ultras group are called the Comando Svr (spelled with a "V" instead of a "U", intending to avoid the initial of bitter rivals Universitario). Alianza Lima are known for their large celebrations and dedication in fans. Historically, the club has been the club of the poor working class, while rivals Universitario were of the upper-class. This was one of the few differences that sparked their intense rivalry.

In years 2001, 2002 and 2003 Apoyo Opinión y Mercado conducted a comparative research about the composition of the Peruvian supporters: According to the survey, 76% of the respondents supported a football team and 24% had no preference. In 2001, results placed Alianza Lima first with 42% of the answers followed by Universitario with 35%. In 2002, the numbers varied but not significantly. Alianza Lima got 43% Universitario 37% and Sporting Cristal 13% of the answers. Alianza for 2003 reached nearly 50% of preferences compared with 31% of Universitario and 17% of Sporting Cristal. For socio-economic levels, Alianza won in A, C, D and E class, while the Universitario was leader in B class. The research found that Alianza's supporters grow when the respondents where of down living standards (in the E class have the 63%).

In 2014, a research done by the "Euromericas Sport Marketing" agency, ranked Alianza Lima as the most popular soccer team in South America and the second most popular in Latin America. Fans's loyalty to Alianza Lima cannot be matched in the continent, that it even surpassed other big soccer teams from Argentina and Brazil like Boca Juniors and Corinthians.

A notable Alianza fan is Pope Leo XIV, who began supporting the team while living in Peru.

In the 2026 Apertura, Alianza Lima drew the second-highest attendance in the league, recording a total of 218,520 in eight home games, resulting in an average attendance of 27,315.

== Rivalries ==
The rivalry between Universitario and Alianza Lima, known as the Peruvian Clásico or El Clásico de los Clásicos del Futbol Peruano, has been the largest football rivalry in Peru and one of the largest in South America. The rivalry first took place in a match between the two sides in 1928. Alianza Lima were expected winners but Universitario came out victorious, beating the league champions. Games between the two teams often erupt into violence and arguments. Alianza Lima has defeated Universitario 140 times and lost 122 times against them. There were 103 draws.

Over the years, this match has been the scene of major altercations, which ended with several players being sent off. This has accentuated the oldest rivalry in Peruvian football, in which Alianza has a significant advantage over its rival, winning 139 times compared to 119 times in 361 classics. It has also scored more goals than its classic rival with a total of 487 goals.

Alianza also has long-standing rivalry with Sporting Cristal. Since the 1956 championship, when they met for the first time, these two teams have played 197 times, of which Alianza won 70 and Sporting Cristal 59. In total there were 68 draws, 487 goals were scored (251 by Alianza Lima). Alianza Lima also has rivalries with Deportivo Municipal and Sport Boys.

== Players ==
=== Current squad ===
As of 2 August 2026

Note: Flags indicate national team as defined under FIFA eligibility rules; some limited exceptions apply. Players may hold more than one non-FIFA nationality.

No.	Pos.	Nation	Player
1	GK	PER	Alejandro Duarte
2	DF	CHI	Nicolás Díaz (on loan from Tijuana)
3	DF	URU	Mateo Antoni (on loan from Argentinos Juniors)
4	DF	PER	Gianfranco Chávez
5	MF	CHI	Esteban Pavez
6	DF	PER	Renzo Garcés
7	MF	ECU	Fernando Gaibor
8	FW	ECU	Eryc Castillo
9	FW	PER	Luis Ramos
11	FW	ARG	Alan Cantero
12	GK	PER	Ángel de la Cruz
13	DF	PER	Marco Huamán
14	DF	PER	D'Alessandro Montenegro
15	MF	PER	Jesús Castillo
17	DF	PER	Luis Advíncula

No.	Pos.	Nation	Player
18	MF	PER	Alessandro Burlamaqui
20	MF	PER	Jairo Vélez
21	MF	PER	Piero Cari
22	MF	PER	Cristian Neira
25	FW	ARG	Gaspar Gentile
27	FW	PER	Kevin Quevedo
29	MF	PER	Jean Pierre Archimbaud
30	FW	PER	Geray Motta
31	DF	PER	Cristian Carbajal
32	DF	PER	Jonathan García
33	GK	PER	Fabrisio Mesías
34	FW	PER	Paolo Guerrero (captain)
35	DF	PER	Jhoao Velásquez
77	DF	PER	Josué Estrada
99	FW	ARG	Federico Girotti

=== Out on loan ===
Note: Flags indicate national team as defined under FIFA eligibility rules; some limited exceptions apply. Players may hold more than one non-FIFA nationality.

No.	Pos.	Nation	Player
19	FW	PER	Matías Succar (at Cienciano until 31 December 2026)
22	DF	PER	Brian Arias (at Universidad Cesar Vallejo until 31 December 2026)
44	DF	PER	Carlos Gómez (at Cajamarca until 31 December 2026)

=== World Cup players ===
The following players were chosen to represent their country at the FIFA World Cup while contracted to Alianza Lima.

- (Peru) Domingo García (1930)
- (Peru) José María Lavalle (1930)
- (Peru) Demetrio Neyra (1930)
- (Peru) Julio Quintana (1930)
- (Peru) Jorge Sarmiento (1930)
- (Peru) Alberto Soria (1930)
- (Peru) Juan Valdivieso (1930)
- (Peru) Alejandro Villanueva (1930)
- (Peru) Julio Baylón (1970)
- (Peru) Teofilo Cubillas (1970, 1978, 1982)
- (Peru) Javier González (1970)
- (Peru) Pedro Pablo León (1970)
- (Peru) Juan Cáceres (1978)
- (Peru) César Cueto (1978, 1982)
- (Peru) Jaime Duarte (1978, 1982)
- (Peru) Guillermo La Rosa (1978, 1982)
- (Peru) Roberto Rojas (1978)
- (Peru) Hugo Sotil (1970, 1978)
- (Peru) José Manuel Velásquez (1978, 1982)
- (Peru) José González Ganoza (1978, 1982)
- (Peru) Jorge Olaechea (1982)
- (Peru) Salvador Salguero (1982)
- (Peru) Miguel Araujo (2018)

=== Records ===
- Félix Suárez Becerra at 6 seconds from the start of the match scored the fastest goal ever in a Copa Libertadores. The game was a 1976 Copa Libertadores match between Alianza Lima and Independiente Santa Fe from Colombia. Alianza went on to win the match by a score of 3–0.
- Juan Valdivieso, a notable goalkeeper in Alianza Lima, once played a match as a forward and scored 7 goals in 1 game.
- Alianza Lima holds the record for the largest win in Peruvian football by defeating Sport Pilsen 11–0 in 1984.
- Alianza Lima is the oldest club in the Peruvian First Division with 103 participations.

==== Top scorers ====
#	Name	Goals	Games	Years
1	(Peru) Waldir Sáenz	178	349	1992–1999, 2001–2005, 2008
2	(Peru) Teófilo Cubillas	165	251	1966–1972, 1977–1978, 1984, 1988
3	(Peru) Víctor Zegarra	128	369	1958–1974, 1977–1978
4	(Peru) Pedro Pablo León	104	227	1960–1970, 1973
5	(Peru) Juan Emilio Salinas	102	127	1948–1956
6	(Peru) Freddy Ravello	101	262	1976–1983
7	(Peru) Wilmer Aguirre	92	379	2001–2006, 2008–2011, 2013–2014, 2021–2022
8	(Peru) Juan Illescas	85	370	1977–1988
9	(Peru) Juan Rivero Arias	77	149	1971–1977
10	(Peru) Alejandro Villanueva	71	99	1927–1943

==== Most appearances ====
#	Name	Games	Goals	Years
1	(Peru) Juan Jayo	524	22	1990–1998, 2002–2008, 2009–2012
2	(Peru) José González Ganoza	509	0	1969–1987
3	(Peru) Jaime Duarte	405	8	1973–1985
4	(Peru) Paulo Hinostroza	386	14	1988–2001
5	(Peru) Wilmer Aguirre	379	92	2001–2006, 2008–2011, 2013–2014, 2021–2022
6	(Peru) Henry Quinteros	371	57	1998–2003, 2008–2013
7	(Peru) Juan Illescas	370	85	1977–1988
8	(Peru) Víctor Zegarra	369	128	1958–1974, 1977–1978
9	(Peru) Waldir Sáenz	349	178	1992–1999, 2001–2005, 2008
10	(Peru) Teófilo Cubillas	327	165	1966–1972, 1977–1978, 1984, 1988

== Managers ==
=== Winning managers ===
Manager	Years	Titles
(Peru) Guillermo Rivero	1928–34	1928, 1931, 1932, 1933
(Peru) Adelfo Magallanes	1946–48; 1954–56	1948, 1954, 1955
(Peru) Luis Guzmán	1952–53	1952
(Brazil) Jaime de Almeida	1961–66	1962, 1963, 1965
(Peru) Marcos Calderón	1975–76, 1987	1975
(Greece) Dan Georgiadis	1972, 1976	1976 Copa Simón Bolívar (FVF)
(Uruguay) Juan Hohberg	1977–78	1977, 1978
(Colombia) Jorge Luis Pinto	1997–98, 1999–00	1997
(Spain) Bernabé Herráez	2001	2001
(Argentina) Gustavo Costas	2003–04; 2009–11	2003, 2004
(Uruguay) Gerardo Pelusso	2006–07	2006
(Uruguay) Guillermo Sanguinetti	2014–15	2014 Torneo del Inca
(Uruguay) Pablo Bengoechea	2017–18; 2019–20	2017, 2018 Supercopa Movistar
(Argentina) Carlos Bustos	2021–22	2021
(Peru) Guillermo Salas	2022–23	2022

=== Other managers ===
- (Peru) Jorge Koochoi (1935–37)
- (Peru) Julio Quintana (1937–40)
- (Peru) Alejandro Villanueva (1940–41)
- (Peru) Juan Valdivieso (1941)
- (Peru) Gerardo Arce (1942–43)
- (Uruguay) Julio Manisse (1944)
- (Spain) Domingo Arrillaga (1945)
- (Peru) Juan Berastaín (1949)
- (Peru) Roberto Aramburú (1949)
- (Italy) Piado Petrovich (1950)
- (Peru) Alejandro González (1951)
- (Peru) Carlos Mora (1953)
- (Uruguay) Roberto Scarone (1957–59)
- (Peru) Alfonso Huapaya (1960)
- (Hungary) Ladislao Padosky (1967)
- (Peru) Rafael Castillo Huapaya (1967, 1974, 1988, 1991)
- (Brazil) Marinho de Oliveria (1968)
- (Uruguay) Hugo Bagnulo (1969–70)
- (Brazil) José Gomes Nogueira (1971–72)
- (Peru) Roberto Reynoso (1972)
- (Argentina) Sabino Bártoli (1973)
- (Peru) Segundo Capristán (1973)
- (Peru) Javier Castillo (1976, 1982, 1987, 1992)
- (Peru) Mario Gonzales (1977)
- (Peru) Juan José Tan (1979, 1984–85)
- (Paraguay) César Cubilla (1980, 1987)
- (Peru) Víctor Zegarra (1981–82, 1983, 2000)
- (Brazil) Didi (1986)
- (Peru) Moisés Barack (1988)
- (Peru) Teófilo Cubillas (1988)
- (Peru) Miguel Company (1989)
- (Brazil) José Carlos Amaral (1990–91)
- (Federal Republic of Yugoslavia) Simo Vilic (1991)
- (Argentina) Pedro Dellacha (1992)
- (Peru) César Cueto (1992)
- (Chile) Miguel Ángel Arrué (1992–94)
- (Federal Republic of Yugoslavia) Ivica Brzić (1994–95, 2001)
- (Chile) Ramón Estay (1995)
- (Peru) Julio César Uribe (1995)
- (Brazil) Gil (1996)
- (Colombia) Édgar Ospina (1998–99)
- (Colombia) Juan F. Arteaga (1999)
- (Brazil) Arthur Bernardes (2000)
- (Brazil) Paulo Autuori (2001)
- (Peru) Jaime Duarte (2001)
- (Peru) Franco Navarro (2002)
- (Argentina) Rubén Darío Insúa (2005)
- (Peru) Wilmar Valencia (2005, 2013)
- (Uruguay) Diego Aguirre (2007)
- (Peru) José Soto (2008)
- (Venezuela) Richard Páez (2008)
- (Peru) José Soto (2012)
- (Peru) Francisco Pizarro (2013)
- (Uruguay) Gustavo Roverano (2015)
- (Peru) Roberto Mosquera (2016)
- (Peru) Juan Jayo (2016)
- (Argentina) Miguel Ángel Russo (2019)
- (Peru) Víctor Reyes (2019)
- (Chile) Mario Salas (2020)
- (Argentina) Daniel Ahmed (2020)
- (Uruguay) Mauricio Larriera (2023)
- (Colombia) Alejandro Restrepo (2024)
- (Argentina) Mariano Soso (2024)
- (Argentina) Néstor Gorosito (2025)
- (Argentina) Pablo Guede (2026–)

== Presidents ==
President	Period
(Peru) José Carreño	1901–02
(Peru) Carlos Villarreal	1903–04
(Peru) Esteban Manuel Aranda	1905–06
(Peru) Manuel Carballo	1907–08
(Peru) Julio Chacaltana Chacón	1909–10
(Peru) Foción Mareátegui	1911
(Peru) Ricardo Pérez	1911–14
(Peru) Carlos Pedreschi Penisqui	1915–18
(Peru) Ernesto Vergara	1918–19
(Peru) Hipólito Venegas	1920–24
(Peru) Manuel Parra del Riego	1925–26
(Peru) Juan Bromley Seminario	1927–31
(Peru) Víctor Oyaque	1931
(Peru) Juan Carbone Gardella	1931–33
(Peru) Adolfo Pedreschi	1934
(Peru) Carlos Arias Schreiber	1935
(Peru) Jorge Checa Eguiguren	1936–40
(Peru) Humberto Fernandini	1941
(Peru) José Vásquez Benavides	1942–44

President	Period
(Peru) Augusto Mulanovich	1945–50
(Peru) José Vásquez Benavides	1951–60
(Peru) Augusto Mulanovich	1961–72
(Peru) Luis Vargas Hornes	1972–75
(Peru) Enrique Zevallos Távara	1976–77
(Peru) Jorge Quiroz	1978–79
(Peru) Enrique Zevallos Távara	1979–82
(Peru) Agustín Merino Tapia	1983–89
(Peru) Alberto Espantoso Pérez	1990–93
(Peru) Pío Dávila Esquenazi	1994–96
(Peru) Alberto Masías Ramírez	1996–01
(Peru) Alfonso de Souza Ferreyra	2002 – Oct 2007
(Peru) Carlos Franco Chipoco	Oct 2007 – May 2009
(Peru) Guillermo Alarcón	May 2009–12
(Peru) Susana Cuba (interim)	2012 – March 2015
(Peru) Christian Bustos	May 2015 – October 2016
(Peru) Renzo Ratto	October 2016 – 2019
(Peru) Diego Gonzales Posada (Junta de Acreedores)	2021–2023
(Peru) Jorge Zúñiga (Junta de Acreedores)	2024–present

== Honours ==
=== Senior titles ===
Keys

- Record
- ^{(s)} Shared record

Type	Competition	Titles	Runner-up	Winning years	Runner-up years
National (League)	Liga 1	25	25	1918, 1919, 1927, 1928, 1931, 1932, 1933, 1948, 1952, 1954, 1955, 1962, 1963, 1965, 1975, 1977, 1978, 1997, 2001, 2003, 2004, 2006, 2017, 2021, 2022	1914, 1917, 1926, 1930, 1934, 1935, 1937, 1943, 1953, 1956, 1961, 1964, 1971, 1982, 1986, 1987, 1993, 1994, 1996, 1999, 2009, 2011, 2018, 2019, 2023
Half-year / Short; Tournament (League)	Torneo Apertura	7	5	1997, 2001, 2004, 2006, 2017, 2023, 2026	1999, 2002, 2003, 2018, 2025
Half-year / Short; Tournament (League)	Torneo Clausura	7	5	1997, 1999, 2003, 2017, 2019, 2021, 2022	1998, 2002, 2014, 2018, 2024
Half-year / Short; Tournament (League)	Liguilla Pre-Libertadores	3	—	1993, 1994, 1996	—
Half-year / Short; Tournament (League)	Torneo Descentralizado	2	—	1986, 1987	—
Half-year / Short; Tournament (League)	Torneo Regional	—	2	—	1986, 1990–II
Half-year / Short; Tournament (League)	Torneo Descentralizado "B"	1	—	1988	—
Half-year / Short; Tournament (League)	Torneo Zona Metropolitana	3	3	1985, 1989–I, 1990–II	1984, 1986, 1990–I
Half-year / Short; Tournament (League)	Torneo Interzonal	1^{(s)}	—	1977 Grupo A	—
Half-year / Short; Tournament (League)	Torneo de Primeros Equipos	3	1	1931, 1932, 1933	1934
Half-year / Short; Tournament (League)	Campeonato de Apertura (ANA)	6	3	1947, 1949, 1950, 1955, 1956, 1963	1954, 1959, 1969
National (Cups)	Supercopa Movistar	1	—	2018	—
National (Cups)	Torneo del Inca	1^{(s)}	1	2014	2015
National (Cups)	Torneo Interligas	1	—	1928	—
National (Cups)	Copa de Campeones del Perú	1	—	1919	—
Regional (League)	Liga Provincial de Lima	1	—	1939	—
International (Cups)	Copa Simón Bolívar (FVF)	1^{(s)}	—	1976	—

=== Friendlies ===
Type	Competition	Titles	Runner-up	Winning years	Runner-up years
National (Cup)	Cuadrangular de Verano	1	—	1990	—
National (Cup)	Torneo Relámpago	2	—	1947–I, 1954	—
National (Cup)	Torneo Extraordinario	—	1	—	1936
International (Cup)	Noche Blanquiazul	13^{(s)}	8	1995, 1996, 2002, 2013, 2014, 2015, 2016, 2019, 2022, 2023, 2024–I, 2025, 2026	2001, 2008, 2009, 2010, 2017, 2018, 2020, 2024–II
International (Cup)	Copa El Gráfico-Perú	2^{(s)}	1	1999, 2003	2002–I
International (Cup)	Copa Ciudad de Rosario	1	—	2011	—
International (Cup)	Copa EuroAmericana	1	—	2014–IV	—
International (Cup)	Noche Naranja	1	—	2012	—
International (Cup)	Marlboro Cup	—	1	—	1990

=== Youth team ===
Type	Competition	Titles	Runner-up	Winning years	Runner-up years
National (League)	Torneo de Promoción y Reservas	2	2	2011, 2022	2013, 2018
National (League)	Torneo Equipos de Reserva	3	3	1934, 1941, 1948	1930, 1932, 1949
National (League)	Torneo Juvenil Sub-18	—	1	—	2025
Half-year / Short tournament (League)	Torneo Clausura (Juvenil Sub-18)	1	—	2025	—
Half-year / Short tournament (League)	Torneo Clausura (Sub-20)	1	—	2002	—
Half-year / Short tournament (League)	Copa Generación Sub-18	—	1	—	2021
Half-year / Short tournament (League)	Torneo Clausura (Reservas)	—	1	—	2018

== Performance in CONMEBOL competitions ==
- Copa Libertadores: 32 appearances

1963, 1964, 1966, 1972, 1976, 1978, 1979, 1983, 1987, 1988, 1994, 1995, 1997, 1998, 2000, 2002, 2003, 2004, 2005, 2007, 2010, 2011, 2012, 2015, 2018, 2019, 2020, 2022, 2023, 2024, 2025, 2026

Semi-finals (2): 1976, 1978

- Copa Sudamericana: 5 appearances

2002: Quarter-finals
2003: Preliminary Round
2014: First Stage
2017: First Stage
2025: Quarter-finals

- Copa CONMEBOL: 1 appearance

1996: First round

- Copa Merconorte: 4 appearances

1998: Group Stage
1999: Semi-finals
2000: Group Stage
2001: Group Stage

- U-20 Copa Libertadores: 3 appearances

2011: Fourth Place
2012: Quarter-finals
2023: Group Stage

== Other sports ==
=== Women's football ===
The Alianza Lima women's football team plays in the Primera División Femenina, or Liga Femenina, the highest tier in Peruvian women's football. They have won the championship three times in 2021, 2022 and 2024. They were runners-up in the 2023 season. Alianza Lima has yet to win an international competition such as the Copa Libertadores Femenina. Their best run in the competition was the quarter-finals in 2022 and 2024.

=== Women's Volleyball ===
Alianza Lima has a women's volleyball team that participates in the Liga Nacional Superior de Voleibol, the highest tier in Peruvian women's volleyball. They won their first title in the 2023–24 season, after being runners-up in the previous three seasons. They have also won the División Superior de Vóley, the previous highest division in volleyball, three times. Alianza Lima were runners-up in the Campeonato Sudamericano de Campeones in 1994.

=== Basketball ===
The Alianza Lima basketball team plays in the Liga Nacional de Basketball. The women's team won the Liga de Basket de Lima in 1980 which is the team's only title.

Type	Competition	Titles	Runner-up	Winning years	Runner-up years
National (League)	Campeonato Metropolitano de Baloncesto	1	—	1980	—
International (Cups)	Campeonato Sudamericano de Clubes Campeones de Básquetbol	1	—	1981 Rueda Consuelo	—

=== Futsal Down ===
The Alianza Lima futsal team participates in the Liga de Futsal de Perú. The team was founded on 16 August 2022 and were national champions in 2023. The team also won the Copa Latinoamericana Inclusiva that same year.

=== E-sports ===
Alianza Lima has an E-sports football team that participates in the Liga Peruana de eFootball. They won the national league in 2021.

== Ranking ==
IFFHS MEN'S CLUB WORLD RANKING 2025 at MAY 10 (Previous year rank in italics, IFFHS Club Coefficients in parentheses)

- 146 (137) (Ecuador) Independiente del Valle (130)
- 150 (128) (Cyprus) AC Omonia Nicosia (128,5)
- 151 (156) (Peru) Alianza Lima (127,75)
- 152 (226) (Paraguay) Guaraní (127,5)
- 153 (131) (Colombia) Santa Fe (126)
