= List of Atlético Madrid honours and achievements =

This is a comprehensive list of Atlético Madrid honours. Atlético have amassed 34 major titles so far in their history. These honours include the La Liga title on eleven occasions, including a league and cup double in 1996; the Copa del Rey on ten occasions; two Supercopas de España, one Copa Eva Duarte and Copa Presidente FEF (both trophies are official predecessor to the Supercopa de España). In European competition, they won the European Cup Winners' Cup in 1962, were runners-up in 1963 and 1986, were Champions League runners-up in 1974, 2014 and 2016, won the Europa League in 2010, 2012 and 2018, and won the UEFA Super Cup in 2010, 2012 and 2018. They also lifted the 1974 Intercontinental Cup.

== Club honours ==
=== International competitions ===
- European Cup / UEFA Champions League

Runners-up (3): 1973–74, 2013–14, 2015–16

- European Cup Winners' Cup

Winners (1): 1961–62
Runners-up (2): 1962–63, 1985–86

- Intercontinental Cup

Winners (1): 1974

- UEFA Europa League

Winners (3): 2009–10, 2011–12, 2017–18

- UEFA Super Cup

Winners (3): 2010, 2012, 2018

=== National competitions ===
- La Liga

Winners (11): 1939–40, 1940–41, 1949–50, 1950–51, 1965–66, 1969–70, 1972–73, 1976–77, 1995–96, 2013–14, 2020–21

Runners-up (10): 1943–44, 1957–58, 1960–61, 1962–63, 1964–65, 1973–74, 1984–85, 1990–91, 2017–18, 2018–19

- Copa del Rey

Winners (10): 1959–60, 1960–61, 1964–65, 1971–72, 1975–76, 1984–85, 1990–91, 1991–92, 1995–96, 2012–13
Runners-up (10): 1920–21, 1925–26, 1955–56, 1963–64, 1974–75, 1986–87, 1998–99, 1999–2000, 2009–10, 2025–26

- Supercopa de España

Winners (2): 1985, 2014
Runners-up (5): 1991, 1992, 1996, 2013, 2020

- Copa Presidente FEF (Official predecessor to the Supercopa de España)

Winners (1): 1947

- Copa Eva Duarte (Official predecessor to the Supercopa de España)

Winners (1): 1951
Runners-up (1): 1950

- Copa de la Liga

Runners-up (2): 1984, 1985

- Copa de los Campeones de España (Unofficial event prior to the Supercopa de España)

Winners (1): 1940

- Segunda División

Winners (1): 2001–02
Runners-up (2): 1932–33, 1933-34

=== Regional Competitions ===
- Campeonato Regional Centro

Winners: (4) 1920–21, 1924–25, 1927–28, 1939–40

- Copa Federación Centro

Winners: (1) 1940–41

- Copa Ramón Triana

Winners: (3) 1944–45, 1953–54, 1959–60

=== Friendly competitions ===
- Copa Rodríguez Azuaga

Winners: 1913

- Trofeo Corpus de Lugo

Winners: 1957

- Trofeo Corpus de Cádiz

Winners: 1958

- Torneo Triangular del Metropolitano

Winners: 1962

- Copa Ciudad de São Paulo

Winners: 1977

- Mohammed V Trophy

Winners: 1965, 1970, 1980

- Trofeo Ciudad de Ceuta

Winners: 1982

- Trofeo La Amistad de Murcia

Winners: 1988

- Trofeo Internacional de Fútbol Ciudad de Oporto

Winners: 1990

- Iberian Cup

Winners: 1991

- Trofeo Ciudad de la Línea

Winners: 1983, 1989, 1992

- Liga de las Televisiones Autonómicas

Winners: 1994

- Trofeo Ciudad de Valladolid

Winners: 1992, 1995

- Orange Trophy

Winners: 1995

- Alicante City Trophy

Winners: 1996

- Trofeo Ciudad de Palma

Winners: 1996

- Trofeo Ciudad de Marbella

Winners: 1994, 1995, 1997

- Trofeo Ciudad de Santa Cruz

Winners: 1997

- Trofeo 75 Aniversario del Club Deportivo Tenerife

Winners: 1997

- Trofeo Gelderland

Winners: 1998

- Trofeo Ciudad de Salamanca

Winners: 1995, 2001

- Trofeo Villa de Leganés

Winners: 2001, 2002

- Villa de Madrid Trophy

Winners: 1974, 1975, 1976, 1980, 1983, 1985, 1986, 1989, 1990, 1992, 1993, 1994, 1995, 1996, 1997, 1998, 2000, 2003

- Copa Telefónica MoviStar

Winners: 2003

- Los Cármenes Trophy

Winners: 2003

- Trofeo Alcarria

Winners: 2003

- Trofeo Madrid 2012

Winners: 2003

- Trofeo Hellboy

Winners: 2004

- Trofeo Ciudad de Zaragoza

Winners: 2004

- Trofeo Ibérico

Winners: 1980, 1981, 2005

- Trofeo Ciudad de Santander

Winners: 2005

- Trofeo Ciudad de Las Palmas de Gran Canaria

Winners: 2005

- Shanghai International Football Tournament

Winners: 2006

- The City of Vigo Trophy

Winners: 2007

- Trofeo Cervantes

Winners: 1978, 1989, 2008

- Trofeo Teresa Rivero

Winners: 2008

- Trofeo Camino Real

Winners: 2008

- Teresa Herrera Trophy

Winners: 1956, 1965, 1973, 1985, 1986, 2009

- Trofeo Colombino

Winners: 1966, 1972, 1991, 1993, 2002, 2011

- Trofeo Villa de Fuenlabrada

Winners: 2011

- Copa Colombia & Copa Neiva

Winners: 2012

- Peter Lim Charity Cup

Winners: 2013

- Trofeo DirecTV de la Copa EuroAmericana

Winners: 2013–VII, 2013–VIII, 2014–V

- Ramón de Carranza Trophy

Winners: 1968, 1976, 1977, 1978, 1991, 1995, 1997, 2003, 2014, 2015

- HKFC Soccer Sevens

Winners: 2015

- Wanda International Football Tournament

Winners: 2015

- Audi Cup

Winners: 2017

- Jesús Gil & Gil Trophy

Winners: 2006, 2013, 2014, 2015, 2016, 2019

- MLS All-Star Game

Winners: 2019

=== Awards & recognitions ===
- Trofeo Martini & Rossi: 1950–51
- Copa Stadium: 1962
- Gold Medal from the Community of Madrid & City Council of Madrid: 2003
- Special mention award with extraordinary character from the Madrid Football Federation: 2012
- Award at XXXIII National Sports Gala: 2012
- Challenge Samaranch Award, at the Grand Mundo Deportivo Gala: 2013
- Orange and Lemon Awards: 2013
- Illustrated Avenue Award for the club's international expansion: 2013
- Laurel Platinum Awards for the best sports project: 2013–2014
- Award at XXXV National Sports Gala of the Spanish Sports Press Association (AEPD): 2014
- IFFHS The World's Club Team of the Month: August 2011, April 2014
- Gold Plate of the Royal Order of Sporting Merit: 2014
- Globe Soccer Special Award: 2014
- Globe Soccer Best Club of the Year: 2012, 2018
- IFFHS The World's Club Team of the Year: 2018

== Individual honours ==
=== Pichichi Trophy ===
- (Francoist Spain) Pruden: 1940–41 (33 goals)
- (Francoist Spain) José Eulogio Gárate: 1968–69 (14 goals), 1969–70 (16 goals), 1970–71 (17 goals)
- (Francoist Spain) Luis Aragonés: 1969–70 (16 goals)
- (Mexico) Hugo Sánchez: 1984–85 (19 goals)
- (Brazil) Baltazar: 1988–89 (35 goals)
- (Spain) Manolo: 1991–92 (27 goals)
- (Italy) Christian Vieri: 1997–98 (24 goals)
- (Uruguay) Diego Forlán: 2008–09 (32 goals) also won the European Golden Shoe

=== Zamora Trophy ===
- (Francoist Spain) Fernando Tabales: 1939–40
- (France) Marcel Domingo: 1948–49
- (Francoist Spain) Miguel Reina: 1976–77
- (Spain) Abel Resino: 1990–91
- (Spain) José Francisco Molina: 1995–96
- (Belgium) Thibaut Courtois: 2012–13, 2013–14
- (Slovenia) Jan Oblak: 2015–16, 2016–17, 2017–18, 2018–19, 2020–21
