= Noche Blanquiazul =

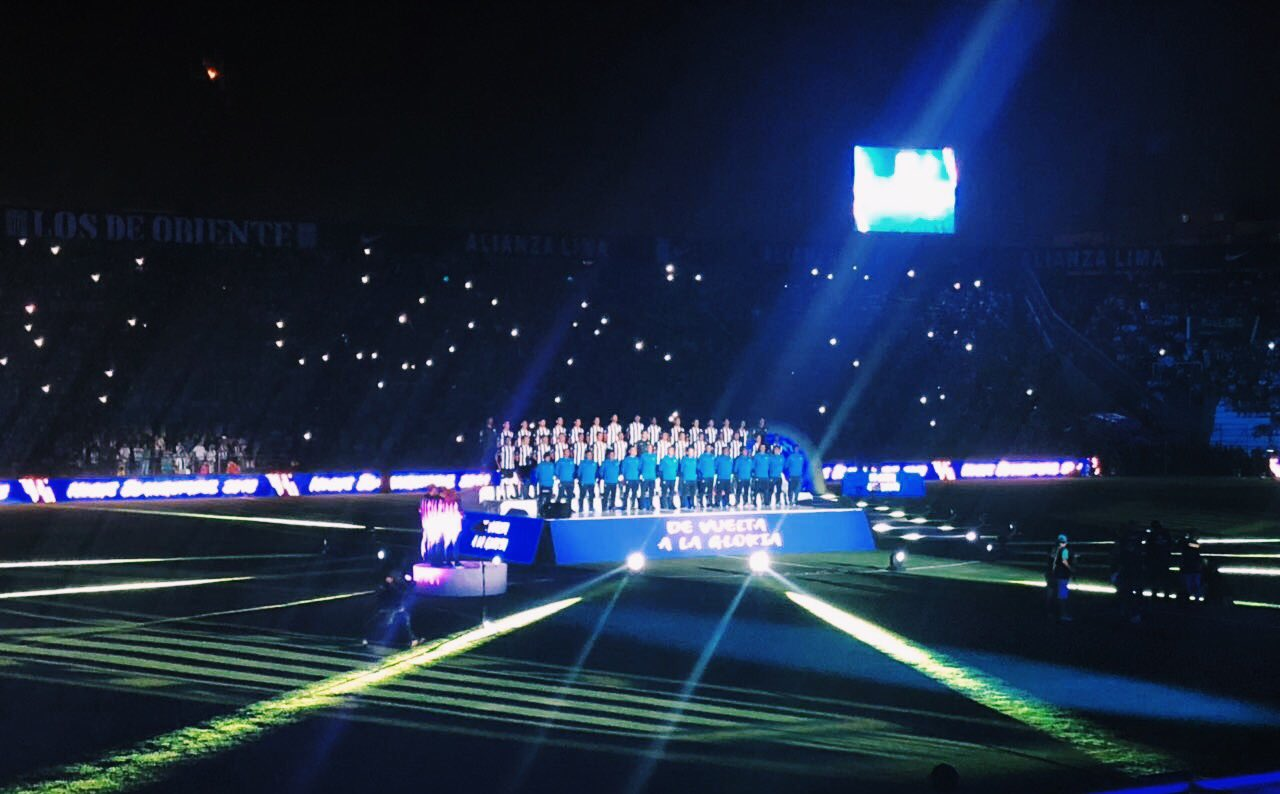
- Founded: 1995
- Region: South America (CONMEBOL)
- Teams: 2
- Current champions: Alianza Lima
- Most championships: Alianza Lima (13 titles)

The Noche Blanquiazul is the name given to the annual presentation of the professional squad of Club Alianza Lima, one of Peru's Big Three.

Starting with a musical performance (usually criolla or salsa music), Noche Blanquiazul marks the introduction of the club's new players, followed by a friendly match against an international guest team. The match has generally been held at the Alejandro Villanueva Stadium. The event was first held in 1995.

== History ==
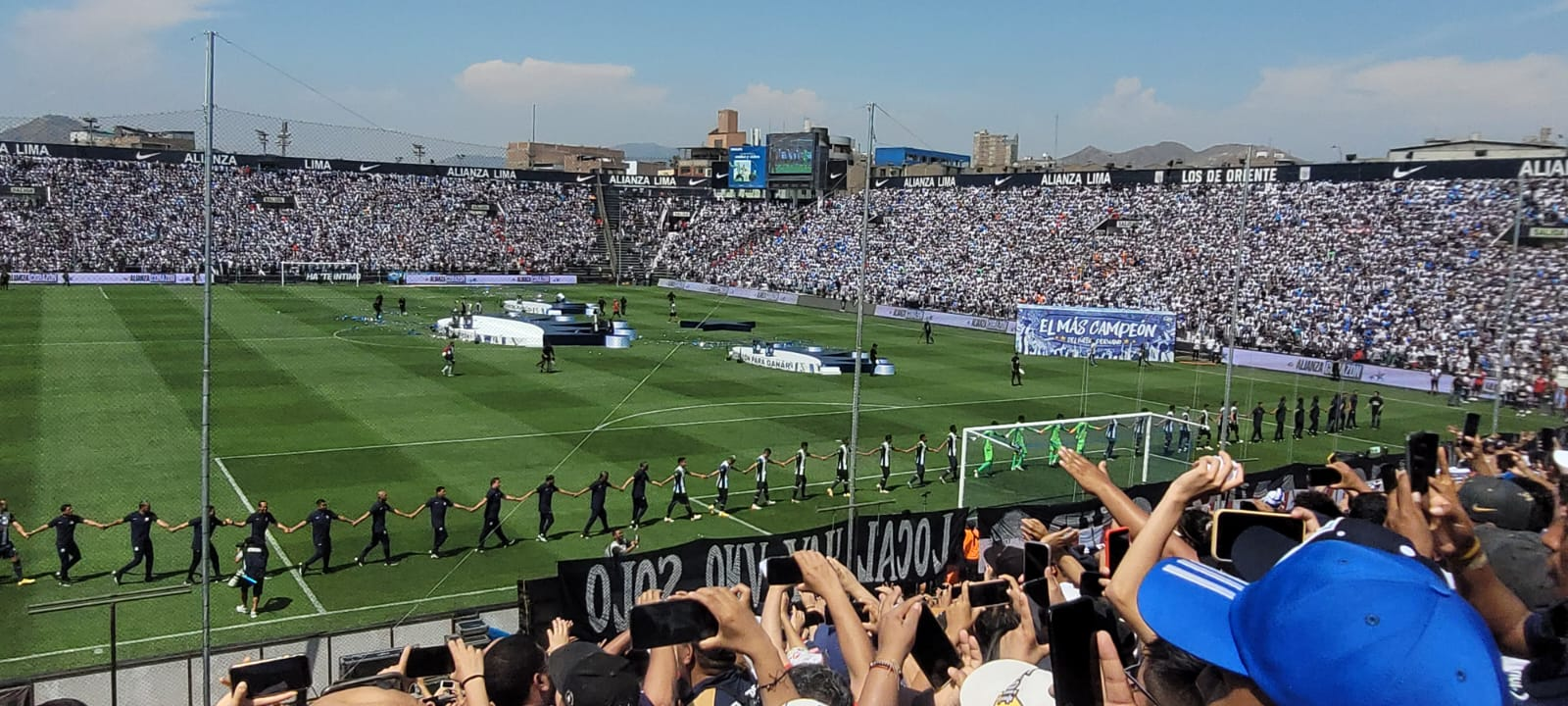
2023 Tarde Blanquiazul

The first edition of a formal team presentation event for the fans was held in the 1990s, with Alianza Lima becoming the first Peruvian club to implement an exhibition of this kind for its first team. The inaugural edition under the name Noche Blanquiazul took place in 1995 during the presidency of Pío Dávila Esquenazi, with Chilean side Green Cross as the opponent at the Alejandro Villanueva stadium. This precedent established a model that was later adopted by other Peruvian sports institutions.

In the following years, the event remained a tradition, attracting international clubs from various leagues, including Liverpool of Uruguay, Emelec of Ecuador, and Universidad Católica of Chile. The 2011 edition was an exception to the usual format: although the squad and the new kit were officially unveiled, no friendly match was played. Nevertheless, starting in 2012, the event has continued without interruption—except for the 2021 edition, which could not be held due to the COVID-19 pandemic—solidifying its place as a long-standing club tradition.

Building on the visibility and popularity of the men's team event, Alianza Lima expanded this presentation format to other sports disciplines. In 2023, the club organized the Noche Blanquiazul Femenina, an exclusive presentation for the women’s football team, becoming one of the first events of its kind to be televised in Peruvian football. That same year, the Noche Blanquiazul Vóley was held to present the women’s volleyball team ahead of the start of the National Superior Volleyball League.

=== Notable Matches ===
The Noche Blanquiazul is known for the international friendly match played as part of the event. Throughout its history, several noteworthy results have been recorded. In 2013, Alianza Lima achieved the largest victory in the event’s history, defeating Universitario de Sucre of Bolivia by a score of 6–1, making it the highest-scoring match in the history of the event alongside the 2010 fixture between Alianza Lima and El Nacional of Ecuador, which ended 3–4 in favor of the Ecuadorian side.

The following year, in 2014, Uruguayan club Rentistas served as the opponent, with Alianza Lima securing the win; this edition also featured a tribute to former player Rafael Castillo. In 2024, the íntimo side held, for the first time in its history, an additional team presentation outside of Lima, specifically in the city of Trujillo, where they faced Universidad Católica of Chile in a match that ended in a goalless draw.

On January 24, 2026, Alianza Lima defeated Inter Miami thanks to a brace from Paolo Guerrero and a goal by Luis Ramos. The result made global headlines across sports media outlets, largely due to Lionel Messi’s presence in the match.

== Development and Cultural Aspects ==
The event serves as an opportunity for supporters to see both the players who remain at the club and the new signings for the upcoming season. Its structure follows a standardized format that includes the unveiling of the official kit the team will wear throughout the year, either preceded or followed by additional activities. These activities typically feature musical performances and the use of lighting and pyrotechnic effects to accompany the individual presentation of the squad and coaching staff to the fans. The event concludes with the friendly match scheduled against the invited international opponent.

== Results ==
=== Men's football team ===
Ed.	Year	Home team	Scores	Away team	Venue
1	1995	(Peru) Alianza Lima (1)	1–0	(Chile) Green Cross	Alejandro Villanueva, Lima
2	1996	(Peru) Alianza Lima (2)	1–0	(Uruguay) Liverpool	Alejandro Villanueva, Lima
3	1997	(Peru) Alianza Lima	3–3	(Ecuador) Emelec	Alejandro Villanueva, Lima
–	1998	No match, there was only a team presentation.			
–	1999	No match, there was only a team presentation.			
–	2000	No match, there was only a team presentation.			
4	2001	(Peru) Alianza Lima	2–3	(Ecuador) LDU Quito (1)	Alejandro Villanueva, Lima
5	2002	(Peru) Alianza Lima (3)	1–0	(Chile) Universidad Católica	Alejandro Villanueva, Lima
–	2003	No match, there was only a team presentation.			
–	2004	No match, there was only a team presentation.			
–	2005	No match, there was only a team presentation.			
–	2006	No match, there was only a team presentation.			
–	2007	No match, there was only a team presentation.			
6	2008	(Peru) Alianza Lima	0–1	(Ecuador) Emelec (1)	Alejandro Villanueva, Lima
7	2009	(Peru) Alianza Lima	0–1	(Ecuador) Once Caldas (1)	Alejandro Villanueva, Lima
8	2010	(Peru) Alianza Lima	3–4	(Ecuador) El Nacional (1)	Alejandro Villanueva, Lima
–	2011	No match, there was only a team presentation.			
9	2012	(Peru) Alianza Lima	1–1	(Uruguay) Cerro	Alejandro Villanueva, Lima
10	2013	(Peru) Alianza Lima (4)	6–1	(Bolivia) Universitario de Sucre	Alejandro Villanueva, Lima
11	2014	(Peru) Alianza Lima (5)	2–1	(Uruguay) Rentistas	Alejandro Villanueva, Lima
12	2015	(Peru) Alianza Lima (6)	1–0	(Uruguay) Fénix	Alejandro Villanueva, Lima
13	2016	(Peru) Alianza Lima (7)	3–2	(Ecuador) Emelec	Alejandro Villanueva, Lima
14	2017	(Peru) Alianza Lima	0–2	(Chile) Palestino (1)	Alejandro Villanueva, Lima
15	2018	(Peru) Alianza Lima	0–2	(Chile) Audax Italiano (1)	Alejandro Villanueva, Lima
16	2019	(Peru) Alianza Lima (8)	3–0	(Ecuador) Barcelona	Alejandro Villanueva, Lima
17	2020	(Peru) Alianza Lima	1–2	(Colombia) Millonarios (1)	Alejandro Villanueva, Lima
–	2021	Canceled due to the COVID-19 pandemic			
18	2022	(Peru) Alianza Lima (9)	1–0	(Colombia) Independiente Medellín	Alejandro Villanueva, Lima
19	2023	(Peru) Alianza Lima (10)	2–1	(Colombia) Junior	Alejandro Villanueva, Lima
20	2024	(Peru) Alianza Lima (11)	2–0	(Colombia) Once Caldas	Alejandro Villanueva, Lima
20	2024	(Peru) Alianza Lima	0–0	(Chile) Universidad Católica	Mansiche, Trujillo
21	2025	(Peru) Alianza Lima (12)	2–0	(Ecuador) Emelec	Alejandro Villanueva, Lima
22	2026	(Peru) Alianza Lima (13)	3–0	(United States) Inter Miami	Alejandro Villanueva, Lima

=== Women's football team ===
Ed.	Year	Home team	Scores	Away team	Venue
1	2023	(Peru) Alianza Lima	0–3	(Chile) Colo-Colo (1)	Alejandro Villanueva, Lima
2	2024	(Peru) Alianza Lima (1)	4–2	(Chile) Universidad Católica	Alejandro Villanueva, Lima
3	2025	(Peru) Alianza Lima (2)	3–0	(Argentina) Independiente	Alejandro Villanueva, Lima
4	2026	(Peru) Alianza Lima (3)	3–1	(Ecuador) LDU Quito	Alejandro Villanueva, Lima

=== Women's voleyball team ===
Ed.	Year	Home team	Scores	Away team	Venue
1	2023	(Peru) Alianza Lima	0–3	(Brazil) Osasco	Coliseo Eduardo Dibós, Lima
2	2024	(Peru) Alianza Lima	1–3	(Argentina) Boca Juniors	Coliseo Eduardo Dibós, Lima
3	2025	(Peru) Alianza Lima	3–1	(Brazil) Fluminense	Coliseo Eduardo Dibós, Lima
3	2025	(Peru) Alianza Lima	3–1	(Argentina) River Plate	Coliseo Eduardo Dibós, Lima
4	2026	(Peru) Alianza Lima	3–0	(Spain) CAV Esquimo	Polideportivo Lucha Fuentes, Lima
4	2026	(Peru) Alianza Lima	3–1	(Argentina) Boca Juniors	Polideportivo Lucha Fuentes, Lima
4	2026	(Peru) Alianza Lima	3–1	(Brazil) Pinheiros	Polideportivo Lucha Fuentes, Lima
