= 1990 Cuadrangular de Verano =

- Founded: 1990
- Region: South America (CONMEBOL)
- Teams: 4
- Current champions: (Peru) Alianza Lima
- Most championships: (Peru) Alianza Lima (1 title)

The Cuadrangular de Verano, was an exhibition football competition hosted in Lima, Peru in 1990. The four biggest teams in Lima participated: Alianza Lima, Sporting Cristal, Sport Boys and Universitario. All matches were played at the Estadio Alejandro Villanueva in Lima. Alianza Lima were the champions.

== League table ==
=== Standings ===
Pos	Team	Pld	W	D	L	GF	GA	GD	Pts	Qualification or relegation
1	Alianza Lima	3	2	1	0	4	0	+4	5	Champion
2	Sporting Cristal	3	2	0	1	6	3	+3	4	
3	Universitario	3	0	2	1	2	4	−2	2	
4	Sport Boys	3	0	1	2	2	7	−5	1	

Rules for classification: 1) Points; 2) Goal difference; 3) Goals for; 4) Fair play points; 5) Drawing of lots.

== Results ==
=== First round ===
18 March 1990	Universitario	1–1	Sport Boys	Estadio Alejandro Villanueva, Lima
17:00	Jesús Torrealba 75'		Oswaldo Flores 85'	Referee: Carlos Mansilla

18 March 1990	Alianza Lima	1–0	Sporting Cristal	Estadio Alejandro Villanueva, Lima
19:00	Rosinaldo López 9'			Referee: Carlos Montalvan

=== Second round ===
21 March 1990	Sporting Cristal	3–1	Sport Boys	Estadio Alejandro Villanueva, Lima
17:00	Pedro J. Galván 16' 68'; Percy Olivares 85'		Carlos Henrique Paris 45'	Referee: José Ramírez

21 March 1990	Alianza Lima	0–0	Universitario	Estadio Alejandro Villanueva, Lima
19:00				Referee: Fernando Chappell

=== Third round ===
29 March 1990	Sporting Cristal	3–1	Sport Boys	Estadio Alejandro Villanueva, Lima
17:00	Francesco Manassero 23'; Martin Dall’Orso 35' 67'		Andrés Gonzales 84'	Referee: Jaime Rodríguez

29 March 1990	Alianza Lima	3–0	Sport Boys	Estadio Alejandro Villanueva, Lima
19:00	Rosinaldo López 16'; Víctor Reyes 44'; Paulo Hinostroza 84'			Referee: Carlos Rivero Jr.
