= Luis Guzmán (Peruvian footballer) =

Peruvian footballer and manager

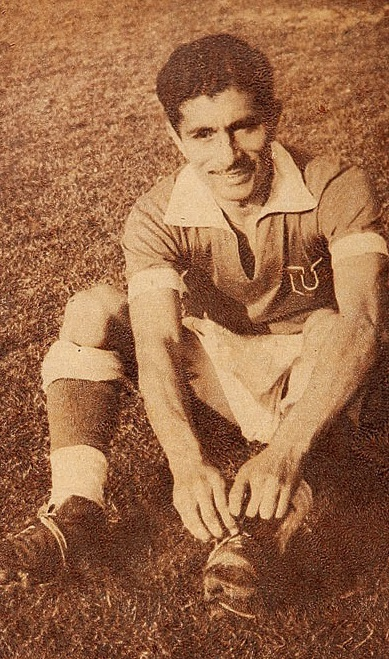
- Luis Guzmán with Universidad de Chile in 1949

Personal information
- Full name: Luis Guzmán Gonzales
- Date of birth: 2 September 1918
- Place of birth: Lima, Peru
- Date of death: 19 January 1989 (aged 70)
- Place of death: Lima, Peru
- Position: Midfielder

Senior career*
Years	Team	Apps	(Gls)
1934	Alianza Lima		
1935–1936	Atlético Córdoba		
1937–1948	Deportivo Municipal		
1949–1950	Universidad de Chile	19	(6)
1950	Independiente Medellín		
1951–1952	Alianza Lima		
1953	Atlético Español		

International career
1941–1947	Peru	13	(4)

Managerial career
- 1952: Alianza Lima
- 1964–1965: Porvenir Miraflores
- 1966: Deportivo Municipal
- * Club domestic league appearances and goals

Luis Guzmán Gonzales (2 September 1918 – 19 January 1989) was a Peruvian footballer who played as a midfielder for Deportivo Municipal over a decade from 1937 to 1948. He also played 13 matches for the Peruvian national team in the 1940s.

As a manager, he coached Alianza Lima in 1952, and then Porvenir Miraflores and Deportivo Municipal in the mid-1960s.

== Playing career ==
=== Club career ===
Luis Guzmán was born in Lima, Peru, on 2 September 1918, and he began his football career in his hometown club Alianza Lima in 1934, aged 16. Nicknamed "Caricho" Guzmán, he had been called upon to succeed Alejandro Villanueva, idol of Alianza Lima, but was unable to make a place for himself in this club. He was fragile in appearance, but a great player on the field.

Thanks to the intervention of Juan Bromley, manager of Deportivo Municipal, he was transferred to the latter club in 1937, remaining there for the next 11 seasons. The midfield trio that he formed with Máximo Mosquera and Roberto Drago became known as Los Tres Gatitos ("the three kittens"), which left their mark on Peru in the 1940s, as it played a crucial role in helping the club win three Peruvian championship titles in 1938, 1940, and 1943.

Guzmán also knew how to play in clubs abroad, such as Universidad de Chile in Chile (1949–1950), Independiente Medellín in Colombia (1950), and Atlético Español in Mexico (1953). When he returned to Peru in 1951, Guzmán signed with Alianza Lima in a high-publicized and turbulent transfer, especially because his career and image were related to the colors of rivals Deportivo Municipal.

=== International career ===
In total, Guzmán earned 13 caps for the Peruvian national team between 1941 and 1947, scoring four goals. He was a member of the Peruvian squad that participated in the 1942 and 1947 South American Championships.

== Manegerial career ==
In 1952, the 34-year-old Guzmán performed the functions of a player-coach at Alianza Lima, and he is therefore listed as a Championship Winning Coach.

== Death ==
Guzmán died in Lima on 17 January 1989, at the age of 70.

== Honours ==
=== Player ===
Deportivo Municipal

- Peruvian Primera División (3): 1938, 1940, 1943
- Runner-up (5): 1941, 1942, 1944, 1945, and 1947

Alianza Lima

- Peruvian Primera División (1): 1952
- Runner-up (1): 1934

=== Manager ===
Alianza Lima

- Peruvian Primera División (1): 1952
