= 2017 Alianza Lima season =

Alianza Lima
2017 season
- Chairman: (Peru) Renzo Ratto
- Manager: (Uruguay) Pablo Bengoechea
- Stadium: Alejandro Villanueva
- Peruvian Primera División: Winners
- Copa Sudamericana: First Stage
- Top goalscorer: League: Luis Aguiar (13); All: Luis Aguiar (15)
Home colours	Away colours	Third colours

The 2017 season was the 112th season of Club Alianza Lima.

== Squad ==
Note: Flags indicate national team as defined under FIFA eligibility rules; some limited exceptions apply. Players may hold more than one non-FIFA nationality.

No.	Pos.	Nation	Player
1	GK	PER	Leao Butron
3	DF	PER	Renato Rojas
5	DF	PER	Francisco Duclos
6	MF	PER	Carlos Ascues
7	MF	URU	Luis Aguiar
8	MF	PER	Alejandro Hohberg
9	FW	URU	Gabriel Leyes
10	FW	ARG	Germán Pacheco
11	FW	COL	Lionard Pajoy
12	GK	PER	Daniel Prieto

No.	Pos.	Nation	Player
14	MF	PER	Luis Ramírez
15	DF	PER	Alexis Cossio
17	DF	URU	Gonzalo Godoy
18	MF	PER	Rinaldo Cruzado
20	MF	PER	Aldair Fuentes
21	MF	PER	Óscar Vílchez
23	DF	PER	Luis Garro
24	DF	PER	Miguel Araujo
25	DF	PER	Paolo de la Haza
27	FW	PER	Kevin Quevedo

== Friendlies ==
2017-01-27	Alianza Lima (Peru)	0–2	(Chile) Palestino	Alejandro Villanueva
		Report		Attendance: 30000; Referee: Luis Garay (Perú)

2017-03-22	Unión Huaral (Peru)	2–0	(Peru) Alianza Lima	Julio Lores Colán
		Report		Attendance: 2000

2017-03-25	Alianza Lima (Peru)	2–2	(Peru) Academia Cantolao	Alejandro Villanueva
		Report

2017-05-21	Coronel Bolognesi (Peru)	0–5	(Peru) Alianza Lima	Jorge Basadre
		Report		Attendance: 5000

2017-08-30	Alianza Lima (Peru)	0–3	(Ecuador) Delfín	Alejandro Villanueva
		Report		Referee: Micke Palomino (Perú)

2017-05-21	Cienciano (Peru)	1–3	(Peru) Alianza Lima	25 de noviembre
		Report		Attendance: 3000

== Competitions ==
=== Overall ===
Competition	Started round	Final position / round	First match	Last match
Peruvian Primera División	Torneo de Verano	Champions	Feb 12	Dec 3
Copa Sudamericana	First Stage	First Stage	Apr 4	May 9

=== Peruvian Primera División ===
The 2017 Torneo Descentralizado de Fútbol Profesional was the 101st season of the highest division of Peruvian football.

==== Torneo de Verano ====
===== Group B =====
Pos	Team	Pld	W	D	L	GF	GA	GD	Pts
1	UTC	14	8	3	3	24	15	+9	27
2	Real Garcilaso	14	7	3	4	27	17	+10	24
3	Alianza Lima	14	6	5	3	22	15	+7	23

===== Results by round =====
Round	1	2	3	4	5	6	7	8	9	10	11	12	13	14
Ground	A	H	H	A	H	A	H	H	A	A	H	A	H	A
Result	W	W	D	W	D	L	D	W	L	L	D	W	W	D
Position	2	3	3	3	3	4	4	4	2	3	4	2	2	2

A = Away; H = Home; W = Win; D = Draw; L = Loss

==== Torneo Apertura ====
Pos	Team	Pld	W	D	L	GF	GA	GD	Pts	Qualification
1	Alianza Lima	15	9	3	3	25	11	+14	30	Advance to Playoffs and qualification to Copa Libertadores group stage
2	Real Garcilaso	15	9	3	3	23	18	+5	30	
3	UTC	15	8	3	4	17	9	+8	27	

===== Results =====
Home \ Away	AAS	ALI	AYA	CAN	COM	JA	MEL	MUN	RGA	SHU	SRO	CRI	UCO	USM	UTC	UNI
Alianza Atlético	—	1–0	—	—	—	—	—	—	—	—	—	—	—	—	—	—
Alianza Lima	—	—	4–0	1–1	—	2–0	—	—	2–0	3–3	4–1	—	—	3–2	—	—
Ayacucho	—	—	—	—	—	—	—	—	—	—	—	—	—	—	—	—
Cantolao	—	—	—	—	—	—	—	—	—	—	—	—	—	—	—	—
Comerciantes Unidos	—	0–0	—	—	—	—	—	—	—	—	—	—	—	—	—	—
Juan Aurich	—	—	—	—	—	—	—	—	—	—	—	—	—	—	—	—
Melgar	—	1–0	—	—	—	—	—	—	—	—	—	—	—	—	—	—
Deportivo Municipal	—	0–2	—	—	—	—	—	—	—	—	—	—	—	—	—	—
Real Garcilaso	—	—	—	—	—	—	—	—	—	—	—	—	—	—	—	—
Sport Huancayo	—	—	—	—	—	—	—	—	—	—	—	—	—	—	—	—
Sport Rosario	—	—	—	—	—	—	—	—	—	—	—	—	—	—	—	—
Sporting Cristal	—	0–1	—	—	—	—	—	—	—	—	—	—	—	—	—	—
Unión Comercio	—	0–1	—	—	—	—	—	—	—	—	—	—	—	—	—	—
Universidad San Martín	—	—	—	—	—	—	—	—	—	—	—	—	—	—	—	—
UTC	—	1–0	—	—	—	—	—	—	—	—	—	—	—	—	—	—
Universitario	—	1–2	—	—	—	—	—	—	—	—	—	—	—	—	—	—

Source: ADFP - official fixture
Legend: Blue = home team win; Yellow = draw; Red = away team win.

===== Results by round =====
Round	1	2	3	4	5	6	7	8	9	10	11	12	13	14	15
Ground	H	A	A	H	A	H	A	H	A	H	A	H	A	H	A
Result	W	W	L	W	W	W	L	D	W	D	L	W	W	W	D
Position	3	2	3	1	1	2	5	3	1	2	2	1	1	1	1

A = Away; H = Home; W = Win; D = Draw; L = Loss

==== Torneo Clausura ====
Pos	Team	Pld	W	D	L	GF	GA	GD	Pts	Qualification
1	Alianza Lima	15	11	1	3	23	15	+8	34	Advance to Playoffs and qualification to Copa Libertadores group stage
2	Real Garcilaso	15	10	2	3	29	15	+14	32	
3	Melgar	15	9	4	2	30	12	+18	31	

===== Results =====
Home \ Away	AAS	ALI	AYA	CAN	COM	JA	MEL	MUN	RGA	SHU	SRO	CRI	UCO	USM	UTC	UNI
Alianza Atlético	—	—	—	—	—	—	—	—	—	—	—	—	—	—	—	—
Alianza Lima	3–0	—	—	—	2–0	—	2–1	1–0	—	—	—	2–1	1–0	—	2–0	1–0
Ayacucho	—	1–2	—	—	—	—	—	—	—	—	—	—	—	—	—	—
Cantolao	—	1–1	—	—	—	—	—	—	—	—	—	—	—	—	—	—
Comerciantes Unidos	—	—	—	—	—	—	—	—	—	—	—	—	—	—	—	—
Juan Aurich	—	2–0	—	—	—	—	—	—	—	—	—	—	—	—	—	—
Melgar	—	—	—	—	—	—	—	—	—	—	—	—	—	—	—	—
Deportivo Municipal	—	—	—	—	—	—	—	—	—	—	—	—	—	—	—	—
Real Garcilaso	—	4–1	—	—	—	—	—	—	—	—	—	—	—	—	—	—
Sport Huancayo	—	4–2	—	—	—	—	—	—	—	—	—	—	—	—	—	—
Sport Rosario	—	0–1	—	—	—	—	—	—	—	—	—	—	—	—	—	—
Sporting Cristal	—	—	—	—	—	—	—	—	—	—	—	—	—	—	—	—
Unión Comercio	—	—	—	—	—	—	—	—	—	—	—	—	—	—	—	—
Universidad San Martín	—	1–2	—	—	—	—	—	—	—	—	—	—	—	—	—	—
UTC	—	—	—	—	—	—	—	—	—	—	—	—	—	—	—	—
Universitario	—	—	—	—	—	—	—	—	—	—	—	—	—	—	—	—

Source: ADFP - official fixture
Legend: Blue = home team win; Yellow = draw; Red = away team win.

===== Results by round =====
Round	1	2	3	4	5	6	7	8	9	10	11	12	13	14	15
Ground	A	H	H	A	H	A	H	A	H	A	H	A	H	A	H
Result	L	W	W	W	W	W	W	D	W	L	W	L	W	W	W
Position	14	10	6	4	3	1	3	2	2	4	3	4	1	1	1

A = Away; H = Home; W = Win; D = Draw; L = Loss

==== Playoffs ====
As Alianza Lima and Real Garcilaso finished both as champions and runners-up of the Apertura and Clausura tournaments, no playoff games were played. Alianza Lima were the overall champions and Real Garcilaso were the overall runners-up.

=== Copa Sudamericana ===
==== First stage ====
4 April 2017 First Stage	Independiente (Argentina)	0–0	(Peru) Alianza Lima	Estadio Libertadores de América, Avellaneda
21:45 UTC−3		Report		Attendance: 23,000; Referee: Patricio Polic (Chile)

31 May 2017 First Stage	Alianza Lima (Peru)	0–1	(Argentina) Independiente	Estadio Alejandro Villanueva, Lima
19:45 UTC−5		Report	Rigoni 30'	Attendance: 27,500; Referee: Anderson Daronco (Brazil)

Independiente won 1–0 on aggregate and advanced to the second stage.
