= Bernabé Herráez =

Spanish association football manager

Personal information
- Date of birth: 21 February 1964 (age 62)
- Place of birth: Valencia, Spain

Managerial career
- Years: Team
- 1987–1988: Beniparrell
- 1988–1989: Torre Levante
- 1989–1990: Silla
- 1990–1991: Canals
- 1991–1992: Albacete B
- 1992–1993: Picassent
- 1993–1997: Atlético Barrio de la Luz
- 2001: Alianza Lima
- 2002: Caravaca
- 2002: UCAM Murcia
- 2003–2004: Corralejo
- 2004: Ibiza

Bernabé Herráez Gil (born 21 February 1964) is a Spanish former football manager.

== Career ==
Herráez started his managerial career with Spanish sixth tier side Beniparrell CF. In 1988, he was appointed manager of Torre Levante in the Spanish fifth tier. In 1990, Herráez was appointed manager of Spanish fourth tier club UD Canals. In 1993, he was appointed manager of CF Atlético Barrio de la Luz in the Spanish fifth tier. In 2001, he was appointed manager of Peruvian top flight team Alianza Lima, helping them win the league.

In 2002, Herráez was appointed manager of Caravaca in the Spanish fourth tier. In 2003, he was appointed manager of Spanish third tier outfit Corralejo. In 2004, he was appointed manager of Ibiza in the Spanish fourth tier.
