= 2015 Copa EuroAmericana =

International association football competition

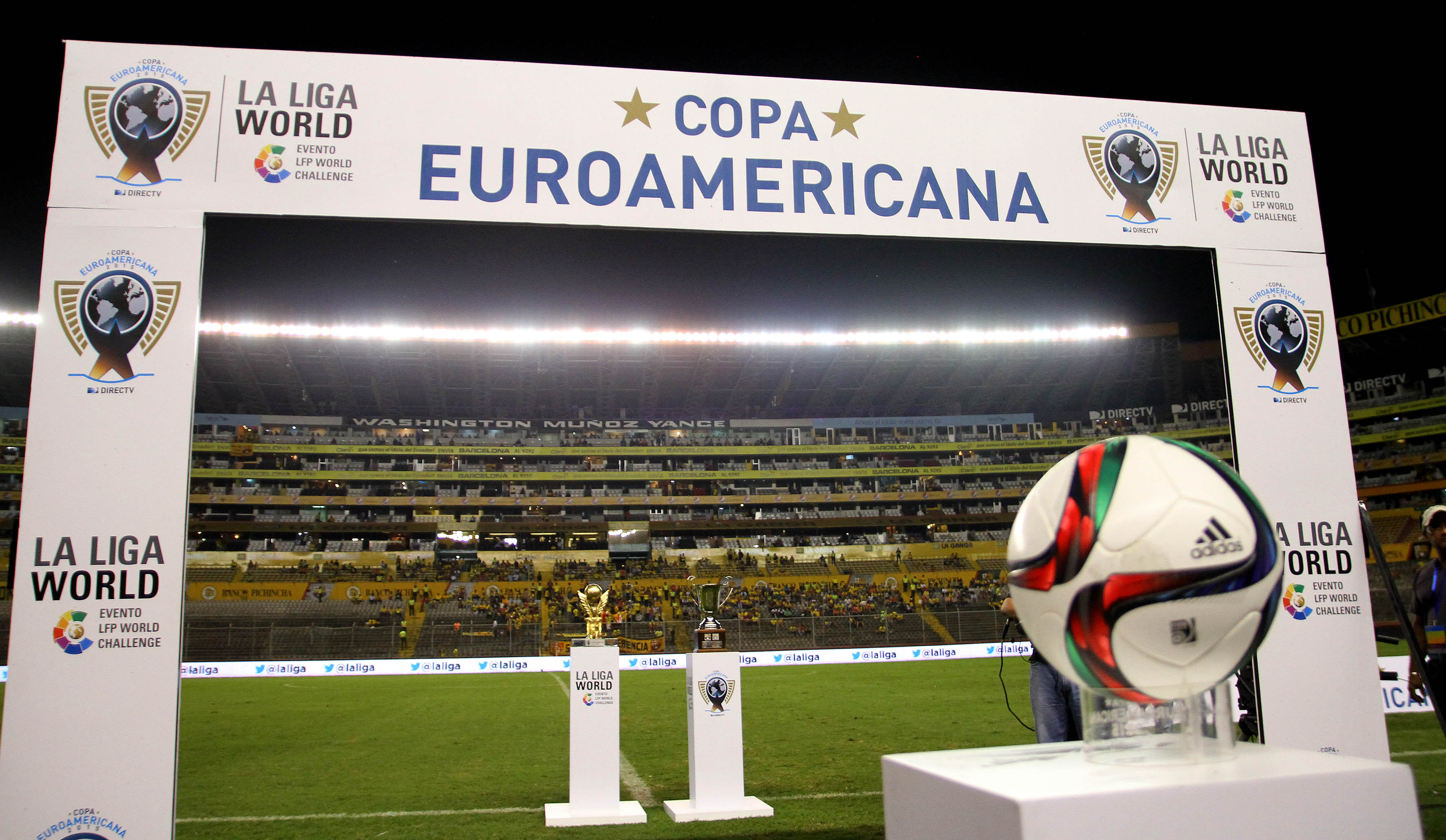

Tournament details
- Dates: 28 May – 1 August
- Teams: 6 (from 2 confederations)
- Venues: 4 (in 4 host cities)

Final positions
- Champions: South America (1st title)
- Runners-up: Europe

Tournament statistics
- Matches played: 4
- Goals scored: 10 (2.5 per match)
- Top scorer: (Croatia) Duje Čop (2 goals)

The 2015 Copa EuroAmericana was the third and final edition of the Copa EuroAmericana, a men's football friendly tournament created by DirecTV. This edition took place in venues across South America from 28 May to 1 August 2015. Six teams (Barcelona, Deportivo Cali, Peñarol and San Lorenzo from CONMEBOL, and Espanyol and Málaga from UEFA), participated in the tournament. South America (represented by the CONMEBOL teams) won the cup with three victories.

== Format ==
Each match was played for 90 minutes. In case of a draw after regulation, the winner was determined via a penalty shoot-out. The confederation of the winning team of each match was awarded with a point, and the confederation with the most points at the end of the tournament was crowned champions.

== Participating teams ==
| Confederation | Team | Most recent domestic honour | Latest continental performance |
|---|---|---|---|
| CONMEBOL | (Ecuador) Barcelona | 2012 Serie A | 2015 Copa Libertadores – Second stage |
| CONMEBOL | (Colombia) Deportivo Cali | 2015 Torneo Apertura | 2014 Copa Sudamericana – Second stage |
| CONMEBOL | (Uruguay) Peñarol | 2012–13 Primera División | 2014 Copa Sudamericana – Round of 16 |
| CONMEBOL | (Argentina) San Lorenzo | 2013 Torneo Inicial | 2015 Copa Libertadores – Second stage |
| UEFA | (Spain) Espanyol | 2005–06 Copa del Rey | 2006–07 UEFA Cup – Runners-up |
| UEFA | (Spain) Málaga | 1998–99 Segunda División | 2012–13 UEFA Champions League – Quarter-finals |

== Venues ==
| Buenos Aires | Cali | Guayaquil | Montevideo |
|---|---|---|---|
| Estadio Pedro Bidegain | Estadio Deportivo Cali | Estadio Monumental | Estadio Centenario |
| Argentina | Colombia | Ecuador | Uruguay |
| Capacity: 43.995 | Capacity: 55.000 | Capacity: 70.000 | Capacity: 60.235 |

== Standings ==
| South America; Points: 3 | Europe; Points: 1 |

== Matches ==
28 May 2015
19:30 UTC−05:00

| Barcelona (Ecuador) | 1–0 | (Spain) Espanyol |
|---|---|---|
| Vera 60' | Report |

Estadio Monumental, Guayaquil, Ecuador
Referee: Ómar Ponce (Ecuador)

26 July 2015
17:00 UTC−05:00

| Deportivo Cali (Colombia) | 3–2 | (Spain) Málaga |
|---|---|---|
| Casierra 48'; Benedetti 58'; Murillo 85' | Report | Charles 16'; Čop 60' |

Estadio Deportivo Cali, Cali, Colombia
Attendance: 15,000
Referee: Juan Pontón Rodríguez (Colombia)

30 July 2015
20:30 UTC−03:00

| San Lorenzo (Argentina) | 0–0 | (Spain) Málaga |
|---|---|---|
| | Report |
Penalties
| Elizari (penalty scored); Fontanini (penalty scored); Barbaro (penalty scored); Kalinski (penalty scored); Prósperi (penalty missed) | 4–3 | (penalty scored) Juanpi; (penalty scored) Recio; (penalty scored) Duda; (penalty missed) Tissone; (penalty missed) Charles |

Estadio Pedro Bidegain, Buenos Aires, Argentina

1 August 2015
15:00 UTC−03:00

| Peñarol (Uruguay) | 1–3 | (Spain) Málaga |
|---|---|---|
| Ifrán 23' | Report | Čop 72'; Duda 82'; Rosales 88' |

Estadio Centenario, Montevideo, Uruguay
Referee: Jonathan Fuentes (Uruguay)

== Top goalscorers ==
| Rank | Name | Team | Goals |
|---|---|---|---|
| 1 | (Croatia) Duje Čop | (Spain) Málaga | 2 |
| 2 | (Colombia) Nicolás Benedetti | (Colombia) Deportivo Cali | 1 |
| 2 | (Colombia) Mateo Casierra | (Colombia) Deportivo Cali | 1 |
| 2 | (Brazil) Charles | (Spain) Málaga | 1 |
| 2 | (Portugal) Duda | (Spain) Málaga | 1 |
| 2 | (Uruguay) Diego Ifrán | (Uruguay) Peñarol | 1 |
| 2 | (Colombia) Miguel Ángel Murillo | (Colombia) Deportivo Cali | 1 |
| 2 | (Venezuela) Roberto Rosales | (Spain) Málaga | 1 |
| 2 | (Ecuador) Washington Vera | (Ecuador) Barcelona | 1 |

== See also ==
- 2015 Supercopa Euroamericana
