= Juan Cáceres (footballer, born 1949) =

Peruvian footballer

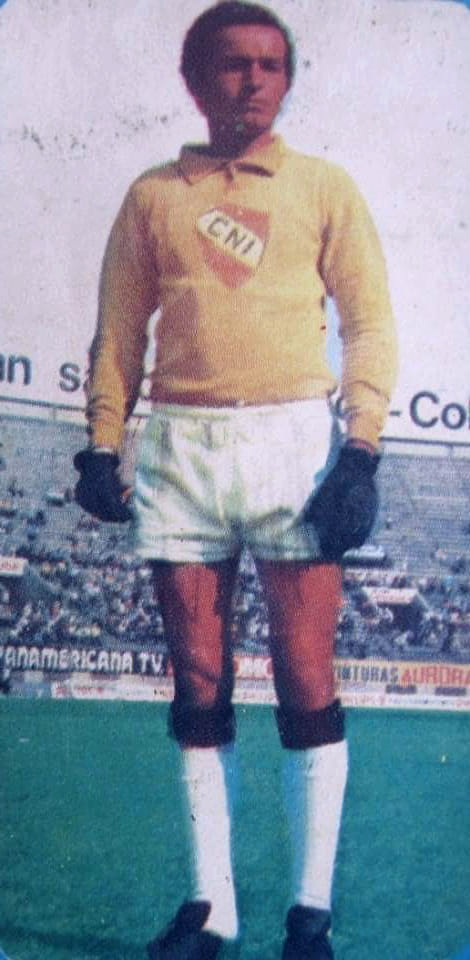
- Cáceres in 1974

Personal information
- Full name: Juan José Cáceres Palomares
- Date of birth: 27 December 1949 (age 76)
- Place of birth: Chancay, Department of Lima, Peru
- Position: Goalkeeper

Senior career*
Years	Team	Apps	(Gls)
1969–1972	Unión Huaral		
1973	Defensor Arica		
1974	CN Iquitos		
1975–1976	Universitario		
1977	Unión Huaral		
1978–1979	Alianza Lima		
1980	Melgar	13	(0)
1981	Tarma		
1983	Unión Huaral		

International career
1975	Peru	1	(0)
- * Club domestic league appearances and goals

Juan José Cáceres Palomares (born 27 December 1949) is a Peruvian football goalkeeper who played for Peru in the 1978 FIFA World Cup. He also played for Alianza Lima.
