= Copa EuroAmericana =

- Logos of Copa EuroAmericana and LFP World Challenge
- Founded: 2013
- Abolished: 2015
- Region: CONCACAF; CONMEBOL; UEFA
- Last champions: South America (1st title)
- Most championships: Europe (2 titles)
- Website: Official website

The Copa EuroAmericana was a friendly football exhibition tournament created by DirecTV that took place in the Americas. Some clubs from CONCACAF, CONMEBOL and UEFA were invited to participate in it. Since 2014, matches corresponding to Spanish teams also served as the LFP World Challenge.

== Format ==
Each match was played for 90 minutes. In case of a draw after the 90 minutes, the winners were determined via a penalty shoot-out. The confederation of the winning team of each match was awarded with a point, and the confederation with most points at the end of the tournament was declared champions.

== Winners ==
Tournament	Winners	Points	Runners-up	Points
2013	Europe	6	South America	2
2014	Europe	5	Americas	4
2015	South America	3	Europe	1

== Topscorers ==
Edition	Player	Team	Goals
2013	(Brazil) Danilo	(Portugal) Porto	3
2014	(Bulgaria) Dimitar Berbatov	(France) Monaco	2
2015	(Croatia) Duje Čop	(Spain) Malaga	2

== See also ==
- Supercopa Euroamericana
- Copa Euro-América
