= Cristian Carbajal =

Peruvian footballer (born 1999)

Personal information
- Full name: Cristian Humberto Carbajal Díaz
- Date of birth: 20 September 1999 (age 27)
- Place of birth: Lima, Peru
- Height: 1.80 m (5 ft 11 in)
- Position: Left-back

Team information
- Current team: Sport Boys
- Number: 31

Youth career
- Sporting Cristal

Senior career*
Years	Team	Apps	(Gls)
2019–2023	Sporting Cristal	2	(0)
2019–2021	→ Alianza Universidad (loan)	30	(1)
2022	→ Deportivo Binacional (loan)	7	(0)
2023	→ Sport Boys (loan)	24	(0)
2024–	Sport Boys	63	(2)

International career^{‡}
2025–	Peru	1	
- * Club domestic league appearances and goals as of 22:26, 7 November 2025 (UTC) ‡ National team caps and goals as of 00:47, 14 November 2025 (UTC)

Cristian Humberto Carbajal Díaz (born 20 September 1999) is a Peruvian footballer who plays as a left-back for Sport Boys and the Peru national team.

== Club career ==
=== Sporting Cristal ===
Carbajal is a product of Sporting Cristal. On 31 March 2019, 19-year old Carbajal made his professional debut for Sporting Cristal in the Peruvian Primera División against Deportivo Municipal. Carbajal was in the starting lineup and assisted the first goal that led the victory of Cristal, before he was subbed of in the 69th minute.

On 2 July 2019, Carbajal was loaned out to Alianza Universidad for the rest of the year to gain playing experience. He added 882 minutes of playing time in the 11 games he played in 2019. On 5 January 2020, the loan deal was extended for one further year. In January 2021, the loan deal was extended for one more year.

Carbajal returned to Sporting Cristal for the 2022 season and signed a two-year contract extension with the club on 12 January 2022. In July 2022, Carbajal was loaned out to Deportivo Binacional until the end of the year.

=== Sport Boys ===
In January 2023, Carbajal moved on loan to Sport Boys. After securing survival in the top Peruvian league, Sport Boys confirmed in late October 2023 that Carbajal had extended his contract and would be with the club permanently until the end of 2024.

== Career statistics ==
=== Club ===
As of 28 October 2023.

Club statistics
Club	Division	League			Cup		Continental		Total	
Club	Division	Season	Apps	Goals	Apps	Goals	Apps	Goals	Apps	Goals
Sporting Cristal	Liga 1	2019	2	0	—		—		2	0
Alianza Universidad	Liga 1	2019	11	1	—		—		11	1
Alianza Universidad	Liga 1	2020	13	0	—		—		13	0
Alianza Universidad	Liga 1	2021	6	0	1	0	—		7	0
Alianza Universidad	Total		30	1	1	0	0	0	31	1
Sporting Cristal	Liga 1	2022	0	0	—		—		0	0
Sporting Cristal	Total		2	0	0	0	0	0	2	0
Deportivo Binacional	Liga 1	2022	7	0	—		—		7	0
Sport Boys	Liga 1	2023	24	0	—		—		24	0
Career total			62	1	1	0	0	0	63	1

=== International ===
As of match played 12 November 2025

National team	Year	Apps	Goals
Peru	2025	1	0
Total		1	0
