= 2014 Copa EuroAmericana =

Tournament details
- Dates: 20 July – 2 August
- Teams: 13 (from 3 confederations)
- Venues: 8 (in 8 host cities)

Final positions
- Champions: Europe (2nd title)
- Runners-up: Americas

Tournament statistics
- Matches played: 9
- Goals scored: 17 (1.89 per match)
- Top scorer: (Bulgaria) Dimitar Berbatov (2 goals)

The 2014 Copa EuroAmericana was the second edition of the Copa EuroAmericana, a men's football friendly tournament created by DirecTV. This edition took place in various locations in the Americas from 20 July to 2 August 2014. Thirteen teams from CONMEBOL, CONCACAF and UEFA participated in the tournament. Europe, represented by the UEFA teams (Atlético Madrid, Fiorentina, Monaco and Valencia), won the cup by a 5–4 score, beating the Americas, represented by the CONCACAF and CONMEBOL teams (Alianza Lima, Atlético Nacional, América, Estudiantes, Junior, Palmeiras, San Jose Earthquakes, Universidad Católica and Universitario).

== Format ==
Each match was played for 90 minutes. In case of a draw after regulation, the winner was determined via a penalty shoot-out. The confederation of the winning team for each match was awarded a point, and the confederation with the most points at the end of the tournament was crowned champions.

== Participating teams ==
Confederation	Team	Most recent domestic honour	Latest continental performance
CONCACAF	(Mexico) América	2013 Torneo Clausura	2013–14 CONCACAF Champions League – Group stage
CONCACAF	(United States) San Jose Earthquakes	MLS Cup 2003	2013–14 CONCACAF Champions League – Quarter-finals
CONMEBOL	(Argentina) Estudiantes	2010–11 Torneo Apertura	2011 Copa Libertadores – Round of 16
CONMEBOL	(Brazil) Palmeiras	2013 Série B	2013 Copa Libertadores – Round of 16
CONMEBOL	(Chile) Universidad Católica	2011 Copa Chile	2013 Copa Sudamericana – Round of 16
CONMEBOL	(Colombia) Atlético Nacional	2014 Torneo Apertura	2014 Copa Libertadores – Quarter-finals
CONMEBOL	(Colombia) Junior	2011 Torneo Finalización	2012 Copa Libertadores – Second stage
CONMEBOL	(Peru) Alianza Lima	2014 Copa Inca	2012 Copa Libertadores – Second stage
CONMEBOL	(Peru) Universitario	2013 Torneo Descentralizado	2014 Copa Libertadores – Second stage
UEFA	(Spain) Atlético Madrid	2013–14 La Liga	2013–14 UEFA Champions League – Runners-up
UEFA	(Spain) Valencia	2007–08 Copa del Rey	2013–14 UEFA Europa League – Semi-finals
UEFA	(France) Monaco	2012–13 Ligue 2	2005–06 UEFA Cup – Round of 32
UEFA	(Italy) Fiorentina	2000–01 Coppa Italia	2013–14 UEFA Europa League – Round of 16

== Venues ==
Barranquilla	Lima	Mexico City	San Francisco
Estadio Metropolitano	Estadio Nacional	Estadio Azteca	Candlestick Park
Colombia	Peru	Mexico	United States
Capacity: 46,788	Capacity: 50,000	Capacity: 105,000	Capacity: 69,000
Miami	La Plata	Santiago	São Paulo
Marlins Park	Estadio Ciudad de La Plata	Estadio San Carlos de Apoquindo	Estádio do Pacaembu
United States	Argentina	Chile	Brazil
Capacity: 36,742	Capacity: 53,000	Capacity: 16,000	Capacity: 40,199

== Standings ==
Americas; Points: 4	Europe; Points: 5

== Matches ==
20 July 2014
17:00 UTC−05:00

Junior (Colombia)	0–1	(France) Monaco
	Report	Berbatov 45+1'

Estadio Metropolitano, Barranquilla, Colombia
Attendance: 45,000
Referee: Hernando Buitrago (Colombia)

23 July 2014
19:00 UTC−05:00

Atlético Nacional (Colombia)	2–4	(France) Monaco
Tréllez 63'; Pérez 88'	Report	Martial 6'; Berbatov 16'; Fabinho 39'; Carrasco 90+2'

Marlins Park, Miami, United States
Attendance: 15,102
Referee: Mark Kadlecik (United States)

26 July 2014
15:00 UTC−03:00

Estudiantes (Argentina)	0–1	(Italy) Fiorentina
	Report	Gómez 29'

Estadio Ciudad de La Plata, La Plata, Argentina
Attendance: 12,000
Referee: Néstor Pitana (Argentina)

26 July 2014
17:30 UTC−05:00

Alianza Lima (Peru)	2–2	(Spain) Valencia
Guevgeozián 13'; Montes 27'	Report	Alcácer 56'; Otamendi 62'
Penalties
Ibáñez (penalty scored); Aparicio (penalty scored); Trujillo (penalty missed); Uribe (penalty scored); González-Vigil (penalty scored); Kahn (penalty scored); Guizasola (penalty scored); Molina (penalty missed); Donayre (penalty scored); Forsyth (penalty scored); Ibáñez (penalty scored)	9–8	(penalty scored) Alcácer; (penalty scored) Otamendi; (penalty scored) Gomes; (penalty scored) Barragán; (penalty missed) De Paul; (penalty scored) Fuego; (penalty scored) Ruiz; (penalty missed) Platero; (penalty scored) Gayà; (penalty scored) Domènech; (penalty missed) Alcácer

Estadio Nacional, Lima, Peru
Attendance: 10,000
Referee: Manuel Garay (Peru)

27 July 2014
17:00 UTC−06:00

San Jose Earthquakes (United States)	0–0	(Spain) Atlético Madrid
	Report
Penalties
Stephenson (penalty missed); Cronin (penalty scored); Schuler (penalty missed); Francis (penalty scored); Barklage (penalty scored)	3–4	(penalty scored) Siqueira; (penalty scored) Gabi; (penalty missed) Miranda; (penalty scored) Suárez; (penalty scored) Saúl

Candlestick Park, San Francisco, United States
Attendance: 15,558
Referee: Ramón Hernández (United States)

29 July 2014
19:00 UTC−05:00

Universidad Católica (Chile)	1–0	(Spain) Valencia
Muñoz 89'	Report

Estadio San Carlos de Apoquindo, Santiago, Chile
Attendance: 10,000
Referee: Enrique Osses (Chile)

30 July 2014
16:00 UTC−06:00

América (Mexico)	0–0	(Spain) Atlético Madrid
	Report
Penalties
R. Jiménez (penalty scored); Zúñiga (penalty scored); Velasco (penalty missed); Burón (penalty missed); H. González (penalty scored)	3–2	(penalty scored) Gabi; (penalty missed) Siqueira; (penalty missed) Koke; (penalty missed) Suárez; (penalty scored) Miranda

Estadio Azteca, Mexico City, Mexico
Attendance: 40,000
Referee: Roberto García Orozco (Mexico)

30 July 2014
21:00 UTC−03:00

Palmeiras (Brazil)	2–1	(Italy) Fiorentina
Victor Luis 14'; Leandro 35'	Report	Rossi 72'

Estádio do Pacaembu, São Paulo, Brazil
Attendance: 20,285
Referee: Raphael Claus (Brazil)

2 August 2014
18:00 UTC−05:00

Universitario (Peru)	0–1	(Italy) Fiorentina
	Report	Brillante 33'

Estadio Nacional, Lima, Peru
Attendance: 10,000
Referee: Víctor Carrillo (Peru)

== Top goalscorers ==
Rank	Name	Team	Goals
1	(Bulgaria) Dimitar Berbatov	(France) Monaco	2
2	(Spain) Paco Alcácer	(Spain) Valencia	1
2	(Australia) Joshua Brillante	(Italy) Fiorentina	1
2	(Brazil) Fabinho	(France) Monaco	1
2	(Belgium) Yannick Carrasco	(France) Monaco	1
2	(Germany) Mario Gómez	(Italy) Fiorentina	1
2	(Armenia) Mauro Guevgeozián	(Peru) Alianza Lima	1
2	(Brazil) Leandro	(Brazil) Palmeiras	1
2	(France) Anthony Martial	(France) Monaco	1
2	(Peru) Mauricio Montes	(Peru) Alianza Lima	1
2	(Chile) José Luis Muñoz	(Chile) Universidad Católica	1
2	(Argentina) Nicolás Otamendi	(Spain) Valencia	1
2	(Colombia) Sebastián Pérez	(Colombia) Atlético Nacional	1
2	(Italy) Giuseppe Rossi	(Italy) Fiorentina	1
2	(Colombia) Santiago Tréllez	(Colombia) Atlético Nacional	1
2	(Brazil) Victor Luis	(Brazil) Palmeiras	1
