= Juan Bromley =

Peruvian historian and lawyer (1894–1968)

Juan C. Bromley Seminario
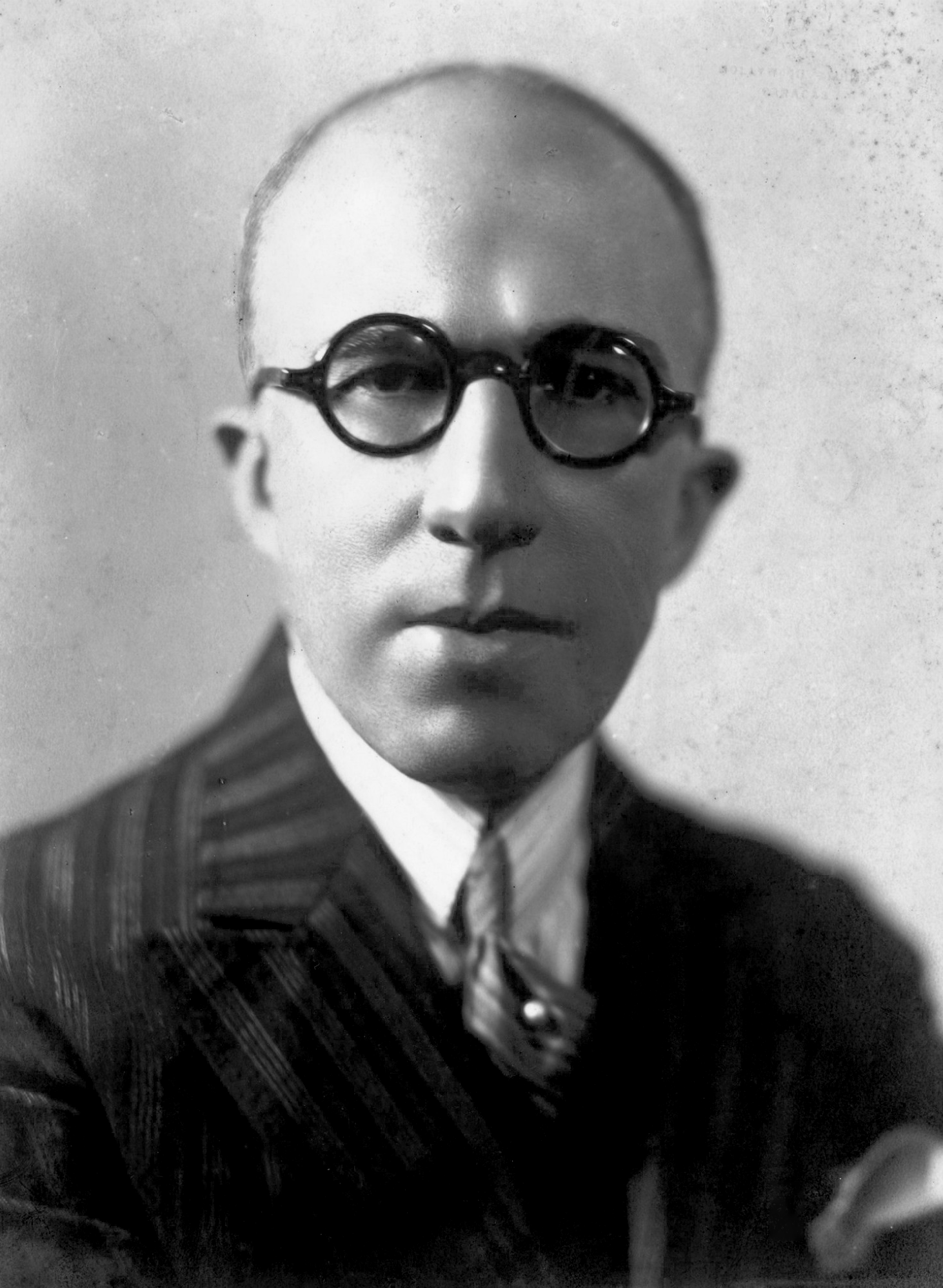
- Born: September 2, 1894; Callao, Peru
- Died: May 31, 1968 (aged 73); Lima, Peru
- Education: University of San Marcos
- Occupations: Historian, lawyer
- Notable work: Las viejas calles de Lima

Juan C. Bromley Seminario (Callao; September 2, 1894 – Lima; May 31, 1968) was a Peruvian historian and lawyer. He served as municipal secretary in the Municipality of Lima, urban planning researcher in the city of Lima, and was also president of various Peruvian soccer clubs.

== Biography ==
Born in Callao, he was a Graduate of Letters and Law from the National University of San Marcos. Until he was 65 years old, he worked in seventeen council positions for the Municipality of Lima. He received the gold medal for The Royal Standard of the City of Lima in 1927 and the grand prize of the historical contest of the fourth centennial of Lima in 1935.

He was a sports leader and between 1927 and 1931 he presided over the Club Alianza Lima, as well as founding president of Deportivo Municipal and president of the Peruvian Football Federation between 1944 and 1948.

Between 1942 and 1964 he published the transcription of 13 Books of the Cabildo of Lima, as well as the indexes of 45, including 31 Books of Charters and Provisions.

In 1945, he was a member of the Peruvian Institute for Genealogical Studies and, in 1955, of the Historical Institute of Peru. Between 1964 and 1967 he published his manuscript Las viejas calles de Lima (The old streets of Lima) in fifteen parts in the municipal bulletin.

== See also ==
- History of Lima
