= 2013 Copa EuroAmericana =

Tournament details
- Dates: 20 July – 4 August
- Teams: 11 (from 2 confederations)
- Venues: 8 (in 8 host cities)

Final positions
- Champions: Europe (1st title)
- Runners-up: South America

Tournament statistics
- Matches played: 8
- Goals scored: 22 (2.75 per match)
- Top scorer: (Brazil) Danilo (3 goals)

The 2013 Copa EuroAmericana was the first edition of the Copa EuroAmericana, an exhibition men's football friendly tournament created by DirecTV. This edition took place in various locations across South America from 20 July to 4 August 2013. Eleven teams from both CONMEBOL and UEFA participated in the tournament. Europe, represented by Atlético Madrid, Porto and Sevilla, won the cup by a 6–2 score, beating South America, represented by Atlético Nacional, Barcelona, Deportivo Anzoátegui, Estudiantes, Millonarios, Nacional, Sporting Cristal and Universidad Católica.

== Format ==
Each match was played for 90 minutes. In the case of a draw after regulation, the winners were determined via a penalty shoot-out. The confederation of the winning team of each match was awarded with a point, and the confederation with the most points at the end of the tournament was crowned champions.

== Participating teams ==
Confederation	Team	Most recent domestic honour	Latest continental performance
CONMEBOL	(Argentina) Estudiantes	2010–11 Torneo Apertura	2011 Copa Libertadores – Round of 16
CONMEBOL	(Chile) Universidad Católica	2011 Copa Chile	2012 Copa Libertadores – Second stage
CONMEBOL	(Colombia) Atlético Nacional	2013 Torneo Apertura	2012 Copa Libertadores – Round of 16
CONMEBOL	(Colombia) Millonarios	2012 Torneo Finalización	2013 Copa Libertadores – Second stage
CONMEBOL	(Ecuador) Barcelona	2012 Serie A	2013 Copa Libertadores – Second stage
CONMEBOL	(Peru) Sporting Cristal	2012 Torneo Descentralizado	2013 Copa Libertadores – Second stage
CONMEBOL	(Uruguay) Nacional	2011–12 Primera División Uruguaya	2013 Copa Libertadores – Round of 16
CONMEBOL	(Venezuela) Deportivo Anzoátegui	2012 Copa Venezuela	2013 Copa Libertadores – First stage
UEFA	(Spain) Atlético Madrid	2012–13 Copa del Rey	2012 UEFA Super Cup – Champions
UEFA	(Spain) Sevilla	2009–10 Copa del Rey	2011–12 UEFA Europa League – Play-off round
UEFA	(Portugal) Porto	2012–13 Primeira Liga	2012–13 UEFA Champions League - Round of 16

== Venues ==
Bogotá	Lima	La Plata	Guayaquil
Estadio El Campín	Estadio Nacional	Estadio Ciudad de La Plata	Estadio Monumental
Colombia	Peru	Argentina	Ecuador
Capacity: 36,343	Capacity: 50,000	Capacity: 53,000	Capacity: 59,283
Montevideo	Santiago	Puerto la Cruz	Medellín
Estadio Centenario	Estadio San Carlos de Apoquindo	Estadio José Antonio Anzoátegui	Atanasio Girardot Sports Complex
Uruguay	Chile	Venezuela	Colombia
Capacity: 65,235	Capacity: 16,000	Capacity: 37,485	Capacity: 45,739

== Standings ==
South America; Points: 2	Europe; Points: 6

== Matches ==
20 July 2013
17:30 UTC–04:00

Universidad Católica (Chile)	0–2	(Spain) Sevilla
	Report	Marin 60'; Jairo 83'

Estadio San Carlos de Apoquindo, Santiago, Chile
Attendance: 15,000
Referee: Eduardo Gamboa (Chile)

21 July 2013
19:00 UTC–04:30

Deportivo Anzoátegui (Venezuela)	2–4	(Portugal) Porto
Aguilar 39'; Fuenmayor 62'	Report	Martínez 53'; Mangala 64'; Varela 65', 90+3'

Estadio José Antonio Anzoátegui, Puerto la Cruz, Venezuela
Attendance: 10,000
Referee: Maiker Moreno (Venezuela)

23 July 2013
19:30 UTC–05:00

Atlético Nacional (Colombia)	1–1	(Spain) Sevilla
Cárdenas 44'	Report	Coke 65'
Penalties
Uribe (penalty scored); Arias (penalty missed); Nájera (penalty missed); Valencia (penalty scored); Guisao (penalty scored); Murillo (penalty scored)	4–3	(penalty scored) Rakitić; (penalty missed) Moreno; (penalty missed) Coke; (penalty scored) Jairo; (penalty scored) Bacca; (penalty missed) Cotán

Atanasio Girardot Sports Complex, Medellín, Colombia
Attendance: 20,000
Referee: Adrián Vélez (Colombia)

24 July 2013
21:30 UTC–05:00

Millonarios (Colombia)	0–4	(Portugal) Porto
	Report	Danilo 29', 52', 72'; Martínez 85'

Estadio El Campín, Bogotá, Colombia
Attendance: 20,000
Referee: Juan Soto (Venezuela)

26 July 2013
19:30 UTC–05:00

Barcelona (Ecuador)	1–3	(Spain) Sevilla
Caicedo 4' (pen.)	Report	Pareja 72'; Jairo 79'; Bacca 86'

Estadio Monumental, Guayaquil, Ecuador
Attendance: 5,000
Referee: Víctor Hugo Carrillo (Peru)

27 July 2013
15:00 UTC–03:00

Estudiantes (Argentina)	1–0	(Spain) Atlético Madrid
Zapata 23'	Report

Estadio Ciudad de La Plata, La Plata, Argentina
Attendance: 37,000
Referee: Darío Ubriaco (Uruguay)

31 July 2013
20:00 UTC–05:00

Sporting Cristal (Peru)	0–1	(Spain) Atlético Madrid
	Report	Suárez 78'

Estadio Nacional, Lima, Peru
Attendance: 19,500
Referee: Omar Ponce (Ecuador)

4 August 2013
15:00 UTC–03:00

Nacional (Uruguay)	0–2	(Spain) Atlético Madrid
	Report	Baptistão 46', 80'

Estadio Centenario, Montevideo, Uruguay
Attendance: 48,000
Referee: Saúl Laverni (Argentina)

== Top goalscorers ==
Rank	Name	Team	Goals
1	(Brazil) Danilo	(Portugal) Porto	3
2	(Brazil) Léo Baptistão	(Spain) Atlético Madrid	2
2	(Colombia) Jackson Martínez	(Portugal) Porto	2
2	(Spain) Jairo Samperio	(Spain) Sevilla	2
2	(Portugal) Silvestre Varela	(Portugal) Porto	2
