= Copa Euro-América =

- Organiser(s): Bundesliga and CBF
- Founded: 1991
- Abolished: 1999
- Region: Brazil
- Teams: 3–4
- Most championships: Palmeiras (2 titles)

The Copa Euro-América (English: Euro-America Cup), was a friendly tournament organized by CBF and Bundesliga. Due the fact that the German league at the time had no matches scheduled in January, Interseason tournaments were organized in the middle of the Brazilian summer. In all, three editions of the competition were held: 1991, 1996 and 1999.

== List of champions ==
Following is the list with all the champions of the Copa Euro-América:

Season	Champions	Runners-up	Third place	Fourth place
1991	(Brazil) Palmeiras	(Brazil) Corinthians	(Germany) VfB Stuttgart	(Germany) Hamburger SV
1996	(Brazil) Palmeiras	(Brazil) Flamengo	(Germany) Borussia Dortmund	—N/a
1999	(Brazil) São Paulo	(Germany) Bayer Leverkusen	(Paraguay) Olimpia	—N/a

== Notable matches ==
22 January 1996

Palmeiras (Brazil)	6–1	(Germany) Borussia Dortmund
Rivaldo 24' (pen.), 68', 88'; Luizão 42'; Cafu 79'; Elivélton 84'	Report	Tretschok 53'

Castelão, Fortaleza
Referee: Marcos Brasil

20 January 1999

São Paulo (Brazil)	5–0	(Germany) Bayer Leverkusen
Ramelow 4' (o.g.); Zé Carlos 20'; Souza 44'; Dodô 49'; Serginho 55' (pen.)

Morumbi, São Paulo
Attendance: 14,819
Referee: Edilson Pereira de Carvalho
