= Luis Ramos (footballer, born 1999) =

Peruvian footballer (born 1999)

Personal information
- Full name: Luis Alejandro Ramos Leiva
- Date of birth: 13 December 1999 (age 26)
- Place of birth: Trujillo, Peru
- Position: Striker

Team information
- Current team: América de Cali
- Number: 9

Youth career
- Academia Cantolao
- Juventud UNIDA

Senior career*
| Years | Team | Apps | (Gls) |
| 2016–2017 | Juventud UNIDA | | |
| 2018 | Andorra El Molino | | |
| 2019–2020 | Carlos A. Mannucci | 8 | (0) |
| 2021 | Deportivo Llacuabamba | 20 | (8) |
| 2022–2023 | Deportivo Municipal | 16 | (2) |
| 2022 | → Llacuabamba (loan) | 11 | (2) |
| 2023 | Los Chankas | 20 | (19) |
| 2024– | Cusco | 34 | (11) |
| 2025– | → América de Cali (loan) | 35 | (9) |

International career^{‡}
| 2024– | Peru | 7 | (0) |
- * Club domestic league appearances and goals as of 19 October 2025 ‡ National team caps and goals as of 23:26, 10 October 2025 (UTC)

Luis Alejandro Ramos Leiva (born 13 December 1999) is a Peruvian footballer who plays as a Striker for América de Cali on loan from Peruvian Primera División side Cusco FC and the Peru national team.

== Career ==
=== Club career ===
Ramos played for Cantolao, Juventud UNIDA in Trujillo and Andorra El Molino, before joining Carlos A. Mannucci. During his time in Juventud UNIDA, Ramos played in the Copa Peru in a young age. 17-year old Ramos scored 12 goals in the cup, which earned him a spot on the Peruvian U18 national team, after playing three friendly games where he scored three goals, in a national team training camp for young Copa Peru players in Trujillo.

Ramos got his debut in the Peruvian Primera División for Carlos A. Mannucci on 11 May 2019 against Sport Boys. He was in the starting lineup, but was replaced by Kevin Manuel Moreno after 65 minutes. He played a total of six games in the 2019 season and only one game in the 2020 season.

Ramos decided to leave Carlos A. Mannucci for the 2021, to chase more playing time elsewhere. He ended up joining Peruvian Segunda División club Deportivo Llacuabamba at the end of February 2021. After a good season at Llacuabamba, Ramos returned to the Primera División, after signing with Deportivo Municipal on 10 December 2021. To get some more playing time, Ramos was loaned out to Segunda Division side Deportivo Llacuabamba in June 2022 until the end of the year. He returned to Municipal ahead of the 2023 season, and played 15 league games for the club until he left in June 2023.

On 19 June 2023, Ramos joined Peruvian Segunda División side Los Chankas. After a good season af Los Chankas, Ramos was signed by Peruvian Primera División side Cusco FC ahead of the 2024 season.

== Career statistics ==
=== International ===
As of match played on 10 October 2025

Appearances and goals by national team and year
| National team | Year | Apps | Goals |
|---|---|---|---|
| Peru | 2024 | 2 | 0 |
| Peru | 2025 | 5 | 0 |
| Total | | 7 | 0 |
