= Alejandro Villanueva Stadium =

Stadium in Lima, Peru

Estadio Alejandro Villanueva
- Matute
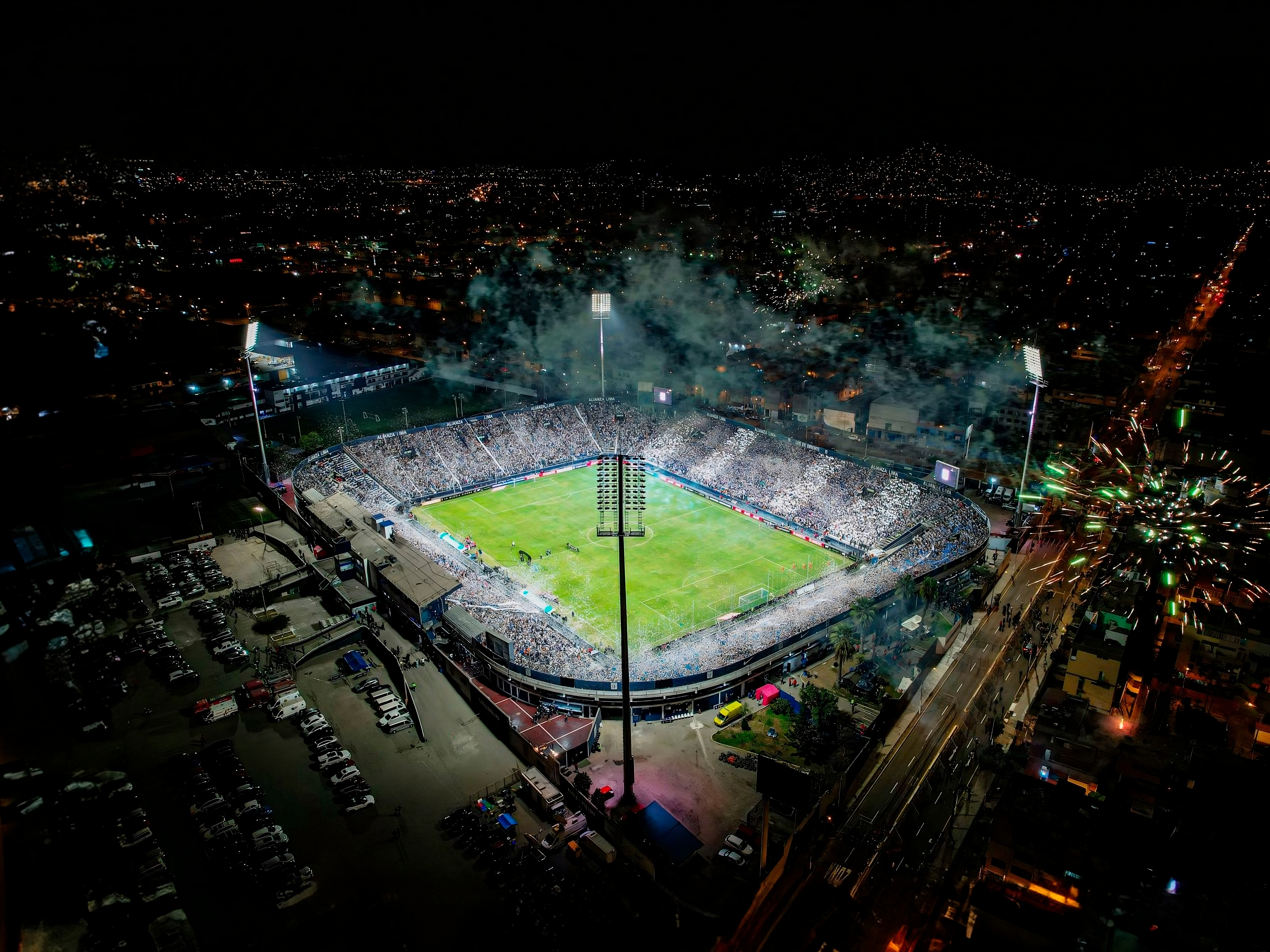
- Interactive map of Estadio Alejandro Villanueva
- Former names: Estadio Alianza Lima (1974–2000)
- Location: La Victoria District, Lima, Peru
- Coordinates: 12°4′7″S 77°1′22″W
- Owner: Club Alianza Lima
- Capacity: 33,938
- Surface: Grass
- Record attendance: 40,019 (December 9, 1987)
- Field size: 105 x 70 m
- Public transit: at Av. Isabel la Católica

Construction
- Groundbreaking: 30 May 1969
- Built: 1969–1974
- Opened: 27 December 1974
- Architect: Walter Lavalleja
- Project managers: Walter Lavalleja & Alfonso de Souza Ferreyra

Tenants
- Club Alianza Lima (1974–present); Peru national football team (selected matches)

The Estadio Alejandro Villanueva, popularly known as Matute, is a football stadium located in the Matute neighborhood of the La Victoria district in Lima, Peru. The venue is owned by Club Alianza Lima, and it is here that the club plays at home in the Peruvian Primera División, and in international tournaments such as the Copa Libertadores or the Copa Sudamericana. With a capacity of 33,938, it is often nicknamed La Caldera, ''the Boiler'', for its intense atmosphere during home games. It is named after one of Alianza Lima's greatest ever players, Alejandro Villanueva.

The stadium was registered as an alternate venue of the Peru national football team for the 2018 FIFA World Cup qualification and was also considered as a possible venue for the 2019 Pan American Games held in Lima. It was designed by Uruguayan engineer, Walter Lavalleja, who also participated in the construction in seven other stadiums in South America.

== History ==
In 1951, the President of Peru donated the land where the Alianza Lima stadium would be built which was owned by the Peruvian State. On February 15, 195, in commemoration of the club's fiftieth anniversary, General Manuel Odría laid the first stone of the new stadium. However, due to economic problems, the project was postponed indefinitely. Initially, the stadium was planned to have a capacity of 60,000 spectators. During this stage, the idea of naming the stadium after the historic player Alejandro Villanueva arose, a fact that occurred decades later.

On April 11, 1965, it was announced at a press conference by Walter Lavalleja that a stadium was to be built in Lima for the club Alianza Lima. This was made possible by the president at that time, Manuel Odria, who donated a piece of land for the construction of the stadium. On May 30, 1969, the first phase of the project began.

The stadium was inaugurated with the "Señor de Los Milagros" tournament featuring Alianza Lima, city rivals Universitario de Deportes, Nacional of Uruguay, and Independiente of Argentina. The stadium opened on December 27, 1974, with a capacity of 36,966 spectators and was inaugurated with Alianza Lima drawing 2–2 with Nacional. On March 2, 1975, the first Peruvian Clásico at the stadium was held between Alianza Lima and Universitario, resulting in a 3–1 victory for the home team. Later, on July 1, 1975, the stadium held its first national team match, a friendly between Peru and Ecuador, in which Peru won 2–0. It was one the venues used by Peru during the 1975 Copa América, in which they won.

In December 1987, after the 1987 Alianza Lima plane crash, that was transporting the Alianza Lima squad from Pucallpa to Lima, the stadium hosted the wake of the bodies rescued from the waters of the Ventanilla Sea. In the following days, a double of international friendlies was held (Universitario vs Universidad Católica and Alianza Lima vs Independiente) with the purpose of raising money for the relatives of the Alianza Lima delegation, barristas and three referees. 40,019 spectators attended, making it the record attendance at the stadium.

The stadium has carried the club name since its opening. However, in 2000, with Alianza Lima's centennial anniversary approaching, the club rechristened the stadium name to Estadio Alejandro Villanueva in honor one of one their most important players, Alejandro Villanueva.

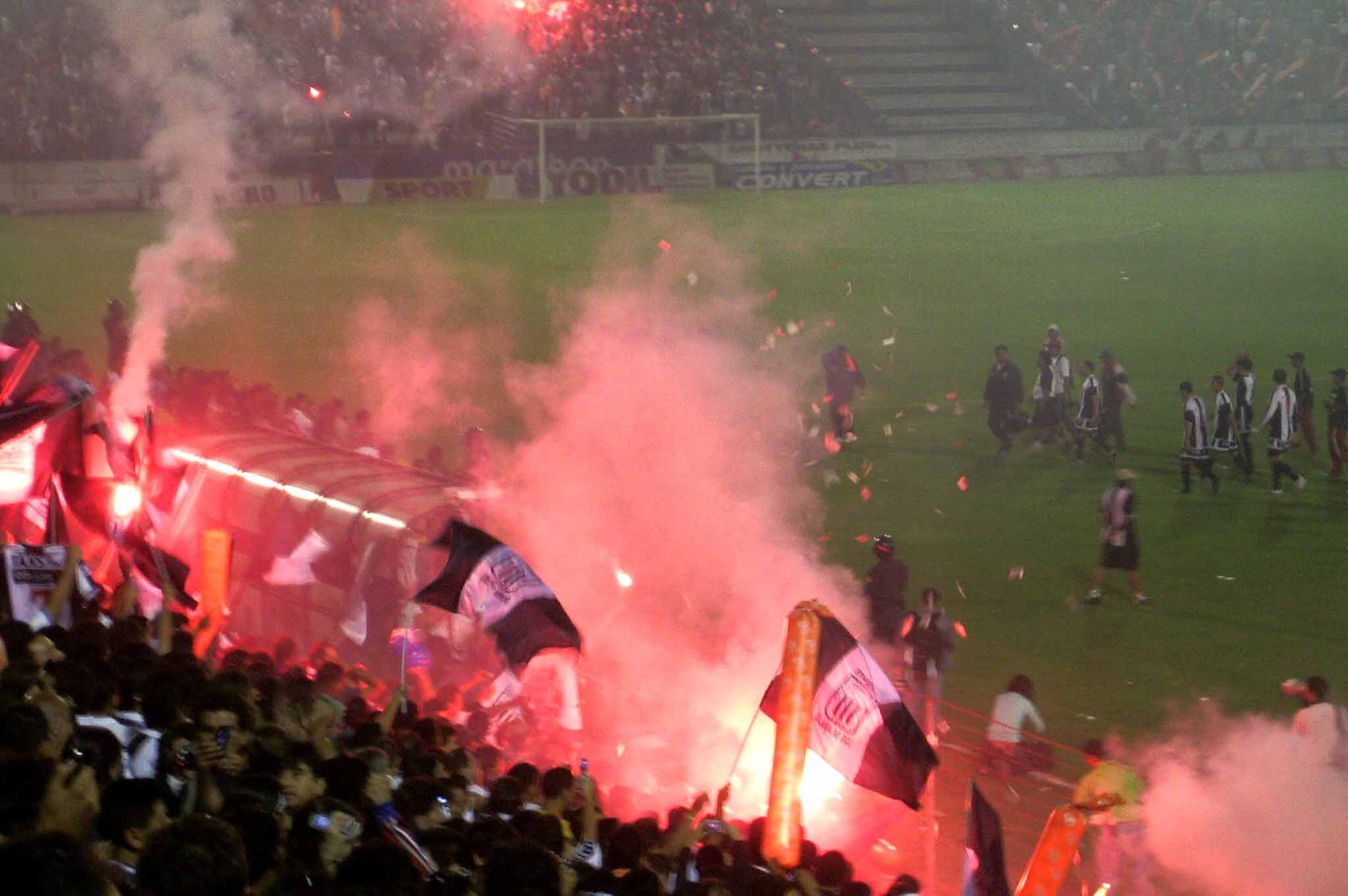
Estadio Alejandro Villanueva in the final of the 2006 Torneo Descentralizado

Currently, the Blue and Whites Fund, a group of investors managed by the club, is considering development of an ambitious project for the expansion and total modernization of the stadium. This would include the 4 tribunes, playing field, underlying buildings, alternate court, Villa Intima and surroundings of the enclosure. The expansion is expected to provide Alejandro Villanueva with a capacity of 55,000 spectators. Multiple concepts for the future stadium were presented, but none were ever constructed.

Alianza Lima was relegated to the Second Division on November 28, 2020, after losing 2–0 to Sport Huancayo, although its status was later reinstated thanks to a ruling by the Court of Arbitration for Sport (CAS) or in Spanish known as TAS.

On November 8, 2023, the Estadio Alejandro Villanueva held the away match between Alianza Lima and Universitario de Deportes to determine the champion of 2023 Liga 1. Previously, security measures were agreed between the National Police of Peru, and the Peruvian Football Federation. After Universitario's 2–0 victory, the stadium lights went out, preventing the award ceremony. Although the Universitario players celebrated with a flare thrown by an Alianza Lima fan. Days later, José Sabogal, Administrator of Alianza Lima, admitted to ordering the lights to be turned off after defeat for security, assuming responsibility for the consequences. The FPF's Justice Commission sanctioned Alianza Lima, prohibiting it from playing at home in its stadium for seven months in competitions organized by them, due to previous incidents and the blackout caused at the end of the match.

In June 2024, Alianza Lima presented a new, European style concept of the new stadium. With more money from the club, the new renovated stadium is now able to begin construction. It is planned to have a capacity of over 47,000 spectators and its construction is expected to begin between 2026 and 2027.

On April 3, 2026, a wall collapsed at the stadium during a flag-waving event for the Alianza Lima club, killing one person and injuring at least 47 others.

== Facilities ==
The main infrastructure of the stadium consists of the main field, three P10 LED screens of 25 m^{2} each and an LED perimeter fence that is used to display advertising during matches. Likewise, the stadium has a lighting system of 1700 luxes, exceeding the CONMEBOL and FIFA requirements for international matches. As of 2025, the stadiums official capacity is 33,938, however in some cases it can increase to 35,000.

In the same way, within the stadium land is the complex of the club's lower divisions that includes the Teófilo Cubillas auxiliary field that is located behind the north stand, and the Intimate Village, which is the place where the first team is concentrated. The stadium grounds also contains administrative offices, gym, press room, trophy room, medical department, and a museum.

== International matches ==
Date	Team #1	Score	Team #2	Competition
1 July 1975	Peru	2–0	Ecuador	Friendly
10 July 1975	Peru	2–0	Paraguay	Friendly
7 August 1975	Peru	3–1	Bolivia	1975 Copa América
20 August 1975	Peru	3–1	Chile	1975 Copa América
4 November 1975	Peru	3–1	Brazil	1975 Copa América
12 November 1980	Peru	1–1	Uruguay	Friendly
4 February 1981	Peru	1–3	Czechoslovakia	Friendly
11 February 1981	Peru	1–2	Bulgaria	Friendly
26 February 1984	Peru	1–3	Honduras	Friendly
23 June 1999	Peru	3–0	Venezuela	Friendly
23 February 2003	Peru	5–1	Haiti	Friendly
11 February 2009	Peru	0–1	Paraguay	Friendly
14 October 2009	Peru	1–0	Bolivia	2010 FIFA World Cup qualification
8 October 2010	Peru	2–0	Costa Rica	Friendly
29 June 2011	Peru	1–0	Senegal	Friendly
14 October 2014	Peru	1–0	Guatemala	Friendly
22 March 2024	Peru	2–0	Nicaragua	Friendly

== See also ==
- List of football stadiums in Peru
- Lists of stadiums
- Club Alianza Lima
