= List of football clubs in Peru =

This is a non-exhaustive list of football clubs in Peru with the current 19 first division teams, 15 second division teams and 37 third division teams as of 2025. The Copa Perú has variable number of teams from the rest of the country. In 2022, more than 33,000 teams entered the competition in its different stages.

== Liga 1 (2025) ==
Club	City	Region	Stadium
ADT	Tarma	Junín	Unión Tarma
Alianza Atlético	Sullana	Piura	Campeones del 36
Alianza Lima	Lima	Lima	Alejandro Villanueva
Alianza Universidad	Huánuco	Huánuco	Heraclio Tapia
Atlético Grau	Piura	Piura	Miguel Grau (Piura)
Ayacucho	Ayacucho	Ayacucho	Ciudad de Cumaná
Binacional	Juliaca	Puno	Guillermo Briceño Rosamedina
Cienciano	Cusco	Cusco	Garcilaso
Comerciantes Unidos	Cutervo	Cajamarca	Juan Maldonado Gamarra
Cusco	Cusco	Cusco	Garcilaso
Deportivo Garcilaso	Cusco	Cusco	Garcilaso
Los Chankas	Andahuaylas	Apurímac	Municipal Los Chankas
Juan Pablo II College	Chongoyape	Lambayeque	Complejo Juan Pablo II
Melgar	Arequipa	Arequipa	Virgen de Chapi
Sport Boys	Callao	Callao	Miguel Grau
Sport Huancayo	Huancayo	Junín	Huancayo
Sporting Cristal	Lima	Lima	Alberto Gallardo
Universitario	Lima	Lima	Monumental
UTC	Cajamarca	Cajamarca	Héroes de San Ramón

== Liga 2 (2025) ==
Club	City	Region	Stadium
Academia Cantolao	Callao	Callao	Miguel Grau
ADA	Jaén	Cajamarca	Víctor Montoya Segura
Bentín Tacna Heroica	Tacna	Tacna	Jorge Basadre
Cajamarca	Cajamarca	Cajamarca	Héroes de San Ramón
Carlos A. Mannucci	Trujillo	La Libertad	Mansiche
Comerciantes	Belén	Loreto	Max Augustín
Deportivo Coopsol	Chancay	Lima	Rómulo Shaw Cisneros
Deportivo Llacuabamba	Pataz	La Libertad	Comunal de Llacuabamba
Deportivo Moquegua	Moquegua	Moquegua	25 de Noviembre
Pirata	Lambayeque	Lambayeque	César Flores Marigorda
San Marcos	Huari	Áncash	Rosas Pampa
Santos	Nasca	Ica	Municipal de Nasca
Unión Comercio	Nueva Cajamarca	San Martín	Carlos Vidaurre Garcia
Universidad César Vallejo	Trujillo	La Libertad	César Acuña Peralta
Universidad San Martín	Lima	Lima	Universidad San Marcos

== Liga 3 (2025) ==
Club	City	Region	Stadium
ADT II	Tarma	Junín	Unión Tarma
Alianza Lima II	Lima	Lima	Alejandro Villanueva
Alto Rendimiento	Tambopata	Madre de Dios	IPD de Puerto Maldonado
Amazon Callao	Callao	Callao	Facundo Ramírez Aguilar
Carlos Stein	Chongoyape	Lambayeque	César Flores Marigorda
Centro Social Pariacoto	Pariacoto	Áncash	Municipal de Pariacoto
Cienciano II	Cusco	Cusco	Garcilaso
Construcción Civil	Huánuco	Huánuco	Heraclio Tapia
Cultural Volante	Bambamarca	Cajamarca	El Frutillo
Defensor José María Arguedas	Andahuaylas	Apurímac	Los Chankas
Deportivo Lute	Zaña	Lambayeque	César Flores Marigorda
Deportivo Municipal	Lima	Lima	Municipal de Chorrillos
Deportivo Municipal (Pangoa)	Pichanaqui	Junín	Malaquias Cóndor Aire
Deportivo Ucrania	Nueva Cajamarca	San Martín	IPD de Nueva Cajamarca
Diablos Rojos	Juliaca	Puno	Guillermo Briceño Rosamedina
Ecosem Pasco	Cerro de Pasco	Pasco	Daniel Alcides Carrión
Estudiantil CNI	Iquitos	Loreto	Max Augustín
Juan Aurich	Chiclayo	Lambayeque	Elías Aguirre
Juventud Alfa	Písac	Cusco	Thomas Ernesto Payne
Juventud Cautivo	San Miguel de El Faique	Piura	Municipal
Juventud Santo Domingo	Nasca	Ica	Municipal de Nasca
Juventus	Huamachuco	La Libertad	Municipal de Huamachuco
Melgar II	Arequipa	Arequipa	Virgen de Chapi
Nacional	Mollendo	Arequipa	Municipal de Mollendo
Nuevo San Cristóbal	Kimbiri	Cusco	Municipal de Kimbiri
Pacífico	San Martín de Porres	Lima	José Granda
Patriotas	Tacna	Tacna	Jorge Basadre
Rauker	Pucallpa	Ucayali	Aliardo Soria Pérez
Real San Antonio	Moquegua	Moquegua	25 de Noviembre
Sport Bolognesi	Zarumilla	Tumbes	24 de Julio
Sport Boys II	Callao	Callao	Miguel Grau
Sport Huancayo II	Huancayo	Junín	Huancayo
UDA	Ascensión	Huancavelica	IPD de Huancavelica
Unión Huaral	Huaral	Lima	Julio Lores Colan
Unión Santo Domingo	Chachapoyas	Amazonas	Gran Kuélap
Universidad César Vallejo II	Trujillo	La Libertad	Mansiche
Universitario II	Lima	Lima	Monumental

== Copa Perú ==
The following is a list of notable football clubs in Peru sorted by region.

=== Liga Departamental de Amazonas ===
Club	City	Region	Stadium
Agricobank San Lorenzo	Bagua	Amazonas	Manuel Mesones
Alfonso Ugarte (La Peca)	La Peca	Amazonas	Manuel Mesones
Asociación de Entrenadores	Chachapoyas	Amazonas	Gran Kuélap
Bagua Grande	Chachapoyas	Amazonas	Municipal San Luis
Cruz Roja	Bagua Grande	Amazonas	Municipal San Luis
Cultural Utcubamba	Bagua Grande	Amazonas	Municipal San Luis
Deportivo Cali	Chachapoyas	Amazonas	Gran Kuélap
Deportivo Hospital	Chachapoyas	Amazonas	Gran Kuélap
Deportivo Municipal (Jazán)	Jazán	Amazonas	Municipal de Pedro Ruíz Gallo
Higos Urco	Chachapoyas	Amazonas	Gran Kuélap
Juventud Tushpuna	Chachapoyas	Amazonas	Gran Kuélap
Sachapuyos	Chachapoyas	Amazonas	Gran Kuélap
San Francisco de Asís	Lonya Grande	Amazonas	Municipal San Luis
San Luis	Bagua Grande	Amazonas	Municipal San Luis
Sport Kuélap	Chachapoyas	Amazonas	Gran Kuélap
Sporting Victoria	Bagua Grande	Amazonas	Municipal San Luis
Unión Comercial	Pedro Ruíz Gallo	Amazonas	Municipal de Pedro Ruíz Gallo

=== Liga Departamental de Ancash ===
Club	City	Region	Stadium
Academia Francisco Ríos	Chimbote	Áncash	Manuel Rivera Sánchez
Alianza Corazón Casmeño	Casma	Áncash	Valeriano López
Cultural Casma	Casma	Áncash	Valeriano López
Defensor River Santa	Carhuaz	Áncash	Municipal de Carhuaz
Defensor Strong Boys	Chimbote	Áncash	Manuel Rivera Sánchez
DELUSA	Casma	Áncash	Valeriano López
Estrella Roja	Carhuaz	Áncash	Municipal de Carhuaz
Huracán de Toma	Carhuaz	Áncash	Municipal de Carhuaz
José Gálvez	Chimbote	Áncash	Manuel Rivera Sánchez
Juan Pablo II	Casma	Áncash	Valeriano López
Juventud La Unión	Chimbote	Áncash	Manuel Rivera Sánchez
La Parada	Casma	Áncash	Valeriano López
Los Pumas	Casma	Áncash	Valeriano López
Nueva Generación	Carhuaz	Áncash	Municipal de Carhuaz
Once Hermanos	Carhuaz	Áncash	Municipal de Carhuaz
Ovación Miraflores	Chimbote	Áncash	Manuel Rivera Sánchez
Ramón Castilla	San Luis	Áncash	Municipal de San Luis
Rosario	Huaraz	Áncash	Rosas Pampa
San Miguel de Chucchún	Carhuaz	Áncash	Municipal de Carhuaz
Sider Perú	Chimbote	Áncash	Manuel Rivera Sánchez
Sport Áncash	Huaraz	Áncash	Rosas Pampa
Sport Boys	Casma	Áncash	Valeriano López
Sport Huaquilla	Casma	Áncash	Valeriano López
Sport Inca	Casma	Áncash	Valeriano López
Star Áncash	Huaraz	Áncash	Rosas Pampa
Transportes Pablito	Carhuaz	Áncash	Municipal de Carhuaz
Unión Deportivo Victoria	Chimbote	Áncash	Manuel Rivera Sánchez
Unión Juventud	Chimbote	Áncash	Manuel Rivera Sánchez

=== Liga Departamental de Apurímac ===
Club	City	Region	Stadium
Academia El Olivo	Abancay	Apurímac	Monumental de Condebamba
ADEU	Andahuaylas	Apurímac	Los Chankas
Chankatex Buendía	Andahuaylas	Apurímac	Los Chankas
Construcción Civil	Abancay	Apurímac	Monumental de Condebamba
Deportivo Curibamba	Andahuaylas	Apurímac	Los Chankas
Deportivo Educación	Abancay	Apurímac	Monumental de Condebamba
EFUCH	Andahuaylas	Apurímac	Los Chankas
José María Arguedas	Andahuaylas	Apurímac	Los Chankas
La Victoria	Abancay	Apurímac	Monumental de Condebamba
Miguel Grau	Abancay	Apurímac	Monumental de Condebamba
Peña Sport	Abancay	Apurímac	Monumental de Condebamba
Siempre Chankas	Andahuaylas	Apurímac	Los Chankas
Social El Olivo	Abancay	Apurímac	Monumental de Condebamba
Sport Juvenil	Andahuaylas	Apurímac	Los Chankas
Sport Salinas	Andahuaylas	Apurímac	Los Chankas
UNAJMA	Andahuaylas	Apurímac	Los Chankas
UNSAAC	Andahuaylas	Apurímac	Los Chankas
Universitario UTEA	Abancay	Apurímac	Monumental de Condebamba

=== Liga Departamental de Arequipa ===
Club	City	Region	Stadium
Alto Inclán	Mollendo	Arequipa	Municipal de Mollendo
Alto Las Cruces	Mollendo	Arequipa	Municipal de Mollendo
Atlético Mollendo	Mollendo	Arequipa	Municipal de Mollendo
Atlético Universidad	Arequipa	Arequipa	Mariano Melgar
Aurora	Arequipa	Arequipa	Mariano Melgar
Buenos Aires	Camaná	Arequipa	9 de Noviembre
Defensor Lima	Camaná	Arequipa	9 de Noviembre
Defensor Villa Lourdes	Mollendo	Arequipa	Municipal de Mollendo
Deportivo Camaná	Camaná	Arequipa	9 de Noviembre
Deportivo Estrella	Camaná	Arequipa	9 de Noviembre
Deportivo Islay	Mollendo	Arequipa	Municipal de Mollendo
Deportivo Majes	Majes	Arequipa	Municipal de Majes
Deportivo Temperley	Arequipa	Arequipa	Mariano Melgar
Francisco Bolognesi	Mollendo	Arequipa	Municipal de Mollendo
Futuro Majes	Majes	Arequipa	Municipal de Majes
Inclán Sport	Mollendo	Arequipa	Municipal de Mollendo
Independencia	Arequipa	Arequipa	Mariano Melgar
Internacional	Arequipa	Arequipa	Mariano Melgar
Marítimo Sport	Mollendo	Arequipa	Municipal de Mollendo
Piérola	Arequipa	Arequipa	Mariano Melgar
Primero de Mayo	Mollendo	Arequipa	Municipal de Mollendo
Saetas de Oro	La Joya	Arequipa	Municipal de La Joya
Social Corire	Castilla	Arequipa	Mariano Melgar
Sport Boys	Mollendo	Arequipa	Municipal de Mollendo
Sport José Granda	Camaná	Arequipa	9 de Noviembre
Sportivo Huracán	Arequipa	Arequipa	Mariano Melgar
Unión Minas de Orcopampa	Orcopampa	Arequipa	Municipal de Orcopampa
Unión Salaverry	Uchumayo	Arequipa	Municipal de Uchumayo
White Star	Arequipa	Arequipa	Mariano Melgar

=== Liga Departamental de Ayacucho ===
Club	City	Region	Stadium
Cultural Huracán	Huanta	Ayacucho	Manuel Eloy Molina Robles
Deportivo Municipal (Huamanga)	Ayacucho	Ayacucho	Ciudad de Cumaná
Froebel Deportes	Ayacucho	Ayacucho	Ciudad de Cumaná
Player Villafuerte	Ayacucho	Ayacucho	Ciudad de Cumaná
Sport Huamanga	Ayacucho	Ayacucho	Ciudad de Cumaná
Sport Huanta	Huanta	Ayacucho	Manuel Eloy Molina Robles

=== Liga Departamental de Cajamarca ===
Club	City	Region	Stadium
Atlético Chalaco	Chota	Cajamarca	Municipal de Chota
Atlético Chota	Chota	Cajamarca	Municipal de Chota
Comerciantes	Chota	Cajamarca	Municipal de Chota
Cultural Chota	Chota	Cajamarca	Municipal de Chota
Deportivo Chota	Chota	Cajamarca	Municipal de Chota
Deportivo Hualgayoc	Hualgayoc	Cajamarca	José Gálvez Egúsquiza
Deportivo Ingeniería	Cajamarca	Cajamarca	Héroes de San Ramón
Deportivo Punre	Cajamarca	Cajamarca	Héroes de San Ramón
Deportivo San Ramón	Cajamarca	Cajamarca	Héroes de San Ramón
Escuela Normal	Chota	Cajamarca	Municipal de Chota
Estrellas Rojas	Chota	Cajamarca	Municipal de Chota
FC Sainthore	Cajamarca	Cajamarca	Héroes de San Ramón
Horacio Pereyra Salas	Chota	Cajamarca	Municipal de Chota
Juvenil San Ramón	Cajamarca	Cajamarca	Héroes de San Ramón
Juvenil UTC	Cajamarca	Cajamarca	Héroes de San Ramón
Las Palmas	Chota	Cajamarca	Municipal de Chota
Martín Coba	Cajamarca	Cajamarca	Héroes de San Ramón
Sport Ancos	Cajamarca	Cajamarca	Héroes de San Ramón
UNC	Cajamarca	Cajamarca	Héroes de San Ramón
William Prescot	Cajamarca	Cajamarca	Héroes de San Ramón

=== Liga Departamental del Callao ===
Club	City	Region	Stadium
ADO	Callao	Callao	Miguel Grau
Atlético Barrio Frigorífico	Callao	Callao	Miguel Grau
Atlético Chalaco	Callao	Callao	Miguel Grau
Atlético Pilsen Callao	Callao	Callao	Miguel Grau
Deportivo SIMA	Callao	Callao	Miguel Grau
Estrella Azul	Ventanilla	Callao	Miguel Grau
Hijos de Yurimaguas	Callao	Callao	Miguel Grau
KDT Nacional	Callao	Callao	Miguel Grau
Somos Aduanas	Callao	Callao	Miguel Grau

=== Liga Departamental del Cusco ===
Club	City	Region	Stadium
AJI	Calca	Cusco	Thomas E. Payne
Alfredo Salinas	Espinar	Cusco	Municipal de Espinar
Alianza Espinar	Espinar	Cusco	Municipal de Espinar
Cienciano Junior	Cusco	Cusco	Garcilaso
Corazón de León	Cusco	Cusco	Garcilaso
Defensor Cubillas	Espinar	Cusco	Municipal de Espinar
Deportivo Municipal	Espinar	Cusco	Municipal de Espinar
Deportivo Tintaya	Cusco	Cusco	Garcilaso
Espinar City	Espinar	Cusco	Municipal de Espinar
Estudiantes Agropecuario	Calca	Cusco	Thomas E. Payne
Humberto Luna	Calca	Cusco	Thomas E. Payne
Ingeniería Eléctrica	Cusco	Cusco	Garcilaso
Ingeniería Civil	Cusco	Cusco	Garcilaso
Inti Qosqo	Cusco	Cusco	Garcilaso
Salesianos	Cusco	Cusco	Garcilaso
San Francisco de Asis	Cusco	Cusco	Garcilaso
Tintaya Marquiri	Espinar	Cusco	Municipal de Espinar
Universitario	Cusco	Cusco	Garcilaso
UNSAAC	Cusco	Cusco	Garcilaso

=== Liga Departamental de Huancavelica ===
Club	City	Region	Stadium
Cultural Bolognesi	Huancavelica	Huancavelica	IPD de Huancavelica
Deportivo Caminos	Huancavelica	Huancavelica	IPD de Huancavelica
Diablos Rojos	Huancavelica	Huancavelica	IPD de Huancavelica
Estrella Roja	Huancavelica	Huancavelica	IPD de Huancavelica
FC Huayrapata	Angaraes	Huancavelica	Alberto Vargas de Lircay
Instituto Pedagógico	Huancavelica	Huancavelica	IPD de Huancavelica
Racing FBC	Huancavelica	Huancavelica	IPD de Huancavelica
Real Santa Bárbara	Huancavelica	Huancavelica	IPD de Huancavelica
RUSA	Huancavelica	Huancavelica	IPD de Huancavelica
Santa Rosa	Huancavelica	Huancavelica	IPD de Huancavelica
Social Lircay	Angaraes	Huancavelica	Alberto Vargas de Lircay
Sol de Oro	Huancavelica	Huancavelica	IPD de Huancavelica
Sport Azafrán	Angaraes	Huancavelica	Alberto Vargas de Lircay
Sport Paulita	Huancavelica	Huancavelica	IPD de Huancavelica
UD Calvario	Huancavelica	Huancavelica	IPD de Huancavelica
UDH	Huancavelica	Huancavelica	IPD de Huancavelica
Unión Santa Bárbara	Huancavelica	Huancavelica	IPD de Huancavelica

=== Liga Departamental de Huánuco ===
Club	City	Region	Stadium
León de Huánuco	Huánuco	Huánuco	Heraclio Tapia
Mariano Santos	Tingo María	Huánuco	IDP de Tingo María

=== Liga Departamental de Ica ===
Club	City	Region	Stadium
Alianza Pisco	Pisco	Ica	Teobaldo Pinillos Olaechea
Defensor Zarumilla	Nasca	Ica	12 de Noviembre
Octavio Espinosa	Ica	Ica	José Picasso Peratta
Olímpico Peruano	Ica	Ica	José Picasso Peratta
Sport Victoria	Ica	Ica	José Picasso Peratta
Unión San Martín	Pisco	Ica	Teobaldo Pinillos Olaechea

=== Liga Departamental de Junín ===
Club	City	Region	Stadium
Alipio Ponce	Mazamari	Junín	Municipal de Mazamari
Deportivo Ingeniería	Huancayo	Junín	Huancayo
Deportivo Junín	Huancayo	Junín	Huancayo
Sport Águila	Huancayo	Junín	Huancayo
Sport Dos de Mayo	Tarma	Junín	Unión Tarma

=== Liga Departamental de La Libertad ===
Club	City	Region	Stadium
Alfonso Ugarte de Chiclín	Trujillo	La Libertad	Mansiche
Atlético Medellín	Trujillo	La Libertad	Mansiche
Carlos M. Orbegoso	Trujillo	La Libertad	Mansiche
Carlos Tenaud	Trujillo	La Libertad	Mansiche
Coopsol Trujillo	Trujillo	La Libertad	Mansiche
Defensor Porvenir	Trujillo	La Libertad	Mansiche
El Inca	Virú	La Libertad	Carlos Wiese
Los Espartanos	Pacasmayo	La Libertad	Carlos A. Olivares
Racing	Huamachuco	La Libertad	Municipal de Huamachuco
Sport Chavelines	Pacasmayo	La Libertad	Carlos A. Olivares
Training Gol	Trujillo	La Libertad	Mansiche
Universitario de Trujillo	Trujillo	La Libertad	Mansiche
Universitario UPAO	Trujillo	La Libertad	Mansiche
UNT	Trujillo	La Libertad	Mansiche

=== Liga Departamental de Lambayeque ===
Club	City	Region	Stadium
Boca Juniors	Chiclayo	Lambayeque	Elías Aguirre
Deportivo Cañaña	Chiclayo	Lambayeque	Elías Aguirre
Deportivo Pomalca	Pomalca	Lambayeque	La Bombonera
Los Caimanes	Chiclayo	Lambayeque	Elías Aguirre
San Lorenzo	Chiclayo	Lambayeque	Elías Aguirre
Sport José Pardo	Tumán	Lambayeque	Eugenio Zapata Mingoya

=== Liga Departamental de Lima ===
Club	City	Region	Stadium
AELU	Pueblo Libre	Lima	La Unión
Atlético Minero	Matucana	Lima	Municipal de Matucana
Aurora Chancayllo	Huaral	Lima	Julio Lores Colan
Aurora Miraflores	Miraflores	Lima	Manuel Bonilla
Bella Esperanza	Cerro Azul	Lima	Municipal de Cerro Azul
Ciclista Lima	Lima	Municipal de Chorrillos	
Circolo Sportivo Italiano	San Isidro	Lima	Complejo Deportivo Municipal
Defensor Laure Sur	Chancay	Lima	Rómulo Shaw Cisneros
Defensor Lima	Breña	Lima	GUE Mariano Melgar
Defensor Villa del Mar	Villa El Salvador	Lima	
DIM	Miraflores	Lima	Manuel Bonilla
Géminis	Comas	Lima	Daniel Hernani
Guardia Republicana	La Molina	Lima	
Independiente	Cañete	Lima	Roberto Yañez
Juventud Barranco	Huacho	Lima	Segundo Aranda Torres
Juventud La Joya	Chancay	Lima	Rómulo Shaw Cisneros
Juventud La Palma	Huacho	Lima	Segundo Aranda Torres
Juventud La Rural	Surco	Lima	
Lima Cricket	San Isidro	Lima	Complejo Deportivo Municipal
Mariscal Sucre	La Victoria	Lima	GUE Pedro Labarthe
Pedro Anselmo Bazalar	Huacho	Lima	Segundo Aranda Torres
Real Independiente	Huaura	Lima	Marcial Villanueva Marcos
Regatas Lima	San Isidro	Lima	Complejo Deportivo Municipal
San Agustín	Lince	Lima	Colegio Melitón Carbajal
San Simón	Magdalena	Lima	Campo Deportivo Depor Center
Santiago Barranco	Barranco	Lima	Unión de Barranco
Unión Supe	Supe	Lima	Edgardo Reyes Bolívar
Universidad San Marcos	Lima	Lima	San Marcos
Venus	Huaura	Lima	Segundo Aranda Torres
Walter Ormeño	Cañete	Lima	Roberto Yañez

=== Liga Departamental de Loreto ===
Club	City	Region	Stadium
Chacarita Versalles	Iquitos	Loreto	Max Augustín
CNI	Iquitos	Loreto	Max Augustín
Hungaritos Agustinos	Iquitos	Loreto	Max Augustín
UNAP	Iquitos	Loreto	Max Augustín

=== Liga Departamental de Madre de Dios ===
Club	City	Region	Stadium
30 de Agosto	Puerto Maldonado	Madre de Dios	IPD de Puerto Maldonado
AFC Caychihue	Huepetuche	Madre de Dios	Municipal de Huepetuche
Ángeles de la Biodiversidad	Puerto Maldonado	Madre de Dios	IPD de Puerto Maldonado
Atlético Iberia	Iberia	Madre de Dios	Municipal de Tahuamanu
Atlético Talleres	Puerto Maldonado	Madre de Dios	IPD de Puerto Maldonado
Deportivo Maldonado	Puerto Maldonado	Madre de Dios	IPD de Puerto Maldonado
Deportivo Monterrico	Tahuamanu	Madre de Dios	Municipal de Tahuamanu
Fray Martín de Porres	Puerto Maldonado	Madre de Dios	IPD de Puerto Maldonado
Hospital Santa Rosa	Puerto Maldonado	Madre de Dios	IPD de Puerto Maldonado
La Masía Nace	Huepetuche	Madre de Dios	Municipal de Huepetuche
MINSA	Puerto Maldonado	Madre de Dios	IPD de Puerto Maldonado
Real Atlético Nueva	Huepetuche	Madre de Dios	Municipal de Huepetuche
Real Sudamericano	Puerto Maldonado	Madre de Dios	IPD de Puerto Maldonado
Sport Agropecuario	Puerto Maldonado	Madre de Dios	IPD de Puerto Maldonado
Unión Empresas	Inambari	Madre de Dios	IPD de Puerto Maldonado

=== Liga Departamental de Moquegua ===
Club	City	Region	Stadium
Academia Ticsani	Moquegua	Moquegua	25 de Noviembre
ADEBA	Moquegua	Moquegua	25 de Noviembre
Atlético Huracán	Moquegua	Moquegua	25 de Noviembre
Credicoop San Cristóbal	Ilo	Moquegua	Mariscal Nieto
Deportivo Enersur	Ilo	Moquegua	Mariscal Nieto
Hijos del Altiplano y del Pacífico	Ilo	Moquegua	Mariscal Nieto
Mariscal Nieto	Ilo	Moquegua	Mariscal Nieto
Peñarol	Ilo	Moquegua	Mariscal Nieto
Social Chalaca	Ilo	Moquegua	Mariscal Nieto
Social EPISA	Ilo	Moquegua	Mariscal Nieto

=== Liga Departamental de Pasco ===
Club	City	Region	Stadium
AD Rio Azi Pizu	Oxapampa	Pasco	Municipal de Oxapampa
Columna Pasco	Daniel Alcides Carrión	Pasco	Coloso de Yanacancha
Defensor Constitución	Oxapampa	Pasco	Municipal de Oxapampa
Juventud Ticlacayán	Cerro de Pasco	Pasco	Daniel Alcides Carrión
Real Santiago Allauca	Daniel Alcides Carrión	Pasco	Coloso de Yanacancha
San Juan de Michivilca	Daniel Alcides Carrión	Pasco	Coloso de Yanacancha
Santa Ana	Daniel Alcides Carrión	Pasco	Coloso de Yanacancha
Sociedad Tiro 28	Cerro de Pasco	Pasco	Daniel Alcides Carrión
Unión Chinche	Daniel Alcides Carrión	Pasco	Coloso de Yanacancha
Unión Chontabamba	Oxapampa	Pasco	Municipal de Oxapampa
Unión Fuerza Minera	Cerro de Pasco	Pasco	Daniel Alcides Carrión
Unión Minas	Cerro de Pasco	Pasco	Daniel Alcides Carrión
Zona Industrial	Oxapampa	Pasco	Municipal de Oxapampa

=== Liga Departamental de Piura ===
Club	City	Region	Stadium
Atlético Torino	Talara	Piura	Campeonísimo
Defensor La Bocana	Sechura	Piura	Sesquicentenario
Olimpia	La Unión	Piura	Municipal de La Unión
Sport Chorrillos	Talara	Piura	Campeonísimo
Sport Estrella	Paita	Piura	Revolución de Pueblo Nuevo
UDP	Sechura	Piura	Sesquicentenario

=== Liga Departamental de Puno ===
Club	City	Region	Stadium
ADEVIL	Juliaca	Puno	Guillermo Briceño Rosamedina
Alfonso Ugarte	Puno	Puno	Guillermo Briceño Rosamedina
American Blanquiazul	Juliaca	Puno	Guillermo Briceño Rosamedina
Atlético Nacional	Juliaca	Puno	Guillermo Briceño Rosamedina
Atlético Politécnico	Juliaca	Puno	Guillermo Briceño Rosamedina
CEFUT Juliaca	Juliaca	Puno	Guillermo Briceño Rosamedina
DAC Cerro Colorado	Juliaca	Puno	Guillermo Briceño Rosamedina
Deportivo ANBA	Juliaca	Puno	Guillermo Briceño Rosamedina
Deportivo Enciniano	Juliaca	Puno	Guillermo Briceño Rosamedina
Deportivo San Román	Juliaca	Puno	Guillermo Briceño Rosamedina
Internacional Upa Upa	Juliaca	Puno	Guillermo Briceño Rosamedina
Juventud Unida	Juliaca	Puno	Guillermo Briceño Rosamedina
Unión Fuerza Minera	Putina	Puno	Municipal de Putina
Universitario Región Sur	Juliaca	Puno	Guillermo Briceño Rosamedina
Upa Upa Junior	Juliaca	Puno	Guillermo Briceño Rosamedina

=== Liga Departamental de San Martín ===
Club	City	Region	Stadium
AD Tahuishco	Moyobamba	San Martín	IPD de Moyobamba
Atlético Belén	Moyobamba	San Martín	IPD de Moyobamba
Cultural Juanjuí	Juanjuí	San Martín	Gran Paiján
Deportivo Cali	Tarapoto	San Martín	Carlos Vidaurre García
Deportivo Comercio	Juanjuí	San Martín	Gran Pajatén
Sargento Lores	Moyobamba	San Martín	IPD de Moyobamba
Unión Tarapoto	Tarapoto	San Martín	Carlos Vidaurre García

=== Liga Departamental de Tacna ===
Club	City	Region	Stadium
Alfonso Ugarte de Tacna	Tacna	Tacna	Jorge Basadre
Coronel Bolognesi	Tacna	Tacna	Jorge Basadre
Defensor Tacna	Tacna	Tacna	Jorge Basadre
Defensor UNTAC	Tacna	Tacna	Jorge Basadre
Deportivo Municipal	Tacna	Tacna	Jorge Basadre
Mariscal Miller	Tacna	Tacna	Jorge Basadre
Quillabamba Junior	Tacna	Tacna	Jorge Basadre
Unión Alfonso Ugarte	Tacna	Tacna	Jorge Basadre
Unión Mirave	Jorge Basadre	Tacna	Jorge Pinto Liendo
Virgen de la Natividad	Jorge Basadre	Tacna	Jorge Pinto Liendo

=== Liga Departamental de Tumbes ===
Club	City	Region	Stadium
Academia Amerindia	Zarumilla	Tumbes	24 de Julio
Asociación Los Chanos	Zarumilla	Tumbes	24 de Julio
Atlético Las Malvinas	Tumbes	Tumbes	Mariscal Cáceres
Carlos Concha	Tumbes	Tumbes	Mariscal Cáceres
Comercial Aguas Verdes	Zarumilla	Tumbes	24 de Julio
Cristal Tumbes	Tumbes	Tumbes	Mariscal Cáceres
Defensor Diego de Almagro	Tumbes	Tumbes	Mariscal Cáceres
Defensor El Progreso	Tumbes	Tumbes	Mariscal Cáceres
Defensor Las Mercedes	Tumbes	Tumbes	Mariscal Cáceres
Defensor San José	Tumbes	Tumbes	Mariscal Cáceres
Deportivo Pacífico	Tumbes	Tumbes	Mariscal Cáceres
Eduardo Ávalos Bustamante	Tumbes	Tumbes	Mariscal Cáceres
Ferrocarril	Zarumilla	Tumbes	24 de Julio
Halcones del Norte	Zarumilla	Tumbes	24 de Julio
Inca Junior's	Tumbes	Tumbes	Mariscal Cáceres
Independiente Aguas Verdes	Zarumilla	Tumbes	24 de Julio
José Abelardo Quiñones	Zarumilla	Tumbes	24 de Julio
José Chiroque Cielo	Zarumilla	Tumbes	24 de Julio
Juventud 6 de Diciembre	Zarumilla	Tumbes	24 de Julio
Leoncio Prado	Pampas de Hospital	Tumbes	Andres Feijóo Zárate
Miñano Junior	Zarumilla	Tumbes	24 de Julio
Nueva Juventud	Zarumilla	Tumbes	24 de Julio
Renovación Pacífico	Tumbes	Tumbes	Mariscal Cáceres
Sport El Edén	Tumbes	Tumbes	Mariscal Cáceres
Sport Miraflores	Zarumilla	Tumbes	24 de Julio
Sport Pampas	Tumbes	Tumbes	Mariscal Cáceres
Sport Unión	Zarumilla	Tumbes	24 de Julio
Sport Zarumilla	Zarumilla	Tumbes	24 de Julio
Sporting Pizarro	Tumbes	Tumbes	Mariscal Cáceres
Unión Pacífico	Tumbes	Tumbes	Mariscal Cáceres
Walter Jool Solano	Tumbes	Tumbes	Mariscal Cáceres

=== Liga Departamental de Ucayali ===
Club	City	Region	Stadium
Atlético Raymondi	Atalaya	Ucayali	Aliardo Soria Pérez
Barrios Unidos	Pucallpa	Ucayali	Aliardo Soria Pérez
Cocaleros	Padre Abad	Ucayali	Aliardo Soria Pérez
Colegio Comercio	Pucallpa	Ucayali	Aliardo Soria Pérez
Defensor Municipal (Aguaytía)	Aguaytía	Ucayali	Municipal de Aguaytia
Defensor San Alejandro	Aguaytía	Ucayali	Municipal de Aguaytia
Deportivo Bancos	Pucallpa	Ucayali	Aliardo Soria Pérez
Deportivo Hospital	Pucallpa	Ucayali	Aliardo Soria Pérez
Deportivo Pucallpa	Pucallpa	Ucayali	Aliardo Soria Pérez
Deportivo Shambillo	Padre Abad	Ucayali	Aliardo Soria Pérez
Deportivo Siloe	Pucallpa	Ucayali	Aliardo Soria Pérez
Escuela Municipal de Tournavista	Tournavista	Ucayali	Aliardo Soria Pérez
Huracán (Puerto Inca)	Puerto Inca	Ucayali	Aliardo Soria Pérez
Inter FC Manantay	Manantay	Ucayali	Aliardo Soria Pérez
La Loretana	Pucallpa	Ucayali	Aliardo Soria Pérez
Miguel Grau (Atalaya)	Atalaya	Ucayali	Aliardo Soria Pérez
Nuevo Pucallpa	Pucallpa	Ucayali	Aliardo Soria Pérez
Real Von Humboldt	Padre Abad	Ucayali	Aliardo Soria Pérez
San Antonio de Padua	Atalaya	Ucayali	Aliardo Soria Pérez
San Martín de Porres	Pucallpa	Ucayali	Aliardo Soria Pérez
Sao Paulo	Pucallpa	Ucayali	Aliardo Soria Pérez
Sport Loreto	Pucallpa	Ucayali	Aliardo Soria Pérez
Sporting Cristal (Padre Abad)	Padre Abad	Ucayali	Aliardo Soria Pérez
Tecnológico	Pucallpa	Ucayali	Aliardo Soria Pérez
UNU	Pucallpa	Ucayali	Aliardo Soria Pérez

== Defunct and inactive ==
Club	City	Region	Stadium
15 de Setiembre	Trujillo	La Libertad	Mansiche
Alianza Cristiana	Iquitos	Loreto	Max Augustín
Alianza Unicachi	Puno	Puno	Enrique Torres Bellon
Carlos Concha	Callao	Callao	Miguel Grau
Centro Iqueño	Rímac	Lima	Colegio Ricardo Bentín
Chanchamayo / Hostal Rey	Huancayo	Junín	Huancayo
Cobresol	Moquegua	Moquegua	25 de Noviembre
Defensor ANDA	Aucayacu	Huánuco	Municipal de Aucayacu
Defensor Arica	Breña	Lima	Colegio Mariano Melgar
Estudiantes de Medicina	Ica	Ica	José Picasso Peratta
Franciscano San Román	Juliaca	Puno	Guillermo Briceño Rosamedina
Hijos de Acosvinchos	Ate	Lima	Colegio San Alfonso
IDUNSA	Arequipa	Arequipa	Mariano Melgar
I.M.I.	Talara	Piura	Campeonísimo
Internationale	San Borja	Lima	Polideportivo de Limatambo
Juvenil Los Ángeles	Moquegua	Moquegua	25 de Noviembre
Libertad	Trujillo	La Libertad	Mansiche
Mina San Vicente	Huancayo	Junín	Huancayo
Morba	Trujillo	La Libertad	Mansiche
Porvenir Miraflores	Miraflores	Lima	Manuel Bonilla
Senati	Arequipa	Arequipa	Mariano Melgar
Serrato Pacasmayo / Willy Serrato	Pacasmayo	La Libertad	
Sport Pilsen	Guadalupe	La Libertad	Carlos A. Olivares
Sporting Tabaco	Rímac	Lima	
Total Clean / Total Chalaco	Arequipa	Arequipa	Mariano Melgar
Unión Carolina	Puno	Puno	
Unión Huayllaspanca	Huancayo	Junín	Huancayo
Unión Ocopilla	Huancayo	Junín	Huancayo

== See also ==
- CONMEBOL
