= List of football stadiums in Peru =

The following is a list of football stadiums in Peru, ordered by capacity. The stadiums with a capacity of at least 5,000 are ranked in order of capacity. The 14,000-capacity Plaza de toros de Acho is the largest non-football stadium in Peru by capacity.

== Current stadiums ==
#	Image	Stadium	Capacity	City	Home team(s)	Opened
1		Estadio Monumental "U"	80,093	Lima	Universitario	2000
2		Estadio Nacional	50,086	Lima	Peru	1952
3		Estadio Garcilaso	45,056	Cusco	Cienciano; Cusco FC; Deportivo Garcilaso	1950
4		Estadio Monumental de la UNSA	40,370	Arequipa	Melgar	1995
5		Estadio Alejandro Villanueva	33,938	Lima	Alianza Lima	1974
6		Estadio Universidad San Marcos	32,000	Lima	Universidad San Marcos	1951
7		Estadio Manuel Rivera Sanchez	32,000	Chimbote	José Gálvez	2007
8		Estadio Monumental de la UNA	30,000	Puno	Alfonso Ugarte de Puno	2022
9		Estadio Miguel Grau de Piura	25,500	Piura	Atletico Grau	1958
10		Estadio Mansiche	25,036	Trujillo	Carlos A. Mannucci; Universidad César Vallejo	1946
11		Estadio Heraclio Tapia	25,000	Huánuco	Alianza Universidad; Construcción Civil; León de Huánuco	1972
12		Estadio Official de Pucallpa	25,000	Pucallpa	Rauker FC; Sport Loreto	1997
13		Estadio Max Augustín	24,576	Iquitos	CNI; Comerciantes FC	1942
14		Estadio Elías Aguirre	24,500	Chiclayo	Juan Aurich	1970
15		Estadio 25 de Noviembre	21,000	Moquegua	Atlético Huracán; Deportivo Moquegua; FCR San Antonio	2009
16		Estadio Joel Gutiérrez	21,000	Tacna	Alfonso Ugarte de Tacna	1995
17		Estadio Guillermo Briceño Rosamedina	20,030	Juliaca	Deportivo Binacional	1966
18		Estadio Huancayo	20,000	Huancayo	Sport Huancayo	1962
19		Estadio Mariano Melgar	20,000	Arequipa	Aurora; Melgar; Piérola; Sportivo Huracán	1954
20		Estadio E. Torres Belón	20,000	Puno	Alfonso Ugarte de Puno	1963
21		Estadio Jorge Basadre	19,850	Tacna	Bentín Tacna Heroica; Coronel Bolognesi; Patriotas	1954
22		Estadio Héroes de San Ramón	18,465	Cajamarca	FC Cajamarca; UTC	1942
23		Estadio Rosas Pampa	18,000	Huaraz	San Marcos; Sport Áncash	1944
24		Estadio Alberto Gallardo	18,000	Lima	Sporting Cristal; Universidad San Martín	1961
25		Estadio Miguel Grau	17,785	Callao	Academia Deportiva Cantolao; Sport Boys	1996
26		Estadio Tupac Amaru	15,230	Cusco		2011
27		Estadio José Picasso Peratta	15,000	Ica	Estudiantes de Medicina; Octavio Espinoza	2009
28		Estadio IPD de Moyobamba	15,000	Moyobamba	Atlético Belén	
29		Estadio Félix Castillo Tardío	14,000	Chincha Alta		2024
30		Estadio Iván Elías Moreno	13,773	Lima	Deportivo Municipal	
31		Estadio Campeones del 36	12,000	Sullana	Alianza Atlético	2014
32		Estadio Juan Maldonado Gamarra	12,000	Cutervo	Comerciantes Unidos	1961 (2014 professionally)
33		Estadio Daniel Alcides Carrión	12,000	Cerro de Pasco	Ecosem Pasco; Unión Minas	1986
34		Estadio Mariscal Cáceres	12,000	Tumbes	Sport Bolognesi	
35		Estadio Municipal de Espinar	12,000	Espinar	Alfredo Salinas	2010
36		Estadio Los Chankas	10,000	Andahuaylas	Los Chankas	2013
37		Estadio Municipal de Nasca	10,000	Ica	Santos	2013
38		Estadio Monumental de Condebamba	10,000	Abancay	Deportivo Educación	2003
39		Estadio Andres Bedoya Diaz	10,000	Lima	Fútbol Club Killas	2021
40		Estadio Unión Tarma	9,100	Tarma	ADT	1980
41		Estadio Segundo Aranda Torres	9,000	Huacho	Juventud Barranco; Juventud La Palma	2010
42		Estadio Víctor Montoya Segura	9,000	Jaén	ADA	1962
43		Estadio Campeonísimo	8,000	Talara	Atlético Torino	1977
44		Estadio Carlos Vidaurre García	7,000	Tarapoto	Unión Comercio; Unión Tarapoto	
45		Estadio César Flores Marigorda	7,000	Lambayeque	FC Carlos Stein; Deportivo Lute	
46		Estadio Sesquicentenario	7,000	Sechura	Defensor La Bocana	1966
47		Estadio Municipal de Bernal	7,000	Piura		2015
48		Estadio Atlético de la Villa Deportiva Nacional	6,800	Lima	Villa Deportiva Nacional	2019
49		Estadio Julio Lores Colán	6,000	Huaral	Unión Huaral	1952
50		Estadio Teodoro Lolo Fernández	6,000	Lima	Universitario	1952
51		Estadio Chan Chan	5,500	Trujillo	Alfonso Ugarte de Chiclín	2013
52		Estadio IPD de Huancavelica	5,400	Huancavelica	Diablos Rojos; UDA	2017
53		Manuel Bonilla Sports Complex	5,000	Lima	Aurora Miraflores	1995
54		Estadio Municipal de Mollendo	5,000	Mollendo	Nacional FBC	
55		Estadio Telmo Carbajo	5,000	Callao	Atlético Chalaco	1927

== See also ==
- Football in Peru
- List of South American stadiums by capacity
- List of association football stadiums by capacity
- List of association football stadiums by country
- List of sports venues by capacity
- List of stadiums by capacity
- Lists of stadiums
