= 2011 Copa del Inca =

2011 Torneo Intermedio
Tournament details
- Country: Peru
- Dates: 14 May 2011 – 30 July 2011
- Teams: 35

Final positions
- Champions: José Gálvez
- Runners-up: Sport Áncash

Tournament statistics
- Matches played: 49
- Goals scored: 112 (2.29 per match)

The 2011 Copa del Inca (also known as the Torneo Intermedio) was played between June and July while the Peru national football team prepared for and competed in the 2011 Copa América. The tournament was played as a knockout competition, with the participation of the 16 teams of the Primera División, and 19 invited teams of which 5 compete in the Segunda División and 14 amateur teams. The winners, José Gálvez, disputed the 2012 Copa Federación against the 2011 Torneo Descentralizado champion, Juan Aurich.

== Teams ==
Locations of the 2011 Torneo Intermedio teams

Team	City	Stadium	Capacity
Primera División
Alianza Atlético	Sullana	Campeones del 36	8,000
Alianza Lima	Lima	Alejandro Villanueva	35,000
Cienciano	Cusco	Garcilaso	40,000
Cobresol	Moquegua	25 de Noviembre	25,000
CNI	Iquitos	Max Augustín	24,000
Inti Gas	Ayacucho	Ciudad de Cumaná	15,000
Juan Aurich	Chiclayo	Elías Aguirre	24,500
León de Huánuco	Huánuco	Heraclio Tapia	15,000
Melgar	Arequipa	Virgen de Chapi	40,217
Sport Boys	Callao	Miguel Grau	17,000
Sport Huancayo	Huancayo	Huancayo	20,000
Sporting Cristal	Lima	San Martín de Porres	18,000
Unión Comercio	Nueva Cajamarca	IPD de Moyobamba	8,000
Universidad César Vallejo	Trujillo	Mansiche	25,000
Universidad San Martín	Lima	San Martín de Porres	18,000
Universitario	Lima	Monumental	80,093
Segunda División
Alianza Unicachi	Puno	Enrique Torres Belón	20,000
Atlético Torino	Talara	Campeonísimo	8,000
Coronel Bolognesi	Tacna	Jorge Basadre	19,850
José Gálvez	Chimbote	Manuel Rivera Sánchez	25,000
Sport Áncash	Huaraz	Rosas Pampa	18,000
Amateur
Alfonso Ugarte	Puno	Enrique Torres Belón	20,000
ADT	Tarma	Unión Tarma	9,000
Atlético Grau	Piura	Miguel Grau	25,000
Aurora	Arequipa	Mariano Melgar	20,000
Deportivo Garcilaso	Cusco	Garcilaso	40,000
Deportivo Municipal	Lima	Miguel Grau	17,000
José María Arguedas	Andahuaylas	Los Chankas	10,000
Pedro Anselmo Bazalar	Huacho	Segundo Aranda Torres	12,000
Real Garcilaso	Cusco	Garcilaso	40,000
Sport Victoria	Ica	José Picasso Peratta	8,000
Sporting Pizarro	Tumbes	Mariscal Cáceres	12,000
Sportivo Huracán	Arequipa	Mariano Melgar	20,000
Unión Huaral	Huaral	Julio Lores Colán	10,000
UTC	Cajamarca	Héroes de San Ramón	18,000

== Preliminary round ==
All kick-off times are local (UTC−05:00).

14 May 2011	Aurora	1–2	Sportivo Huracán	Estadio Monumental Virgen de Chapi, Arequipa
15:00	Marco Roldán 90+2'	Report	Édgar Romaní 56' 57'	Referee: Luis Garay

15 May 2011	Deportivo Garcilaso	0–1	Real Garcilaso	Estadio Garcilaso, Cusco
15:00		Report	Miguel Reyna 2'	Referee: Alberto Lozano

18 May 2011	Alfonso Ugarte	1–1 (4–5 p)	Alianza Unicachi	Estadio Enrique Torres Belón, Puno
15:00	Jorge Zambrano 9'	Report	Yorkman Tello 86'	Referee: Héctor Rojas
	Penalties
	Paolo Núñez (penalty missed); Jorge Zambrano (penalty scored); Dante Flores (penalty scored); Hans Paiva (penalty scored); Luis Pineda (penalty scored)		(penalty scored) Pedro Sanguinetti; (penalty scored) Alberto Monserrate; (penalty scored) Atilio Francia; (penalty scored) Luis Galliquio; (penalty scored) Robert Ardiles

== First round ==
All kick-off times are local (UTC−05:00).

28 May 2011	Deportivo Municipal	0–0 (4–2 p)	Sport Boys	Estadio San Martín de Porres, Lima
13:45		Report		Referee: Héctor Rojas
	Penalties
	Carlos García (penalty scored); Rudy Maraví (penalty scored); Lorenzo Ventura (penalty scored); Alexander Castillo (penalty scored)		(penalty scored) Clifford Seminario; (penalty scored) Juan Arce; (penalty missed) Joseph Muñoz; (penalty missed) Héctor Santos

28 May 2011	Atlético Grau	1–0	Alianza Atlético	Estadio Miguel Grau, Piura
16:00	Andy Barrueto 59'	Report		Referee: Alberto Lozano

28 May 2011	José Gálvez	1–1 (4–2 p)	Alianza Lima	Estadio Manuel Rivera Sánchez, Chimbote
18:15	Victor Oviedo 82'	Report	Carlos Gonzales 45+1'	Referee: Fredy Arellanos
	Penalties
	Luis Mayme (penalty scored); César Medina (penalty scored); Johnny Obeso (penalty missed); Cosme Garcete (penalty scored); Marco Flores (penalty scored)		(penalty missed) Miguel Curiel; (penalty scored) José Mesarina; (penalty missed) Carlos Beltrán; (penalty scored) Carlos Ascues

28 May 2011	Sport Áncash	3–2	Universitario	Estadio Rosas Pampa, Huaraz
20:30	Éiner Vásquez 8'; Lionel Alguedas 22'; Fabricio Lenci 63'	Report	Aurelio Saco Vértiz 53'; José Mendoza 70'	Referee: Iván Chang

29 May 2011	UTC	1–1 (4–2 p)	León de Huánuco	Estadio Héroes de San Ramón, Cajamarca
12:00	Ángel Guerrero 2'	Report	Roller Cambindo 21'	Referee: Julio Álvarez
	Penalties
	Ángel Guerrero (penalty scored); Paolo Joya (penalty scored); Michael Caján (penalty scored); Raul Alemán (penalty scored)		(penalty scored) Juan Diego González Vigil; (penalty scored) Guillermo Salas; (penalty missed) Roller Cambindo; (penalty missed) Jair Céspedes

29 May 2011	Atlético Torino	0–0 (2–4 p)	Juan Aurich	Estadio Campeonísimo, Talara
13:00		Report		Referee: Fernando Legario
	Penalties
	Manuel Marengo (penalty missed); Charles Quinto (penalty scored); John Tapia (penalty missed); Yoshi Shimokawa (penalty scored)		(penalty missed) Fernando García; (penalty scored) Jersson Vásquez; (penalty scored) Romario Aliaga; (penalty scored) Mario Velarde; (penalty scored) Ignacio Drago

29 May 2011	Real Garcilaso	3–1	Cienciano	Estadio Garcilaso, Cusco
13:30	Jaime Huerta 54'; Giancarlo Chichizola 61'; Paul Rodríguez 82'	Report	Jimmy Flores 52'	Referee: Alejandro Villanueva

29 May 2011	ADT	1–1 (1–4 p)	Sport Huancayo	Estadio Unión Tarma, Tarma
15:00	Carlos Tinoco 15'	Report	Christian Pabón 64'	Referee: Robert Rafael
	Penalties
	Juan Cahuas (penalty missed); Rubén Almanza (penalty missed); Javier Ortiz (penalty scored)		(penalty scored) Mario Angulo; (penalty scored) Deyair Reyes; (penalty scored) Saúl Giral; (penalty scored) Marcos Delgado

29 May 2011	Coronel Bolognesi	0–1	Sporting Cristal	Estadio Jorge Basadre, Tacna
15:00		Report	Andy Pando 83'	Referee: Roberto Mauro

29 May 2011	José María Arguedas	1–0	Inti Gas	Estadio Los Chankas, Andahuaylas
15:00	Christian Sánchez 45+1'	Report		Referee: Jesús Vásquez

29 May 2011	Pedro Anselmo Bazalar	0–1	Universidad César Vallejo	Estadio Segundo Aranda Torres, Huacho
15:00		Report	Víctor Rossel 14'	Referee: Luis Garay

29 May 2011	Sporting Pizarro	2–1	Unión Comercio	Estadio Mariscal Cáceres, Tumbes
15:00	Luis Plaza 55'; Hoover Crespo 63'	Report	Luis Laguna 28'	Referee: Federico Sosa

29 May 2011	Sport Victoria	0–3	Universidad San Martín	Estadio José Picasso Peratta, Ica
15:30		Report	Manuel Tejada 43' 50'; Benjamín Ubierna 73'	Referee: Luis Seminario

29 May 2011	Unión Huaral	3–1	CNI	Estadio Julio Lores Colán, Huaral
15:30	Jonathan Obregón 25'; Luis Paredes 60'; Marco Salinas 85'	Report	Nicolás Celis 50'	Referee: Silvia Reyes

29 May 2011	Sportivo Huracán	1–1 (5–4 p)	Melgar	Estadio Monumental Virgen de Chapi, Arequipa
15:45	Marco Martínez 75'	Report	Antonio Meza Cuadra 1'	Referee: Yovani Quevedo
	Penalties
	Percy Manchego (penalty scored); José Luis Vásquez (penalty scored); Marco Martínez (penalty missed); Édgar Romaní (penalty scored); Éder Fernandez (penalty scored); Luis Arizaga (penalty scored)		(penalty scored) Fernando Del Solar; (penalty scored) Renzo Reaños; (penalty missed) Christian Zúñiga; (penalty scored) Juan José Barros; (penalty scored) Karlo Calcina; (penalty missed) Ángel Ojeda

8 June 2011	Alianza Unicachi	2–0	Cobresol	Estadio Enrique Torres Belón, Puno
15:00	Atilio Francia 49'; Robert Ardiles 67'	Report		Referee: Eduardo Chirinos

== Final stage ==
=== Bracket ===
First round	Quarter-finals
Sporting Pizarro	3	1	4 (1)
Sport Huancayo (p)	1	3	4 (3)
Sport Huancayo (p)	1	1	2 (4)
U. César Vallejo	2	0	2 (2)
Atlético Grau	2	1	3 (3)
U. César Vallejo (p)	2	1	3 (4)
Serie A
UTC	0	1	1 (3)
Real Garcilaso (p)	0	1	1 (4)
Real Garcilaso	1	1	2 (5)
Sport Áncash (p)	1	1	2 (6)
Sport Áncash	4	1	5
Sportivo Huracán	1	1	2
Universidad San Martín	0	0	0
Sporting Cristal	0	1	1
Sporting Cristal (p)	1	0	1 (5)
Alianza Unicachi	1	0	1 (4)
Juan Aurich	3	1	4 (2)
Alianza Unicachi (p)	1	3	4 (3)
Serie B
Unión Huaral	3	0	3 (3)
Deportivo Municipal (p)	2	1	3 (5)
Deportivo Municipal	2	2	4 (5)
José Gálvez (p)	2	2	4 (6)
José Gálvez (p)	2	0	2 (3)
José María Arguedas	1	1	2 (2)

Semi-finals
Sport Huancayo	1	2	3 (6)
Sport Áncash (p)	2	1	3 (7)
Sporting Cristal	0	1	1
José Gálvez	1	1	2

Final
Sport Áncash	1	2	3
José Gálvez	1	6	7

=== Round of 16 ===
==== First leg ====
8 June 2011	Sport Áncash	4–1	Sportivo Huracán	Estadio Rosas Pampa, Huaraz
20:15	Diego Silva 51'; Juan Carrillo 67'; Fabricio Lenci 72', 78'	Report	Édgar Romaní 13'	Referee: Luis Seminario

9 June 2011	José Gálvez	2–1	José María Arguedas	Estadio Manuel Rivera Sánchez, Chimbote
19:30	Janio Posito 9'; Miguel Silva 23'	Report	Christian Sánchez 63'	Referee: Miguel Santiváñez

12 June 2011	Universidad San Martín	0–0	Sporting Cristal	Estadio San Martín de Porres, Lima
14:00		Report		Referee: Alejandro Villanueva

12 June 2011	Atlético Grau	2–2	Universidad César Vallejo	Estadio Miguel Grau, Piura
15:00	Reynaldo Rojas 7'; Jhuosephz Padilla 85'	Report	Lee Andonaire 65'; Victor Cedrón 83'	Referee: Diego Haro

12 June 2011	Sporting Pizarro	3–1	Sport Huancayo	Estadio Mariscal Cáceres, Tumbes
15:00	Kevin Rueda 7'; Engels Sánchez 23'; Marco Flores 49'	Report	Marcos Delgado 79'	Referee: Fernando Legario

13 June 2011	Deportivo Municipal	2–3	Unión Huaral	Manuel Bonilla Stadium, Lima
15:30	Héctor Díaz 50'; Victor Pacheco 67'	Report	Walter Cruz 6'; Jonathan Obregón 60'; Marco Salinas 86'	Referee: Albert Caballero

15 June 2011	UTC	0–0	Real Garcilaso	Estadio Héroes de San Ramón, Cajamarca
13:30		Report		Referee: Héctor Rojas

15 June 2011	Juan Aurich	3–1	Alianza Unicachi	Estadio Elías Aguirre, Chiclayo
16:00	Mario Ramírez 77'; Diego Minaya 81'; Anderson Cueto 90+1'	Report	José Shoro 72'	Referee: Mario Espichán

==== Second leg ====
15 June 2011	Sportivo Huracán	1–1	Sport Áncash	Estadio Mariano Melgar, Arequipa
15:30	Édgar Romaní 86'	Report	Juan Carrillo 42'	Referee: Alejandro Villanueva

Sport Áncash win 5–2 on aggregate.

16 June 2011	José María Arguedas	1–0 (2–3 p)	José Gálvez	Estadio Los Chankas, Andahuaylas
15:00	Joseph Campos 44'	Report		Referee: Federico Sosa
	Penalties
	Christian Sánchez (penalty missed); Eli Sánchez (penalty scored); Jersson Ramírez (penalty missed); Dennis Castro (penalty missed); Joseph Campos (penalty scored)		(penalty scored) Renzo Guevara; (penalty scored) Víctor Oviedo; (penalty missed) Raúl Robles; (penalty missed) Jairo Hernández; (penalty scored) Juan Luna

Tied 2-2 on aggregate. José Gálvez win 3–2 on penalties.

18 June 2011	Sport Huancayo	3–1 (3–1 p)	Sporting Pizarro	Estadio Huancayo, Huancayo
14:00	Deyair Reyes 3', 8'; Jonathan Acasiete 72'	Report	Francisco Vilela 64'	Referee: Eduardo Chirinos
	Penalties
	Deyair Reyes (penalty missed); Saúl Gira (penalty scored); Marcos Delgado (penalty scored); Frank Vega (penalty missed); César Zambrano (penalty scored)		(penalty scored) Jorge Cabrera; (penalty missed) Engels Sánchez; (penalty missed) Benjamín Sandoval; (penalty missed) Luis Gómez

Tied 4-4 on aggregate. Sport Huancayo win 3–1 on penalties.

18 June 2011	Sporting Cristal	1–0	Universidad San Martín	Estadio San Martín de Porres, Lima
14:30	Minzúm Quina 32'	Report		Referee: Iván Chang

Sporting Cristal win 1-0 on aggregate.

18 June 2011	Universidad César Vallejo	1–1 (4–3 p)	Atlético Grau	Estadio Mansiche, Trujillo
15:30	Jorge Cazulo 71'	Report	Reynaldo Rojas 56'	Referee: Freddy Arellanos
	Penalties
	Héctor Hurtado (penalty scored); Sidney Faiffer (penalty missed); Roberto Demus (penalty scored); Atilio Muente (penalty scored); Alonso Bazalar (penalty missed); Andrés López (penalty scored)		(penalty scored) Ariel Peña; (penalty scored) Jhuosephz Padilla; (penalty missed) Josimar Zegarra; (penalty scored) Diego Martínez; (penalty missed) Luis Salhuana; (penalty missed) Juan Hidalgo

Tied 3-3 on aggregate. Universidad César Vallejo win 4–3 on penalties.

19 June 2011	Real Garcilaso	1–1 (4–3 p)	UTC	Estadio Garcilaso, Cusco
13:30	Giancarlo Chichizola 17'	Report	Raúl Aleman 68'	Referee: Jesús Vásquez
	Penalties
	Ramón Rodríguez (penalty scored); Ricardo Uribe (penalty missed); Jaime Huerta (penalty scored); Christian Vildoso (penalty scored); Paul Rodriguez (penalty scored)		(penalty scored) Angel Guerrero; (penalty scored) Paolo Joya; (penalty missed) Andy Salinas; (penalty scored) Raúl Alemán; (penalty missed) Alexander Fajardo

Tied 1-1 on aggregate. Real Garcilaso win 4–3 on penalties.

19 June 2011	Alianza Unicachi	3–1 (3–2 p)	Juan Aurich	Estadio Miguel Grau, Callao
15:00	Robert Ardiles 11'; José Shoro 30'; Edson Chacaliaza 52'	Report	Julio Talaviña 79'	Referee: Julio Álvarez
	Penalties
	Pedro Sanguinetti (penalty missed); Edson Chacaliaza (penalty scored); Luis Galliquio (penalty scored); Alberto Monserrate (penalty missed); Robert Ardiles (penalty missed); Ángel Venegas (penalty scored)		(penalty missed) Jersson Vasquez; (penalty scored) Anderson Cueto; (penalty scored) Martín Tenemás; (penalty missed) Mario Velarde; (penalty missed) Jorge Molina; (penalty missed) Julio Talaviña

Tied 4-4 on aggregate. Alianza Unicachi win 3–2 on penalties.

19 June 2011	Unión Huaral	0–1 (3–5 p)	Deportivo Municipal	Estadio Julio Lores Colán, Huaral
15:30		Report	Ray Espinoza 81'	Referee: Miguel Santiváñez
	Penalties
	Ángel Kobatsu (penalty missed); Erick Gómez (penalty scored); Kevin Muñoz (penalty scored); Héctor Omar Ramírez (penalty scored)		(penalty scored) Carlos García; (penalty scored) Rudy Maraví; (penalty scored) Lorenzo Ventura; (penalty scored) Alexander Castillo; (penalty scored) Junior Ramos

Tied 3-3 on aggregate. Deportivo Municipal win 5–3 on penalties.

=== Quarterfinals ===
==== First leg ====
22 June 2011	José Gálvez	2–2	Deportivo Municipal	Estadio Manuel Rivera Sánchez, Chimbote
20:00	Juan Luna 48'; Cosme Garcete 69'	Report	Carlos Rodríguez 57'; Rudy Maraví 84'	Referee: Albert Caballero

25 June 2011	Universidad César Vallejo	2–1	Sport Huancayo	Estadio Mansiche, Trujillo
15:30	Mario Leguizamón 53'; Jorge Cazulo 54'	Report	César Ortiz 32'	Referee: Miguel Santiváñez

26 June 2011	Alianza Unicachi	1–1	Sporting Cristal	Estadio San Martín de Porres, Lima
14:00	José Shoro 26'	Report	Andy Pando 37'	Referee: Diego Haro

26 June 2011	Sport Áncash	1–1	Real Garcilaso	Estadio Rosas Pampa, Huaraz
15:15	Einer Vásquez 33'	Report	Giancarlo Chichizola 62'	Referee: Yovani Quevedo

==== Second leg ====
29 June 2011	Real Garcilaso	1–1 (5-6 p)	Sport Áncash	Estadio Garcilaso de la Vega, Cusco
13:30	Ramón Rodríguez 48'	Report	Cord Cleque 13'	Referee: Luis Garay
	Penalties
	Ramón Rodríguez (penalty scored); José Crovetto (penalty scored); Christian Vildoso (penalty scored); Miguel Reyna (penalty scored); Giancarlo Chichizola (penalty missed); Ricardo Uribe (penalty scored); Freddy García (penalty missed)		(penalty scored) Juan Carrillo; (penalty scored) Lionel Alguedas; (penalty scored) Cord Cleque; (penalty scored) Hugo Alvarado; (penalty missed) José Yances; (penalty scored) Jossimar Rosales; (penalty scored) Juan Rodríguez

Tied 2-2 on aggregate. Sport Áncash win 6-5 on penalties.

29 June 2011	Sporting Cristal	0–0 (5–4 p)	Alianza Unicachi	Estadio San Martín de Porres, Lima
14:30		Report		Referee: Alberto Lozano
	Penalties
	Ximénez (penalty scored); Carranza (penalty scored); Palacios (penalty scored); W. Fernández (penalty scored); Espinoza (penalty scored)		(penalty scored) Montenegro; (penalty scored) Sanguinetti; (penalty scored) Chacaliaza; (penalty scored) Castillo; (penalty missed) Saldaña

29 June 2011	Sport Huancayo	1–0 (4-2 p)	Universidad César Vallejo	Estadio Huancayo, Huancayo
15:00	Hilden Salas 54'	Report		Referee: Luis Seminario
	Penalties
	Blas López (penalty scored); Miguel Mostto (penalty scored); Marcos Delgado (penalty missed); Johan Sotil (penalty scored); Christian Pabón (penalty scored)		(penalty scored) Víctor Rossel; (penalty missed) Josef López; (penalty missed) Lee Andonaire; (penalty scored) Andrés López

Tied 2-2 on aggregate. Sport Huancayo win 4-2 on penalties.

30 June 2011	Deportivo Municipal	2–2 (5-6 p)	José Gálvez	Manuel Bonilla Stadium, Lima
15:00	Roberto Ruiz 27', 65'	Report	Javier Carnero 11'; Juan Luna 90+4'	Referee: Roberto Mauro
	Penalties
	Roberto Ruiz (penalty scored); Fernando Flores (penalty missed); Lorenzo Ventura (penalty missed); Alexander Castillo (penalty scored); Carlos Rodríguez (penalty scored); Diego Robladillo (penalty scored); José Honores (penalty scored); Héctor Díaz (penalty missed)		(penalty scored) Ricardo Ronceros; (penalty scored) Daniel Peláez; (penalty missed) Moisés Cabada; (penalty missed) Miguel Silva; (penalty scored) Juan Luna; (penalty scored) Janio Posito; (penalty scored) Carlos Díaz; (penalty scored) Juan Zevallos

Tied 4-4 on aggregate. José Gálvez win 6-5 on penalties.

=== Semifinals ===
==== First leg ====
6 July 2011	José Gálvez	1–0	Sporting Cristal	Estadio Manuel Rivera Sánchez, Chimbote
18:00	Ricardo Salcedo 32'	Report		Referee: Henry Gambetta

6 July 2011	Sport Áncash	2–1	Sport Huancayo	Estadio Rosas Pampa, Huaraz
20:15	Jairo Cárdenas 9'; Fabricio Lenci 18'	Report	Irven Avila 43'	Referee: Julio Alvarez

==== Second leg ====
13 July 2011	Sporting Cristal	1–1	José Gálvez	Estadio San Martín de Porres, Lima
14:00	Piero Alva 58'	[Report]	Miguel Silva 52'	Referee: Georges Buckley

13 July 2011	Sport Huancayo	2–1 (6-7 p)	Sport Áncash	Estadio Huancayo, Huancayo
14:00	Irven Avila 32'; Irven Avila 87'	[ Report]	Einer Vasquez 69'	Referee: Ivan Chang
	Penalties
	Blas Lopez (penalty scored); Irven Avila (penalty scored); Johan Sotil (penalty scored); Cesar Ortiz (penalty missed); Rafael Farfan (penalty missed); Cesar Zambrano (penalty scored); Annier Figueroa (penalty scored); Frank Vega (penalty scored); Deyair Reyes (penalty missed)		(penalty missed) Juan Carrillo; (penalty scored) Fabricio Lenci; (penalty scored) Cord Cleque; (penalty scored) Ysmael Regalado; (penalty missed) Hugo Alvarado; (penalty scored) Juan Rodriguez; (penalty scored) Juan Solis; (penalty scored) Jairo Cardenas; (penalty scored) Arturo Bustinza

Tied 3-3 on aggregate. Sport Áncash win 7-6 on penalties.

=== Finals ===
24 July 2011
15:15

Sport Áncash	1–1	José Gálvez
Natalio Portillo 71'		Luis Mayme 56'

Estadio Rosas Pampa, Huaraz
Referee: Henry Gambetta
30 July 2011
19:30

José Gálvez	6–2	Sport Áncash
Luis Cordero 4'; Cesar Medina 14'; Sixto Santacruz 18'; Sixto Santacruz 40'; Cesar Medina 49'; Cesar Medina 74'		Fabricio Lenci 56'; Fabricio Lenci 62'

Estadio Manuel Rivera Sánchez, Chimbote
Referee: Georges Buckley

== Top goalscorers ==
6 goals

- (Argentina) Fabricio Lenci (Sport Áncash)

3 goals

- (Peru) Cesar Medina (José Gálvez)
- (Peru) José Shoro (Alianza Unicachi)
- (Peru) Giancarlo Chichizola (Real Garcilaso)
- (Peru) Einer Vasquez (Sport Áncash)
- (Peru) Irven Avila (Sport Huancayo)

2 goals

- (Peru) Jonathan Obregón (Unión Huaral)
- (Peru) Juan Carrillo (Sport Áncash)
- (Peru) Miguel Silva (José Gálvez)
- (Peru) Andy Pando (Sporting Cristal)
- (Peru) Manuel Tejada (Universidad San Martín)
- (Peru) Jorge Cazulo (Universidad César Vallejo)
- (Peru) Reynaldo Rojas (Grau)
- (Peru) Christian Sánchez (José María Arguedas)
- (Peru) Manco Salinas (Unión Huaral)
- (Peru) Deyair Reyes (Sport Huancayo)
- (Peru) Robert Ardiles (Alianza Unicachi)
- (Peru) Edgar Romani (Sportivo Huracán)
