= Hermoza =

Hermoza is a Spanish surname. Notable people with the surname include:

- Éder Hermoza (born 1990), Peruvian footballer
- Edivaldo Hermoza (born 1985), Bolivian footballer
