= Andrés Bedoya =

Peruvian footballer (1928–1961)

Personal information
- Full name: Andrés Noé Bedoya Díaz
- Date of birth: 10 November 1928
- Place of birth: Lima, Peru
- Date of death: 8 February 1961 (aged 32)
- Place of death: Lima, Peru
- Position: Defender

Senior career*
Years	Team	Apps	(Gls)
1948	Escuela Vitarte		
1949–1950	Independiente Medellín		
1951	Huracán de Medellín		
1951–1959	Atlético Chalaco		

International career
1954–1955	Peru	6	(0)
- * Club domestic league appearances and goals

Andrés Noé Bedoya Díaz (10 November 1928 – 8 February 1961) was a Peruvian professional footballer who played as defender.

He was nicknamed El cronómetro (The stopwatch) because of the precision of his game.

== Playing career ==
=== Club career ===
Andrés Bedoya began his career in 1948 at Escuela Vitarte, an amateur club in his district. In 1949, he emigrated to Colombia, joining Independiente Medellín, during a period known as El Dorado, when Colombian football attracted the biggest stars of South American football. There, he reunited with some of his compatriots (Juan Castillo, Reinaldo Luna, Félix Mina, René Rosasco, and the brothers Enrique and Agapito Perales), forming the core of the club, whose team was nicknamed La Danza del Sol (the dance of the sun) due to the large number of Peruvian footballers in its ranks (up to 12 players). Moreover, the Peruvian contingent continued to bolster Independiente de Medellín the following year with the arrival of Segundo Castillo, Constantino Perales, Luis Navarrete, Roberto Drago, and Luis ‘Caricho’ Guzmán. In 1951, he moved to Huracán de Medellín—which was relegated at the end of the season—before returning to Peru.

Back in his home country, he signed with Atlético Chalaco of the port city of Callao and became one of the club's emblematic players, alongside other notables such as Paraguayan goalkeeper Adolfo Riquelme (South American champion in 1953). With this team, he came close to winning the league title, finishing as runner-up in two consecutive seasons in 1957 and 1958.

=== International career ===
Called up to the Peruvian national team for the 1953, 1955, and 1956 South American Championships, Bedoya only played in the second tournament. In 1953, he was not included in the starting lineup, as his right-back position was taken by José Allen, and in 1956, he lost his place to Carlos Lazón.

He did, however, start in the 1955 South American Championship in Chile, where Peru finished third, notably with a standout performance in the 2–1 victory over Uruguay. He played a total of six matches for his national team.

== Death ==
Suffering from tuberculosis, Andrés Bedoya died on February 8, 1961, at the age of 32. As a tribute, the Andres Bedoya Diaz stadium in his native district bears his name.
