= 2011 FBC Melgar season =

FBC Melgar
2011 season
- Stadium: Estadio Monumental Virgen de Chapi
- Torneo Descentralizado: Primera Etapa: Fifteen (15°); Segunda Etapa: Twelfth (12°); Aggregate Table: Twelfth (12°); Twelfth National (12°)
- Copa del Inca: Round of 32
Home colours	Away colours	Third colours

The 2011 FBC Melgar season were the Ninety-Seventh (97.º) of the club from its foundation in 1915, Forty-Two (42) participations in the top-flight of Peruvian Primera División (of 95 Editions) with denomination Torneo Descentralizado. In Previous Season the club qualified as 12th Place of the 2010 Torneo Descentralizado.

Melgar were a of sixteen (16) clubs in the Forty-Sixth edition (46.º) Torneo Descentralizado, the competition most important of the Peruvian football. The club played the Peruvian Primera División and Copa del Inca.

== Torneo Descentralizado ==
=== Primera etapa ===
Pos	Team	Pld	W	D	L	GF	GA	GD	Pts
14	Sport Boys^{1}	15	4	3	8	11	28	-17	15
15	FBC Melgar	15	3	4	8	11	23	-12	13
16	Alianza Atlético	15	4	1	10	10	23	-13	13

== See also ==
- FBC Melgar
- 2011 Torneo Descentralizado
