= Juan Goyoneche =

Peruvian football player (born 1985)

Personal information
- Full name: Juan Gilberto Goyoneche Carrasco
- Date of birth: October 14, 1985 (age 41)
- Place of birth: San Vicente de Cañete, Peru
- Height: 1.88 m (6 ft 2 in)
- Position: Goalkeeper

Team information
- Current team: UTC

Youth career
- Alianza Lima

Senior career*
Years	Team	Apps	(Gls)
2005–2009	Alianza Lima	1	(0)
2010	Deportivo Municipal		
2010	Juventud Barranco	2	(0)
2011	Atlético Grau	2	(0)
2012	Real Garcilaso	27	(0)
2013–2016	Juan Aurich	18	(0)
2016–2017	Sport Huancayo	2	(0)
2017	UCV	3	(0)
2018–	UTC	0	(0)
- * Club domestic league appearances and goals as of 26 February 2018

Juan Gilberto Goyoneche Carrasco (born 14 October 1985) is a Peruvian football player. He is a goalkeeper who currently plays for Universidad Técnica de Cajamarca.

== Club career ==
Goyoneche made his debut for Alianza Lima in 2005 season because of an injury at that time to Leao Butrón.

Goyoneche played for Juventud Barranco in the 2010 Copa Perú.

In 2011, he played for Piura based club Atlético Grau in the 2011 Copa Perú season. He also made 3 appearances for Atlético Grau in the 2011 Torneo Intermedio. Goyoneche played in the round of 16 tie against C.D. Universidad Cesar Vallejo. The match was decided in a penalty shootout, which his side lost 4–3.

In January 2012, Goyoneche joined newly promoted club Real Garcilaso for the start of the 2012 season.
