= Bazalar =

Bazalar is a surname. Notable people with the surname include:

- Alonso Bazalar (born 1990), Peruvian footballer
- Diana Bazalar (born 1995), Peruvian hurdler
- Juan Carlos Bazalar (born 1968), Peruvian football manager

== See also ==
- Pedro Anselmo Bazalar, Peruvian football club
