= Estadio Municipal Manuel Eloy Molina Robles =

Stadium in Peru

Estadio Manuel Eloy Molina Robles
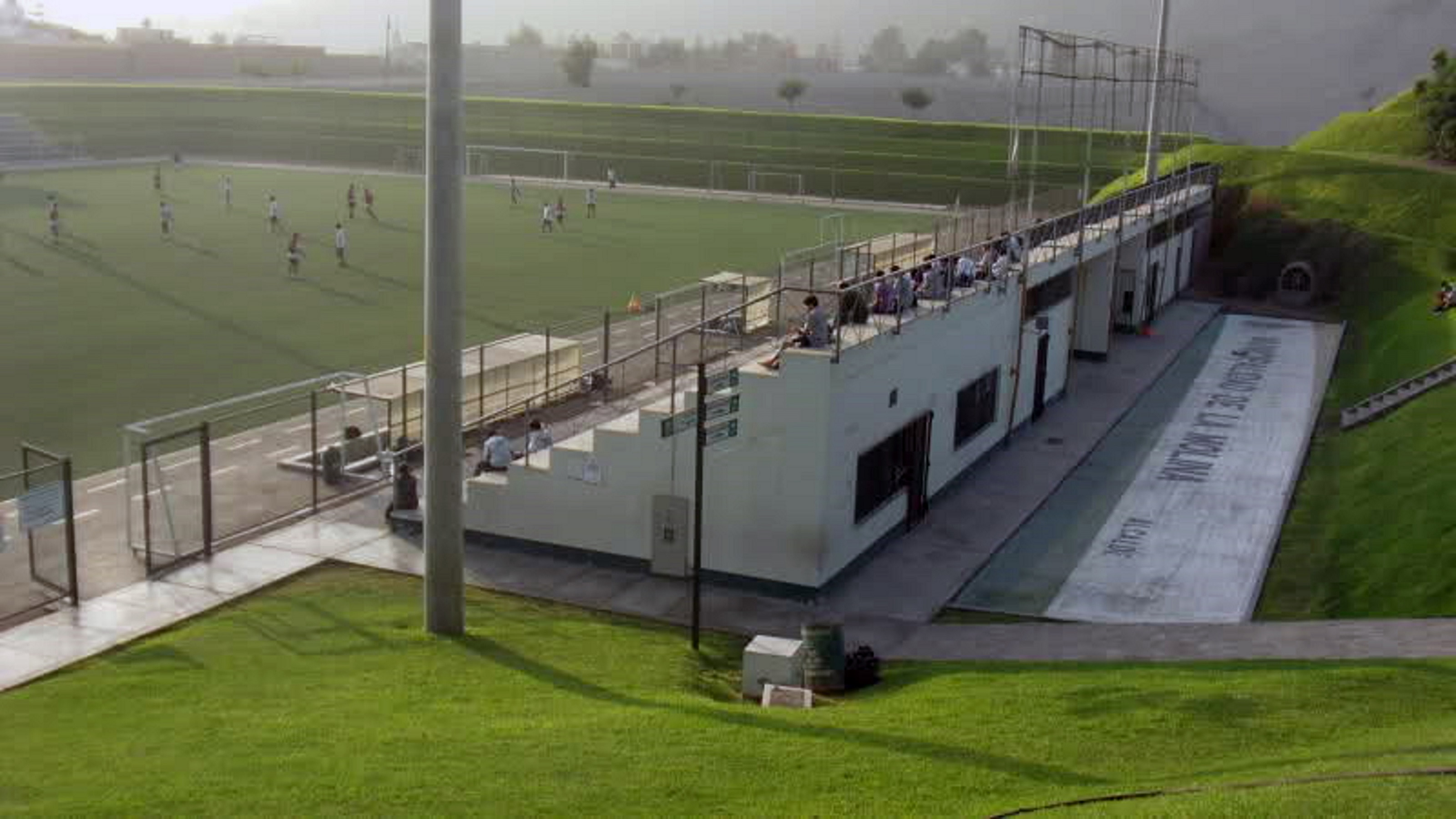
- Interactive map of Estadio Manuel Eloy Molina Robles
- Full name: Estadio Municipal Manuel Eloy Molina Robles
- Location: Huanta, Peru
- Coordinates: 12.9359°S 74.2421°W
- Owner: Instituto Peruano del Deporte (IPD)
- Capacity: 7,500
- Surface: Grass

Construction
- Opened: 1975

Tenant
- Sport Huanta Ayacucho FC

Estadio Municipal Manuel Eloy Molina Robles is a multi-use stadium in Huanta, Peru. The stadium is home to Sport Huanta of the Copa Perú. Ayacucho FC of the Peruvian Primera División occasionally uses the stadium. The stadium has a capacity of 7,500.

== See also ==
- List of football stadiums in Peru
