= Éder Hermoza =

Peruvian footballer (born 1990)

Eder Hermoza
Personal information
- Full name: Eder Alberto Hermoza Guevara
- Date of birth: 4 April 1990 (age 36)
- Place of birth: Lima, Peru
- Height: 1.83 m (6 ft 0 in)
- Position: Goalkeeper

Team information
- Current team: ADT
- Number: 25

Youth career
- ?–2007: Alianza Lima

Senior career*
Years	Team	Apps	(Gls)
2008	Alianza Lima	0	(0)
2009	Sport Ancash	9	(0)
2010	Total Chalaco	17	(0)
2011–2017	Univ. César Vallejo	46	(0)
2015	Willy Serrato (loan)	21	(0)
2017–2021	Sport Huancayo	24	(0)
2021–2024	Cusco	12	(0)
2024–	ADT	19	(0)

International career
2007	Peru U17		
2009	Peru U20		
- * Club domestic league appearances and goals as of 30 December 2025

Eder Alberto Hermoza Guevara (born 4 April 1990) is a Peruvian footballer who plays for ADT in the Liga 1, as a goalkeeper.

== Club career ==
Eder Hermoza began his career with Alianza Lima, joining their first team in January 2008. There he found few chances to feature for the first team as he had to compete with regular keepers Enrique Bologna, Salomon Libman, George Forsyth, and up-and-comer Juan Goyoneche. He finished his time in Alianza without making any league appearances in the 2008 season.

In January 2009 he joined Sport Ancash. There he made his Torneo Descentralizado league debut on 15 February 2009 at home to José Gálvez FBC. Manager Eduardo Asca played Hermoza from the start, but he could not keep a clean-sheet on his debut as his side lost 1–2. Hermoza played in a total of nine league matches in his debut season.

== International career ==
Hermoza was the starting goalkeeper for the Peru U17 side in the 2007 FIFA U-17 World Cup.

He later featured for the Peru U20 squad in 2009.
