= Pedro Anselmo Bazalar =

Peruvian football club

- Full name: Club Social Deportivo Pedro Anselmo Bazalar Enriquez
- Nickname(s): La marea blanca
- Founded: July 9, 2003
- Ground: Estadio Segundo Aranda Torres, Huacho
- Capacity: 8,000
- League: Copa Perú
Home colours	Away colours

Pedro Anselmo Bazalar is a Peruvian football club, playing in the city of Huacho, Peru.

== History ==
In the 2011 Torneo Intermedio, the club was eliminated by Universidad César Vallejo in the round of 32.

== Coach ==
- (Peru) Félix SIfuentes (2010)
- (Peru) Daniel Ruiz (2011)
- (Peru) Edson “Chino” Ojeda (2012-2013)
- (Peru) Mauro Portales (2013)
- (Peru) Carlos Rosario Cano (2014)
- (Peru) Facundo Meneses (2023)

== Honours ==
=== Regional ===
- Liga Distrital de Huacho:

Winners (1): 2011
Runner-up (3): 2009, 2010, 2012

== See also ==
- List of football clubs in Peru
- Peruvian football league system
