= Estadio Guillermo Briceño Rosamedina =

Football stadium in Juliaca, Peru

Coordinates: 15.5027°S 70.1234°W

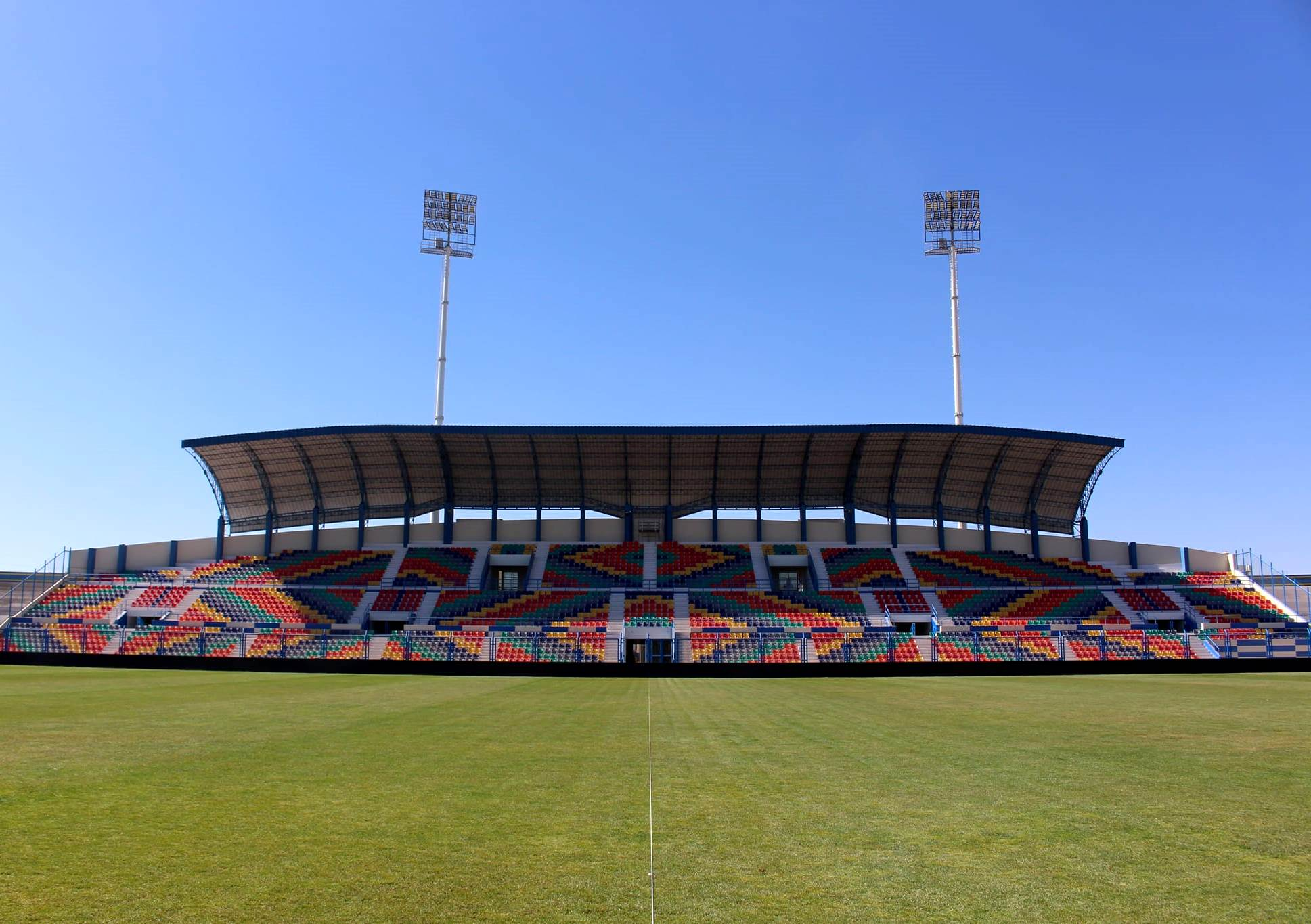
- Interactive map of Estadio Guillermo Briceño Rosamedina
- Location: Juliaca, Peru
- Owner: Instituto Peruano del Deporte
- Capacity: 20,030
- Surface: Grass
- Field size: 125 x 75 m

Construction
- Opened: 1966
- Renovated: 2020
- Expanded: 2020

Tenant
- Deportivo Binacional

Estadio Guillermo Briceño Rosamedina is a football stadium located in Juliaca, Peru. It has a capacity of 20,030 spectators and is home to local club, Deportivo Binacional, who got relegated to the Peruvian Segunda División in 2023 after their time in the Peruvian Primera División.

== History ==
The Estadio Guillermo Briceño Rosamedina originally opened in 1966. The Estadio Guillermo Briceño Rosamedina is the home stadium of Peruvian side Binacional. The stadium had a capacity of around 15,000. An expansion plan was announced in 2016 which would increase the capacity to 20,000 but did not start until 2020, where it was completed a year later in 2021.

Located 3825 meters above sea level, the stadium is known in South America for its altitude. It is considered one of the most beautiful stadiums in Peru, with a similar seat color pattern as Estadio Garcilaso in Cusco, resembling the Quechua textile patterns.

== See also ==
- List of football stadiums in Peru
