= Huepetuche District =

Coordinates: 12.9938°S 70.5254°W

Huaypetue
- District
- Interactive map of Huaypetue
- Country: Peru
- Region: Madre de Dios
- Province: Manú
- Founded: June 9, 2000
- Capital: Huaypetue

Government
  - Mayor: Gelman Enrique Villegas Guillen

Area
  - Total: 1,478.42 km^{2} (570.82 sq mi)
- Elevation: 400 m (1,300 ft)

Population (2005 census)
  - Total: 8,130
  - Density: 5.50/km^{2} (14.2/sq mi)
- Time zone: UTC-5 (PET)
- UBIGEO: 170204

Huaypetue District (an adaptation from the Quechua word Huepetuche) is one of four districts of Manú Province in Peru.
