= Estadio IPD de Huancavelica =

Football stadium in Peru

Coordinates: 12.784679°S 74.967996°W

The Estadio IPD de Huancavelica (IPD Stadium), it is a stadium located in the city of Huancavelica, province of Huancavelica in Peru. It is the home stadium for some teams that play in the Copa Peru such as Union Deportivo Ascension, Diablos Rojos and Racing FBC. Now it has a capacity for 2,500 spectators.

By May 2017, the stadium is now being remodeled. The works include the extension of the seats with roof, athletic field, spaces to practice another sports. At the end the stadium will have a capacity for 5,400 spectators.(1)
