= Estadio Heraclio Tapia =

Multi-purpose stadium in Huánuco, Peru

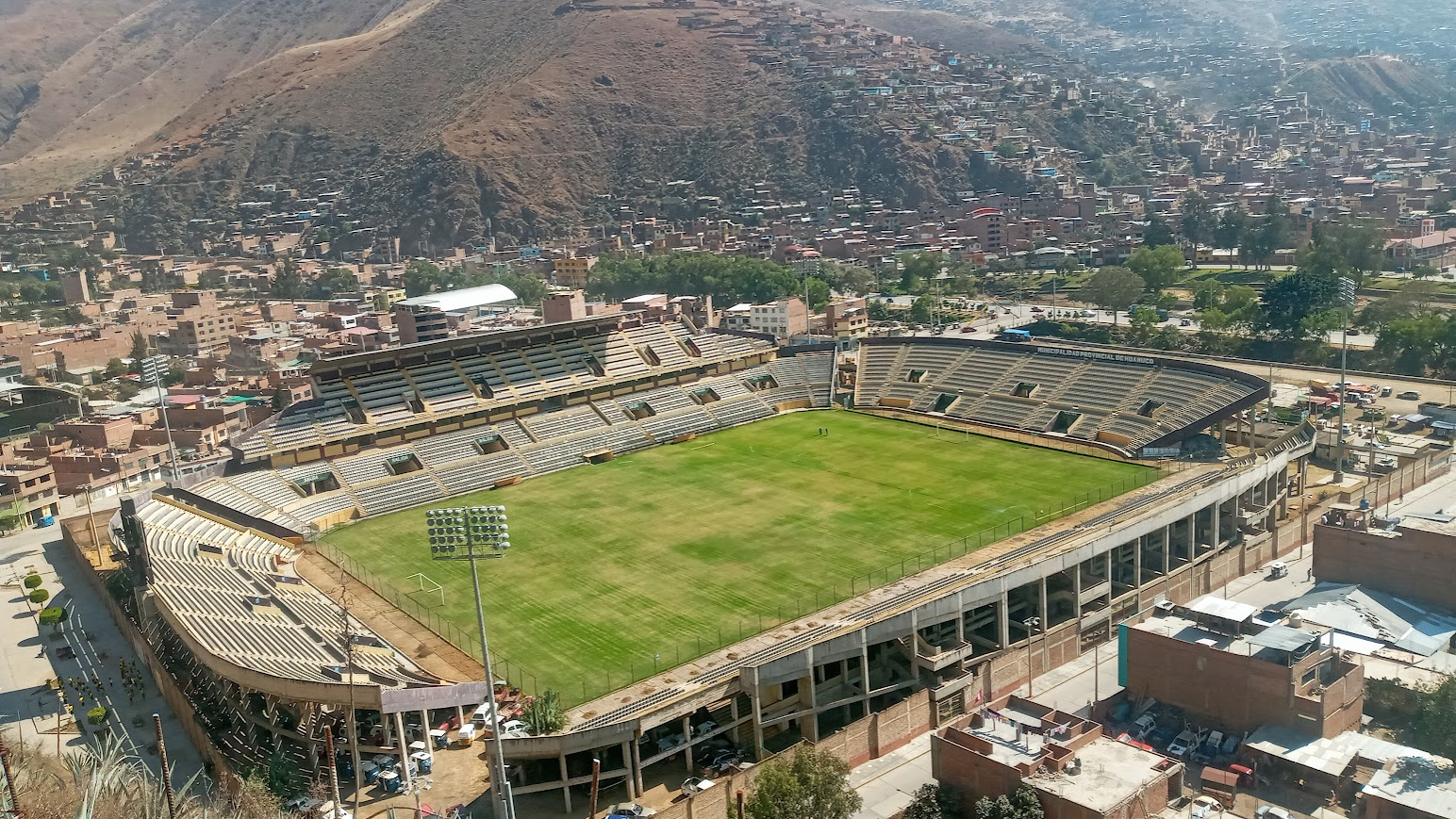
- Interactive map of Estadio Heraclio Tapia
- Full name: Estadio Municipal Heraclio Tapia León
- Location: Huánuco, Peru
- Coordinates: 9.940567°S 76.252778°W
- Owner: Instituto Peruano del Deporte (IPD)
- Capacity: 25,000 (football)
- Surface: Grass

Construction
- Built: 1972
- Renovated: 2010

Tenants
- Alianza Universidad; León de Huánuco

Estadio Municipal "Heraclio Tapia León", more commonly known as Estadio Heraclio Tapia, is a multi-purpose stadium in Huánuco, Peru. Built in 1972 and renovated in 2010, it is used by football teams Alianza Universidad of the Peruvian Primera División and León de Huánuco of the Copa Perú, along with numerous regional teams. The stadium can hold 25,000 people and is an all seater stadium. It is among the highest-altitude stadiums in South America.

== History ==
Construction began in 1972 when León de Huánuco was promoted to the Peruvian Primera División for the first time. The stadium also became home to Alianza Universidad, a rival of León de Huánuco based in the same city.

It is home to the city's football teams, including León de Huánuco and Alianza Universidad. It had its most glorious moments in the 1990s, when the Torneo Descentralizado was played there.

On December 8, 2010, the stadium hosted the largest number of people in its history, since that day León de Huánuco played the final of the 2010 Torneo Descentralizado and 18,090 people witnessed the 1-1 draw with Universidad San Martín. That day, the western grandstand was also inaugurated.

In 2011, the stadium hosted its first international matches with León de Huánuco in the 2011 Copa Libertadores. It also hosted matches of the 2012 and 2015 Copa Sudamericana.

After Alianza Universidad's promotion back to the First Division in 2024, the stadium has changed colors from León de Huánuco's brown and tan, to Alianza Universidad's blue and red.

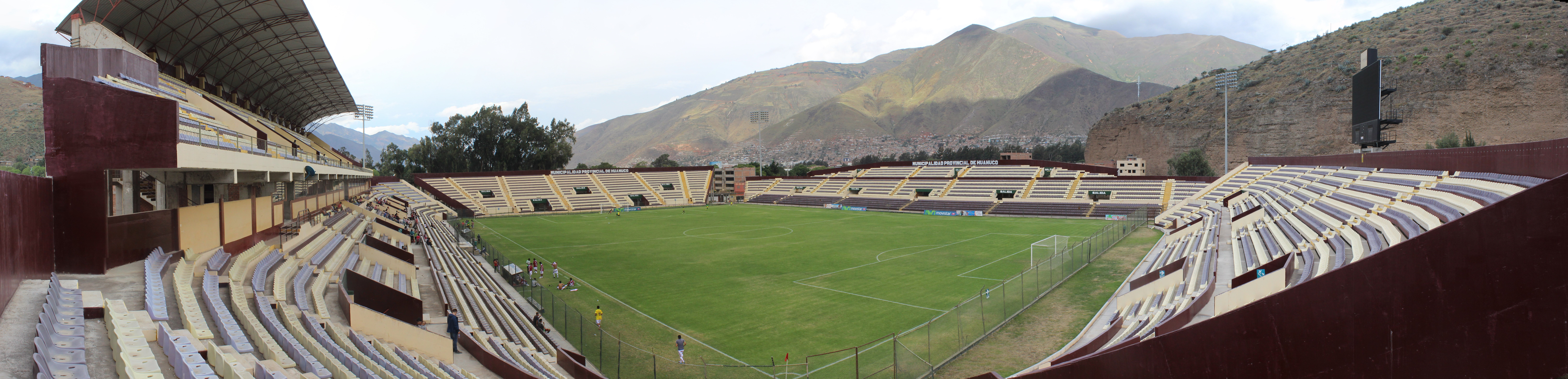
Panoramic view

== See also ==
- List of football stadiums in Peru
- Alianza Universidad
- León de Huánuco
