= Juventud Barranco =

Peruvian football club

- Full name: Asociación Club Social Deportivo Juventud Barranco
- Nicknames: Azulgranas, La Juve
- Founded: January 26, 1963
- Ground: Segundo Aranda Torres; Huacho, Lima, Peru
- Capacity: 10,000
- Manager: Daniel Ruiz
- League: Copa Perú
- 2017: Departamental Stage
Home colours	Away colours

Juventud Barranco is a Peruvian football club, playing in the city of Huacho, Lima, Peru.

== History ==
In the 2010 Copa Perú, the club qualified to the National Stage, but was eliminated by Atlético Pucallpa in the Round of 16.

== Honours ==
=== Regional ===
- Región IV: 0

Runner-up (1): 2010

- Liga Departamental de Lima: 1

Winners (1): 2010

- Liga Distrital de Huacho: 3

Winners (3): 2006, 2009, 2010

== See also ==
- List of football clubs in Peru
- Peruvian football league system
