= Estadio Aliardo Soria Pérez =

Stadium in Pucallpa, Peru

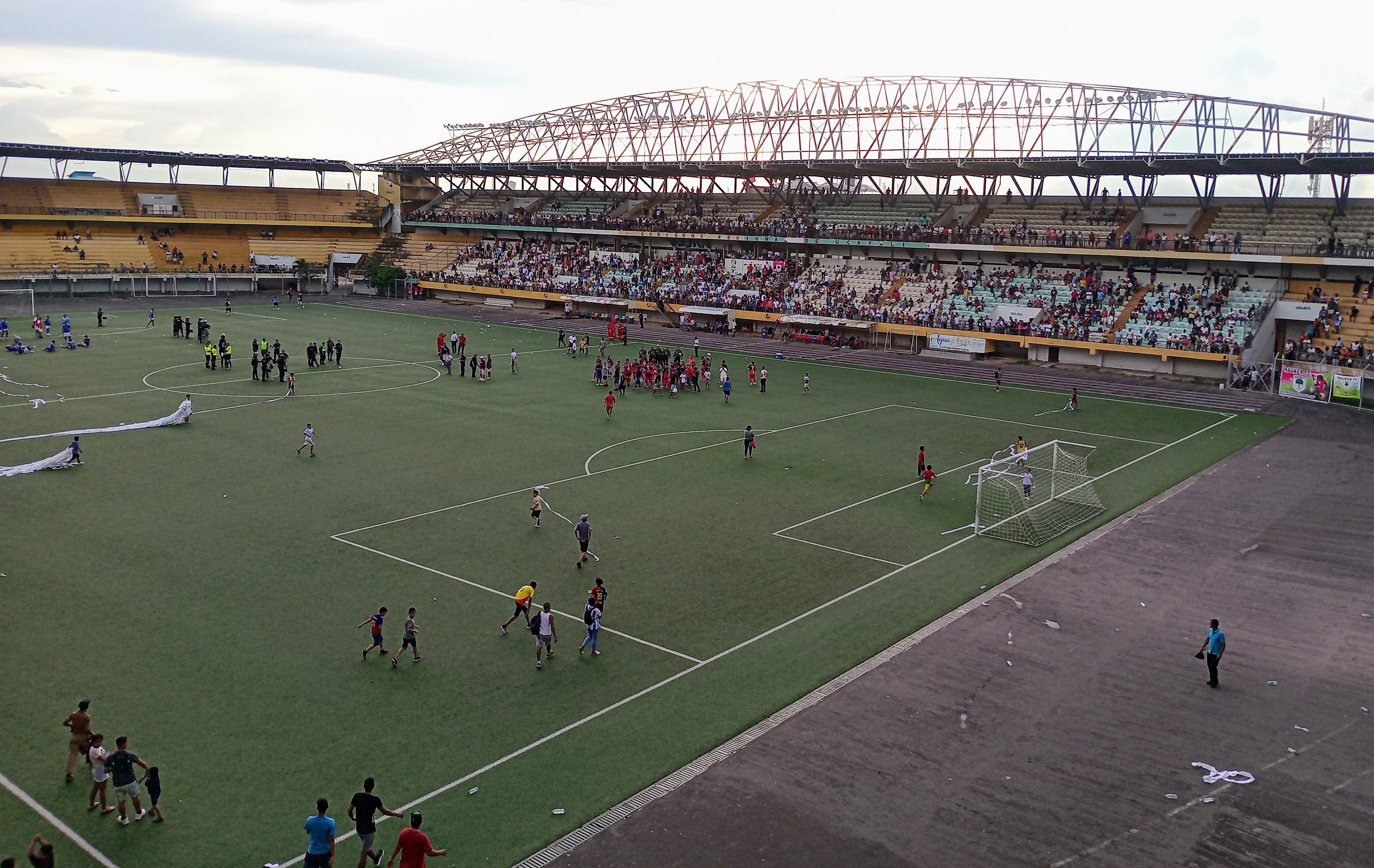
- Interactive map of Estadio Aliardo Soria Pérez
- Full name: Estadio Aliardo Soria Pérez
- Location: Pucallpa, Peru
- Coordinates: 8°23′11″S 74°32′21″W
- Capacity: 17,848

Construction
- Built: 1997

Tenant
- Tecnológico de Pucallpa

The Estadio Aliardo Soria Pérez is a multi-purpose stadium in Pucallpa, Peru. It is used by the football clubs Sport Loreto of the Copa Perú and Rauker FC of the Peruvian Tercera División. The stadium has a capacity of 17,848 and it was built in 1997. The stadium was used as a voting premises during the 2021 Peruvian election. In March 2025, the stadium was used as an emergency shelter for victims of flooding of the Ucayali river.

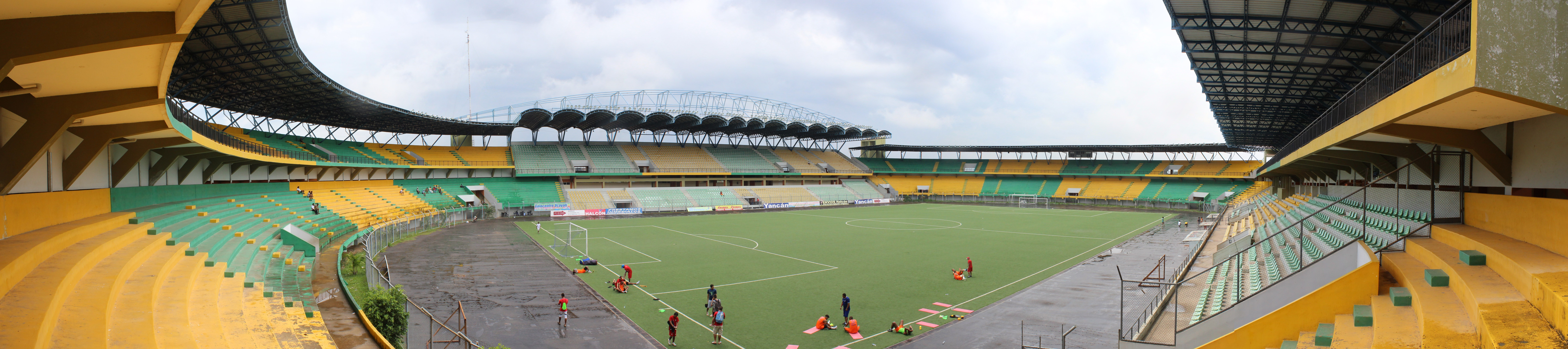
