= Andres Bedoya Diaz stadium =

Football stadium in Ate, Lima, Perú

Coordinates: 12.0280°S 76.9086°W

Andrés Bedoya Diaz stadium is an all seater football stadium in Ate, Lima, Perú.
