= Estadio Los Chankas =

Coordinates: 13.6577°S 73.3797°W

- Interactive map of Estadio Los Chankas
- Location: Andahuaylas, Peru
- Owner: Instituto Peruano del Deporte (IPD)
- Operator: Club Deportivo Los Chankas CYC
- Capacity: 10,000

Tenants
- José María Arguedas de Andahuaylas and Club Deportivo Los Chankas CYC

Estadio Los Chankas is a multi-purpose stadium in Andahuaylas, Peru. It is currently used mostly for football matches and is the home stadium of Club Deportivo Los Chankas CYC that recently got promoted to the Peruvian Primera División for the 2024 season, and Club José María Arguedas of the Copa Perú. The stadium holds 10,000 seats.
