= Estadio Municipal Carlos Vidaurre García =

- Interactive map of Estadio Municipal Carlos Vidaurre García
- Full name: Estadio Municipal Carlos Vidaurre García
- Location: Tarapoto, Peru
- Coordinates: 6°29′19.4532″S 76°22′6.0276″W
- Capacity: 7,000

Tenants
- Unión Comercio; Unión Tarapoto

Estadio Municipal Carlos Vidaurre García is a multi-use stadium in Tarapoto, Peru. It is used mostly for football matches, on club level by Unión Comercio of the Peruvian Segunda División and Unión Tarapoto of the Copa Perú. The stadium has a capacity of 7,000 spectators.
