= Estadio Unión Tarma =

Coordinates: 11.4139°S 75.6834°W

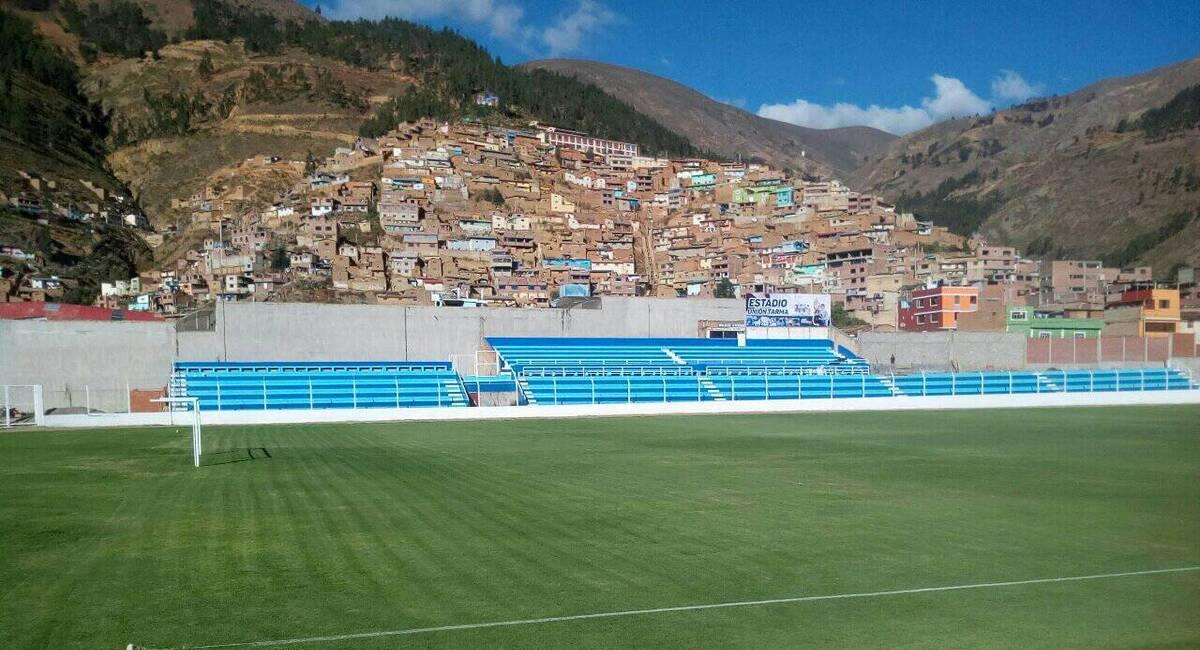
- Interactive map of Estadio Unión Tarma
- Full name: Estadio Unión Tarma
- Location: Tarma, Peru
- Owner: Instituto Peruano del Deporte (IPD)
- Capacity: 9,100
- Surface: Grass

Tenant
- Asociación Deportiva Tarma Sport Dos de Mayo

Estadio Unión Tarma is a multi-use stadium in Tarma, Peru. It is currently used mostly for football matches and is the home stadium of Asociación Deportiva Tarma (ADT) of the Liga 1, and Sport Dos de Mayo of the Copa Perú. The stadium has a capacity of 9,100 spectators.

== History ==
The stadium was used by ADT since its construction in the 1980s, which an initial capacity of 6,000. In 2021, ADT returned to the Peruvian Primera División, after gaining promotion from the 2023 Copa Perú and the stadium was used in the 2022 season. Because of ADT promotion, the stadium was renovated in 2022, and increased its capacity to 9,100.

The stadium will be renovated again in 2025, after ADT's success in qualifying for the 2024 Copa Sudamericana. Work has already begun in 2024, with the addition of a roof on the south stand.

== See also ==
- List of football stadiums in Peru
