= Estadio Monumental de Condebamba =

Multi-use stadium in Abancay

Coordinates: 13.6339°S 72.8719°W

- Interactive map of Estadio Monumental de Condebamba
- Full name: Estadio Monumental de Condebamba
- Location: Abancay, Peru
- Owner: Instituto Peruano del Deporte
- Capacity: 12,000

Construction
- Opened: 2003

Tenants
- Deportivo Educación; Miguel Grau de Abancay

Estadio Monumental de Condebamba is a multi-use stadium in Abancay, Peru. It is currently used mostly for football matches and is the home stadium of Deportivo Educación of the Copa Perú. The stadium holds 12,000 spectators.
