= Estadio IPD de Moyobamba =

Multi-use stadium in Peru

Coordinates: 6.0319°S 76.9643°W

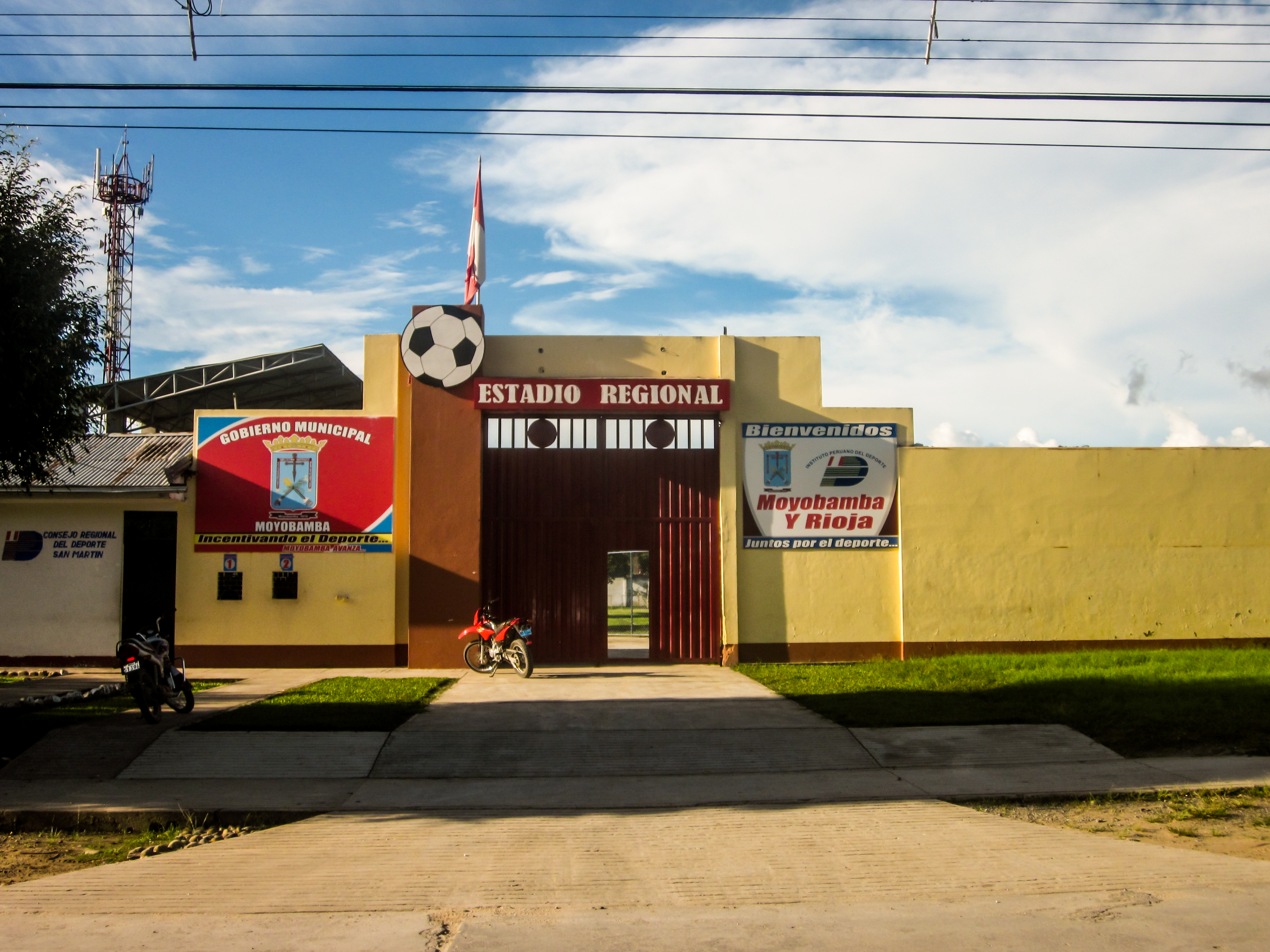
- Interactive map of Estadio IPD de Moyobamba
- Full name: Estadio IPD de Moyobamba
- Location: Moyobamba, Peru
- Owner: Instituto Peruano del Deporte
- Capacity: 8,000

Tenant
- Unión Comercio

Estadio IPD de Moyobamba is a multi-use stadium in Moyobamba, Peru. It is currently used mostly for football matches and is the home stadium of Unión Comercio of the Peruvian Primera División. The stadium holds 8,000 spectators. Renovations are expected to start on the stadium which would expand it to hold 20,000 spectators.

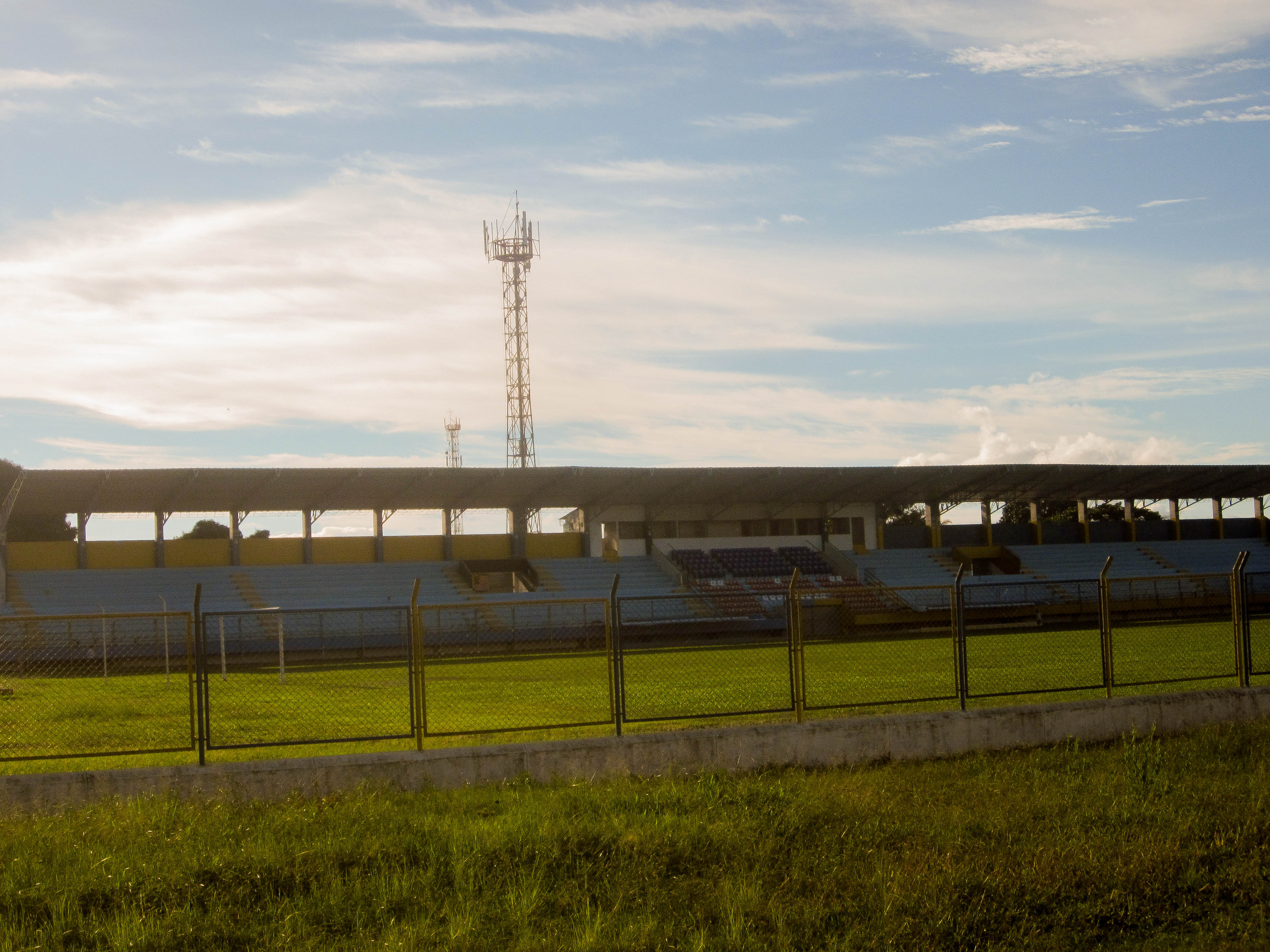
IPD de Moyobamba's west stand
