= Estadio Mariscal Cáceres =

Coordinates: 3.5571°S 80.4419°W

- Interactive map of Estadio Mariscal Cáceres
- Full name: Estadio Mariscal Cáceres
- Location: Tumbes, Peru
- Owner: Instituto Peruano del Deporte
- Capacity: 12,000

Tenants
- Defensor San José; Sporting Pizarro

Estadio Mariscal Cáceres is a multi-use stadium in Tumbes, Peru. It is currently used mostly for football matches and is the home stadium of Defensor San José and Sporting Pizarro of the Copa Perú. The stadium holds 12,000 spectators.
