= Estadio 25 de Noviembre =

Multi-purpose stadium in Moquegua, Peru

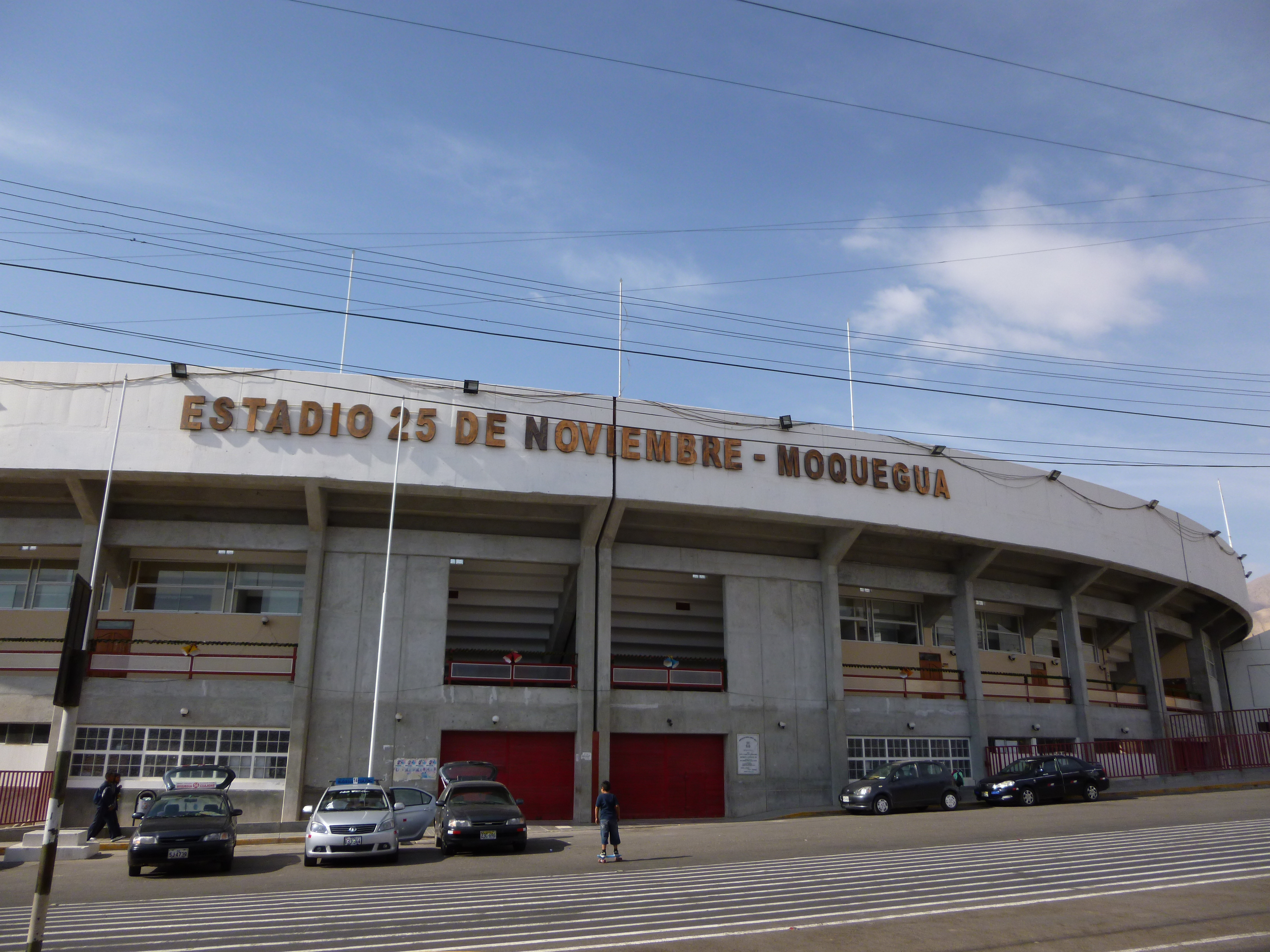
- Interactive map of Estadio 25 de Noviembre
- Location: Moquegua, Peru
- Coordinates: 17.1857°S 70.9301°W
- Capacity: 21,073

Construction
- Built: 2009
- Opened: May 31, 2009

Tenants
- Deportivo Moquegua; FCR San Antonio; Atlético Huracán de Moquegua

Estadio 25 de Noviembre is a multi-purpose stadium in Moquegua, Peru. It is currently used by football teams Deportivo Moquegua of the Peruvian Primera División, Real San Antonio of the Tercera División, and Atlético Huracán de Moquegua of the Copa Perú. Built in 2009, the stadium has a maximum capacity of 21,073 spectators.

== History ==
The stadium was built by the Peruvian Institute of Sport (IPD) and officially inaugurated in 2009 in a match between Cobresol and U América FC. Initially, the stadium could hold 9,000 spectators, but it was later expanded and renovated to accommodate 21,000.

The stadium was one of the venues for the 2011 South American U-20 Championship. It was to be one of the six venues in five cities for the 2019 FIFA U-17 World Cup until hosting rights were given to Brazil.

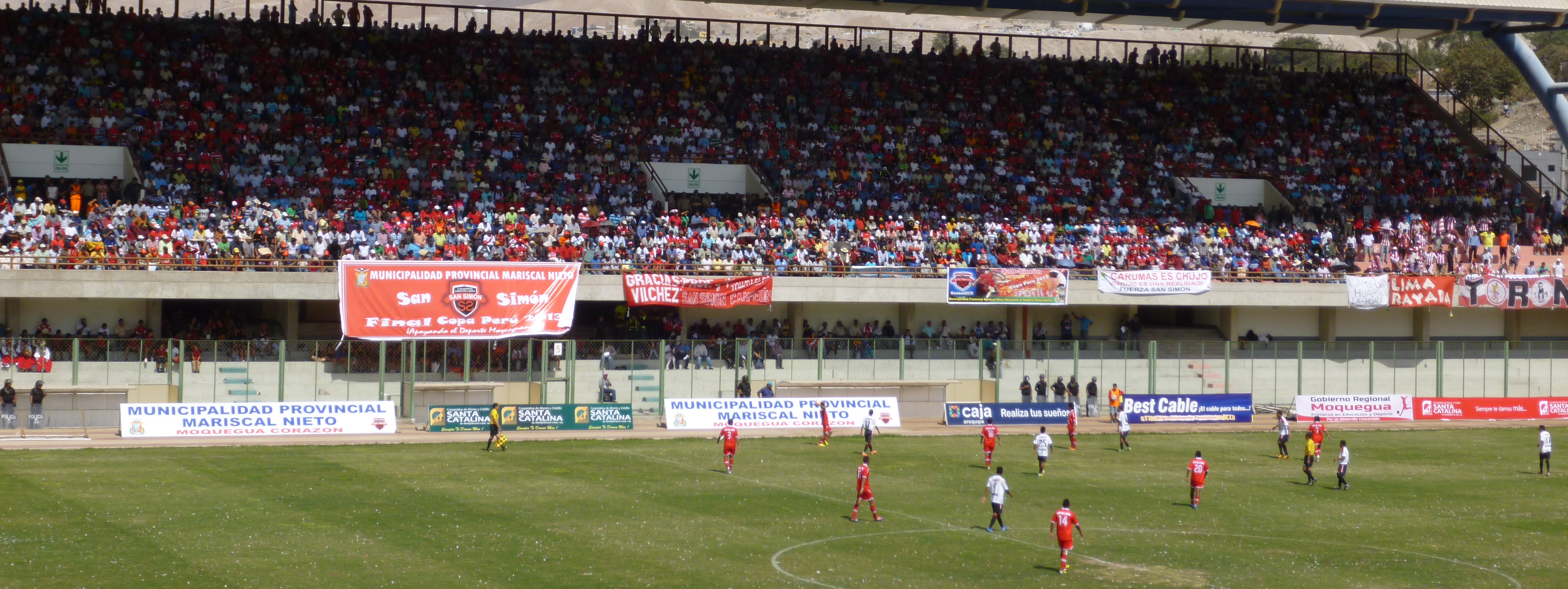
Estadio 25 de noviembre during the 2013 Copa Perú final
