= Estadio Héroes de San Ramón =

Stadium in Cajamarca, Peru

Coordinates: 7°9′42″S 78°30′39″W

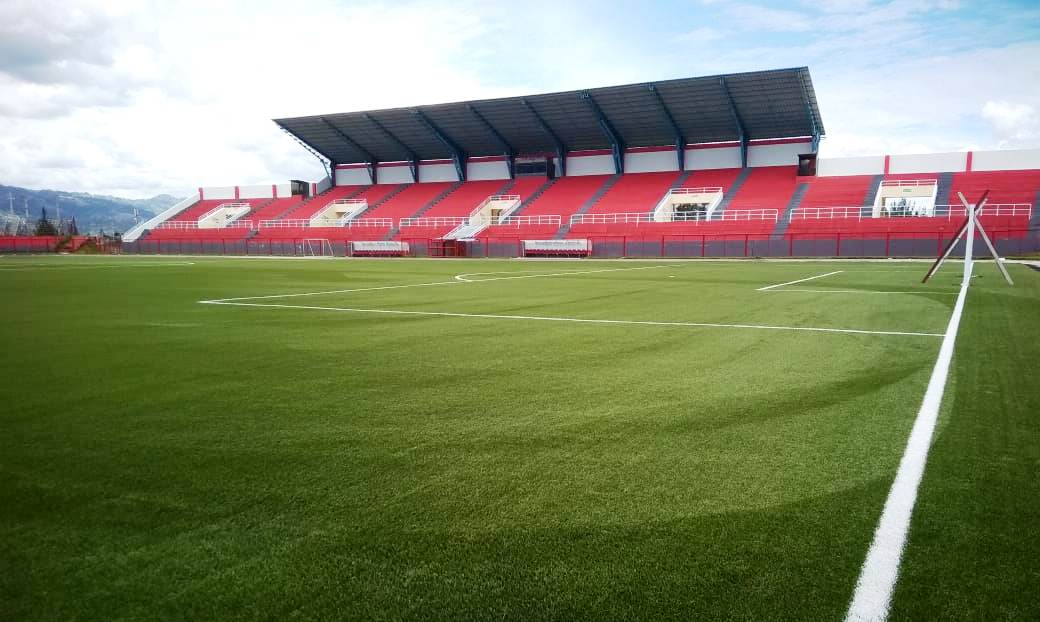
- Interactive map of Estadio Héroes de San Ramón
- Location: Cajamarca, Peru
- Owner: Instituto Peruano del Deporte
- Operator: Universidad Técnica de Cajamarca
- Capacity: 18,000 (1942–2010); 9,000 (2010–2013); 18,010 (2013–2013); 10,495 (2023–present)
- Surface: Grass

Construction
- Opened: 1942

Tenant
- Universidad Técnica de Cajamarca (1942–present)

Estadio Héroes de San Ramón is a multi-use stadium in Cajamarca (northern Andes), Peru. It is the home of the Universidad Técnica de Cajamarca of the Peruvian Primera División, and has a seating capacity of 10,495 people. The origin of its name comes from the battle of San Pablo, where three students from San Ramón de Cajamarca School died for Perú, in the War of the Pacific. This stadium is undergoing improvements by the Peruvian Sports Institute.
