= Estadio Manuel Rivera Sánchez =

Coordinates: 9.10001°S 78.560207°W

Estadio Municipal Centenario Manuel Rivera Sánchez
- Estadio Centenario
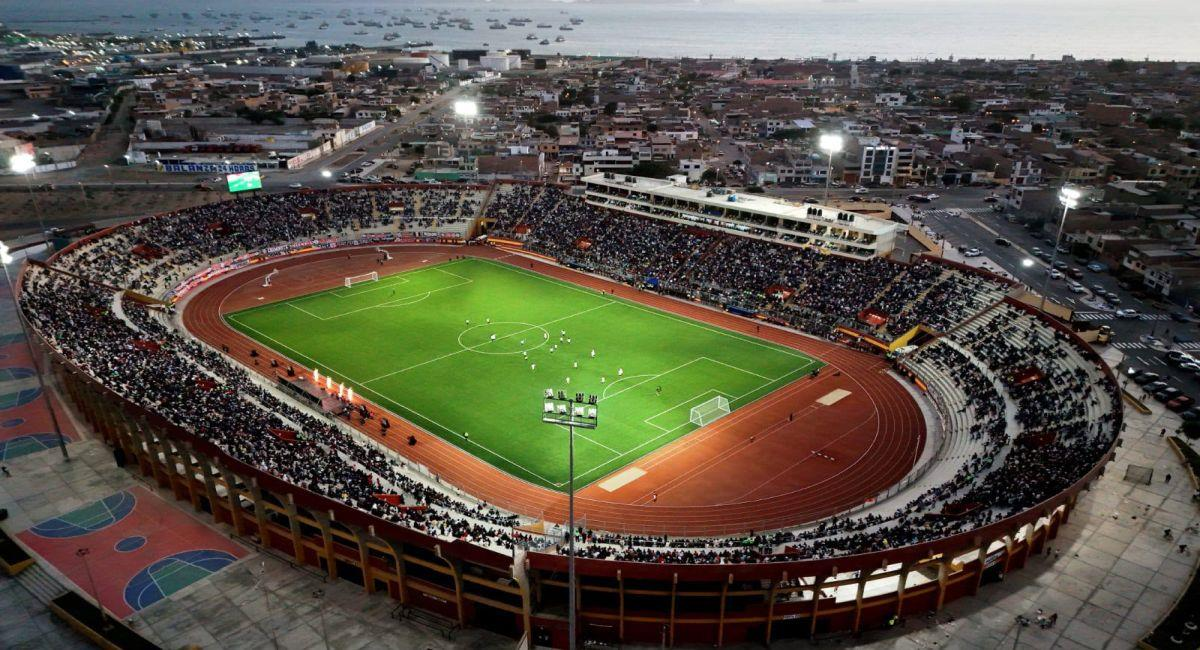
- Interactive map of Estadio Municipal Centenario Manuel Rivera Sánchez
- Full name: Estadio Municipal Centenario Manuel Rivera Sánchez
- Location: Chimbote, Peru
- Owner: Municipality of Chimbote
- Operator: Municipality of Chimbote
- Capacity: 32,000
- Surface: Artificial turf

Construction
- Built: 2006 - 2007
- Opened: June 30, 2007

Tenant
- José Gálvez FBC

Estadio Municipal Centenario Manuel Rivera Sánchez is a multi-purpose stadium in Chimbote, Peru. It was inaugurated on June 30, 2007 with a friendly game between the Peru U-17 national football team and the Colombia U-17 national football team. Peru lost 4–2. It is the home stadium of José Gálvez FBC of the Copa Perú. The stadium has a capacity of 32,000 people. It replaced Estadio Manuel Gómez Arellano.
