= Estadio Segundo Aranda Torres =

Coordinates: 11°06′04″S 77°36′16″W

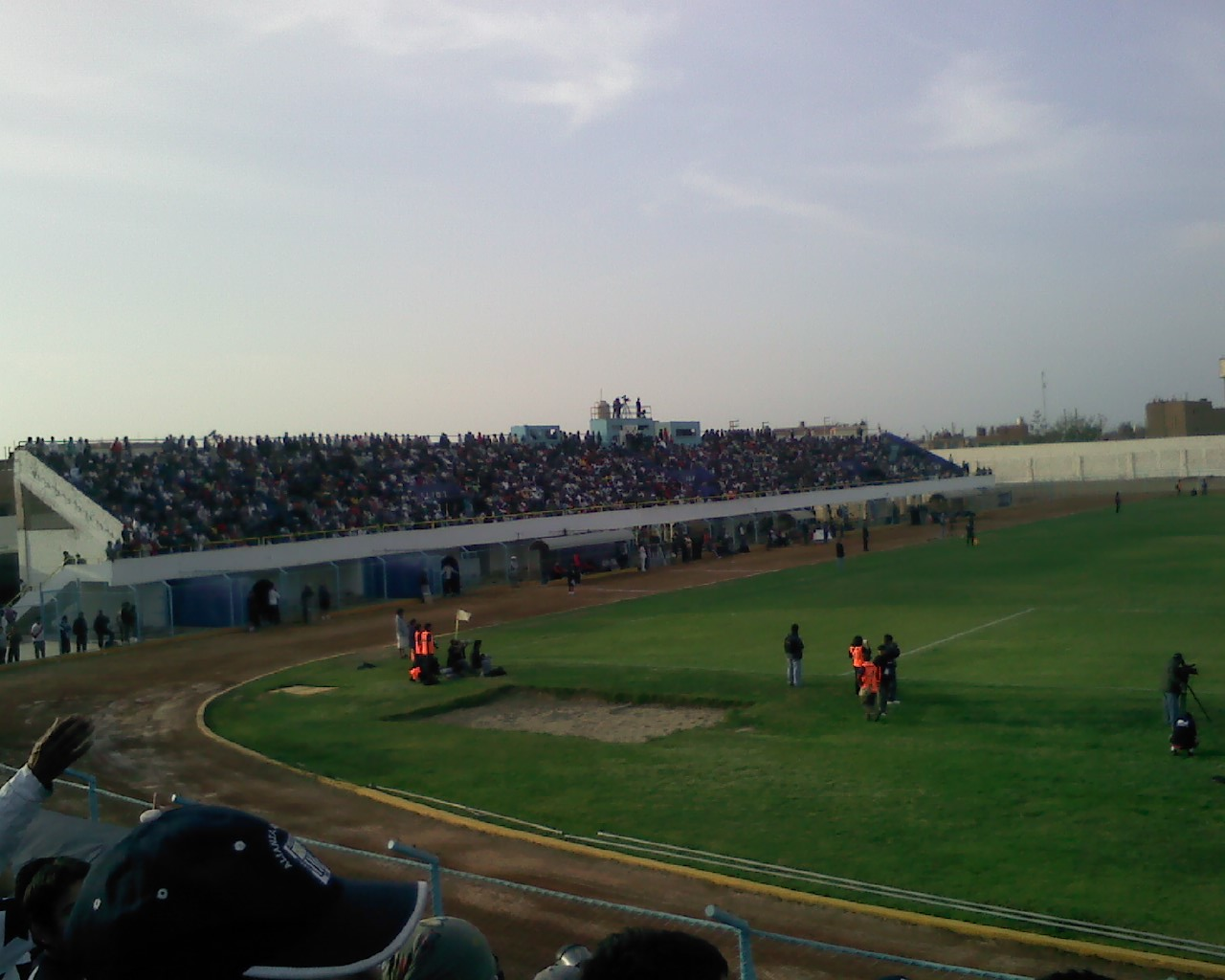
- Estadio Segundo Aranda Torres
- Interactive map of Estadio Segundo Aranda Torres
- Full name: Estadio Segundo Aranda Torres
- Location: Huacho, Peru
- Owner: Municipalidad Provincial de Huaura
- Capacity: 8,000

Tenants
- Juventud Barranco; Juventud La Palma; Total Chalaco

Estadio Segundo Aranda Torres is a multi-use stadium in Huacho, Peru. It is currently used mostly for football matches and is the home stadium of Total Chalaco of the Peruvian Segunda División and Juventud Barranco of the Copa Perú. The stadium holds 8,000 spectators.
