= Andahuaylas =

City in Peru

Andahuaylas Antawaylla San Pedro de Andahuaylas
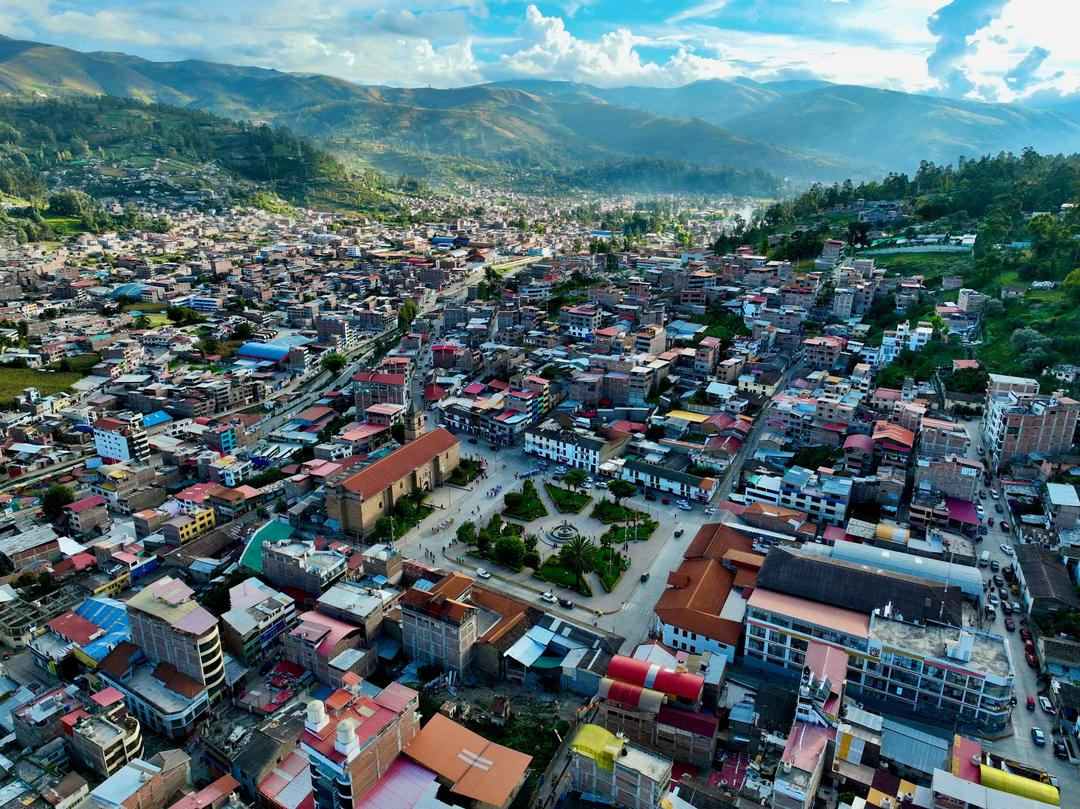
- Panorama

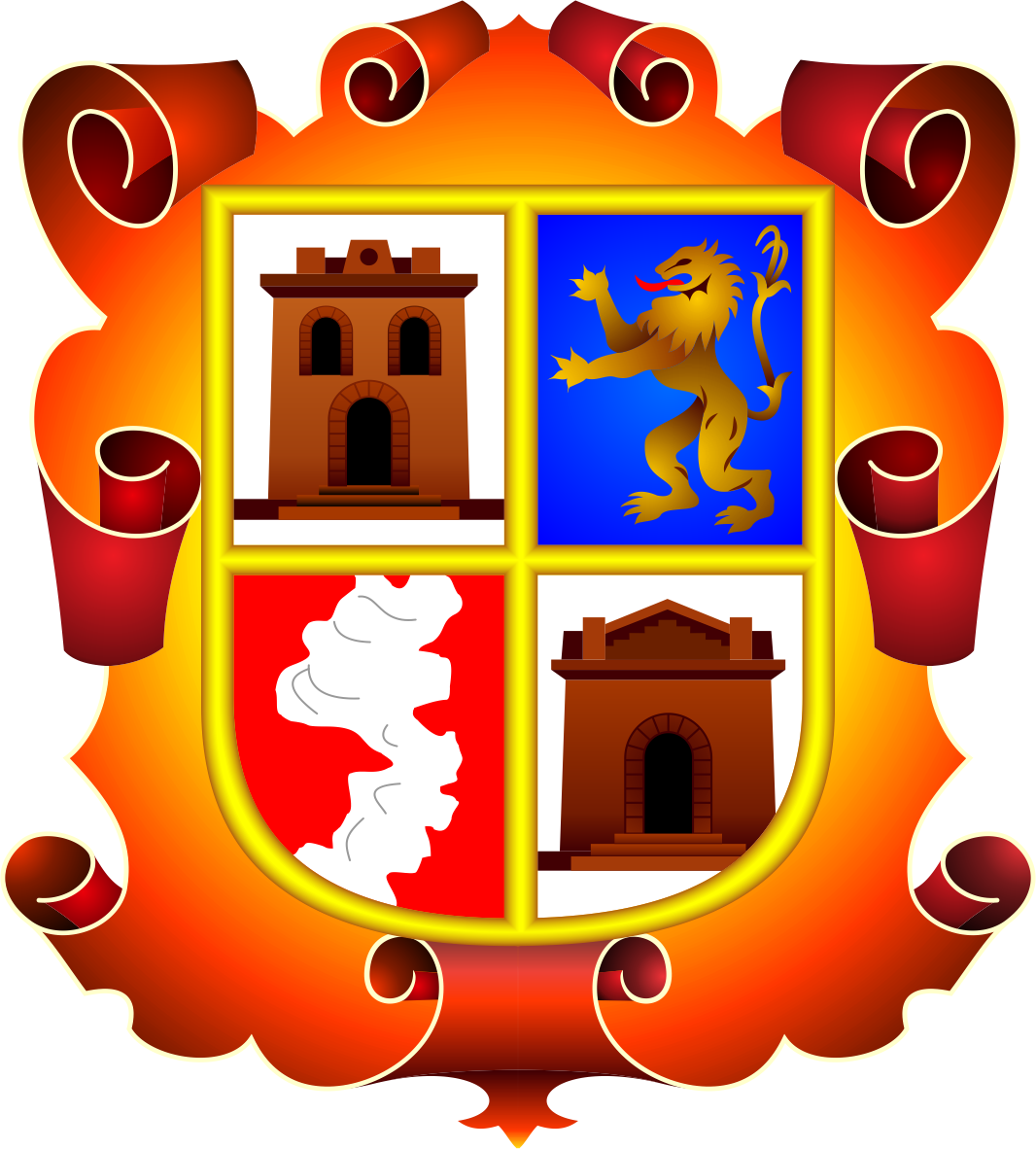
- Flag Coat of arms

- Location within Peru
- Coordinates: 13°39′27″S 73°23′0″W
- Country: Peru
- Region: Apurímac
- Province: Andahuaylas

Government
  - Mayor: Abel Manuel Serna Herrera

Area
  - Total: 370.03 km^{2} (142.87 sq mi)
- Elevation: 2,926 m (9,600 ft)

Population (2017)
  - Total: 42,268
  - Estimate (2015): 63,654
- Time zone: UTC-5 (PET)
  - Summer (DST): UTC-5 (PET)
- Area code: 83
- Website: www.andahuaylas.com

Andahuaylas (Quechua Antawaylla, anta copper, waylla meadow, "copper meadow"), founded in 1533 as San Pedro de Andahuaylas «La Grande de la Corona» (Spanish for "The Grand [city] of the Crown"), is a Peruvian city. It is the capital of the Andahuaylas Province in the Apurímac Region. It is known as the pradera de los celajes (Spanish for "prairie of colored clouds"). Its approximate population of 42,268 inhabitants (2017 census) makes it the largest city in the region.

== History ==
=== Pre-columbian era ===
Around 6,000 BC, the agricultural revolution was established in the Andes. During this period, the 'Antarunas' (sedentary) and the 'Purinrunas' (nomads) entered the scene. The former dedicated themselves to further developing agriculture (potatoes and corn); while the latter specialized in livestock (domestication of camelids).

During the Formative Period, which spans approximately 2000 BC, the area was influenced by the Chavín (sporadically). Paracas and Nazca cultures (especially the latter two due to their geographical proximity). From approximately 300 AD, the entire area fell under the domination of the Wari Empire. With the end of the Wari culture, the Chanka culture. They displaced the Quechuas, who were forced to retreat to the other side of the Pachachaca River. It was later conquered by Pachacuti for the Inca Empire after the Chanka–Inca War.

=== Colonial era ===
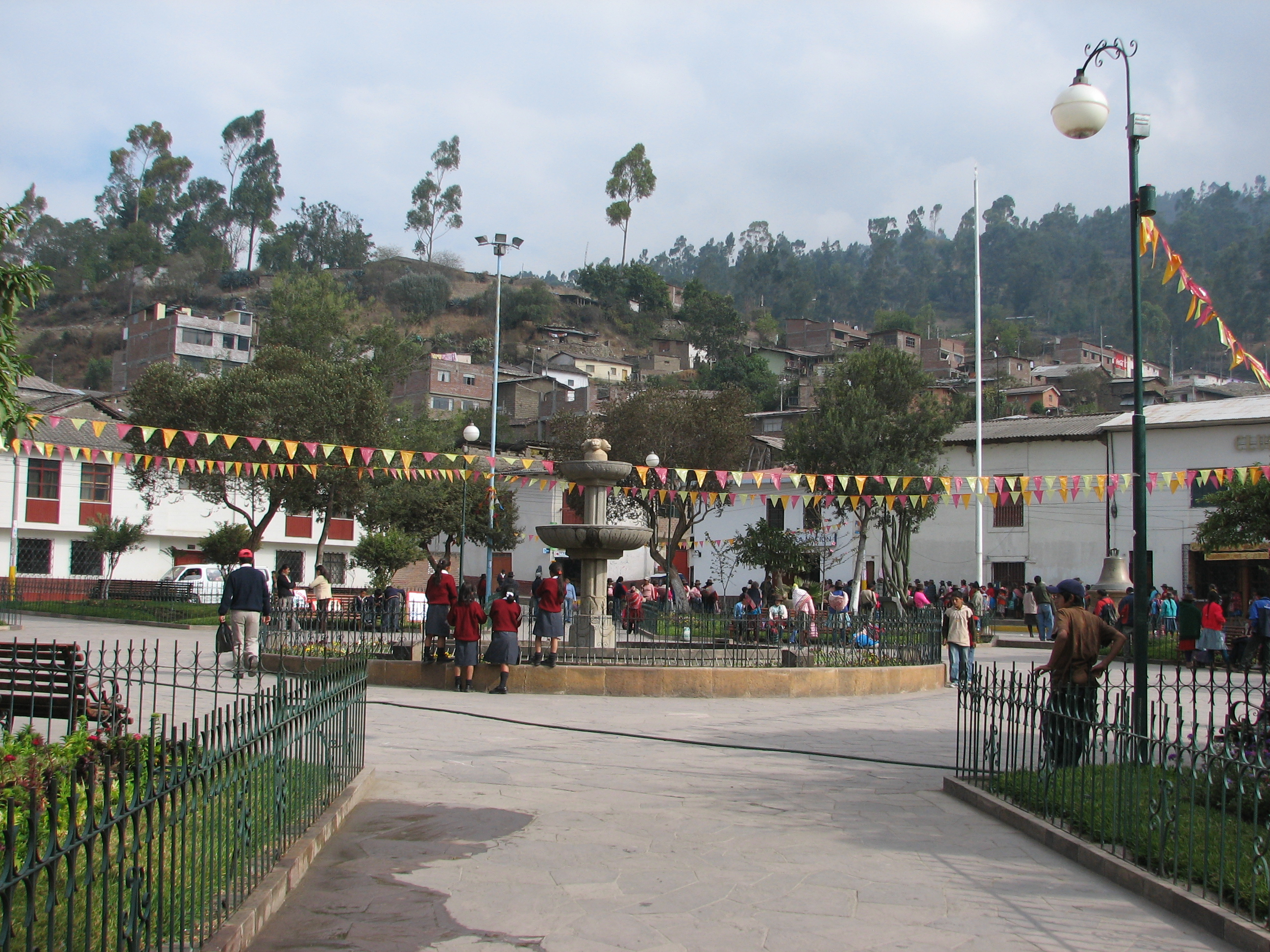
Central Plaza

On November 7, 1533, it was founded by Francisco Pizarro as "San Pedro de Andahuaylas la Grande, de la Corona," according to the chronicles of Pedro Cieza de León. During the founding of Andahuaylas, Pizarro left a wooden cross. Later, construction began on the Cathedral of San Pedro in the main square. According to some chronicles, its construction lasted approximately 40 years. Currently, the wooden cross is located on the side façade facing the main square.

=== Republican era ===
The province of Andahuaylas was created during the Republican era, and the district of Andahuaylas was created at the same time as the province, on June 21, 1825, by decree of the government of Simón Bolívar, forming part of the Department of Cusco. By law of April 28, 1873, it was added to the Department of Apurímac.

== Geography ==
=== Location ===
Andahuyalas is located in the western part of the Apurímac Region. The nearest city is Abancay.

=== Climate ===
Climate data for Andahuaylas, elevation 2,981 m (9,780 ft), (1991–2020)
Month	Jan	Feb	Mar	Apr	May	Jun	Jul	Aug	Sep	Oct	Nov	Dec	Year
Mean daily maximum °C (°F)	20.2 (68.4)	19.8 (67.6)	19.7 (67.5)	20.1 (68.2)	20.4 (68.7)	19.8 (67.6)	19.5 (67.1)	20.0 (68.0)	20.6 (69.1)	21.4 (70.5)	22.3 (72.1)	21.2 (70.2)	20.4 (68.8)
Mean daily minimum °C (°F)	9.4 (48.9)	9.6 (49.3)	9.2 (48.6)	7.7 (45.9)	5.1 (41.2)	4.2 (39.6)	3.7 (38.7)	5.0 (41.0)	7.0 (44.6)	8.0 (46.4)	8.5 (47.3)	9.3 (48.7)	7.2 (45.0)
Average precipitation mm (inches)	131.9 (5.19)	128.5 (5.06)	103.8 (4.09)	38.4 (1.51)	17.0 (0.67)	7.2 (0.28)	11.3 (0.44)	17.9 (0.70)	26.4 (1.04)	48.0 (1.89)	50.1 (1.97)	92.8 (3.65)	673.3 (26.49)
Source: National Meteorology and Hydrology Service of Peru

== Transportation ==
Andahuaylas is served by its own airport, the Andahuaylas Airport. It is the principal airport of the Apurimac region and provides regular flights to Lima.

== Notable people ==
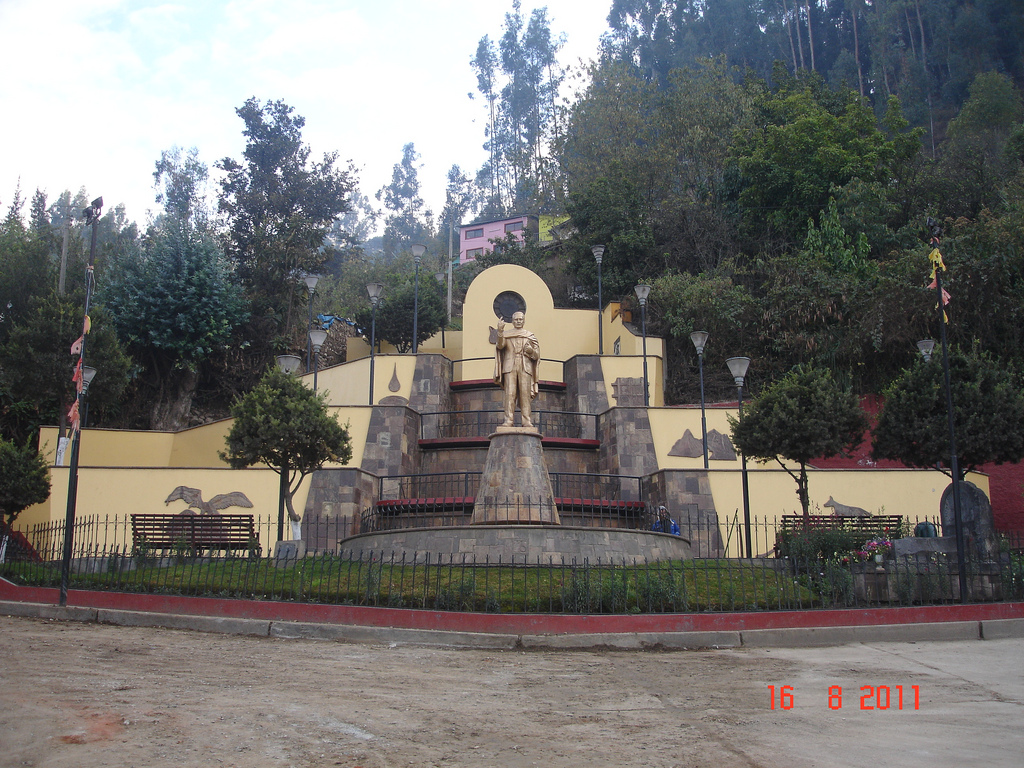
Monument dedicated to José María Arguedas

- José María Arguedas
- David Samanez Ocampo

== See also ==
- Suyt'uqucha
- Andahuaylazo

== Journal of Andahuaylas ==
Diario Opinión
