= 2013 Torneo de Promoción y Reservas =

Torneo de Promoción y Reservas
- Season: 2013
- Champions: Universidad San Martín

The Torneo de Promoción y Reservas is a football tournament in Peru. There are currently 16 clubs in the league. Each team will have in staff to twelve 21-year-old players, three of 19 and three experienced; whenever they be recorded in the club. The team champion in this tournament will offer two points and the runner-up a point of bonus to the respective regular team in the 2013 Torneo Descentralizado.

== Teams ==
Locations of the 2013 Torneo de Promocion y Reserva teams

Team	City	Stadium	Capacity
Alianza Lima	Lima	Alejandro Villanueva	35,000
Cienciano	Cusco	Garcilaso	40,000
Inti Gas	Ayacucho	Ciudad de Cumaná	15,000
José Gálvez	Chimbote	Manuel Rivera Sánchez	25,000
Juan Aurich	Chiclayo	Elías Aguirre	24,500
León de Huánuco	Huánuco	Heraclio Tapia	15,000
Melgar	Arequipa	Virgen de Chapi	40,217
Pacífico	Lima	Iván Elías Moreno	15,000
Real Garcilaso	Cusco	Garcilaso	40,000
Sport Huancayo	Huancayo	Estadio Huancayo	20,000
Sporting Cristal	Lima	Alberto Gallardo	18,000
Unión Comercio	Nueva Cajamarca	IPD de Moyobamba	5,000
Universidad César Vallejo	Trujillo	Mansiche	25,000
Universidad San Martín	Lima	Alberto Gallardo	18,000
UTC	Cajamarca	Héroes de San Ramón	18,000
Universitario	Lima	Monumental	80,093

== League table ==
=== Standings ===
Pos	Team	Pld	W	D	L	GF	GA	GD	Pts	Qualification
1	Universidad San Martín	30	18	6	6	57	24	+33	60	Bonus +2 to 2013 Torneo Descentralizado
2	Alianza Lima	30	16	7	7	46	29	+17	55	Bonus +1 to 2013 Torneo Descentralizado
3	Sporting Cristal	30	16	5	9	53	34	+19	53	
4	Universitario	30	14	10	6	45	23	+22	52	
5	Universidad César Vallejo	30	13	8	9	58	43	+15	47	
6	León de Huánuco	30	12	10	8	32	29	+3	46	
7	Real Garcilaso	30	14	2	14	49	54	−5	44	
8	Cienciano	30	11	8	11	38	41	−3	41	
9	Juan Aurich	30	8	13	9	41	34	+7	37	
10	José Gálvez	30	9	9	12	25	34	−9	36	
11	Unión Comercio	30	9	8	13	33	44	−11	35	
12	Sport Huancayo	30	7	11	12	37	54	−17	32	
13	Melgar	30	8	8	14	25	48	−23	32	
14	Inti Gas	30	6	11	13	29	40	−11	29	
15	Pacífico	30	6	10	14	24	37	−13	28	
16	UTC	30	5	10	15	23	47	−24	25	

Updated to match(es) played on August 2013. Source:
Rules for classification: 1) points; 2) goal difference; 3) number of goals scored.

=== Results ===
Home \ Away	ALI	CIE	MEL	IGD	JG	JA	LEÓ	PAC	RGA	CRI	SHU	UCO	UCV	USM	UTC	UNI
Alianza Lima		0–0	4–0	3–0	0–0	1–0	1–1	2–0	3–0	1–2	4–1	2–1	0–1	3–2	0–0	2–1
Cienciano	0–1		1–1	1–0	1–0	2–0	1–1	4–2	1–2	3–0	1–1	3–1	3–1	1–1	1–1	3–1
Melgar	1–2	2–3		1–1	0–2	1–1	0–0	0–0	3–1	1–0	2–0	0–0	5–1	0–3	4–1	0–0
Inti Gas	3–1	0–1	2–1		0–0	2–2	0–0	1–0	1–2	1–0	1–1	2–0	1–3	0–1	2–0	0–0
José Gálvez	0–1	2–0	0–1	1–0		1–1	0–0	0–2	4–1	0–0	3–0	1–0	3–2	1–1	0–0	1–3
Juan Aurich	2–2	1–1	2–0	0–0	2–0		0–1	0–0	5–0	0–1	5–0	2–2	1–1	0–2	2–1	0–1
León de Huánuco	2–1	3–1	1–0	3–2	0–1	1–1		1–0	2–3	1–2	1–0	3–2	2–2	1–3	2–0	0–2
Pacífico	1–1	4–0	0–1	1–1	1–2	2–4	2–0		1–3	1–0	0–2	0–0	2–1	0–2	1–1	0–3
Real Garcilaso	3–1	1–0	4–0	2–2	4–1	0–1	1–2	2–0		2–0	1–2	6–0	1–2	0–4	1–3	2–1
Sporting Cristal	1–2	3–1	3–0	4–2	1–0	4–2	1–0	1–1	3–0		2–3	9–1	2–0	2–1	3–0	1–2
Sport Huancayo	0–0	2–3	0–0	3–1	0–0	2–1	0–0	1–1	1–1	2–2		1–1	3–1	4–2	1–2	3–3
Unión Comercio	3–0	2–2	1–0	3–0	3–0	2–1	0–0	2–0	0–1	1–2	5–0		1–2	1–0	0–0	0–2
Universidad César Vallejo	1–3	2–0	4–0	2–1	3–0	3–3	1–1	0–1	3–1	2–3	3–2	4–0		1–1	6–0	3–0
Universidad San Martín	0–1	3–0	6–0	3–2	3–1	1–2	1–0	0–0	5–2	3–0	2–1	1–0	1–1		2–0	2–0
UTC	0–3	1–0	0–1	0–0	1–1	0–0	1–2	2–1	1–2	0–0	4–1	0–1	2–2	0–1		0–2
Universitario	3–1	2–0	5–0	1–1	3–0	0–0	0–1	0–0	2–0	1–1	2–0	0–0	0–0	0–0	5–2	

Updated to match(es) played on 2013. Source: ADFP.org.pe
Legend: Blue = home team win; Yellow = draw; Red = away team win.
