= 2020 Torneo de Promoción y Reserva =

Torneo de Promoción y Reservas
- Season: 2020

The Torneo de Promoción y Reservas was a football tournament in Peru. There are currently 20 clubs in the league. Each team will have a roster of twelve 21-year-old players, three 19-year-olds, and three older reinforcements; whenever they be recorded in the club. The tournament will offer the champion two bonus points and the runner-up one bonus point to the respective regular teams in the 2020 Liga 1.

The tournament was canceled due to the COVID-19 pandemic.

== Teams ==
=== Stadia and locations ===
Locations of the 2020 Liga 1 teams

Team	City	Stadium	Capacity
Academia Cantolao	Callao	Miguel Grau	15,000
Alianza Lima	Lima	Alejandro Villanueva	35,000
Alianza Universidad	Huánuco	Heraclio Tapia	15,000
Atlético Grau	Piura	Campeones del 36	12,000
Ayacucho	Ayacucho	Ciudad de Cumaná	15,000
Binacional	Juliaca	Guillermo Briceño Rosamedina	20,030
Carlos A. Mannucci	Trujillo	Mansiche	25,000
Carlos Stein	Chiclayo	Francisco Mendoza Pizarro	7,000
Cienciano	Cusco	Garcilaso	42,056
Cusco	Cusco	Túpac Amaru	15,000
Deportivo Llacuabamba	Pataz	Germán Contreras Jara	6,300
Deportivo Municipal	Huacho	Segundo Aranda Torres	8,000
Melgar	Arequipa	Virgen de Chapi	60,000
Sport Boys	Callao	Miguel Grau	17,000
Sport Huancayo	Huancayo	Estadio Huancayo	20,000
Sporting Cristal	Lima	Alberto Gallardo	18,000
Universidad César Vallejo	Trujillo	Mansiche	25,000
Universidad San Martín	Lima	Alberto Gallardo	18,000
Universitario	Lima	Monumental	80,093
UTC	Cajamarca	Héroes de San Ramón	18,000

== League table ==
=== Standings ===
Pos	Team	Pld	W	D	L	GF	GA	GD	Pts	Qualification
1	Melgar	5	5	0	0	19	5	+14	15	Bonus +2 to 2020 Liga 1
2	Ayacucho	6	3	3	0	7	4	+3	12	Bonus +1 to 2020 Liga 1
3	Alianza Lima	6	3	2	1	9	6	+3	11	
4	Atlético Grau	6	3	2	1	8	8	0	11	
5	Sporting Cristal	4	3	1	0	19	4	+15	10	
6	Carlos A. Mannucci	6	3	1	2	9	6	+3	10	
7	Cienciano	6	3	1	2	7	5	+2	10	
8	Alianza Universidad	6	3	0	3	9	5	+4	9	
9	Sport Boys	6	2	3	1	10	7	+3	9	
10	Sport Huancayo	5	3	0	2	6	4	+2	9	
11	Universitario	6	2	3	1	10	9	+1	9	
12	Binacional	6	2	2	2	7	9	−2	8	
13	Universidad César Vallejo	6	2	1	3	6	12	−6	7	
14	Deportivo Llacuabamba	6	2	0	4	5	9	−4	6	
15	Carlos Stein	6	1	3	2	12	18	−6	6	
16	UTC	6	1	3	2	3	9	−6	6	
17	Deportivo Municipal	6	1	2	3	2	5	−3	5	
18	Universidad San Martín	6	1	1	4	4	8	−4	4	
19	Cusco	6	0	1	5	5	14	−9	1	
20	Academia Cantolao	6	0	1	5	1	11	−10	1	

Updated to match(es) played on unknown. Source: ADFP, Soccerway
Rules for classification: 1) Points; 2) Goal difference; 3) Goals for; 4) Fair play points; 5) Drawing of lots; 6) Play-off (only if needed to decide first place).
If two teams are tied in points for first place: 2) Play-off.

=== Results ===
Home \ Away	ALI	AUH	CAG	AYA	BIN	CAN	CAM	STE	CIE	LLA	MUN	MEL	CUS	SBA	SHU	CRI	USM	UCV	UNI	UTC
Alianza Lima		2–1	1–1	—	—	—	—	—	—	—	2–0	—	—	—	—	—	—	—	—	—
Alianza Universidad	—		—	—	—	—	—	3–0	2–0	2–0	—	—	—	—	—	—	—	—	—	—
Atlético Grau	—	—		—	—	—	—	—	—	—	—	—	—	2–1	—	—	1–0	3–2	—	—
Ayacucho	1–0	1–0	—		—	—	—	—	—	—	—	—	—	2–2	—	—	—	—	—	—
Binacional	—	—	—	—		—	—	—	—	—	—	0–2	—	2–2	—	—	—	—	—	2–0
Academia Cantolao	—	—	1–1	0–1	—		—	—	0–2	—	—	—	—	—	—	—	—	—	—	—
Carlos A. Mannucci	2–3	—	—	—	—	2–0		—	2–0	—	—	—	—	—	—	—	—	—	—	—
Carlos Stein	—	—	—	—	4–1	—	2–2		—	—	—	—	—	—	—	—	—	—	—	—
Cienciano	—	—	—	1–1	—	—	—	—		2–0	—	—		—	—	—	2–0	—	—	—
Deportivo Llacuabamba	—	—	—	—	—	3–0	—	—	—		—	—	—	—	—	—	2–1	—	—	0–1
Deportivo Municipal	—	—	—	—	—	2–0	—	0–0	—	—		—	—	—	—	—	—	—	—	0–0
Melgar	—	—	—	—	—	—	—	—	—	—	—		—	—	3–0	—	—	—	4–2	—
Cusco	—	—	—	—	1–2	—	—	—	—	—	—	2–4		—	—	—	—	1–2	—	—
Sport Boys	—	—	—	—	—	—	1–0	—	—	3–0	—	—	—		—	—	—	—	1–1	—
Sport Huancayo	—	—	3–0	—	—	—	—	—	—	—	2–0	—	1–0	—		—	—	—	—	—
Sporting Cristal	—	—	—	—	—	—	—	9–3	—	—	—	—	4–0	—	—		—	—	—	—
Universidad San Martín	—	2–1	—	1–1	—	—	0–1	—	—	—	—	—	—	—	—	—		—	—	—
Universidad César Vallejo	—	—	—	—	0–0	—	1–0	—	—	—	—	—	—	—	—	1–6	—		—	—
Universitario	1–1	—	—	—	—	—	—	3–3	—	—	—	—	—	—	1–0	—	—	2–0		—
UTC	—	—	—	—	—	—	—	—	—	—	—	1–6	1–1	—	—	0–0	—	—	—	

Source: ADFP, Soccerway
Legend: Blue = home team win; Yellow = draw; Red = away team win.

== See also ==
- 2020 Liga 1
