= 2017 Torneo de Promoción y Reservas =

Torneo de Promoción y Reservas
- Season: 2017
- Champions: Sport Huancayo
- U-20 Copa Libertadores: Sport Huancayo

The Torneo de Promoción y Reservas is a football tournament in Peru. There are currently 16 clubs in the league. Each team will have a roster of twelve 21-year-old players, three 19-year-olds, and three older reinforcements; whenever they be recorded in the club. The tournament will offer the champion two bonus points and the runner-up one bonus point to the respective regular teams in the 2017 Torneo Descentralizado.

== Teams ==
=== Stadia and locations ===
Locations of the 2017 Torneo de Promoción y Reserva teams

Team	City	Stadium	Capacity
Academia Cantolao	Callao	Miguel Grau	15,000
Alianza Atlético	Sullana	Melanio Colona	5,000
Alianza Lima	Lima	Alejandro Villanueva	35,000
Ayacucho	Ayacucho	Ciudad de Cumaná	15,000
Comerciantes Unidos	Cutervo	Juan Maldonado Gamarra	8,000
Deportivo Municipal	Lima	Iván Elías Moreno	10,000
Juan Aurich	Chiclayo	Elías Aguirre	24,500
Melgar	Arequipa	Virgen de Chapi	60,000
Real Garcilaso	Cusco	Estadio Garcilaso	42,056
Sport Huancayo	Huancayo	Estadio Huancayo	20,000
Sport Rosario	Huaraz	Rosas Pampa	18,000
Sporting Cristal	Lima	Alberto Gallardo	18,000
Unión Comercio	Nueva Cajamarca	IPD de Moyobamba	7,500
Universidad San Martín	Callao	Miguel Grau	17,000
UTC	Cajamarca	Héroes de San Ramón	18,000
Universitario	Lima	Monumental	80,093

== Torneo de Verano ==
=== Group A ===
Pos	Team	Pld	W	D	L	GF	GA	GD	Pts	CRI	SRO	USM	AAS	AYA	MEL	CAN	UCO
1	Sporting Cristal	14	11	2	1	42	12	+30	35		8–1	1–1	3–1	6–2	2–0	8–1	1–0
2	Sport Rosario	14	6	4	4	23	30	−7	22	0–1		2–1	0–0	2–2	2–1	1–0	1–2
3	Universidad San Martín	14	6	3	5	23	22	+1	21	1–4	1–2		2–2	0–1	1–1	4–2	3–2
4	Alianza Atlético	14	3	7	4	23	23	0	16	0–2	6–1	1–4		1–1	2–1	3–3	3–1
5	Ayacucho	14	3	7	4	21	24	−3	16	1–2	3–3	1–2	1–1		2–3	2–0	2–2
6	Melgar	14	4	3	7	17	22	−5	15	0–1	1–1	0–1	1–0	0–0		2–1	4–3
7	Academia Cantolao	14	4	2	8	18	32	−14	14	2–1	3–5	0–2	1–1	0–1	1–0		1–0
8	Unión Comercio	14	3	4	7	27	29	−2	13	2–2	1–2	3–0	2–2	2–2	5–3	2–3	

Updated to match(es) played on May 2017. Source: ADFP
Rules for classification: 1) points; 2) goal difference; 3) goals scored; 4) draw.

=== Group B ===
Pos	Team	Pld	W	D	L	GF	GA	GD	Pts	SHU	JA	UNI	RGA	ALI	UTC	MUN	COM
1	Sport Huancayo	14	9	2	3	32	14	+18	29		2–1	5–1	1–3	5–0	5–0	2–1	2–0
2	Juan Aurich	14	8	4	2	26	12	+14	28	0–0		1–0	2–0	1–1	6–1	3–2	1–1
3	Universitario	14	8	0	6	18	17	+1	24	1–2	0–3		2–0	0–1	1–0	2–0	3–1
4	Real Garcilaso	14	6	3	5	19	17	+2	21	1–1	1–2	1–0		2–2	3–2	2–0	4–0
5	Alianza Lima	14	4	5	5	15	20	−5	17	1–0	0–2	0–1	1–2		1–0	1–1	2–0
6	UTC	14	4	3	7	17	26	−9	15	3–5	0–0	1–2	3–0	2–2		0–0	2–0
7	Deportivo Municipal	14	2	5	7	13	21	−8	11	1–0	3–1	1–2	0–0	2–2	0–1		0–3
8	Comerciantes Unidos	14	3	2	9	14	27	−13	11	1–2	1–3	1–3	1–0	2–1	1–2	2–2	

Updated to match(es) played on 14 May 2017. Source: ADFP
Rules for classification: 1) points; 2) goal difference; 3) goals scored; 4) draw.

=== Aggregate table ===
Pos	Team	Pld	W	D	L	GF	GA	GD	Pts	Qualification
1	Sporting Cristal	14	11	2	1	42	12	+30	35	Bonus +2 to Torneo Apertura (Reserva)
2	Sport Huancayo	14	9	2	3	32	14	+18	29	Bonus +1 to Torneo Apertura (Reserva)
3	Juan Aurich	14	8	4	2	26	12	+14	28	
4	Universitario	14	8	0	6	18	17	+1	24	
5	Sport Rosario	14	6	4	4	23	30	−7	22	
6	Real Garcilaso	14	6	3	5	19	17	+2	21	
7	Universidad San Martín	14	6	3	5	23	22	+1	21	
8	Alianza Lima	14	4	5	5	15	20	−5	17	
9	Alianza Atlético	14	3	7	4	23	23	0	16	
10	Ayacucho	14	3	7	4	21	24	−3	16	
11	Melgar	14	4	3	7	17	22	−5	15	
12	UTC	14	4	3	7	17	26	−9	15	
13	Academia Cantolao	14	4	2	8	18	32	−14	14	
14	Unión Comercio	14	3	4	7	27	29	−2	13	
15	Deportivo Municipal	14	2	5	7	13	21	−8	11	
16	Comerciantes Unidos	14	3	2	9	14	27	−13	11	

Updated to match(es) played on May 2017. Source: ADFP
Rules for classification: 1) points; 2) goal difference; 3) goals scored; 4) draw.

== Torneo Descentralizado ==
=== Torneo Apertura ===
==== Standings ====
Pos	Team	Pld	W	D	L	GF	GA	GD	Pts
1	Sporting Cristal (Note: Sporting Cristal was awarded 2 points for finishing as Torneo de Verano winner.)	15	11	4	0	40	15	+25	39
2	Sport Huancayo (Note: Sport Huancayo was awarded 1 point for finishing as Torneo de Verano runners-up.)	15	9	3	3	31	16	+15	31
3	Academia Cantolao	15	10	1	4	27	13	+14	31
4	Unión Comercio	15	6	5	4	23	21	+2	23
5	Sport Rosario	15	6	4	5	20	19	+1	22
6	Real Garcilaso	15	5	6	4	21	16	+5	21
7	Universidad San Martín	15	5	6	4	24	21	+3	21
8	Melgar	15	5	5	5	29	25	+4	20
9	Juan Aurich	15	4	7	4	27	24	+3	19
10	Deportivo Municipal	15	5	4	6	17	21	−4	19
11	UTC	15	5	3	7	22	34	−12	18
12	Universitario	15	5	2	8	29	26	+3	17
13	Ayacucho	15	5	0	10	19	39	−20	15
14	Alianza Lima	15	3	5	7	21	25	−4	14
15	Alianza Atlético	15	3	4	8	17	27	−10	13
16	Comerciantes Unidos	15	3	1	11	15	40	−25	10

Source: ADFP
Rules for classification: 1) points; 2) goal difference; 3) goals scored; 4) draw.

==== Results ====
Home \ Away	AAS	ALI	AYA	CAN	COM	JA	MEL	MUN	RGA	SHU	SRO	CRI	UCO	USM	UTC	UNI
Alianza Atlético		1–1				1–1	2–4			1–0		0–2	0–1	2–1	4–1	
Alianza Lima			2–1	1–2		2–2			1–1	1–3	1–2			1–2		
Ayacucho	2–1			0–2	7–0	3–1	2–1		0–1	1–5	1–0					
Academia Cantolao	3–1				1–0		3–0	2–0	1–0			1–2	3–0		3–0	
Comerciantes Unidos	3–0	0–2						2–1				2–4	1–1	2–3	1–2	
Juan Aurich				2–2	6–0		2–2	0–0	0–3		4–1					1–0
Melgar		1–1			0–1			4–1				1–1	1–2	2–2	6–0	
Deportivo Municipal	2–0	1–0	1–0							0–2			3–1	0–1	2–2	
Real Garcilaso	2–0				3–1		1–2	1–1				1–1	3–1		2–2	
Sport Huancayo				2–0	4–1	2–1	2–2		1–1		2–0					2–1
Sport Rosario	3–2			2–0	3–1		0–2	1–1	3–1			0–1				2–0
Sporting Cristal		3–2	5–1			2–2		5–2		3–2				1–1	5–0	2–0
Unión Comercio		1–0	6–1			2–0				1–1	1–1	0–3		1–1		3–3
Universidad San Martín			4–0	2–1		2–2			1–1	1–2	1–1					2–4
UTC		2–2	5–0			2–3				2–1	1–2		0–2	1–0		2–1
Universitario	2–2	3–4	5–0	1–3	3–0		5–1	0–2	1–0							

Legend: Blue = home team win; Yellow = draw; Red = away team win.

=== Torneo Clausura ===
==== Standings ====
Pos	Team	Pld	W	D	L	GF	GA	GD	Pts
1	Sport Huancayo	15	11	3	1	36	9	+27	36
2	Melgar	15	9	3	3	32	13	+19	30
3	Sporting Cristal	15	8	4	3	35	19	+16	28
4	Universitario	15	6	6	3	23	15	+8	24
5	Alianza Lima	15	7	3	5	30	27	+3	24
6	Unión Comercio	15	7	2	6	25	20	+5	23
7	Universidad San Martín	15	7	1	7	29	35	−6	22
8	Deportivo Municipal	15	5	5	5	22	21	+1	20
9	Ayacucho	15	5	5	5	16	19	−3	20
10	Alianza Atlético	15	6	2	7	26	35	−9	20
11	Academia Cantolao	15	4	6	5	26	28	−2	18
12	Juan Aurich	15	5	2	8	17	25	−8	17
13	Comerciantes Unidos	15	5	1	9	22	38	−16	16
14	Real Garcilaso	15	3	4	8	22	28	−6	13
15	Sport Rosario	15	4	0	11	20	34	−14	12
16	UTC	15	3	3	9	15	30	−15	12

Source: ADFP
Rules for classification: 1) points; 2) goal difference; 3) goals scored; 4) draw.

==== Results ====
Home \ Away	AAS	ALI	AYA	CAN	COM	JA	MEL	MUN	RGA	SHU	SRO	CRI	UCO	USM	UTC	UNI
Alianza Atlético			3–1	2–1	3–2			1–1	3–0		1–0					3–3
Alianza Lima	2–1				3–1		0–1	2–2				2–1	2–1		4–0	0–1
Ayacucho		5–1						1–0				0–0	3–0	1–0	0–0	0–0
Academia Cantolao		3–3	2–0			2–1				0–1	2–0			4–3		2–2
Comerciantes Unidos			2–2	4–2		2–4	2–1		3–1	1–5	2–1					1–0
Juan Aurich	1–3	1–2	0–0							0–2		0–2	1–0	4–0	2–0	
Melgar	2–1		6–0	2–1		4–0			4–0	0–0	4–2					1–0
Deportivo Municipal				1–1	3–0	0–1	3–2		2–1		3–1	1–2				2–2
Real Garcilaso		2–2	0–2	1–1		4–1				1–1	4–0			6–1		0–0
Sport Huancayo	5–2	2–1	2–0					4–0				0–0	5–0	3–1	2–1	
Sport Rosario		4–1	3–1			3–0				1–4			0–2	1–3	2–1	
Sporting Cristal	7–0			5–2	4–1		1–1		3–1		3–1		3–2			
Unión Comercio	4–0			1–1	3–0		2–1	1–1	4–1						3–1	
Universidad San Martín	3–1	2–5			2–1		1–1	2–1				4–2	0–2		3–0	
UTC	3–2			2–2	4–0		0–2	0–2	1–0			2–2				
Universitario						1–1				1–0	3–1	2–0	1–0	3–4	4–0	

Legend: Blue = home team win; Yellow = draw; Red = away team win.

=== Aggregate table ===
Pos	Team	Pld	W	D	L	GF	GA	GD	Pts	Qualification
1	Sport Huancayo	30	20	6	4	67	25	+42	67 (Note: Sport Huancayo were awarded 1 point for 2017 Torneo de Verano runner-up.)	Bonus +2 to 2017 Torneo Descentralizado
2	Sporting Cristal	30	19	8	3	74	34	+40	67 (Note: Sporting Cristal were awarded 2 points for 2017 Torneo de Verano champion.)	Bonus +1 to 2017 Torneo Descentralizado
3	Melgar	30	15	8	7	63	36	+27	53	
4	Academia Cantolao	30	14	7	9	53	41	+12	49	
5	Unión Comercio	30	12	7	11	47	44	+3	43	
6	Universidad San Martín	30	12	7	11	53	56	−3	43	
7	Universitario	30	11	8	11	53	42	+11	41	
8	Deportivo Municipal	30	10	9	11	39	42	−3	39	
9	Alianza Lima	30	10	8	12	51	52	−1	38	
10	Juan Aurich	30	9	9	12	44	49	−5	36	
11	Sport Rosario	30	11	3	16	42	53	−11	36	
12	Ayacucho	30	10	5	15	35	58	−23	35	
13	Real Garcilaso	30	8	10	12	43	43	0	34	
14	Alianza Atlético	30	9	5	16	43	63	−20	32	
15	UTC	30	8	6	16	38	65	−27	30	
16	Comerciantes Unidos	30	8	2	20	37	79	−42	26	

Updated to match(es) played on unknown. Source: ADFP

== See also ==
- 2017 Torneo Descentralizado
