= 2022 Sporting Cristal season =

Football league season

Sporting Cristal
2022 season
- Stadium: Alberto Gallardo, Lima
- Liga 1: Tornel Apertura: Third (3°); Tornel Clausura: Second (2°); Aggregate Table: First (1°); Play-offs: Third; Third National (3°)
- Copa Bicentenario: Suspended for COVID-19
- Copa Libertadores: Group stage
Home colours	Away colours	Third colours

The 2022 Sporting Cristal season were the Sixty-Seventh (67.º) of the club from its foundation in 1955, Sixty-Seven (67) participations consecutives in the top-flight of Peruvian Primera División (of 106 Editions) with denomination last Liga 1. In Previous Season the club qualified as Runners-up National 2nd Place of the 2020 Liga 1.

Sporting Cristal were a of nineteen (19) clubs in the Fourth edition (4.º) Liga 1, the competition most important of the Peruvian football. The club played the Peruvian Primera División and Copa Libertadores for Thirty-Seventh (37th) Time.

== Liga 1 ==
=== Torneo Apertura ===
Pos	Team	Pld	W	D	L	GF	GA	GD	Pts
2	Sport Huancayo	18	12	4	2	35	18	+17	40
3	Sporting Cristal	18	11	5	2	35	20	+15	38
3	Alianza Lima	18	10	3	5	28	16	+12	33

== See also ==
- Club Sporting Cristal
- 2022 Liga 1
- 2022 Torneo de Promoción y Reservas
