= 2022 Torneo de Promoción y Reservas =

Torneo de Promoción y Reservas
- Season: 2022
- Champions: Alianza Lima
- U-20 Copa Libertadores: Alianza Lima

The Torneo de Promoción y Reservas was a football tournament in Peru. There are currently 32 clubs in the league. Each team will have a roster of twelve 21-year-old players, three 19-year-olds, and three older reinforcements; whenever they be recorded in the club. The tournament will offer the champion two bonus points and the runner-up one bonus point to the respective regular teams in the 2022 Liga 1 or 2022 Liga 2.

== Teams ==
=== Stadia and locations ===
Locations of the 2022 Liga 1 and Liga 2 teams

| Team | City | Stadium | Capacity |
Liga 1
| Academia Cantolao | Callao | Miguel Grau | 17,000 |
| ADT | Tarma | Huancayo | 20,000 |
| Alianza Atlético | Sullana | Melanio Coloma | 4,000 |
| Alianza Lima | Lima | Alejandro Villanueva | 35,000 |
| Atlético Grau | Piura | Municipal de Bernal | 7,000 |
| Ayacucho | Ayacucho | Ciudad de Cumaná | 15,000 |
| Binacional | Juliaca | Guillermo Briceño Rosamedina | 20,030 |
| Carlos A. Mannucci | Trujillo | Mansiche | 25,000 |
| Carlos Stein | Lambayeque | César Flores Marigorda | 7,000 |
| Cienciano | Cusco | Garcilaso | 42,056 |
| Deportivo Municipal | Lima | Iván Elías Moreno | 10,000 |
| Melgar | Arequipa | Virgen de Chapi | 60,000 |
| Sport Boys | Callao | Miguel Grau | 17,000 |
| Sport Huancayo | Huancayo | Huancayo | 20,000 |
| Sporting Cristal | Lima | Alberto Gallardo | 11,600 |
| Universidad César Vallejo | Trujillo | Mansiche | 25,000 |
| Universidad San Martín | Lima | Universidad San Marcos | 32,000 |
| Universitario | Lima | Monumental | 80,093 |
| UTC | Cajamarca | Héroes de San Ramón | 18,000 |
Liga 2
| Alfonso Ugarte | Puno | Guillermo Briceño Rosamedina | 20,030 |
| Alianza Universidad | Huánuco | Heraclio Tapia | 25,000 |
| Comerciantes Unidos | Cutervo | Juan Maldonado Gamarra | 12,000 |
| Cusco | Cusco | Garcilaso | 42,056 |
| Deportivo Coopsol | San Vicente de Cañete | Roberto Yáñez | 5,000 |
| Deportivo Llacuabamba | Cajamarca | Héroes de San Ramón | 18,000 |
| Juan Aurich | Chiclayo | Municipal de la Juventud | 2,000 |
| Los Chankas | Andahuaylas | Monumental de Condebamba | 10,000 |
| Pirata | Olmos | Francisco Mendoza Pizarro | 5,000 |
| Santos | Nasca | José Picasso Peratta | 8,000 |
| Sport Chavelines | Pacasmayo | Carlos A. Olivares | 2,000 |
| Unión Comercio | Nueva Cajamarca | IPD de Moyobamba | 12,000 |
| Unión Huaral | Huaral | Julio Lores Colan | 10,000 |

== Group stage ==
=== Group A (North) ===
| Pos | Team | Pld | W | D | L | GF | GA | GD | Pts | Qualification | UCV | CST | AAS | CAG | CAM | PIR | JA | CHA |
|---|---|---|---|---|---|---|---|---|---|---|---|---|---|---|---|---|---|---|
| 1 | Universidad César Vallejo | 14 | 11 | 3 | 0 | 39 | 10 | +29 | 36 | Advance to Championship play-offs | | 2–1 | 3–1 | 2–1 | 1–1 | 6–1 | 3–0 | 3–0 |
| 2 | Carlos Stein | 14 | 8 | 3 | 3 | 26 | 13 | +13 | 27 | Advance to Championship play-offs | 2–2 | | 0–3 | 2–2 | 2–1 | 0–0 | 3–0 | 3–0 |
| 3 | Alianza Atlético | 14 | 6 | 4 | 4 | 32 | 27 | +5 | 22 | | 2–2 | 2–5 | | 1–0 | 4–2 | 3–3 | 2–0 | 3–0 |
| 4 | Atlético Grau | 14 | 6 | 4 | 4 | 27 | 24 | +3 | 22 | | 0–3 | 0–4 | 4–1 | | 2–2 | 3–2 | 3–2 | 3–0 |
| 5 | Carlos A. Mannucci | 14 | 5 | 6 | 3 | 25 | 18 | +7 | 21 | | 1–2 | 1–0 | 3–1 | 2–2 | | 2–2 | 3–1 | 3–0 |
| 6 | Pirata | 14 | 3 | 5 | 6 | 21 | 25 | −4 | 14 | | 0–2 | 0–1 | 2–2 | 2–3 | 1–1 | | 0–2 | 3–0 |
| 7 | Juan Aurich | 14 | 3 | 3 | 8 | 16 | 27 | −11 | 12 | | 1–6 | 0–1 | 3–3 | 1–1 | 0–0 | 0–2 | | 3–0 |
| 8 | Sport Chavelines (Note: Sport Chavelines withdrew from the competition after the matchday 7 due to financial matters. Consequently, all their matches were declared lost with a 3–0 score against. Sport Chavelines matches played before their withdrawal were as follows: Sport Chavelines 0–2 Carlos Stein, Carlos A. Mannucci 5–0 Sport Chavelines, Sport Chavelines 0–1 Pirata, Alianza Atlético 2–1 Sport Chavelines, Sport Chavelines 0–3 Universidad César Vallejo, Sport Chavelines 1–0 Atlético Grau, Juan Aurich 2–0 Sport Chavelines.) | 14 | 0 | 0 | 14 | 0 | 42 | −42 | 0 | Withdrew | 0–3 | 0–3 | 0–3 | 0–3 | 0–3 | 0–3 | 0–3 | |

Source: Liga 1
Legend: Blue = home team win; Yellow = draw; Red = away team win.
Rules for classification: 1) Points; 2) Goal difference; 3) Goals for; 4) Fair play points; 5) Drawing of lots; 6) Play-off (only if needed to decide first place).
If two teams are tied in points for first place: 2) Play-off.

=== Group B (Lima & Callao) ===
| Pos | Team | Pld | W | D | L | GF | GA | GD | Pts | Qualification | UNI | ALI | CRI | SBA | MUN | CAN | USM | COO |
|---|---|---|---|---|---|---|---|---|---|---|---|---|---|---|---|---|---|---|
| 1 | Universitario | 14 | 11 | 2 | 1 | 31 | 13 | +18 | 35 | Advance to Championship play-offs | | 2–1 | 2–1 | 1–4 | 2–1 | 3–1 | 2–1 | 3–0 |
| 2 | Alianza Lima | 14 | 8 | 2 | 4 | 16 | 9 | +7 | 26 | Advance to Championship play-offs | 0–3 | | 0–0 | 2–0 | 1–0 | 2–0 | 3–0 | 0–1 |
| 3 | Sporting Cristal | 14 | 7 | 4 | 3 | 22 | 15 | +7 | 25 | | 0–0 | 1–2 | | 3–2 | 0–0 | 3–3 | 2–0 | 2–0 |
| 4 | Sport Boys | 14 | 8 | 0 | 6 | 30 | 21 | +9 | 24 | | 1–2 | 0–2 | 1–0 | | 5–0 | 3–2 | 3–0 | 1–0 |
| 5 | Deportivo Municipal | 14 | 5 | 2 | 7 | 15 | 20 | −5 | 17 | | 1–3 | 0–0 | 0–2 | 3–0 | | 1–0 | 3–2 | 1–0 |
| 6 | Academia Cantolao | 14 | 4 | 4 | 6 | 21 | 26 | −5 | 16 | | 1–1 | 1–0 | 1–2 | 3–2 | 2–1 | | 1–1 | 4–3 |
| 7 | Universidad San Martín | 14 | 2 | 3 | 9 | 19 | 35 | −16 | 9 | | 1–5 | 1–2 | 2–3 | 2–4 | 2–1 | 2–2 | | 2–2 |
| 8 | Deportivo Coopsol | 14 | 2 | 1 | 11 | 14 | 29 | −15 | 7 | | 0–2 | 0–1 | 2–3 | 1–4 | 1–3 | 2–0 | 2–3 | |

Source: Liga 1
Legend: Blue = home team win; Yellow = draw; Red = away team win.
Rules for classification: 1) Points; 2) Goal difference; 3) Goals for; 4) Fair play points; 5) Drawing of lots; 6) Play-off (only if needed to decide first place).
If two teams are tied in points for first place: 2) Play-off.

=== Group C (South) ===
| Pos | Team | Pld | W | D | L | GF | GA | GD | Pts | Qualification | MEL | AYA | CIE | SAN | CUS | BIN | LCH | AUG |
|---|---|---|---|---|---|---|---|---|---|---|---|---|---|---|---|---|---|---|
| 1 | Melgar | 14 | 11 | 3 | 0 | 52 | 12 | +40 | 36 | Advance to Championship play-offs | | 2–2 | 4–0 | 8–0 | 5–1 | 6–2 | 6–0 | 6–0 |
| 2 | Ayacucho | 14 | 9 | 3 | 2 | 38 | 13 | +25 | 30 | Advance to Championship play-offs | 2–2 | | 0–3 (Note: Match awarded 0–3 to Cienciano due to a breach of regulations by Ayacucho (absence of doctor on the bench). The match had been suspended at half time with a 0–0 score.) | 2–1 | 6–0 | 3–0 | 3–2 | 3–0 |
| 3 | Cienciano | 14 | 9 | 3 | 2 | 32 | 14 | +18 | 30 | | 1–1 | 1–0 | | 3–0 | 1–1 | 4–1 | 4–1 | 3–0 |
| 4 | Santos | 14 | 5 | 3 | 6 | 11 | 20 | −9 | 18 | | 1–3 | 1–1 | 2–1 | | 2–0 | 1–0 | 2–0 | 1–0 |
| 5 | Cusco | 14 | 5 | 1 | 8 | 19 | 40 | −21 | 16 | | 1–2 | 1–9 | 1–2 | 1–0 | | 3–2 | 1–0 | 3–1 |
| 6 | Binacional | 14 | 3 | 3 | 8 | 22 | 33 | −11 | 12 | | 1–4 | 0–2 | 3–3 | 0–0 | 6–3 | | 2–3 | 1–1 |
| 7 | Los Chankas | 14 | 3 | 1 | 10 | 11 | 28 | −17 | 10 | | 1–2 | 0–3 | 0–3 | 0–0 | 2–0 | 0–1 | | 2–0 |
| 8 | Alfonso Ugarte | 14 | 2 | 1 | 11 | 6 | 31 | −25 | 7 | | 0–1 | 0–2 | 0–3 | 1–0 | 2–3 | 0–3 | 1–0 | |

Source: Liga 1
Legend: Blue = home team win; Yellow = draw; Red = away team win.
Rules for classification: 1) Points; 2) Goal difference; 3) Goals for; 4) Fair play points; 5) Drawing of lots; 6) Play-off (only if needed to decide first place).
If two teams are tied in points for first place: 2) Play-off.

=== Group D (Center) ===
| Pos | Team | Pld | W | D | L | GF | GA | GD | Pts | Qualification | SHU | UTC | ADT | AUH | LLA | UCO | UHU | COM |
|---|---|---|---|---|---|---|---|---|---|---|---|---|---|---|---|---|---|---|
| 1 | Sport Huancayo | 14 | 12 | 1 | 1 | 37 | 11 | +26 | 37 | Advance to Championship play-offs | | 4–1 | 3–1 | 3–1 | 1–0 | 4–1 | 2–1 | 4–0 |
| 2 | UTC | 14 | 7 | 4 | 3 | 27 | 20 | +7 | 25 | Advance to Championship play-offs | 2–1 | | 3–3 | 1–1 | 4–0 | 3–0 | 1–0 | 1–0 |
| 3 | ADT | 14 | 6 | 4 | 4 | 35 | 25 | +10 | 22 | | 0–3 | 2–1 | | 1–1 | 3–1 | 4–1 | 4–2 | 7–1 |
| 4 | Alianza Universidad | 14 | 6 | 4 | 4 | 22 | 25 | −3 | 22 | | 1–3 | 1–1 | 2–1 | | 1–0 | 2–0 | 3–1 | 3–2 |
| 5 | Deportivo Llacuabamba | 14 | 6 | 0 | 8 | 26 | 24 | +2 | 18 | | 1–3 | 2–3 | 3–2 | 7–1 | | 3–0 | 3–1 | 4–0 |
| 6 | Unión Comercio | 14 | 4 | 2 | 8 | 19 | 27 | −8 | 14 | | 0–2 | 5–0 | 2–2 | 2–3 | 3–0 | | 2–1 | 1–0 |
| 7 | Unión Huaral | 14 | 4 | 2 | 8 | 18 | 26 | −8 | 14 | | 1–3 | 1–1 | 0–0 | 2–1 | 2–1 | 1–0 | | 5–2 |
| 8 | Comerciantes Unidos | 14 | 1 | 3 | 10 | 13 | 39 | −26 | 6 | | 1–1 | 0–4 | 2–5 | 1–1 | 0–1 | 2–2 | 2–0 | |

First match(es) will be played: TBC 2022. Source: Liga 1
Legend: Blue = home team win; Yellow = draw; Red = away team win.
Rules for classification: 1) Points; 2) Goal difference; 3) Goals for; 4) Fair play points; 5) Drawing of lots; 6) Play-off (only if needed to decide first place).
If two teams are tied in points for first place: 2) Play-off.

== Championship play-offs ==
Qualified teams
| Pos. | Group A (North) | Group B (Lima & Callao) | Group C (South) | Group D (Center) |
|---|---|---|---|---|
| 1 | Universidad César Vallejo | Universitario | Melgar | Sport Huancayo |
| 2 | Carlos Stein | Alianza Lima | Ayacucho | UTC |

=== Bracket ===
Quarterfinals
Alianza Lima | 1 | 0 | 1 (10)
Universidad César Vallejo | 1 | 0 | 1 (9)
Melgar | 4 | 8 | 12
UTC | 1 | 0 | 1
Ayacucho | 2 | 1 | 3
Universitario | 0 | 2 | 2
Carlos Stein | 0 | 1 | 1
Sport Huancayo | 1 | 4 | 5

Semifinals
Alianza Lima | 3 (4)
Melgar | 3 (3)
Ayacucho | 1
Sport Huancayo | 0

Finals
Alianza Lima | 1
Ayacucho | 0

=== Quarterfinals ===
==== First leg ====
| 2 September 2022 | Ayacucho | 2–0 | Universitario | Ciudad de Cumaná, Ayacucho |
| 12:00 | David Dioses 29'; Enrique Achahuanco 68' |

| 2 September 2022 | Carlos Stein | 0–1 | Sport Huancayo | Municipal de Batangrande, Chiclayo |
| 13:00 | | | Gibson Fuentes |

| 3 September 2022 | Alianza Lima | 1–1 | Universidad César Vallejo | Club Cultural Lima, Lima |
| 10:00 | Miguel Cornejo 12' (pen.) | | Nahuel Rodríguez 48' (pen.) |

| 4 September 2022 | UTC | 1–4 | Melgar | Héroes de San Ramón, Cajamarca |
| 15:30 | 58' | | Bruno Portugal 23' 64' 75'; Jefferson Cáceres 56' |

==== Second leg ====
| 9 September 2022 | Sport Huancayo | 4–1 | Carlos Stein | Monumental de Jauja, Jauja |
| 11:00 | Maycol Almonacid 30'; Gianmarco Mendoza 52' 65' 88' | | Israel Kahn 49' |

| 9 September 2022 | Melgar | 8–0 | UTC | Virgen de Chapi, Arequipa |
| 15:00 | Jefferson Cáceres 6'; Bruno Portugal 14' 58' 75'; Nicolas Figueroa 45'; Marcelo Cervantes 57'; Alejandro Oncoy 66'; Mariano Barreda 67' |

| 10 September 2022 | Universidad César Vallejo | 0–0 (9–10 p) | Alianza Lima | Villa Poeta, Trujillo |
| 10:00 |

| 10 September 2022 | Universitario | 2–1 | Ayacucho | Monumental, Lima |
| 11:00 | Erwin Paiva 9'; Franco Guerra 88' (o.g.) | | César Simón 27' |

=== Semifinals ===
| 14 September 2022 | Alianza Lima | 3–3 (4–3 p) | Melgar | Segundo Aranda Torres, Huacho |
| 11:00 | Sebastian Pineau 20' 32'; Jorge Del Castillo 89' (pen.) | | Abraham Aguinaga 3'; Jefferson Cáceres 81' 90+5' |
| | Penalties |
| | Joao Montoya (penalty scored); Sebastián Pineau (penalty missed); Jefferson Portales (penalty scored); Enzo Borletti (penalty scored); Jorge Del Castillo (penalty missed); Fred Samayoa (penalty scored) | | Kenji Cabrera (penalty scored); Bruno Portugal (penalty scored); Mariano Barreda (penalty scored); Nicolás Figueroa (penalty missed); Jefferson Cáceres (penalty missed); Marcelo Cervantes (penalty missed) |

| 14 September 2022 | Ayacucho | 1–0 | Sport Huancayo | Segundo Aranda Torres, Huacho |
| 15:00 | Hans Aquino 61' |

=== Final ===
| 17 September 2022 | Alianza Lima | 1–0 | Ayacucho | Segundo Aranda Torres, Huacho |
| 13:30 | Sebastian Pineau 35' |

== See also ==
- 2022 Liga 1
- 2022 Liga 2
