= 2018 Torneo de Promoción y Reservas =

Torneo de Promoción y Reservas
- Season: 2018
- Champions: Sporting Cristal

The Torneo de Promoción y Reservas is a football tournament in Peru. There are currently 16 clubs in the league. Each team will have a roster of twelve 21-year-old players, three 19-year-olds, and three older reinforcements; whenever they be recorded in the club. The tournament will offer the champion two bonus points and the runner-up one bonus point to the respective regular teams in the 2018 Torneo Descentralizado.

== Teams ==
=== Stadia and locations ===
Locations of the 2018 Torneo de Promoción y Reserva teams

Team	City	Stadium	Capacity
Academia Cantolao	Callao	Miguel Grau	15,000
Alianza Lima	Lima	Alejandro Villanueva	35,000
Ayacucho	Ayacucho	Ciudad de Cumaná^{a}	15,000
Binacional	Arequipa	Virgen de Chapi	60,000
Comerciantes Unidos	Cutervo	Carlos A. Olivares^{b}	12,000
Deportivo Municipal	Lima	Miguel Grau^{c}	17,000
Melgar	Arequipa	Virgen de Chapi	60,000
Real Garcilaso	Cusco	Estadio Garcilaso	42,056
Sport Boys	Callao	Miguel Grau	17,000
Sport Huancayo	Huancayo	Estadio Huancayo	20,000
Sport Rosario	Huaraz	Rosas Pampa	18,000
Sporting Cristal	Lima	Alberto Gallardo	18,000
Unión Comercio	Nueva Cajamarca	IPD de Nueva Cajamarca	12,000
Universidad San Martín	Lima	Alberto Gallardo	18,000
UTC	Cajamarca	Germán Contreras^{d}	6,300
Universitario	Lima	Monumental	80,093

== Torneo de Verano ==
=== Group A ===
Pos	Team	Pld	W	D	L	GF	GA	GD	Pts	CRI	USM	UNI	ALI	SRO	AYA	UTC	COM
1	Sporting Cristal	14	12	1	1	50	11	+39	37		4–1	4–1	4–1	5–1	6–0	4–0	3–0
2	Universidad San Martín	14	10	0	4	37	24	+13	30	0–4		3–1	2–0	4–2	2–1	4–0	2–0
3	Universitario	14	9	2	3	32	17	+15	29	2–1	3–0		1–1	4–0	3–0	6–1	3–1
4	Alianza Lima	14	6	2	6	26	30	−4	20	1–6	3–5	3–2		5–3	4–1	3–2	0–1
5	Sport Rosario	14	3	3	8	19	34	−15	12	1–2	4–3	1–2	0–0		1–0	2–0	1–1
6	Ayacucho	14	3	2	9	21	31	−10	11	3–3	2–3	1–2	1–2	6–2		3–1	3–0
7	UTC	14	3	2	9	12	32	−20	11	0–3	0–3	1–1	2–0	2–1	2–0		0–0
8	Comerciantes Unidos	14	2	4	8	5	23	−18	10	0–1	0–5	0–1	0–3	0–0	0–0	2–1	

Source: ADFP, Soccerway
Legend: Blue = home team win; Yellow = draw; Red = away team win.
Rules for classification: 1) points; 2) goal difference; 3) goals scored; 4) draw.

=== Group B ===
Pos	Team	Pld	W	D	L	GF	GA	GD	Pts	MEL	CAN	SBA	RGA	SHU	BIN	MUN	UCO
1	Melgar	14	8	3	3	30	19	+11	27		1–1	2–1	2–1	0–0	2–2	2–0	5–0
2	Academia Cantolao	14	6	5	3	19	19	0	23	2–1		2–1	2–0	1–0	2–2	2–2	1–1
3	Sport Boys	14	6	4	4	26	19	+7	22	4–2	1–0		4–0	1–0	5–0	1–0	3–3
4	Real Garcilaso	14	7	1	6	17	16	+1	22	3–0	4–0	1–1		1–0	0–1	2–0	1–0
5	Sport Huancayo	14	6	3	5	18	12	+6	21	2–3	2–0	4–1	0–1		3–2	1–0	1–0
6	Binacional	14	4	5	5	16	31	−15	17	1–5	1–1	2–2	1–0	1–1		1–0	1–0
7	Deportivo Municipal	14	3	3	8	15	18	−3	12	0–1	1–2	1–1	4–1	0–3	5–0		2–1
8	Unión Comercio	14	2	4	8	18	25	−7	10	2–4	2–3	2–0	1–2	1–1	5–1	0–0	

Source: ADFP, Soccerway
Legend: Blue = home team win; Yellow = draw; Red = away team win.
Rules for classification: 1) points; 2) goal difference; 3) goals scored; 4) draw.

=== Aggregate table ===
Pos	Team	Pld	W	D	L	GF	GA	GD	Pts	Qualification
1	Sporting Cristal	14	12	1	1	50	11	+39	37	Bonus +2 to Torneo Apertura (Reserva)
2	Universidad San Martín	14	10	0	4	37	24	+13	30	Bonus +1 to Torneo Apertura (Reserva)
3	Universitario	14	9	2	3	32	17	+15	29	
4	Melgar	14	8	3	3	30	19	+11	27	
5	Academia Cantolao	14	6	5	3	19	19	0	23	
6	Sport Boys	14	6	4	4	26	19	+7	22	
7	Real Garcilaso	14	7	1	6	17	16	+1	22	
8	Sport Huancayo	14	6	3	5	18	12	+6	21	
9	Alianza Lima	14	6	2	6	26	30	−4	20	
10	Binacional	14	4	5	5	16	31	−15	17	
11	Deportivo Municipal	14	3	3	8	15	18	−3	12	
12	Sport Rosario	14	3	3	8	19	34	−15	12	
13	Ayacucho	14	3	2	9	21	31	−10	11	
14	UTC	14	3	2	9	12	32	−20	11	
15	Unión Comercio	14	2	4	8	18	25	−7	10	
16	Comerciantes Unidos	14	2	4	8	5	23	−18	10	

Source: ADFP, Soccerway
Rules for classification: 1) points; 2) goal difference; 3) goals scored; 4) draw.

== Torneo Descentralizado ==
=== Torneo Apertura ===
==== Standings ====
Pos	Team	Pld	W	D	L	GF	GA	GD	Pts
1	Sporting Cristal	15	13	2	0	52	10	+42	43 (Note: Sporting Cristal were awarded 2 points for 2018 Torneo de Verano champion.)
2	Sport Huancayo	15	11	2	2	27	14	+13	35
3	Universitario	15	8	3	4	32	21	+11	27
4	Sport Boys	15	7	5	3	26	16	+10	26
5	Melgar	15	8	2	5	22	15	+7	26
6	Universidad San Martín	15	8	0	7	32	31	+1	25 (Note: Universidad San Martin were awarded 1 point for 2018 Torneo de Verano runner-up.)
7	Real Garcilaso	15	7	3	5	15	21	−6	24
8	Alianza Lima	15	6	5	4	29	12	+17	23
9	Academia Cantolao	15	5	6	4	23	21	+2	21
10	Unión Comercio	15	3	7	5	18	23	−5	16
11	Deportivo Municipal	15	3	7	5	16	23	−7	16
12	Binacional	15	4	3	8	20	29	−9	15
13	Ayacucho	15	3	3	9	21	33	−12	12
14	Sport Rosario	15	4	0	11	12	34	−22	12
15	Comerciantes Unidos	15	3	1	11	15	33	−18	10
16	UTC	15	2	1	12	14	37	−23	7

Rules for classification: 1) Points; 2) Goal difference; 3) Goals for; 4) Drawing of lots;

==== Results ====
Home \ Away	CAN	ALI	AYA	BIN	COM	MUN	MEL	RGA	SBA	SHU	SRO	CRI	UCO	USM	UNI	UTC
Academia Cantolao		1–1	4–2	1–1			1–2	2–0	0–0					3–2		
Alianza Lima			6–0	2–0	3–1	4–0			2–2				1–1	3–0		5–0
Ayacucho					0–2	0–0				1–3	3–0	1–2	1–1	4–1		4–0
Binacional			2–1		4–1	1–1					2–1	2–5	3–2	0–2		2–3
Comerciantes Unidos	1–2					1–4	0–2			0–1	2–0	0–3			1–2	
Deportivo Municipal	0–0						2–2	1–0		1–2	3–2	0–2	2–2		1–1	
Melgar		2–0	3–0	1–0				0–1	2–1					0–1		2–0
Real Garcilaso		1–0	2–1	1–0	2–1				2–2					3–1		2–1
Sport Boys			1–1	3–1	3–0	0–0						0–4	4–0	4–0		2–1
Sport Huancayo	3–2	0–0		3–0			3–1	1–1	3–2				2–0		1–0	
Sport Rosario	1–2	1–0					0–3	2–1	0–1	0–2			2–1		0–4	
Sporting Cristal	2–1	1–1					4–0	6–0		4–0	6–0		2–2		5–2	
Unión Comercio	2–0				2–2		2–2	0–0						0–2	1–0	2–0
Universidad San Martín					5–1	3–1				2–0	5–3	1–2			3–4	4–3
Universitario	2–2	2–1	6–2	2–2			1–0	4–0	0–1							
UTC	2–2				0–2	3–0				0–3	0–1	0–4			1–2	

Source: ADFP, Soccerway
Legend: Blue = home team win; Yellow = draw; Red = away team win.

=== Torneo Clausura ===
==== Standings ====
Pos	Team	Pld	W	D	L	GF	GA	GD	Pts	Qualification
1	Sporting Cristal	30	19	8	3	85	29	+56	67 (Note: Sporting Cristal were awarded 2 points for 2018 Torneo de Verano champion.)	Bonus +2 to 2018 Torneo Descentralizado
2	Alianza Lima	30	18	7	5	63	21	+42	61	Bonus +1 to 2018 Torneo Descentralizado
3	Sport Boys	30	17	6	7	56	33	+23	57	
4	Universidad San Martín	30	17	3	10	63	51	+12	55 (Note: Universidad San Martin were awarded 1 point for 2018 Torneo de Verano runner-up.)	
5	Sport Huancayo	30	15	5	10	48	34	+14	50	
6	Academia Cantolao	30	14	7	9	55	37	+18	49	
7	Universitario	30	13	6	11	51	41	+10	45	
8	Melgar	30	12	7	11	43	41	+2	43	
9	Real Garcilaso	30	12	7	11	42	54	−12	43	
10	Unión Comercio	30	10	9	11	50	48	+2	39	
11	Deportivo Municipal	30	9	12	9	34	44	−10	39	
12	Comerciantes Unidos	30	11	5	14	45	48	−3	38	
13	Ayacucho	30	7	4	19	37	71	−34	25	
14	Binacional	30	6	6	18	36	64	−28	24	
15	UTC	30	7	2	21	33	62	−29	23	
16	Sport Rosario	30	5	2	23	25	88	−63	17	

First match(es) will be played: 2018. Source: ADFP
Rules for classification: 1) Points; 2) Goal difference; 3) Goals for; 4) Drawing of lots; 5) Play-off (only if needed to decide first place).
If two teams are tied in points for first place: 2) Play-off.

==== Results ====
Home \ Away	CAN	ALI	AYA	BIN	COM	MUN	MEL	RGA	SBA	SHU	SRO	CRI	UCO	USM	UNI	UTC
Academia Cantolao					4–2	2–2				2–1	3–0	1–0	2–0		2–0	3–0
Alianza Lima	3–2						1–0	2–1		3–1	10–0	0–0			3–0	
Ayacucho	0–4	0–1		0–1			2–1	4–3	2–3						0–3	
Binacional	0–4	0–1					3–3	3–3	1–4	0–1					2–3	
Comerciantes Unidos		1–2	0–0	2–0				6–1	2–0				3–1	3–3		2–1
Deportivo Municipal		1–1	2–1	2–0	0–0				2–0					1–1		1–0
Melgar	1–0				1–1	2–0				1–1	3–2	2–0	1–3		2–2	
Real Garcilaso	2–0					2–2	4–0			2–1	0–0	4–4	3–1		1–0	
Sport Boys	2–1	0–1					1–0	3–0		1–0	6–0				1–0	
Sport Huancayo			4–0		0–1	3–1					5–1	1–1		1–3		0–1
Sport Rosario			2–3	0–3	0–3	1–2						1–4		3–2		1–1
Sporting Cristal			5–0	1–1	0–3	5–0			5–2					2–0		3–1
Unión Comercio		0–3	4–0	5–1		2–0			2–2	2–1	5–1	2–2				
Universidad San Martín	3–2	2–1	2–0	3–0			3–3	2–0	1–2				4–2			
Universitario					2–1	1–2				1–1	3–0	1–1	0–3	0–1		3–0
UTC		1–2	3–4	3–1			2–1	4–0	0–3				2–0	0–1		

Source: ADFP, Soccerway
Legend: Blue = home team win; Yellow = draw; Red = away team win.

== See also ==
- 2018 Torneo Descentralizado
