= 2023 Torneo de Reservas (Peru) =

Torneo de Reservas
- Season: 2023
- Dates: 20 May – 23 November 2023
- Champions: Sporting Cristal (4th title)
- U-20 Copa Libertadores: Sporting Cristal

The Torneo de Reservas was a football tournament in Peru. There are currently 19 clubs in the league. Each team will have a roster of 21-year-old players; whenever they be recorded in the club..

== Teams ==
=== Stadia and locations ===
Locations of the 2023 Torneo de Promoción y Reserva teams
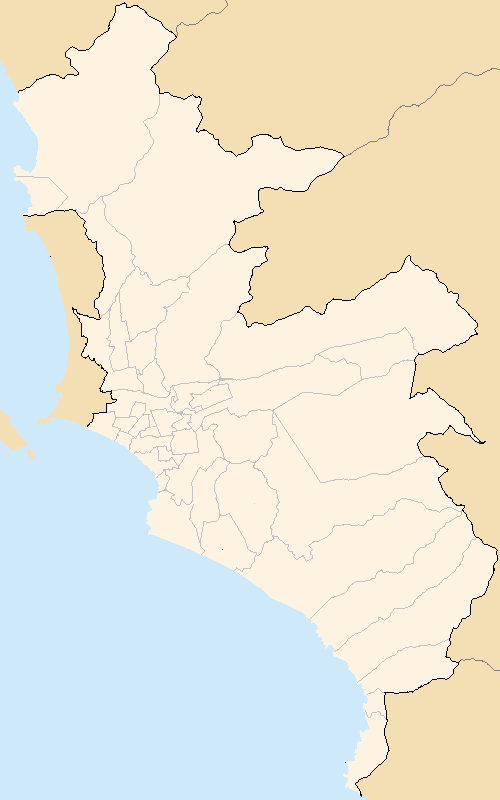
Locations of the 2023 Torneo de Promoción y Reserva teams – Lima.
Locations of the 2023 Torneo de Promoción y Reserva teams – Callao.

Team	City	Stadium	Capacity
Academia Cantolao	Callao	Miguel Grau	17,000
ADT	Tarma	Unión Tarma	9,000
Alianza Atlético	Sullana	Campeones del 36	12,000
Alianza Lima	Lima	Alejandro Villanueva	35,000
Atlético Grau	Piura	Municipal de Bernal	7,000
Binacional	Juliaca	Guillermo Briceño Rosamedina	20,030
Carlos A. Mannucci	Trujillo	Mansiche	25,000
Cienciano	Cusco	Garcilaso	42,056
Cusco	Cusco	Garcilaso	42,056
Deportivo Garcilaso	Cusco	Garcilaso	42,056
Deportivo Municipal	Lima	Iván Elías Moreno	10,000
Melgar	Arequipa	Virgen de Chapi	60,000
Sport Boys	Callao	Miguel Grau	17,000
Sport Huancayo	Huancayo	Huancayo	20,000
Sporting Cristal	Lima	Alberto Gallardo	11,600
Unión Comercio	Nueva Cajamarca	IPD de Moyobamba	12,000
Universidad César Vallejo	Trujillo	Mansiche	25,000
Universitario	Lima	Monumental	80,093
UTC	Cajamarca	Héroes de San Ramón	18,000

== First Stage ==
=== Standings ===
Pos	Team	Pld	W	D	L	Pts	Qualification
1	Sporting Cristal	18	13	3	2	42	Liguilla A
2	Universitario	18	13	1	4	40	Liguilla B
3	Melgar	18	12	3	3	39	Liguilla A
4	Universidad César Vallejo	18	9	6	3	33	Liguilla B
5	ADT	18	10	3	5	33	Liguilla A
6	Alianza Lima	18	10	2	6	32	Liguilla B
7	Atlético Grau	18	8	4	6	28	Liguilla A
8	Sport Huancayo	18	7	5	6	26	Liguilla B
9	Binacional	18	7	4	7	25	Liguilla A
10	Sport Boys	18	7	3	8	24	Liguilla B
11	Carlos A. Mannucci	18	7	3	8	24	Liguilla A
12	Deportivo Municipal	18	6	5	7	23	Liguilla B
13	Cienciano	18	7	2	9	23	
14	UTC	18	4	5	9	17	
15	Unión Comercio	18	4	4	10	16	
16	Alianza Atlético	18	5	1	12	16	
17	Cusco	18	3	5	10	14	
18	Deportivo Garcilaso	18	4	1	13	13	
19	Academia Cantolao	18	2	4	12	10	

Updated to match(es) played on 24 September 2023. Source: Liga 1
Rules for classification: 1) Points; 2) Goal difference; 3) Goals for; 4) Fair play points; 5) Drawing of lots.

=== Results ===
Home \ Away	CAN	ADT	AAS	ALI	CAG	BIN	CAM	CIE	CUS	GAR	MUN	MEL	SBA	SHU	CRI	UCO	UCV	UNI	UTC
Academia Cantolao			2–3	0–2						1–0	1–1	0–1		4–2	0–6			0–2	2–2
ADT	2–1		1–2	2–0	2–0	1–2								4–1	2–1			2–1	2–1
Alianza Atlético					1–4	1–0	3–0	2–0	2–2				0–1		1–5	6–1	0–2		
Alianza Lima			5–1		0–2	1–0				2–0				3–1	1–3	1–0		2–1	0–0
Atlético Grau	1–1					3–1	4–1	2–2		6–1				3–2	1–1			1–3	4–0
Binacional	3–0						1–1	1–2	4–2	1–0	1–1		3–1			2–1	2–1		
Carlos A. Mannucci	3–2	2–1		0–3				8–2	3–0	3–2	1–1	2–0	1–2						
Cienciano	1–0	1–2		4–1							1–0	2–2	0–3	0–1				3–4	3–0
Cusco	3–0	1–3		1–3	1–1			2–6				1–3	2–2				1–2		3–1
Deportivo Garcilaso		0–3	4–0					1–3	5–0		4–2	1–4	2–0			1–1	0–5		
Deportivo Municipal		1–0	3–2	1–0	0–1				7–0			2–0	1–1	0–0			0–1		
Melgar		2–1	4–0	3–0	3–1	2–1								3–2	0–2	5–1		3–1	
Sport Boys	3–0	1–1		2–4	3–1							0–3		1–0	1–3		1–2		1–0
Sport Huancayo			4–2			0–0	2–0		2–2	3–0					1–1	2–1	1–1	2–1	
Sporting Cristal						2–0	4–1	3–0	5–0	8–0	0–1					5–0		0–0	4–0
Unión Comercio	0–0	1–1			1–0		6–1	4–3	0–0		0–3		2–1				1–2		
Universidad César Vallejo	4–0	0–0		0–0	4–3		2–2	4–1				3–3			0–1				0–0
Universitario			5–1			4–0	4–3		4–0	2–0	2–0		3–0			3–1	2–0		
UTC			2–1			0–0	0–2			1–0	3–1	0–0		2–3		3–0		1–8	

Updated to match(es) played on 4 October 2023. Source: Liga 1, Soccerway
Legend: Blue = home team win; Yellow = draw; Red = away team win.

== Playoffs ==
=== Liguilla A ===
==== Standings ====
Pos	Team	Pld	W	D	L	GF	GA	GD	Pts	Qualification	MEL	CRI	CAM	CAG	ADT	BIN
1	Melgar	5	3	1	1	9	2	+7	10	Advance to Championship play-offs			1–0	5–0		3–0
2	Sporting Cristal	5	2	3	0	9	6	+3	9	Advance to Championship play-offs	2–0			2–2	2–1	
3	Carlos A. Mannucci	5	2	2	1	6	5	+1	8			2–2				1–0
4	Atlético Grau	5	1	2	2	6	11	−5	5				1–1		1–0	
5	ADT	5	1	1	3	6	6	0	4		0–0		1–2			4–1
6	Binacional	5	1	1	3	5	11	−6	4			1–1		3–2		

Updated to match(es) played on 24 October 2023. Source: Liga 1
Legend: Blue = home team win; Yellow = draw; Red = away team win.
Rules for classification: 1) Points; 2) Goal difference; 3) Goals for; 4) Fair play points; 5) Drawing of lots.

=== Liguilla B ===
==== Standings ====
Pos	Team	Pld	W	D	L	GF	GA	GD	Pts	Qualification	UCV	UNI	SHU	ALI	SBA	MUN
1	Universidad César Vallejo	5	4	1	0	7	3	+4	13	Advance to Championship play-offs			2–1		1–0	1–1
2	Universitario	5	3	1	1	14	5	+9	10	Advance to Championship play-offs	0–1		8–0	1–1		
3	Sport Huancayo	5	3	0	2	8	12	−4	9					2–0	2–1	
4	Alianza Lima	5	1	2	2	7	9	−2	5		1–2				2–1	3–3
5	Sport Boys	5	1	0	4	7	10	−3	3			2–3				3–2
6	Deportivo Municipal	5	0	2	3	8	12	−4	2			1–2	1–3			

Updated to match(es) played on 30 October 2023. Source: Liga 1
Legend: Blue = home team win; Yellow = draw; Red = away team win.
Rules for classification: 1) Points; 2) Goal difference; 3) Goals for; 4) Fair play points; 5) Drawing of lots.

== Championship play-offs ==
=== Bracket ===
Semifinals
Melgar	1	0	1
Universitario	4	0	4
Universidad César Vallejo	1	0	1
Sporting Cristal	2	0	2

Finals
Universitario	1	1	2
Sporting Cristal	0	3	3

=== Semifinals ===
==== First leg ====
6 November 2023	Universitario	4–1	Melgar	Campo Mar, Lima
10:30	Anghelo Flores 2'; Chase Villanueva 8' 61'; Álvaro Torres 27'		Mariano Barrera 35'

6 November 2023	Sporting Cristal	2–1	Universidad César Vallejo	La Florida, Lima
13:00	Ian Wisdom 25'; Gilmar Paredes 49'		Christian Valladolid 90+1'

==== Second leg ====
12 November 2023	Universidad César Vallejo	0–0	Sporting Cristal	Villa Poeta, Trujillo
10:30

12 November 2023	Melgar	0–0	Universitario	Virgen de Chapi, Arequipa
13:00

=== Finals ===
==== First leg ====
17 November 2023	Universitario	1–0	Sporting Cristal	Campo Mar, Lima
10:30	Chase Villanueva 77' (pen.)

==== Second leg ====
23 November 2023	Sporting Cristal	3–1	Universitario	La Florida, Lima
10:30	Aldair Vásquez 48' 62'; Joel Herrera 83'		José Espinoza 81'

== See also ==
- 2023 Liga 1
- 2023 Liga 2
