= Torneo de Promoción y Reservas (Peru) =

- Founded: 2010; 16 years ago
- First season: 2010
- Folded: 2024; 2 years ago
- Country: Peru
- Number of clubs: 18
- Last champions: Universitario de Deportes (2024)
- Most championships: Sporting Cristal (4 titles)
- Broadcaster(s): Nativa

The Torneo de Promoción y Reservas was a youth football league in Peru for the Peruvian football teams in the Liga 1. The league made its debut in 2010.

The league covers has certain rules involving under age players and benefits for the senior teams. Each team must have at least three players that are at the most 19 years old. The rest of the team can be made up of players that are at the most 21 years old; however, each team has the option to have up to three players that are over the age of 21. The winning reserve team awards their senior club 2 points while the runners-up awards its senior team 1 point.

== Background ==
From 1931 to 1937 there was a Reserve Tournament that was part of the Campeonato de Selección y Competencia of the Peruvian First Division. The sum of points from this tournament plus that from the Primeros Equipos Tournament gave the title of First Division champion. These tournaments stopped being played because they entered into controversy due to the sum of points. The reserve tournament awarded: 3 points to the winner of a match, 2 to a draw, 1 to a defeat and 0 to the team that did not show up (walk over). The reserve tournament provided a bonus of 0.25 points for each point obtained.

=== Torneo Equipos de Reserva ===
Season	Champion	Runner-up
1930	Federación Universitaria	Alianza Lima
1931	Federación Universitaria	Alianza Frigorífico
1932	Federación Universitaria	Alianza Lima
1933	Sportivo Tarapacá Ferrocarril	Universitario de Deportes
1934	Alianza Lima	Universitario de Deportes
1935	No Tournament	
1936	League not played due to Peruvian participation in the 1936 Summer Olympics	
1937	Deportivo Municipal	Universitario de Deportes
1941	Alianza Lima	Universitario de Deportes
1943	Deportivo Municipal	
1948	Alianza Lima	Sport Boys
1949	Sucre	Alianza Lima
1950	Centro Iqueño	Atlético Chalaco
1951	Centro Iqueño	Universitario de Deportes
1955	Universitario de Deportes	
1965	Universitario de Deportes	

=== Torneo Equipos de Reserva (Grupo Metropolitano) ===
Season	Champion	Runner-up
1981	Universitario de Deportes	Deportivo Municipal

=== Torneo Sub-20 ===
Season	Champion	Runner-up
2002 Clausura	Alianza Lima	Sport Coopsol

== Champions ==
- (In bracket, title count):

Ed.	Season	Champion	Runner-up	Winning manager	Leading goalscorer(s)
Torneo de Promoción y Reservas
1	2010	Universidad César Vallejo (1)	Universidad San Martín	(Peru) Benjamín Navarro	(Peru) Francesco Recalde (Universidad César Vallejo; 14 goals) (Peru) Diago Portugal (Alianza Lima; 14 goals)
2	2011	Alianza Lima (1)	Juan Aurich	(Peru) José Soto	(Peru) Miguel Curiel (Alianza Lima; 22 goals)
3	2012	Juan Aurich (1)	Universidad San Martín	(Peru) Juan Chumpitaz	(Peru) José Paolo Lolandes (Sport Huancayo; 16 goals)
4	2013	Universidad San Martín (1)	Alianza Lima	(Peru) Orlando Lavalle	(Peru) Francesco Recalde (Universidad César Vallejo; 14 goals)
5	2014	Melgar (1)	Universitario de Deportes	(Peru) Miguel Miranda	(Peru) Aurelio Gonzáles-Vigil (Melgar; 15 goals)
6	2015	Melgar (2)	Unión Comercio	(Peru) Gerardo Calero	(Peru) Johan Rey (Unión Comercio; 14 goals)
7	2016	Sporting Cristal (1)	Universitario de Deportes	(Peru) Pablo Zegarra	(Peru) Santiago Rebagliati (Sporting Cristal; 23 goals)
8	2017	Sport Huancayo (1)	Sporting Cristal	(Peru) Abilio Meneses	(Peru) Kevin Sánchez (Sporting Cristal; 28 goals)
9	2018	Sporting Cristal (2)	Alianza Lima	(Peru) Pablo Zegarra	(Peru) Alexis Rojas (Universidad San Martín; 24 goals)
10	2019	Sporting Cristal (3)	Sport Huancayo	(Peru) Conrad Flores	(Peru) Daniel Tarazona (Academia Cantolao; 24 goals)
11	2020	No completed due to the COVID-19 pandemic			
–	2021	Canceled due to the COVID-19 pandemic. Replaced by the Copa Generación Sub-18			
12	2022	Alianza Lima (2)	Ayacucho	(Peru) Kenji Aparicio	(Peru) Bruno Portugal (Melgar)
Torneo de Reservas
13	2023	Sporting Cristal (4)	Universitario de Deportes	(Uruguay) Jorge Cazulo	(Peru) Aldair Vázquez (Sporting Cristal; 14 goals)
14	2024	Universitario de Deportes (1)	Melgar	(Peru) Jorge Araujo	(Peru) Juan David Martínez (Sport Huancayo; 15 goals)
Defunct Tournament (See: Torneo Juvenil Sub-18)

== Titles by club ==
Rank	Club	Winners	Runners-up	Winning years	Runners-up years
1	Sporting Cristal	4	1	2016, 2018, 2019, 2023	2017
2	Alianza Lima	2	2	2011, 2022	2013, 2018
2	Melgar	2	—	2014, 2015	—
3	Universidad San Martín	1	2	2013	2010, 2012
3	Universitario de Deportes	1	2	2024	2016, 2023
3	Juan Aurich	1	1	2012	2011
3	Sport Huancayo	1	1	2017	2019
3	Universidad César Vallejo	1	—	2010	—

== Titles by region ==
Region	Nº of titles	Clubs
Lima	8	Sporting Cristal (4), Alianza Lima (2), Universidad San Martín (1), Universitario de Deportes (1)
Arequipa	2	Melgar (2)
(Junín Region) Junín	1	Sport Huancayo (1)
(La Libertad Region) La Libertad	1	Universidad César Vallejo (1)
(Department of Lambayeque) Lambayeque	1	Juan Aurich (1)

== Half-year / Short tournaments ==
Season		Champion	Runner-up
2014	Torneo del Inca	Universitario de Deportes	Sporting Cristal
2015	Torneo del Inca	Universitario de Deportes	Melgar
2015	Apertura	Melgar	Unión Comercio
2015	Clausura	Universidad San Martín	Sporting Cristal
2016	Apertura	Sporting Cristal	Universitario de Deportes
2016	Clausura	Sporting Cristal	Universitario de Deportes
2016	Copa Modelo Centenario	Sporting Cristal	Universidad San Martín
2017	Torneo de Verano	Sporting Cristal	Sport Huancayo
2017	Apertura	Sporting Cristal	Sport Huancayo
2017	Clausura	Sport Huancayo	Melgar
2018	Torneo de Verano	Sporting Cristal	Universidad San Martín
2018	Apertura	Sporting Cristal	Sport Huancayo
2018	Clausura	Sporting Cristal	Alianza Lima

== See also ==
- 2021 U-18 Copa Generación
- Torneo Juvenil Sub-18
