= 2000 Campeonato Sudamericano de Fútbol Femenino =

Campeonato Sudamericano Interclubes de Fútbol Femenino
- Season: 2000
- Dates: 5 March – 18 Match 2000
- Champions: Sporting Cristal (1st title)
- Runner up: (Peru) Sport Coopsol
- Matches: 20
- Goals: 109 (5.45 per match)

The '2000 Campeonato Sudamericano Interclubes de Fútbol Femenino' was an unofficial women's football tournament organized by the Peruvian Football Federation. The matches were played between Lima and Callao during March 2000. The champion was Sporting Cristal.

== Qualified teams ==
Qualified teams
(Argentina) Banfield	(Ecuador) Todas Estrellas	(Peru) Sport Coopsol	(Uruguay) Nacional
(Argentina) River Plate	(Paraguay) Universidad Autónoma	(Peru) Sporting Cristal	(Uruguay) Rampla Juniors
(Colombia) Santa Fe	(Peru) Sport Boys	(Peru) Univ. San Marcos / Garcilaso	(Venezuela) All Stars Mérida

== Group Stage ==
=== Group A ===
Pos	Team	Pld	W	D	L	GF	GA	GD	Pts	Qualification	(Peru) CRI	(Paraguay) UAA	(Argentina) BAN	(Venezuela) ASM
1	(Peru) Sporting Cristal	3	2	1	0	14	1	+13	7	Advance to Quarterfinals		1–1	2–0	11–0
2	(Paraguay) Universidad Autónoma	3	1	2	0	7	3	+4	5	Advance to Quarterfinals				4–0
3	(Argentina) Banfield	3	1	1	1	4	6	−2	4	Advance to Quarterfinals		2–2		2–2
4	(Venezuela) All Stars Mérida	3	0	1	2	2	17	−15	1					

Rules for classification: 1) Points; 2) Goal difference; 3) Goals for; 4) Fair play points; 5) Drawing of lots.

=== Group B ===
Pos	Team	Pld	W	D	L	GF	GA	GD	Pts	Qualification	(Peru) COO	(Uruguay) NAC	(Colombia) SFE	(Peru) USM
1	(Peru) Sport Coopsol	3	3	0	0	16	4	+12	9	Advance to Quarterfinals		10–2	2–0	4–2
2	(Uruguay) Nacional	3	2	0	1	9	11	−2	6	Advance to Quarterfinals			2–1	
3	(Colombia) Santa Fe	3	0	1	2	2	4	−2	1					1–1
4	(Peru) Univ. San Marcos / Garcilaso	3	0	1	2	3	10	−7	1			0–5		

Rules for classification: 1) Points; 2) Goal difference; 3) Goals for; 4) Fair play points; 5) Drawing of lots.

=== Group C ===
Pos	Team	Pld	W	D	L	GF	GA	GD	Pts	Qualification	(Argentina) RIV	(Peru) SBA	(Venezuela) TOD	(Uruguay) RAM
1	(Argentina) River Plate	3	2	1	0	3	0	+3	7	Advance to Quarterfinals			2–0	1–0
2	(Peru) Sport Boys	3	1	2	0	8	5	+3	5	Advance to Quarterfinals	0–0		5–2	3–3
3	(Ecuador) Todas Estrellas	3	1	0	2	2	7	−5	3	Advance to Quarterfinals				3–1
4	(Uruguay) Rampla Juniors	3	0	1	2	4	7	−3	1					

Rules for classification: 1) Points; 2) Goal difference; 3) Goals for; 4) Fair play points; 5) Drawing of lots.

== Final Stage ==
=== Bracket ===
Quarterfinals
(Peru) Sporting Cristal	5
(Argentina) Banfield	1
(Peru) Sport Boys	2 (5)
(Uruguay) Nacional	2 (3)
(Peru) Sport Coopsol	3 (3)
(Ecuador) Todas Estrellas	3 (1)
(Paraguay) Universidad Autónoma	4
(Argentina) River Plate	1

Semifinals
(Peru) Sporting Cristal	4
(Peru) Sport Boys	0
(Peru) Sport Coopsol	2
(Paraguay) Universidad Autónoma	1

Finals
(Peru) Sporting Cristal	2
(Peru) Sport Coopsol	0

=== Quarterfinals ===
12 March 2000	Sport Boys (Peru)	2–2 (5–3 p)	(Uruguay) Nacional	VIDENA, Lima

12 March 2000	Sporting Cristal (Peru)	5–1	(Argentina) Banfield	VIDENA, Lima

12 March 2000	River Plate (Argentina)	1–4	(Paraguay) Universidad Autónoma	VIDENA, Lima

12 March 2000	Sport Coopsol (Peru)	3–3 (3–1 p)	(Ecuador) Todas Estrellas	VIDENA, Lima

=== Semifinals ===
15 March 2000	Sport Boys (Peru)	0–4	(Peru) Sporting Cristal	Estadio San Martín, Lima

15 March 2000	Universidad Autónoma (Paraguay)	1–2	(Peru) Sport Coopsol	Estadio San Martín, Lima

=== Third Place ===
18 March 2000	Sport Boys (Peru)	1–1 (4–3 p)	(Paraguay) Universidad Autónoma	Estadio Nacional, Lima

=== Final ===
18 March 2000	Sporting Cristal (Peru)	2–0	(Peru) Sport Coopsol	Estadio Nacional, Lima
