= Marlboro Cup (soccer) =

- Founded: 1987
- Abolished: 1990; 36 years ago
- Region: United States
- Teams: 4
- Last champion: (Brazil) Flamengo
- Most championships: United States (2 titles)

The Marlboro Cup was an international soccer tournament which ran on an irregular basis from 1987 to 1990 in the United States.

Sponsored by the Philip Morris company to promote its Marlboro brand of cigarettes, the tournament featured both top club as well as national teams.

== List of champions ==
Ed.	Year	Month	Host city	Champions	Final score	Runners-up
1	1987	March	Miami	(Colombia) Millonarios	3–1	United States
2	1988–I	March	Miami	(Colombia) Atlético Nacional	3–2	United States
3	1988–II	April	San Antonio	(Mexico) UdeG	1–0	(Mexico) UNAM
4	1988–III	Aug	Los Angeles	Guatemala	3–2	(Mexico) UdeG
5	1988–IV	Aug	New York	(Peru) Sporting Cristal	4–0	(Ecuador) Barcelona
6	1989–I	April	Miami	(Colombia) Santa Fe	0–0 (3–0 p)	United States
7	1989–II	June	New York	United States	3–0	Peru
8	1989–III	July	Chicago	United States	1–1 (5–3 p)	(Mexico) Guadalajara
9	1989–IV	August	Los Angeles	Mexico	3–2	(Italy) Juventus
10	1990–I	February	Miami	Uruguay	2–0	Costa Rica
11	1990–II	February	Los Angeles	Colombia	1–0	(Mexico) Guadalajara
12	1990–III	May	Chicago	(Mexico) Atlas	0–0 (4–1 p)	Colombia
13	1990–IV	August	New York	(Brazil) Flamengo	1–0	(Peru) Alianza Lima

== Sources ==
- History
- Miami Cup
