= 1991 Copa Independencia (Peru) =

Tournament details
- Dates: 19 May – 22 May 1991
- Teams: 4

Final positions
- Champions: (Argentina) San Lorenzo (1st title)
- Runners-up: (Peru) Sporting Cristal

Tournament statistics
- Matches played: 4
- Goals scored: 12 (3 per match)
- Top scorer: (Argentina) Adrián Czornomaz (3 goals)

The Copa Independencia, also called Copa Independencia de la República Argentina was an international exhibition football tournament held in Lima, Peru, during the break caused by the 1991 Copa América. All matches were played at the Estadio Nacional and Estadio Alejandro Villanueva in Lima. San Lorenzo were the champions.

== Qualified teams ==
Country	Team
Argentina; 2 berth	Newell's Old Boys
Argentina; 2 berth	San Lorenzo
Peru; 2 berths	Alianza Lima
Peru; 2 berths	Sporting Cristal

== Match results ==
=== Semifinals ===
19 May 1991
13:30

Sporting Cristal (Peru)	2–1	(Argentina) Newell's Old Boys
Julio César Antón 87'; Mauricio Pochettino 90' (o.g.)		Ricardo Lunari 8'

Estadio Alejandro Villanueva, Lima
Referee: Luis Seminario

19 May 1991
15:30

Alianza Lima (Peru)	2–2	(Argentina) San Lorenzo
Marco Valencia 30'; Ricardo Cano 75'		Adrián Czornomaz 73' 80'

Estadio Alejandro Villanueva, Lima
Attendance: 7,012
Referee: Alberto Tejada Jr.

Alianza Lima and San Lorenzo drew 2–2. However, San Lorenzo advanced to the final as the away team..

=== Third place ===
22 May 1991
18:00

Alianza Lima (Peru)	0–4	(Argentina) Newell's Old Boys
		Juan Carlos Roldán 22'; Ariel Cozzoni 45+4' 48'; Fabián Garfagnoli 64'

Estadio Nacional, Lima
Referee: Carlos Hernández

=== Final ===
22 May 1991
20:00

Sporting Cristal (Peru)	0–1	(Argentina) San Lorenzo
		Adrián Czornomaz 12'

Estadio Nacional, Lima
Attendance: 10,691
Referee: Alfonso Postigo
