= 1990 Marlboro Cup (New York) =

The 1990 Marlboro Cup was a four team soccer tournament hosted at the Giants Stadium in August. The four teams competing were Alianza Lima, Flamengo, Sporting CP and United States. The tournament was won by Flamengo who beat Alianza Lima 1–0 in the final; the game's only goal was scored by Gaúcho.

Flamengo earned 50.000 USD for playing both matches in the tournament.

== Matches ==
Date	Team #1	Result	Team #2	Round
August 10	(Peru) Alianza Lima	1–0	(Portugal) Sporting CP	Semi-finals
August 10	(Brazil) Flamengo	1–0	United States	Semi-finals
August 12	United States	2–1	(Portugal) Sporting CP	Third Place Match
August 12	(Brazil) Flamengo	1–0	(Peru) Alianza Lima	Final

1990 New York Marlboro Cup Champions

Flamengo
