= 1988 Marlboro Cup (New York) =

The 1988 Marlboro Cup was a four team soccer tournament hosted at the Giants Stadium in August. The four teams competing were Atlético Nacional, Barcelona, Benfica and Sporting Cristal. The tournament was won by Sporting Cristal who beat Barcelona 4–0 in the final.

== Matches ==
Date	Team #1	Result	Team #2	Round
August 10	(Peru) Sporting Cristal	1–1 (6–5 p)	(Portugal) Benfica	Semi-finals
August 10	(Ecuador) Barcelona	0–0 (7–6 p)	(Colombia) Atlético Nacional	Semi-finals
August 12	(Portugal) Benfica	3–2	(Colombia) Atlético Nacional	Third Place Match
August 12	(Peru) Sporting Cristal	4–0	(Ecuador) Barcelona	Final

1988 New York Marlboro Cup Champions

Sporting Cristal
