= Pablo Zegarra =

Peruvian retired footballer (born 1973)

Personal information
- Full name: Pablo César Zegarra Zamora
- Date of birth: 1 April 1973 (age 53)
- Place of birth: Lima, Peru
- Height: 1.78 m (5 ft 10 in)
- Position: Midfielder

Senior career*
Years	Team	Apps	(Gls)
1991	Sporting Cristal		
1992–1994	Independiente Santa Fe		
1994–1995	Argentinos Juniors	4	(0)
1995–1996	Badajoz	33	(10)
1996–2003	Salamanca	149	(24)
1998	→ Sporting Cristal (loan)	17	(2)
2000–2001	→ Farense (loan)	17	(1)
2003–2004	Alianza Lima		
2004–2005	Guijuelo	10	(0)
2007	Universitario	5	(0)

International career
1993–1999	Peru	31	(1)

Managerial career
- 2006–2009: Salamanca (youth)
- 2010–2011: Salamanca (assistant)
- 2011–2012: Salamanca
- 2014: Sporting Cristal (youth)
- 2015–2017: Sporting Cristal (reserves)
- 2017: Sporting Cristal
- 2019: Molinos El Pirata
- 2020: Atlético Grau
- 2023–2024: Peru U17
- * Club domestic league appearances and goals

Pablo César Zegarra Zamora (born 1 April 1973) is a Peruvian retired footballer who played as a midfielder, and is a manager.

Most of his career was associated with Salamanca in Spain, as both a player and a manager. He played in two La Liga seasons with the club, in the late 1990s. He gained 31 caps for Peru; his younger brother Carlos also played for the national team.

== Club career ==
Born in the capital Lima, Zegarra started his career in 1991 with Sporting Cristal, moving just one year after to Colombia with Independiente de Santa Fe. He changed countries again in 1994, experiencing one unassuming spell at Argentinos Juniors.

In the following summer, Zegarra arrived in Spain, where he would remain for the following eight years, only interrupted with two loans spells: after a solid season in Segunda División for CD Badajoz, he signed with UD Salamanca in the same level, scoring eight times in 30 games in his debut season en route to a La Liga promotion – in the following two top division campaigns, however, he would be sparingly used (23 matches combined, two goals).

After the second of his two loans, in Portugal with S.C. Farense, Zegarra was released by Salamanca in the 2003 summer, returning to his country to play for Club Alianza Lima. However, he returned to Spain shortly afterwards, representing amateurs CD Guijuelo. Following a period of inactivity, he quit football altogether in 2007 at 34, his last club being also in Lima, Universitario de Deportes.

Zegarra returned to Salamanca after his retirement, starting his coaching career. In November 2011 the 38-year-old was appointed first-team manager, with the side competing in Segunda División B.

== International career ==
During six years, Zegarra won 31 caps for the Peru national team, scoring once. He was summoned for the squad at the 1993 Copa América.
