= 2021 U-18 Copa Generación =

Copa Generación
- Season: 2021
- Dates: 27 September – 30 November 2021
- Country: Peru
- Teams: 12
- Champions: Sporting Cristal
- Runner up: Alianza Lima
- 2022 U-20 Copa Libertadores: Sporting Cristal

The Copa Generación was a U-18 youth football league in Peru for the Peruvian football teams in the Liga 1 and Liga 2. Sporting Cristal were crowned champions after defeating Alianza Lima 4–2 on penalties in the final.

The tournament began on September 27 with the regular stage and concluded on November 30 with the final that determined the champion. The competition was partially streamed through the official application of the Peruvian Football Federation. The champion qualified for the 2022 U-20 Copa Libertadores.

== Competition system ==
The championship consisted of two stages: an initial stage and a final stage. Due to the health restrictions caused by the COVID-19 pandemic, the entire tournament was played exclusively in the city of Lima.

In the first stage, the 12 teams faced each other in a single round-robin format, with each club playing a total of 11 matches, for an overall total of 66 games in this stage. Subsequently, in the final stage, the top two teams in the standings from the first stage advanced directly to the semifinals, while the teams placed third through sixth competed in a playoff round to qualify for the semifinals. Finally, the semifinal winners faced each other in the final to determine the champion. All rounds in this stage were played as single-match ties.

Regarding the youth minutes rule, clubs were required to accumulate at least 90 minutes per match with players born in 2003 or later. In addition, each club was allowed to include up to two foreign players born in 2002 within the list of 18 players called up for each match.

== Teams ==
=== Stadia and locations ===
Locations of the 2021 Copa Generación teams

Team	City
Alianza Lima	Lima
Ayacucho	Ayacucho
Cantolao	Callao
Comerciantes Unidos	Cutervo
Deportivo Municipal	Lima
Pirata	Olmos
Regatas Lima	Lima
Sport Boys	Callao
Sporting Cristal	Lima
Universidad César Vallejo	Trujillo
Universidad San Martín	Lima
Universitario	Lima

== First stage ==
=== Standings ===
Pos	Team	Pld	W	D	L	GF	GA	GD	Pts	Qualification
1	Sporting Cristal	11	8	3	0	33	7	+26	27	Advance to Semifinals
2	Alianza Lima	11	7	3	1	28	15	+13	24	Advance to Semifinals
3	Academia Cantolao	11	7	2	2	25	11	+14	23	Advance to Repechajes
4	Universidad César Vallejo	11	7	2	2	22	10	+12	23	Advance to Repechajes
5	Pirata	11	5	4	2	17	6	+11	19	Advance to Repechajes
6	Deportivo Municipal	11	5	3	3	14	12	+2	18	Advance to Repechajes
7	Universitario	11	4	2	5	18	10	+8	14	
8	Regatas Lima	11	3	3	5	10	29	−19	12	
9	Universidad San Martín	11	2	2	7	18	29	−11	8	
10	Ayacucho	11	0	6	5	11	22	−11	6	
11	Sport Boys	11	0	3	8	10	30	−20	3	
12	Comerciantes Unidos	11	0	3	8	12	37	−25	3	

Rules for classification: 1) points; 2) goal difference; 3) goals scored; 4) draw.

=== Results ===
Home \ Away	ALI	AYA	CAN	COM	MUN	PIR	REG	SBA	SCR	UCV	USM	UNI
Alianza Lima		2–1	2–1	3–2		0–0				2–3	5–2	
Ayacucho						1–5						
Academia Cantolao		2–0		4–3		1–0		3–1		1–2		2–0
Comerciantes Unidos		1–1										
Deportivo Municipal	0–2	1–1	2–2	1–1		1–0		3–1	0–1		3–2	1–0
Pirata				5–0								
Regatas Lima	2–7	2–2	0–4	1–0	1–0	1–1		1–0		0–3	2–2	
Sport Boys	2–3	3–3		0–0		0–1						
Sporting Cristal	2–2	2–1	1–1	6–1		0–0	5–0	8–1			4–1	2–0
Universidad César Vallejo		3–0		6–1	1–2	1–1		0–0	0–2			
Universidad San Martín		1–1	0–4	5–1		0–2		4–2		1–2		0–3
Universitario	0–0	0–0		5–2		1–2	5–0	4–0		0–1		

Source: FPF
Legend: Blue = home team win; Yellow = draw; Red = away team win.

== Final stage ==
=== Bracket ===
Repechaje
4	Universidad César Vallejo	1
5	Pirata	2
3	Academia Cantolao	2
6	Deportivo Municipal	1

Semi-finals
1	Sporting Cristal	2
5	Pirata	1
2	Alianza Lima	1
3	Academia Cantolao	0

Final
1	Sporting Cristal	1 (4)
2	Alianza Lima	1 (2)

=== Repechajes ===
22 November 2021	Academia Cantolao	2–1	Deportivo Municipal	Villa Deportiva Nacional, Lima
09:30	Kevin Medina 2'; Chase Villanueva 75'		Claudio Robatti 81'	Referee: Ítalo Gonzales

22 November 2021	Universidad César Vallejo	1–2	Pirata	Villa Deportiva Nacional, Lima
13:30	Piero Ferreira 9'		David Monserrate 36'; Alessandro Valcárcel 88'	Referee: Jesse Flores

=== Semifinals ===
26 November 2021	Sporting Cristal	2–1	Pirata	Villa Deportiva Nacional, Lima
09:30	Roy Rodríguez 6' (o.g.); Marlon Perea 27'		Luis Duque 37'	Referee: Julio Quiroz

26 November 2021	Alianza Lima	1–0	Academia Cantolao	Villa Deportiva Nacional, Lima
13:30	Juan Pablo Goicochea 83'			Referee: César García

=== Final ===
30 November 2021	Sporting Cristal	1–1 (4–2 p)	Alianza Lima	Villa Deportiva Nacional, Lima
10:00	Gilmar Paredes 31'		Christian Valladolid 90+4'	Referee: Alexander Blas
	Penalties
	Joshua Cantt (penalty scored); Flavio Alcedo (penalty scored); Leonardo Díaz (penalty scored); Marlon Perea (penalty scored)		Carlos Montoya (penalty scored); Paulo Mesías (penalty scored); José Arrasco (penalty missed); Jorge Del Castillo (penalty missed)
