= Sporting Cristal =

- Full name: Club Sporting Cristal
- Nicknames: Los Cerveceros; Los Rimenses; Los Celestes; La Fuerza Vencedora
- Founded: December 13, 1955
- Stadium: Estadio Alberto Gallardo
- Owner: Innova Sports
- President: Joel Raffo
- Manager: Roberto Mosquera
- League: Liga 1
- 2025: Liga 1, 4th of 19
- Website: www.clubsportingcristal.pe
Home colours	Away colours	Third colours

Club Sporting Cristal is a Peruvian sports club located in the city of Lima, best known for its football team. It was founded on 13 December 1955 in the Rímac district by engineer Richard Bentín Mujica and his wife Esther Grande de Bentín, stockholders of the Peruvian brewery Backus and Johnston. The club and the brewery have been closely linked since its inception, and it is for this reason that it is popularly known as los Cerveceros ("the brewers").

The team has played in the Peruvian Primera División since 1956, where it obtained the title that year. Due to this achievement, Cristal is often referred to as "El club que nació campeón". Since their first participation, they have won the league title 19 times and are one of the few teams in Peru to have never been relegated from the top division. Sporting Cristal is also the first Peruvian team to have been crowned tricampeón, successively winning the 1994, 1995, and 1996 seasons. In 1997, they were runners-up of the Copa Libertadores, losing the final to Brazilian side Cruzeiro. Cristal holds the second longest undefeated streak in the tournament; 17 games without suffering a loss.

Cristal has a heated rivalry with Universitario de Deportes. One of the main reasons for the enmity between the two sides is the series of transfers of Universitario's star players to los Celestes. The club also has rivalries with Club Alianza Lima, Deportivo Municipal, and the Sport Boys.

Sporting Cristal plays its home games at the Estadio Alberto Gallardo. They play at the Estadio Nacional for international competitions such as the Libertadores or Sudamericana. The Estadio Nacional is also the venue for matches against Universitario and Alianza Lima.

In addition to football, the club has teams specializing in Esports, futsal, women's football, and volleyball.

== History ==
Ricardo Bentín Mujica, with the support of his wife, co-owners of Backus and Johnston brewery, was the man who is credited with achieving the company's goal. A club from Rímac ward, known as Sporting Tabaco founded in 1926 and originally belonging to the tobacco growers' union, was already playing in the professional Peruvian First Division. Never having won a national championship, the club was in dire economic straits. Bentín decided to buy the club and search for a playing ground, so that the club could develop and be able to play better at the professional level. The club found a lot in the neighborhood of La Florida of 137,000 m^{2}.

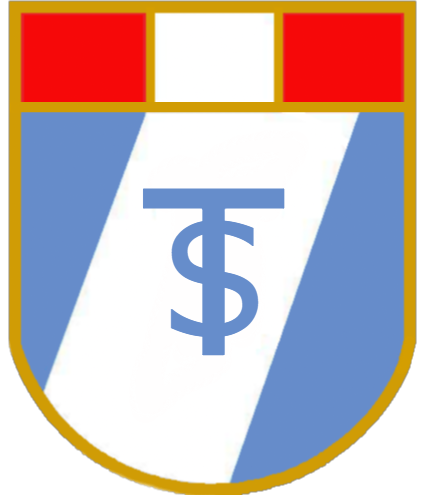
Sporting Tabaco 1926–1955

On 13 December 1955 the club was founded as Sporting Cristal, after Backus' best-known beer brand, Cristal. The new club from the Rímac ward debuted in 1956 in the professional Primera Division and won their first national title that same year. Journalists thus called them the club born a champion (nació campeon). The team managed to win more titles over the years and was known as one of the best football clubs in Peru after Universitario and Alianza Lima.

Even before its foundation, the Sporting Cristal Backus project had more than one opponent: articles from the time point out how certain sports journalists and football clubs viewed with displeasure that a team was financed by a private company. Even the Peruvian Football Federation itself put legal obstacles in the way of the team before and after its merger; until March 1956 the FPF did not authorize the team's participation in that year's championship, arguing from the prohibition of advertising in the clubs to the fact that they should have names of national heroes, places or institutions of the country. Various legal outlets were used for the impositions of the Federation, however, the controversy did not end until 1968, when the word "Backus" was finally removed from the club's name.

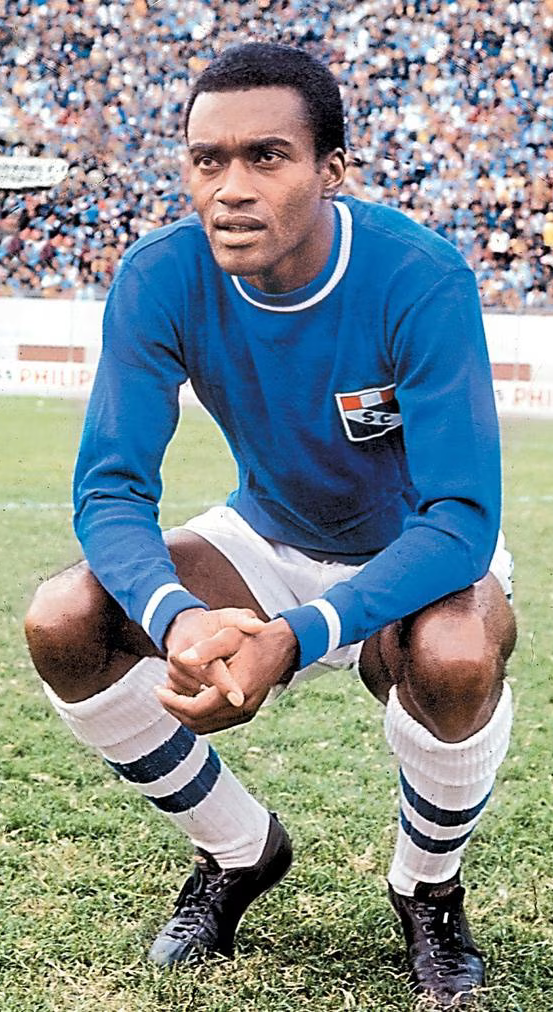
Alberto Gallardo, Cristal's most historic player, achieving 4 titles with the club

As a champion of Peru in 1956 and 1961, Cristal was invited to tour various parts of the world in 1962, this being the first tour made by a champion team of Peru. The series of matches began in the United States, continued through several Asian cities such as Kuala Lumpur, Malacca City and Tehran, and culminated in Spain. There were a total of 30 matches played over two months, of which 20 were won, 7 were drawn and there were only 3 defeats. The star of this tour was Alberto Gallardo, who scored 37 goals. The club shook up the market again when they signed the legendary Brazilian player, Didí in 1962, a world-famous footballer who had just won the 1962 World Cup title with his national team. Didí arrived to be the team's coach and implemented the attacking and possession style of play characteristic of Brazil's football. The Brazilian formed an eye-catching team that used to provide a show, however, he had to settle only for the runners-up in 1962 and 1963.

After retiring from football, Didí returned to take over the technical direction of the club for 1967, again obtaining the runner-up position that year. The revenge came the following season, in which Sporting Cristal obtained the highest score along with the Juan Aurich club, due to this the champion of the Descentralizado 1968 had to be defined in an extra match in which the brewers were victorious 2–1 thanks to two goals by Alberto Gallardo. In addition to its local titles, the young institution gained prestige for its international performances. During the 1962 edition until the 1969 edition of the Copa Libertadores, Sporting Cristal went on a 17-game undefeated streak, the longest unbeaten streak in the Copa Libertadores history, winning 8 games, and drawing 9.

The following years would bring new titles, the first of them in 1970, under the technical direction of the Argentine Vito Andrés Bártoli, in a tournament that was hard fought with Universitario de Deportes and that was defined in the Final Liguilla of the tournament. In this last stage, Cristal had the best performance and the highest accumulated score, thus winning a new title. Their last match was against Juan Aurich, defeating them 4–2.Of the 32 games played that year, the team won 18, drew 9 and lost 5.

Sporting Cristal changed its shirt color from blue to light blue. They are known as "Los Celestes". During a brief period between 1978 and 1981, they again used blue shirts. In 1982 they returned to light blue as the color of the club.

The 1990s were the most successful decade as they claimed 4 national titles (including 3 in a row) with coach Juan Carlos Oblitas. Under Oblitas, Cristal won the 1991, 1994 and 1995 domestic league. Then, guided by Sergio Markarián head coach they won 1996 league. By 1997, the team, led by Uruguayan coach Sergio Markarián, reached the finals of the Copa Libertadores, where they faced the Brazilian club Cruzeiro. The first leg was a home game, in which they ended in a scoreless draw; in the second leg, they lost 1–0. This is the closest Team Peru has come to the Copa Libertadores Final since 1972, when Universitario had a similar fate playing against Independiente.

The club stayed on the top spots of the national tournament during most of the 2000s and gained qualification to the Copa Libertadores eight years in a row from 2000 to 2007. It would only win two titles during the decade which were obtain in 2002 and 2005 with many notable players as Sergio Leal, Jorge Soto and Luis Alberto Bonnet. However, during the 2007, Cristal would come four points away from relegation. It would make a comeback during the 2008 season and qualify to the Copa Libertadores once again.

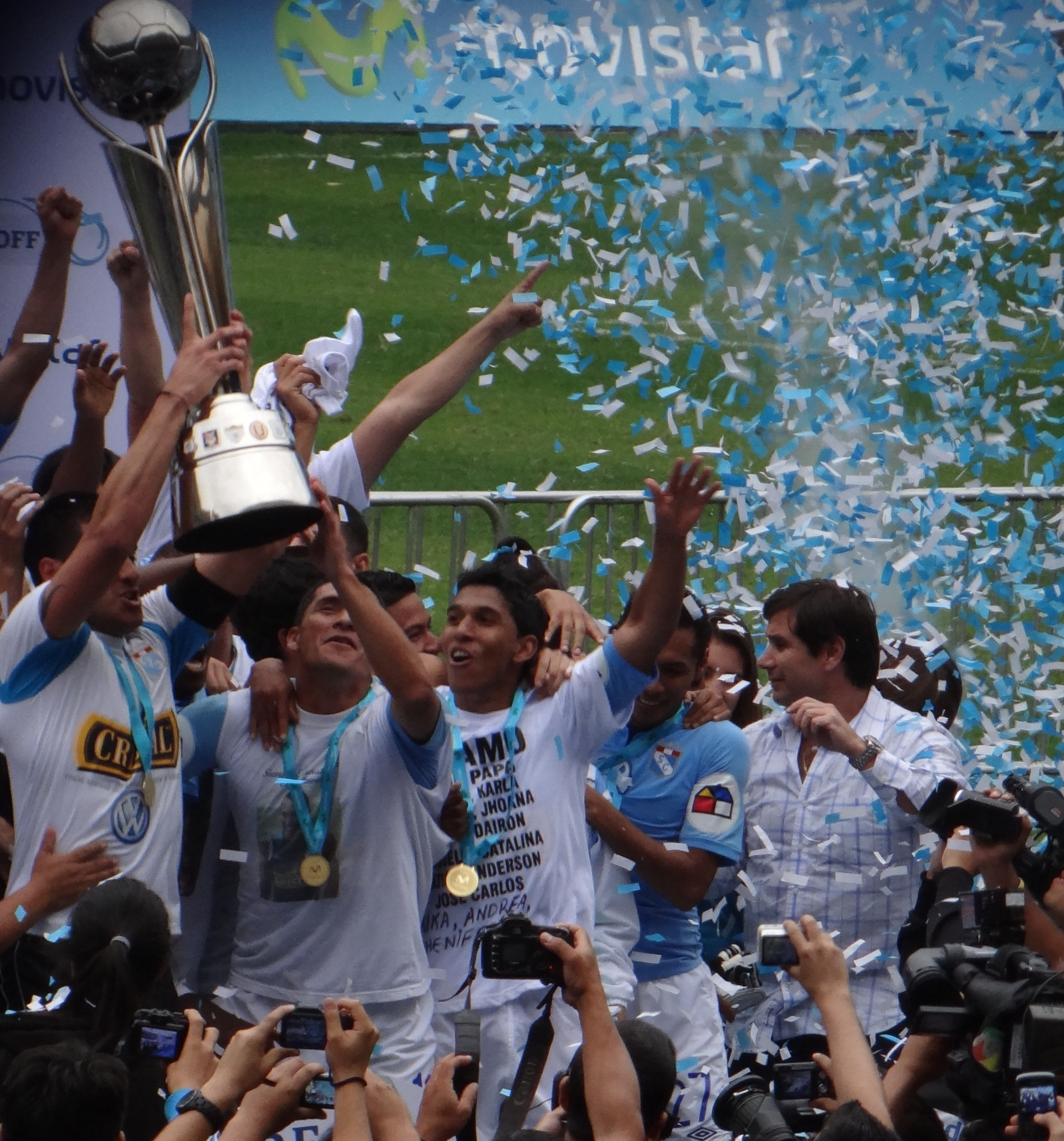
Cristal celebrating their victory in 2012

In 2009, the Primera División Peruana would change the tournament structured which caused Sporting Cristal to have mediocre results for the next few years into the new decade. After a seven-year dry spell it would become the national champion once more during the 2012 season when it defeated Real Garcilaso in the finals. They qualified to the 2013 Copa Libertadores where they did not pass the tournament's group stage. In the 2013 season, they played on the same liguilla as Real Garcilaso and fought for a place in the final up to the last match of the season in which they finished third and qualified for the 2014 Copa Libertadores once more.

In the 2018 season, they conquered another historical feat, they became the best Team Peru in the Historic Table during the Professional Era (1966–2018). As of 2018, they surpassed Universitario for the first spot, 3264 points to Universitario's 3236 points.

In the 2020 season, after a bad start in Liga 1 and Copa Libertadores, the club announced the departure of coach Manuel Barreto, days later Roberto Mosquera returned as technical director after 7 years. Sporting Cristal was unable to play in Phase 3 of the 2020 Copa Libertadores, as they lost 4–0 to Barcelona S.C., but won 2–1 in Lima, as an aggregate result of 5–2 against them. On 12 March, the Torneo Apertura was stopped due to the COVID-19 pandemic in Peru. When the competition returned, the team finished in third place. In the Clausura Tournament they won group A and qualified for the definition against Ayacucho FC, they would be defeated by the foxes in the penalty kicks. Cristal, for being first in the accumulated table, would also play the semifinal with Ayacucho, in the first match they would win 2–1 and in the second they would win again with a resounding 4–1 qualifying for the national final. Sporting Cristal would achieve its twentieth title by beating Universitario in an aggregate of 3–2 in the final.

== Stadium ==
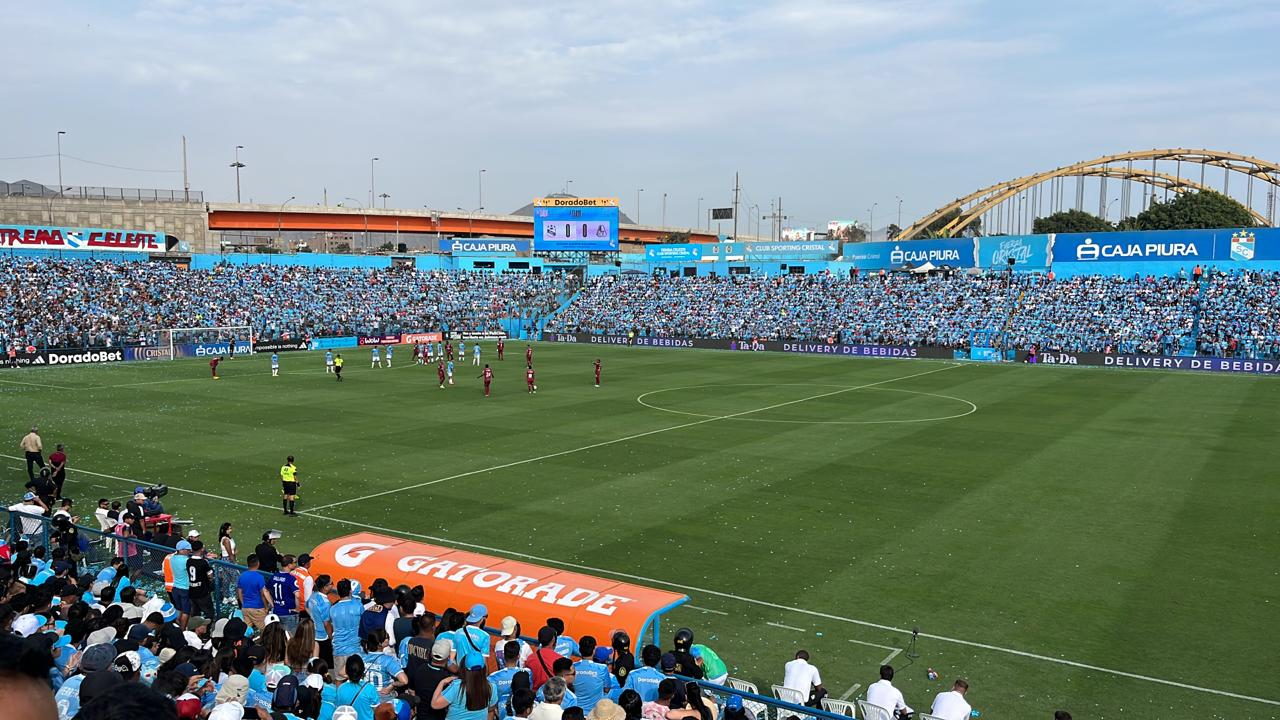
The stadium during a Cristal game

Sporting Cristal plays its matches at home at Estadio Alberto Gallardo, owned by the Peruvian Sports Institute and with the right to use it by the club until 2022.The sports venue is located in the district of San Martín de Porres in Lima; in addition, it is located on the banks of the Rimac River, one of the longest rivers in Peru. The stadium was officially inaugurated on 9 June 1961, with the name of "Estadio Fray Martín de Porres". On 19 May 2012, the former "Estadio San Martín de Porres" was officially renamed "Estadio Alberto Gallardo", in honor of former footballer Alberto Gallardo who was a champion with Sporting Cristal as a footballer and as a coach. On certain occasions, the club plays at the Estadio Nacional del Perú.

== Supporters ==
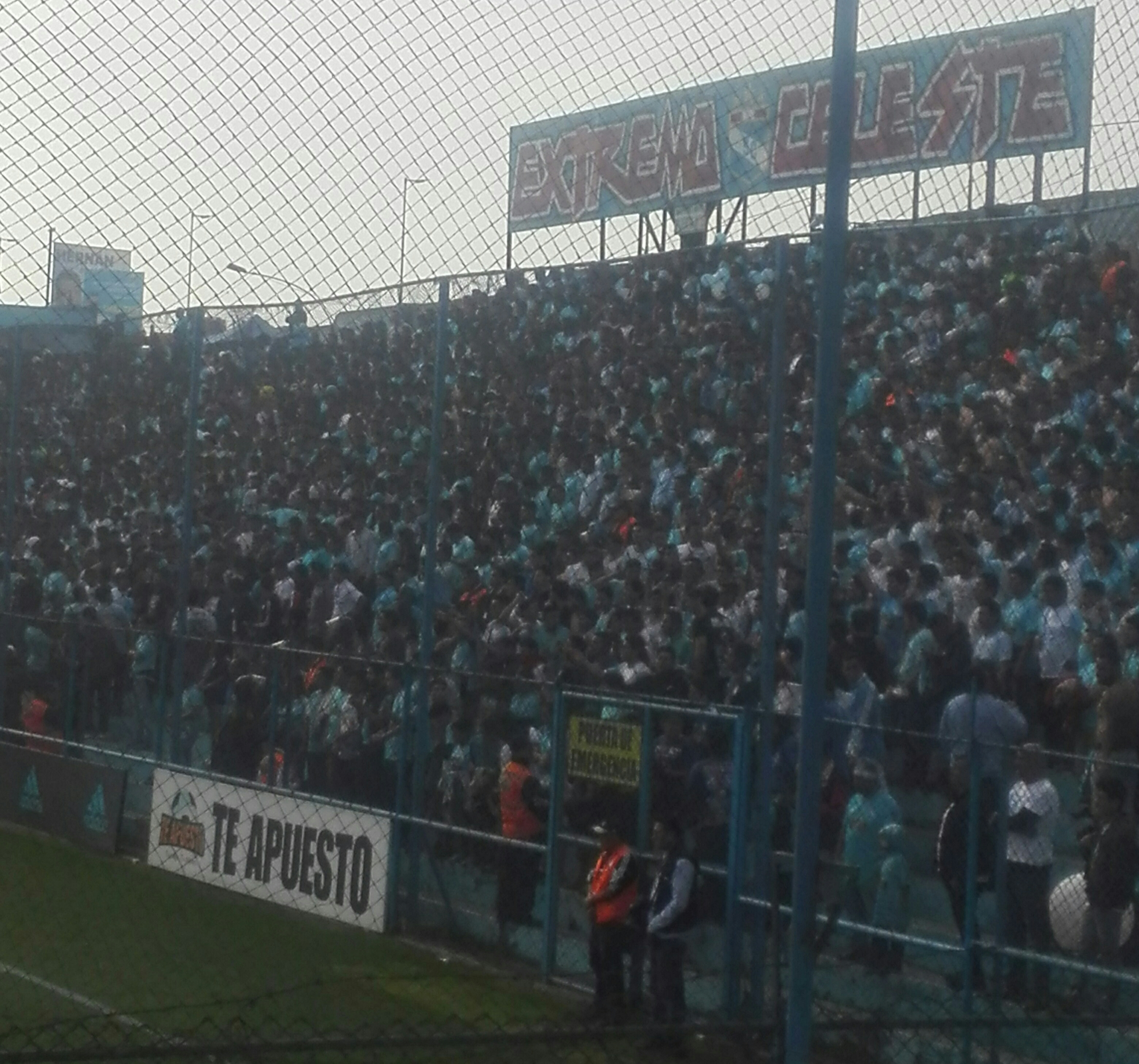
Extremo Celeste in 2018

Sporting Cristal has three ultra groups or barra bravas known as Extremo Celeste, Fverza Oriente Gvardia Xtrema. Fverza Oriente was the first ultra group of Cristal, founded in 1975. They are located on eastern grandstand of the stadiums. Extremo Celeste was formed in 1991 when a group of young fans from Fuerza Oriente decided to form a new group for young energetic supporters. Extremo Celeste has become one of the biggest barras bravas in Peru. And in 2007 a smaller third ultra group was created in the western grandstand to support the team. Sporting Cristal had supporters on every grandstand on Estadio Alberto Gallardo.

== Rivalries ==
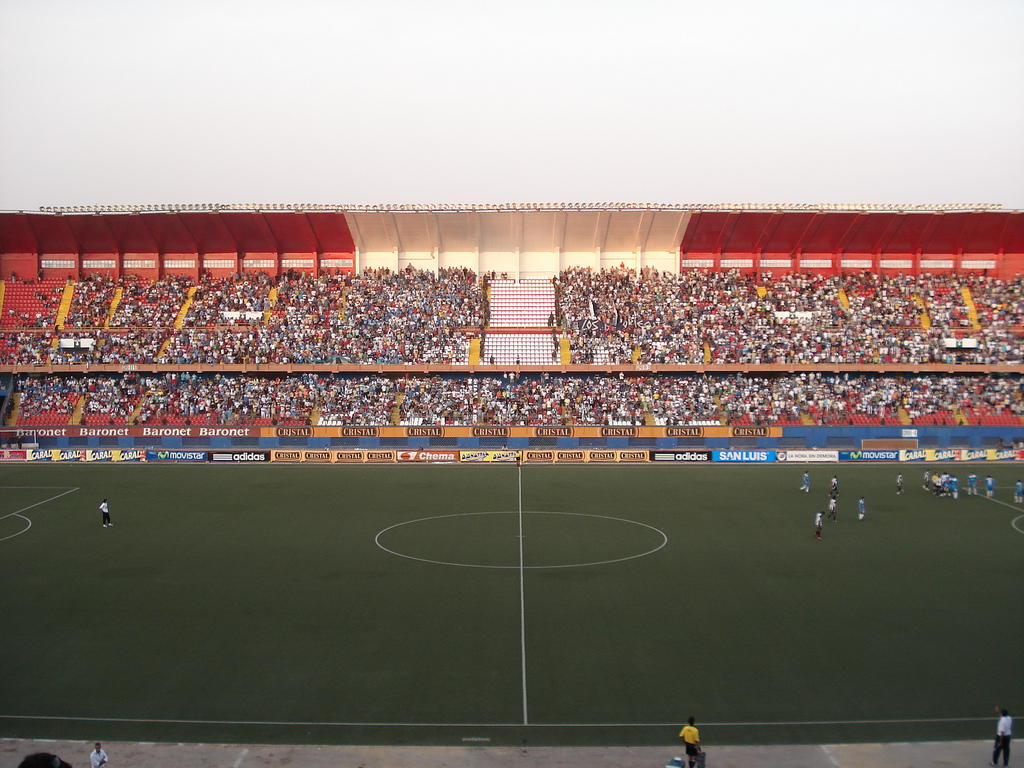
Sporting Cristal vs Alianza Lima in 2009

Sporting Cristal has had longstanding rivalries with Universitario, and Alianza Lima, as these teams are considered the big three of Peruvian football. The matches played between them are called classics and are usually the most attractive of tournaments. Cristal also has rivalries with Deportivo Municipal and Sport Boys, both located in Callao

Sporting Cristal is characterized by the practice of the colorful game, even stipulating it as a condition in the employment contracts of its coaches. Alianza Lima, in the same way, usually plays an offensive style game, so the matches played between these teams are among the most attractive in the tournament, the matches are usually very even. Both teams have defined championships on several occasions, the first of them was in 1961, when Sporting Cristal beat the Alliance 2–0 and was crowned champion. Highlighting the final of the 2018 Torneo Descentralizado, where Cristal won 1–4 away and 3–0 at home, obtaining a resounding aggregate result of 7–1 in favor of the brewers, being the largest final in the history of Peruvian football. The last national championship played between the two teams was in 2021.

Sporting Cristal got its biggest result against Alianza Lima in 1960, after beating them 5–0. On the other hand, their biggest defeat occurred in 2004, when they lost 5–0; although the Celestes played on that occasion with an alternate team. In 1987, Sporting Cristal got its biggest win ever against Alianza away from home, defeating them 4–0 at the Estadio Alejandro Villanueva.That Alianza Lima squad was known as the foals. In the Copa Libertadores the biggest results were two: In 1995 there was a 3–0 win in favor of the Rimense team, while in 1978 they lost by the score of 4–1.

The match played between Sporting Cristal and Universitario de Deportes is one of the most important rivalries in Peru, both clubs are the ones that won the largest number of titles since the Peruvian Primera División began to be played from 1966, giving 18 titles for Sporting Cristal and 16 for Universitario, this succession of championships made there be a great rivalry between both teams, being sporadically called as the Modern Classic of Peruvian Football, although the name was not widespread (before it was associated with the matches between Universitario and Deportivo Municipal).

== Players ==
=== Current squad ===
As of 12 August 2026.

Note: Flags indicate national team as defined under FIFA eligibility rules; some limited exceptions apply. Players may hold more than one non-FIFA nationality.

No.	Pos.	Nation	Player
1	GK	PER	Diego Enríquez
2	DF	PER	Duham Ballumbrosio
4	DF	PER	Anderson Villacorta (on loan from Zacatecas)
5	DF	PER	Rafael Lutiger
7	FW	ARG	Santiago González
8	MF	URU	Leandro Sosa
10	MF	PER	Christofer Gonzáles
11	FW	PER	Irven Ávila
12	GK	PER	Renato Solís
14	MF	PER	Cristian Benavente
16	FW	PER	Luis Iberico
17	DF	PER	Carlos Salgado
18	DF	ARG	Juan González
19	MF	PER	Yoshimar Yotún (captain)
20	DF	PER	Miguel Araujo
21	MF	PER	Catriel Cabellos
22	FW	ARG	Michael Hoyos
23	FW	PER	Maxloren Castro

No.	Pos.	Nation	Player
25	MF	PER	Martín Távara
26	MF	PER	Ian Wisdom
27	MF	BRA	Gabriel
29	FW	ARG	Hernán Barcos
32	DF	PER	Leonardo Díaz
33	GK	PER	César Bautista
34	MF	PER	Yamir del Valle
35	GK	PER	Tomás Dulanto
37	DF	PER	Fabrizio Lora
40	FW	PER	Jair Moretti
41	DF	PER	Joao Cuenca
42	FW	PER	Josemaría Mellán
43	MF	PER	Lionel Herrera
44	MF	PER	Gerson Castillo
77	FW	COL	Juan Manuel Cuesta
90	DF	BRA	Cris Silva
96	DF	PER	Luis Abram
—	MF	URU	Agustín Álvarez (on loan from Montevideo City Torque)

=== Out on loan ===
Note: Flags indicate national team as defined under FIFA eligibility rules; some limited exceptions apply. Players may hold more than one non-FIFA nationality.

No.	Pos.	Nation	Player
15	DF	PER	Alejandro Pósito (at Cajamarca until 31 December 2026)
28	FW	PER	Diego Otoya (at Monterey Bay until 30 November 2026)
97	FW	PER	Mateo Rodríguez (at Juan Pablo II until 31 December 2026)

== Honours ==
=== Senior titles ===
Keys

- Record
- ^{(s)} Shared record

Type	Competition	Titles	Runner-up	Winning years	Runner-up years
National (League)	Liga 1	20	15	1956, 1961, 1968, 1970, 1972, 1979, 1980, 1983, 1988, 1991, 1994, 1995, 1996, 2002, 2005, 2012, 2014, 2016, 2018, 2020	1962, 1963, 1967, 1973, 1977, 1989, 1992, 1997, 1998, 2000, 2003, 2004, 2015, 2021, 2024
Half-year / Short tournament (League)	Torneo Apertura	4	8	2003, 2015, 2018, 2021	1997, 2001, 2006, 2008, 2016, 2019, 2023, 2024
Half-year / Short tournament (League)	Torneo Clausura	6	6	1998, 2002, 2004, 2005, 2014, 2016	2000, 2008, 2020, 2021, 2022, 2026
Half-year / Short tournament (League)	Torneo de Verano	1^{(s)}	—	2018	—
Half-year / Short tournament (League)	Liguilla Pre-Libertadores	2	1	1992, 1997	1993
Half-year / Short tournament (League)	Torneo Apertura	1	—	1994	—
Half-year / Short tournament (League)	Torneo Regional	3	—	1989–I, 1991–I, 1991–II	—
Half-year / Short tournament (League)	Torneo Descentralizado	1	—	1988	—
Half-year / Short tournament (League)	Torneo Zona Metropolitana	1	2	1986	1989–I, 1989–II
Half-year / Short tournament (League)	Torneo Interzonal	1	—	1972 Metropolitano	—
Half-year / Short tournament (League)	Campeonato de Apertura (ANA)	1	2	1961	1957, 1963
National (Cups)	Copa Bicentenario	1^{(s)}	—	2021	—
National (Cups)	Copa de la Liga	1	—	2026	—
International (Cups)	Copa Libertadores	—	1	—	1997

=== Friendlies ===
Type	Competition	Titles	Runner-up	Winning years	Runner-up years
National (Cup)	Cuadrangular de Verano	—	1	—	1990
National (Cup)	Torneo Relámpago	1	1	1956	1961
International (Cup)	Copa El Gráfico-Perú	2	1	1999, 2003	2002–II
International (Cup)	Marlboro Cup	1	—	1988	—
International (Cup)	Copa Independencia	—	1	—	1991

=== Youth team ===
Type	Competition	Titles	Runner-up	Winning years	Runner-up years
National (League)	Torneo de Promoción y Reservas	4	1	2016, 2018, 2019, 2023	2017
National (League)	Torneo Juvenil Sub-18	1	—	2025	—
Half-year / Short tournament (League)	Copa Modelo Centenario	1	—	2016	—
Half-year / Short tournament (League)	Copa Generación Sub-18	1	—	2021	—
Half-year / Short tournament (League)	Torneo Apertura (Juvenil Sub-18)	1	—	2025	—
Half-year / Short tournament (League)	Torneo Clausura (Juvenil Sub-18)	—	1	—	2025
Half-year / Short tournament (League)	Torneo del Inca (Reservas)	—	1	—	2014
Half-year / Short tournament (League)	Torneo Apertura (Reservas)	3	—	2016, 2017, 2018	—
Half-year / Short tournament (League)	Torneo Clausura (Reservas)	2	1	2016, 2018	2015
Half-year / Short tournament (League)	Torneo de Verano (Reservas)	2	—	2017, 2018	—

== Performance in CONMEBOL competitions ==
- Copa Libertadores: 41 appearances

1962, 1968, 1969, 1971, 1973, 1974, 1978, 1980, 1981, 1984, 1989, 1990, 1992, 1993, 1995, 1996, 1997, 1998, 1999, 2000, 2001, 2002, 2003, 2004, 2005, 2006, 2007, 2009, 2013, 2014, 2015, 2016, 2017, 2019, 2020, 2021, 2022, 2023, 2024, 2025, 2026

Runners-up (1): 1997
Quarter-finals (2): 1993, 1995

- Copa Sudamericana: 5 appearances

2018: First Stage
2019: Round of 16
2021: Quarter-finals
2023: KO play-offs
2026: KO play-offs

- Copa CONMEBOL: 1 appearance

1994: Quarter-finals

- Copa Merconorte: 4 appearances

1998: First Round
1999: First Round
2000: First Round
2001: First Round

- U-20 Copa Libertadores: 5 appearances

2012: Group Stage
2020: Group Stage
2022: Group Stage
2024: Group Stage
2026: Group Stage

== Presidential history ==
Name	Years
Blas Loredo Bascones	1956–59
Alfonso Raul Villegas	1960–63
Augusto Moral Santisteban	1964
Cesar Freundt	1965
Augusto Galvez Velarde	1966–71
Josue Grande Fernandez	1972–79
Jaime Noriega Zegarra	1980–88
Federico Cúneo de La Piedra	1989–93

Name	Years
Francisco Lombardi Oyarzub	1994–95
Alfonso Grados Carraro	1996–99
Francisco Lombardi Oyarzub	2000–01
Jaime Noriega Bentin	2002–04
François Mujica Serelle	2005–10
Felipe Cantuarias Salaverry	2011–14
Federico Cúneo de La Piedra	2014–2018
Carlos Benavides	2019
Cristian Emmerich	2019–

== Records ==
=== Year-by-year ===
This is a partial list of the last five seasons completed by Sporting Cristal. For the full season-by-season history, see: List of Sporting Cristal seasons.

Season	League								Position		National Cups		Continental / Other		Tournament Top goalscorer(s)	
Season	Competition	Pld	W	D	L	GF	GA	Pts	Pos	Play-offs (Note: Since 1966, play-off games have been used as a tie breaker between teams tie on points for promotion or relegation or as a post-season stage to decide the national championship. Whenever they have occurred, the club's position on that stage is shown in this column.)	National Cups		Continental / Other		Name(s)	Goals
2016	Torneo Descentralizado	44	21	12	11	70	48	77 (Note: Sporting Cristal were awarded 2 point for 2016 Torneo de Promoción y Reserva success.)	1st	1st	—	—	Copa Libertadores	GS	—	—
2017	Torneo de Verano	14	6	4	4	27	16	22	3rd	DNQ	—	—	Copa Libertadores	GS	(Peru) Irven Ávila	22
2017	Torneo Apertura	15	6	5	4	22	20	23	7th	DNQ	—	—	Copa Libertadores	GS	(Peru) Irven Ávila	22
2017	Torneo Clausura	15	5	3	7	27	24	19 (Note: Sporting Cristal were awarded 1 point for 2017 Torneo de Promoción y Reserva success.)	9th	DNQ	—	—	Copa Libertadores	GS	(Peru) Irven Ávila	22
2018	Torneo de Verano	14	10	3	1	42	15	33	1st	1st (Note: Sporting Cristal defeated Sport Huancayo in the Torneo de Verano finals.)	DNQ	—	Copa Sudamericana	R1	(Argentina) Emanuel Herrera	40
2018	Torneo Apertura	15	9	5	1	27	7	32	1st	1st	DNQ	—	Copa Sudamericana	R1	(Argentina) Emanuel Herrera	40
2018	Torneo Clausura	15	7	3	5	37	14	24	5th	1st	DNQ	—	Copa Sudamericana	R1	(Argentina) Emanuel Herrera	40
2019	Torneo Apertura	17	9	5	3	28	13	32	2nd	3rd	Copa Bicentenario	QF	Copa Libertadores Copa Sudamericana	GS Ro16	(Uruguay) Cristian Palacios	13
2019	Torneo Clausura	17	9	4	4	31	20	31	3rd	3rd	Copa Bicentenario	QF	Copa Libertadores Copa Sudamericana	GS Ro16	(Uruguay) Cristian Palacios	13
2020	Torneo Apertura	19	9	6	4	38	23	33	3rd	1st (Note: Sporting Cristal defeated Universitario in the play-off finals.)	Copa Bicentenario	— (Note: The Copa Bicentenario was canceled due to the COVID-19 pandemic.)	Copa Libertadores	R2	(Argentina) Emanuel Herrera	20
2020	Torneo Clausura	9	7	2	0	20	9	23	2nd (Note: Sporting Cristal lost the Clausura playoff to Ayacucho.)	1st	Copa Bicentenario	—	Copa Libertadores	R2	(Argentina) Emanuel Herrera	20

== Managerial history ==
List of Sporting Cristal managers through club history.

Years	Nationality	Name
1956–58	(Chile)	Luis Tirado
1958–59	(Argentina)	César Viccino
1960	(Argentina)	Carlos Peucelle
1960	(Peru)	Víctor Pasache
1961–62	(Peru)	Juan Honores
1962	(Peru)	Víctor Pasache
1962–64	(Brazil)	Waldir Pereira "Didí"
1964–66	(Peru)	Alberto "Toto" Terry
1966	(Brazil)	Yaldo Barbalho
1967–69	(Brazil)	Waldir Pereira "Didí"
1969	(Peru)	Víctor Pasache
1969–70	(Argentina)	Vito Andrés "Sabino" Bártoli
1971	(Germany)	Rudi Gutendorf
1972–74	(Peru)	Marcos Calderón
1974	(Peru)	Rafael Asca
1974–75	(Peru)	Eloy Campos
1976	(Peru)	Juan Honores
1976	(Peru)	Víctor Pasache
1976–77	(Peru)	Diego Agurto
1977	(Peru)	Alberto Gallardo
1977–78	(Uruguay)	Roque Máspoli
1978	(Peru)	Alberto Gallardo
1978–79	(Peru)	José Fernández
1979–81	(Peru)	Marcos Calderón
1981–82	(Peru)	Alberto Gallardo
1982–83	(Paraguay)	César Cubilla
1984	(Peru)	José Chiarella
1985	(Peru)	Alberto Gallardo
1985	(Peru)	José del Castillo
1985–86	(Peru)	Héctor Chumpitaz
1987–88	(Peru)	Miguel Company
1988	(Peru)	Óscar Montalvo
1988–89	(Peru)	Alberto Gallardo
1989–90	(Argentina) (Argentina)	Oscar López; Oscar Cavallero
1990	(Peru)	Fernando Mellán
1990	(Chile)	Eugenio Jara
1990–92	(Peru)	Juan Carlos Oblitas
1993	(Brazil)	José Carlos Amaral

Years	Nationality	Name
1993–95	(Peru)	Juan Carlos Oblitas
1996	(Brazil)	José Luis Carbone
1996	(Peru)	Roberto Mosquera
1996–97	(Uruguay)	Sergio Markarián
1997–98	(Chile)	Miguel Ángel Arrué
1998	(Colombia)	Luis García
1998–99	(Peru)	Franco Navarro
1999	(Argentina)	Rodolfo Motta
1999–01	(Peru)	Juan Carlos Oblitas
2001	(Argentina)	Horacio Magalhaes
1 Jan 2002 – 31 Dec 2002	(Brazil)	Paulo Autuori
2003	(Brazil)	Renê Weber
2003–04	(Peru)	Wilmar Valencia
2004	(Peru)	Eduardo Asca
2004–05	(Argentina)	Edgardo Bauza
22 May 2005 – 17 Dec 2006	(Peru)	José del Solar
1 Jan 2007 – 5 May 2007	(Argentina)	Jorge Sampaoli
2007	(Argentina)	Walter Fiori
1 July 2007 – 31 Dec 2009	(Peru)	Juan Carlos Oblitas
1 Jan 2010 – 9 Dec 2010	(Peru)	Víctor Rivera
21 Dec 2010 – 19 April 2011	(Argentina)	Guillermo Rivarola
20 April 2011 – 23 Nov 2011	(Peru)	Juan Reynoso
23 Nov 2011 – 31 Dec 2011	(Peru)	Francisco Melgar
1 Jan 2012 – 7 Aug 2013	(Peru)	Roberto Mosquera
7 Aug 2013 – 18 Aug 2013	(Peru)	Francisco Melgar (int.)
18 Aug 2013 – 19 Dec 2013	(Argentina)	Claudio Vivas
1 Jan 2014–15	(Argentina)	Daniel Ahmed
4 Jan 2016 – 19 Dec 2016	(Argentina)	Mariano Soso
4 Jan 2017 – 25 Jun 2017	(Peru)	José del Solar
25 Jun 2017 – Dic 3, 2017	(Peru)	Pablo Zegarra
4 Jan 2018 – Dic 18, 2018	(Chile)	Mario Salas
7 Jan 2019 – 5 Feb 2019	(Colombia)	Alexis Mendoza
8 Feb 2019 – 10 Sep 2019	(Argentina)	Claudio Vivas
8 Feb 2019 – 10 Sep 2019	(Peru)	Manuel Barreto
23 Feb 2020 – 8 Nov 2022	(Peru)	Roberto Mosquera
9 Nov 2022 – 11 Nov 2023	(Brazil)	Tiago Nunes
24 Nov 2023 – 31 May 2024	(Brazil)	Enderson Moreira
17 Jun 2024 – 10 Apr 2025	(Argentina)	Guillermo Farré
16 Apr 2025 – 25 Mar 2026	(Brazil)	Paulo Autuori

== Other sports ==
=== Women’s football ===
Type	Competition	Titles	Runner-up	Winning years	Runner-up years
National (League)	Liga Femenina	2	3	1998, 1999	1996, 1997, 2000
Half-year / Short; Tournament (League)	Torneo Apertura	1	2	1999	1997–I, 2026
Half-year / Short; Tournament (League)	Torneo Clausura	—	1	—	1997–II
International (Cup)	Campeonato Sudamericano de Fútbol Femenino	1	—	2000	—

==== Youth ====
Type	Competition	Titles	Runner-up	Winning years	Runner-up years
National (League)	Torneo Juvenil Femenino FPF Sub-18	—	1	—	2022
National (League)	Torneo Juvenil Femenino FPF Sub-14	1	1	2025	2022
Regional (League)	Torneo Extraordinario Femenino Sub-20	2	—	2024, 2025	—

=== Women's volleyball ===
Type	Competition	Titles	Runner-up	Winning years	Runner-up years
National (League)	Liga Nacional Superior de Voleibol	—	1	—	2013–14
