= Estadio Ciudad de Cumaná =

Multi-purpose stadium in Ayacucho, Huamanga, Peru

Coordinates: 13.1500°S 74.2167°W

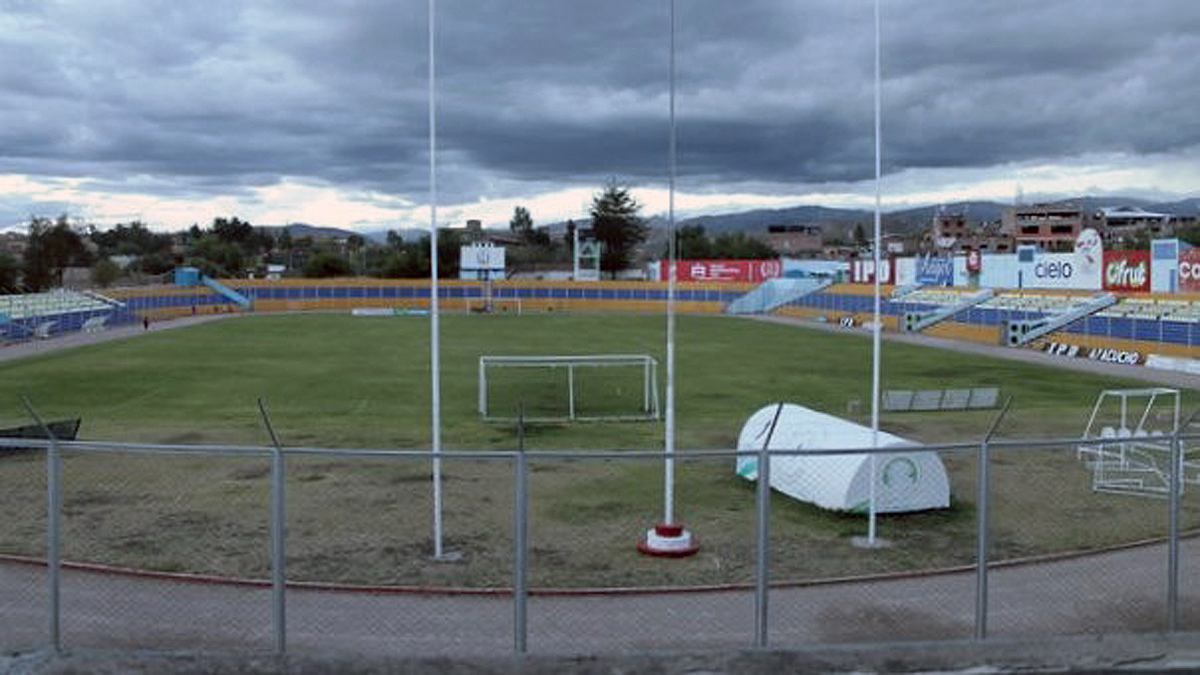
- Interactive map of Estadio Ciudad de Cumaná
- Full name: Estadio Ciudad de Cumaná
- Location: Ayacucho, Huamanga, Peru
- Owner: Instituto Peruano del Deporte
- Capacity: 12,000
- Surface: Grass

Construction
- Opened: 9 December 1974
- Closed: 2024
- Demolished: 2024

Tenants
- Ayacucho FC; Municipal de Huamanga

Estadio Ciudad de Cumaná was a multi-purpose stadium in Ayacucho, Huamanga, Peru. It was used mostly for football matches and was the home stadium of Ayacucho FC of the Peruvian Primera División and Deportivo Municipal de Huamanga of the Copa Perú. The stadium held 12,000 spectators. It was built to commemorate the 150th anniversary of the Battle of Ayacucho by the government of Venezuela under the leadership of Carlos Andrés Pérez. It was named after the city of Cumaná which is the birthplace of Antonio José de Sucre who was the commander of the United Liberation Army during the Battle of Ayacucho. It was part of the larger Complejo Deportivo Venezuela or Venezuela Sports Complex which includes other sporting facilities built by the Venezuelan government.

The stadium was demolished in 2024 in order to make way for the new Estadio Vencedores de Ayacucho and the new sports complex, Complejo Deportivo Los Vencedores de Ayacucho. The new stadium will be complete in 2025 or 2026.
