= Nueva Cajamarca District =

Coordinates: 5.9433°S 77.3415°W

Nueva Cajamarca
- District
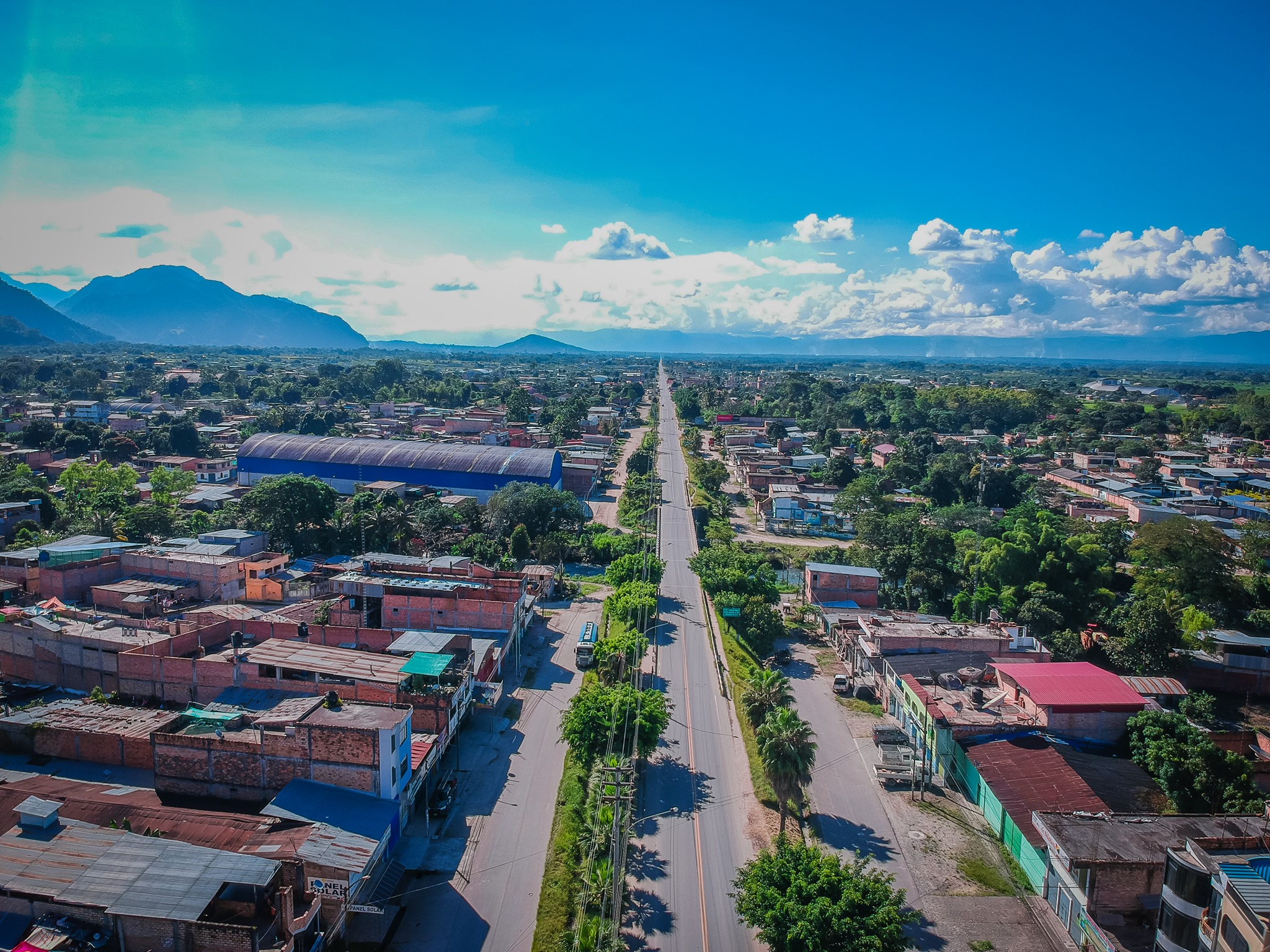
- Interactive map of Nueva Cajamarca
- Country: Peru
- Region: San Martín
- Province: Rioja
- Founded: December 26, 1984
- Capital: Nueva Cajamarca

Government
  - Mayor: Luis Nuñez Sánchez

Area
  - Total: 330.31 km^{2} (127.53 sq mi)
- Elevation: 875 m (2,871 ft)

Population (2005 census)
  - Total: 30,551
  - Density: 92.492/km^{2} (239.55/sq mi)
- Time zone: UTC-5 (PET)
- UBIGEO: 220804

Nueva Cajamarca District is one of nine districts of the province Rioja in Peru.

== History ==
Nueva Cajamarca was established as District on December 26, 1984, during Fernando Belaúnde Terry second term.

== Authorities ==
=== Mayors ===
- 2015-2018: Luis Gilberto Nuñez Sánchez, movimiento Acción Regional.
- 2007-2010: Edy Marcelo Tirado Ramos.
