= Estadio Alberto Gallardo =

Football stadium in Rimac District, Lima, Peru

Coordinates: 12.038°S 77.045°W

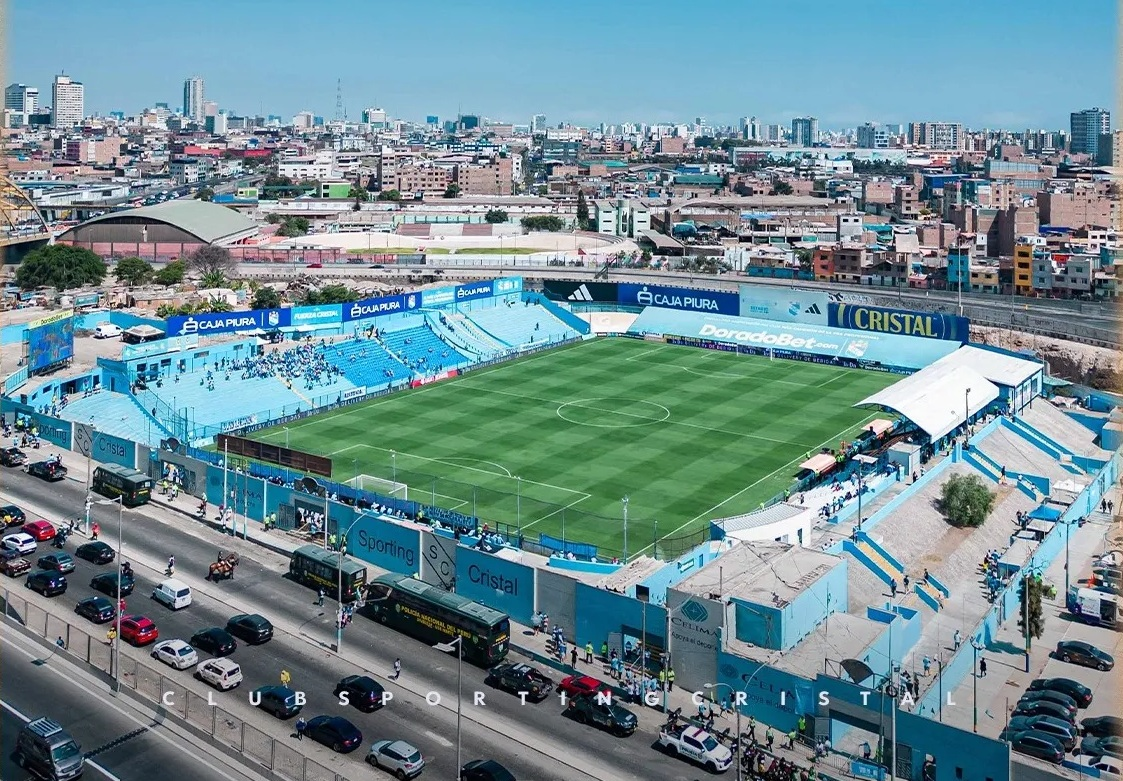
- Interactive map of Estadio Alberto Gallardo
- Location: Lima, Peru
- Owner: Instituto Peruano del Deporte
- Operator: Club Sporting Cristal
- Capacity: 21,000 (1961–1995); 18,000 (1995–2017); 20,000 (2017–2019); 18,000 (2019–2020); 11,600 (2020–present)
- Surface: Grass

Construction
- Opened: June 9, 1961
- Renovated: 1995

Tenant
- Club Sporting Cristal (1995–present)

Estadio Alberto Gallardo is a football stadium in the Rimac District of Lima, Peru, named after Alberto Gallardo, a former Peruvian football player and manager who played for several years for Sporting Cristal. It is the home of football club Sporting Cristal of the Peruvian Primera División. The stadium was built in the 1960s along the Rímac River for local football use and was originally named Estadio San Martín de Porres. Many clubs playing in the Peruvian Primera División, Peruvian Segunda División, and district leagues of San Martín de Porres were among the many tenants the stadium had. In 1995, Sporting Cristal—one of the regular first division tenants of the stadium—decided to lease the venue from the Instituto Peruano del Deporte for 17 years. In 2012 the club signed a new lease contract for 10 years which will expire in 2022. The stadium itself has hosted a few high-risk matches due to the limited access to the stadium and the low capacity of 11,600 seats.

== History ==
The football stadium was built in the 1960s for the practice of association football in Lima. The venue was regularly used for matches in the Segunda División and the district leagues of Lima. In 1979, Sporting Cristal began to host its home matches in the San Martín de Porres and again between 1983 and 1985. In the middle of 1995, Sporting Cristal signed an agreement with the Instituto Peruano de Deportes which would lease the stadium to the club. The club then invested $200,000 in the stadium for renovations which included grass imported from the Netherlands. On September 24, 1995, the stadium re-opened its doors to a first division match between Sporting Cristal and Cienciano, where Cristal defeated Cienciano 6–0.

The stadium had a total capacity of 21,000 spectators in its four stands in the 1960s but it has been reduced to 18,000, then further down to 11,600 due to the safety regulations in the Peruvian 30037 law against violence in sports events. The southern stand overlooks the cliff of the Rímac River. This stand is not open to the public. The restriction of this stand has prevented high-risk matches from being hosted in recent times, notably against rivals Alianza Lima and Universitario de Deportes which are customarily played in the Estadio Nacional. In 2010, Sporting Cristal took advantage of the ongoing renovation of the Estadio Nacional to play rivals Alianza and Universitario in their home stadium. In May 2012, Sporting Cristal was able to legally change the name of the stadium from Estadio San Martín de Porres to Estadio Alberto Gallardo, which is the name of an iconic former player of the club following the signing of the new ten-year lease.

== International Matches ==
Official International Games

Date	Match	Tournament
07/03/2000	(Peru) Sporting Cristal 3-0 Atlético Colegiales (Paraguay)	2000 Copa Libertadores
19/04/2000	(Peru) Sporting Cristal 0-2 América de Cali (Colombia)	2000 Copa Libertadores
10/08/2000	(Peru) Sporting Cristal 2-2 Emelec (Ecuador)	2000 Copa Merconorte
30/08/2000	(Peru) Sporting Cristal 2-1 C.F. Pachuca (Mexico)	2000 Copa Merconorte
14/09/2000	(Peru) Sporting Cristal 5-1 Oriente Petrolero (Bolivia)	2000 Copa Merconorte
01/03/2001	(Peru) Sporting Cristal 0-1 Club Sport Emelec (Ecuador)	2001 Copa Libertadores
18/04/2001	(Peru) Sporting Cristal 3-2 Club Olimpia (Paraguay)	2001 Copa Libertadores
12/09/2001	(Peru) Sporting Cristal 2-1 Sporting Kansas City (United States)	2001 Copa Merconorte
23/10/2001	(Peru) Sporting Cristal 2-1 Club Santos Laguna (Mexico)	2001 Copa Merconorte
22/11/2001	(Peru) Sporting Cristal 2-2 Barcelona (Ecuador)	2001 Copa Merconorte
11/04/2002	(Peru) Sporting Cristal 0- 1 Monarcas Morelia (Mexico)	2002 Copa Libertadores
08/03/2006	(Peru) Sporting Cristal 2-1 Bolivar (Bolivia)	2006 Copa Libertadores
29/01/2009	(Peru) Sporting Cristal 2-1 Estudiantes de La Plata (Argentina)	2009 Copa Libertadores
24/03/2011	Peru 0-3 France	Friendly U-20
28/02/2013	(Peru) Sporting Cristal 2-0 Club Atlético Tigre (Argentina)	2013 Copa Libertadores

== See also ==
- List of football stadiums in Peru
- Lists of stadiums
