= 2010 Peruvian Segunda División =

Peruvian Segunda División
- Season: 2010
- Dates: 5 June – 17 October 2010
- Champions: Cobresol
- Relegated: IDUNSA; Sport Águila; Tecnológico
- Matches: 90
- Top goalscorer: Juan Luna; Ramón Rodríguez (12 goals each)
- Biggest home win: Cobresol 10–0 Tecnológico (September 19, 2010)
- Biggest away win: Tecnológico 1–6 Coopsol
- Highest scoring: Cobresol 10–0 Tecnológico (September 19, 2010)

The 2010 Segunda División season was the 58th edition of the second tier of Federación Peruana de Futbol. There were 10 teams in league play. The champion, Cobresol, was promoted to the 2011 Torneo Descentralizado. The last place, Tecnológico, was relegated to 2011 Copa Perú. The tournament was played on a home-and-away round-robin basis.

In February 2010, IDUNSA signed a strategic alliance with the club Carlos A. Mannucci, by the product of this "strategic alliance" IDUNSA will pass to be called Carlos Mannucci and light up the classical colors of the tricolor. Weeks later, the alliance was canceled due to that the ADFP-SD did not accept the change of headquarters.

On May 28, 2010, IDUNSA and Sport Águila withdrew before the start of the season.

== Teams ==
=== Team changes ===
| Promoted from 2009 Copa Perú | Relegated from 2009 Primera División | Promoted to 2010 Primera División | Relegated to 2010 Copa Perú | Retired |
|---|---|---|---|---|
| ▲ Tecnológico (2nd) | ▼ Sport Áncash (15th) ▼ Coronel Bolognesi (16th) | ▲ Sport Boys (1st) | ▼ Real Academia (11th) ▼ Deportivo Municipal (12th) | ▼IDUNSA (Retired) ▼ Sport Águila (Retired) |

=== Stadia and Locations ===
Locations of the Segunda División 2010 teams

| Team | City | Stadium | Capacity | Field |
|---|---|---|---|---|
| América Cochahuayco | Lima | Monumental | 80,093 | Grass |
| Atlético Minero | Matucana | Municipal de Matucana | 5,000 | Grass |
| Atlético Torino | Talara | Campeonísimo | 8,000 | Grass |
| Cobresol | Moquegua | 25 de Noviembre | 25,000 | Grass |
| Coronel Bolognesi | Tacna | Jorge Basadre | 19,850 | Grass |
| Deportivo Coopsol | Chancay | Rómulo Shaw Cisneros | 13,000 | Grass |
| Hijos de Acosvinchos | Lima | Colegio San Alfonso | 2,000 | Grass |
| Sport Áncash | Huaraz | Rosas Pampa | 18,000 | Grass |
| Tecnológico | Pucallpa | Aliardo Soria Pérez | 15,000 | Artificial |
| Universidad San Marcos | Lima | San Marcos | 43,000 | Grass |

== League table ==
=== Standings ===
| Pos | Team | Pld | W | D | L | GF | GA | GD | Pts | Promotion or relegation |
|---|---|---|---|---|---|---|---|---|---|---|
| 1 | Cobresol (C) | 18 | 12 | 5 | 1 | 36 | 7 | +29 | 41 | 2011 Primera División |
| 2 | Sport Áncash | 18 | 12 | 2 | 4 | 33 | 17 | +16 | 38 | |
| 3 | Hijos de Acosvinchos | 18 | 11 | 3 | 4 | 37 | 22 | +15 | 36 | |
| 4 | Deportivo Coopsol | 18 | 9 | 5 | 4 | 32 | 14 | +18 | 32 | |
| 5 | Coronel Bolognesi | 18 | 6 | 6 | 6 | 28 | 23 | +5 | 24 | |
| 6 | Atlético Minero | 18 | 5 | 5 | 8 | 36 | 37 | −1 | 20 | |
| 7 | Atlético Torino | 18 | 5 | 5 | 8 | 18 | 30 | −12 | 20 | |
| 8 | América Cochahuayco | 18 | 5 | 3 | 10 | 22 | 22 | 0 | 18 | |
| 9 | Universidad San Marcos | 18 | 5 | 2 | 11 | 20 | 27 | −7 | 17 | |
| 10 | Tecnológico (R) | 18 | 2 | 0 | 16 | 9 | 71 | −62 | 6 | 2011 Copa Perú |

Updated to match(es) played on October 17, 2010. Source:
Rules for classification: 1) points; 2) goal difference; 3) number of goals scored.
(C) Champions; (R) Relegated

== Results ==
| Home \ Away | AME | ATM | ATT | COB | BOL | COO | ACO | ÁNC | TEC | USM |
|---|---|---|---|---|---|---|---|---|---|---|
| América Cochahuayco | | 4–1 | 0–1 | 0–0 | 0–0 | 0–1 | 0–1 | 1–3 | 6–0 | 0–1 |
| Atlético Minero | 1–2 | | 1–1 | 0–1 | 3–3 | 2–2 | 1–1 | 2–1 | 5–0 | 0–1 |
| Atlético Torino | 2–1 | 4–3 | | 0–2 | 0–0 | 0–1 | 1–2 | 0–0 | 4–0 | 1–1 |
| Cobresol | 3–1 | 3–1 | 4–0 | | 1–0 | 1–0 | 1–0 | 2–0 | 10–0 | 1–0 |
| Coronel Bolognesi | 3–2 | 2–2 | 0–0 | 2–2 | | 3–2 | 1–2 | 2–1 | 5–1 | 2–0 |
| Deportivo Coopsol | 1–1 | 6–1 | 2–0 | 1–1 | 1–0 | | 2–2 | 0–0 | 3–0 | 3–0 |
| Hijos de Acosvinchos | 2–1 | 2–3 | 4–1 | 0–0 | 3–1 | 1–0 | | 0–3 | 6–0 | 5–1 |
| Sport Áncash | 2–0 | 3–2 | 4–1 | 2–1 | 2–1 | 1–0 | 3–0 | | 3–0 | 2–0 |
| Tecnológico | 0–2 | 0–4 | 1–2 | 0–3 | 2–1 | 1–6 | 2–3 | 0–3 | | 2–0 |
| Universidad San Marcos | 0–1 | 1–4 | 4–0 | 0–0 | 0–2 | 0–1 | 1–3 | 5–1 | 5–0 | |

Updated to match(es) played on October 17, 2010. Source: RSSSF
Legend: Blue = home team win; Yellow = draw; Red = away team win.

== Top goalscorers ==
12 goals

- (Peru) Juan Luna (Hijos de Acosvinchos)
- (Peru) Ramón Rodriguez (Cobresol)

10 goals

- (Peru) Jairsinho Gonzales (Hijos de Acosvinchos)

9 goals

- (Peru) Danfer Doy (Atlético Minero)

7 goals

- (Peru) Cesar Goya (Atlético Minero)
- (Peru) Gustavo Stagnaro (Coronel Bolognesi)
- (Peru) Juan Montenegro (Sport Áncash)
- (Peru) Charly Vicente (Sport Áncash)

6 goals

- (Peru) Roberto Dolorier (Universidad San Marcos)
- (Argentina) Natalio Portillo (Sport Áncash)

5 goals

- (Peru) Lionel Arguedas (Atlético Minero)
- (Peru) Hector Rojas (Cobresol)
- (Peru) Einer Vásquez (Sport Áncash)

== See also ==
- 2010 Torneo Descentralizado
- 2010 Copa Perú
