= 2012 Peruvian Segunda División =

Peruvian Segunda División
- Season: 2012
- Dates: 12 May – 16 September 2012
- Champions: Pacífico
- Relegated: Alianza Unicachi; Hijos de Acosvinchos
- Matches: 90
- Top goalscorer: Jesús Reyes (12 goals)
- Biggest home win: Sport Ancash 5 - 1 Alianza Universidad
- Biggest away win: Atlético Torino 1 - 6 Sport Ancash
- Highest scoring: Sport Ancash 5 - 1 Alianza Universidad; Alianza Universidad 4 - 2 Coronel Bolognesi

The 2012 Segunda División was the 60th edition of the second tier of Federación Peruana de Futbol. The tournament was played on a home-and-away round-robin basis.

- Alianza Atlético, CNI and Universidad San Marcos withdrew before the start of the season, and were replaced by Alianza Universidad and Los Caimanes.
- Alianza Unicachi and Hijos de Acosvinchos were disabled and relegated to the Copa Perú for outstanding debts with the SAFAP.

== Teams ==
=== Team changes ===
Promoted from 2011 Copa Perú	Relegated from 2011 Primera División	Promoted to 2012 Primera División	Relegated to 2012 Copa Perú	Retired
▲ Pacífico (2nd) ▲ Alianza Universidad (3rd) ▲ Los Caimanes (4th)	▼CNI (15th) ▼ Alianza Atlético (16th)	▲ José Gálvez (1st)	▼ U América (10th)	▼CNI (Retired) ▼ Universidad San Marcos (Retired)

=== Stadia and Locations ===
Locations of the 2012 Segunda División teams

Team	City	Stadium	Capacity
Alianza Unicachi	Puno	Enrique Torres Belón	20,000
Alianza Universidad	Huánuco	Heraclio Tapia	15,000
Atlético Minero	Matucana	Municipal de Matucana	5,000
Atlético Torino	Talara	Campeonísimo	8,000
Coronel Bolognesi	Tacna	Jorge Basadre	19,850
Deportivo Coopsol	Chancay	Rómulo Shaw Cisneros	13,000
Hijos de Acosvinchos	Lima	Colegio San Alfonso	2,000
Los Caimanes	Puerto Etén	Elias Aguirre	24,500
Pacífico	Lima	San Martín de Porres	18,000
Sport Áncash	Huaraz	Rosas Pampa	18,000

== League table ==
=== Standings ===
Pos	Team	Pld	W	D	L	GF	GA	GD	Pts	Promotion or relegation
1	Pacífico (C)	18	10	6	2	33	14	+19	36	2013 Primera División
2	Deportivo Coopsol	18	11	2	5	32	17	+15	35	
3	Los Caimanes	18	9	6	3	29	14	+15	33	
4	Sport Áncash	18	11	2	5	39	23	+16	31 (Note: Sport Ancash was docked a total of 4 points for outstanding debts with the SAFAP and because of unpaid salaries to two players.)	
5	Alianza Universidad	18	9	4	5	34	19	+15	31	
6	Atlético Minero	18	9	2	7	25	20	+5	29	
7	Coronel Bolognesi	18	6	1	11	19	33	−14	11 (Note: Coronel Bolognesi was docked a total of 8 points for outstanding debts with the SAFAP.)	
8	Atlético Torino	18	7	2	9	19	24	−5	9 (Note: Atlético Torino was docked a total of 14 points for outstanding debts with the SAFAP.)	
9	Alianza Unicachi (D)	18	4	1	13	11	36	−25	7 (Note: Alianza Unicachi was docked a total of 6 points for outstanding debts with the SAFAP.)	2013 Copa Perú
10	Hijos de Acosvinchos (D)	18	0	0	18	1	51	−50	−8 (Note: Hijos de Acosvinchos was docked a total of 8 points for outstanding debts with the SAFAP.)	2013 Copa Perú

Updated to match(es) played on September 15, 2012. Source: http://www.adfp-sd.com/index.php/estadisticas.html?func=showResultsRank&p=4
Rules for classification: 1) points; 2) goal difference; 3) number of goals scored.
(C) Champions; (D) Disqualified

== Results ==
Home \ Away	APU	AUN	ATM	ATT	BOL	COO	ACO	CAI	PAC	ÁNC
Alianza Unicachi		0–3	0–3	0–3	0–3	0–3		1–0	2–0	1–2
Alianza Universidad	3–1		2–3	5–0	1–0	4–2	3–1	0–0	2–2	2–0
Atlético Minero	1–2	1–1		2–0	2–1	2–0	3–0	2–2	0–2	3–1
Atlético Torino	1–1	1–0	1–0		2–1	0–1	4–0	0–1	1–2	1–6
Coronel Bolognesi	1–0	0–4	1–0	1–2		1–3	3–0	1–1	0–1	2–1
Deportivo Coopsol	1–0	1–0	2–0	2–0	4–0		3–0	1–1	0–0	3–2
Hijos de Acosvinchos	0–3	0–3	0–1	0–3	0–3	0–3		0–1	0–3	0–3
Los Caimanes	3–0	2–0	1–0	0–0	4–1	2–1	3–0		2–2	4–0
Pacífico	3–0	0–0	1–2	1–0	5–0	3–1	3–0	3–2		1–1
Sport Áncash	3–0	5–1	3–0	1–0	3–0	2–1	3–0	2–0	1–1	

Updated to match(es) played on pre-season. Source: RSSSF
Legend: Blue = home team win; Yellow = draw; Red = away team win.

== Top goalscorers ==
12 goals

- (Peru) Jesús Reyes (Alianza Universidad)

11 goals

- (Argentina) Fabricio Lenci (Sport Áncash)

10 goals

- (Peru) Janio Posito (Los Caimanes)

8 goals

- (Peru) Juan Montenegro (Pacifico)

7 goals

- (Peru) Alexander Salas (Minero)

== See also ==
- 2012 Torneo Descentralizado
- 2012 Copa Perú
