= 2009 Peruvian Segunda División =

Peruvian Segunda División
- Season: 2009
- Dates: 16 May – 18 October 2009
- Champions: Sport Boys
- Relegated: Deportivo Municipal; Real Academia
- Matches: 132
- Top goalscorer: Juan Luna (15)
- Biggest home win: Cobresol 6–0 Atlético Minero
- Biggest away win: Sport Águila 2–5 Atlético Minero
- Highest scoring: 7 goals: Sport Águila 2–5 Atlético Minero; Sport Águila 4–3 Atlético Torino; Hijos de Acosvinchos 3–4 Coopsol; Universidad San Marcos 4–3 Sport Águila

The 2009 Segunda División season was the 57th edition of the second tier of Federación Peruana de Futbol. There were 12 teams in play played. The champion, Sport Boys, was promoted to the 2010 Torneo Descentralizado. The last places, Real Academia and Deportivo Municipal, were relegated to 2010 Copa Perú. The tournament was played on a home-and-away round-robin basis.

== Teams ==
=== Team changes ===
Promoted from 2008 Copa Perú	Relegated from 2008 Primera División	Promoted to 2009 Primera División	Relegated to 2009 Copa Perú
▲ Atlético Torino (3rd) ▲ Cobresol (4th) ▲IDUNSA (5th)	▼ Atlético Minero (13th) ▼ Sport Boys (14th)	▲ Total Clean (1st)	▼UTC (10th)

=== Stadia and Locations ===
Locations of the Segunda División 2009 teams

Team	City	Stadium	Capacity	Field
América Cochahuayco	Ate, Lima	Monumental	80,093	Grass
Atlético Minero	Matucana	Municipal de Matucana	5,000	Grass
Atlético Torino	Talara	Campeonísimo	8,000	Grass
Cobresol	Moquegua	25 de Noviembre	3,000	Grass
Deportivo Coopsol	Chancay	Rómulo Shaw Cisneros	13,000	Grass
Deportivo Municipal	Lima	Miguel Grau	13,000	Grass
Hijos de Acosvinchos	Ate, Lima	San Marcos	43,000	Grass
IDUNSA	Arequipa	Mariano Melgar	20,000	Grass
Real Academia	Lima	Iván Elías Moreno	10,000	Grass
Sport Águila	Huancayo	Huancayo	20,000	Grass
Sport Boys	Callao	Miguel Grau	15,000	Grass
Universidad San Marcos	Lima	San Marcos	43,000	Grass

== League table ==
=== Standings ===
Pos	Team	Pld	W	D	L	GF	GA	GD	Pts	Promotion or relegation
1	Sport Boys (C)	22	12	7	3	39	27	+12	43	2010 Primera División
2	Cobresol	22	12	6	4	41	29	+12	42	
3	Deportivo Coopsol	22	11	5	6	32	26	+6	38	
4	IDUNSA	22	10	6	6	28	18	+10	36	
5	Sport Águila	22	9	6	7	44	39	+5	33	
6	Universidad San Marcos	22	8	4	10	32	38	−6	28	
7	América Cochahuayco	22	6	9	7	28	27	+1	27	
8	Hijos de Acosvinchos	22	6	6	10	36	41	−5	24	
9	Atlético Minero	22	6	6	10	25	31	−6	24	
10	Atlético Torino	22	5	7	10	23	32	−9	22	
11	Real Academia (R)	22	3	10	9	20	33	−13	19	2010 Copa Perú
12	Deportivo Municipal (R)	22	5	6	11	20	31	−11	17 (Note: Deportivo Municipal were docked 4 points for failing to pay two former players.)	2010 Copa Perú

Updated to match(es) played on October 17, 2009. Source:
Rules for classification: 1) points; 2) goal difference; 3) number of goals scored.
(C) Champions; (R) Relegated

== Results ==
Home \ Away	AME	ATM	ATT	COB	COO	DMU	ACO	IDU	RAC	SÁG	SBA	USM
América Cochahuayco		1–1	4–2	0–0	4–1	1–1	3–1	0–0	1–1	3–2	1–2	2–3
Atlético Minero	3–0		1–0	2–2	0–1	3–2	0–0	1–3	1–0	1–2	1–1	1–2
Atlético Torino	2–1	1–1		3–1	2–1	1–0	2–2	1–1	1–0	1–1	0–1	0–1
Cobresol	1–0	6–0	2–0		2–1	3–1	3–0	2–1	2–1	3–2	1–1	3–0
Deportivo Coopsol	1–0	1–0	1–1	1–1		2–0	3–2	1–0	1–1	2–0	1–0	2–3
Deportivo Municipal	0–0	1–0	1–0	1–1	1–3		3–2	3–1	0–0	0–0	0–2	3–1
Hijos de Acosvinchos	2–3	1–3	1–0	5–1	3–4	2–0		2–2	2–1	3–3	1–2	1–0
IDUNSA	0–1	2–0	3–0	0–1	1–0	1–0	0–0		1–0	0–0	2–1	4–1
Real Academia	3–3	0–0	1–1	2–2	1–1	2–1	1–1	1–3		2–1	0–4	2–1
Sport Águila	0–0	2–5	4–3	4–1	2–1	2–0	2–1	1–1	2–0		3–2	4–2
Sport Boys	1–0	2–1	2–2	3–2	1–1	3–1	3–0	1–0	1–1	4–2		1–1
Universidad San Marcos	0–0	1–0	2–0	0–1	1–2	2–2	2–4	1–2	3–0	4–3	1–1	

Updated to match(es) played on October 17, 2009. Source: RSSSF
Legend: Blue = home team win; Yellow = draw; Red = away team win.

== See also ==
- 2009 Torneo Descentralizado
- 2009 Copa Perú
