= 2007 Peruvian Segunda División =

Peruvian Segunda División
- Season: 2007
- Dates: 26 May – 11 November 2007
- Champions: Universidad César Vallejo
- Runner up: Atlético Minero
- Relegated: Alfonso Ugarte; Unión Huaral
- Matches: 110
- Goals: 278 (2.53 per match)
- Top goalscorer: Ricardo Caldas (13 goals)

The 2007 Peruvian Segunda División season was the 55th edition of the second tier of Federación Peruana de Futbol. There were 11 teams in play. Only 9 teams from the 2006 edition remained. Hijos de Acosvinchos, runner-up of the 2006 Copa Peru was promoted to the 2007 edition while Unión Huaral, which was relegated from the 2006 Peruvian first division, also participated in the tournament. The champion, Universidad César Vallejo, was promoted to the 2008 Torneo Descentralizado. The last place, Alfonso Ugarte of Puno, was relegated its respective regional league. The tournament was played on a home-and-away round-robin basis.

== Teams ==
=== Team changes ===
Promoted from 2006 Copa Perú	Relegated from 2006 Primera División	Promoted to 2007 Primera División	Relegated to 2007 Copa Perú
▲ Hijos de Acosvinchos (2nd)	▼ José Gálvez (11th) ▼ Unión Huaral (12th)	▲ Deportivo Municipal (1st)	▼ Deportivo Curibamba (11th) ▼ Defensor Villa del Mar (12th)

=== Stadia and Locations ===
Locations of the Segunda División 2007 teams

Team	City	Stadium	Capacity
Alfonso Ugarte	Puno	Enrique Torres Belón	20,000
América Cochahuayco	Lima	Monumental	80,093
Atlético Minero	Matucana	Municipal de Matucana	5,000
Aviación-Coopsol	Lima	Municipal de Chorrillos	15,000
Hijos de Acosvinchos	Lima	Universidad San Marcos	43,000
Loreto	Iquitos	Max Augustín	24,000
Real Ayacucho	Ayacucho	Ciudad de Cumaná	15,000
Unión Huaral	Huaral	Julio Lores Colan	10,000
Universidad César Vallejo	Trujillo	Mansiche	25,000
Universidad San Marcos	Lima	Universidad San Marcos	43,000
UTC	Cajamarca	Heroes de San Ramón	15,000

== League table ==
=== Standings ===
Pos	Team	Pld	W	D	L	GF	GA	GD	Pts	Promotion or relegation
1	Universidad César Vallejo (C)	20	14	3	3	41	12	+29	45	2008 Primera División
2	Atlético Minero (O)	20	12	7	1	39	10	+29	43	Advance to Promotion playoff
3	UTC	20	11	6	3	25	16	+9	39	
4	Aviación-Coopsol	20	10	4	6	27	20	+7	34	
5	Universidad San Marcos	20	8	6	6	29	22	+7	30	
6	América Cochahuayco	20	9	3	8	26	21	+5	30	
7	Loreto	20	6	6	8	28	27	+1	24	
8	Real Ayacucho	20	6	6	8	19	26	−7	24	
9	Hijos de Acosvinchos	20	5	4	11	15	26	−11	19	
10	Unión Huaral (R)	20	3	2	15	20	50	−30	11	2008 Copa Perú
11	Alfonso Ugarte (R)	20	2	1	17	9	48	−39	7	2008 Copa Perú

Updated to match(es) played on December 31, 2007. Source:
Rules for classification: 1) points; 2) goal difference; 3) number of goals scored.
(C) Champions; (O) Play-off winners; (R) Relegated

=== Results ===
Home \ Away	AU	AME	ATM	DAV	ACO	LOR	RAY	UHU	UCV	USM	UTC
Alfonso Ugarte		0–2	0–5	2–4	0–2	0–4	2–0	1–1	0–5	0–2	0–2
América Cochahuayco	2–0		0–4	0–1	1–0	0–0	0–1	4–1	1–2	0–1	0–0
Atlético Minero	4–1	3–1		1–0	2–0	3–1	2–2	4–0	1–1	3–0	1–0
Aviación-Coopsol	2–0	2–1	1–1		2–1	2–1	3–0	3–1	1–2	0–2	0–0
Hijos de Acosvinchos	2–0	1–3	0–0	1–3		2–2	1–0	2–0	0–2	0–0	0–0
Loreto	2–0	1–1	1–1	2–1	0–2		1–1	4–1	1–3	2–0	1–1
Real Ayacucho	2–0	0–2	0–1	2–0	2–1	1–0		0–2	1–1	1–1	2–3
Unión Huaral	1–2	1–4	0–2	0–0	3–0	3–4	0–1		0–1	0–5	1–2
Universidad César Vallejo	1–0	1–0	2–1	0–1	2–0	2–0	1–1	6–0		2–0	6–0
Universidad San Marcos	3–1	1–2	0–0	2–2	3–0	2–1	2–2	2–4	2–0		0–1
UTC	2–0	1–2	0–0	2–0	1–0	1–0	3–0	3–1	2–1	1–1	

Updated to match(es) played on December 31, 2007. Source: RSSSF
Legend: Blue = home team win; Yellow = draw; Red = away team win.

== Promotion playoff ==
13 January 2008

Atlético Minero	3–0	Sport Águila
Jorge Leiva 27'; Carlos Flores 59' (o.g.); Edwin Retamozo 90'

Estadio Monumental, Lima
Attendance: 25,000
Referee: Víctor Hugo Rivera

== See also ==
- 2007 Torneo Descentralizado
- 2007 Copa Perú
