= 2006 Peruvian Segunda División =

Peruvian Segunda División
- Season: 2006
- Dates: 13 May – 22 October 2006
- Champions: Deportivo Municipal
- Runner up: Universidad San Marcos
- Relegated: Defensor Villa del Mar; Deportivo Curibamba
- Matches: 132
- Goals: 319 (2.42 per match)
- Top goalscorer: Wilkin Cavero (16 goals)

The 2006 Peruvian Segunda División (Peruvian Second Division) season was the 54th edition of the second tier of Association football governed by the Federación Peruana de Futbol. For the first time ever, the Peruvian second tier became a nationwide league, 40 years after the first tier had expanded to the entire nation. There were 12 teams in play on a home-and-away round-robin cycle. Deportivo Municipal, won the tournament and was promoted to the 2007 Torneo Descentralizado. Deportivo Curibamba and Defensor Villa del Mar were in last places of the tournament and were relegated to the 2007 Copa Perú.

== Teams ==
=== Team changes ===
Promoted from 2005 Copa Perú	Relegated from 2005 Primera División	Relegated to 2006 Copa Perú
▲ Atlético Minero (Invited) ▲UTC (Invited)	▼ Universidad César Vallejo (12th) ▼ Atlético Universidad (13th)	▼AELU (9th) ▼ Virgen de Chapi (10th) ▼ Unión de Campeones (11th) ▼ Somos Aduanas (12th)

=== Stadia and Locations ===
Locations of the Segunda División 2006 teams

Team	City	Stadium	Capacity
Alfonso Ugarte	Puno	Enrique Torres Belón	20,000
América Cochahuayco	Lima	Monumental	80,093
Atlético Minero	Matucana	Municipal de Matucana	5,000
Aviación-Coopsol	Lima	Municipal de Chorrillos	15,000
Deportivo Curibamba	Andahuaylas	Los Chankas	10,000
Deportivo Municipal	Lima	Municipal de Chorrillos	15,000
Defensor Villa del Mar	Lima	Iván Elías Moreno	10,000
La Peña Sporting	Lima	Iván Elías Moreno	10,000
Olímpico Aurora Miraflores	Lima	Manuel Bonilla	5,000
Universidad César Vallejo	Trujillo	Mansiche	25,000
Universidad San Marcos	Lima	Universidad San Marcos	43,000
UTC	Cajamarca	Heroes de San Ramón	15,000

== League table ==
=== Standings ===
Pos	Team	Pld	W	D	L	GF	GA	GD	Pts	Promotion or relegation
1	Deportivo Municipal (C)	22	12	9	1	35	15	+20	45	2007 Primera División
2	Universidad San Marcos	22	11	8	3	27	11	+16	41	
3	Aviación-Coopsol	22	10	7	5	29	19	+10	37	
4	UTC	22	10	6	6	29	26	+3	36	
5	Atlético Minero	22	10	5	7	37	28	+9	35	
6	Alfonso Ugarte	22	9	5	8	32	35	−3	32	
7	América Cochahuayco	22	7	7	8	27	27	0	28	
8	Olímpico Aurora Miraflores	22	6	10	6	18	19	−1	28	
9	Universidad César Vallejo	22	7	5	10	29	32	−3	26	
10	La Peña Sporting	22	5	5	12	29	36	−7	20	
11	Deportivo Curibamba (R)	22	5	4	13	19	33	−14	19	2007 Copa Perú
12	Defensor Villa del Mar (R)	22	3	3	16	8	38	−30	12	2007 Copa Perú

Updated to match(es) played on October 22, 2006. Source:
Rules for classification: 1) points; 2) goal difference; 3) number of goals scored.
(C) Champions; (R) Relegated

== Results ==
Home \ Away	AU	AME	ATM	DAV	DVM	DCU	DMU	LPS	OAM	UCV	USM	UTC
Alfonso Ugarte		1–0	2–1	4–2	3–0	2–0	2–1	0–2	0–0	1–0	1–1	3–0
América Cochahuayco	1–4		2–2	0–2	2–0	1–0	0–1	1–3	1–1	3–0	1–1	2–2
Atlético Minero	3–2	3–3		1–3	0–0	3–0	0–1	1–1	3–0	4–0	1–2	0–2
Aviación-Coopsol	1–1	0–2	0–2		1–0	1–0	1–2	2–2	0–1	3–0	0–0	2–0
Defensor Villa del Mar	1–0	2–3	1–1	0–2		0–2	0–2	1–0	2–1	0–4	1–2	0–2
Deportivo Curibamba	4–1	0–0	0–2	0–3	1–0		2–2	2–0	0–0	2–1	0–0	1–2
Deportivo Municipal	3–1	1–0	2–0	1–1	5–0	3–1		2–0	1–1	1–1	1–0	3–2
La Peña Sporting	6–0	0–2	3–4	0–1	1–0	4–3	1–1		1–1	0–1	0–1	1–3
Olímpico Aurora Miraflores	1–1	1–0	1–2	1–1	2–0	1–0	1–1	0–0		1–1	0–1	2–0
Universidad César Vallejo	4–2	1–1	3–2	1–2	0–0	2–1	0–0	5–1	1–2		0–2	4–2
Universidad San Marcos	3–0	1–2	0–1	0–0	2–0	4–0	0–0	2–1	2–0	1–0		1–1
UTC	1–1	1–0	0–1	1–1	2–0	1–0	1–1	3–2	1–0	1–0	1–1	

Updated to match(es) played on October 22, 2006. Source: RSSSF
Legend: Blue = home team win; Yellow = draw; Red = away team win.

== See also ==
- 2006 Torneo Descentralizado
- 2006 Copa Perú
