= 2008 Peruvian Segunda División =

Peruvian Segunda División
- Season: 2008
- Dates: 24 May – 6 December 2008
- Champions: Total Clean
- Relegated: UTC
- Top goalscorer: Jorge Lozada (12)

The 2008 season of the Peruvian Segunda División season was the 56th edition of the second tier of Federación Peruana de Futbol. There were 10 teams in play. Only 7 teams from last season remain. Sport Águila, from the 2007 Copa Perú, was promoted to this season's edition, and Total Clean and Deportivo Municipal were relegated from the first division. Unión Huaral was not relegated last season but they dropped out and participated in the Copa Perú. Each team will play 27 games. The teams will first play home-and-away games. The teams will then play each other for a third time. The team that will play at home is going to be determined by the results of the first two games: the one with the better aggregate will play at home. The winner and runner-up of this season will be promoted to the 2009 Torneo Descentralizado. The team that finishes last will be relegated to the 2009 Copa Perú. The promoted teams will be replaced by the third and fourth place teams of the Copa Perú.

== Teams ==
=== Team changes ===
Promoted from 2007 Copa Perú	Relegated from 2007 Primera División	Promoted to 2008 Primera División	Relegated to 2008 Copa Perú
▲ Sport Águila (2nd)	▼ Deportivo Municipal (11th) ▼ Total Clean (12th)	▲ Universidad César Vallejo (1st)	▼ Unión Huaral (10th) ▼ Alfonso Ugarte (11th)

=== Stadia and Locations ===
Locations of the Segunda División 2008 teams

Team	City	Stadium	Capacity
América Cochahuayco	Lima	Monumental	80,093
Aviación-Coopsol	Lima	Municipal de Chorrillos	15,000
Deportivo Municipal	Lima	Universidad San Marcos	43,000
Hijos de Acosvinchos	Lima	Universidad San Marcos	43,000
Inti Gas	Ica	José Picasso Peratta	5,000
Real Ayacucho	Ayacucho	Ciudad de Cumaná	15,000
Sport Águila	Huancayo	Huancayo	20,000
Total Clean	Arequipa	Mariano Melgar	20,000
Universidad San Marcos	Lima	Universidad San Marcos	43,000
UTC	Cajamarca	Heroes de San Ramón	15,000

== League table ==
=== Standings ===
Pos	Team	Pld	W	D	L	GF	GA	GD	Pts	Promotion or relegation
1	Total Clean (C)	27	15	7	5	43	22	+21	52	2009 Primera División
2	Inti Gas	27	14	8	5	36	20	+16	50	2009 Primera División
3	Sport Águila	27	13	7	7	43	31	+12	46	
4	Hijos de Acosvinchos	27	11	7	9	31	29	+2	40	
5	Universidad San Marcos	27	12	4	11	27	32	−5	40	
6	Aviación-Coopsol	27	10	9	8	31	23	+8	39	
7	Deportivo Municipal	27	9	7	11	28	36	−8	34	
8	Real Ayacucho	27	6	8	13	23	39	−16	26	
9	América Cochahuayco	27	6	5	16	32	43	−11	23	
10	UTC (R)	27	4	8	15	18	37	−19	20	2009 Copa Perú

Updated to match(es) played on December 11, 2008. Source:
Rules for classification: 1) points; 2) goal difference; 3) number of goals scored.
(C) Champions; (R) Relegated

== Results ==
=== First and second rounds ===
Home \ Away	AME	DAV	DMU	ACO	IGD	RAY	SÁG	TCL	USM	UTC
América Cochahuayco		1–2	1–2	1–0	1–1	5–2	3–1	1–1	1–2	0–0
Aviación-Coopsol	2–1		3–0	0–0	0–0	3–0	1–1	1–1	3–0	3–0
Deportivo Municipal	1–0	0–0		1–0	1–0	0–2	0–1	1–0	1–0	2–1
Hijos de Acosvinchos	2–1	2–0	1–0		1–1	1–0	0–0	1–0	3–2	2–0
Inti Gas	1–0	1–1	1–0	2–1		2–0	4–3	2–2	0–0	2–0
Real Ayacucho	1–0	0–1	1–1	1–3	1–0		1–1	1–1	2–1	1–0
Sport Águila	3–1	2–1	0–0	1–0	0–4	1–0		1–1	4–0	2–1
Total Clean	4–1	2–1	3–2	1–1	1–0	2–0	1–2		1–0	2–0
Universidad San Marcos	1–2	1–0	0–0	1–0	2–1	2–1	2–1	1–0		1–0
UTC	1–0	0–0	3–1	1–0	0–1	1–1	1–1	1–2	1–2	

Updated to match(es) played on October 17, 2009. Source: RSSSF
Legend: Blue = home team win; Yellow = draw; Red = away team win.

=== Third round ===
Home \ Away	AME	DAV	DMU	ACO	IGD	RAY	SÁG	TCL	USM	UTC
América Cochahuayco										
Aviación-Coopsol	2–1		2–0			1–1			1–2	1–0
Deportivo Municipal	1–3								3–2	
Hijos de Acosvinchos	1–5	1–1	1–4			2–0		1–1	2–0	2–2
Inti Gas	1–0	1–0	2–2	3–2		2–0	1–0			2–0
Real Ayacucho	1–1		2–2							1–1
Sport Águila	2–2	3–0	4–2	0–1		3–0		2–1	0–2	4–1
Total Clean	4–0	2–1	2–0		2–1	1–0			2–0	3–0
Universidad San Marcos	2–0				0–0	1–3				0–0
UTC	2–0		1–1							

Updated to match(es) played on October 17, 2009. Source: RSSSF
Legend: Blue = home team win; Yellow = draw; Red = away team win.

== See also ==
- 2008 Torneo Descentralizado
- 2008 Copa Perú
