= 2011 Peruvian Segunda División =

Peruvian Segunda División
- Season: 2011
- Dates: 7 May – 11 December 2011
- Champions: José Gálvez
- Relegated: U América
- Matches: 130
- Goals: 373 (2.87 per match)
- Top goalscorer: Wellington Adão (19 goals)
- Biggest home win: Alianza Unicachi 6 - 1 Universidad San Marcos; Sport Ancash 5 - 0 Universidad San Marcos; Sport Ancash 5 - 0 Alianza Unicachi
- Biggest away win: Universidad San Marcos 1 - 5 U América; Universidad San Marcos 1 - 5 Coronel Bolognesi
- Highest scoring: Universidad San Marcos 6 - 2 Hijos de Acosvinchos

The 2011 Segunda División season was the 59th edition of the second tier of Federación Peruana de Futbol. The tournament was played on a home-and-away round-robin basis.

The season was divided into 2 stages. In the first stage the 10 teams played a round-robin home-and-away round for a total of 18 matches each. In the second stage the 10 teams were divided into 2 groups. The top 5 teams played in the group Liguilla Ascenso and the bottom 5 teams played in Liguilla Descenso. Each team carried on their records from the first stage.

On April 5, 2011, Total Chalaco withdrew before the start of the season.

== Teams ==
=== Team changes ===
| Promoted from 2010 Copa Perú | Relegated from 2010 Primera División | Promoted to 2011 Primera División | Relegated to 2011 Copa Perú | Retired |
|---|---|---|---|---|
| ▲ Alianza Unicachi (2nd) | ▼ José Gálvez (15th) ▼ Total Chalaco (16th) | ▲ Cobresol (1st) | ▼ Tecnológico (10th) | ▼ Total Chalaco (Retired) |

=== Stadia and Locations ===
Locations of the Segunda División 2011 teams

| Team | City | Stadium | Capacity | Field |
|---|---|---|---|---|
| Alianza Unicachi | Puno | Enrique Torres Belón | 20,000 | Grass |
| Atlético Minero | Matucana | Municipal de Matucana | 5,000 | Grass |
| Atlético Torino | Talara | Campeonísimo | 8,000 | Grass |
| Coronel Bolognesi | Tacna | Jorge Basadre | 19,850 | Grass |
| Deportivo Coopsol | Chancay | Rómulo Shaw Cisneros | 13,000 | Grass |
| Hijos de Acosvinchos | Lima | Colegio San Alfonso | 2,000 | Grass |
| José Gálvez | Chimbote | Manuel Rivera Sánchez | 25,000 | Artificial |
| Sport Áncash | Huaraz | Rosas Pampa | 18,000 | Grass |
| U América | Lima | Monumental | 80,093 | Grass |
| Universidad San Marcos | Lima | San Marcos | 43,000 | Grass |

== First stage ==
=== Standings ===
| Pos | Team | Pld | W | D | L | GF | GA | GD | Pts | Qualification or relegation |
|---|---|---|---|---|---|---|---|---|---|---|
| 1 | José Gálvez | 18 | 15 | 1 | 2 | 38 | 11 | +27 | 46 (Note: Jose Galvez defeated Atletico Torino by walkover, because Torino failed to pay to ADFP-SD.) | Liguilla Ascenso |
| 2 | Sport Áncash | 18 | 15 | 1 | 2 | 40 | 12 | +28 | 42 (Note: Sport Áncash were deducted 4 points.) | Liguilla Ascenso |
| 3 | Deportivo Coopsol | 18 | 11 | 1 | 6 | 26 | 19 | +7 | 34 | Liguilla Ascenso |
| 4 | Alianza Unicachi | 18 | 9 | 2 | 7 | 29 | 19 | +10 | 29 | Liguilla Ascenso |
| 5 | Atlético Minero | 18 | 7 | 3 | 8 | 28 | 25 | +3 | 24 | Liguilla Ascenso |
| 6 | Hijos de Acosvinchos | 18 | 7 | 1 | 10 | 23 | 30 | −7 | 22 (Note: Atletico Torino and Hijos de Acosvinchos were declared losers by walkover, obtaining a scoreboard against 0-3.) | Liguilla Descenso |
| 7 | Universidad San Marcos | 18 | 6 | 2 | 10 | 29 | 40 | −11 | 20 | Liguilla Descenso |
| 8 | Atlético Torino | 18 | 4 | 1 | 13 | 8 | 36 | −28 | 13 | Liguilla Descenso |
| 9 | U América | 18 | 3 | 3 | 12 | 15 | 27 | −12 | 12 | Liguilla Descenso |
| 10 | Coronel Bolognesi | 18 | 3 | 3 | 12 | 21 | 44 | −23 | 12 | Liguilla Descenso |

Updated to match(es) played on 2 October 2011. Source: adfp-sd.com
Rules for classification: 1) points; 2) goal difference; 3) number of goals scored.

=== Results ===
| Home \ Away | APU | ATM | ATT | BOL | COO | ACO | JG | ÁNC | AME | USM |
|---|---|---|---|---|---|---|---|---|---|---|
| Alianza Unicachi | | 0–1 | 3–0 | 4–0 | 1–0 | 2–0 | 0–3 | 2–4 | 0–3 | 6–1 |
| Atlético Minero | 1–2 | | 2–1 | 4–0 | 2–0 | 1–2 | 1–1 | 0–1 | 1–2 | 1–2 |
| Atlético Torino | 0–3 | 0–3 | | 1–0 | 0–3 | W.O. (Note: Atletico Torino and Hijos de Acosvinchos were both declared losers by walkover, obtaining a scoreboard against 0-3.) | 2–1 | 0–3 | 1–0 | 1–0 |
| Coronel Bolognesi | 0–3 | 2–2 | 2–1 | | 1–1 | 2–3 | 0–3 | 1–3 | 3–2 | 3–3 |
| Deportivo Coopsol | 1–0 | 3–1 | 1–0 | 2–0 | | 2–1 | 2–3 | 1–2 | 2–1 | 3–2 |
| Hijos de Acosvinchos | 1–0 | 2–1 | 3–0 | 2–1 | 0–1 | | 2–3 | 1–2 | 2–0 | 1–3 |
| José Gálvez | 2–0 | 2–0 | 3–0 (Note: Jose Galvez defeated Atletico Torino by walkover, because Torino failed to pay to ADFP-SD.) | 3–0 | 3–0 | 1–0 | | 1–0 | 1–0 | 2–0 |
| Sport Áncash | 1–1 | 1–2 | 2–0 | 4–0 | 3–1 | 1–0 | 2–1 | | 3–0 | 5–0 |
| U América | 1–1 | 2–3 | 1–1 | 2–1 | 0–3 | 1–1 | 0–1 | 0–1 | | 0–1 |
| Universidad San Marcos | 0–1 | 2–2 | 3–0 | 1–5 | 0–1 | 6–2 | 2–4 | 2–3 | 1–0 | |

Updated to match(es) played on pre-season. Source: RSSSF
Legend: Blue = home team win; Yellow = draw; Red = away team win.

== Liguilla Ascenso ==
=== Standings ===
| Pos | Team | Pld | W | D | L | GF | GA | GD | Pts | Promotion | JG | COO | APU | ÁNC | ATM |
|---|---|---|---|---|---|---|---|---|---|---|---|---|---|---|---|
| 1 | José Gálvez (C) | 26 | 21 | 3 | 2 | 61 | 20 | +41 | 66 | 2012 Primera División | | 1–1 | 3–1 | 3–0 | 6–2 |
| 2 | Deportivo Coopsol | 26 | 14 | 5 | 7 | 43 | 27 | +16 | 47 | | 2–2 | | 1–1 | 3–0 | 4–1 |
| 3 | Alianza Unicachi | 26 | 13 | 3 | 10 | 40 | 32 | +8 | 42 | | 1–3 | 2–1 | | 3–0 | 1–0 |
| 4 | Sport Áncash | 26 | 17 | 2 | 7 | 50 | 27 | +23 | 37 (Note: Sport Áncash were deducted 12 points by reach not the minimum of minutes required for U-20 players.) | | 0–2 | 1–1 | 5–0 | | 0–3 |
| 5 | Atlético Minero | 26 | 8 | 3 | 15 | 35 | 49 | −14 | 27 | | 1–3 | 0–4 | 0–2 | 0–4 | |

Updated to match(es) played on pre-season. Source: RSSSF
Legend: Blue = home team win; Yellow = draw; Red = away team win.
Rules for classification: 1) points; 2) goal difference; 3) number of goals scored.
(C) Champions

== Liguilla Descenso ==
=== Standings ===
| Pos | Team | Pld | W | D | L | GF | GA | GD | Pts | Relegation | ATT | ACO | USM | AME | BOL |
|---|---|---|---|---|---|---|---|---|---|---|---|---|---|---|---|
| 1 | Atlético Torino | 26 | 9 | 3 | 14 | 19 | 40 | −21 | 29 (Note: Atlético Torino were deducted 1 point for failing to pay former player Yetro García.) | | | 1–1 | 3–1 | 1–0 | 1–0 |
| 2 | Hijos de Acosvinchos | 26 | 8 | 3 | 15 | 29 | 46 | −17 | 27 | | 0–3 | | 0–3 | 2–0 | 0–1 |
| 3 | Universidad San Marcos | 26 | 7 | 6 | 13 | 39 | 56 | −17 | 27 | | 1–1 | 2–2 | | 1–5 | 2–2 |
| 4 | U América (R) | 26 | 6 | 6 | 14 | 29 | 36 | −7 | 24 | Relegation play-off | 1–0 | 3–0 | 0–0 | | 3–3 |
| 5 | Coronel Bolognesi (O) | 26 | 6 | 6 | 14 | 35 | 54 | −19 | 24 | Relegation play-off | 0–1 | 3–1 | 3–0 | 2–2 | |

Updated to match(es) played on pre-season. Source: RSSSF
Legend: Blue = home team win; Yellow = draw; Red = away team win.
Rules for classification: 1) points; 2) goal difference; 3) number of goals scored.
(O) Play-off winners; (R) Relegated

== Relegation play-off ==
21 December 2011
14:00

| U América | 1–4 | Coronel Bolognesi |
|---|---|---|
| Christian Cuadros 45+1' | | Wellington Adão 1' 115' 116' 119' |

Estadio Rómulo Shaw Cisneros, Chancay
Referee: George Buckley

== Top goalscorers ==
19 goals

- (Brazil) Wellington Adão (Coronel Bolognesi)

14 goals

- (Argentina) Fabricio Lenci (Sport Áncash)

8 goals

- (Peru) Juan Carrillo (Sport Áncash)
- (Peru) Gustavo Vassallo (Universidad San Marcos)
- (Peru) Pedro Sanguinetti (Alianza Unicachi)

6 goals

- (Peru) César Goya (Hijos de Acosvinchos)
- (Peru) Wilkin Cavero (U América)

== See also ==
- 2011 Torneo Descentralizado
- 2011 Copa Perú
