= Freddy García (football manager) =

Peruvian football manager (born 1959)

Personal information
- Full name: Freddy Manuel García Loayza
- Date of birth: 22 November 1959 (age 67)
- Place of birth: Tacna, Peru

Managerial career
- Years: Team
- 1998–2001: Deportivo Bolito
- 2002–2006: Coronel Bolognesi (assistant)
- 2007: Coronel Bolognesi
- 2008: Diablos Rojos
- 2008: Total Clean
- 2009: Deportivo Coopsol
- 2010: Cobresol FBC
- 2011–2014: Real Garcilaso
- 2015: Ayacucho FC
- 2015: León de Huánuco
- 2016: Comerciantes Unidos
- 2017: Cienciano
- 2017: Binacional
- 2018: Alfonso Ugarte

Freddy Manuel "Petroleo" García Loayza (born 22 November 1959) is a Peruvian football manager who most recently was the manager of Alfonso Ugarte in the Copa Perú.

== Managerial career ==
García began his career as a manager in 1998 when he took charge of his home town club Deportivo Bolito. He quickly took them to 1st Division of Tacna. Then in 2001 he took Bolito into the later stages of the Copa Perú, but was later replaced by Ítalo Herrera, who then went on to win the 2001 Copa Perú. Now promoted to the top-flight, the club Sport Bolito changed its name to Coronel Bolognesi FC, and García was appointed assistant manager to Roberto Di Plácido. García would then be act as interim and assistant manager of the Tacna club from 2002 to 2006 and served as an assistant to up-and-coming managers like Roberto Mosquera and Jorge Sampaoli. Finally in the 2007 Torneo Descentralizado season he would have his chance as the head manager of Bolognesi in the Clausura.

Then in 2008 he managed Diablos Rojos de Juliaca and later Total Clean of the Peruvian Segunda División. García quickly found success with Total Clean by guiding them to promotion to the top-flight as the club finished as champions of the 2008 season.

In January 2009 García took charge of Peruvian Segunda División club Deportivo Coopsol. He managed them in 2009 season but this time could not guide them to the Descentralizado.

Then he was hired as the new manager of Cobresol FBC in January 2010. He quickly found success again as he took the Moquegua club to top-flight for the first time as the club won the 2010 season. With the club in the Torneo Descentralizado, Petroleo did not continue as the manager of Cobresol.

García was then appointed manager of ambitious Cusco club Real Garcilaso in January 2011. Once again for the third time in his career he managed the newly formed club to the top-flight this time by finishing as champions of the 2011 Copa Perú. Under his managership he has taken Real Garcilaso to back to back national finals in 2012 and 2013 as well as the 2013 Copa Libertadores quarter-finals.

== Honours ==
=== Managerial ===
Total Clean

- Peruvian Segunda División: 2008

Cobresol FBC

- Peruvian Segunda División: 2010

Real Garcilaso

- Copa Perú: 2011
- Torneo Descentralizado runner-up: 2012, 2013
