= Tito Chumpitaz =

Peruvian footballer and manager (born 1967)

Personal information
- Full name: Héctor Eleazar Chumpitaz Dulanto
- Date of birth: 15 December 1967 (age 58)
- Place of birth: Lima, Peru
- Position: Right-back

Team information
- Current team: Pacífico FC (head coach)

Senior career*
Years	Team	Apps	(Gls)
- CNI
- Deportivo AELU
- Hijos de Yurimaguas

Managerial career
- ?–1998: Hijos de Yurimaguas
- 1999: Deportivo Pesquero
- 2002: Peru U-15
- 2003: Virgen de Chapi FC
- 2004: Sport Áncash
- 2005: Sport Áncash
- 2005–2006: Sport Áncash
- 2006: Unión Huaral
- 2006: Hijos de Acosvinchos
- 2007: Atlético Minero
- 2008: América Cochahuayco
- 2008–2009: Peru U-20
- 2009: Real Academia
- 2010: Franciscano San Román
- 2010: Sport Áncash
- 2010–2011: UTC
- 2011: Franciscano San Román
- 2012–2013: Deportivo Municipal
- 2014: Huracán de Canta
- 2014–2015: Juventud América
- 2015: Sport Áncash
- 2016: Walter Ormeño
- 2018: Cultural Santa Rosa
- 2019: Walter Ormeño
- 2020: AFE Cosmos Internacional
- 2021: Cultural Volante
- 2022: Walter Ormeño
- 2023: Huracán de Canta
- 2024: Walter Ormeño
- 2025–: Pacífico FC
- * Club domestic league appearances and goals

Héctor Eleazar Chumpitaz Dulanto (born 15 December 1967), better known as Tito Chumpitaz, is a Peruvian football manager and former player.

He is the eldest son of Héctor Chumpitaz, captain of the Peruvian team in the 1970s and an icon of Peruvian football.

== Biography ==
Compared to his father's, Tito Chumpitaz's football career never reached the heights of his father's. He played as a right winger, notably for CNI.

It was as a coach that he made a name for himself in Peru, managing numerous teams in the second division and the Copa Perú. He won the second division championship with Hijos de Yurimaguas in 1998 and finished second in 2007 with Atlético Minero.

Winner of the Copa Perú in 2004 with Sport Áncash, he became one of the club's regular coaches in the 2000s and 2010s. He also reached the Copa Perú final in 2006 with Hijos de Acosvinchos.

Between 2008 and 2009, he took charge of the Peruvian U20 team with high expectations due to the quality of the squad (Luis Advíncula, Carlos Zambrano, Reimond Manco, among others). However, Peru was eliminated in the first round of the South American U20 Championship in Venezuela.

== Honours ==
=== Manager ===
Hijos de Yurimaguas

- Peruvian Segunda División: 1998

Sport Áncash

- Copa Perú: 2004
