= Jesús Oropesa =

Peruvian football manager

Personal information
- Full name: Jesús Oropesa Chivilches
- Date of birth: 31 March 1970 (age 56)
- Place of birth: Camaná, Peru

Managerial career
- Years: Team
- América Cochahuayco
- Deportivo Coopsol
- 2008: Atlético Minero
- 2008–2009: Peru U20 (assistant)
- 2011: Hijos de Acosvinchos
- 2011–2012: Franciscano San Román
- 2012: Sport Áncash
- 2012: Willy Serrato
- 2013: Binacional
- 2013: Sportivo Huracán
- 2014: Willy Serrato
- 2015: Binacional
- 2015: San Antonio de Piura
- 2016: Willy Serrato
- 2018: Alfredo Salinas
- 2018: FC Retamoso
- 2019: Atlético Grau (assistant)
- 2020: Alianza Atlético (assistant)
- 2021: Sport Chavelines
- 2021: Atlético Grau
- 2022–2023: Unión Comercio
- 2023–2024: Juan Aurich
- 2024: Unión Comercio
- 2025: Unión Comercio
- 2025–2026: Estudiantil CNI
- 2026: Juan Aurich

Jesús Oropesa Chivilches (born 31 March 1970) is a Peruvian football manager.

== Career ==
Born in Camaná, Oropesa worked at Universidad San Martín, América Cochahuayco, Atlético Minero (where he led the club to the Segunda División in 2008 after finishing in the semifinals of the Copa Perú), Deportivo Coopsol, and the Peru national under-20 team as an assistant. He was in charge of Hijos de Acosvinchos during the 2011 season, and later was appointed in charge of Franciscano San Román.

In February 2012, Oropesa was named Sport Áncash manager. He later took over Willy Serrato in September of that year, and was in charge of Binacional during the 2013 season before being appointed at the helm of Sportivo Huracán on 26 July 2013.

In March 2014, Oropesa returned to Willy Serrato, and worked at Binacional, San Antonio de Piura and Willy Serrato again before being appointed manager of Alfredo Salinas in February 2018. In September, he was in charge of Edwin Retamoso's club FC Retamoso, being later an assistant of Wilmar Valencia at Atlético Grau in 2019.

In 2020, Oropesa was Jahir Butrón's assistant at Alianza Atlético, before being returning to a managerial role on 11 January 2021, with Sport Chavelines. He resigned on 17 July with the club in the first position, and returned to Atlético Grau late in the month, now as manager.

On 4 November 2021, despite achieving promotion to the Liga 1 as champions, Oropesa left Atlético Grau after failing to agree new terms. He was named Unión Comercio manager on 18 December, and also led the side to a promotion to the top tier; on 22 November 2021, he renewed his contract.

On 4 April 2023, Oropesa was sacked from Unión Comercio. He spent nearly a year in charge of Juan Aurich before returning to his previous club on 3 June 2024, but left due to health issues on 9 August.

== Honours ==
Atlético Grau

- Liga 2 (Peru): 2021
