= Moisés Cabada =

Peruvian footballer (born 1985)

Personal information
- Full name: Moisés Cabada Apreciado
- Date of birth: 2 November 1985 (age 41)
- Place of birth: Lima, Peru
- Height: 1.82 m (6 ft 0 in)
- Position: Centre-back

Team information
- Current team: Carlos Stein (reserves coach)

Senior career*
Years	Team	Apps	(Gls)
2004–2006	Sport Boys	10	(0)
2007	Univ. San Marcos	?	(?)
2008	Sport Boys	42	(1)
2009	Cienciano	15	(0)
2010–2011	José Gálvez	49	(4)
2012	UTC Cajamarca		
2012	Sport Boys	5	(0)
2013–2019	Los Caimanes	132	(2)

Managerial career
- 2019–: Carlos Stein (reserves coach)
- * Club domestic league appearances and goals

Moisés Cabada Apreciado (born 2 November 1985) is a Peruvian former professional footballer who played as a centre-back. He is head coach of FC Carlos Stein's reserve team.

== Playing career ==
Moisés Cabada started his senior career with Sport Boys, making his Torneo Descentralizado debut in the 2004 season. Then he played for CD Universidad San Marcos in the 2007 Segunda División season.

Cabada returned to the top-flight joining his former club Boys, where he participated in 42 matches and scored one goal in the 2008 Descentralizado season.

Then he had a short spell with Cienciano in 2009.

== Coaching career ==
In November 2019, Cabada began his coaching career, starting with a job as the head coach of FC Carlos Stein's reserve team.

== Honours ==
José Gálvez

- Torneo Intermedio: 2011
- Segunda División: 2011
