= Juan Luna (footballer) =

Peruvian footballer (born 1977)

Juan Luna Custodio
Personal information
- Full name: Juan Moisés Luna Custodio
- Date of birth: 8 May 1977 (age 49)
- Place of birth: Nazca, Peru
- Height: 1.87 m (6 ft 2 in)
- Position: Forward

Team information
- Current team: Sport Áncash

Senior career*
Years	Team	Apps	(Gls)
1994–1997	Am. Cochahuayco		
1997–1999	Lawn Tennis		
2000	Alianza Lima		
2000	Juan Aurich		
2001	Alfonso Ugarte		
2002–2003	La Peña Sporting		
2004–2005	Olímpico Somos Perú		
2006	Deportivo Aviación		
2007	Acosvinchos		
2008	CNI		
2009–2010	Acosvinchos	32	(28)
2011	José Gálvez	12	(7)
2012–	Sport Áncash	13	(2)
- * Club domestic league appearances and goals as of 23 September 2012

Juan Moisés Luna Custodio (born 8 May 1977) is a Peruvian footballer who plays primarily as a forward. He currently plays for Sport Áncash.

== Club career ==
He started his career with playing in the youth divisions of Universitario de Deportes. Then he began his senior career with América Cochahuayco in the Segunda División Peruana.

He joined Second Division side Lawn Tennis F.C. for the 1997 season and helped them win promotion for the following season by finishing first. Playing for Lawn Tennis FC, Luna made his debut in the Torneo Descentralizado in the 1998 season.

Luna had a short spell with Alianza Lima for the start of the 2000 Descentralizado season. Later that same season he played for Juan Aurich.

== Honours ==
=== Club ===
José Gálvez

- Torneo Intermedio: 2011
- Segunda División: 2011
