= 2007 Torneo Descentralizado =

Torneo Descentralizado
- Season: 2007
- Dates: 2 February 2007 – 16 December 2007
- Champions: Universidad San Martín; 1st Primera División title
- Runner up: Coronel Bolognesi
- Relegated: Deportivo Municipal; Total Clean
- Copa Libertadores: Universidad San Martín; Coronel Bolognesi; Cienciano
- Copa Sudamericana: Sport Áncash; Universitario
- Goals: 653
- Average goals/game: 2.47
- Top goalscorer: Johan Fano (19 goals)
- Biggest home win: Alianza Lima 6-0 Deportivo Municipal (2007-12-16)
- Biggest away win: Alianza Lima 0-5 Universidad San Martín (2007-08-12)
- Highest scoring: Sport Boys 4–4 Melgar (2007-04-29)

The 2007 Torneo Descentralizado (known as the Copa Cable Mágico for sponsorship reasons) is the ninety-first season of Peruvian football. A total of 12 teams competed in the tournament, with Alianza Lima as the defending champion. Universidad San Martín won its first national title as it did not have to play in the season finals due to Coronel Bolognesi's poor performance in the Torneo Apertura. The season began on February 3, 2007, and ended on December 16, 2007.

== Changes from 2006 ==
=== Rule changes ===
Starting with the 2007 season, promotion of the Segunda División champion was re-introduced.

=== Team changes ===
Promoted from 2006 Segunda División	Promoted from 2006 Copa Perú	Relegated from 2006 Primera División
▲ Deportivo Municipal (1st)	▲ Total Clean (1st)	▼ José Gálvez (11th) ▼ Unión Huaral (12th)

== Season overview ==
Universidad San Martín de Porres won the Apertura, their first title, and qualified for their first Copa Libertadores. Coronel Bolognesi won the Clausura which was their first title too. In the Apertura they had placed last and were in danger of relegation. No national championship final was contested because Coronel Bolognesi did not finish in the top 6 of the Apertura. The national title went to Universidad San Martín, who had accumulated more points on the aggregate table. Coincidentally, both teams also participated in the Copa Sudamericana together in 2006. The final fixture of the Clausura had four potential winners. Aside from Bolognesi, Universitario de Deportes, Alianza Lima, Cienciano, and Sport Áncash had a chance at winning the title. They all won their last fixtures, however, Bolognesi also won its fixture and surpassed Universitario by one point. Despite not winning the Clausura, Cienciano qualified for the Copa Libertadores 2008 preliminary round, and Universitario and Sport Áncash qualified for the Copa Sudamericana 2008. Alianza Lima, however, finished the season empty-handed.

Sporting Cristal, a Peruvian giant, was in danger of relegation throughout the season. This was Cristal's worst season in its history. The team failed in the Apertura under the Argentine Sampaoli and the club decided to hire Juan Carlos Oblitas for the Clausura. At first he did not have much success but during the second half of the Clausura, they were undefeated for the remaining 11 games with 5 wins and 6 draws. Cristal finished tying the last fixture and remained in the First Division. The newly promoted Deportivo Municipal and Total Clean were relegated. Deportivo Municipal played its last fixture with its U-20 squad and as a result, Alianza Lima defeated them 6–0. The first-team squad did not play because the club did not pay them for several months.

== Teams ==
Locations of the 2007 Primera División teams

Team	City	Stadium	Capacity
Alianza Atlético	Sullana	Campeones del 36	8,000
Alianza Lima	Lima	Alejandro Villanueva	35,000
Cienciano	Cusco	Garcilaso	42,056
Coronel Bolognesi	Tacna	Jorge Basadre	19,850
Deportivo Municipal	Lima	Nacional	45,574
Melgar	Arequipa	Mariano Melgar	20,000
Sport Áncash	Huaraz	Rosas Pampa	8,000
Sport Boys	Callao	Miguel Grau	15,000
Sporting Cristal	Lima	San Martín de Porres	18,000
Total Clean	Arequipa	Mariano Melgar	20,000
Universidad San Martín	Lima	San Martín de Porres	18,000
Universitario	Lima	Monumental	80,093

== Torneo Apertura ==
=== Standings ===
Pos	Team	Pld	W	D	L	GF	GA	GD	Pts	Qualification
1	Universidad San Martín	22	13	5	4	44	22	+22	44	2008 Copa Libertadores second stage
2	Cienciano	22	10	7	5	32	22	+10	37	
3	Sport Áncash	22	9	7	6	30	22	+8	34 (Note: Bolognesi forfeited against Sport Áncash in Round 14. 2-0 win awarded to Sport Áncash.)	
4	Sport Boys	22	9	7	6	33	29	+4	34	
5	Universitario	22	9	5	8	31	31	0	32	
6	Alianza Lima	22	9	8	5	31	23	+8	31 (Note: Alianza Lima were docked 4 points for failing to pay debts owed to two former players.)	
7	Melgar	22	8	5	9	32	38	−6	29	
8	Alianza Atlético	22	6	10	6	23	23	0	28	
9	Deportivo Municipal	22	6	6	10	25	30	−5	24	
10	Sporting Cristal	22	5	7	10	25	35	−10	22	
11	Total Clean	22	6	2	14	28	45	−17	20	
12	Coronel Bolognesi	22	4	7	11	22	36	−14	19	

Updated to match(es) played on June 10, 2007. Source: Peruvian Football Apertura 2007
Rules for classification: 1) points; 2) goal difference; 3) number of goals scored.

=== Results ===
Home \ Away	AAS	ALI	CIE	BOL	DMU	MEL	ÁNC	SBA	CRI	TCL	USM	UNI
Alianza Atlético		0–1	2–2	2–0	2–1	0–0	2–2	0–0	0–0	1–0	2–2	3–0
Alianza Lima	2–0		2–1	0–0	1–0	1–1	2–0	2–2	1–1	3–0	4–1	1–2
Cienciano	2–1	0–0		3–0	2–0	2–3	1–0	1–1	1–0	2–2	1–2	0–1
Coronel Bolognesi	1–1	2–0	2–3		2–2	1–1	0–0	0–2	3–1	1–3	1–1	2–3
Deportivo Municipal	1–1	2–2	1–1	1–0		1–2	1–1	1–1	1–2	3–0	0–1	2–1
Melgar	1–0	2–1	2–2	2–5	0–1		1–2	1–4	2–0	3–1	0–3	2–1
Sport Áncash	1–1	2–2	0–1	2–0	3–0	1–0		4–1	2–0	4–1	1–1	1–0
Sport Boys	0–1	2–1	0–1	1–0	2–0	4–4	1–0		0–1	2–1	2–0	1–1
Sporting Cristal	1–1	1–1	2–2	0–0	3–1	1–3	0–2	1–3		4–1	0–3	3–1
Total Clean	0–2	1–2	0–2	3–0	1–3	3–2	3–2	2–1	2–1		2–3	1–2
Universidad San Martín	3–0	2–0	0–2	1–2	2–1	3–0	4–0	4–0	2–2	1–0		2–2
Universitario	3–1	1–2	1–0	4–0	0–2	1–0	0–0	3–3	3–1	1–1	0–3	

Updated to match(es) played on November 3, 2007. Source: Peruvian Football Apertura 2007 Fixture
Legend: Blue = home team win; Yellow = draw; Red = away team win.

== Torneo Clausura ==
=== Standings ===
Pos	Team	Pld	W	D	L	GF	GA	GD	Pts	Qualification
1	Coronel Bolognesi	22	10	6	6	27	15	+12	36	2008 Copa Libertadores second stage
2	Universitario	22	9	8	5	27	22	+5	35	
3	Cienciano	22	10	4	8	35	28	+7	34	
4	Alianza Lima	22	9	7	6	29	25	+4	34	
5	Sport Áncash	22	9	6	7	26	27	−1	33	
6	Sporting Cristal	22	7	9	6	21	23	−2	30	
7	Universidad San Martín	22	7	6	9	25	24	+1	27	
8	Melgar	22	5	11	6	18	17	+1	26	
9	Alianza Atlético	22	6	8	8	17	22	−5	26	
10	Total Clean	22	7	4	11	22	27	−5	25	
11	Deportivo Municipal	22	6	6	10	24	38	−14	24	
12	Sport Boys	22	4	11	7	25	28	−3	23	

Updated to match(es) played on December 10, 2007. Source: Peruvian Football Clausura 2007
Rules for classification: 1) points; 2) goal difference; 3) number of goals scored.

=== Results ===
Home \ Away	AAS	ALI	CIE	BOL	DMU	MEL	ÁNC	SBA	CRI	TCL	USM	UNI
Alianza Atlético		0–0	3–0	0–0	1–0	1–0	1–1	2–1	0–0	1–0	2–1	0–0
Alianza Lima	2–1		1–2	3–2	6–0	0–0	3–0	1–2	0–1	2–1	0–5	1–1
Cienciano	2–0	3–0		1–0	4–0	0–0	2–1	3–0	2–0	3–1	4–0	2–3
Coronel Bolognesi	1–0	0–0	6–2		1–0	2–0	2–0	3–1	0–1	3–0	0–1	0–0
Deportivo Municipal	3–2	0–1	1–1	1–2		0–0	2–0	2–2	1–0	1–0	2–2	3–2
Melgar	0–0	1–1	4–1	0–2	1–0		0–2	2–0	0–0	2–2	2–1	0–1
Sport Áncash	3–2	1–1	1–1	0–0	3–1	0–2		2–2	3–1	1–0	1–0	2–1
Sport Boys	0–0	1–2	0–0	2–2	1–1	1–1	1–1		3–0	3–0	1–0	1–1
Sporting Cristal	1–0	1–2	1–0	1–0	3–3	1–1	2–0	1–1		2–2	1–1	1–0
Total Clean	4–1	2–0	1–0	1–0	4–1	0–0	0–1	1–0	1–1		2–0	0–1
Universidad San Martín	3–0	0–0	3–1	0–2	0–1	1–0	2–1	1–1	1–1	3–0		0–2
Universitario	0–0	1–3	2–1	1–1	2–1	2–2	1–2	3–1	2–1	1–0	0–0	

Updated to match(es) played on December 10, 2007. Source: Peruvian Football Clausura 2007 Fixture
Legend: Blue = home team win; Yellow = draw; Red = away team win.

== Aggregate table ==
Pos	Team	Pld	W	D	L	GF	GA	GD	Pts	Qualification or relegation
1	Universidad San Martín (C)	44	20	11	13	69	44	+25	71	2008 Copa Libertadores second stage
2	Cienciano	44	20	11	13	67	50	+17	71	2008 Copa Libertadores first stage
3	Sport Áncash	44	18	13	13	56	49	+7	67	2008 Copa Sudamericana first stage
4	Universitario	44	18	13	13	58	53	+5	67	2008 Copa Sudamericana Preliminary
5	Alianza Lima	44	18	15	11	60	48	+12	65 (Note: Alianza Lima were docked 4 points for failing to pay debts owed to two former players.)	
6	Sport Boys	44	13	18	13	58	58	0	57	
7	Melgar	44	13	16	15	50	55	−5	55	
8	Coronel Bolognesi	44	14	13	17	49	51	−2	55	2008 Copa Libertadores second stage
9	Alianza Atlético	44	12	18	14	40	45	−5	54	
10	Sporting Cristal	44	12	16	16	46	58	−12	52	
11	Deportivo Municipal (R)	44	12	12	20	49	68	−19	48	Relegation to 2008 Segunda División
12	Total Clean (R)	44	13	6	25	50	72	−22	45	Relegation to 2008 Segunda División

Updated to match(es) played on December 10, 2007. Source: Peruvian Football Aggregate Table
Rules for classification: 1) points; 2) goal difference; 3) number of goals scored.
(C) Champions; (R) Relegated

== Season finals ==
No season finals were contested since the Apertura winners Universidad San Martín de Porres failed to finish in the top six of the Torneo Clausura and the Clausura winners Coronel Bolognesi failed to finish in the top six of the Torneo Apertura. Therefore, San Martín won the national title due to the team's better positioning on the aggregate table.

== Top scorers ==
Sources:Peru.com Peru.com

19 goals

- (Peru) Johan Fano (Universitario)

18 goals

- (Peru) Ysrael Zúñiga (Melgar)

17 goals

- (Peru) Paul Cominges (Coronel Bolognesi)

16 goals

- (Paraguay) Richard Estigarribia (Sport Áncash)

15 goals

- (Peru) Pedro García (U. San Martín)

13 goals

- (Peru) Hernán Rengifo (U. San Martín)
- (Uruguay) Mario Leguizamón (U. San Martín)
- (Peru) José Fernández (Cienciano)

12 goals

- (Peru) Junior Viza (Alianza Lima)
- (Argentina) Sebastián Dominguez (Total Clean)

== See also ==
- 2007 Peruvian Segunda División
- 2007 Copa Perú
