= Wilkin Cavero =

Peruvian footballer (born 1978)

Personal information
- Full name: Wilkin Omar Cavero Manzanilla
- Date of birth: 24 March 1978 (age 48)
- Place of birth: Pisco, Peru
- Height: 1.86 m (6 ft 1 in)
- Position: Forward

Senior career*
Years	Team	Apps	(Gls)
1996–1997	Sport Boys	?	(0)
1998	Alfonso Ugarte de Puno		
1999	Cienciano	?	(1)
2000	Unión Minas	?	(3)
2001	Alianza Atlético	?	(0)
2001	Sport Coopsol	?	(1)
2002	Deportivo Aviación	?	(4)
2003	Olímpico Somos Perú	?	(22)
2004	Sport Boys	19	(2)
2005	Unión Huaral	7	(0)
2006	Atlético Minero	?	(16)
2007	UTC		
2008	Deportivo Aviación		
2009	América Cochahuayco		
2010	Deportivo Coopsol	5	(1)
2011	U América FC		
2012	Deportivo Municipal		
2012	Hijos de Acosvinchos		
2012	Willy Serrato		
2023	Juventud Santa Rosa		
- * Club domestic league appearances and goals

Wilkin Omar Cavero Manzanilla (born on 24 March 1978) is a Peruvian professional footballer who played as forward.

== Playing career ==
Having come from Sport Boys, Cavero made his debut in the Peruvian first division on the 30th day of the 1996 championship in Sport Boys' 2–0 victory over Guardia Republicana.

After some unsuccessful stints in the first division between 1996 and 2001, he signed with Deportivo Aviación (now Deportivo Coopsol) in 2002 in the second division. It was in the second division that he achieved his best results, finishing as top scorer twice: in 2003 with Olímpico Somos Perú (22 goals) and in 2006 with Atlético Minero (16 goals). He is also the all-time top scorer in the Peruvian second division with 76 goals scored in 10 seasons.

In 2023, 11 years after his retirement from playing, Cavero returned to action, playing for Juventud Santa Rosa, a club participating in the Copa Perú.

== Honours ==
Olímpico Somos Perú

- Peruvian Segunda División Top scorer: 2003 (22 goals)

Atlético Minero

- Peruvian Segunda División Top scorer: 2006 (16 goals)
