= Jorge Lozada (footballer) =

Peruvian footballer (born 1987)

Personal information
- Full name: Jorge Guillermo Lozada Baldwin
- Date of birth: 30 March 1987 (age 39)
- Place of birth: Trujillo, Peru
- Height: 1.78 m (5 ft 10 in)
- Position: Forward

Youth career
- Universitario

Senior career*
| Years | Team | Apps | (Gls) |
| 2004–2007 | Universitario | | |
| 2005–2007 | → América Cochahuayco (loan) | | |
| 2008 | Sport Águila | ? | (12) |
| 2009 | León de Huánuco | | |
| 2010 | Defensor San José | | |
| 2011 | Inti Gas | ? | (1) |
| 2012 | José Gálvez FBC | 0 | (0) |
| 2013 | Carlos A. Mannucci | | |
| 2014 | Sport Chavelines | ? | (42) |
| 2015–2016 | Deportivo Hualgayoc | | |
| 2017 | Alfonso Ugarte de Chiclín | | |

International career
| 2003 | Peru U17 | | |
- * Club domestic league appearances and goals

Jorge Guillermo Lozada Baldwin (born on 30 March 1987) is a Peruvian former professional footballer who played as forward.

== Playing career ==
Jorge Lozada made his debut in the Peruvian 1st division within the Universitario de Deportes in 2004 under the orders of Marcelo Trobbiani during a match on the third day of the championship against FBC Melgar (result 1–1). He played the last 20 minutes of the Universitario–Vélez Sarsfield match during the 2006 Copa Libertadores (result 0–1).

He joined Sport Águila in 2008, where he became the top scorer in the second division championship with 12 goals. In 2009, he joined León de Huánuco and won the Copa Perú. The rest of his career remained unremarkable, and after a few stints with Inti Gas (now Ayacucho FC), José Gálvez FBC and Carlos A. Mannucci, he retired after a final experience with Alfonso Ugarte de Chiclín in 2017.

Although he never played for Peru at the senior international level, he was selected for the under-17 team for the 2003 South American U-17 Championship in Bolivia.

== Honours ==
Sport Águila

- Peruvian Segunda División Top scorer: 2008 (12 goals)

León de Huánuco

- Copa Perú: 2009
