= Jesús Reyes (footballer, born 1982) =

Peruvian footballer (1982–2017)

Personal information
- Full name: Jesús Reyes Guadalupe
- Date of birth: 21 March 1982
- Place of birth: Chincha Alta, Peru
- Date of death: 24 September 2017 (aged 35)
- Place of death: Lima, Peru
- Position: Forward

Youth career
- Sporting Cristal

Senior career*
Years	Team	Apps	(Gls)
2000	Juan Aurich		
2001	Sporting Cristal B		
2003	UTC		
2004–2005	Sport Áncash		
2006	U. César Vallejo		
2007	Froebel Deportes		
2008	ADT		
2008–2009	Sport Huancayo		
2011	Deportivo Municipal		
2011	Pacífico FC		
2012–2015	Alianza Universidad		
2016	Unión Tarapoto		
- * Club domestic league appearances and goals

Jesús Reyes Guadalupe (21 March 1982 – 24 September 2017) was a Peruvian professional footballer who played as forward.

== Biography ==
=== Playing career ===
A product of Sporting Cristal's youth academy, Jesús Reyes Guadalupe struggled to break into the first team and had to settle for playing with the B team in the second division in 2001.

He had the opportunity to distinguish himself at clubs in the interior of the country, including Sport Áncash, Sport Huancayo, and especially Alianza Universidad, where he finished as the second division's top scorer twice, in 2012 and 2013.

Although he has never been called up to the Peruvian national team, he has a few caps for the U17 and U20 national teams.

=== Death ===
He died following a heart attack on September 24, 2017, during a football match with friends in the Rímac District of Lima.

== Honours ==
Sport Áncash

- Copa Perú: 2004

Sport Huancayo

- Copa Perú: 2008

Alianza Universidad

- Peruvian Segunda División Top scorer (2): 2012 (12 goals), 2013 (13)
