= Chumpitaz =

Chumpitaz is a surname. Notable people with the surname include:

- Héctor Chumpitaz (born 1943), Peruvian footballer
- Tito Chumpitaz (born 1967), Peruvian footballer and manager
- Javier Chumpitaz (born 1984), Peruvian footballer
- Iván Chumpitaz (born 1990), Peruvian footballer
