= 2006 Torneo Descentralizado =

Torneo Descentralizado
- Season: 2006
- Dates: 3 February 2006 – 27 December 2006
- Champions: Alianza Lima; 22nd Primera División title
- Runner up: Cienciano
- Relegated: José Gálvez; Unión Huaral
- Copa Libertadore: Alianza Lima (Second stage); Cienciano (Second stage); Sporting Cristal (First stage)
- Copa Sudamericana: Coronel Bolognesi (Preliminary round); Universitario (Preliminary round)
- Goals: 639
- Average goals/game: 2.42
- Top goalscorer: Miguel Mostto (22 goals)
- Biggest home win: Universitario 5-0 Unión Huaral (2007-06-25)
- Biggest away win: Alianza Atlético 1-4 Cristal
- Highest scoring: José Gálvez 4–3 Sport Áncash (2006-12-17)

The 2006 Torneo Descentralizado (known as the Copa Cable Mágico for sponsorship reasons) was the ninetieth season of Peruvian football. A total of 12 teams competed in the tournament, with Sporting Cristal as the defending champion. Alianza Lima won its twenty-second Primera División title after beating Cienciano in the final playoffs.

The season began on February 3, 2006, and ended on December 27, 2006.

== Changes from 2005 ==
=== Structural changes ===
- Number of teams reduced from 13 to 12.
- Season final to be played over two legs (home and away) instead of one leg at a neutral venue.
- The relegation would be decided by the season aggregate table; three-season average relegation table removed.

=== Promotion and relegation ===
Universidad César Vallejo and Atlético Universidad finished the 2005 season in 12th and 13th place, respectively, on the three-season average table and thus were relegated to the Segunda División. They were replaced by the champion of the Copa Perú 2005 José Gálvez.

=== Team changes ===
Promoted from 2005 Copa Perú	Relegated from 2005 Primera División
▲ José Gálvez (1st)	▼ Universidad César Vallejo (12th) ▼ Atlético Universidad (13th)

== Season overview ==
Alianza Lima won the Apertura tournament which allowed them to qualify to the Copa Libertadores 2007. Universitario and Cienciano tied for first in the Clausura tournament and were forced to play a playoff. The playoff was a single game, played on a neutral ground, in Trujillo at Estadio Mansiche. Cienciano won the playoff 2–1, qualifying to the Copa Libertadores 2007. Sporting Cristal placed second on the aggregate table, which allowed them to qualify to the first stage of the Copa Libertadores 2007. The winners of the Apertura and Clausura tournaments, Alianza Lima and Cienciano, played in a two-legged final. Both teams won their home games, but due to goal difference, Alianza Lima won their twenty-second national title. Unión Huaral placed last on the aggregate table which meant they were relegated to the second division. José Gálvez FBC and Sport Boys tied for second-to-last place. A playoff was contested and Sport Boys won 5–4 in the penalty shootout after a 0–0 draw.

== Teams ==
Locations of the 2006 Primera División teams

Team	City	Stadium	Capacity
Alianza Atlético	Sullana	Campeones del 36	8,000
Alianza Lima	Lima	Alejandro Villanueva	35,000
Cienciano	Cusco	Garcilaso	42,056
Coronel Bolognesi	Tacna	Jorge Basadre	19,850
Melgar	Arequipa	Mariano Melgar	20,000
José Gálvez	Chimbote	Manuel Gomez Arellano	8,000
Sport Áncash	Huaraz	Rosas Pampa	8,000
Sport Boys	Callao	Miguel Grau	15,000
Sporting Cristal	Lima	San Martín de Porres	18,000
Unión Huaral	Huaral	Julio Lores Colan	10,000
Universidad San Martín	Lima	Nacional	18,000
Universitario	Lima	Monumental	80,093

== Torneo Apertura ==
=== Standings ===
Pos	Team	Pld	W	D	L	GF	GA	GD	Pts	Qualification
1	Alianza Lima	22	13	7	2	33	13	+20	46	2007 Copa Libertadores Second Stage
2	Sporting Cristal	22	13	6	3	37	17	+20	45	
3	Coronel Bolognesi	22	9	7	6	32	24	+8	34	
4	Cienciano	22	9	6	7	26	17	+9	33	
5	Universidad San Martín	22	9	6	7	30	30	0	33	
6	Universitario	22	8	7	7	30	22	+8	31	
7	Alianza Atlético	22	8	5	9	26	35	−9	29	
8	Sport Áncash	22	6	7	9	24	31	−7	25	
9	Unión Huaral	22	6	6	10	20	30	−10	24	
10	José Gálvez	22	6	4	12	20	30	−10	22	
11	Melgar	22	5	7	10	20	32	−12	22	
12	Sport Boys	22	3	6	13	17	34	−17	15	

Updated to match(es) played on May 2, 2008. Source: Peruvian Football Apertura 2006
Rules for classification: 1) points; 2) goal difference; 3) number of goals scored.

=== Results ===
Home \ Away	AAS	ALI	CIE	BOL	GAL	MEL	ÁNC	SBA	CRI	HUA	USM	UNI
Alianza Atlético		0–3	3–1	1–3	0–0	3–1	2–2	2–0	1–4	3–2	2–1	0–0
Alianza Lima	2–0		1–0	2–2	2–0	4–1	2–0	1–0	1–0	2–0	2–0	1–1
Cienciano	3–0	0–0		3–1	3–0	1–1	1–0	3–0	2–0	0–0	1–2	0–1
Coronel Bolognesi	2–0	1–2	4–2		1–0	3–0	1–1	3–0	0–1	1–0	2–2	1–0
José Gálvez	2–2	0–2	1–2	1–0		2–0	3–0	1–0	1–2	0–3	2–4	1–1
Melgar	3–1	2–1	0–0	0–0	2–0		2–4	1–2	0–0	3–1	1–2	0–2
Sport Áncash	0–2	1–1	0–1	1–2	3–1	0–0		3–2	1–0	0–0	1–0	2–1
Sport Boys	2–1	1–1	0–2	0–0	0–1	0–0	1–1		1–1	2–3	1–1	1–2
Sporting Cristal	3–0	2–0	1–1	3–1	2–1	3–0	2–0	2–0		1–1	1–0	3–1
Unión Huaral	0–1	0–1	1–0	2–2	0–0	1–1	2–1	0–3	0–1		3–2	1–0
Universidad San Martín	0–1	1–1	0–0	2–1	0–3	1–0	3–3	2–1	2–2	1–0		1–0
Universitario	1–1	1–1	1–0	1–1	1–0	1–2	2–0	3–0	3–3	5–0	2–3	

Updated to match(es) played on 2006. Source:
Legend: Blue = home team win; Yellow = draw; Red = away team win.

== Torneo Clausura ==
=== Standings ===
Pos	Team	Pld	W	D	L	GF	GA	GD	Pts	Qualification
1	Universitario	22	12	5	5	34	24	+10	41	Clausura play-off
2	Cienciano (O)	22	13	2	7	40	31	+9	41	Clausura play-off
3	Coronel Bolognesi	22	12	3	7	32	20	+12	39	
4	Alianza Lima	22	11	5	6	27	17	+10	38	
5	Universidad San Martín	22	10	4	8	24	21	+3	34	
6	Sporting Cristal	22	9	4	9	24	15	+9	31	
7	Melgar	22	8	7	7	23	22	+1	31	
8	Sport Boys	22	9	4	9	26	28	−2	31	
9	José Gálvez	22	6	6	10	24	29	−5	24	
10	Sport Áncash	22	6	5	11	26	39	−13	23	
11	Alianza Atlético	22	5	6	11	29	40	−11	21	
12	Unión Huaral	22	4	3	15	15	38	−23	15	

Updated to match(es) played on May 2, 2008. Source: Peruvian Football Clausura 2006
Rules for classification: 1) points; 2) goal difference; 3) number of goals scored.
(O) Play-off winners

=== Results ===
Home \ Away	AAS	ALI	CIE	BOL	GAL	MEL	ÁNC	SBA	CRI	HUA	USM	UNI
Alianza Atlético		1–1	4–1	4–2	3–3	0–0	4–2	2–2	0–0	2–0	2–3	0–0
Alianza Lima	3–0		1–2	0–0	1–0	1–0	3–0	1–2	0–0	2–1	3–1	1–0
Cienciano	4–1	2–1		3–1	1–0	2–0	1–3	1–0	2–1	5–1	0–1	3–3
Coronel Bolognesi	1–0	1–1	1–2		2–1	2–0	3–0	3–0	0–1	1–0	1–2	4–1
José Gálvez	4–0	0–0	1–2	0–3		0–0	4–3	3–0	1–0	2–1	0–0	1–3
Melgar	2–1	3–2	1–2	1–0	2–0		1–1	4–1	2–1	2–1	2–0	1–1
Sport Áncash	1–0	1–0	1–3	0–1	1–1	1–1		1–0	1–1	2–0	1–1	3–0
Sport Boys	2–0	0–1	2–1	0–2	1–1	2–0	3–2		0–1	4–1	0–0	0–0
Sporting Cristal	3–1	0–1	1–0	1–2	3–0	2–0	3–0	0–1		4–0	0–2	0–1
Unión Huaral	1–2	0–1	1–1	0–0	2–1	0–0	3–1	1–2	1–0		0–2	0–1
Universidad San Martín	2–1	0–1	4–1	2–0	0–1	0–0	2–0	2–1	0–2	0–1		0–1
Universitario	3–1	3–2	2–1	1–2	1–0	2–1	4–1	1–3	0–0	3–0	3–0	

Updated to match(es) played on 2006. Source:
Legend: Blue = home team win; Yellow = draw; Red = away team win.

=== Clausura play-off ===
20 December 2006
19:00

Universitario	1–2	Cienciano
Piero Alva 77' (pen.)		Edison Chará 71'; Juan Carlos Mariño 89'

Estadio Mansiche, Trujillo
Referee: Héctor Pacheco

Cienciano advanced to the season finals.

== Finals ==
23 December 2006
19:30

Cienciano	1–0	Alianza Lima
Miguel Mostto 37'

Estadio Garcilaso, Cusco
Referee: Manuel Garay
27 December 2006
20:00

Alianza Lima	3–1	Cienciano
Ernesto Arakaki 22'; Carlos Lugo 36' (o.g.); Flavio Maestri 52'		Juan Carlos Mariño 49'

Estadio Alejandro Villanueva, Lima
Referee: George Buckley

Alianza Lima won 3–2 on aggregate; 2006 season champion

== Aggregate table ==
Pos	Team	Pld	W	D	L	GF	GA	GD	Pts	Qualification or relegation
1	Alianza Lima (C)	44	24	12	8	60	30	+30	84	2007 Copa Libertadores second stage (Note: Alianza Lima and Cienciano qualified to the 2007 Copa Libertadores as Apertura and Clausura champions respectively.)
2	Sporting Cristal	44	22	10	12	61	32	+29	76	2007 Copa Libertadores first stage
3	Cienciano	44	22	8	14	66	48	+18	74	2007 Copa Libertadores second stage
4	Coronel Bolognesi	44	21	10	13	64	44	+20	73	2007 Copa Sudamericana preliminary round
5	Universitario	44	20	12	12	64	46	+18	72	2007 Copa Sudamericana preliminary round
6	Universidad San Martín	44	19	10	15	54	51	+3	67	
7	Melgar	44	13	14	17	43	54	−11	53	
8	Alianza Atlético	44	13	11	20	55	75	−20	50	
9	Sport Áncash	44	12	12	20	50	70	−20	48	
10	Sport Boys (O)	44	12	10	22	43	62	−19	46	Relegation play-off
11	José Gálvez (R)	44	12	10	22	44	59	−15	46	Relegation play-off
12	Unión Huaral (R)	44	10	9	25	35	68	−33	39	Relegation to 2007 Segunda División

Updated to match(es) played on May 2, 2008. Source: Peruvian Football Aggregate 2006
Rules for classification: 1) points; 2) goal difference; 3) number of goals scored.
(C) Champions; (O) Play-off winners; (R) Relegated

=== 10th/11th place play-off ===
20 December 2006
15:30

José Gálvez	0–0 (a.e.t.)	Sport Boys
Penalties
Sergio Ibarra (penalty scored); Cristian Ortiz (penalty missed); Víctor Reyes (penalty scored); Sebastián Domínguez (penalty scored); Alexander Sánchez (penalty scored); Armando González (penalty missed)	4–5	(penalty scored) José Herrera; (penalty scored) Jair Céspedes; (penalty scored) Julio Landauri; (penalty missed) Juan Quiñones; (penalty scored) Gianfranco Labarthe; (penalty scored) Milton Marquillo

Estadio Alejandro Villanueva, Lima
Referee: Victor Hugo Rivera

José Gálvez relegated to Segunda División.

== See also ==
- 2006 Peruvian Segunda División
- 2006 Copa Perú
