= José Mallqui =

Peruvian politician

José Eucebio Mallqui Beas

Member of Congress
- In office 26 July 2006 – 26 July 2011
- Constituency: Ancash

Personal details
- Party: National Unity
- Other political affiliations: Christian People’s Party
- Occupation: Politician

José Eucebio Mallqui Beas is a Peruvian politician. He served as Congressman representing Ancash for the 2006–2011 term, and belonged to the National Unity party. He is also the president of the football (soccer) team Sport Ancash.
