= Club Deportivo Pacífico FC =

Peruvian football club

- Full name: Club Deportivo Pacífico FC
- Nicknames: El Gigante de Lima Norte; El Equipo de Fano
- Founded: January 1, 1960
- Ground: Estadio Iván Elías Moreno, Lima
- Capacity: 15,000
- Chairman: (Peru) Ricardo Gálvez
- Manager: (Peru) Tito Chumpitaz
- League: Liga 3
Home colours	Away colours

Club Deportivo Pacífico FC is a Peruvian football club. Based in the San Martín de Porres District, in the City of Lima, it plays in the Liga 3, which is Peru's third division. The club was founded in 1960.

== History ==
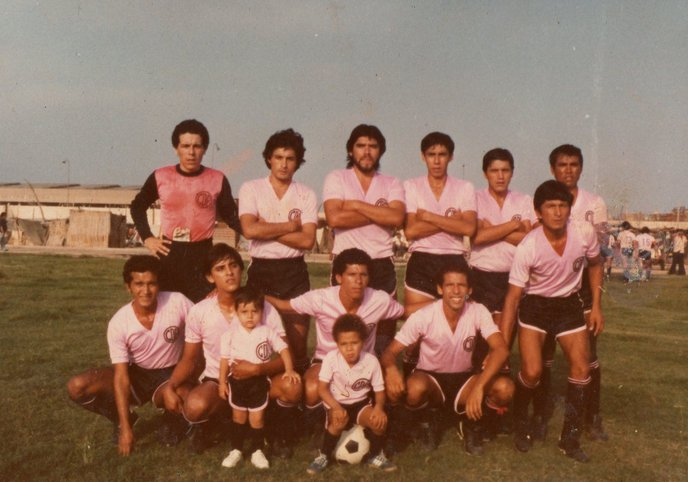
Pacífico in 1983

The club was founded on the January 1, 1960 under the name of Club Deportivo Pacífico in the city of San Martín de Porres, Lima.

In the 2011 Copa Perú, the club was defeated by Real Garcilaso in the finals and was granted promotion to the 2012 Peruvian Segunda División.

The team performed very well in the Segunda División where it only lost two games and achieved promotion to the Primera División from winning the second division for the first time. It competed in the 2013 Torneo Descentralizado. The club was relegated to the 2014 Peruvian Segunda División, when it was defeated by Unión Comercio in the relegation playoff.

=== Pacífico FC SMP ===
In 2023, the club created its first affiliate team called Club Pacífico FC SMP. The team joined the Second Division of San Martín de Porres and achieved first place in Group A, securing its promotion to the first division. Meanwhile, the club participated in the final playoff for the second division championship title. The club defeated Alameda F.C. 3-0 and became the champion of the district's second division.

== Statistics and results in First Division ==
=== League history ===
Season	Div.	Pos.	Pl.	W	D	L	GF	GA	P	Notes
2013	1st	15	44	10	14	20	31	62	44	15/16 Regular season

== Honours ==
=== Senior titles ===
Keys

- Record
- ^{(s)} Shared record

Type	Competition	Titles	Runner-up	Winning years	Runner-up years
National (League)	Segunda División	1	—	2012	—
National (League)	Copa Perú	—	1	—	2011
Regional (League)	Región IV	1	—	2011	—
Regional (League)	Liga Departamental de Lima	—	2	—	2011, 2024
Regional (League)	Liga Provincial de Lima	1	1	2011	2024
Regional (League)	Liga Distrital de San Martín de Porres	4	1	1999, 2010, 2024, 2026	2011
Regional (League)	Segunda Distrital de San Martín de Porres	1	1	2023	2008

== See also ==
- List of football clubs in Peru
- Peruvian football league system
