= Carlos Gonzales (footballer, born 1989) =

Peruvian footballer (born 1989)

Personal information
- Full name: Carlos Jairsinho Gonzales Ávalos
- Date of birth: 20 December 1989 (age 36)
- Place of birth: Lima, Peru
- Height: 1.65 m (5 ft 5 in)
- Position: Forward

Team information
- Current team: Atlético Grau

Senior career*
Years	Team	Apps	(Gls)
2011	Alianza Lima	2	(0)
2012–2014	Inti Gas	59	(6)
2015	Sporting Cristal	9	(0)
2016	Unión Comercio	32	(0)
2017	Ayacucho	36	(0)
2018	Sport Huancayo	16	(1)
2019	Pirata FC		
2019	Deportivo Coopsol	4	(0)
2020–	Atlético Grau	2	(0)

International career^{‡}
2014–	Peru	1	(0)
- * Club domestic league appearances and goals as of 5 March 2019 ‡ National team caps and goals as of 13 August 2014

Carlos Jairsinho Gonzales Ávalos (born 20 December 1989) is a Peruvian footballer who currently plays for Pirata FC as a forward.

== International career ==
Gonzales played his first international game with the senior national team on 6 August 2014 against Panama (3–0), after he came on as a substitute for Víctor Cedrón in the 54th minute of that game.

== Honours ==
Alianza Lima

- Copa Ciudad de Rosario (1): 2011
- Copa Ciudad de Rosario melvin (1): 2011
