= 2007 Copa Perú =

Copa Perú
- Season: 2007
- Champions: Juan Aurich

The 2007 Copa Perú season (Spanish: Copa Perú 2007), the promotion tournament of Peruvian football.

The tournament has 5 stages. The first four stages are played as mini-league round-robin tournaments, except for third stage in region IV, which is played as a knockout stage. The final stage features two knockout rounds and a final four-team group stage to determine the two promoted teams.

The 2007 Peru Cup started with the District Stage (Spanish: Etapa Distrital) on February. The next stage was the Provincial Stage (Spanish: Etapa Provincial) which started, on June. The tournament continued with the Departamental Stage (Spanish: Etapa Departamental) on July. The Regional Staged followed. The National Stage (Spanish: Etapa Nacional) started on November. The winner and runner-up of the National Stage will be promoted to the First Division.

== Departmental Stage ==
The following list shows the teams that qualified for the Regional Stage.

Department	Team	Location
Amazonas	Unión Santo Domingo	Chachapoyas
Amazonas	Amazonas	Chachapoyas
Ancash	Academia Sipesa	Nuevo Chimbote
Ancash	Sport Rosario	Huaraz
Apurímac	Deportivo Educación	Abancay
Apurímac	José María Arguedas	Andahuaylas
Apurímac	Deportivo Curibamba	Andahuaylas
Arequipa	IDUNSA	Arequipa
Arequipa	Unión Minas de Orcopampa	Orcopampa
Ayacucho	Sport Huamanga	Ayacucho
Ayacucho	Froebel Deportes	Ayacucho
Cajamarca	Deportivo Municipal (San Ignacio)	San Ignacio
Cajamarca	Deportivo Davy	Cajamarca
Callao	Independiente Ayacucho	Callao
Callao	Atlético Pilsen Callao	Callao
Callao	Atlético Barrio Frigorífico	Callao
Cusco	Deportivo Garcilaso	Cusco
Cusco	Deportivo Municipal (Echarate)	Echarate
Huancavelica	Deportivo Municipal (Anchonga)	Anchonga
Huancavelica	Deportivo Municipal (Ccochaccsa)	Ccochaccasa
Huánuco	León de Huánuco	Huánuco
Huánuco	Alianza Universidad	Huánuco
Ica	Juventud Miraflores	Chincha
Ica	Sport Victoria	Ica
Junín	Minera Corona	Jauja
Junín	Sport Águila	Huancayo
La Libertad	Sport Vallejo	Trujillo
La Libertad	Carlos A. Mannucci	Trujillo

Department	Team	Location
Lambayeque	Juan Aurich	Chiclayo
Lambayeque	Cruzada Deportiva	Etén
Lima	Cooperativa Bolognesi	Barranco
Lima	Óscar Benavides	Ate Vitarte
Lima	Defensor Villa del Mar	Villa El Salvador
Loreto	UNAP	Iquitos
Loreto	CNI	Iquitos
Madre de Dios	MINSA	Tambopata
Madre de Dios	Fray Martín de Porres	Puerto Maldonado
Moquegua	Academia Ticsani	Moquegua
Moquegua	Deportivo GER	Ilo
Pasco	Columna Pasco	Cerro de Pasco
Pasco	Deportivo Municipal (Yanahuanca)	Yanahuanca
Piura	Atlético Torino	Talara
Piura	Cosmos	Talara
Puno	Real Carolino	Puno
Puno	ADESA	Azángaro
San Martín	El Tumi	Tarapoto
San Martín	Unión Tarapoto	Tarapoto
Tacna	Defensor UNTAC	Tacna
Tacna	Bolognesi Zepita	Ciudad Nueva
Tumbes	Unión Pacífico	Tumbes
Tumbes	Sporting Pizarro	Tumbes
Ucayali	UNU	Pucallpa
Ucayali	Deportivo Hospital	Pucallpa

== Regional Stage ==
The following list shows the teams that qualified for the Regional Stage.

=== Region I ===
Region I includes qualified teams from Amazonas, Lambayeque, Tumbes and Piura region.

==== Group A ====
Pos	Team	Pld	W	D	L	GF	GA	GD	Pts	Qualification	SPP	COS	USD	CDP
1	Sporting Pizarro	6	3	3	0	12	4	+8	12	National stage		1–1	3–0	2–0
2	Cosmos	6	3	3	0	11	4	+7	12		1–1		2–0	2–0
3	Unión Santo Domingo	6	1	1	4	5	12	−7	4		0–3	2–2		3–0
4	Cruzada Deportiva	6	1	1	4	4	12	−8	4		2–2	0–3	2–0	

Legend: Blue = home team win; Yellow = draw; Red = away team win.

==== Group B ====
Pos	Team	Pld	W	D	L	GF	GA	GD	Pts	Qualification	JAU	TOR	UPA	AMA
1	Juan Aurich	6	4	2	0	28	6	+22	14	National stage		2–0	10–1	9–1
2	Atlético Torino	6	3	1	2	18	8	+10	10		2–2		5–0	7–0
3	Unión Pacífico	5	1	1	3	6	21	−15	4		2–2	3–2		W.O.
4	Amazonas	5	1	0	4	4	21	−17	3		0–3	1–2	2–0	

Legend: Blue = home team win; Yellow = draw; Red = away team win.

==== Regional Final ====
Team 1	Score	Team 2
Juan Aurich	4–2	Sporting Pizarro

=== Región II ===
Region II includes qualified teams from Ancash, Cajamarca, La Libertad and San Martín region.

==== Group A ====
Pos	Team	Pld	W	D	L	GF	GA	GD	Pts	Qualification	SPV	ETT	ASI	MSI
1	Sport Vallejo	6	3	2	1	13	6	+7	11	National stage		1–1	1–1	7–2
2	El Tumi	6	3	1	2	10	9	+1	10		1–0		3–1	3–1
3	Academia Sipesa	6	2	1	3	13	11	+2	7		0–2	4–2		7–1
4	Deportivo Municipal (San Ignacio)	6	2	0	4	9	19	−10	6		1–2	2–0	2–0	

Legend: Blue = home team win; Yellow = draw; Red = away team win.

==== Group B ====
Pos	Team	Pld	W	D	L	GF	GA	GD	Pts	Qualification	TAR	DPD	CAM	SRO
1	Unión Tarapoto	6	3	2	1	9	8	+1	11	National stage		0–0	3–2	2–1
2	Deportivo Davy	6	3	1	2	9	8	+1	10		4–2		2–0	3–2
3	Carlos A. Mannucci	6	2	3	1	12	8	+4	9		0–0	2–0		3–1
4	Sport Rosario	6	2	0	4	11	13	−2	6		1–2	3–1	3–2	

Legend: Blue = home team win; Yellow = draw; Red = away team win.

=== Region III ===
Region III includes qualified teams from Loreto and Ucayali region.

Pos	Team	Pld	W	D	L	GF	GA	GD	Pts	Qualification	UNU	HOS	UNA	CNI
1	UNU	6	3	2	1	9	8	+1	11	National stage		0–2	2–1	1–0
2	Deportivo Hospital	6	3	1	2	9	8	+1	10	National stage	0–1		1–1	4–1
3	UNAP	6	2	3	1	12	8	+4	9		3–3	4–0		2–1
4	CNI	6	0	2	4	6	12	−6	2		2–2	1–2	1–1	

Legend: Blue = home team win; Yellow = draw; Red = away team win.

=== Región IV ===
Region IV includes qualified teams from Lima and Callao region. This region played as a knockout cup system and the finalists qualified.

==== First Stage ====
Team 1	Agg.	Team 2	1st leg	2nd leg
Óscar Benavides	2–0	Atlético Pilsen Callao	1–0	1–0
Defensor Villa del Mar	4–1	Independiente Ayacucho	2–1	2–0
Cooperativa Bolognesi	7–0	Atlético Barrio Frigorífico	2–0	5–0

==== Semifinals ====
Team 1	Agg.	Team 2	1st leg	2nd leg
Óscar Benavides	5–1	Independiente Ayacucho	4–0	1–1
Defensor Villa del Mar	0–1	Cooperativa Bolognesi	0–0	0–1

==== Regional Final ====
Team 1	Score	Team 2
Óscar Benavides	0–0 (1–4 p)	Cooperativa Bolognesi

=== Región V ===
Region V includes qualified teams from Junín, Pasco and Huánuco region.

==== Group A ====
Pos	Team	Pld	W	D	L	GF	GA	GD	Pts	Qualification	SPH	JVM	DMC
1	Sport Huamanga	4	3	0	1	8	3	+5	9	National stage		2–0	3–0
2	Juventud Miraflores	4	2	0	2	7	7	0	6		2–1		3–0
3	Deportivo Municipal (Ccochaccasa)	4	1	0	3	5	10	−5	3		1–2	4–2	

Legend: Blue = home team win; Yellow = draw; Red = away team win.

==== Group B ====
Pos	Team	Pld	W	D	L	GF	GA	GD	Pts	Qualification	VIC	FRO	DMA
1	Sport Victoria	4	3	0	1	9	6	+3	9	National stage		1–0	2–1
2	Froebel Deportes	4	3	0	1	9	7	+2	9		2–1		3–2
3	Deportivo Municipal (Anchonga)	4	0	0	4	6	11	−5	0		2–3	1–3	

Legend: Blue = home team win; Yellow = draw; Red = away team win.

===== Tiebreaker =====
Team 1	Score	Team 2
Sport Victoria	2–1	Froebel Deportes

==== Regional Final ====
Team 1	Agg.	Team 2	1st leg	2nd leg
Sport Huamanga	3–0	Sport Victoria	0–0	3–0

=== Región VI ===
Region VI includes qualified teams from Ayacucho, Huancavelica and Ica region. Two teams qualified from this stage.

==== Group A ====
Pos	Team	Pld	W	D	L	GF	GA	GD	Pts	Qualification	SÁG	DMY	LEÓ
1	Sport Águila	4	2	1	1	6	3	+3	7	National stage		1–0	5–2
2	Deportivo Municipal (Yanahuanca)	4	2	0	2	2	2	0	6		1–0		1–0
3	León de Huánuco	4	1	0	3	2	6	−4	3		0–0	1–0	

Legend: Blue = home team win; Yellow = draw; Red = away team win.

==== Group B ====
Pos	Team	Pld	W	D	L	GF	GA	GD	Pts	Qualification	ALI	CPA	MCO
1	Alianza Universidad	4	4	0	0	6	0	+6	12	National stage		1–0	3–0
2	Columna Pasco	4	1	0	3	2	4	−2	3		0–1		2–1
3	Minera Corona	4	1	0	3	2	6	−4	3		0–1	1–0	

Legend: Blue = home team win; Yellow = draw; Red = away team win.

==== Regional Final ====
Team 1	Score	Team 2
Sport Águila	1–0	Alianza Universidad

=== Región VII ===
Region VII includes qualified teams from Arequipa, Moquegua and Tacna region.

==== Group A ====
Pos	Team	Pld	W	D	L	GF	GA	GD	Pts	Qualification	UMO	GER	DUN
1	Unión Minas de Orcopampa	4	3	0	1	6	2	+4	9	Región VII - Semifinals		2–1	3–0
2	Deportivo GER	4	2	0	2	4	5	−1	6	Región VII - Semifinals	1–0		2–1
3	Defensor UNTAC	4	1	0	3	3	6	−3	3		0–1	2–0	

Legend: Blue = home team win; Yellow = draw; Red = away team win.

==== Group B ====
Pos	Team	Pld	W	D	L	GF	GA	GD	Pts	Qualification	IDU	ATI	BZE
1	IDUNSA	4	3	0	1	15	1	+14	9	Región VII - Semifinals		4–0	7–1
2	Academia Ticsani	4	2	0	2	7	8	−1	6	Región VII - Semifinals	0–1		1–0
3	Bolognesi Zepita	4	0	0	4	4	18	−14	0		0–3	3–6	

Legend: Blue = home team win; Yellow = draw; Red = away team win.

==== Semifinals ====
Team 1	Agg.	Team 2	1st leg	2nd leg
IDUNSA	7–2	Deportivo GER	5–0	2–2
Unión Minas de Orcopampa	2–2	Academia Ticsani	1–1	1–1

===== Tiebreaker =====
Team 1	Score	Team 2
Unión Minas de Orcopampa	2–0	Academia Ticsani

==== Regional Final ====
Team 1	Score	Team 2
IDUNSA	1–1 (5–3 p)	Unión Minas de Orcopampa

=== Región VIII ===
Region VIII includes qualified teams from Apurímac, Cusco, Madre de Dios and Puno region.

==== Group A ====
Pos	Team	Pld	W	D	L	GF	GA	GD	Pts	Qualification	DPG	DPE	RCA	FMP
1	Deportivo Garcilaso	6	5	0	1	16	5	+11	15	National stage		2–0	2–1	7–2
2	Deportivo Educación	6	4	0	2	12	6	+6	12		2–0		2–0	5–1
3	Real Carolino	6	2	0	4	9	11	−2	6		0–3	3–0		4–1
4	Fray Martín de Porres	6	1	0	5	7	22	−15	3		0–2	0–3	3–1	

Legend: Blue = home team win; Yellow = draw; Red = away team win.

==== Group B ====
Pos	Team	Pld	W	D	L	GF	GA	GD	Pts	Qualification	DCU	DPA	MIN	JMA	DME
1	Deportivo Curibamba	8	6	1	1	16	6	+10	19	National stage		2–1	2–1	1–1	4–0
2	ADESA	8	5	0	3	15	7	+8	15		1–2		4–0	4–0	1–0
3	MINSA	8	4	0	4	15	13	+2	12		1–2	2–0		5–1	1–0
4	José María Arguedas	8	2	1	5	9	22	−13	7		0–2	0–2	3–1		3–2
5	Deportivo Municipal (Echarate)	8	2	0	6	11	18	−7	6		2–1	1–3	1–4	5–1	

Legend: Blue = home team win; Yellow = draw; Red = away team win.

==== Regional Final ====
Team 1	Score	Team 2
Deportivo Garcilaso	1–1 (5–3 p)	Deportivo Curibamba

== National Stage ==
The National Stage started in November. The winners of the National Stage were promoted to the First Division. The runner-up played against the Second Division runner-up in which the winner would go to the First Division and the loser would join the Second Division.

Round of 16
Unión Tarapoto	2	0	2
Juan Aurich	1	2	3
Sporting Pizarro	2	0	2
Sport Vallejo	2	1	3
Deportivo Hospital	2	1	3
Cooperativa Bolognesi	0	1	1
Óscar Benavides	2	0	2
UNU	1	1	2
Sport Huamanga	1	0	1
Alianza Universidad	0	0	0
Sport Águila	3	0	3
Sport Victoria	1	1	2
Deportivo Curibamba	0	0	0
IDUNSA	0	1	1
Deportivo Garcilaso	4	0	4
Unión Minas (O)	1	3	4

Quarterfinals
Juan Aurich	1	2	3
Sport Vallejo	2	0	2
Deportivo Hospital	4	2	6
UNU	1	0	1
Sport Huamanga	4	1	5
Sport Águila	2	3	5
IDUNSA	1	2	3
Unión Minas (O)	0	0	0

Final Group
Juan Aurich	2	1	3
Deportivo Hospital	1	0	1
Sport Águila	1	1	2
IDUNSA	0	0	0

Champion & Runner-Up
Juan Aurich	0	2	2 (5)
Sport Águila	2	0	2 (4)

=== Round of 16 ===
Team 1	Agg.	Team 2	1st leg	2nd leg
Unión Tarapoto	2–3	Juan Aurich	2–1	0–2
Sporting Pizarro	2–3	Sport Vallejo	2–2	0–1
Deportivo Hospital	3–1	Cooperativa Bolognesi	2–0	1–1
Óscar Benavides	2–2	UNU	2–1	0–1
Sport Huamanga	1–0	Alianza Universidad	1–0	0–0
Sport Águila	5–4	Sport Victoria	3–1	0–1
Deportivo Curibamba	0–1	IDUNSA	0–0	0–1
Deportivo Garcilaso	4–4 (a)	Unión Minas de Orcopampa	4–1	0–3

=== Quarterfinals ===
Team 1	Agg.	Team 2	1st leg	2nd leg
Sport Vallejo	2–3	Juan Aurich	2–1	0–2
Deportivo Hospital	6–1	UNU	4–1	2–0
Sport Huamanga	5–4	Sport Águila	4–2	1–3
Unión Minas de Orcopampa	0–3	IDUNSA	0–1	0–2

=== Semifinals ===
Team 1	Agg.	Team 2	1st leg	2nd leg
Deportivo Hospital	1–3	Juan Aurich	1–2	0–1
Sport Águila	2–0	IDUNSA	1–0	1–0

=== Final ===
Team 1	Agg.	Team 2	1st leg	2nd leg
Sport Águila	2–2 (4–5 p)	Juan Aurich	2–0	0–2

== Promotion Playoff (2nd Copa Peru / 2nd Segunda Division) ==
Team 1	Score	Team 2
Atlético Minero	3–0	Sport Águila

- Atlético Minero to Primera Division and Sport Águila to Segunda Division.

== See also ==
- 2007 Torneo Descentralizado
- 2007 Peruvian Segunda División
