= Fabricio Lenci =

Argentine footballer

Personal information
- Full name: Fabricio German Lenci Mazzeto
- Date of birth: 24 February 1984 (age 42)
- Place of birth: San Nicolás de los Arroyos, Argentina
- Height: 1.85 m (6 ft 1 in)
- Position: Forward

Team information
- Current team: Argentinos Juniors
- Number: 9

Senior career*
Years	Team	Apps	(Gls)
2004–2005	Ancona	0	(0)
2005–2006	Matera	23	(7)
2006–2007	Campobasso	0	(0)
2007–2008	Central Córdoba	30	(7)
2009	San Telmo	21	(0)
2009–2010	Deportivo Moron	2	(2)
2010	Jorge Wilstermann	15	(4)
2011–2012	Sport Áncash	22	(24)
2012–2013	Crucero del Norte	31	(6)
2013–2014	Atlético Tucumán	16	(1)
2014–2015	San Martín	25	(8)
2015	Douglas Haig	39	(4)
2016	Juventud Unida	21	(13)
2016–	Argentinos Juniors	16	(3)
- * Club domestic league appearances and goals as of 02:32, 26 October 2017 (UTC)

Fabricio German Lenci Mazzeto (born February 24, 1984) is an Argentine professional footballer who plays as a forward for Argentine Primera División side Argentinos Juniors. Lenci also has a double nationality, the second one being Italian.

== Biography ==
In 2004, on the verge of turning 17, Lenci enrumbó abroad : thanks to their dual nationality ( Italian- Argentina ), the attacker lungo after a short time in French football, ended up as part of the campus of Northwest Ancona Calcio Italia club in those years was in Serie C2 . In the following two years, 2005 and 2006, remained in the Italian ascent playing a season at FC Matera and the Associazione Calcio Campobasso, both teams participating in Serie D (IV division of Italian football).

Following the European experience, in 2007, returned to Argentine football Lenci, specifically the Central Cordoba de Rosario, member club of the First B. With the Uruguayan box remained for two seasons, where he played 30 games and scored seven goals . In the second half of the 2008–09 season, the cassock Lenci San Telmo donned without the luck of the case, and that despite their commitment and dedication in his 21 presentations failed to score any goal. In the 2009–10 season, made landfall in Lenci Deportivo Morón, where he shared the attack with Lucio Ceresetto (ex- Bolognesi ), his scoring potential and left no doubt that he used to go outside again . Thus, the new location would be Bolivia.

In Jorge Wilstermann Champion Apertura 2010, Lenci came up for the second tournament of the year and depending on their performance, their presence in the aviator frame could be extended and dispute the Copa Libertadores . Valluno box arrived at the site to cover the Uruguayan Nicolas Raimondi (ex- University Athletic ), who left Lokomotiv Plovdiv of Bulgaria. With the flyer box played 15 games and scored four goals.

Fabricio Lenci had a short time in north transept where he made a spectacular 22 euentros juice hood and frame 7 goals which aroused interests of many clubs but opted to remain in the category and ficho atletico Tucuman .

In 2013 played its first match against San Martin de Tucuman it lost 1–0 after the second leg I became the first goal of the game with which atletico won 2-0 that friendly with aggregate of 2–1, would make his first official goal in the match against 11 for the date aldosivi .

== Honours ==
- Sport Ancash 2011 (Top Scorer 2011 Torneo Intermedio) 6 goals
