= Alianza Unicachi =

Peruvian football club

- Full name: Club Deportivo Alianza Unicachi
- Nicknames: "El azulado de Yunguyo", "Los leones azules" (The blue lion)
- Founded: 2010
- Ground: Estadio Enrique Torres Bellon, Puno
- Chairman: Miguel Pérez Eusebio
- Manager: Gustavo Buena González
- League: Copa Perú
- 2012: Segunda Division Peruana 9th(Relegated)
Home colours	Away colours

Alianza Unicachi is a Peruvian football club, playing in the city of Yunguyo, Puno, Peru.

== History ==
Alianza Unicachi is the result of the fusion of the clubs Alianza Porvenir and Deportivo Unicachi.

In the 2010 Copa Perú, the club qualified for the National Stage but was eliminated by Unión Comercio in the final.

In the 2011 Torneo Intermedio, the club was eliminated by Sporting Cristal in the quarterfinals.

In the 2012 Peruvian Segunda División, the club was relegated to the Copa Perú by economic problems.

== Historic Badges ==
2010

2011

== Honours ==
=== National ===
- Copa Perú: 0

Runner-up (1): 2010

=== Regional ===
- Región VIII: 1

Winners (1): 2010

- Liga Departamental de Puno: 1

Winners (1): 2010

- Liga Superior de Puno:

Runner-up (1): 2010

- Liga Distrital de Yunguyo: 1

Winners (1): 2009

- Liga Distrital de Villa El Salvador: 1

Runner-up (1): 2007

== See also ==
- List of football clubs in Peru
- Peruvian football league system
