= Estadio Municipal de Chorrillos =

Municipal stadium in Lima, Peru

- Cancha de los Muertos
- Interactive map of Estadio Municipal de Chorrillos
- Full name: Estadio Municipal de Chorrillos
- Location: Chorrillos, Lima, Peru
- Coordinates: 12°10′19.0286″S 77°1′38.9284″W
- Owner: Municipality of Chorrillos
- Capacity: 12,000
- Surface: Grass

Construction
- Opened: 1993
- Renovated: 2025

Tenant
- Deportivo Municipal

Estadio Municipal de Chorrillos is a municipal stadium in the Chorrillos District, Lima, Peru. It opened in 1993, and holds 12,000 people. The stadium's nickname is Cancha de los Muertos (Field of the Dead) because the stadium was built over a cemetery. It is the home stadium of Deportivo Municipal.

== History ==
The Estadio Municipal de Chorrilo was opened in 1993, inaugurated during the 1993 Torneo Descentralizado between Deportivo Municipal against Cienciano.

The stadium was left abandoned during the late 2010s and as a result, Deportivo Municipal moved to the Estadio Iván Elías Moreno located in the district of Villa El Salvador. In 2025, the stadium was renovated and Deportivo Municipal returned back for their participation in the Peruvian Tercera División.
