= Total Chalaco =

- Full name: Total Clean F.B.C.
- Founded: 21 December 2004
- Dissolved: 2011; 14 years ago
- Ground: Estadio Miguel Grau, Callao, Peru
- Capacity: 15,000
- Chairman: Felix Enciso
- Manager: (Argentina) Roque Alfaro
- League: Copa Perú
Home colours	Away colours

Total Chalaco was a professional Peruvian football club based in Callao. The club last played in the Peruvian Primera División in 2010. They placed last and were relegated and subsequently dissolved. The club was founded as Total Clean FBC, and played in Arequipa at the Estadio Mariano Melgar.

As Total Clean, they won the Copa Perú in 2006 and were promoted to the first division. They were relegated to the second division in 2007 but quickly ascended to the first division for 2009. The club was in a large amount of debt and sold 51% of the club to the vice-president of Atlético Chalaco. The club was renamed and relocated to Callao.

== History ==
The club was created in 2003 by a local laundry of Arequipa, named Total Clean. At first the team was only made up of employees and owners of the laundry. However, when the team reached a more competitive level, the owner of the laundry, Felix Enciso, scouted the Arequipean league to find more competitive players. His efforts were rewarded with the club playing in the Peruvian First Division. They were relegated from the First Division in 2007.

They were champions of the Segunda División Peruana in 2008, returning to the first division for 2009. Due to heavy financial problems, the club sold 51% of the club to Atletico Chalaco's vice-president. It is illegal for a club to buy its way into the first division, therefore Total Clean could not be renamed as Atletico Chalaco. Hence, the commercial name Total Chalaco was used. If Atletico Chalaco were to reach the first division, the directors would be forced to sell one of the clubs.

In the 2010 Torneo Descentralizado the team placed last and was relegated to the 2011 Segunda División Peruana. However, the team withdrew from the Segunda Division before it started and dissolved.

== Historic badges ==
2004 - 2008

== Honours ==
=== National ===
- Peruvian Segunda División:

Winners (1): 2008

- Copa Perú:

Winners (1): 2006

=== Regional ===
- Región VII:

Winners (1): 2006

- Liga Departamental de Arequipa:

Winners (1): 2006

- Liga Provincial de Arequipa:

Winners (1): 2006

- Liga Distrital de Sachaca:

Winners (1): 2006

== See also ==
- List of football clubs in Peru
- Peruvian football league system
