= Estadio Rosas Pampa =

Stadium in Huaraz, Peru

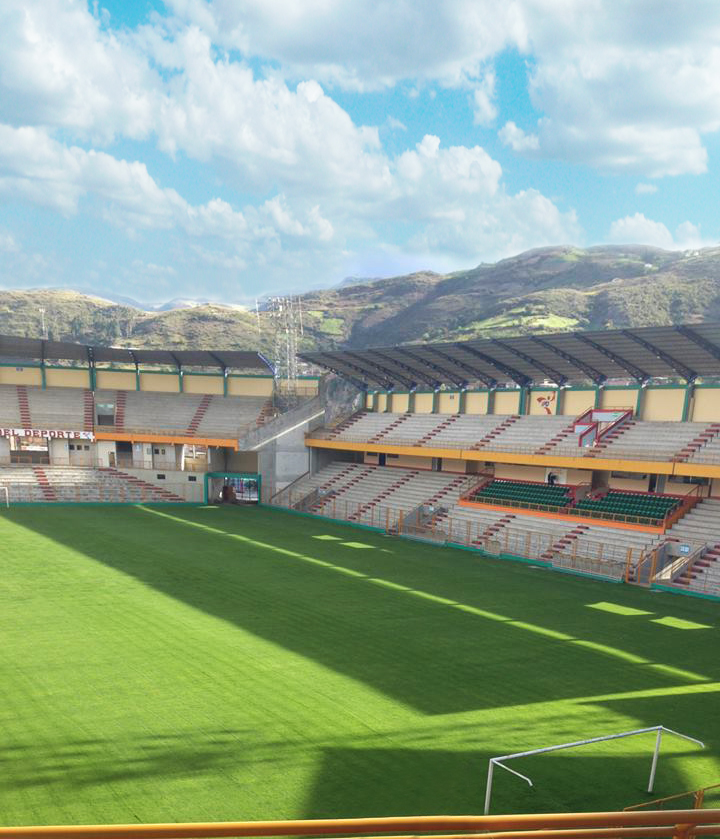
- Interactive map of Estadio Rosas Pampa
- Location: Huaraz - Peru
- Coordinates: 9°31′35.7″S 77°32′01.0″W
- Owner: Instituto Peruano del Deporte
- Capacity: 18,000
- Surface: Grass

Construction
- Built: 1945
- Renovated: August 8, 2010
- Construction cost: S/. 35.219.426

Tenants
- Sport Áncash; Sport Rosario

Estadio Rosas Pampa is a stadium in Huaraz, Peru. It is currently used by the football clubs Sport Áncash and Sport Rosario. The stadium's capacity is 18,000. Club Deportivo Municipal also played its games here until the 1999 Primera División when they were relegated to the Segunda División.

Located in Callejón de Huaylas in the Ancash Region, the stadium was inaugurated in 1945 and had only two stands (East and West). The stadium was renovated and the capacity increased to 18,000. This was done because Sport Áncash participated in its first international competition in 2018. However, the stadium was not finished in time to host its home games for that competition. Among its improvements are roofed stands, four light towers, a scoreboard, a special drainage system, broadcast booths, and offices for other sports that are housed under the stands. It was reopened on August 8, 2010 with a match between Sport Áncash and Hijos de Acosvinchos, in which the home side won 3–0.

The project cost S/. 35,219,426.
