= Sport Águila =

Peruvian football club

- Full name: Club Sport Águila
- Nickname: Los Aguileros
- Founded: December 25, 1947
- Ground: Estadio Huancayo, Huancayo
- Capacity: 20,000
- Chairman: Héctor Quispe Bernaola
- Manager: Miguel Guzmán
- League: Copa Perú
- 2016: Eliminated in Round of 16
Home colours	Away colours

Sport Águila is a Peruvian football club, playing in the city of Huancayo, Junín.

== History ==
In the 2007 Copa Perú, the club qualified to the National Stage, but was eliminated by Juan Aurich of Chiclayo in the finals.

In May 2010, IDUNSA and Sport Águila withdrew before the start of the 2010 Segunda División Peruana season being relegated to the Copa Perú.

== Honours ==
=== National ===
- Copa Perú
  - Runners-up (1): 2007

=== Regional ===
- Región VI
  - Winners (2): 2007, 2014
- Liga Departamental de Junín
  - Winners (1): 2016
  - Runners-up (2): 2007, 2013
- Liga Provincial de Huancayo
  - Winners (1): 2007
  - Runners-up (2): 2013, 2016
- Liga Distrital de Huancán
  - Winners (5): 2007, 2016, 2018, 2022, 2025
  - Runners-up (2): 2013, 2023

== See also ==
- List of football clubs in Peru
- Peruvian football league system
