= Estadio Municipal de Matucana =

- Matucana
- Interactive map of Estadio Municipal de Matucana
- Full name: Estadio Municipal de Matucana
- Location: Matucana, Peru
- Coordinates: 11.83792°S 76.37785°W
- Owner: Municipalidad de Matucana
- Capacity: 5,000
- Surface: Natural grass
- Field size: 105 x 70 m.

Construction
- Built: 1966
- Opened: July 28, 1966

Tenant
- Atlético Minero

Estadio Municipal de Matucana is a multi-use stadium in Matucana, Peru. It is currently used mostly for football matches and is the home stadium of Atlético Minero of the Peruvian Segunda División. The stadium holds 5,000 spectators. It was built in 1966 by the then mayor of the province Antonio León Aliaga with the support of the president of the chamber of deputies Javier Ortiz de Zevallos.
