= La Peña Sporting =

Peruvian football club

La Peña
- Full name: La Peña Sporting Club
- Founded: April 6, 1968
- Ground: Estadio Iván Elías Moreno, Lima
- Capacity: 10,000
- Chairman: Santiago Zamudio Escriba
- Manager: César Gonzales
- League: Copa Peru
Home colours

La Peña is a Peruvian football club, playing in the city of Lima, Peru.

The club was founded 1968 and plays in the Copa Perú, which is the third division of the Peruvian league.

== History ==
The club has played at the second level of Peruvian football on seven occasions, from 2003 until 2009.

In the 2009 Peruvian Segunda División, the club was relegated to the Copa Perú.

In the 2010 Copa Perú, the club was eliminated in the Regional Stage, by Cultural Géminis and Juventud Barranco.

== Historic Badges ==
2007-2008

2009

== Honours ==
=== National ===
- Liga Distrital de Lince: 11

1992, 1993, 1994, 1995, 1996, 1997, 1998, 1999, 2000, 2001, 2002.

== See also ==
- List of football clubs in Peru
- Peruvian football league system
