= Deportivo Universidad San Marcos =

Peruvian football club

Universidad Nacional Mayor de San Marcos
- Full name: Club Deportivo Universidad Nacional Mayor de San Marcos
- Nickname: Los Leones
- Founded: 2001
- Dissolved: 2012
- Ground: Estadio San Marcos, Lima, Peru
- Capacity: 67,500
Home colours	Away colours

Club Deportivo Universidad Nacional Mayor de San Marcos was a Peruvian football club based in Lima, Peru. The club was part of the National University of San Marcos and its last participation in a football league was in the 2011 Peruvian Segunda División. They first started competing in the 2001 season. Previously, the team had won five editions of the National Sporting University Games (Juegos Deportivos Universitarios Nacionales). Their 2006 season in the second division was the most notable as they fought Deportivo Municipal for promotion to the Primera División but they finished second and were not promoted. Universidad San Marcos played its home games at the university's Estadio Universidad San Marcos, located in the center of the National University of San Marcos' main campus in Lima. Due to financial difficulties in 2011, the club withdrew from the second division and folded in 2012 and the Peruvian Football Federation subsequently gave the club a 10-year ban from all competition.

== History ==
The football team of the Universidad Nacional Mayor de San Marcos, nicknamed The Lions, debuted in 2001. Previously, the football team had won five editions of the National Sporting University Games (Juegos Deportivos Universitarios Nacionales). The football team inspired the formation of a sports club (club deportivo) with its first president the teacher of the Faculty of Economic Sciences, César Díaz Lima, and its first manager Nicolás Nieri, former player of Sporting Cristal. They were district champions and promoted to the Segunda División.

In their first season, they placed fourth out of sixteen amongst reputable teams such as Deportivo Municipal, Unión Huaral, Sport Coopsol and Sporting Cristal B. The performance of the football team in the following seasons were less notable. However, their 2006 season was the most notable as they fought Deportivo Municipal for promotion to the first division. Unfortunately they finished second.

== Honours ==
=== National ===
- Peruvian Segunda División: 0

Runner-up (1): 2006

=== Regional ===
- Liga Departamental de Lima:

Winners (1): 2000

- Liga Provincial de Lima:

Winners (1): 2000

- Liga Distrital de Cercado de Lima:

Winners (3): 1984, 1999, 2000

== See also ==
- List of football clubs in Peru
- Peruvian football league system
