= Atlético Minero =

- Full name: Club Atlético Minero del Rímac
- Nickname(s): Los Mineros (The Miners)
- Founded: 1997
- Ground: Estadio Municipal de Matucana; Matucana, Peru
- Capacity: 5,000
- President: (Peru) Fernando Pajuelo
- Manager: (Peru) Lizandro Barbaran
- League: Peruvian Second Division
- 2013: Peruvian Second Division, 12th
| Home colours | Away colours | Third colours |

Club Atlético Minero is a Peruvian football club based in Matucana, located in the Department of Lima. It was founded in 1997 and was promoted to the Primera División Peruana in 2008 where it played for one season. It has played in the Peruvian Segunda Division ever since.

== History ==
The club was founded in 1997, in the Casapalca mining town under the name Unión Minas de Casapalca. The following year under Juan Diaz and Juan Flores, the club is merged with the club Boca Junior and renamed Atlético Minero, also taking on new and current symbol of the club, which is said it was based on the Brazilian Atletico Mineiro, one of the most successful teams in Latin America. Hector Gamarra, Denis De la Cruz and Fernando Pajuelo took over the club and became one of the most attractive teams of the Copa Perú. His first major campaign was in 2005, when it ranked first in the National Stage representing Lima and reached the quarterfinals where they were eliminated by José Gálvez FBC of Chimbote.

In 2006, the club was invited to the Second Division to fill one of the two vacancies. However, the invitees required that their home ground be a region without a team representing them in the first or second division. Minero changed its home ground to Huancayo, where they played the entire year.

In 2007, the club returned to Matucana and placed second in the Second Division. They played a playoff against the Copa Peru runner-up Sport Águila and won. They were promoted to the First Division. Descended to the Second Division in 2008 after losing a playoff game with Juan Aurich. Since that time remains in the Peruvian Second Division.

== Uniform ==
- First Uniform: Orange Shirt, Orange Shorts, Orange Socks.
- Second Uniform: Blue Shirt, Blue Shorts, Blue Socks.

== Honours ==
=== National ===
- Peruvian Segunda División
  - Runners-up (1): 2007

=== Regional ===
- Región IV
  - Winners (1): 2005
- Liga Departamental de Lima
  - Winners (1): 2005
  - Runner-up (1): 2003
- Liga Provincial de Huarochirí
  - Winners (3): 2003, 2004, 2024
- Liga Distrital de Chicla Casapalca
  - Winners (4): 2003, 2004, 2005, 2024

== See also ==
- List of football clubs in Peru
- Peruvian football league system
