= Sport Áncash =

- Full name: Club Sport Áncash
- Nicknames: La Amenaza Verde, Los Verdes, El Ancash
- Founded: 1967
- Ground: Estadio Rosas Pampa, Huaraz
- Capacity: 18,000
- Chairman: (Peru) José Mallqui
- Manager: (Peru) Eduardo Vargas
- League: Copa Perú
- 2019: Round of 16
Home colours	Away colours

Club Sport Áncash is a Peruvian football club, playing in the city of Huaraz. Sport Áncash was founded on April 22, 1967. The team plays its home games at Rosas Pampa stadium.

== History ==
=== Beginnings ===
The club was founded in 1960 by a group of young men from Huaraz and Chacas in Ancash. (Note: Noriega Barrón, Misael (2016). Remembranzas Chacasinas (in Spanish). Peru. pp. 75–76.) The team was named Sport Áncash after the street where many of the players lived which disappeared after the 1970 Ancash earthquake. The club was re-established on April 22, 1967 as Club Deportivo Comunitario Laboral Sport Áncash by one of the local labor unions. The club played for many years in the liga distrital de Huaraz. For many years after the earthquake the club was owned by various state and union organizations until 2004 when the future congressman José Mallqui took over as club president.

=== Significant Copa Perú Campaigns ===
The club would reach some national recognition when it reached the national stage of the 1976 Copa Perú. During the first years of the Copa Perú the six regional champions played a round robin tournament in Lima in which the team with the most points was promoted to the Peruvian Primera División. In 1976 Sport Áncash qualified to the final round robin. They reached the last game tied on points against Coronel Bolognesi. They would go on to lose 2–0 and with that lose their chances of reaching the Torneo Descentralizado. Sport Áncash would reach the regional stage in 1998 and 1999 but would not qualify to the national stage until 2000. During the 2000 Copa Perú, the club faced Atletico Grau. They would lose their away game 1–0 and win at home 0–3. Because only points and not goals were taken into consideration, a play-off game was played on neutral ground in Lima where Sport Áncash lost 3–1.

=== 2004 Copa Perú Championship ===
In 2004 under the leadership of José Mallqui as president and Tito Chumpitaz as coach, Sport Áncash would win the Copa Perú and make it to the Peruvian Primera División for the first time. Sport Áncash and Jose Gálvez both qualified to the regional stage that year as departamental champion and runner up, respectively. Even though they were both seeded into different groups they played each other in the regional final, which Sport Áncash won 1–0. Both teams also qualified to the national stage where they met again in the quarterfinals. Jose Gálvez won the first leg 4–1 and Sport Áncash the second 3–2. In a neutral play-off in Lima, Sport Áncash beat its departamental rival 1–0 to reach the semifinals. In the semifinals, they defeated Sport Alfonso Ugarte with a global score of 3–2. In the finals, they defeated one of the oldest teams in the country, Deportivo Municipal, who had qualified as the 2004 Peruvian Segunda División runner up. Because the Peruvian Segunda División was only played by Lima clubs at the time the Peruvian Football Federation took its promotion berth and had the winner and runner up automatically qualify to the Copa Perú national stage. The first leg was played in Huaraz and the second in the Estadio Nacional in Lima. Sport Áncash won by a global score of 4–1 and was promoted to the 2005 Torneo Descentralizado season.

=== Years in Peruvian top-flight ===
Sport Áncash started its first season in the first division with many of its players from the Copa Perú and with Rafael Castañeda as coach. That first year it finished 6th in the aggregated table as the best team not qualified to an international tournament. 2006 was not a good year for the club which had to fight to avoid relegation for most of the year. They should have been relegated anyway because of inscription problem with their squad members were it not for a questionable amnesty granted by the Peruvian Football Federation. 2007 was the best year for the club. Sport Áncash finished 3rd during the Torneo Apertura and 6th during the Torneo Clausura only three points away from the tournament champion. Over all it finished 3rd in the league which qualified it for the first international tournament in its history, the 2008 Copa Sudamericana alongside Universitario de Deportes. During 2008 the club finished 12th during the Torneo Apertura which saw the coach Jose Torres sacked. With the help of Antonio Alzamendi, Sport Áncash was able to fight for the Torneo Clausura and finish 3rd and 6th in the aggregated table only staying away from another international tournament by goal difference. In 2009 the club was not able to save itself from relegation by finishing 15th in the new 16 teams tournament only one point away from the 14th place occupied by Alianza Atletico. By this time the club owners started accumulating a massive debt which would later bring the club's down fall.

=== First Segunda Division Era ===
For the 2010 season the club finished 2nd in its first year in the Peruvian Segunda División behind Cobresol. José Mallqui was joined by Reynaldo Huayaney in an effort to control the massive amount of debt that the club carried over from its bad year in the Torneo Descentralizado. During the 2011 and 2012 seasons the club had two great years tainted by debt which saw it lose 12 points and 4 points respectively at the end of the tournament which brought it down from 2nd to 4th place during both tournaments. In 2013, Sport Áncash was not able to finish the season and the team folded.

=== Resurgence ===
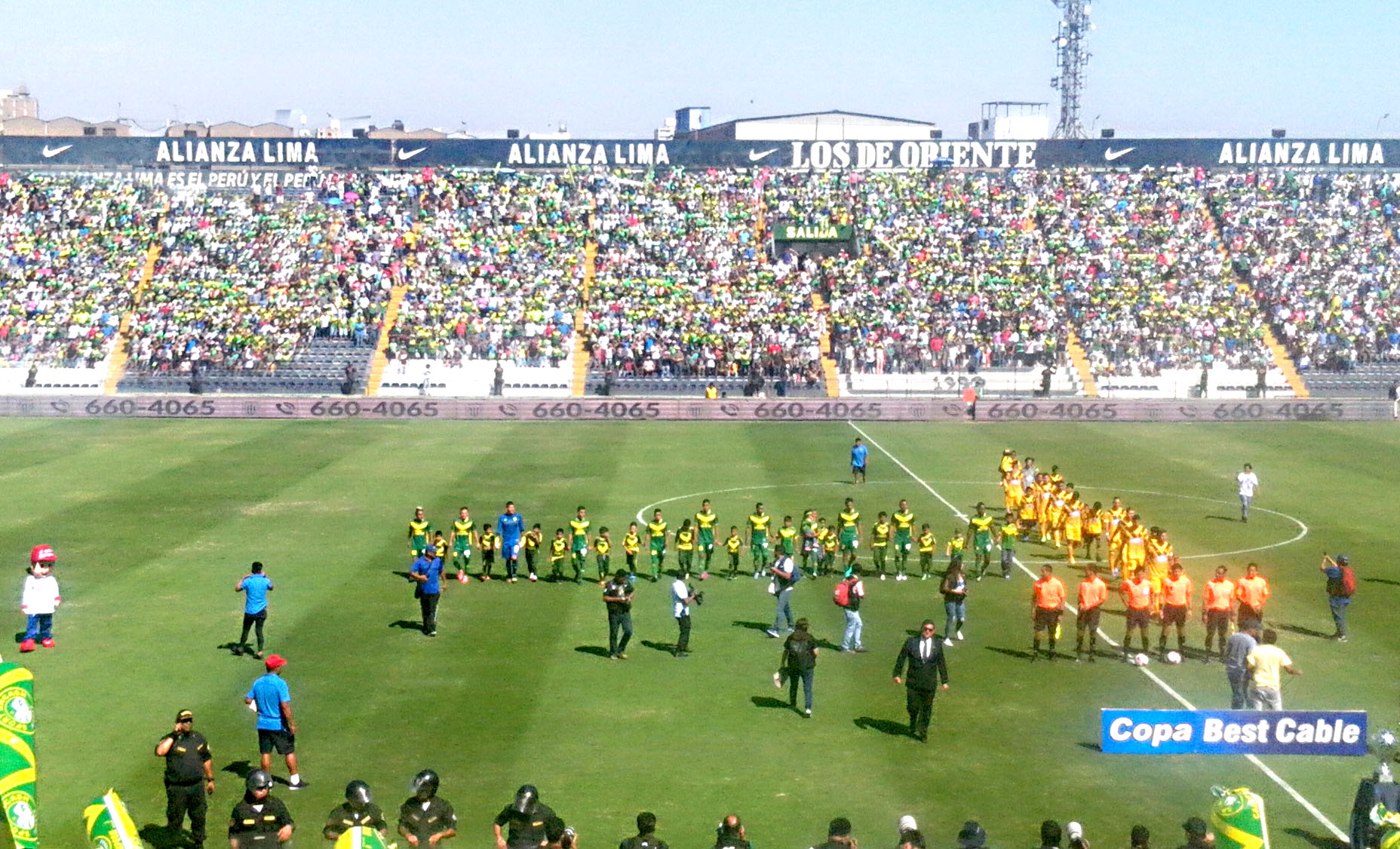
Sport Áncash lost the 2016 play-off match final against Academia Cantolao at Estadio Alejandro Villanueva for the Segunda División title.

In September 2013 the club collapse because of accumulation of debt and was re-launched by Mallqui under the name Sport Áncash Fútbol Club as a way to escape its many acreditors. This team started playing at the second division level in the Liga Distrital de Huaraz. By 2014 the club was once again in the local first division league completing a mediocre campaign. In 2015, Sport Áncash F.C. reached the national stage once again and was defeated in the quarterfinals by Cristal Tumbes. Because of its good performance it was invited to participate once more in the Peruvian Segunda División after a long financial examination during the 2016 season. During their first season in the Peruvian Segunda División, Sport Áncash tied on points with Academia Cantolao from Callao and forced a title play-off match which they lost 2–0.

== International tournaments ==
In 2008, in their first international participation, they faced Ñublense of Chile for the Copa Sudamericana. They lost in their visit 1–0 in Concepción and then they won 4–0 in Huancayo. In the second stage they faced Palmeiras of Brazil, being eliminated after drawing 0–0 in Lima and a lost 1–0 in São Paulo.

== Rivalries ==
Sport Áncash has had a long-standing rivalry with José Gálvez. The two clubs have had the distinction of being the only clubs to face each other in the top five levels of the Peruvian football league system and the now defunct domestic cup league, Copa del Inca. Sport Áncash has recently gained a rivalry against Sport Rosario who are also from Huaraz.

== Historic Badges ==
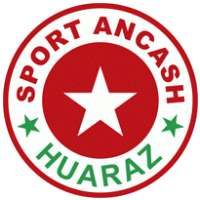
2004

== Honours ==
=== Senior titles ===
Keys

- Record
- ^{(s)} Shared record

Type	Competition	Titles	Runner-up	Winning years	Runner-up years
National (League)	Segunda División	—	2	—	2010, 2016
National (League)	Copa Perú	1	—	2004	—
National (Cups)	Torneo del Inca	—	1	—	2011
Regional (League)	Región II	2	2	2000, 2004	1998, 1999
Regional (League)	Liga Departamental de Áncash	9	12	1981, 1987, 1992, 1998, 1999, 2000, 2004, 2015, 2018	1973, 1974, 1975, 1977, 1979, 1982, 1984, 1997, 2001, 2003, 2019, 2026
Regional (League)	Liga Provincial de Ancash	20	—	1973, 1974, 1975, 1979, 1981, 1984, 1987, 1992, 1997, 1998, 1999, 2000, 2001, 2003, 2004, 2015, 2018, 2019, 2022, 2024	—
Regional (League)	Liga Distrital de Ancash	16	3	1975, 1979, 1981, 1984, 1987, 1992, 1997, 1998, 1999, 2000, 2001, 2003, 2004, 2015, 2024, 2026	2002, 2019, 2022

== Performance in CONMEBOL competitions ==
- Copa Sudamericana: 1 appearance

2008: Round of 16

=== Sport Áncash in South America ===
Season	Competition	Round	Country	Club	Home Leg	Away Leg	Aggregate
2008	Copa Sudamericana	First Stage	(Chile)	Ñublense	4–0	1–0	4–1
2008	Copa Sudamericana	Round of 16	(Brazil)	Palmeiras	0–0	1–0	0–1

== Current squad 2025 ==
Note: Flags indicate national team as defined under FIFA eligibility rules; some limited exceptions apply. Players may hold more than one non-FIFA nationality.

No.	Pos.	Nation	Player
-	GK	PER	Alonso Miñan
-	GK	PER	Luis Estrada
-	DF	PER	Diego García
-	DF	PER	Luis Mendoza
-	MF	PER	Arturo Bustinza
-	MF	PER	Felix Barahona
-	MF	PER	Piero Becerra
-	MF	PER	Anthony Vega
-	MF	PER	Joseph Olivera
-	MF	PER	Josshimar Pacheco
-	FW	PER	Junior Reyna
-	FW	PER	Robert Chávez

== Managers ==
- (Peru) Jesús Oropesa (2012)
- (Colombia) José Torres (2013)
- (Peru) Miguel Guzmán (2013)
- (Peru) Giancarlo Riega (2013)
- (Peru) Víctor Bullón (2013)
- (Peru) Medardo Arce (2014)
- (Peru) Víctor Bullón (2015)
- (Peru) Tito Chumpitaz (2015)
- (Peru) Francisco Melgar (2016)
- (Peru) Víctor Bullón (2016)
- (Paraguay) (Argentina) Jorge Amado Nunes (2016)
- (Peru) Celestino Huaranga (2016)
- (Italy) Orlando Maltese (2016–2017)
- (Colombia) Alejandro Guerrero (2017)
- (Peru) Paolo Maldonado (2017–2018)
- (Peru) Luis Redher (2018)
- (Argentina) (Italy) Matías Tatangelo (2018)
- (Peru) Juan Jayo (2018)
- (Peru) Juan Carlos Sandi (2018)
- (Peru) Nilton Gómez (2019)
- (Peru) Junior Fernández Bernable (2019–1920)
- (Peru) Eder Méndez Villavicencio (2021–2022)
- (Peru) Celestino Huaranga (2022–2023)
