= Matucana, Peru =

Matucana
- Town
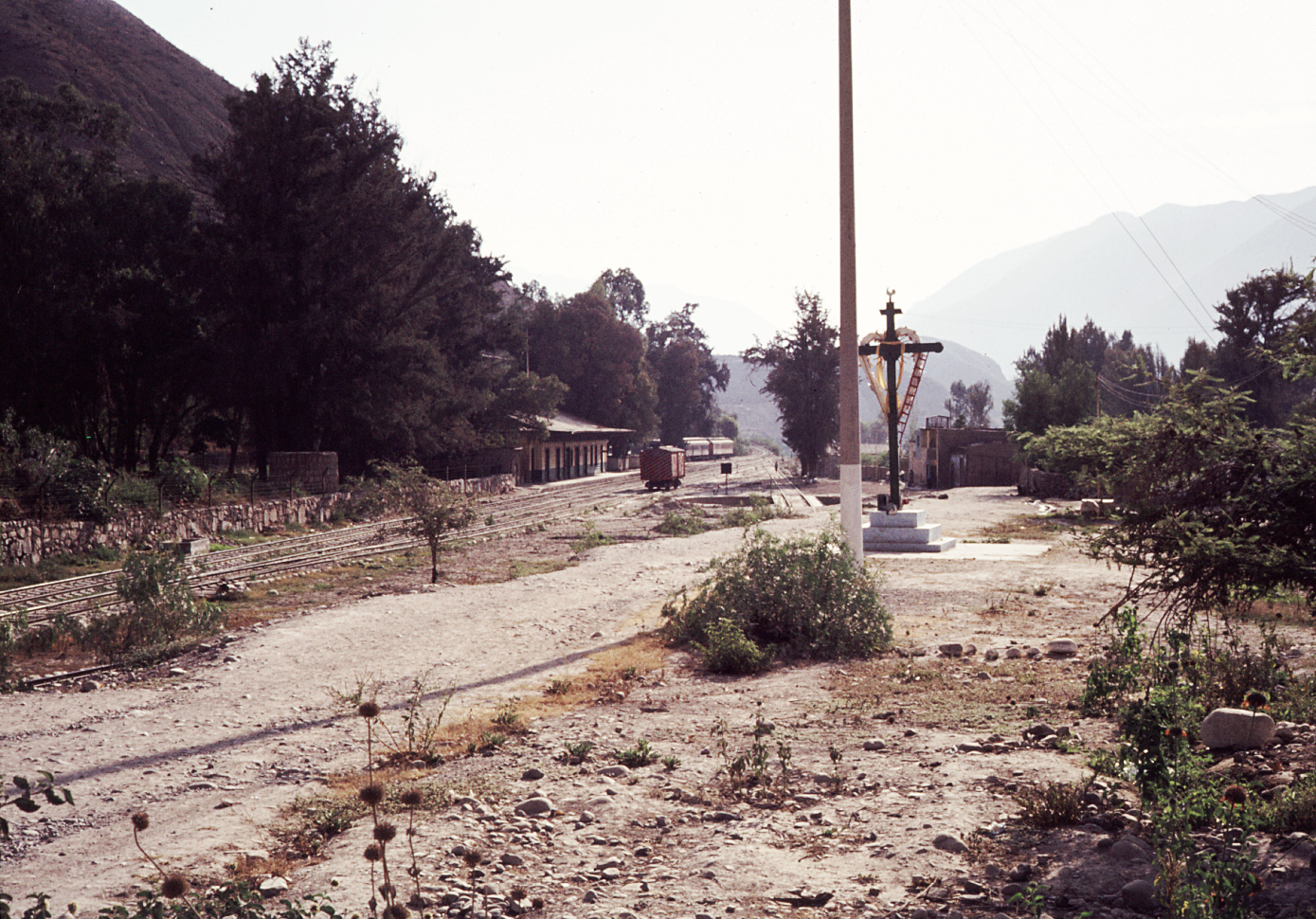
- A railroad near Matucana

- Location within Peru
- Coordinates: 11°50′41″S 76°23′10″W
- Country: Peru
- Region: Lima
- Province: Huarochirí
- District: Matucana
- Established: 1647

Government
  - Mayor: Eveling Feliciano Ordoñez (2019-2022)
- Elevation: 2,378 m (7,802 ft)

Population
  - Total: 5,768
- Time zone: UTC-5 (PET)

Matucana is a town in central Peru, capital of the Matucana District located in the Huarochirí Province, in the Department of Lima. It is located to the east of Lima at 2,378 m (7,802 ft) above sea level, along the Central Highway (Spanish: Carretera Central) at km 74.

== History ==
Matucana was founded in 1647 by Miguel de Castro y García, a descendant of one of Francisco Pizarro's Conquistadores. He discovered gold in the hills outside of Matucana at a site that was once a holy shrine for the Incas. Using Inca slaves to operate the mine, he became very wealthy and eventually returned to live in Lima, Peru. The gold mine was unfortunately buried in a huge avalanche triggered by the devastating Santa Ursula earthquake of October 21, 1756, which also caused great damage to the City of Lima.

== Climate ==
Matucana has a semi-arid climate (Köppen: BSk) with mild temperatures.

Matucana experiences relatively stable temperatures throughout the year, with minor variations between months. The dry season experiences larger diurnal air temperature variation, with warmer days and cooler nights, compared to the wet season. The yearly average high temperature is 21.4°C (70.5°F), while the yearly average low temperature is 9.8°C (49.6°F).

The total annual precipitation is 311.6 millimeters (12.27 inches). Matucana receives the majority of its precipitation during the wet season, which typically spans from January to March. The months from May to September experience almost no rainfall.

Climate data for Matucana (1991–2020)
| Month | Jan | Feb | Mar | Apr | May | Jun | Jul | Aug | Sep | Oct | Nov | Dec | Year |
|---|---|---|---|---|---|---|---|---|---|---|---|---|---|
| Mean daily maximum °C (°F) | 20.3 (68.5) | 20.0 (68.0) | 20.1 (68.2) | 21.0 (69.8) | 21.8 (71.2) | 21.8 (71.2) | 21.9 (71.4) | 22.3 (72.1) | 22.7 (72.9) | 22.4 (72.3) | 21.9 (71.4) | 20.9 (69.6) | 21.4 (70.5) |
| Mean daily minimum °C (°F) | 10.8 (51.4) | 10.9 (51.6) | 10.9 (51.6) | 10.1 (50.2) | 9.5 (49.1) | 8.5 (47.3) | 8.2 (46.8) | 8.4 (47.1) | 9.4 (48.9) | 9.8 (49.6) | 9.8 (49.6) | 10.7 (51.3) | 9.8 (49.6) |
| Average precipitation mm (inches) | 60.0 (2.36) | 76.7 (3.02) | 83.7 (3.30) | 25.9 (1.02) | 0.8 (0.03) | 0.1 (0.00) | 0.0 (0.0) | 0.3 (0.01) | 1.3 (0.05) | 8.2 (0.32) | 13.7 (0.54) | 40.9 (1.61) | 311.6 (12.27) |
Source: NOAA

== Society and culture ==
The City of Matucana is a popular destination for eco-tourists, as it has beautiful water falls in the deep valleys outside of the town and plentiful hiking trails. It is also the starting point for the increasingly popular "De Las Montanas y Mar" bicycle race held every year between Matucana and Lima.

The bicycle race starts at the Chez Victor Restaurant in Matucana and finishes at the La Rosa Nautica Restaurant in Lima. One of Don Miguel's descendants runs the Chez Victor restaurant in Matucana, while the La Rosa Nautica Restaurant is owned by the descendants of the Viceroy who granted the lands around Matucana to Don Miguel de Castro y Garcia.
