= Hijos de Acosvinchos =

Peruvian football club

- Full name: Club Deportivo Hijos Mutuos de Acosvinchos
- Founded: 13 October 1946; 79 years ago
- Ground: Estadio San Marcos, Lima, Peru
- Capacity: 67,500
- Club President: (Peru) Aldrin Pérez
- League: Segunda División Peruana
Home colours	Away colours

Club Deportivo Hijos Mutuos de Acosvinchos is a Peruvian football club based in Lima, located in the district of Ate. It was founded in 1946.

== History ==
The club was founded on 13 October 1946. In the 2006 Copa Perú, the club qualified to National Stage but was eliminated by Total Clean in the final.

In the 2012 Peruvian Segunda División, the club was relegated to the Copa Perú.

== Honours ==
=== National ===
- Copa Perú: 0

Runner-up (1): 2006

=== Regional ===
- Región IV: 0

Runner-up (1): 2006

- Liga Departamental de Lima: 2

Winners (2): 2005, 2006

- Liga Provincial de Lima: 1

Winners (1): 2005

- Liga Distrital de Ate: 4

Winners (4): 2001, 2002, 2003, 2005

- Liga Distrital de Breña: 0

Runner-up (1): 2014

== See also ==
- List of football clubs in Peru
- Peruvian football league system
