= U América FC =

Peruvian football club

- Full name: Club Deportivo U América FC
- Founded: 1980
- Ground: Estadio Monumental; Lima, Peru
- Capacity: 80,093
- League: Copa Perú
- 2013: Eliminated in the Province Stage
Home colours	Away colours

U América FC is a Peruvian football club, playing in the city of Lima.

== History ==
The club was founded with the name of América Cochahuayco, subsequently in 1996 the club changed by name Universitario de América until 1997. In the 2011, the club changed by name to U América FC.

The club was 1999 Segunda División Peruana champion, but was defeated by Deportivo Pesquero in the Promotion Play-off.

In the 2003 Segunda División Peruana, the club was relegated to the Copa Perú.

The club was promoted to the 2005 Segunda División Peruana as 2004 Liga Departamental de Lima champion.

In the 2011 Peruvian Segunda División, the club was relegated to the 2012 Copa Perú when it was defeated by Coronel Bolognesi in the relegation playoff. They qualified to the Regional Stage as Peruvian Segunda Division relegatees where they had a short one game campaign in which they lost to Márquez FC.

== Historic Badges ==
1980-2010

== Honours ==
=== National ===
- Peruvian Segunda División: 1

Winners (1): 1999

- Liga Distrital de San Luis: 2

Winners (2): 1992, 2004

== See also ==
- List of football clubs in Peru
- Peruvian football league system
