= 2013 Torneo Descentralizado =

Torneo Descentralizado
- Season: 2013
- Dates: 8 February 2013 – 18 December 2013
- Champions: Universitario (26th Title)
- Relegated: Pacífico; José Gálvez
- Copa Libertadores: Real Garcilaso; Universitario; Sporting Cristal
- Copa Sudamericana: Alianza Lima; Inti Gas; Universidad César Vallejo; UTC
- Matches: 356
- Top goalscorer: Víctor Rossel; Raúl Ruidíaz (21 goals each)
- Biggest home win: SC 5–0 CIE (Feb. 23); SC 5–0 IGD (Mar. 30); JA 6–1 CIE (July 20); LEÓ 5–0 USM (July 21); JA 5–0 LEÓ (Oct. 7); SC 5–0 PAC (Oct. 27)
- Biggest away win: JG 2–6 LEÓ (Apr. 13); PAC 1–5 ALI (Nov. 14)
- Highest scoring: 8 goals: USM 3–5 JG (Mar. 3); MEG 4-4 SHU (Oct. 26)
- Highest attendance: 46,824; Real Garcilaso @ Universitario (Dec. 15)
- Lowest attendance: 257; Juan Aurich @ León de Huánuco (Nov. 30)
- Total attendance: 1,562,344
- Average attendance: 4,389

The 2013 Torneo Descentralizado de Fútbol Profesional (known as the 2013 Copa Movistar for sponsorship reasons) is the 97th season of the highest division of Association Peruvian football. A total of 16 teams competed in the tournament, with Sporting Cristal as the defending champion. The Torneo Descentralizado began in February and ended in December 2013.

== Competition modus ==
The season was divided into 3 stages. In the first stage 16 teams played a round-robin home-and-away round for a total of 30 matches each. In the second stage the 16 teams were divided into 2 groups. In addition, the team ranked first at the end of the first stage was eligible to play the 2014 Copa Libertadores as Peru 3. Each team carried their records from the first stage into the second stage. Both groups played another round-robin home-and-away round for 14 matches. Bonus points were awarded to two teams based on the performance of their reserve teams in the 2013 Torneo de Promoción y Reserva before the first match of the second stage. The teams ranked first in each group at the end of the 14 matches advanced to the third stage. The two teams with the fewest points at the end of the second stage were relegated. In the third stage the championship was contested in a two-legged Play-off. The Play-off finalists qualified for the Copa Libertadores. The remaining international competition berths were determined by the season aggregate table.

== Teams ==
=== Team changes ===
Promoted from 2012 Segunda División	Promoted from 2012 Copa Perú	Relegated from 2012 Primera División
▲ Pacífico (1st)	▲UTC (1st)	▼ Sport Boys (15th) ▼ Cobresol (16th)

=== Stadia locations ===
Locations of the 2013 Primera División teams

Team	City	Stadium	Capacity
Alianza Lima	Lima	Alejandro Villanueva	35,000
Cienciano	Cusco	Garcilaso	40,000
Inti Gas	Ayacucho	Ciudad de Cumaná	15,000
José Gálvez	Chimbote	Manuel Rivera Sánchez	25,000
Juan Aurich	Chiclayo	Elías Aguirre	24,500
León de Huánuco	Huánuco	Heraclio Tapia	15,000
Melgar	Arequipa	Virgen de Chapi	40,217
Pacífico	Lima	Miguel Grau	17,000
Real Garcilaso	Cusco	Garcilaso	40,000
Sport Huancayo	Huancayo	Estadio Huancayo	20,000
Sporting Cristal	Lima	Alberto Gallardo	18,000
Unión Comercio	Nueva Cajamarca	IPD de Moyobamba	5,000
Universidad César Vallejo	Trujillo	Mansiche	25,000
Universidad San Martín	Lima	Alberto Gallardo	18,000
UTC	Cajamarca	Héroes de San Ramón	18,000
Universitario	Lima	Monumental	80,093

=== Personnel and kits ===
Note: Flags indicate national team as has been defined under FIFA eligibility rules. Players may hold more than one non-FIFA nationality.

Team	Manager	Captain	Kit manufacturer	Shirt sponsor
Alianza Lima	(Peru) Wilmar Valencia	(Peru) Henry Quinteros	Nike	none
Cienciano	(Uruguay) Mario Viera	(Peru) Santiago Acasiete	Walon	none
Inti Gas	(Colombia) César Tabares	(Peru) Nick Montalva	Real	Inti Gas
José Gálvez	(Peru) Javier Arce	(Peru) Paul Ramos	Real	SIDERPERU/Megaplaza
Juan Aurich	(Spain) José Mari Bakero	(Peru) Leandro Fleitas	Walon	Café Altomayo/Azúcar Pomalca
León de Huánuco	(Colombia) Édgard Ospina	(Peru) Johan Fano	Triathlon	Hongyan Trucks/Lishide Vehicles
Melgar	(Argentina) Marcelo Straccia	(Peru) Antonio Meza Cuadra	Marathon	none
Pacífico	(Peru) Juan Carlos Bazalar	(Peru) Johnny Vegas	Loma's	none
Real Garcilaso	(Peru) Freddy García	(Argentina) Diego Carranza	Marathon	I-RUN
Sport Huancayo	(Peru) Moisés Barack	(Peru) Sergio Ibarra	Manchete	Caja Municipal de Huancayo
Sporting Cristal	(Peru) Roberto Mosquera	(Peru) Carlos Lobaton	Umbro	Cerveza Cristal/Volkswagen
Unión Comercio	(Argentina) Fernando Nogara	(Peru) Juan Flores	Triathlon	New Holland/Olva Courier
Universidad César Vallejo	(Peru) Víctor Rivera	(Argentina) Carlos Galván	Walon	Universidad César Vallejo
Universidad San Martín	(Uruguay) Aníbal Ruiz	(Peru) Leao Butrón	Umbro	Herbalife
UTC	(Uruguay) Rafael Castillo	(Peru) Ricardo Ronceros	Umbro	Universidad Alas Peruanas
Universitario	(Argentina) Ángel Comizzo	(Peru) John Galliquio	Umbro	Hyundai

== First stage ==
=== Standings ===
Pos	Team	Pld	W	D	L	GF	GA	GD	Pts	Second Stage placement
1	Real Garcilaso	30	17	7	6	40	20	+20	57 (Note: Real Garcilaso was docked 1 point and penalized with 3 goals against.)	Liguilla A
2	Universitario	30	15	8	7	41	24	+17	53	Liguilla B
3	Sporting Cristal	30	14	7	9	51	33	+18	49	Liguilla A
4	UTC	30	13	8	9	33	27	+6	47	Liguilla B
5	Universidad César Vallejo	30	12	10	8	35	32	+3	46	Liguilla A
6	León de Huánuco	30	11	12	7	37	27	+10	45	Liguilla B
7	Alianza Lima	30	13	6	11	34	33	+1	45	Liguilla A
8	Inti Gas	30	11	10	9	41	38	+3	43	Liguilla B
9	Sport Huancayo	30	11	9	10	40	41	−1	42	Liguilla A
10	Cienciano	30	10	9	11	30	39	−9	39	Liguilla B
11	Melgar	30	8	12	10	32	33	−1	36	Liguilla A
12	Juan Aurich	30	8	9	13	37	37	0	33	Liguilla B
13	Pacífico	30	7	12	11	22	32	−10	33	Liguilla A
14	Universidad San Martín	30	8	6	16	26	44	−18	30	Liguilla B
15	Unión Comercio	30	6	8	16	24	40	−16	26	Liguilla A
16	José Gálvez	30	6	7	17	39	65	−26	25	Liguilla B

Updated to match(es) played on June 24, 2013. Source: ADFP - official site
Rules for classification: 1) points; 2) goal difference; 3) number of goals scored; 4) head-to-head record

=== Results ===
Home \ Away	ALI	CIE	MEL	IGD	JG	JA	LEÓ	PAC	RGA	CRI	SHU	UCO	UCV	USM	UTC	UNI
Alianza Lima		0–1	1–0	1–4	1–0	3–1	2–1	0–0	1–0	1–0	1–0	1–1	0–1	2–3	1–0	1–0
Cienciano	2–1		0–0	1–1	1–0	1–1	1–0	1–0	0–1	2–0	0–1	0–2	2–1	2–0	3–1	1–1
Melgar	0–2	1–2		1–2	1–0	2–0	1–1	2–0	0–2	3–0	2–0	2–1	2–2	1–0	0–0	2–2
Inti Gas	3–1	3–2	2–1		2–0	2–2	2–0	1–1	1–2	0–0	1–0	4–0	0–0	2–0	0–2	1–3
José Gálvez	2–2	3–2	1–2	2–2		2–2	2–6	3–1	0–0	2–1	2–1	4–1	1–1	1–2	0–2	1–3
Juan Aurich	0–1	6–1	2–1	1–1	3–1		0–2	0–0	0–1	3–0	1–1	2–0	1–0	0–1	2–1	1–2
León de Huánuco	2–2	1–0	0–0	0–0	0–0	1–1		3–0	1–0	1–2	2–2	1–0	2–2	5–0	2–0	2–0
Pacífico	1–2	0–0	0–0	1–0	2–1	1–0	0–0		1–0	1–1	2–1	1–1	2–1	3–0	0–0	0–1
Real Garcilaso	0–0	2–2	1–1	4–2	3–1	2–1	0–0	2–0		3–0	4–0	1–0	4–0	1–0	2–0	2–1
Sporting Cristal	2–2	5–0	0–0	5–0	4–0	1–0	3–1	2–2	2–1		2–2	2–0	4–2	1–0	1–1	4–0
Sport Huancayo	3–2	3–0	2–2	0–2	4–1	2–1	1–2	3–0	1–1	2–1		1–0	1–1	1–0	0–2	1–1
Unión Comercio	2–1	1–1	1–0	1–1	2–2	0–1	0–0	2–1	0–1	0–3	4–0		1–1	2–0	0–0	0–1
Universidad César Vallejo	1–0	1–0	4–3	1–0	3–1	2–2	0–0	2–0	1–0	1–0	1–1	3–1		1–0	2–1	0–1
Universidad San Martín	1–0	2–1	1–1	2–0	3–5	2–2	0–1	3–1	0–1	0–3	1–1	3–1	0–0		1–1	0–0
UTC	1–2	1–1	1–1	3–1	3–0	2–1	2–1	1–1	1–0	0–2	0–2	1–0	1–0	2–1		2–1
Universitario	1–0	0–0	3–0	1–1	5–1	1–0	4–0	0–0	0–0	3–0	2–3	1–0	1–0	2–0	0–1	

Updated to match(es) played on June 24, 2013. Source: ADFP.org.pe
Legend: Blue = home team win; Yellow = draw; Red = away team win.

== Second stage ==
The Second Stage begins in September and concludes in November. The winner of each Liguilla will qualify for the group stage of the 2014 Copa Libertadores.

=== Liguilla A ===
==== Standings ====
Pos	Team	Pld	W	D	L	GF	GA	GD	Pts	Qualification or relegation
1	Real Garcilaso	44	22	12	10	63	39	+24	77 (Note: Real Garcilaso was docked 1 point and penalized with 3 goals against.)	Third Stage and the 2014 Copa Libertadores Second Stage
2	Sporting Cristal	44	22	9	13	76	45	+31	75	
3	Alianza Lima	44	19	12	13	57	46	+11	70 (Note: Alianza Lima was awarded 1 point 2012 Torneo de Promoción y Reserva runner-up.)	
4	Universidad César Vallejo	44	18	15	11	56	46	+10	69	
5	Sport Huancayo	44	14	14	16	55	62	−7	56	
6	Melgar	44	10	20	14	45	49	−4	50	
7	Unión Comercio	44	11	11	22	39	59	−20	44	
8	Pacífico	44	10	14	20	31	62	−31	44	

Updated to match(es) played on November 2013. Source: ADFP.org.pe
Rules for classification: 1) points; 2) goal difference; 3) number of goals scored.

==== Results ====
Home \ Away	ALI	MEL	PAC	RGA	CRI	SHU	UCV	UCO
Alianza Lima		2–0	3–0	2–1	0–0	1–1	1–1	3–0
Melgar	1–1		0–0	0–0	0–0	4–4	1–1	1–1
Pacífico	1–5	1–1		2–1	0–1	1–0	1–2	1–0
Real Garcilaso	2–2	1–0	3–0		2–1	1–1	2–2	4–0
Sporting Cristal	1–0	4–1	5–0	5–2		1–0	2–0	0–1
Sport Huancayo	1–1	1–0	2–1	1–2	2–1		1–3	1–3
Universidad César Vallejo	3–0	0–2	2–0	2–0	4–2	0–0		0–0
Unión Comercio	1–2	0–2	4–1	1–1	0–2	2–0	2–1	

Updated to match(es) played on September 2013. Source: ADFP.org.pe
Legend: Blue = home team win; Yellow = draw; Red = away team win.

=== Liguilla B ===
==== Standings ====
Pos	Team	Pld	W	D	L	GF	GA	GD	Pts	Qualification or relegation
1	Universitario	44	21	13	10	59	37	+22	76	Third Stage and the 2014 Copa Libertadores Second Stage
2	UTC	44	19	11	14	54	51	+3	68	
3	Inti Gas	44	17	12	15	63	65	−2	63	
4	Juan Aurich	44	17	11	16	66	50	+16	62	
5	Cienciano	44	15	14	15	46	56	−10	59	
6	León de Huánuco	44	14	14	16	49	48	+1	56	
7	Universidad San Martín	44	12	11	21	46	60	−14	49 (Note: Universidad San Martín was awarded 2 points as 2012 Torneo de Promoción y Reserva champion.)	
8	José Gálvez	44	10	9	25	55	88	−33	39	

Updated to match(es) played on November 2013. Source: ADFP.org.pe
Rules for classification: 1) points; 2) goal difference; 3) number of goals scored.

==== Results ====
Home \ Away	CIE	IGD	JG	JA	LEÓ	USM	UTC	UNI
Cienciano		2–3	2–1	2–1	1–0	1–0	2–2	1–1
Inti Gas	2–2		1–0	2–1	1–1	3–1	2–4	3–2
José Gálvez	1–0	4–0		0–2	1–0	2–2	2–1	2–2
Juan Aurich	3–0	3–1	4–1		5–0	1–0	2–0	2–4
León de Huánuco	1–1	0–2	4–2	0–1		2–1	1–2	1–0
Universidad San Martín	0–1	3–1	3–0	2–2	1–0		4–0	0–0
UTC	1–0	1–0	1–0	1–1	1–0	3–3		1–2
Universitario	1–1	3–1	1–0	0–1	2–1	0–0	2–1	

Updated to match(es) played on November 2013. Source: ADFP.org.pe
Legend: Blue = home team win; Yellow = draw; Red = away team win.

== Play-offs ==
The Third Stage were the finals (also known as the Play-off) of the 2013 season between the winners of each group of the Second Stage. They were played in December. The group winner with the most points on the aggregate table chose which leg they played as the home team. They also chose the venue of the third match as both teams were tied on points after the second leg.

December 8, 2013
13:00
First leg

Real Garcilaso	3–2	Universitario
Ortiz 2'; Ferreira 45+1'; Ramúa 88'	Report	Ruidíaz 67' (pen.); Fernández 78'

Estadio Municipal de Espinar, Yauri
Attendance: 6,544
Referee: Manuel Garay

December 15, 2013
15:30
Second leg

Universitario	3–0	Real Garcilaso
Guastavino 7'; Fernández 16'; Guarderas 85'	Report

Estadio Monumental, Lima
Attendance: 46,824
Referee: Víctor Hugo Carrillo

December 18, 2013
13:00
Third leg

Real Garcilaso	1–1 (a.e.t.)	Universitario
Bogado 64'	Report	Galliquio 52'
Penalties
Ramúa (penalty scored); Ortiz (penalty scored); Ramos (penalty missed); Guadalupe (penalty scored); Ferreira (penalty scored); Rey (penalty missed); Retamoso (penalty missed)	4–5	(penalty missed) Ximénez; (penalty scored) Gonzáles; (penalty scored) Gómez; (penalty scored) Gustavino; (penalty scored) Ruidíaz; (penalty missed) Romero; (penalty scored) Duarte

Estadio Huancayo, Huancayo
Attendance: 15,200
Referee: Henry Gambetta

Tied 4–4 on points. Universitario won 5–4 on penalties.

== Aggregate table ==
The aggregate table will determine the four teams who qualify to the 2014 Copa Sudamericana, one team to the 2014 Copa Libertadores if necessary, and the two teams to be relegated to the Segunda División. The aggregate table consists of the points earned in the First and Second stages.

Pos	Team	Pld	W	D	L	GF	GA	GD	Pts	Qualification or relegation
1	Real Garcilaso	44	22	12	10	63	39	+24	77 (Note: Real Garcilaso was docked 1 point and penalized with 3 goals against.)	2014 Copa Libertadores Second Stage (Note: Universitario and Real Garcilaso qualified to the Copa Libertadores as winners of their respective groups in the second stage.)
2	Universitario (C)	44	21	13	10	61	39	+22	76	2014 Copa Libertadores Second Stage
3	Sporting Cristal	44	22	9	13	76	45	+31	75	2014 Copa Libertadores First Stage
4	Alianza Lima	44	19	12	13	57	46	+11	70 (Note: Alianza Lima was awarded 1 point as 2012 Torneo de Promoción y Reserva runner-up.)	2014 Copa Sudamericana First Stage
5	Universidad César Vallejo	44	18	15	11	57	46	+11	69	2014 Copa Sudamericana First Stage
6	UTC	44	19	11	14	52	49	+3	68	2014 Copa Sudamericana First Stage
7	Inti Gas	44	17	12	15	63	65	−2	63	2014 Copa Sudamericana First Stage
8	Juan Aurich	44	17	11	16	66	50	+16	62	
9	Cienciano	44	15	14	15	46	56	−10	59	
10	León de Huánuco	44	14	14	16	49	48	+1	56	
11	Sport Huancayo	44	14	14	16	55	62	−7	56	
12	Melgar	44	10	20	14	45	49	−4	50	
13	Universidad San Martín	44	12	11	21	46	60	−14	49 (Note: Universidad San Martín was awarded 2 points as 2012 Torneo de Promoción y Reserva champion.)	
14	Unión Comercio (O)	44	11	11	22	39	59	−20	44	Relegation play-off
15	Pacífico (R)	44	10	14	20	31	62	−31	44	Relegation play-off
16	José Gálvez (R)	44	10	9	25	55	88	−33	39	2014 Segunda División

Updated to match(es) played on June 24, 2013. Source: ADFP - official site
Rules for classification: 1) points; 2) goal difference; 3) number of goals scored; 4) head-to-head record
(C) Champions; (O) Play-off winners; (R) Relegated

== Relegation play-off ==
Because Pacífico and Unión Comercio tied with 44 points a relegation play-off on neutral ground will be played as the tournament rules specify.

December 4, 2013
15:00
Relegation play-off

Pacífico	0–1	Unión Comercio
	Report	Andonaire 86'

Estadio Francisco Mendoza Pizarro, Olmos
Attendance: 1,405
Referee: Miguel Santivañez

Union Comercio retained its Torneo Descentralizado spot for the 2014 season. Pacifico was relegated to the 2014 Segunda División.

== Top goalscorers ==
Top goalscorers according to the ADPF.

Player	Nationality	Club	Goals
Victor Rossel	PER	Unión Comercio	21
Raúl Ruidíaz	PER	Universitario	21
Irven Ávila	PER	Sporting Cristal	18
Germán Alemanno	ARG	Universidad César Vallejo	18
Ramón Rodríguez	PER	Cienciano	18
Roberto Ovelar	PAR	Juan Aurich	17
Sergio Ibarra	ARG	Sport Huancayo	16
Fernando Oliveira	BRA	Inti Gas	15
Luis Alberto Perea	COL	Universidad San Martín	14
Jersson Vásquez	PER	José Gálvez	14

== See also ==
- 2013 Peruvian Segunda División
- 2013 Copa Perú
- 2013 Torneo de Promoción y Reserva
