= 2013 Club Universitario de Deportes season =

Universitario de Deportes
2013 season
- Chairman: Rocío Chávez; Fernando Bravo
- Manager: Ángel Comizzo
- Stadium: Estadio Monumental
- Peruvian Primera División: Champion
Home colours	Away colours

The 2013 season was Universitario de Deportes' 89th season since its founding in 1924. The club disputed the Torneo Descentralizado, of which it was champion.

== Competitions ==
=== Overall ===
Competition	Started round	Final position / round	First match	Last match
Torneo Descentralizado	Matchday 1	Champion	15 Feb	30 Nov

=== Torneo Descentralizado ===
==== First stage ====
Pos	Team	Pld	W	D	L	GF	GA	GD	Pts	Second Stage placement
1	Real Garcilaso	30	17	7	6	40	20	+20	57	
2	Universitario	30	15	8	7	41	24	+17	53	Liguilla B
3	Sporting Cristal	30	14	7	9	51	33	+18	49	

Results

Home \ Away	ALI	CIE	MEL	IGD	JG	JA	LEÓ	PAC	RGA	CRI	SHU	UCO	UCV	USM	UTC	UNI
Alianza Lima																1–0
Cienciano																1–1
Melgar																2–2
Inti Gas																1–3
José Gálvez																1–3
Juan Aurich																1–2
León de Huánuco																2–0
Pacífico																0–1
Real Garcilaso																2–1
Sporting Cristal																4–0
Sport Huancayo																1–1
Unión Comercio																0–1
Universidad César Vallejo																0–1
Universidad San Martín																0–0
UTC																2–1
Universitario	1–0	0–0	3–0	1–1	5–1	1–0	4–0	0–0	0–0	3–0	2–3	1–0	1–0	2–0	0–1	

Updated to match(es) played on June 24, 2013. Source: ADFP.org.pe
Legend: Blue = home team win; Yellow = draw; Red = away team win.

==== Second stage ====
Liguilla B

Pos	Team	Pld	W	D	L	GF	GA	GD	Pts	Qualification or relegation
1	Universitario	44	21	13	10	59	37	+22	76	Third Stage and the 2014 Copa Libertadores Second Stage
2	UTC	44	19	11	14	54	51	+3	68	
3	Inti Gas	44	17	12	15	63	65	−2	63	

Updated to match(es) played on November 2013. Source: ADFP.org.pe
Rules for classification: 1) points; 2) goal difference; 3) number of goals scored.

Results

Home \ Away	CIE	IGD	JG	JA	LEÓ	USM	UTC	UNI
Cienciano								1–1
Inti Gas								3–2
José Gálvez								2–2
Juan Aurich								2–4
León de Huánuco								1–0
Universidad San Martín								0–0
UTC								1–2
Universitario	1–1	3–1	1–0	0–1	2–1	0–0	2–1	

Updated to match(es) played on November 2013. Source: ADFP.org.pe
Legend: Blue = home team win; Yellow = draw; Red = away team win.

==== Play-offs ====
It seemed simple, but the important victory of Real Garcilaso 3-2 over Universitario was finally laborious. Emotions to a thousand in a match where the cusqueños were more effective than the limeños in the balance of the ninety minutes in Espinar. Ortiz, Ferreyra and Ramúa scored the goals for Garcilaso while Ruidíaz and Fernández scored for the U.

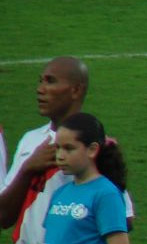
John Galliquio, player who was important in obtaining the 2013 national title.

In Lima, Universitario did what was necessary to reach the third final, the tiebreaker, in the most convincing way possible, beating Real Garcilaso 3-0 in the second leg of the Descentralizado definition. Guastavino, Fernández and Guarderas turned the Monumental stadium into a true carnival. At 6 minutes, a free kick is at Guastavino's feet, frontal, in three quarters of the field. With a notable shot, he left goalkeeper Carranza standing, and puts the difference without much urgency. Garcilaso was surprised. Then, Ruidíaz gives a pass to Fernández who, with a lot of free space ahead, lines up and beats Carranza. and finally, with 7 minutes left to finish the game, Rafael Guarderas scored the third.

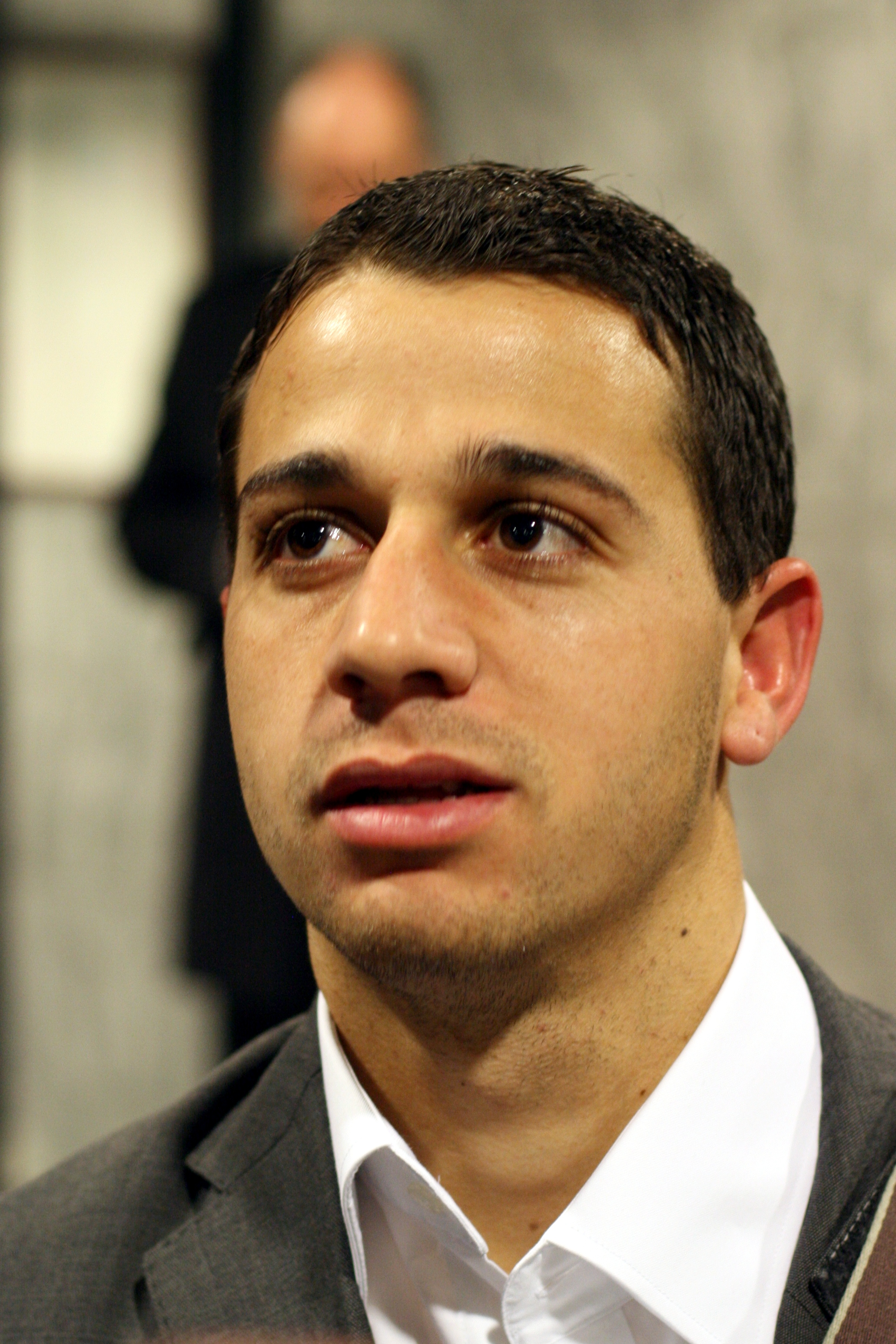
Diego Guastavino was included in the ideal team of the 2013 Torneo Descentralizado.

A tiebreaker match had to be played, this match was played in Huancayo. The U came out to play at the height of Huancayo as if it were a game on the plain. With Guastavino starting this time, unlike the game in Espinar. At 51 minutes, the U scored the first goal through John Galliquio. At minute 63, Bogado scored the tie, this result was maintained, and the champion was defined on penalties. It was Néstor Duarte who, by scoring the penalty, gave the title to Universitario de Deportes.

December 8, 2013 First leg	Real Garcilaso	3–2	Universitario	Estadio Municipal de Espinar, Yauri
13:00	Ortiz 2'; Ferreira 45+1'; Ramúa 88'	Report	Ruidíaz 67' (pen.); Fernández 78'	Attendance: 6,544; Referee: Manuel Garay

December 15, 2013 Second leg	Universitario	3–0	Real Garcilaso	Estadio Monumental, Lima
15:30	Guastavino 7'; Fernández 16'; Guarderas 85'	Report		Attendance: 46,824; Referee: Víctor Hugo Carrillo

December 18, 2013 Third leg	Real Garcilaso	1–1 (a.e.t.) (4–5 p)	Universitario	Estadio Huancayo, Huancayo
13:00	Bogado 64'	Report	Galliquio 52'	Attendance: 15,200; Referee: Henry Gambetta
	Penalties
	Ramúa (penalty scored); Ortiz (penalty scored); Ramos (penalty missed); Guadalupe (penalty scored); Ferreira (penalty scored); Rey (penalty missed); Retamoso (penalty missed)		(penalty missed) Ximénez; (penalty scored) Gonzáles; (penalty scored) Gómez; (penalty scored) Gustavino; (penalty scored) Ruidíaz; (penalty missed) Romero; (penalty scored) Duarte

Universitario won the cup after defeating Real Garcilaso.
