= 2013 FBC Melgar season =

FBC Melgar
2013 season
- Stadium: Estadio Monumental Virgen de Chapi
- Torneo Descentralizado: Primera Etapa: Eleventh (11°); Segunda Etapa: Sixth (6°); Aggregate Table: Twelfth (12°); Twelfth National (12°)
- Copa Sudamericana: First Stage
Home colours	Away colours	Third colours

The 2013 FBC Melgar season were the Ninety-Nineth (99.º) of the club from its foundation in 1915, Forty-Four (44) participations in the top-flight of Peruvian Primera División (of 97 Editions) with denomination Torneo Descentralizado. In Previous Season the club qualified as 5th Place of the 2012 Torneo Descentralizado.

Melgar were a of sixteen (16) clubs in the Forty-Eighth edition (48.º) Torneo Descentralizado, the competition most important of the Peruvian football. The club played the Peruvian Primera División and Copa Sudamericana for First (1st) Time.

== Torneo Descentralizado ==
=== Primera etapa ===
Pos	Team	Pld	W	D	L	GF	GA	GD	Pts
10	Cienciano	30	10	9	11	30	39	-9	39
11	FBC Melgar	30	8	12	10	32	33	-1	36
12	Juan Aurich	30	8	9	13	37	37	0	33

== See also ==
- FBC Melgar
- 2013 Torneo Descentralizado
