= Clásico Moderno =

Clásico Moderno (lit. Modern classic) is a Spanish term used in some Latin American countries to refer to a sports rivalry.

- Clásico Moderno (Honduras) - A rivalry between C.D. Olimpia and Real C.D. España.
- Clásico Moderno (Peru) - A rivalry between Sporting Cristal and Universitario.
