= 2018 Club Universitario de Deportes season =

Universitario de Deportes
2018 season
- Manager: Pedro Troglio; Nicolas Cordova
- Stadium: Estadio Monumental "U"
- Peruvian Primera División: 9th
- Copa Libertadores: First stage
- Average home league attendance: 10,805 (A) 16,990 (C)
| Home colours | Away colours |

The 2018 season was Universitario de Deportes' 94th season since its founding in 1924. The club played the Torneo Descentralizado and the Copa Libertadores.

== Competitions ==
=== Descentralizado ===
==== Torneo de Verano ====
| Pos | Team | Pld | W | D | L | GF | GA | GD | Pts | Qualification | CRI | SRO | UTC | USM | ALI | COM | AYA | UNI |
|---|---|---|---|---|---|---|---|---|---|---|---|---|---|---|---|---|---|---|
| 1 | Sporting Cristal | 14 | 10 | 3 | 1 | 42 | 15 | +27 | 33 | Advance to Finals | — | — | — | — | — | — | — | 1–1 |
| 2 | Sport Rosario | 14 | 6 | 2 | 6 | 23 | 21 | +2 | 20 | | — | — | — | — | — | — | — | 1–1 |
| 3 | UTC | 14 | 5 | 5 | 4 | 14 | 19 | −5 | 20 | | — | — | — | — | — | — | — | 0–0 |
| 4 | Universidad San Martín | 14 | 4 | 7 | 3 | 20 | 18 | +2 | 19 | | — | — | — | — | — | — | — | 1–1 |
| 5 | Alianza Lima | 14 | 5 | 4 | 5 | 16 | 17 | −1 | 19 | | — | — | — | — | — | — | — | 2–0 |
| 6 | Comerciantes Unidos | 14 | 4 | 2 | 8 | 18 | 26 | −8 | 14 | | — | — | — | — | — | — | — | 0–2 |
| 7 | Ayacucho | 14 | 4 | 2 | 8 | 22 | 34 | −12 | 14 | | — | — | — | — | — | — | — | 4–2 |
| 8 | Universitario | 14 | 2 | 7 | 5 | 16 | 21 | −5 | 13 | | 3–3 | 1–2 | 0–1 | 2–2 | 1–3 | 1–0 | 1–1 | — |

Source: ADFP, Soccerway
Legend: Blue = home team win; Yellow = draw; Red = away team win.
Rules for classification: 1) Points; 2) Goal difference; 3) Goals for; 4) Drawing of lots.

==== Apertura ====
| Pos | Team | Pld | W | D | L | GF | GA | GD | Pts |
|---|---|---|---|---|---|---|---|---|---|
| 10 | Sport Huancayo | 15 | 4 | 6 | 5 | 16 | 15 | +1 | 18 |
| 11 | Universitario | 15 | 4 | 6 | 5 | 18 | 21 | −3 | 18 |
| 12 | Sport Rosario | 15 | 6 | 3 | 6 | 21 | 24 | −3 | 17 |

Results

| Home \ Away | ALI | AYA | BIN | CAN | COM | MUN | MEL | RGA | SBA | SHU | SRO | CRI | UCO | USM | UNI | UTC |
|---|---|---|---|---|---|---|---|---|---|---|---|---|---|---|---|---|
| Alianza Lima | — | — | — | — | — | — | — | — | — | — | — | — | — | — | — | — |
| Ayacucho | — | — | — | — | — | — | — | — | — | — | — | — | — | — | — | — |
| Binacional | — | — | — | — | — | — | — | — | — | — | — | — | — | — | — | — |
| Cantolao | — | — | — | — | — | — | — | — | — | — | — | — | — | — | — | — |
| Comerciantes Unidos | — | — | — | — | — | — | — | — | — | — | — | — | — | — | 3–4 | — |
| Deportivo Municipal | — | — | — | — | — | — | — | — | — | — | — | — | — | — | 0–2 | — |
| Melgar | — | — | — | — | — | — | — | — | — | — | — | — | — | — | — | — |
| Real Garcilaso | — | — | — | — | — | — | — | — | — | — | — | — | — | — | — | — |
| Sport Boys | — | — | — | — | — | — | — | — | — | — | — | — | — | — | — | — |
| Sport Huancayo | — | — | — | — | — | — | — | — | — | — | — | — | — | — | 2–1 | — |
| Sport Rosario | — | — | — | — | — | — | — | — | — | — | — | — | — | — | 3–0 | — |
| Sporting Cristal | — | — | — | — | — | — | — | — | — | — | — | — | — | — | 1–0 | — |
| Unión Comercio | — | — | — | — | — | — | — | — | — | — | — | — | — | — | 2–0 | — |
| Universidad San Martín | — | — | — | — | — | — | — | — | — | — | — | — | — | — | 2–2 | — |
| Universitario | 1–1 | 1–1 | 1–0 | 2–2 | — | — | 1–1 | 0–1 | 2–1 | — | — | — | — | — | — | — |
| UTC | — | — | — | — | — | — | — | — | — | — | — | — | — | — | 1–1 | — |

Source: ADFP, Soccerway
Legend: Blue = home team win; Yellow = draw; Red = away team win.

==== Clausura ====
| Pos | Team | Pld | W | D | L | GF | GA | GD | Pts |
|---|---|---|---|---|---|---|---|---|---|
| 3 | Ayacucho | 15 | 7 | 5 | 3 | 30 | 25 | +5 | 26 |
| 4 | Universitario | 15 | 8 | 2 | 5 | 20 | 17 | +3 | 26 |
| 5 | Sporting Cristal | 15 | 7 | 3 | 5 | 37 | 14 | +23 | 24 |

Results

| Home \ Away | ALI | AYA | BIN | CAN | COM | MUN | MEL | RGA | SBA | SHU | SRO | CRI | UCO | USM | UNI | UTC |
|---|---|---|---|---|---|---|---|---|---|---|---|---|---|---|---|---|
| Alianza Lima | — | — | — | — | — | — | — | — | — | — | — | — | — | — | 2–1 | — |
| Ayacucho | — | — | — | — | — | — | — | — | — | — | — | — | — | — | 4–2 | — |
| Binacional | — | — | — | — | — | — | — | — | — | — | — | — | — | — | 0–1 | — |
| Cantolao | — | — | — | — | — | — | — | — | — | — | — | — | — | — | 2–0 | — |
| Comerciantes Unidos | — | — | — | — | — | — | — | — | — | — | — | — | — | — | — | — |
| Deportivo Municipal | — | — | — | — | — | — | — | — | — | — | — | — | — | — | — | — |
| Melgar | — | — | — | — | — | — | — | — | — | — | — | — | — | — | 2–1 | — |
| Real Garcilaso | — | — | — | — | — | — | — | — | — | — | — | — | — | — | 0–1 | — |
| Sport Boys | — | — | — | — | — | — | — | — | — | — | — | — | — | — | 0–0 | — |
| Sport Huancayo | — | — | — | — | — | — | — | — | — | — | — | — | — | — | — | — |
| Sport Rosario | — | — | — | — | — | — | — | — | — | — | — | — | — | — | — | — |
| Sporting Cristal | — | — | — | — | — | — | — | — | — | — | — | — | — | — | — | — |
| Unión Comercio | — | — | — | — | — | — | — | — | — | — | — | — | — | — | — | — |
| Universidad San Martín | — | — | — | — | — | — | — | — | — | — | — | — | — | — | — | — |
| Universitario | — | — | — | — | 2–0 | 1–2 | — | — | — | 1–0 | 2–0 | 2–1 | 2–1 | 2–2 | — | 2–1 |
| UTC | — | — | — | — | — | — | — | — | — | — | — | — | — | — | — | — |

Source: ADFP, Soccerway
Legend: Blue = home team win; Yellow = draw; Red = away team win.

=== Copa Libertadores ===
==== First stage ====
In the first leg of the first phase, Oriente Petrolero beat Universitario 2–0 at home.

| 22 January 2018 | Oriente Petrolero (Bolivia) | 2–0 | (Peru) Universitario | Estadio Ramón Tahuichi Aguilera, Santa Cruz de la Sierra |
| 21:15 UTC−4 | Sánchez 27'; Freitas 79' | Report | | Attendance: 21,500; Referee: Carlos Orbe (Ecuador) |

Universitario beat Oriente Petrolero 3–1 at the Monumental with goals from Corzo at 7' and 61' and Chávez at 67'. Paredes scored the Bolivian goal in the final minutes when Oriente was playing with nine men. The Bolivians qualify for the next phase of Libertadores.

| 26 January 2018 | Universitario (Peru) | 3–1 | (Bolivia) Oriente Petrolero | Estadio Monumental "U", Lima |
| 20:45 UTC−5 | Corzo 7', 60'; Chávez 65' | Report | Paredes 84' | Attendance: 17,000; Referee: Esteban Ostojich (Uruguay) |
