= 2012 FBC Melgar season =

FBC Melgar
2012 season
- Stadium: Estadio Monumental Virgen de Chapi
- Torneo Descentralizado: Primera Etapa: Eighth (8°); Segunda Etapa: Fourth (4°); Aggregate Table: Fifth (5°); Fifth National (5°)
Home colours	Away colours	Third colours

The 2012 FBC Melgar season were the Ninety-Eighth (98.º) of the club from its foundation in 1915, Forty-Three (43) participations in the top-flight of Peruvian Primera División (of 96 Editions) with denomination Torneo Descentralizado. In Previous Season the club qualified as 12th Place of the 2011 Torneo Descentralizado.

Melgar were a of sixteen (16) clubs in the Forty-Seventh edition (47.º) Torneo Descentralizado, the competition most important of the Peruvian football. The club played the Peruvian Primera División.

== Torneo Descentralizado ==
=== Primera etapa ===
Pos	Team	Pld	W	D	L	GF	GA	GD	Pts
7	Universitario^{1}	30	11	10	9	40	37	+3	42
8	FBC Melgar	30	11	8	11	35	34	+1	41
9	León de Huánuco	30	10	10	10	42	32	+10	40

== See also ==
- FBC Melgar
- 2012 Torneo Descentralizado
