= 2012 Torneo Descentralizado =

Torneo Descentralizado
- Season: 2012
- Dates: 18 February 2012 – 9 December 2012
- Champions: Sporting Cristal; 16th Primera División title
- Relegated: Sport Boys; Cobresol
- Copa Libertadores: Sporting Cristal; Real Garcilaso; Universidad César Vallejo
- Copa Sudamericana: Juan Aurich; Melgar; Sport Huancayo; Inti Gas
- Matches: 354
- Top goalscorer: Andy Pando (27 goals)
- Biggest home win: León de Huánuco 7–1 Unión Comercio; Sporting Cristal 6–0 Cobresol
- Biggest away win: Sport Boys 0–5 Sporting Cristal

The 2012 Torneo Descentralizado de Fútbol Profesional (known as the 2012 Copa Movistar for sponsorship reasons) is the ninety-sixth season of Association Peruvian football. A total of 16 teams competed in the tournament, with Juan Aurich as the defending champion. The Torneo Descentralizado began on February 19 and ended on December 9, 2012.

== Competition modus ==
The season was divided into 3 stages. In the first stage 16 teams play a round-robin home-and-away round for a total of 30 matches each. In the second stage the 16 teams were divided into 2 groups. In addition, the team ranked first at the end of the first stage was eligible to play the 2013 Copa Libertadores as Peru 3. Each team carried their records from the first stage into the second stage. Both groups played another round-robin home-and-away round for 14 matches. Bonus points were awarded to two teams based on the performance of their reserve teams in the 2012 Torneo de Promoción y Reserva before the first match of the second stage. The teams ranked first in each group at the end of the 14 matches advanced to the third stage. The two teams with the fewest points at the end of the second stage were relegated. In the third stage the championship was contested in a two-legged Play-off. The Play-off finalists qualified for the Copa Libertadores. The remaining international competition berths were determined by the season aggregate table.

== Teams ==
On 20 February 2012, Universidad San Martín, in protest of the ongoing players' strike, announced its definitive withdrawal from the tournament, the ADFP, and professional football. It also announced it would be closing its football club. On 14 March 2012, Universidad San Martín returned to the tournament and professional football.

=== Team changes ===
Promoted from 2011 Segunda División	Promoted from 2011 Copa Perú	Relegated from 2011 Primera División
▲ José Gálvez (1st)	▲ Real Garcilaso (1st)	▼ Alianza Atlético (15th) ▼CNI (16th)

=== Stadia locations ===
Locations of the 2012 Primera División teams

Team	City	Stadium	Capacity
Alianza Lima	Lima	Alejandro Villanueva	35,000
Cienciano	Cusco	Garcilaso	40,000
Cobresol	Moquegua	25 de Noviembre	25,000
Inti Gas	Ayacucho	Ciudad de Cumaná	15,000
José Gálvez	Chimbote	Manuel Rivera Sánchez	25,000
Juan Aurich	Chiclayo	Elías Aguirre	24,500
León de Huánuco	Huánuco	Heraclio Tapia	15,000
Melgar	Arequipa	Virgen de Chapi	40,217
Real Garcilaso	Cusco	Garcilaso	40,000
Sport Boys	Callao	Miguel Grau	17,000
Sport Huancayo	Huancayo	Estadio Huancayo	20,000
Sporting Cristal	Lima	Alberto Gallardo	18,000
Unión Comercio	Nueva Cajamarca	IPD de Moyobamba	5,000
Universidad César Vallejo	Trujillo	Mansiche	25,000
Universidad San Martín	Lima	Alberto Gallardo	18,000
Universitario	Lima	Monumental	80,093

=== Personnel and kits ===
Note: Flags indicate national team as has been defined under FIFA eligibility rules. Players may hold more than one non-FIFA nationality.

Team	Manager	Captain	Kit manufacturer	Shirt sponsor
Alianza Lima	(Peru) José Soto	(Peru) Juan Jayo	Nike	
Cienciano	(Mexico) Raul Arias	(Peru) Julio Garcia	Aries	Movistar
Cobresol	(Peru) Octavio Vidales	(Peru) Gregorio Bernales	Loma's	Universidad Alas Peruanas
Inti Gas	(Colombia) Edgar Ospina	(Peru) Nick Montalva	Walon	Inti Gas
José Gálvez	(Peru) Javier Arce	(Peru) Marco Ruiz	Real	SIDERPERU/Megaplaza
Juan Aurich	(Peru) Franco Navarro^{2}	(Peru) Luis Guadalupe	Walon	Grupo Oviedo
León de Huánuco	(Peru) Jean Ferrari	(Peru) Carlos Zegarra	Walon	Roky's
Melgar	(Argentina) Julio Zamora	(Peru) Antonio Meza Cuadra	Marathon	
Real Garcilaso	(Peru) Freddy García	(Peru) Ramón Rodríguez	Walon	I-RUN
Sport Boys	(Peru) Jorge Espejo	(Peru) Jorge Huamán	Triathlon	Gobierno Regional del Callao
Sport Huancayo	(Peru) Wilmar Valencia^{1}	(Argentina) Sergio Ibarra	Manchete	Caja Municipal de Huancayo
Sporting Cristal	(Peru) Roberto Mosquera	(Peru) Erick Delgado	Umbro	Cerveza Cristal/Volkswagen
Unión Comercio	(Uruguay) Mario Viera	(Paraguay) Héctor Sosa	Real	New Holland
Universidad César Vallejo	(Peru) Víctor Rivera	(Argentina) Carlos Galván	Walon	Universidad César Vallejo
Universidad San Martín	(Argentina) Angel Cappa	(Peru) Leao Butrón	Umbro	Herbalife
Universitario	(Peru) Nolberto Solano	(Peru) John Galliquio	Umbro	Radio Exitosa

- ^{1} Cristian Arrasada acted as interem manager until Wilmar Valencia was eligible to manage when the Liguillas began.
- ^{2} Juan Chumpitaz acted as interem manager until Franco Navarro was eligible to manage when the Liguillas began.

=== Managerial changes ===
Team	Outgoing manager	Manner of departure	Date of vacancy	Table	Incoming manager	Date of appointment
Pre-season changes
Melgar	Wilmar Valencia	End of contract	December 2011	N/A	Julio Zamora	December 2011
León de Huánuco	Franco Navarro	End of contract	December 2011	N/A	Aníbal Ruiz	December 2011
Sport Huancayo	Roberto Mosquera	End of contract	December 2011	N/A	Miguel Company	December 2011
Sporting Cristal	Francisco Melgar (interim)	End of contract	December 2011	N/A	Roberto Mosquera	December 2011
Universidad San Martín	Aníbal Ruiz	End of contract	December 2011	N/A	Franco Navarro	December 2011
First Stage changes
José Gálvez	Wilmar Valencia	Resigned	24 March 2012	5th	Javier Arce (interim)	28 March 2012
Cienciano	Carlos Jurado	Sacked	17 April 2012	10th	Raul Arias	18 April 2012
Sport Huancayo	Miguel Company	Resigned	18 April 2012	6th	Jorge Machuca (interim)	24 April 2012
Unión Comercio	Julio César Uribe	Resigned	22 April 2012	10th	Mario Viera	30 April 2012
Cobresol	Teddy Cardama	Sacked	30 April 2012	16th	Javier Chirinos	7 May 2012
Universitario	José del Solar	Resigned	26 May 2012	14th	Nolberto Solano	June 2012
Sport Huancayo	Jorge Machuca	End of contract	June 2012	11th	Wilmar Valencia	June 2012
Universidad San Martín	Franco Navarro	Resigned	24 June 2012	10th	Orlando Lavalle (interim)	25 June 2012
Sport Boys	Claudio Techera	Resigned	1 July 2012	15th	Julio Colina (interim)	3 July 2012
Universidad San Martín	Orlando Lavalle (interim)	Resigned	13 July 2012	12th	Angel Cappa	13 July 2012
Juan Aurich	Diego Umaña	Resigned	13 July 2012	6th	Franco Navarro	14 July 2012
Cobresol	Javier Chirinos	Resigned	30 July 2012	16th	Germán Pinillos	31 July 2012
Second Stage changes
León de Huánuco	Aníbal Ruiz	Resigned	15 August 2012	9th	Jean Ferrari	16 August 2012
Cobresol	Germán Pinillos	Resigned	13 September 2012	16th	Octavio Vidales	14 September 2012
Sport Boys	Julio Colina (interim)	Resigned	20 September 2012	15th	Jorge Espejo	20 September 2012

== First stage ==
=== Standings ===
Pos	Team	Pld	W	D	L	GF	GA	GD	Pts	Second Stage placement
1	Sporting Cristal	30	17	7	6	62	30	+32	58 (Note: Sporting Cristal as first stage winners can choose to enter the Copa Libertadores in the First Stage or the Second Stage if they advance to the play-off.)	Liguilla A
2	Real Garcilaso	30	16	9	5	38	21	+17	57	Liguilla B
3	Universidad César Vallejo	30	16	7	7	44	27	+17	55	Liguilla B
4	Inti Gas	30	13	6	11	32	29	+3	45	Liguilla A
5	Juan Aurich	30	13	6	11	37	39	−2	45	Liguilla B
6	José Gálvez	30	12	9	9	30	34	−4	45	Liguilla A
7	Universitario	30	11	10	9	40	37	+3	42 (Note: Universitario was docked 1 point for outstanding debts with former assistant manager Carlos Trejos.)	Liguilla A
8	Melgar	30	11	8	11	35	34	+1	41	Liguilla B
9	León de Huánuco	30	10	10	10	42	32	+10	40	Liguilla B
10	Sport Huancayo	30	11	7	12	34	38	−4	40	Liguilla A
11	Universidad San Martín	30	10	8	12	33	38	−5	38	Liguilla A
12	Unión Comercio	30	11	5	14	37	43	−6	38	Liguilla B
13	Alianza Lima	30	9	11	10	31	36	−5	34 (Note: Alianza Lima was docked a total of 4 points for failing to pay their players' wages in January (2 points) and February (2 points).)	Liguilla B
14	Cienciano	30	10	4	16	37	46	−9	34	Liguilla A
15	Sport Boys	30	5	11	14	25	40	−15	26	Liguilla B
16	Cobresol	30	3	6	21	22	56	−34	11 (Note: Cobresol was docked 4 points for an outstanding debt with the players' union SAFAP.)	Liguilla A

Updated to match(es) played on 29 July 2012. Source: ADFP - official site
Rules for classification: 1) points; 2) goal difference; 3) number of goals scored; 4) head-to-head record

=== Results ===
Home \ Away	ALI	CIE	COB	MEL	IGD	JG	JA	LEÓ	RGA	SBA	CRI	SHU	UCO	UCV	USM	UNI
Alianza Lima		2–1	2–2	0–0	1–1	0–0	0–3	2–2	2–0	2–1	1–1	3–1	3–2	2–0	1–1	1–0
Cienciano	3–2		4–0	2–0	1–2	3–1	0–1	2–3	2–0	2–1	2–1	2–2	0–0	2–0	2–0	2–3
Cobresol	1–0	0–2		0–2	1–2	1–1	2–2	1–1	1–1	0–1	1–0	0–2	0–3	0–2	1–2	1–1
Melgar	3–0	3–0	2–1		1–0	2–1	1–1	1–0	0–0	1–1	1–2	1–0	3–0	0–2	3–0 (Note: Match not played. FBC Melgar awarded 3–0 victory.)	3–1
Inti Gas	3–0	1–0	2–1	2–1		1–0	2–0	1–0	2–2	4–1	2–1	0–0	0–0	0–2	2–1	1–0
José Gálvez	0–2	2–0	2–1	0–0	1–0		3–1	1–0	2–2	1–1	0–2	1–0	2–1	0–1	1–1	1–1
Juan Aurich	1–0	3–0	1–2	3–1	2–1	1–2		1–0	0–0	2–1	1–0	3–0	2–2	2–1	0–0	1–0
León de Huánuco	0–0	4–1	3–0	1–1	1–0	0–0	3–2		2–2	2–0	2–3	1–0	7–1	1–1	2–2	0–0
Real Garcilaso	2–1	1–0	2–0	2–0	1–0	3–0	1–0	1–0		1–1	3–0	2–0	1–0	1–0	3–0	2–1
Sport Boys	0–1	1–1	1–0	1–1	0–0	0–1	0–1	0–0	0–0		0–5	2–0	0–1	3–0	0–1	1–1
Sporting Cristal	1–1	4–0	2–1	3–1	2–0	4–0	5–1	1–0	3–0	3–1		2–2	2–0	2–2	4–1	1–1
Sport Huancayo	3–1	2–0	3–0	1–0	2–2	0–1	1–0	2–1	0–2	1–2	1–1		2–1	2–0	2–1	1–1
Unión Comercio	0–0	2–0	2–1	3–2	1–0	0–3	3–0	2–3	0–1	2–1	1–1	2–0		0–1	2–0	2–3
Universidad César Vallejo	2–0	1–0	3–1	4–1	1–0	4–0	0–0	2–1	2–1	2–2	2–3	1–1	3–1		2–0	2–0
Universidad San Martín	0–0	3–2	2–0	0–0	2–0	2–3	5–1	0–1	0–0	3–1	2–1	1–2	1–0	0–0		0–1
Universitario	2–1	1–1	3–2	3–0	3–1	0–0	3–1	2–1	2–1	1–1	0–2	3–1	1–3	1–1	1–2	

Updated to match(es) played on 2012. Source: ADFP.org.pe
Legend: Blue = home team win; Yellow = draw; Red = away team win.

== Second stage ==
The Second Stage begins on 18 August and concludes 25 November. The winner of each Liguilla will qualify for the group stage of the 2013 Copa Libertadores.

=== Liguilla A ===
==== Standings ====
Pos	Team	Pld	W	D	L	GF	GA	GD	Pts	Qualification or relegation
1	Sporting Cristal	44	25	11	8	93	44	+49	86	Third Stage and the 2013 Copa Libertadores Second Stage
2	Sport Huancayo	44	18	9	17	52	51	+1	63	
3	Inti Gas	44	17	11	16	43	45	−2	62	
4	Universidad San Martín	44	16	12	16	49	52	−3	61 (Note: Universidad San Martín obtained 1 point as 2012 Torneo de Promoción y Reserva runner-up.)	
5	José Gálvez	44	17	10	17	48	54	−6	61	
6	Cienciano	44	16	9	19	58	59	−1	57	
7	Universitario	44	15	13	16	52	58	−6	57 (Note: Universitario was docked 1 point for outstanding debts with former assistant manager Carlos Trejos.)	
8	Cobresol	44	6	8	30	33	82	−49	22 (Note: Cobresol was docked 4 points for an outstanding debt with the players' union SAFAP.)	

Updated to match(es) played on 18 November 2012. Source: ADFP.org.pe
Rules for classification: 1) points; 2) goal difference; 3) number of goals scored.

==== Results ====
Home \ Away	CIE	COB	IGD	JG	CRI	SHU	USM	UNI
Cienciano		2–0	0–0	2–0	1–2	1–1	2–2	3–0
Cobresol	1–2		0–0	1–0	0–2	4–0	1–2	3–0
Inti Gas	0–1	2–0		2–1	1–1	1–3	1–0	1–0
José Gálvez	0–3	4–0	3–1		3–1	0–1	1–2	4–0
Sporting Cristal	3–3	6–0	4–0	2–0		1–0	3–1	1–1
Sport Huancayo	2–0	1–1	2–1	2–0	3–1		0–1	3–0
Universidad San Martín	1–0	1–0	1–1	1–1	1–1	2–0		0–1
Universitario	1–1	4–0	0–0	3–0	0–3	0–1	2–1	

Updated to match(es) played on 27 October 2012. Source: ADFP.org.pe
Legend: Blue = home team win; Yellow = draw; Red = away team win.

=== Liguilla B ===
==== Standings ====
Pos	Team	Pld	W	D	L	GF	GA	GD	Pts	Qualification or relegation
1	Real Garcilaso	44	24	10	10	63	35	+28	82	Third Stage and the 2013 Copa Libertadores Second Stage
2	Universidad César Vallejo	44	21	11	12	57	44	+13	74	
3	Juan Aurich	44	20	9	15	56	54	+2	71 (Note: Juan Aurich obtained 2 points as 2012 Torneo de Promoción y Reserva champion.)	
4	Melgar	44	18	12	14	56	44	+12	66	
5	Unión Comercio	44	16	9	19	51	61	−10	57	
6	León de Huánuco	44	13	15	16	54	47	+7	54	
7	Alianza Lima	44	14	15	15	50	51	−1	53 (Note: Alianza Lima was docked a total of 4 points for failing to pay their players' wages in January (2 points) and February (2 points).)	
8	Sport Boys	44	6	16	22	36	70	−34	32 (Note: Sport Boys was docked 2 points for an outstanding debt with the players' union SAFAP.)	

Updated to match(es) played on 18 November 2012. Source: ADFP.org.pe
Rules for classification: 1) points; 2) goal difference; 3) number of goals scored.

==== Results ====
Home \ Away	ALI	MEL	JA	LEÓ	RGA	SBA	UCO	UCV
Alianza Lima		0–0	2–1	1–2	2–0	4–0	1–1	2–2
Melgar	2–0		1–0	2–0	1–0	5–1	3–0	4–0
Juan Aurich	1–0	2–0		1–1	3–2	1–1	2–1	3–1
León de Huánuco	1–2	1–1	0–0		0–2	3–0	0–0	2–0
Real Garcilaso	3–0	3–0	3–1	2–1		3–0	3–0	1–1
Sport Boys	0–4	1–1	1–2	1–1	3–1		1–1	1–1
Unión Comercio	2–1	1–1	1–0	2–0	2–1	2–1		1–2
Universidad César Vallejo	0–0	1–0	1–2	1–0	0–1	1–0	2–0	

Updated to match(es) played on 20 October 2012. Source: ADFP.org.pe
Legend: Blue = home team win; Yellow = draw; Red = away team win.

== Play-offs ==
The Third Stage will be the finals (also known as the Play-off) of the 2012 season between the winners of each group of the Second Stage. They will be played in December. The group winner with the most points on the aggregate table chooses which leg they will play as the home team. They will also choose the venue of the third match in case both teams are tied on points after the second leg.

December 2, 2012
13:00
First leg

Real Garcilaso	0 – 1	Sporting Cristal
		Ross 33'

Estadio Garcilaso
Referee: Victor Hugo Rivera

December 9, 2012
15:00
Second leg

Sporting Cristal	1 – 0	Real Garcilaso
Ross 24'

Estadio Nacional
Referee: Victor Hugo Carrillo

== Aggregate table ==
The aggregate table will determine the four teams who qualify to the 2013 Copa Sudamericana, one team to the 2013 Copa Libertadores if necessary, and the two teams to be relegated to the Segunda División. The aggregate table consists of the points earned in the First and Second stages.

Pos	Team	Pld	W	D	L	GF	GA	GD	Pts	Qualification or relegation
1	Sporting Cristal (C)	44	25	11	8	93	44	+49	86	2013 Copa Libertadores Second Stage (Note: Sporting Cristal and Real Garcilaso are qualified for the 2013 Copa Libertadores as the winners of the Second Stage Liguillas.)
2	Real Garcilaso	44	24	10	10	63	35	+28	82	2013 Copa Libertadores Second Stage
3	Universidad César Vallejo	44	21	11	12	57	44	+13	74	2013 Copa Libertadores First Stage
4	Juan Aurich	44	20	9	15	56	54	+2	71 (Note: Juan Aurich obtained 2 points as 2012 Torneo de Promoción y Reserva champion.)	2013 Copa Sudamericana First Stage
5	Melgar	44	18	12	14	56	44	+12	66	2013 Copa Sudamericana First Stage
6	Sport Huancayo	44	18	9	17	52	51	+1	63	2013 Copa Sudamericana First Stage
7	Inti Gas	44	17	11	16	43	45	−2	62	2013 Copa Sudamericana First Stage
8	Universidad San Martín	44	16	12	16	49	52	−3	61 (Note: Universidad San Martín obtained 1 point as 2012 Torneo de Promoción y Reserva runner-up.)	
9	José Gálvez	44	17	10	17	48	54	−6	61	
10	Cienciano	44	16	9	19	58	59	−1	57	
11	Universitario	44	15	13	16	52	58	−6	57 (Note: Universitario was docked 1 point for outstanding debts with former assistant manager Carlos Trejos.)	
12	Unión Comercio	44	16	9	19	51	61	−10	57	
13	León de Huánuco	44	13	15	16	54	47	+7	54	
14	Alianza Lima	44	14	15	15	50	51	−1	53 (Note: Alianza Lima was docked a total of 4 points for failing to pay their players' wages in January (2 points) and February (2 points).)	
15	Sport Boys (R)	44	6	16	22	36	70	−34	32 (Note: Sport Boys was docked 2 points for an outstanding debt with the players' union SAFAP.)	2013 Segunda División
16	Cobresol (R)	44	6	8	30	33	82	−49	22 (Note: Cobresol was docked 4 points for an outstanding debt with the players' union SAFAP.)	2013 Segunda División

Updated to match(es) played on 29 July 2012. Source: ADFP - official site
Rules for classification: 1) points; 2) goal difference; 3) number of goals scored; 4) head-to-head record
(C) Champions; (R) Relegated

== Top goalscorers ==
Rank	Player	Club	Goals
1	(Peru) Andy Pando	Real Garcilaso	27
2	(Uruguay) Miguel Ximénez	Universitario	20
3	(Peru) Roberto Jiménez	Universidad César Vallejo	18
4	(Peru) Hernán Rengifo	Sporting Cristal	16
4	(Peru) Carlos Orejuela	Sport Boys	16
4	(Peru) Junior Ross	Sporting Cristal	17
5	(Panama) Luis Tejada	Juan Aurich	15
5	(Peru) Irven Ávila	Sporting Cristal	15

- Source: Soccerway
- Last updated: To games played in Round 43

== See also ==
- 2012 Peruvian Segunda División
- 2012 Copa Perú
- 2012 Torneo de Promoción y Reserva
