= Roncero =

Roncero may refer to:

- Braulio Roncero (1951–2018), Spanish-born Dutch professional darts player
- Fabián Roncero (born 1970), Spanish athlete
- Paco Roncero (born 1969), Spanish chef
- Ricardo Ronceros (born 1977), Peruvian footballer
- Rodrigo Roncero (born 1977), Argentine rugby player
