= 2011 UEFA Regions' Cup qualification squads (Spain) =

The following is a list of squads for each region competing in the 2011 UEFA Regions' Cup qualifiers.

== Group A ==
=== Andalucia ===
Head coaches: Miguel Morilla Cabeza and Julián Roales Teba

| No. | Pos. | Player | Date of birth (age) | Caps | Goals | Club |
|---|---|---|---|---|---|---|
| 1 | GK | Francisco Manuel Bacas Pulido | | | | Motril CF |
| 2 | DF | Eduardo Chía Merino | | | | CD Mairena |
| 3 | DF | Jaime Otón De La Haza | | | | UD Los Palacios |
| 4 | DF | Jorge Mariano Pulido Barneto | | | | CD Alcalá |
| 5 | DF | Miguel Ángel Hermoso Herrera - Mere | | | | |
| 6 | MF | Francisco Javier Bea López | | | | |
| 7 | MF | José Antonio Muñoz García | | | | |
| 8 | MF | Ángel Luis Catalina Hernández | | | | |
| 9 | FW | Pedro José Carrión Padial | | | | |
| 10 | MF | Daniel Venegas Ortiz | | | | |
| 11 | MF | Francisco Javier Fernández Luque | | | | |
| 12 | DF | Alejo Núñez Rodríguez | | | | |
| 13 | GK | José Miguel Márquez González | | | | CD Mairena |
| 14 | MF | Francisco Hernández Carrasco | | | | |
| 15 | FW | Juan Pablo Pereira Sastre | | | | |
| 16 | FW | Tunde Enahoro | | | | |
| 17 | FW | José Antonio Lancho Alonso | | | | |
| 18 | FW | Jorge Bayón Blanco | | | | |

=== Cantabria ===
Head coach: Manuel Costales

| No. | Pos. | Player | Date of birth (age) | Caps | Goals | Club |
|---|---|---|---|---|---|---|
| | | Eloy García Llamazares | | | | SD Barreda Balompié |
| | | Miguel Ángel Matían Martín | | | | CD Bezana |
| | | Sergio Hernández García | | | | CD Bezana |
| | | Carlos Ruiz Hertlez | | | | CD Bezana |
| | | Felipe Pandal del Prado | | | | CD Bezana |
| | | José Manuel Salas Ortega | | | | SD Rayo Cantabria |
| | | Ricardo Costales Álvarez | | | | SD Rayo Cantabria |
| | | Sergio Domínguez Carral | | | | SD Rayo Cantabria |
| | | Alberto Toca Ugarte | | | | SD Rayo Cantabria |
| | | Javier Prada Pontones | | | | SD Rayo Cantabria |
| | | Pablo Sánchez Martínez | | | | SD Rayo Cantabria |
| | | Víctor Rodríguez Marcos | | | | SD Textil Escudo |
| | | Alejandro González Marañón | | | | CF Ribamontán al Mar |
| | | César Gutiérrez Fernández | | | | UM Escobedo |
| | | Carlos Liaño Nodal | | | | CD Pontejos |
| | | Luis Alberto Díaz Ruiz | | | | CD Cayón |
| | | Alejandro Marcano Sierra | | | | SD Noja |
| | | Diego Higuera López | | | | SD Reocín |

== Group B ==
=== Galicia ===
Galicia

Head coach: Carlos Ballesta

| No. | Pos. | Player | Date of birth (age) | Caps | Goals | Club |
|---|---|---|---|---|---|---|
| | | Adrián Padrón | | | | |
| 19? | | Anxo Mato | | | 1 | |
| | | César Otero | | | 1 | |
| | GK | Cristopher | | | | |
| | | David Campos | | | | |
| | | David Pérez | | | 1 | |
| | | Diego Otero | | | 1 | |
| | | Felipe | | | 1 | |
| | | Javier Villar | | | | |
| | | Javier Álvarez | | | 1 | |
| | | Jesús | | | | |
| | GK | Lloves | | | | |
| | | Martín | | | | |
| | | Moreira | | | | |
| | | Mouriño | | | 1 | |
| | | Noé | | | | |
| | | Pumar | | | | |
| | | Rafa | | | | |
| | | Souto | | | | |
