= Jorge Espejo (Peruvian footballer) =

Peruvian football manager (born 1976)

Personal information
- Full name: Jorge Luis Espejo Miranda
- Date of birth: 20 August 1976 (age 50)
- Place of birth: Lima, Peru
- Position: Midfielder

Team information
- Current team: Jaguares (head coach)

Youth career
- Cantolao
- Sport Boys

Senior career*
Years	Team	Apps	(Gls)
1995–1999	Sport Boys		
1996	→ Guardia Republicana (loan)	5	(0)
2000	Alianza Lima	19	(0)
2001	Sport Boys		
2002	Melgar	37	(2)
2003–2004	Unión Huaral	64	(0)
2005	Universidad San Martín		
2006	Sport Boys		
2007	Total Clean		
2008	Sport Boys		
2009	Total Chalaco		

Managerial career
- 2010–2011: Deportivo Coopsol
- 2012: Cobresol (interim)
- 2012: Cobresol (youth)
- 2012–2013: Sport Boys
- 2014: Sporting Cristal (assistant)
- 2015: Cienciano
- 2016: Real Garcilaso
- 2017: Cantolao (youth)
- 2017: Comerciantes Unidos
- 2018: Cantolao (youth)
- 2019: Unión Huaral
- 2020–2021: Cantolao
- 2024: Alianza Atlético
- 2026–: Jaguares
- * Club domestic league appearances and goals

Jorge Luis Espejo Miranda (born 20 August 1976) is a Peruvian football manager and former player who played as a midfielder.

== Playing career ==
Born in Lima, Espejo made his senior debut with Sport Boys in 1995. After spending the following year on loan at fellow top-tier side Guardia Republicana, he went on to establish himself as a regular in the Rosados, before moving to Alianza Lima in 2000.

Espejo returned to Sport Boys in 2001, but only remained a year and subsequently signed for FBC Melgar. He then represented Unión Huaral and Universidad San Martín before rejoining Sport Boys for a third spell in 2006.

In 2007, Espejo agreed to a deal with newcomers Total Clean. He rejoined Sport Boys for a fourth period in 2008, before returning to his previous club in 2009, now called Total Chalaco; he retired with the latter in the end of the campaign, aged 33.

== Managerial career ==
Shortly after retiring, Espejo began his managerial career in 2010 while in charge of Deportivo Coopsol. He narrowly missed out promotion in the following year, and subsequently left the club.

In May 2012, Espejo was named manager of Cobresol after the departure of Teddy Cardama, but only as an interim manner, as the club later appointed Javier Chirinos as manager; Espejo was named in charge of the youth setup. On 18 September of that year, he was appointed manager of former club Sport Boys.

Despite suffering relegation, Espejo continued in charge of the club for the 2013 campaign, but resigned on 8 July 2013. On 19 August 2013, he was named Daniel Ahmed's assistant at Sporting Cristal for the 2014 campaign, before taking over Cienciano on 23 December 2014.

On 1 October 2015, Espejo left Cienciano due to the club's financial problems, and was named in charge of Real Garcilaso on 17 December. Sacked the following 1 May, he worked for Cantolao's youth setup before being appointed manager of Comerciantes Unidos.

Espejo subsequently returned to Cantolao's youth sides for the 2018 campaign, and was appointed manager of another former side, Unión Huaral, on 28 January 2019. On 28 October 2020, he rejoined Cantolao for a third spell, but now as a first team manager.

Espejo left Cantolao on a mutual consent on 28 September 2021, and spent more than two years without a club before taking over Alianza Atlético on 1 March 2024. He was sacked from the latter on 28 May, due to poor results.

In August 2026, he was appointed as the new head coach of Jaguares F.C. in the Primera Premier, the third tier of Mexican football.
