= Javier Soria =

Peruvian footballer (born 1974)

Personal information
- Full name: Javier Soria Yoshinari
- Date of birth: 15 December 1974 (age 51)
- Place of birth: Lima, Peru
- Height: 1.78 m (5 ft 10 in)
- Position: Midfielder

Team information
- Current team: Cobresol FBC
- Number: 14

Senior career*
Years	Team	Apps	(Gls)
1998–1999	Alianza Atlético		
2000–2001	Sporting Cristal		
2002–2008	Alianza Atlético		
2009	Cienciano		
2010	Atlético Minero		
2011–2012	Cobresol FBC		
- * Club domestic league appearances and goals

Javier Soria (born 15 December 1974 in Lima) is a Peruvian former footballer who last played for Cobresol FBC.

== Club career ==
Soria has played for a number of clubs in Peru, including Alianza Atlético and Sporting Cristal.

== International career ==
Soria was selected for the Peru squad at Copa América 1999, but never made an appearance.

== Personal life ==
Soria is of Japanese Peruvian descent through his maternal family.
