= Cobresol =

Cobresol FBC
- Full name: Club Deportivo Cobresol FBC
- Nickname: Los dorados
- Founded: 5 February 2008; 18 years ago
- Ground: Estadio 25 de Noviembre, Moquegua, Peru
- Capacity: 21,000
- Chairman: (Peru) Luis Murillo Pamo
- Manager: (Peru) Octavio Vidales
- League: Peruvian Segunda Division
- 2012: Descentralizado, 16th
- Website: http://www.cobresol.net/
Home colours	Away colours

Cobresol FBC was a Peruvian football club based in the city of Moquegua, Peru. Founded in 2008, the club gained promotion from the Segunda División Peruana after winning the 2010 championship, moving to the Torneo Descentralizado in 2011, before being relegated back to Segunda Division after a last-place finish in 2012.

In 2013, the team dissolved due to financial problems.

== Kit and badge ==
2008; Home	2009; Home	2010; Home	2011 – Present; Home

2008; Away	2009; Away	2010; Away	2011; Away	2012-Presente; Away

== Last squad ==
As of 19 July 2011

Note: Flags indicate national team as defined under FIFA eligibility rules; some limited exceptions apply. Players may hold more than one non-FIFA nationality.

No.	Pos.	Nation	Player
1	GK	PER	Michael Sotillo
2	DF	PER	Omar Zegarra
3	DF	PER	Juan Francisco Hernández
5	MF	PER	Jean Pierre Fuentes
6	MF	PER	Israel Tordoya
7	MF	PER	Marko Ciurlizza
8	MF	PER	Edward Campos
9	FW	PER	Antonio Serrano
12	GK	PER	Huber Zúñiga
13	DF	PER	Sergio Ubillús
14	DF	PER	Javier Soria
15	MF	PER	Tomás Zambrano
17	DF	PER	Miguel Llanos
22	DF	PER	Évert Lengua

No.	Pos.	Nation	Player
24	DF	PER	Kerwin Peixoto
25	MF	PER	Gregorio Bernales (captain)
30	FW	NGA	Tunde Enahoro
—	GK	PER	Carlos Iturragui
—	DF	PER	Carlos Flores
—	DF	PER	Felix Goyzueta
—	MF	PER	Piero Casella
—	MF	PER	Nórbil Romero
—	MF	PER	Davis Deza
—	FW	PER	Jaime La Torre
—	FW	PER	Gabriel Gárate
—	FW	PER	Héctor Rojas

== Managers ==
- (Peru) Freddy García (Jan 2010 – Dec 10)
- (Peru) Teddy Cardama (Jan 2011 – April 11)
- (Peru) Jorge Espejo (interim) (May 2012)
- (Peru) Javier Chirinos (May 2012 – July 2012)
- (Peru) Germán Pinillos (July 2012 – September 2012)
- (Peru) Octavio Vidales (September 2012–)

== Honours ==
=== National ===
- Peruvian Segunda División: 1

Winners (1): 2010
Runners-up (1): 2009

=== Regional ===
- Región VII: 1

Winners (1): 2008

- Liga Departamental de Moquegua: 1

Winners (1): 2008

- Liga Provincial de Moquegua: 1

Winners (1): 2008

- Liga Distrital de Moquegua: 1

Winners (1): 2008

== See also ==
- List of football clubs in Peru
- Peruvian football league system
