= 2012 Torneo de Promoción y Reservas =

Torneo de Promoción y Reservas
- Season: 2012
- Champions: Juan Aurich

The Torneo de Promoción y Reservas is a football tournament in Peru. There are currently 16 clubs in the league. Each team will have in staff to twelve 21-year-old players, three of 19 and three experienced; whenever they be recorded in the club. The team champion in this tournament will offer two points and the runner-up a point of bonus to the respective regular team in the 2012 Torneo Descentralizado.

On February 20, 2012, the club Universidad San Martín for extra-sporting issues, announced his definitive retirement from professional football and the local tournament. On March 14, 2012, the club Universidad San Martín, returned to the local tournament and professional football.

== Teams ==
Locations of the 2012 Torneo de Promoción y Reserva teams

Team	City	Stadium	Capacity
Alianza Lima	Lima	Alejandro Villanueva	35,000
Cienciano	Cusco	Garcilaso	40,000
Cobresol	Moquegua	25 de Noviembre	25,000
Inti Gas	Ayacucho	Ciudad de Cumaná	15,000
José Gálvez	Chimbote	Manuel Rivera Sánchez	25,000
Juan Aurich	Chiclayo	Elías Aguirre	24,500
León de Huánuco	Huánuco	Heraclio Tapia	15,000
Melgar	Arequipa	Virgen de Chapi	40,217
Real Garcilaso	Cusco	Garcilaso	40,000
Sport Boys	Callao	Miguel Grau	17,000
Sport Huancayo	Huancayo	Huancayo	20,000
Sporting Cristal	Lima	San Martín de Porres	18,000
Unión Comercio	Nueva Cajamarca	Carlos Vidaurre García	12,000
Universidad César Vallejo	Trujillo	Mansiche	25,000
Universidad San Martín	Lima	San Martín de Porres	18,000
Universitario	Lima	Monumental	80,093

== League table ==
=== Standings ===
Pos	Team	Pld	W	D	L	GF	GA	GD	Pts	Qualification
1	Juan Aurich	30	16	7	7	50	26	+24	55	Bonus +2 to 2012 Torneo Descentralizado
2	Universidad San Martín	30	17	4	9	47	28	+19	55	Bonus +1 to 2012 Torneo Descentralizado
3	Universidad César Vallejo	30	17	3	10	48	36	+12	54	
4	Alianza Lima	30	14	9	7	36	21	+15	51	
5	Sporting Cristal	30	15	5	10	64	33	+31	50	
6	Real Garcilaso	30	14	8	8	56	43	+13	50	
7	Universitario	30	13	8	9	46	32	+14	47	
8	Unión Comercio	30	13	7	10	38	32	+6	46	
9	León de Huánuco	30	12	7	11	44	43	+1	43	
10	José Gálvez	30	9	10	11	52	48	+4	37	
11	Sport Huancayo	30	10	5	15	42	54	−12	35	
12	Melgar	30	8	10	12	42	48	−6	34	
13	Cobresol	30	9	4	17	38	64	−26	31	
14	Sport Boys	30	7	7	16	28	59	−31	28	
15	Cienciano	30	7	6	17	29	59	−30	27	
16	Inti Gas	30	7	4	19	30	66	−36	25	

Updated to match(es) played on 2012. Source:
Rules for classification: 1) points; 2) goal difference; 3) number of goals scored.

=== Results ===
Home \ Away	ALI	CIE	COB	MEL	IGD	JG	JA	LEÓ	RGA	SBA	CRI	SHU	UCO	UCV	USM	UNI
Alianza Lima		2–0	3–0	3–0	2–0	1–1	2–1	3–0 (Note: León de Huánuco's reserve team was not present. Alianza Lima was awarded the match.)	2–1	0–0	1–2	3–1	1–1	3–1	0–1	2–0
Cienciano	1–1		1–0	1–1	0–3	1–1	5–2	0–0	2–3	1–2	0–0	4–3	1–0	2–1	2–1	1–2
Cobresol	1–1	3–0		1–4	2–0	0–2	3–0	1–2	4–2	0–0	1–0	3–1	2–2	1–4	0–2	4–2
Melgar	0–1	1–0	2–2		1–3	2–1	1–0	1–1	3–3	1–1	1–1	6–2	1–3	2–2	3–0 (Note: Matches not played, because Universidad San Martín withdrew from competition.)	0–3
Inti Gas	0–0	0–0	1–2	0–2		1–2	3–2	1–3	1–1	3–2	2–1	2–3	2–0	0–2	3–0	0–3
José Gálvez	0–0	5–1	5–2	2–0	5–2		3–0 (Note: Juan Aurich's reserve team was not present. José Gálvez was awarded the match.)	3–2	0–1	1–1	2–1	1–1	0–0	1–2	1–3	1–1
Juan Aurich	2–2	1–0	2–0	1–0	8–1	1–0		5–0	2–1	6–0	1–1	1–0	3–0	2–0	0–0	0–0
León de Huánuco	0–0	3–2	2–3	2–1	4–1	3–1	0–0		1–1	4–0	3–0	3–2	2–0	2–0	0–2	1–1
Real Garcilaso	2–0	2–0	2–0	3–3	2–0	2–2	2–1	2–0		7–0	2–0	3–3	1–0	3–0	2–0	2–2
Sport Boys	0–2	1–0	3–1	3–1	0–1	1–1	1–1	1–0	2–1		0–2	1–1	3–2	0–3	1–2	0–2
Sporting Cristal	0–1	7–0	10–0	4–1	5–0	4–2	0–1	0–3	7–0	6–3		2–1	1–1	0–0	1–0	2–1
Sport Huancayo	1–0	3–2	2–1	0–1	0–0	3–2	0–3	1–1	2–1	2–0	1–2		1–0	0–1	2–0	3–1
Unión Comercio	2–1	1–2	5–1	3–2	1–0	2–1	0–0	1–0	1–0	1–0	1–0	4–1		3–0 (Note: Universidad César Vallejo's reserve team was not present. Unión Comercio was awarded the match.)	1–0	0–0
Universidad César Vallejo	1–0	4–0	2–0	1–0	3–1	2–2	0–1	2–1	2–0	4–2	2–3	3–1	2–1		3–1	2–0
Universidad San Martín	1–0	3–0	1–0	1–1	3–0	6–3	2–0	6–0	1–1	2–0	0–1	2–1	3–1	1–0		2–1
Universitario	1–2	3–0	1–0	0–0	6–0	2–1	0–2	2–1	2–3	1–0	4–1	1–0	1–1	3–0	1–0	

Updated to match(es) played on 2012. Source: ADFP.org.pe
Legend: Blue = home team win; Yellow = draw; Red = away team win.

== Title playoffs ==
12 September 2012
15:00

Universidad San Martín	0–1	Juan Aurich
		Anderson Cueto 92'

Villa Deportiva USMP, Lima
Referee: Ivan Chang
19 September 2012
20:00

Juan Aurich	0–0	Universidad San Martín

Elías Aguirre, Chiclayo

== Top goalscorers ==
16 goals

- (Peru) José Lolandes (Sport Huancayo)
