= Israel Tordoya =

Peruvian footballer (born 1980)

Personal information
- Full name: Israel Jhonatan Tordoya Isidro
- Date of birth: 21 February 1980 (age 46)
- Place of birth: Lima, Peru
- Height: 1.83 m (6 ft 0 in)
- Position: Midfielder

Senior career*
Years	Team	Apps	(Gls)
2007–2008	Atlético Torino		
2009	Alianza Atlético	34	(3)
2010	Sporting Cristal	5	(0)
2010	Alianza Atlético	12	(0)
2011	Inti Gas	12	(0)
2012	Cobresol	29	(0)
2013	Alfonso Ugarte de Puno	7	(0)
2014	Sport Victoria	18	(1)
- * Club domestic league appearances and goals

Israel Jhonatan Tordoya Isidro (born 21 February 1980) is a Peruvian former professional footballer who played as a defensive midfielder.

== Club career ==
Tordoya played for Copa Perú Division side Atlético Torino in 2007.

Then in January 2009 Tordoya joined Alianza Atlético. There he made his Torneo Descentralizado debut in Round 1 of the 2009 season at home to Universitario de Deportes. He came on as substitute for Daniel Peláez late in the match, which finished in a 2–1 win for Universitario.

Manager Teddy Cardama put him in the starting line-up for the first time in Round 5 in the 2–0 home win against Coronel Bolognesi. Tordoya managed to make 34 league appearances with three goals and also play in three Copa Sudamericana matches that season.

In January 2010 Tordoya signed for Sporting Cristal for the start of the 2010 season. He made his league debut for the Cristal in Round 2 at home to FBC Melgar. Manager Víctor Rivera substituted him in for Carlos Lobaton in the 71st minute to wrap up the 3–1 win for his side. He played his first game as a starter in the 2–1 away win over Sport Boys. He only managed to make five league appearances for Cristal and played his last game for them in Round 21 away to Universidad San Martín, which finished in a 2–1 loss for his club.

In September 2010 he returned to Alianza Atlético for the end of the 2010 season.
