= Tunde Enahoro =

Nigerian footballer (born 1990)

Tunde Enahoro (born 16 October 1990) is a Nigerian former professional footballer who played as a striker.

== Early life ==
Enahoro, sometimes nicknamed "Kenny", was born in 1990 in Abuja, Nigeria, and moved to Europe at a young age.

== Career ==
Enahoro played for Andalucia at the 2011 UEFA Regions' Cup.

In 2011, Enahoro signed for Peruvian side Cienciano. Before the 2012 season, he signed for Peruvian side Cobresol. While playing for the club, he became regarded temporarily as one of the best strikers in the Peruvian league, which earned him the nickname "Panther".

In 2012, he signed for Peruvian side Universitario, where he was hampered by injury. After that, he stayed in Peru, which was regarded as a surprise to many Peruvians.

== Style of play ==
Enahoro mainly operated as a striker and was known for his power and has been compared to Peru international Pedro Pablo León.

== Post-playing career ==
After retiring from professional football, Enahoro ran a cleaning products business.

== Personal life ==
Enahoro has been married and has a daughter. He is a Peruvian citizen.
