= Carlos Flores (footballer, born 1978) =

Peruvian footballer

Personal information
- Full name: Carlos Alberto Flores Ascencio
- Date of birth: 10 August 1978 (age 48)
- Place of birth: Peru
- Height: 1.84 m (6 ft 0 in)
- Position: Centre back

Team information
- Current team: Cobresol

Senior career*
Years	Team	Apps	(Gls)
1999	Deportivo Pesquero		
2003	Estudiantes de Med.		
2006	Deportivo Ingeniería		
2007	Tarapacá de Huánuco		
2008	Sport Águila		
2008	Sport Huancayo		
2009	Sport Águila	15	(0)
2010	Sport Huancayo	19	(1)
2011–	Cobresol	33	(2)
- * Club domestic league appearances and goals as of 27 August 2012

Carlos Alberto Flores Ascencio (born 10 August 1978) is a Peruvian footballer who plays as a centre back. He plays for Cobresol in the Torneo Descentralizado.

== Club career ==
Flores started his career with Deportivo Pesquero in 1999. That season he made his top-flight debut in the Torneo Descentralizado.

Later in 2003 he had spell with Estudiantes de Medicina in the 2003 season. There he played alongside his brother Juan "Chiquito" Flores.

Then in 2006 he played in the Copa Perú division with Deportivo Ingeniería and then the next season with Tarapacá de Huánuco.

The following seasons he would have spells with Sport Águila and Sport Huancayo. In his last spell with Huancayo he returned to the Descentralizado in the 2010 season, making 19 appearances and scoring 1 goal.
