= Évert Lengua =

Peruvian footballer (born 1983)

Personal information
- Full name: Evert Erickson Wilmer; Lengua Vergara
- Date of birth: 20 January 1983 (age 43)
- Place of birth: Pisco, Peru
- Position: Centre back

Team information
- Current team: Cobresol

Senior career*
Years	Team	Apps	(Gls)
2002–2004	Estudiantes de Medicina	?	(?)
2007	Universidad César Vallejo	?	(?)
2008	La Peña Sporting	?	(?)
2008	Sport Huamanga	2	(0)
2009–	Cobresol	64	(0)
- * Club domestic league appearances and goals as of 27 August 2012

Évert Erickson Wilmer Lengua Vergara (born 20 January 1983) is a Peruvian footballer who plays as a centre back. He currently plays for Cobresol in the Torneo Descentralizado.

== Club career ==
Lengua played for Estudiantes de Medicina in the 2002 Torneo Descentralizado season. He played in Peruvian top-flight for the Ica based side until the end of the 2004 season.

Then he joined Universidad César Vallejo in 2007. Then in 2008 he had a short spell with Segunda División side La Peña Sporting and later Copa Perú side Sport Huamanga.

Then in January 2009 he joined Cobresol.
