= Michael Sotillo =

Peruvian footballer (born 1984)

Personal information
- Full name: Michael Anthony Sotillo Cañari
- Date of birth: 23 September 1984 (age 42)
- Place of birth: Tacna, Peru
- Height: 1.82 m (6 ft 0 in)
- Position: Goalkeeper

Team information
- Current team: Deportivo Municipal
- Number: 29

Senior career*
Years	Team	Apps	(Gls)
2001-2006	Sport Boys		
2007-2008	Univ. San Marcos		
2008	Sport Boys		
2009	IDUNSA		
2010-2012	Cobresol	58	(0)
2013-2015	Sport Huancayo	28	(0)
2016	Cultural Santa Rosa	25	(0)
2017	Comerciantes Unidos	8	(0)
2018-2021	Binacional	71	(0)
2022	Deportivo Municipal	1	(0)
- * Club domestic league appearances and goals

Michael Anthony Sotillo Cañari (born September 23, 1984) is a Peruvian footballer who plays as a goalkeeper for Deportivo Municipal in Peruvian Primera División (also known as Liga 1 Clausura).

== Club career ==
Michael Sotillo began his career with Sport Boys in 2002. He then had a brief spell in the Segunda División playing for C.D. Universidad San Marcos during the 2007 season.

He returned to Sport Boys in January 2008. He made his debut in the Torneo Descentralizado in round 2 of the 2008 season at home against Cienciano, when he replaced Salomón Libman in goal and managed to keep a clean-sheet.
