= Sergio Ubillús =

Peruvian footballer (born 1980)

Personal information
- Full name: Sergio Hernán Ubillús Segura
- Date of birth: 1 January 1980 (age 46)
- Place of birth: Chiclayo, Peru
- Height: 1.71 m (5 ft 7 in)
- Position: Left back

Team information
- Current team: Cobresol

Senior career*
Years	Team	Apps	(Gls)
2000–2001	Universitario		
2002	Juan Aurich		
2003	Cienciano		
2003	Sport Boys		
2004–2006	Univ. San Martín		
2007–2008	Sport Ancash	65	(2)
2009	Univ. César Vallejo	14	(1)
2009–2010	Total Chalaco	40	(0)
2011–	Cobresol	46	(0)
- * Club domestic league appearances and goals as of 27 August 2012

Sergio Hernán Ubillús Segura (born 1 January 1980) is a Peruvian footballer who plays as a left back for Cobresol in the Torneo Descentralizado.

== Club career ==
Sergio Ubillús began his senior career in the Torneo Descentralizado with Universitario de Deportes in the 2000 season playing under manager Roberto Challe. He stayed with Universitario only until the next season.
