= Jean Pierre Fuentes =

Peruvian footballer (born 1991)

Personal information
- Full name: Jean Pierre Fuentes Siguas
- Date of birth: October 18, 1991 (age 35)
- Place of birth: Lima, Peru
- Height: 1.86 m (6 ft 1 in)
- Position: Defensive midfielder

Team information
- Current team: UTC
- Number: 5

Youth career
- Alianza Lima

Senior career*
Years	Team	Apps	(Gls)
2008–2010	Alianza Lima	1	(0)
2011–2012	Cobresol FBC	27	(1)
2012–2013	Unión Comercio	21	(2)
2014	León de Huánuco	2	(0)
2015	Sport Loreto	23	(1)
2016–2017	Unión Comercio	66	(7)
2018	Melgar	25	(0)
2019–2022	Carlos A. Mannucci	70	(6)
2022–2023	Deportivo Garcilaso	12	(1)
2023–	UTC	12	(0)
- * Club domestic league appearances and goals as of 29 September 2023

Jean Pierre Fuentes Siguas (born October 18, 1991, in Lima) is a Peruvian footballer, who currently plays for UTC as a defensive midfielder.

== Club career ==
Jean Pierre came through the youth divisions of Alianza Lima. He was promoted to the first team in 2008. He made his official debut against Alianza Atlético. In January 2011 he joined newly promoted team Cobresol FBC. He made his debut for Cobresol FBC on April 30, 2011, against Inti Gas Deportes.
