= 2009–10 Spanish stage of the UEFA Regions' Cup =

Tournament details
- Host country: Spain
- Dates: 6 December 2009 – 4 April 2010
- Teams: 17
- Venue(s): 9 (in 5 host cities)

Final positions
- Champions: Galicia (1st title)
- Runners-up: Andalusia

The 2009–10 Spanish stage of the UEFA Regions' Cup was the sixth edition of this tournament. Organised by the Royal Spanish Football Federation, the winner qualified for the 2011 UEFA Regions' Cup.

== Squads ==
Each region had to submit a squad of 18 players.

== First round ==
Legend for Qualifying Countries
Regions that directly qualified for the semi-finals
Regions that advanced to the play-off

=== Group A ===
Team	Pld	W	D	L	GF	GA	GD	Pts
Andalusia	2	2	0	0	2	0	+2	6
Catalonia	2	1	0	1	3	2	+1	3
Cantabria	2	1	0	1	4	5	-1	3
Valencian Community	2	0	0	2	2	4	-2	0

7 December 2009
10:00 UTC+1

Cantabria	3 – 2	Valencian Community
30' (o.g.); Pablo Sánchez; Rocha		Gasch 23'

Campo Municipal Príncipe de Asturias, Sanlúcar la Mayor, Sevilla
Referee: Sergio Portillo Raigón (Sevilla)
7 December 2009
12:30 UTC+1

Andalusia	1 – 0	Catalonia
Pibe 15'

Campo Municipal Príncipe de Asturias, Sanlúcar la Mayor, Sevilla
Attendance: 500
Referee: Miguel Ángel Fernández Delgado (Sevilla)
8 December 2009
10:00 UTC+1

Cantabria	1 – 3	Catalonia
Liaño 81'		Pep Centaño 27'; Charly 76'; Triguero 90 +7'

Campo Municipal Príncipe de Asturias, Sanlúcar la Mayor, Sevilla
Referee: Juan Manuel García Gutiérrez (Sevilla)
8 December 2009
12:30 UTC+1

Andalusia	1 – 0	Valencian Community
Gordi 80'	Report

Campo Municipal Príncipe de Asturias, Sanlúcar la Mayor, Sevilla
Attendance: 300
Referee: José Luis Pedroso Ramos (Sevilla)

=== Group B ===
Team	Pld	W	D	L	GF	GA	GD	Pts
Galicia	2	1	1	0	4	0	+4	4
Basque Country	2	1	1	0	2	1	+1	4
Murcia	2	0	0	2	1	6	-5	0

6 December 2009
16:30 UTC+1

Galicia	0 – 0	Basque Country

Os Remedios, Ourense
Attendance: 350
Referee: José Ramón Jiménez Alberte (Ourense)
7 December 2009
16:30 UTC+1

Basque Country	2 – 1	Murcia
Asier Butrón 31' 70'		Daniel Avalos 75'

Os Remedios, Ourense
Referee: José Daniel Rodicio González (Ourense)
8 December 2009
16:30 UTC+1

Galicia	4 – 0	Murcia
Anxo Mato 29'; Diego Otero 36'; David Pérez 43'; Javi Álvarez 63'

Os Carrís, Barbadás
Referee: David Pérez Pallas (Ourense)

=== Group C ===
Team	Pld	W	D	L	GF	GA	GD	Pts
Canary Islands	2	1	1	0	2	1	+1	4
Aragon	2	1	1	0	1	0	+1	4
Asturias	2	0	0	2	1	2	-1	0

6 December 2009
12:00 UTC+1

Asturias	0 – 1	Aragon
	Report	Charly 64'

Campo Les Caleyes, Villaviciosa
Referee: Juan Carlo Toyos Acosta
7 December 2009
12:00 UTC+1

Canary Islands	0 – 0	Aragon

Campo El Florán, Sotrondio
Referee: Alvaro Peláez Fernández (Nalón)
8 December 2009
12:00 UTC+1

Asturias	1 – 2	Canary Islands
Jon Carrera 31'	Report	Nadal 56'; Yanes 77'

Escuela de Fútbol de Mareo, Gijón
Attendance: 200
Referee: Hugo Montero Arango (Gijón)

=== Group D ===
Team	Pld	W	D	L	GF	GA	GD	Pts
(Castile and León) Castilla y León	2	1	1	0	2	1	+1	4
(Castilla–La Mancha) Castilla-La Mancha	2	1	0	1	2	3	-1	3
(Community of Madrid) Madrid	2	0	1	1	2	2	0	1

6 December 2009
17:00 UTC+1

Castilla y León (Castile and León)	2 – 0	(Castilla–La Mancha) Castilla-La Mancha
Mato 78'; Gustavo 92'

Nueva Balastera, Palencia
Referee: David Dolz García
7 December 2009
16:00 UTC+1

Madrid (Community of Madrid)	1 – 2	(Castilla–La Mancha) Castilla-La Mancha
Alberto Sáez 40' (pen.)		Joaquín Moya 8' 36'

Municipal Venta de Baños, Venta de Baños
Referee: Víctor Gijón Peñas (Valladolid)
8 December 2009
17:00 UTC+1

Castilla y León (Castile and León)	1 – 1	(Community of Madrid) Madrid
Gustavo 75'		Bretón 15'

Nueva Balastera, Palencia
Referee: Fernando Román Román (Palencia

=== Group E ===
Team	Pld	W	D	L	GF	GA	GD	Pts
Balearic Islands	2	1	1	0	1	0	+1	4
Extremadura	2	1	0	1	1	1	0	3
Ceuta	2	0	2	0	0	0	0	2
Melilla	2	0	1	1	0	1	-1	1

5 December 2009
10:00 UTC+1

Ceuta	0 – 0	Balearic Islands

Ciudad Deportiva Municipal de Olivenza, Olivenza
Referee: José Luis Durán Tato
5 December 2009
12:30 UTC+1

Extremadura	1 – 0	Melilla
Francis 89'

Ciudad Deportiva Municipal de Olivenza, Olivenza
Referee: Lorenzo Jaramillo Arroyo
6 December 2009
10:00 UTC+1

Melilla	0 – 0	Ceuta

Ciudad Deportiva Municipal de Olivenza, Olivenza
Referee: Francisco Lorenzo Martínez Lemus
6 December 2009
12:30 UTC+1

Extremadura	0 – 1	Balearic Islands
		Jaime Rayo 33'

Ciudad Deportiva Municipal de Olivenza, Olivenza
Referee: Francisco José Hernández Maeso

== Play-off ==
Castilla y León (Castile and León)	1 – 1	Balearic Islands
Gustavo 58'		Jordi 36'

Estadio El Montecillo, Aranda de Duero
Referee: Hernández Cifuentes
17 February 2010

Balearic Islands	3 – 0	(Castile and León) Castilla y León
Jordi 9' 84'; Edu 19'	Report

Campo de Son Malferit, Palma de Mallorca
Referee: Martín García

== Semi-finals ==
1 April 2010
17:00 UTC+1

Canary Islands	2 – 5	Andalusia

Estadio A Nova Senra, Ribadumia
Referee: Arturo Díaz Álvarez
1 April 2010
17:00 UTC+1

Galicia (Galicia (Spain))	1 – 1 (a.e.t.)	Balearic Islands
Mouriño
Penalties
Penalty scored Penalty missed	5–4	Penalty scored Penalty missed

Estadio Novo San Pedro, Villalonga
Referee: Miguel Ángel Miñán Fernández

== Final ==
4 April 2010
11:00 UTC+1

Galicia (Galicia (Spain))	2–1 (a.e.t.)	Andalusia
César Otero 54'; Felipe 119'		Mere 72'

Campo do Baltar, Portonovo
Attendance: 600
Referee: Ignacio Iglesias Villanueva (Ferrol)

VIII UEFA Region's Cup (Spain)

Galicia
First title

Galicia	Andalusia

GALICIA:
GK	Cristopher
Noé	(yellow card) 69'
Adrián Padrón
David Campos
Pumar
Martín	(substituted off) 77'
Jesús	(yellow card) 69'
Mouriño	(yellow card) 52'	(substituted off) 55'
César Otero	(yellow card) 34'	(substituted off) 87'
David Pérez
Diego
Substitutes:
GK	Lloves
Souto	(substituted off) 55'
Felipe	(yellow card) 115'	(substituted off) 77'
Javi Villar	(yellow card) 89'	(substituted off) 87'
Moreira
Rafa
Javi Álvarez
Manager:
(Spain) (Galicia (Spain)) Carlos Ballesta

ANDALUSIA:
Substitutes:
Manager:
(Spain) (Andalusia) Julián Roales

Assistant referees:
(Galicia (Spain)) Dario García
(Galicia (Spain)) Rodolfo Otero

Match rules:

- 90 minutes
- 30 minutes of extra time if scores level
- Penalty shoot-out if scores still level
- Of 7 substitutes named, three may be used

== Scorers ==
3 goals

- (Castile and León) Gustavo (1 in play-off)

2 goals

- (Basque Country (autonomous community)) Asier Butrón
- (Castilla–La Mancha) Joaquin Moya

1 goal

- (Andalusia) Gordi
- (Andalusia) Pibe
- (Aragon) Charly
- (Asturias) Jon Carrera
- (Balearic Islands) Jaime Rayo
- (Canary Islands) Nadal
- (Canary Islands) Roberto Yanes
- (Castile and León) Alberto Mato
- (Extremadura) Francis
- (Galicia (Spain)) Anxo Mato
- (Galicia (Spain)) Diego Otero
- (Galicia (Spain)) David Pérez
- (Galicia (Spain)) Javier Álvarez
- (Galicia (Spain)) Mouriño (in semifinals)
- (Galicia (Spain)) César Otero (in the final)
- (Galicia (Spain)) Felipe (in the final)
- (Community of Madrid) Alberto Sáez
- (Community of Madrid) Bretón
- (Region of Murcia) Daniel Avalos
- (Valencian Community) José Antonio Gasch
