= Paul Ramos =

Argentine footballer (1990–2019)

Personal information
- Full name: Joan Paul Ramos
- Date of birth: 22 May 1990
- Place of birth: Córdoba, Argentina
- Date of death: 17 February 2019 (aged 28)
- Place of death: Yofre Norte, Argentina
- Height: 1.77 m (5 ft 10 in)
- Position: Defender

Youth career
- 1998–2010: Belgrano

Senior career*
Years	Team	Apps	(Gls)
2010–2013	Belgrano	16	(1)
2013–2014	Racing de Córdoba		
2014	Mitre	1	(0)
2015–2016	Racing de Córdoba		
2017	Sport Loreto	16	(2)
2018–2019	Gimnasia y Esgrima	15	(2)
Total		48	(5)
- * Club domestic league appearances and goals

Joan Paul Ramos (22 May 1990 – 17 February 2019) was an Argentine professional footballer who played as a defender.

== Club career ==
Belgrano gave Ramos his senior start, after signing him in 1998. He was sent off on his professional debut in Primera B Nacional against Patronato on 8 August 2010, receiving two yellow cards inside seven minutes of each other; in a fixture that saw three other sending offs. Ramos appeared sixteen times, along with his first senior goal versus Boca Unidos in October, as Belgrano won promotion to the Primera División. He stayed for two further seasons, but did not make a further appearance in the league – though he was an unused substitute six times. In June 2013, Ramos joined Racing de Córdoba of Torneo Argentino B.

One year later, on 30 June 2014, Torneo Federal A's Mitre signed Ramos. He made four appearances in league and cup in 2014, before sealing a return to tier four with Racing de Córdoba. Ahead of January 2017, Ramos switched Argentina for Peru after agreeing terms with Sport Loreto. He participated in sixteen fixtures for the Segunda División side, while also scoring goals in matches with César Vallejo and Sport Boys. Ramos returned to Argentina in 2018, completing a move to Gimnasia y Esgrima in Torneo Federal A; making fifteen appearances and netting two goals. His final games arrived during the 2018–19 campaign.

== International career ==
In 2007, Ramos received a call-up to train with the Argentina U17s.

== Personal life ==
In February 2019, it was announced that Ramos had died following a two-vehicle traffic collision on 17 February. Driving a Peugeot 207 in the early hours of Sunday morning, Ramos died at the scene having collided with a Chevrolet Agile carrying two occupants; who were rushed to hospital with trauma.

== Career statistics ==
Appearances and goals by club, season and competition
Club	Season	League			Cup		Continental		Other		Total	
Club	Season	Division	Apps	Goals	Apps	Goals	Apps	Goals	Apps	Goals	Apps	Goals
Belgrano	2010–11	Primera B Nacional	16	1	0	0	—		0	0	16	1
Belgrano	2011–12	Primera División	0	0	1	0	—		0	0	1	0
Belgrano	2012–13	Primera División	0	0	0	0	—		0	0	0	0
Belgrano	Total		16	1	1	0	—		0	0	17	1
Mitre	2014	Torneo Federal A	1	0	2	0	—		1 (Note: Appearance(s) in the Torneo Federal A play-offs)	0	4	0
Sport Loreto	2017	Segunda División	16	2	—		—		0	0	16	2
Gimnasia y Esgrima	2017–18	Torneo Federal A	8	1	0	0	—		0	0	8	1
Gimnasia y Esgrima	2018–19	Torneo Federal A	7	1	0	0	—		0	0	7	1
Gimnasia y Esgrima	Total		15	2	0	0	—		0	0	15	2
Career total			48	5	3	0	—		1	0	52	5
