= Davis Deza =

Peruvian football midfielder (born 1992)

Personal information
- Full name: Davis Joseph Deza Mauricio
- Date of birth: 26 March 1992 (age 34)
- Place of birth: Lima, Peru
- Height: 1.74 m (5 ft 8 1/2 in)
- Position: Left midfielder

Team information
- Current team: Universitario de Deportes

Youth career
- ?–2009: Universitario

Senior career*
| Years | Team | Apps | (Gls) |
| 2009–2011 | Universitario | 1 | (0) |
- * Club domestic league appearances and goals as of 12 August 2011

Davis Joseph Deza Mauricio (born 26 March 1992 in Lima) is a Peruvian football midfielder who currently plays for the Peruvian Primera División club Universitario de Deportes.
