= Rafael Guarderas =

Peruvian footballer (born 1993)

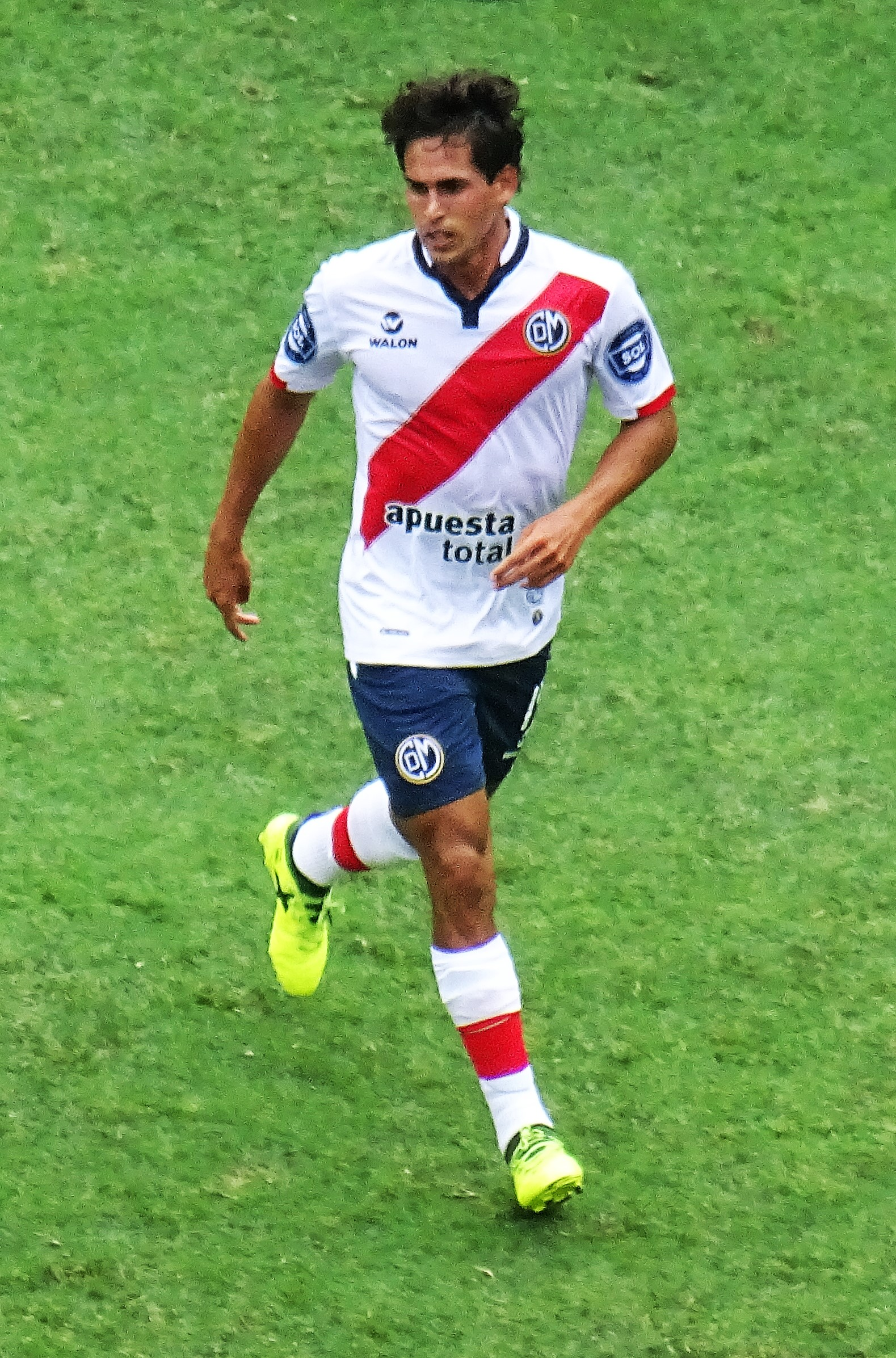
- Guarderas in 2018

Personal information
- Full name: Rafael Nicanor Guarderas Saravia
- Date of birth: 12 September 1993 (age 33)
- Place of birth: Lima, Peru
- Height: 1.76 m (5 ft 9 in)
- Position: Midfielder

Team information
- Current team: Atlético Grau
- Number: 5

Youth career
- 2005–2010: Regatas Lima
- 2010–2012: Universitario de Deportes

Senior career*
| Years | Team | Apps | (Gls) |
| 2012–2017 | Universitario | 44 | (3) |
| 2015 | → USM Porres (loan) | 6 | (0) |
| 2016 | → UTC (loan) | 11 | (0) |
| 2017–2018 | Deportivo Municipal | 68 | (3) |
| 2019 | UTC | 11 | (0) |
| 2019–2023 | Universitario | 54 | (0) |
| 2022 | → Alianza Atlético (loan) | 11 | (0) |
| 2023 | Cantolao | 29 | (0) |
| 2024- | Atlético Grau | 71 | (1) |

International career
| 2012–2013 | Peru U20 | 9 | (0) |
| 2015 | Peru U22 | 2 | (0) |
- * Club domestic league appearances and goals as of 23 March 2026

Rafael Nicanor Guarderas Saravia (born 12 September 1993) is a Peruvian professional footballer who plays for Liga 1 club Atlético Grau. He is usually deployed as a deep-lying playmaker.

== Club career ==
Guarderas moved up to the Universitario de Deportes first team in January 2012. He made his Torneo Descentralizado league debut in an away match against Inti Gas Deportes. He played the entire match but could not help Universitario avoid the 0–1 defeat.

Guarderas re-joined UTC for the 2019 season. Already in June 2019, he left the club to return to Universitario.

On 13 December 2022, it was announced that Guarderes would join Cantolao on 1 January 2023.

== Career statistics ==
=== Club ===
As of 23 March 2026.

| Club | Season | League | | Cup | | Continental | | Total | |
| Club | Season | Apps | Goals | Apps | Goals | Apps | Goals | Apps | Goals |
|---|---|---|---|---|---|---|---|---|---|
| Universitario | 2012 | 1 | 0 | 0 | 0 | 0 | 0 | 1 | 0 |
| Universitario | 2013 | 13 | 2 | 2 | 1 | 0 | 0 | 15 | 3 |
| Universitario | 2014 | 15 | 0 | 4 | 0 | 0 | 0 | 19 | 0 |
| Universitario | 2015 | 6 | 0 | 9 | 0 | 0 | 0 | 15 | 0 |
| Universitario | Total | 35 | 2 | 15 | 1 | 0 | 0 | 50 | 3 |
| USM Porres | 2015 | 6 | 0 | 0 | 0 | 0 | 0 | 6 | 0 |
| Universitario | 2016 | 2 | 0 | 0 | 0 | 0 | 0 | 2 | 0 |
| UTC | 2016 | 11 | 0 | 0 | 0 | 0 | 0 | 11 | 0 |
| Deportivo Municipal | 2017 | 35 | 2 | 0 | 0 | 2 | 0 | 37 | 2 |
| Deportivo Municipal | 2018 | 33 | 1 | 0 | 0 | 0 | 0 | 33 | 1 |
| Deportivo Municipal | Total | 68 | 3 | 0 | 0 | 2 | 0 | 70 | 3 |
| UTC | 2019 | 11 | 0 | 0 | 0 | 2 | 0 | 13 | 0 |
| Universitario | 2019 | 15 | 0 | 3 | 1 | 0 | 0 | 18 | 1 |
| Universitario | 2020 | 16 | 0 | 0 | 0 | 3 | 0 | 19 | 0 |
| Universitario | 2021 | 19 | 0 | 1 | 0 | 5 | 0 | 25 | 0 |
| Universitario | 2022 | 4 | 0 | 0 | 0 | 1 | 0 | 5 | 0 |
| Universitario | Total | 54 | 0 | 4 | 1 | 9 | 0 | 67 | 1 |
| Alianza Atlético | 2022 | 11 | 0 | 0 | 0 | 0 | 0 | 11 | 0 |
| Cantolao | 2023 | 29 | 0 | 0 | 0 | 0 | 0 | 29 | 0 |
| Atlético Grau | 2024 | 33 | 0 | 0 | 0 | 0 | 0 | 33 | 0 |
| Atlético Grau | 2025 | 31 | 1 | 0 | 0 | 7 | 0 | 38 | 1 |
| Atlético Grau | 2026 | 7 | 0 | 0 | 0 | 0 | 0 | 7 | 0 |
| Atlético Grau | Total | 71 | 1 | 0 | 0 | 7 | 0 | 78 | 1 |
| Career total | | 298 | 6 | 19 | 2 | 20 | 0 | 337 | 8 |

== Honours ==
Universitario de Deportes

- Torneo Descentralizado: 2013
- Torneo Apertura 2020
