= Javier Chirinos =

Peruvian footballer and manager (born 1960)

Personal information
- Full name: Javier Ernesto Chirinos Ramírez
- Date of birth: 8 May 1960 (age 66)
- Place of birth: Lima, Peru
- Height: 1.84 m (6 ft 0 in)
- Position: Midfielder

Senior career*
Years	Team	Apps	(Gls)
1978–1982	Atlético Chalaco		
1983–1988	Universitario		
1989	Defensor Lima		
1990	San Agustín		
1991	Deportivo Municipal		
1992	Sport Boys		

International career
1985–1989	Peru	19	(0)

Managerial career
- 2001: Universitario (caretaker)
- 2002: Universitario (caretaker)
- 2003: Universitario (caretaker)
- 2008–2009: Am. Cochahuayco
- 2010: Universitario (caretaker)
- 2010–2011: Universitario U20
- 2012: Cobresol
- 2015: Rinconada
- 2018: Universitario (caretaker)
- * Club domestic league appearances and goals

Javier Ernesto Chirinos Ramírez (born 8 May 1960) is a Peruvian football manager and former player who manages Cobresol in the Torneo Descentralizado. During his playing career as a midfielder he most notably played for Atlético Chalaco and Universitario de Deportes.

== Playing career ==
=== Club ===
Javier Chirinos began his professional playing career with Atlético Chalaco in 1978. Between 1983 and 1988, he played for Universitario de Deportes, where he made 206 appearances (scoring 6 goals) and won two Peruvian championships in 1985 and 1987. After brief stints with Defensor Lima, San Agustín and Deportivo Municipal, he ended his career with Sport Boys in 1992.

=== International ===
While playing for Universitario, Chirinos made his debut for the senior Peru national team in 1985. He made a total of 20 appearances for Peru between 1985 and 1989.

== Managerial career ==
In 2001 Chirinos acted as caretaker manager of Universitario de Deportes after the sacking of Teddy Cardama. There Javier made his Descentralizado debut as a manager coaching the club for four matches in the 2001 season. Chirinos gained more experience in top-flight by acting as the caretaker manager again in 2002 after the resignation of Osvaldo Piazza and once more the following season after the departure of Ricardo Ortiz.

Chirinos returned to act as the caretaker manager for Universitario for six matches in 2010 after Chemo del Solar was at the time unable to meet the requirements to coach in the Descentralizado.

In 2012, he had a short-lived experience as head of Cobresol.

== Honours ==
=== Player ===
Universitario

- Torneo Descentralizado: 1985, 1987

=== Manager ===
Universitario U20

- U-20 Copa Libertadores: 2011
