= Rolando Bogado =

Paraguayan association footballer

Personal information
- Full name: Rolando Marciano Bogado Vázquez
- Date of birth: 3 November 1978 (age 48)
- Place of birth: Villarrica, Paraguay
- Height: 1.82 m (6 ft 0 in)
- Position: Defender

Senior career*
Years	Team	Apps	(Gls)
2005–2006	Libertad		
2006	Godoy Cruz		
2007	3 de Febrero		
2008	Libertad		
2009	Nacional		
2009–2010	Rubio Ñú	35	(2)
2011–2012	Independiente F.B.C.	36	(1)
2012	Sportivo Luqueño	35	(1)
2013	Real Garcilaso		
2014	Necaxa	4	(0)
2014	Cobresal	12	(0)
2015–2016	UT Cajamarca	36	(3)
2016	Sportivo Luqueño	3	(0)
2017	Independiente F.B.C.	15	(1)
2018	Ayacucho	31	(1)
2019	Alianza Universidad	12	(0)
- * Club domestic league appearances and goals

Rolando Marciano Bogado Vázquez (born 22 April 1984) is a Paraguayan former professional footballer who played as a defender.

== Honours ==
- Peruvian Primera División Best Defender: 2013
