= Edwin Retamoso =

Peruvian footballer (born 1982)

Personal information
- Full name: Edwin Retamoso Palomino
- Date of birth: 3 February 1982 (age 44)
- Place of birth: Abancay, Peru
- Height: 1.72 m (5 ft 8 in)
- Position: Defensive midfielder

Senior career*
Years	Team	Apps	(Gls)
2005–2008	Atlético Minero	44	(0)
2009	Inti Gas Deportes	34	(2)
2010–2012	Cienciano	96	(4)
2013–2014	Real Garcilaso	64	(1)
2014–2015	Cobreloa	5	(0)
2015–2017	Real Garcilaso	76	(2)

International career
2011–2015	Peru	10	(0)
Medal record
Representing Peru
Association football
Copa America
Bronze medal – third place	Chile 2015
- * Club domestic league appearances and goals

Edwin Retamoso Palomino (born 23 February 1982) is a Peruvian former international footballer who played as a defensive midfielder.

== Club career ==
Retamoso has played for Atlético Minero, Inti Gas Deportes and Cienciano.

== International career ==
He made his international debut for Peru in 2011.
