= John Galliquio =

Peruvian footballer (born 1979)

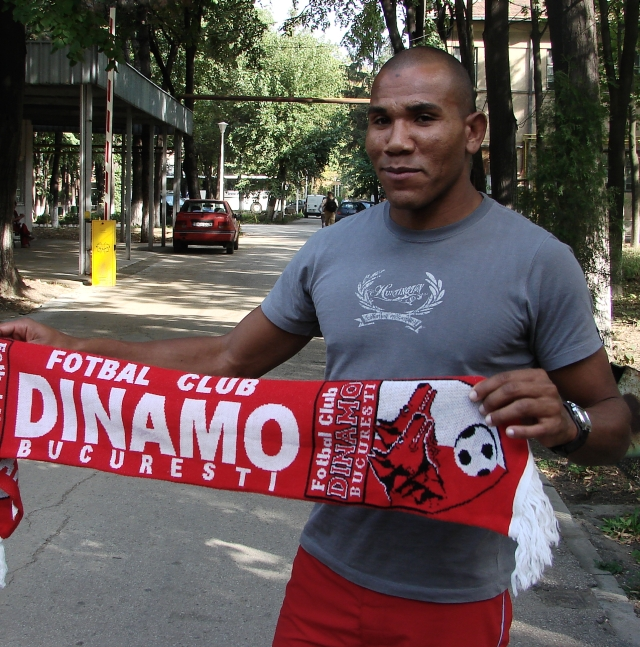
- Galliquio with Dinamo Bucharest

Personal information
- Full name: John Christian Galliquio Castro
- Date of birth: 12 January 1979 (age 47)
- Place of birth: Pisco, Peru
- Height: 1.80 m (5 ft 11 in)
- Position: Centre-back

Senior career*
| Years | Team | Apps | (Gls) |
| 1998 | Estudiantes de Medicina | | |
| 1999–2002 | Universitario | 97 | (0) |
| 1999 | → América Cochahuayco (loan) | | |
| 2002–2003 | Cruz Azul Hidalgo | 5 | (0) |
| 2003–2004 | Racing | 16 | (0) |
| 2004–2005 | Universitario | 50 | (3) |
| 2005 | Sporting Cristal | 7 | (0) |
| 2006 | Universidad San Martín | 23 | (0) |
| 2007 | Universitario | 12 | (0) |
| 2007–2008 | Dinamo Bucharest | 8 | (0) |
| 2009–2013 | Universitario | 146 | (8) |
| 2014 | León de Huánuco | 14 | (2) |
| 2015 | Melgar | 16 | (0) |
| 2016–2017 | Universitario | 20 | (2) |
| 2018 | Serrato Pacasmayo | 10 | (1) |
| Total | | 424 | (16) |

International career
| 2003–2012 | Peru | 41 | (1) |
Medal record
Universitario
| Winner | Peruvian League | 2000 |
| Winner | Peruvian League | 2009 |
| Winner | Peruvian League | 2013 |
Melgar
| Winner | Peruvian League | 2015 |
- * Club domestic league appearances and goals

John Christian Galliquio Castro (born 1 December 1979) is a retired Peruvian footballer. He was a centre-back. He was called to play for the Peru national football team for the 2007 Copa América, where he played 4 games with a regular performance.

Galliquio has made 41 appearances for the Peru national football team scoring one goal.

== Club career ==
Galliquio began his career as a youth player for local club Deportivo Radioloros in 1994. Then he would have spells playing for other Pisco-based clubs until arriving at Ica to play for Estudiantes de Medicina, where he played in the Copa Perú division. His performances in the Copa Perú convinced Universitario de Deportes to sign him and then loan him out to their farm team, América Cochahuayco. There he participated in the 1999 Segunda División Peruana season.

Galliquio returned to Universitario for 2000 season. He made his league debut in the Descentralizado on 6 February 2000 under the manager Roberto Challe in a 0–0 draw against FBC Melgar for the Apertura.

== Career statistics ==
| # | Date | Venue | Opponent | Score | Result | Competition |
|---|---|---|---|---|---|---|
| 1 | 21 March 2012 | Arica | Chile | 1–1 | 1–3 | Friendly |

== Honours ==
América Cochahuayco

- Segunda División Peruana: 1999

Universitario de Deportes

- Peruvian Primera División: 2000, 2009, 2013

Sporting Cristal

- Peruvian Primera División: 2005

FBC Melgar

- Peruvian Primera División: 2015
