= Víctor Ferreira (footballer) =

Paraguayan footballer (born 1986)

Personal information
- Full name: Víctor Ramón Ferreira Barrios
- Date of birth: 9 May 1986 (age 40)
- Place of birth: Pedro Juan Caballero, Paraguay
- Height: 1.79 m (5 ft 10 in)
- Positions: Forward; winger

Senior career*
Years	Team	Apps	(Gls)
2006–2009	Cerro Porteño	80	(12)
2008	→ Godoy Cruz (loan)	6	(0)
2010	Guaraní	7	(0)
2010	Cerro Porteño	2	(0)
2011	Sol de América	37	(5)
2011–2012	Caracas	16	(4)
2012	Unión La Calera	13	(0)
2013–2015	Real Garcilaso	82	(22)
2015	Ayacucho FC	16	(1)
2016	Sport Huancayo	17	(3)
2018	Binacional	29	(8)
2019	General Díaz	3	(1)
Total		308	(56)

Managerial career
- 2021: General Díaz
- * Club domestic league appearances and goals

Víctor Ramón Ferreira Barrios (born 9 May 1986) is a former Paraguayan footballer who played as a forward.

In 2008 Ferreira played on loan for Godoy Cruz in Argentina.

== Teams ==
- Cerro Porteño 2006–2008
- Godoy Cruz de Mendoza 2008
- Cerro Porteño 2009
- Guaraní 2010
- Cerro Porteño 2010
- Sol de América 2011
- Caracas F.C. 2012
- Unión La Calera 2012
- Real Garcilaso 2013–2015
- Ayacucho FC 2015

== Titles ==
- Cerro Porteño 2006 (Torneo Clausura Paraguayan Primera División Championship), 2009 (Torneo Apertura Paraguayan Primera División Championship)
- Guaraní 2010 (Torneo Apertura Paraguayan Primera División Championship)
