= Octavio Vidales =

Peruvian footballer (born 1965)

Personal information
- Date of birth: 2 April 1965 (age 61)

International career
Years	Team	Apps	(Gls)
1989–1991	Peru	4	(0)

Octavio Vidales (born 2 April 1965) is a former Peruvian footballer who played as a defender.

== Club career ==
He played for Universitario in the Peruvian league from 1990 until 1992.

== International ==
Vidales played in four matches for the Peru national football team from 1989 to 1991. He was also part of Peru's squad for the 1991 Copa América tournament
