= Ricardo Ronceros =

Peruvian footballer (born 1977)

Personal information
- Full name: Ricardo Antonio Ronceros Ramos
- Date of birth: 20 July 1977 (age 49)
- Place of birth: Lima, Peru
- Height: 1.80 m (5 ft 11 in)
- Position: Centre back

Youth career
- Universitario

Senior career*
Years	Team	Apps	(Gls)
–1996	U América		
1997	Alcides Vigo		
1998	Unión Huaral		
1999	Alcides Vigo		
2000	Deportivo UPAO		
2001	Coopsol Trujillo		
2002–2003	Villa del Mar		
2004	Unión Huaral		
2005	Sport Boys		
2006	Deportivo Aviación		
2007	Univ. César Vallejo		
2008–2009	José Gálvez	82	(5)
2010	Cienciano	18	(2)
2010	Melgar	13	(0)
2011	José Gálvez	16	(3)
2012–2013	UTC	36	(4)
2014	Los Caimanes	35	(3)
2015–	Sport Huancayo	11	(1)
2015–	Cultural Santa Rosa		
- * Club domestic league appearances and goals as of 27 July 2012

Ricardo Antonio Ronceros Ramos (born 20 July 1977) is a Peruvian former professional footballer who played as a centre back.

== Career ==
Ronceros played in the youth teams of Universitario de Deportes and then played for their farm team U América FC.

He then had his first chance to play in the Torneo Descentralizado in the 1997 season with Alcides Vigo.

== Honours ==
José Gálvez

- Torneo Intermedio: 2011
- Segunda División: 2011
