= Club Universitario de Deportes–Sporting Cristal rivalry =

Football rivalry in Peru

Universitario–Sporting Cristal rivalry
- Location: Lima, Peru
- Teams: Sporting Cristal, Universitario
- First meeting: 30 September 1956, Universitario 2-2 Cristal
- Latest meeting: 26 July 2017, Cristal 1–1 Universitario

Statistics
- Total meetings: 203
- All-time series: Universitario:74; Draws:65; Cristal:64
- Largest victory: Cristal 4:0 Universitario (1988, 2003, y 2013) Primera División; Universitario 4:0 Cristal (1989) Copa Libertadores

The Universitario–Sporting Cristal rivalry is a major rivalry in Peruvian football. Both clubs have been very successful in the Torneo Decentralizado, with a combined total of 44 league titles since the expansion of the competition in 1966.

Clashes between the two teams tend to generate large amounts of excitement, due to the stature of both clubs and the high quality of football on display. From the first classic played in 1956, which ended tied 2–2 with goals from Daniel Ruiz twice to the cream while Roberto Martinez and Enrique Vargas scored for the celestial, the two clubs have met in 196 opportunities in official meetings, Universitario has achieved 74 victories, while Sporting Cristal has 64 wins.

== Rivalry ==
One of the main reasons for the enmity between the two clubs is due to a series of transfers of footballers emblematic Universitario to Sporting Cristal, starting in the year of 1959 with the signing of Alberto Terry and subsequently signings Héctor Chumpitaz, Eleazar Soria, Percy Rojas, Héctor Bailetti, Juan Carlos Oblitas and Oswaldo Ramírez in 1977. Another cause of this great rivalry between cream and celestial is the amount of international participation that both clubs have been in official tournaments organized by the Confederación Sudamericana de Fútbol, where Universitario Peruvian all over disputed continental cups, with 38 occasions, followed by Sporting Cristal with 33 occasions. To this should be added the popularity of both clubs, as several polls put both teams in the top of preferences along with Alianza Lima.

== General statistics ==
=== Last 10 matches ===
Season	Local	Visitor	Result
Descentralizado 2010	Sporting Cristal	Universitario	1:2
Descentralizado 2010	Sporting Cristal	Universitario	0:0
Descentralizado 2011	Universitario	Sporting Cristal	1:1
Descentralizado 2011	Sporting Cristal	Universitario	0:0
Descentralizado 2011	Universitario	Sporting Cristal	1:2
Descentralizado 2012	Sporting Cristal	Universitario	1:1
Descentralizado 2012	Universitario	Sporting Cristal	0:2
Descentralizado 2012	Sporting Cristal	Universitario	1:1
Descentralizado 2012	Universitario	Sporting Cristal	0:3
Descentralizado 2013	Sporting Cristal	Universitario	4:0

Matches Played:

- Clássic played: 196 clássic.
- Clássic earned by: Sporting Cristal: 62 clássic.
- Clássic earned by: Universitario: 72 clássic.
- Clássic draw: 63 clássic.
- Goals scored by: Sporting Cristal in the clássic: 251 goals.
- Goals scored by: Universitario in the clássic: 248 goals.
- High scoring in classic: 4–0 to favor of Sporting Cristal in 1988, 2003 and 2013, Universitario same score in 1989.

== See also ==
- Sporting Cristal
- Club Universitario de Deportes
- Peruvian Primera División
- Football rivalries in Peru
