= 2025 Liga 1 (Peru) =

Liga 1
- Season: 2025
- Dates: 7 February – 14 December 2025
- Champions: Universitario (29th title)
- Relegated: Ayacucho; Alianza Universidad; Binacional (disqualified)
- Copa Libertadores: Universitario; Cusco; Sporting Cristal; Alianza Lima
- Copa Sudamericana: Alianza Atlético; Melgar; Deportivo Garcilaso; Cienciano
- Matches: 332
- Goals: 864 (2.6 per match)
- Top goalscorer: Facundo Callejo (25 goals)
- Biggest home win: Universitario 6–0 UTC (27 April)
- Biggest away win: UTC 0–4 Binacional (15 February); Comerciantes Unidos 0–4 Sport Boys (13 April)
- Highest scoring: ADT 4–3 Atlético Grau (15 February); Cienciano 6–1 UTC (24 May); Alianza Lima 3–4 Dep. Garcilaso (13 September); Melgar 6–1 Los Chankas (21 September); Sport Huancayo 5–2 Cienciano (21 September)

The 2025 Liga 1 de Fútbol Profesional (known as the Liga 1 Te Apuesto 2025 for sponsorship reasons) was the 109th season of the Peruvian Primera División, the highest division of Peruvian football. The season began on 7 February and ended on 14 December 2025. The fixture for the season was drawn on 14 January 2025.

The defending champions Universitario won their twenty-ninth league title and third in a row by winning both the Apertura and Clausura tournaments, clinching the national title after defeating ADT 2–1 on 26 October.

On 19 August 2025, the Peruvian Football Federation officially announced the disqualification of Binacional from Liga 1 and the 2025 Torneo Juvenil Sub-18, following a court ruling that annulled the injunction which had allowed the club to return to the first division after its relegation in 2023. In its statement, the FPF stated that the Juliaca-based team would be informed about its participation in future tournaments in due course. Aside from Binacional, Ayacucho and Alianza Universidad were both relegated to Liga 2 on sporting performance at the end of the season.

== Teams ==
Initially, 17 teams were to take part in the league in this season: the top 15 teams from the 2024 season, plus the 2024 Liga 2 champions Alianza Universidad and runner-up Juan Pablo II College. Juan Pablo II College got promoted for the first time in their history while Alianza Universidad appeared for the first time since 2020. However, Ayacucho and Binacional were both reinstated in the league after winning judicial cases against the Peruvian Football Federation, which increased the number of teams to 19. The promoted teams replaced Carlos A. Mannucci, Universidad César Vallejo and Unión Comercio, who were relegated at the end of the previous season.

=== Team changes ===
Promoted from 2024 Liga 2	Relegated from 2024 Liga 1	Reinstated by judicial rulings
▲ Alianza Universidad (1st) ▲ Juan Pablo II College (2nd)	▼ Carlos A. Mannucci (16th) ▼ Universidad César Vallejo (17th) ▼ Unión Comercio (18th)	▲ Ayacucho ▲ Binacional

=== Stadia and locations ===
Locations of the 2025 Liga 1 teams
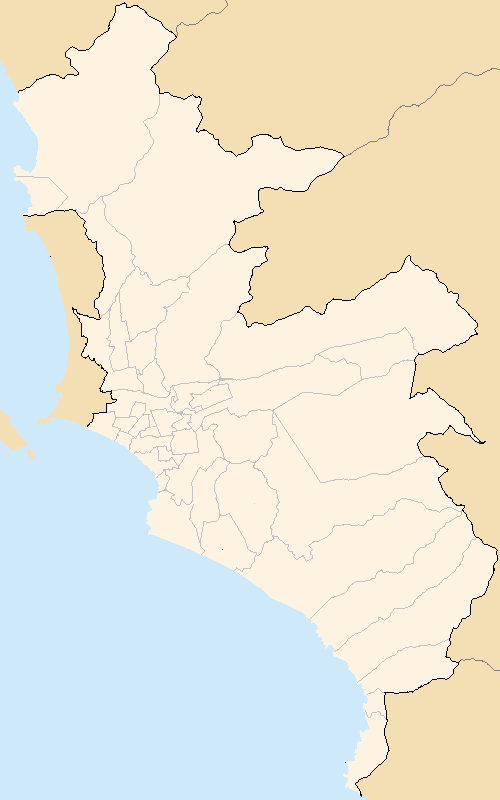
Locations of the 2025 Liga 1 teams – Lima.

Team	City	Stadium	Capacity
ADT	Tarma	Unión Tarma	9,100
Alianza Atlético	Sullana	Campeones del 36	12,000
Alianza Lima	Lima	Alejandro Villanueva	35,938
Alianza Universidad	Huánuco	Heraclio Tapia	25,036
Atlético Grau	Sullana (Note: For this season, Atlético Grau moved from Bernal to Sullana as their regular stadium Estadio Municipal de Bernal did not meet FPF requirements.)	Campeones del 36	12,000
Ayacucho	Ayacucho (Note: For this season, Ayacucho moved from Ayacucho to Estadio Municipal Manuel Eloy Molina Robles in Huanta as their regular stadium Estadio Ciudad de Cumaná was being renovated. For the Torneo Clausura, they moved their home matches to Estadio Las Américas in San Juan Bautista District.)	Las Américas	6,400
Binacional	Juliaca	Guillermo Briceño Rosamedina	20,080
Cienciano	Cusco	Garcilaso	45,056
Comerciantes Unidos	Cutervo	Juan Maldonado Gamarra (Note: Comerciantes Unidos played their Torneo Apertura home matches at Estadio Germán Contreras Jara in Cajabamba since Estadio Juan Maldonado Gamarra did not meet FPF requirements.)	13,680
Cusco	Cusco	Garcilaso	45,056
Deportivo Garcilaso	Cusco	Garcilaso	45,056
Juan Pablo II College	Chongoyape	Complejo Juan Pablo II (Note: Juan Pablo II College played one match at Estadio Mansiche in Trujillo, moving back to Chongoyape once their sports complex met FPF requirements to host Liga 1 matches.)	3,000
Los Chankas	Andahuaylas	Los Chankas	10,000
Melgar	Arequipa	Virgen de Chapi	40,370
Sport Boys	Callao	Miguel Grau	17,000
Sport Huancayo	Huancayo	Huancayo	20,000
Sporting Cristal	Lima	Alberto Gallardo	11,600
Universitario	Lima	Monumental	80,093
UTC	Cajabamba (Note: For this season, UTC moved from Cajamarca to Cajabamba as their regular stadium Estadio Héroes de San Ramón did not meet FPF requirements.)	Germán Contreras Jara	6,300

=== Personnel and kits ===
Team	Manager	Kit manufacturer	Main shirt sponsors
ADT	(Argentina) Horacio Melgarejo	New Athletic	Caja Huancayo
Alianza Atlético	(Argentina) Gerardo Ameli	Walon	
Alianza Lima	(Argentina) Néstor Gorosito	Nike	Apuesta Total, Caja Huancayo
Alianza Universidad	(Peru) Roberto Mosquera	Performance	UDH
Atlético Grau	(Argentina) Ángel Comizzo	Walon	Caja Piura
Ayacucho	(Argentina) Sergio Castellanos	Real Sport	Ayacucho, Caja Municipal de Ica
~~Binacional~~	(Peru) ~~Claudio Bustamante~~	~~Urzu Athletic~~	~~DoradoBet~~
Cienciano	(Argentina) Carlos Desio	Umbro	Caja Cusco, DoradoBet
Comerciantes Unidos	(Argentina) Claudio Biaggio	Real Sport	
Cusco	(Argentina) Miguel Rondelli	Adidas	DoradoBet
Deportivo Garcilaso	(Argentina) Carlos Bustos	Ander Sport	Caja Cusco
Juan Pablo II College	(Peru) Santiago Acasiete	Real Sport	
Los Chankas	(Argentina) Walter Paolella	New Athletic	Cerveza Apurimeña
Melgar	(Peru) Juan Reynoso	Walon	Stake
Sport Boys	(Peru) Juan Carlos Cabanillas	Astro	Apuesta Total
Sport Huancayo	(Uruguay) Richard Pellejero	Lotto	Caja Huancayo
Sporting Cristal	(Brazil) Paulo Autuori	Puma	Caja Piura, DoradoBet
Universitario	(Uruguay) Jorge Fossati	Marathon	Apuesta Total
UTC	(Argentina) Hernán Lisi	Astro	Tinbet

=== Managerial changes ===
Team	Outgoing manager	Manner of departure	Date of vacancy	Position in table	Incoming manager	Date of appointment
Torneo Apertura
Binacional	(Peru) Luis Flores	End of contract	10 September 2024	Pre-season	(Peru) Erick Torres	16 January 2025
Sport Huancayo	(Peru) Franco Navarro	End of contract	2 November 2024	Pre-season	(Uruguay) Richard Pellejero	20 December 2024
UTC	(Uruguay) Guillermo Sanguinetti	End of contract	2 November 2024	Pre-season	(Colombia) Hernán Darío Gómez	29 November 2024
Los Chankas	(Argentina) César Vaioli	End of caretaker spell	3 November 2024	Pre-season	(Argentina) Jorge Vivaldo	25 November 2024
Melgar	(Peru) Marco Valencia	Return to the youth setup	7 November 2024	Pre-season	(Argentina) Walter Ribonetto	11 November 2024
Alianza Lima	(Argentina) Mariano Soso	Mutual agreement	21 November 2024	Pre-season	(Argentina) Néstor Gorosito	4 December 2024
Comerciantes Unidos	(Peru) Carlos Silvestri	Mutual agreement	21 November 2024	Pre-season	(Argentina) Martín Cardetti	19 December 2024
Ayacucho	(Argentina) José Collatti	Replaced	3 December 2024	Pre-season	(Colombia) Édgar Ospina	3 December 2024
ADT	(Argentina) Claudio Biaggio	End of contract	25 December 2024	Pre-season	(Argentina) Carlos Desio	25 December 2024
UTC	(Colombia) Hernán Darío Gómez	Signed by El Salvador	24 February 2025	19th	(Uruguay) Pablo Bossi	25 February 2025
Binacional	(Peru) Erick Torres	Sacked	5 April 2025	11th	(Peru) César Chávez-Riva (Note: Caretaker manager.)	5 April 2025
Sporting Cristal	(Argentina) Guillermo Farré	Sacked	10 April 2025	6th	(Peru) Jorge Soto	10 April 2025
Cienciano	(Argentina) Christian Díaz	Resigned	13 April 2025	15th	(Argentina) Carlos Desio	17 April 2025
Universitario	(Argentina) Fabián Bustos	Signed by Olimpia	14 April 2025	2nd	(Peru) Manuel Barreto (Peru) Piero Alva (Note: Caretaker managers.)	14 April 2025
Los Chankas	(Argentina) Jorge Vivaldo	Sacked	14 April 2025	14th	(Argentina) César Vaioli	15 April 2025
Comerciantes Unidos	(Argentina) Martín Cardetti	Sacked	15 April 2025	16th	(Peru) Javier Arce	15 April 2025
ADT	(Argentina) Carlos Desio	Resigned	16 April 2025	7th	(Peru) Leonardo Rojas (Note: Originally as caretaker manager, appointed on a permanent basis on 24 April 2025.)	16 April 2025
Sporting Cristal	(Peru) Jorge Soto	End of caretaker spell	19 April 2025	6th	(Brazil) Paulo Autuori	16 April 2025
Binacional	(Peru) César Chávez-Riva	End of caretaker spell	21 April 2025	12th	(Peru) Claudio Bustamante	21 April 2025
Universitario	(Peru) Manuel Barreto (Peru) Piero Alva	End of caretaker spell	22 April 2025	1st	(Uruguay) Jorge Fossati	20 April 2025
Ayacucho	(Colombia) Édgar Ospina	Mutual agreement	4 May 2025	18th	(Argentina) Luis Islas	6 May 2025
Alianza Universidad	(Peru) Paul Cominges	Mutual agreement	4 May 2025	19th	(Peru) Mifflin Bermúdez	6 May 2025
Sport Boys	(Argentina) Cristian Paulucci	Resigned	12 May 2025	10th	(Peru) Guillermo Vásquez	12 May 2025
Sport Boys	(Peru) Guillermo Vásquez	End of caretaker spell	24 May 2025	11th	(Colombia) Arturo Reyes	24 May 2025
Comerciantes Unidos	(Peru) Javier Arce	Signed by Deportivo Coopsol	11 June 2025	18th	(Argentina) Daniel Ferreyra	11 June 2025
Los Chankas	(Argentina) César Vaioli	Mutual agreement	17 June 2025	13th	(Argentina) Walter Paolella (Note: Originally as caretaker manager, appointed on a permanent basis on 18 July 2025.)	19 June 2025
ADT	(Peru) Leonardo Rojas	Mutual agreement	24 June 2025	12th	(Peru) Orlando Romero	28 June 2025
Ayacucho	(Argentina) Luis Islas	Mutual agreement	30 June 2025	18th	(Peru) Gino Reyes (Peru) Jhon Alcántara	30 June 2025
Deportivo Garcilaso	(Argentina) Guillermo Duró	Mutual agreement	8 July 2025	8th	(Argentina) Carlos Bustos	11 July 2025
Ayacucho	(Peru) Gino Reyes (Peru) Jhon Alcántara	End of caretaker spell	10 July 2025	17th	(Argentina) Sergio Castellanos	10 July 2025
ADT	(Peru) Orlando Romero	End of caretaker spell	10 July 2025	9th	(Argentina) Horacio Melgarejo	10 July 2025
Torneo Clausura
Alianza Universidad	(Peru) Mifflin Bermúdez	Mutual agreement	26 July 2025	18th	(Peru) Roberto Mosquera	27 July 2025
Melgar	(Argentina) Walter Ribonetto	Mutual agreement	27 July 2025	10th	(Peru) Víctor Balta	27 July 2025
Comerciantes Unidos	(Argentina) Daniel Ferreyra	Mutual agreement	4 August 2025	19th	(Argentina) Claudio Biaggio	5 August 2025
Melgar	(Peru) Víctor Balta	End of caretaker spell	10 August 2025	12th	(Peru) Juan Reynoso	5 August 2025
Sport Boys	(Colombia) Arturo Reyes	Sacked	11 August 2025	17th	(Peru) Guillermo Vásquez	11 August 2025
UTC	(Uruguay) Pablo Bossi	Sacked	12 August 2025	19th	(Argentina) Hernán Lisi	14 August 2025
Sport Boys	(Peru) Guillermo Vásquez	End of caretaker spell	27 August 2025	17th	(Peru) Juan Carlos Cabanillas	27 August 2025

== Torneo Apertura ==
=== Standings ===
Pos	Team	Pld	W	D	L	GF	GA	GD	Pts	Qualification
1	Universitario	18	12	3	3	38	12	+26	39	Advance to the Playoffs
2	Alianza Lima	18	11	4	3	23	11	+12	37	
3	Cusco	18	10	4	4	34	20	+14	34	
4	Alianza Atlético	18	11	1	6	28	18	+10	34	
5	Sporting Cristal	18	10	2	6	31	24	+7	32	
6	Melgar	18	8	7	3	28	20	+8	31	
7	Sport Huancayo	18	9	3	6	23	21	+2	30	
8	Deportivo Garcilaso	18	8	3	7	28	19	+9	27	
9	ADT	18	6	6	6	24	30	−6	24	
10	Cienciano	18	5	8	5	29	25	+4	23	
11	Los Chankas	18	5	8	5	24	25	−1	23	
12	Atlético Grau	18	5	7	6	23	24	−1	22	
13	Sport Boys	18	5	5	8	26	28	−2	20	
14	Juan Pablo II College	18	5	4	9	20	28	−8	19	
15	UTC	18	5	4	9	17	34	−17	19	
16	Binacional	18	4	6	8	20	33	−13	18	
17	Ayacucho	18	4	3	11	14	27	−13	15	
18	Comerciantes Unidos	18	2	5	11	17	31	−14	11	
19	Alianza Universidad	18	2	5	11	16	33	−17	11	

Source: Liga 1, Soccerway
Rules for classification: 1) Points; 2) Goal difference; 3) Goals for; 4) Fair play points; 5) Drawing of lots.

=== Results ===
Home \ Away	ADT	AAS	ALI	AUH	CAG	AYA	BIN	CIE	COM	CUS	GAR	JPA	CHA	MEL	SBA	SHU	CRI	UNI	UTC
ADT			3–0		4–3	0–1	1–1		1–0	2–1	0–0	2–2			2–2				
Alianza Atlético	2–0		3–1		2–1		4–1		3–0	2–4	1–0				1–0		1–0		
Alianza Lima				2–0		2–0	5–1	0–1		3–0		1–0	1–0			0–0		1–1	
Alianza Universidad	2–3	2–0			0–0				0–2		0–0			1–1		0–1	2–2		1–2
Atlético Grau			1–1			1–0	3–0	1–1		0–0		2–0	2–1		3–3			0–2	
Ayacucho		0–2		3–2				1–0					1–2	2–3		1–1	1–4	0–1	0–1
Binacional				1–1		1–1		1–1		1–2		2–0	1–2	1–1		1–0		1–3	
Cienciano	2–2	3–2		0–1					3–2		2–3			1–2		2–1	1–1		6–1
Comerciantes Unidos			0–1		2–2	0–1	1–1			1–2		3–0	1–1		0–4			1–1	
Cusco				4–1		3–0		0–0				4–2	3–3	0–1		3–0		2–0	1–1
Deportivo Garcilaso			0–1		2–0	2–1	0–1		2–1	1–3		4–0			4–0			0–1	
Juan Pablo II College		1–0		1–0		0–0		2–2					3–0	1–1		0–1		2–0	4–2
Los Chankas	1–1	1–2		3–1				0–0			2–2			1–1		1–3	3–1		2–1
Melgar	4–0	2–1	0–1		1–1				1–1		1–2				2–1		1–0		3–0
Sport Boys			0–1	4–2		2–1	3–1	2–2		1–2		1–0	1–1					0–2	
Sport Huancayo	2–1	2–1			3–0				4–2		0–3			2–2	1–0		0–1		1–0
Sporting Cristal	2–1		1–2		2–1		5–0		2–0	1–0	3–2	3–2			2–1				
Universitario	5–0	0–1		4–0				3–2					0–0	4–1		3–1	2–0		6–0
UTC	0–1	0–0	0–0		0–2		0–4		2–0		2–1				1–1		4–1		

Source: Liga 1, Soccerway
Legend: Blue = home team win; Yellow = draw; Red = away team win.

== Torneo Clausura ==
=== Standings ===
Pos	Team	Pld	W	D	L	GF	GA	GD	Pts	Qualification
1	Universitario	17	12	4	1	29	13	+16	40	Advance to the Playoffs
2	Cusco	17	11	3	3	29	15	+14	36	
3	Sporting Cristal	17	9	4	4	29	13	+16	31	
4	Alianza Lima	17	9	4	4	30	19	+11	31	
5	Cienciano	17	8	3	6	25	21	+4	27	
6	Los Chankas	17	9	0	8	21	28	−7	27	
7	Comerciantes Unidos	17	7	5	5	20	21	−1	26	
8	Melgar	17	6	7	4	24	17	+7	25	
9	Deportivo Garcilaso	17	6	7	4	20	21	−1	25	
10	ADT	17	7	4	6	19	20	−1	25	
11	Alianza Atlético	17	6	5	6	15	12	+3	23	
12	Sport Huancayo	17	5	3	9	28	28	0	18	
13	Alianza Universidad	17	5	2	10	23	33	−10	17	
14	Atlético Grau	17	4	4	9	19	24	−5	16	
15	Sport Boys	17	4	4	9	14	25	−11	16	
16	Juan Pablo II College	17	3	5	9	13	23	−10	14	
17	Ayacucho	17	4	2	11	16	29	−13	14	
18	UTC	17	3	4	10	16	28	−12	13	
19	Binacional (D)	0	0	0	0	0	0	0	0	Disqualified from the competition (Note: Binacional were disqualified from the competition by the Peruvian Football Federation on 19 August 2025. According to competition regulations, matches played by the team in the Torneo Clausura until then were annulled, and those still to be played were cancelled.)

Source: Liga 1, Soccerway
Rules for classification: 1) Points; 2) Goal difference; 3) Goals for; 4) Fair play points; 5) Drawing of lots.
(D) Disqualified

=== Results ===
Home \ Away	ADT	AAS	ALI	AUH	CAG	AYA	BIN	CIE	COM	CUS	GAR	JPA	CHA	MEL	SBA	SHU	CRI	UNI	UTC
ADT		1–0		0–3				1–0					1–0	2–2		1–0	3–2	1–2	3–1
Alianza Atlético				2–1		3–0		0–1				0–1	1–0	0–0		0–0		0–2	2–0
Alianza Lima	3–1	1–1			2–1				4–0		3–4			2–2	3–1		0–0		3–0
Alianza Universidad			2–1			1–2		0–3		2–2		3–0	2–1		2–3			0–2	
Atlético Grau	2–0	1–1		2–0					1–2		1–1			0–0		3–1	1–2		0–2
Ayacucho	2–2		0–1		1–2				0–3 (Note: The Ayacucho vs. Comerciantes Unidos match was abandoned at stoppage time with the former side leading 1–0 due to disturbances by Ayacucho fans. On 20 November 2025, the Peruvian Football Federation awarded the match as a 3–0 victory for Comerciantes Unidos.)	0–1	4–2	2–1			0–0				
Binacional		~~2–0~~															~~1–3~~		~~0–0~~
Cienciano			2–1		1–0	2–1				1–2		2–1	3–0		2–2			1–1	
Comerciantes Unidos	0–0	1–0		1–2				1–1			0–0			1–1		2–0	1–4		2–1
Cusco	0–2	1–0	2–0		1–0		~~2–0~~		1–1		4–0				3–0		3–2		
Deportivo Garcilaso	1–0	2–4		1–1				2–1					3–0	1–1		1–1	0–1		0–0
Juan Pablo II College	1–1		1–2		3–1		~~0–0~~		0–1	0–0	0–1				3–0		0–0		
Los Chankas			1–2		3–2	1–0			3–2	2–1		1–0			2–1			3–1	
Melgar				2–1		2–1		2–0		0–2		1–1	6–1			2–0		1–2	
Sport Boys	1–0	0–1			1–1				0–1		0–1			1–0		2–1	0–2		2–2
Sport Huancayo			1–2	5–1		3–1		5–2		1–2		5–1	1–2					1–1	
Sporting Cristal		0–0		3–0		3–0		2–1					0–1	1–0		5–0		0–1	2–2
Universitario			0–0		3–1	2–1			3–1	3–2	0–0	3–0			1–0				
UTC				3–2		0–1		0–2		1–2		0–0	2–0	1–2		0–3		1–2	

Source: Liga 1, Soccerway
Legend: Blue = home team win; Yellow = draw; Red = away team win.

== Aggregate table ==
Pos	Team	Pld	W	D	L	GF	GA	GD	Pts	Qualification
1	Universitario (C)	35	24	7	4	67	25	+42	79	Qualification for Copa Libertadores group stage
2	Cusco	35	21	7	7	63	35	+28	70	Advance to Playoffs and qualification for Copa Libertadores group stage
3	Alianza Lima	35	20	8	7	53	30	+23	68	Advance to Playoffs and qualification for Copa Libertadores first stage
4	Sporting Cristal	35	19	6	10	60	37	+23	63	Advance to Playoffs and qualification for Copa Libertadores second stage
5	Alianza Atlético	35	17	6	12	43	30	+13	57	Qualification for Copa Sudamericana first stage
6	Melgar	35	14	14	7	52	37	+15	56	Qualification for Copa Sudamericana first stage
7	Deportivo Garcilaso	35	14	10	11	48	40	+8	52	Qualification for Copa Sudamericana first stage
8	Cienciano	35	13	11	11	54	46	+8	50	Qualification for Copa Sudamericana first stage
9	Los Chankas	35	14	8	13	45	53	−8	50	
10	ADT	35	13	10	12	43	50	−7	49	
11	Sport Huancayo	35	14	6	15	51	49	+2	48	
12	Atlético Grau	35	9	11	15	42	48	−6	38	
13	Comerciantes Unidos	35	9	10	16	37	52	−15	37	
14	Sport Boys	35	9	9	17	40	53	−13	36	
15	Juan Pablo II College	35	8	9	18	33	51	−18	33	
16	UTC	35	8	8	19	33	62	−29	32	
17	Ayacucho (R)	35	8	5	22	30	56	−26	29	Relegation to Liga 2
18	Alianza Universidad (R)	35	7	7	21	39	66	−27	28	Relegation to Liga 2
19	Binacional (D, R)	18	4	6	8	20	33	−13	18	Disqualified from the competition, relegated (Note: Binacional were disqualified from the competition by the Peruvian Football Federation on 19 August 2025. According to competition regulations, matches played by the team in the Torneo Clausura until then were annulled, those still to be played were cancelled, and the team placed last in the aggregate table.)

Source: Liga 1
Rules for classification: 1) Points; 2) Goal difference; 3) Goals for; 4) Head-to-head points; 5) Head-to-head goal difference; 6) Head-to-head goals for; 7) Fair play points; 8) Drawing of lots.
(C) Champions; (D) Disqualified; (R) Relegated

== Playoffs ==
The playoffs to decide the Liga 1 champion were set to be contested by the winners of the Apertura and Clausura tournaments as well as the top two teams in the season's aggregate table (other than the tournament winners). Since Universitario won both the Apertura and Clausura tournaments, they were crowned as league champions without playing this stage and the playoffs were instead held to decide the season's runner-up as well as the final positions of the remaining Copa Libertadores qualifiers, being played by the next best three teams in the aggregate table. Cusco, as the team placing second in the aggregate table, received a bye to the second stage, while the other two playoff qualifiers (Alianza Lima and Sporting Cristal) entered the first stage.

The Stage 2 winner qualified for the Copa Libertadores group stage, while the Stage 2 loser qualified for the Copa Libertadores second stage and the Stage 1 loser entered the Copa Libertadores first stage.

Stage 1				Stage 2
Sporting Cristal (p)	1	3	4 (5)
Alianza Lima	1	3	4 (4)
Alianza Lima	1	3	4 (4)	Sporting Cristal	1	0	1
				Cusco	0	2	2

=== Stage 1 ===
2 December 2025
20:00 UTC−5

Sporting Cristal	1–1	Alianza Lima
Távara 68' (pen.)	Report	Barcos 82'

Estadio Nacional, Lima
Referee: Micke Palomino

6 December 2025
20:00 UTC−5

Alianza Lima	3–3	Sporting Cristal
E. Castillo 16', 27'; Guerrero 45+1'	Report	Távara 7' (pen.), 82', 90+1'
Penalties
Peña (penalty missed); E. Castillo (penalty scored); Trauco (penalty scored); Lavandeira (penalty scored); Barcos (penalty scored)	4–5	(penalty scored) Távara; (penalty scored) Benavente; (penalty scored) Ávila; (penalty scored) Pasquini; (penalty scored) Pacheco

Estadio Alejandro Villanueva, Lima
Referee: Kevin Ortega

Tied 4–4 on aggregate. Sporting Cristal won on penalties.

=== Stage 2 ===
10 December 2025
20:00 UTC−5

Sporting Cristal	1–0	Cusco
González 15'	Report

Estadio Nacional, Lima
Referee: Augusto Menéndez

14 December 2025
18:00 UTC−5

Cusco	2–0	Sporting Cristal
Colman 37' (pen.); Callejo 56'	Report

Estadio Garcilaso, Cusco
Referee: Bruno Pérez

Cusco won 2–1 on aggregate.

== Top scorers ==
Rank	Player	Club	Goals
1	(Argentina) Facundo Callejo	Cusco	25
2	(Peru) Jhonny Vidales	ADT / Melgar	19
3	(Colombia) Jarlín Quintero	UTC	16
3	(Peru) Alex Valera	Universitario	16
5	(Argentina) Pablo Erustes	Deportivo Garcilaso	15
5	(Peru) Paolo Guerrero	Alianza Lima	15
7	(Argentina) Agustín Graneros	Alianza Atlético	14
7	(Argentina) Matías Sen	Comerciantes Unidos	14
7	(Colombia) Yorleys Mena	Alianza Universidad	14
7	(Peru) Alejandro Hohberg	Sport Boys / Cienciano	14

Source: Ovación

== Attendances ==
The average league attendance was 6,809.

#	Club	Home games	Total	Average
1	Universitario	17	660,153	38,833
2	Alianza Lima	18	441,871	24,548
3	Sporting Cristal	18	180,240	10,013
4	Melgar	17	155,493	9,147
5	Cienciano	17	138,241	8,132
6	Sport Boys	18	122,851	6,825
7	Alianza Universidad	17	86,335	5,079
8	Deportivo Garcilaso	18	78,685	4,371
9	Cusco	17	45,562	2,680
10	Juan Pablo II	17	43,890	2,582
11	ADT	18	43,680	2,427
12	Los Chankas	17	41,698	2,453
13	Comerciantes Unidos	18	41,492	2,305
14	Alianza Atlético	18	36,550	2,031
15	Sport Huancayo	17	28,824	1,696
16	Ayacucho	17	25,824	1,519
17	Atlético Grau	18	23,538	1,308
18	UTC	18	11,064	615

Source: Infobae

== See also ==
- 2025 Liga 2
- 2025 Liga 3
- 2025 Copa Perú
- 2025 Ligas Departamentales del Perú
- 2025 Liga Femenina
- 2025 Torneo Juvenil Sub-18
