= 2023 Liga 1 (Peru) =

Liga 1
- Season: 2023
- Dates: 3 February – 8 November 2023
- Champions: Universitario (27th title)
- Relegated: Binacional; Deportivo Municipal; Academia Cantolao
- Copa Libertadores: Universitario; Alianza Lima; Sporting Cristal; Melgar
- Copa Sudamericana: Sport Huancayo; ADT; Deportivo Garcilaso; Universidad César Vallejo
- Matches: 336
- Goals: 849 (2.53 per match)
- Top goalscorer: Santiago Giordana (22 goals)
- Biggest home win: Melgar 5–0 Cantolao (29 April); Binacional 5–0 Unión Comercio (22 May); Alianza Lima 6–1 Binacional (28 May); Sporting Cristal 5–0 Binacional (27 July); U. César Vallejo 5–0 Atlético Grau (4 September)
- Biggest away win: Unión Comercio 1–6 Sporting Cristal (13 May)
- Highest scoring: Dep. Garcilaso 4–4 Sporting Cristal (12 March); Binacional 5–3 Sport Huancayo (16 April)

The 2023 Liga 1 de Fútbol Profesional (known as the Liga 1 Betsson 2023 for sponsorship reasons) was the 107th season of the Peruvian Primera División, the highest division of Peruvian football. A total of 19 teams competed in the season, which began on 3 February and ended on 8 November 2023. The season was originally scheduled to begin on 21 January, but the first two matchdays were postponed due to the 2022–2023 Peruvian protests. The fixtures for the season were announced on 30 December 2022.

Universitario were the champions, winning their twenty-seventh league title after defeating Alianza Lima in the two-legged final with a 3–1 aggregate score. Alianza Lima were the defending champions, having won back-to-back titles in 2021 and 2022.

== Teams ==
19 teams took part in the league in this season: the top 16 teams from the 2022 tournament, plus the 2022 Copa Perú champions Deportivo Garcilaso, the Liga 2 champions Cusco and Unión Comercio, the winners of the promotion/relegation play-off. The promoted teams replaced Ayacucho, Universidad San Martín and Carlos Stein, who were relegated at the end of the previous season.

=== Team changes ===
Promoted from 2022 Liga 2	Promoted from 2022 Copa Perú	Relegated from 2022 Liga 1
▲ Cusco (1st) ▲ Unión Comercio (2nd)	▲ Deportivo Garcilaso (1st)	▼ Ayacucho (17th) ▼ Universidad San Martín (18th) ▼ Carlos Stein (19th)

=== Stadia and locations ===
Locations of the 2023 Liga 1 teams
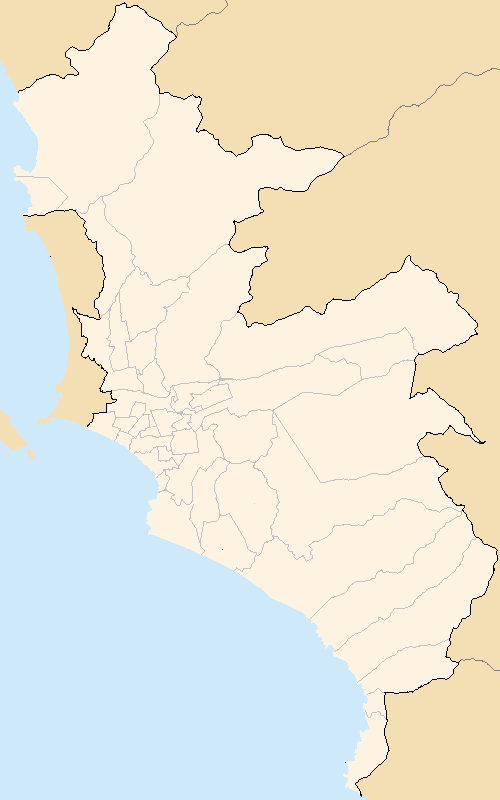
Locations of the 2023 Liga 1 teams – Lima.
Locations of the 2023 Liga 1 teams – Callao.

Team	City	Stadium	Capacity
Academia Cantolao	Callao	Miguel Grau	17,000
ADT	Tarma	Unión Tarma	9,100
Alianza Atlético	Sullana	Campeones del 36	12,000
Alianza Lima	Lima	Alejandro Villanueva	35,938
Atlético Grau	Bernal	Municipal de Bernal	7,000
Binacional	Juliaca	Guillermo Briceño Rosamedina	20,030
Carlos A. Mannucci	Trujillo	Mansiche	25,036
Cienciano	Cusco	Garcilaso	45,056
Cusco	Cusco	Garcilaso	45,056
Deportivo Garcilaso	Cusco	Garcilaso	45,056
Deportivo Municipal	Lima	Iván Elías Moreno	10,000
Melgar	Arequipa	Virgen de Chapi	40,370
Sport Boys	Callao	Miguel Grau	17,000
Sport Huancayo	Huancayo	Huancayo	20,000
Sporting Cristal	Lima	Alberto Gallardo	11,600
Unión Comercio	Tarapoto	Carlos Vidaurre García	18,000
Universidad César Vallejo	Trujillo	Mansiche	25,000
Universitario	Lima	Monumental	80,093
UTC	Cajamarca	Héroes de San Ramón	18,000

=== Personnel and kits ===
Team	Manager	Kit manufacturer	Shirt sponsor
Academia Cantolao	(Argentina) Adrián Taffarel	Loma's	Dafabet
ADT	(Peru) Franco Navarro	New Athletic	Caja Huancayo
Alianza Atlético	(Peru) Jorge Ágapo Gonzales	Walon	Caja Sullana, Coolbet
Alianza Lima	(Uruguay) Mauricio Larriera	Nike	Apuesta Total
Atlético Grau	(Argentina) Ángel Comizzo	Walon	DoradoBet, Caja Piura
Binacional	(Argentina) César Vaioli	New Athletic	
Carlos A. Mannucci	(Uruguay) Mario Viera	New Athletic	UPAO, DoradoBet
Cienciano	(Peru) Óscar Ibáñez	New Athletic	DoradoBet
Cusco	(Peru) Luis Flores	Lotto	Caja Cusco
Deportivo Garcilaso	(Argentina) Jorge Célico	Ander	Caja Cusco, Salkantay Trekking
Deportivo Municipal	(Peru) Santiago Acasiete	Walon	1XBET
Melgar	(Argentina) Mariano Soso	Walon	Betano
Sport Boys	(Argentina) Fernando Gamboa	Astro	Marcadores247.com
Sport Huancayo	(Peru) Wilmar Valencia	Lotto	Caja Huancayo
Sporting Cristal	(Brazil) Tiago Nunes	Adidas	Cerveza Cristal, Caja Piura
Unión Comercio	(Argentina) Marcelo Vivas	Convert	Olva Courier, Coolbet
Universidad César Vallejo	(Peru) Roberto Mosquera	Astro	UCV, Caja Trujillo
Universitario	(Uruguay) Jorge Fossati	Marathon	Apuesta Total
UTC	(Argentina) Carlos Ramacciotti	Lotto	Colegio Nivel A

=== Managerial changes ===
Team	Outgoing manager	Manner of departure	Date of vacancy	Position in table	Incoming manager	Date of appointment
Torneo Apertura
Universidad César Vallejo	(Peru) José del Solar	End of contract	29 October 2022	Pre-season	(Uruguay) Sebastián Abreu	17 November 2022
Cienciano	(Peru) Jesús Cisneros	End of caretaker spell	30 October 2022	Pre-season	(Colombia) Leonel Álvarez	9 December 2022
Carlos A. Mannucci	(Argentina) Jorge Pautasso	Mutual agreement	31 October 2022	Pre-season	(Uruguay) Mario Viera	5 November 2022
Alianza Atlético	(Uruguay) Mario Viera	End of contract	4 November 2022	Pre-season	(Argentina) Carlos Desio	7 November 2022
Sport Boys	(Peru) Juan Alayo	End of contract	4 November 2022	Pre-season	(Uruguay) Guillermo Sanguinetti	28 November 2022
Sporting Cristal	(Peru) Roberto Mosquera	End of contract	7 November 2022	Pre-season	(Brazil) Tiago Nunes	17 November 2022
Deportivo Municipal	(Peru) Juan Pajuelo	End of contract	8 November 2022	Pre-season	(Argentina) Ángel Comizzo	15 November 2022
Atlético Grau	(Argentina) Gustavo Álvarez	Resigned	11 November 2022	Pre-season	(Argentina) Daniel Ahmed	22 November 2022
Academia Cantolao	(Uruguay) Alejandro Apud	Signed by Plaza Colonia	3 December 2022	Pre-season	(Uruguay) Matías Rosa	5 December 2022
Universitario	(Argentina) Carlos Compagnucci	Resigned	28 February 2023	14th	(Peru) Jorge Araujo (Note: Caretaker manager.)	28 February 2023
Universitario	(Peru) Jorge Araujo	End of caretaker spell	5 March 2023	9th	(Uruguay) Jorge Fossati	3 March 2023
Melgar	(Argentina) Pablo Lavallén	Sacked	6 March 2023	18th	(Argentina) Mariano Soso (Note: Marco Valencia was the caretaker manager for the Torneo Apertura 9th round match against UTC.)	14 March 2023
Binacional	(Peru) Wilmar Valencia	Mutual agreement	15 March 2023	18th	(Peru) José Díaz	15 March 2023
Binacional	(Peru) José Díaz	End of caretaker spell	22 March 2023	19th	(Argentina) Darío Franco	22 March 2023
Unión Comercio	(Peru) Jesús Oropesa	Sacked	4 April 2023	13th	(Peru) Raymundo Paz	4 April 2023
Academia Cantolao	(Uruguay) Matías Rosa	Mutual agreement	12 April 2023	18th	(Peru) Ramón Perleche	12 April 2023
Unión Comercio	(Peru) Raymundo Paz	End of caretaker spell	14 April 2023	11th	(Colombia) Jaime de la Pava	14 April 2023
Deportivo Garcilaso	(Peru) Roberto Tristán	Sacked	16 April 2023	7th	(Argentina) Jorge Célico	20 April 2023
Academia Cantolao	(Peru) Ramón Perleche	End of caretaker spell	21 April 2023	19th	(Argentina) Edgardo Malvestiti	22 April 2023
Sport Huancayo	(Peru) Mifflin Bermúdez	Demoted to the reserve squad	29 April 2023	11th	(Peru) Wilmar Valencia	29 April 2023
Sport Boys	(Uruguay) Guillermo Sanguinetti	Mutual agreement	8 May 2023	18th	(Peru) Juan Alayo	8 May 2023
Alianza Atlético	(Argentina) Carlos Desio	Mutual agreement	11 May 2023	13th	(Peru) Jorge Ágapo Gonzales	11 May 2023
UTC	(Argentina) Marcelo Grioni	Mutual agreement	14 May 2023	15th	(Peru) José Infante	15 May 2023
Unión Comercio	(Colombia) Jaime de la Pava	Sacked	18 May 2023	16th	(Peru) Raymundo Paz	19 May 2023
Cienciano	(Colombia) Leonel Álvarez	Mutual agreement	19 May 2023	8th	(Peru) Alessandro Morán	20 May 2023
Binacional	(Argentina) Darío Franco	Mutual agreement	19 May 2023	17th	(Peru) Aristóteles Ramos	19 May 2023
Sport Boys	(Peru) Juan Alayo	End of caretaker spell	19 May 2023	18th	(Argentina) Fernando Gamboa	19 May 2023
Cienciano	(Peru) Alessandro Morán	End of caretaker spell	22 May 2023	9th	(Argentina) Gerardo Ameli	22 May 2023
UTC	(Peru) José Infante	End of caretaker spell	24 May 2023	13th	(Peru) Francisco Pizarro	24 May 2023
Unión Comercio	(Peru) Raymundo Paz	End of caretaker spell	28 May 2023	16th	(Venezuela) Daniel Farías	27 May 2023
Torneo Clausura
Deportivo Municipal	(Argentina) Ángel Comizzo	Resigned	13 June 2023	Pre-tournament	(Peru) Rafael Castillo	22 June 2023
Academia Cantolao	(Argentina) Edgardo Malvestiti	Sacked	13 June 2023	Pre-tournament	(Argentina) Adrián Taffarel	15 June 2023
Alianza Atlético	(Peru) Jorge Ágapo Gonzales	End of caretaker spell	14 June 2023	Pre-tournament	(Argentina) Carlos Compagnucci	14 June 2023
Binacional	(Peru) Aristóteles Ramos	End of caretaker spell	19 June 2023	Pre-tournament	(Argentina) Juan Manuel Azconzábal	19 June 2023
Unión Comercio	(Venezuela) Daniel Farías	Resigned	22 July 2023	19th	(Argentina) Marcelo Vivas	27 July 2023
Alianza Lima	(Peru) Guillermo Salas	Sacked	24 July 2023	8th	(Colombia) Nixon Perea	24 July 2023
UTC	(Peru) Francisco Pizarro	Mutual agreement	25 July 2023	16th	(Argentina) Carlos Ramacciotti	26 July 2023
Binacional	(Argentina) Juan Manuel Azconzábal	Mutual agreement	1 August 2023	18th	(Argentina) César Vaioli	5 August 2023
Atlético Grau	(Argentina) Daniel Ahmed	Sacked	2 August 2023	16th	(Argentina) Ángel Comizzo	3 August 2023
Deportivo Municipal	(Peru) Rafael Castillo	Mutual agreement	2 August 2023	17th	(Peru) Adrián Celis	2 August 2023
Alianza Lima	(Colombia) Nixon Perea	End of caretaker spell	5 August 2023	4th	(Uruguay) Mauricio Larriera	2 August 2023
Alianza Atlético	(Argentina) Carlos Compagnucci	Sacked	21 August 2023	17th	(Peru) Jorge Ágapo Gonzales	21 August 2023
Universidad César Vallejo	(Uruguay) Sebastián Abreu	Mutual agreement	30 August 2023	14th	(Peru) Roberto Mosquera	30 August 2023
Deportivo Municipal	(Peru) Adrián Celis	End of caretaker spell	8 September 2023	19th	(Peru) Santiago Acasiete	8 September 2023
Cienciano	(Argentina) Gerardo Ameli	Sacked	11 September 2023	12th	(Peru) Óscar Ibáñez	11 September 2023
Cusco	(Uruguay) Pablo Peirano	Sacked	18 September 2023	13th	(Peru) Luis Flores	19 September 2023

== Torneo Apertura ==
=== Standings ===
Pos	Team	Pld	W	D	L	GF	GA	GD	Pts	Qualification
1	Alianza Lima	18	14	0	4	37	16	+21	42	Advance to the Playoffs
2	Sporting Cristal	18	9	8	1	33	18	+15	35	
3	Universitario	18	11	1	6	29	14	+15	34	
4	Cusco	18	10	2	6	24	22	+2	32	
5	Sport Huancayo	18	8	3	7	30	25	+5	27	
6	Universidad César Vallejo	18	7	6	5	25	23	+2	27	
7	Carlos A. Mannucci	18	8	3	7	17	18	−1	27	
8	Deportivo Garcilaso	18	6	7	5	32	27	+5	25	
9	Melgar	18	6	7	5	24	22	+2	25	
10	Deportivo Municipal	18	7	3	8	19	21	−2	24	
11	Cienciano	18	7	3	8	23	28	−5	24	
12	Atlético Grau	18	6	5	7	31	21	+10	23	
13	Alianza Atlético	18	6	5	7	32	33	−1	23	
14	ADT	18	5	6	7	23	23	0	21	
15	UTC	18	5	6	7	16	22	−6	21	
16	Unión Comercio	18	5	4	9	24	40	−16	19	
17	Binacional	18	5	3	10	28	34	−6	18	
18	Sport Boys	18	5	3	10	13	26	−13	18	
19	Academia Cantolao	18	2	3	13	9	36	−27	9	

Source: Liga 1, Soccerway
Rules for classification: 1) Points; 2) Goal difference; 3) Goals for; 4) Fair play points; 5) Drawing of lots.

=== Results ===
Home \ Away	ADT	AAS	ALI	CAG	BIN	CAN	CAM	CIE	CUS	GAR	MUN	MEL	SBA	SHU	CRI	UCO	UCV	UNI	UTC
ADT			2–1			1–1		3–4	0–2	1–2	3–0	0–0	1–0				2–0		
Alianza Atlético	1–1		0–1	3–2		2–1						3–3		4–2	0–0			3–1	2–0
Alianza Lima					6–1	3–0	3–0	2–0	2–0	3–2	2–1		2–0				2–0		
Atlético Grau	1–1		1–2			3–0		4–0	3–0		1–1	3–0 (Note: Match awarded 3–0 to Atlético Grau by walkover.)	3–0				1–1		
Binacional	1–0	4–2		2–4			3–0							5–3	0–1	5–0		1–2	1–1
Academia Cantolao					1–0		0–2	1–0	2–3	1–1	0–1		0–0			1–2	1–2		
Carlos A. Mannucci	1–1	1–0		1–0								1–2		0–0	1–1	2–0		2–0	0–1
Cienciano		5–2			1–1		1–0		2–0	0–0	1–0		0–1			3–1	1–1		
Cusco		2–1			2–1		3–0			2–1	1–0		2–1	0–3 (Note: Match awarded 3–0 to Sport Huancayo by walkover.)		2–1	2–0		
Deportivo Garcilaso		3–2		2–0	3–0 (Note: Match awarded 3–0 to Deportivo Garcilaso by walkover.)		1–2							1–1	4–4	2–2		0–0	2–2
Deportivo Municipal		2–1			2–0		0–3 (Note: Match awarded 3–0 to Carlos A. Mannucci by walkover.)			0–3				1–2	1–1	2–0		1–2	2–0
Melgar			2–1		2–1	5–0		1–0	1–1	2–4	0–2		2–0				2–2		
Sport Boys		0–1			2–2		0–1			2–1	0–2			1–0		2–1		0–3	3–2
Sport Huancayo	1–3		2–1	1–0		4–0		1–3				1–1			1–2			1–0	5–1
Sporting Cristal	0–0		3–0 (Note: Match awarded 3–0 to Sporting Cristal by walkover.)	2–1		2–0		4–2	3–2			1–0	1–1				1–1		
Unión Comercio	4–3	3–3	1–3	2–2								1–1		2–0	1–6			1–0	1–0
Universidad César Vallejo		2–2			2–0		2–0			3–0	1–1		2–0	0–2		3–1			3–1
Universitario	3–1		1–2	2–1		4–0		3–0	1–0			1–0			2–0		4–0		
UTC	1–0		0–1	1–1		1–0		3–0 (Note: Match awarded 3–0 to UTC by walkover.)	0–0			0–0			1–1			1–0	

Source: Liga 1, Soccerway
Legend: Blue = home team win; Yellow = draw; Red = away team win.

== Torneo Clausura ==
=== Standings ===
Pos	Team	Pld	W	D	L	GF	GA	GD	Pts	Qualification
1	Universitario	18	11	6	1	28	8	+20	39	Advance to the Playoffs
2	Melgar	18	11	5	2	31	13	+18	38	
3	Alianza Lima	18	10	7	1	18	6	+12	37	
4	Sporting Cristal	18	10	6	2	31	13	+18	36	
5	ADT	18	9	7	2	21	13	+8	34	
6	Sport Huancayo	18	8	5	5	22	14	+8	29	
7	Deportivo Garcilaso (Note: Deportivo Garcilaso were deducted one point as punishment for failing to pay debts.)	18	7	6	5	24	20	+4	26	
8	Universidad César Vallejo	18	7	3	8	25	19	+6	24	
9	Cienciano	18	6	6	6	21	20	+1	24	
10	Sport Boys	18	6	5	7	15	23	−8	23	
11	Carlos A. Mannucci	18	5	5	8	16	22	−6	20	
12	UTC	18	3	10	5	21	23	−2	19	
13	Cusco	18	4	6	8	18	23	−5	18	
14	Atlético Grau	18	4	6	8	17	27	−10	18	
15	Binacional	18	5	2	11	25	34	−9	17	
16	Unión Comercio	18	4	5	9	18	32	−14	17	
17	Academia Cantolao	18	5	2	11	12	26	−14	17	
18	Alianza Atlético	18	4	4	10	14	25	−11	16	
19	Deportivo Municipal	18	4	0	14	17	33	−16	12	

Source: Liga 1, Soccerway
Rules for classification: 1) Points; 2) Goal difference; 3) Goals for; 4) Fair play points; 5) Drawing of lots.

=== Results ===
Home \ Away	ADT	AAS	ALI	CAG	BIN	CAN	CAM	CIE	CUS	GAR	MUN	MEL	SBA	SHU	CRI	UCO	UCV	UNI	UTC
ADT		1–0		1–0	2–0		0–0							2–1	1–1	3–0		2–0	0–0
Alianza Atlético					1–0		1–1	2–1	2–0	2–0	1–2		1–2			2–2	0–1		
Alianza Lima	0–0	1–0		2–0								0–0		1–0	0–0	3–1		0–0	1–0
Atlético Grau		1–1			2–1		0–2			1–1				0–0	2–3	0–1		2–2	4–2
Binacional			1–2			1–0		2–2	2–0	1–5	4–1	1–2	4–0				1–0		
Academia Cantolao	0–1	1–0	0–2	0–4								0–1		1–1	0–2			1–4	2–0
Carlos A. Mannucci			1–2		3–2	1–2		2–0	0–0	0–1	C (Note: Match cancelled and awarded to Carlos A. Mannucci due to Deportivo Municipal having its license suspended.)		0–0				2–1		
Cienciano	2–2		0–0	2–0		1–0						0–1		1–0	1–0			1–1	2–2
Cusco	1–0		1–1	0–0		3–0		0–0				1–1			4–1			1–1	2–1
Deportivo Garcilaso	1–2		0–1			0–0		0–3	2–1		5–2	2–2	3–0				1–0		
Deportivo Municipal	1–2		0–1	C (Note: Match cancelled and awarded to Atlético Grau due to Deportivo Municipal having its license suspended.)		1–2		4–1	2–0			0–1	0–3				0–3		
Melgar	4–0	4–0		3–0			2–1							1–3	1–1	3–1		0–1	1–1
Sport Boys	1–1		1–0	1–1		0–1		2–1	2–1			0–2			1–1		0–2		
Sport Huancayo		2–0			3–1		3–1		3–1	0–0	2–0		1–0			1–1	2–0		
Sporting Cristal		3–0			5–0		3–2			3–0	1–0			2–0		3–0		0–0	1–1
Unión Comercio					2–2	2–1	0–0	2–0	2–1	1–2	1–3		0–1				1–4		
Universidad César Vallejo	1–1		1–1	5–0		2–1		0–3	3–1			1–2			0–1			0–1	
Universitario		2–0			1–0		3–0			1–1	1–0		3–0	2–0		2–0			3–0
UTC		1–1			3–2		2–0			0–0	5–1		1–1	0–0		1–1	1–1		

Source: Liga 1, Soccerway
Legend: Blue = home team win; Yellow = draw; Red = away team win.

== Aggregate table ==
Pos	Team	Pld	W	D	L	GF	GA	GD	Pts	Qualification
1	Alianza Lima	36	24	7	5	55	22	+33	79	Advance to Playoffs and qualification for Copa Libertadores group stage
2	Universitario (C)	36	22	7	7	57	22	+35	73	Advance to Playoffs and qualification for Copa Libertadores group stage
3	Sporting Cristal	36	19	14	3	64	31	+33	71	Qualification for Copa Libertadores second stage
4	Melgar	36	17	12	7	55	35	+20	63	Qualification for Copa Libertadores first stage
5	Sport Huancayo	36	16	8	12	52	39	+13	56	Qualification for Copa Sudamericana first stage
6	ADT	36	14	13	9	44	36	+8	55	Qualification for Copa Sudamericana first stage
7	Deportivo Garcilaso (Note: Deportivo Garcilaso were deducted one point as punishment for failing to pay debts.)	36	13	13	10	56	47	+9	51	Qualification for Copa Sudamericana first stage
8	Universidad César Vallejo	36	14	9	13	50	42	+8	51	Qualification for Copa Sudamericana first stage
9	Cusco	36	14	8	14	42	45	−3	50	
10	Cienciano	36	13	9	14	44	48	−4	48	
11	Carlos A. Mannucci	36	13	8	15	33	40	−7	47	
12	Atlético Grau	36	10	11	15	48	48	0	41	
13	UTC	36	8	16	12	37	45	−8	40	
14	Alianza Atlético	36	10	9	17	46	58	−12	39	
15	Sport Boys (Note: Sport Boys were deducted four points as punishment for failing to pay debts.)	36	11	8	17	28	49	−21	37	
16	Unión Comercio	36	9	9	18	42	72	−30	36	
17	Binacional (R)	36	10	5	21	53	68	−15	35	Relegation to Liga 2
18	Deportivo Municipal (Note: Deportivo Municipal were deducted five points as punishment for failing to pay debts.) (R)	36	11	3	22	36	54	−18	31	Relegation to Liga 2
19	Academia Cantolao (R)	36	7	5	24	21	62	−41	26	Relegation to Liga 2

Source: Liga 1
Rules for classification: 1) Points; 2) Goal difference; 3) Goals for; 4) Fair play points; 5) Drawing of lots.
(C) Champions; (R) Relegated

== Playoffs ==
As the champions of the Apertura (Alianza Lima) and Clausura (Universitario) tournaments were also the top two teams in the aggregate table, both teams qualified directly to the final, omitting the semifinal matches (Regulations Article 7.3.1.8). Alianza Lima had the chance to decide the order of legs as the finalist better placed in the aggregate table.

Semi-finals	Finals
	Universitario	1	2	3
	Alianza Lima	1	0	1

=== Finals ===
==== First leg ====
4 November 2023
20:00 UTC−5

Universitario	1–1	Alianza Lima
Valera 63' (pen.)	Report	Costa 90+4'

Estadio Monumental, Lima
Referee: Kevin Ortega

==== Second leg ====
8 November 2023
20:00 UTC−5

Alianza Lima	0–2	Universitario
	Report	Flores 3'; Calcaterra 82'

Estadio Alejandro Villanueva, Lima
Referee: Edwin Ordóñez

Universitario won 3–1 on aggregate.

== Top scorers ==
Rank	Player	Club	Goals
1	(Argentina) Santiago Giordana	Deportivo Garcilaso	22
2	(Colombia) Yorleys Mena	Universidad César Vallejo	17
2	(Argentina) Bernardo Cuesta	Melgar	17
2	(Argentina) Hernán Barcos	Alianza Lima	17
5	(Ecuador) Carlos Garcés	Cienciano	16
6	(Paraguay) Adrián Fernández	Alianza Atlético	15
6	(Argentina) Neri Bandiera	Atlético Grau	15
6	(Peru) Alex Valera	Universitario	15
9	(Ecuador) Marlon de Jesús	Unión Comercio	13
9	(Peru) Janio Posito	ADT	13
9	(Brazil) Brenner	Sporting Cristal	13

Source: Futbolperuano.com

== See also ==
- 2023 Liga 2
- 2023 Copa Perú
- 2023 Ligas Departamentales del Perú
- 2023 Torneo de Promoción y Reserva
- 2023 Liga Femenina
- 2023 Liga de Ascenso Femenina
- Iluminados
