= José Rivera (Peruvian footballer) =

Peruvian footballer (born 1997)

Personal information
- Full name: José Daniel Rivera Martínez
- Date of birth: 8 May 1997 (age 29)
- Place of birth: Tarapoto, Peru
- Height: 1.72 m (5 ft 8 in)
- Position: Winger

Team information
- Current team: Universitario de Deportes
- Number: 11

Youth career
- CD Olimpico Juniors
- 2014–2016: Unión Comercio

Senior career*
Years	Team	Apps	(Gls)
2016–2019	Unión Comercio	87	(13)
2020–2021	Cusco	40	(11)
2022	Carlos A. Mannucci	34	(7)
2023–	Universitario de Deportes	94	(25)

International career^{‡}
2019–2020	Peru U23	3	(0)
2022–	Peru	7	(0)
- * Club domestic league appearances and goals as of 10:02, 4 January 2026 (UTC) ‡ National team caps and goals as of 23:08, 4 September 2025 (UTC)

José Daniel Rivera Martínez (born 8 May 1997) is a Peruvian professional footballer who plays as a winger for Peruvian Liga 1 club Universitario de Deportes.

== Club career ==
Rivera made his way through the youth ranks of Unión Comercio and, after three years, he was promoted to the first team in the 2016 season under manager Walter Aristizábal. He made his debut on 11 September 2016 in a 1–0 victory against César Vallejo. In May 2017, Rivera scored his first professional goal in a 2–1 victory against Alianza Atlético. He played a total of 22 league games in the 2016 and 2017 seasons. In that last season, he did not play regularly due to the good form of forward Cristian Lasso. From the 2018 season onwards, Rivera became a regular player, scoring 7 goals in 31 matches. In the 2019 season, he played almost all of Comercio's Liga 1 matches, scoring 4 goals and making 5 assists in 33 games, being the team's player with the most assists; however, Comercio was relegated at the end of the year.

Having made 87 league appearances for Unión Comercio, he left the club at the end of the 2019 season to join Cusco FC, signing a deal until the end of 2021 in February 2020. On 24 November 2021 it was confirmed that Rivera would join Carlos A. Mannucci for the 2022 season.

Ahead of the 2023 season, Rivera then moved to Universitario de Deportes. He played his first game with Universitario on matchday 3, in a 4–0 victory against Academia Cantolao, and scored his first goal on matchday 13, in a 2–0 victory against Sporting Cristal. That season, the club won the national title after defeating Alianza Lima in the finals, which gave Rivera his first professional title.

== International career ==
In May 2019, Rivera was called up for the Peruvian U23 national team, under manager Nolberto Solano, to play the 2019 Pan American Games. He played one game and was on the bench in the remaining three games. In October 2019, he was called up once again, to the squad that was going to play in the 2020 CONMEBOL Pre-Olympic Tournament, where he played 2 matches. In June 2024, he was called to the senior team for the 2024 Copa América.

== Career statistics ==
As of 25 August 2025

Club	Division	League			Cup		Continental		Total	
Club	Division	Season	Apps	Goals	Apps	Goals	Apps	Goals	Apps	Goals
Unión Comercio	Torneo Descentralizado	2016	11	0	—		—		11	0
Unión Comercio	Torneo Descentralizado	2017	11	2	—		—		11	2
Unión Comercio	Torneo Descentralizado	2018	32	7	—		—		32	7
Unión Comercio	Liga 1	2019	32	4	3	0	—		35	4
Unión Comercio	Total		86	13	3	0	0	0	89	13
Cusco	Liga 1	2020	20	8	—		—		20	8
Cusco	Liga 1	2021	20	3	1	0	—		21	3
Cusco	Total		40	11	1	0	0	0	41	11
Carlos A. Mannucci	Liga 1	2022	34	7	—		—		34	7
Universitario de Deportes	Liga 1	2023	26	3	—		5	0	31	3
Universitario de Deportes	Liga 1	2024	28	7	—		4	2	32	9
Universitario de Deportes	Liga 1	2025	21	8	—		7	0	28	8
Universitario de Deportes	Total		75	18	—		16	2	91	20
Career total			235	49	4	0	16	2	255	45

=== International ===
As of 4 September 2025

Appearances and goals by national team and year
National team	Year	Apps	Goals
Peru	2022	1	0
Peru	2024	5	0
Peru	2025	1	0
Total		7	0

== Honours ==
Universitario de Deportes

- Peruvian Primera División: 2023
- Peruvian Primera División: 2024
- Peruvian Primera División: 2025
