= 2024–25 Liga 1 =

2024–25 Liga 1 may refer to:

- 2024–25 Liga 1 (Indonesia), season of the Indonesian first division, from 9 August 2024 – 25 May 2025
- 2024 Liga 1 (Peru), season of the Peruvian first division, from 26 January – 3 November 2024
- 2025 Liga 1 (Peru), season of the Peruvian first division, from 7 February – 14 December 2025
