= Edson Aubert =

Peruvian footballer (born 1988)

Personal information
- Full name: Edson Diego Aubert Cervantes
- Date of birth: 24 November 1988 (age 37)
- Place of birth: Arequipa, Peru
- Height: 1.72 m (5 ft 8 in)
- Position: Attacking midfielder

Team information
- Current team: Alianza Universidad
- Number: 88

Youth career
- 2003-2004: IDUNSA

Senior career*
Years	Team	Apps	(Gls)
2005	Atlético Universidad	3	(0)
2006–2007	IDUNSA		
2008	Diablos Rojos		
2009–2011	Melgar	103	(14)
2012	Alianza Lima	4	(0)
2012–2013	Melgar	39	(2)
2014	Los Caimanes	24	(3)
2014–2015	Real Garcilaso	43	(1)
2016–2017	Sport Huancayo	17	(1)
2017	Cienciano	10	(4)
2017	Comerciantes Unidos	3	(0)
2018–2019	Binacional	71	(7)
2020	Melgar	23	(0)
2021	Cusco	26	(4)
2022–2023	Binacional	64	(3)
2024	ADT	21	(0)
2025	Binacional	16	(1)
2025–	Alianza Universidad	8	(0)
- * Club domestic league appearances and goals as of 30 December 2025

Edson Diego Aubert Cervantes (born 24 November 1988) is a Peruvian professional footballer who plays as an attacking midfielder for Alianza Universidad in the Peruvian Primera División.

== Career ==
=== Early career ===
Aubert was born in Arequipa. He made his league debut in the Torneo Descentralizado in the 2005 season playing for his local club Atlético Universidad, at the age of 16. However, his club was relegated at the end of the season. In 2006, he joined Club IDUNSA (Instituto del Deporte Universitario de la Universidad Nacional de San Agustín), which was also based in Arequipa. There he played in the 2006 Copa Perú season. In the 2007 Copa Perú season his club managed to reach the semifinal stage but were then eliminated by Sport Águila. Then in 2008 he joined Puno based club Diablos Rojos de Juliaca. There he played in the 2008 Copa Perú season and helped his club reach the Round of 16. There his club met his former side Club IDUNSA and lost 2–1 on aggregate.

=== FBC Melgar ===
In January 2009 Aubert returned to his hometown and joined Arequipa giants FBC Melgar for the start of the 2009 Torneo Descentralizado season. After three years, Aubert returned to the Descentralizado and made his debut that season with Melgar in Round 14 against Coronel Bolognesi. Playing at home in the Mariano Melgar Stadium, Aubert managed to play the entire match and help his side win 2–1.

=== Alianza Lima ===
On 15 December 2011, it was reported that Aubert joined Peruvian giants Alianza Lima for the start of the 2012 season.
