= 2025 Sporting Cristal season =

Football league season

Sporting Cristal
2025 season
- Stadium: Alberto Gallardo, Lima
- Liga 1: Tornel Apertura: Fifth (5°); Tornel Clausura: Third (3°); Aggregate Table: Fourth (4°); Final Runner-up: Third (3°); Runner-up National (2°)
- Copa Libertadores: Group stage
Home colours	Away colours	Third colours

The 2025 Sporting Cristal season were the Seventieth (70.º) of the club from its foundation in 1955, Seventy (70) participations consecutives in the top-flight of Peruvian Primera División (of 109 Editions) with denomination last Liga 1. In Previous Season the club qualified as Runner-up 2nd Place of the 2024 Liga 1.

Sporting Cristal were a of nineteen (19) clubs in the Seventh edition (7.º) Liga 1, the competition most important of the Peruvian football. The club played the Peruvian Primera División and Copa Libertadores for Fortieth (40th) Time.

== Liga 1 ==
=== Torneo Apertura ===
Pos	Team	Pld	W	D	L	GF	GA	GD	Pts
4	Alianza Atlético	18	11	1	6	28	18	+10	34
5	Sporting Cristal	18	10	2	6	31	24	+7	32
6	FBC Melgar	18	8	7	3	28	20	+8	31

== See also ==
- Club Sporting Cristal
- 2025 Liga 1
