= Andy Polar =

Peruvian footballer (born 1997)

Personal information
- Full name: Andy Jeferson Polar Paredes
- Date of birth: 17 February 1997 (age 29)
- Place of birth: Miraflores District, Arequipa, Peru, Peru
- Height: 1.66 m (5 ft 5 in)
- Positions: Midfielder; winger

Team information
- Current team: Binacional
- Number: 10

Senior career*
Years	Team	Apps	(Gls)
2016–	Binacional	232	(50)
- * Club domestic league appearances and goals as of 29 October 2023

Andy Jeferson Polar Paredes (born 17 February 1997) is a Peruvian footballer who plays as a midfielder or winger for Binacional.

== Career ==
At the age of 14, Polar debuted for his neighborhood side at the Copa Perú. Before the 2016 season, Polar signed for Binacional in the Peruvian third division, helping them earn promotion to the Peruvian top flight and win their only top flight title.

== Career statistics ==
=== Club ===
As of 29 October 2023.

Club	Season	League			Cup		Continental		Total	
Club	Season	Division	Apps	Goals	Apps	Goals	Apps	Goals	Apps	Goals
Deportivo Binacional	2016	Copa Perú	35	11	—		—		35	11
Deportivo Binacional	2017	Copa Perú	23	9	—		—		23	9
Deportivo Binacional	2018	Torneo Descentralizado	42	6	—		—		42	6
Deportivo Binacional	2019	Liga 1	32	8	4	0	2	0	38	8
Deportivo Binacional	2020	Liga 1	14	2	1	0	4	0	19	2
Deportivo Binacional	2021	Liga 1	20	2	1	0	—		21	2
Deportivo Binacional	2022	Liga 1	36	5	—		—		36	5
Deportivo Binacional	2023	Liga 1	28	7	—		—		28	7
Career total			232	50	6	0	6	0	244	50
