= 2023 Sporting Cristal season =

Football league season

Sporting Cristal
2023 season
- Stadium: Alberto Gallardo, Lima
- Liga 1: Tornel Apertura: Second (2°); Tornel Clausura: Fourth (4°); Aggregate Table: Third (3°); Third National (3°)
- Copa Bicentenario: Cancelled for COVID-19
- Copa Libertadores: Group stage
- Copa Sudamericana: Round of 16 Play-offs
Home colours	Away colours	Third colours

The 2023 Sporting Cristal season were the Sixty-Eighth (68.º) of the club from its foundation in 1955, Sixty-Eight (68) participations consecutives in the top-flight of Peruvian Primera División (of 107 Editions) with denomination last Liga 1. In Previous Season the club qualified as 3rd Place of the 2022 Liga 1.

Sporting Cristal were a of nineteen (19) clubs in the Fifth edition (5.º) Liga 1, the competition most important of the Peruvian football. The club played the Peruvian Primera División, Copa Libertadores for Thirty-Eighth (38th) Time and Copa Sudamericana for Fourth (4th) Time.

== Liga 1 ==
=== Torneo Apertura ===
Pos	Team	Pld	W	D	L	GF	GA	GD	Pts
1	Alianza Lima	18	14	0	4	37	16	+21	42
2	Sporting Cristal	18	9	8	1	33	18	+15	35
3	Universitario	18	11	1	6	29	14	+15	34

== See also ==
- Club Sporting Cristal
- 2023 Liga 1
