= Ágapo Gonzales =

Peruvian football manager (born 1971)

Personal information
- Full name: Jorge Ágapo Gonzales Saldarriaga
- Date of birth: 25 March 1967 (age 59)
- Place of birth: Mallaritos, Peru
- Position: Centre back

Team information
- Current team: Alianza Atlético (reserves manager)

Youth career
- Deportivo Mallarés

Senior career*
Years	Team	Apps	(Gls)
1987–1994	Alianza Atlético		
1995	Sport Boys		
1996–1997	Atlético Torino		
1998	Unión Minas		
1999–2000	Alianza Atlético		

Managerial career
- Universitario (youth)
- 2006–2007: San Francisco Javier-Jesuitas
- 2008–2010: América Cochahuayco
- 2011: Alianza Unicachi
- 2012: Defensor Politécnico
- 2013: Binacional
- 2014: Alianza Atlético
- 2014: Estudiantes Puno
- 2014: Atlético Torino
- 2014: Sport Rosario
- 2018: Sport Collao de Ilave
- 2018: Deportivo Robles de Calca
- 2019: Deportivo Cali de Tarapoto
- 2019: Bellavista FC
- 2022: Atlético Torino
- 2023: Alianza Atlético (reserves)
- 2023: Alianza Atlético (interim)
- 2023: Alianza Atlético
- 2024–: Alianza Atlético (reserves)
- * Club domestic league appearances and goals

Jorge Ágapo Gonzales Saldarriaga (born 25 March 1967) is a Peruvian football manager and former player who played as a central defender. He is the current manager of Alianza Atlético's reserve team.

== Playing career ==
Born in Mallaritos, Sullana, Gonzales began his career with hometown side Deportivo Mallarés before joining Alianza Atlético in 1987. After becoming a starter for the side, he received a call-up to the Peru national team in 1991, but was unable to debut.

Gonzales moved to Sport Boys for the 1995, but after being unable to establish himself as a regular starter, he joined Atlético Torino in the following year. In 1998, after Torino's relegation, he signed for Unión Minas.

Gonzales returned to Alianza Atlético in 1999, and retired in 2000 before the start of the new season due to an ankle injury.

== Managerial career ==
After retiring, Gonzales worked in the youth categories of Universitario before taking over his first senior side with San Francisco Javier-Jesuitas in 2006. In 2008, he returned to the structure of América Cochahuayco, which was their reserve team at the time.

On 27 January 2011, Gonzales was named Alianza Unicachi manager. In the following two years, he won regional championships with Defensor Politécnico and Binacional, before returning to his main club Alianza Atlético in March 2014.

In June 2014, after a short period at Estudiantes Puno, Gonzales took over another team he represented as a player, Atlético Torino. He ended the season, however, in charge of Sport Rosario.

On 3 March 2023, after being in charge of several lower league sides, Gonzales returned to Alianza Atlético as manager of the reserve squad. He was an interim manager of the first team in May, after the departure of Carlos Desio, and returned to his previous role in June after the arrival of Carlos Compagnucci.

On 21 August 2023, Gonzales was named permanent manager of Alianza, after Compagnucci was sacked.
