= Miguel Aucca =

Peruvian footballer (born 1998)

Personal information
- Full name: Miguel Ángel Aucca Cruz
- Date of birth: 10 August 1998 (age 28)
- Place of birth: Cusco, Peru
- Height: 1.68 m (5 ft 6 in)
- Position: Defensive midfielder

Team information
- Current team: Cusco
- Number: 5

Youth career
- Unión Alto Huarca
- Real Garcilaso

Senior career*
Years	Team	Apps	(Gls)
2016–	Cusco	151	(7)
- * Club domestic league appearances and goals as of 1 December 2025

Miguel Ángel Aucca Cruz (born 10 August 1998) is a Peruvian footballer who plays as a defensive midfielder for Peruvian Primera División side Cusco FC.

== Career ==
=== Club career ===
Aucca is a product of Real Garcilaso and got his official debut for the club in the Peruvian Primera División on 21 August 2016 against Juan Aurich. From his debut until 2019, he made 40 league appearances for the club. Real Garcilaso changed name to Cusco FC for the 2020 season.

On 7 December 2021, Aucca signed a contract extension with Cusco, until the end of 2022. He made a total six appearances in the 2021 season.
