= Víctor Balta =

Peruvian footballer (born 1986)

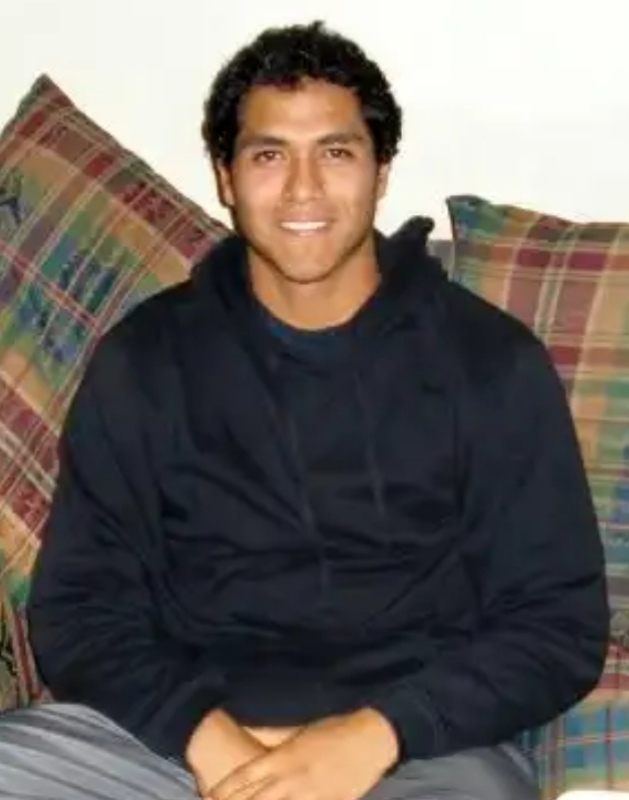

Personal information
- Full name: Víctor Julio Rodolfo Balta Mori
- Date of birth: 3 January 1986 (age 40)
- Place of birth: Iquitos, Peru
- Height: 1.81 m (5 ft 11 in)
- Position: Centre-back

Team information
- Current team: Melgar (assistant)

Youth career
- 2002–2006: Universitario

Senior career*
Years	Team	Apps	(Gls)
2006–2009	Universitario	69	(1)
2010	Juan Aurich	15	(0)
2011	Universitario	4	(0)
2012–2014	Melgar	73	(5)
2015	León de Huánuco	28	(1)
2016–2017	Sport Huancayo	72	(3)
2018	Binacional	25	(0)
2019–2023	Sport Huancayo	185	(12)
2024	Atlético Universidad		

Managerial career
- 2024–2025: Melgar (women)
- 2025–: Melgar (assistant)
- 2025: Melgar (interim)
- * Club domestic league appearances and goals

Víctor Julio Rodolfo Balta Mori (born 3 January 1986) is a Peruvian football manager and former player who played as a centre-back. He is the current assistant manager of Melgar.

Balta began his playing career in 2006 with Universitario de Deportes where he won two championships with the team.

== Honours ==
=== Club ===
Universitario de Deportes

- Apertura: 2008
- Torneo Descentralizado (1): 2009
