= Daniel Ferreyra =

Argentine football goalkeeper

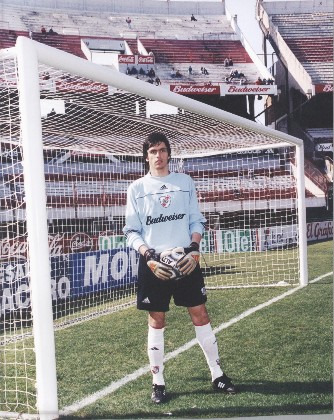

Personal information
- Full name: Daniel Andrés Ferreyra Silva
- Date of birth: 22 January 1982 (age 44)
- Place of birth: San Nicolás, Argentina
- Height: 1.91 m (6 ft 3 in)
- Position: Goalkeeper

Youth career
- 1996–2002: River Plate

Senior career*
Years	Team	Apps	(Gls)
2002	River Plate	0	(0)
2003–2004	Rosario Central	0	(0)
2005	→ Candelaria (loan)	5	(0)
2006–2008	→ Coquimbo Unido (loan)	107	(0)
2009–2011	José Gálvez FBC	83	(0)
2011–2013	U. César Vallejo	22	(0)
2013–2015	UT Cajamarca	83	(0)
2015	FBC Melgar	13	(0)
2016–2018	Sport Boys	76	(0)
2019	Real Garcilaso	28	(0)
2020–2021	Cienciano	30	(0)
2022–2023	Cusco	56	(0)
2024	Los Chankas	27	(0)

Managerial career
- 2025: Comerciantes Unidos (assistant)
- 2025: Comerciantes Unidos
Medal record
Melgar
Winner	Peruvian League	2015
- * Club domestic league appearances and goals

Daniel Andrés Ferreyra Silva (born 22 January 1982) is an Argentine football coach and former player who played as a goalkeeper.

== Career ==
Ferreyra began his career with Argentine giants River Plate, but shortly after making his first team debut he was transferred to Rosario Central in 2003. By 2004 he had been released from his contract and found himself playing for Club Athlético Candalaria in the regionalised 3rd division of Argentine football.

In 2006 Ferreyra, left Argentine football to join Coquimbo Unido in the top flight of Chilean football.

== Honours ==
FBC Melgar

- Peruvian Primera División: 2015

Sport Boys

- 2017 Peruvian Segunda División

Cusco FC

- Peruvian Segunda División: 2022
