= Aldair Rodríguez =

Peruvian footballer (born 1994)

Personal information
- Full name: Marco Aldair Rodríguez Iraola
- Date of birth: 6 August 1994 (age 32)
- Place of birth: Lima, Peru
- Height: 1.86 m (6 ft 1 in)
- Positions: Winger; forward

Team information
- Current team: ADT
- Number: 22

Youth career
- 2005: Sport Boys
- 2006: Sporting Cristal
- 2008–2012: Alianza Lima

Senior career*
Years	Team	Apps	(Gls)
2012–2014	Alianza Lima	4	(0)
2013	→ Melgar (loan)	10	(1)
2014	Universidad César Vallejo	8	(0)
2014-2015	→ Alianza Lima (loan)	14	(0)
2016–2017	Alianza Atlético	38	(7)
2018–2020	Binacional	72	(19)
2020–2021	América de Cali	17	(0)
2021–2023	Alianza Lima	74	(7)
2024–2025	Cienciano	32	(2)
2025	Deportivo Garcilaso	12	(0)
2025	Amazonas	9	(0)
2026–	ADT	12	(0)
- * Club domestic league appearances and goals as of 18 December 2025

Marco Aldair Rodríguez Iraola (born 6 August 1994), is a Peruvian professional footballer who plays as a striker for brazilian club ADT. Aldair came into fame after breaking the leg of Robert Rojas during a game for the Copa Libertadores tournament in Peru. Aldair, frustrated by his performance during the match, assaulted Robert Rojas knocking him to the ground, and kicking lower leg causing a fracture of the tibia. Aldair did not apologize to the injured player but instead opted to hurl insults while the player agonized on the ground.

== Club career ==
Rodríguez started his football career with 10 years old in the lower categories of Sport Boys, then he went to Sporting Cristal and at the age of 13 he arrived to Alianza Lima.

In 2012, Rodriguez signed his first professional contract with Alianza Lima and makes his professional debut on 18 July 2012 entering as a substitute in the 85th minute in a match against Inti Gas which ended in a 1–1 draw.

In the absence of opportunities in Alianza Lima, in mid-2013 he decide to go out on loan to FBC Melgar at the request of Melgar's coach Franco Navarro. With Melgar, he made 10 appearances and scored his first goal in the professional football in a 4–4 home draw against Sport Huancayo on 26 October 2013.

Early in 2014, he returned to Alianza Lima but shortly after was transferred as free agent to club Universidad César Vallejo as part of the negotiations between Alianza Lima and Universidad César Vallejo for the footballer Víctor Cedrón. However, in September 2014 returned to Alianza Lima on loan from Universidad César Vallejo for the rest of the 2014 season and all the 2015 season. In the 2014 Torneo Clausura he had no participation while in the 2015 season he just made 11 appearances without scoring goals.

=== Alianza Atlético ===
Late in 2015, Rodríguez resigned his contract with Alianza Lima and signed with Alianza Atlético for the 2016 season at the request of Gustavo Roverano who had been his coach the previous year. He started the season playing several matches and scoring 4 goals but a broken jaw suffered in a game against Deportivo Municipal left him out for five months.

In total, during the season he made 21 appearances and scored 4 goals.

In 2017, he continued playing for Alianza Atlético with 17 appearances and 3 goals scored.

=== Binacional ===
In 2018 Rodríguez joined club Binacional for the 2018 Torneo Descentralizado. At the end of the 2018 season his team finished in the 8th place on the aggregate table and secured the last spot for the 2019 Copa Sudamericana.

On 5 February 2019, Binacional announces that Rodríguez would remain in the team for the 2019 season. Rodríguez had his breakthrough season, he made 32 appearances and scored 11 goals finishing in the top ten goalscorers of 2019 Liga 1, as Binacional celebrated their Liga 1 title victory and the qualification for the 2020 Copa Libertadores. However, in the Copa Sudamericana, his team was eliminated in the first round by the Argentine club Independiente.

On 4 January 2020, Rodriguez renewed his contract with Binacional for the 2020 season.

On 5 March 2020, he scored the first goal of his team in the historic 2–1 home win over Brazilian club São Paulo in Binacional's Copa Libertadores debut.

=== América de Cali ===
On 18 September 2020, Rodriguez was transferred to América de Cali in the Colombian Categoría Primera A from Deportivo Binacional.

On 25 June 2021, Rodriguez parted ways with the Colombian club. The contract was terminated on mutual agreement.

=== Return to Alianza Lima ===
On 3 July 2021, Alianza Lima confirmed the signing of Rodriguez lasting until 31 December 2022.

== International career ==
On 28 August 2020, he received his first call-up for the Peru senior national team by the manager Ricardo Gareca to take part in a training camp early in September 2020.

== Honours ==
=== Club ===
Binacional

- Liga 1 de Fútbol (1): 2019
