= Javier Arce =

Peruvian association football manager

Personal information
- Full name: Javier Silvano Arce Arias
- Date of birth: 28 February 1957 (age 69)
- Place of birth: Ica, Peru

Team information
- Current team: Sport Huancayo B (manager)

Managerial career
- Years: Team
- 2012–2013: José Gálvez
- 2013: Defensor San Alejandro
- 2013: Unión Comercio
- 2014–2015: Defensor San Alejandro
- 2015: UTC
- 2015: Sport Loreto
- 2016: Unión Huaral
- 2017: Deportivo Garcilaso
- 2017: Unión Comercio
- 2018: Comerciantes Unidos
- 2019: Binacional
- 2019–2020: Cusco
- 2020: Binacional
- 2021: Atlético Grau
- 2021: Sport Huancayo
- 2022: Alfonso Ugarte
- 2022: Carlos Stein
- 2023: Diablos Rojos
- 2025: Comerciantes Unidos (youth)
- 2025: Comerciantes Unidos (interim)
- 2025: Deportivo Coopsol
- 2026–: Sport Huancayo B

Javier Silvano Arce Arias (born 28 February 1957) is a Peruvian football manager, currently the manager of Sport Huancayo B.

== Career ==
After beginning his career as a fitness coach, Arce was named manager of José Gálvez in March 2012, in the place of Wilmar Valencia. He then coached Defensor San Alejandro (two times), Unión Comercio (two times), UTC, Sport Loreto, Unión Huaral, Deportivo Garcilaso, Comerciantes Unidos, Binacional (two times), Cusco, Atlético Grau and Sport Huancayo. With Binacional he won the 2019 Apertura title.
