= Carlos Silvestri =

Peruvian football manager (born 1972)

Personal information
- Full name: Carlos Jeanpierre Silvestri Saux
- Date of birth: 22 June 1976 (age 50)
- Place of birth: Lima, Peru
- Height: 1.85 m (6 ft 1 in)
- Position: Goalkeeper

Team information
- Current team: Alianza Universidad (manager)

Senior career*
Years	Team	Apps	(Gls)
1991–1996	San Agustín		
1997	Melgar		
1998	Deportivo Municipal		
1999	Deportivo Pesquero		
2000–2004	Deportivo Municipal		
2005	Virgen de Chapi		

Managerial career
- 2006–2008: Deportivo Municipal (youth)
- 2007: Deportivo Municipal (interim)
- 2009: U América (assistant)
- 2010–2011: Universitario (reserves assistant)
- 2012–2015: Universitario (reserves)
- 2014: Universitario (interim)
- 2015: Universitario (interim)
- 2016–2018: Cantolao
- 2018–2020: Peru U17
- 2020–2021: Peru U20
- 2021: Deportivo Coopsol
- 2021–2022: Cantolao
- 2023–2024: Comerciantes Unidos
- 2025: Peru U20
- 2026: Cajamarca
- 2026–: Alianza Universidad
- * Club domestic league appearances and goals

Carlos Jeanpierre Silvestri Saux (born 22 June 1972) is a Peruvian football manager and former player who played as a goalkeeper. He is the current manager of Alianza Universidad.

== Playing career ==
Born in Lima, Silvestri began his career with San Agustín in 1991. He was a regular starter in the club's relegation campaign in 1996, receiving a call-up to the Peru national team in June of that year.

In 1997, Silvestri moved to fellow top-tier side FBC Melgar, but was mainly a backup option before signing for Deportivo Municipal in the following year. After six months without a club, he spent the remainder of the 1999 campaign with Deportivo Pesquero, before returning to Municipal in 2000.

Silvestri suffered relegation with the Muni in his first season, but remained at the club until 2004, missing out promotion back to the top tier. In 2005, after a year at Virgen de Chapi, he retired.

== Managerial career ==
After retiring, Silvestri obtained his coaching license in 2006, and started working at Deportivo Municipal's youth setup. He moved to U América in the 2009 season, as an assistant of Jorge Ágapo Gonzales.

Silvestri joined Universitario in 2010, initially as an assistant manager of the reserve team. He was named in charge of the reserve side in 2012, being also an interim manager of the first team on two occasions.

On 26 January 2016, Silvestri was appointed Cantolao manager, and led the side to the top tier in his first season as champions. In April 2018, he was named in charge of the Peru national under-17 team.

Silvestri took over the under-20 national team in 2020, but left in March of the following year as his contract expired. He returned to club duties on 19 July 2021, after being appointed manager of Deportivo Coopsol in the Liga 2.

On 30 September 2021, Silvestri returned to Cantolao. He left the club on a mutual agreement the following 2 June.

== Honours ==
Academia Cantolao

- Peruvian Segunda División: 2016

Comerciantes Unidos

- Liga 2 (Peru): 2023
