= Claudio Bustamante =

Peruvian footballer (born 1983)

Personal information
- Full name: Claudio Sergio Bustamante Aguayo
- Date of birth: 12 December 1983 (age 42)
- Place of birth: Arequipa, Peru
- Height: 1.85 m (6 ft 1 in)
- Position: Midfielder

Team information
- Current team: Binacional (manager)

Youth career
- Colegio La Salle
- Melgar

Senior career*
Years	Team	Apps	(Gls)
2000–2006	Melgar		
2007	UTC		
2008–2009	Deportivo Municipal		
2010	Sport Áncash		
2011	Sportivo Huracán		

Managerial career
- 2015: Cantolao (assistant)
- 2016–2017: Alianza Lima (youth)
- 2018: Universidad César Vallejo (youth)
- 2019: Royal Pari (assistant)
- 2019: Binacional (assistant)
- 2020–2022: Sporting Cristal (assistant)
- 2023–2025: Melgar (assistant)
- 2025–: Binacional
- * Club domestic league appearances and goals

Claudio Sergio Bustamante Aguayo (born 12 December 1983) is a Peruvian football manager and former player who played as a midfielder. He is the manager of Binacional.

== Career ==
Born in Arequipa, Bustamante began playing at hometown side Colegio La Salle before being spotted by Melgar, where he would make his first team debut in 2000. After leaving the club in 2006, he subsequently represented Universidad Técnica de Cajamarca, Deportivo Municipal, Sport Áncash and Sportivo Huracán, retiring with the latter in 2011.

After retiring, Bustamante was an assistant manager at Cantolao in 2015, but moved to Alianza Lima in the following year to coach the youth sides. In 2019, after a short spell at Universidad César Vallejo also as youth manager, he joined Roberto Mosquera's staff at Bolivian club Royal Pari, as an assistant.

Bustamante followed Mosquera to Binacional and Sporting Cristal, and returned to Melgar on 17 February 2023, as a permanent assistant manager of the main squad. On 22 April 2025, he left the latter, and agreed to return to Binacional as manager just hours later.

== Personal life ==
Bustamante's father Fredy was also a footballer. A defender, he also represented Melgar and Sportivo Huracán.
