= Leonardo Rojas =

Peruvian footballer (born 1961)

Personal information
- Full name: Pedro Leonardo Rojas León
- Date of birth: 9 October 1961 (age 65)
- Place of birth: Lima, Peru
- Height: 1.80 m (5 ft 11 in)
- Position: Defender

Senior career*
Years	Team	Apps	(Gls)
1979–1980	Sport Boys		
1981–1990	Universitario		
1991–1993	Sporting Cristal		

International career
1984–1989	Peru	33	(0)

Managerial career
- 1998–1999: Sporting Cristal (assistant)
- 2002: Alianza Lima (assistant)
- 2006: Peru (assistant)
- 2008: Cienciano (assistant)
- 2008–2009: Juan Aurich (assistant)
- 2009: León de Huánuco
- 2010–2011: León de Huánuco (assistant)
- 2012: Juan Aurich (assistant)
- 2013: Melgar (assistant)
- 2019–2020: UTC (assistant)
- 2021: Deportivo Municipal (assistant)
- 2022: UTC (assistant)
- 2022–2023: ADT (assistant)
- 2023: Carlos A. Mannucci (assistant)
- 2024: Sport Huancayo (assistant)
- 2025: ADT (assistant)
- 2025: ADT (interim)
- 2025: ADT
- * Club domestic league appearances and goals

Pedro Leonardo Rojas León (born 9 October 1961) is a Peruvian football coach and former player who played as a defender.

Rojas played in 33 matches for the Peru national football team from 1983 to 1989. He was also part of Peru's squad for the 1987 Copa América tournament.
