= Erick Torres (footballer, born 1975) =

Peruvian association football player

Personal information
- Full name: Erick Omar Torres Arias
- Date of birth: May 16, 1975 (age 51)
- Place of birth: Puerto Maldonado, Peru
- Height: 1.76 m (5 ft 9 in)
- Position: Defensive midfielder

Youth career
- 1989: Sporting Cristal

Senior career*
Years	Team	Apps	(Gls)
–1994	Inter San Borja		
1994	Unión Huaral		
1995–2004	Sporting Cristal	382	(15)
2005–2006	José Gálvez	38	(5)
2007	Alianza Lima	23	(1)
2008–2010	Univ. César Vallejo	98	(5)
2011	José Gálvez	21	(2)
2012	Univ. Técnica Cajamarca	0	(0)

International career
1997–2006	Peru	11	(0)

Managerial career
- 2014–2017: Deportivo Hualgayoc
- 2017: Binacional
- 2017: Coronel Bolognesi
- 2017–2018: Deportivo Garcilaso
- 2019: Credicoop San Cristóbal
- 2019: Sport Chavelines
- 2020–2021: Alfonso Ugarte
- 2022: Las Palmas de Chota
- 2022: Alfonso Ugarte
- 2023: UTC (youth)
- 2023: Ecosem Pasco
- 2023–2024: UCV Moquegua
- 2024: Binacional
- 2024: Cultural Tambillo
- 2024: Miguel Grau
- 2024: Cultural Volante
- 2025: Binacional
- * Club domestic league appearances and goals

Erick Omar Torres Arias (born May 16, 1975) is a retired professional Peruvian footballer who played as a defensive midfielder.

== Club career ==
Torres started his development as a footballer in the youth academy of Sport Boys Then he started his senior career playing for Internazionale San Borja in the Peruvian Second Division. Torres then played for Second Division side Unión Huaral and helped them achieve promotion by finishing champions of the 1994 Segunda División Peruana. Then in 1995 Torres transferred to Peruvian giants Sporting Cristal. Erick made his Peruvian First Division debut on March 5, 1995 in the first round of the 1995 Descentralizado season. His debut was a derby match away to rivals Universitario de Deportes, which finished in a 2–1 win for La U. Torres would score his first goal in the First Division in the following game against his previous club Unión Huaral.

Torres has also played club football for José Gálvez FBC, Alianza Lima, and Universidad César Vallejo.

== International career ==
Erick was called up by manager Freddy Ternero and played for the Peru U-23 squad in the South American Pre-Olympic Tournament in 1996.

Between 1997 and 2006, Torres played 11 times for the Peruvian national team.

== Honours ==
=== Club ===
Unión Huaral

- Peruvian Second Division: 1994

Sporting Cristal

- Peruvian First Division:(3) 1995, 1996, 2002
- Copa Libertadores: Runner-Up 1997
- Torneo Clausura: 2002, 2004
- Torneo Apertura: 2003

José Gálvez FBC

- Torneo Intermedio: 2011
