= César Chávez-Riva =

Peruvian footballer (born 1964)

Personal information
- Full name: César Humberto Chávez-Riva Gálvez
- Date of birth: 22 November 1964 (age 61)
- Place of birth: Lima, Peru
- Height: 1.81 m (5 ft 11 in)
- Position: Goalkeeper

Team information
- Current team: Binacional (goalkeeping coach)

Senior career*
Years	Team	Apps	(Gls)
1983–1989	Universitario		
1990–1991	Sport Boys		
1992	Defensor Lima		
1996	Ciclista Lima		

International career
1986–1989	Peru	12	(0)

Managerial career
- 2020: Binacional (caretaker)
- 2021: Binacional (caretaker)
- 2024: Binacional (caretaker)
- 2025: Binacional (caretaker)
- * Club domestic league appearances and goals

César Humberto Chávez-Riva Gálvez (born 22 November 1964) is a Peruvian football manager and former player who played as a goalkeeper. He is the current goalkeeping coach of Binacional.

== Career ==
Born in Lima, Chávez Riva played the majority of his career for Universitario. Chávez Riva made 12 appearances for the Peru national football team from 1986 to 1989. He participated in the 1987 and 1989 Copa Américas.
