= César Vaioli =

Argentine football manager

Personal information
- Full name: César Eduardo Vaioli
- Date of birth: 26 April 1969 (age 57)
- Place of birth: Argentina
- Position: Defender

Senior career*
Years	Team	Apps	(Gls)
- Defensores de Belgrano

Managerial career
- 2014: General San Martín
- 2016–2017: Los Andes
- 2019–2021: Los Andes
- 2021: Binacional (interim)
- 2021: Binacional (interim)
- 2022: General Rojo
- 2022–2023: Defensores de Belgrano
- 2023: Binacional
- 2024–2025: Los Chankas (assistant)
- 2024: Los Chankas (interim)
- 2025: Los Chankas
- * Club domestic league appearances and goals

César Eduardo Vaioli (born 26 April 1969) is an Argentine football coach and former player who played as a defender.

== Career ==
Vaioli worked as a fitness coach at San Martín de San Juan, Aldosivi, Atlanta, Tiro Federal in his home country, Guabirá and Bolívar in Bolivia, Universidad Católica del Ecuador, Emelec, Barcelona, Deportivo Quito and LDU Loja in Ecuador, Juan Aurich, Coronel Bolognesi and Binacional in Peru, Deportivo Cali, Atlético Junior and Deportes Tolima in Colombia, O'Higgins in Chile and Platense in Honduras.

Vaioli also had managerial roles during his career, his first senior club being General San Martín in 2014. He also managed Los Andes in some occasions, and was also an interim manager of Binacional twice in 2021.

On 8 April 2022, Vaioli was appointed manager of General Rojo UD, but took over Defensores de Belgrano (a club he already represented as a player) on 27 June. On 11 May 2023, he left the club.

After leaving Defensores, Vaioli returned to Binacional as a fitness coach, but became manager of the club on 5 August 2023, replacing compatriot Juan Manuel Azconzábal. He later moved to Los Chankas, working as an assistant, interim and permanent manager.

On 17 June 2025, Vaioli left Chankas by mutual consent.
