= Luis Flores (footballer, born 1964) =

Peruvian football manager

Personal information
- Full name: Luis Alberto Flores Villena
- Date of birth: 18 August 1964 (age 62)
- Place of birth: Arequipa, Peru
- Position: Midfielder

Team information
- Current team: ANBA Perú (manager)

Senior career*
Years	Team	Apps	(Gls)
1987–1990	FBC Aurora		
1991–1997	Melgar		

Managerial career
- 1998–2002: Melgar (youth)
- 1998: Melgar (interim)
- 1999: Melgar (interim)
- 2001: Melgar (interim)
- 2002: Melgar (interim)
- 2003–2004: Sporting Cristal (assistant)
- 2005: Atlético Universidad
- 2006: Total Clean
- 2007: IDUNSA
- 2008–2009: Cobresol
- 2009–2010: Melgar
- 2011: Sportivo Huracán
- 2012: Sportivo Huracán
- 2013: San Simón
- 2014: Real Garcilaso (assistant)
- 2014: Real Garcilaso
- 2015: Deportivo La Colina
- 2016: Binacional
- 2017: Cerrito de Los Libres
- 2017–2018: Binacional
- 2019: Deportivo Garcilaso
- 2019: Credicoop San Román
- 2020: Credicoop San Cristóbal
- 2020–2021: Binacional
- 2021: Credicoop San Cristóbal
- 2023: Cusco
- 2024: Binacional
- 2024–: ANBA Perú
- * Club domestic league appearances and goals

Luis Alberto Flores Villena (born 18 August 1964) is a Peruvian football manager and former player who played as a midfielder. He is the current manager of ANBA Perú.

== Career ==
After representing FBC Aurora and FBC Melgar as a player, Arequipa-born Flores began his managerial career in the youth sides of his last club. After being an interim manager several times, he moved to Sporting Cristal in 2003, as an assistant.

Flores' first managerial experience occurred in 2005 with Atlético Universidad. After being in charge of lower league sides Total Clean, IDUNSA and Cobresol, he returned to Melgar in 2009.

Flores left Melgar in 2010, being later in charge of Sportivo Huracán for two different periods before being named manager of San Simón in November 2013. One month after arriving at the latter, he lifted the 2013 Copa Perú.

Flores moved to Real Garcilaso in 2014; initially an assistant, he was named interim manager on 29 September 2014. Confirmed as permanent manager on 1 October, he still left on 6 December.

After working at Deportivo La Colina, Flores was named in charge of Binacional for the 2016 campaign, but left in August. He subsequently moved to Cerrito de Los Libres, but returned to Binacional in October 2017.

Shortly after completing one year in charge of Binacional, Flores left the club on 16 October 2018. He was subsequently in charge of lower league sides Credicoop San Román and Credicoop San Cristóbal before rejoining Binacional for a third spell on 29 October 2020.

On 9 December 2020, Flores renewed his contract with Binacional for a further campaign. The following 22 March, however, he left on a mutual consent.

== Honours ==
=== Manager ===
San Simón

- Copa Perú: 2013
