= Deportivo Binacional FC =

Association football club in Peru

Deportivo Binacional
- Full name: Deportivo Binacional Fútbol Club
- Nicknames: El Poderoso del Sur; El Puma del Sur
- Founded: 18 December 2010; 15 years ago
- Ground: Estadio Guillermo Briceño Rosamedina
- Capacity: 20,030
- Owner: Juan Carlos Aquino
- Manager: Claudio Bustamante
- League: Liga 2
- 2025: Liga 1, 19th of 19 (disqualified)
- Website: http://www.facebook.com/deportivobinacionalfc
Home colours	Away colours	Third colours

Deportivo Binacional Fútbol Club, formerly Escuela Municipal Deportivo Binacional, known as just Binacional, is a Peruvian professional football club from Juliaca in the Puno Region. The team plays in the Peruvian Primera División after being reinstated by the Peruvian Football Federation in 2025.

== History ==
=== Founding ===
The club was founded on 18 December 2010, by the mayor of the Desaguadero District, Juan Carlos Aquino, under the name Club Deportivo Binacional de Desaguadero. The district is close to the Peru–Bolivia border and thus was called Binacional, or Bi-national in English.

=== Copa Perú ===
The club debuted in the Liga Superior de Puno of the 2011 Copa Perú tournament and finished fourth in the standings with 14 points.

The following year, the club finished second in the Liga Superior de Puno with 21 points and advanced to the Departmental Stage where it also finished second, thus allowing them to advance to the Regional Stage. Binacional became the Region VIII champions after finishing the first of its group and beating Alfonso Ugarte from Puno in the regional finals on penalties after a 0–0 draw. They proceeded to play in the National Stage. In the Round of 16, Binacional defeated Deportivo CREDICOOP from Tacna on penalties after an aggregate score of 3–3. However, the Peruvian Football Federation's Justice Court retired the team from the tournament.

Binacional repeated a similar campaign in 2013. The club qualified to the Regional Stage and finished the first of its group of Region VIII. In the National Stage, they faced San Simón from Moquegua in the Round of 16. They won the first leg 1–0 but lost the second leg 0–2, thus eliminating them from the tournament with an aggregate score of 1–2. San Simón eventually advanced to the finals and would go on to win the tournament.

In 2014, Binacional reached the Regional Stage for the third year in a row. They finished third of their group with 7 points, behind Unión Alto Huarca from Cusco and Unión Fuerza Minera from Puno and were not able to advance to the National Stage. Later on, Fuerza Minera would become the runner-up of the tournament.

The Copa Perú restructured its format for the 2015 season. This year Binacional was eliminated in the Departmental Stage after Policial Santa Rosa from Puno defeated them on a 1–2 aggregate score.

Binacional switched its locality to the Paucarpata District in the Arequipa Region in 2016, on the orders of the club president, Juan Carlos Aquino. The team purchased the playing rights of Escuela Municipal de Paucarpata, who participated in the Liga Distrital de Paucarpata. As part of the merger, the club changed its official name to Escuela Municipal Deportivo Binacional.

That year, Binacional started its campaign winning 8 out of 9 games of the Liga Distrital de Paucarpata, scoring 70 goals and finishing first place in the standings with Luis 'Puchito' Flores as head coach. It then surpassed the Regional and Departmental stages without difficulty to reach the National Stage as Arequipa Region's runner-up. In this stage, the team won 4 games and tied 2 to finish second in the overall league standings of 50 participants and thus qualifying to the Round of 16. In this round, Binacional faced against Octavio Espinosa from Ica, winning the first leg 2–1 and the second leg 3–1 to advance to the quarter-final with an aggregate score of 5–2. Then, the team beat Carlos Orellana, also from Ica, with a 6–4 global score after winning 6–3 on the first leg of this round and losing 0–1 in the second leg, allowing them to play the final group stage or La Finalísima in Lima as one of the four best Peruvian amateur teams. It surprisingly lost 1–0 in the first match of this stage to the eventual fourth-place team Racing from Huamachuco. The second game was against eventual champion Sport Rosario from Huaraz which it lost 2–3 with an own goal by Carlos Aspilcueta at the 73rd minute. The team finished 3rd overall after beating Deportivo Hualgayoc by 1–0 and thus preventing it from winning the tournament.

=== Promotion to first division ===
Binacional had a great start to its 2017 campaign by qualifying to the departmental stage of the Copa Perú and winning all of its matches to qualify to the National Stage. In the first round of this stage, the team won four games, tied one, and lost one and placed twelfth in the standings out of 50 teams. This allowed them to play the second round where they faced against León de Huánuco for a spot in the Round of 16. Binacional won both legs, 3–1 away in Huánuco and 8–1 at home in Arequipa for a global score of 11–2.

In the Round of 16, Binacional faced against the Lima Region champion, Defensor Laure Sur. They won the first leg 4–0 and lost the second leg 1–2, thus advancing to the quarter-finals with a global score of 5–2. Then, they played against Ica Region representative Unión San Martín. The teams tied in the first leg with a score of 1–1 but Binacional was able to win on the second leg 4–1 and to reach La Finalísima once again. Their first game was a 4–1 victory against José Carlos Mariátegui from Tarapoto. It then tied 1–1 against tournament favorite Atlético Grau from Piura. This left both Atlético Grau and Binacional with the same number of points going into the last matchday. On the last matchday, Binacional won 1–0 against Estudiantil CNI from Iquitos and Atletico Grau was able to defeat José Carlos Mariátegui. However, Binacional managed a better goal difference of +5 compared to Grau's +3. As such, El Poderoso won the tournament and promotion to the 2018 Torneo Descentralizado.

=== Professional era ===
Deportivo Binacional debuted in the Peruvian first division in the first tournament of the season, the 2018 Torneo de Verano. The first match for the recently promoted club was a 0–2 loss against Cantolao. The next matchday saw the team beat Unión Comercio 2–1 in Moyobamba, in which Milton Benítez scored the first goal for Binacional and an own goal from Comercio's defender secured the club's first victory in Peruvian first division. At the end of the tournament, Binacional had won 5 matches, tied 6, and lost 3 to finish third of its group with 21 points.

Before the start of the 2018 Torneo Apertura, the team temporarily moved to Moquegua's Estadio 25 de Noviembre in an effort to attract more fans. By the end of the Torneo Apertura, the club was undefeated at this new location, winning 5 matches and tying 3. Binacional finished eighth in the standings with 23 points. Then, the team had a rough start in the 2018 Torneo Clausura which resulted in the release of head coach Luis 'Puchito' Flores. He was replaced by Mario Flores ahead of matchday 8 of the tournament, when the team was sitting at the bottom of the league table. Binacional managed to finish the tournament thirteenth in the standings with 17 points. In the aggregate table, the team placed eighth with 59 points and gained a berth for the 2019 Copa Sudamericana.

After the end of the 2018 season, the club announced that they would be moving back to the Puno Region permanently, as well as modifying their badge to include a flag of Puno and reverting to its original name Deportivo Binacional. It enrolled Estadio Guillermo Briceño Rosamedina in Juliaca as their new home stadium, at 3824 meters above sea level. However, this stadium did not meet the necessary standards established by CONMEBOL to hold an international match, and therefore El Poderoso was forced to play their home games of the 2019 Copa Sudamericana at the Estadio Monumental de la UNSA in Arequipa.

The drawing for this tournament set Binacional to face Independiente from Argentina for the first stage. The club's first game in an international competition was a 1–4 loss in Avellaneda, with Jeferson Collazos scoring the only goal for El Poderoso. The second leg was also a loss, this time in Arequipa with a 1–2 score. Binacional was eliminated from the competition with a 2–6 aggregate score.

=== Liga 1 champions and Copa Libertadores ===
Binacional had a successful domestic campaign in 2019 where it won the Torneo Apertura with 36 points, 4 points ahead of its nearer contender, Sporting Cristal. It had an almost perfect run at home scoring 3 goal per game on average and only losing to another high-altitude team, Sport Huancayo. During this time it was led by Peruvian coach Javier Arce, who left the club after the first half of the season because of disagreements with the owners. Some of the most important players for the club during the Torneo Apertura championship campaign were under-23 player Andy Polar, Colombian striker Donald Millán, and Peruvian forward Aldair Rodríguez. Roberto Mosquera took over as the new head coach for the second half of the season. The team finished fourth in the standings of the Torneo Clausura with 28 points and qualified for the tournament semi-finals from which it received a bye into the tournament final after finishing second in the aggregate table with 64 points. This also granted Binacional the opportunity to play the 2020 Copa Libertadores, the most prestigious competition in South American club football, for the first time in its history. On 2 December 2019, a few days before the tournament final, Binacional players Juan Pablo Vergara, Donald Millán, and Jeferson Collazos were involved in an automobile accident while travelling between the cities of Puno and Juliaca. All three players were taken to the nearest hospital from which Millán and Collazos were released a few hours later without any major injuries. Vergara suffered a perforation of the liver by a broken rib, triggering a haemorrhage from which he was not able to recuperate. At 23:25 PET the club announced via social media that Vergara had died from injuries sustained during the accident. The next day the rest of the squad announced its intentions to go on with the tournament final in honor of their deceased teammate.

The first leg of the 2019 final was played on 8 December in Juliaca. Binacional won the first match by 4–1 against Alianza Lima, who finished the game with only 10 players. Ángel Ojeda, Edson Aubert, Aldair Rodríguez, and Donald Millán scored for the home team. This game was the first to incorporate the use of the video assistant referee (VAR) review system in Peru's professional league. The second leg was played a week later on 15 December in Lima which ended with at 2–0 in favor of Alianza Lima. Thus Binacional won its first Peruvian Liga 1 championship with a global score of 4–3.

Ahead of Binacional's title defence and debut Copa Libertadores campaign, key players Rodríguez, Millán, Aubert and Hervé Kambou departed to join América de Cali, Universitario, Melgar and Sport Huancayo respectively, and coach Roberto Mosquera was appointed by Sporting Cristal. With this significantly weakened squad, as well as the refusal of the Peruvian government to allow the club to play its home Libertadores matches in Juliaca (Binacional was only permitted to play in Lima due to the COVID-19 pandemic in Peru), the team's continental participation was a dismal one, including home and away defeats to River Plate by scorelines of 6–0 and 8–0, a 5–1 loss in Brazil against São Paulo and another defeat against LDU Quito, losing 4–0. Binacional scored three goals and conceded 25, only winning one of their six group matches and losing the other five. Binacional set a negative record in the history of Libertadores: it became the club with the worst goal difference in the history of the continental tournament's group stage, with -22, surpassing the previous record of -18, which belonged to 9 de Octubre, from Ecuador (1966), Deportivo Italia (1985) and Zamora (2015), both from Venezuela. The 2020 Liga 1 season was also fairly unsuccessful, as the club could only finish the campaign in 13th position.

=== Relegation to Liga 2 ===
In 2023, they once again had a poor campaign, similar to 2021. In the 2023 Copa Sudamericana, they were eliminated in the Preliminary Stage by Universidad César Vallejo with a 3–1 scoreline. Returning to Liga 1, their performance was disappointing in both short tournaments. They reached the final matchday needing a home victory against Melgar; however, they lost 1–2. With Unión Comercio and Sport Boys both winning their matches, Binacional were relegated to Liga2 for the following year.

=== 2025 ===
The club was reinstated in the league after winning judicial cases against the Peruvian Football Federation, which increased the number of teams to 19.

On 19 August 2025, the Peruvian Football Federation officially announced the exclusion of Binacional from 2025 Liga 1 and the 2025 Torneo Juvenil Sub-18, following a court ruling that annulled the injunction which had allowed the club to return to the first division after its relegation in 2023. In its statement, the FPF stated that the Juliaca-based team would be informed about its participation in future tournaments in due course.

== Kits and crest ==
Binacional has used a sky blue shirt and shorts combination since its inception. Their away kit is a darker shade of blue for the shirt and pants. The crest is composed of a parted coat of arms. The bottom of half is a stylized sun above the waves of Lake Titicaca. The top half consisted of the flag of the Arequipa Region. After the team returned to the Puno Region, the top half was changed to the flag of that region. The coat of arms is supported by two Pumas with an Adidas Telstar and three golden stars for a crown.

== Stadium ==
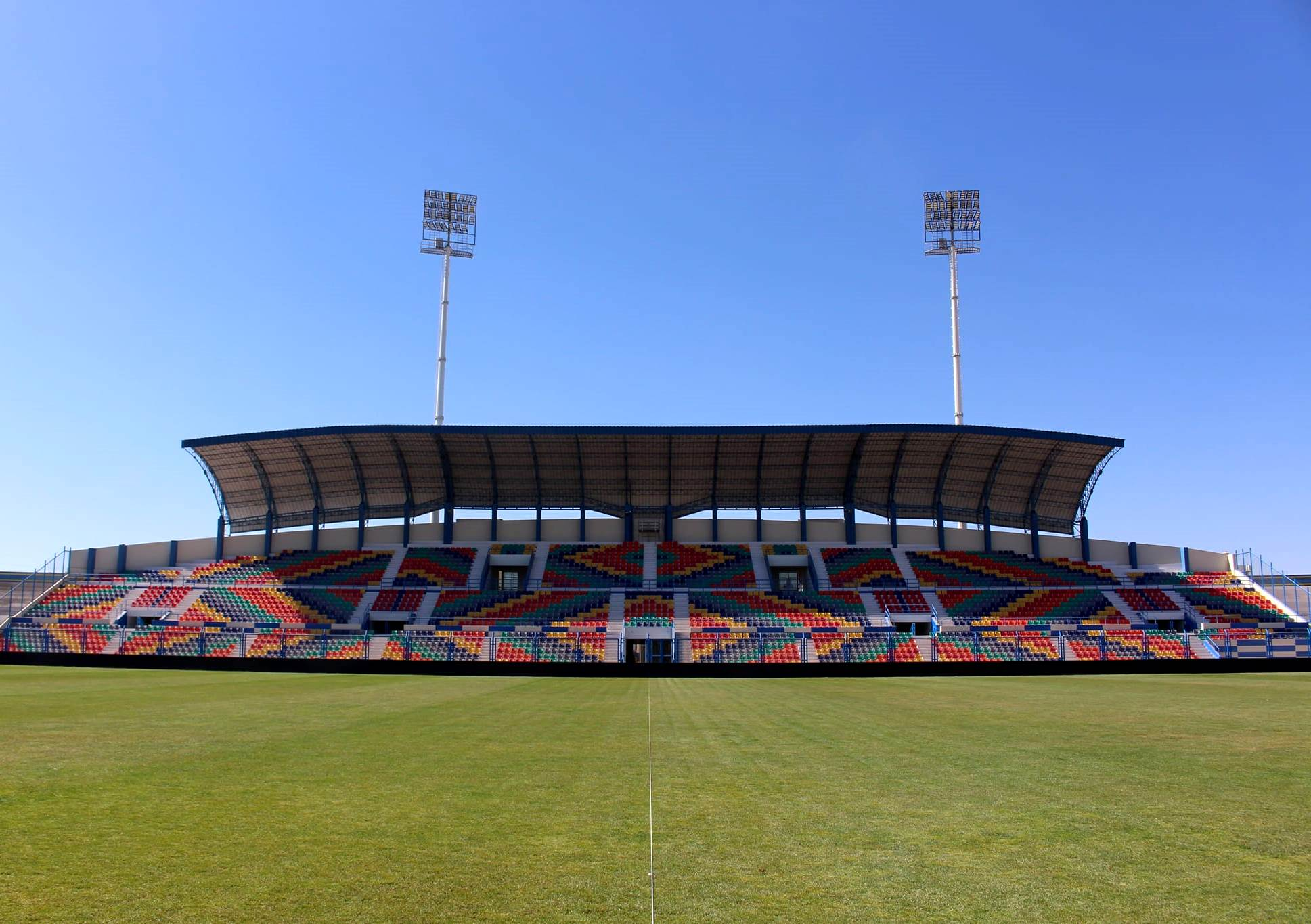
Estadio Guillermo Briceño Rosamedina

Estadio Guillermo Briceño Rosamedina has been Binacionals home stadium since 2018. Located in Juliaca, it has a capacity of 20,030 spectators. As a result of Binacionals promotion to the Primera División in 2019, the stadium was remodeled and expanded. The new remodeled stadium added artificial lighting, better infrastructure, as well as meeting all the requirements required by Conmebol so that matches of South American competitions can be played.

== Honours ==
=== Senior titles ===
Keys

- Record
- ^{(s)} Shared record

Type	Competition	Titles	Runner-up	Winning years	Runner-up years
National (League)	Liga 1	1	—	2019	—
National (League)	Copa Perú	1	—	2017	—
Half-year / Short tournament (League)	Torneo Apertura	1	—	2019	—
National (Cups)	Supercopa Peruana	—	1	—	2020
Regional (League)	Región VIII	1	1	2012	2013
Regional (League)	Liga Departamental de Arequipa	1	1	2017	2016
Regional (League)	Liga Departamental de Puno	2	1	2013, 2014	2012
Regional (League)	Liga Provincial de Arequipa	1	—	2016	—
Regional (League)	Liga Provincial de Chucuito	3	—	2013, 2014, 2015	—
Regional (League)	Liga Superior de Puno	—	1	—	2012
Regional (League)	Liga Distrital de Paucarpata	1	—	2016	—
Regional (League)	Liga Distrital de Desaguadero	1	—	2015	—

== Performance in CONMEBOL competitions ==
- Copa Sudamericana: 2 appearances

2019: First stage
2023: First stage

- Copa Libertadores: 1 appearance

2020: Group stage

== Players ==
=== Current squad ===
As of 4 February 2025

Note: Flags indicate national team as defined under FIFA eligibility rules; some limited exceptions apply. Players may hold more than one non-FIFA nationality.

No.	Pos.	Nation	Player
1	GK	PER	Diego Montalvo
2	DF	URU	Nicolás Rodríguez
3	DF	PER	Renato Montufar
4	MF	PER	Hairo Timaná
6	MF	PER	Luis Duque
7	MF	PER	Juan Pablo Carranza
8	MF	PER	Yorkman Tello (captain)
10	MF	COL	Róger Torres
11	DF	PER	Denylson Chávez
12	GK	PER	Jean Escalante
13	DF	PER	Arthur Gutiérrez
14	FW	PER	Michel Rasmussen
15	DF	PER	Brackson León
16	MF	PER	Joaquín Revilla

No.	Pos.	Nation	Player
17	MF	PER	Hoover Crespo
18	FW	PER	Nicolás Figueroa
19	DF	PER	Iván Quispe
20	FW	COL	Marlon Torres
21	GK	PER	Ángel Azurín
22	FW	PER	Franchesco Flores
23	DF	PER	Alex Magallanes
24	DF	PER	Juan Ayqque
25	FW	PER	Carlos Meza
26	DF	PER	Gabriel Turpo
27	MF	PER	Abraham Aguinaga
28	DF	PER	Édinson Chávez
33	FW	URU	Gabriel Leyes
38	DF	PER	Carlos Pérez

== Managers ==
Below is a list of Deportivo Binacional managers from 2018, the club's first season in the Peruvian first division, until the present day.

Name	Period
(Peru) Luis Flores	1 January 2018 – 16 October 2018
(Peru) Mario Flores	18 October 2018 – 1 December 2018
(Peru) Javier Arce	1 January 2019 – 4 September 2019
(Peru) Roberto Mosquera	19 September 2019 – 31 December 2019
(Argentina) César Vigevani	1 January 2020 – 10 February 2020
(Colombia) Flabio Torres	24 February 2020 – 8 September 2020
(Peru) Javier Arce	8 September 2020 – 26 October 2020
(Peru) Luis Flores	29 October 2020 – 22 March 2021
(Peru) César Chávez-Riva (Argentina) César Vaioli	22 March 2021 – 14 April 2021
(Argentina) Rubén Darío Insúa	14 April 2021 – 8 May 2021
(Argentina) César Vaioli	9 May 2021 – 21 May 2021
(Argentina) Carlos Desio	1 June 2021 – 3 December 2021
(Peru) Wilmar Valencia	26 January 2022 – 15 March 2023
(Peru) José Díaz	15 March 2023 – 22 March 2023
(Argentina) Darío Franco	22 March 2023 – 19 May 2023
(Peru) Aristóteles Ramos	19 May 2023 – 19 June 2023
(Argentina) Juan Manuel Azconzábal	19 June 2023 – 1 August 2023
(Argentina) César Vaioli	5 August 2023 – 8 November 2023
(Peru) Aristóteles Ramos	2024
(Peru) Erick Torres	2024
(Peru) Luis Flores	5 August 2024 – 10 September 2024
(Peru) Erick Torres	16 January 2025 – 5 April 2025
(Peru) César Chávez-Riva	5 April 2025 – 21 April 2025
(Peru) Claudio Bustamante	21 April 2025 – 19 August 2025
