= Juan Manuel Azconzábal =

Argentine footballer and coach

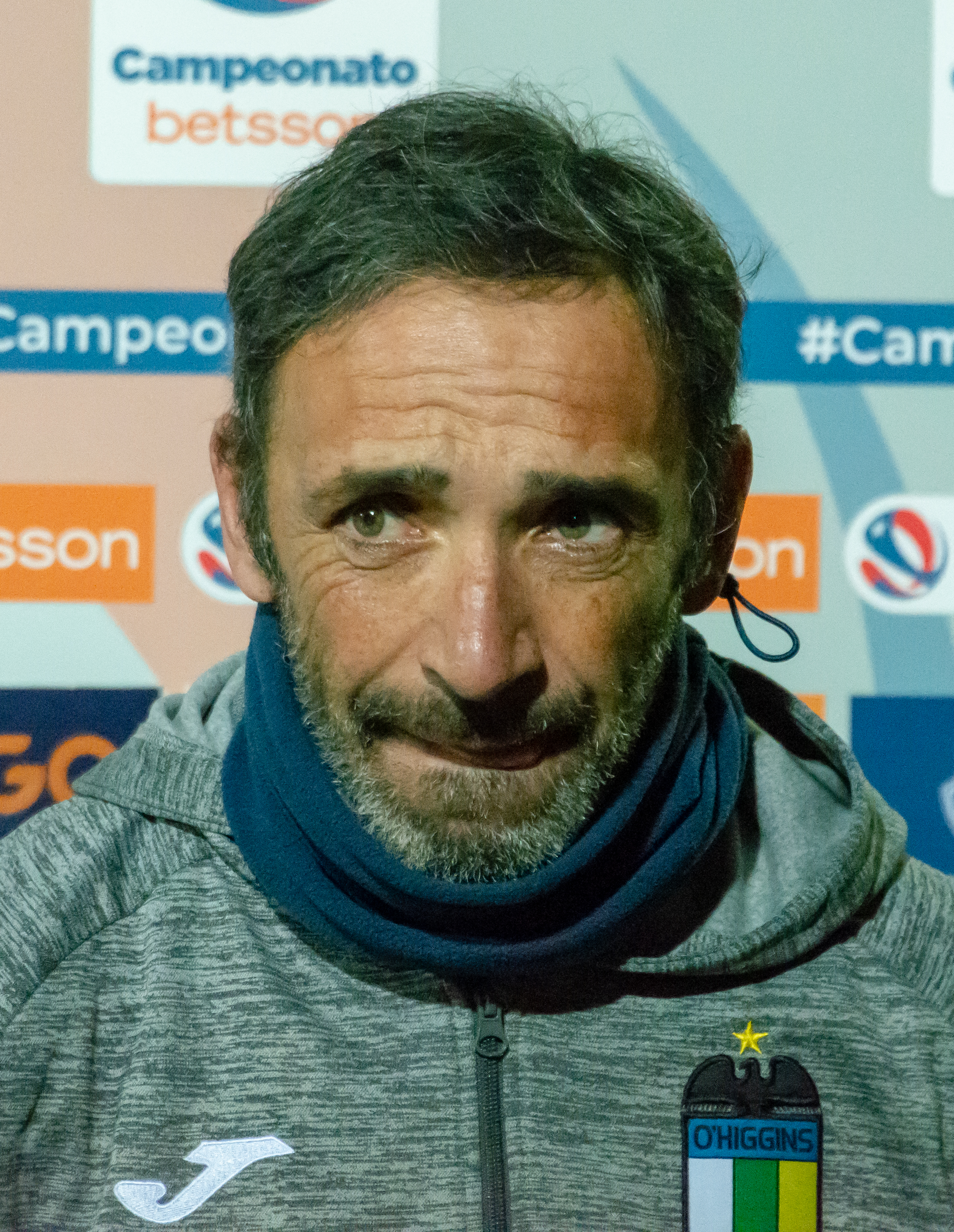
- Azconzábal with O'Higgins in 2023

Personal information
- Full name: Juan Manuel Azconzábal
- Date of birth: 8 September 1974 (age 52)
- Place of birth: Junín, Argentina
- Height: 1.86 m (6 ft 1 in)
- Position: Defender

Team information
- Current team: Chacarita Juniors (manager)

Senior career*
Years	Team	Apps	(Gls)
1994–2002	Estudiantes LP	191	(7)
2002–2003	Tecos	17	(0)
2003	Chacarita	17	(0)
2004	Universitario	10	(0)
2004	Emelec	14	(1)
2005	Banfield	11	(2)
2006	Independiente Medellín	15	(1)
2006–2007	Rosario Central	31	(0)
2008	Las Palmas	2	(0)
2008–2010	Atlético Tucumán	40	(3)

Managerial career
- 2011–2012: Estudiantes LP
- 2013–2014: San Martín de San Juan
- 2014–2016: Atlético Tucumán
- 2016–2017: Huracán
- 2018: Guaraní
- 2019–2020: Deportes Antofagasta
- 2020–2021: Unión Santa Fe
- 2022: Atlético Tucumán
- 2023: Binacional
- 2023–2024: O'Higgins
- 2025–: Chacarita Juniors
- * Club domestic league appearances and goals

Juan Manuel Azconzábal (born 8 September 1974) is an Argentine football coach and former played who played as a defender,

== Career ==
Born in Junín, Buenos Aires, Azconzábal made his debut with Estudiantes de La Plata in 1994, and played for the club until 2002. That year, Azconzábal moved to Mexico to play for Tecos. He returned to Argentina in 2003 to play for Chacarita Juniors. Azconzábal then played for Universitario in Peru and Emelec in Ecuador before returning to Argentina to play for Banfield. In 2006, he moved to Colombia to play for Independiente Medellín but returned once again to Argentina later that year to sign for Rosario Central. After a short stint in the Canary Islands with Las Palmas, he signed for Club Atlético Tucumán.

After his retirement, Azconzábal was signed by Estudiantes as manager of football operations. Upon the resignation of Miguel Angel Russo on 7 November 2011, Azconzábal was named caretaker coach, and after a string of good results he was appointed as coach for the 2012 Clausura tournament.

Azconzábal's nickname is "el vasco" (the Basque), as his surname is of Basque origin.
