= Carlos Desio =

Argentine football manager

Personal information
- Full name: Carlos Alberto Desio
- Date of birth: 25 January 1973 (age 53)
- Place of birth: Corral de Bustos, Argentina
- Position: Midfielder

Team information
- Current team: Sport Boys (manager)

Youth career
- Sporting Corral de Bustos
- 1990–1993: Independiente

Senior career*
Years	Team	Apps	(Gls)
1993–1996	Independiente	1	(0)
- Defensores de Cambaceres
- Sportivo Corral de Bustos
1999–2000	Alumni de Casilda		

Managerial career
- Sporting Corral de Bustos (youth)
- Sporting Corral de Bustos
- 2013–2015: Chile U20 (assistant)
- 2015–2017: Talleres (youth)
- 2017–2018: Argentina U17 (assistant)
- 2018: Argentina U19
- 2019: Santos (assistant)
- 2020–2021: Atlético Mineiro (assistant)
- 2021: Binacional
- 2022: Sport Huancayo
- 2023: Alianza Atlético
- 2024: ADT
- 2025: ADT
- 2025: Cienciano
- 2026–: Sport Boys
- * Club domestic league appearances and goals

Carlos Alberto Desio (born 25 January 1973) is an Argentine football manager and former player who played as a midfielder. He is the current manager of Peruvian club Sport Boys.

== Career ==
Born in Corral de Bustos, Desio played as a youth for hometown side Sporting Club de Corral de Bustos and Independiente. He made his senior debut with the latter in 1993, but played rarely before retiring from professional football due to injuries; he still played in the regional categories, being managed by his brother at Alumni de Casilda in 2000, where both met Jorge Sampaoli who was at the time manager of Aprendices Casildenses.

Desio started his managerial career at his first club Sporting Corral de Bustos, taking over the youth sides and the first team before joining Sampaoli's staff at the Chile national team in 2012, as an audiovisual analyst. He then worked as an assistant manager of Hugo Ragelli in the under-20 team before returning to his home country in 2015, as manager of Talleres de Córdoba's youth setup.

In July 2017, Desio was named Pablo Aimar's assistant at the Argentina under-17 national team. In May of the following year, he was named in charge of the under-19 side before rejoining Sampaoli's staff at Santos in December 2018.

Desio followed Sampaoli to Atlético Mineiro in the 2020 season, but left with the manager in February 2021. On 1 June, he was appointed manager of Peruvian Primera División side Binacional.

On 3 December 2021, Desio was named manager of Sport Huancayo also in the Peruvian top tier for the 2022 season. The following 9 August, after a poor start of the Clausura, he was sacked.

On 7 November 2022, Desio was named in charge of Alianza Atlético also in the Peruvian top tier. The following 11 May, he left the club on a mutual agreement.

On 11 November 2023, Desio took over fellow Peruvian side ADT. He resigned due to personal reasons on 16 June 2024, but returned to the role on 25 December.

On 16 April 2025, Desio resigned from ADT to take over Cienciano also in the Peruvian top tier. He left the latter as his contract expired on 23 November, and was announced as manager of Sport Boys the following 17 March 2026.

== Personal life ==
Desio's older brothers Hermes and Jorge also work with football. Hermes was a footballer while Jorge is Sampaoli's assistant.
