= Roberto Mosquera =

Peruvian footballer and manager (born 1956)

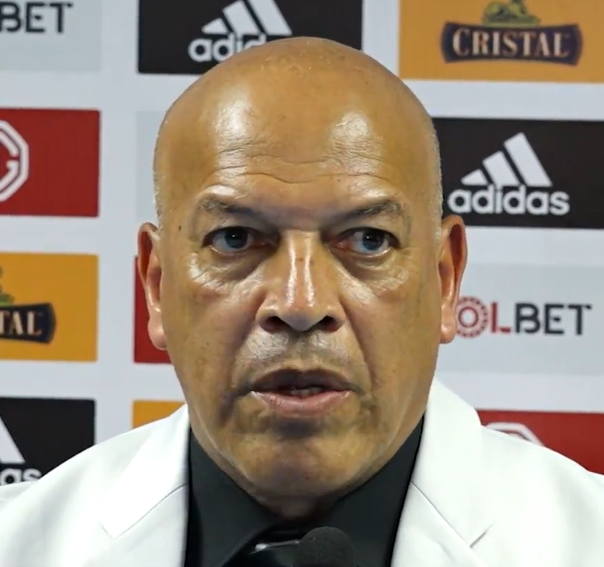
- Mosquera in 2020

Personal information
- Full name: Roberto Orlando Mosquera Vera
- Date of birth: 21 June 1956 (age 70)
- Place of birth: Ibagué, Colombia
- Position: Forward

Team information
- Current team: Sporting Cristal (manager)

Youth career
- 1967–1974: Sporting Cristal

Senior career*
Years	Team	Apps	(Gls)
1974–1980	Sporting Cristal		
1981	Talleres Córdoba		
1982–1984	Deportivo Cali	109	(11)
1985	Once Caldas	15	(2)
1986	San Agustín		
1987	Cúcuta Deportivo	5	(1)
1988	Aucas		

International career
1978–1981	Peru	16	(4)

Managerial career
- 1995: Unión Huaral
- 1996–1997: Sporting Cristal (assistant)
- 1998–1999: Alcides Vigo
- 2000: Deportivo Wanka
- 2001: Unión Minas
- 2002: Deportivo Wanka
- 2002–2004: Coronel Bolognesi
- 2004–2005: Melgar
- 2006: Sport Boys
- 2007: Deportivo Municipal
- 2008–2009: Coronel Bolognesi
- 2010: Sport Ancash
- 2010–2011: Sport Huancayo
- 2012–2013: Sporting Cristal
- 2013–2015: Juan Aurich
- 2016: Alianza Lima
- 2017: Wilstermann
- 2018–2019: Royal Pari
- 2019: Deportivo Binacional
- 2020–2022: Sporting Cristal
- 2023: Royal Pari
- 2023–2024: Universidad César Vallejo
- 2025: Alianza Universidad
- 2026: Sport Huancayo
- 2026–: Sporting Cristal
- * Club domestic league appearances and goals

Roberto Orlando Mosquera Vera (born 21 June 1956) is a Peruvian football manager and former player who manages Sporting Cristal.

A forward, Mosquera played for the Peru national team in the 1978 FIFA World Cup.

== Club career ==
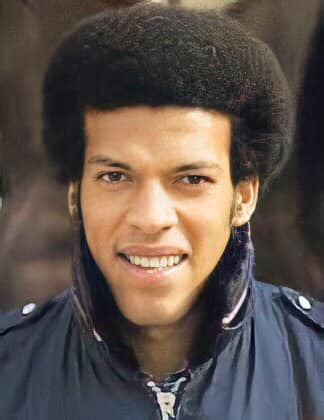
Mosquera in 1978

Mosquera was forged in the minor divisions of Sporting Cristal, influenced by two relatives who played in the club: his father, Roberto Mosquera Sr. who played for Sporting Tobacco, and his uncle Máximo Mosquera, Cristal champion in 1956. He debuted in 1974 and played 3 games that year. Mosquera was consolidated as a starter the following years and was part of the powerful team that won the Bicampeonato in 1979 and 1980.

Then he migrated to Argentina where he played for Talleres de Córdoba. He later played for clubs in Colombia, Ecuador and Peru's Deportivo San Augustine, with whom he won the 1986 championship.

== International career ==
Mosquera played for the Peruvian National Team in 16 games where scored 4 goals. He was also part of the team who participated in the World Cup 1978 and the Copa America 1979.

== Managerial career ==
His first coaching experience was at Unión Huaral, leading the team in the 1995 regular season. The following year he joined Sporting Cristal where he managed a few games as interim coach. He was assistant to Sergio Markarián in the direction of Cristal for two years, winning the Campeonato Descentralizado in 1996 and finishing as runner-up in the 1997 Copa Libertadores.

The following years he led a series of provincial teams in Peru, said its passage by Coronel Bolognesi between 2002 and 2004 which were their best seasons in which they qualified for their first international cup competition. He has also managed teams in Bolivia since 2017, starting with Jorge Wilstermann from the city of Cochabamba and Royal Pari the following year.

== Playing statistics ==
List of international goals scored by Roberto Mosquera
No.	Date	Venue	Opponent	Score	Result	Competition	Ref.
1	22 April 1978	Estadio Nacional, Lima, Peru	China	1–0	2–1	Friendly	
2	11 July 1979	Estadio Nacional, Lima, Peru	Ecuador	2–0	2–1	Friendly	
3	30 August 1979	Estadio Nacional, Lima, Peru	Uruguay	1–0	2–0	Friendly	
4	17 October 1979	Estadio Nacional, Lima, Peru	Chile	1–1	1–2	1979 Copa America	

== Honours ==
=== Player ===
Sporting Cristal

- Torneo Descentralizado: 1979, 1980

San Agustín

- Torneo Descentralizado: 1986

=== Assistant manager ===
Sporting Cristal

- Torneo Descentralizado: 1996

=== Manager ===
Sporting Cristal

- Peruvian Primera División: 2012, 2020
- Copa Bicentenario: 2021
- Torneo Apertura: 2021
- Torneo Clausura runner-up: 2020
- Copa de la Liga: 2026

Juan Aurich

- Peruvian Primera División runner-up: 2014
- Torneo Apertura: 2014

Deportivo Binacional

- Peruvian Primera División: 2019
