= Cusco FC =

Association football club in Peru

Cusco
- Full name: Cusco Fútbol Club
- Nicknames: Guerreros dorados La máquina dorada El Imperio dorado Los cusqueños Los dorados
- Founded: 28 August 2008; 18 years ago as Real Garcilaso
- Ground: Estadio Garcilaso
- Capacity: 45,056
- President: Julio Gerardo Vásquez Granilla
- Manager: Miguel Rondelli
- League: Liga 1
- 2025: Liga 1, 2nd of 19
- Website: www.cuscofc.com
Home colours	Away colours	Third colours

Cusco Fútbol Club (known as Real Garcilaso until 2019), commonly known as Cusco, or Cusco FC, is a Peruvian professional football club based in the city of Cusco, that currently competes in the Peruvian Primera División, the top tier of Peruvian football. It was founded on 28 August, 2008 as Real Garcilaso, changing their name to Cusco FC in 2019.

Cusco were runner-up of the Primera División four times in 2012, 2013, 2017, and 2025, and won the Segunda División in 2022, getting promoted after being relegated in 2021. They also won the Copa Perú in 2011. Cusco became one of the fastest clubs in Peru to reach the Primera División, doing so in only two years after its founding.

== History ==
=== Beginnings ===
Cusco Fútbol Club was founded on July 16, 2009 under the name Asociación Civil Real Atlético Garcilaso, or Real Garcilaso, by an initiative of Julio Vásquez Granilla and students of the Inca Garcilaso de la Vega school, in the city of Cusco. The club is one of few the Peruvian teams that has its own institutional headquarters called Casa Dorada, located in the Huancaro urbanization.

In its first year in the Segunda Distrital del Cusco, it was champion thus ascending to the Liga Distrital del Cusco. The first match of the light blue team was on September 6, 2009, defeating Cedecam World Vision 5-2. In this way, it could participate in the Copa Perú. During the year 2010 it was district, provincial, and departmental champion of Cusco. That same year, they reached the National Stage of the Copa Perú, where they were eliminated by Sportivo Huracán.

=== Promotion to the Primera División ===
Prior to the start of their participation in the Copa Perú, the club played the Intermediate Tournament, where they reached the quarterfinals, being eliminated by Sport Ancash. However, they eliminated important teams such as Deportivo Garcilaso, Cienciano and Universidad Técnica de Cajamarca.

They began their journey in the 2011 Copa Perú from the Regional Stage, since the previous year they had been eliminated in the National Stage. In their group, they finished first and accessed the National Stage for the second time in their history. They reached all the way to the final of the tournament where they were crowned champions in Lima after defeating Pacífico 3-2 on aggregate. In this way, Real Garcilaso gained access to the Peruvian Primera División for the first time.

=== Primera División ===
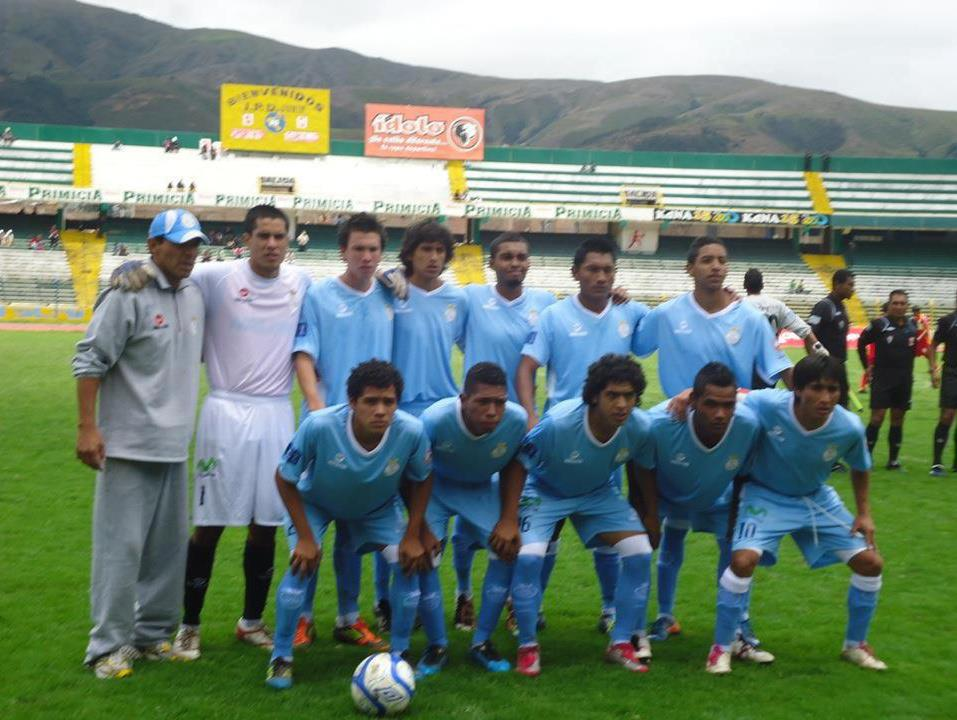
Real Garcilaso reserve team

In their first season in topflight, the club had a successful campaign with Andy Pando who was the tournament's top goal scorer, and made it to the final where it was defeated by Sporting Cristal. It also qualified for the 2013 Copa Libertadores, the most prestigious tournament in South American, after being placed second on the aggregate table. The club surprised again by reaching the quarter-finals but was eliminated by Colombian team Santa Fe. The tournament was Real Garcilaso's best result in an international competition.

In 2012, the club opened its training ground and headquarters in the Oropreza District, becoming one of the few clubs in Peru to properly own their own training ground. According to the IFFHS club ranking, Real Garcilaso was the best Peruvian team between 2012 and 2013. Its position worldwide in 2013 was 103.

In 2013, They reached the final for the second year in a row and qualified for the 2014 Copa Libertadores after finishing as the top club during the tournament's first stage. In the Liguilla A, the club fought against Sporting Cristal for a spot in the finals which they played against Universitario. After winning at home and losing away, a third match was played in which they lost the play-offs 4–5 on penalties.

In the 2014 Copa Libertadores, according to Soccerly, Cruzeiro player Paulo César Fonseca do Nascimento (better known as Tinga) was subjected to racist abuse at the game against Real Garcilaso in Huancayo. The South American Football Federation (CONMEBOL) tweeted that they would “handle this situation and any pertinent sanctions.” The club ended up getting eliminated in the Group Stage.

In 2017, the club were runner-up again and qualified for the 2018 Copa Libertadores where they were eliminated in the Group Stage. The next year, the team qualified for the Copa libertadores again but were eliminated by Deportivo La Guaira in the qualifying stage. On 23 December 2019, Real Garcilaso announced its name change to Cusco Fútbol Club, better known as Cusco FC.

In the 2021 season, the team finished next to last and was relegated to the Liga 2. In the 2022 Liga 2 season, Cusco won the league and got promoted back to the Liga 1, where they currently still stand.

== Kit and crest ==
Cusco's home kit is a light brown shirt and shorts like the color of the club shield. The club's second kit is similar to the home kit but with white and black instead of brown. Cusco also has a third kit that is black and orange.

Cusco used to use a shield with a G in the middle and a crown on top from its foundation until 2020. The badge was very similar to that of Real Madrid CF. To avoid conflicts with Deportivo Garcilaso, another club from Cusco with a similar shield and name, it was decided to change the name and shield on January 19, 2020. The current shield has in the background the Incan Citadel Machu Picchu, the rising sun which was a deity of the Inca Empire and a gold ring where its name is found.

== Stadium ==
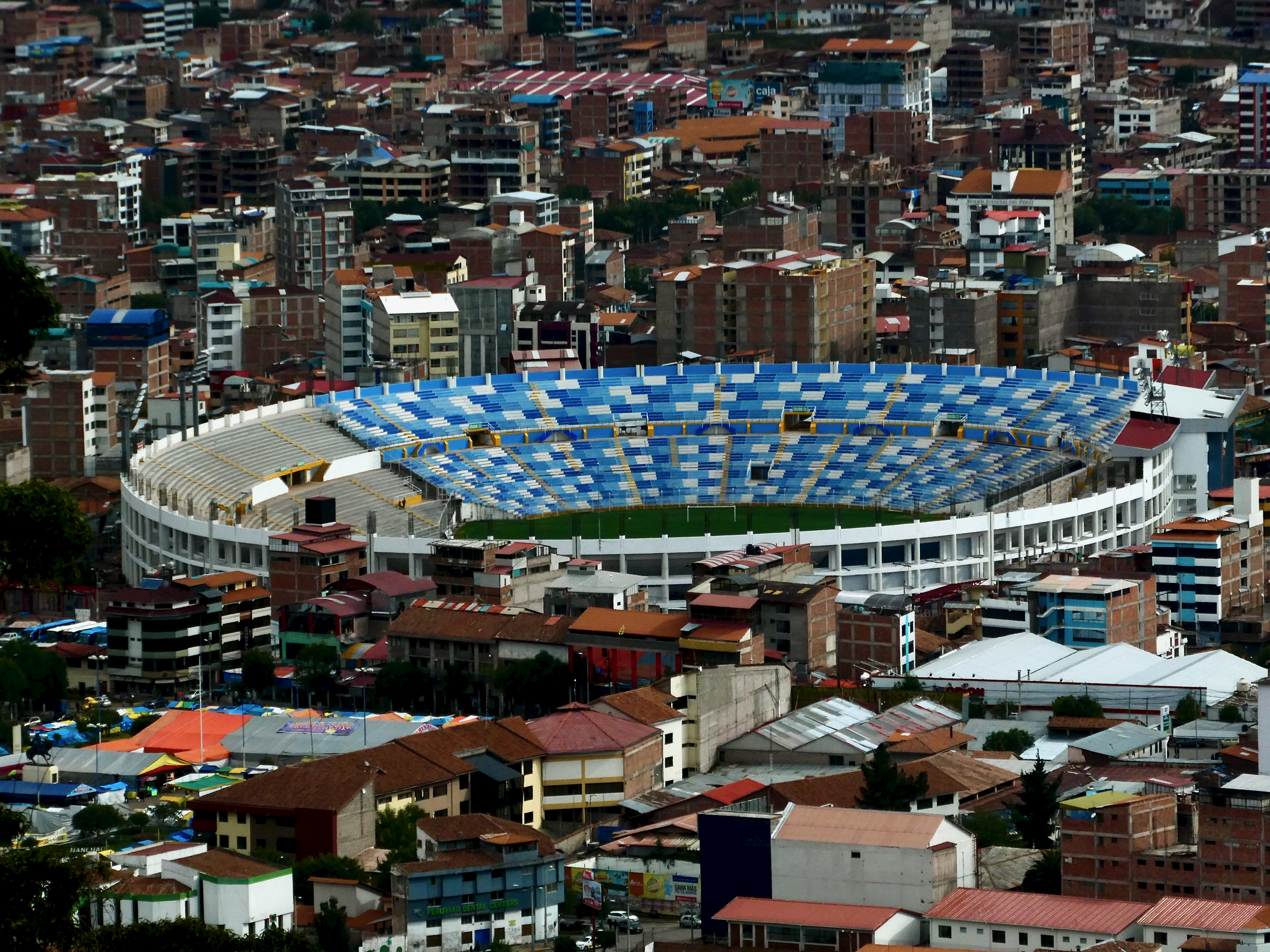
Estadio Garcilaso

Cusco FC play their home games in Estadio Garcilaso de la Vega which located in Cusco. It was named after the Peruvian writer Inca Garcilaso de la Vega. When first inaugurated in 1950, it had a spectator capacity of 22,000 and had a running track. In 2004, the stadium's capacity was expanded to 42,000, losing its running track. Because of Cienciano's success in international tournaments and it would be a venue in the 2004 Copa América. Cusco also plays some games at Estadio Túpac Amaru in Sicuani.

In June 2015, the club opened its sports complex in the Oropeza district, 25 km from the city of Cusco. The area has three football fields dedicated to training for the senior team and the minor divisions, and also has a covered area called Casa Dorada, which has gyms, a concentration area and a press and meeting area. With these works, the team joined the small number of clubs in Peru that have their own sports complex.

== Rivalries ==
Cusco FC has a rivalry with other Cusco clubs, Deportivo Garcilaso and Cienciano. This rivalry is known as the Clásico Cusqueño. The three clubs share the same home stadium, Estadio Garcilaso.

== Current squad ==
As of 16 March, 2026.

Note: Flags indicate national team as defined under FIFA eligibility rules; some limited exceptions apply. Players may hold more than one non-FIFA nationality.

No.	Pos.	Nation	Player
1	GK	PER	Rodolfo Anderson
2	DF	PER	Carlos Gamarra
4	DF	VEN	Álex Custodio
5	MF	PER	Miguel Aucca (captain)
6	DF	PER	Álvaro Ampuero
7	FW	PER	José Manzaneda
8	MF	PER	Aldair Fuentes
9	FW	ARG	Facundo Callejo
10	MF	ARG	Iván Colman
11	FW	ARG	Juan Manuel Tévez
13	GK	PER	Andy Vidal
14	MF	PER	Carlo Diez
15	DF	PER	José Bolívar
16	MF	PER	Oswaldo Valenzuela

No.	Pos.	Nation	Player
17	FW	PER	José Alí
21	DF	PER	José Zevallos
22	MF	ARG	Lucas Colitto
24	DF	PER	Marlon Ruidías
26	FW	ARG	Nicolás Silva
27	MF	ARG	Gabriel Carabajal
28	GK	PER	Pedro Díaz
30	FW	PER	Sergio Quillahuaman
32	DF	PER	Julinho Astudillo (on loan from Universitario)
33	GK	PER	Alessandro Cavagna
37	DF	PER	Gu-Rum Choi
77	FW	PER	Joel Herrera (on loan from Sporting Cristal)
88	MF	PER	Diego Soto

== Honours ==
=== Senior titles ===
Keys

- Record
- ^{(s)} Shared record

Type	Competition	Titles	Runner-up	Winning years	Runner-up years
National (League)	Liga 1	—	4	—	2012, 2013, 2017, 2025
National (League)	Liga 2	1	—	2022	—
National (League)	Copa Perú	1	—	2011	—
Half-year / Short tournament (League)	Torneo Apertura	—	1	—	2017
Half-year / Short tournament (League)	Torneo Clausura	—	3	—	2015, 2017, 2025
Half-year / Short tournament (League)	Torneo Apertura (Liga 2)	1	—	2022	—
Half-year / Short tournament (League)	Torneo Clausura (Liga 2)	1	—	2022	—
Regional (League)	Región VIII	1	1	2011	2010
Regional (League)	Liga Departamental del Cusco	1	—	2010	—
Regional (League)	Liga Provincial del Cusco	1	—	2010	—
Regional (League)	Liga Distrital del Cusco	1	—	2010	—
Regional (League)	Segunda Distrital del Cusco	1	—	2009	—

== Performance in CONMEBOL competitions ==
- Copa Libertadores: 5 appearances

2013: Quarterfinals
2014: Group Stage
2018: Group Stage
2019: First Stage
2026: Group Stage

- Copa Sudamericana: 3 appearances

2016: Second Stage
2020: First Stage
2025: First Stage

Competition	A	P	W	D	L	GF	GA
Copa Libertadores	4	24	7	4	13	18	35
Copa Sudamericana	1	4	1	1	2	4	5

A = appearances, P = matches played, W = won, D = drawn, L = lost, GF = goals for, GA = goals against.

Season	Competition	Round		Club	Home	Away
2013	Copa Libertadores	Group Stage	(Colombia)	Santa Fe	1–1	0–2
2013	Copa Libertadores	Group Stage	(Colombia)	Deportes Tolima	0–3	1–0
2013	Copa Libertadores	Group Stage	(Paraguay)	Cerro Porteño	5–1	1–0
2013	Copa Libertadores	R2	(Uruguay)	Nacional	1–0	0–1 (pen. 4–1)
2013	Copa Libertadores	QF	(Colombia)	Santa Fe	1–3	0–2
2014	Copa Libertadores	Group Stage	(Brazil)	Cruzeiro	2–1	3–0
2014	Copa Libertadores	Group Stage	(Uruguay)	Defensor Sporting	0–2	4–1
2014	Copa Libertadores	Group Stage	(Chile)	Universidad de Chile	1–2	1–0
2016	Copa Sudamericana	First Stage	(Ecuador)	Aucas	1–0	1–2
2016	Copa Sudamericana	Second Stage	(Chile)	Palestino	2–2	0–1
2018	Copa Libertadores	Group Stage	(Brazil)	Santos	2–0	0–0
2018	Copa Libertadores	Group Stage	(Argentina)	Estudiantes	0–0	0–3
2018	Copa Libertadores	Group Stage	(Uruguay)	Nacional	0–0	0–4
2019	Copa Libertadores	First Stage	(Venezuela)	Deportivo La Guaira	1–0	2–1

== Managers ==
- (Peru) Roberto Arrelucea (Jan 1, 2010–Dec 20, 2010)
- (Peru) Freddy García (Jan 1, 2011–14)
- (Peru) Luis Flores (2014)
- (Argentina) Mariano Soso (2015)
- (Uruguay) Tabaré Silva (2015)
- (Peru) Jorge Espejo (2016)
- (Peru) Wilmar Valencia (2016)
- (Peru) Duilio Cisneros (2017)
- (Argentina) Gustavo Coronel (2017)
- (Argentina) Marcelo Grioni (2017)
- (Peru) Óscar Ibáñez (2018)
- (Uruguay) Tabaré Silva (2018)
- (Peru) Victor Reyes (2018)

== See also ==
- List of football clubs in Peru
- Peruvian football league system
