= 2003 Cienciano season =

Cienciano
2003 season
- Chairman: Juvenal Silva
- Manager: Édgar Ospina (until May); Freddy Ternero
- Torneo Descentralizado: Full Table: 7th *Apertura: 4° *Clausura: 8°
- Copa Sudamericana: Champion
Home colours

The 2003 season was Cienciano's season since its founding in 1901. The club participated in the 2003 Torneo Descentralizado and 2003 Copa Sudamericana. This season was one of the most successful seasons for Cienciano as they won the 2003 Copa Sudamericana, the first and only international title for a Peruvian club.

== Statistics ==
Last updated in January 2003.

No.	Pos	Nat	Player	Total		Copa Sudamericana		Primera División	
No.	Pos	Nat	Player	Apps	Goals	Apps	Goals	Apps	Goals
1	GK	(Peru) PER	Óscar Ibáñez	0	0	-	-	-	-
2	DF	(Peru) PER	Santiago Acasiete	0	0	-	-	-	-
3	MF	(Peru) PER	Martín Raúl García	0	0	-	-	-	-
4	DF	(Peru) PER	Carlos Maldonado	0	0	-	-	-	-
5	MF	(Paraguay) PAR	Carlos Lugo	0	0	-	-	-	-
6	MF	(Peru) PER	César Ccahuantico	0	0	-	-	-	-
7	FW	(Uruguay) URU	Ernesto Zapata	0	0	-	-	-	-
8	MF	(Peru) PER	Juan Carlos Bazalar	0	0	-	-	-	-
9	FW	(Peru) PER	Germán Carty	9	5	9	5	-	-
10	FW	(Peru) PER	Paolo Maldonado	0	0	-	-	-	-
11	FW	(Peru) PER	Ramón Rodríguez	0	0	-	-	-	-
12	GK	(Peru) PER	Maurinho Mendoza	0	0	-	-	-	-
13	DF	(Peru) PER	Giuliano Portilla	0	0	-	-	-	-
14	MF	(Peru) PER	Juan Carlos La Rosa	0	0	-	-	-	-
15	DF	(Peru) PER	Alessandro Morán	0	0	-	-	-	-
16	MF	(Peru) PER	Julio García	0	0	-	-	-	-
17	DF	(Peru) PER	Miguel Llanos	0	0	-	-	-	-
18	MF	(Peru) PER	Carlos Ibarra	0	0	-	-	-	-
19	FW	(Colombia) COL	Rodrigo Saraz	0	0	-	-	-	-
20	MF	(Peru) PER	Carlos Lobatón	0	0	-	-	-	-
21	GK	(Peru) PER	Alexander Araujo	0	0	-	-	-	-
22	FW	(Peru) PER	Roberto Holsen	0	0	-	-	-	-
23	DF	(Peru) PER	Carlos García	0	0	-	-	-	-
24	DF	(Peru) PER	Néstor Candia	0	0	-	-	-	-
25	MF	(Peru) PER	Jean Garrafa	0	0	-	-	-	-
7	FW	(Peru) PER	Abel Augusto Lobatón	0	0	-	-	-	-

== 2003 Copa Sudamericana ==
=== Preliminary Chile/Peru ===
Date	Opponents	H / A	Result F – A	Scorers	Attendance
7 Aug. 2003	(Peru) Alianza Lima	H	1 – 0	Martín Raúl García 9'
26 Ayg. 2003	(Peru) Alianza Lima	A	0 – 1	Roberto Holsen 22'
25 Sep. 2003	(Chile) Universidad Católica	H	4 – 0	Carty 1', Cristian Álvarez (o.g.) 38', Acasiete 55', Paolo Maldonado 69'
2 Oct. 2003	(Chile) Universidad Católica	A	1 – 3	Cristian Álvarez (o.g.) 9'

=== Quarter-finals ===
Date	Opponents	H / A	Result F – A	Scorers	Attendance
16 Oct. 2003	(Brazil) Santos FC	A	1 – 1	Alex (o.g.) 71'
29 Oct. 2003	(Brazil) Santos FC	H	2 – 1	Carty 11', 34'

=== Semi-finals ===
Date	Opponents	H / A	Result F – A	Scorers	Attendance
13 Nov. 2003	(Colombia) Atlético Nacional	A	2 – 1	Carty 29', Paolo Maldonado 84'
4 Dec. 2003	(Colombia) Atlético Nacional	H	1 – 0	Carty 1'

=== Finals ===
Date	Opponents	H / A	Result F – A	Scorers	Attendance
10 Dec. 2003	(Argentina) Club Atlético River Plate	A	3–3	Portilla 26', 79' Carty 67'
19 Dec. 2003	(Argentina) Club Atlético River Plate	H	1–0	Lugo 78'

== Peruvian Primera División ==
=== Torneo Apertura ===
Pos	Team	Pld	W	D	L	GF	GA	GD	Pts	Qualification
3	Coronel Bolognesi	22	9	8	5	30	22	+8	35	
4	Cienciano	22	10	4	8	31	22	+9	34	2003 Copa Sudamericana qualifying round
5	Sport Boys	22	8	7	7	34	28	+6	31	

==== Results ====
Home \ Away	AAS	ALI	ATL	CIE	BOL	WAN	EST	MEL	SBA	CRI	HUA	UNI
Alianza Atlético				2–1								
Alianza Lima				0–0								
Atlético Universidad				3–4								
Cienciano	0–0	1–0	2–0		3–0	0–1	3–0	2–1	1–0	2–2	3–0	2–0
Coronel Bolognesi				2–1								
Deportivo Wanka				3–2								
Estudiantes de Medicina				2–1								
Melgar				3–0								
Sport Boys				1–0								
Sporting Cristal				1–0								
Unión Huaral				0–0								
Universitario				1–3								

Updated to match(es) played on 2003. Source:
Legend: Blue = home team win; Yellow = draw; Red = away team win.

Copa Sudamericana 2003 qualifying

6 July 2003	Cienciano	1–1	Sporting Cristal	Estadio Garcilaso, Cusco
	Lugo 90' (pen.)		Junior 80'

9 July 2003	Sporting Cristal	1–2	Cienciano	Estadio Nacional, Lima

=== Torneo Clausura ===
Pos	Team	Pld	W	D	L	GF	GA	GD	Pts
7	Unión Huaral	15	6	3	6	12	17	−5	21
8	Cienciano	14	4	3	7	17	20	−3	15
9	Atlético Universidad	14	4	3	7	10	18	−8	15

==== Results ====
Home \ Away	AAS	ALI	ATL	CIE	BOL	WAN	EST	MEL	SBA	CRI	HUA	UNI
Alianza Atlético				4–1								
Alianza Lima												
Atlético Universidad												
Cienciano	1–1					3–0		2–1	1–1	3–4		2–0
Coronel Bolognesi				2–0								
Deportivo Wanka												
Estudiantes de Medicina				2–3								
Melgar				1–0								
Sport Boys												
Sporting Cristal												
Unión Huaral				2–1								
Universitario				1–0								

Updated to match(es) played on 2003. Source: RSSSF Peru 2003
Legend: Blue = home team win; Yellow = draw; Red = away team win.
