= 2003 Copa Sudamericana finals =

- Event: 2003 Copa Sudamericana
River Plate	Cienciano
(Argentina)	(Peru)
3	4
- on aggregate

First leg
River Plate	Cienciano
3	3
- Date: 10 December 2003
- Venue: Estadio Monumental, Buenos Aires
- Referee: Carlos Eugênio Simon (Brazil)

Second leg
Cienciano	River Plate
1	0
- Date: 19 December 2003
- Venue: Estadio Universidad de San Agustín, Arequipa
- Referee: Gustavo Méndez (Uruguay)

The 2003 Copa Sudamericana finals was a two-legged football match, contested between Argentine club River Plate and Peruvian side Club Sportivo Cienciano to determine the champion of the 2003 Copa Sudamericana.

In the first leg, held in Estadio Monumental in Buenos Aires, both teams tied 3–3. In the second leg held in Estadio Universidad de San Agustín in Arequipa, Cienciano won 1–0 and therefore the Peruvian squad crowned champion of the competition after winning 4–1 on points (4–3 on aggregate).

== Qualified teams ==
Team	Previous finals app.
(Argentina) River Plate	None
(Peru) Cienciano	None

== Route to the final ==
River Plate				Round	Cienciano			
Opponent	Agg.	1st leg	2nd leg		Opponent	Agg.	1st leg	2nd leg
Bye				Preliminary stage	(Peru) Alianza Lima	2–0	1–0 (H)	1–0 (A)
(Argentina) Independiente	8–1	4–1 (A)	4–0 (H)	Second stage	(Chile) Universidad Católica	5–3	4–0 (H)	1–3 (A)
(Paraguay) Libertad	2–1	2–0 (H)	0–1 (A)	Quarter-finals	(Brazil) Santos	3–2	1–1 (A)	2–1 (H)
(Brazil) São Paulo	3–3 (p)	3–1 (H)	0–2 (A) (a.e.t.)	Semi-finals	(Colombia) Atlético Nacional	3–1	2–1 (A)	1–0 (H)

== Match details ==
=== First leg ===
2003 Copa Sudamericana finals
10 December 2003
21:10 (UTC-3)
First leg

River Plate (Argentina)	3–3	(Peru) Cienciano
Maxi López 28', 50'; Salas 85'	Report	Portilla 26', 79'; Carty 67'

Estadio Monumental, Buenos Aires
Attendance: 65,000
Referee: Carlos Eugênio Simon (Brazil)

River Plate	Cienciano

=== Second leg ===
19 December 2003
19:10 (UTC-3)
Second leg

Cienciano (Peru)	1–0	(Argentina) River Plate
Lugo 78'	Report

Estadio Universidad de San Agustín, Arequipa
Attendance: 45,000
Referee: Gustavo Méndez (Uruguay)

Cienciano	River Plate

GK	1	(Peru) Óscar Ibáñez	Booked
DF	15	(Peru) Alessandro Morán	Booked
DF	2	(Peru) Santiago Acasiete
DF	5	(Paraguay) Carlos Lugo
DF	13	(Peru) Giuliano Portilla
MF	8	(Peru) Juan Carlos Bazalar	(substituted off) 90'
MF	14	(Peru) Juan Carlos La Rosa	Sent off (straight red)
MF	10	(Peru) Paolo Maldonado	(substituted off) 58'
MF	16	(Peru) Julio García	Sent off (straight red)
FW	19	(Colombia) Rodrigo Saraz	(substituted off) 83'
FW	9	(Peru) Germán Carty	Booked
Substitutions:
MF	6	(Peru) César Ccahuantico	(substituted on) 58'
DF	3	(Peru) Martín García	(substituted on) 83'
MF	17	(Peru) Miguel Llanos	(substituted on) 90'
Manager:
(Peru) Freddy Ternero

GK	17	(Argentina) Franco Costanzo
DF	21	(Argentina) Horacio Ameli
DF	25	(Argentina) Eduardo Tuzzio	Booked
DF	13	(Argentina) Ricardo Rojas	Booked
MF	8	(Argentina) Eduardo Coudet
MF	15	(Argentina) Javier Mascherano
MF	2	(Argentina) Oscar Ahumada	(substituted off) 85'
MF	24	(Argentina) Lucho González	(substituted off) 76'
MF	16	(Argentina) Marcelo Gallardo
FW	11	(Chile) Marcelo Salas	(substituted off) 16'
FW	23	(Argentina) Maxi López	Booked
Substitutions:
MF	10	(Argentina) Daniel Montenegro	(substituted on) 16'
FW	7	(Argentina) Alejandro Domínguez	(substituted on) 76'
MF	22	(Argentina) Daniel Ludueña	(substituted on) 85'
Manager:
(Chile) Manuel Pellegrini
