= 2004 Cienciano season =

Cienciano
2004 season
- Manager: Freddy Ternero
- Stadium: Garcilaso
- Torneo Descentralizado: 1st (Aggregate table)
- Copa Libertadores: Group stage
- Recopa Sudamericana: Champion
Home colours

The 2004 season was Cienciano's 103rd season since its founding in 1901. The club played the Torneo Descentralizado, the Copa Libertadores and the Recopa Sudamericana.

== Competitions ==
=== Torneo Descentralizado ===
==== Torneo Apertura ====
Pos	Team	Pld	W	D	L	GF	GA	GD	Pts
1	Alianza Lima	26	19	4	3	48	16	+32	61
2	Cienciano	26	18	3	5	53	28	+25	57
3	Alianza Atlético	26	15	5	6	46	29	+17	50

Results

Home \ Away	AAS	ALI	ATL	CIE	BOL	WAN	EST	MEL	SBA	CRI	HUA	UCV	USM	UNI
Alianza Atlético				2–4										
Alianza Lima				0–1										
Atlético Universidad				2–3										
Cienciano	1–2	1–0	4–0		3–2	2–1	4–0	4–0	4–1	1–0	3–1	2–2	1–0	1–1
Coronel Bolognesi				2–4										
Deportivo Wanka				0–3										
Grau–Estudiantes				0–1										
Melgar				2–0										
Sport Boys				1–2										
Sporting Cristal				3–0										
Unión Huaral				0–2										
Universidad César Vallejo				2–1										
Universidad San Martín				1–1										
Universitario				3–0										

Updated to match(es) played on 2004. Source: RSSSF Peru 2004
Legend: Blue = home team win; Yellow = draw; Red = away team win.

==== Torneo Clausura ====
Pos	Team	Pld	W	D	L	GF	GA	GD	Pts
2	Universidad San Martín	26	14	5	7	40	26	+14	47
3	Cienciano	26	11	11	4	41	26	+15	44
4	Universitario	26	11	10	5	34	28	+6	43

Results

Home \ Away	AAS	ALI	ATL	CIE	BOL	WAN	EST	MEL	SBA	CRI	HUA	UCV	USM	UNI
Alianza Atlético				3–3										
Alianza Lima				0–0										
Atlético Universidad				4–1										
Cienciano	1–0	2–2	2–2		2–1	0–0	2–0	1–0	6–2	2–2	3–0	4–0	0–0	2–0
Coronel Bolognesi				1–1										
Deportivo Wanka				1–0										
Grau–Estudiantes				1–0										
Melgar				2–3										
Sport Boys				1–1										
Sporting Cristal				1–2										
Unión Huaral				1–1										
Universidad César Vallejo				0–1										
Universidad San Martín				1–1										
Universitario				1–0										

Updated to match(es) played on 2004. Source: RSSSF Peru 2004
Legend: Blue = home team win; Yellow = draw; Red = away team win.

=== Copa Libertadores ===
Group stage

Pos	Team	Pld	W	D	L	GF	GA	GD	Pts	NAC	IND	CIE	ELN
1	(Uruguay) Nacional	6	3	3	0	7	4	+3	12			1–0	
2	(Argentina) Independiente	6	2	2	2	9	7	+2	8			4–2	
3	(Peru) Cienciano	6	2	1	3	10	12	−2	7	1–2	3–2		1–0
4	(Ecuador) El Nacional	6	1	2	3	6	9	−3	5			3–3	

Legend: Blue = home team win; Yellow = draw; Red = away team win.

=== Recopa Sudamericana ===
Cienciano defeated Boca Juniors on penalties and was champion of the tournament.

September 7, 2004 2004 Recopa Sudamericana	Cienciano (Peru)	1–1 (4–2 p)	(Argentina) Boca Juniors	Lockhart Stadium, Fort Lauderdale
20:30 (UTC-4)	Saraz 89'	Report	Tevez 33'	Attendance: 7,000; Referee: Terry Vaughn (United States)
	Penalties
	(penalty scored) Ibarra; (penalty scored) Lobatón; (penalty scored) Portilla; (penalty scored) Acasiete		Schiavi (penalty scored); Tevez (penalty missed); Palermo (penalty scored); Vargas (penalty missed)
