= 2003 Torneo Descentralizado =

Torneo Descentralizado
- Season: 2003
- Dates: 1 March 2003 – 4 February 2004
- Champions: Alianza Lima; 20th Primera División title
- Runner up: Sporting Cristal
- Copa Libertadores: Alianza Lima; Sporting Cristal; Cienciano
- Copa Sudamericana: Alianza Atlético; Coronel Bolognesi
- Top goalscorer: Luis Alberto Bonnet (20 goals)

The 2003 Torneo Descentralizado (known as the Copa Cable Mágico for sponsorship reasons) was the eighty-seventh season of top-flight Peruvian football. A total of 12 teams competed in the tournament, with Sporting Cristal as the defending champion. Alianza Lima won its twentieth Primera División title after beating Sporting Cristal in the final playoff.

== Changes from 2002 ==
=== Structural changes ===
Starting in the 2003 season, half-year champions had to finish in the top six of each tournament to dispute the national title instead of the top four. A Copa Sudamericana qualifying round was disputed between the top four of the Torneo Clausura. No relegation took place at the end of the season due to a player's strike during the Clausura. The player's strike also caused an international qualifying round be played between the top five of the aggregate table who had not already qualified to an international tournament for 2004.

=== Promotion and Relegation ===
Juan Aurich and Coopsol Trujillo finished the 2002 season in 11th and 12th place, respectively, on the three-season average table and thus were relegated to their regional leagues. They were replaced by the champion of the 2002 Copa Perú Atlético Universidad and the 2002 Segunda División champion Unión Huaral.

=== Team changes ===
Promoted from 2002 Segunda División	Promoted from 2002 Copa Perú	Relegated from 2002 Primera División
▲ Unión Huaral (1st)	▲ Atlético Universidad (1st)	▼ Juan Aurich (10th) ▼ Coopsol Trujillo (12th)

== Teams ==
Locations of the 2003 Primera División teams

Team	City	Stadium	Capacity
Alianza Atlético	Sullana	Campeones del 36	8,000
Alianza Lima	Lima	Alejandro Villanueva	35,000
Atlético Universidad	Arequipa	Monumental UNSA	45,000
Cienciano	Cuzco	Garcilaso	42,056
Coronel Bolognesi	Tacna	Jorge Basadre	19,850
Deportivo Wanka	Huancayo	Huancayo	20,000
Estudiantes de Medicina	Ica	José Picasso Peratta	8,000
Melgar	Arequipa	Mariano Melgar	20,000
Sport Boys	Callao	Miguel Grau	18,000
Sporting Cristal	Lima	San Martín de Porres	15,000
Unión Huaral	Huaral	Julio Lores Colan	10,000
Universitario	Lima	Monumental	80,093

== Torneo Apertura ==
=== Standings ===
Pos	Team	Pld	W	D	L	GF	GA	GD	Pts	Qualification
1	Sporting Cristal	22	15	4	3	50	20	+30	49	2004 Copa Libertadores group stage
2	Alianza Lima	22	14	4	4	40	20	+20	46	2003 Copa Sudamericana qualifying round
3	Coronel Bolognesi	22	9	8	5	30	22	+8	35	2003 Copa Sudamericana qualifying round
4	Cienciano	22	10	4	8	31	22	+9	34	2003 Copa Sudamericana qualifying round
5	Sport Boys	22	8	7	7	34	28	+6	31	
6	Alianza Atlético	22	7	8	7	29	28	+1	29	
7	Unión Huaral	22	8	5	9	28	40	−12	29	
8	Universitario	22	7	7	8	32	35	−3	28	
9	Melgar	22	5	7	10	20	30	−10	22	
10	Estudiantes de Medicina	22	6	3	13	23	35	−12	21	
11	Deportivo Wanka	22	4	7	11	22	31	−9	19	
12	Atlético Universidad	22	4	6	12	25	43	−18	18	

Updated to match(es) played on June 2003. Source: Peruvian Football Apertura 2003
Rules for classification: 1) points; 2) goal difference; 3) number of goals scored.

=== Results ===
Home \ Away	AAS	ALI	ATL	CIE	BOL	WAN	EST	MEL	SBA	CRI	HUA	UNI
Alianza Atlético		1–2	4–1	2–1	1–1	2–0	1–0	2–0	1–1	0–0	2–2	1–1
Alianza Lima	1–2		1–0	0–0	5–1	2–0	2–1	2–0	2–1	3–0	3–0	1–0
Atlético Universidad	1–1	2–1		3–4	0–1	1–0	0–1	3–0	1–0	1–4	2–2	1–1
Cienciano	0–0	1–0	2–0		3–0	0–1	3–0	2–1	1–0	2–2	3–0	2–0
Coronel Bolognesi	3–1	2–2	2–2	2–1		2–2	2–1	0–2	1–1	1–0	2–0	2–0
Deportivo Wanka	1–2	0–2	3–0	3–2	1–2		3–1	0–1	0–0	0–3	1–2	2–2
Estudiantes de Medicina	3–1	0–1	2–0	2–1	0–1	1–1		3–1	3–2	0–1	1–1	0–1
Melgar	3–1	0–0	2–2	3–0	1–1	1–1	1–1		1–2	1–2	1–0	0–0
Sport Boys	2–2	2–2	1–0	1–0	2–2	1–0	3–1	1–1		3–2	5–0	4–3
Sporting Cristal	1–0	5–2	5–0	1–0	2–0	1–1	2–1	4–0	2–1		6–1	4–1
Unión Huaral	1–0	0–2	3–2	0–0	2–2	2–1	4–1	1–0	2–1	1–2		3–1
Universitario	3–2	2–4	3–3	1–3	3–0	1–1	3–0	2–0	1–0	1–1	2–1	

Updated to match(es) played on 2003. Source: RSSSF Peru 2003
Legend: Blue = home team win; Yellow = draw; Red = away team win.

=== Copa Sudamericana 2003 qualifying ===
==== First leg ====
6 July 2003
15:30

Cienciano	1–1	Sporting Cristal
Carlos Lugo 90' (pen.)		Sérgio Junior 80'

Estadio Garcilaso, Cusco
Attendance: 22,000
Referee: Manuel Garay
6 July 2003
15:30

Alianza Lima	0–0	Coronel Bolognesi

Estadio Alejandro Villanueva, Lima
Attendance: 2,566
Referee: Albert Caballero

==== Second leg ====
9 July 2003
14:00

Coronel Bolognesi	1–2	Alianza Lima
Marco Ruiz 44'		Ernesto Arakaki 71'; Antonio Serrano 80'

Estadio Jorge Basadre, Tacna
Referee: Víctor Hugo Rivera
9 July 2003
15:00

Sporting Cristal	1–2	Cienciano
Flavio Maestri 25'		Santiago Acasiete 23'; Ramón Rodríguez 89'

Estadio San Martín de Porres, Lima
Attendance: 8,000
Referee: Gilberto Hidalgo

Cienciano and Alianza Lima qualified to the 2003 Copa Sudamericana, which Cienciano went on to win.

== Torneo Clausura ==
A strike by professional players cut the Clausura short. Most matches of Rounds 16 and 17 were played with under-20 and amateur players, but were later annulled. These are not included in the table below.

=== Standings ===
Pos	Team	Pld	W	D	L	GF	GA	GD	Pts	Qualification
1	Alianza Lima	15	10	4	1	29	9	+20	34	2004 Copa Libertadores group stage
2	Alianza Atlético	15	8	5	2	25	13	+12	29	
3	Sporting Cristal	15	7	6	2	29	18	+11	27	
4	Sport Boys	15	8	3	4	27	17	+10	27	
5	Coronel Bolognesi	15	8	1	6	24	18	+6	25	
6	Melgar	15	7	1	7	26	22	+4	22	
7	Unión Huaral	15	6	3	6	12	17	−5	21	
8	Cienciano	14	4	3	7	17	20	−3	15	
9	Atlético Universidad	14	4	3	7	10	18	−8	15	
10	Universitario	15	3	4	8	12	21	−9	13	
11	Deportivo Wanka	15	3	4	8	11	24	−13	13	
12	Estudiantes de Medicina	15	1	3	11	10	35	−25	6	

Updated to match(es) played on November 2003. Source: Peruvian Football Apertura 2003
Rules for classification: 1) points; 2) goal difference; 3) number of goals scored.

=== Results ===
Home \ Away	AAS	ALI	ATL	CIE	BOL	WAN	EST	MEL	SBA	CRI	HUA	UNI
Alianza Atlético		—	—	4–1	3–2	—	3–1	2–1	2–0	1–1	1–1	2–0
Alianza Lima	2–0		5–0	1–0	2–1	2–1	—	—	1–0	2–2	3–0	1–1
Atlético Universidad	0–0	—		—	1–2	1–0	0–0	1–2	—	—	2–0	2–0
Cienciano	1–1	—	—		—	3–0	—	2–1	1–1	3–4	—	2–0
Coronel Bolognesi	—	—	1–2	2–0		—	0–1	3–0	—	0–4	0–1	3–1
Deportivo Wanka	0–2	1–0	1–1	—	1–1		2–0	—	0–4	—	0–3	1–1
Estudiantes de Medicina	—	0–0	—	2–3	1–4	0–4		—	2–2	1–2	—	1–2
Melgar	1–3	1–1	1–0	1–0	—	4–0	4–0		2–3	—	—	4–1
Sport Boys	—	1–3	1–0	—	0–1	—	5–0	3–2		1–1	1–0	—
Sporting Cristal	—	—	3–0	0–0	1–3	2–0	3–1	3–1	2–4		1–1	—
Unión Huaral	1–0	0–4	2–0	2–1	—	0–0	1–0	0–1	—	—		—
Universitario	1–1	1–2	—	1–0	0–1	—	—	—	0–1	0–0	3–0	

Updated to match(es) played on 2003. Source: RSSSF Peru 2003
Legend: Blue = home team win; Yellow = draw; Red = away team win.

== Final playoff ==
While not officially the Clausura champions because of the strike, Alianza Lima was leading the tournament, as well as the aggregate table, so a final playoff against the Apertura winners Sporting Cristal was held in January 2004, once the strike was called off.

31 January 2004
19:30
Final

Alianza Lima	2–1 (a.e.t.)	Sporting Cristal
Roberto Silva 31'; Jefferson Farfán 91'		Jorge Soto 27'

Estadio Nacional, Lima
Attendance: 25,188
Referee: Víctor Hugo Rivera

== Aggregate table ==
Pos	Team	Pld	W	D	L	GF	GA	GD	Pts	Qualification or relegation
1	Alianza Lima (C)	37	24	8	5	69	29	+40	80	2004 Copa Libertadores group stage
2	Sporting Cristal	37	22	10	5	79	38	+41	76	2004 Copa Libertadores group stage
3	Coronel Bolognesi	37	17	9	11	54	50	+4	60	2004 Copa Libertadores qualifying group
4	Sport Boys	37	16	10	11	61	45	+16	58	2004 Copa Libertadores qualifying group
5	Alianza Atlético	37	15	13	9	54	41	+13	58	2004 Copa Libertadores qualifying group
6	Unión Huaral	37	14	8	15	40	57	−17	50	2004 Copa Libertadores qualifying preliminary
7	Cienciano	36	14	7	15	48	42	+6	49	2004 Copa Libertadores qualifying preliminary
8	Melgar	37	12	8	17	46	52	−6	44	
9	Universitario	37	10	11	16	44	56	−12	41	
10	Atlético Universidad	36	8	9	19	35	61	−26	33	
11	Deportivo Wanka	37	7	11	19	33	55	−22	32	
12	Estudiantes de Medicina	37	7	6	24	10	35	−25	27	

Updated to match(es) played on November 2003. Source: Peruvian Football Apertura 2003
Rules for classification: 1) points; 2) goal difference; 3) number of goals scored.
(C) Champions

== 2004 international qualifying ==
After the strike was called off in January 2004, it was decided that, since the tournament had not been completed, a qualifying tournament would decide the allocation of the third Peruvian berth for the Copa Libertadores 2004. The tournament was to include four teams, in principle from the third to the sixth teams according to the aggregate table. But since Cienciano had played one match less and would have surpassed Unión Huaral had they won it, a preliminary playoff was held between them. Sport Boys withdrew from the tournament in disagreement with the decision. Had the Clausura Rounds 16 and 17 not been annulled, the team would have been third in the aggregate table, and could have claimed the remaining berth. Also, some teams saw the tournament as a way to favor Cienciano, who had just won the Copa Sudamericana 2003, to give them a chance at representing Peru at the Copa Libertadores.

=== Qualifying preliminary ===
22 January 2004
15:30
First leg

Unión Huaral	2–2	Cienciano
Antonio Meza Cuadra 5'; Johnny Vegas 49' (pen.)		Germán Carty 39'; Sergio Ibarra 76'

Estadio Julio Lores Colan, Huaral
Attendance: 3,200
Referee: David Morales
25 January 2004
15:00
Second leg

Cienciano	2–0	Unión Huaral
Germán Carty 2'; Sergio Ibarra 80'

Estadio Garcilaso, Cusco
Attendance: 14,000
Referee: Freddy Arellanos

=== Qualifying group ===
Pos	Team	Pld	W	D	L	GF	GA	GD	Pts	Qualification
1	Cienciano	2	2	0	0	3	0	+3	6	Copa Libertadores 2004 preliminary round
2	Alianza Atlético	2	1	0	1	1	1	0	3	2004 Copa Sudamericana preliminary phase
3	Coronel Bolognesi	2	0	0	2	0	3	−3	0	2004 Copa Sudamericana preliminary phase
4	Sport Boys	0	0	0	0	0	0	0	0	Withdrew

Updated to match(es) played on November 2003. Source:
Rules for classification: 1) points; 2) goal difference; 3) number of goals scored.

==== Results ====
29 January 2004
19:30
Round 1

Alianza Atlético	1–0	Coronel Bolognesi
Pedro García 56' (pen.)

Estadio Nacional, Lima
Attendance: 2,000
Referee: Manuel Garay
1 February 2004
15:00
Round 2

Cienciano	1–0	Alianza Atlético
César Balbín 89'

Estadio Nacional, Lima
Attendance: 15,000
Referee: Eduardo Lecca
4 February 2004
19:30
Round 3

Coronel Bolognesi	0–2	Cienciano
		Santiago Acasiete 21'; Germán Carty 26'

Estadio Nacional, Lima
Attendance: 10,000
Referee: Gilberto Hidalgo

== Top goalscorers ==
20 goals

- (Argentina) Luis A. Bonnet (Sporting Cristal)

19 goals

- (Peru) Pedro García (Alianza Atlético)

17 goals

- (Argentina) Sergio Ibarra (Estudiantes, Unión Huaral, Cienciano)

15 goals

- (Peru) Paul Cominges (Universitario de Deportes)

14 goals

- (Peru) Carlos Orejuela (Sport Boys)

== See also ==
- 2003 Peruvian Segunda División
- 2003 Copa Perú
