= 2003 FBC Melgar season =

FBC Melgar
2003 season
- Stadium: Estadio Melgar; Estadio Monumental Virgen de Chapi
- Torneo Descentralizado: Torneo Apertura: Nineth (9°); Torneo Clausura: Sixth (6°); Aggregate Table: Eighth (8°); Eighth National (8°)
Home colours	Away colours	Third colours

The 2003 FBC Melgar season were the Eighty-Nineth (89.º) of the club from its foundation in 1915, Thirty-Four (34) participations in the top-flight of Peruvian Primera División (of 87 Editions) with denomination Torneo Descentralizado. In Previous Season the club qualified as 7th Place of the 2002 Torneo Descentralizado.

Melgar were a of twelve (12) clubs in the Thirty-Eighth edition (38.º) Torneo Descentralizado, the competition most important of the Peruvian football. The club played the Peruvian Primera División.

== Torneo Descentralizado ==
=== Torneo Apertura ===
Pos	Team	Pld	W	D	L	GF	GA	GD	Pts
9	Universitario	22	7	7	8	32	35	-3	28
10	FBC Melgar	22	5	7	10	20	30	-10	22
11	Estudiantes de Medicina	22	6	3	13	23	35	-12	21

== See also ==
- FBC Melgar
- 2003 Torneo Descentralizado
