= Cienciano in South American football =

Peruvian professional football club Cienciano has participated in 12 editions of club competitions governed by CONMEBOL, the chief authority in South American football. These include 6 seasons in the Copa Libertadores, 5 seasons in the Copa Sudamericana, and 1 match in the Recopa Sudamericana. The club plays its home matches at the Estadio Garcilaso but has used the Estadio Monumental Virgen de Chapi on more than one occasion for international competitions. They are the only Peruvian football club to have won CONMEBOL-sanctioned international competitions having won both the Copa Sudamericana and the Recopa Sudamericana in 2003 and 2004 respectively.

== Overall ==
Tournament	S	Pld	W	D	L	GF	GA	GD
Copa Libertadores	6	36	12	4	20	45	62	–17
Copa Sudamericana	5	22	10	5	5	29	22	+7
Recopa Sudamericana	1	1	0	1	0	1	1	0

== Matches ==
=== Copa Libertadores ===
Season	Stage	Opponent	Home	Away	Aggregate
2002	Group Stage	12 de Octubre	3–0	0–1	2nd of 4
2002	Group Stage	Oriente Petrolero	2–0	1–3	2nd of 4
2002	Group Stage	Gremio	2–1	0–2	2nd of 4
2002	Round of 16	Club América	0–1	1–4	1–5
2004	Group Stage	Independiente	3–2	2–4	3rd of 4
2004	Group Stage	El Nacional	1–0	3–3	3rd of 4
2004	Group Stage	Nacional	1–2	0–1	3rd of 4
2005	Preliminary Round	Guadalajara	1–3	1–5	2–8
2006	Group Stage	Guadalajara	0–1	0–0	4th of 4
2006	Group Stage	São Paulo	0–2	1–4	4th of 4
2006	Group Stage	Caracas	2–1	0–1	4th of 4
2007	Group Stage	Toluca	1–2	0–3	3rd of 4
2007	Group Stage	Boca Juniors	3–0	0–1	3rd of 4
2007	Group Stage	Bolívar	5–1	3–2	3rd of 4
2008	First Stage	Montevideo Wanderers	1–0	0–0	1–0
2008	Group Stage	Nacional	2–1	1–3	3rd of 4
2008	Group Stage	Flamengo	0–3	1–2	3rd of 4
2008	Group Stage	Coronel Bolognesi	1–0	0–0	3rd of 4

=== Copa Sudamericana ===
Season	Stage	Opponent	Home	Away	Aggregate
2003	First Stage	Alianza Lima	1–0	1–0	2–0
2003	Second Stage	Universidad Católica	4–0	1–3	5–3
2003	Quarter-finals	Santos	2–1	1–1	3–2
2003	Semi-finals	Atletico Nacional	1–0	2–1	3–1
2003	Finals	River Plate	1–0	3–3	4–3
2004	First Stage	Carabobo FC	6–1	2–1	8–2
2004	Second Stage	LDU Quito	2–2	0–4	2–6
2009	First Stage	Liverpool Montevideo	2–0	0–0	2–0
2009	Round of 16	San Lorenzo	0–2	0–3	0–5
2022	First Stage	Melgar	1–1	0–1	1–2

=== Recopa Sudamericana ===
Season	Stage	Opponent	Date	Venue	Score	Ref
2004	Final	(Argentina) Boca Juniors	7 Sept. 2004	Lockhart Stadium, Fort Lauderdale, Florida	1–1 (4–2 p.)	
