= 2002 Sporting Cristal season =

Sporting Cristal
2002 season
- Stadium: San Martín de Porres, Lima
- Torneo Descentralizado: Torneo Apertura: Third (3°); Torneo Clausura: First (1°) Champion; Aggregate Table: Second (2°); Champions National (1°)
Home colours	Away colours	Third colours

The 2002 Sporting Cristal season were the Forty-Seventh (47.º) of the club from its foundation in 1955, Forty-Seven (47) participations consecutives in the top-flight of Peruvian Primera División (of 86 Editions) with denomination Torneo Descentralizado. In Previous Season the club qualified as 3rd Place of the 2001 Torneo Descentralizado.

Sporting Cristal were a of twelve (12) clubs in the Thirty-Seventh edition (37.º) Torneo Descentralizado, the competition most important of the Peruvian football. The club played the Peruvian Primera División and Copa Libertadores for Twenty-Second (22nd) Time. Sporting Cristal won their 14th Torneo Descentralizado Title.

== Torneo Descentralizado ==
=== Torneo Apertura ===
Pos	Team	Pld	W	D	L	GF	GA	GD	Pts
2	Alianza Lima	22	14	5	3	43	23	+20	47
3	Sporting Cristal	22	11	5	6	43	32	+11	38
4	Cienciano	22	9	7	6	33	31	+2	34

== See also ==
- Club Sporting Cristal
- 2002 Torneo Descentralizado
