= 2003 Sporting Cristal season =

Sporting Cristal
2003 season
- Stadium: San Martín de Porres, Lima
- Torneo Descentralizado: Torneo Apertura: First (1°) Champion; Torneo Clausura: Third (3°); Aggregate Table: Second (2°); Final Nacional: Runner-up (2°); Runner-up National (2°)
Home colours	Away colours	Third colours

The 2003 Sporting Cristal season were the Forty-Eighth (48.º) of the club from its foundation in 1955, Forty-Eight (48) participations consecutives in the top-flight of Peruvian Primera División (of 87 Editions) with denomination Torneo Descentralizado. In Previous Season the club qualified as Champions National 1st Place of the 2002 Torneo Descentralizado.

Sporting Cristal were a of twelve (12) clubs in the Thirty-Eighth edition (38.º) Torneo Descentralizado, the competition most important of the Peruvian football. The club played the Peruvian Primera División and Copa Libertadores for Twenty-Third (23rd) Time.

== Torneo Descentralizado ==
=== Torneo Apertura ===
Pos	Team	Pld	W	D	L	GF	GA	GD	Pts
1	Sporting Cristal	22	15	4	3	50	20	+30	49
2	Alianza Lima	22	14	4	4	40	20	+20	46
3	Coronel Bolognesi	22	9	8	5	30	22	+8	35

== See also ==
- Club Sporting Cristal
- 2003 Torneo Descentralizado
