= 2003 Club Atlético Universidad season =

Club Atlético Universidad
2003 season
- Stadium: Estadio Monumental Virgen de Chapi
- Torneo Descentralizado: Torneo Apertura: Twelfth (12°); Torneo Clausura: Nineth (9°); Aggregate Table: Tenth (10°); Tenth National (10°)

The 2003 Atlético Universidad season were the Fortieth (40.º) of the club from its foundation in 1964, One (1) participation in the top-flight of Peruvian Primera División] (of 87 Editions) with denomination Torneo Descentralizado. In Previous Season the club were Champions of the 2001 Copa Perú.

Atlético Universidad were a of twelve (12) clubs in the Thirty-Eighth edition (38.º) Torneo Descentralizado, the competition most important of the Peruvian football. The club played the Peruvian Primera División.

== Torneo Descentralizado ==
=== Torneo Apertura ===
Pos	Team	Pld	W	D	L	GF	GA	GD	Pts
11	Deportivo Wanka	22	4	7	11	22	31	-9	19
12	Atletico Universidad	22	4	6	12	25	43	-18	18

== See also ==
- Atlético Universidad
- 2003 Torneo Descentralizado
