= 2004 Recopa Sudamericana =

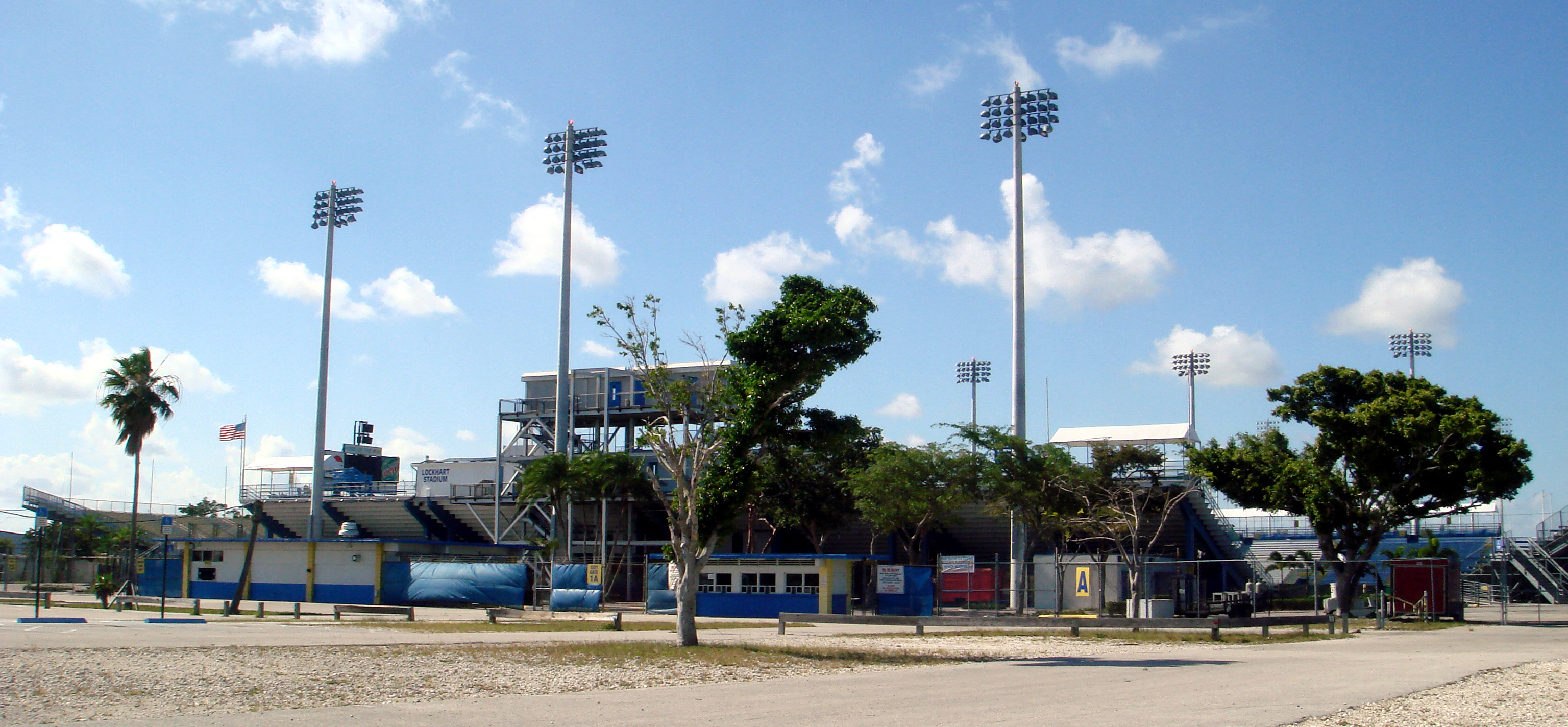
- Lockhart Stadium, venue
- Event: Recopa Sudamericana
Cienciano	Boca Juniors
(Peru)	(Argentina)
1	1
- Cienciano won 4–2 on penalties
- Date: September 7, 2004
- Venue: Lockhart Stadium, Fort Lauderdale
- Referee: Terry Vaughn (United States)
- Attendance: 7,000

The 2004 Recopa Sudamericana was the 12th Recopa Sudamericana, an annual football match between the winners of the previous season's Copa Libertadores and Copa Sudamericana competitions.

The match was contested by Boca Juniors, winners of the 2003 Copa Libertadores, and Cienciano, winners of the 2003 Copa Sudamericana, on December 10, 2004. Cienciano managed to defeat Boca Juniors 2–4 on penalties after a 1–1 tie to win their first Recopa and obtain their second international title.

== Qualified teams ==
Team	Previous finals app.
(Argentina) Boca Juniors	**1990**
(Peru) Cienciano	None

Bold indicates winning years

== Match details ==
2004 Recopa Sudamericana
September 7, 2004
20:30 (UTC-4)

Cienciano (Peru)	1–1	(Argentina) Boca Juniors
Saraz 89'	Report	Tevez 33'
Penalties
(penalty scored) Ibarra; (penalty scored) Lobatón; (penalty scored) Portilla; (penalty scored) Acasiete	4–2	Schiavi (penalty scored); Tevez (penalty missed); Palermo (penalty scored); Vargas (penalty missed)

Lockhart Stadium, Fort Lauderdale
Attendance: 7,000
Referee: Terry Vaughn (United States)

**Cienciano**	**Boca Juniors**

GK	1	(Peru) Óscar Ibáñez (c)	(yellow card) 33'
DF	15	(Peru) Alessandro Morán	(yellow card) 14' (substituted off) 60b'
DF	2	(Peru) Santiago Acasiete
DF	4	(Colombia) Manuel Arboleda	(yellow card) 7'
DF	13	(Peru) Giuliano Portilla
MF	8	(Peru) Juan Carlos Bazalar
MF	14	(Peru) Juan Carlos La Rosa
MF	25	(Peru) Paolo de la Haza
MF	10	(Uruguay) Daniel Gamarra	(yellow card) 89'
FW	7	(Peru) Miguel Mostto	(yellow card) 33' (substituted off) 60a'
FW	9	(Peru) Germán Carty	(substituted off) 73'
Substitutes:
FW	19	(Colombia) Rodrigo Saráz	(substituted on) 60a'
MF	20	(Peru) Carlos Lobatón	(substituted on) 60b'
FW	11	(Argentina) Sergio Ibarra	(substituted on) 73'
Manager:
(Peru) Freddy Ternero

GK	1	(Argentina) Roberto Abbondanzieri
DF	4	(Argentina) José María Calvo
DF	2	(Argentina) Rolando Schiavi
DF	13	(Argentina) Cristian Traverso
DF	3	(Paraguay) Claudio Morel Rodríguez
MF	8	(Argentina) Diego Cagna (c)
MF	5	(Argentina) Raúl Cascini
MF	11	(Argentina) Pablo Ledesma	(substituted off) 80'
MF	14	(Argentina) Andrés Guglielminpietro	(substituted off) 67'
FW	9	(Argentina) Martín Palermo
FW	10	(Argentina) Carlos Tevez
Substitutes:
MF	20	(Colombia) Fabián Vargas	(substituted on) 67'
DF	6	(Argentina) Aníbal Matellán	(substituted on) 80'
Manager:
(Argentina) Miguel Ángel Brindisi
