= Johnny Vegas (disambiguation) =

Johnny Vegas (born 1970), is an English comedian and actor

Johnny Vegas may also refer to:

- Johnny Vegas (musician) (born 1963), American saxophonist
- Johnny Vegas (footballer) (born 1976), Peruvian footballer

== See also ==
- Jhonattan Vegas (born 1984), Venezuelan golfer
