= 2002 FBC Melgar season =

FBC Melgar
2002 season
- Stadium: Estadio Melgar
- Torneo Descentralizado: Torneo Apertura: Seventh (7°); Torneo Clausura: Nineth (9°); Aggregate Table: Seventh (7°); Seventh National (7°)
Home colours	Away colours	Third colours

The 2002 FBC Melgar season were the Eighty-Eighth (88.º) of the club from its foundation in 1915, Thirty-Three (33) participations in the top-flight of Peruvian Primera División (of 86 Editions) with denomination Torneo Descentralizado. In Previous Season the club qualified as 7th Place of the 2001 Torneo Descentralizado.

Melgar were a of twelve (12) clubs in the Thirty-Seventh edition (37.º) Torneo Descentralizado, the competition most important of the Peruvian football. The club played the Peruvian Primera División.

== Torneo Descentralizado ==
=== Torneo Apertura ===
Pos	Team	Pld	W	D	L	GF	GA	GD	Pts
6	Juan Aurich	22	7	7	8	29	25	+4	28
7	Melgar	22	6	9	7	36	43	-7	27
8	Sport Boys	22	7	4	11	29	37	-8	25

== See also ==
- FBC Melgar
- 2002 Torneo Descentralizado
