= Mauriño Mendoza =

Peruvian footballer (born 1964)

Personal information
- Full name: Mauriño Enrique Mendoza Ísmodes
- Date of birth: 4 April 1964 (age 62)
- Place of birth: Chincha Alta, Peru
- Height: 1.84 m (6 ft 0 in)
- Position: Goalkeeper

Youth career
- Deportivo San José

Senior career*
| Years | Team | Apps | (Gls) |
| 1985 | Deportivo Junín | | |
| 1986–1987 | CNI | | |
| 1988–1993 | Alianza Lima | | |
| 1994–2003 | Cienciano | | |
- * Club domestic league appearances and goals

Mauriño Enrique Mendoza Ísmodes (born on 4 April 1964) is a Peruvian footballer who played as a goalkeeper.

He is the first cousin of Andrés Mendoza, a Peruvian international striker from the 2000s.

== Biography ==
Mauriño Mendoza began his career at Deportivo Junín in 1985. After a stint with CNI of Iquitos between 1986 and 1987, he joined Alianza Lima in 1988. The previous year, his brother, José Mendoza Ísmodes, died in a plane crash that devastated the entire Alianza team.

In 1994, he signed with Cienciano of Cusco, a year in which the club narrowly avoided relegation to the second division, only securing survival on the final day of the season. A runner-up in the Peruvian league in 2001, he played eight matches in the 2002 Copa Libertadores. The following year, he won the 2003 Copa Sudamericana with Cienciano as Óscar Ibáñez's backup goalkeeper.

After retiring, he became a goalkeeping coach.

== Honours ==
Cienciano

- Torneo Clausura: 2001-C
- Copa Sudamericana: 2003
