= César Ccahuantico =

Peruvian association football player

César Ccahuantico (born 16 July 1980) is a Peruvian former footballer who is last known to have played as a midfielder for Atlético Minero.

== Playing career ==
Ccahuantico helped Peruvian top flight side Cienciano win the 2003 Copa Sudamericana, the club's first Copa Sudamericana title. After that, he played for many Peruvian sides, with the last being Peruvian second-tier side Atlético Minero.

== Post-playing career ==
After retiring from professional football, Ccahuantico worked as a journalist.
