= Daniel Gamarra =

Uruguayan footballer (born 1978)

Daniel Gamarra (born December 9, 1978, in Montevideo, Uruguay) is a Uruguayan footballer currently playing for Bucaramanga of the Primera Division B in Colombia.

== Teams ==
- (Uruguay) Bella Vista 1999-2001
- (Uruguay) Tacuarembó 2002
- (Uruguay) Bella Vista 2003
- (Uruguay) El Tanque Sisley 2004
- (Peru) Cienciano 2004
- (Colombia) Independiente Santa Fe 2005-2006
- (Colombia) Real Cartagena 2007-2008
- (Colombia) Patriotas 2009
- (Colombia) Bucaramanga 2010–present

== Titles ==
- (Peru) Cienciano 2004 (Recopa Sudamericana)
