= Paolo Maldonado =

Peruvian footballer (born 1973)

Personal information
- Full name: Paolo Freddy Maldonado Farje
- Date of birth: 12 August 1973 (age 53)
- Place of birth: Ilo, Peru
- Height: 1.66 m (5 ft 5 in)
- Position: Midfielder

Youth career
- Universitario

Senior career*
Years	Team	Apps	(Gls)
1990–1997	Universitario		
1997–1998	Skoda Xanthi	2	(0)
1998	Deportivo Municipal	33	(7)
1999–2002	Universitario		
2003	FBC Melgar		
2003	Cienciano		
2004	Universitario		
2005	Sport Boys		
2006	Universitario		
2007	Total Clean		
2008–2009	Sport Águila		
2010–2011	Deportivo Coopsol		

International career
1996–2001	Peru	10	(2)

Managerial career
- 2017–2018: Sport Áncash
- 2019: Sport Chavelines
- 2019: Miguel Grau
- 2020: Universitario (W)
- 2021–2022: Universitario (W)
- * Club domestic league appearances and goals

Paolo Freddy Maldonado Farje (born 12 August 1973) is a Peruvian football manager and former player who manages Universitario (women).

== Biography ==
=== Early life ===
As a child, Maldonado aspired to become an engineer, before becoming a professional footballer.

=== Playing career ===
Maldonado was nicknamed "Manzanita". During his career, he won five league titles and the 2003 Copa Sudamericana. During his career, he was known as a locker room prankster.

=== Managerial career ===
After retiring from professional football, Maldonado became a manager.

== Style of play ==
Maldonado was known for utilizing his short height to take on opposing players.

== Personal life ==
Maldonado grew up supporting Peruvian side Universitario, a club he would later play for.
