= Juan La Rosa =

Peruvian footballer (born 1980)

Personal information
- Full name: Juan Carlos La Rosa Llontop
- Date of birth: 3 February 1980 (age 46)
- Place of birth: Túman, Peru
- Height: 1.81 m (5 ft 11 in)
- Position: Midfielder

Youth career
- Alianza Lima

Senior career*
Years	Team	Apps	(Gls)
1999–2001	Juan Aurich	36	(2)
2003–2005	Cienciano	80	(2)
2006	Alianza Lima	15	(2)
2007	Total Clean	21	(5)
2008	Sport Boys	12	(0)
2008	Alianza Lima	20	(3)
2009–2011	Juan Aurich	59	(1)
2011–2013	Universitario	19	(0)

International career
2004–2009	Peru	14	(0)
- * Club domestic league appearances and goals as of 14 July 2012

Juan Carlos La Rosa Llontop (born 3 February 1980) is a Peruvian former footballer who played as a midfielder.

== Career ==
He won the Copa Sudamericana with Cienciano and also the Recopa Sudamericana in 2003 and 2004 respectively.

La Rosa made 13 appearances for the Peru national football team.

== Honours ==
=== Club ===
Universitario de Deportes

- Torneo Descentralizado (1): 2013

Cienciano

- Copa Sudamericana: 2003
- Recopa Sudamericana: 2004
- Apertura: 2005

Alianza Lima

- Apertura: 2006
- Torneo Descentralizado (1): 2006
