= Alexander Araujo =

Peruvian footballer (born 1981)

Personal information
- Full name: Luis Alexander Araujo Ludueña
- Date of birth: 16 January 1981 (age 45)
- Place of birth: Piura, Peru
- Height: 1.81 m (5 ft 11 in)
- Position: Goalkeeper

Team information
- Current team: Deportivo Binacional
- Number: 1

Senior career*
Years	Team	Apps	(Gls)
2000–2005	Cienciano		
2006	José Gálvez		
2007–2008	Atlético Grau		
2009–2010	Sport Huancayo	17	(0)
2011	Inti Gas	10	(0)
2012–2015	Sporting Cristal	28	(0)
2016–2018	Unión Comercio	45	(0)
2018	Comerciantes Unidos	9	(0)
2019–	Deportivo Binacional	0	(0)
- * Club domestic league appearances and goals as of 5 March 2019

Luis Alexander Araujo Ludueña (born 16 January 1981) is a Peruvian footballer who plays for Deportivo Binacional, as a goalkeeper.

== Club career ==
Araujo began his senior career with Cienciano in 2000. He stayed with the Cusco side until the end of the 2005 season.

Then had a short spell with José Gálvez FBC in 2006. Then followed two seasons in the lower division playing for Atlético Grau.

He returned to the top-flight by joining Sport Huancayo, playing there for two seasons. Then in the 2010 season he played for Inti Gas Deportes making 10 appearances and conceding 9 goals.

In December 2011 he joined Sporting Cristal replacing Manuel Heredia as the second-choice goal keeper.
