= Alessandro Morán =

Peruvian association football player

Personal information
- Full name: Alessandro Morán Torres
- Date of birth: 30 November 1972 (age 53)
- Place of birth: Lima, Peru
- Position: Defender

Senior career*
Years	Team	Apps	(Gls)
1994	Lawn Tennis		
1995–1996	Universitario		
1997	José Gálvez		
1998	Lawn Tennis		
1999–2000	Deportivo Municipal		
2001	Melgar		
2002–2005	Cienciano		
2006	Melgar		
2007–2008	Sport Áncash		
2009	Deportivo Municipal		

International career
1995–2003	Peru	3	(0)
- * Club domestic league appearances and goals

Alessandro Morán Torres (born 30 November 1972) is a Peruvian football manager and former footballer who last managed Cienciano.

== Playing career ==
Morán helped Peruvian side Cienciano win the 2003 Copa Sudamericana. He was nicknamed "Edgar Davids" after Dutch internacional Edgar Davids. He has been regarded as a "bad luck player" due to suffering relegation four times.

== Style of play ==
Morán mainly operated as a defender or midfielder.

== Managerial career ==
After retiring from professional football, Morán worked as a manager.

== Honours ==
Cienciano

- Copa Sudamericana: 2003
- Recopa Sudamericana: 2004
- Torneo Apertura: 2005
