= Sérgio Júnior (footballer) =

Brazilian footballer

Personal information
- Full name: Sérgio Guimarães da Silva Júnior
- Date of birth: 19 February 1979 (age 47)
- Place of birth: Rio de Janeiro, Brazil
- Height: 1.82 m (6 ft 0 in)
- Position: Forward

Senior career*
Years	Team	Apps	(Gls)
1999	Cruzeiro		
2000–2001	Vitória S.C.	24	(4)
	Vizela	11	(3)
2002–2004	Sporting Cristal	50	(18)
2004	Ittihad Jeddah		
2005	Ponte Preta	22	(3)
2005	Bucheon FC 1995		
2006	Portuguesa	3	(0)
2007	Beijing Renhe		
2008	Rio Claro		
2008	Marília	1	(0)
2008	Sport Boys	17	(5)
2009	Cienciano	29	(8)
2010	Santa Helena		
2011	Fluminense	11	(1)
2012	Bangu		
2012–2013	América de Natal	1	(0)
2013	Bangu		
2013	Macaé		
2014	Nova Iguaçu		
2014	Icasa		
2014	Al Hilal Club		
2015	Madureira	2	(0)
- * Club domestic league appearances and goals

Sérgio Guimarães da Silva Júnior (born 19 February 1979), commonly known as Sérgio Júnior, is a Brazilian former professional footballer who played as a forward.

== Career ==
Sérgio Júnior has played club football for several Brazilian clubs throughout his career. He has also spent several seasons playing in the Peruvian first division, winning the 2003 Apertura championship with Sporting Cristal. He had also had spells playing in China, Portugal, South Korea, Saudi Arabia.
