= Johnny Vegas (footballer) =

Peruvian footballer (born 1976)

Personal information
- Full name: Johnny Martín Vegas Fernández
- Date of birth: 9 February 1976 (age 50)
- Place of birth: Huancayo, Peru
- Height: 1.78 m (5 ft 10 in)
- Position: Goalkeeper

Youth career
- Cantolao
- Sport Boys

Senior career*
Years	Team	Apps	(Gls)
1997–2003	Sport Boys	189	(20)
2004	Unión Huaral	20	(4)
2004	Universidad San Martín	26	(2)
2005	Melgar	15	(4)
2005–2007	Sporting Cristal	15	(0)
2008	Sport Ancash	43	(5)
2009	Cienciano	37	(2)
2010	Alianza Atlético	31	(2)
2011–2012	Unión Comercio	26	(0)
2013	Pacífico	26	(2)
2014	Defensor San Alejandro	27	(1)
2015	Los Caimanes	9	(0)
2015	Unión Comercio	10	(0)
2016	Los Caimanes	14	(3)
2017	La Bocana	3	(0)
Total		491	(45)

International career^{‡}
1999–2000	Peru	3	(0)

Managerial career
- 2017–2018: Unión Comercio Youth Team
- * Club domestic league appearances and goals as of 15:15, 19 April 2013 (UTC) ‡ National team caps and goals as of 15:47, 9 April 2009 (UTC)

Johnny Martín Vegas Fernández (born 9 February 1976) is a Peruvian former professional footballer. He is currently the 4th-highest-goalscoring goalkeeper of all time with 45 goals in all competitions – 30 from penalties and 9 from outfield goals.
