= Giuliano Portilla =

Peruvian footballer (born 1972)

Personal information
- Full name: Giuliano Santiago Portilla Castillo
- Date of birth: 25 May 1972 (age 54)
- Place of birth: Lima, Peru
- Height: 1.74 m (5 ft 9 in)
- Position: Defender

Youth career
- Sporting Cristal

Senior career*
Years	Team	Apps	(Gls)
1992−1994	León de Huánuco		
1995−2001	Universitario	173	(11)
2002	Melgar	34	(1)
2003−2006	Cienciano	108	(4)
2006	Sporting Cristal	19	(0)
2007	Deportivo Municipal	16	(2)
2007−2008	Melgar	62	(0)
2009	José Gálvez	38	(0)
2010−2011	León de Huánuco	30	(1)

International career
1997−2005	Peru	5	(0)
- * Club domestic league appearances and goals as of 10 November 2011

Giuliano Santiago Portilla Castillo (born 25 May 1972 in Lima) is a retired Peruvian footballer.

== Club career ==
Portilla previously played for a number of clubs in Peru, including Universitario de Deportes, Cienciano and FBC Melgar.

== International career ==
Portilla has made five appearances for the senior Peru national football team from 1997 to 2005.

== Honours ==
=== Club ===
Universitario de Deportes:

- Peruvian First Division: 1998, 1999, 2000

Cienciano del Cuzco:

- Copa Sudamericana: 2003
- Recopa Sudamericana: 2004
- Torneo Apertura: 2005
