= Freddy Ternero =

Peruvian footballer (1962–2015)

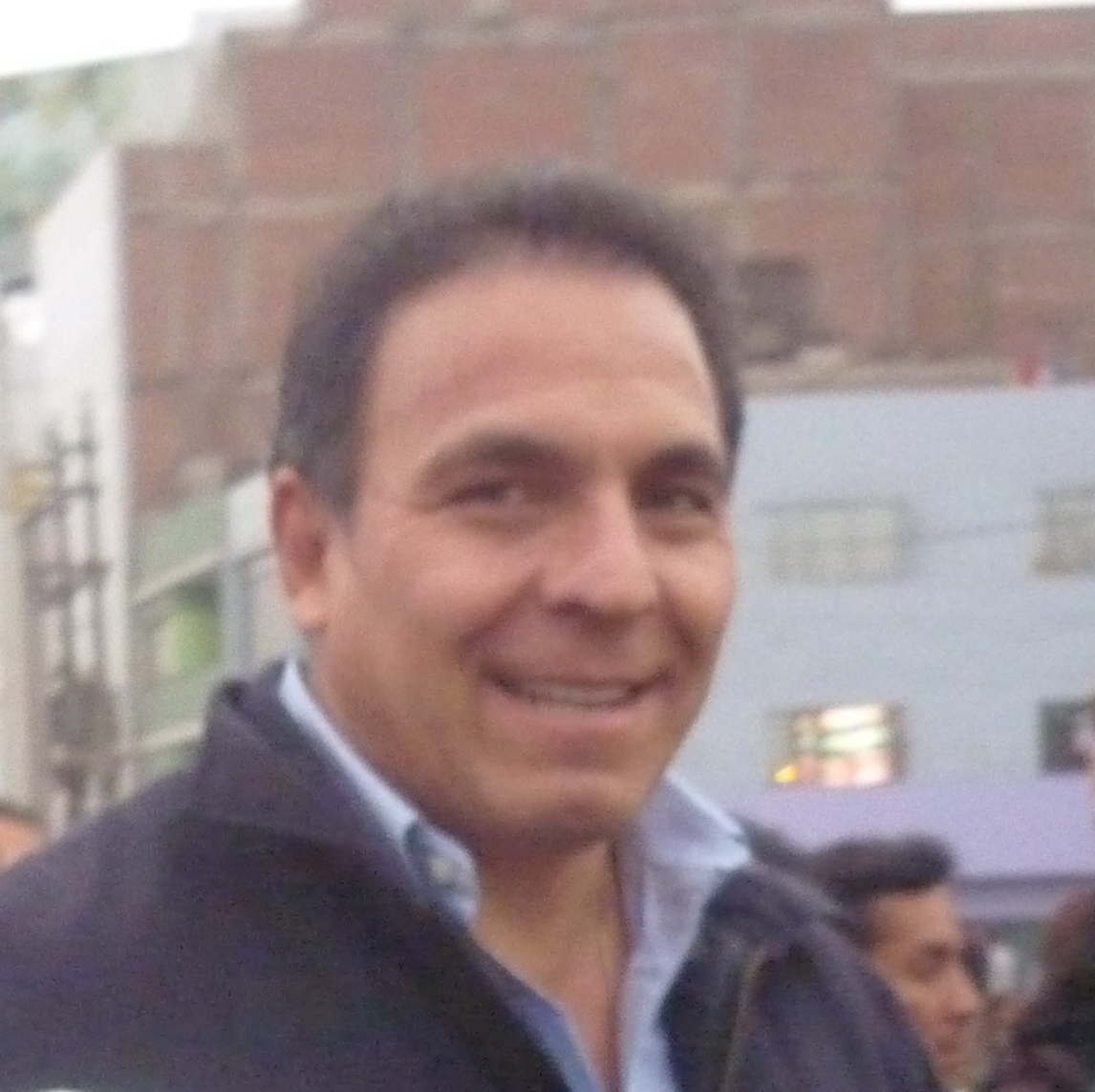

Personal information
- Full name: Freddy Santos Ternero Corrales
- Date of birth: March 26, 1959
- Place of birth: Lima, Peru
- Date of death: September 18, 2015 (aged 53)
- Place of death: Lima, Peru
- Position: Defender

Youth career
- Universitario

Senior career*
Years	Team	Apps	(Gls)
1978–1980	Universitario		
1981	León de Huánuco		
1982–1985	Universitario		
1986	San Agustín		
1987–1988	Universitario		
1989–1990	Defensor Lima		
1992	Cienciano		

Managerial career
- 1993: Universitario
- 1994–1995: Cienciano
- 1995: Alianza Atlético
- 1996–1998: Peru
- 1998: Melgar
- 2000–2001: Cienciano
- 2002: Estudiantes de Medicina
- 2003–2004: Cienciano
- 2005: Peru
- * Club domestic league appearances and goals

Freddy Santos Ternero Corrales (March 26, 1962 – September 18, 2015) was a Peruvian football player and manager. Ternero was the Mayor of District of San Martín de Porres in Lima, Peru for the periods of 2007–2010 and 2011–2014.

== Playing career ==
During his playing career Ternero played for several clubs in Peru, most notably Universitario de Deportes.

== Managerial career ==
Ternero started his coaching career as assistant to Sergio Markarián at Universitario de Deportes. When Markarián resigned, Ternero was given his first opportunity to work as a club manager.

In 1994, he took over at Cienciano, helping the club to avoid relegation. In 1995, he also had a spell with Alianza Atlético.

Ternero was given his first chance to manage the Peru national team between 1996 and 1998, where Peru missed the 1998 FIFA World Cup by goal differences to Chile, following the humiliating 4–0 away loss.

After spells with FBC Melgar, Cienciano and Estudiantes de Medicina Ternero returned for a third spell as Cienciano manager in 2003. He led the club to the Copa Sudamericana 2003 championship and followed that with the Recopa Sudamericana in 2004. The first international titles ever won by a Peruvian club.

These successes earned him a second opportunity to work as the Peru national coach. Under his guidance they were victors of the Kirin Cup in 2005 with UAE. Ternero left the post after Peru failed to qualify for the 2006 FIFA World Cup.

== Death ==
Ternero died in September 2015 from liver cancer.
