= Martín García (Peruvian footballer) =

Peruvian footballer (born 1970)

Personal information
- Date of birth: 4 June 1970 (age 56)
- Place of birth: Lima, Peru

International career
Years	Team	Apps	(Gls)
1995	Peru	1	(0)

Martín García (born 4 June 1970) is a Peruvian footballer. He played in one match for the Peru national football team in 1995. He was also part of Peru's squad for the 1995 Copa América tournament.
