= Julio García (Peruvian footballer) =

Peruvian footballer (born 1981)

Personal information
- Full name: Julio César García Mezones
- Date of birth: 16 June 1981 (age 45)
- Place of birth: Piura, Peru
- Height: 1.84 m (6 ft 0 in)
- Position: Midfielder

Senior career*
Years	Team	Apps	(Gls)
1999	Juan Aurich	6	(0)
2000	Alianza Lima	7	(0)
2001	Unión Minas	11	(1)
2002–2003	Cienciano	78	(10)
2004–2005	Monarcas	30	(2)
2005–2008	Cienciano	110	(13)
2008	AEL Limassol	9	(0)
2009	EN Paralimni	9	(0)
2009–2012	Cienciano	79	(11)
Total		339	(37)

International career
2003–2007	Peru	11	(0)
- * Club domestic league appearances and goals

Julio César García Mezones (born 16 June 1981) is a Peruvian former professional footballer who played as a midfielder.

== Club career ==
García was born in Piura. He started his senior career paying for Juan Aurich, and there he made his Torneo Descentralizado debut in the 1999 season. In his first season in the top-flight he played in 6 matches for the Ciclón.

The following season, he played for Alianza Lima. However, he only managed to make 7 appearances in the 2000 Descentralizado season.

In July 2009 García returned to Cienciano after his time abroad.
