= 2002 Torneo Descentralizado =

Torneo Descentralizado
- Season: 2002
- Dates: 22 February 2002 – 15 December 2002
- Champions: Sporting Cristal; 14th Primera División title
- Runner up: Universitario
- Relegated: Juan Aurich; Coopsol Trujillo
- Copa Libertadores: Sporting Cristal; Universitario; Alianza Lima
- Copa Sudamericana: Alianza Lima; Cienciano
- Top goalscorer: Luis Fabián Artime (24 goals)

The 2002 Torneo Descentralizado was the 86th season of the top category of Peruvian football (soccer). It was played by 12 teams. The national champion was Sporting Cristal.

== Competition modus ==
The national championship was divided into two and half-year tournaments, the Torneo Apertura and the Torneo Clausura. Each was played on a home-and-away round-robin basis. The winners of each would play for the national title in a playoff, but a team had to finish in the top 4 in both tournaments to earn the right to play the final. If the same club had won both tournaments, it would have won the national championship automatically.

Following-season Copa Libertadores berths went to each half-year tournament winner, and the best-placed team in the aggregate table. The two bottom teams on the aggregate table were relegated, but a playoff had to be played between the 10th- and 11th-placed teams since both obtained the same number of points (goal difference did not count as a tie-breaker).

== Teams ==
=== Team changes ===
Promoted from 2001 Copa Perú	Relegated from 2001 Primera División
▲ Coronel Bolognesi (1st)	▼ Unión Minas (12th)

=== Stadia locations ===
Locations of the 2002 Primera División teams

Team	City	Stadium	Capacity
Alianza Atlético	Sullana	Campeones del 36	8,000
Alianza Lima	Lima	Alejandro Villanueva	35,000
Cienciano	Cuzco	Garcilaso	42,056
Coronel Bolognesi	Tacna	Jorge Basadre	19,850
Deportivo Wanka	Huancayo	Huancayo	20,000
Estudiantes de Medicina	Ica	José Picasso Peratta	8,000
Juan Aurich	Chiclayo	Elías Aguirre	24,500
Melgar	Arequipa	Mariano Melgar	20,000
Sport Boys	Callao	Miguel Grau	15,000
Sport Coopsol Trujillo	Trujillo	Mansiche	24,000
Sporting Cristal	Lima	San Martín de Porres	18,000
Universitario	Lima	Monumental	80,093

== Torneo Apertura ==
=== Standings ===
Pos	Team	Pld	W	D	L	GF	GA	GD	Pts	Qualification
1	Universitario (O)	22	15	2	5	30	17	+13	47	Copa Libertadores 2003 First stage
2	Alianza Lima	22	14	5	3	43	23	+20	47	Qualification for 2002 Copa Sudamericana
3	Sporting Cristal	22	11	5	6	43	32	+11	38	
4	Cienciano	22	9	7	6	33	31	+2	34	
5	Alianza Atlético	22	10	3	9	37	26	+11	33	
6	Juan Aurich	22	7	7	8	29	25	+4	28	
7	Melgar	22	6	9	7	36	43	−7	27	
8	Sport Boys	22	7	4	11	29	37	−8	25	
9	Sport Coopsol Trujillo	22	6	6	10	28	32	−4	24	
10	Coronel Bolognesi	22	6	5	11	27	39	−12	23	
11	Estudiantes de Medicina	22	4	7	11	25	28	−3	19	
12	Deportivo Wanka	22	5	4	13	23	40	−17	19	

Updated to match(es) played on August 26, 2009. Source: https://www.rsssf.org/tablesp/peru02.html
Rules for classification: 1) points; 2) goal difference; 3) number of goals scored.
(O) Play-off winners

=== Results ===
Home \ Away	AAS	ALI	CIE	BOL	WAN	EST	MEL	JA	SBA	COO	CRI	UNI
Alianza Atlético		1–2	1–0	3–0	5–0	4–1	3–3	3–0	0–2	3–2	0–1	0–0
Alianza Lima	0–1		5–1	2–0	3–2	2–1	2–1	1–1	3–1	0–1	5–1	1–0
Cienciano	1–0	2–1		2–1	2–1	3–3	1–1	0–0	3–0	3–2	1–0	2–0
Coronel Bolognesi	3–2	0–0	3–2		3–3	1–1	1–1	3–2	3–2	1–2	1–3	0–0
Deportivo Wanka	1–0	0–0	2–3	0–1		2–0	2–1	3–1	3–0	0–0	1–1	1–2
Estudiantes de Medicina	1–2	1–1	0–0	2–3	1–0		4–0	1–1	2–2	2–0	0–0	0–1
Melgar	1–1	2–3	3–3	3–2	1–0	3–1		0–0	1–0	4–1	4–4	1–0
Juan Aurich	3–1	2–2	2–0	1–0	4–0	1–2	3–0		3–1	1–1	2–1	1–2
Sport Boys	0–2	2–3	3–2	1–0	2–0	3–0	4–4	1–0		1–3	1–0	0–1
Sport Coopsol Trujillo	0–2	1–2	0–0	2–1	6–0	3–0	0–0	1–1	1–1		0–3	0–3
Sporting Cristal	4–3	2–4	2–2	4–0	2–1	3–1	4–0	1–0	1–1	2–1		0–1
Universitario	1–0	0–1	1–0	1–0	2–1	3–1	4–2	1–0	2–1	2–1	3–4	

Updated to match(es) played on 30 January 2012. Source: RSSSF Peru 2002
Legend: Blue = home team win; Yellow = draw; Red = away team win.

=== Apertura playoff ===
26 June 2002
15:30
First leg

Universitario	1–0	Alianza Lima
Martín Vilallonga 57'

Estadio Monumental, Lima
Referee: Martín Cabrera
7 July 2002
15:30
Second leg

Alianza Lima	0–0	Universitario

Estadio Mansiche, Trujillo
Referee: Gilberto Hidalgo
Universitario Apertura 2002 winners
To Copa Libertadores 2003

== Torneo Clausura ==
=== Standings ===
Pos	Team	Pld	W	D	L	GF	GA	GD	Pts	Qualification
1	Sporting Cristal	22	13	7	2	46	18	+28	46	Copa Libertadores 2003 First stage
2	Alianza Lima	22	13	6	3	40	18	+22	42 (Note: Alianza Lima and Alianza Atlético were docked 3 points for evading anti-doping tests in Torneo Apertura's Round 22.)	
3	Alianza Atlético	22	11	6	5	40	18	+22	36	
4	Cienciano	22	11	3	8	50	44	+6	36	
5	Estudiantes de Medicina	22	9	5	8	36	29	+7	32	
6	Sport Boys	22	7	8	7	28	24	+4	29	
7	Deportivo Wanka	22	7	8	7	30	35	−5	29	
8	Coronel Bolognesi	22	8	4	10	24	29	−5	28	
9	Melgar	22	6	7	9	25	33	−8	25	
10	Juan Aurich	22	5	5	12	20	35	−15	20	
11	Universitario	22	4	7	11	27	36	−9	19	
12	Sport Coopsol Trujillo	22	3	4	15	18	51	−33	13	

Updated to match(es) played on August 26, 2009. Source: https://www.rsssf.org/tablesp/peru02.html
Rules for classification: 1) points; 2) goal difference; 3) number of goals scored.

=== Results ===
Home \ Away	AAS	ALI	CIE	BOL	WAN	EST	MEL	JA	SBA	COO	CRI	UNI
Alianza Atlético		2–2	4–0	1–0	4–0	1–0	3–2	1–1	0–0	2–0	0–3	2–1
Alianza Lima	2–2		4–2	3–0	0–0	1–0	3–1	3–0	1–1	3–1	0–0	3–2
Cienciano	4–1	2–1		2–1	4–1	3–0	4–1	3–1	3–1	1–1	2–3	5–2
Coronel Bolognesi	3–2	0–0	1–2		1–0	1–0	1–0	2–1	0–2	0–1	2–3	2–1
Deportivo Wanka	1–1	3–1	3–3	1–0		4–2	1–1	1–1	4–1	3–2	0–0	1–3
Estudiantes de Medicina	2–0	0–2	4–2	1–1	1–1		3–0	4–1	1–1	9–1	1–1	1–0
Melgar	0–1	0–2	2–1	1–1	2–0	2–0		0–0	2–2	2–0	2–2	1–0
Juan Aurich	0–1	0–2	2–1	1–0	0–2	0–1	3–1		0–0	3–1	5–2	1–2
Sport Boys	1–2	1–0	2–1	0–1	2–2	0–1	2–2	4–0		2–1	0–0	4–0
Sport Coopsol Trujillo	2–4	0–3	2–2	0–4	0–1	2–3	1–1	1–0	1–0		0–3	1–1
Sporting Cristal	2–0	0–2	5–0	5–1	2–0	4–1	2–0	3–0	2–0	2–0		1–1
Universitario	0–0	1–2	2–3	2–2	4–1	1–1	1–2	0–0	0–2	2–0	1–1	

Updated to match(es) played on 2002. Source: RSSSF Peru 2002
Legend: Blue = home team win; Yellow = draw; Red = away team win.

== Final playoff ==
No final playoff was played since the Apertura winner Universitario did not finish in the Clausura's top 4, while Sporting Cristal won the Clausura after placing third in the Apertura.

== Aggregate table ==
Pos	Team	Pld	W	D	L	GF	GA	GD	Pts	Qualification or relegation
1	Alianza Lima	44	27	11	6	83	41	+42	89 (Note: Alianza Lima and Alianza Atlético were docked 3 points for evading anti-doping tests in Torneo Apertura's Round 22.)	2003 Copa Libertadores First stage
2	Sporting Cristal (C)	44	24	12	8	89	50	+39	84	2003 Copa Libertadores First stage
3	Cienciano	44	20	10	14	83	75	+8	70	2003 Copa Sudamericana Preliminary Phase
4	Alianza Atlético	44	21	9	14	71	52	+19	69	
5	Universitario	44	19	9	16	57	53	+4	66	2003 Copa Libertadores First stage
6	Sport Boys	44	14	12	18	57	61	−4	54	
7	Melgar	44	12	16	16	61	67	−6	52	
8	Estudiantes de Medicina	44	13	12	19	61	67	−6	51	
9	Coronel Bolognesi	44	14	9	21	51	68	−17	51	
10	Juan Aurich (R)	44	12	12	20	49	60	−11	48	Relegation play-off
11	Deportivo Wanka (O)	44	12	12	20	53	75	−22	48	Relegation play-off
12	Sport Coopsol Trujillo (R)	44	9	10	25	46	83	−37	37	Relegation to 2003 Copa Perú

Updated to match(es) played on August 26, 2009. Source: https://www.rsssf.org/tablesp/peru02.html
Rules for classification: 1) points; 2) goal difference; 3) number of goals scored.
(C) Champions; (O) Play-off winners; (R) Relegated

== Relegation play-off ==
11 December 2002
15:00

Juan Aurich	2–1	Deportivo Wanka
Adrián Torres 55'; Rodolfo Miñán 70'		Edward Torrealva 63'

Estadio Elías Aguirre, Chiclayo
Referee: Martín Cabrera
15 December 2002
15:30

Deportivo Wanka	4–0	Juan Aurich
Marco Ruiz 3'; Edilberto Salazar 40'; Juan Montenegro 52'; Héctor Valoyes 92'

Estadio Huancayo, Huancayo
Referee: Víctor Hugo Rivera
Juan Aurich relegated to Copa Perú

== Top scorers ==
Rank	Scorer	Club	Goals
1	(Argentina) Luis Artime	Melgar	24
2	(Argentina) Sergio Ibarra	Alianza Atlético	22
3	(Peru) Germán Carty	Cienciano	18
3	(Peru) Antonio Serrano	Sport Boys	18
5	(Uruguay) Ernesto Zapata	Cienciano	15

== Torneo Sub-20 ==
Alongside the Torneo Descentralizado, an Under-20 Tournament was held, featuring U-20 players from top-flight clubs. Unlike the reserve team competitions played between 1931 and 1934, this tournament did not award any bonus points to the senior teams’ league standings.

The tournament was played from February through December 8 and followed a two-round format (Apertura and Clausura).

=== Torneo Clausura ===
Pos	Team	Pld	W	D	L	GF	GA	GD	Pts	Qualification or relegation
1	Alianza Lima	22	17	3	2	76	15	+61	54	Champion
2	Sport Coopsol Trujillo	22	15	2	5	54	28	+26	47	
3	Sporting Cristal	22	15	1	6	50	21	+29	46	
4	Cienciano	22	6	5	11	32	48	−16	23	
5	Alianza Atlético	22	4	3	15	38	69	−31	15	
6	Universitario	22	12	5	5	46	24	+22	41	
7	Sport Boys	22	9	4	9	39	39	0	31	
8	Melgar	22	6	4	12	39	59	−20	22	
9	Estudiantes de Medicina	22	4	5	13	28	57	−29	17	
10	Coronel Bolognesi	22	13	4	5	40	34	+6	43	
11	Juan Aurich	22	7	2	13	35	56	−21	23	
12	Deportivo Wanka	22	3	4	15	17	44	−27	13	

Updated to match(es) played on 2002. Source: https://web.archive.org/web/20021217020054/http://www.peru.com/futbol/sub20/archivo/2002/tablaposiciones.asp
Rules for classification: 1) points; 2) goal difference; 3) number of goals scored.

== See also ==
- 2002 Peruvian Segunda División
- 2002 Copa Perú
