= Santiago Acasiete =

Peruvian footballer (born 1977)

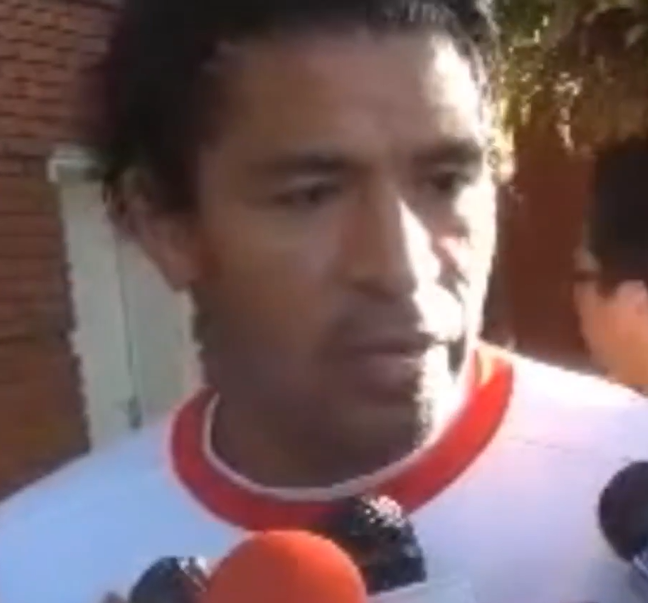
- Acasiete in 2011

Personal information
- Full name: Wilmer Santiago Acasiete Ariadela
- Date of birth: 22 November 1977 (age 49)
- Place of birth: Callao, Peru
- Height: 1.82 m (6 ft 0 in)
- Position: Centre back

Team information
- Current team: FC Cajamarca (head coach)

Youth career
- 1989–1994: Universitario

Senior career*
Years	Team	Apps	(Gls)
1995–2001	Deportivo Wanka	42	(3)
2002	Universitario	36	(2)
2003–2004	Cienciano	51	(7)
2004–2012	Almería	200	(13)
2012–2014	Cienciano	67	(5)
Total		396	(30)

International career
2004–2013	Peru	42	(2)

Managerial career
- 2023: Deportivo Municipal (assistant)
- 2023: Deportivo Municipal
- 2024–2025: Juan Pablo II College
- 2026–: FC Cajamarca
Medal record
Representing Peru
Association football
Copa America
Bronze medal – third place	Argentina 2011
- * Club domestic league appearances and goals

Wilmer Santiago Acasiete Ariadela (born 22 November 1977) is a Peruvian football manager and former player who played as a central defender.

He also holds a Spanish passport due to the many years he spent in the country, mainly with Almería, with whom he appeared in four La Liga seasons.

Acasiete represented Peru in three Copa América tournaments.

== Club career ==
Born in Callao, Acasiete started playing professionally with Deportivo Wanka, moving in the following year to Universitario de Deportes. After another sole season he joined Cienciano del Cuzco, helping the former country's capital side to the 2003 South American Cup and the 2004 South American Supercup.

For 2004–05, Acasiete signed with UD Almería in the Spanish second division. He was an important defensive element in the Andalusians first-ever promotion to La Liga in 2007, being used intermittently in the subsequent seasons however: in his first top level campaign in Spain he appeared in only 20 games, but still managed to award his team six points with last-minute home strikes against Sevilla FC and Villarreal CF (both 1–0).

Following the end of 2011–12, spent again in the second level, 34-year-old Acasiete opted out of his contract with Almería and returned to his former club Cienciano.

== International career ==
Acasiete gained more than 40 caps for the Peru national team, the first on 18 February 2004 at almost 27, and participated at the 2004 and 2007 Copa América.

On 7 December 2007, he was found guilty of having introduced women and alcohol into the national squad's hotel two days before Peru's away drubbing at the hands of Ecuador (5–1), and was thus suspended 18 months (1.5 years) from international competition (national sides only). On 3 July of the following year, after an investigation and a review of the facts, the suspension was changed to three months (from the date of appeal in April) with a US$10,000 fine.

== Honours ==
Cienciano

- Copa Sudamericana: 2003
- Recopa Sudamericana: 2004

Peru

- Copa América third place: 2011
