= Germán Carty =

Peruvian footballer (born 1968)

Personal information
- Full name: Luis Germán del Carmen Carty Monserrate
- Date of birth: 16 July 1968 (age 58)
- Place of birth: Cañete, Peru
- Height: 1.80 m (5 ft 11 in)
- Position: Striker

Team information
- Current team: Octavio Espinosa (manager)

Youth career
- 1992: Sport Boys

Senior career*
Years	Team	Apps	(Gls)
1992–1994	Sport Boys	34	(18)
1995	Universitario	45	(17)
1996	Sport Boys		(17)
1996–1997	Atlante	13	(4)
1997–1998	Irapuato		
1998	Sporting Cristal		(3)
2000	Melgar	13	(1)
2001	Blooming	3	(0)
2001	Estudiantes	17	(11)
2002–2004	Cienciano	124	(34)
2005	Alianza Lima	22	(3)
2005	Sport Boys	22	(3)
2006	Chalatenango		
2006	Unión Huaral	6	(0)
2007	Total Clean	35	(5)
2008	Sport Áncash	43	(13)
2009	Total Chalaco	26	(6)
2010	Sport Boys	11	(0)
2011	Deportivo Coopsol	23	(7)
2012–2013	Pacifico	48	(3)
2014–2015	Atlético Minero	42	(4)
Total		477	(146)

International career
1993–2004	Peru	25	(3)

Managerial career
- 2017: Deportivo Garcilaso
- 2018: Walter Ormeño
- 2018–: Atlético Huracán
- 2019: Barranco City F.C
- 2019–: Octavio Espinosa
- * Club domestic league appearances and goals

Luis Germán del Carmen Carty Monserrate (born 16 July 1968) is a Peruvian former professional footballer who played as a striker.

== Club career ==
Carty most prominently played for Cienciano. He was the top goalscorer as Cienciano won the 2003 Copa Sudamericana. During his career, he played for, among others, Coronel Bolognesi, Hijos de Yurimaguas, Sport Boys, Universitario, Sporting Cristal and Alianza Lima in Peru, Mexican clubs Atlante F.C. and CD Irapuato, Salvadoran club C.D. Chalatenango, as well as Club Blooming in Bolivia.

== International career ==
During his career Carty made 25 appearances for the Peru national football team.

== Career statistics ==
#	Date	Venue	Opponent	Score	Result	Competition
1.	17 January 1997	San Diego, United States	United States	1–0	Win	1997 U.S. Cup
2.	6 July 1997	Lima, Peru	Bolivia	2–1	Win	1998 FIFA World Cup qualification (CONMEBOL)
3.	10 September 1997	Lima, Peru	Uruguay	2–1	Win	1998 FIFA World Cup qualification (CONMEBOL)

== Honours ==
Individual

- Copa Sudamericana top scorer in 2003 – 6 goals
