= Rodrigo Saraz =

Colombian footballer (born 1978)

Rodrigo Saraz (born August 26, 1978) is a Colombian footballer currently playing for Deportivo Coopsol of the Segunda Division in Peru. He plays as a striker.

== Teams ==
- (Colombia) Atlético Nacional 1998–1999
- (Peru) Deportivo UPAO 2000
- (Peru) Sport Coopsol Trujillo 2001–2002
- (Peru) Cienciano 2003–2004
- (Peru) Universidad César Vallejo 2005
- (Peru) Coronel Bolognesi 2005
- (Colombia) Cúcuta Deportivo 2006
- (Peru) Sport Boys 2007
- (Peru) Cienciano 2007
- (Colombia) Boyacá Chicó 2008
- (Colombia) Deportes Quindio 2008
- (Colombia) Envigado 2009
- (Colombia) Itagüí Ditaires 2010
- (Peru) Deportivo Coopsol 2010–present

== Titles ==
- (Peru) Cienciano 2003 (Copa Sudamericana), 2004 (Recopa Sudamericana)
- (Colombia) Cúcuta Deportivo 2006 (Torneo Finalización)
- (Colombia) Boyacá Chicó 2008 (Torneo Apertura)
