= Carlos Lugo (Paraguayan footballer) =

Paraguayan footballer (born 1976)

Carlos Maria Lugo Aquino (born 30 May 1976) is a Paraguayan football defender. He played for Sport Boys in Peru. Lugo started in the youth divisions of Olimpia Asunción he then had a spell with All Boys in Argentina before playing in the professional squad of Club Cerro Corá. Lugo then moved to Cienciano of Peru where he was part of the team that won the Copa Sudamericana and Recopa Sudamericana. He is best remembered for his winning goal in the 2003 Copa Sudamericana final against River Plate.

Lugo also played for Club Nacional of Paraguay in 2007 and moved to Sport Boys of Peru in 2008.

Lugo also played for the Paraguay national football team in 2004.
