= Estudiantes de Medicina =

- Full name: Club Social y Deportivo; Estudiantes de Medicina
- Nickname: "Los Morados"
- Founded: 15 September 1975
- Ground: Estadio José Picasso Peratta, Ica
- Capacity: 8,000
- Chairman: César Augusto Martínez
- League: Copa Perú
- 2008: -
Home colours	Away colours

Club Social y Deportivo Estudiantes de Medicina is a Peruvian football club from the city of Ica.

The club was founded 1975 and plays in the Copa Perú, which is the third division of the Peruvian league.

== History ==
The club was founded on 15 September 1975. It was the 2000 Copa Perú champion, when it defeated Coronel Bolognesi in the finals.

The club has played at the highest level of Peruvian football on three occasions, in the 2001, 2002, and 2003 Torneo Descentralizado.

In the 2004 Torneo Descentralizado, the club merged with the Atlético Grau, forming the club Grau-Estudiantes, but was relegated the same year.

== Honours ==
=== National ===
- Torneo Clausura
  - Runner-up (1): 2001
- Copa Perú
  - Winners (1): 2000

=== Regional ===
- Región IV
  - Winners (2): 1999, 2000
  - Runner-up (1): 1998
- Liga Departamental de Ica
  - Winners (6): 1995, 1996, 1997, 1998, 1999, 2000

== See also ==
- List of football clubs in Peru
- Peruvian football league system
