= Estadio Monumental Virgen de Chapi =

Multi-purpose stadium in Arequipa, Peru

Coordinates: 16.40729°S 71.520203°W

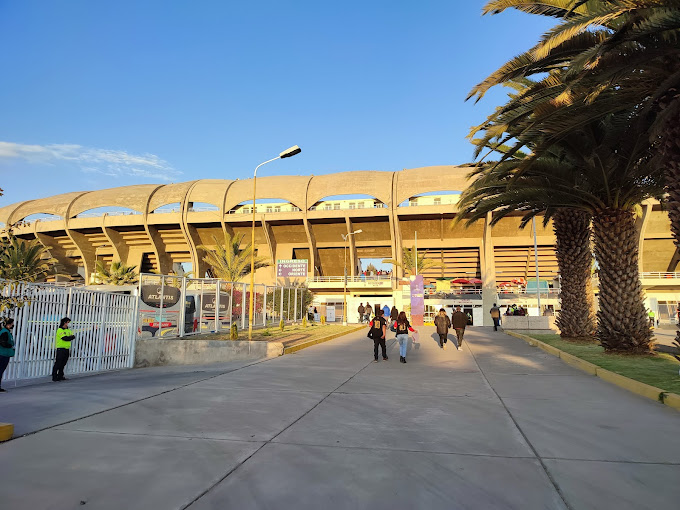
- Interactive map of Estadio Monumental Virgen de Chapi
- Former names: Estadio de la UNSA
- Location: Arequipa, Peru
- Elevation: 2,370 m (7,780 ft)
- Owner: Universidad Nacional San Augustín
- Operator: FBC Melgar
- Capacity: 40,370
- Surface: Grass
- Field size: 105 m × 70 m

Construction
- Groundbreaking: 1990
- Built: 1991–1993
- Opened: 1993
- Cost: US$ 7 million

Tenants
- FBC Melgar (1993–present); IDUNSA (1993–present)

Estadio Monumental Virgen de Chapi is a multi-purpose stadium located in Arequipa, Peru. The stadium was built by the University of San Agustín in the early 1990s and named after the Virgin of Chapi. Due to its size, the term Monumental is added to its name. The stadium was largely financed by a lottery fund-raiser held by the university itself. It is the home stadium of football clubs Melgar of the Peruvian Primera División and IDUNSA of the Copa Perú. The stadium has hosted large events such as the Bolivarian Games and the Copa América in addition to a Copa Sudamericana final in 2003 involving Cienciano and River Plate. The stadium currently has capacity of 40,370.

== History ==
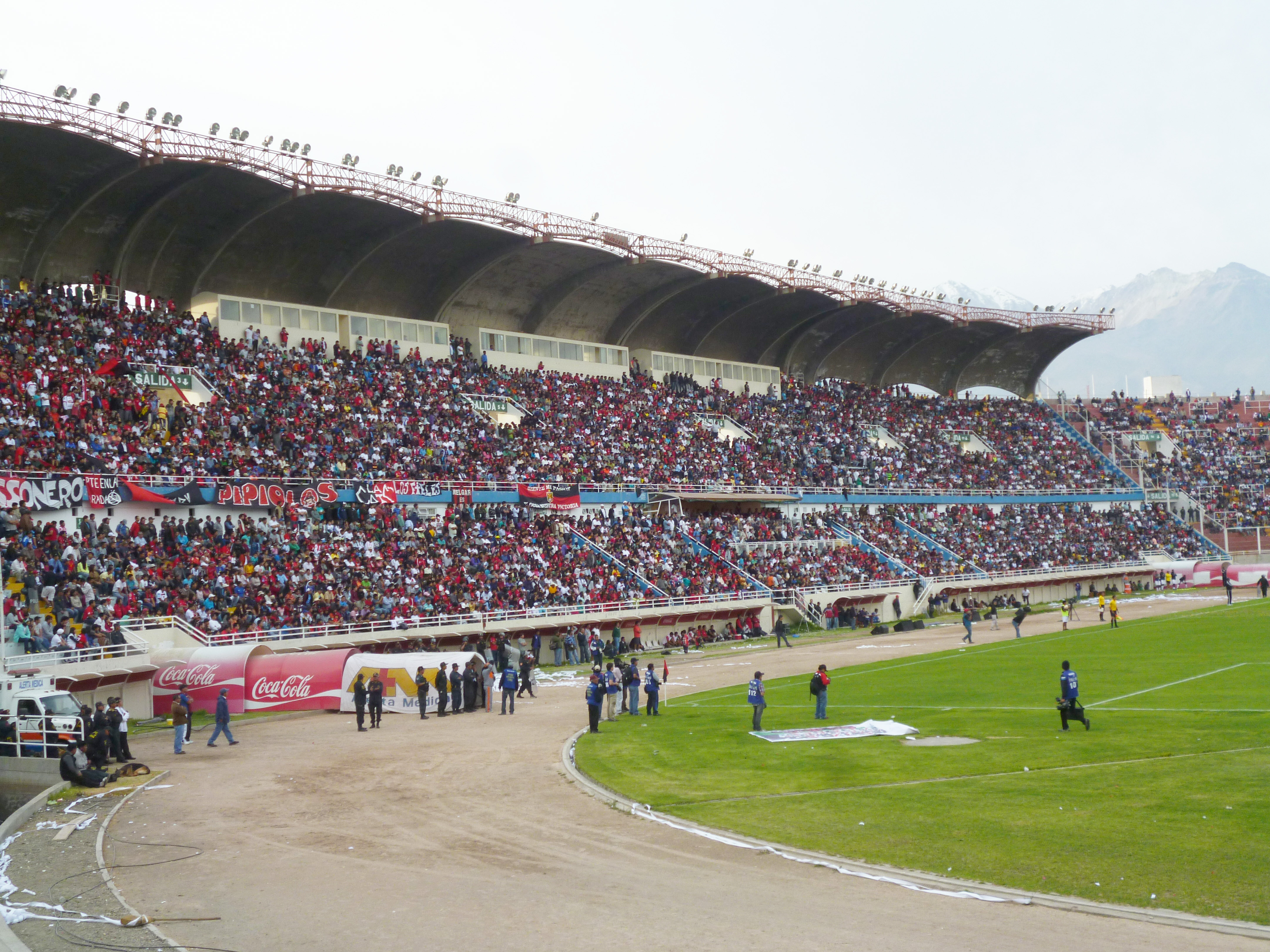
The west side of the stadium

On February 2, 1985, Pope John Paul II visited the city of Arequipa in which the coronation of the Virgin of Chapi took place on a field. The field would eventually become the site of the monumental stadium the University of San Agustín would build. Early efforts to gather funds were largely organized by the university, which organized several fund-raisers by giving volunteering students lottery tickets to sell throughout the city. The prizes consisted of apartments near the new stadium. The rector of university Juan Manuel Guillén said that 70% of the stadium was financed through this lottery fund-raiser. Former president Alberto Fujimori promised to donate $2.5 million for the construction of the stadium; however the project only received S./ 2.5 million from the former president which he received severe criticism for.

The stadium was first opened on November 11, 1993. The first game to be played was an inter-schools championship final between Ingeniería Geofísica and Mecánica Eléctrica; Ingeniería Geofísica won 1–0. On July 30, 1995, the first professional football match was played in which local FBC Melgar faced Alianza Lima; the match ended in a 1–1 draw. In 1997, the stadium hosted the XIII Bolivarian Games.

The second leg of the 2003 Copa Sudamericana Finals between local Cienciano of Cusco and Argentinian River Plate was hosted at the Virgen de Chapi as Cienciano's home ground did not meet the CONMEBOL stadium requirements. The turnout for the match was unprecedented and Cienciano defeated River Plate 1–0 (after a 3–3 draw in Buenos Aires) to lift Peru's first international club trophy. In addition to the Sudamericana final, Cienciano continued to play in Arequipa for international matches until their own Estadio Garcilaso de la Vega was renovated.

The stadium was selected to be a venue for the 2004 Copa América. Arequipa hosted the first four group matches of Group C involving the national football teams of Costa Rica, Brazil, Paraguay, and Chile.

The stadium was going to be one of the five venues for the 2019 FIFA U-17 World Cup.

== 2004 Copa America ==
Date	Time	Team #1	Score	Team #2	Round
July 8, 2004	17:30	Costa Rica	0-1	Paraguay	Group C
July 8, 2004	19:45	Brazil	1-0	Chile	Group C
July 8, 2004	15:00	Brazil	4-1	Costa Rica	Group C
July 8, 2004	17:15	Paraguay	1-1	Chile	Group C
July 14, 2004	19:45	Brazil	1-2	Paraguay	Group C

== See also ==
- Peru national football team
- List of Peruvian Stadiums
- Lists of stadiums
