= 2003 Copa Sudamericana =

2003 Copa Nissan Sudamericana de Clubes 2003 Copa Nissan Sul-americana do Clubes

Tournament details
- Dates: July 29 - December 19
- Teams: 35 (from 10 associations)

Final positions
- Champions: (Peru) Cienciano (1st title)
- Runners-up: (Argentina) River Plate

Tournament statistics
- Matches played: 64
- Goals scored: 164 (2.56 per match)
- Top scorer: (Peru) Germán Carty (6)

The 2003 Copa Nissan Sudamericana was the second edition of CONMEBOL's new international club tournament. It was won by Peruvian club Cienciano, who won the first international trophy for their club and the country. They also qualified to play in the 2004 Recopa Sudamericana.

== First stage ==
=== Argentina Preliminary ===
Team 1	Agg.	Team 2	1st leg	2nd leg
Argentina III Preliminary
Colón (Argentina)	7–2	(Argentina) Vélez Sársfield	3–1	4–1
Argentina IV Preliminary
Independiente (Argentina)	2–1	(Argentina) Rosario Central	1–1	1–0

=== Brazil Preliminary ===
Qualifies to the Final Brazilian Preliminary

==== Brazil 1 Preliminary ====
Pos	Team	Pld	W	D	L	GF	GA	GD	Pts
1	(Brazil) Santos	2	1	1	0	4	1	+3	4
2	(Brazil) Internacional	2	1	1	0	4	2	+2	4
3	(Brazil) Flamengo	2	0	0	2	1	6	−5	0

Team 1	Score	Team 2
Santos (Brazil)	1–1	(Brazil) Internacional
Internacional (Brazil)	3–1	(Brazil) Flamengo
Flamengo (Brazil)	0–3	(Brazil) Santos

==== Brazil 2 Preliminary ====
Pos	Team	Pld	W	D	L	GF	GA	GD	Pts
1	(Brazil) Fluminense	2	2	0	0	4	0	+4	6
2	(Brazil) Atlético Mineiro	2	1	0	1	2	2	0	3
3	(Brazil) Corinthians	2	0	0	2	0	4	−4	0

Team 1	Score	Team 2
Corinthians (Brazil)	0–2	(Brazil) Atlético Mineiro
Fluminense (Brazil)	2–0	(Brazil) Corinthians
Atlético Mineiro (Brazil)	0–2	(Brazil) Fluminense

==== Brazil 3 Preliminary ====
Pos	Team	Pld	W	D	L	GF	GA	GD	Pts
1	(Brazil) São Paulo	2	2	0	0	6	1	+5	6
2	(Brazil) Vasco da Gama	2	0	1	1	2	3	−1	1
3	(Brazil) Grêmio	2	0	1	1	1	5	−4	1

Team 1	Score	Team 2
Grêmio (Brazil)	0–4	(Brazil) São Paulo
Vasco da Gama (Brazil)	1–1	(Brazil) Grêmio
São Paulo (Brazil)	2–1	(Brazil) Vasco da Gama

==== Brazil 4 Preliminary ====
Pos	Team	Pld	W	D	L	GF	GA	GD	Pts
1	(Brazil) São Caetano	2	1	1	0	4	1	+3	4
2	(Brazil) Cruzeiro	2	1	1	0	2	1	+1	4
3	(Brazil) Palmeiras	2	0	0	2	0	4	−4	0

Team 1	Score	Team 2
São Caetano (Brazil)	3–0	(Brazil) Palmeiras
Palmeiras (Brazil)	0–1	(Brazil) Cruzeiro
Cruzeiro (Brazil)	1–1	(Brazil) São Caetano

=== Venezuela/Bolivia/2002 Champion Preliminary ===
==== First round ====
Team 1	Agg.	Team 2	1st leg	2nd leg
Venezuela Preliminary
Monagas (Venezuela)	1–3	(Venezuela) Deportivo Italchacao	1–2	0–1

==== Second round ====
Team 1	Agg.	Team 2	1st leg	2nd leg
Venezuela/San Lorenzo Preliminary
Deportivo Italchacao (Venezuela)	1–8	(Argentina) San Lorenzo	1–2	0–6
Bolivia Preliminary
The Strongest (Bolivia)	3–3 (4–2p)	(Bolivia) Bolívar	2–2	1–1

=== Peru/Chile Preliminary ===
Team 1	Agg.	Team 2	1st leg	2nd leg
Chile Preliminary
Universidad Católica (Chile)	2–2 (5–3p)	(Chile) Provincial Osorno	0–1	2–1
Peru Preliminary
Cienciano (Peru)	2–0	(Peru) Alianza Lima	1–0	1–0

=== Colombia/Ecuador Preliminary ===
Team 1	Agg.	Team 2	1st leg	2nd leg
Colombia Preliminary
Atlético Nacional (Colombia)	2–1	(Colombia) Deportivo Pasto	0–0	2–1
Ecuador Preliminary
LDU Quito (Ecuador)	3–2	(Ecuador) Barcelona	2–0	1–2

=== Paraguay/Uruguay Preliminary ===
Team 1	Agg.	Team 2	1st leg	2nd leg
Paraguay Preliminary
Guaraní (Paraguay)	1–1 (2–4p)	(Paraguay) Libertad	0–1	1–0
Uruguay Preliminary
Danubio (Uruguay)	2–3	(Uruguay) Nacional	0–1	2–2

== Second stage ==
=== Argentina Zone ===
Team 1	Agg.	Team 2	1st leg	2nd leg
Quarterfinalist 4
Colón (Argentina)	2–3	(Argentina) Boca Juniors	1–1	1–2
Quarterfinalist 8
Independiente (Argentina)	1–8	(Argentina) River Plate	1–4	0–4

=== Brazil Zone ===
Team 1	Agg.	Team 2	1st leg	2nd leg
Quarterfinalist 2
São Caetano (Brazil)	1–2	(Brazil) Santos	0–1	1–1
Quarterfinalist 5
São Paulo (Brazil)	2–1	(Brazil) Fluminense	1–0	1–1

=== Venezuela/Bolivia/2002 Champion Zone ===
Team 1	Agg.	Team 2	1st leg	2nd leg
Quarterfinalist 6
The Strongest (Bolivia)	3–2	(Argentina) San Lorenzo	2–0	1–2

=== Peru/Chile Zone ===
Team 1	Agg.	Team 2	1st leg	2nd leg
Quarterfinalist 1
Cienciano (Peru)	5–3	(Chile) Universidad Católica	4–0	1–3

=== Colombia/Ecuador Zone ===
Team 1	Agg.	Team 2	1st leg	2nd leg
Quarterfinalist 3
LDU Quito (Ecuador)	1–2	(Colombia) Atlético Nacional	1–1	0–1

=== Paraguay/Uruguay Zone ===
Team 1	Agg.	Team 2	1st leg	2nd leg
Quarterfinalist 7
Nacional (Uruguay)	3–3 (2–3p)	(Paraguay) Libertad	3–0	0–3

== Bracket ==
Quarterfinals
(Peru) Cienciano	1	2	3
(Brazil) Santos	1	1	2
(Colombia) Atlético Nacional	1	4	5
(Argentina) Boca Juniors	0	1	1
(Brazil) São Paulo	4	3	7
(Bolivia) The Strongest	1	1	2
(Paraguay) Libertad	0	1	1
(Argentina) River Plate	2	0	2

Semifinals
(Peru) Cienciano	2	1	3
(Colombia) Atlético Nacional	1	0	1
(Brazil) São Paulo	1	2	3 (2)
(Argentina) River Plate	3	0	3 (4)

Finals
(Peru) Cienciano	3	1	4
(Argentina) River Plate	3	0	3

== Quarterfinals ==
Team 1	Agg.	Team 2	1st leg	2nd leg
River Plate (Argentina)	2–1	(Paraguay) Libertad	2–0	0–1
Boca Juniors (Argentina)	1–5	(Colombia) Atlético Nacional	0–1	1–4
Santos (Brazil)	2–3	(Peru) Cienciano	1–1	1–2
The Strongest (Bolivia)	2–7	(Brazil) São Paulo	1–4	1–3

== Semifinals ==
Team 1	Agg.	Team 2	1st leg	2nd leg
River Plate (Argentina)	3–3 (4–2 p)	(Brazil) São Paulo	3–1	0–2
Atlético Nacional (Colombia)	1–3	(Peru) Cienciano	1–2	0–1

== Finals ==
2003-12-10
21.10 (UTC-3)

River Plate (Argentina)	3–3	(Peru) Cienciano
Maxi López 28', 50'; Salas 85'	Report	Portilla 26', 79'; Carty 67'

Estadio Antonio Vespucio Liberti (Monumental), Buenos Aires
Referee: Carlos Eugênio Simon (Brazil)

2003-12-19
19.10 (UTC-3)

Cienciano (Peru)	1–0	(Argentina) River Plate
Lugo 78'	Report

Estadio Universidad de San Agustín, Arequipa
Referee: Gustavo Méndez (Uruguay)
