= Cienciano =

Association football club in Peru

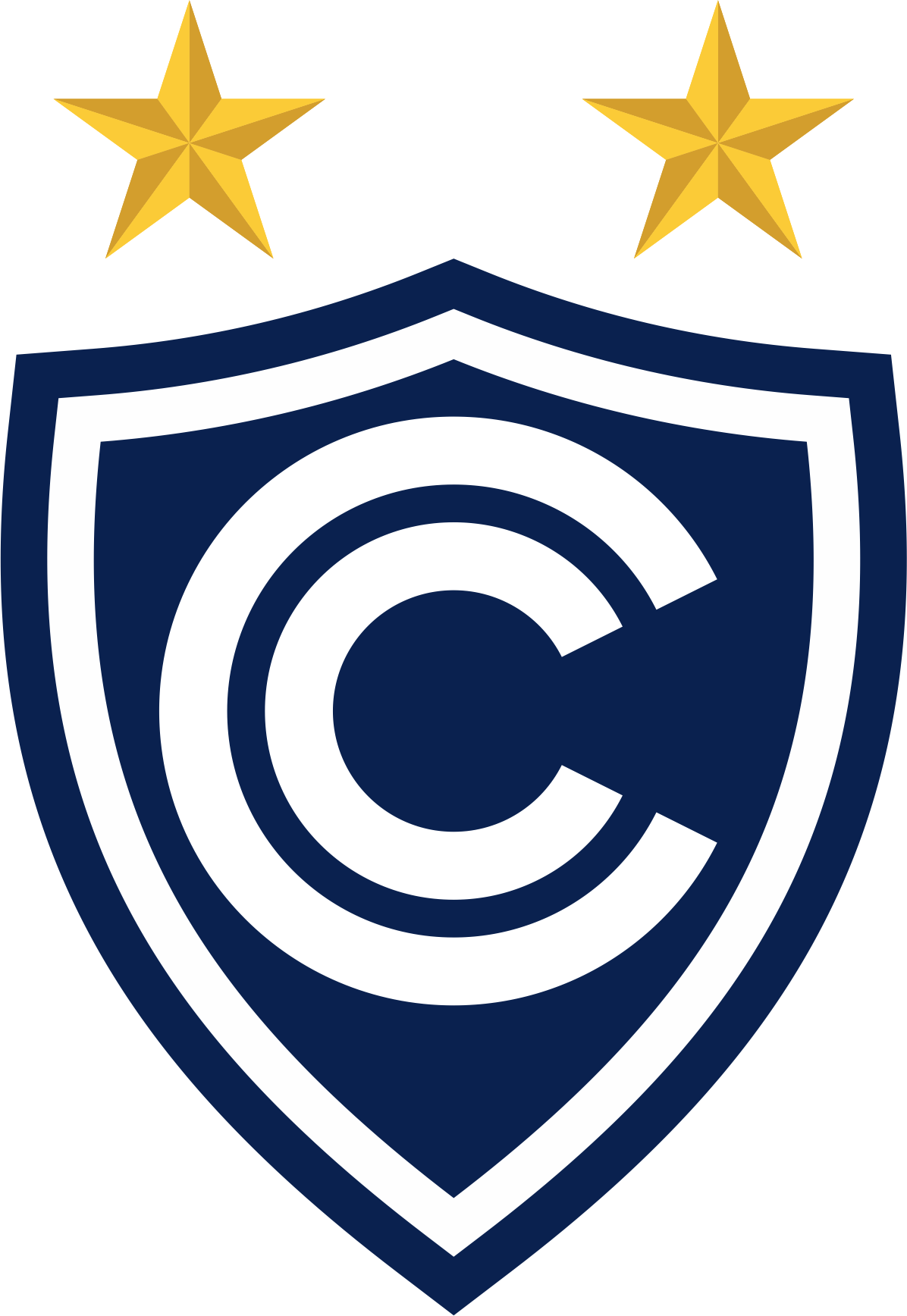
- Full name: Club Cienciano
- Nicknames: El Papá de América (The Father of America); La Furia Roja (The Red Fury); Escuadrón Rojo (Red Squadron); Conjunto Incaico (Incan Team); Elenco Colegial (Collegiate Cast); Los Imperiales (The Imperials); Rojos (Reds)
- Founded: 8 July 1901; 125 years ago
- Ground: Estadio Garcilaso
- Capacity: 45,056
- Chairman: Sergio Ludeña
- Manager: Horacio Melgarejo
- League: Liga 1
- 2025: Liga 1, 8th of 19
- Website: www.cienciano.com
Home colours	Away colours	Third colours

Club Cienciano, more commonly known as Cienciano, is a Peruvian professional football club based in Cusco, that currently plays in the Peruvian Primera División. It gained worldwide recognition after defeating River Plate in the finals of the 2003 Copa Sudamericana and Boca Juniors in the 2004 Recopa Sudamericana. The club is considered the largest and most successful in Cusco. Founded in 1901, the club is among the oldest in Peru, and the oldest in Cusco.

The club was founded on 8 July, 1901 by a group of students of the Colegio Nacional Ciencias del Cusco, the oldest school in Peru. They decided to give the club its name based on the word Ciencias, which means "Science". The club is nicknamed El Papá de América, the "Father of America", after its two continental titles. It has a large, longstanding rivalry with FBC Melgar of Arequipa known as El Clasico del Sur. Its mascot is a donkey. The club plays their home games at Estadio Inca Garcilaso de la Vega, named after Peruvian writer, Inca Garcilaso de la Vega. The club shares the stadium with other clubs from Cusco, Cusco FC and Deportivo Garcilaso. The stadium has a capacity of 45,056 making it the fourth largest stadium in Peru.

To this day, Cienciano is the only Peruvian club to win an international competition. Despite being the only club from Peru to win two international tournaments, they have yet to win the Peruvian Primera División. Cienciano has won 1 Copa Sudamericana and Recopa Sudamericana, 1 Segunda División and the Torneo Apertura 2005 and Torneo Clausura in 2001 and 2006.

== History ==
=== Beginnings ===
Cienciano was founded on 8 July 1901 by a group of students from the National School of Science of Cusco (Colegio Nacional Ciencias del Cusco). It participated in several leagues and tournaments of the region. They played their first official match on 27 July 1902 against Atletic Club in Cusco. Cienciano soon won its first trophy, winning the 1903 Liga Departamental del Cusco, and would go on to win it 27 times from 1912 to 1983.

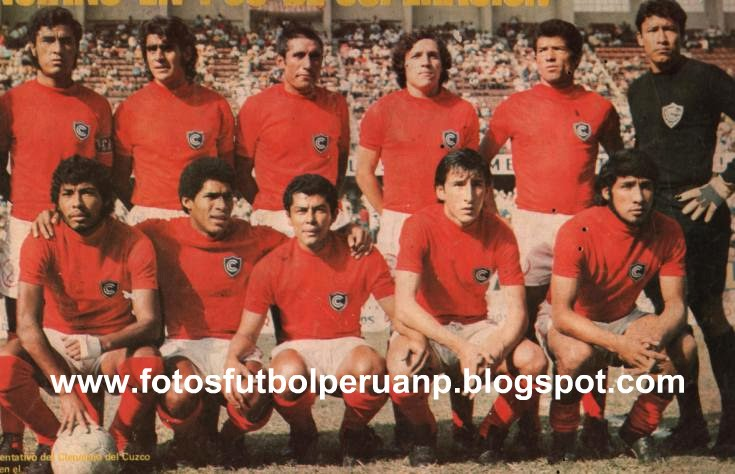
Cienciano's squad in 1973

In 1966 Hector Ladrón de Guevara was the inaugural Cienciano player to be named captain of the Peru national team. In 1972, it began to play in the Peruvian First Division; however, the club was relegated four years later.

The Cienciano team was managed by the teachers of the Cienciano Alma Mater School until the mid-sixties, when after the creation of the Copa Perú, football in Peru became more competitive. And in 1973, when Cienciano left the Cusco League and the Copa Peru behind to participate for the first time in the Peruvian First Division, it was understood that the authorities should no longer depend on the College for the attention that a competitive soccer team requires, which is why Waldo Callo, another of Cienciano's precursors, is stepping away from the presidency to make way for businessmen willing to invest and support the team.

Cienciano remained in the First Division until 1977, where they were relegated to the Peruvian Second Division. In 1988, the FPF invited the club to play in a tournament of the southern region. In 1991, Cienciano won the tournament and in 1992 it once again played in the First Division. Since then, the club has always played in the First Division.

=== The Golden age (2000–2007) ===
==== First League title ====
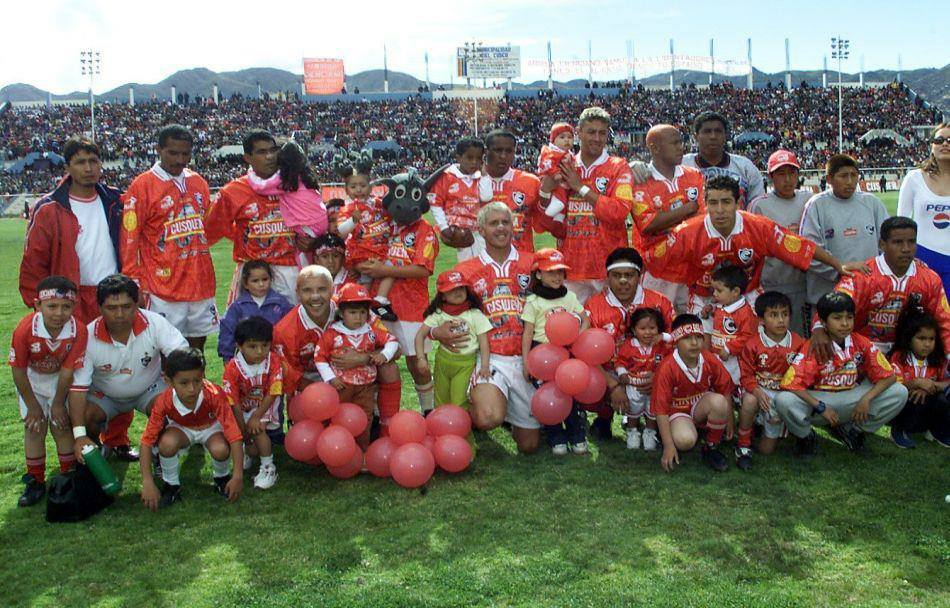
Cienciano's 2001 squad

In 2001, Cienciano celebrated its 100 year anniversary by winning its first title with the 2001 Torneo Clausura of the Peruvian Primera División, although it lost the superfinal (played between the winners of the Apertura and Clausura tournaments) to Alianza Lima. Cienciano qualified for the 2002 Copa Libertadores for the first time and reached the Round of 16 but was eliminated by Club América of Mexico.

==== Copa Sudamericana win ====
In 2003, Cienciano, led by Peruvian coach Freddy Ternero, qualified to the Copa Sudamericana for the first time in its history, after beating Sporting Cristal in an internal qualifying tournament. The team went through every later knockout round as the clear underdog defeating Peru's Alianza Lima in the Peru preliminary, Chile's Universidad Católica in the Chile-Peru Zone to enter the quarter-finals, Colombia's Atlético Nacional (once Copa Libertadores champion) in semi-finals and Brazil's Santos (twice Copa Libertadores champion) and in the quarter-final, to get to the finals. Once at the finals the team faced one of the biggest teams in South American football, River Plate of Argentina (twice Copa Libertadores champion). After a 3–3 draw in Buenos Aires, Cienciano went on to win 1–0 in Peru with a free-kick goal by Paraguayan defender Carlos Lugo, which put the aggregate score at 4–3 in its favor to win the final. The game was played at Estadio Monumental de la UNSA in Arequipa (home of Cienciano's rivals Melgar, some of whose fans actually attended the match to root for River Plate) because of the insufficient capacity for a CONMEBOL final of the Estadio Garcilaso (which has been expanded since then in 2013). As a result to winning the Copa Sudamericana, Cienciano qualified for the Copa Libertadores but lost to C.D. Guadalajara of Mexico in the qualifying round, 8–2 on aggregate.

This was the first international championship for a Peruvian team in history; only two other Peruvian teams had advanced to the finals of an international tournament, which was in the Copa Libertadores (Universitario in 1972 and Sporting Cristal in 1997). Both teams were defeated in the finals. The win was considered a severe upset because Cienciano had never been the Peru national champion (the team did win one half-year tournament in 2001 but lost the national championship title through a penalty shootout to the winner of the second tournament, Alianza Lima, in the year in which both celebrated their centenary. The situation was repeated in 2006, but reversed: Cienciano won the second tournament but lost the final to Alianza Lima on aggregate.

==== Recopa Sudamericana win ====
After winning the Copa Sudamericana, Cienciano went on to play against Boca Juniors of Argentina, another South American giant, for the 2004 Recopa Sudamericana, this being just one match, much like the UEFA Super Cup, which was disputed between the winners of both South American Cups of the previous season: the Copa Sudamericana and the Copa Libertadores. After a 1–1 draw, Cienciano went on to win the title 4–2 on penalties. The match was played at Lockhart Stadium in Fort Lauderdale, Florida.

Soon after the club's win in the Recopa Sudamericana, the Guatemala national football team organized a friendly against the club. Cienciano won the friendly three goals to zero. As a result of winning the Recopa Sudamericana, Cienciano participated in the 2005 Copa Libertadores but were eliminated in the preliminary round to C.D. Guadalajara of Mexico.

==== More league titles and superfinal runner-ups ====
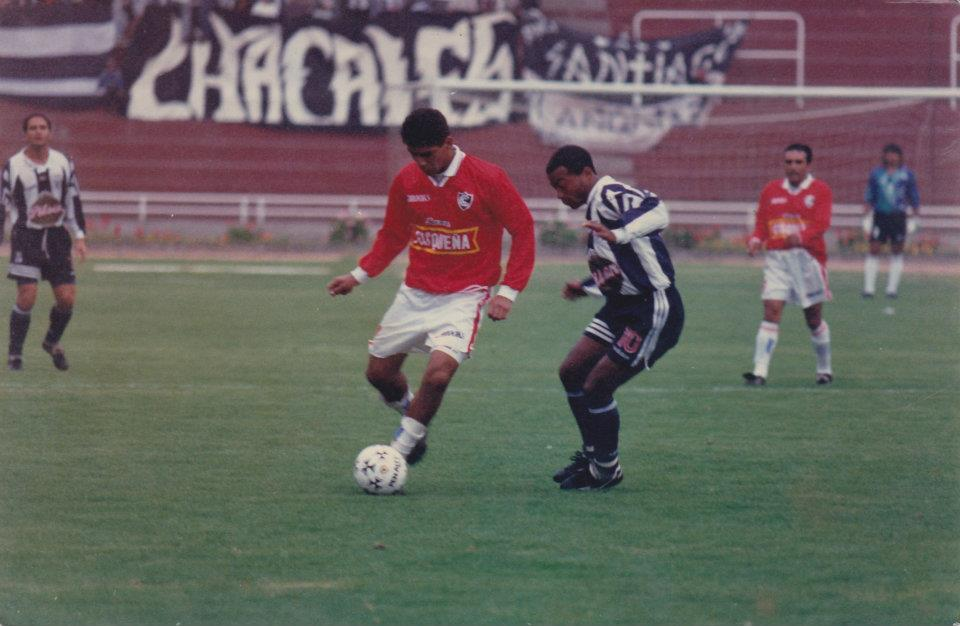
Cienciano vs Alianza Lima in 2001

In 2005, the Cusco-based club won the Torneo Apertura, but lost the superfinal to Sporting Cristal. The following year, it won the 2006 Clausura, but lost the superfinal again to Alianza Lima, the same team that had beaten them in the 2001 national championship final. After winning the 2006 Torneo Apertura, Cienciano qualified for the Copa Libertadores once again, but were eliminated in the group stage after placing last with four points. In 2007, Cienciano qualified for the 2007 and 2008 Copa Libertadores after winning the 2006 Torneo Clausura and being the third placed team, and finished third in its group both editions. A year later, they qualified again for the Copa Sudamericana but were eliminated in the Round of 16. Since then, Cienciano has not qualified for the Copa Libertadores.

=== Relegation and comeback ===
In 2015, the club was relegated after finishing in the bottom three of the aggregate table. The club finished third and was one point off from the title play-off in the 2016 season. In 2018, the club won third place in the league and participated in the promotion play off group, where the top two teams get promoted to the 2019 Liga 1. Cienciano placed third with four points. In 2019, it was finally promoted back to the first division after winning the 2019 Liga 2, winning their first national competition.

After the 2021, 2022 Liga 1 seasons, Cienciano qualified for the 2022 and 2023 Copa Sudamericana after placing in the top 8 of the league. The club was eliminated in the first stage in both editions. In 2025, the club qualified for the 2025 Copa Sudamericana group stage.

== Kit and crest ==
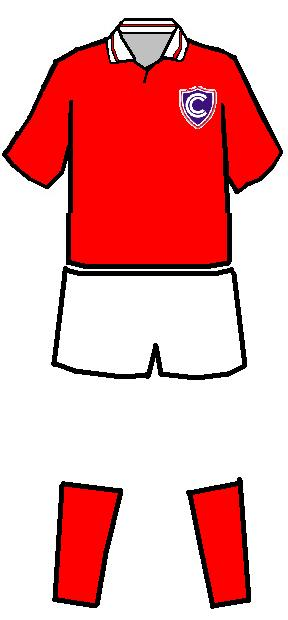
Traditional kit of Cienciano

Cienciano's traditional kit is a red shirt with white shorts and either white or red socks. Its away colours are usually navy blue with white shorts. Since 2020, the club added a third kit which is a white or yellow shirt and either white or black shorts and socks.

The club's badge was designed by the publicist, Santiago Guillén Covarrubias in 1938. It consists of a navy badge outlined in white, with a white double C representing the club's name. Its two stars represent the club's two international titles, being the Copa Sudamericana and Recopa Sudamericana.

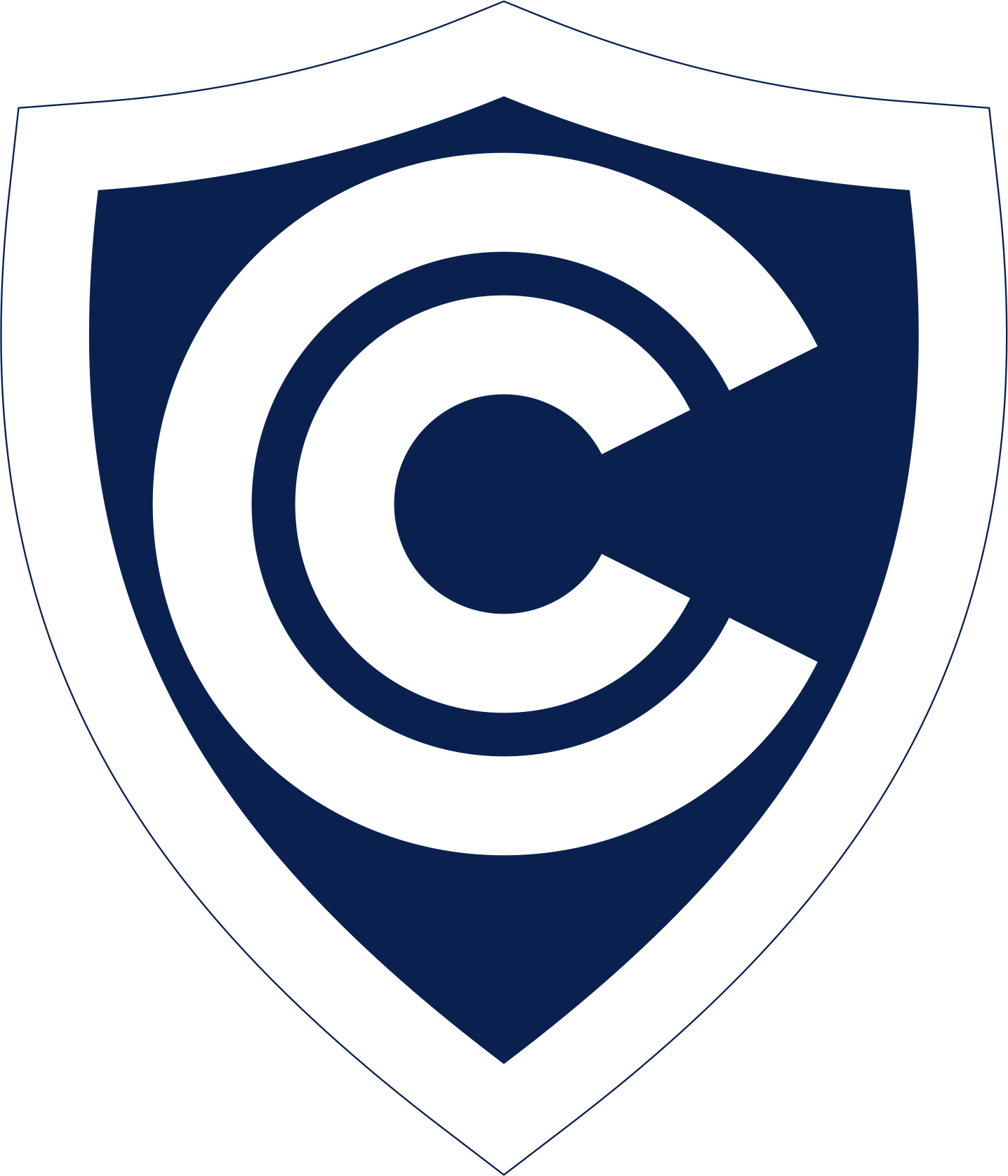
1901–2003

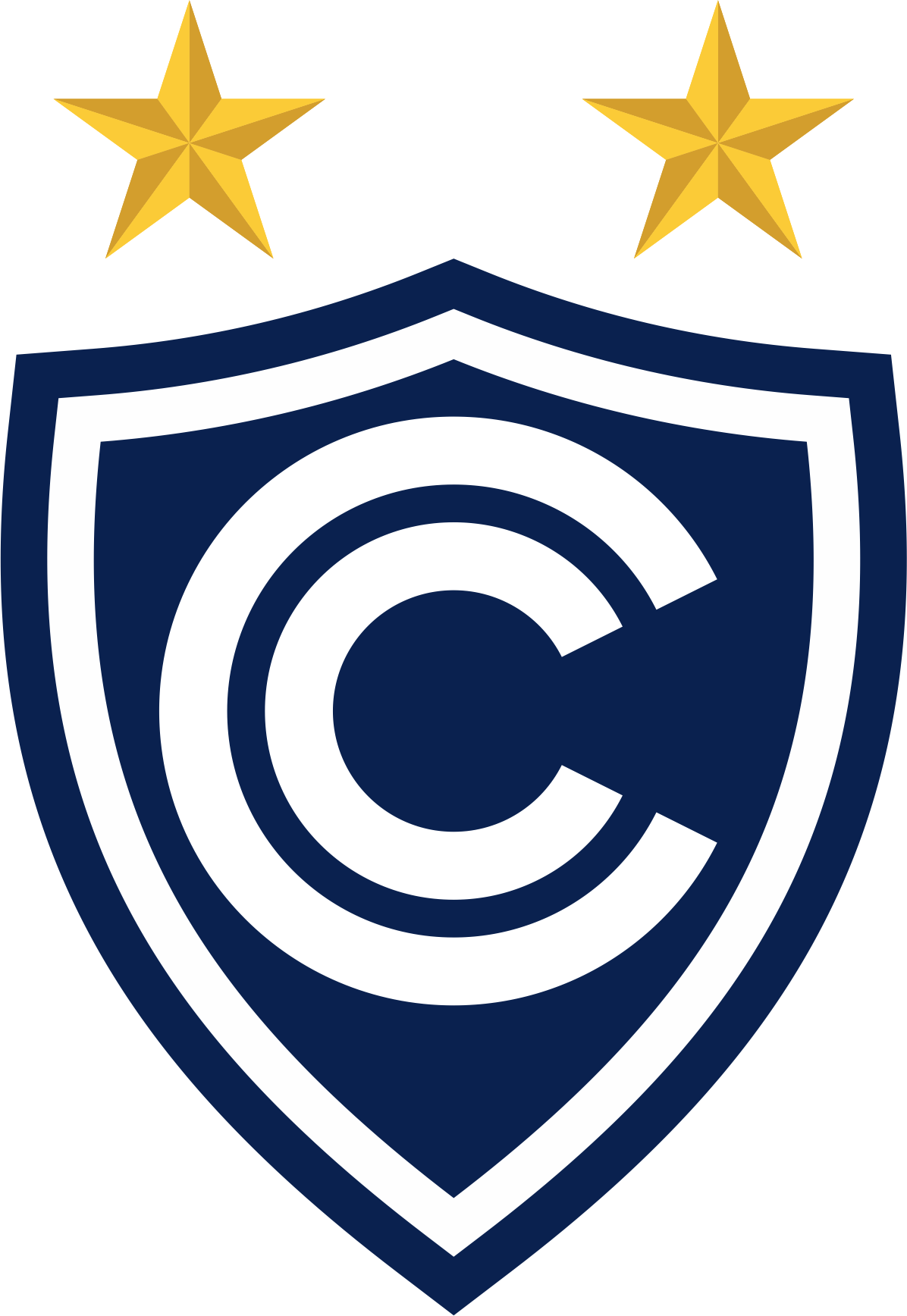
2004–Present

== Stadium ==
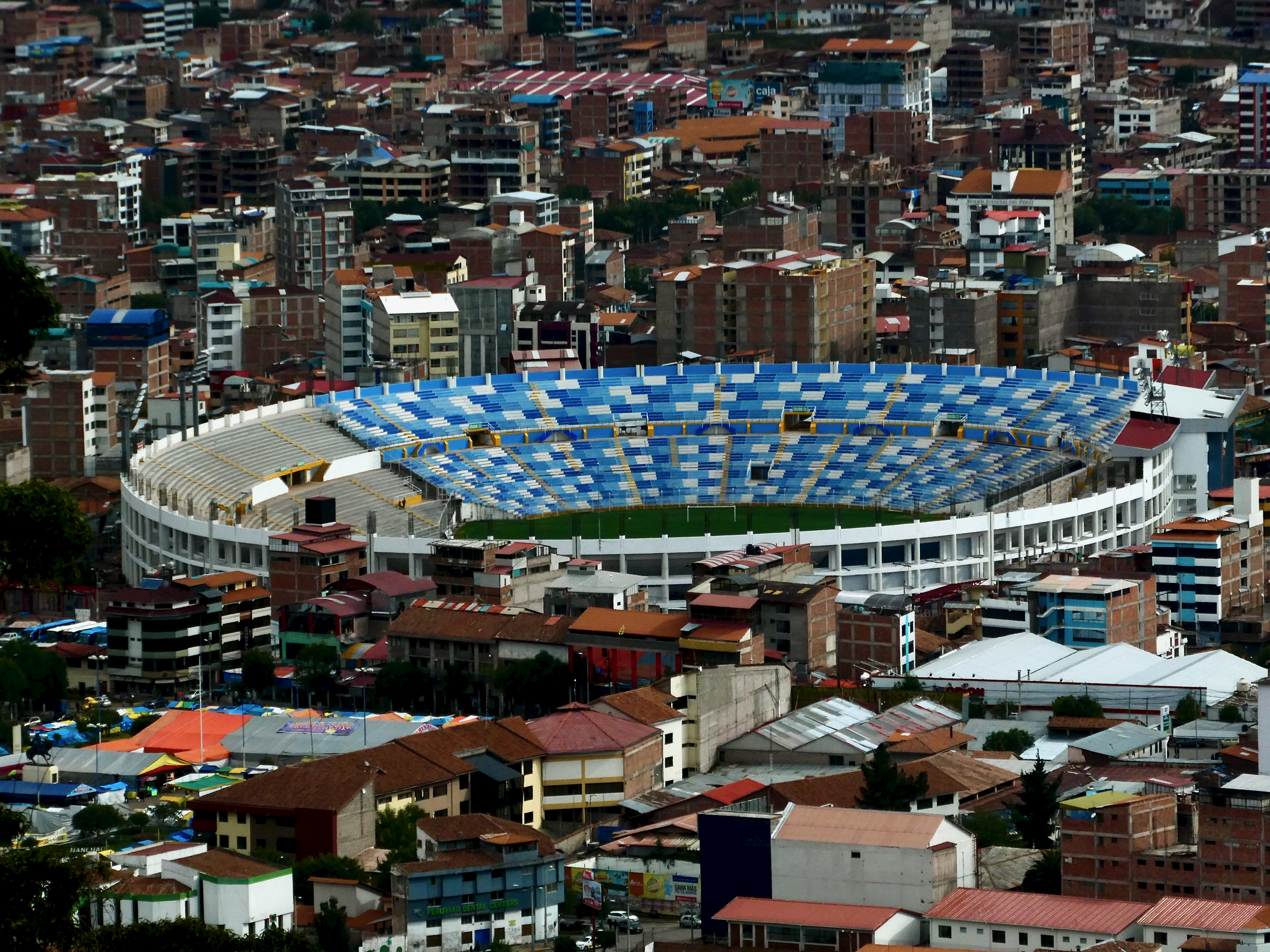
Estadio Garcilaso

Cienciano plays its home games in Estadio Garcilaso de la Vega which is in Centre of Cusco. It was named after the Peruvian writer, Inca Garcilaso de la Vega. When first inaugurated in 1950, it had a spectator capacity of 22,000 and had a running track. In 2004, the stadium's capacity was expanded to 42,000, losing its running track. Because of Cienciano's success in international tournaments, it would be a venue in the 2004 Copa América. The stadium hosted only one match of the tournament, being the third place play-off between Uruguay and Colombia. The stadium is known as the most beautiful in South America, with its seating in a rainbow and representing the colors of Cusco.

In 2004, the stadium's capacity was expanded to 42,000, losing its running track. Because of Cienciano's success in international tournaments, it would be a venue in the 2004 Copa America, which was hosted by Peru. In 2013, there was another renovation which expanded the stadium to 45,000 and added new luxury boxes, seating and a new exterior. The initial renovation was meant to add a roof and modern wall around the stadium as well, but was not implemented due to a low budget.

Cienciano shares the stadium with city rivals Cusco FC and Deportivo Garcilaso. The Estadio Garcilaso is the largest stadium in Cusco and the fourth largest in Peru. The club also has a museum within the stadium, coordinated by the Regional Government of Cusco in 2018. The museum includes photos of the team, trophies, and relics of the club.

== Supporters ==
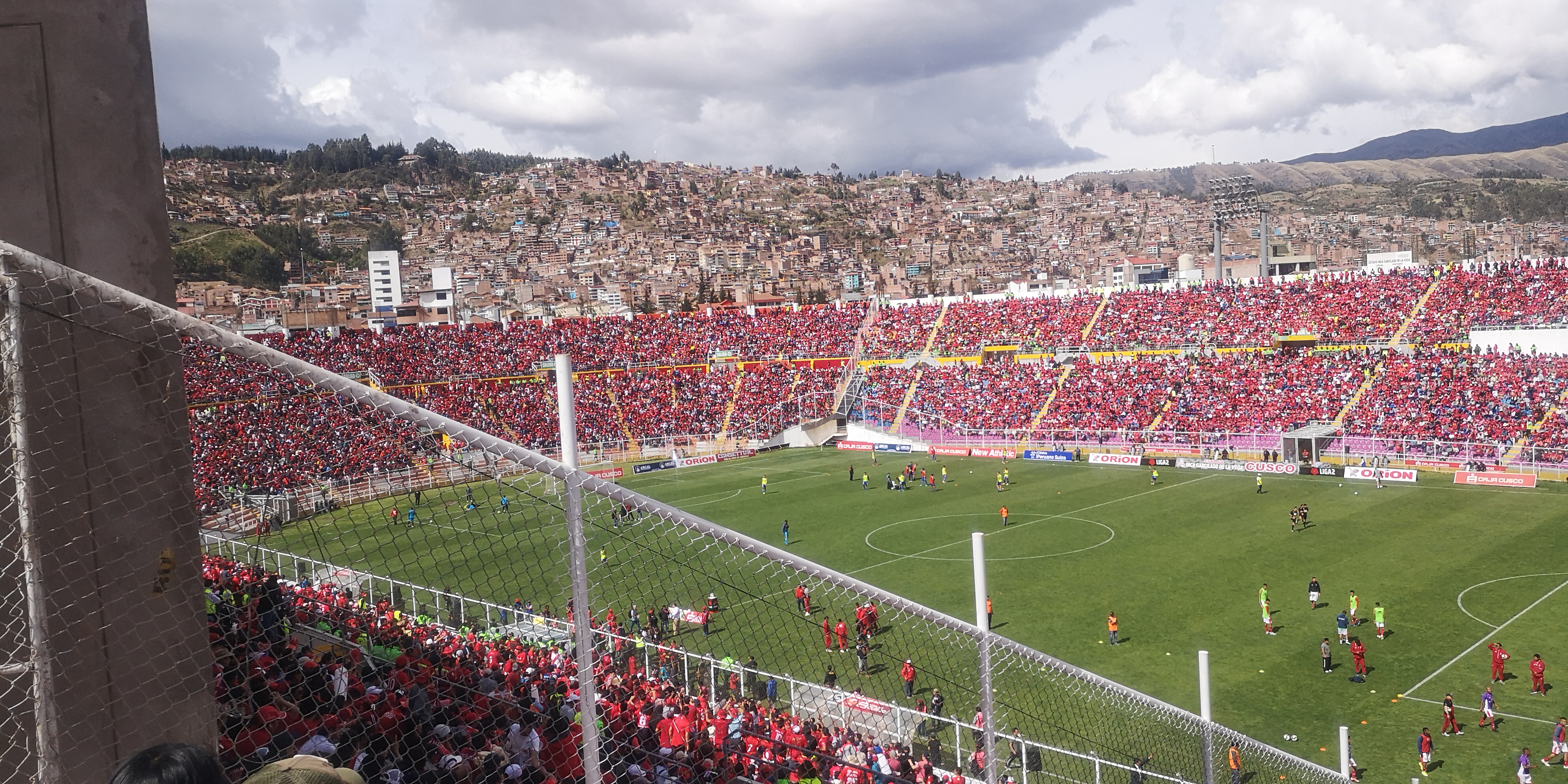
Cienciano fans at Estadio Garcilaso.

Cienciano supporters are among the largest in Peru and second to Deportivo Garcilaso in Cusco. In terms of number of supporters on the national level, Cienciano competes with their rivals, Melgar, for the top five most supported teams in Peru. They also compete with their city rivals, Cusco FC and Deportivo Garcilaso for the majority of supporters in Cusco. In 2023, Cienciano was ranked fourth in terms of most supported teams of the season, containing 4% of the league's overall attendance.

The largest ''barra'' or fan group is known as the La Furia Roja, The Red Fury. It was founded in 1995, initially as the Fvria Roja. It is the official fan group of Cienciano and is situated in the northern stand of the Estadio Garcilaso.

== Rivalries ==
Cienciano has had a long-standing rivalry with Cusco FC and Deportivo Garcilaso, other large clubs in Cusco. These rivalries are known as the Clásico Cusqueño. All three teams currently play in the Peruvian Primera División. Cienciano and Deportivo Garcilaso split the majority of preferences of Cusco.

Cienciano also has another rivalry with Melgar known as the Clásico del sur. Cienciano has a total of 42 wins, with Melgar having 25. The largest defeat was in 1990, where Cienciano lost 5–0. Cienciano's largest result against Melgar was a home win of 5–2 in 2000. Both teams are one of the oldest in Peru. During the second leg of the final of the 2003 Copa Sudamericana, Cienciano played at Melgar's home stadium against Boca Juniors, as Estadio Garcilaso did not meet the requirements for the final. Some Melgar fans went to the final to cheer for Boca, against Cienciano. The rivalry is often considered the third largest in Peru.

== Current squad ==
As of 14 September 2026.

Note: Flags indicate national team as defined under FIFA eligibility rules; some limited exceptions apply. Players may hold more than one non-FIFA nationality.

No.	Pos.	Nation	Player
1	GK	URU	Gonzalo Falcón (on loan from Recoleta)
3	DF	ECU	Kevin Becerra
4	DF	URU	Maximiliano Amondarain
5	MF	URU	Santiago Arias
7	FW	URU	Cristian Souza
8	MF	PER	Gonzalo Aguirre
9	FW	ARG	Juan Romagnoli
10	FW	PER	Alejandro Hohberg
11	FW	ARG	Neri Bandiera
13	DF	PAR	Claudio Nuñez
14	DF	PER	Sebastián Cavero
16	DF	ARG	Marcos Martinich
17	FW	PER	Ray Sandoval
18	FW	PER	Didier La Torre

No.	Pos.	Nation	Player
19	FW	PER	Matías Succar (on loan from Alianza Lima)
21	FW	ECU	Carlos Garcés (captain)
22	FW	PER	Carlos Cabello
25	DF	PER	Renzo Salazar (on loan from Sport Boys)
26	DF	PER	Rotceh Aguilar
27	DF	PER	Alonso Yovera
29	MF	PER	Ademar Robles
30	GK	PER	Jean Franco Roncal
31	GK	PER	Ítalo Espinoza
33	FW	PER	Yván Rojas
39	MF	PER	Henry Caparó (on loan from Sporting Cristal)
88	MF	PER	Gerson Barreto
99	FW	PER	Nadhir Colunga

== Honours ==
=== Senior titles ===
Keys

- Record
- ^{(s)} Shared record

Type	Competition	Titles	Runner-up	Winning years	Runner-up years
National (League)	Primera División	—	3	—	2001, 2005, 2006
National (League)	Liga 2	1	—	2019	—
National (League)	Intermedia (1984–1987)	—	1	—	1984 Zona Sur
National (League)	Copa Perú	—	1	—	1973
Half-year / Short tournament (League)	Torneo Apertura	1	2	2005	2004, 2007
Half-year / Short tournament (League)	Torneo Clausura	2	—	2001, 2006	—
Half-year / Short tournament (League)	Torneo Zona Sur	1	3	1988	1986, 1991–I, 1991–II
International (Cup)	Copa Sudamericana	1	—	2003	—
International (Cup)	Recopa Sudamericana	1	—	2004	—
Regional (League)	Región Sureste	5	—	1967, 1968, 1971, 1972, 1973	—
Regional (League)	Liga Departamental del Cusco	6	—	1966, 1967, 1970, 1971, 1972, 1982	—
Regional (League)	Liga Distrital del Cusco	29	—	1903, 1912, 1913, 1914, 1915, 1924, 1927, 1928, 1929, 1931, 1936, 1944, 1945, 1948, 1952, 1954, 1955, 1956, 1959, 1962, 1964, 1965, 1966, 1967, 1970, 1971, 1972, 1981, 1983	—
Regional (League)	Copa Municipal del Cusco	3	—	1918, 1919, 1920	—

=== Friendlies ===
Type	Competition	Titles	Runner-up	Winning years	Runner-up years
International (Cup)	Copa El Gráfico-Perú	2^{(s)}	—	2004, 2005	—
National (Cup)	Copa Callao	—	1	—	2007

== Performance in CONMEBOL competitions ==
- Copa Libertadores: 6 appearances

2002: Round of 16
2004: First Round
2005: Preliminary Round
2006: Second Round
2007: Second Round
2008: Second Round

- Copa Sudamericana: 7 appearances

2003: Winner
2004: Preliminary Round
2009: Round of 16
2022: First Stage
2023: First Stage
2025: Round of 16
2026: Quarterfinals

- Recopa Sudamericana: 1 appearance

2004: Winner

== Notable players ==
- (Peru) Sergio Ibarra
- (Paraguay) Carlos Lugo
- (Peru) Santiago Acasiete
- (Peru) Juan Carlos Bazalar
- (Peru) Germán Carty
- (Peru) Paolo de la Haza
- (Peru) Julio García
- (Peru) Óscar Ibáñez
- (Peru) Carlos Lobatón
- (Peru) Mauriño Mendoza
- (Peru) Alessandro Morán
- (Peru) Ramón Rodríguez
- (Colombia) Rodrigo Saraz

== Managers ==
- (Peru) Eloy Campos (1977)
- (Peru) Diego Agurto (1986–87)
- (Colombia) Gualberto Martínez Sarabia (1991)
- (Peru) Ramón Quiroga (1992)
- (Peru) Hector Berrío Vega (1993)
- (Peru) Luis Roth (1993)
- (Peru) Freddy Ternero (1994)
- (Paraguay) César Cubilla (1994)
- (Peru) Victor Bustamante (1995–96)
- (Uruguay) Francisco Bertocchi (1995)
- (Peru) Ramón Quiroga (1996–98)
- (Uruguay) Antonio Alzamendi (1998)
- (Peru) Freddy Ternero (2000–01)
- (Uruguay) Carlos Jurado (1999–2000 / 2001)
- (Peru) Teddy Cardama (2002)
- (Peru) Freddy Ternero (2003–04)
- (Ecuador) Carlos Sevilla (2005)
- (Peru) Wilmar Valencia (1 Jan 2005 – 26 Mar 2006)
- (Peru) Julio César Uribe (1 Jan 2007 – 8 Mar 2007)
- (Argentina) José Basualdo (19 March 2007 – 27 Sept 2007)
- (Peru) Franco Navarro (2007–2008)
- (Peru) Julio César Uribe (2008–2009)
- (Argentina) Marcelo Trobbiani (2009)
- (Colombia) José Torres (2009)
- (Colombia) Édgar Ospina (2010)
- (Argentina) Sergio Ibarra (interim) (2010)
- (Argentina) Marcelo Trobbiani (2011)
- (Uruguay) Carlos Jurado (2011–2012)
- (Mexico) Raúl Arias (2012)
- (Uruguay) Mario Viera (2013–2014)
- (Peru) Paul Cominges (2015–2016)
- (Argentina) (Peru) Óscar Ibáñez (2016)
- (Peru) Fredy García (2017)
- (Argentina) (Peru) Sergio Ibarra (2017–2018)
- (Uruguay) Gustavo Roverano (2018)
- (Peru) Duilio Cisneros (2019)
- (Argentina) Marcelo Grioni (2019–2021)
- (Peru) Víctor Rivera (2021)
- (Argentina) Gerardo Ameli (2021–2022)
- (Argentina) César Vigevani (2022)
- (Colombia) Leonel Álvarez (2023)
- (Argentina) Gerardo Ameli (2023)
- (Argentina) (Peru) Óscar Ibáñez (2023–2024)
- (Argentina) Christian Díaz (2024–)

== Women’s football ==
Type	Competition	Titles	Runner-up	Winning years	Runner-up years
Regional (League)	Liga Departamental del Cusco	—	1	—	2025

== See also ==
- Cienciano in South American football
- Once Caldas, another surprise international competition winner in the same year
- 2003 Cienciano season
