= 2026 Liga 1 (Peru) =

Liga 1 Te Apuesto
- Season: 2026
- Dates: 30 January – December 2026
- Relegated: Cajamarca; UTC
- Copa Libertadores: Alianza Lima; Universitario; Sport Huancayo; Melgar
- Copa Sudamericana: Deportivo Garcilaso; Sporting Cristal; Cusco; Cienciano
- Matches: 306
- Goals: 870 (2.84 per match)
- Top goalscorer: Erick Castillo (22 goals)
- Biggest home win: Alianza Lima 8–0 Cusco (18 April)
- Biggest away win: Juan Pablo II 1–4 Universitario (3 May); Los Chankas 0–3 Melgar (15 August); Dep. Moquegua 1–4 Alianza Atlético (30 August); Cajamarca 2–5 Cienciano (4 September)
- Highest scoring: Alianza Lima 8–0 Cusco (18 April); UTC 5–3 Los Chankas (16 November)
- All statistics correct as of 22 November 2026.

The 2026 Liga 1 de Fútbol Profesional (known as the Liga 1 Te Apuesto 2026 for sponsorship reasons) is the 110th season of the Peruvian Primera División, the highest division of Peruvian football. The season started on 30 January and is scheduled to end on 13 December 2026, and the fixture draw was held on 9 January 2026.

Universitario are the defending champions, having won three titles in a row in 2023, 2024 and 2025.

== Teams ==
Eighteen teams take part in this season, one less than the previous season: the top 16 teams of the 2025 tournament, plus the 2025 Liga 2 champions Cajamarca and runner-up Deportivo Moquegua. Both Cajamarca and Deportivo Moquegua got promoted for the first time in their history. The promoted teams replaced Ayacucho, Alianza Universidad and Binacional, who were relegated at the end of the previous season. Binacional were disqualified from the previous season on 19 August 2025, and were relegated to the Liga 2.

=== Team changes ===
| Promoted from 2025 Liga 2 | Relegated from 2025 Liga 1 |
|---|---|
| ▲ Cajamarca (1st) ▲ Deportivo Moquegua (2nd) | ▼ Ayacucho (17th) ▼ Alianza Universidad (18th) ▼ Binacional (Disqualified) |

=== Stadia and locations ===
Locations of the 2026 Liga 1 teams
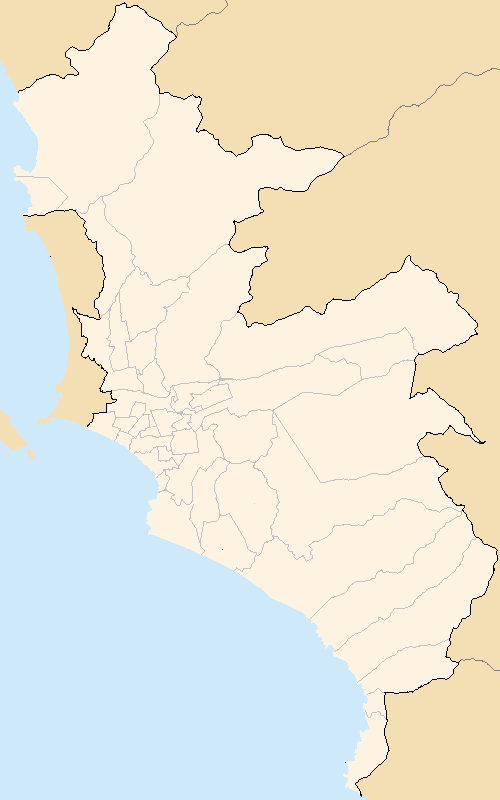
Locations of the 2026 Liga 1 teams – Lima.

| Team | City | Stadium | Capacity |
|---|---|---|---|
| ADT | Tarma | Unión Tarma | 9,100 |
| Alianza Atlético | Sullana | Campeones del 36 | 12,000 |
| Alianza Lima | Lima | Alejandro Villanueva | 35,938 |
| Atlético Grau (Note: Atlético Grau play their home matches at Estadio Campeones del 36 in Sullana and Estadio Municipal Ambrosio Maco Arroyo in La Matanza as their regular stadium Estadio Miguel Grau in Piura is closed for remodeling works.) | Sullana | Campeones del 36 | 12,000 |
| Atlético Grau | La Matanza | Municipal Ambrosio Maco Arroyo | 5,000 |
| Cajamarca | Cajamarca | Héroes de San Ramón | 10,485 |
| Cienciano | Cusco | Garcilaso | 45,056 |
| Comerciantes Unidos | Cutervo | Juan Maldonado Gamarra | 13,680 |
| Cusco | Cusco | Garcilaso | 45,056 |
| Deportivo Garcilaso | Cusco | Garcilaso | 45,056 |
| Deportivo Moquegua | Moquegua | 25 de Noviembre | 21,073 |
| Juan Pablo II College | Chongoyape | Complejo Juan Pablo II | 3,000 |
| Los Chankas | Andahuaylas | Los Chankas | 10,000 |
| Melgar | Arequipa | Virgen de Chapi | 40,370 |
| Sport Boys | Callao | Miguel Grau | 17,000 |
| Sport Huancayo | Huancayo | Huancayo | 20,000 |
| Sporting Cristal | Lima | Alberto Gallardo | 11,600 |
| Universitario | Lima | Monumental | 80,093 |
| UTC | Cajamarca | Héroes de San Ramón | 10,485 |

=== Personnel and kits ===
| Team | Manager | Kit manufacturer | Main shirt sponsors |
|---|---|---|---|
| ADT | (Peru) Víctor Rivera | New Athletic | Caja Huancayo |
| Alianza Atlético | (Argentina) Federico Urciuoli | Walon | |
| Alianza Lima | (Argentina) Pablo Guede | Nike | Apuesta Total, Caja Huancayo |
| Atlético Grau | (Argentina) Gerardo Ameli | Walon | Caja Piura, USS |
| Cajamarca | (Paraguay) Celso Ayala | Convert | Bitel, No Hay Sin Suerte |
| Cienciano | (Argentina) Horacio Melgarejo | Umbro | Caja Cusco |
| Comerciantes Unidos | (Argentina) Claudio Biaggio | Ander Sport | |
| Cusco | (Spain) Javier Rabanal | Adidas | Caja Cusco, No Hay Sin Suerte |
| Deportivo Garcilaso | (Argentina) Lisandro Greppo | Ander Sport | Salkantay Trekking |
| Deportivo Moquegua | (Peru) José Soto | Palant | |
| Juan Pablo II College | (Peru) Jorge Araujo | Hot Bec | Tecno Grass |
| Los Chankas | (Peru) Juan Carlos Bazalar | New Athletic | Caja Ica, UD Trucks |
| Melgar | (Argentina) Miguel Rondelli | Walon | Stake |
| Sport Boys | (Argentina) Carlos Desio | Astro | Apuesta Total |
| Sport Huancayo | (Uruguay) Richard Pellejero | Lotto | Caja Huancayo |
| Sporting Cristal | (Peru) Roberto Mosquera | Puma | Caja Piura, 1XBET |
| Universitario | (Argentina) Fabián Bustos | Marathon | Apuesta Total |
| UTC | (Argentina) Cristian Molins (caretaker) | Astro | Pieers, Punto Original |

=== Managerial changes ===
| Team | Outgoing manager | Manner of departure | Date of vacancy | Position in table | Incoming manager | Date of appointment |
Torneo Apertura
| Deportivo Garcilaso | (Argentina) Carlos Bustos | Mutual agreement | 13 November 2025 | Pre-season | (Argentina) Hernán Lisi | 5 December 2025 |
| ADT | (Argentina) Horacio Melgarejo | End of contract | 20 November 2025 | Pre-season | (Argentina) Pablo Trobbiani | 1 January 2026 |
| Cienciano | (Argentina) Carlos Desio | End of contract | 23 November 2025 | Pre-season | (Argentina) Horacio Melgarejo | 24 November 2025 |
| Cajamarca | (Peru) Juan Carlos Malpica | End of contract | 24 November 2025 | Pre-season | (Peru) Carlos Silvestri | 26 November 2025 |
| Alianza Atlético | (Argentina) Gerardo Ameli | Mutual agreement | 27 November 2025 | Pre-season | (Argentina) Federico Urciuoli | 8 December 2025 |
| Juan Pablo II College | (Peru) Santiago Acasiete | End of contract | 30 November 2025 | Pre-season | (Argentina) Marcelo Zuleta | 15 December 2025 |
| UTC | (Argentina) Hernán Lisi | End of contract | 3 December 2025 | Pre-season | (Argentina) Carlos Bustos | 10 December 2025 |
| Alianza Lima | (Argentina) Néstor Gorosito | Sacked | 7 December 2025 | Pre-season | (Argentina) Pablo Guede | 12 December 2025 |
| Universitario | (Uruguay) Jorge Fossati | Mutual agreement | 11 December 2025 | Pre-season | (Spain) Javier Rabanal | 15 December 2025 |
| Sport Boys | (Peru) Juan Carlos Cabanillas | End of contract | 15 December 2025 | Pre-season | (Colombia) Jaime de la Pava | 22 December 2025 |
| Sport Huancayo | (Uruguay) Richard Pellejero | End of contract | 31 December 2025 | Pre-season | (Peru) Roberto Mosquera | 8 January 2026 |
| Deportivo Garcilaso | (Argentina) Hernán Lisi | Sacked | 4 March 2026 | 13th | (Argentina) Lisandro Greppo (Note: Caretaker manager.) | 4 March 2026 |
| Atlético Grau | (Argentina) Ángel Comizzo | Mutual agreement | 6 March 2026 | 17th | (Argentina) Gerardo Ameli | 8 March 2026 |
| Sport Boys | (Colombia) Jaime de la Pava | Mutual agreement | 11 March 2026 | 17th | (Peru) Guillermo Vásquez | 11 March 2026 |
| Sport Boys | (Peru) Guillermo Vásquez | End of caretaker spell | 17 March 2026 | 18th | (Argentina) Carlos Desio | 17 March 2026 |
| Cajamarca | (Peru) Carlos Silvestri | Sacked | 17 March 2026 | 16th | (Peru) Omar Ríos | 17 March 2026 |
| Deportivo Garcilaso | (Argentina) Lisandro Greppo | End of caretaker spell | 18 March 2026 | 15th | (Argentina) Sebastián Domínguez | 18 March 2026 |
| Melgar | (Peru) Juan Reynoso | Mutual agreement | 21 March 2026 | 7th | (Argentina) Miguel Rondelli | 28 March 2026 |
| Sport Huancayo | (Peru) Roberto Mosquera | Resigned | 22 March 2026 | 15th | (Uruguay) Richard Pellejero | 27 March 2026 |
| Cajamarca | (Peru) Omar Ríos | End of caretaker spell | 25 March 2026 | 18th | (Paraguay) Celso Ayala | 25 March 2026 |
| Sporting Cristal | (Brazil) Paulo Autuori | Mutual agreement | 25 March 2026 | 6th | (Brazil) Zé Ricardo (Note: Iván Bulos was the caretaker manager for the Torneo Apertura 9th round match against Deportivo Moquegua.) | 2 April 2026 |
| Cusco | (Argentina) Miguel Rondelli | Resigned | 28 March 2026 | 8th | (Uruguay) Alejandro Orfila | 30 March 2026 |
| ADT | (Argentina) Pablo Trobbiani | Mutual agreement | 20 April 2026 | 16th | (Argentina) Diego Ripacolli | 20 April 2026 |
| Universitario | (Spain) Javier Rabanal | Mutual agreement | 21 April 2026 | 4th | (Peru) Jorge Araujo | 21 April 2026 |
| Juan Pablo II College | (Argentina) Marcelo Zuleta | Mutual agreement | 5 May 2026 | 14th | (Peru) Edwin Arce | 5 May 2026 |
| Universitario | (Peru) Jorge Araujo | End of caretaker spell | 15 May 2026 | 4th | (Argentina) Héctor Cúper | 11 May 2026 |
| UTC | (Argentina) Carlos Bustos | Mutual agreement | 12 May 2026 | 13th | (Peru) Edwin Arévalo | 12 May 2026 |
| ADT | (Argentina) Diego Ripacolli | Replaced | 17 May 2026 | 10th | (Peru) Teddy Ramírez | 17 May 2026 |
| Juan Pablo II College | (Peru) Edwin Arce | End of caretaker spell | 18 May 2026 | 17th | (Peru) Jorge Araujo | 18 May 2026 |
| Comerciantes Unidos | (Argentina) Claudio Biaggio | Resigned | 19 May 2026 | 10th | (Peru) Daniel Morales | 20 May 2026 |
| UTC | (Peru) Edwin Arévalo | End of caretaker spell | 25 May 2026 | 13th | (Argentina) Cristian Paulucci | 25 May 2026 |
Torneo Clausura
| Cusco | (Uruguay) Alejandro Orfila | Sacked | 2 June 2026 | Pre-tournament | (Spain) Javier Rabanal | 9 June 2026 |
| Sporting Cristal | (Brazil) Zé Ricardo | Mutual agreement | 5 June 2026 | Pre-tournament | (Peru) Roberto Mosquera | 8 June 2026 |
| Comerciantes Unidos | (Peru) Daniel Morales | End of caretaker spell | 21 June 2026 | Pre-tournament | (Colombia) José Eugenio Hernández | 21 June 2026 |
| ADT | (Peru) Teddy Ramírez | Replaced | 29 June 2026 | Pre-tournament | (Uruguay) Francisco Usúcar | 29 June 2026 |
| Deportivo Garcilaso | (Argentina) Sebastián Domínguez | Mutual agreement | 24 July 2026 | 15th | (Argentina) Lisandro Greppo (Note: Originally as caretaker manager, appointed on a permanent basis until the end of the season on 7 August 2026.) | 24 July 2026 |
| ADT | (Uruguay) Francisco Usúcar | Sacked | 25 August 2026 | 17th | (Peru) Juan Cahuas | 25 August 2026 |
| UTC | (Argentina) Cristian Paulucci | Mutual agreement | 31 August 2026 | 18th | (Argentina) Cristian Molins (Note: Caretaker manager. Miguel Ángel Zahzú was appointed as UTC manager on 2 October 2026, but he left three days later as the club did not register him with the Peruvian Football Federation.) | 31 August 2026 |
| ADT | (Peru) Juan Cahuas | End of caretaker spell | 2 September 2026 | 17th | (Peru) Víctor Rivera | 2 September 2026 |
| Los Chankas | (Argentina) Walter Paolella | Sacked | 12 September 2026 | 16th | (Peru) Juan Carlos Bazalar | 15 September 2026 |
| Universitario | (Argentina) Héctor Cúper | Mutual agreement | 29 September 2026 | 2nd | (Argentina) Fabián Bustos | 30 September 2026 |
| Deportivo Moquegua | (Peru) Jaime Serna | Sacked | 12 October 2026 | 16th | (Peru) José Soto | 12 October 2026 |
| Comerciantes Unidos | (Colombia) José Eugenio Hernández | Sacked | 21 October 2026 | 15th | (Argentina) Claudio Biaggio | 21 October 2026 |

== Torneo Apertura ==
The Torneo Apertura was the first tournament of the 2026 season, held from 30 January to 31 May 2026. This tournament was played under a single round-robin format, with the 18 teams playing each other once for a total of 17 rounds. Alianza Lima won the tournament with one match in hand after defeating Los Chankas 3–0 on 23 May 2026.

Alianza Lima, as winners of this tournament, advanced to the Playoffs as they assured a top eight finish in the aggregate table at the end of the season.

=== Standings ===
| Pos | Team | Pld | W | D | L | GF | GA | GD | Pts | Qualification |
|---|---|---|---|---|---|---|---|---|---|---|
| 1 | Alianza Lima | 17 | 12 | 4 | 1 | 30 | 8 | +22 | 40 | Advance to the Playoffs |
| 2 | Los Chankas | 17 | 10 | 4 | 3 | 25 | 21 | +4 | 34 | |
| 3 | Cienciano | 17 | 10 | 3 | 4 | 34 | 22 | +12 | 33 | |
| 4 | Universitario | 17 | 8 | 5 | 4 | 24 | 15 | +9 | 29 | |
| 5 | Melgar | 17 | 8 | 4 | 5 | 29 | 20 | +9 | 28 | |
| 6 | Cusco | 17 | 8 | 3 | 6 | 21 | 24 | −3 | 27 | |
| 7 | Deportivo Garcilaso | 17 | 7 | 5 | 5 | 21 | 18 | +3 | 26 | |
| 8 | Alianza Atlético | 17 | 5 | 6 | 6 | 20 | 18 | +2 | 21 | |
| 9 | Comerciantes Unidos | 17 | 5 | 6 | 6 | 18 | 20 | −2 | 21 | |
| 10 | ADT | 17 | 5 | 5 | 7 | 22 | 21 | +1 | 20 | |
| 11 | Sport Boys | 17 | 5 | 5 | 7 | 15 | 19 | −4 | 20 | |
| 12 | Sporting Cristal | 17 | 5 | 4 | 8 | 28 | 30 | −2 | 19 | |
| 13 | Deportivo Moquegua | 17 | 5 | 3 | 9 | 17 | 24 | −7 | 18 | |
| 14 | Cajamarca | 17 | 4 | 5 | 8 | 23 | 28 | −5 | 17 | |
| 15 | Atlético Grau | 17 | 4 | 4 | 9 | 12 | 18 | −6 | 16 | |
| 16 | Sport Huancayo | 17 | 4 | 4 | 9 | 21 | 31 | −10 | 16 | |
| 17 | Juan Pablo II College | 17 | 4 | 4 | 9 | 22 | 40 | −18 | 16 | |
| 18 | UTC (Note: UTC were deducted five points as punishment for failing to pay debts.) | 17 | 4 | 6 | 7 | 21 | 26 | −5 | 13 | |

Source: Liga 1, Soccerway
Rules for classification: 1) Points; 2) Goal difference; 3) Goals for; 4) Fair play points; 5) Drawing of lots.

=== Results ===
| Home \ Away | ADT | AAS | ALI | CAG | CAJ | CIE | COM | CUS | GAR | MOQ | JPA | CHA | MEL | SBA | SHU | CRI | UNI | UTC |
|---|---|---|---|---|---|---|---|---|---|---|---|---|---|---|---|---|---|---|
| ADT | | | 0–1 | 1–0 | | | 2–0 | 1–2 | | | 2–3 | 4–0 | 1–1 | 1–0 | | | | 2–2 |
| Alianza Atlético | 0–0 | | 0–0 | 2–2 | 1–1 | | | 1–0 | | 3–0 | | | | 0–1 | 4–1 | | | |
| Alianza Lima | | | | | | | 2–1 | 8–0 | | 2–1 | 2–0 | 3–0 | 3–1 | 1–0 | | 1–1 | | |
| Atlético Grau | | | 0–1 | | 1–0 | 1–2 | | | 0–0 | 1–0 | 1–2 | | | | 0–0 | 4–1 | | |
| Cajamarca | 2–2 | | 1–1 | | | | 3–4 | | 1–1 | | | 0–1 | 3–1 | 3–2 | | 3–1 | | |
| Cienciano | 3–2 | 1–1 | 0–1 | | 3–0 | | 1–0 | | | 2–1 | 6–1 | | | 3–1 | | 3–2 | | |
| Comerciantes Unidos | | 1–0 | | 3–1 | | | | | 0–0 | 1–0 | | 1–1 | 1–1 | | | 1–0 | 0–0 | 1–2 |
| Cusco | | | | 1–0 | 1–0 | 1–2 | 3–1 | | 1–0 | | | 1–1 | | | 2–1 | | 1–1 | |
| Deportivo Garcilaso | 1–0 | 2–1 | 1–1 | | | 2–3 | | | | | 4–1 | | 1–0 | 3–2 | | 1–1 | | 2–0 |
| Deportivo Moquegua | 2–2 | | | | 2–1 | | | 1–2 | 1–0 | | 3–0 | | | | 2–1 | | 0–0 | 2–3 |
| Juan Pablo II College | | 0–2 | | | 3–3 | | 2–2 | 2–1 | | | | 2–3 | 1–1 | | | 0–2 | 1–4 | 2–1 |
| Los Chankas | | 1–0 | | 2–0 | | 1–0 | | | 0–1 | 1–0 | | | | | 3–2 | 3–2 | 3–1 | 2–2 |
| Melgar | | 3–1 | | 0–0 | | 2–0 | | 1–3 | | 4–0 | | 1–2 | | | 4–1 | | 2–1 | 2–0 |
| Sport Boys | | | | 1–0 | | | 1–0 | 1–0 | | 0–0 | 1–1 | 1–1 | 1–3 | | 3–0 | | 0–0 | |
| Sport Huancayo | 0–1 | | 1–2 | | 2–0 | 2–2 | 1–1 | | 2–1 | | 2–1 | | | | | 2–1 | | |
| Sporting Cristal | 2–1 | 3–1 | | | | | | 2–2 | | 1–2 | | | 1–2 | 3–0 | | | 2–2 | 3–2 |
| Universitario | 2–0 | 1–2 | 1–0 | 0–1 | 1–0 | 2–1 | | | 4–1 | | | | | | 2–1 | | | 2–0 |
| UTC | | 1–1 | 0–1 | 2–0 | 1–2 | 2–2 | | 1–0 | | | | | | 0–0 | 2–2 | | | |

Source: Liga 1, Soccerway
Legend: Blue = home team win; Yellow = draw; Red = away team win.

=== Attendances ===
Liga 1 clubs listed by home league attendance in the 2026 Apertura tournament:

| Pos | Club | Total attendance |
|---|---|---|
| 1 | Universitario | 333,899 |
| 2 | Alianza Lima | 218,520 |
| 3 | Melgar | 80,131 |
| 4 | Cienciano | 78,235 |
| 5 | Sporting Cristal | 56,098 |
| 6 | Sport Boys | 53,792 |
| 7 | Deportivo Garcilaso | 41,044 |
| 8 | Comerciantes Unidos | 32,240 |
| 9 | Cusco | 25,247 |
| 10 | Juan Pablo II College | 25,245 |
| 11 | Cajamarca | 21,961 |
| 12 | ADT | 20,939 |
| 13 | Sport Huancayo | 18,023 |
| 14 | Alianza Atlético | 17,782 |
| 15 | Deportivo Moquegua | 14,619 |
| 16 | Los Chankas | 13,055 |
| 17 | UTC | 11,959 |
| 18 | Atlético Grau | 11,829 |

== Torneo Clausura ==
The Torneo Clausura was the second and final tournament of the 2026 season, held from 17 July to 22 November 2026. Similar to the Torneo Apertura, it was played under a single round-robin format, with the same fixture as the Apertura but with reversed home-and-away order for matches.

Sport Huancayo were the winners, clinching the Torneo Clausura title on the final day after defeating Universitario 4–1. By winning this tournament and also securing themselves a top eight placement in the aggregate table at the end of the season, Sport Huancayo also advanced to the Playoffs.

=== Standings ===
| Pos | Team | Pld | W | D | L | GF | GA | GD | Pts | Qualification |
|---|---|---|---|---|---|---|---|---|---|---|
| 1 | Sport Huancayo | 17 | 12 | 1 | 4 | 31 | 19 | +12 | 37 | Advance to the Playoffs |
| 2 | Sporting Cristal | 17 | 11 | 2 | 4 | 39 | 19 | +20 | 35 | |
| 3 | Alianza Lima | 17 | 9 | 5 | 3 | 28 | 16 | +12 | 32 | |
| 4 | Universitario | 17 | 9 | 5 | 3 | 36 | 28 | +8 | 32 | |
| 5 | Deportivo Garcilaso | 17 | 9 | 3 | 5 | 31 | 19 | +12 | 30 | |
| 6 | Melgar | 17 | 8 | 6 | 3 | 28 | 19 | +9 | 30 | |
| 7 | Alianza Atlético | 17 | 9 | 2 | 6 | 30 | 31 | −1 | 29 | |
| 8 | Sport Boys | 17 | 7 | 6 | 4 | 25 | 19 | +6 | 27 | |
| 9 | Juan Pablo II College | 17 | 7 | 5 | 5 | 28 | 21 | +7 | 26 | |
| 10 | Cusco | 17 | 8 | 1 | 8 | 27 | 25 | +2 | 25 | |
| 11 | Atlético Grau | 17 | 6 | 3 | 8 | 21 | 25 | −4 | 21 | |
| 12 | Comerciantes Unidos | 17 | 3 | 8 | 6 | 29 | 30 | −1 | 17 | |
| 13 | Cienciano | 17 | 5 | 2 | 10 | 21 | 28 | −7 | 17 | |
| 14 | Deportivo Moquegua | 17 | 3 | 6 | 8 | 12 | 25 | −13 | 15 | |
| 15 | Cajamarca | 17 | 4 | 2 | 11 | 23 | 42 | −19 | 14 | |
| 16 | Los Chankas | 17 | 3 | 5 | 9 | 18 | 36 | −18 | 14 | |
| 17 | ADT | 17 | 2 | 7 | 8 | 16 | 28 | −12 | 13 | |
| 18 | UTC (Note: UTC were deducted five points as punishment for failing to pay debts.) | 17 | 2 | 3 | 12 | 22 | 35 | −13 | 4 | |

Source: Liga 1, Soccerway
Rules for classification: 1) Points; 2) Goal difference; 3) Goals for; 4) Fair play points; 5) Drawing of lots.

=== Results ===
| Home \ Away | ADT | AAS | ALI | CAG | CAJ | CIE | COM | CUS | GAR | MOQ | JPA | CHA | MEL | SBA | SHU | CRI | UNI | UTC |
|---|---|---|---|---|---|---|---|---|---|---|---|---|---|---|---|---|---|---|
| ADT | | 1–1 | | | 0–0 | 2–1 | | | 0–1 | 2–0 | | | | | 1–3 | 1–1 | 1–2 | |
| Alianza Atlético | | | | | | 1–0 | 2–1 | | 3–2 | | 1–0 | 3–1 | 1–1 | | | 3–1 | 1–4 | 3–2 |
| Alianza Lima | 2–0 | 3–1 | | 3–1 | 5–0 | 1–0 | | | 0–1 | | | | | | 2–1 | | 1–2 | 1–0 |
| Atlético Grau | 1–1 | 3–1 | | | | | 1–0 | 3–0 | | | | 0–0 | 1–0 | 0–1 | | | 1–3 | 3–1 |
| Cajamarca | | 2–0 | | 1–3 | | 2–5 | | 2–1 | | 0–1 | 2–2 | | | | 0–2 | | 2–3 | 1–3 |
| Cienciano | | | | 3–0 | | | | 1–2 | 0–0 | | | 1–1 | 1–3 | | 1–2 | | 2–0 | 1–0 |
| Comerciantes Unidos | 2–2 | | 2–2 | | 2–3 | 3–1 | | 3–1 | | | 1–1 | | | 3–3 | 0–1 | | | |
| Cusco | 2–2 | 4–1 | 1–2 | | | | | | | 2–0 | 2–0 | | 0–1 | 0–1 | | 3–1 | | 4–1 |
| Deportivo Garcilaso | | | | 4–2 | 2–1 | | 0–0 | 4–1 | | 2–0 | | 4–1 | | | 0–1 | | 4–0 | |
| Deportivo Moquegua | | 1–4 | 0–1 | 2–1 | | 0–2 | 2–2 | | | | | 0–0 | 0–0 | 1–1 | | 1–2 | | |
| Juan Pablo II College | 5–1 | | 1–1 | 0–0 | | 2–0 | | | 2–2 | 4–0 | | | | 2–0 | 2–0 | | | |
| Los Chankas | 2–1 | | 1–1 | | 1–2 | | 3–2 | 0–1 | | | 3–4 | | 0–3 | 1–0 | | | | |
| Melgar | 3–0 | | 1–1 | | 2–4 | | 1–1 | | 4–2 | | 2–1 | | | 1–1 | | 2–1 | | |
| Sport Boys | 2–0 | 1–3 | 1–1 | | 4–2 | 5–1 | | | 1–0 | | | | | | | 1–0 | | 0–0 |
| Sport Huancayo | | 4–1 | | 2–0 | | | | 2–1 | | 0–2 | | 1–1 | 2–0 | 2–1 | | | 4–1 | 3–2 |
| Sporting Cristal | | | 3–2 | 3–1 | 5–0 | 4–1 | 4–2 | | 1–0 | | 2–0 | 5–0 | | | 4–1 | | | |
| Universitario | | | | | | | 2–2 | 2–1 | | 2–2 | 3–0 | 3–0 | 2–2 | 2–2 | | 1–1 | | |
| UTC | 1–1 | | | | | | 1–3 | | 2–3 | 0–0 | 1–2 | 5–3 | 1–2 | | | 0–1 | 2–4 | |

Source: Liga 1, Soccerway
Legend: Blue = home team win; Yellow = draw; Red = away team win.

== Aggregate table ==
Both stages (Torneo Apertura and Torneo Clausura) of the season were aggregated into a single league table to determine international qualification as well as relegation. The top two teams in this table at the end of the season along with the Torneo Clausura winners Sport Huancayo qualified for the Playoffs as well as the Copa Libertadores, with third-placed team Melgar also qualifying for the Copa Libertadores (entering the first stage of the continental competition), while the best four teams that did not qualify for the Copa Libertadores entered the Copa Sudamericana, and the bottom two teams were relegated to Liga 2.

| Pos | Team | Pld | W | D | L | GF | GA | GD | Pts | Qualification |
|---|---|---|---|---|---|---|---|---|---|---|
| 1 | Alianza Lima (Q) | 34 | 21 | 9 | 4 | 59 | 24 | +35 | 72 | Advance to Playoffs and qualification for Copa Libertadores group stage |
| 2 | Universitario (T) | 34 | 17 | 10 | 7 | 60 | 43 | +17 | 61 | Advance to Playoffs and qualification for Copa Libertadores (Note: Stage to be determined. The semi-final winners will qualify for the Copa Libertadores group stage, while the semi-final losers will qualify for the Copa Libertadores second stage.) |
| 3 | Melgar (Q) | 34 | 16 | 10 | 8 | 57 | 39 | +18 | 58 | Qualification for Copa Libertadores first stage |
| 4 | Deportivo Garcilaso (Q) | 34 | 16 | 8 | 10 | 52 | 37 | +15 | 56 | Qualification for Copa Sudamericana first stage |
| 5 | Sporting Cristal (Q) | 34 | 16 | 6 | 12 | 67 | 49 | +18 | 54 | Qualification for Copa Sudamericana first stage |
| 6 | Sport Huancayo (T) | 34 | 16 | 5 | 13 | 52 | 50 | +2 | 53 | Advance to Playoffs and qualification for Copa Libertadores |
| 7 | Cusco (Q) | 34 | 16 | 4 | 14 | 48 | 49 | −1 | 52 | Qualification for Copa Sudamericana first stage |
| 8 | Cienciano (Q) | 34 | 15 | 5 | 14 | 55 | 50 | +5 | 50 | Qualification for Copa Sudamericana first stage |
| 9 | Alianza Atlético | 34 | 14 | 8 | 12 | 50 | 49 | +1 | 50 | |
| 10 | Los Chankas | 34 | 13 | 9 | 12 | 43 | 57 | −14 | 48 | |
| 11 | Sport Boys (Note: Sport Boys were deducted four points as punishment for failing to pay debts.) | 34 | 12 | 11 | 11 | 40 | 38 | +2 | 43 | |
| 12 | Juan Pablo II College | 34 | 11 | 9 | 14 | 50 | 61 | −11 | 42 | |
| 13 | Comerciantes Unidos | 34 | 8 | 14 | 12 | 47 | 50 | −3 | 38 | |
| 14 | Atlético Grau | 34 | 10 | 7 | 17 | 33 | 43 | −10 | 37 | |
| 15 | Deportivo Moquegua | 34 | 8 | 9 | 17 | 29 | 49 | −20 | 33 | |
| 16 | ADT (Note: ADT were deducted one point as punishment for failing to pay debts.) | 34 | 7 | 12 | 15 | 38 | 50 | −12 | 32 | |
| 17 | Cajamarca (Note: Cajamarca were deducted two points as punishment for failing to pay debts.) (R) | 34 | 8 | 7 | 19 | 46 | 70 | −24 | 29 | Relegation to Liga 2 |
| 18 | UTC (Note: UTC were deducted ten points as punishment for failing to pay debts.) (R) | 34 | 6 | 9 | 19 | 43 | 61 | −18 | 17 | Relegation to Liga 2 |

Source: Liga 1
Rules for classification: 1) Points; 2) Goal difference; 3) Goals for; 4) Head-to-head points; 5) Head-to-head goal difference; 6) Head-to-head goals for; 7) Fair play points; 8) Drawing of lots.
(Q) Qualified for the phase indicated; (R) Relegated; (T) Qualified, but not yet for the particular phase indicated

== Playoffs ==
The playoffs to decide the Liga 1 champion were set to be contested by the winners of the Apertura and Clausura tournaments (provided they end the season in the top eight of the aggregate table) as well as the top two teams in the season's aggregate table (other than the tournament winners). These four teams would play two double-legged semi-final matchups, with the winners contesting the finals over two legs.

However, with the Apertura winners Alianza Lima also placing first in the aggregate table, they received a bye to the finals and only one semi-final series will be contested by the Clausura winners Sport Huancayo and the aggregate table's second-placed team Universitario to decide the other finalist.

Both finalists will qualify for the group stage of the 2027 Copa Libertadores, while the losing semi-finalist will qualify for the Copa Libertadores second stage. The playoffs will be contested from 29 November to 13 December 2026.

| Semi-final | Finals |
| Sport Huancayo |
| Universitario |
| Universitario | Semi-final winners |
| | Alianza Lima |

=== Semi-final ===
29 November 2026
15:00 UTC−5

| Sport Huancayo | v | Universitario |

Estadio Huancayo, Huancayo

4 December 2026
20:30 UTC−5

| Universitario | v | Sport Huancayo |

Estadio Monumental, Lima

=== Finals ===
8 December 2026
--:-- UTC−5

| Semi-final winners | v | Alianza Lima |

13 December 2026
--:-- UTC−5

| Alianza Lima | v | Semi-final winners |

Estadio Alejandro Villanueva, Lima

== Top scorers ==
As of 22 November 2026

| Rank | Player | Club | Goals |
|---|---|---|---|
| 1 | (Ecuador) Erick Castillo | Alianza Lima | 22 |
| 2 | (Argentina) Facundo Callejo | Cusco | 19 |
| 3 | (Ecuador) Carlos Garcés | Cienciano | 18 |
| 3 | (Peru) Alex Valera | Universitario | 18 |
| 5 | (Argentina) Hernán Barcos | Cajamarca / Sporting Cristal | 16 |
| 6 | (Argentina) Bernardo Cuesta | Melgar | 15 |
| 7 | (Peru) Jhonny Vidales | Melgar | 14 |
| 8 | (Peru) Luis Iberico | Sporting Cristal | 12 |
| 8 | (Argentina) Javier Sanguinetti | Sport Huancayo | 12 |
| 10 | (Peru) Alejandro Hohberg | Cienciano | 11 |
| 10 | (Peru) Beto da Silva | Deportivo Garcilaso | 11 |
| 10 | (Argentina) Matías Sen | Comerciantes Unidos | 11 |
| 10 | (Argentina) Franco Torres | Los Chankas | 11 |

Source: Ovación

== See also ==
- 2026 Copa de la Liga
- 2026 Liga 2
- 2026 Liga 3
- 2026 Copa Perú
- 2026 Ligas Departamentales del Perú
- 2026 Tradición Copera
- 2026 Liga Femenina
- 2026 Liga Nacional Juvenil FPF
