= Liga Nacional Juvenil FPF =

- Founded: 2025; 1 year ago
- First season: 2025
- Country: Peru
- Number of clubs: 22
- International cup: U-20 Copa Libertadores
- Current champions: Sporting Cristal (1st title) (2025)
- Most championships: Sporting Cristal (1 title)
- Current: 2026 season

The Liga Nacional Juvenil FPF is the official youth football competition in Peru for under-18 and under-16 categorias, featuring clubs from Liga 1 and Liga 2. The Peruvian Football Federation established the competition in 2025 under the name Torneo Juvenil Sub-18.

== History ==
=== Background ===
In 2021, due to the COVID-19 pandemic, the Torneo de Promoción y Reservas was canceled and was replaced by the Copa Generación Sub-18.

=== Creation ===
With the inclusion of Liga 3 in the Peruvian football league system in 2025, it was a given that the Torneo de Promoción y Reservas would cease to exist. Although it is expected that young players will have more exposure in this new competition, which also includes clubs from Copa Perú and Liga 2, it will not be the only platform for them to showcase their talent. The creation of this Third Division of national football also suggested a reorganization of youth competitions, which will arrive with the Under-18 League, a championship that is also planned for 2025.

=== Torneo Juvenil Sub-18 ===
Sporting Cristal were crowned 2025 Torneo Juvenil Sub-18 champions after a dominant 3–0 victory over Alianza Lima in the second leg of the final at the La Florida training ground. The first leg, played at the Esther Grande de Bentín stadium, had finished in a goalless draw. The 3–0 result allowed the Rimense team, coached by Rubén Díaz, to claim the Torneo Juvenil Sub-18 title and qualify for the 2026 U-20 Copa Libertadores, as well as the 2026 Liga 3.

=== Liga Nacional Juvenil FPF ===
On April 23, 2026, the Peruvian Football Federation officially launched the Liga Nacional Juvenil FPF, a new competition that integrates the under-18 and under-16 categories. The tournament will be played in three stages: Phase I, Phase II, and playoffs.

In its first stage (group phase), 22 clubs will participate (18 from Liga 1 and 4 from Liga 2) and will be divided into three regional groups (North, Central, and South), competing under a double round-robin format.

Qualification for Phase II will be determined by the combined standings of both categories (under-18 and under-16), with the top four clubs from each group advancing.

The qualified teams will then be drawn into two groups of six clubs each, where they will again compete in a double round-robin format. At the end of this stage, the top two teams from each group will advance to the playoffs.

The semifinals will be played over two legs, while the final will be a single match held at the hybrid pitch of the VIDENA.

The U-18 champion will qualify for the 2027 U-20 Copa Libertadores.

== Teams ==
=== Stadia and locations ===
Locations of the 2026 Liga Nacional Juvenil teams
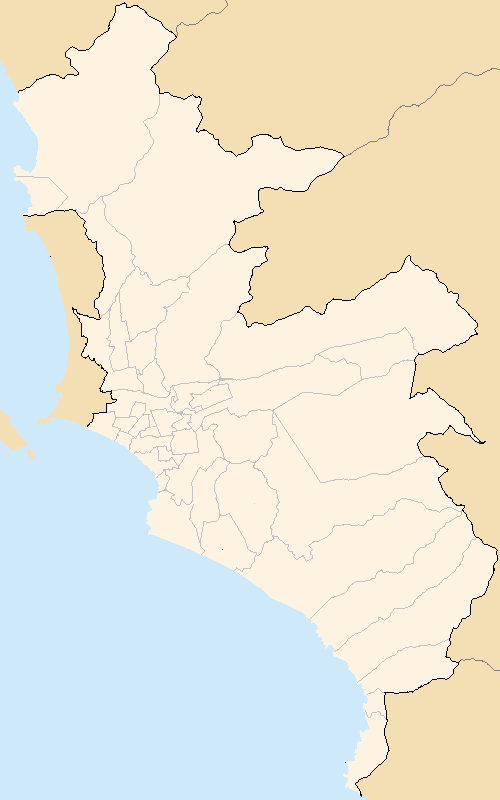
Locations of the 2026 Liga Nacional Juvenil teams – Lima.

Team	City	Stadium	Capacity
Academia Cantolao	Callao	Miguel Grau	17,000
ADT	Tarma	Unión Tarma	9,100
Alianza Atlético	Sullana	Campeones del 36	12,000
Alianza Lima	Lima	Alejandro Villanueva	35,938
Atlético Grau	Piura	Miguel Grau	22,200
Cajamarca	Cajamarca	Cristo El Señor	20,000
Carlos A. Mannucci	Trujillo	Mansiche	25,036
Cienciano	Cusco	Garcilaso	45,056
Comerciantes Unidos	Cutervo	Juan Maldonado Gamarra	13,680
Cusco	Cusco	Garcilaso	45,056
Deportivo Garcilaso	Cusco	Garcilaso	45,056
Deportivo Moquegua	Moquegua	25 de Noviembre	21,073
Juan Pablo II College	Chongoyape	Complejo Juan Pablo II	3,000
Los Chankas	Andahuaylas	Los Chankas	10,000
Melgar	Arequipa	Virgen de Chapi	40,370
Sport Boys	Callao	Miguel Grau	17,000
Sport Huancayo	Huancayo	Huancayo	20,000
Sporting Cristal	Lima	Alberto Gallardo	11,600
Universidad César Vallejo	Trujillo	César Acuña Peralta	2,000
Universidad San Martín	Lima	Villa Deportiva USMP	1,249
Universitario	Lima	Monumental	80,093
UTC	Cajamarca	Héroes de San Ramón	10,485

== U-16 Tournament ==
=== List of champions ===
- (In bracket, title count):

Ed.	Season	Champion	Runner-up	Winning manager	Top scorer
1	2026				

== U-18 Tournament ==
=== List of champions ===
- (In bracket, title count):

Ed.	Season	Champion	Runner-up	Winning manager	Top scorer
1	2025	Sporting Cristal (1)	Alianza Lima	(Peru) Rubén Diaz	(Peru) José Ryu Yabiku (Melgar, 17 goals)
2	2026				

=== Titles by club ===
Rank	Club	Winners	Runners-up	Winning years	Runners-up years
1	Sporting Cristal	1	—	2025	—

=== Titles by region ===
Region	Nº of titles	Clubs
Lima	1	Sporting Cristal

== Half-year / Short tournaments ==
=== Apertura and Clausura seasons ===
Season		Champion	Runner-up
2025	Apertura	Sporting Cristal	Universitario de Deportes
2025	Clausura	Alianza Lima	Sporting Cristal

== See also ==
- Torneo de Promoción y Reservas
- 2021 U-18 Copa Generación
