= 2026 Liga Nacional Juvenil FPF =

Liga Nacional Juvenil FPF
- Season: 2026
- Dates: 2026
- Country: Peru
- Teams: 22

The 2026 Liga Nacional Juvenil FPF will be the first edition under its current name (previously known as the Torneo Juvenil Sub-18) and is the official youth football competition in Peru for the under-18 and under-16 categories, featuring clubs from Liga 1 and Liga 2.

On April 23, 2026, the Peruvian Football Federation officially launched the Liga Nacional Juvenil FPF, a new competition that integrates the under-18 and under-16 categories. The tournament will be played in three stages: Phase I, Phase II, and playoffs.

== Competition format ==
In its first stage (group phase), 22 clubs will participate (18 from Liga 1 and 4 from Liga 2) and will be divided into three regional groups (North, Central, and South), competing under a double round-robin format.

Qualification for second stage will be determined by the combined standings of both categories (under-18 and under-16), with the top four clubs from each group advancing.

The qualified teams will then be drawn into two groups of six clubs each, where they will again compete in a double round-robin format. At the end of this stage, the top two teams from each group will advance to the playoffs.

The semifinals will be played over two legs, while the final will be a single match held at the hybrid pitch of the VIDENA.

The U-18 champion will qualify for the 2027 U-20 Copa Libertadores.

== Teams ==
=== Stadia and locations ===
Locations of the 2026 Liga Nacional Juvenil teams
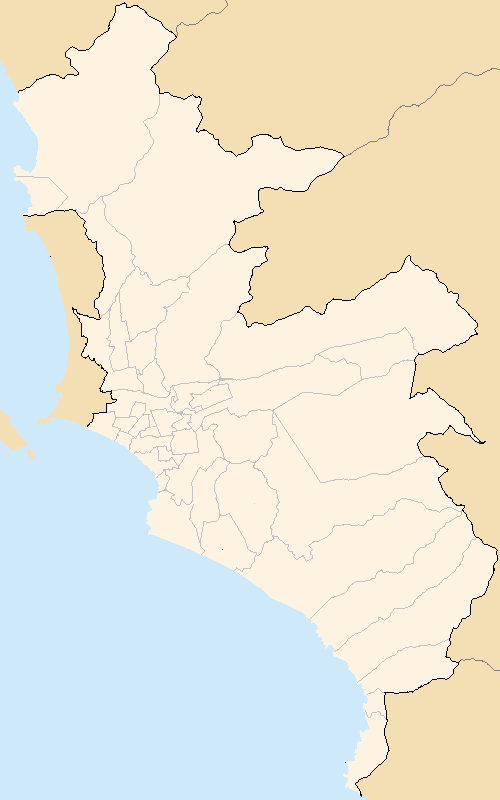
Locations of the 2026 Liga Nacional Juvenil teams – Lima.

Team	City	Stadium	Capacity
Academia Cantolao	Callao	Miguel Grau	17,000
ADT	Tarma	Unión Tarma	9,100
Alianza Atlético	Sullana	Campeones del 36	12,000
Alianza Lima	Lima	Alejandro Villanueva	35,938
Atlético Grau	Piura	Miguel Grau	22,200
Cajamarca	Cajamarca	Cristo El Señor	20,000
Carlos A. Mannucci	Trujillo	Mansiche	25,036
Cienciano	Cusco	Garcilaso	45,056
Comerciantes Unidos	Cutervo	Juan Maldonado Gamarra	13,680
Cusco	Cusco	Garcilaso	45,056
Deportivo Garcilaso	Cusco	Garcilaso	45,056
Deportivo Moquegua	Moquegua	25 de Noviembre	21,073
Juan Pablo II College	Chongoyape	Complejo Juan Pablo II	3,000
Los Chankas	Andahuaylas	Los Chankas	10,000
Melgar	Arequipa	Virgen de Chapi	40,370
Sport Boys	Callao	Miguel Grau	17,000
Sport Huancayo	Huancayo	Huancayo	20,000
Sporting Cristal	Lima	Alberto Gallardo	11,600
Universidad César Vallejo	Trujillo	César Acuña Peralta	2,000
Universidad San Martín	Lima	Villa Deportiva USMP	1,249
Universitario	Lima	Monumental	80,093
UTC	Cajamarca	Héroes de San Ramón	10,485

== U-16 tournament ==
=== First stage ===
==== Group A (North) ====
Pos	Team	Pld	W	D	L	GF	GA	GD	Pts	UCV	CAM	JPA	AAS	CAG	CAJ	UTC	COM
1	Universidad César Vallejo	14	11	1	2	53	14	+39	34		4–3	4–0	3–3	3–0	6–1	6–0	6–0
2	Carlos A. Mannucci	14	11	1	2	46	19	+27	34	1–2		2–1	5–1	4–2	4–1	1–0	10–1
3	Juan Pablo II College	14	8	2	4	34	18	+16	26	2–1	1–2		5–2	6–1	2–0	3–1	4–0
4	Alianza Atlético	14	7	2	5	29	36	−7	23	1–7	2–2	3–2		2–1	3–1	1–2	3–2
5	Atlético Grau	14	6	1	7	19	30	−11	19	0–7	1–3	0–0	0–1		1–0	3–0	3–2
6	Cajamarca	14	3	1	10	17	33	−16	10	0–1	1–3	0–3	3–1	0–3		1–3	4–1
7	UTC	14	3	0	11	16	36	−20	9	3–0	0–1	0–3	2–3	2–3	2–4		1–2
8	Comerciantes Unidos	14	2	2	10	20	49	−29	8	0–3	2–5	2–2	1–3	0–1	2–2	5–2	

Updated to match(es) played on 20 August 2026. Source:
Legend: Blue = home team win; Yellow = draw; Red = away team win.
Rules for classification: 1) Points; 2) Goal difference; 3) Goals for; 4) Fair play points; 5) Drawing of lots.

==== Group B (Center) ====
Pos	Team	Pld	W	D	L	GF	GA	GD	Pts	ALI	CRI	UNI	CAN	USM	SBA	ADT	SHU
1	Alianza Lima	14	11	2	1	31	11	+20	35		1–2	2–0	2–0	2–1	3–0	2–1	0–0
2	Sporting Cristal	14	9	3	2	39	19	+20	30	0–3		2–2	3–0	0–2	7–2	2–1	4–1
3	Universitario	14	8	3	3	37	25	+12	27	2–4	2–2		4–2	4–1	2–2	5–0	4–0
4	Academia Cantolao	14	5	2	7	21	26	−5	17	1–2	0–5	1–3		–	1–0	3–1	5–0
5	Universidad San Martín	14	5	4	5	25	23	+2	19	1–1	0–2	–	1–1		1–3	1–1	2–0
6	Sport Boys	14	4	2	8	22	32	−10	14	1–3	2–5	1–2	1–0	1–2		1–0	5–0
7	ADT	14	4	2	8	21	26	−5	14	0–3	2–2	2–3	0–1	3–1	5–1		–
8	Sport Huancayo	14	0	2	12	9	43	−34	2	2–3	1–3	1–3	0–3	2–5	1–1	0–3	

Updated to match(es) played on 12 August 2026. Source:
Legend: Blue = home team win; Yellow = draw; Red = away team win.
Rules for classification: 1) Points; 2) Goal difference; 3) Goals for; 4) Fair play points; 5) Drawing of lots.

==== Group C (South) ====
Pos	Team	Pld	W	D	L	GF	GA	GD	Pts	MEL	CIE	CUS	MOQ	CHA	GAR
1	Melgar	10	10	0	0	37	6	+31	30		4–2	5–2	3–0	5–0	6–1
2	Cienciano	10	4	2	4	15	18	−3	14	0–3		1–1	2–1	2–1	1–1
3	Cusco	10	4	1	5	16	19	−3	13	0–1	2–1		3–0	3–2	3–2
4	Deportivo Moquegua	10	4	1	5	10	14	−4	13	1–2	3–1	1–0		0–1	1–0
5	Los Chankas	10	4	1	5	13	19	−6	13	0–4	2–3	2–0	1–1		2–0
6	Deportivo Garcilaso	10	1	1	8	10	25	−15	4	0–4	0–2	4–2	1–2	1–2	

Updated to match(es) played on 12 August 2026. Source:
Legend: Blue = home team win; Yellow = draw; Red = away team win.
Rules for classification: 1) Points; 2) Goal difference; 3) Goals for; 4) Fair play points; 5) Drawing of lots.

=== Second stage ===
==== Group A ====
Pos	Team	Pld	W	D	L	GF	GA	GD	Pts	Qualification	ALI	UCV	UNI	JPA	CAG	CAM
1	Alianza Lima	10	9	0	1	34	6	+28	27	Advance to Semifinals		4–0	2–1	1–0	6–0	6–0
2	Universidad César Vallejo	10	7	1	2	26	17	+9	22	Advance to Semifinals	3–1		2–1	2–2	3–0	4–1
3	Universitario	10	7	0	3	22	8	+14	21		0–1	5–2		5–0	2–1	3–0
4	Juan Pablo II College	10	2	2	6	17	26	−9	8		2–6	1–2	0–1		5–2	3–1
5	Atlético Grau	10	1	1	8	11	33	−22	4		0–3	1–4	0–2	3–3		4–3
6	Carlos A. Mannucci	10	2	0	8	11	29	−18	6		0–4	1–2	0–2	3–1	2–0	

Updated to match(es) played on 17 november 2026. Source:
Legend: Blue = home team win; Yellow = draw; Red = away team win.
Rules for classification: 1) Points; 2) Goal difference; 3) Goals for; 4) Fair play points; 5) Drawing of lots.

==== Group B ====
Pos	Team	Pld	W	D	L	GF	GA	GD	Pts	Qualification	CRI	MEL	CAN	CUS	MOQ	CIE
1	Sporting Cristal	10	10	0	0	46	11	+35	30	Advance to Semifinals		3–1	4–2	9–1	2–0	11–0
2	Melgar	10	6	2	2	26	14	+12	20	Advance to Semifinals	2–3		2–2	3–0	3–1	4–0
3	Academia Cantolao	10	5	1	4	36	16	+20	16		1–4	1–2		7–0	9–0	10–0
4	Cusco	10	3	1	6	11	30	−19	10		1–4	1–3	0–1		2–1	2–1
5	Deportivo Moquegua	10	2	2	6	13	24	−11	8		2–3	2–2	2–0	0–1		3–0
6	Cienciano	10	0	2	8	7	42	−35	2		1–3	1–4	2–3	0–0	2–2	

Updated to match(es) played on 17 november 2026. Source:
Legend: Blue = home team win; Yellow = draw; Red = away team win.
Rules for classification: 1) Points; 2) Goal difference; 3) Goals for; 4) Fair play points; 5) Drawing of lots.

=== Semi-finals ===
==== First leg ====
2026

Universidad César Vallejo	–	Sporting Cristal

2026

Melgar	–	Alianza Lima

==== Second leg ====
2026

Sporting Cristal	–	Universidad César Vallejo

2026

Alianza Lima	–	Melgar

== U-18 tournament ==
=== First stage ===
==== Group A (North) ====
Pos	Team	Pld	W	D	L	GF	GA	GD	Pts	JPA	UCV	CAG	AAS	CAJ	CAM	COM	UTC
1	Juan Pablo II College	14	9	3	2	32	16	+16	30		3–4	1–1	3–2	3–1	1–0	2–0	1–0
2	Universidad César Vallejo	14	8	4	2	27	14	+13	28	1–0		5–1	2–1	3–3	1–1	0–0	2–0
3	Atlético Grau	14	8	3	3	28	24	+4	27	0–4	2–1		2–1	3–1	1–0	3–0	6–1
4	Alianza Atlético	14	6	1	7	36	25	+11	19	3–5	2–1	3–4		2–1	4–0	7–1	8–1
5	Cajamarca	14	5	3	6	26	26	0	18	0–3	1–1	2–3	2–2		2–1	1–0	4–1
6	Carlos A. Mannucci	14	5	1	8	15	18	−3	16	0–2	0–1	4–1	0–1	3–1		1–2	1–0
7	Comerciantes Unidos	14	4	3	7	13	26	−13	15	2–2	0–4	0–0	2–0	1–4	0–1		3–0
8	UTC	14	1	2	11	11	36	−25	5	2–2	0–1	1–1	1–0	–	1–3	1–2	

Updated to match(es) played on 20 August 2026. Source:
Legend: Blue = home team win; Yellow = draw; Red = away team win.
Rules for classification: 1) Points; 2) Goal difference; 3) Goals for; 4) Fair play points; 5) Drawing of lots.

==== Group B (Center) ====
Pos	Team	Pld	W	D	L	GF	GA	GD	Pts	ALI	CRI	UNI	CAN	SHU	SBA	USM	ADT
1	Alianza Lima	14	10	3	1	34	12	+22	33		3–2	2–1	1–1	1–0	1–0	5–1	4–0
2	Sporting Cristal	14	10	1	3	34	13	+21	31	1–1		2–0	1–0	6–0	2–1	3–1	3–0
3	Universitario	14	9	1	4	28	15	+13	28	2–1	0–3		2–0	4–0	1–2	1–1	5–1
4	Academia Cantolao	14	4	4	6	17	21	−4	16	0–3	2–0	0–3		1–1	0–3	5–1	4–1
5	Sport Huancayo	14	4	3	7	18	33	−15	15	3–3	1–3	1–3	1–0		3–2	3–1	3–2
6	Sport Boys	14	3	4	7	19	23	−4	13	1–3	1–2	1–3	2–2	1–0		1–2	1–1
7	Universidad San Martín	14	3	4	7	18	29	−11	13	0–2	1–5	1–2	1–1	4–0	1–1		2–0
8	ADT	14	1	4	9	11	33	−22	7	0–4	2–1	0–1	0–1	2–2	2–2	0–0	

Updated to match(es) played on 20 august 2026. Source:
Legend: Blue = home team win; Yellow = draw; Red = away team win.
Rules for classification: 1) Points; 2) Goal difference; 3) Goals for; 4) Fair play points; 5) Drawing of lots.

==== Group C (South) ====
Pos	Team	Pld	W	D	L	GF	GA	GD	Pts	MEL	MOQ	CUS	CIE	CHA	GAR
1	Melgar	10	7	2	1	37	12	+25	23		3–6	3–1	9–0	4–1	4–0
2	Deportivo Moquegua	10	5	2	3	25	15	+10	17	2–2		1–1	4–0	2–0	2–1
3	Cusco	10	5	2	3	15	11	+4	17	0–1	2–0		3–2	3–0	2–1
4	Cienciano	10	3	2	5	12	30	−18	11	0–6	2–1	1–2		2–1	2–1
5	Los Chankas	10	2	2	6	11	25	−14	8	1–4	1–5	2–1	0–0		2–1
6	Deportivo Garcilaso	10	1	4	5	14	21	−7	7	1–1	3–2	0–0	3–3	3–3	

Updated to match(es) played on 12 August 2026. Source:
Legend: Blue = home team win; Yellow = draw; Red = away team win.
Rules for classification: 1) Points; 2) Goal difference; 3) Goals for; 4) Fair play points; 5) Drawing of lots.

=== Second stage ===
==== Group A ====
Pos	Team	Pld	W	D	L	GF	GA	GD	Pts	Qualification	ALI	UNI	UCV	CAM	JPA	CAG
1	Alianza Lima	10	10	0	0	36	6	+30	30	Advance to Semifinals		2–0	3–0	2–0	6–1	7–1
2	Universitario	10	6	1	3	22	12	+10	19	Advance to Semifinals	0–1		2–0	4–2	5–0	2–1
3	Universidad César Vallejo	10	5	1	4	14	14	0	16		0–3	0–0		2–0	2–0	3–1
4	Carlos A. Mannucci	10	4	0	6	20	25	−5	12		1–3	2–5	2–1		3–1	6–1
5	Juan Pablo II College	10	2	1	7	14	28	−14	7		2–3	2–1	1–3	4–1		1–2
6	Atlético Grau	10	1	1	8	15	36	−21	4		1–6	2–3	2–3	2–3	2–2	

Updated to match(es) played on 17 November 2026. Source:
Legend: Blue = home team win; Yellow = draw; Red = away team win.
Rules for classification: 1) Points; 2) Goal difference; 3) Goals for; 4) Fair play points; 5) Drawing of lots.

==== Group B ====
Pos	Team	Pld	W	D	L	GF	GA	GD	Pts	Qualification	CRI	CAN	MEL	MOQ	CUS	CIE
1	Sporting Cristal	10	8	1	1	29	8	+21	25	Advance to Semifinals		1–1	5–1	3–0	7–0	4–0
2	Academia Cantolao	10	6	2	2	23	10	+13	20	Advance to Semifinals	2–0		2–2	1–0	2–0	7–1
3	Melgar	10	6	1	3	23	20	+3	19		1–2	3–2		2–1	4–1	4–2
4	Deportivo Moquegua	10	2	2	6	13	18	−5	8		1–2	1–4	2–1		4–0	2–2
5	Cusco	10	2	2	6	12	28	−16	8		1–3	2–1	1–2	1–1		3–3
6	Cienciano	10	1	2	7	14	30	−16	5		1–2	0–1	2–3	2–1	1–3	

Updated to match(es) played on 17 november 2026. Source:
Legend: Blue = home team win; Yellow = draw; Red = away team win.
Rules for classification: 1) Points; 2) Goal difference; 3) Goals for; 4) Fair play points; 5) Drawing of lots.

=== Semi-finals ===
==== First leg ====
2026

Universitario	–	Sporting Cristal

2026

Academia Cantolao	–	Alianza Lima

==== Second leg ====
2026

Sporting Cristal	–	Universitario

2026

Alianza Lima	–	Academia Cantolao

== Aggregate tables (U-16 and U-18) ==
=== Group A (North) ===
Pos	Team	Pld	W	D	L	GF	GA	GD	Pts	Qualification
1	Universidad César Vallejo	28	19	5	4	80	28	+52	62	Advance to Second stage
2	Juan Pablo II College	28	17	5	6	66	34	+32	56	Advance to Second stage
3	Carlos A. Mannucci	28	16	2	10	61	37	+24	50	Advance to Second stage
4	Atlético Grau	28	14	4	10	47	54	−7	46	Advance to Second stage
5	Alianza Atlético	28	13	3	12	65	63	+2	42	
6	Cajamarca	28	8	4	16	43	63	−20	28	
7	Comerciantes Unidos	28	6	5	17	22	75	−53	23	
8	UTC	28	4	2	22	27	72	−45	14	

Updated to match(es) played on 20 August 2026. Source:
Rules for classification: 1) Points; 2) Goal difference; 3) Goals for; 4) Fair play points; 5) Drawing of lots.

=== Group B (Center) ===
Pos	Team	Pld	W	D	L	GF	GA	GD	Pts	Qualification
1	Alianza Lima	28	21	5	2	66	24	+42	68	Advance to Second stage
2	Sporting Cristal	28	19	4	5	73	32	+41	61	Advance to Second stage
3	Universitario	28	17	4	7	65	40	+25	55	Advance to Second stage
4	Academia Cantolao	28	9	6	13	38	47	−9	33	Advance to Second stage
5	Universidad San Martín	28	8	8	12	43	52	−9	32	
6	Sport Boys	28	7	6	15	41	55	−14	27	
7	ADT	28	5	6	17	32	59	−27	21	
8	Sport Huancayo	28	4	5	19	27	76	−49	17	

Updated to match(es) played on 20 august 2026. Source:
Rules for classification: 1) Points; 2) Goal difference; 3) Goals for; 4) Fair play points; 5) Drawing of lots.

=== Group C (South) ===
Pos	Team	Pld	W	D	L	GF	GA	GD	Pts	Qualification
1	Melgar	20	17	2	1	74	18	+56	53	Advance to Second stage
2	Deportivo Moquegua	20	9	3	8	35	29	+6	30	Advance to Second stage
3	Cusco	20	9	3	8	31	30	+1	30	Advance to Second stage
4	Cienciano	20	7	4	9	27	48	−21	25	Advance to Second stage
5	Los Chankas	20	6	3	11	24	44	−20	21	
6	Deportivo Garcilaso	20	2	5	13	24	46	−22	11	

Updated to match(es) played on 12 August 2026. Source:
Rules for classification: 1) Points; 2) Goal difference; 3) Goals for; 4) Fair play points; 5) Drawing of lots.

== See also ==
- 2026 Liga 1 (Peru)
- 2026 Liga 2 (Peru)
- Liga Nacional Juvenil FPF
