= 2025 Torneo Juvenil Sub-18 =

Torneo Juvenil Sub-18
- Season: 2025
- Dates: 14 July – 20 December 2025
- Country: Peru
- Teams: 19
- Champions: Sporting Cristal (1st title)
- Promoted: Sporting Cristal
- 2026 U-20 Copa Libertadores: Sporting Cristal
- Top goalscorer: (Peru) José Ryu Yabiku (Melgar, 17 goals)

The 2025 Torneo Juvenil Sub-18 was the 1st edition of the Torneo Juvenil Sub-18, the top division of youth football in Peru. The under-18 teams of 19 Peruvian Primera División clubs participated in the league.

On August 19, 2025, the Peruvian Football Federation officially announced the exclusion of Binacional from Liga 1 and the 2025 Torneo Juvenil Sub-18, following a court ruling that annulled the injunction which had allowed the club to return to the first division after its relegation in 2023. In its statement, the FPF indicated that the Juliaca-based team will no longer be allowed to participate in professional tournaments.

== Teams ==
=== Stadia and locations ===
Locations of the 2025 Torneo Juvenil Sub-18 teams

Team	City	Stadium	Capacity
ADT	Tarma	Unión Tarma	9,100
Alianza Atlético	Sullana	Campeones del 36	12,000
Alianza Lima	Lima	Alejandro Villanueva	35,938
Alianza Universidad	Huánuco	Heraclio Tapia	25,000
Atlético Grau	Piura	Miguel Grau de Piura	25,500
Ayacucho	Ayacucho	Ciudad de Cumaná	12,000
Binacional	Juliaca	Guillermo Briceño Rosamedina	20,080
Cienciano	Cusco	Garcilaso	45,056
Comerciantes Unidos	Cutervo	Juan Maldonado Gamarra	12,000
Cusco	Cusco	Garcilaso	45,056
Deportivo Garcilaso	Cusco	Garcilaso	45,056
Juan Pablo II College	Chongoyape	Complejo Juan Pablo II	3,000
Los Chankas	Andahuaylas	Los Chankas	10,000
Melgar	Arequipa	Virgen de Chapi	40,370
Sport Boys	Callao	Miguel Grau	17,000
Sport Huancayo	Huancayo	Huancayo	20,000
Sporting Cristal	Lima	Alberto Gallardo	11,600
Universitario	Lima	Monumental	80,093
UTC	Cajamarca	Héroes de San Ramón	10,465

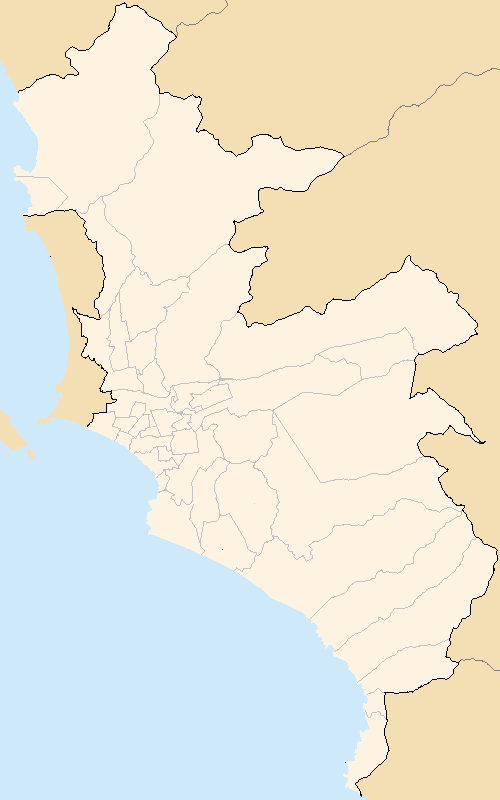
Locations of the 2025 Torneo Juvenil Sub-18 teams – Lima.

== Torneo Apertura ==
=== Group A ===
Pos	Team	Pld	W	D	L	GF	GA	GD	Pts	Qualification	UNI	UTC	CAG	COM	JPA	AAS
1	Universitario	10	8	0	2	25	7	+18	24	Quarterfinals		3–0	2–1	3–1	2–1	6–0
2	UTC	10	4	3	3	13	8	+5	15	Quarterfinals	1–0		1–1	1–0	3–0	6–0
3	Atlético Grau	10	4	3	3	23	21	+2	15	Quarterfinals	1–6	2–0		5–2	3–2	5–2
4	Comerciantes Unidos	10	3	2	5	14	16	−2	11		0–2	1–1	2–1		2–1	5–0
5	Juan Pablo II College	10	2	3	5	13	17	−4	9		2–0	0–0	3–3	1–0		2–2
6	Alianza Atlético	10	2	3	5	9	28	−19	9		0–1	1–0	1–1	1–1	2–1	

Updated to match(es) played on 30 August 2025. Source:
Legend: Blue = home team win; Yellow = draw; Red = away team win.
Rules for classification: 1) Points; 2) Goal difference; 3) Goals for; 4) Fair play points; 5) Drawing of lots.

=== Group B ===
Pos	Team	Pld	W	D	L	GF	GA	GD	Pts	Qualification	ALI	CRI	SHU	SBA	ADT	AUH
1	Alianza Lima	10	9	1	0	34	5	+29	28	Quarterfinals		1–1	5–0	2–1	6–0	4–1
2	Sporting Cristal	10	6	3	1	32	8	+24	21	Quarterfinals	0–4		11–0	1–0	7–0	6–0
3	Sport Huancayo	10	3	3	4	14	29	−15	12		1–3	1–1		2–1	2–1	6–2
4	Sport Boys	10	3	0	7	14	13	+1	9		0–2	1–2	3–0		4–0	2–0
5	ADT	10	2	2	6	10	29	−19	8		0–3	1–3	2–2	1–0		4–1
6	Alianza Universidad	10	1	3	6	9	29	−20	6		1–4	0–0	0–0	3–2	1–1	

Updated to match(es) played on 31 August 2025. Source:
Legend: Blue = home team win; Yellow = draw; Red = away team win.
Rules for classification: 1) Points; 2) Goal difference; 3) Goals for; 4) Fair play points; 5) Drawing of lots.

=== Group C ===
Pos	Team	Pld	W	D	L	GF	GA	GD	Pts	Qualification	MEL	CUS	CIE	CHA	GAR	AYA	BIN
1	Melgar	10	8	1	1	28	7	+21	25	Quarterfinals		4–1		4–0	4–0	5–1	3–0
2	Cusco	10	5	2	3	23	12	+11	17	Quarterfinals	0–1		1–0	7–4	4–0		5–0
3	Cienciano	10	4	4	2	13	8	+5	16	Quarterfinals	0–2	1–0		3–0	1–1	2–1	
4	Los Chankas	10	4	2	4	17	22	−5	14		2–1	1–1	2–2			2–0	2–1
5	Deportivo Garcilaso	10	2	4	4	12	18	−6	10		2–3		0–0	3–1		1–1	3–0
6	Ayacucho	10	1	5	4	9	16	−7	8		1–1	1–1	1–1		1–1		2–1
7	Binacional (D)	10	2	0	8	6	25	−19	6	Excluded from the competition (Note: Binacional were excluded from the competition by the Peruvian Football Federation on 19 August 2025.)		0–3	0–3	0–3	3–1	1–0	

Updated to match(es) played on 3 September 2025. Source:
Legend: Blue = home team win; Yellow = draw; Red = away team win.
Rules for classification: 1) Points; 2) Goal difference; 3) Goals for; 4) Fair play points; 5) Drawing of lots.
(D) Disqualified

=== Bracket ===
Quarterfinals
Melgar	4
Atlético Grau	0
Sporting Cristal	6
Cusco	0
Alianza Lima	7
UTC	0
Universitario	7
Cienciano	1

Semifinals
Melgar	0	2	2
Sporting Cristal	3	0	3
Alianza Lima	0	0	0
Universitario	0	1	1

Finals
Sporting Cristal	4	3	7
Universitario	0	1	1

=== Quarterfinals ===
11 September 2025	Melgar	4–0	Atlético Grau	CAR Melgar, Arequipa
14:00	Ryu Yabiku 51' 64' (pen.); Jesualdo Llerena 69'; Ian Arróspide 77'

11 September 2025	Alianza Lima	7–0	UTC	Complejo EGB, Lima
15:00	Adrian Neciosup 11'; Justo Arroyo; Carlos Alvarado; Donato Reynaldo; Paolo Justo; Jefferson Muñoz

12 September 2025	Universitario	7–1	Cienciano	CampoMar U, Lima
10:0	Junior Díaz 12'; Adrián Cáceres 14' 45'; Hiroshi Mejía; Gonzalo Álvarez; Loayza; Sebastián Osorio		Yván Rojas

13 September 2025	Sporting Cristal	6–0	Cusco	La Florida, Lima
10:30	José María Mellán; Carlos Salgado; Raúl Rojas; Alexandro Fanárraga; Matías Martínez; Jair Moretti

=== Semifinals ===
==== First leg ====
17 September 2025	Universitario	0–0	Alianza Lima	CampoMar U, Lima
10:00

17 September 2025	Sporting Cristal	3–0	Melgar	La Florida, Lima
10:00	Raúl Rojas 35'; Chema Mellan 43'; Yasimir Sifuentes 59'

==== Second leg ====
20 September 2025	Melgar	2–0	Sporting Cristal	CAR Melgar, Arequipa
14:00	Patricio Núñez; Keith Yañez

21 September 2025	Alianza Lima	0–1	Universitario	Completo EGB, Lima
11:00			Gonzalo Álvarez

=== Final ===
24 September 2025	Sporting Cristal	4–0	Universitario	La Florida, Lima
10:00	Jair Moretti 57' (pen.) 77' 81'; Matías Martínez 90'

28 September 2025	Universitario	1–3	Sporting Cristal	CampoMar U, Lima
10:00	Hiroshi Mejía 11'		Jair Moretti 27'; Gerson Castillo 34'; José María Mellán 47'

Sporting Cristal won 7–1 on aggregate.

== Torneo Clausura ==
=== Group A ===
Pos	Team	Pld	W	D	L	GF	GA	GD	Pts	Qualification	CRI	CAG	JPA	UTC	COM	AAS
1	Sporting Cristal	10	8	2	0	35	4	+31	26	Quarterfinals		2–0	2–0	5–0	5–0	10–0
2	Atlético Grau	10	4	3	3	21	15	+6	15	Quarterfinals	1–1		3–1	4–1	5–0	3–1
3	Juan Pablo II College	10	4	3	3	15	13	+2	15	Quarterfinals	3–3	2–2		3–0	0–1	2–1
4	UTC	10	3	1	6	15	25	−10	10		0–4	4–1	0–2		1–1	3–2
5	Comerciantes Unidos	10	3	3	4	7	19	−12	12		0–2	2–1	0–0	1–5		2–0
6	Alianza Atlético	10	1	2	7	8	25	−17	5		0–1	1–1	1–2	2–1	0–0	

Updated to match(es) played on 27 November 2025. Source:
Legend: Blue = home team win; Yellow = draw; Red = away team win.
Rules for classification: 1) Points; 2) Goal difference; 3) Goals for; 4) Fair play points; 5) Drawing of lots.

=== Group B ===
Pos	Team	Pld	W	D	L	GF	GA	GD	Pts	Qualification	ALI	UNI	SBA	SHU	ADT	AUH
1	Alianza Lima	10	6	3	1	31	7	+24	21	Quarterfinals		1–1	1–1	3–0	5–0	8–1
2	Universitario	10	5	3	2	18	12	+6	18	Quarterfinals	1–1		0–0	2–1	4–0	4–2
3	Sport Boys	10	5	3	2	14	11	+3	18	Quarterfinals	1–5	3–2		2–0	3–0	1–0
4	Sport Huancayo	10	5	1	4	15	14	+1	16		1–0	3–0	1–1		3–1	2–1
5	ADT	10	1	2	7	9	26	−17	5		0–2	1–2	1–2	4–3		2–2
6	Alianza Universidad	10	1	2	7	8	25	−17	5		1–5	0–2	1–0	0–1	0–0	

Updated to match(es) played on 27 November 2025. Source:
Legend: Blue = home team win; Yellow = draw; Red = away team win.
Rules for classification: 1) Points; 2) Goal difference; 3) Goals for; 4) Fair play points; 5) Drawing of lots.

=== Group C ===
Pos	Team	Pld	W	D	L	GF	GA	GD	Pts	Qualification	MEL	CUS	CHA	GAR	AYA	CIE
1	Melgar	10	9	0	1	35	8	+27	27	Quarterfinals		3–1	3–0	2–4	6–0	4–1
2	Cusco	10	4	3	3	15	15	0	15	Quarterfinals	0–2		2–2	2–0	1–0	1–3
3	Los Chankas	10	4	2	4	18	23	−5	14		1–4	3–3		3–2	3–1	4–2
4	Deportivo Garcilaso	10	4	1	5	18	15	+3	13		0–2	1–2	4–0		3–1	2–0
5	Ayacucho	10	3	1	6	8	23	−15	10		0–5	1–1	0–2	1–0		2–1
6	Cienciano	10	2	1	7	13	23	−10	7		1–4	0–2	2–0	2–2	1–2	

Updated to match(es) played on 21 November 2025. Source:
Legend: Blue = home team win; Yellow = draw; Red = away team win.
Rules for classification: 1) Points; 2) Goal difference; 3) Goals for; 4) Fair play points; 5) Drawing of lots.

=== Bracket ===
Quarterfinals
Alianza Lima	3
Juan Pablo II College	0
Sport Boys	2 (3)
Melgar	2 (0)
Sporting Cristal	7
Cusco	0
Universitario	2
Atlético Grau	1

Semifinals
Alianza Lima	3	5	8
Sport Boys	2	1	3
Sporting Cristal	2	3	5
Universitario	1	1	2

Finals
Alianza Lima	2	2	4
Sporting Cristal	0	2	2

=== Quarterfinals ===
30 November 2025	Sporting Cristal	7–0	Cusco	La Florida, Lima
10:30

30 November 2025	Universitario	2–1	Atlético Grau	CampoMar U, Lima
10:30

30 November 2025	Alianza Lima	3–0	Juan Pablo II College	Hugo Sotil, Lima
10:30

30 November 2025	Melgar	2–2 (0–3 p)	Sport Boys	CAR Melgar, Arequipa
14:00

=== Semifinals ===
==== First leg ====
3 December 2025	Sport Boys	2–3	Alianza Lima	Campolo Alcalde, Callao
10:00

3 December 2025	Universitario	1–2	Sporting Cristal	CampoMar U, Lima
10:00

==== Second leg ====
6 December 2025	Alianza Lima	5–1	Sport Boys	Complejo EGB, Lima
10:00

6 December 2025	Sporting Cristal	3–1	Universitario	La Florida, Lima
10:00

=== Final ===
10 December 2025	Alianza Lima	2–0	Sporting Cristal	Complejo EGB, Lima
10:00

13 December 2025	Sporting Cristal	2–2	Alianza Lima	La Florida, Lima
9:00

Alianza Lima won 4–2 on aggregate.

== Title Play-off ==
17 December 2025	Alianza Lima	0–0	Sporting Cristal	Complejo EGB, Lima
10:00

20 December 2025	Sporting Cristal	3–0	Alianza Lima	La Florida, Lima
10:00

Sporting Cristal secured the title with a 3–0 aggregate victory.

== Aggregate table ==
Once the Torneo Apertura, Torneo Clausura, and the final match between both winners have concluded, the champion of the season—or, if applicable, the highest-ranked team—will qualify for 2026 Liga 3, except for teams already participating in that league.

Pos	Team	Pld	W	D	L	GF	GA	GD	Pts	Qualification
1	Melgar	20	17	1	2	63	15	+48	52	Ineligible for promotion
2	Alianza Lima	20	15	4	1	65	12	+53	49	Ineligible for promotion
3	Sporting Cristal (C)	20	14	5	1	67	12	+55	47	2026 Liga 3
4	Universitario	20	13	3	4	43	19	+24	42	Ineligible for promotion
5	Cusco	20	9	5	6	38	27	+11	32	
6	Atlético Grau	20	8	6	6	44	36	+8	30	
7	Los Chankas	20	8	4	8	35	45	−10	28	
8	Sport Huancayo	20	8	4	8	29	43	−14	28	Ineligible for promotion
9	Sport Boys	20	8	3	9	28	23	+5	27	Ineligible for promotion
10	UTC	20	7	4	9	28	33	−5	25	
11	Juan Pablo II College	20	6	6	8	28	30	−2	24	
12	Deportivo Garcilaso	20	6	5	9	30	33	−3	23	
13	Cienciano	20	6	5	9	26	31	−5	23	Ineligible for promotion
14	Comerciantes Unidos	20	6	5	9	21	35	−14	23	
15	Ayacucho	20	4	6	10	16	38	−22	18	
16	Alianza Atlético	20	3	5	12	17	53	−36	14	
17	ADT	20	3	4	13	19	55	−36	13	Ineligible for promotion
18	Alianza Universidad	20	2	5	13	17	54	−37	11	
19	Binacional (D)	10	2	0	8	6	25	−19	6	Excluded from the competition

Updated to match(es) played on 27 November 2025. Source:
Rules for classification: 1) Points; 2) Goal difference; 3) Goals for; 4) Fair play points; 5) Drawing of lots.
(C) Champions; (D) Disqualified

== See also ==
- 2025 Liga 1 (Peru)
