= 2026 Club Cienciano season =

Club Cienciano
2026 season
- Manager: Horacio Melgarejo
- Stadium: Estadio Garcilaso
- Liga1: 3rd
- Copa Sudamericana: Group stage

The 2026 season is the 125th season for Club Sportivo Cienciano, in which it participates in Liga 1 Fútbol Profesional and the Copa Sudamericana.

== Transfers ==
=== In ===
Pos.	Player	Transferred to	Fee	Date	Source
DF	(Ecuador) Kevin Becerra	(Ecuador) Libertad		1 January 2026	
MF	(Peru) Gerson Barreto	(Peru) ADT		1 January 2026	
MF	(Peru) Ademar Robles	(Peru) ADT		1 January 2026	
FW	(Peru) Matías Succar	(Peru) Alianza Lima	Loan	1 January 2026	
DF	(Argentina) Marcos Martinich	(Paraguay) Sportivo Ameliano		3 February 2026	

== Competitions ==
=== Liga1 ===
==== Torneo Apertura ====
Pos	Team	Pld	W	D	L	GF	GA	GD	Pts	Qualification
1	Alianza Lima	17	12	4	1	30	8	+22	40	Advance to the Playoffs
2	Los Chankas	17	10	4	3	25	21	+4	34	
3	Cienciano	17	10	3	4	34	22	+12	33	
4	Universitario	17	8	5	4	24	15	+9	29	
5	Melgar	17	8	4	5	29	20	+9	28	

Source: Liga 1, Soccerway
Rules for classification: 1) Points; 2) Goal difference; 3) Goals for; 4) Fair play points; 5) Drawing of lots.

==== Results summary ====
Overall								Home						Away					
Pld	W	D	L	GF	GA	GD	Pts	W	D	L	GF	GA	GD	W	D	L	GF	GA	GD
13	8	2	3	27	16	+11	26	6	1	0	19	6	+13	2	1	3	8	10	−2

Last updated: 2 May 2026.

==== Matches ====
31 January 2026 1	Melgar	2–0	Cienciano

8 February 2026 2	Cienciano	6–1	ADC Juan Pablo II

13 February 2026 3	Universitario	2–1	Cienciano

21 February 2026 4	Cienciano	1–1	Alianza Atlético

27 February 2026 5	Deportivo Garcilaso	2–3	Cienciano

9 March 2026 6	Cienciano	3–1	Sport Boys

15 March 2026 7	Cusco	1–2	Cienciano

20 March 2026 8	Cienciano	3–0	Cajamarca

3 April 2026 9	Cienciano	3–2	ADT

19 April 2026 11	Cienciano	2–1	Moquegua

23 April 2026 10	Los Chankas	1–0	Cienciano

26 April 2026 12	UTC	2–2	Cienciano

2 May 2026 13	Cienciano	1–0	Comerciantes Unidos

=== Copa Sudamericana ===
==== First stage ====
5 March 2026	Cienciano (Peru)	1–1 (5–4 p)	(Peru) Melgar

==== Group stage ====
Pos	Team	Pld	W	D	L	GF	GA	GD	Pts	Qualification
1	(Brazil) Atlético Mineiro	6	3	1	2	8	6	+2	10	Advance to round of 16
2	(Peru) Cienciano	6	2	2	2	5	7	−2	8	Advance to knockout round play-offs
3	(Uruguay) Juventud	6	1	4	1	10	7	+3	7 (Note: Head-to-head points: Juventud 4, Academia Puerto Cabello 1.)	
4	(Venezuela) Academia Puerto Cabello	6	2	1	3	6	9	−3	7	

Source: CONMEBOL
Rules for classification: 1) Points; 2) Head-to-head points; 3) Head-to-head goal difference; 4) Head-to-head goals scored; 5) Goal difference; 6) Goals scored; 7) Red cards; 8) Yellow cards; 9) Drawing of lots.
Notes:

9 April 2026 1	Juventud (Uruguay)	1–1	(Peru) Cienciano	Montevideo
19:00				Stadium: Estadio Centenario

16 April 2026 2	Cienciano (Peru)	2–0	(Venezuela) Puerto Cabello

29 April 2026 3	Cienciano (Peru)	1–0	(Brazil) Atlético Mineiro	Cusco
19:30	Bandiera 31'			Stadium: Estadio Garcilaso; Referee: Yael Falcon Pérez (Argentina)

5 May 2026 4	Puerto Cabello (Venezuela)	v	(Peru) Cienciano	Valencia, Venezuela
20:30 UTC−4				Stadium: Estadio Misael Delgado
