= Lisandro Greppo =

Argentine football manager

Agustín Robles
Personal information
- Full name: Lisandro Luis Greppo
- Date of birth: 8 January 1977 (age 49)
- Place of birth: Argentina

Team information
- Current team: Deportivo Garcilaso (manager)

Managerial career
- Years: Team
- 2015: Cienciano (reserves)
- 2015: Alfonso Ugarte
- 2016–2017: Carlos A. Mannucci (assistant)
- 2021: Cienciano (assistant)
- 2021: Cienciano (interim)
- 2022: Cienciano (reserves)
- 2022–2023: Universitario (assistant)
- 2025: UTC (assistant)
- 2025: Sport Boys (assistant)
- 2026: Deportivo Garcilaso (assistant)
- 2026: Deportivo Garcilaso (interim)
- 2026–: Deportivo Garcilaso

Lisandro Luis Greppo (born 8 January 1977) is an Argentine football manager, currently in charge of Peruvian club Deportivo Garcilaso.

== Career ==
After being in charge of the reserve team of Cienciano, Greppo was appointed manager of Alfonso Ugarte in June 2015. In the following year, he was an assistant of Teddy Cardama at Carlos A. Mannucci, before returning to Cienciano in 2021; an assistant of Gerardo Ameli, he took over the club in two matches in August before the manager's arrival.

Greppo became the manager of Cienciano's reserves again for the 2022 season, before joining the staff of Carlos Compagnucci at Universitario in June of that year, as his assistant. After Compagnucci left, Greppo became the Head of the Youth Department, and left the club himself on 26 February 2025, to become Pablo Bossi's assistant at UTC.

In August 2025, Greppo moved to Sport Boys as an assistant of Juan Carlos Cabanillas. Ahead of the 2026 season, he joined Hernán Lisi's staff at Deportivo Garcilaso, and became an interim manager of the club in March after Lisi was sacked.

Back to his assistant role after the appointment of Sebastián Domínguez, Greppo was again named interim on 24 July 2026, after Domínguez left. On 7 August, after two wins in as many matches, he was confirmed as manager of the club until the end of the year.
