= 2025 FBC Melgar season =

FBC Melgar
2025 season
- Manager: Walter Ribonetto (All Season)
- Stadium: Monumental Virgen de Chapi
- Liga 1: Torneo Apertura: Sixth (6°); Torneo Clausura: Eighth (8°); Aggregate Table: Sixth (6°); Sixth National (6°)
- Copa Libertadores: Second Stage; Third Stage
- Copa Sudamericana: Group Stage: Third (3°) Group G
- Top goalscorer: League: Kenji Cabrera (6); Jhonny Vidales (6); All: Kenji Cabrera (9); Jhonny Vidales (6); Facundo Castro (6)
- Biggest win: 6–1 vs Los Chankas Torneo Clausura Match 10 (21 September 2025, Home); 4–0 vs ADT Torneo Apertura Match 7 (5 April 2025, Home); 3–0 vs UTC Torneo Apertura Match 1 (8 February 2025, Home)
- Biggest defeat: 4–1 vs Universitario Torneo Apertura Match 8 (13 April 2025, Away); 3–0 vs Lanús Copa Sudamericana Match 2 Group G (9 April 2025, Away); 3–0 vs Vasco da Gama Copa Sudamericana Match 6 Group G (27 May 2025, Away); 4–2 vs Cerro Porteño Copa Libertadores Third Stage Second Leg (12 March 2025, Away)
Home colours	Away colours	Third colours

The 2025 FBC Melgar season were the One-Hundred-Eleventh (111.º) of the club from its foundation in 1915, Fifty-Six (56) participations in the top-flight of Peruvian Primera División (of 109 Editions) with denomination Liga 1. In Previous Season the club qualified to the 2025 Copa Libertadores as 3rd Place of the 2024 Liga 1.

Melgar were a of nineteen (19) clubs in the Seventh edition (7.º) Liga 1, the competition most important of the Peruvian football. The club played the Peruvian Primera División. In addition, it participated for the Nineth (9th) Time in its history in the Copa Libertadores de América, the most important club tournament at the continental level and it participated for the Seventh (7th) Time in its history in the Copa Sudamericana the Second continental level.

== Torneo Apertura ==
Pos	Team	Pld	W	D	L	GF	GA	GD	Pts
5	Sporting Cristal	18	10	2	6	31	24	+7	32
6	Melgar	18	8	7	3	28	20	+8	31
7	Sport Huancayo	18	9	3	6	23	21	+2	30

== See also ==
- FBC Melgar
- 2025 Liga 1
