= 2027 FBC Melgar season =

FBC Melgar
2027 season
- Stadium: Estadio Melgar
- Liga 1: Torneo Apertura: Nn (3°); Torneo Clausura: Nn (3°); Aggregate Table: Nn (3°); Nn National (3°)
Home colours	Away colours	Third colours

The 2027 FBC Melgar season will be the One-Hundred-Thirteenth (113.º) of the club from its foundation in 1915, Fifty-Eight (58) participations in the top-flight of Peruvian Primera División (of 111 Editions) with denomination Liga 1. In Previous Season the club qualified as +1th Place of the 2026 Liga 1.

Melgar Will be a of eighteen (18) clubs in the Nineth edition (9.º) Liga 1, the competition most important of the Peruvian football. The club played the Peruvian Primera División.

== Liga 1 ==
=== Torneo Apertura ===
Pos	Team	Pld	W	D	L	GF	GA	GD	Pts
1	To Determinated	0	0	0	0	0	0	0	0
2	Melgar	0	0	0	0	0	0	0	0
3	To Determinated	0	0	0	0	0	0	0	0

== See also ==
- FBC Melgar
- 2027 Liga 1
