= 2026 FBC Melgar season =

FBC Melgar
2026 season
- Manager: Juan Reynoso (Start season)
- Stadium: Monumental Virgen de Chapi
- Liga 1: Torneo Apertura: fifth (5°); Copa de la Liga: Group Stage: Third (3°) Group H Torneo Clausura: To Determinated (N°); Aggregate Table: To Determinated (N°); Nn National (N°)
- Copa Sudamericana: First Stage
- Top goalscorer: League: To Determinated (+1); All: To Determinated (+1); To Determinated (+1)
Home colours	Away colours	Third colours

The 2026 FBC Melgar season were the One-Hundred-Twelfth (112.º) of the club from its foundation in 1915, Fifty-Seven (57) participations in the top-flight of Peruvian Primera División (of 110 Editions) with denomination Liga 1. In Previous Season the club qualified to the 2026 Copa Sudamericana as 6th Place of the 2025 Liga 1.

Melgar were a of eighteen (18) clubs in the Eighth edition (8.º) Liga 1, the competition most important of the Peruvian football. The club played the Peruvian Primera División. In addition, it participated for the Eighth (8th) Time in its history in the Copa Sudamericana, the second most important club tournament at the continental level.

== Torneo Apertura ==
Pos	Team	Pld	W	D	L	GF	GA	GD	Pts
4	Universitario	17	8	5	4	24	15	+9	29
5	Melgar	17	8	4	5	29	20	+9	28
6	Cusco FC	17	8	3	6	21	24	-3	27

== See also ==
- FBC Melgar
- 2026 Liga 1
- 2026 Copa de la Liga
