= Kelvin Sánchez =

Peruvian footballer (born 1999)

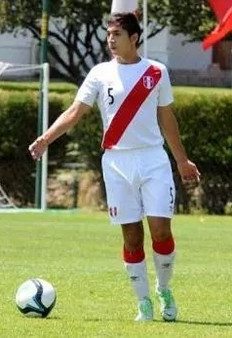
- Sánchez with a Peru youth national team

Personal information
- Full name: Kelvin Denis Sánchez Vasquez
- Date of birth: 3 January 1999 (age 27)
- Place of birth: Trujillo, Peru
- Height: 1.80 m (5 ft 11 in)
- Position: Defensive midfielder

Team information
- Current team: Los Chankas
- Number: 35

Senior career*
Years	Team	Apps	(Gls)
2016–2018	Academia Cantolao	10	(0)
2017	→ Sport Loreto (loan)	17	(0)
2020–2022	Deportivo Llacuabamba	34	(2)
2022–2025	Unión Comercio	90	(4)
2025–	Los Chankas	7	(0)
- * Club domestic league appearances and goals as of 30 December 2025

Kelvin Denis Sánchez Vasquez (born 3 January 1999) is a Peruvian professional footballer who plays as a defensive midfielder for Los Chankas. He has represented the Peru under-17 national team internationally.
