= Walter Paolella =

Argentine football manager

Personal information
- Date of birth: 30 August 1966 (age 60)
- Place of birth: Puerto Madryn, Argentina

Youth career
- Years: Team
- Deportivo Madryn

Managerial career
- Huracán de Chabás (assistant)
- Huracán de Chabás
- 2014–2016: Lobos Prepa
- 2025: Los Chankas (interim)
- 2025–2026: Los Chankas

Walter Paolella (born 30 August 1966) is an Argentine football coach.

== Career ==
Born in Puerto Madryn, Paolella played football and basketball for hometown side Deportivo Madryn as a youth. He had an unsuccessful trial with Argentinos Juniors before retiring to move to Rosario to study.

After graduating in Physical Education, Paolella started a career as a fitness coach at Central Córdoba de Rosario in 1990. He would later work in the same capacity at Gimnasia La Plata and Renato Cesarini, before joining Salvador Capitano's staff at Barcelona SC in 1995, under the same role.

After several years at the club, Paolella returned to Argentina in 1998 after becoming Francisco Ferraro's fitness coach at Colón, before becoming an assistant and later first team manager at Huracán de Chabás. In 2004, he followed José María Bianco to Arsenal de Sarandí, before returning to Ecuador to start a youth academy with Carlos Alfaro Moreno.

Paolella later worked with Jorge Griffa in a football project, before moving to Mexico in 2006 with Pedro Monzón, as a fitness coach at Veracruz. He later became a youth coordinator at the side, before working as a fitness coach at La Piedad and Lobos BUAP; at the latter, he again became a youth coordinator.

In October 2014, after a period away from the club, Paolella returned to Lobos BUAP to become the manager of their reserve team (known as Lobos Prepa). He left in May 2016 to return to Veracruz as a fitness coach under Pablo Marini, but only remained in the role for four months.

On 22 September 2017, Paolella returned to his first club Deportivo Madryn, as a sports coordinator. On 15 April 2024, he left the club to join Pablo Bossi's staff at Peruvian club Los Chankas, returning to a fitness coach role.

Paolella remained a fitness coach at Chankas after the appointment of César Vaioli, but replaced Vaioli as manager on 19 June 2025. Initially an interim, he was definitely appointed as manager of the side on 18 July.

Paolella led Chankas to an impressive 2026 Apertura tournament where they finished second, but was sacked on 12 September of that year, after a poor Clausura and a fifth consecutive defeat.
