= Juan Carlos Malpica =

Peruvian football manager (born 1982)

Personal information
- Full name: Juan Carlos Malpica Velarde
- Date of birth: 25 August 1982
- Place of birth: Peru

Managerial career
- Years: Team
- 2021: Pirata FC II
- 2022: Coronel Bolognesi
- 2022: Real Sociedad Chugay
- 2023: Sport Boys (assistant)
- 2024: Comerciantes Unidos (assistant)
- 2025: Unión Comercio (assistant)
- 2025: Diablos Rojos
- 2025: Credicoop San Román
- 2025: FC Cajamarca
- 2026: Unión Comercio

Juan Carlos Malpica Velarde (born 25 August 1982) is a Peruvian football manager.

== Coaching career ==
In 2022, Malpica managed Coronel Bolognesi before being replaced by Carlos Reyna. After stints as an assistant coach at Sport Boys and then Comerciantes Unidos, he took over as manager of FC Cajamarca in 2025, winning the second division championship. Despite this success, his contract as head of FC Cajamarca has not been renewed.

== Honours ==
FC Cajamarca

- Liga 2 (Peru): 2025
