= Javier Rabanal =

Spanish football manager

Personal information
- Full name: Javier Rabanal Hernández
- Date of birth: 19 April 1979 (age 47)
- Place of birth: San Cristóbal de La Laguna, Spain
- Height: 1.78 m (5 ft 10 in)

Team information
- Current team: Cusco (manager)

Youth career
- Years: Team
- Maspalomas
- Regla

Managerial career
- 1998–1999: Regla (women)
- 1999–2000: Regla (youth)
- 2000–2002: San Gerardo (youth)
- 2002–2003: Laguna (youth)
- 2003–2004: Esperanza (youth)
- 2004–2005: Atlético Pinar (assistant)
- 2005–2007: Candela (assistant)
- 2008–2009: Las Zocas (assistant)
- 2009: Los Llanos de Aridane (assistant)
- 2010–2011: Atlético Victoria (assistant)
- 2011–2012: Atlético Restinga
- 2012–2014: Laguna (youth)
- 2014–2016: Esperanza
- 2018–2020: Willem II U21
- 2018–2019: Willem II U19
- 2022–2023: PSV Eindhoven (assistant)
- 2024: Independiente Juniors
- 2025: Independiente del Valle
- 2026: Universitario
- 2026–: Cusco

Javier Rabanal Hernández (born 19 April 1979) is a Spanish football manager, currently in charge of Peruvian club Cusco.

== Career ==
Born in San Cristóbal de La Laguna, Santa Cruz de Tenerife, Canary Islands, Rabanal played for CD Maspalomas and CF Regla as a youth before switching to managerial roles in 1998, after taking over the latter's women's team. He would later work at local sides San Gerardo CF, CD Laguna de Tenerife, UD Esperanza, Atlético Pinar CF, CD Candela, UD Las Zocas, UD Los Llanos de Aridane and CA Victoria, either as a youth manager or as an assistant.

Rabanal's first managerial experience occurred in 2011, after taking over Atlético Restinga in the Primera Interinsular Tenerife. After avoiding relegation with the side, he returned to Laguna in the following year, after being appointed manager of the Juvenil squad in the División de Honor Juvenil.

In 2014, Rabanal returned to Esperanza, with the club now named CD Zamorano Esperanza, as their first team manager also in the sixth tier. He led the side to a promotion in his first year, and left in 2016 to work in Canada and China, at Futuro Soccer Academy and Leyi Academy, respectively.

In 2018, Rabanal moved to the Netherlands to join Willem II; initially as an under-19 manager, he also managed the reserve team in the Beloften Eredivisie. On 10 February 2022, he agreed to join PSV Eindhoven for the upcoming season, as an assistant of Ruud van Nistelrooy at Jong PSV; Willem II announced the move on 3 March.

On 30 March 2022, however, PSV announced that van Nistelrooy would become the manager of the first team for the 2022–23 season, with Rabanal as his assistant. He left after van Nistelrooy resigned, and moved to Ecuador on 15 January 2024, to take over Independiente del Valle's reserve side Independiente Juniors in the Serie B.

Rabanal led Independiente Juniors to a fourth position in the 2024 Serie B, before being appointed at the helm of the first team on 21 December. Despite winning the 2025 title, the club announced his contract would not be renewed on 13 December of that year.

On 15 December 2025, Rabanal agreed to become the manager of Peruvian club Universitario ahead of the upcoming season. The following 21 April, he left by mutual consent, and took over fellow league team Cusco in June.

== Managerial statistics ==
As of 16 October 2026

Managerial record by team and tenure
Team	Nat.	From	To	Record							
Team	Nat.	From	To	G	W	D	L	GF	GA	GD	Win %
Independiente del Valle	(Ecuador)	21 December 2024	21 December 2025	57	30	17	10	94	52	+42	52.63
Universitario	(Peru)	1 January 2026	21 April 2026	12	5	4	3	13	11	+2	41.67
Cusco	(Peru)	9 June 2026	present	15	6	1	8	25	24	+1	40.00
Career total				84	41	22	21	132	87	+45	48.81

== Honours ==
Independiente del Valle

- LigaPro Serie A: 2025
