= Jhonny Vidales =

Peruvian footballer (born 1992)

Johnny Vidales
Personal information
- Full name: Johnny Víctor Vidales Lature
- Date of birth: 22 April 1992 (age 34)
- Place of birth: Lima, Peru
- Height: 1.78 m (5 ft 10 in)
- Position: Winger

Team information
- Current team: FBC Melgar
- Number: 11

Senior career*
| Years | Team | Apps | (Gls) |
| 2012–2013 | Alianza Lima | 60 | (4) |
| 2014 | Parma | 0 | (0) |
| 2014 | → Gorica (loan) | 0 | (0) |
| 2014–2015 | Marítimo | 10 | (1) |
| 2015 | Sport Huancayo | 13 | (1) |
| 2016 | UCV | 34 | (2) |
| 2017–2018 | Real Garcilaso | 80 | (13) |
| 2019–2022 | FBC Melgar | 100 | (18) |
| 2023 | Cusco | 32 | (1) |
| 2024 | Carlos A. Mannucci | 32 | (2) |
| 2025 | ADT | 16 | (13) |
| 2025– | FBC Melgar | 41 | (36) |

International career^{‡}
| 2012– | Peru | 9 | (0) |
- * Club domestic league appearances and goals as of 19 September 2026 ‡ National team caps and goals as of 14 November 2026

Johnny Víctor Vidales Lature (born 22 April 1992) is a Peruvian professional footballer who plays as a winger for FBC Melgar and the Peru national team.

== Club career ==
Vidales was born in Lima. He was moved to Alianza Lima's first team in January 2012. On matchday 1, he made his league debut in the Torneo Descentralizado playing from start in the 2–2 draw at home against León de Huánuco. He played in the reserves until being called up by manager José Soto for his second league match, which was in matchday 20 in a 0–0 draw away to Unión Comercio. In his ninth game with Alianza, Vidales scored his first league goal on 2 August 2012 in the derby match at home against Sporting Cristal, which finished a 1–1 draw.

On 16 August 2014, Vidales signed a three-year contract with Marítimo.

== International career ==
Vidales received his first call up to play for the Peru national team on 27 September 2012.

== Career statistics ==
=== Club ===
As of match played 19 September 2026.

| Club | Season | League | | | Cup | | Continental | | Total | |
| Club | Season | Division | Apps | Goals | Apps | Goals | Apps | Goals | Apps | Goals |
|---|---|---|---|---|---|---|---|---|---|---|
| Alianza Lima | 2012 | Liga 1 | 23 | 3 | — | | 0 | 0 | 23 | 3 |
| Alianza Lima | 2013 | Liga 1 | 36 | 1 | — | | — | | 36 | 1 |
| Alianza Lima | Total | | 59 | 4 | 0 | 0 | 0 | 0 | 59 | 4 |
| Marítimo | 2014–15 | Primeira Liga | 9 | 0 | 2 | 2 | — | | 11 | 2 |
| Marítimo B | 2014–15 | Liga Portugal 2 | 4 | 0 | — | | — | | 4 | 0 |
| Sport Huancayo | 2015 | Liga 1 | 13 | 1 | — | | — | | 13 | 1 |
| UCV | 2016 | Liga 1 | 34 | 2 | — | | 1 | 0 | 35 | 2 |
| Real Garcilaso | 2017 | Liga 1 | 38 | 3 | — | | — | | 38 | 3 |
| Real Garcilaso | 2018 | Liga 1 | 41 | 10 | — | | 6 | 1 | 47 | 11 |
| FBC Melgar | 2019 | Liga 1 | 27 | 5 | 3 | 1 | 12 | 0 | 42 | 6 |
| FBC Melgar | 2020 | Liga 1 | 26 | 3 | — | | 4 | 0 | 30 | 3 |
| FBC Melgar | 2021 | Liga 1 | 22 | 7 | 1 | 0 | 6 | 1 | 29 | 8 |
| FBC Melgar | 2022 | Liga 1 | 25 | 3 | — | | 8 | 0 | 33 | 3 |
| Cusco | 2023 | Liga 1 | 32 | 1 | — | | — | | 32 | 1 |
| Cusco | Total | | 111 | 14 | 0 | 0 | 6 | 1 | 117 | 15 |
| Carlos A. Mannucci | 2024 | Liga 1 | 32 | 2 | — | | — | | 32 | 2 |
| ADT | 2025 | Liga 1 | 16 | 13 | — | | 1 | 0 | 17 | 13 |
| FBC Melgar | 2025 | Liga 1 | 14 | 6 | — | | — | | 14 | 6 |
| FBC Melgar | 2026 | Liga 1 | 27 | 12 | — | | 1 | 0 | 28 | 12 |
| FBC Melgar | Total | | 41 | 36 | 4 | 1 | 31 | 1 | 76 | 38 |
| Career total | | | 419 | 72 | 6 | 3 | 39 | 2 | 464 | 77 |

=== International ===
As of match played 13 November 2026

Appearances and goals by national team and year
| National team | Year | Apps | Goals |
|---|---|---|---|
| Peru | 2012 | 1 | 0 |
| Peru | 2025 | 1 | 0 |
| Peru | 2026 | 7 | 0 |
| Total | | 9 | 0 |

== Honours ==
Gorica

- Slovenian Football Cup: 2013–14

FBC Melgar

- Torneo Apertura 2022
