= Hernán Lisi =

Argentine footballer and manager

Personal information
- Full name: Hernán Alberto Lisi
- Date of birth: 12 April 1971 (age 55)
- Place of birth: Fighiera, Argentina
- Position: Defender

Youth career
- Newell's Old Boys

Senior career*
Years	Team	Apps	(Gls)
1997–1998	Banfield	8	(0)
1998–1999	Defensa y Justicia	34	(4)
1999–2000	San Martín SJ	24	(1)
2000–2001	Blooming		

Managerial career
- 2007: Banfield (assistant)
- 2007: Banfield (interim)
- 2009–2010: Libertad (assistant)
- 2010: Cerro Porteño (assistant)
- 2011: Unión Comercio
- 2012–2013: Unión Temuco
- 2013: Rubio Ñu
- 2015: Deportivo Pereira
- 2016: Nacional Asunción
- 2016–2017: Once Caldas
- 2017: Rubio Ñu
- 2018: Deportivo Pasto
- 2020: Academia Cantolao
- 2021–2022: Deportivo Municipal
- 2023: Atlas (assistant)
- 2025: UTC
- 2026: Deportivo Garcilaso
- * Club domestic league appearances and goals

Hernán Alberto Lisi (born 12 April 1971) is an Argentine football manager and former player who played as a defender.

== Early life ==
Born in Fighiera, Santa Fe, Lisi was a Newell's Old Boys youth graduate before making his professional debut with Banfield in 1997. He subsequently Defensa y Justicia and San Martín de San Juan in his home country, also having a spell at Bolivian side Blooming before retiring.

== Career ==
Lisi began his managerial career in 2007, while acting as an interim manager of Banfield along with Vitamina Sánchez. He was subsequently Javier Torrente's assistant at Libertad and Cerro Porteño before being named in charge of Peruvian side Unión Comercio in January 2011.

Sacked by Comercio on 12 May 2011, Lisi moved to Chile after being appointed at the helm of Unión Temuco on 12 June 2012. He resigned from the latter in March 2013, and switched teams and countries again on 28 May after taking over Rubio Ñu in Paraguay.

On 26 December 2014, Lisi was appointed manager of Colombian side Deportivo Pereira. He resigned on 9 December of the following year, and moved back to Paraguay on 22 February 2016 after taking over Nacional Asunción.

Lisi returned to Colombia on 1 September 2016, replacing Torrente at Once Caldas. He left on a mutual agreement the following 24 April, and returned to Rubio Ñu on 25 June.

On 7 August 2018, Lisi moved back to Colombia after being named Deportivo Pasto manager, but left on 19 October after only 12 matches. On 14 December 2019, after more than a year without a club, he took over Peruvian side Academia Cantolao.

Lisi was sacked by Cantolao on 27 October 2020, and was appointed in charge of fellow league team Deportivo Municipal on 1 September of the following year.
