= Pablo Bossi =

Uruguayan football manager

Personal information
- Full name: Pablo Emanuel Bossi Bonilla
- Date of birth: 1 January 1973 (age 53)
- Place of birth: Uruguay

Managerial career
- Years: Team
- 2013: Sport Boys
- 2013: Sport Loreto
- 2014: Alfonso Ugarte
- 2016–2017: Carlos A. Mannucci (youth)
- 2017–2020: Universitario (youth)
- 2024: Los Chankas
- 2025: Bentín Tacna Heroica
- 2025: UTC
- 2026: Estudiantil CNI

Pablo Emanuel Bossi Bonilla (born 1 January 1973) is a Uruguayan football manager.

== Career ==
Bossi began his career as a fitness coach of Real Garcilaso in 2010, later working at the Peru national under-17 team in the following year under the same role. In the middle of 2011, he joined Teddy Cardama's staff at Cobresol, also as a fitness coach.

Bossi was later a fitness coach of León de Huánuco in 2012 and Sport Boys in 2013, becoming manager of the latter in August of that year after the departure of Jorge Espejo. After finishing the 2013 Peruvian Segunda División, he took over Sport Loreto in the 2013 Copa Perú, as the club were knocked out in the quarterfinals.

On 13 February 2014, Bossi was named manager of Alfonso Ugarte. He left the club in May, and later worked in the youth sides of Carlos A. Mannucci and Universitario.

On 7 June 2023, Bossi returned to Mannucci after being named head of the scouting department. On 15 April 2024, he was named at the helm of Peruvian Primera División side Los Chankas, but left by mutual consent on 25 September.

Bossi began the 2025 season at Bentín Tacna Heroica, but left the club during the pre-season on 20 February. Five days later, he was presented as manager of UTC also in the Peruvian top tier, but was dismissed on 12 August.
