= Gerardo Ameli =

Argentine football manager

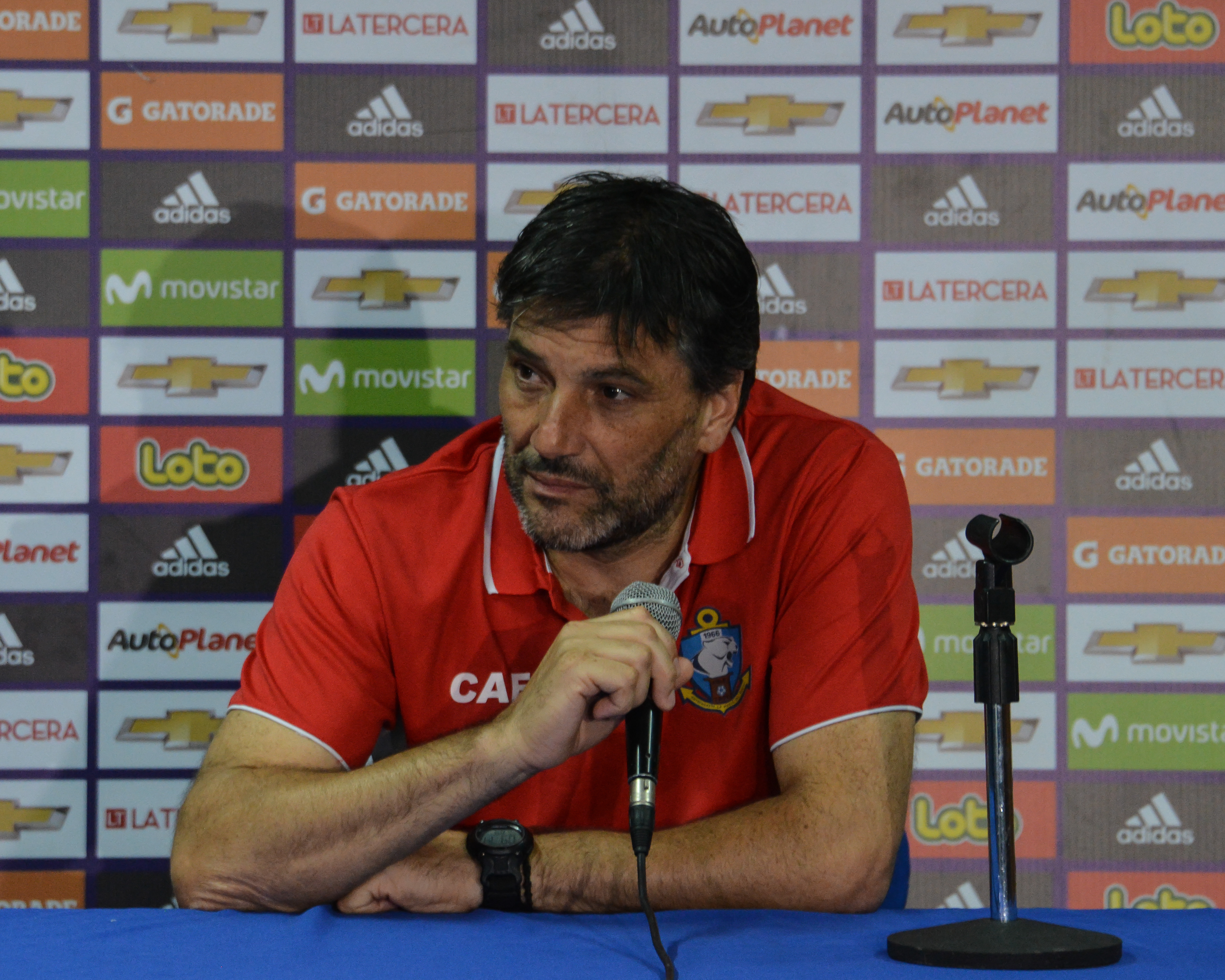
- Ameli with Deportes Antofagasta in 2018

Personal information
- Full name: Gerardo Pablo Ameli
- Date of birth: 18 September 1970 (age 56)
- Place of birth: Rosario, Argentina

Team information
- Current team: Atlético Grau (manager)

Managerial career
- Years: Team
- 2005–2006: Peru U17 (assistant)
- 2006–2007: Sporting Cristal (youth)
- 2007: Peru U20 (assistant)
- 2014: Gimnasia Jujuy (assistant)
- 2015–2016: ADIUR
- 2017: Sport Rosario
- 2017: Deportivo Municipal
- 2018–2019: Deportes Antofagasta
- 2019: UTC
- 2020: Ayacucho
- 2021–2022: Cienciano
- 2023: Unión La Calera
- 2023: Cienciano
- 2024: Deportivo Garcilaso
- 2024–2025: Alianza Atlético
- 2025: Peru (Safap)
- 2026–: Atlético Grau

Gerardo Pablo Ameli (born 18 September 1970) is an Argentine football manager, currently in charge of Peruvian club Atlético Grau.

== Managerial career ==
Having extensive coaching experience, particularly in Peru, Ameli manages numerous teams in that country including Sport Rosario, Deportivo Municipal, UTC, Ayacucho FC, Cienciano, Deportivo Garcilaso and Alianza Atlético. He also had the opportunity to manage Deportes Antofagasta and Unión La Calera in Chile.

In December 2025, he was appointed by the SAFAP (Association of Professional Footballers of Peru) to manage the Peruvian national team in a friendly match against Bolivia on 21 December.

== Personal life ==
Ameli's brother Horacio and son Ignacio were both footballers and defenders. His son was also his assistant at Cienciano and Unión La Calera.
