= Estadio Cristo El Señor =

Football stadium in Cajamarca, Peru

- Location: Cajamarca, Peru
- Owner: Institución Educativa Particular José Sabogal Diéguez
- Capacity: 20,000
- Surface: Grass

Construction
- Opened: 2017

Tenant
- FC Cajamarca

Estadio Cristo El Señor is a football stadium in Cajamarca, Peru. The stadium was inaugurated in 2017 and has a capacity of 20,000. It is the home stadium for FC Cajamarca. The stadium was also used by Comerciantes Unidos during the 2018 Torneo Descentralizado as a secondary venue.
