= Horacio Melgarejo =

Argentine football manager

Personal information
- Full name: Horacio Hernán Melgarejo
- Date of birth: 27 May 1973 (age 53)
- Place of birth: Reconquista, Argentina
- Position: Midfielder

Team information
- Current team: Cienciano (manager)

Senior career*
Years	Team	Apps	(Gls)
- Argentino de Rosario

Managerial career
- 2011–2012: Quintanar Rey (youth)
- 2012–2013: Albacete (youth)
- 2013–2014: Tomelloso
- 2015: Atlético Baleares (assistant)
- 2016: Lleida Esportiu (assistant)
- 2017: Atlético Baleares (assistant)
- 2017–2018: Atlético Baleares
- 2021: Universitario (assistant)
- 2023: Deportivo Municipal (assistant)
- 2023–2025: Atlético Grau (assistant)
- 2025: ADT
- 2026–: Cienciano
- * Club domestic league appearances and goals

Horacio Hernán Melgarejo (born 27 May 1973) is an Argentine football manager and former player who played as a midfielder. He is the current manager of Peruvian club Cienciano.

== Career ==
Melgarejo played for Argentino de Rosario as a senior before establishing himself in Spain. He worked in the youth categories of CD Quintanar del Rey and Albacete Balompié, before being appointed manager of Primera Autonómica Preferente side Tomelloso CF on 8 November 2013.

Melgarejo resigned from Tomelloso on 21 February 2014, and joined CD Atlético Baleares on 24 January of the following year, as Gustavo Siviero's assistant. He followed Siviero to Lleida Esportiu in July 2016, but was dismissed from the club on 7 December.

Back to Atlético Baleares shortly after his dismissal, Melgarejo worked as an assistant before being named manager of the club on 30 November 2017, after the departure of Armando de la Morena. The following 4 February, he was himself dismissed after eight matches.

After spending some time away from coaching duties, Melgarejo joined Universitario in Peru in 2021, as an assistant of Ángel Comizzo. He followed Comizzo to Atlético Grau in 2023, again as his assistant.

On 10 July 2025, Melgarejo was announced as manager of ADT. On 24 November, he was announced in charge of Cienciano for the upcoming season.
