= Estadio Complejo Juan Pablo II =

Football stadium in Chongoyape, Peru

Estadio del Complejo Juan Pablo II
- Location: Chongoyape, Peru
- Owner: Association Club Deportivo Juan Pablo II College
- Operator: Association Club Deportivo Juan Pablo II College
- Capacity: 3,000
- Surface: Grass

Construction
- Opened: March 30, 2025

Tenants
- Association Club Deportivo Juan Pablo II College (2025–present)

Estadio Complejo Juan Pablo II is a football stadium located in the city of Chongoyape, Peru. The stadium is owned and used by Peruvian Primera División club, Juan Pablo II College. It is part of the Complejo Deportiva Juan Pablo II. Opened on March 30, 2025, it has a seating capacity of 3,000.
