= ADC Juan Pablo II College =

Juan Pablo II College
- Full name: Association Club Deportivo Juan Pablo II College
- Nicknames: Auriblancos; JuanPablinos; El Equipo Papal
- Founded: 24 November 2015; 10 years ago
- Stadium: Estadio Complejo Juan Pablo II
- Chairman: Orfelinda Correa
- Manager: Marcelo Zuleta
- League: Liga 1
- 2025: Liga 1, 15th of 19
- Website: https://www.clubjuanpabloll.pe
Home colours	Away colours

The Association Club Deportivo Juan Pablo II College, often referred to as Juan Pablo II College is a Peruvian professional football club, based in the town of Chongoyape. The club was founded in 24 November 2015. The club has been competing in the Peruvian Primera División since 2025.

== History ==
=== Beginnings ===
Being founded in 24 November 2015 on the initiative of the same Educational Institution (I. E. P. Juan Pablo II College), the academy began participating in the second division of the Chongoyape Districtal League, initially with the purpose of having the students of said institution be part of the sports academy, although later the hiring of players and athletes was allowed to achieve sporting excellence in the Copa Perú. The team was initially led by technical director Milton Pérez Cocha.

=== Copa Perú 2022 ===
It would not be until 2022 —the year in which the district competition was resumed— that the team would become relevant. Juan Pablo II College managed to be runner-up in the first division of its district, gaining access to the Provincial Stage of the Copa Perú. The team reached round 4, being eliminated at that stage by Boca Juniors from Chiclayo.

=== Promotion to the Liga 2 ===
The club was the 2023 Liga Departamental de Lambayeque champion for the first time after defeating Juventud La Joya in the final and qualified for the 2023 Copa Perú. Juan Pablo II College achieved promotion to Liga 2 for the first time and passage to the semifinals of the Copa Perú after defeating Diablos Rojos (Juliaca) in the quarter-finals. In the semi-finals of the tournament they were eliminated San Marcos.

In the clubs first season in the Liga 2, they advanced to the Group Stage from the Regional Stage. In the regional stage the club finished first advancing to the semi-finals against Comerciantes. After beating Comerciantes on penalties, Juan Pablo II achieved promotion to the Peruvian Primera División for the first time. However, the match brought a lot of suspicion and controversy to the club, as one of the goals scored by Juan Pablo II College was a meter offside, and Comerciantes player Kevin Lugo failed to score a penalty which led to people thinking that the club bribed the referee and player. It also does not help that the clubs owner, Agustín Lozano, president of the Peruvian Football Federation, has had numerous accusations on corruption and bribery. Comerciantes appealed to the federation to replay the match and for the disqualification of the club but never received a response Since the match, the club has received much hate from around the country and from other clubs. Juan Pablo II College reached the final of the Liga 2 and lost to Alianza Universidad.

== Stadium ==
The home stadium of Juan Pablo II College originally was Estadio Municipal de la Juventud, located in Chongoyape with a capacity of 2,000 people. However, in 2025, the club moved to the Estadio Complejo Juan Pablo II located in the same city, within the Complejo Deportiva Juan Pablo II, which is owned and operated by the club. It was inaugurated on March 30, 2025, and has a capacity of 3,000 seats.

== Honours ==
=== Senior titles ===
Keys

- Record
- ^{(s)} Shared record

Type	Competition	Titles	Runner-up	Winning years	Runner-up years
National (League)	Liga 2	—	1	—	2024
Regional (League)	Liga Departamental de Lambayeque	1	—	2023	—
Regional (League)	Liga Provincial de Chiclayo	—	1	—	2023
Regional (League)	Liga Distrital de Chongoyape	—	1	—	2022

== See also ==
- List of football clubs in Peru
- Peruvian football league system

== Managers ==
- (Peru) Milton Pérez Cocha (2015–2017)
- (Peru) Almiro Ríos Villarreal (2022)
- (Peru) Alejandro Vásquez (2023)
- (Peru) Edwin Zelada (2023)
- (Peru) Daniel Valderrama (2023)
- (Peru) Santiago Acasiete (2024–2025)
