= Club Deportivo Los Chankas =

Peruvian football club

- Full name: Club Deportivo Los Chankas CYC
- Nickname: Guerreros Chankas
- Founded: August 30, 1989; 37 years ago
- Stadium: Estadio Los Chankas
- Chairman: Kevin Iñigo Peralta
- Manager: Walter Paolella
- League: Liga 1
- 2025: Liga 1, 9th of 19
Home colours	Away colours

The Club Deportivo Los Chankas, also known as Los Chankas, is a Peruvian professional football club based in the town of Andahuaylas. Founded in 1989, it owes its name to the ancient Chanka ethnic group. It participated in the Peruvian Segunda División until 2023, when it was promoted to the Primera División, becoming the first team from the department of Apurímac in history to do so.

== History ==
=== Copa Peru ===
Los Chankas was founded on August 30, 1989 under the name Club Deportivo Cultural Santa Rosa, after the Peruvian saint Santa Rosa de Lima. The club would participate in the Liga Distrital de Talavera, the 7th division of the Peruvian football league system. In 1992, the club was runner-up the Liga Departamental del Apurímac, qualifying for the Copa Perú. They would also win the Región IX but was unable to be promoted to the Primera División.

In 2010, Los Chankas won the Liga Provincial de Andahuaylas and was runner-up of the Departamental League, qualifying for the Regional stage of the 2010 Copa Perú but was eliminated by Alianza Unicachi.

In the 2011 Copa Perú, the club qualified to the Regional Stage but was eliminated by Franciscano San Román and José María Arguedas.

In the 2013 Copa Perú, the club qualified to the Regional Stage but was eliminated by Franciscano San Román and Fuerza Minera.

In the 2015 Copa Perú, the club qualified to the National Stage but was eliminated by Sport Ancash in the Round of 16. Despite being eliminated in the Round of 16, the club was invited to the Peruvian Segunda División for the first time.

In the 2015 Segunda División, according to the rules of that year's tournament (played with 12 teams), there was only one relegation, which in theory corresponded to Club San Simó, which finished in 12th place. However, as this club had withdrawn halfway through the championship, the relegation corresponded to the one that finished in 11th place, which was Atlético Minero. And although it was intended to consider a single relegation at the end of the season, the rules had been approved in that way by the Peruvian Football Federation, an entity that in the end rejected the request of the ADFP-SD for a single relegation, relegating the Matucana club.

With this, a promotion spot remained to be defined, and since there were other teams that entered the 2016 season via invitation given based on sporting merits in the 2015 Copa Perú to complete the tournament, inviting Unión Tarapoto and Sport Áncash (and where also the other clubs that had reached the quarter-finals, apart from DIM de Miraflores that had finished 9th, who confirmed their participation for the corresponding instances in Copa Perú 2016), before which the spot was officially given to Club Cultural Santa Rosa, which was the next in order of sporting merit, thus ascending to the Second Division tournament.

=== Second Division ===
In the 2017 season, they managed to improve their participation by finishing in fifth place despite an irregular campaign at the start of the season. In 2018, they failed to improve after finishing in tenth place, despite this they managed to improve their club statistics on goals scored.

In 2019, the Peruvian Second Division tournament would be renamed to Liga 2. At the beginning of the tournament, their participation alongside Sport Rosario and Sport Victoria was unknown, but finally they confirmed their participation and achieved their fourth consecutive participation. The club played in the newly created Copa Bicentenario in 2019, in which they placed last in their group. In Liga 2 in 2020, they finished last but as there was no relegation, they maintained their category.

On August 19, 2021, Cultural Santa Rosa changed its name to Los Chankas - CYC. The letters CYC are the initials of late club president Clodoaldo Yñigo Condori who died as a result of complications from COVID-19 in the midst of the COVID-19 pandemic in Peru. In the 2021 Copa Bicentenario, the club surprised by eliminating giants Alianza Lima in the First Round but were later eliminated by Unión Comercio.

In the 2024 season, Los Chankas placed second and advanced to the Ligiulla play-off semi-finals. They would defeat Comerciantes and advance to the Ligiulla final, in which the winnersr were promoted to the Liga 1. On October 27, 2023, Los Chankas gained promotion to Liga 1 for the first time in their history after defeating Alianza Universidad on penalties. Los Chankas became the first team from the Apurímac region to play in the Liga 1.

== Kit and crest ==
The club's original crest remained in place until early 2016, after being invited to participate in Peru's Second Division in 2021, changing its name, crest, and uniforms to Los Chankas CYC.

The Los Chankas CYC crest is an emblem that honors the rich history and culture of the Andahuaylas region. Its design features the figure of a Chanka warrior, symbolizing the strength and resilience the team seeks to represent on the field.

== Stadium ==
The club plays its home stadium is Estadio Los Chankas, an impressive sports venue located at an altitude of 2,926 meters above sea level in the city of Andahuaylas. This stadium, managed by the Provincial Municipality of Andahuaylas, is a source of pride for the local community, as it has a seating capacity of 10,000 people. Likewise, the stadium is a meeting and celebration point for sports fans in the Apurímac region. In 2024, the club announced the construction of the fourth stand after the club's promotion.

== Rivalries ==
Los Chankas has rivalries with Cienciano and Deportivo Garcilaso, other Peruvian clubs, from Cusco, called the Clásicos del Tahuantinsuyo. The rivalries relates to the Chanka and Inca people who frequently fought against each other in the 15th century. The rivalry developed after Los Chankas's promotion to the Liga 1.

== Current squad ==
As of 24 September 2026

Note: Flags indicate national team as defined under FIFA eligibility rules; some limited exceptions apply. Players may hold more than one non-FIFA nationality.

No.	Pos.	Nation	Player
1	GK	PER	Hairo Camacho
2	DF	ARG	Héctor González
4	MF	PER	Accel Campos
5	MF	PER	Jorge Palomino
6	MF	PAN	Abdiel Ayarza
7	FW	COL	Juan Ospina
10	MF	ARG	Franco Torres
11	FW	COL	Jarlín Quintero
12	GK	PER	Luis Pretel
14	DF	PER	Brayan Guevara
15	MF	PER	Kelvin Sánchez
16	DF	PER	Axel Chávez

No.	Pos.	Nation	Player
17	MF	PER	Christian Velarde
18	FW	PER	Oshiro Takeuchi
20	FW	COL	Marlon Torres
22	MF	PER	Sebastián Zarabia
24	DF	URU	Gonzalo Rizzo
26	DF	PER	David Gonzáles
27	FW	PER	Kenyi Barrios
30	DF	PER	Michael Kaufman
31	DF	PER	Ayrthon Quintana
33	DF	URU	Carlos Pimienta
37	DF	PER	José Cárdenas
77	FW	PER	Félix Espinoza

== Managers ==
- (Argentina) Pablo Garabello (2022)
- (Argentina) Gustavo Cisneros (2022)
- (Peru) Roberto Holsen (2022)
- (Brazil) Daniel Galo (2022)
- (Peru) Abraham Montoya (2022)
- (Peru) Juan Carlos Bazalar (2023)
- (Uruguay) Pablo Bossi (2024)
- (Argentina) Jorge Antonio Vivaldo (2025)
- (Argentina) Cesar Vaioli (2025)
- (Argentina) Walter Paolella (2025–)

== Honours ==
=== Senior titles ===
Keys

- Record
- ^{(s)} Shared record

Type	Competition	Titles	Runner-up	Winning years	Runner-up years
National (League)	Liga 2	—	1	—	2023
Half-year / Short tournament (League)	Torneo Apertura	—	1	—	2026
Regional (League)	Región IX	1	—	1993	—
Regional (League)	Liga Departamental del Apurímac	2	3	2011, 2013	1992, 2010, 2015
Regional (League)	Liga Provincial de Andahuaylas	2	2	2010, 2015	2013, 2014
Regional (League)	Liga Distrital de Talavera	2	—	2013, 2015	—
