= Chongoyape District =

Coordinates: 6.6378°S 79.4059°W

Chongoyape
- District
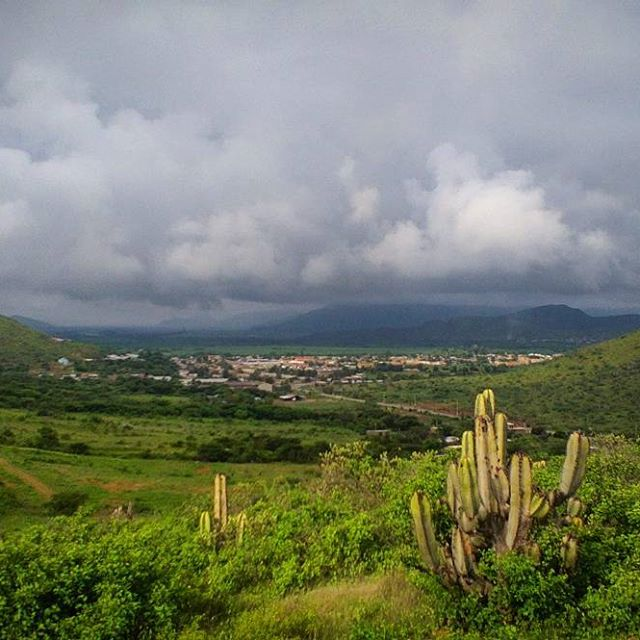
- Interactive map of Chongoyape
- Country: Peru
- Region: Lambayeque
- Province: Chiclayo
- Founded: July 30, 1840
- Capital: Chongoyape

Government
  - Mayor: Agustín Lozano

Area
  - Total: 712 km^{2} (275 sq mi)
- Elevation: 209 m (686 ft)

Population (2013)
  - Total: 25,400
  - Density: 3,567/km^{2} (9,240/sq mi)
- Time zone: UTC-5 (PET)
- UBIGEO: 140102

Chongoyape District is one of twenty districts of the province Chiclayo in Peru, located in the Department of Lambayeque, under the administration of the regional government of Lambayeque, Peru. The Tinajones reservoir and Carhuaquero hydroelectric center are nearby.

== Etymology ==
The toponym Chongoyape has a clear pre-Hispanic origin, associated with the Yunga languages of the northern Peruvian coast, such as Mochica (Muchik). The ending "-ape" or "-pe" is a locative suffix characteristic of the toponymy of this linguistic family, meaning 'place of'. While the exact meaning of most Mochica toponyms has been lost with the extinction of the language, historian and university professor from Lambayeque, Salvador Salazar Sata, has proposed a specific etymology for Chongoyape. According to Salazar Sata, the name would derive from the older Mochica word Chongoyint, meaning 'stars'. Thus, by adding the locative suffix '-ape' (in '-yint'), the full name Chongoyape would mean 'Place of Stars'. This interpretation is based on documented references found in the 'catecismo breve y cotidiano' (brief and daily catechism) included in the colonial priest Jerónimo de Oré's 'Rituale seu Manuale Peruanum' (1607, page 454).

Salazar Sata's proposal is further supported by previous works of the German linguist Ernst Middendorf and applies reconstruction methodologies developed by experts in Andean languages such as Alfredo Torero and Rodolfo Cerrón-Palomino. He does not support a Quechua origin for Chongoyape, arguing that Quechua interpretations are often convoluted, lack direct coherence with the local context, and frequently rely on figurative meanings that don't align with the place's reality. Specifically, he dismisses the popular Quechua etymology of Sunqullaki ('weeping or crying heart') by pointing out that its phonetic construction does not adequately conform to Quechua verbal grammar. In contrast, the Mochica etymology gains greater coherence when considering the night skies, which are particularly starry and visible in this part of Lambayeque. The phonetic evolution from 'Chongoyint' to 'Chongoyape' was likely driven by the adaptation of Mochica sounds to Spanish phonology by new speakers, a process that occurred relatively quickly, as the word 'Chongoyape' is already recorded as such in land inheritance documents from 1702.

The word Chongoyape comes from the Quechua language and means sad or crying heart.

== History ==
The district capital of the district of Chongoyape is the city of Chongoyape, located to the east of the city of Chiclayo. It was founded on June 17, 1825, on land donated by the landowner Pedro José de las Muñecas, with the name of Santa Catalina de Chongoyape, in honor of the donor's wife, Catalina Agüero.

== Economy ==
The citizens of Chongoyape mostly work in agriculture, which highlights the planting of rice and sugar cane as well as corn.

== Ecology ==
=== Wildlife ===
Among the wildlife that can be seen are the White-winged Guan, the spectacled bear, the Puna, the Ocelot, White Tail Deer, eagles of different spices, CaracCara, guanacos, llamas, condors and other endemic species. Around the Private Reserve Chaparri, the following birds, among others, can be seen: Brush-headed Duck, White-winged Guan, Tyrannulet Grey and White, White-tailed Magpie, Baird's Flycatcher, and Tumbes Sparrow.

== Private Reserve Chaparri ==
This reserve, which was created in 2001, is located in the outside region of Chongoyape. Chaparrí Reserve was the first reserve to get support from the Department of Protected Areas of the National Institute of Human Resources (INRENA). Animals like the Pava Albiblanca and spectacled bear, who are endangered, are kept in captivity.

- Flora: 122 varieties of plants (103 genres and 45 botanical families).
- Fauna: 250 varieties of birds.

Also found in the Private Reserve Chaparri:

- 23 species of mammals
- 21 species of reptiles
- 4 species of amphibians
- 5 species of fish.

Thanks to the support of the rural community of Chongoyape and private enterprises this project is being carried out with good results.

== Tourist Attractions ==
Chongoyape is the birthplace of the famous song "La Chongoyapana" composed by professor and poet Arthur Schutt Saco. He was amazed at the beauty of Zoraida Leguía, who was the granddaughter of former Peru president Augusto B. Leguia. Saco wrote the song in 1902.

Hace algún tiempo que te enamoro,
Chongoyapana;
pero mi llanto, ni mis suspiros
tu pecho ablandan.
Como las piedras del racarumi
es dura tu alma

para este pobre que te ha venido
siguiendo, ingrata...
Sé que tus ojos abrasadores
miran con ansias.

al venturoso que te desdeña
y a quien tu amas.
Pero ¡no importa! Yo también tengo

quien me idolatre,
quien por mi pena, por mi suspira
y aun vierte lagrimas...
Tiene ojos verdes, cabellos rubios
y tez de nácar.

Y sus sonrisas son las canciones
de la esperanza.

Con que así mira no me desdeñes,
niña simpática;
porque aburrido tal vez me ahorque
de tu ventana.

Y entonces el vulgo diría al verte,
cuando pasares;
Ahí va la niña de faz de cielo
cuyo amor mata.

=== Gastronomy ===
Chongoyape is also known for their sweetbreads. One of their special sweetbreads is called “Chongoyape”. Also, since Chongoyape belongs to the region of Lambayeque, they are known for a pastry called King Kong, made with the same old methods and provided by the Valera family (heirs of the great Eufemio Valera). Another dish of Chongoyape is known for is shurumbo, a soup made with green banana, cassava, beans and pork. This plate is traditional in Chongoyape.

== Climate ==
Climate data for Tinajones, Chongoyape, elevation 182 m (597 ft), (1991–2020)
Month	Jan	Feb	Mar	Apr	May	Jun	Jul	Aug	Sep	Oct	Nov	Dec	Year
Mean daily maximum °C (°F)	31.4 (88.5)	31.9 (89.4)	32.1 (89.8)	31.4 (88.5)	29.7 (85.5)	27.8 (82.0)	27.1 (80.8)	27.2 (81.0)	28.3 (82.9)	28.8 (83.8)	29.4 (84.9)	30.3 (86.5)	29.6 (85.3)
Mean daily minimum °C (°F)	20.4 (68.7)	21.5 (70.7)	21.4 (70.5)	20.1 (68.2)	18.2 (64.8)	16.7 (62.1)	15.7 (60.3)	15.3 (59.5)	15.6 (60.1)	15.9 (60.6)	17.1 (62.8)	18.5 (65.3)	18.0 (64.5)
Average precipitation mm (inches)	19.4 (0.76)	61.8 (2.43)	77.5 (3.05)	23.2 (0.91)	3.4 (0.13)	0.7 (0.03)	0.3 (0.01)	0.3 (0.01)	0.4 (0.02)	3.2 (0.13)	4.2 (0.17)	5.7 (0.22)	200.1 (7.87)
Source: National Meteorology and Hydrology Service of Peru
