= 2019 FBC Melgar season =

FBC Melgar
2019 season
- Manager: Jorge Pautasso (Start Season until 21 may); Karlo Calcina (Interine 25 may until 8 june); Diego Osella (21 june until 27 October); Marco Valencia (1 november until End Season)
- Stadium: Monumental Virgen de Chapi
- Liga 1: Torneo Apertura: Eleventh (11°); Copa Bicentenario: Second (2°) Group H and Round of 16; Torneo Clausura: Nineth (9°); Aggregate Table: Sixth (6°); Sixth National (6°)
- Copa Libertadores: Second Stage; Third Stage; Group Stage: Third (3°) Group F
- Copa Sudamericana: Second Stage
- Top goalscorer: League: Bernardo Cuesta (27); All: Bernardo Cuesta (31); Jhonny Vidales (6); Alexis Arias (5); Joel Sánchez (4)
- Biggest win: 1–5 vs Academia Cantolao Torneo Apertura Match 17 (22 September 2019, Away); 4–0 vs Sport Victoria Copa Bicentenario Match 3 Group H (22 September 2019, Home)
- Biggest defeat: 6–0 vs Universidad Católica Copa Sudamericana Second Stage First Leg (22 September 2019, Away); 0–4 vs Palmeiras Copa Libertadores Match 3 Group F (22 September 2019, Home)
Home colours	Away colours	Third colours

The 2019 FBC Melgar season were the One-Hundred-Fifth (105.º) of the club from its foundation in 1915, Fifty (50) participations in the top-flight of Peruvian Primera División (of 103 Editions) with denomination Liga 1. In Previous Season the club qualified to the 2019 Copa Libertadores as 3rd Place of the 2018 Torneo Descentralizado.

Melgar were a of eighteen (18) clubs in the First edition (1.º) Liga 1, the competition most important of the Peruvian football. The club played the Peruvian Primera División. In addition, it participated for Sixth (6th) Time in its history in the Copa Libertadores, the most important club tournament at the continental level and it participated for Third (3rd) Time in its history in the Copa Sudamericana.

== Torneo Apertura ==
Pos	Team	Pld	W	D	L	GF	GA	GD	Pts
10	Sport Huancayo	17	6	6	5	22	23	-1	24
11	Melgar	17	6	5	6	26	25	+1	23
12	Universitario	17	6	5	6	25	27	-2	23

== See also ==
- FBC Melgar
- 2019 Liga 1
- 2019 Copa Bicentenario
- 2019 Torneo de Promoción y Reservas
