= 2024 FBC Melgar season =

FBC Melgar
2024 season
- Manager: Pablo de Muner (Start Season until 8 March); Marco Valencia (Interine 9 March until 25 May and Oficial 25 May until End Season)
- Stadium: Monumental Virgen de Chapi
- Liga 1: Torneo Apertura: Third (3°); Copa Bicentenario: Cancelled for Covid-19; Torneo Clausura: Fourth (4°); Aggregate Table: Third (3°); Third National (3°)
- Copa Libertadores: First Stage
- Top goalscorer: League: Bernardo Cuesta (15); All: Bernardo Cuesta (15); Jean Pierre Archimbaud (12); Jefferson Cáceres (8); Cristian Bordacahar (8); Tomás Martínez (7)
- Biggest win: 2–6 vs UTC Torneo Apertura Match 15 (12 May 2024, Away); 5–2 vs Univ. César Vallejo Torneo Clausura Match 2 (20 July 2024, Home)
- Biggest defeat: 3–1 vs Alianza Atlético Torneo Clausura Match 3 (25 July 2024, Away)
Home colours	Away colours	Third colours

The 2024 FBC Melgar season were the One-Hundred-Tenth (110.º) of the club from its foundation in 1915, Fifty-Five (55) participations in the top-flight of Peruvian Primera División (of 108 Editions) with denomination Liga 1. In Previous Season the club qualified to the 2024 Copa Libertadores as 4th Place of the 2023 Liga 1.

Melgar were a of eighteen (18) clubs in the Sixth edition (6.º) Liga 1, the competition most important of the Peruvian football. The club played the Peruvian Primera División. In addition, it participated for the Eighth (8th) Time in its history in the Copa Libertadores de América, the most important club tournament at the continental level.

== Torneo Apertura ==
Pos	Team	Pld	W	D	L	GF	GA	GD	Pts
2	Sporting Cristal	17	13	1	3	44	20	+24	40
3	Melgar	17	12	2	3	36	19	+17	38
4	Alianza Lima	17	11	0	6	32	16	+16	33

== See also ==
- FBC Melgar
- 2024 Liga 1
- 2024 Copa Bicentenario
