= 2019 Liga 1 (Peru) =

Liga 1
- Season: 2019
- Dates: 15 February – 15 December 2019
- Champions: Binacional (1st title)
- Relegated: Unión Comercio; Pirata
- Copa Libertadores: Binacional; Alianza Lima; Sporting Cristal; Universitario
- Copa Sudamericana: Sport Huancayo; Melgar; Real Garcilaso
- Matches: 310
- Goals: 802 (2.59 per match)
- Top goalscorer: Bernardo Cuesta (27 goals)
- Biggest home win: Binacional 7–0 Alianza Universidad (18 October)
- Biggest away win: Cantolao 0–4 Binacional (23 February); Universitario 0–4 U. César Vallejo (5 May); Cantolao 1–5 Melgar (8 June)
- Highest scoring: Mannucci 4–4 Ayacucho (16 February)

The 2019 Liga 1 de Fútbol Profesional (known as the 2019 Liga 1 Movistar for sponsorship reasons) was the 103rd season of the highest division of Peruvian football. A total of 18 teams competed in the season, with Sporting Cristal coming in as defending champions.

Binacional were the champions, winning their first league title by defeating Alianza Lima in the finals by a 4–3 aggregate score.

== Competition format ==
The season will be divided into three stages: Torneo Apertura, Torneo Clausura, and the Playoffs.

The first and second stages will be two smaller Apertura and Clausura tournaments of 17 games each. Each team will play the other teams once during the Apertura tournament and once during the Clausura tournament in reversed order for a total of 34 matches. Points earned during the Apertura will not carry over during the Clausura. The winners of the Apertura and Clausura stages will qualify to the playoffs along with the top two teams of the aggregate table, as long as they end in the top nine of this table at the end of the season.

The playoffs to decide the national champion will be contested by four teams, which will play two semifinals with the winners playing the final. In every stage of the playoffs, the teams with the most points on the aggregate table will choose which leg they play as the home team. If the teams are tied in points after the two legs of the final, a third match on neutral ground will be played to decide the national champion. If a team wins both the Apertura and Clausura, the playoffs will not be played and that team will be declared as champion.

Qualification to international competitions will be as follows: the top four teams of the aggregate table will qualify for the 2020 Copa Libertadores, while the next three best teams in that table will qualify for the 2020 Copa Sudamericana, with a fourth berth being allocated to the 2019 Copa Bicentenario winners. In case the Copa Bicentenario winners have already qualified for an international competition, the eighth best team in the aggregate table will also qualify for the Copa Sudamericana. The two teams with the fewest points in the aggregate table at the end of the season will be relegated.

== Teams ==
A total of 18 teams have been confirmed to play in the 2019 Liga 1, an increase of two teams from the previous season. The top fourteen teams in the 2018 Torneo Descentralizado will take part, along with Segunda División champions Universidad César Vallejo, Copa Perú champions Pirata, and the top two teams of the promotion play-offs (Carlos A. Mannucci and Alianza Universidad). The four promoted teams will replace Sport Rosario and Comerciantes Unidos, who were relegated to the Segunda División at the end of the previous season.

=== Team changes ===
Promoted from 2018 Segunda División	Promoted from 2018 Copa Perú	Promoted from Promotion play-offs	Relegated from 2018 Primera División
▲ Universidad César Vallejo (1st)	▲ Pirata (1st)	▲ Carlos A. Mannucci (1st) ▲ Alianza Universidad (2nd)	▼ Sport Rosario (15th) ▼ Comerciantes Unidos (16th)

=== Stadia and locations ===
Locations of the 2019 Liga 1 teams

Team	Manager	City	Stadium	Capacity
Academia Cantolao	(Peru) Jorge Araujo	Callao	Miguel Grau	15,000
Alianza Lima	(Uruguay) Pablo Bengoechea	Lima	Alejandro Villanueva	35,000
Alianza Universidad	(Peru) Rony Revollar	Huánuco	Heraclio Tapia	15,000
Ayacucho	(Uruguay) Mario Viera	Ayacucho	Ciudad de Cumaná	15,000
Binacional	(Peru) Roberto Mosquera	Juliaca	Guillermo Briceño Rosamedina	20,030
Carlos A. Mannucci	(Uruguay) Pablo Peirano	Trujillo	Mansiche	25,000
Deportivo Municipal	(Peru) Víctor Rivera	Huacho	Segundo Aranda Torres	8,000
Melgar	(Peru) Marco Valencia	Arequipa	Virgen de Chapi	60,000
Pirata	(Peru) Carlos Cortijo	Olmos	Francisco Mendoza Pizarro	5,000
Real Garcilaso	(Peru) Javier Arce	Cusco	Garcilaso	42,056
Sport Boys	(Argentina) Marcelo Vivas	Callao	Miguel Grau	17,000
Sport Huancayo	(Argentina) Carlos Ramacciotti	Huancayo	Estadio Huancayo	20,000
Sporting Cristal	(Peru) Manuel Barreto	Lima	Alberto Gallardo	18,000
Unión Comercio	(Colombia) Walter Aristizábal	Nueva Cajamarca	IPD de Moyobamba	12,000
Universidad César Vallejo	(Peru) José del Solar	Trujillo	Mansiche	25,000
Universidad San Martín	(Argentina) Carlos Bustos	Lima	Alberto Gallardo	18,000
Universitario	(Argentina) Ángel Comizzo	Lima	Monumental	80,093
UTC	(Argentina) Gerardo Ameli	Cajamarca	Héroes de San Ramón	6,300

=== Managerial changes ===
Team	Outgoing manager	Manner of departure	Date of vacancy	Position in table	Incoming manager	Date of appointment
Torneo Apertura
Real Garcilaso	(Peru) Víctor Reyes	End of contract	25 November 2018	Pre-season	(Chile) Héctor Tapia	17 December 2018
Binacional	(Peru) Mario Flores	End of contract	25 November 2018	Pre-season	(Peru) Javier Arce	19 January 2019
Pirata	(Peru) Juan Carlos Bazalar	End of contract	2 December 2018	Pre-season	(Peru) Pablo Zegarra	21 December 2018
Melgar	(Colombia) Hernán Torres	Mutual consent	11 December 2018	Pre-season	(Argentina) Jorge Pautasso	26 December 2018
Alianza Lima	(Uruguay) Pablo Bengoechea	End of contract	16 December 2018	Pre-season	(Argentina) Miguel Ángel Russo	28 December 2018
Sporting Cristal	(Chile) Mario Salas	Signed by Colo-Colo	18 December 2018	Pre-season	(Colombia) Alexis Mendoza	7 January 2019
Sporting Cristal	(Colombia) Alexis Mendoza	Mutual consent	5 February 2019	Pre-season	(Argentina) Claudio Vivas	8 February 2019
Sport Boys	(Peru) Jesús Álvarez	Sacked	10 March 2019	18th	(Argentina) Manuel Fernández	10 March 2019
Real Garcilaso	(Chile) Héctor Tapia	Mutual consent	22 March 2019	5th	(Peru) Juan Reynoso	26 March 2019
Sport Huancayo	(Argentina) Marcelo Grioni	Sacked	26 March 2019	17th	(Peru) Cristian Arrasada (caretaker)	26 March 2019
Sport Huancayo	(Peru) Cristian Arrasada	End of caretaker spell	31 March 2019	17th	(Argentina) Carlos Ramacciotti	31 March 2019
Alianza Lima	(Argentina) Miguel Ángel Russo	Resigned	26 April 2019	11th	(Peru) Víctor Reyes (caretaker)	27 April 2019
Pirata	(Peru) Pablo Zegarra	Mutual consent	29 April 2019	17th	(Peru) Carlos Fernández (caretaker)	29 April 2019
Unión Comercio	(Argentina) Marcelo Vivas	Mutual consent	5 May 2019	15th	(Peru) Ítalo Manso (caretaker)	5 May 2019
Carlos A. Mannucci	(Peru) José Soto	Mutual consent	13 May 2019	14th	(Peru) Salomón Paredes (caretaker)	13 May 2019
Melgar	(Argentina) Jorge Pautasso	Resigned	21 May 2019	13th	(Peru) Karlo Calcina (caretaker)	21 May 2019
Universitario	(Chile) Nicolás Córdova	Mutual consent	27 May 2019	13th	(Peru) Juan Pajuelo (caretaker)	27 May 2019
Alianza Lima	(Peru) Víctor Reyes	End of caretaker spell	31 May 2019	5th	(Uruguay) Pablo Bengoechea	26 May 2019
Carlos A. Mannucci	(Peru) Salomón Paredes	End of caretaker spell	2 June 2019	14th	(Uruguay) Pablo Peirano	2 June 2019
Torneo Clausura
Universitario	(Peru) Juan Pajuelo	End of caretaker spell	7 June 2019	Pre-tournament	(Argentina) Ángel Comizzo	6 June 2019
Melgar	(Peru) Karlo Calcina	End of caretaker spell	8 June 2019	Pre-tournament	(Argentina) Diego Osella	14 June 2019
Pirata	(Peru) Carlos Fernández	End of caretaker spell	11 June 2019	Pre-tournament	(Chile) Miguel Ángel Arrué	19 June 2019
Sport Boys	(Argentina) Manuel Fernández	Resigned	3 July 2019	Pre-tournament	(Argentina) Marcelo Vivas	9 July 2019
Unión Comercio	(Peru) Ítalo Manso	End of caretaker spell	12 August 2019	15th	(Colombia) Walter Aristizábal	13 August 2019
Real Garcilaso	(Peru) Juan Reynoso	Signed by Puebla	20 August 2019	15th	(Peru) Ariel Paz (caretaker)	20 August 2019
Binacional	(Peru) Javier Arce	Resigned	3 September 2019	9th	(Peru) Javier Uturunco (caretaker)	4 September 2019
Sporting Cristal	(Argentina) Claudio Vivas	Mutual consent	10 September 2019	6th	(Peru) Manuel Barreto	12 September 2019
Real Garcilaso	(Peru) Ariel Paz	End of caretaker spell	12 September 2019	17th	(Peru) Javier Arce	12 September 2019
Pirata	(Chile) Miguel Ángel Arrué	Sacked	12 September 2019	16th	(Peru) Carlos Cortijo	12 September 2019
Binacional	(Peru) Javier Uturunco	End of caretaker spell	17 September 2019	11th	(Peru) Roberto Mosquera	17 September 2019
UTC	(Peru) Franco Navarro	Sacked	23 September 2019	18th	(Argentina) Gerardo Ameli	26 September 2019
Melgar	(Argentina) Diego Osella	Sacked	27 October 2019	8th	(Peru) Marco Valencia	28 October 2019

== Torneo Apertura ==
=== Standings ===
Pos	Team	Pld	W	D	L	GF	GA	GD	Pts	Qualification
1	Binacional	17	12	0	5	44	23	+21	36	Advance to Playoffs and qualification for Copa Libertadores
2	Sporting Cristal	17	9	5	3	28	13	+15	32	
3	Universidad César Vallejo	17	9	2	6	25	21	+4	29	
4	Deportivo Municipal (Note: Deportivo Municipal and Pirata were deducted one point as punishment for failing to pay debts.)	17	7	7	3	27	20	+7	27	
5	Alianza Lima	17	7	5	5	30	24	+6	26	
6	Real Garcilaso	17	7	5	5	19	15	+4	26	
7	Ayacucho	17	7	4	6	26	23	+3	25	
8	UTC	17	6	7	4	26	24	+2	25	
9	Academia Cantolao	17	6	7	4	18	17	+1	25	
10	Sport Huancayo	17	6	6	5	22	23	−1	24	
11	Melgar	17	6	5	6	26	25	+1	23	
12	Universitario	17	6	5	6	25	27	−2	23	
13	Alianza Universidad	17	5	7	5	18	18	0	22	
14	Carlos A. Mannucci	17	4	4	9	22	27	−5	16	
15	Unión Comercio	17	3	6	8	15	21	−6	15	
16	Universidad San Martín	17	3	6	8	13	32	−19	15	
17	Pirata	17	3	5	9	17	29	−12	13	
18	Sport Boys	17	2	4	11	9	28	−19	10	

Source: ADFP, Soccerway
Rules for classification: 1) Points; 2) Goal difference; 3) Goals for; 4) Fair play points; 5) Drawing of lots; 6) Play-off (only if needed to decide first place).
If two teams are tied in points for first place: 2) Play-off.

=== Results ===
Home \ Away	ALI	AUH	AYA	BIN	CAM	CAN	MUN	MEL	PIR	RGA	SBA	SHU	CRI	UCO	UCV	USM	UNI	UTC
Alianza Lima				2–1			2–2	3–2			3–0			1–1	3–1	1–0	2–3	2–2
Alianza Universidad	2–1		1–0	2–3	3–0	0–0			0–0	2–1			1–1	2–2				
Ayacucho	2–0			3–2		0–0		1–1					2–0			5–0	2–0	0–2
Binacional							3–0	3–1			2–0	1–3		3–1	1–0	6–0	4–2	4–1
Carlos A. Mannucci	2–2		4–4	4–3		1–2		0–1	3–2	0–1			2–0					
Academia Cantolao	1–2			0–4			3–0	1–5					0–0	1–1		3–1	1–0	0–0
Deportivo Municipal		0–0	2–1		1–1				5–0	1–1	3–1	2–2		1–0	1–0			
Melgar		2–0					0–3				1–1	2–2			1–2	3–1	2–1	1–1
Pirata	2–2		3–1	1–2		0–1		2–0		2–1			0–0			0–0		
Real Garcilaso	2–1		3–0	0–1		2–2		1–0					1–1			2–1	0–0	
Sport Boys		1–2	0–1		3–2	0–0			2–1	0–0		0–1	0–3	0–1				
Sport Huancayo	0–3	2–0	2–2		2–1	0–3			1–0	0–1			0–2	3–1				
Sporting Cristal	1–0			3–1			2–0	2–3						1–0	4–1	4–0	1–1	3–1
Unión Comercio			0–1		0–2			1–1	2–0	0–1						0–0	1–1	4–0
Universidad César Vallejo		1–0	3–1		1–0	1–0			2–2	1–0	1–0	2–2		3–0				
Universidad San Martín		1–1			1–0		0–0				1–1	2–1			2–1		2–3	1–1
Universitario		1–1			1–0		2–4		3–1		4–0	1–1			0–4			2–1
UTC		2–1			0–0		2–2		4–1	3–2	2–0	0–0			4–1			

Source: ADFP, Soccerway
Legend: Blue = home team win; Yellow = draw; Red = away team win.

== Torneo Clausura ==
=== Standings ===
Pos	Team	Pld	W	D	L	GF	GA	GD	Pts	Qualification
1	Alianza Lima	17	10	5	2	32	23	+9	35	Advance to Playoffs and qualification for Copa Libertadores
2	Universitario	17	9	6	2	16	10	+6	33	
3	Sporting Cristal	17	9	4	4	31	20	+11	31	
4	Binacional	17	7	7	3	30	13	+17	28	
5	Carlos A. Mannucci	17	7	7	3	20	19	+1	28	
6	Sport Boys	17	7	6	4	23	21	+2	27	
7	Universidad San Martín	17	6	8	3	21	15	+6	26	
8	Sport Huancayo	17	7	5	5	24	21	+3	26	
9	Melgar	17	7	3	7	29	22	+7	24	
10	Ayacucho	17	6	4	7	17	21	−4	22	
11	Real Garcilaso	17	6	3	8	19	16	+3	21	
12	Unión Comercio	17	5	4	8	21	27	−6	19	
13	Alianza Universidad	17	5	4	8	17	26	−9	19	
14	Universidad César Vallejo	17	4	6	7	15	19	−4	18	
15	Academia Cantolao	17	4	5	8	23	30	−7	17	
16	UTC	17	2	8	7	12	22	−10	14	
17	Pirata (Note: Pirata were deducted four points as punishment for failing to pay debts.)	17	3	4	10	12	30	−18	9	
18	Deportivo Municipal (Note: Deportivo Municipal were deducted five points as punishment for failing to pay debts.)	17	3	4	10	20	27	−7	8	

Source: ADFP, Soccerway
Rules for classification: 1) Points; 2) Goal difference; 3) Goals for; 4) Fair play points; 5) Drawing of lots; 6) Play-off (only if needed to decide first place).
If two teams are tied in points for first place: 2) Play-off.

=== Results ===
Home \ Away	ALI	AUH	AYA	BIN	CAM	CAN	MUN	MEL	PIR	RGA	SBA	SHU	CRI	UCO	UCV	USM	UNI	UTC
Alianza Lima		1–1	2–0		2–2	3–2			3–2	1–0		3–1	2–1					
Alianza Universidad							2–1	2–1			2–0	2–4			0–1	1–1	0–1	2–1
Ayacucho		3–2			1–0		2–0		2–1	1–1	0–1	1–1		1–1	1–0			
Binacional	0–0	7–0	2–1		4–0	1–1			2–0	2–2			4–1					
Carlos A. Mannucci		0–0					2–2				1–1	3–3		2–1	2–2	1–0	1–0	2–1
Academia Cantolao		2–1	1–2		0–1				3–0	1–2	1–2	0–2			1–0			
Deportivo Municipal	2–2			1–1		1–3		1–0					0–1			1–2	3–0	0–0
Melgar	2–3		3–0	1–0	0–1	4–2			3–0	2–1			2–3	1–1				
Pirata		0–0			0–0		0–3				1–1	2–1		0–2	0–2		0–1	3–1
Real Garcilaso		0–1			1–0		1–0		0–1		4–0	0–1		4–0	2–0			0–0
Sport Boys	1–2			2–1			2–1	4–2							1–1	0–0	0–0	4–0
Sport Huancayo				0–0			4–2	1–1			0–1				2–0	0–0	0–1	2–1
Sporting Cristal		2–1	1–0		1–2	1–1			4–0	3–0	4–2	3–0						
Unión Comercio	2–3	1–0		0–2		5–2	2–1				1–1	1–2	2–1		0–0			
Universidad César Vallejo	3–1			1–1			3–1	0–3					2–3			0–1	0–0	0–0
Universidad San Martín	2–3		0–0	1–3		3–1		1–1	2–2	2–1			1–1	3–0 (Note: Match awarded 3–0 to Universidad San Martín due to Unión Comercio submitting counterfeited evidence of the presence of a physician in the match. The original result was a 2–1 win for Unión Comercio.)				
Universitario	1–0		3–2	2–0		1–1		2–1		1–0			0–0	2–1		0–0		
UTC	1–1		2–0	0–0		1–1		0–2					1–1	2–1		0–2	1–1	

Source: ADFP, Soccerway
Legend: Blue = home team win; Yellow = draw; Red = away team win.

== Aggregate table ==
Both stages (Torneo Apertura and Torneo Clausura) of the 2019 season were aggregated into a single league table throughout the season to determine two of the teams that will qualify for the playoffs and the Copa Libertadores and three Copa Sudamericana qualifiers, as well as those to be relegated at the end of the season.

Pos	Team	Pld	W	D	L	GF	GA	GD	Pts	Qualification
1	Sporting Cristal (Note: Sporting Cristal were awarded 2 points for winning the 2019 Torneo de Promoción y Reserva.)	34	18	9	7	59	33	+26	65	Qualification for Playoffs and Copa Libertadores second stage
2	Binacional (C)	34	19	7	8	74	36	+38	64	Qualification for Playoffs and Copa Libertadores group stage
3	Alianza Lima	34	17	10	7	62	47	+15	61	Qualification for Playoffs and Copa Libertadores group stage
4	Universitario	34	15	11	8	41	37	+4	56	Qualification for Copa Libertadores first stage
5	Sport Huancayo (Note: Sport Huancayo were awarded 1 point for ending as Torneo de Promoción y Reserva runners-up.)	34	13	11	10	46	44	+2	51	Qualification for Copa Sudamericana first stage
6	Melgar	34	13	8	13	55	47	+8	47	Qualification for Copa Sudamericana first stage
7	Real Garcilaso	34	13	8	13	38	31	+7	47	Qualification for Copa Sudamericana first stage
8	Universidad César Vallejo	34	13	8	13	40	40	0	47	
9	Ayacucho	34	13	8	13	43	44	−1	47	
10	Carlos A. Mannucci	34	11	11	12	42	46	−4	44	
11	Academia Cantolao	34	10	11	13	41	47	−6	41	
12	Alianza Universidad	34	10	11	13	35	44	−9	41	
13	Universidad San Martín	34	9	14	11	34	47	−13	41	
14	UTC	34	8	15	11	38	46	−8	39	
15	Sport Boys	34	9	10	15	32	49	−17	37	
16	Deportivo Municipal (Note: Deportivo Municipal were deducted six points as punishment for failing to pay debts.)	34	10	11	13	47	47	0	35	
17	Unión Comercio (R)	34	8	10	16	36	48	−12	34	Relegation to 2020 Liga 2
18	Pirata (Note: Pirata were deducted five points as punishment for failing to pay debts.) (R)	34	6	9	19	29	59	−30	22	Relegation to 2020 Liga 2

Source: ADFP
Rules for classification: 1) Points; 2) Goal difference; 3) Goals for; 4) Drawing of lots; 5) Play-off (only if needed to decide teams for relegation).
If two teams are tied in points for penultimate place: 2) Play-off.
(C) Champions; (R) Relegated

== Playoffs ==
Semi-finals				Finals
				Binacional	4	0	4
				Alianza Lima	1	2	3
Sporting Cristal	0	1	1	Alianza Lima	1	2	3
Alianza Lima	1	1	2

=== Semi-final ===
==== First leg ====
1 December 2019
15:30
First leg

Alianza Lima	1–0	Sporting Cristal
Fuentes 90+3'	Report

Estadio Alejandro Villanueva, Lima
Referee: Diego Haro

==== Second leg ====
4 December 2019
20:00
Second leg

Sporting Cristal	1–1	Alianza Lima
Beltrán 61' (o.g.)	Report	Ramírez 14'

Estadio Nacional, Lima
Referee: Miguel Santiváñez

Alianza Lima won 2–1 on aggregate and advanced to the Finals.

=== Finals ===
It is the first Liga 1 final to incorporate the use of the video assistant referee (VAR) review system.

==== First leg ====
8 December 2019
15:00
First leg

Binacional	4–1	Alianza Lima
Ojeda 42'; Aubert 51'; Rodríguez 54'; Millán 89' (pen.)		Rodríguez 22'

Estadio Guillermo Briceño Rosamedina, Juliaca
Referee: Michael Espinoza

==== Second leg ====
15 December 2019
15:30
Second leg

Alianza Lima	2–0	Binacional
Ramírez 34'; Fajardo 77' (o.g.)

Estadio Alejandro Villanueva, Lima
Referee: Patricio Loustau (Argentina)

Binacional won 4–3 on aggregate.

== Top goalscorers ==
Rank	Name	Club	Goals
1	(Argentina) Bernardo Cuesta	Melgar	27
2	(Colombia) Donald Millán	Binacional	23
3	(Peru) Kevin Quevedo	Alianza Lima	17
4	(Peru) Mauricio Montes	Ayacucho	15
4	(Uruguay) Santiago Silva	Universidad César Vallejo	15
6	(Uruguay) Sebastián Gularte	Unión Comercio	14
6	(Paraguay) Carlos Neumann	Sport Huancayo	14
8	(Uruguay) Cristian Palacios	Sporting Cristal	13
9	(Ecuador) Joffre Escobar	Universidad San Martín	12
10	(Peru) Aldair Rodríguez	Binacional	11

Source: ADFP

== Liga 1 awards ==
On 10 January 2020, the Liga 1 announced the nominees for the 2019 Liga 1 awards. The award ceremony was held on 16 January 2020, 19:00 PET (UTC−5), at the Teatro Municipal de Lima. The winners were chosen based on voting by coaches and captains of Liga 1 teams as well as by 60 journalists. Votes from Liga 1 fans on social media were also considered.

Award	Winners	Club	Nominees	Club
Best player of the year	(Colombia) Donald Millán	Binacional	(Peru) Kevin Quevedo	Alianza Lima
Best player of the year	(Colombia) Donald Millán	Binacional	(Peru) Christofer Gonzales	Sporting Cristal
Best goalkeeper (shared)	(Peru) Manuel Heredia	Carlos A. Mannucci	(Peru) Jonathan Medina	Sport Boys
Best goalkeeper (shared)	(Peru) José Carvallo	Universitario	(Peru) Jonathan Medina	Sport Boys
Newcomer Player	(Peru) Martín Távara	Sporting Cristal	(Peru) Andy Polar	Binacional
Newcomer Player	(Peru) Martín Távara	Sporting Cristal	(Peru) Aldair Fuentes	Alianza Lima
Best Coach	(Uruguay) Pablo Bengoechea	Alianza Lima	(Peru) Roberto Mosquera	Binacional
Best Coach	(Uruguay) Pablo Bengoechea	Alianza Lima	(Peru) Javier Arce	Binacional
Goal of the Year	(Peru) Juan Pablo Vergara (against UCV, Torneo Apertura)	Binacional	(Peru) Kevin Quevedo (against Academia Cantolao, Torneo Clausura)	Alianza Lima
Goal of the Year	(Peru) Juan Pablo Vergara (against UCV, Torneo Apertura)	Binacional	(Colombia) Mario Ramírez (against Real Garcilaso, Torneo Clausura)	Pirata

The following awards were also awarded:

- Top goalscorer: (Argentina) Bernardo Cuesta from Melgar (27 goals).
- Fair Play award: Sport Huancayo.
- Best supporters: Alianza Lima fans (244,242 home attendance during the season).

=== Best XI ===
The best XI team of the 2019 Liga 1 season was also announced during the award ceremony.

Goalkeeper	Defenders	Midfielders	Forwards
(Peru) José Carvallo (Universitario)	(Peru) Carlos Cabello (Academia Cantolao) (Peru) Gianfranco Chávez (Sporting Cristal) (Argentina) Omar Merlo (Sporting Cristal) (Peru) Jeickson Reyes (Binacional)	(Colombia) Donald Millán (Binacional) (Peru) Aldair Fuentes (Alianza Lima) (Peru) Yorkman Tello (Binacional) (Peru) Alejandro Hohberg (Universitario)	(Peru) Kevin Quevedo (Alianza Lima) (Argentina) Bernardo Cuesta (Melgar)

== See also ==
- 2019 Copa Bicentenario
- 2019 Torneo de Promoción y Reserva
- 2019 Liga 2
- 2019 Cuadrangular de Ascenso
- 2019 Copa Perú
- 2019 in Peruvian football
