= 2023 FBC Melgar season =

FBC Melgar
2023 season
- Manager: Pablo Lavallen (Start Season until 5 March); Marco Valencia (Interine 5 March until 14 March); Mariano Soso (14 March until End Season)
- Stadium: Monumental Virgen de Chapi
- Liga 1: Torneo Apertura: Nineth (9°); Copa Bicentenario: Cancelled for Covid-19; Torneo Clausura: Second (2°); Aggregate Table: Fourth (4°); Fourth National (4°)
- Copa Libertadores: Group Stage: Fourth (4°) Group H
- Top goalscorer: League: Bernardo Cuesta (17); All: Bernardo Cuesta (20); Tomás Martínez (9); Cristian Bordacahar (7); Luis Iberico (6); Pablo Lavandeira (6)
- Biggest win: 5–0 vs Patronato Copa Libertadores Match 5 Group H (6 June 2023, Home); 5–0 vs Academia Cantolao Torneo Apertura Match 14 (29 April 2023, Home); 4–0 vs ADT Torneo Clausura Match 1 (22 June 2023, Home); 4–0 vs Alianza Atlético Torneo Clausura Match 13 (15 September 2023, Home)
- Biggest defeat: 4–1 vs Patronato Copa Libertadores Match 3 Group H (4 May 2023, Away); 4–1 vs Olimpia Copa Libertadores Match 6 Group H (27 June 2023, Away); 3–0 vs Atlético Grau Torneo Apertura Match 3 (WO) (4 February 2023, Away)
Home colours	Away colours	Third colours

The 2023 FBC Melgar season were the One-Hundred-Nineth (109.º) of the club from its foundation in 1915, Fifty-Four (54) participations in the top-flight of Peruvian Primera División (of 107 Editions) with denomination Liga 1. In Previous Season the club qualified to the 2023 Copa Libertadores as Runner-up Place of the 2022 Liga 1.

Melgar were a of nineteen (19) clubs in the Fifth edition (5.º) Liga 1, the competition most important of the Peruvian football. The club played the Peruvian Primera División. In addition, it participated for the Seventh (7th) Time in its history in the Copa Libertadores de América, the most important club tournament at the continental level.

== Torneo Apertura ==
Pos	Team	Pld	W	D	L	GF	GA	GD	Pts
8	Deportivo Garcilaso	18	6	7	5	32	27	+7	25
9	Melgar	18	6	7	5	24	22	+2	25
10	Deportivo Municipal	18	7	3	8	19	21	-2	24

== See also ==
- FBC Melgar
- 2023 Liga 1
