= 2022 FBC Melgar season =

FBC Melgar
2022 season
- Manager: Néstor Lorenzo (Start Season until 3 July); Pablo Lavallen (4 July until End Season)
- Stadium: Monumental Virgen de Chapi
- Liga 1: Torneo Apertura: First (1°) Champion; Copa Bicentenario: Suspended for Covid-19; Torneo Clausura: Fifth (5°); Aggregate Table: Third (3°); Play-offs: Runner-up National (2°)
- Copa Sudamericana: First Stage; Group Stage: First (1°) Group B Round of 16; Quarter Finals; Semifinals
- Top goalscorer: League: Bernardo Cuesta (14); All: Bernardo Cuesta (22); Luis Iberico (15); Martín Pérez Guedes (9); Jean Pierre Archimbaud (6)
- Biggest win: 6–2 vs Deportivo Municipal Torneo Clausura Match 11 (11 September 2022, Home)
- Biggest defeat: 3–0 vs Sport Huancayo Torneo Apertura Match 3 (19 February 2022, Away); 3–0 vs Independiente del Valle Copa Sudamericana Semifinals First Leg (31 August 2022, Away); 0–3 vs Independiente del Valle Copa Sudamericana Semifinals Second Leg (7 September 2022, Home)
Home colours	Away colours	Third colours

The 2022 FBC Melgar season were the One-Hundred-Eighth (108.º) of the club from its foundation in 1915, Fifty-Three (53) participations in the top-flight of Peruvian Primera División (of 106 Editions) with denomination Liga 1. In Previous Season the club qualified to the 2022 Copa Sudamericana as 5th Place of the 2021 Liga 1.

Melgar were a of nineteen (19) clubs in the Fourth edition (4.º) Liga 1, the competition most important of the Peruvian football. The club played the Peruvian Primera División. In addition, it participated for the Sixth (6th) Time in its history in the Copa Sudamericana, the second most important club tournament at the continental level.

== Torneo Apertura ==
Pos	Team	Pld	W	D	L	GF	GA	GD	Pts
1	Melgar	18	13	2	3	23	11	+12	41
2	Sport Huancayo	18	12	4	2	35	18	+17	40
3	Sporting Cristal	18	11	5	2	35	20	+15	38

== See also ==
- FBC Melgar
- 2022 Liga 1
- 2022 Torneo de Promoción y Reservas
