= 2020 FBC Melgar season =

FBC Melgar
2020 season
- Manager: Carlos Bustos (Start Season until 23 September); Marco Valencia (Interine 23 september until End Season)
- Stadium: Monumental Virgen de Chapi; Stadiums of Lima and Callao for Covid-19
- Liga 1: Fase 1: Eighth (8°); Copa Bicentenario: Suspended for COVID-19; Fase 2: Fifth (5°) Liguilla B Aggregate Table: Eighth (8°); Eighth National (8°)
- Copa Sudamericana: First Stage; Second Stage
- Top goalscorer: League: Othoniel Arce (13); All: Othoniel Arce (14); Joel Sánchez (7); Irven Ávila (5); Joel Amoroso (4)
- Biggest win: 0–6 vs Deportivo Llacuabamba Fase 2 Match 7 Liguilla B (21 November 2020, Away Lima); 4–0 vs Sport Huancayo Fase 2 Match 8 Liguilla B (18 November 2020, Home Lima)
- Biggest defeat: 4–0 vs Bahía Copa Sudamericana Second Stage Second Leg (5 November 2020, Away); 0–4 vs Alianza Lima Fase 2 Match 3 Liguilla B (2 November 2020, Home Lima)
Home colours	Away colours	Third colours

The 2020 FBC Melgar season were the One-Hundred-Sixth (106.º) of the club from its foundation in 1915, Fifty-One (51) participations in the top-flight of Peruvian Primera División (of 104 Editions) with denomination Liga 1. In Previous Season the club qualified to the 2020 Copa Sudamericana as 6th Place of the 2019 Liga 1.

Melgar were a of twenty (20) clubs in the Second edition (2.º) Liga 1, the competition most important of the Peruvian football. The club played the Peruvian Primera División. In addition, it participated for Fourth (4th) Time in its history in the Copa Sudamericana, the second most important club tournament at the continental level.

== Fase 1 ==
Pos	Team	Pld	W	D	L	GF	GA	GD	Pts
7	Alianza Universidad	19	8	5	6	21	17	+4	29
8	Melgar	19	7	7	5	23	20	+3	28
9	Ayacucho FC	19	7	6	6	28	21	+7	27

== See also ==
- FBC Melgar
- 2020 Liga 1
- Copa Bicentenario
