= 2019 Sporting Cristal season =

Football league season

Sporting Cristal
2019 season
- President: Federico Cúneo
- Stadium: Alberto Gallardo, Lima
- Liga 1: Torneo Apertura: Second (2°); Torneo Clausura: Third (3°); Aggregate Table: First (1°) Champions; Third National (3°)
- Copa Bicentenario: Quarters Final
- Copa Libertadores: Group stage
- Copa Sudamericana: Second stage (Transferred from Third Place Copa Libertadores)
Home colours	Away colours	Third colours

The 2019 Sporting Cristal season were the Sixty-Fourth (64.º) of the club from its foundation in 1955, Sixty-Four (64) participations consecutives in the top-flight of Peruvian Primera División (of 103 Editions) with denomination last Liga 1. In Previous Season the club qualified as Champions National 8th Place of the 2018 Torneo Descentralizado.

Sporting Cristal were a of eighteen (18) clubs in the First edition (1.º) Liga 1, the competition most important of the Peruvian football. The club played the Peruvian Primera División, Copa Sudamericana for Second (2nd) Time and Copa Libertadores for Thirty-Fourth (34th) Time.

== Liga 1 ==
=== Torneo Apertura ===
Pos	Team	Pld	W	D	L	GF	GA	GD	Pts
1	Deportivo Binacional	17	12	0	5	44	23	+21	36
2	Sporting Cristal	17	9	5	3	28	13	+15	32
3	Univ. César Vallejo	17	9	2	6	25	21	+4	29

== See also ==
- Club Sporting Cristal
- 2019 Liga 1
- 2019 Copa Bicentenario
- 2019 Torneo de Promoción y Reservas
