= Archimbaud =

Archimbaud is a French surname. Notable people with the surname include:

- Aline Archimbaud (born 1948), French politician
- Jean Pierre Archimbaud (born 1994), Peruvian footballer
- Louis Archimbaud (1705–1789), French composer
