= Gularte =

Gularte is a surname. Notable people with the surname include:

- Emanuel Gularte (born 1997), Uruguayan footballer
- Martha Gularte (1919–2002), Uruguayan dancer, poet and vedette
- Rodrigo Gularte (1972–2015), Brazilian citizen
- Sebastián Gularte (born 1990), Uruguayan footballer
