= Osella (disambiguation) =

Osella is an Italian racing car manufacturer and former Formula One team.

Osella may also refer to:

- Golden Osella (Osella d'Oro), the name of several awards given at the Venice Film Festival

== People with the surname ==
- Diego Osella (disambiguation)
- Enzo Osella (1939–2025), the founder and chairman of Italian automanufacturer Osella
- Raúl Osella (born 1984), Argentinian football player
