= 2016 FBC Melgar season =

FBC Melgar
2016 season
- Manager: Juan Reynoso (All Season)
- Stadium: Monumental Virgen de Chapi
- Torneo Descentralizado: Torneo Apertura: Fifth (5°); Torneo Clausura: Third (3°); Liguilla A: Second (2°) (Liguilla Odd); Aggregate Table: Second (2°); Play-offs: Runner-up National
- Copa Libertadores: Group stage Fourth (4°), Group 5
- Top goalscorer: League: Bernardo Cuesta (21); All: Bernardo Cuesta (22); Omar Fernández (10); Patricio Arce (7)
- Biggest win: 5–2 vs Universitario Torneo Clausura Match 20 (29 June 2016, Home)
- Biggest defeat: 4–0 vs Atlético Mineiro Copa Libertadores Match 6 Group 5 (13 April 2016, Away)
Home colours	Away colours	Third colours

The 2016 FBC Melgar season were the One-Hundred-Second (102.º) of the club from its foundation in 1915, Forty-Seven (47) participations in the top-flight of Peruvian Primera División (of 100 Editions) with denomination Torneo Descentralizado. In Previous Season the club qualified as 1st Place agregated of the 2014 Torneo Descentralizado.

Melgar were a of sixteen (16) clubs in the Fifty-First edition (51.º) Torneo Descentralizado, the competition most important of the Peruvian football. The club played the Peruvian Primera División and the Copa Libertadores for Third (3rd) Time.

== Torneo Apertura ==
Pos	Team	Pld	W	D	L	GF	GA	GD	Pts
4	Deportivo Municipal	15	7	4	4	19	18	+1	25
5	Melgar	15	7	3	5	24	18	+6	24
6	Alianza Atlético	15	7	2	6	24	21	+3	23

=== Results ===
Home \ Away	AAS	ALI	AYA	COM	MUN	JA	BOC	MEL	RGA	CRI	SHU	UCO	UCV	USM	UTC	UNI
Alianza Atlético								1–0								
Alianza Lima																
Ayacucho								0–3								
Comerciantes Unidos								2–0								
Deportivo Municipal								1–0								
Juan Aurich																
Defensor La Bocana																
Melgar		1–0			1–1	2–3	2–2		3–1	1–2		2–1				
Real Garcilaso																
Sporting Cristal																
Sport Huancayo								0–0								
Unión Comercio																
Universidad César Vallejo								1–2								
Universidad San Martín								2–1								
UTC								1–3								
Universitario								1–3								

Updated to match(es) played on May 6, 2016. Source: ADFP - official fixture
Legend: Blue = home team win; Yellow = draw; Red = away team win.

== Torneo Clausura ==
Pos	Team	Pld	W	D	L	GF	GA	GD	Pts	Qualification
2	Universitario	30	15	6	9	51	39	+12	51	
3	Melgar	30	13	7	10	48	38	+10	46	Advance to Liguilla A
4	Sport Huancayo	30	12	10	8	36	26	+10	46	

=== Results ===
Home \ Away	AAS	ALI	AYA	COM	MUN	JA	BOC	MEL	RGA	CRI	SHU	UCO	UCV	USM	UTC	UNI
Alianza Atlético																
Alianza Lima								2–1								
Ayacucho																
Comerciantes Unidos																
Deportivo Municipal																
Juan Aurich								1–1								
Defensor La Bocana								2–2								
Melgar	2–0		2–0	3–2							1–2		1–1	1–0	1–1	5–2
Real Garcilaso								1–2								
Sporting Cristal								2–1								
Sport Huancayo																
Unión Comercio								3–1								
Universidad César Vallejo																
Universidad San Martín																
UTC																
Universitario																

Updated to match(es) played on 14 August 2016. Source: ADFP - official fixture
Legend: Blue = home team win; Yellow = draw; Red = away team win.

== Liguilla A ==
Pos	Team	Pld	W	D	L	GF	GA	GD	Pts
1	Sporting Cristal	44	21	12	11	70	48	+22	77
2	Melgar	44	21	11	12	68	48	+20	74
3	Deportivo Municipal	44	19	12	13	54	52	+2	69

=== Results ===
Home \ Away	MUN	JA	BOC	MEL	RGA	CRI	UCO	UCV
Deportivo Municipal				0–0				
Juan Aurich				1–1				
Defensor La Bocana				1–3				
Melgar	2–1	1–2	1–0		0–0	2–0	1–0	1–0
Real Garcilaso				1–2				
Sporting Cristal				3–2				
Unión Comercio				0–0				
Universidad César Vallejo				2–3				

Updated to match(es) played on unknown. Source: ADFP - official fixture
Legend: Blue = home team win; Yellow = draw; Red = away team win.

== Play-offs ==
=== Semifinales ===
November 30, 2016 First Leg	Universitario	1–2	Melgar	Nacional, Lima
20:00	John Galliquio 9'		58' José Carlos Fernández; 86' Bernardo Cuesta	Attendance: 27,438; Referee: Henry Gambetta

December 4, 2016 Second Leg	Melgar	2–2	Universitario	Virgen de Chapi, Arequipa
13:00	Omar Fernández 67'; Alexis Arias 77'		14' Diego Manicero; 33' Andy Polo	Attendance: 28,917; Referee: Diego Haro

=== Final ===
Sporting Cristal won the cup after defeating FBC Melgar.

December 11, 2016 First Leg	Melgar	1–1	Sporting Cristal	Virgen de Chapi, Arequipa
	Bernardo Cuesta 57'		64' Diego Ifrán	Attendance: 30,176; Referee: Víctor Hugo Carrillo

December 18, 2016 Second Leg	Sporting Cristal	0–0	Melgar	Nacional, Lima
15:30				Attendance: 32,002; Referee: Henry Gambetta

== Group stage ==
Pos	Team	Pld	W	D	L	GF	GA	GD	Pts
1	Atlético Mineiro	6	4	1	1	12	4	+8	13
2	Independiente del Valle	6	3	2	1	7	4	+3	11
3	Colo-Colo	6	2	3	1	4	5	−1	9
4	Melgar	6	0	0	6	2	12	−10	0

=== Results Group 5 ===
17 February 2016	Melgar (Peru)	1–2	(Brazil) Atlético Mineiro	Estadio Monumental de la UNSA, Arequipa
18:45 UTC−5	O. Fernández 14'	Report	Rafael Carioca 20'; Patric 38'	Attendance: 30,000; Referee: Wilson Lamouroux (Colombia)

24 February 2016	Colo-Colo (Chile)	1–0	(Peru) Melgar	Estadio Monumental David Arellano, Santiago
19:30 UTC−3	Paredes 64'	Report		Attendance: 30,000; Referee: Julio Quintana (Paraguay)

1 March 2016	Melgar (Peru)	0–1	(Ecuador) Independiente del Valle	Estadio Monumental de la UNSA, Arequipa
15:15 UTC−5		Report	Sornoza 36'	Attendance: 15,000; Referee: Óscar Rojas (Uruguay)

15 March 2016	Independiente del Valle (Ecuador)	2–0	(Peru) Melgar	Estadio Rumiñahui, Sangolquí
17:30 UTC−5	Sornoza 2'; Jo. Angulo 46'	Report		Attendance: 4,000; Referee: Raúl Orosco (Bolivia)

7 April 2016	Melgar (Peru)	1–2	(Chile) Colo-Colo	Estadio Monumental de la UNSA, Arequipa
19:45 UTC−5	Cuesta 48'	Report	Paredes 68', 72'	Attendance: 8,000; Referee: Luis Sánchez (Colombia)

14 April 2016	Atlético Mineiro (Brazil)	4–0	(Peru) Melgar	Estádio Mineirão, Belo Horizonte
19:30 UTC−3	Tiago 1'; Robinho 7'; Pratto 16' (pen.); Carlos 68'	Report		Attendance: 36,031; Referee: Jesús Valenzuela (Venezuela)

== See also ==
- FBC Melgar
- 2016 Torneo Descentralizado
- 2016 Torneo de Promoción y Reservas
