= 2024 Liga 1 (Peru) =

Liga 1 Te Apuesto
- Season: 2024
- Dates: 26 January – 3 November 2024
- Champions: Universitario (28th title)
- Relegated: Carlos A. Mannucci; Universidad César Vallejo; Unión Comercio
- Copa Libertadores: Universitario; Sporting Cristal; Melgar; Alianza Lima
- Copa Sudamericana: Cusco; Cienciano; Atlético Grau; ADT
- Matches: 306
- Goals: 813 (2.66 per match)
- Top goalscorer: Martín Cauteruccio (35 goals)
- Biggest home win: Cienciano 7–0 Unión Comercio (31 October)
- Biggest away win: Unión Comercio 0–12 Sporting Cristal (27 October)
- Highest scoring: Unión Comercio 0–12 Sporting Cristal (27 October)

The 2024 Liga 1 de Fútbol Profesional (known as the Liga 1 Te Apuesto 2024 for sponsorship reasons) was the 108th season of the Peruvian Primera División, the highest division of Peruvian football. A total of 18 teams competed in the season, which began on 26 January and ended on 3 November 2024. The fixture for the season was drawn on 8 January 2024.

The defending champions Universitario claimed their twenty-eighth league championship at the end of the season, winning both the Apertura and Clausura tournaments and thus avoiding to play the final stage of the season (playoffs). They clinched the title with a scoreless draw with Los Chankas and a 2–1 defeat for Alianza Lima against Cusco on the final matchday of the Clausura tournament on 3 November.

== Teams ==
18 teams took part in the league in this season, one less than the previous season: the top 16 teams from the 2023 tournament, plus the 2023 Liga 2 champions Comerciantes Unidos and runner-up Los Chankas. Los Chankas got promoted for the first time in their history and Comerciantes Unidos appeared for the first time since 2018. The promoted teams replaced Academia Cantolao, Binacional and Deportivo Municipal, who were relegated at the end of the previous season.

=== Team changes ===
Promoted from 2023 Liga 2	Relegated from 2023 Liga 1
▲ Comerciantes Unidos (1st) ▲ Los Chankas (2nd)	▼ Binacional (17th) ▼ Deportivo Municipal (18th) ▼ Academia Cantolao (19th)

=== Stadia and locations ===
Locations of the 2024 Liga 1 teams
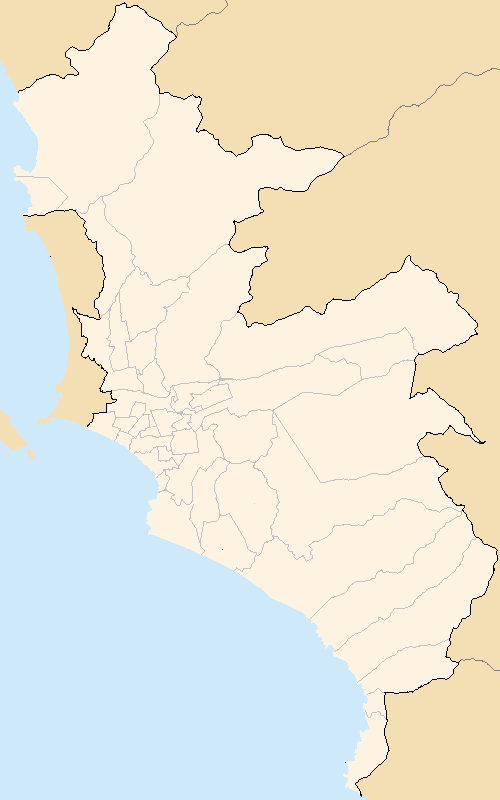
Locations of the 2024 Liga 1 teams – Lima.
Locations of the 2024 Liga 1 teams – Callao.

Team	City	Stadium	Capacity
ADT	Tarma	Unión Tarma	9,100
Alianza Atlético	Sullana	Campeones del 36	12,000
Alianza Lima	Lima	Alejandro Villanueva (Note: Since Estadio Alejandro Villanueva was sanctioned with a 7-month closure for domestic matches due to the incidents at the end of the second leg of the 2023 Liga 1 finals, Alianza Lima played their Torneo Apertura home matches at Estadio Nacional in Lima, with Estadio Iván Elías Moreno in Lima registered as an alternate stadium in the event that Estadio Nacional was unavailable.)	35,938
Atlético Grau	Sullana (Note: For this season, Atlético Grau moved from Bernal to Sullana as their regular stadium Estadio Municipal de Bernal did not meet FPF requirements.)	Campeones del 36	12,000
Carlos A. Mannucci	Trujillo	Mansiche	25,036
Cienciano	Cusco	Garcilaso	45,056
Comerciantes Unidos	Cajabamba (Note: For this season, Comerciantes Unidos moved from Cutervo to Cajambaba as their regular stadium Estadio Juan Maldonado Gamarra did not meet FPF requirements.)	Germán Contreras Jara	6,300
Cusco	Cusco	Garcilaso	45,056
Deportivo Garcilaso	Cusco	Garcilaso	45,056
Los Chankas	Andahuaylas	Los Chankas	10,000
Melgar	Arequipa	Virgen de Chapi	40,370
Sport Boys	Callao	Miguel Grau	17,000
Sport Huancayo	Huancayo	Huancayo	20,000
Sporting Cristal	Lima	Alberto Gallardo	11,600
Unión Comercio	Tarapoto	Carlos Vidaurre García	18,000
Universidad César Vallejo	Trujillo	Mansiche	25,036
Universitario	Lima	Monumental	80,093
UTC	Cajabamba (Note: For this season, UTC moved from Cajamarca to Cajambaba as their regular stadium Estadio Héroes de San Ramón did not meet FPF requirements.)	Germán Contreras Jara	6,300

=== Personnel and kits ===
Team	Manager	Kit manufacturer	Main shirt sponsors
ADT	(Argentina) Claudio Biaggio	New Athletic	Caja Huancayo
Alianza Atlético	(Argentina) Gerardo Ameli	Walon	Caja Sullana, Coolbet
Alianza Lima	(Argentina) Mariano Soso	Nike	Apuesta Total
Atlético Grau	(Argentina) Ángel Comizzo	Walon	DoradoBet, Caja Piura
Carlos A. Mannucci	(Peru) Salomón Paredes	New Athletic	UPAO, DoradoBet
Cienciano	(Argentina) Christian Díaz	New Athletic	DoradoBet
Comerciantes Unidos	(Peru) Carlos Silvestri	Jave	Santísima
Cusco	(Argentina) Miguel Rondelli	Lotto	Caja Cusco, DoradoBet
Deportivo Garcilaso	(Argentina) Guillermo Duró	Walon	Salkantay Trekking
Los Chankas	(Argentina) César Vaioli (caretaker)	New Athletic	Cerveza Apurimeña, Pinturas Cykron
Melgar	(Peru) Marco Valencia	Walon	Betano
Sport Boys	(Argentina) Cristian Paulucci	Astro	Apuesta Total
Sport Huancayo	(Peru) Franco Navarro	Lotto	Caja Huancayo
Sporting Cristal	(Argentina) Guillermo Farré	Adidas	Caja Piura, DoradoBet
Unión Comercio	(Argentina) Alejandro Russo	Convert	
Universidad César Vallejo	(Peru) Luis Hernández	Astro	UCV, Caja Trujillo
Universitario	(Argentina) Fabián Bustos	Marathon	Apuesta Total
UTC	(Uruguay) Guillermo Sanguinetti	Lotto	Colegio Nivel A

=== Managerial changes ===
Team	Outgoing manager	Manner of departure	Date of vacancy	Position in table	Incoming manager	Date of appointment
Torneo Apertura
ADT	(Peru) Franco Navarro	End of contract	29 October 2023	Pre-season	(Argentina) Carlos Desio	11 November 2023
Carlos A. Mannucci	(Uruguay) Mario Viera	End of contract	29 October 2023	Pre-season	(Peru) Franco Navarro	5 November 2023
Cusco	(Peru) Luis Flores	End of contract	29 October 2023	Pre-season	(Argentina) Miguel Rondelli	26 November 2023
Unión Comercio	(Argentina) Marcelo Vivas	Sacked	30 October 2023	Pre-season	(Argentina) Néstor Craviotto	24 December 2023
Deportivo Garcilaso	(Argentina) Jorge Célico	Resigned	4 November 2023	Pre-season	(Argentina) Gerardo Ameli	21 November 2023
Alianza Lima	(Uruguay) Mauricio Larriera	Sacked	10 November 2023	Pre-season	(Colombia) Alejandro Restrepo	24 November 2023
Sporting Cristal	(Brazil) Tiago Nunes	End of contract	11 November 2023	Pre-season	(Brazil) Enderson Moreira	24 November 2023
Melgar	(Argentina) Mariano Soso	Mutual agreement	21 November 2023	Pre-season	(Argentina) Pablo De Muner	6 December 2023
Alianza Atlético	(Peru) Jorge Ágapo Gonzales	Demoted to the reserves	27 November 2023	Pre-season	(Argentina) Luciano Theiler	27 November 2023
Universitario	(Uruguay) Jorge Fossati	Mutual agreement	13 December 2023	Pre-season	(Argentina) Fabián Bustos	30 December 2023
Deportivo Garcilaso	(Argentina) Gerardo Ameli	Sacked	12 February 2024	18th	(Peru) Diego Cuvi (Note: Caretaker manager.)	14 February 2024
Deportivo Garcilaso	(Peru) Diego Cuvi	End of caretaker spell	19 February 2024	18th	(Colombia) Bernardo Redín	19 February 2024
Alianza Atlético	(Argentina) Luciano Theiler	Sacked	25 February 2024	15th	(Peru) Héctor Valle	25 February 2024
Alianza Atlético	(Peru) Héctor Valle	End of caretaker spell	1 March 2024	11th	(Peru) Jorge Espejo	1 March 2024
Melgar	(Argentina) Pablo De Muner	Sacked	3 March 2024	11th	(Peru) Marco Valencia (Note: Originally as a caretaker manager, appointed on a permanent basis on 28 May 2024.)	3 March 2024
Universidad César Vallejo	(Peru) Roberto Mosquera	Mutual agreement	15 March 2024	17th	(Peru) Guillermo Salas	21 March 2024
Unión Comercio	(Argentina) Néstor Craviotto	Resigned	15 March 2024	18th	(Colombia) Milton García	29 March 2024
Los Chankas	(Peru) Juan Carlos Bazalar	Mutual agreement	29 March 2024	12th	(Peru) Abraham Montoya	6 April 2024
Sport Huancayo	(Peru) Wilmar Valencia	Sacked	1 April 2024	7th	(Peru) Mifflin Bermúdez	1 April 2024
Carlos A. Mannucci	(Peru) Franco Navarro	Mutual agreement	7 April 2024	17th	(Peru) Salomón Paredes	7 April 2024
Los Chankas	(Peru) Abraham Montoya	End of caretaker spell	15 April 2024	15th	(Uruguay) Pablo Bossi	15 April 2024
Sport Boys	(Argentina) Fernando Gamboa	Mutual agreement	19 April 2024	14th	(Peru) Juan Alayo (Note: Originally as a caretaker manager, appointed on a permanent basis on 7 June 2024.)	19 April 2024
Carlos A. Mannucci	(Peru) Salomón Paredes	End of caretaker spell	20 April 2024	17th	(Brazil) Milton Mendes	20 April 2024
Unión Comercio	(Colombia) Milton García	Sacked	18 May 2024	18th	(Peru) Andy Loayza	18 May 2024
Torneo Clausura
Unión Comercio	(Peru) Andy Loayza	End of caretaker spell	27 May 2024	Pre-tournament	(Peru) Jesús Oropesa	3 June 2024
Alianza Atlético	(Peru) Jorge Espejo	Sacked	28 May 2024	Pre-tournament	(Argentina) Gerardo Ameli	3 June 2024
Sporting Cristal	(Brazil) Enderson Moreira	Sacked	31 May 2024	Pre-tournament	(Argentina) Guillermo Farré	12 June 2024
Deportivo Garcilaso	(Colombia) Bernardo Redín	Mutual agreement	8 June 2024	Pre-tournament	(Argentina) Guillermo Duró	14 June 2024
Sport Huancayo	(Peru) Mifflin Bermúdez	End of caretaker spell	11 June 2024	Pre-tournament	(Peru) Franco Navarro	11 June 2024
ADT	(Argentina) Carlos Desio	Resigned	16 June 2024	Pre-tournament	(Peru) Wilmar Valencia	17 June 2024
Alianza Lima	(Colombia) Alejandro Restrepo	Sacked	27 July 2024	5th	(Peru) Diego Ortiz	27 July 2024
Carlos A. Mannucci	(Brazil) Milton Mendes	Mutual agreement	27 July 2024	18th	(Peru) Salomón Paredes	27 July 2024
Cienciano	(Peru) Óscar Ibáñez	Sacked	3 August 2024	15th	(Argentina) Christian Díaz	5 August 2024
Alianza Lima	(Peru) Diego Ortiz	End of caretaker spell	6 August 2024	1st	(Argentina) Mariano Soso	6 August 2024
UTC	(Argentina) Carlos Ramacciotti	Sacked	6 August 2024	14th	(Peru) José Infante (Note: Alberto Peña was the caretaker manager for the Torneo Clausura 6th round match against Unión Comercio.)	12 August 2024
Unión Comercio	(Peru) Jesús Oropesa	Health issues	9 August 2024	18th	(Peru) Kenji Aparicio	9 August 2024
Universidad César Vallejo	(Peru) Guillermo Salas	Mutual agreement	13 August 2024	17th	(Peru) Luis Hernández	13 August 2024
UTC	(Peru) José Infante	End of caretaker spell	20 August 2024	13th	(Uruguay) Guillermo Sanguinetti	20 August 2024
Unión Comercio	(Peru) Kenji Aparicio	End of caretaker spell	22 August 2024	18th	(Argentina) Alejandro Russo	22 August 2024
Sport Boys	(Peru) Juan Alayo	Resigned	21 September 2024	14th	(Peru) Guillermo Vásquez	22 September 2024
ADT	(Peru) Wilmar Valencia	Mutual agreement	24 September 2024	10th	(Peru) Carlos Gutiérrez	24 September 2024
Los Chankas	(Uruguay) Pablo Bossi	Mutual agreement	25 September 2024	13th	(Argentina) César Vaioli	26 September 2024
Sport Boys	(Peru) Guillermo Vásquez	End of caretaker spell	3 October 2024	13th	(Argentina) Cristian Paulucci	3 October 2024
ADT	(Peru) Carlos Gutiérrez	End of caretaker spell	7 October 2024	11th	(Argentina) Claudio Biaggio	7 October 2024

== Torneo Apertura ==
=== Standings ===
Pos	Team	Pld	W	D	L	GF	GA	GD	Pts	Qualification
1	Universitario	17	12	4	1	32	7	+25	40	Advance to the Playoffs
2	Sporting Cristal	17	13	1	3	44	20	+24	40	
3	Melgar	17	12	2	3	36	19	+17	38	
4	Alianza Lima	17	11	0	6	32	16	+16	33	
5	Cusco	17	9	2	6	22	21	+1	29	
6	ADT	17	8	4	5	29	24	+5	28	
7	Cienciano	17	6	8	3	20	20	0	26	
8	Comerciantes Unidos	17	6	4	7	22	31	−9	22	
9	Los Chankas	17	6	3	8	25	26	−1	21	
10	Universidad César Vallejo	17	4	8	5	19	24	−5	20	
11	Atlético Grau	17	4	7	6	19	17	+2	19	
12	Sport Boys	17	5	4	8	18	20	−2	19	
13	Sport Huancayo	17	5	4	8	18	29	−11	19	
14	UTC	17	4	4	9	21	29	−8	16	
15	Deportivo Garcilaso	17	3	5	9	20	26	−6	14	
16	Alianza Atlético	17	3	5	9	11	19	−8	14	
17	Carlos A. Mannucci	17	3	5	9	11	34	−23	14	
18	Unión Comercio	17	1	6	10	17	34	−17	9	

Source: Liga 1, Soccerway
Rules for classification: 1) Points; 2) Goal difference; 3) Goals for; 4) Fair play points; 5) Drawing of lots.

=== Results ===
Home \ Away	ADT	AAS	ALI	CAG	CAM	CIE	COM	CUS	GAR	CHA	MEL	SBA	SHU	CRI	UCO	UCV	UNI	UTC
ADT			2–0		4–0	1–1	2–0		2–2							1–0	2–0	2–1
Alianza Atlético	1–2		0–2		0–0	0–1			3–0						2–0	1–1		2–0
Alianza Lima				2–0			5–1		3–2	3–0		3–0		1–2		2–1	0–1	1–0
Atlético Grau	2–2	1–1			3–0	1–1		4–0			1–2	0–0	0–0		1–0			
Carlos A. Mannucci			0–4				1–3		1–1	2–1		1–0		0–4		0–0	0–4	2–0
Cienciano			2–1		2–2		1–0		0–2			3–2		2–2		1–1	0–0	1–1
Comerciantes Unidos		0–0		2–2				0–1		3–2	0–0		3–2	0–1	3–1			
Cusco	3–2	2–0	3–0		3–0	2–0			1–0						1–0			1–1
Deportivo Garcilaso				0–0			1–2			1–1	1–3		0–2	2–3		2–0	2–2	
Los Chankas	2–0	2–0		0–1		1–2		2–0			2–2	2–0	6–0		2–1			
Melgar	3–1	1–0	1–0		2–0	2–0		2–3				2–1	4–1		2–1			
Sport Boys	1–0	0–0					1–1	3–0	2–0					1–3	0–0	2–0	1–2	
Sport Huancayo	0–2	4–0	0–2		1–0	1–2		2–0				1–0			2–2			1–1
Sporting Cristal	6–2	2–1		1–0				2–0		4–1	1–2		4–0		5–1			
Unión Comercio	2–2		1–3		2–2	1–1			0–4							2–2	1–2	2–0
Universidad César Vallejo				2–1			3–1	2–2		1–1	3–2		1–1	2–1			0–0	
Universitario		1–0		1–0			6–0	1–0		4–0	2–0		2–0	4–1				
UTC				3–2			2–3		1–0	2–0	2–6	2–4		1–2		4–0	0–0	

Source: Liga 1, Soccerway
Legend: Blue = home team win; Yellow = draw; Red = away team win.

== Torneo Clausura ==
=== Standings ===
Pos	Team	Pld	W	D	L	GF	GA	GD	Pts	Qualification
1	Universitario	17	11	4	2	31	10	+21	37	Advance to the Playoffs
2	Alianza Lima	17	11	3	3	24	12	+12	36	
3	Sporting Cristal	17	10	4	3	47	15	+32	34	
4	Melgar	17	9	5	3	30	16	+14	32	
5	Atlético Grau	17	8	8	1	25	11	+14	32	
6	Cusco	17	9	4	4	29	22	+7	31	
7	Alianza Atlético	17	8	6	3	17	15	+2	30	
8	Cienciano	17	8	2	7	28	24	+4	26	
9	ADT	17	6	5	6	18	16	+2	23	
10	Deportivo Garcilaso	17	7	2	8	17	17	0	23	
11	Sport Huancayo	17	5	4	8	21	28	−7	19	
12	Los Chankas	17	4	6	7	17	21	−4	18	
13	Carlos A. Mannucci	17	4	5	8	23	30	−7	17	
14	Sport Boys	17	4	4	9	14	31	−17	16	
15	UTC	17	3	6	8	14	24	−10	15	
16	Comerciantes Unidos	17	3	4	10	14	29	−15	13	
17	Universidad César Vallejo	17	2	4	11	15	31	−16	10	
18	Unión Comercio	17	2	2	13	13	45	−32	8	

Source: Liga 1, Soccerway
Rules for classification: 1) Points; 2) Goal difference; 3) Goals for; 4) Fair play points; 5) Drawing of lots.

=== Results ===
Home \ Away	ADT	AAS	ALI	CAG	CAM	CIE	COM	CUS	GAR	CHA	MEL	SBA	SHU	CRI	UCO	UCV	UNI	UTC
ADT		0–1		1–2				1–2		2–1	1–1	1–0	2–1	3–1	2–0			
Alianza Atlético				0–0			1–0	1–1		1–0	3–1	2–0	1–1	1–0			0–3	
Alianza Lima	0–0	2–0			1–0	3–0		1–2			1–1		2–1		1–0			
Atlético Grau			1–0				3–0		2–2	1–1				1–1		3–1	1–1	4–0
Carlos A. Mannucci	3–2	2–2		1–1		1–2		4–1			1–1		1–2		0–0			
Cienciano	0–1	3–0		1–0				1–2		0–0	3–1		3–1		7–0			
Comerciantes Unidos	0–0		1–3		2–1	1–2			2–1			0–0				2–0	0–2	1–1
Cusco				0–1			2–1			2–1	0–3	3–1	3–0	1–1		2–1	1–1	
Deportivo Garcilaso	1–0	0–1	1–2		1–0	1–0		0–2				2–0			3–1			1–0
Los Chankas			0–1		1–1		2–0		1–0					3–3		2–1	0–0	1–1
Melgar				0–0			3–0		1–1	2–0				2–0		5–2	1–0	1–0
Sport Boys			0–3	0–0	2–6	2–0				2–1	0–2		2–1					1–1
Sport Huancayo				1–3			2–2		1–0	3–1	2–4			1–2		1–0	1–1	
Sporting Cristal			0–0		4–0	5–1	3–0		1–0			4–0				4–1	2–1	4–0
Unión Comercio		1–2		1–2			3–2	3–3		1–2	2–1	0–2	0–1	0–12				
Universidad César Vallejo	0–0	0–0	2–3		0–2	2–2			0–2			2–2			1–0			2–0
Universitario	2–1		2–1		6–0	3–1			3–1			3–0			1–0	1–0		1–0
UTC	1–1	1–1	0–1		2–0	1–2		2–1					1–1		3–1			

Source: Liga 1, Soccerway
Legend: Blue = home team win; Yellow = draw; Red = away team win.

== Playoffs ==
Since Universitario won both the Apertura and Clausura tournaments, no playoff games were played and Universitario were declared as season champions. Sporting Cristal, as the team that placed second in the aggregate table, were declared as season runners-up and both teams qualified for the Copa Libertadores group stage.

== Aggregate table ==
Pos	Team	Pld	W	D	L	GF	GA	GD	Pts	Qualification
1	Universitario (C)	34	23	8	3	63	17	+46	77	Qualification for Copa Libertadores group stage
2	Sporting Cristal	34	23	5	6	91	35	+56	74	Qualification for Copa Libertadores group stage
3	Melgar	34	21	7	6	66	35	+31	70	Qualification for Copa Libertadores second stage
4	Alianza Lima	34	22	3	9	57	27	+30	69	Qualification for Copa Libertadores first stage
5	Cusco	34	18	6	10	50	44	+6	60	Qualification for Copa Sudamericana first stage
6	Cienciano	34	14	10	10	48	44	+4	52	Qualification for Copa Sudamericana first stage
7	Atlético Grau	34	12	15	7	44	28	+16	51	Qualification for Copa Sudamericana first stage
8	ADT	34	14	9	11	47	40	+7	51	Qualification for Copa Sudamericana first stage
9	Alianza Atlético	34	11	11	12	28	34	−6	44	
10	Los Chankas	34	10	9	15	42	47	−5	39	
11	Sport Huancayo	34	10	8	16	39	57	−18	38	
12	Deportivo Garcilaso	34	10	7	17	37	43	−6	37	
13	Sport Boys	34	9	8	17	32	51	−19	35	
14	Comerciantes Unidos	34	9	8	17	36	60	−24	35	
15	UTC	34	7	10	17	35	53	−18	31	
16	Carlos A. Mannucci (R)	34	7	10	17	34	64	−30	31	Relegation to Liga 2
17	Universidad César Vallejo (R)	34	6	12	16	34	55	−21	30	Relegation to Liga 2
18	Unión Comercio (R)	34	3	8	23	30	79	−49	17	Relegation to Liga 2

Source: Liga 1
Rules for classification: 1) Points; 2) Goal difference; 3) Goals for; 4) Head-to-head points; 5) Head-to-head goal difference; 6) Head-to-head goals for; 7) Fair play points; 8) Drawing of lots.
(C) Champions; (R) Relegated

== Top scorers ==
Rank	Player	Club	Goals
1	(Uruguay) Martín Cauteruccio	Sporting Cristal	35
2	(Ecuador) Carlos Garcés	Cienciano	19
3	(Colombia) Jarlín Quintero	UTC	17
4	(Argentina) Lucas Cano	Sport Huancayo	16
5	(Argentina) Bernardo Cuesta	Melgar	15
6	(Argentina) Hernán Barcos	Alianza Lima	14
6	(Argentina) Neri Bandiera	Atlético Grau	14
6	(Argentina) Santiago González	Sporting Cristal	14
9	(Argentina) Matías Sen	Comerciantes Unidos	13
9	(Peru) Alex Valera	Universitario	13

Source: Futbolperuano.com

== See also ==
- 2024 Liga 2
- 2024 Copa Perú
- 2024 Ligas Departamentales del Perú
- 2024 Torneo de Promoción y Reserva
- 2024 Liga Femenina
