= Juan Vergara =

Juan Vergara might refer to:

- Juan Pablo Vergara (1985–2019), Peruvian footballer
- Juan de Vergara (1492–1557), Spanish humanist
- Juan José Gurruchaga Vergara (born 1977), Chilean actor
