= 2024 Sporting Cristal season =

Football league season

Sporting Cristal
2024 season
- Stadium: Alberto Gallardo, Lima
- Liga 1: Tornel Apertura: Second (2°); Tornel Clausura: Third (3°); Aggregate Table: Second (2°); Runner-up National (2°)
- Copa Bicentenario: Cancelled for COVID-19
- Copa Libertadores: Second stage
Home colours	Away colours	Third colours

The 2024 Sporting Cristal season were the Sixty-Nineth (69.º) of the club from its foundation in 1955, Sixty-Nine (69) participations consecutives in the top-flight of Peruvian Primera División (of 108 Editions) with denomination last Liga 1. In Previous Season the club qualified as 3rd Place of the 2023 Liga 1.

Sporting Cristal were a of eighteen (18) clubs in the Sixth edition (6.º) Liga 1, the competition most important of the Peruvian football. The club played the Peruvian Primera División and Copa Libertadores for Thirty-Nineth (39th) Time.

== Liga 1 ==
=== Torneo Apertura ===
Pos	Team	Pld	W	D	L	GF	GA	GD	Pts
1	Universitario	17	12	4	1	32	7	+25	40
2	Sporting Cristal	17	13	1	3	44	20	+24	40
3	FBC Melgar	17	12	2	3	36	19	+17	38

== See also ==
- Club Sporting Cristal
- 2024 Liga 1
