= Independiente =

Independiente may refer to:

- the Spanish word for independent

== Music ==
- Independiente (record label), a record label formed in 1997
- Independiente (Dragon Ash album), 2007
- Independiente (Ricardo Arjona album), 2011
- Independiente, an album by Tito Rojas, 2011

== Sports clubs ==
=== Argentina ===
- Club Atlético Independiente, a football club based in Avellaneda
- Club Sportivo Independiente, a basketball club based in General Pico
- Independiente de Bigand, a football club based in Bigand
- Independiente de Neuquén, a football club based in Neuquén
- Independiente Rivadavia, a football club based in Mendoza

=== Everywhere else ===
- Atlético Independiente, a Honduran football club
- Independiente F.C., a Panamanian football club
- Independiente F.B.C., a Paraguayan football club
- Independiente Medellín, a Colombian football club
- Independiente Nacional 1906, a Salvadoran football club
- Independiente Rugby Club, a Spanish rugby union club
- Independiente Santa Fe, a Colombian football club
- Independiente del Valle, an Ecuadorian football club

== Religion ==
- a member of the Philippine Independent Church

== See also ==
- Independent (disambiguation)
