= Estadio Germán Contreras Jara =

Football stadium in Peru

- Interactive map of Estadio Germán Contreras Jara
- Address: La Torre 499, Cajabamba 06351, Peru
- Location: Cajabamba, Peru
- Coordinates: 7.615265138452753°S 78.04687011534163°W
- Operator: Instituto Peruano del Deporte
- Capacity: 6,300
- Surface: Grass

Tenants
- UTC

Estadio Germán Contreras Jara is a football stadium located in Cajabamba, Peru.

During the 2024 Liga football season, it served as the home stadium of Universidad Técnica de Cajamarca, a Peruvian Primera División football club also called UTC. The stadium became UTC's home ground, since their original stadium Estadio Héroes de San Ramón did not meet the Peruvian Football Federation's standards for the Liga 1.

== History ==
The stadium is located in Peru and was formerly, the home stadium of Deportivo Llacuabamba. It was an architectural field structure with the capacity of containing 6300 people.
