= Donald Millán =

Colombian footballer (born 1986)

Personal information
- Full name: Donald Diego Millán Rodríguez
- Date of birth: March 21, 1986 (age 40)
- Place of birth: Cali, Colombia
- Height: 1.81 m (5 ft 11 in)
- Position: Midfielder

Team information
- Current team: Unión Comercio
- Number: 25

Youth career
- Deportivo Cali

Senior career*
Years	Team	Apps	(Gls)
2005–2008	Deportivo Cali	3	(0)
2006–2007	→ Atlético Huila (loan)	38	(5)
2008–2009	Deportes Tolima	7	(0)
2009–2010	América de Cali	3	(1)
2010	Cortuluá	14	(5)
2011	Cúcuta Deportivo	22	(3)
2012	Real Cartagena	9	(3)
2012–2013	La Equidad	26	(0)
2013–2017	César Vallejo	89	(20)
2017–2018	UTC	82	(24)
2019	Binacional	33	(23)
2020	Universitario	28	(4)
2021	César Vallejo	16	(2)
2022	UTC	28	(6)
2023	Sport Huancayo	15	(0)
2024-	Unión Comercio	6	(0)
- * Club domestic league appearances and goals as of 15 March 2024

Donald Diego Millán Rodríguez (born March 21, 1986) is a Colombian professional footballer who plays as an attacking midfielder for Unión Comercio of the Peruvian Liga 1. He is nicknamed "mago" (magician) for his ability to run the offense with the role of playmaker.

== Career statistics ==
As of 15 March 2024

Club	Division	Season	League		Cup		Continental		Total	
Club	Division	Season	Apps	Goals	Apps	Goals	Apps	Goals	Apps	Goals
Deportivo Cali	Categoría Primera A	2005 (A)	1	0	—		—		1	0
Deportivo Cali	Categoría Primera A	2008 (A)	2	0	—		—		2	0
Deportivo Cali	Total		3	0	0	0	0	0	3	0
Cortuluá	Categoría Primera B	2006 (A)	22	1	—		—		22	1
Cortuluá	Categoría Primera A	2010 (F)	14	5	—		—		14	5
Cortuluá	Total		36	6	0	0	0	0	36	6
Atlético Huila	Categoría Primera A	2006-07	38	5	—		—		38	5
Deportes Tolima	Categoría Primera A	2008 (F)	5	0	—		—		5	0
Deportes Tolima	Categoría Primera A	2009 (A)	2	0	—		—		2	0
Deportes Tolima	Total		7	0	0	0	0	0	7	0
América de Cali	Categoría Primera A	2009 (F)	3	1	—		—		3	1
Cúcuta Deportivo	Categoría Primera A	2011	22	3	8	0	—		30	3
Real Cartagena	Categoría Primera A	2012 (A)	16	4	4	2	—		20	6
La Equidad	Categoría Primera A	2012 (F)	4	0	2	0	1	0	7	0
La Equidad	Categoría Primera A	2013	22	0	7	2	5	0	34	2
La Equidad	Total		26	0	9	2	6	0	41	2
César Vallejo	Torneo Descentralizado	2014	26	4	11	2	8	1	45	7
César Vallejo	Torneo Descentralizado	2015	34	7	11	4	—		45	11
César Vallejo	Torneo Descentralizado	2016	29	7	—		2	0	31	7
César Vallejo	Liga 1	2021	16	2	—		—		16	2
César Vallejo	Total		105	20	22	6	10	1	137	27
UTC	Torneo Descentralizado	2017	43	11	—		—		43	11
UTC	Torneo Descentralizado	2018	39	13	—		2	0	41	13
UTC	Liga 1	2022	28	6	—		—		28	6
UTC	Total		110	30	0	0	2	0	112	30
Binacional	Liga 1	2019	33	23	3	3	2	0	38	26
Universitario	Liga 1	2020	28	4	2	0	4	0	34	4
Sport Huancayo	Liga 1	2023	15	0	—		2	1	17	1
Unión Comercio	Liga 1	2024	6	0	—		—		6	0
Career total			448	90	48	13	26	2	522	105

== Honours ==
Deportivo Binacional

- 2019 Liga 1 (Peru)

Universitario de Deportes

- Torneo Apertura 2020

Universidad César Vallejo

- 2015 Torneo del Inca

=== Individual ===
- Peruvian Liga 1 Player of the Year: 2019
- Peruvian Liga 1 Team of the Year: 2019

== 2019 Car Accident ==
On 2 December 2019, Donald Millán was involved in a car accident along with teammates Juan Pablo Vergara and Jeferson Collazos. The three footballers were headed to Juliaca from Puno to train with Deportivo Binacional as preparation for their upcoming series of matches for the championship round of the Peruvian Liga 1 playoffs. Around 14:30 PET, Vergara's car flipped on the side of the Puno–Juliaca road due to slippery conditions caused by rain and hail. The three were helped out of the vehicle by local rescuers and taken to a local clinic. Millán and Collazos were discharged unharmed but Vergara was in critical condition. Hours later, Binacional announced the death of Vergara.
