= Acebal, Argentina =

Acebal
- Town
- Location of Acebal in Argentina
- Coordinates: 33°14′S 60°50′W
- Country: Argentina
- Province: Santa Fe
- Department: Rosario

Population
  - Total: 4,814
- Time zone: UTC−3 (ART)
- CPA base: S2109
- Dialing code: +54 3469

Acebal is a town (comuna) in the south of the province of Santa Fe, Argentina, 30 km (19 mi) from Rosario and 268 km (167 mi) south of the provincial capital Santa Fe. It has 5,377 inhabitants per the 2010 census [INDEC].

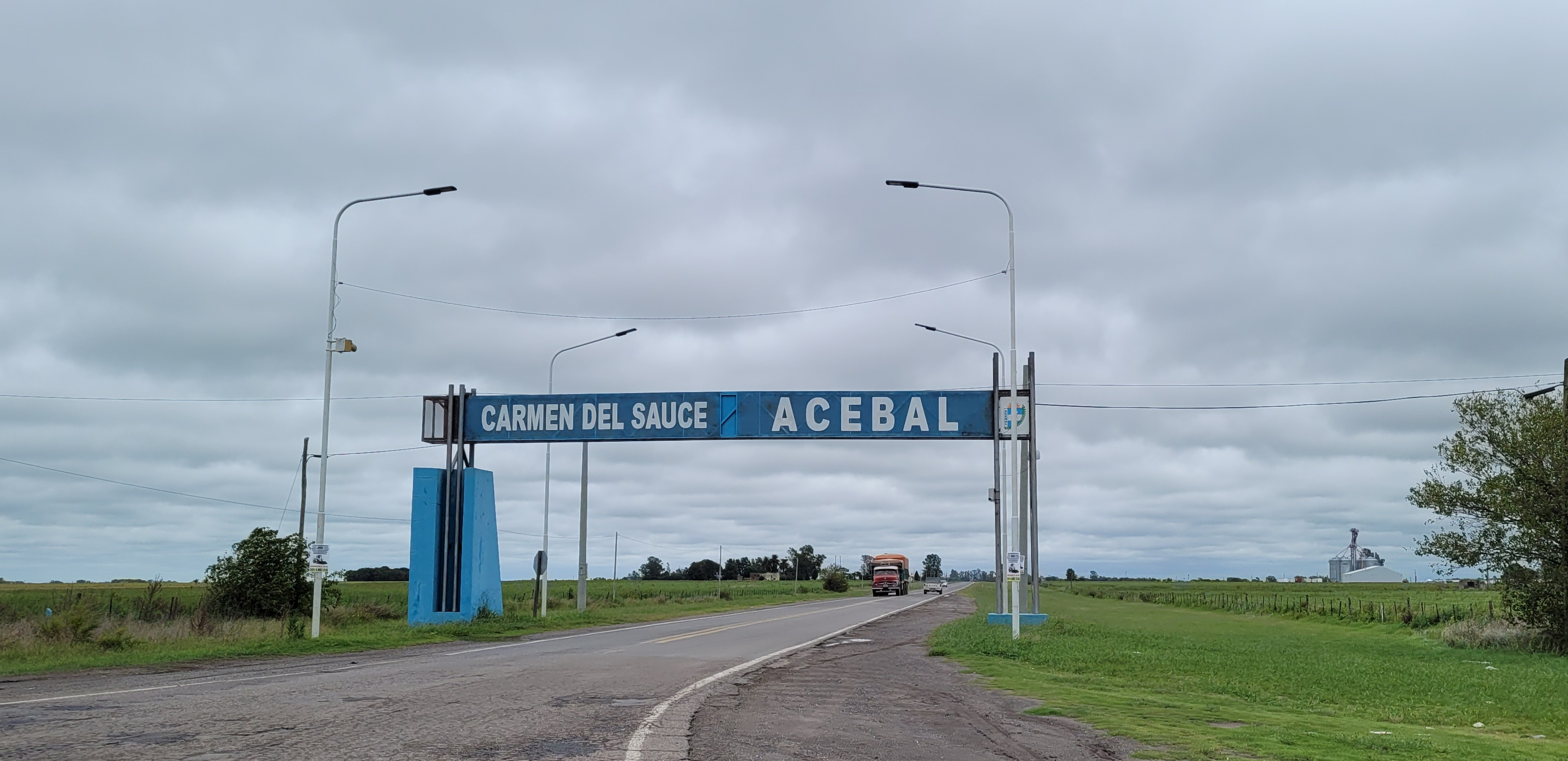
Acebal sign on the Road to Acebal

The town was founded in 1890 by Amador Acebal. The local administration was formally created on 19 December 1895.

The land where the town is today belonged to Amador Acebal and his wife, María Saa Pereyra de Acebal. And they donated them to the then Central Argentine Railway for the laying of the tracks of the Rosario - Peyrano line . The couple made it a condition that a station be established within their fields, inaugurated in February 1891. Months before, on July 22, 1890, a decree from the Santa Fe Government approved the plans for the newly founded town. Later, on December 19, 1895, the Development Commission was created.

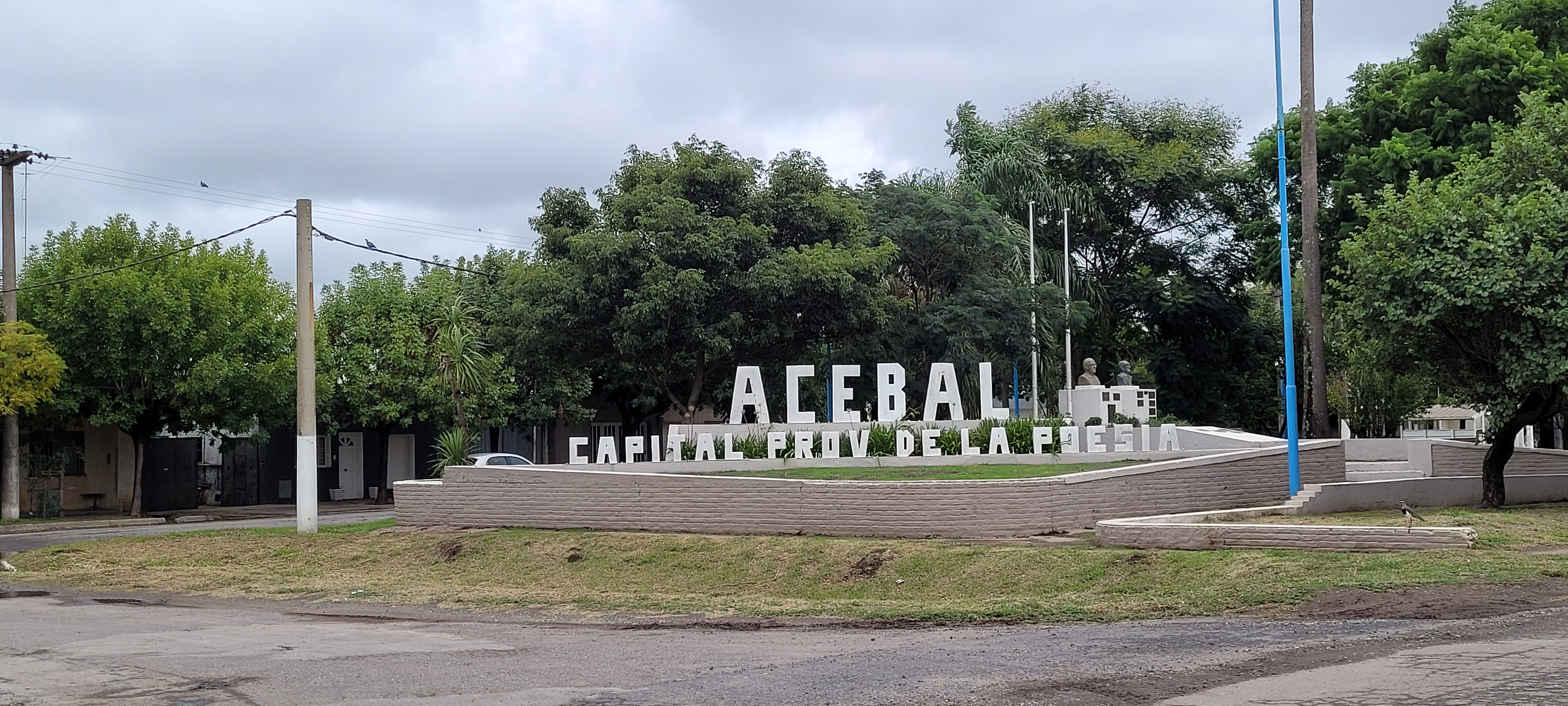
Entry sign in Acebal, Argentina

It is known as the national footwear capital. The sector represents almost 60 percent of the town's activity. In 2017, the drop in sales and imports reduced production to less than half, causing a serious crisis.
