= Ronny Revollar =

Peruvian football manager (born 1976

Personal information
- Full name: Ronny Dwig Revollar Miranda
- Date of birth: 26 February 1976 (age 50)
- Place of birth: Lima, Peru
- Position: Defender

Team information
- Current team: ADA Cajabamba (manager)

Youth career
- Alianza Lima
- Sport Boys

Senior career*
Years	Team	Apps	(Gls)
1996	Hijos de Yurimaguas		
1997	Bella Esperanza		
1998	Alfonso Ugarte		
1999	Telefunken 20		
2000	Deportivo Wanka		
2002	Las Torres de Limatambo		
2003	San Francisco de Borja		
2004	Deport San Borja		

Managerial career
- 2009: Academia Tito Drago
- 2010: Deport San Borja
- 2011: Las Torres de Limatambo
- 2012: San Agustín
- 2013: San Francisco de Borja
- 2014: Deport San Borja
- 2017: Alianza Universidad (assistant)
- 2018–2021: Alianza Universidad
- 2022: Deportivo Llacuabamba
- 2022: Deportivo Verdecocha
- 2023: Atlético Verdún
- 2023: Alfonso Ugarte
- 2024: Miguel Grau de Abancay
- 2024–: ADA Cajabamba
- * Club domestic league appearances and goals

Ronny Dwig Revollar Miranda (born 26 February 1976) is a Peruvian football manager and former player who played as a defender. He is the current manager of ADA Cajabamba.

== Playing career ==
Born Lima, Revollar represented Alianza Lima and Sport Boys as a youth. He made his senior debut in 1996 with Segunda División side Hijos de Yurimaguas, and represented fellow league team Bella Esperanza in the following year.

In 1999, Revollar played in the Copa Perú with Alfonso Ugarte de Puno. After another year in the second division with Telefunken 20, he made his Primera División debut in 2001 with Deportivo Wanka.

Revollar would subsequently resume his career in the lower levels, representing Las Torres de Limatambo, San Francisco de Borja and Deport San Borja. He retired with the latter in 2004, aged 28.

== Managerial career ==
After starting his career in the lower leagues, mainly associated to the clubs he represented as a player, Revollar joined Alianza Universidad in February 2016, as a youth coordinator. He was the assistant manager for the 2017 season, and was named manager for the 2018 campaign.

Revollar finished as runners-up in the Copa Perú with Alianza for the 2018, and achieved promotion to the top tier in the play-offs.
