= Juan Pablo Vergara =

Peruvian footballer (1985–2019)

Personal information
- Full name: Juan Pablo Vergara Martínez
- Date of birth: 24 February 1985
- Place of birth: Lima, Peru
- Date of death: 2 December 2019 (aged 34)
- Place of death: Juliaca, Peru
- Height: 1.68 m (5 ft 6 in)
- Position: Midfielder

Senior career*
Years	Team	Apps	(Gls)
2009	Sport Áncash	32	(9)
2010	CNI	35	(7)
2011	César Vallejo	7	(2)
2011	Sport Boys	12	(0)
2012	Real Garcilaso	8	(1)
2012	Inti Gas	6	(0)
2013	Alfonso Ugarte	22	(12)
2014	Los Caimanes	8	(1)
2014	Atlético Minero	9	(6)
2015	Sport Loreto	30	(4)
2016–2018	UTC	106	(24)
2019	Binacional	21	(6)
Total		296	(72)
- * Club domestic league appearances and goals

Juan Pablo Vergara Martínez (24 February 1985 – 2 December 2019) was a Peruvian professional footballer who played as a midfielder.

== Career ==
Born in Lima, Vergara began his professional football career in 2003, when he debuted for Universitario de Deportes. He would then go on to play for various clubs in Peru such as Sport Áncash, CNI, César Vallejo, Sport Boys, Real Garcilaso, Inti Gas, Alfonso Ugarte de Puno, Los Caimanes, Atlético Minero, Sport Loreto, UTC and Deportivo Binacional. With Binacional, Vergara won the 2019 Torneo Apertura and qualified for the championship round of the 2019 Peruvian Liga 1 playoffs. However, a car accident a few days before the scheduled matches for the championship round resulted in his tragic death.

== Death ==
On 2 December 2019, Vergara was involved in a car accident along with teammates Donald Millán and Jeferson Collazos. The three footballers were headed to Juliaca from Puno to train with Deportivo Binacional as preparation for their upcoming series of matches for the championship round of the 2019 Peruvian Liga 1 playoffs. Around 14:30 PET, Vergara's car flipped on the side of the Puno–Juliaca road due to slippery conditions caused by rain and hail. The three were helped out of the vehicle by local rescuers and taken to Clínica Americana, a clinic in Juliaca. Millán and Collazos were discharged unharmed but Vergara was in critical condition. Binacional then announced through its social media networks that blood donors were needed for surgical intervention. Hours later, the club announced the passing of Vergara. The clinic indicated through a press release that the impact of the steering wheel with Vergara resulted in "a severe massive hemorrhage in the left hemithorax." Vergara suffered a perforation of the liver by a broken rib, triggering a hemorrhage. Despite the early intervention of the doctors, the player died.

== Career statistics ==
Club	Season	League			National Cup		International Cup		Total	
Club	Season	Division	Apps	Goals	Apps	Goals	Apps	Goals	Apps	Goals
Sport Áncash	2009	Torneo Descentralizado	32	9	-	-	-	-	32	9
CNI	2010	Torneo Descentralizado	35	7	-	-	-	-	35	7
César Vallejo	2011	Torneo Descentralizado	7	2	-	-	-	-	7	2
Sport Boys	2011	Torneo Descentralizado	12	0	-	-	-	-	12	0
Real Garcilaso	2012	Torneo Descentralizado	8	1	-	-	-	-	8	1
Inti Gas	2012	Torneo Descentralizado	6	0	-	-	1	0	7	0
Alfonso Ugarte	2013	Segunda División	22	12	-	-	-	-	22	12
Los Caimanes	2014	Torneo Descentralizado	8	1	6	1	-	-	14	2
Atlético Minero	2014	Segunda División	9	6	-	-	-	-	9	6
Sport Loreto	2015	Torneo Descentralizado	30	4	7	0	-	-	37	4
UTC	2016	Torneo Descentralizado	42	10	-	-	-	-	42	10
UTC	2017	Torneo Descentralizado	36	8	-	-	-	-	36	8
UTC	2018	Torneo Descentralizado	28	6	-	-	1	0	29	6
Binacional	2019	Liga 1	21	6	3	0	1	0	25	6
Career total			296	72	16	1	3	0	315	73

== Honours ==
=== Club ===
Alfonso Ugarte

- Peruvian Segunda División runner-up: 2013

Deportivo Binacional

- Torneo Apertura: 2019
- Liga 1: 2019

=== Individual ===
- Peruvian Segunda División Player of the Year: 2013
- Peruvian Liga 1 Goal of the Year: 2019.
