= Marcelo Vivas =

Argentine football manager

Personal information
- Full name: José Marcelo Vivas
- Date of birth: 8 February 1966 (age 60)
- Place of birth: Santa Fe, Argentina

Youth career
- 1978–1984: Newell's Old Boys

Senior career*
Years	Team	Apps	(Gls)
1984–1986	Newell's Old Boys		
1984	→ Tiro Federal (loan)		
1986–1987	Central Córdoba		

Managerial career
- 1987–1995: Newell's Old Boys (youth)
- 2007–2009: Estudiantes (youth)
- 2010: Central Córdoba (youth)
- 2011: Central Córdoba
- 2011: Independiente de Bigand
- 2011–2012: Tiro Federal (youth)
- 2012–2014: San Martín SJ (youth)
- 2012: San Martín SJ (interim)
- 2013: San Martín SJ (interim)
- 2014: San Martín SJ (interim)
- 2014: Central Córdoba
- 2015: Real Garcilaso (youth)
- 2016–2017: León (assistant)
- 2018–2019: Unión Comercio
- 2019–2020: Sport Boys
- 2021: Alianza Atlético
- 2022: Ayacucho
- 2023: Carlos Stein
- 2023: Unión Comercio
- * Club domestic league appearances and goals

José Marcelo Vivas (born 8 February 1966) is an Argentine football manager and former player.

== Career ==
Vivas was born in Santa Fe, and was a Newell's Old Boys youth graduate. He made his senior debut while on loan at Tiro Federal in 1984, and also played for Central Córdoba de Rosario before retiring in 1987 due to an ankle and fibula injury.

Immediately after retiring, Vivas returned to Newell's as a youth coach. He subsequently worked under the same role at Estudiantes de La Plata and Central Córdoba before being named manager of the latter's first team in February 2011.

On 10 September 2011, Vivas resigned after his family received threats, and subsequently worked for a short period at Independiente de Bigand and Tiro Federal's youth categories before being named youth coordinator at San Martín de San Juan in February 2012. At the latter side, he was also an interim manager on three occasions.

On 17 June 2014, Vivas returned to Central Córdoba, but resigned on 1 October. He moved to Peru in the following year, after being named manager of Real Garcilaso's youth sides, and was later an assistant of Javier Torrente at Mexican side León.

On 26 June 2018, Vivas was appointed manager of Unión Comercio. He left on a mutual agreement on 5 May of the following year, and took over fellow league team Sport Boys on 9 July.

On 13 September 2020, Vivas resigned from Sport Boys, and was named at the helm of Alianza Atlético the following 25 August. He continued to work in the country in the following years, being in charge of Ayacucho, Carlos Stein and Unión Comercio.

== Personal life ==
Vivas' younger brother Claudio is also a football manager.
