= Claudio Vivas =

Argentinian football manager (born 1968)

Personal information
- Full name: Claudio Alejandro Vivas
- Date of birth: 12 August 1968 (age 58)
- Place of birth: Rosario, Argentina
- Position: Goalkeeper

Youth career
- Years: Team
- Newell's Old Boys

Managerial career
- 1990–1992: Newell's Old Boys (assistant)
- 1993–1995: Atlas (assistant)
- 1995–1996: América (assistant)
- 1997–1998: Vélez Sarsfield (assistant)
- 1998: Espanyol (assistant)
- 1998–2004: Argentina (assistant)
- 2008–2009: Argentinos Juniors
- 2009–2010: Racing Club
- 2010–2011: Instituto
- 2011–2013: Athletic Bilbao (assistant)
- 2013: Sporting Cristal
- 2013–2014: Chile U-20
- 2015–2016: Banfield
- 2017–2019: Boca Juniors (academy director)
- 2019: Sporting Cristal
- 2019–2020: Bolívar
- 2021: Cusco
- 2022: Banfield
- 2022–2024: Costa Rica (sporting director)
- 2023: Costa Rica (interim)
- 2024: Costa Rica (interim)

Claudio Alejandro Vivas (born 12 August 1968) is an Argentine professional football manager and former player who played as a goalkeeper. He last served as the interim manager of the Costa Rica national team.

== Coaching career ==
Vivas started his management career at Argentinos Juniors and he became famous by working as assistant of Marcelo Bielsa at the Argentina national team and at La Liga club Athletic Bilbao. In 2019 he became the manager of Bolivar, however in late 2020, was fired. In April 2021, Vivas became the head coach of Cusco FC of the Peruvian Primera División.

== Personal life ==
Vivas' older brother Marcelo is also a football manager.
