= Diego Osella =

Diego Osella may refer to:

- Diego Osella (basketball)
- Diego Osella (footballer)
