= Salomón Paredes =

Peruvian football manager (born 1965)

Personal information
- Full name: Salomón Wilfredo Paredes Vásquez
- Date of birth: 12 October 1965 (age 61)
- Place of birth: Pacasmayo, Peru
- Position: Midfielder

Senior career*
Years	Team	Apps	(Gls)
1979–1986	Los Espartanos		
1987–1994	Carlos A. Mannucci		
1995	Deportivo Municipal		
1996–1997	San Agustín		
1997	Sport Boys		

Managerial career
- Torbellino de Pacasmayo
- Unión Estudiantil
- Juventud Perú
- Atlético Medellín
- 2001: Carlos A. Mannucci
- 2008: Defensor Porvenir
- 2010: Sport Vallejo
- 2011–2013: Universidad César Vallejo (youth)
- 2014: Sport Vallejo
- 2015: Defensor Porvenir
- 2017: Torbellino de Pacasmayo
- 2019–2020: Carlos A. Mannucci (reserves)
- 2019: Carlos A. Mannucci (interim)
- 2021: Deportivo Llacuabamba
- 2022: Comerciantes Unidos
- 2023–2024: Carlos A. Mannucci (reserves)
- 2024: Carlos A. Mannucci (interim)
- 2024: Carlos A. Mannucci
- * Club domestic league appearances and goals

Salomón Wilfredo Paredes Vásquez (born 12 October 1965) is a Peruvian football manager and former player who played as a midfielder.

== Playing career ==
Born in Pacasmayo, Paredes began his career with hometown side Los Espartanos de Pacasmayo. He subsequently represented Carlos A. Mannucci, Deportivo Municipal, San Agustín and Sport Boys, retiring with the latter at the age of 31.

== Managerial career ==
After retiring, Paredes managed several sides in the lower leagues before returning to his main club Mannucci on 27 March 2019, as a manager of the reserve team. In May of that year, he was named interim manager of the main squad after José Soto left.

Ahead of the 2021 season, Paredes took over Peruvian Segunda División side Deportivo Llacuabamba, before moving to fellow league team Comerciantes Unidos in February 2022. He left the latter by mutual consent in July, and subsequently returned to Mannucci and their reserve side.

In April 2024, Paredes was again an interim of Mannucci after Franco Navarro left. He returned to his previous duties after the appointment of Milton Mendes, but was named manager of the club on 27 July, after Mendes also left.
