= Sebastián Gularte =

Uruguayan footballer (born 1990)

Personal information
- Full name: Gerardo Sebastián Gularte Fros
- Date of birth: 21 May 1990 (age 36)
- Place of birth: Tacuarembó, Uruguay
- Height: 1.80 m (5 ft 11 in)
- Position: Forward

Team information
- Current team: Deutscher

Youth career
- Tacuarembó

Senior career*
Years	Team	Apps	(Gls)
2009–2010	Tacuarembó	9	(0)
2010–2011	Deportivo Maldonado	4	(0)
2011	Deportes Savio	2	(0)
2012–2013	Tacuarembó	6	(2)
2014	Rampla Juniors	17	(13)
2014–2015	Montevideo Wanderers	17	(3)
2015–2016	San Marcos	19	(3)
2016	Progreso	11	(0)
2017	Deportivo Mictlán	20	(1)
2017	Miramar Misiones	11	(2)
2018	Tacuarembó	24	(13)
2019	Unión Comercio	29	(14)
2020	Binacional	16	(3)
2021	Nacional Potosí	29	(12)
2022	Atlético Bucaramanga	8	(0)
2022	Ayacucho	15	(4)
2023	Alvarado	15	(1)
2023–2025	Tacuarembó	26	(4)
2025	Kimberley	2	(0)
2025	Uruguay Montevideo	11	(2)
2026–	Deutscher	0	(0)
- * Club domestic league appearances and goals as of 19 March 2026

Gerardo Sebastián Gularte Fros (born 21 May 1990), known as Sebastián Gularte, is a Uruguayan footballer who plays for Uruguayan Primera División Amateur club Deutscher.

== Teams ==
- (Uruguay) Tacuarembó FC 2009–2010
- (Uruguay) Deportivo Maldonado 2010–2011
- (Honduras) Deportes Savio 2011
- (Uruguay) Tacuarembó FC 2012–2013
- (Uruguay) Rampla Juniors 2014
- (Uruguay) Montevideo Wanderers 2014–2015
- (Chile) San Marcos de Arica 2015–2016
- (Uruguay) Progreso 2016
- (Uruguay) Miramar Misiones 2017
- (Uruguay) Tacuarembó F.C. 2018
- (Peru) Unión Comercio 2019
- (Peru) Deportivo Binacional 2020
- (Bolivia) Nacional Potosí 2021
- (Colombia) Atlético Bucaramanga 2022
- (Argentina) Alvarado 2023
