= Diego Osella (footballer) =

Argentine footballer

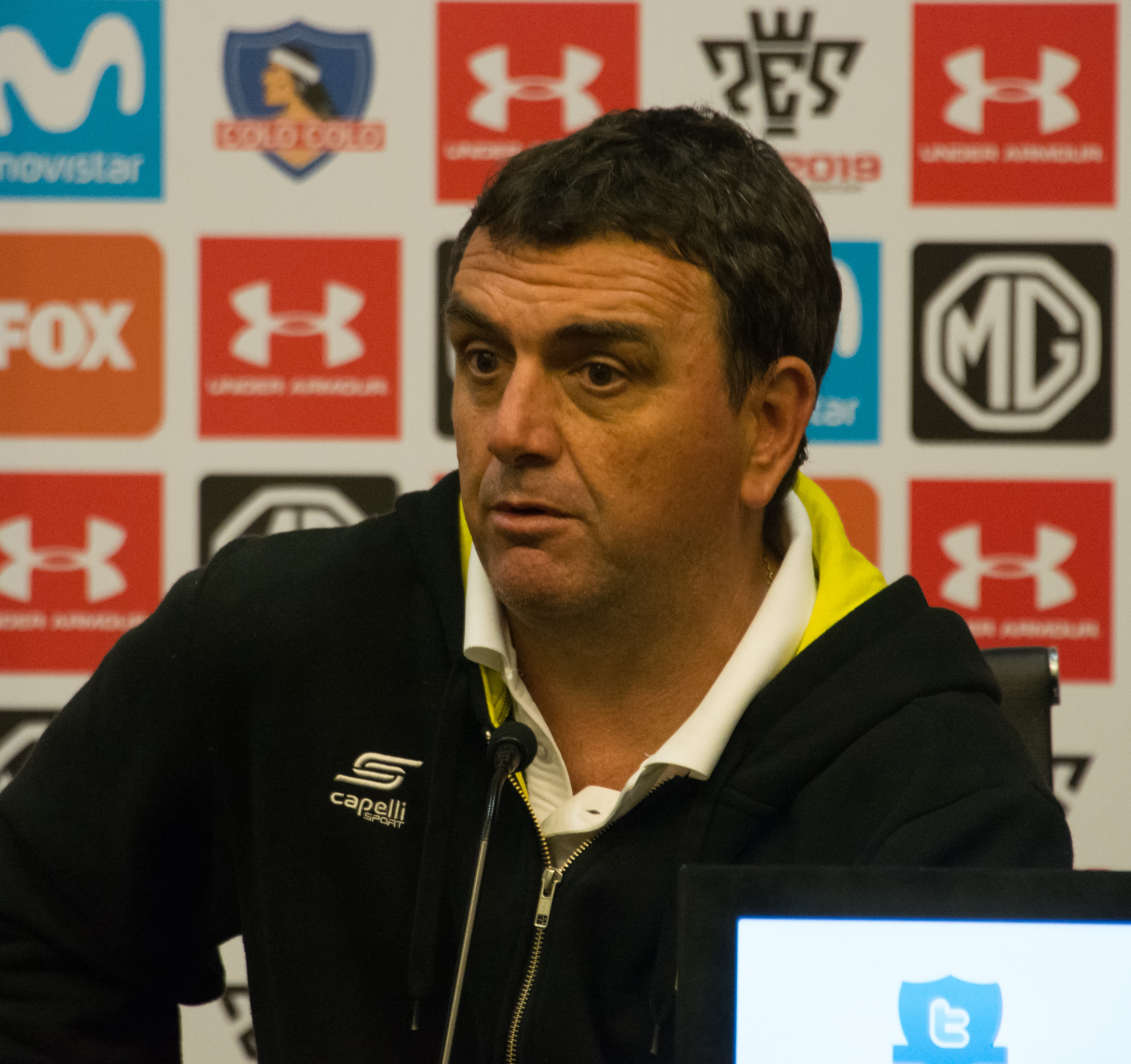
- Osella in 2018

Personal information
- Full name: Diego Mario Francisco Osella
- Date of birth: 19 July 1970 (age 56)
- Place of birth: Acebal, Argentina
- Height: 1.82 m (6 ft 0 in)
- Position: Centre-back

Senior career*
Years	Team	Apps	(Gls)
1993–1995	Newell's Old Boys	1	(0)
1994–1995	→ San Luis Potosí (loan)		
1996–1997	Almirante Brown (A)		
1997–1998	Central Córdoba de Rosario	36	(1)
1998–2001	Almirante Brown (A)	71	(5)
2001–2003	Tiro Federal	52	(3)
Total		160	(9)

Managerial career
- 2006: La Emilia
- 2006: Sportivo Las Parejas
- 2006–2008: La Emilia
- 2009–2010: San Luis de Quillota
- 2010: Tiro Federal
- 2010–2011: Everton Viña del Mar
- 2013: Patronato
- 2014: Colón
- 2015–2016: Olimpo
- 2016–2017: Newell's Old Boys
- 2018: San Luis de Quillota
- 2018–2019: Belgrano
- 2019: Melgar
- 2020: Colón
- 2021: Ferro Carril Oeste
- 2022: Agropecuario
- 2023: Chaco For Ever
- 2024: Chaco For Ever
- 2024: Colón
- 2026: Central Español
- * Club domestic league appearances and goals

Diego Mario Francisco Osella (born 19 July 1970 in Acebal, Santa Fe), is an Argentine football manager and former player who played as a centre-back.

== Honours ==
=== Manager ===
San Luis de Quillota

- Primera B de Chile: 2009 Clausura
