= 2019 Torneo de Promoción y Reservas =

Peruvian association football tournament

Torneo de Promoción y Reservas
- Season: 2019
- Champions: Sporting Cristal
- U-20 Copa Libertadores: Sporting Cristal

The Torneo de Promoción y Reservas was a football tournament in Peru. There are currently 18 clubs in the league. Each team will have a roster of twelve 21-year-old players, three 19-year-olds, and three older reinforcements; whenever they be recorded in the club. The tournament will offer the champion two bonus points and the runner-up one bonus point to the respective regular teams in the 2019 Liga 1.

== Teams ==
=== Stadia and locations ===
Locations of the 2019 Torneo de Promoción y Reserva teams

Team	City	Stadium	Capacity
Academia Cantolao	Callao	Miguel Grau	15,000
Alianza Lima	Lima	Alejandro Villanueva	35,000
Alianza Universidad	Huánuco	Heraclio Tapia	15,000
Ayacucho	Ayacucho	Ciudad de Cumaná	15,000
Binacional	Moquegua	25 de Noviembre	21,000
Carlos A. Mannucci	Trujillo	Mansiche	25,000
Deportivo Municipal	Lima	Miguel Grau	17,000
Melgar	Arequipa	Virgen de Chapi	60,000
Pirata	Chiclayo	Elías Aguirre	24,500
Real Garcilaso	Cusco	Garcilaso	42,056
Sport Boys	Callao	Miguel Grau	17,000
Sport Huancayo	Huancayo	Estadio Huancayo	20,000
Sporting Cristal	Lima	Alberto Gallardo	18,000
Unión Comercio	Nueva Cajamarca	IPD de Moyobamba	12,000
Universidad César Vallejo	Trujillo	Mansiche	25,000
Universidad San Martín	Lima	Alberto Gallardo	18,000
UTC	Cajamarca	Germán Contreras	6,300
Universitario	Lima	Monumental	80,093

== League table ==
=== Standings ===
Pos	Team	Pld	W	D	L	GF	GA	GD	Pts	Qualification
1	Sporting Cristal	34	23	5	6	86	32	+54	74	Bonus +2 to 2019 Liga 1
2	Sport Huancayo	34	21	9	4	48	21	+27	72	Bonus +1 to 2019 Liga 1
3	Alianza Lima	34	21	8	5	62	29	+33	71	
4	Universitario	34	19	9	6	70	28	+42	66	
5	Melgar	34	19	6	9	74	45	+29	63	
6	Academia Cantolao	34	16	5	13	69	47	+22	53	
7	Sport Boys	34	16	5	13	49	46	+3	53	
8	Universidad César Vallejo	34	15	5	14	76	69	+7	50	
9	Ayacucho	34	13	7	14	46	51	−5	46	
10	Universidad San Martín	34	11	9	14	66	57	+9	42	
11	Carlos A. Mannucci	34	12	4	18	48	67	−19	40	
12	Unión Comercio	34	11	6	17	47	62	−15	39	
13	Alianza Universidad	34	10	6	18	54	71	−17	36	
14	Deportivo Municipal	34	10	6	18	38	58	−20	36	
15	Pirata	34	7	12	15	43	56	−13	33	
16	Binacional	34	11	0	23	38	94	−56	33	
17	Real Garcilaso	34	7	8	19	31	64	−33	29	
18	UTC	34	6	6	22	33	81	−48	24	

First match(es) will be played: 15 February 2019. Source: ADFP
Rules for classification: 1) Points; 2) Goal difference; 3) Goals for; 4) Drawing of lots; 5) Play-off (only if needed to decide first place).
If two teams are tied in points for first place: 2) Play-off.

=== Results ===
Home \ Away	ALI	AUH	AYA	BIN	CAM	CAN	MUN	MEL	PIR	RGA	SBA	SHU	CRI	UCO	UCV	USM	UNI	UTC
Alianza Lima		2–1	1–0	8–0	2–1	4–3	1–0	0–2	4–1	3–0	2–0	0–0	1–2	3–0	1–0	2–1	0–1	6–1
Alianza Universidad	0–0		0–0	2–1	1–0	1–0	2–1	2–2	1–3	3–2	2–4	0–1	1–2	3–1	6–2	1–1	3–0	5–1
Ayacucho	2–3	2–0		1–3	0–0	1–0	3–0	3–3	3–0	4–1	2–2	2–1	1–0	2–1	4–1	2–2	3–1	3–1
Binacional	1–3	2–1	3–1		0–1	2–1	3–1	0–1	2–1	0–1	1–4	0–1	2–1	3–2	1–2	1–5	0–1	2–1
Carlos A. Mannucci	4–1	1–1	0–1	5–1		3–2	4–2	3–0	3–2	2–1	1–2	0–2	0–2	3–0	2–2	2–1	1–1	3–0
Academia Cantolao	1–2	2–0	4–0	8–1	6–2		1–2	0–2	5–2	2–0	2–0	0–1	2–1	1–1	3–2	1–1	2–1	2–0
Deportivo Municipal	0–1	2–1	1–0	2–0	2–0	0–3		1–4	1–1	0–0	2–2	0–2	1–4	3–0	4–1	0–3	1–2	1–0
Melgar	0–2	4–0	1–0	4–2	5–1	5–1	0–2		4–2	2–0	5–1	2–2	3–4	1–1	5–2	1–0	1–0	4–0
Pirata	1–1	2–1	0–1	3–0	2–1	2–3	1–0	1–1		0–1	1–2	0–0	0–3	4–1	3–2	1–1	0–2	0–1
Real Garcilaso	1–1	2–2	1–1	2–1	4–2	1–1	0–1	2–1	1–1		0–1	0–1	2–1	1–4	2–2	1–4	0–1	2–1
Sport Boys	0–0	3–0	2–1	0–3	1–0	2–1	2–0	2–1	1–0	3–0		1–0	1–2	1–2	0–3	0–0	0–2	0–0
Sport Huancayo	3–0	2–1	1–0	1–0	4–0	1–0	2–0	3–1	1–1	0–0	3–2		1–0	1–0	2–0	2–1	1–2	0–0
Sporting Cristal	1–1	4–1	7–0	8–0	1–0	2–2	3–1	0–0	1–0	6–2	1–0	0–0		7–0	1–1	3–2	0–2	6–0
Unión Comercio	0–3	4–2	2–1	5–0	0–2	1–2	3–0	1–2	2–2	2–0	1–0	2–2	0–1		3–2	4–4	0–0	2–1
Universidad César Vallejo	1–2	6–1	4–1	5–1	1–0	2–1	2–2	3–2	3–3	2–1	2–0	1–3	1–3	2–0		5–2	2–1	8–1
Universidad San Martín	0–1	5–1	3–0	2–0	9–0	0–4	2–2	0–2	1–1	2–0	2–4	3–1	2–4	1–0	1–3		1–3	1–1
Universitario	0–0	6–1	1–1	9–0	2–1	2–2	2–2	3–1	1–1	6–0	3–2	1–1	0–1	1–0	5–0	3–0		5–0
UTC	1–1	0–7	1–0	1–2	6–0	0–1	3–1	1–2	1–1	1–0	1–4	1–2	2–4	1–2	3–1	1–3	0–0	

Source: ADFP, Soccerway
Legend: Blue = home team win; Yellow = draw; Red = away team win.

== See also ==
- 2019 Liga 1
