= Independiente de Bigand =

Argentine football club

Independiente Football Club Mutual Social y Biblioteca is a small football club in Bigand, Santa Fe Province, Argentina.

The club was founded in 1919 by Italian immigrant Guglielmo Broglia as a dissident part of the already existing Sporting Club . It then quickly entered in the competitions of the local league called Liga Deportiva del Sur, and won the championships of 1932, 1933, 1940, 1941, 1944, 1950, 1955, 1957, 1958, 1959, 1960, 1962, 1963, 1964, 1977, 1999, 2023 and 2024. In sports terms, the most important achievement was the Provincial first place, in 1968, defeating Newell's Old Boys in the finals. The coach at that time was Angel Tulio Zof, later Argentine champion with Rosario Central.

During the 1950s the club obtained victories against important clubs like Rosario Central, Central Córdoba, Unión de Santa Fe and Newell's Old Boys. Nowadays, a lot of young players take their first steps into the sports with Independiente de Bigand, to later move ahead to important clubs of Rosario, such as Fabián Fabiani.

Other sports practiced in the club are basketball (with player Miguel Basso), artistic ice-skating (Anibal Frare obtained the world second place) and swimming, with an Olympic pool copied from Independiente de Avellaneda.

During the 1978 FIFA World Cup that took place in Argentina, the club installations served as hotel and training camp for the Italy national football team.
