= Karlo Calcina =

Peruvian footballer (born 1984)

Personal information
- Full name: Karlo Calcina Zúñiga
- Date of birth: 3 March 1984 (age 42)
- Place of birth: Arequipa, Peru
- Height: 1.76 m (5 ft 9 in)
- Position: Midfielder

Youth career
- Sporting Cristal

Senior career*
Years	Team	Apps	(Gls)
2004–2005	Atlético Universidad	73	(4)
2006–2008	Melgar	34	(0)
2009	Cobresol	17	(1)
2010–2013	Melgar	94	(5)
2014	José Gálvez FBC	9	(0)
2014	San Simón	6	(0)

International career
2001	Peru U17		

Managerial career
- 2017: FBC Aurora (assistant coach)
- 2017–: FBC Melgar U17
- 2019: FBC Melgar
- 2019–: FBC Melgar (assistant)
- * Club domestic league appearances and goals

Karlo Calcina Zúñiga (born 3 March 1984) is a Peruvian former professional footballer who played as a midfielder.

== Club career ==
Karlo Calcina developed as a footballer in Sporting Cristal. Later his debut in the Torneo Descentralizado came in 2004 with Atlético Universidad. He also scored his first goal in the top-flight in the 4–1 home win over Cienciano for round 22 of the Clausura.

He joined FBC Melgar in January 2006 for his first spell with club.

== International career ==
Calcina played for the Peru U17 side making his debut in a 1–1 draw against Argentina in 2001.
