= Jean Pierre Archimbaud =

Peruvian footballer (born 1994)

Personal information
- Full name: Jean Pierre Archimbaud Arriarán
- Date of birth: 16 August 1994 (age 32)
- Place of birth: Lima, Peru
- Height: 1.81 m (5 ft 11 in)
- Position: Midfielder

Team information
- Current team: Alianza Lima
- Number: 17

Youth career
- Academia Cantolao
- Sporting Cristal
- Alianza Lima

Senior career*
| Years | Team | Apps | (Gls) |
| 2012–2016 | Alianza Lima | 0 | (0) |
| 2014 | → UTC Cajamarca (loan) | 11 | (0) |
| 2015 | → Deportivo Coopsol (loan) | 21 | (0) |
| 2016 | → Ayacucho (loan) | 23 | (0) |
| 2017 | Juan Aurich | 40 | (8) |
| 2018–2019 | Real Garcilaso | 60 | (7) |
| 2020–2021 | Deportivo Municipal | 41 | (3) |
| 2022–2024 | Melgar | 96 | (15) |
| 2025– | Alianza Lima | 14 | (0) |

International career^{‡}
| 2024 | Peru | 3 | (0) |
- * Club domestic league appearances and goals as of 22 March 2026 ‡ National team caps and goals as of 11 October 2024

Jean Pierre Archimbaud Arriarán (born 16 August 1994) is a Peruvian footballer who plays as a midfielder for Alianza Lima.

He has made over 250 Peruvian Primera División appearances for UTC Cajamarca, Ayacucho, Juan Aurich, Real Garcilaso, Deportivo Municipal and Melgar. Having left Alianza at the start of his career without making a senior appearance, he returned for the 2025 season.

Archimbaud played three international games for Peru in 2024, aged 30.

== Club career ==
=== Early career ===
Born in Lima, Archimbaud began playing football aged 3 at Academia Cantolao under coach Dante Mandriotto. He then went on to Sporting Cristal and Alianza Lima.

In 2011, Archimbaud won the Torneo de Promoción y Reserva with Alianza. His only call-up to the first team was on 18 February 2012 on the first day of the Peruvian Primera División season; he was an unused substitute in a 2–2 home draw with León de Huánuco with both teams fielding youth players due to a players' strike.

On 17 January 2014, Archimbaud was loaned to UTC Cajamarca. After further loans to second-tier Deportivo Coopsol and Ayacucho, he signed for Juan Aurich in January 2017. He scored his first eight goals for the club, before transferring to Real Garcilaso for the new season.

For 2020, Archimbaud signed for Deportivo Municipal, earning himself a contract for a second year. He left in November 2021.

=== Melgar ===
Archimbaud signed for Melgar for 2022. On 12 March, he scored the only goal of a home win over Alianza. He scored his first continental goal on 3 May, an added-time strike to give his ten-man side a 2–1 win away to River Plate Montevideo in the Copa Sudamericana group stage. His team won the Apertura title for winning the first half of the season, eventually finishing the entire campaign as runners-up to Alianza.

Archimbaud signed a new contract in December 2023 for a third year at the club from Arequipa, in which he scored a career-best 12 goals.

=== Return to Alianza ===
On 3 December 2024, over a decade after leaving Alianza, Archimbaud returned there on the expiration of his Melgar contract. He signed a two-year deal with the option of a third.

== International career ==
In late August 2024, following his 30th birthday, Archimbaud had his first call-up to the Peru national team, for 2026 FIFA World Cup qualifiers against neighbours Colombia and Ecuador. He made his debut on 6 September against the former at the National Stadium of Peru, playing the final eight minutes.

== Personal life ==
Archimbaud, known as "Chocherita", was one of four sons of journalist Lalo Archimbaud.

== Career statistics ==
=== Club ===
As of match played 3 November 2024

Appearances and goals by club, season and competition
| Club | Season | League | | | Cup | | Continental | | Total | |
| Club | Season | Division | Apps | Goals | Apps | Goals | Apps | Goals | Apps | Goals |
|---|---|---|---|---|---|---|---|---|---|---|
| UTC Cajamarca (loan) | 2014 | Torneo Descentralizado | 11 | 0 | 0 | 0 | 2 | 0 | 13 | 0 |
| Deportivo Coopsol (loan) | 2015 | Segunda División | 21 | 0 | — | | — | | 21 | 0 |
| Ayacucho (loan) | 2016 | Torneo Descentralizado | 23 | 0 | — | | — | | 23 | 0 |
| Juan Aurich | 2017 | Torneo Descentralizado | 40 | 8 | — | | 2 | 0 | 42 | 8 |
| Real Garcilaso | 2018 | Torneo Descentralizado | 36 | 4 | — | | 6 | 0 | 42 | 4 |
| Real Garcilaso | 2019 | Torneo Descentralizado | 23 | 3 | 2 | 0 | 2 | 0 | 27 | 3 |
| Real Garcilaso | Total | | 59 | 7 | 2 | 0 | 8 | 0 | 69 | 7 |
| Deportivo Municipal | 2020 | Liga 1 | 24 | 3 | — | | — | | 24 | 3 |
| Deportivo Municipal | 2021 | Liga 1 | 17 | 0 | 1 | 0 | — | | 18 | 0 |
| Deportivo Municipal | Total | | 41 | 3 | 1 | 0 | 0 | 0 | 42 | 3 |
| Melgar | 2022 | Liga 1 | 34 | 3 | — | | 8 | 2 | 42 | 5 |
| Melgar | 2023 | Liga 1 | 33 | 0 | — | | 6 | 0 | 39 | 0 |
| Melgar | 2024 | Liga 1 | 29 | 12 | — | | 1 | 0 | 30 | 12 |
| Melgar | Total | | 96 | 15 | 0 | 0 | 15 | 2 | 111 | 17 |
| Career total | | | 291 | 33 | 3 | 0 | 27 | 2 | 321 | 35 |

=== International ===
As of match played 11 October 2024

Appearances and goals by national team and year
| National team | Year | Apps | Goals |
|---|---|---|---|
| Peru | 2024 | 3 | 0 |
| Total | | 3 | 0 |

== Honours ==
Alianza Lima

- Torneo de Promoción y Reserva: 2011

Melgar

- Peruvian Primera División: 2022 (Apertura)
