= Marco Valencia =

Peruvian football manager (born 1961)

Personal information
- Full name: Marco Antonio Valencia Pacheco
- Date of birth: 1 August 1971 (age 55)
- Place of birth: Camaná, Peru
- Height: 1.81 m (5 ft 11 in)
- Position: Midfielder

Team information
- Current team: Melgar (youth manager)

Senior career*
Years	Team	Apps	(Gls)
1989	Deportivo Camaná		
1990–1994	Alianza Lima	70	(29)
1995	Deportivo Sipesa	41	(5)
1996–1997	Alianza Lima	47	(11)
1998	Melgar	38	(2)
1999	Sporting Cristal	21	(2)
2000	Alianza Lima	2	(0)
2000–2003	Melgar	87	(11)
2004	Atlético Universidad	11	(0)
Total		311	(60)

International career
1993	Peru	5	(0)

Managerial career
- 2019–2024: Melgar (youth)
- 2019: Melgar (interim)
- 2020: Melgar (interim)
- 2023: Melgar (interim)
- 2024: Melgar (interim)
- 2024: Melgar
- 2025–: Melgar (youth)
- * Club domestic league appearances and goals

Wilmar Elar Valencia Pacheco (born 27 October 1961) is a Peruvian football manager and former player who played as a central defender. He is the current manager of Melgar's youth sides.

== Club career ==
Born Camaná, Valencia started playing for local side Deportivo Camaná before moving to Alianza Lima with his brother in 1990. Both left in 1994, with his brother retiring and him signing for Deportivo Sipesa.

Valencia returned to Alianza in 1996, but signed for Melgar ahead of the 1998 season. Regularly used, he represented Sporting Cristal before returning to Alianza Lima in 2000, where he was rarely used before returning to Melgar later in that year.

In 2004, after a spell at Atlético Universidad, Valencia retired at the age of 33.

== International career ==
Valencia made his debut for the Peru national team on 27 January 1993, in a 1–1 friendly draw against Honduras. He would feature in four more matches for the nation during the year.

== Managerial career ==
In January 2019, Valencia returned to Melgar to work as a youth manager. On 28 October of that year, he was appointed manager of the main squad until the end of the season, replacing sacked Diego Osella.

Back to his previous role in December 2019 after the appointment of Carlos Bustos, but was again named interim on 24 September 2020, after Bustos was sacked. He again left in November after the campaign ended, and continued to work with the youth sides.

Valencia was also an interim manager of Melgar for one match in March 2023, between Argentines Pablo Lavallén and Mariano Soso. He became an interim manager of the club for a fourth spell on 3 March 2024, replacing another Argentine, Pablo De Muner, and was later permanently appointed manager of the side for the entire Clausura tournament on 28 May.

On 7 November 2024, Valencia returned to his previous role as manager of Melgar's youth sides.

== Personal life ==
Valencia's older brother Wilmar was also a footballer (a centre-back who also played for Alianza and the national team) and manager.
