= Bernardo Cuesta =

Argentine footballer

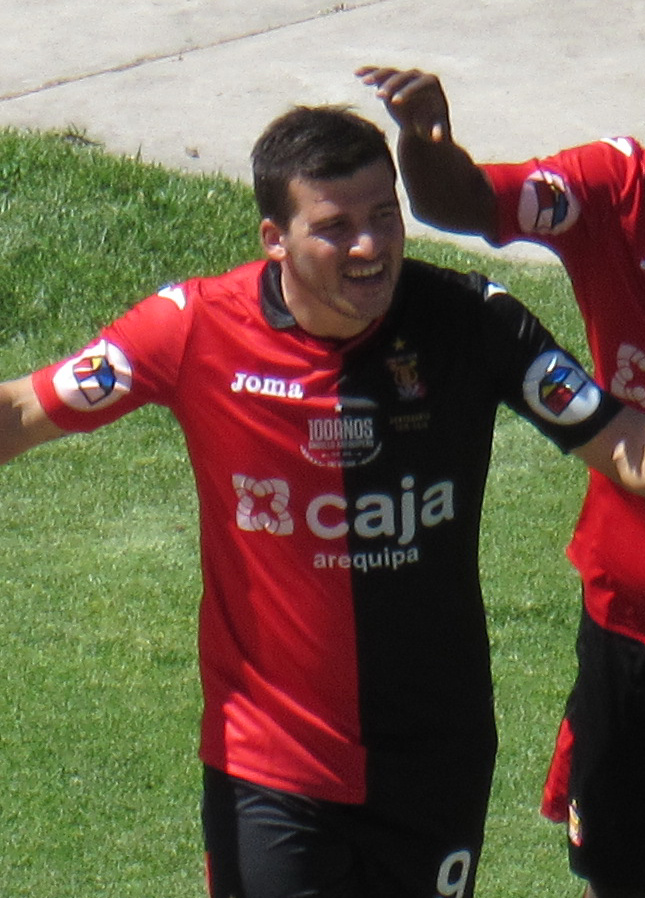
- Cuesta with Melgar in 2015

Personal information
- Full name: Bernardo Nicolás Cuesta Veratrini
- Date of birth: 20 December 1988 (age 37)
- Place of birth: Álvarez, Argentina
- Height: 1.71 m (5 ft 7 in)
- Position: Forward

Team information
- Current team: FBC Melgar
- Number: 9

Youth career
- 2005–2007: Tiro Federal

Senior career*
| Years | Team | Apps | (Gls) |
| 2008–2012 | Tiro Federal | 38 | (7) |
| 2012–2016 | FBC Melgar | 145 | (70) |
| 2015 | → The Strongest (loan) | 13 | (3) |
| 2017 | Atlético Junior | 13 | (1) |
| 2017 | Huachipato | 6 | (0) |
| 2018–2019 | FBC Melgar | 60 | (40) |
| 2020 | Buriram United | 4 | (0) |
| 2020 | Puebla | 12 | (1) |
| 2021– | FBC Melgar | 159 | (74) |
- * Club domestic league appearances and goals as of 13 November 2026

Bernardo Nicolás Cuesta Veratrini (born 20 December 1988) is an Argentine professional footballer who plays for Peruvian Liga 1 club FBC Melgar.

== Career ==
On 19 December 2019, it was confirmed that Cuesta would join the Thai league club Buriram United for the 2020 season. On February 15, 2026, Cuesta became FBC Melgar's all-time leading scorer with 198 goals, surpassing the previous record held by Eduardo Márquez by one.

Playing for FBC Melgar, Cuesta became the Peruvian champion in 2015—a year that also marked the club's centenary. Furthermore, he achieved notable individual success, including finishing as the top scorer in the 2019 league season (with 27 goals) and the top scorer in the 2022 Copa Sudamericana (with 8 goals).

== Personal life ==
Cuesta got Peruvian nationality by residence in March 2023.

== Honours ==
FBC Melgar

- Peruvian Primera División: 2015
- Torneo Clausura 2018
- Torneo Apertura 2022

Atlético Junior

- Copa Colombia: 2017

Individual

- FBC Melgar all-time top scorer: 211 goals (as of November 17, 2026)
- 2019 Liga 1 top scorer: 27 goals
- 2022 Copa Sudamericana top scorer: 8 goals
