= List of Club Universitario de Deportes players =

Throughout its 100-year history, a large number of Soccer Players from the Universitario de Deportes have worn the first team jersey and many of them have represented Peru on their national soccer team. Teodoro Fernández is the maximum idol of the institution, as well as its historical scorer with 156 goals. He is considered one of the best soccer players in the history of Peru.

When Teodoro Fernández began to think about his retirement, the soccer player Alberto Terry was the one who succeeded him and managed to win the appreciation of the club's fans.

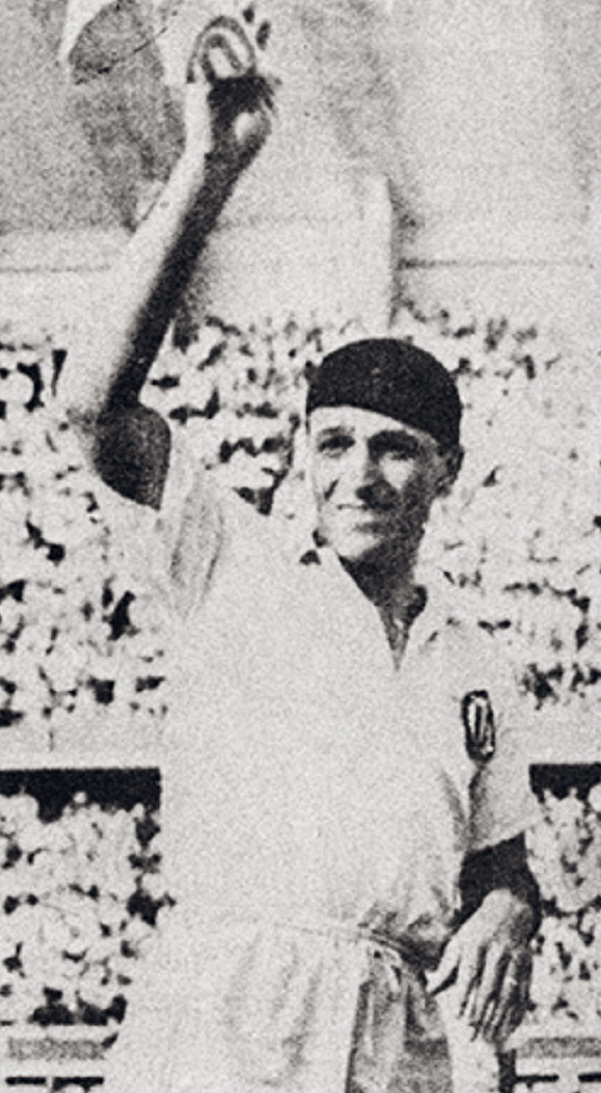
Teodoro Fernández is the maximum idol of the club

This article lists footballers who currently are or have previously played for Peruvian football (soccer) team Universitario de Deportes.

== List of players ==
Name	Nat	Pos	Club Universitario career	Apps	Goals
Mario de las Casas	(Peru)	Defender	1928–1929	—	—
Rafael Quirós	(Peru)	Defender	1929–1935	—	—
Alberto Denegri	(Peru)	Midfielder	1929–1935	—	—
Eduardo Astengo	(Peru)	Defender	1928–1934	—	—
Carlos Cillóniz	(Peru)	Forward	1928–1934	—	—
Luis de Souza Ferreira	(Peru)	Forward	1926–1934	—	—
Jorge Góngora	(Peru)	Midfielder	1924–1936	—	—
Plácido Galindo	(Peru)	Forward	1928–1931	—	—
Pablo Pacheco	(Peru)	Forward	1928–1932	—	—
Juan Criado	(Peru)	Goalkeeper	1922–1935	—	—
Arturo Fernández	(Peru)	Defender	1930–1940	—	—
Teodoro Fernández	(Peru)	Forward	1931–1953	180	184
Orestes Jordán	(Peru)	Defender	1934–1944	—	—
Carlos Tovar	(Peru)	Midfielder	1932–1943	—	—
Juan Honores	(Peru)	Goalkeeper	1935–1940	—	—
Enrique Perales	(Peru)	Defender	1938–1940	—	—
César Socarraz	(Peru)	Forward	1930–1940	—	—
Segundo Castillo	(Peru)	Midfielder	1948–1949; 1951–1952	—	—
Jacinto Villalba	(Peru)	Forward	1945; 1955–1961	—	—
Andrés da Silva	(Peru)	Defender	1944-1955	155	—
Eduardo Fernández Meyzán	(Peru)	Forward	1939–1946; 1950–1951	—	—
Walter Ormeño	(Peru)	Goalkeeper	1946–1949	—	—
Pablo Pasache	(Peru)	Midfielder	1945-1946	—	—
Jorge Alcalde	(Peru)	Forward	1948-1951	37	28
Alberto Terry	(Peru)	Midfielder	1947-1958	210	115
Carlos Valdivia	(Peru)	Midfielder	1949; 1951-1953	—	—
John Galliquio	(Peru)	Defender	2000-2001; 2002; 2004–2005; 2007; 2009–2013; 2016–2017	310	11
Edson Dominguez	(Peru)	Defender	1995-2004	289	8
José Carvallo	(Peru)	Goalkeeper	2003–2009; 2013–2015; 2019–	266	
Antonio Gonzalez	(Peru)	Midfielder	2006-2015	264	0
Gregorio Bernales	(Peru)	Midfielder	1999-2002; 2004–2007; 2008	262	26
Óscar Ibáñez	(Argentina)	Goalkeeper	1996–2002; 2008	255	0
Piero Alva	(Peru)	Forward	1998-2000; 2004–2007; 2009–2011	236	78
Rainer Torres	(Peru)	Midfielder	2003; 2008–2014	218	9
Luis Guadalupe	(Peru)	Defender	1995–1999; 2000; 2003–2007	215	9
Fernando Del Solar	(Peru)	Midfielder	1995-1996; 1998–2004	197	12
Raúl Fernández	(Peru)	Goalkeeper	2005–2006; 2007–2010; 2011; 2015–2018	197	—
Paolo Maldonado	(Peru)	Midfielder	1993–1997; 1999–2000; 2004; 2006	196	23
Néstor Duarte	(Peru)	Defender	2007–2015	211	2
Miguel Ángel Torres	(Peru)	Midfielder	2000–2002; 2007–2014	137	6
José Pereda	(Peru)	Midfielder	1991–1994; 1996–1998; 2002; 2004–2006	191	7
Giuliano Portilla	(Peru)	Defender	1995–2001; 2003	186	11
Alberto Quintero	(Panama)	Forward	2017–2022	161	32
Ángel Elías Romero	(Peru)	Midfielder	2010–2018	173	4
Raúl Ruidíaz	(Peru)	Forward	2009–2011; 2013–2014; 2015–2016	178	80
Oswaldo Ramírez	(Peru)	Forward	1970–1975	131	80
Diego Chávez	(Peru)	Defender	2012–2017; 2020–2021	164	2
Jorge Araujo	(Peru)	Defender	1998–2001; 2008	169	5
Juan Flores	(Peru)	Goalkeeper	1999–2001; 2003–2006	162	
Jesús Rabanal	(Peru)	Defender	2004–2011	161	6
Miguel Cevasco	(Peru)	Midfielder	2004–2008	151	3
José Adolfo Mendoza	(Peru)	Defender	2003–2006; 2011	156	2
Carlos Galván	(Argentina)	Defender	2007–2011	150	8
Juan Pajuelo	(Peru)	Defender	1997–2000; 2003–2004	152	5
Nelinho Quina	(Peru)	Defender	2008; 2009; 2020–2022	146	10
Horacio Benincasa	(Argentina)	Defender	2015–2018	133	8
Emanuel Paucar	(Peru)	Midfielder	2015–2019	127	0
Roberto Farfán	(Peru)	Forward	1997–1998; 1999; 2004–2005	121	37
Donny Neyra	(Peru)	Midfielder	2005–2008	153	27
Marko Ciurlizza	(Peru)	Midfielder	1996–2000	141	3
Juan Manuel Vargas	(Peru)	Defender	2002–2004; 2017–2018	116	15
Jersson Vásquez	(Peru)	Defender	2017–2019	109	15

== All Time XI ==
- Dimas Zegarra (1953–1968)
- Carlos Tovar (1932–1943)
- Héctor Chumpitaz (1966–1975)
- Arturo Fernández (1930–1940)
- Nicolás Fuentes (1964–1972)
- Roberto Challe (1966–1972; 1977–1978)
- Jose Cevallos Castro (1980–1983)
- Percy Rojas (1967–1975; 1982–1984)
- José Luis Carranza (1985–2005)
- Alberto “Toto” Terry (1946–1958)
- Teodoro “Lolo” Fernández (1931–1953)
- Juan Carlos Oblitas (1969–1974; 1984–1985)

== Noted Players ==
Peru

- (Peru) Teodoro "Lolo" Fernández
- (Peru) Alberto "Toto" Terry
- (Peru) Socrates Enrique Strat Hoyos
- (Peru) Héctor Chumpitaz
- (Peru) Germán Leguía
- (Peru) James Fernando Barrueto
- (Peru) Luis Cruzado
- (Peru) Arturo Fernández
- (Peru) José Fernández
- (Peru) Daniel Ruiz
- (Peru) César Socarraz
- (Peru) Segundo Castillo
- (Peru) Juan Carlos Oblitas
- (Peru) Roberto Martínez
- (Peru) José Guillermo Del Solar
- (Peru) Eduardo Malásquez
- (Peru) Luis La Fuente
- (Peru) Roberto Challe
- (Peru) Juan Reynoso
- (Peru) Óscar Ibáñez
- (Peru) Luis Guadalupe
- (Peru) Andrés Gonzalez
- (Peru) Eduardo Rey Muñoz
- (Peru) Fidel Suárez
- (Peru) José Carranza
- (Peru) Ronald Baroni
- (Peru) Nolberto Solano
- (Peru) Ángel Uribe
- (Peru) Alfonso Yañez
- (Peru) Martín Rodríguez
- (Peru) Freddy Ternero
- (Peru) Jaime Drago
- (Peru) Juan José Oré
- (Peru) Hugo Gastulo
- (Peru) Víctor Calatayud
- (Peru) Samuel Eugenio
- (Peru) Ismael Soria
- (Peru) Jorge Góngora
- (Peru) Javier Chirinos
- (Peru) Leonardo Rojas
- (Peru) Luis Reyna
- (Peru) Carlos Burella
- (Peru) Enrique Rodríguez Piña

Uruguay

- (Uruguay) Luis Celabe
- (Uruguay) Ruben Techera
- (Uruguay) Diego Guastavino
- (Uruguay) Tomás Silva

Honduras

- (Honduras) Eugenio Dolmo Flores

Brazil

- (Brazil) Alex Rossi
- (Brazil) Eduardo Esidio

Chile

- (Chile) Cristián Álvarez
- (Chile) Juan Carlos Letelier

Colombia

- (Colombia) Mayer Candelo
- (Colombia) Héctor Hurtado
- (Peru) Nicolás Fuentes
- (Peru) Percy Rojas
- (Peru) Juan Carlos Bazalar
- (Peru) Oswaldo Ramírez
- (Peru) Héctor Bailetti
- (Peru) Manuel Francisco Barreto
- (Peru) Luis Rubiños
- (Peru) Fernando Cuellar
- (Peru) Carlos Carbonell
- (Peru) Juan José Muñante
- (Peru) Hernán Rengifo
- (Peru) Humberto Horacio Ballesteros
- (Peru) Cesar Chávez-Riva
- (Peru) Víctor Lobatón
- (Peru) Dimas Zegarra
- (Peru) Enrique Casaretto
- (Peru) Rubén Toribio Díaz
- (Peru) Eleazar Soria
- (Peru) César Charún
- (Peru) John Galliquio
- (Peru) Rubén Correa
- (Peru) Percy Vílchez
- (Peru) Eusebio Acasuzo
- (Peru) Marko Ciurlizza
- (Peru) Juan Pajuelo
- (Peru) Giuliano Portilla
- (Peru) Paolo Maldonado
- (Peru) Julio Rivera
- (Peru) Carlos Orejuela
- (Peru) Fernando del Solar
- (Peru) Santiago Acasiete
- (Peru) Juan Cominges
- (Peru) Piero Alva
- (Peru) Gregorio Bernales
- (Peru) Johan Fano
- (Peru) Juan Manuel Vargas
- (Peru) José Carvallo
- (Peru) Miguel Cevasco

Paraguay

- (Paraguay) Darío Caballero
- (Paraguay) Jorge Amado Nunes
- (Paraguay) Miguel Angel Benítez
- (Paraguay) Gabriel González

Argentina

- (Argentina) Marcelo Asteggiano
- (Argentina) Martin Vilallonga
- (Argentina) Gustavo Grondona
- (Argentina) Mauro Cantoro
- (Argentina) Beto Carranza
- (Argentina) Óscar Ibáñez
- (Argentina) Adrián Coria
- (Argentina) Adrian Czornomaz
- (Argentina) Gastón Sangoy
- (Argentina) Juan Carlos Zubczuk
- (Argentina) Rafael Maceratesi
- (Argentina) Carlos Galván
- (Argentina) Juan Manuel Azconzábal
- (Argentina) Gustavo Falaschi
- (Argentina) Fernando Alloco

== Retired numbers ==
- 9 – (Peru) Teodoro "Lolo" Fernández, forward (1930–53) – Number retired since the 2013 season.
- 22 – (Peru) José Luis Carranza, midfielder (1986–04)

== Current squad 2023 ==
As of 10 March 2023

Note: Flags indicate national team as defined under FIFA eligibility rules; some limited exceptions apply. Players may hold more than one non-FIFA nationality.

No.	Pos.	Nation	Player
1	GK	PER	José Carvallo
2	DF	PER	Marco Saravia
3	DF	PAR	Williams Riveros (on loan from Barcelona S.C.)
4	MF	PER	Alfonso Barco
5	DF	ARG	Matías Di Benedetto
6	DF	PER	José Luján
7	FW	PER	Alexander Succar
8	MF	PER	Jordan Guivin
10	MF	PER	Horacio Calcaterra
11	FW	PER	Luis Urruti
12	GK	PER	Aamet Calderón
14	DF	PER	José Bolívar
15	FW	ARG	Emanuel Herrera
16	MF	ARG	Martín Pérez Guedes
17	FW	PER	José Rivera
18	MF	CHI	Rodrigo Ureña

No.	Pos.	Nation	Player
20	FW	PER	Alex Valera
21	GK	PER	Diego Romero
23	MF	PER	Jorge Murrugarra
24	FW	PER	Andy Polo
25	FW	PER	Roberto Siucho
26	DF	PER	Hugo Ancajima
27	DF	PER	Nelson Cabanillas
29	DF	PER	Aldo Corzo (captain)
30	DF	PER	Piero Guzmán
31	DF	PER	Jerry Navarro
32	FW	PER	José López
34	GK	PER	Alejandro Alcalá
35	MF	PER	Josué Oré
36	MF	PER	Piero Quispe
77	MF	PER	Yuriel Celi (on loan from Hull City)
