= 2008 Club Universitario de Deportes season =

Universitario de Deportes
2008 season
- Chairman: (Peru) Gino Pinasco
- Manager: (Argentina) Ricardo Gareca
- Torneo Descentralizad: Runners-up
- Top goalscorer: League: Hurtado (16); Neyra (16); All: Hurtado (16); Neyra (16)
Home colours	Away colours

This article shows statistics of the club's players in the season, and also lists all matches that the club played in the 2008 season.

== Players ==
Summer and winter transfers correspond to Southern Hemisphere seasons.

=== Squad information ===
The following table shows only appearances and goals made this season.

N	Pos.	Nat.	Name	Age	Since	App	Goals	Ends	Transfer fee	Notes
1	GK	(Peru)	Fernández	40	2007	44	0		Youth system	
2	DF	(Peru)	Molina	40	2006	9	0		Youth system	
3	MF	(Peru)	Neyra	42	2005	46	12		$ 0.4m	
4	DF	(Argentina)	Galván	52	2007	32	3		$1.2m	
5	MF	(Peru)	Gonzales	40	2006	38	0		Youth system	
6	MF	(Peru)	Rainer	46	2008	29	2		$ 1m	
7	MF	(Peru)	Miguel Angel	44	2007	36	2	ys	Youth system	
8	MF	(Peru)	Quina	39	2008	2	0			
9	FW	(Peru)	Jiménez	43	2008	30	12		$ 1m	
10	MF	(Colombia)	Candelo	49	2006	31	6		$ 1.4m	
11	FW	(Peru)	Labarthe	42	2008	21	3		$ 0.6m	
12	GK	(Peru)	Llontop	41	2006	0	0		Youth system	
13	DF	(Peru)	Calderón	36	2007	1	0		Youth system	
14	DF	(Peru)	Araujo	46	2008	38	1		$ 0.5m	
15	MF	(Peru)	Cevasco	39	2004	15	0		Youth system	
16	FW	(Argentina)	Perillo		2008	2	0		Free	
17	MF	(Peru)	Carmona	41	2008	7	1			
18	FW	(Colombia)	Hurtado	51	2007	42	15		$ 1m	
19	MF	(Peru)	Vásquez	42	2008	11	0			
21	GK	(Peru) (Argentina)	Ibañez	59	2008	3	0		Free	
23	DF	(Peru)	Duarte	36	2007	34	0		Youth system	
24	MF	(Peru)	Landauri	40	2008	26	0		$ 0.5m	
25	MF	(Peru)	Ramírez	41	2008	13	1			
26	DF	(Peru)	Balta	40	2006	27	0		Youth system	
27	MF	(Peru)	Correa	36						
28	MF	(Peru)	Rabanal	41	2005	44	2		Free	
29	MF	(Peru)	Bernales	49	2008	31	0		Free	
30	DF	(Peru)	John Fajardo		2007	1	0		Youth system	
	FW	(Peru)	Ávila	17	2008	4	0		Youth system	
	MF	(Peru)	Robert Ardiles		2008	3	0		Youth system	
	MF	(Peru)	Pablo Oré		2008	1	0		Youth system	
	MF	(Peru)	V. Zapata		2008					
	MF	(Peru)	Tragodara							
	MF	(Peru)	Rivas	41						
	FW	(Peru)	Curiel	38						

- Last updated: 4 November 2008
- Source: Universitario Plantilla
- Ordered by Jersey number.

=== In/out ===
==== In ====
No.	Pos.	Nat.	Name	Age	Moving from	Type	Transfer window	Ends	Transfer fee	Source
9	FW	(Peru)	Jiménez	43	San Lorenzo (Argentina)	Loan ✓	Summer	2009		
11	FW	(Peru)	Labarthe	42	Sport Boys	Transfer ✓	Summer			
14	DF	(Peru)	Araujo	46	Sport Boys	Transfer ✓	Summer			
25	MF	(Peru)	V. Zapata		Sport Boys	Transfer ✓	Summer	2008		
24	MF	(Peru)	Landauri	40	Sport Boys	Transfer ✓	Summer			
6	MF	(Peru)	R. Torres	46	Sporting Cristal	Transfer ✓	Summer			
29	MF	(Peru)	Bernales	49	Total Clean	Loan return ✓	Summer			
8	MF	(Peru)	Quina	39	Alianza Atlético	Transfer ✓	Winter			
17	MF	(Peru)	Carmona	41	Alianza Atlético	Transfer ✓	Winter			
19	MF	(Peru)	Johan Vásquez	42	Coronel Bolognesi	Transfer ✓	Winter			
25	MF	(Peru)	Ramírez	41	Coronel Bolognesi	Transfer ✓	Winter			
—	FW	(Peru)	La Torre	36	Sport Boys	Transfer ✓	Winter			
16	FW	(Argentina)	Perillo	41		Free	Winter	2009		

==== Out ====
No.	Pos.	Nat.	Name	Age	Moving to	Type	Transfer window	Transfer fee	Source
24	MF	(Peru)	Rivas	41	Górnik Zabrze (Poland)	Transfer ✓	Winter		
25	MF	(Peru)	V. Zapata		Alianza Atlético	Transfer ✓	Winter		
17	MF	(Peru)	Tragodara	40	Atlético Minero	Loaned out ✓	Winter		
27	MF	(Peru)	Correa	36	Melgar	Loaned out ✓	Winter		
—	FW	(Peru)	Curiel	38	Alianza Atlético	Transfer ✓	Winter		

Last updated: 2008-09-01

== Goalscorers ==
Pos	Player	Position	Goals
1	(Colombia) Héctor Hurtado	FW	16
1	(Peru) Donny Neyra	MF	16
3	(Peru) Roberto Jiménez	FW	15
4	(Colombia) Mayer Candelo	MF	6
5	(Peru) Gianfranco Labarthe Tome	FW	3
5	(Argentina) Carlos Galván	DF	3
7	(Peru) Jesús Rabanal	DF	2
7	(Peru) Rainer Torres	MF	2
7	(Peru) Miguel Angel Torres	MF	2
7	(Peru) Giancarlo Carmona	MF	2
11	(Peru) Julio Landauri	MF	1
11	(Peru) Willy Rivas	MF	1
11	(Peru) Jorge Araujo	DF	1
11	(Peru) Luis Ramírez	MF	1

== Matches ==
=== Competitive ===
==== Copa Sudamericana ====
30 July 2008 Preliminary	Universitario (Peru)	0 – 0	(Ecuador) Deportivo Quito	Lima, Peru
19:15 (UTC-5)		Report		Stadium: Monumental; Referee: José Buitrago (Colombia)

6 August 2008 Preliminary	Deportivo Quito (Ecuador)	2 – 1	(Peru) Universitario	Quito, Ecuador
17:00 (UTC-5)	Donoso 38' (pen.), 58'	Report	Nazareno 78' (o.g.)	Stadium: Estadio Olímpico Atahualpa; Referee: Wilmar Rondán (Colombia)

==== Torneo Descentralizado ====
===== Torneo Apertura =====
16 February 2008 Round 1	Universitario	1 – 1	Universidad de San Martín	Lima, Peru
	Silva 90+3'	Report	Jiménez 90+4'	Stadium: Estadio Monumental "U"; Referee: Hugo Rivera

20 February 2008 Round 2	José Gálvez	0 – 1	Universitario	Chimbote, Peru
		Report	Hurtado 28'	Stadium: Estadio Manuel Rivera Sanchez; Referee: Robert Rafael

24 February 2008 Round 3	Juan Aurich	1 – 1	Universitario	Chiclayo, Peru
	Moisela 74'	Report	Hurtado 35'	Stadium: Estadio Elías Aguirre

1 March 2008 Round 4	Universitario	2 – 0	Sport Áncash	Lima, Peru
	Candelo 39', 69' (pen.)	Report		Stadium: Estadio Monumental "U"; Referee: Robert Mauro

5 March 2008 Round 5	Cienciano	4 – 1	Universitario	Cusco, Peru
	Sawa 15'; Vassallo 36', 90'; García 68'	Report	Rivas 4'	Stadium: Estadio Garcilaso; Referee: Buckley

9 March 2008 Round 6	Universitario	1 – 0	Sporting Cristal	Lima, Peru
	Neyra 41'	Report		Stadium: Estadio Monumental "U"; Referee: Buckley

16 March 2008 Round 7	Coronel Bolognesi	1 – 1	Universitario	Tacna, Peru
	Gonzáles-Vigil 79'	Report	Hurtado 46'	Stadium: Estadio Jorge Basadre; Referee: Pacheco

23 March 2008 Round 8	Universitario	2 – 1	Atlético Minero	Lima, Peru
	Jiménez 74'; Galvan 86'	Report	Leyva 45'	Stadium: Estadio Monumental "U"; Referee: Villanueva

30 March 2008 Round 9	Alianza Atlético	1 – 0	Universitario	Sullana, Peru
	Ascoy 53'	Report		Stadium: Estadio Campeones del 36; Referee: Hugo Rivera

9 April 2008 Round 11	Universidad César Vallejo	0 – 0	Universitario	Trujillo, Peru
		Report		Stadium: Estadio Mansiche

13 April 2008 Round 12	Universitario	5 – 1	Sport Boys	Lima, Peru
	Hurtado 12', 64', 85'; Jiménez 35'; Neyra 82'	Report	Pérez 59'	Stadium: Estadio Monumental "U"; Referee: Buckley

20 April 2008 Round 13	Melgar	0 – 1	Universitario	Arequipa, Peru
		Report	Hurtado 82'	Stadium: Estadio Melgar; Referee: Carrillo

27 April 2008 Round 14	Universidad de San Martín	1 – 1	Universitario	Lima, Peru
	García (?)	Report	Hurtado 5'	Stadium: Estadio Nacional

30 April 2008 Round 10	Universitario	2 – 1	Alianza Lima	Lima, Peru
	Neyra 28'; Jiménez 89'	Report	Bologna 83' (pen.)	Stadium: Estadio Nacional; Referee: Percy Rojas

4 May 2008 Round 15	Universitario	3 – 2	José Gálvez	Lima, Peru
	Rabanal 21'; Jiménez 28'; Neyra 75'	Report	Velásquez 11'; Iriarte 24'	Stadium: Estadio Monumental "U"; Referee: Buckley

7 May 2008 Round 16	Universitario	3 – 1	Juan Aurich	Lima, Peru
	M. Torres 7'; R. Torres (?); Neyra 73'	Report	Moisela 43'	Stadium: Estadio Monumental "U"

11 May 2008 Round 17	Sport Áncash	0 – 1	Universitario	Huaraz, Peru
		Report	Rabanal 66'	Stadium: Estadio Rosas Pampa; Referee: Carrillo

21 May 2008 Round 20	Universitario	1 – 0	Coronel Bolognesi	Lima, Peru
	Neyra 68'	Report		Stadium: Estadio Monumental "U"

25 May 2008 Round 21	Atlético Minero	0 – 2	Universitario	Huancayo, Peru
		Report	Jiménez 21'; Labarthe 71'	Stadium: Estadio Huancayo

21 June 2008 Round 22	Universitario	2 – 1	Alianza Atlético	Lima, Peru
	Neyra 4'; Hurtado 20'	Report	Ruiz 45'	Stadium: Estadio Monumental "U"; Referee: Hugo Rivera

25 June 2008 Round 19	Sporting Cristal	1 – 2	Universitario	Lima, Peru
	D. Sánchez 25'	Report	Neyra 9'; Hurtado 45'	Stadium: Estadio Nacional; Referee: Pacheco

2 July 2008 Round 18	Universitario	3 – 1	Cienciano	Lima, Peru
	Hurtado 28'; Araujo 45'; Candelo 71' (pen.)	Report	Vassallo 62'	Stadium: Estadio Monumental "U"; Referee: Hugo Rivera

6 July 2008 Round 23	Alianza Lima	1 – 1	Universitario	Lima, Peru
	Neyra 75'	Report	Aguirre 76'	Stadium: Estadio Alejandro Villanueva; Referee: Carrillo

13 July 2008 Round 24	Universitario	0 – 0	Universidad César Vallejo	Lima, Peru
		Report		Stadium: Estadio Monumental "U"; Referee: Robert Mauro

16 July 2008 Round 25	Sport Boys	2 – 1	Universitario	Callao, Peru
	Labarthe 37'	Report	Kukín 60'; Núñez 86'	Stadium: Estadio Miguel Grau; Referee: Hector Rojas

20 July 2008 Round 26	Universitario	2 – 0	Melgar	Lima, Peru
	Torres 37'; Hurtado 69'	Report		Stadium: Estadio Monumental "U"; Referee: Percy Rojas

===== Torneo Clausura =====
27 July 2008 Round 2	José Gálvez	2 – 0	Universitario	Chimbote, Peru
	Muñoz 6'; Velásquez 62'	Report		Stadium: Estadio Manuel Rivera Sanchez

2 August 2008 Round 4	Universitario	2 – 2	Sport Áncash	Lima, Peru
	Candelo 34'; Jiménez 66'	Report	Kukín Flores 57'; Calhiera 74'	Stadium: Estadio Monumental "U"; Referee: Hugo Rivera

10 August 2008 Round 5	Cienciano	2 – 1	Universitario	Cusco, Peru
	Marengo 52'; Edson Uribe 55'	Report	Candelo 24' (pen.)	Stadium: Estadio Garcilaso; Referee: Manuel Garay

13 August 2008 Round 6	Universitario	1 – 2	Sporting Cristal	Lima, Peru
	M. Torres 9'	Report	Palacios 30'; D. Sanchez 36'	Stadium: Estadio Monumental "U"; Referee: Percy Rojas

16 August 2008 Round 7	Coronel Bolognesi	0 – 1	Universitario	Tacna, Peru
		Report	Ramírez 88'	Stadium: Estadio Jorge Basadre; Referee: Gonzales

23 August 2008 Round 8	Universitario	1 – 1	Atlético Minero	Lima, Peru
	Carmona 86'	Report	Ojeda 90+2' (pen.)	Stadium: Estadio Monumental "U"; Referee: Garay

27 August 2008 Round 3	Universitario	1 – 1	Juan Aurich	Lima, Peru
	Hurtado 3'	Report	Zegarra 61' (pen.)	Stadium: Estadio Monumental "U"

30 August 2008 Round 9	Alianza Atlético	1 – 1	Universitario	Sullana, Peru
	Aponte 60'	Report	Neyra 90+5'	Stadium: Estadio Campeones del 36; Referee: Rojas

14 September 2008 Round 10	Universitario	1 – 2	Alianza Lima	Lima, Peru
	Candelo 67' (pen.)	Report	Gonzáles-Vigil 73'; Aguirre 75'	Stadium: Estadio Monumental "U"; Referee: Hugo Rivera

17 September 2008 Round 11	Universidad César Vallejo	2 – 0	Universitario	Trujillo, Peru
	Guevara 75'; Guevara 86'	Report		Stadium: Estadio Mansiche

20 September 2008 Round 12	Universitario	2 – 0	Sport Boys	Lima, Peru
	Neyra 55'; Labarthe 70' (pen.)	Report		Stadium: Estadio Monumental "U"; Referee: Arellanos

24 September 2008 Round 1	Universitario	2 – 1	Universidad de San Martín	Lima, Peru
	Galván 56'; Jiménez 83'	Report	García 22'	Stadium: Estadio Monumental "U"; Referee: Garay

28 September 2008 Round 13	Melgar	1 – 2	Universitario	Arequipa, Peru
	Ibarra 90+2'	Report	Jiménez 15', 58'	Stadium: Estadio Melgar; Referee: Buckley

5 October 2008 Round 14	Universidad de San Martín	1 – 1	Universitario	Callao, Peru
	Diaz 29'	Report	Galván 82'	Stadium: Estadio Miguel Grau; Referee: Hugo Rivera

18 October 2008 Round 15	Universitario	1 – 1	José Gálvez	Lima, Peru
	Hurtado 25'	Report	Velásquez 64'	Stadium: Estadio Monumental "U"; Referee: Pacheco

22 October 2008 Round 16	Universitario	4 – 0	Juan Aurich	Lima, Peru
	Jiménez 6', 55'; Landauri 18'; Neyra 52'	Report		Stadium: Estadio Monumental "U"

26 October 2008 Round 17	Sport Áncash	3 – 0	Universitario	Huaraz, Peru
	Calheira 24', 53', 68'	Report		Stadium: Estadio Rosas Pampa

1 November 2008 Round 18	Universitario	1 – 1	Cienciano	Lima, Peru
	Neyra 42'	Report	Alva 4'	Stadium: Estadio Monumental "U"; Referee: Hugo Rivera

5 November 2008 Round 19	Sporting Cristal	0 – 1	Universitario	Lima, Peru
		Report	Carmona 39'	Stadium: Estadio Nacional; Referee: Buckley

8 November 2008 Round 20	Universitario	1 – 2	Coronel Bolognesi	Lima, Peru
	Neyra 32'	Report	R. Farfan 18'; Demus 61'	Stadium: Estadio Monumental "U"; Referee: Hugo Carrillo

16 November 2008 Round 21	Atlético Minero	1 – 1	Universitario	Matucana, Peru
	Galván 83'	Report	Jiménez 70'	Stadium: Estadio Municipal de Matucana; Referee: Pacheco

25 November 2008 Round 22	Universitario	0 – 2	Alianza Atlético	Lima, Peru
		Report	Ascoy 49'; Soria 70'	Stadium: Estadio Monumental "U"; Referee: Morales

29 November 2008 Round 23	Alianza Lima	1 – 2	Universitario	Lima, Peru
	Aparicio 78'	Report	Hurtado 6', 48'	Stadium: Estadio Alejandro Villanueva; Referee: Hugo Carrillo

3 December 2008 Round 24	Universitario	2 – 1	Universidad César Vallejo	Lima, Peru
	Neyra 14', 29'	Report	Carbajal 59'	Stadium: Estadio Monumental "U"

7 December 2008 Round 25	Sport Boys	0 – 0	Universitario	Callao, Peru
		Report		Stadium: Estadio Miguel Grau; Referee: D. Haro

14 December 2008 Round 26	Universitario	2 – 2	Melgar	Lima, Peru
	Jiménez 43', 66'	Report	Correa 34'; J. Pereyra 68'	Stadium: Estadio Monumental "U"; Referee: M. Garay

=== Friendly ===
Match	Date	Competition or tour	Ground	Opponent	Score^{1}	GD
1	9 Feb 2008	Noche Crema 2008	H	Defensor Sporting (Uruguay)	2 - 2	0
2	31 May 2008	—	A	Colegio Nacional Iquitos	0 - 1	-1
3	7 Jun 2008	—	H	Universidad Católica (Chile)	2 - 1	1

Last updated: 16 Dec 2008
Source: http://www.daleucampeon.4t.com/Amistosos.htm
^{1}Universitario goals come first.
Country's flag depict country of foreign team to that of Universitario.
Ground: H = Home; A = Away; N = Neutral; HR = Home replacement; AR = Away replacement; GD = Goal difference

== See Also ==
- Universitario de Deportes
