= Piero Alva =

Peruvian football striker (born 1979)

Personal information
- Full name: Piero Fernando Alva Niezen
- Date of birth: 14 February 1979 (age 47)
- Place of birth: Lima, Peru
- Height: 1.84 m (6 ft 0 in)
- Position: Striker

Team information
- Current team: Universitario (youth manager)

Youth career
- 1993–1996: Ciclista Lima
- 1997: Universitario

Senior career*
Years	Team	Apps	(Gls)
1998–2000	Universitario	45	(17)
2001 – 2002	Sporting Cristal	46	(7)
2002	Unión	0	(0)
2003	Sport Boys	33	(10)
2004	Sullana	23	(4)
2004–2007	Universitario	113	(39)
2007–2008	Skoda Xanthi	14	(0)
2008	Cienciano	25	(8)
2009–2011	Universitario	102	(32)
2011	Sporting Cristal	12	(1)
2012	Oriente Petrolero	16	(2)
2012	Melgar	10	(2)
2013	César Vallejo	22	(3)
2013	José Gálvez	12	(1)
2014– 2015	Melgar	44	(5)
2015	Cienciano	13	(1)
Total		528	(132)

International career
2000–2009	Peru	17	(3)

Managerial career
- 2022–: Universitario (youth)
- 2025: Universitario (interim)
- * Club domestic league appearances and goals

Piero Fernando Alva Niezen (born 14 February 1979) is a Peruvian football coach and former player who played as a striker. He is the current manager of Universitario's youth sides.

== Club career ==
Alva got his start in Universitario de Deportes as a youth. He got his break in 1998 when Oswaldo Piazza decided to promote several teenage players to the main line-up of the team, particularly after the team had secured the Apertura cup and thus a place in the final game. This generation of players included Manuel Barreto, Mario Gómez, Jorge Araujo, Anthony Matellini, Luis Cordero, Oswaldo Carrion, Francisco Bazán, among others. Alva's debut was in the 2nd half of a game against classic rival Sporting Cristal, a match that Universitario lost. However, Universitario won the 1998 tournament. Alva continued getting chances, despite his controversial playing style; he showed much skill but often did not know when to let go of the ball. It was enough to get him called to the U-20 Peru national team. By 2000, with the departure of Mauro Cantoro and Roberto Farfan from the team, Alva entered the starting eleven. He formed a powerful striking duo playing alongside Eduardo Esidio, aiding him to score the record number of goals in Peruvian football history (and the 2nd highest number of goals by any player worldwide that year) while scoring many of his own – 17 in the Peruvian tournament and one in the Copa Merconorte – and leading Universitario to their historic third championship in a row, capturing both the Apertura and Clausura titles. He was called to join the Peru national football team.

In 2001 Alva was among a legion of star players of Universitario that demanded a much higher salary and left for other teams. Alva was hired by Sporting Cristal for what was rumored to be a $100,000 contract. However, Alva did not shine in his new team, and scored only 7 goals. But his play was good enough to attract the attention of Unión de Santa Fe in the Argentine league, where Alva left to play in 2002. This experience was short-lived and with little success. Alva returned to Peru, and in 2003 he played for Sport Boys, scoring 10 goals.

Alva moved to Alianza Atletico Sullana in 2004, scoring 4 goals in the Apertura tournament and aiding his team's offense overall. His play improved and was reminiscent of his peak in the 2000 season. This attracted the attention of Universitario, who got him on a loan for the Clausura tournament. He scored an additional 6 goals for 'la U'. He officially signed on for Universitario in 2005, scoring 12 goals while playing in the midfield as the team's '10'. Although 'la U' failed to win both the Apertura and Clausura, winding up in 2nd place both times, they still scored the most points and the most goals, and thus qualified for the Copa Libertadores. In 2006, in a striker role again, Alva scored 16 goals (3 in the Apertura, 13 in the Clausura), making him the second most effective striker of the Peruvian league. He was invited back to Peru national football team. He was also often the team captain of Universitario. However, fans blamed him for missing scoring chances with easy-seeming set-ups in key games that led to Universitario's failure to win the Clausura tournament; despite being in the lead, they were tied at last minute by Cienciano and then lost the final match.

As a result, in 2007 Alva's relationship with the press, the fans, the managers, and his coach progressively deteriorated. Alva was additionally criticized for possibly making false claims of being in negotiations with teams from Brazil, Argentina, and Europe in order to secure a higher contract from Universitario. Alva's relationship with coach Jorge Amado Nunes worsened to the extent of an open verbal battle, leading to Nunes being ousted as coach. It was never confirmed, but Nunes accused a group of players made up by Alva, Luis Guadalupe, Donny Neyra, Marco Ruiz, and Gregorio Bernales of being directly involved in his being fired. Alva and these fellow players were accused of trying to run the team to keep the veteran players in charge. A few weeks later, after new elections at the club, interim coach Edgar Ospina was removed for Nunes to be re-instated. Alva and these other players played a very bad game against Deportivo San Martin, losing 0–3, and were accused of throwing the game in protest. As a result, Alva was removed from the main team with most of the other controversial players and some others. Alva negotiated a deal to leave the club. He only scored 2 goals in this season. In June 2007, after much speculation and offers from local teams, it was announced that Alva would be playing in the Skoda Xanthi in Greece In Greece, Alva had a bad season without goals and he released in May 2008. In July 2008. he signed a contract with Cienciano del Cuzco. He scored his first goal on 30 July. At the end of the season he scored 8 goals. In January 2009 he would sign for one year with Universitario de Deportes.

== Titles ==
Season	Club	Title
Campeonato Descentralizado 1998	Universitario	Primera División Peruana
Campeonato Descentralizado 1999	Universitario	Primera División Peruana
Campeonato Descentralizado 2000	Universitario	Primera División Peruana
Campeonato Descentralizado 2009	Universitario	Primera División Peruana
