= Adrián Coria =

Adrián Coria may refer to:

- Adrián Coria (football manager) (born 1959), Argentine football manager
- Adrián Coria (footballer) (born 1977), Argentine footballer
