= 2008 FBC Melgar season =

FBC Melgar
2008 season
- Stadium: Estadio Melgar
- Torneo Descentralizado: Torneo Apertura: Seventh (7°); Torneo Clausura: Eighth (8°); Aggregate Table: Eighth (8°); Eighth National (8°)
Home colours	Away colours	Third colours

The 2008 FBC Melgar season were the Ninety-Fourth (94.º) of the club from its foundation in 1915, Thirty-Nine (39) participations in the top-flight of Peruvian Primera División (of 92 Editions) with denomination Torneo Descentralizado. In Previous Season the club qualified as 8th Place of the 2007 Torneo Descentralizado.

Melgar were a of fourteen (14) clubs in the Forty-Third edition (43.º) Torneo Descentralizado, the competition most important of the Peruvian football. The club played the Peruvian Primera División.

== Torneo Descentralizado ==
=== Torneo Apertura ===
Pos	Team	Pld	W	D	L	GF	GA	GD	Pts
9	José Gálvez FBC	26	7	9	10	26	32	-6	30
10	FBC Melgar	22	7	9	10	18	25	-7	30
11	Alianza Lima	22	7	8	11	27	32	-5	29

== See also ==
- FBC Melgar
- 2008 Torneo Descentralizado
