= Manuel Calderón =

Manuel Calderón may refer to:

- Manuel Calderón (footballer)
- Manuel Calderon (musician)
