= Javier Molina (disambiguation) =

Javier Molina (born 1990) is an American boxer.

Javier Molina may also refer to:

- Javier Molina (footballer) (born 1985), Peruvian footballer
- Xavi Molina (born 1986), Spanish footballer
- Javier Molina (tennis) (born 1970), Spanish tennis player
