= Raúl Fernández (footballer, born 1985) =

Peruvian footballer

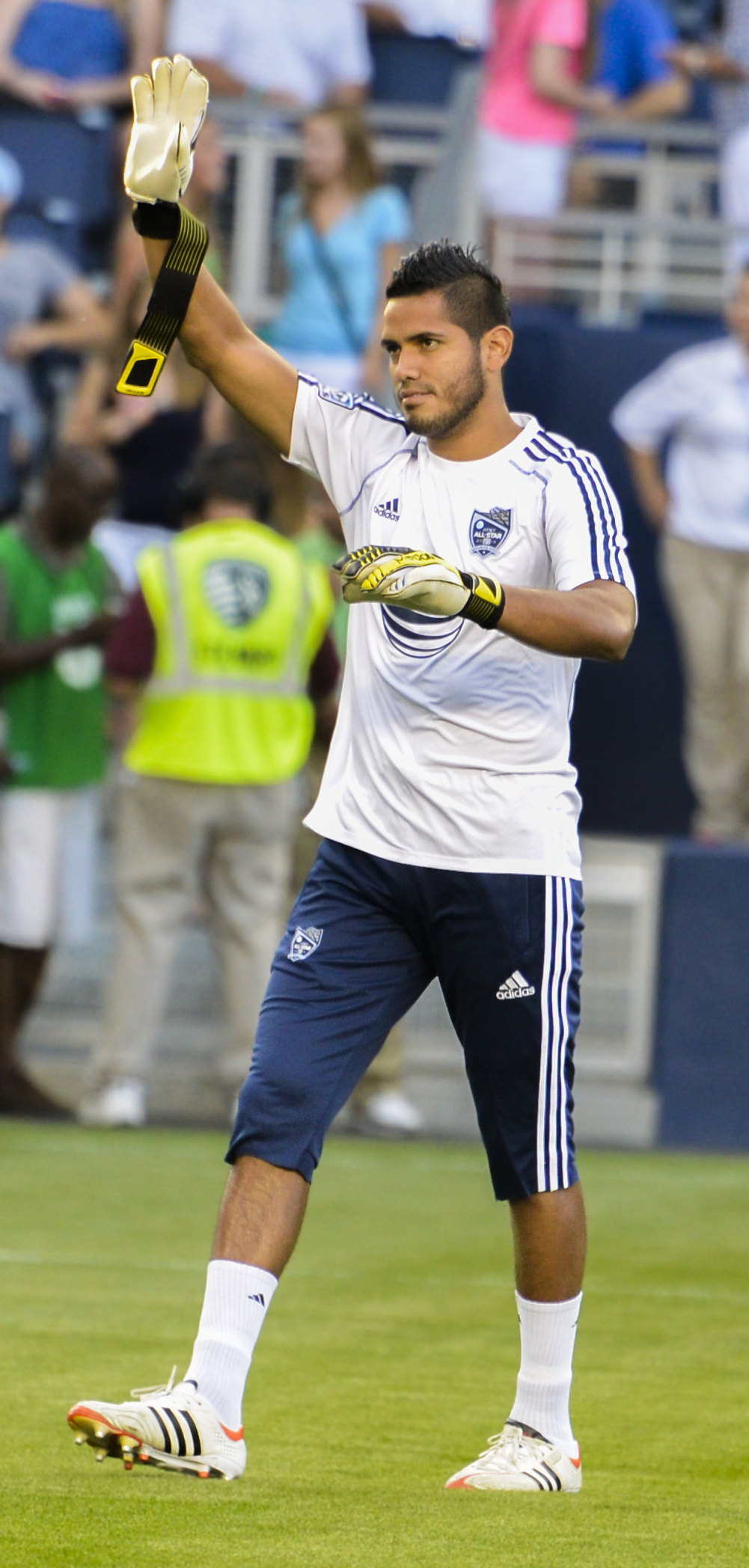
- Fernández warming up for the 2013 MLS All-Star Game

Personal information
- Full name: Raúl Omar Fernández Valverde
- Date of birth: 6 October 1985 (age 41)
- Place of birth: Lima, Peru
- Height: 1.85 m (6 ft 1 in)
- Position: Goalkeeper

Youth career
- 2000–2005: Universitario

Senior career*
Years	Team	Apps	(Gls)
2005–2006	Universitario	5	(0)
2006	Sport Áncash	2	(0)
2007–2010	Universitario	130	(0)
2011–2012	Nice	2	(0)
2011	→ Universitario (loan)	10	(0)
2013–2014	FC Dallas	48	(0)
2014	FC Dallas Reserves	3	(0)
2015–2018	Universitario	54	(0)
2019	UCV	27	(0)
2020–2021	Binacional	44	(0)
2022-2023	Atlético Grau	55	(0)
Total		380	(0)

International career
2008–2014	Peru	29	(0)
Medal record
Representing Peru
Association football
Copa América
Bronze medal – third place	Argentina 2011
- * Club domestic league appearances and goals

Raúl Omar Fernández Valverde (Spanish pronunciation: [ɾaˈul feɾˈnandeθ βalˈβeɾðe]; born 6 October 1985) is a Peruvian former professional footballer who played as a goalkeeper. He works as a goalkeeper coach for at Columbia Premier SC in the United States.

== Club career ==
=== Universitario ===
Fernández was born in Lima, Peru. He got his start in the youth system of Universitario de Deportes. He made his professional debut with the club in a 1–1 draw with Unión Huaral on 31 July 2005.

He spent half of the 2006 season playing for Sport Áncash but returned to Universitario the following season.

After Juan Flores left Universitario to sign with Cienciano for the 2007 season, José Carvallo took over as the team's starting goalkeeper over Fernández. On 22 September 2007, the coach, Julio Gómez, decided to give Fernández his first start of the season against Total Clean. Universitario won the match 0–1 and Fernández became the starting goalkeeper for the team after that game.

In 2008, Fernández helped his team win the Torneo Apertura 2008, with Ricardo Gareca as his coach. His strong performances earned him the nickname 'Superman' and he was chosen as the Goalkeeper of the Year for the 2008 season.

In 2009, Universitario won the 2009 Torneo Descentralizado after defeating their local rival, Alianza Lima, in a playoff series to conclude a season where Fernández was considered a key factor for the team's success. His performances throughout the year, especially in the first playoff game against Alianza Lima got the attention of international scouts who would later contact him from various clubs in Europe. He was named the Goalkeeper of the Year and Player of the Year for the 2009 Peruvian domestic league.

=== Nice ===
Fernández signed with French club OGC Nice in December 2010. However, Universitario de Deportes opted to take him on loan for the first six months of his deal. He made his debut for Nice in the third round of the 2011–12 Coupe de la Ligue, in a 1–2 victory against Toulouse. He was Nice's match hero against Dijon when he stopped a penalty during shoot-outs to help his team advance to the semifinals of the same tournament. He had limited appearances during his time with the club, who had David Ospina as their starting goalkeeper.

=== FC Dallas ===
Fernández signed with FC Dallas on 10 January 2013. He made his regular-season debut on the club's opening match for the 2013 season in a 1–0 victory versus Colorado Rapids. Due to his good performances for the club, he was voted by the fans to be the starting goalkeeper for the MLS All-Stars roster in the 2013 MLS All-Star Game. After two seasons with Dallas, Fernández was released at the end of the 2014 season following the team's acquisition of Dan Kennedy.

=== Universitario ===
Fernández returned to Universitario after signing a four-year contract in January 2015. In 2016, playing against Juan Aurich, he crashed with a teammate and suffered a knee injury that kept him sidelined for months. Despite the absence of Fernández, Universitario won the 2016 Torneo Apertura with Carlos Cáceda taking over as the new starting goalkeeper. He was heavily blamed for Universitario's exit from the 2018 Copa Libertadores after a costly error on the final minutes of the second leg game of the first stage allowed Oriente Petrolero to score an away goal that would eliminate the team from advancing to the second stage.

=== UCV ===
In January 2019, Fernández signed for the recently promoted Universidad César Vallejo and reunited with former head coach José del Solar.

=== Binacional ===
On 11 January 2020, Fernández signed for the reigning Peruvian Liga 1 champions Deportivo Binacional.

== International career ==
Fernández was first called up to play for Peru by José del Solar in March 2008 for a friendly match against Costa Rica. He made his debut in the final minutes of that match, subbing in for George Forsyth. Del Solar called up Fernández for some of Peru's 2010 FIFA World Cup CONMEBOL qualification campaign but only used him for one match, against Ecuador in a 1–2 loss. After Del Solar's departure from the national team, Sergio Markarián was appointed as the new manager. Fernández was called up by Markarian for a series of friendly games in 2010 and 2011, including the 2011 Kirin Cup in Japan. He was also part of Peru's squad for the 2011 Copa América in Argentina, in which he helped Peru finish third place. For the 2014 FIFA World Cup CONMEBOL qualification campaign, Fernández played in 11 of Peru's matches. After Markarian left the national team, new interim head coach Pablo Bengoechea called up Fernández for some of Peru's friendly matches in 2014. Fernández's last appearance for Peru was in a friendly match against Chile, in which Peru lost 0–3. In total, Fernández has made 29 appearances for the national team and has recorded 14 clean sheets.

== Coaching career ==
Fernández was appointed "Director of Goalkeeper Development" at Columbia Premier SC in the United States in April 2024.

== Career statistics ==
=== Club ===
Appearances and goals by club, season and competition
Club	Season	League			National cup		Continental		Total	
Club	Season	Division	Apps	Goals	Apps	Goals	Apps	Goals	Apps	Goals
Universitario	2005	Torneo Descentralizado	2	0					2	0
Universitario	2006	Torneo Descentralizado	3	0					3	0
Universitario	Total		5	0					5	0
Sport Áncash	2006	Torneo Descentralizado	2	0					2	0
Universitario	2007	Torneo Descentralizado	15	0					15	0
Universitario	2008	Torneo Descentralizado	45	0			2	0	47	0
Universitario	2009	Torneo Descentralizado	35	0			6	0	41	0
Universitario	2010	Torneo Descentralizado	35	0			6	0	41	0
Universitario	Total		130	0			14	0	144	0
Nice	2011–12	Ligue 1	2	0	5	0			7	0
Universitario (loan)	2011	Torneo Descentralizado	10	0					10	0
FC Dallas	2013	MLS	26	0					26	0
FC Dallas	2014	MLS	22	0	2	0			24	0
FC Dallas	Total		48	0	2	0			50	0
FC Dallas Reserves	2014	USL Championship	3	0					3	0
Universitario	2015	Torneo Descentralizado	15	0	8	0	2	0	25	0
Universitario	2016	Torneo Descentralizado	9	0					9	0
Universitario	2017	Torneo Descentralizado	5	0					5	0
Universitario	2018	Torneo Descentralizado	25	0			2	0	27	0
Universitario	Total		54	0	8	0	4	0	66	0
César Vallejo	2019	Liga 1	27	0					27	0
Binacional	2020	Liga 1	24	0	1	0	6	0	31	0
Binacional	2021	Liga 1	19	0	0	0	0	0	20	0
Binacional	Total		44	0	1	0	6	0	51	0
Atlético Grau	2022	Liga 1	33	0	0	0	0	0	33	0
Atlético Grau	2023	Liga 1	22	0	0	0	0	0	22	0
Atlético Grau	Total		55	0	0	0	0	0	55	0
Career total			380	0	16	0	24	0	420	0

=== International ===
Appearances and goals by national team and year
National team	Year	Apps	Goals
Peru	2008	1	0
Peru	2009	3	0
Peru	2010	2	0
Peru	2011	10	0
Peru	2012	5	0
Peru	2013	6	0
Peru	2014	2	0
Total		29	0

== Honours ==
Universitario

- Torneo Apertura: 2008; 2016
- Torneo Descentralizado: 2009

Peru

- Copa América third place: 2011

Individual

- Peruvian Primera División Goalkeeper of the Year: 2008; 2009
- Peruvian Primera División Player of the Year: 2009
- MLS All-Star: 2013
