= Manuel Calderón (footballer) =

Peruvian footballer (born 1990)

Personal information
- Full name: Manuel Arturo Calderón Maraví
- Date of birth: January 28, 1990 (age 36)
- Place of birth: Lima, Peru
- Height: 1.82 m (6 ft 0 in)
- Position: Centre-back

Team information
- Current team: Unión Huaral
- Number: 13

Youth career
- –2007: Universitario

Senior career*
| Years | Team | Apps | (Gls) |
| 2007–2009 | Universitario | 15 | (0) |
| 2010 | → Juan Aurich (loan) | 1 | (0) |
| 2010 | → Sport Boys (loan) | 13 | (0) |
| 2011 | Sport Boys | 13 | (0) |
| 2012 | José Gálvez | 28 | (0) |
| 2013 | Inti Gas | 0 | (0) |
| 2014 | Deportivo Municipal | 19 | (1) |
| 2015 | Willy Serrato | 11 | (0) |
| 2015–2017 | Alianza Atlético | 56 | (1) |
| 2018 | Alfonso Ugarte | 21 | (1) |
| 2018 | Molinos El Pirata | 3 | (0) |
| 2019 | Deportivo Garcilaso | 4 | (0) |
| 2020– | Deportivo Llacuabamba | 0 | (0) |

International career
| 2007–2008 | Peru U17 | 5 | (0) |
| 2009 | Peru U20 | 3 | (0) |
- * Club domestic league appearances and goals as of 22 May 2012

Manuel Arturo "Chino" Calderón Maraví (born January 28, 1990) is a Peruvian footballer who plays as a centre-back for Unión Huaral in the Liga 3.

== Club career ==
Calderón was born in Lima. He made his senior debut in the Torneo Descentralizado on March 9, 2008, in the Universitario - Sporting Cristal derby in the 6th round of the 2008 apertura. He entered the match in the 75th minute, replacing center back Jorge Araujo. The derby finished 1–0 in favor of Universitario.

== International career ==
Calderón played for Peru at the 2007 FIFA U-17 World Cup in the Republic of Korea.

== Titles ==
| Season | Club | Title |
|---|---|---|
| Torneo Apertura 2008 | Universitario | Torneo Descentralizado |
| Campeonato Descentralizado 2009 | Universitario | Torneo Descentralizado |
