= 2013 MLS All-Star Game =

Soccer game played in Kansas City, Kansas

AT&T MLS All-Star Game 2013
- Event: 2013 Major League Soccer season
MLS All-Stars	Roma
(United States) (Canada)	(Italy)
1	3
- Date: July 31, 2013
- Venue: Sporting Park, Kansas City, Kansas
- Most Valuable Player: Alessandro Florenzi (Roma)
- Referee: Hilario Grajeda
- Attendance: 21,175

The 2013 Major League Soccer All-Star Game, held on July 31, 2013, was the 18th annual Major League Soccer All-Star Game, a soccer match involving all-stars from Major League Soccer. The game was played at Sporting Park, now known as Children's Mercy Park, in Kansas City, Kansas.

The game featured the MLS All-Stars against Roma from Italy's Serie A, marking the first time that an Italian team has played in the MLS All-Star Game. Roma is also the first European club not from Great Britain to play in the All-Star Game.

Peter Vermes, the coach of Sporting Kansas City (the All-Star Game's host), was announced to coach the MLS All-Stars. A unique feature of this year's MLS All-Star Game was that the 11th player in the fan XI was decided through the FIFA 13 video game, with players from around the world scoring goals with their player of choice, and the player with the most goals scored at the end of the allotted time frame would earn their place. Italian Montreal Impact striker Marco Di Vaio made the cut, joining the ten other fan XI players and those voted for by other MLS players and those chosen by Peter Vermes and MLS Commissioner Don Garber. Despite initially being selected, Robbie Keane and Tim Cahill, of LA Galaxy and New York Red Bulls, were both removed from the squad due to injury, which led to their being replaced by Landon Donovan and Jack McInerney, playing for LA Galaxy and Philadelphia Union.

A.S. Roma won the game 3–1, with goals from Kevin Strootman, Alessandro Florenzi, and Junior Tallo.

== Rosters ==
=== MLS All-Stars ===
As of July 28, 2013

Note: Flags indicate national team as defined under FIFA eligibility rules; some limited exceptions apply. Players may hold more than one non-FIFA nationality.

No.	Pos.	Nation	Player
1	GK	PER	Raúl Fernández (FC Dallas •)
2	DF	USA	Tony Beltran (Real Salt Lake ♦)
3	FW	USA	Mike Magee (Chicago Fire FC •)
4	DF	USA	Omar Gonzalez (LA Galaxy •)
5	DF	USA	Matt Besler (Sporting Kansas City •)
6	FW	USA	Chris Wondolowski (San Jose Earthquakes •)
7	FW	USA	Landon Donovan (LA Galaxy %)
8	MF	USA	Graham Zusi (Sporting Kansas City •)
9	FW	ITA	Marco Di Vaio (Montreal Impact •*)
10	MF	CAN	Patrice Bernier (Montreal Impact ♦)
11	MF	USA	Brad Davis (Houston Dynamo •)

No.	Pos.	Nation	Player
14	FW	FRA	Thierry Henry (New York Red Bulls •)
15	MF	CAN	Will Johnson (Portland Timbers •)
18	GK	USA	Nick Rimando (Real Salt Lake ♦)
19	FW	USA	Jack McInerney (Philadelphia Union %)
20	DF	USA	DeAndre Yedlin (Seattle Sounders FC ♦)
22	FW	BRA	Camilo Sanvezzo (Vancouver Whitecaps FC ♦)
23	MF	USA	Kyle Beckerman (Real Salt Lake ♦)
26	DF	USA	Corey Ashe (Houston Dynamo ♦)
78	DF	FRA	Aurélien Collin (Sporting Kansas City •)
—	MF	AUS	Tim Cahill (New York Red Bulls ♦#)
—	FW	IRL	Robbie Keane (LA Galaxy ♦#)

•- Fan XI
*- 11th Player of Fan XI, determined through FIFA 13

♦ - Players selected by MLS Commissioner Don Garber and All-Star Coach Peter Vermes
♥ - "Inactive Roster" players voted for by other players in MLS
#- Injured Player that was replaced
% - Chosen by Don Garber and Peter Vermes to replace the injured Robbie Keane and Tim Cahill

=== Roma squad ===
As of July 25, 2013

Note: Flags indicate national team as defined under FIFA eligibility rules; some limited exceptions apply. Players may hold more than one non-FIFA nationality.

No.	Pos.	Nation	Player
1	GK	ROU	Bogdan Lobonț
4	MF	USA	Michael Bradley
5	DF	BRA	Leandro Castán
6	MF	NED	Kevin Strootman
7	MF	BRA	Marquinho
8	FW	ARG	Erik Lamela
9	FW	ITA	Dani Osvaldo
10	FW	ITA	Francesco Totti (captain)
11	FW	BRA	Rodrigo Taddei
13	DF	BRA	Maicon
15	MF	BIH	Miralem Pjanić
16	MF	ITA	Daniele De Rossi (vice-captain)
17	DF	MAR	Mehdi Benatia
18	FW	ITA	Gianluca Caprari

No.	Pos.	Nation	Player
20	FW	CIV	Junior Tallo
22	FW	ITA	Mattia Destro
24	DF	ITA	Alessandro Florenzi
26	GK	ITA	Morgan De Sanctis
27	DF	BRA	Dodô
28	GK	POL	Łukasz Skorupski
29	DF	ARG	Nicolás Burdisso
31	FW	ITA	Marco Borriello
33	DF	CRO	Tin Jedvaj
35	DF	GRE	Vasilis Torosidis
42	DF	ITA	Federico Balzaretti
46	DF	ITA	Alessio Romagnoli
51	FW	ITA	Federico Ricci
91	DF	ITA	Alessandro Crescenzi

== Match details ==
July 31, 2013
8:00 p.m. CDT

MLS All-Stars (United States) (Canada)	1–3	(Italy) Roma
Gonzalez 90+1'	Report	Collin 4' (o.g.); Florenzi 47'; Tallo 69'

Sporting Park, Kansas City, Kansas
Attendance: 21,175
Referee: Hilario Grajeda

MLS All-Stars	Roma

GK	1	(Peru) Raúl Fernández	(substituted off) 46'
RB	2	(United States) Tony Beltran
CB	78	(France) Aurélien Collin
CB	5	(United States) Matt Besler	(substituted off) 46'
LB	26	(United States) Corey Ashe	(substituted off) 66'
DM	23	(United States) Kyle Beckerman	(substituted off) 46'
RM	8	(United States) Graham Zusi	(substituted off) 24'
CM	15	(Canada) Will Johnson	(substituted off) 46'
LM	11	(United States) Brad Davis	(substituted off) 46'
CF	9	(Italy) Marco Di Vaio	(substituted off) 46'
CF	14	(France) Thierry Henry (c)	(substituted off) 57'
Substitutes:
FW	22	(Brazil) Camilo Sanvezzo	(substituted on) 24'
GK	18	(United States) Nick Rimando	(substituted on) 46'
DF	4	(United States) Omar Gonzalez	(substituted on) 46'
FW	3	(United States) Mike Magee	(substituted on) 46'
FW	6	(United States) Chris Wondolowski	(substituted on) 46'
FW	7	(United States) Landon Donovan	(substituted on) 46'
FW	19	(United States) Jack McInerney	(substituted on) 57'
DF	20	(United States) DeAndre Yedlin	(substituted on) 66'
Manager:
(United States) Peter Vermes

GK	26	(Italy) Morgan De Sanctis		(substituted off) 63'
RB	35	(Greece) Vasilis Torosidis
CB	17	(Morocco) Mehdi Benatia
CB	5	(Brazil) Leandro Castán
LB	42	(Italy) Federico Balzaretti
CM	4	(United States) Michael Bradley
CM	15	(Bosnia and Herzegovina) Miralem Pjanić	(yellow card) 54'	(substituted off) 63'
CM	6	(Netherlands) Kevin Strootman
RF	24	(Italy) Alessandro Florenzi		(substituted off) 63'
CF	20	(Ivory Coast) Junior Tallo		(substituted off) 80'
LF	10	(Italy) Francesco Totti (c)		(substituted off) 87'
Substitutes:
GK	1	(Romania) Bogdan Lobonț		(substituted on) 63'
MF	7	(Brazil) Marquinho	(yellow card) 85'	(substituted on) 63'
MF	16	(Italy) Daniele De Rossi		(substituted on) 63'
FW	18	(Italy) Gianluca Caprari		(substituted on) 80'
FW	51	(Italy) Federico Ricci		(substituted on) 87'
Manager:
(France) Rudi Garcia

Volkswagen MLS All-Star MVP:
(Italy) Alessandro Florenzi (Roma)
Assistant referees:
Paul Scott
Bill Dittmar
Fourth official:
Drew Fischer

Match rules

- 90 minutes without extra time.
- Penalty shoot-out if scores still level.
- Maximum of ten substitutions.
