= Julio Landauri =

Peruvian footballer (born 1986)

Personal information
- Full name: Julio César Landauri Ventura
- Date of birth: March 17, 1986 (age 40)
- Place of birth: Bellavista, Peru
- Height: 1.73 m (5 ft 8 in)
- Positions: Attacking midfielder; left winger

Team information
- Current team: Alianza Universidad
- Number: 20

Youth career
- 2002-2003: Sentimiento (SBA) Porteño

Senior career*
Years	Team	Apps	(Gls)
2004–2007	Sport Boys	34	(3)
2008–2009	Universitario	39	(1)
2010	Braşov	6	(0)
2010	Total Chalaco	7	(0)
2011	Inti Gas	26	(3)
2012	Univ. César Vallejo	27	(1)
2013	Inti Gas	39	(7)
2014–2016	Alianza Lima	99	(7)
2017	Sport Huancayo	31	(5)
2018	Real Garcilaso	37	(1)
2019–	Alianza Universidad	39	(4)

International career
2009	Peru U-23		
- * Club domestic league appearances and goals as of 08:28, 20 May 2020 (UTC)

Julio César Landauri Ventura (born March 17, 1986) in Bellavista is a Peruvian football striker, who currently plays for Alianza Universidad in the Torneo Descentralizado.

== International career ==
Landauri was named in Peru's provisional squad for Copa América Centenario but was cut from the final squad.

== Teams ==
Season	Country	League	Team	Performance
2004–05	Peru	Primera División Peruana	Sport Boys	8th of 13
2005–06	Peru	Primera División Peruana	Sport Boys	10th of 12
2006–07	Peru	Primera División Peruana	Sport Boys	6th of 12
2007–08	Peru	Primera División Peruana	Sport Boys	14th of 14
2008–09	Peru	Primera División Peruana	Universitario de Deportes	Champions (16 teams)
2009–10	Romania	Liga I	FC Brașov	9th of (18 teams)
2010	Peru	Primera División Peruana	Total Chalaco	16th of 16
2011	Peru	Primera División Peruana	Inti Gas	7th of 16
2012	Peru	Primera División Peruana	Univ. César Vallejo	3rd of 16
2013	Peru	Primera División Peruana	Inti Gas	7th of 16

== Titles won ==
Season	Club	Title
Torneo Apertura 2008	Universitario	Primera División Peruana
Campeonato Descentralizado 2009	Universitario	Primera División Peruana
2014 Torneo del Inca	Alianza Lima	Torneo del Inca
