= Néstor Duarte =

Peruvian footballer (born 1990)

Personal information
- Full name: Néstor Alonso Duarte Carassa
- Date of birth: 8 September 1990 (age 36)
- Place of birth: Callao, Peru
- Height: 1.83 m (6 ft 0 in)
- Position: Center back

Team information
- Current team: Academia Cantolao
- Number: 42

Senior career*
Years	Team	Apps	(Gls)
2007–2015	Universitario	145	(1)
2015–2016	Real Garcilaso	7	(0)
2016–2017	Ayacucho	3	(0)
2017	UTC	31	(1)
2018	Sport Huancayo	0	(0)
2018–	Academia Cantolao	5	(0)

International career
2007–2008	Peru U17	15	(1)
2012–2013	Peru	6	(0)
- * Club domestic league appearances and goals as of 3 March 2019

Néstor Alonso Duarte Carassa (born 8 September 1990) is a Peruvian footballer who currently plays for Academia Cantolao in the Torneo Descentralizado, as a center back.

== Club career ==
=== Universitario ===
Before the 2007 FIFA U-17 World Cup started, Universitario only had contributed 2 players to the U-17 national team; Gary Correa and Juan Zevallos. After the U-17 World Cup, Universitario began to sign several of the U-17 players. Duarte was one of the first U-17 players to sign with Universitario and he made his debut on November 11, 2007 playing against Sport Boys which they won 3-1. Duarte also became a regular starting defender after that game.

== International career ==
Duarte was the captain of the Peru national under-17 football team. With the national team, he qualified for the 2007 FIFA U-17 World Cup in South Korea, with other youth players like Reimond Manco, Carlos Bazalar, Manuel Calderón, Irven Ávila, and Gary Correa. They made it through the group stage, passed the Round of 16, but were eliminated in the quarterfinals.

== Honours ==
=== Club ===
Universitario de Deportes

- Apertura: 2008
- Torneo Descentralizado (2): 2009, 2013
- U-20 Copa Libertadores (1): 2011
