= Jean Tragodara =

Peruvian footballer (born 1985)

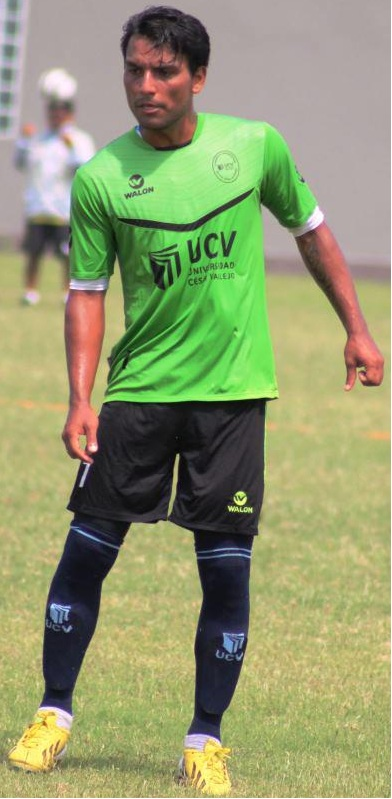

Personal information
- Full name: Jean Carlo Tragodara Gálvez
- Date of birth: December 16, 1985 (age 40)
- Place of birth: Lima, Peru
- Height: 1.78 m (5 ft 10 in)
- Position: Midfielder

Team information
- Current team: Sport Boys
- Number: 17

Youth career
- Universitario

Senior career*
Years	Team	Apps	(Gls)
2005–2008	Universitario	5	(0)
2005–2007	→ Sport Ancash (loan)	64	(2)
2008	→ Atlético Minero (loan)	23	(1)
2009	Inti Gas Deportes	42	(7)
2010–2011	Alianza Lima	39	(2)
2011–2012	Once Caldas	1	(0)
2012	Inti Gas Deportes	14	(0)
2013	Universidad César Vallejo	31	(1)
2014	UT Cajamarca	18	(0)
2015–2016	León de Huánuco	25	(0)
2016–2017	Defensor La Bocana	35	(2)
2017	Comerciantes Unidos	40	(2)
2018	Real Garcilaso	16	(3)
2019–	Sport Boys	19	(10)

International career
2010–2011	Peru	5	(1)
- * Club domestic league appearances and goals as of 18:59, 3 May 2020 (UTC)

Jean Carlo Tragodara Gálvez (born 16 December 1985 in Lima) is a Peruvian footballer who plays as a midfielder for Sport Boys.

Tragodara previously played for Universitario de Deportes, Atlético Minero, Inti Gas Deportes, Universidad César Vallejo, Universidad Técnica de Cajamarca, Colombian club Once Caldas and Comerciantes Unidos

== International goals ==
#	Date	Venue	Opponent	Score	Result	Competition
1	September 4, 2010	Toronto	Canada	2-0	Win	Friendly
