= Miguel Torres (footballer, born 1982) =

Peruvian footballer

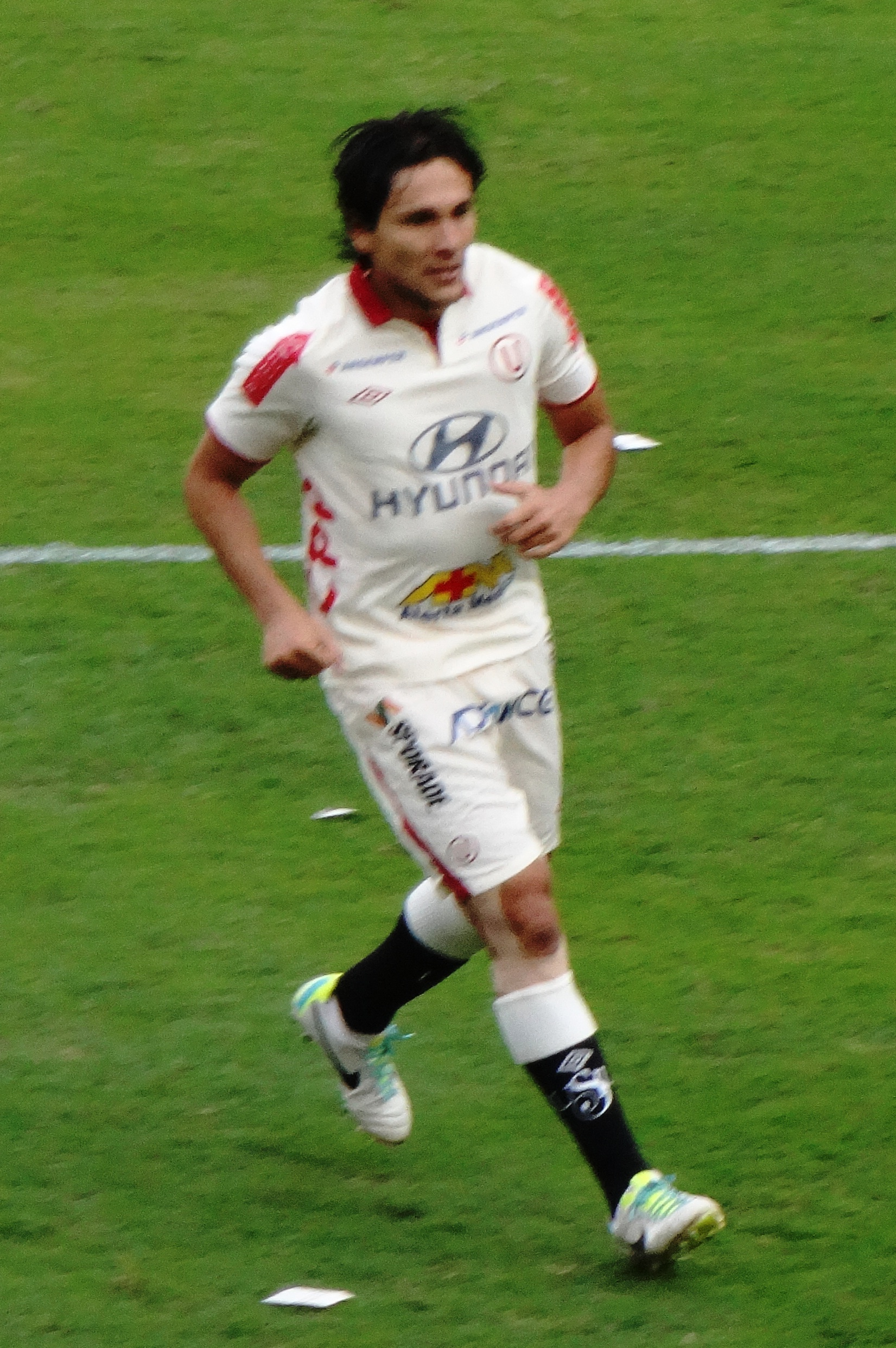

Personal information
- Full name: Miguel Ángel Torres Quintana
- Date of birth: 17 January 1982 (age 44)
- Place of birth: Lima, Peru
- Height: 1.77 m (5 ft 10 in)
- Position: Winger

Youth career
- Universitario

Senior career*
Years	Team	Apps	(Gls)
2000–2002	Universitario	24	(0)
2003	Coronel Bolognesi	29	(1)
2004	Sport Boys	25	(2)
2005–2006	Cienciano	84	(1)
2007–2014	Universitario	137	(6)
2015–2016	Ayacucho FC	12	(1)
2016	Club Atlético Torino	9	(0)

International career
2008–2009	Peru	5	(0)
- * Club domestic league appearances and goals as of 1 October 2011

Miguel Angel Torres Quintana (born 17 January 1982) is a Peruvian former footballer who played as a winger.

== Career ==
Torres started out with Universitario and played for two years. He then went to Coronel Bolognesi for a year. He then played two years for Sport Boys and finally played for Cienciano before returning to Universitario in 2007. In 2007, he did not play regularly. However, in 2008 he became part of the starting line-up and played the right-wing midfield with a lot of success due to his speed and stamina.

Torres has made five appearances for the Peru national football team.

== Honours ==
=== Club ===
Cienciano

- Torneo Apertura: 2005
- Torneo Clausura: 2006

Universitario de Deportes

- Apertura: 2002, 2008
- Torneo Descentralizado (3): 2000, 2009, 2013
