= Carlos Tovar =

Peruvian footballer (1914–2006)

Personal information
- Full name: Carlos Tovar Venegas
- Date of birth: 2 April 1914
- Date of death: 15 June 2006 (aged 92)

Senior career*
Years	Team	Apps	(Gls)
- Universitario

International career
1935–1939	Peru	15	(0)
- * Club domestic league appearances and goals

Carlos Tovar Venegas (2 April 1914 – 15 June 2006) was a Peruvian international football player. He participated with the Peru national football team at the 1936 Summer Olympics in Berlin.

== Career ==
Tovar played club football for Universitario de Deportes. He earned 15 caps for Peru between 1935 and 1939.
