= Jersson Vásquez =

Peruvian footballer (born 1986)

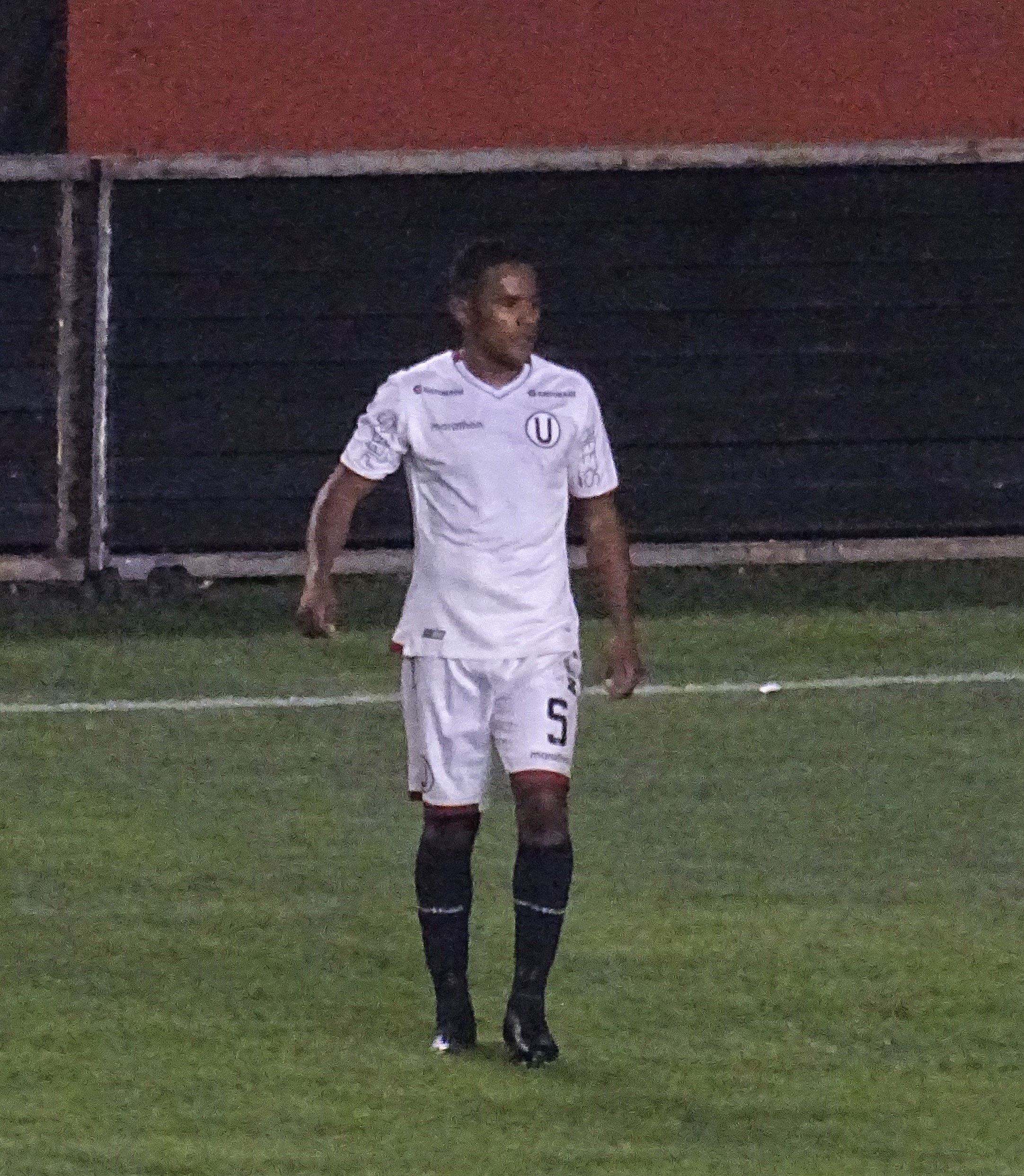
- Vásquez in 2018

Personal information
- Full name: Jersson Vásquez Shapiama
- Date of birth: 5 March 1986 (age 40)
- Place of birth: Lima, Peru
- Height: 1.74 m (5 ft 9 in)
- Position: Left-back

Team information
- Current team: César Vallejo
- Number: 86

Senior career*
| Years | Team | Apps | (Gls) |
| 2004–2006 | Sporting Cristal | | |
| 2007 | Total Clean | 11 | (0) |
| 2008–2009 | José Gálvez | 49 | (2) |
| 2010–2011 | Juan Aurich | 23 | (0) |
| 2011 | Unión Comercio | 3 | (0) |
| 2012–2013 | José Gálvez | 75 | (17) |
| 2014–2015 | Universidad San Martín | 50 | (5) |
| 2016 | Deportivo Municipal | 22 | (1) |
| 2017–2019 | Universitario | 109 | (15) |
| 2020– | César Vallejo | 68 | (6) |
- * Club domestic league appearances and goals as of 21:41, 28 April 2020 (UTC)

Jersson Vásquez Shapiama (born 5 March 1986) is a Peruvian professional footballer who plays as a left-back for César Vallejo in the Torneo Descentralizado.

== Career ==
Jersson Vasquez began his career with Sporting Cristal in 2004. He was part of the Cristal squad that finished as champions of the 2005 Torneo Descentralizado.

Then he had a short spell with Total Clean FBC in 2007. He made 11 appearances in his time with the Arequipa side.

In January 2008 he joined José Gálvez FBC.
