= Manuel Barreto =

Peruvian footballer (born 1982)

Personal information
- Full name: Manuel Francisco Barreto Sayán
- Date of birth: 12 September 1982 (age 44)
- Place of birth: Lima, Peru
- Height: 1.77 m (5 ft 10 in)
- Position: Striker

Youth career
- 1997: Universitario

Senior career*
Years	Team	Apps	(Gls)
1998	Universitario	1	(1)
2002–2005	Coronel Bolognesi	77	(27)
2005–2006	Universitario	36	(6)
2007	APOEL	4	(0)
2008	Universidad San Martín	26	(6)
2009	José Gálvez FBC	41	(8)
2010	Juan Aurich	10	(0)
2010	José Gálvez FBC	12	(3)

International career
1999	Peru U17	4	(0)
2001	Peru U20	3	(0)
2004	Peru U23	2	(0)

Managerial career
- 2017–2019: Sporting Cristal (reserves)
- 2019–2020: Sporting Cristal
- 2021: Deportivo Coopsol
- 2022: Universitario (youth)
- 2022: Universitario (interim)
- 2025: Universitario (interim)
- 2025: Peru (interim)
- * Club domestic league appearances and goals

Manuel Francisco Barreto Sayán (born 12 September 1982) is a Peruvian football coach and former player who played as a striker. He is the current sporting director of the Peruvian youth teams.

== Biography ==
=== Playing career ===
Barreto was born in Lima, Peru. He began his professional career at the age of 16 with Universitario de Deportes in 1998. Barreto's debut in the Peruvian First Division was against Lawn Tennis Fútbol Club, where he managed to score one of the four goals scored by Universitario that game. He had a short spell at APOEL on 2007, in which he won the Cypriot Championship.

He returned to Peru and signed with Universidad San Martín, winning the 2008 championship. He ended his playing career in 2010 with José Gálvez FBC.

=== Managerial career ===
After some coaching experiences at Sporting Cristal and Universitario de Deportes, Barreto was appointed interim manager of Peru in September 2025.

== Honours ==
Universitario de Deportes

- 1998 Torneo Descentralizado

APOEL FC

- 2006–07 Cypriot First Division

Universidad San Martín

- Torneo Descentralizado: 2008
