= Miguel Cevasco =

Peruvian footballer (born 1986)

Personal information
- Full name: Miguel Ángel Cevasco Abad
- Date of birth: 27 April 1986 (age 40)
- Place of birth: Lima, Peru
- Height: 1.78 m (5 ft 10 in)
- Position: Midfielder

Youth career
- 1998–2004: Universitario

Senior career*
Years	Team	Apps	(Gls)
2004–2008	Universitario	144	(3)
2009	Ironi Kiryat Shmona	9	(0)
2009–2010	Juan Aurich	30	(1)
2011	León de Huánuco	15	(0)
2012–2014	José Gálvez	48	(0)
2014	UTC	0	(0)
2015	Sport Victoria	9	(0)

International career
	Peru U20	15	(0)
2005–2008	Peru	9	(1)
- * Club domestic league appearances and goals

Miguel Ángel Cevasco Abad (born 27 April 1986) is a Peruvian former professional footballer who played as a midfielder.

== Club career ==
Cevasco began his career with Universitario de Deportes one of the most popular clubs in Peru. He played there from 2004 to 2008.

== International career ==
From 2005, Cevasco earned nine caps with the Peru national team and scored one goal.

== Honours ==
Universitario de Deportes

- Torneo Apertura: 2008
