= Roberto Jiménez (footballer, born 1983) =

Peruvian footballer

Personal information
- Full name: Roberto Carlos Jiménez Jiménez
- Date of birth: 17 April 1983 (age 43)
- Place of birth: Piura, Peru
- Height: 1.80 m (5 ft 11 in)
- Position: Forward

Senior career*
Years	Team	Apps	(Gls)
2003–2006	Alianza Atlético	118	(44)
2006–2010	San Lorenzo	25	(7)
2007	→ Lanús (loan)	8	(1)
2008	→ Universitario (loan)	47	(17)
2009	→ Godoy Cruz (loan)	11	(2)
2009	→ Sporting Cristal (loan)	22	(2)
2010	→ Deportes La Serena (loan)	14	(3)
2010	Alianza Atlético	18	(7)
2011	Unión Comercio	26	(17)
2012–2013	Universidad César Vallejo	42	(18)
2013	Unión Comercio	9	(2)
2014	Los Caimanes	35	(18)
2015–2016	Alianza Atlético	26	(11)
2016–2017	Defensor La Bocana	23	(4)
2017	Alianza Atlético	19	(3)
2018	Sport Loreto	5	(3)
2023	Semillero Tambogrande	–	(–)
Total		448	(159)

International career
2006–2008	Peru	6	(0)
- * Club domestic league appearances and goals

Roberto Carlos Jiménez Jiménez (born 17 April 1983) is a Peruvian former professional footballer who played as a forward.

== Career ==
Jiménez began his career in 2003 at Alianza Atlético in the Peruvian Primera División. In 2005, he moved to Argentina to play for San Lorenzo, which acquired his rights.

In 2007, Jiménez joined Club Atlético Lanús on a loan helping the team win the Apertura 2007 tournament, its first ever top-flight league title. In 2008, Jiménez was loaned to Peruvian club Universitario de Deportes. In 2009, he returned to play in the Argentine Primera División with recently promoted team Godoy Cruz. After six months in Mendoza, the loan ended and he was sent to Sporting Cristal. On 7 January 2010, Deportes La Serena signed the forwards from Club Atlético San Lorenzo de Almagro "Malingas" on a 50% joint ownership deal.

Jiménez returned to play football for club Semillero from Tambogrande in the Ligas Superiores del Peru in 2023.

== Personal life ==
Jiménez is nicknamed Malingas, like his hometown in Piura, Peru.

== Honours ==
Season	Club	Title
Clausura 2007	San Lorenzo	Primera División Argentina
Apertura 2007	Lanús	Primera División Argentina
Apertura 2008	Universitario	Primera División Peruana
