= Jesús Rabanal =

Peruvian footballer (born 1984)

Personal information
- Full name: Jesús Giancarlos Rabanal Dávila
- Date of birth: 25 December 1984 (age 41)
- Place of birth: Lima, Peru
- Height: 1.84 m (6 ft 0 in)
- Position: Left-back

Youth career
- Universitario

Senior career*
Years	Team	Apps	(Gls)
2004–2011	Universitario	146	(5)
2012	Alianza Lima	36	(3)
2013	Kairat	0	(0)
2013–2014	César Vallejo	30	(0)
2015–2016	Alianza Atlético	61	(3)
2017	Sport Rosario	28	(6)
2018–2019	Unión Comercio	46	(7)
2020	Carlos Stein	12	(1)
2021	Unión Huaral	19	(2)
2022	Alianza Universidad	8	(0)

International career
2010–2011	Perú	7	(0)
- * Club domestic league appearances and goals

Jesús Giancarlos Rabanal Dávila (born 25 December 1984) is a Peruvian former professional footballer who played as a left-back.

== Club career ==
Rabanal made his league debut with Universitario de Deportes in the 2004 Torneo Descentralizado season. He managed to score his first goal in the Torneo Descentralizado in the 2007 season.

In January 2012, Rabanal left Universitario and joined their rivals Alianza Lima for the start of the 2012 season.

== International career ==
Rabanal made his debut with the Peru national team on 4 September 2010 in a friendly match away to Canada, which finished in a 2–0 win for Peru.

== Honours ==
Universitario de Deportes

- Apertura: 2008
- Torneo Descentralizado: 2009
