= Mayer Candelo =

Colombian footballer and manager (born 1977)

Personal information
- Full name: Mayer Andrés Candelo García
- Date of birth: 20 February 1977 (age 49)
- Place of birth: Cali, Colombia
- Height: 1.69 m (5 ft 7 in)
- Position: Attacking midfielder

Youth career
- Deportivo Cali

Senior career*
Years	Team	Apps	(Gls)
1996–2000	Deportivo Cali	53	(14)
2000–2004	Vélez Sársfield	18	(1)
2001	→ América de Cali (loan)	7	(0)
2002	→ Cortuluá (loan)	15	(2)
2002–2003	→ Millonarios (loan)	34	(7)
2003–2004	→ Deportivo Cali (loan)	29	(6)
2004	→ Cortuluá (loan)	6	(1)
2005–2006	Deportivo Cali	13	(0)
2005	→ Deportes Tolima (loan)	16	(1)
2006	→ Universidad de Chile (loan)	21	(3)
2006–2010	Universitario	79	(15)
2009	→ Juan Aurich (loan)	38	(13)
2010	→ César Vallejo (loan)	30	(11)
2011–2015	Millonarios	189	(17)
2016	Cortuluá	22	(3)
2016–2017	Deportivo Cali	50	(4)
2018	Atlético Huila	15	(0)
2018–2019	Cortuluá	8	(0)
Total		643	(98)

International career
1999–2003	Colombia	11	(0)

Managerial career
- 2019: Cortuluá
- 2022: Deportivo Cali
- * Club domestic league appearances and goals

Mayer Andrés Candelo García (born 20 February 1977) is a Colombian former professional footballer who played as an attacking midfielder.

During a professional career spanning more than two decades, he played in Colombia, Argentina, Chile and Peru, and was capped by the Colombia national football team. He is particularly associated with Deportivo Cali, Millonarios and Universitario.

== Club career ==
Candelo developed in the youth system of Deportivo Cali and made his professional debut shortly before his 19th birthday. After a loan spell with Alianza Llanos, he returned to Cali and became part of the side that won the Colombian championship in 1998. In 1999, Candelo played a prominent role as Deportivo Cali reached the final of the 1999 Copa Libertadores, where the Colombian club was defeated by Palmeiras.

In 2000, Candelo moved abroad for the first time to join Argentine club Vélez Sarsfield, where he played alongside fellow Colombians Jairo Castillo and Julián Téllez. He subsequently returned to Colombia and represented América de Cali, Cortuluá, Millonarios and Deportivo Cali. Candelo won the Colombian championship with América in 2001.

After another spell with Deportivo Cali and a season with Deportes Tolima, Candelo moved to Chile in January 2006 to join Universidad de Chile. He made his league debut in a 2–1 victory over Universidad de Concepción, receiving praise for his performance in midfield.

Candelo helped Universidad de Chile reach the final of the 2006 Apertura. He scored in a 3–1 victory over Universidad Católica in the quarter-finals, and started the first leg of the final against Colo-Colo. The championship was eventually decided by a penalty shoot-out, in which goalkeeper Claudio Bravo saved Candelo's attempt as Colo-Colo won the title. He left Universidad de Chile following the tournament.

Days later, Candelo signed for Peruvian club Universitario. He established himself as a key player for the Lima club and was recognised in the Peruvian media for his performances during the 2006 season. In 2008, he helped Universitario win the Apertura tournament. Candelo scored from the penalty spot in the 3–1 victory over Cienciano that mathematically secured the championship.

Candelo remained in Peru after leaving Universitario, playing for Juan Aurich in 2009 and Universidad César Vallejo in 2010. He returned to Colombia in 2011 for a second spell with Millonarios, which became one of the longest periods of his career. As one of the team's senior players, he helped Millonarios win the Copa Colombia in 2011 and the 2012 Finalización, ending the club's 24-year wait for a Colombian league championship.

After leaving Millonarios, Candelo returned to Cortuluá and subsequently rejoined Deportivo Cali in 2016. By that stage, he had played more than 700 official matches during his professional career.

== International career ==
Candelo represented Colombia at youth and under-23 level before progressing to the senior national team. He made 12 appearances for the Colombia senior team between 1999 and 2003.

== Honours ==
Deportivo Cali

- 1998 Categoría Primera A season

Universitario de Deportes

- Apertura: 2008

Millonarios F.C.

- 2012 Categoría Primera A - Torneo Finalización
