= Óscar Ibáñez =

Peruvian football goalkeeper (born 1967)

Óscar Ibañez
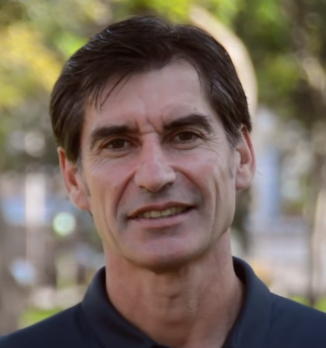
- Ibañez in 2016

Personal information
- Full name: Óscar Manuel Ibañez Holzmann
- Date of birth: 8 August 1967 (age 59)
- Place of birth: Roque Sáenz Peña, Argentina
- Height: 1.91 m (6 ft 3 in)
- Position: Goalkeeper

Youth career
- 1985: Deportivo Español

Senior career*
Years	Team	Apps	(Gls)
1986–1992	Arsenal de Sarandí	25	(0)
1993–1994	Carlos A. Mannucci	7	(0)
1995	Deportivo Municipal	43	(0)
1996–2002	Universitario	248	(0)
2003–2006	Cienciano	149	(0)
2007	Sport Boys	35	(0)
2008	Universitario	7	(0)
Total		514	(0)

International career
1998–2005	Peru	50	(0)

Managerial career
- 2014–2015: Universitario
- 2016: Cienciano
- 2017: Comerciantes Unidos
- 2018: Cusco FC
- 2023–2024: Cienciano
- 2025: Peru
- * Club domestic league appearances and goals

Óscar Manuel Ibáñez Holzmann (born 8 August 1967) is a football manager and former player who played as a goalkeeper. He was the caretaker manager of the Peru football team.

Born in Argentina, Ibáñez played for the Peruvian national team and made his debut for the national team on 18 April 1998. Since then he obtained 50 caps, with the last match being on 30 March 2005. He has been one of the four to have played at least 500 games in the Peruvian First Division. He is of Volga German and Basque descent.

== Career statistics ==
=== International ===
Appearances and goals by national team and year
National team	Year	Apps	Goals
Peru	1998	2	0
Peru	1999	11	0
Peru	2000	10	0
Peru	2001	5	0
Peru	2002	–	
Peru	2003	6	0
Peru	2004	14	0
Peru	2005	2	0
Total		50	0

== Honours ==
Universitario

- Peruvian Primera División: 1998, 1999, 2000
- Apertura: 2008

Cienciano

- Copa Sudamericana: 2003
- Recopa Sudamericana: 2004
