= Willy Rivas =

Peruvian footballer (born 1985)

Personal information
- Full name: Willy Alexander Rivas Asin
- Date of birth: 4 June 1985 (age 41)
- Place of birth: San Vicente de Cañete, Peru
- Height: 1.74 m (5 ft 9 in)
- Position: Right-back

Youth career
- Universitario

Senior career*
Years	Team	Apps	(Gls)
2003	América Cochahuayco		
2004	Unión de Campeones		
2005–2008	Universitario	57	(1)
2006–2007	→ Sport Áncash (loan)	32	(1)
2008	Górnik Zabrze	4	(0)
2009	Sport Áncash	22	(1)
2010	Juan Aurich	30	(0)
2010–2011	Irapuato	4	(0)
2011–2012	→ Sporting Cristal (loan)	8	(0)
2012	Universitario	8	(0)
2013	León de Huánuco	34	(0)
2014	Melgar	26	(0)
2015	León de Huánuco	28	(2)
2016–2017	Sport Huancayo	23	(2)
2017	Comerciantes Unidos	19	(1)
2017	Juan Aurich	4	(0)
2018	Sport Victoria	4	(0)
2018	Comerciantes Unidos	9	(0)
2019	Real Garcilaso	7	(0)
2020	Comerciantes Unidos	1	(0)

International career
2010	Peru	2	(0)
- * Club domestic league appearances and goals

Willy Alexander Rivas Asin (born 4 June 1985) is a Peruvian former professional footballer who played as a right-back.

== Club career ==
Rivas made his Descentralizado league debut in the 2005 season playing for Universitario de Deportes.

On 10 June 2011 it was announced that Rivas would join Sporting Cristal on loan for the rest of the 2011 season.
