= Natalio Portillo =

Argentine footballer (born 1979)

Personal information
- Full name: Natalio Wenceslao Portillo Herrera
- Date of birth: October 15, 1979 (age 46)
- Place of birth: Las Palmas, Chaco Province, Argentina
- Height: 1.77 m (5 ft 10 in)
- Position: Forward

Senior career*
| Years | Team | Apps | (Gls) |
| 2000–2001 | Ferro Carril Oeste | 13 | (0) |
| 2001 | Cortuluá | 16 | (0) |
| 2001–2002 | Ferro Carril Oeste | 8 | (2) |
| 2004 | Estudiantes de Medicina | 9 | (2) |
| 2005–2007 | Sport Áncash | ?? | (??) |
| 2007–2008 | Cienciano | 38 | (8) |
| 2008 | Atlético Minero | 40 | (8) |
| 2008 | Colegio Nacional Iquitos | 10 | (0) |
| 2010–2011 | Sport Áncash | ?? | (??) |
| 2012–2013 | José Gàlvez | ?? | (??) |
| 2012–2013 | Deportivo Municipal | 14 | (3) |
| 2014–???? | Atlético Minero | 14 | (3) |
- * Club domestic league appearances and goals

Natalio Wenceslao Portillo Herrera (born October 15, 1979) is an Argentine footballer currently playing for Atlético Minero of the Peruvian Segunda División.
