= Dimas Zegarra =

Peruvian footballer (1932–2023)

Personal information
- Full name: Dimas Darío Zegarra Castillo
- Date of birth: 19 December 1932
- Place of birth: Lima, Peru
- Date of death: 20 July 2023 (aged 90)
- Place of death: Lima (Peru)
- Position: Goalkeeper

Senior career*
Years	Team	Apps	(Gls)
1949–1950	Sporting Tabaco		
1951	Unión Callao		
1952–1966	Universitario	238	(0)
1967–?	Porvenir Miraflores		

International career
1956–1970	Peru	14	(0)
- * Club domestic league appearances and goals

Dimas Darío Zegarra Castillo (19 December 1932 – 20 July 2023) was a Peruvian professional footballer who played as goalkeeper.

== Playing career ==
=== Club career ===
Nicknamed Superman for his agility in goal, this great goalkeeper made a name for himself at Universitario de Deportes, where he played for 14 years, from 1952 to 1966. With 238 appearances for Universitario, Dimas Zegarra won the league title three times (1959, 1960, and 1964), in addition to playing 12 Copa Libertadores matches in 1961, 1965, and 1966.

In 1967, he signed with Porvenir Miraflores, a newly promoted second-division club. This was his last known club.

=== International career ===
With 14 appearances for the Peruvian national team between 1956 and 1970 (29 goals conceded), Dimas Zegarra notably played in the 1956 South American Championship in Uruguay where he was the starting goalkeeper for Peru (five matches played).

== Death ==
Dimas Zegarra died on 20 July 2023 at the age of 90.

== Honours ==
Universitario de Deportes

- Peruvian Primera División (3): 1959, 1960, 1964
