= Gary Correa =

Peruvian footballer (born 1990)

Personal information
- Full name: Gary Jeamsen Correa Gogin
- Date of birth: May 23, 1990 (age 36)
- Place of birth: Lima, Peru
- Height: 1.71 m (5 ft 7 in)
- Position: Left winger

Youth career
- Universitario

Senior career*
Years	Team	Apps	(Gls)
2007–2008	Universitario	10	(0)
2008	→ Melgar (loan)	12	(2)
2009	Universitario	8	(0)
2009–2010	Juan Aurich	13	(0)
2011	Melgar	4	(0)
2012–2013	Inti Gas	47	(5)
2013–2014	Cienciano	48	(15)
2015–2016	Real Garcilaso	34	(4)
2016	Comerciantes Unidos	13	(4)
2017–2018	U. San Martín	75	(12)
2019–2020	Universitario	18	(2)
2020	→ Atlético Grau (loan)	20	(2)
2021	Club Deportivo Los Chankas	12	(0)
2022	Juan Aurich	22	(4)
- * Club domestic league appearances and goals as of 18:11, 6 July 2020 (UTC)

Gary Jeamsen Correa Gogin (born May 23, 1990 in Lima, Peru) is a Peruvian footballer who plays as a left winger.

== International career ==
He was called to play for the Peru national under-17 football team and qualified for the 2007 FIFA U-17 World Cup in South Korea.

== Honours ==
Universitario de Deportes

- Apertura: 2008
- Torneo Descentralizado: 2009

Atlético Grau

- 2020 Supercopa Peruana
