= Javier Molina (footballer) =

Peruvian footballer (born 1985)

Personal information
- Full name: Fernando Javier Molina Arredondo
- Date of birth: November 17, 1985 (age 40)
- Place of birth: Lima, Peru
- Height: 1.64 m (5 ft 5 in)
- Position: Full back

Team information
- Current team: Deportivo Coopsol

Youth career
- Universitario

Senior career*
Years	Team	Apps	(Gls)
2005–2009	Universitario		
2009–2010	José Gálvez FBC	33	(0)
2011	Inti Gas Deportes	16	(1)
2012–	Deportivo Coopsol	0	(0)
- * Club domestic league appearances and goals as of 24 March 2012

Fernando Javier Molina Arredondo (born November 17, 1985, in Lima) is a Peruvian footballer who plays as a fullback. In 2011, he was a regular member of the starting line-up at Inti Gas under manager Humberto Osorio. He later played for Deportivo Coopsol.

== Honours ==
Universitario de Deportes:

- Torneo Apertura: 2008
