= Tomás Silva (footballer, born 1966) =

Uruguayan footballer

Personal information
- Full name: Tomás Dolimar Silva Reyes
- Date of birth: February 2, 1966 (age 60)
- Place of birth: Uruguay
- Height: 1.74 m (5 ft 8 1/2 in)
- Position: Midfielder

Senior career*
Years	Team	Apps	(Gls)
1986–1990	Nacional		
1991–1994	Universitario de Deportes		
- * Club domestic league appearances and goals

Tomás Silva (born February 2, 1966) is an ex-Uruguayan football former player.

He played in 2 championship winning teams for Universitario de Deportes in 1992 and 1993
