= Eduardo Esidio =

Brazilian footballer (born 1970)

José Eduardo Esidio
Personal information
- Date of birth: November 17, 1970 (age 55)
- Place of birth: São Paulo, Brazil
- Position: Forward

José Eduardo Esidio (born November 17, 1970) in São Paulo) is a Brazilian footballer.

He was the South American Top scorer in the year 2000 with 37 goals in 38 matches when playing for Peru's top team, Universitario de Deportes. He is also known for being the first professional footballer in the world to be diagnosed as HIV positive in 1998. After some controversy in Peru, he continued to play professionally. He also played for União São João, Botafogo de Ribeirão Preto, Juventus de São Paulo, Marília, Paulista and Uberlândia, among other teams.
