= Roberto Farfán =

Peruvian footballer (born 1973)

Personal information
- Full name: Roberto Carlos Farfán Quispe
- Date of birth: 16 December 1973 (age 52)
- Place of birth: Lima, Peru
- Height: 1.78 m (5 ft 10 in)
- Position: Forward

Senior career*
Years	Team	Apps	(Gls)
1994–1995	Ciclista Lima		
1996	Deportivo Municipal	26	(15)
1997–1998	Universitario	59	(26)
1999	PAE Veria	5	(0)
1999	Universitario	24	(7)
2000–2002	Alianza Lima	61	(23)
2003	Unión Huaral	6	(2)
2003	Sport Boys	5	(0)
2004–2005	Universitario	27	(3)
2006–2007	Deportivo Municipal	16	(4)
2007	Alianza Atlético	16	(3)
2008	Total Clean		
2008–2009	Alianza Atlético	31	(4)
2010	Cobresol		
2011	Atlético Torino		

International career
1996–1998	Peru	9	(3)
- * Club domestic league appearances and goals

Roberto Carlos Farfán Quispe (born 16 December 1973) is a Peruvian former footballer who last played as a striker for Atlético Torino.

Nicknamed La Foca (the seal), he is the uncle of Jefferson Farfán.

== Career ==
=== Club career ===
Roberto Farfán is one of the players who won league titles with both Universitario de Deportes and Alianza Lima, the two major rivals in Peruvian football. He was a Peruvian champion in 1998 and 1999 with the former and in 2001 with the latter.

In 1999, he moved to PAE Veria in Greece, his only experience outside of Peru.

He also had the opportunity to distinguish himself in the 2nd division with Deportivo Municipal, Total Clean and Cobresol, winning the second division championship with these three clubs in 2006, 2008 and 2010, respectively.

=== International career ===
Peruvian international Roberto Farfán earned nine caps between 1996 and 1998. He scored his first goal on his debut in a friendly match against Armenia on 20 June 1996 (a 4–0 victory). He scored two more goals for his national team.

== Honours ==
Universitario de Deportes

- Torneo Descentralizado (2): 1998, 1999

Alianza Lima

- Torneo Descentralizado: 2001

Deportivo Municipal

- Peruvian Segunda División: 2006

Total Clean

- Peruvian Segunda División: 2008

Cobresol

- Peruvian Segunda División: 2010
