= Luis Guadalupe =

Peruvian footballer (born 1976)

Personal information
- Full name: Luis Alberto Guadalupe Rivadeneyra
- Date of birth: April 3, 1976 (age 50)
- Place of birth: Chincha, Peru
- Height: 1.93 m (6 ft 4 in)
- Position: Centre-back

Youth career
- Yo Calidad
- 1989–1990: Cantolao
- 1991–1994: Universitario

Senior career*
Years	Team	Apps	(Gls)
1995–1999	Universitario	94	(10)
1999	Independiente	2	(0)
2000–2002	KV Mechelen	29	(3)
2003–2007	Universitario	94	(1)
2007	Veria	5	(0)
2008–2009	Juan Aurich	79	(1)
2010	León de Huánuco	39	(0)
2011–2012	Juan Aurich	48	(0)
2013	Real Garcilaso	40	(0)
2014	Universidad César Vallejo	34	(0)
2015	Los Caimanes	15	(0)
Total		479	(15)

International career
1996	Peru U-23	3	(1)
1996–2005	Peru	16	(0)

Managerial career
- 2017: Juan Aurich (assistant coach)
- * Club domestic league appearances and goals as of 18 September 2017

Luis Alberto Guadalupe (born April 3, 1976 in Chincha) is a retired football Peruvian footballer who played as a central defender

== Career ==
Guadalupe has played most of his career for the Universitario de Deportes club in Lima, Peru. He has also had spells with Independiente in Argentina, KV Mechelen in Belgium, and Veria FC in Greece.

Guadalupe made 16 appearances for the Peru national football team.

== Honours ==
=== Club ===
Universitario de Deportes

- Torneo Descentralizado (1): 1998

Juan Aurich

- Torneo Descentralizado (1): 2011
