= Rainer Torres =

Peruvian footballer (born 1980)

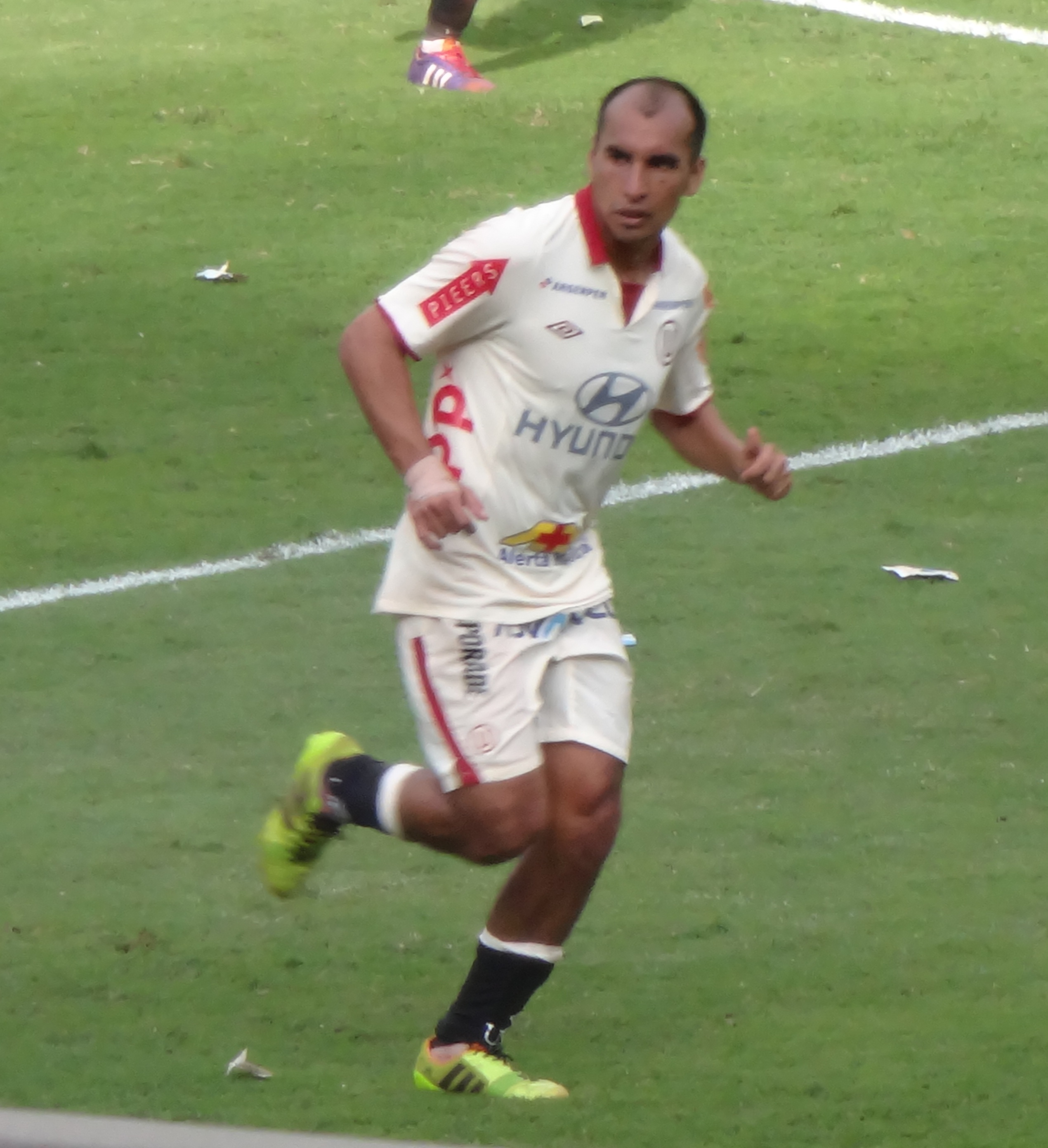
- Torres in 2013

Personal information
- Full name: Rainer Torres Salas
- Date of birth: 12 January 1980 (age 46)
- Place of birth: Callao, Peru
- Height: 1.69 m (5 ft 7 in)
- Position: Midfielder

Youth career
- 1988–1990: Academia Cantolao
- 1991–1993: Sport Boys
- 1993–1999: MSV Duisburg

Senior career*
Years	Team	Apps	(Gls)
1999–2001	MSV Duisburg	5	(0)
2002	DSV Leoben	26	(2)
2003	Universitario	7	(0)
2004–2007	Sporting Cristal	120	(3)
2008–2014	Universitario	205	(10)
2015	Melgar	28	(1)
2016	Sport Boys	7	(0)
Total		427	(16)

International career
2005–2010	Peru	28	(0)

Managerial career
- 2016: Sport Boys
- 2017: Sport Rosario
- 2018: Serrato
Medal record
Sporting Cristal
Winner	Peruvian League	2005
Universitario
Winner	Peruvian League	2009
Winner	Peruvian League	2013
Melgar
Winner	Peruvian League	2015
- * Club domestic league appearances and goals

Rainer Torres Salas (born 12 January 1980) is a Peruvian football manager and former player who most recently managed Serrato Pacasmayo.

== Career ==
Torres began in Academia Cantolao and Sport Boys. He moved to Europe to play for the German club MSV Duisburg and Austrian club DSV Leoben. He returned to Peru to play for Universitario. Problems between Torres and the directors of the club caused him to sign with Sporting Cristal where he would play for four seasons and win one national championship. He returned to Universitario in 2008 but was unable to play in the first seven games of the season because of an injury in preseason.

Torres made 28 appearances for the Peru national team.

In August 2016, he announced his retirement from football.

== Honors ==
Sporting Cristal

- Torneo Descentralizado: 2005

Universitario de Deportes

- Torneo Descentralizado: 2009, 2013

FBC Melgar

- Torneo Descentralizado: 2015
