= Gregorio Bernales =

Peruvian footballer (born 1976)

Personal information
- Full name: Gregorio Abel Bernales Francia
- Date of birth: 8 November 1976 (age 49)
- Place of birth: Lima, Peru
- Height: 1.78 m (5 ft 10 in)
- Position: Midfielder

Team information
- Current team: Universitario (interim)

Senior career*
Years	Team	Apps	(Gls)
1996–1998	Deportivo Wanka	88	(2)
1999–2002	Universitario	267	(26)
2002–2003	Sporting Cristal	42	(2)
2004–2007	Universitario		
2007	Total Clean	11	(0)
2008	Universitario	38	(0)
2009–2010	Total Clean	61	(2)
2011–2012	Cobresol	17	(0)

International career
1998–2003	Peru	9	(0)
- * Club domestic league appearances and goals

Gregorio Abel Bernales Francia (born November 8, 1976, in Lima, Peru) is a Peruvian retired footballer who played as a midfielder.

== Career ==
At the club level, Bernales played for Universitario de Deportes. He was part of the squad that became tri-champions in 2000.

Bernales has also made nine appearances for the Peru national football team.

== Honours ==
Universitario de Deportes

- Peruvian Primera División: 1999, 2000
- Apertura: 2008

Sporting Cristal

- Torneo Descentralizado: 2002
