= Héctor Hurtado =

Colombian footballer (born 1975)

Personal information
- Full name: Héctor Hugo Hurtado Salazar
- Date of birth: September 21, 1975 (age 51)
- Place of birth: Tuluá, Colombia
- Height: 1.75 m (5 ft 9 in)
- Position: Striker

Senior career*
Years	Team	Apps	(Gls)
1998–1999	América de Cali	23	(5)
1999–2002	Internacional	11	(2)
2002	→ Cortuluá (loan)	26	(8)
2002–2006	Atlético Nacional	187	(30)
2006	Independiente Santa Fe	14	(1)
2007–2011	Universitario de Deportes	70	(23)
2009	→ Sporting Cristal (loan)	37	(20)
2010–2011	→ Univ César Vallejo (loan)	46	(26)
2012–2013	América de Cali	46	(8)

International career
1999–2005	Colombia	18	(3)
- * Club domestic league appearances and goals as of 12 December 2012

Héctor Hugo Hurtado Salazar (born 21 September 1975) is a former Colombian football striker who last played for América de Cali.

When he retired from his career as a professional player in 2014 he became a sports technician.

== Career ==
On April 13, 2008, he scored his first career hat-trick against Sport Boys. Universitario won the fixture 5-1.

== Statistics ==
- Universitario Statistics: 2007 Apertura

Games	Goals
11	1

- Universitario Statistics: 2007 Clausura

Games	Goals
17	6

- Universitario Statistics: 2008 Apertura

Games	Goals
24	12

- Universitario Statistics: 2008 Clausura

Games	Goals
18	4

== International ==
Hurtado played for the Colombia national team between 1999 and 2005.

== Honours ==
Universitario de Deportes

- Apertura: 2008
