= Juan Flores (footballer, born 1976) =

Peruvian footballer

Personal information
- Full name: Juan Ángel Flores Ascencio
- Date of birth: 25 February 1976 (age 50)
- Place of birth: Lima, Peru
- Height: 1.92 m (6 ft 3 1/2 in)
- Position: Goalkeeper

Senior career*
| Years | Team | Apps | (Gls) |
| 1994–1995 | Deportivo Zúñiga | | |
| 1996 | Ciclista Lima | 11 | (0) |
| 1997–1998 | Sport Boys | 50 | (0) |
| 1999–2001 | Universitario | 25 | (0) |
| 2001 | Estudiantes de Medicina | 21 | (0) |
| 2002 | Juan Aurich | 33 | (0) |
| 2003 | Estudiantes de Medicina | 21 | (0) |
| 2003–2006 | Universitario | 124 | (2) |
| 2007–2008 | Cienciano | 49 | (1) |
| 2008 | Atlético Minero | 24 | (1) |
| 2009 | Total Chalaco | 35 | (0) |
| 2010–2012 | León de Huánuco | 101 | (0) |
| 2013 | Unión Comercio | 8 | (0) |
| 2014 | Atlético Minero | 24 | (0) |
| 2015 | Sport Victoria | 17 | (0) |
| 2016 | Unión Tarapoto | 1 | (0) |
| Total | | 544 | (4) |

International career^{‡}
| 1999–2007 | Peru | 6 | (0) |
- * Club domestic league appearances and goals as of 19 April 2013 ‡ National team caps and goals as of 12 November 2011

Juan Ángel Flores Ascencio (born 25 February 1976 in Lima) is a Peruvian footballer who played as a goalkeeper.

== Club career ==
Flores made his league debut in the Torneo Descentralizado in the 1996 season playing for Ciclista Lima.
