= Adrián Coria (footballer) =

Argentine footballer

Personal information
- Full name: Adrián Coria
- Date of birth: 23 May 1977 (age 49)
- Place of birth: Buenos Aires, Argentina
- Position: Forward

Senior career*
Years	Team	Apps	(Gls)
1994–1997	Platense		
1998	San Lorenzo		
1999–2000	Universitario		
2001	Almagro		
2002	Comunicaciones		
2003	Gimnasia Jujuy		
2004	Chaco For Ever		
2005	Miramar Misiones		
2005	12 de Octubre		
2006	Mitre (SdE)		
2006	Marathón		
2006–2007	Douglas Haig		
2008–2009	Sportivo Desamparados		
2009–present	Juventud Unida		
- * Club domestic league appearances and goals

Adrián Coria (born 23 May 1977) is an Argentine footballer currently playing as a forward for Juventud Unida de Gualeguaychú of the Torneo Argentino B in Argentina.

== Honours ==
Universitario

- Torneo Apertura: 1999

== Sources ==
- Adrián Coria at BDFA (in Spanish)
