= Gustavo Vassallo (footballer) =

Peruvian footballer (born 1978)

Personal information
- Full name: Gustavo Enrique Vassallo Ferrari
- Date of birth: September 6, 1978 (age 48)
- Place of birth: Lambayeque, Peru
- Height: 1.88 m (6 ft 2 in)
- Position: Forward

Senior career*
| Years | Team | Apps | (Gls) |
| 1998–1999 | Sporting Cristal | 11 | (3) |
| 1999 | Juan Aurich | 21 | (9) |
| 2000 | Sporting Cristal | 6 | (0) |
| 2000-2003 | AS Roma | 0 | (0) |
| 2000–2001 | → Nice (loan) | 12 | (2) |
| 2001 | → Gent (loan) | 1 | (0) |
| 2001–2002 | → Palermo (loan) | 1 | (0) |
| 2003–2004 | Alcalá | 12 | (2) |
| 2004–2005 | Sport Boys | 56 | (23) |
| 2006 | Sporting Cristal | 31 | (9) |
| 2007 | Universitario | 24 | (4) |
| 2008 | Cienciano | 21 | (11) |
| 2008 | Emelec | 6 | (0) |
| 2009 | Juan Aurich | 0 | (0) |
| 2009 | Sport Áncash | 17 | (2) |
| 2011 | Univ. San Marcos | 22 | (11) |
| 2012 | Deportivo Coopsol | 18 | (6) |
| 2013 | C.D. Pacífico | 14 | (2) |

International career^{‡}
| 2005–2006 | Peru | 5 | (3) |
- * Club domestic league appearances and goals as of January 10, 2013 ‡ National team caps and goals as of 2 February 2009

Gustavo Enrique Vassallo Ferrari (born September 6, 1978 in Chiclayo) is a Peruvian footballer who plays as a forward.

== Club career ==
He has played for Sporting Cristal, Sport Boys, Universitario de Deportes, Cienciano del Cuzco and Juan Aurich.

== International career ==
Vassallo has made five appearances for the Peru national football team.

== Honours ==
=== Club ===
Sporting Cristal

- Torneo Clausura: 1998

=== Country ===
Peru national team

- Kirin Cup (1): 2005
