= Claudio Velásquez =

Argentine footballer

Personal information
- Full name: Claudio Matías Velásquez
- Date of birth: February 18, 1986 (age 40)
- Place of birth: Rosario, Argentina
- Height: 1.80 m (5 ft 11 in)
- Position: Striker

Team information
- Current team: Llacuabamba
- Number: 9

Youth career
- Rosario Central

Senior career*
Years	Team	Apps	(Gls)
2006–2010	Rosario Central	10	(0)
2008	→ José Gálvez (loan)	36	(26)
2009–2010	→ Alianza Lima (loan)	46	(14)
2011	Cobresol	23	(10)
2012	César Vallejo	38	(10)
2013	José Gálvez	22	(6)
2014	América de Cali	14	(2)
2014	Independiente Rivadavia	9	(1)
2015–2016	Willy Serrato	39	(14)
2016	La Emilia	1	(0)
2017	Los Caimanes	12	(7)
2017	Jaguares de Córdoba	1	(0)
2018–2019	Los Caimanes	36	(10)
2021–	Llacuabamba	18	(5)
- * Club domestic league appearances and goals as of 14:45, 1 August 2021 (UTC)

Claudio Matías Velásquez (born 18 February 1986 in Rosario) is an Argentine football striker who currently plays for Deportivo Llacuabamba.

Velásquez started his professional playing career in 2006 with Rosario Central in a 3–0 win over Tiro Federal.
