= Mauro Cantoro =

Argentine footballer (born 1976)

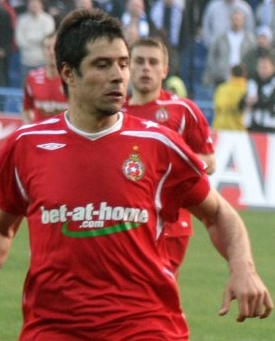

Personal information
- Full name: Roberto Mauro Cantoro
- Date of birth: 1 September 1976 (age 50)
- Place of birth: Ramos Mejia, Argentina
- Height: 1.79 m (5 ft 10 in)
- Position: Defensive midfielder

Youth career
- Vélez Sársfield

Senior career*
| Years | Team | Apps | (Gls) |
| 1994–2000 | Vélez Sársfield | 8 | (0) |
| 1997 | → Atlético de Rafaela (loan) | | (6) |
| 1998 | → Universitario (loan) | 30 | (13) |
| 1999 | → Universitario (loan) | 20 | (9) |
| 2000 | → Blooming (loan) | 7 | (2) |
| 2000 | Atlético de Rafaela | | (3) |
| 2001 | Ascoli | 9 | (2) |
| 2001–2009 | Wisła Kraków | 164 | (10) |
| 2010 | Odra Wodzisław | 12 | (0) |
| 2010–2011 | Juventud Antoniana | | |
| 2011–2013 | Deportivo Morón | | |
| 2013–2014 | Pacífico | | |
| 2014 | Unión Comercio | 36 | (7) |
| 2014 | Atlético Minero | 7 | (0) |
| 2015 | León de Huánuco | 5 | (0) |

International career
| 1993 | Argentina U17 | | |
- * Club domestic league appearances and goals

Roberto Mauro Cantoro (born 1 September 1976 in Ramos Mejia, La Matanza Partido, Argentina), nicknamed El Toro, is an Argentine former professional footballer who played as a midfielder.

He also has Italian and Polish citizenship.

== Personal life ==
Having previously gained Italian citizenship, after several years spent in Poland, he gained Polish citizenship in 2008 at the age of 31. His maternal grandfather, Bazyli Wolczak, born 1901, emigrated to Argentina from Galicja at the age of 14.

He married Adrianna, a woman he met in 1990 on a beach in Mar de la Plata. He has two sons; Mauro and Tiago, who both were born and grew up in Poland.

He is fluent in Polish, Spanish, Portuguese, and Italian.

== Club career ==
Cantoro started his career at Club Atlético Vélez Sársfield in the Primera Division Argentina in 1994. After three years of limited appearances in the first team he moved to Atlético Rafaela of the Argentine 2nd division for the Clausura 1997 season.

In 1998 and 1999, Cantoro played for Universitario de Deportes of Peru before having short spells with Club Blooming of Bolivia and Ascoli in Italy. He joined Wisła Kraków in 2001, where he became one of the most widely recognised players in the country, and a club icon.

He then joined strugglers Odra Wodzisław in 2010 after leaving Wisła in 2009, however his stay was short-lived.

He returned to South America as his career was nearing its end, where he played for several Argentine lower division clubs. However, he then moved to Peru, where he played for several top-flight clubs.

== International career ==
Cantoro played for the Argentina U17s in the 1993 FIFA Under-17 World Cup. After receiving a Polish passport in 2008, he was a contender to be called up to the national squad, however the nationality switch never materialised, partly due to the fact he had previously made an appearance for Argentina at youth level.

== Honours ==
Universitario de Deportes

- Primera División Peruana Apertura: 1998
- Primera División Peruana: 1998, 1999

Wisła Kraków

- Ekstraklasa: 2002–03, 2003–04, 2004–05, 2007–08, 2008–09
- Polish Cup: 2001–02, 2002–03

=== Individual ===
- Ekstraklasa Midfielder of the Year: 2004
