= Donny Neyra =

Peruvian footballer (born 1984)

Personal information
- Full name: Donny Renzo Neyra Ferrada
- Date of birth: 12 January 1984 (age 42)
- Place of birth: Lima, Peru
- Height: 1.78 m (5 ft 10 in)
- Position: Central midfielder

Youth career
- Academia Cantolao

Senior career*
Years	Team	Apps	(Gls)
1999–2001	Lanús	0	(0)
2002	Sport Boys	5	(0)
2003	Lanús	26	(2)
2004	Coronel Bolognesi	40	(2)
2005–2008	Universitario	153	(27)
2009	José Gálvez	14	(1)
2009	Total Chalaco	8	(3)
2010	Alianza Lima	20	(3)
2011	Cobresol	21	(3)
2012	Alianza Lima	22	(1)
2013	UT Cajamarca	22	(1)
2014	Melgar	13	(1)
2015	Sport Loreto	19	(2)
2016	UT Cajamarca	40	(4)
2017	Carlos A. Mannucci	7	(1)

International career
2008	Peru	4	(0)
- * Club domestic league appearances and goals

Donny Renzo Neyra Ferrada (born 12 January 1984) is a Peruvian former professional footballer who played as a central midfielder.

== International career ==
Neyra made his debut for the Peru national team on 26 March 2008 in a friendly match against Costa Rica, Peru 3–1. His last appearance for Peru was on 15 June 2008 in a World Cup Qualifier match against Colombia, 1–1 draw.

== Honours ==
Universitario de Deportes

- Apertura: 2008
