= Jorge Araujo =

Peruvian football defender (born 1979)

Personal information
- Full name: Jorge Martín Araujo Paredes
- Date of birth: 30 November 1979 (age 46)
- Place of birth: Lima, Peru
- Height: 1.86 m (6 ft 1 in)
- Position: Defender

Team information
- Current team: Juan Pablo II College (manager)

Youth career
- 1990–1997: Universitario

Senior career*
Years	Team	Apps	(Gls)
1998–2002	Universitario	113	(5)
2002–2005	Alianza Atlético	121	(2)
2006	Cienciano	2	(0)
2006	José Gálvez	18	(0)
2007	Sport Boys	21	(0)
2008	Universitario	37	(1)
2009	Total Clean	34	(1)
2010	Juan Aurich	30	(0)
2011–2012	León de Huánuco	40	(2)
2013–2014	Sport Boys	52	(2)
2015	Cienciano	28	(1)
2016–2017	Cantolao	37	(2)

International career
2003	Peru	1	(0)

Managerial career
- 2018: Cantolao (assistant)
- 2019: Cantolao
- 2021–2026: Universitario (reserves)
- 2022: Universitario (interim)
- 2023: Universitario (interim)
- 2026: Universitario (interim)
- 2026–: Juan Pablo II College
- * Club domestic league appearances and goals

Jorge Martín Araujo Paredes (born 30 November 1979) is a Peruvian football coach and former player who played as a defender. He is the current manager of Juan Pablo II College.

== Career ==
Born in Lima, Araujo has played over 100 games for both Universitario de Deportes and Alianza Atlético. He was also a member of the Peruvian national team on one occasion in 2003.

== Coaching career ==
On 29 January 2018, Araujo was appointed assistant manager of his last club, Academia Deportiva Cantolao. In December 2018 it was then confirmed, that he would be the club's head coach for the 2019 season. He was fired at the end of 2019.
