= 2008 Torneo Descentralizado =

Torneo Descentralizado
- Season: 2008
- Dates: 16 February 2008 – 17 December 2008
- Champions: Universidad San Martín; 2nd Primera División title
- Runner up: Universitario de Deportes
- Relegated: Sport Boys; Atlético Minero
- Copa Libertadores: Universitario de Deportes (Second stage); Universidad San Martín (Second stage); Sporting Cristal (First stage)
- Copa Sudamericana: Cienciano (First stage); Alianza Atlético (First stage)
- Goals: 893
- Average goals/game: 2.45
- Top goalscorer: Miguel Ximénez (32 goals)
- Biggest home win: Universidad San Martín 5-0 Alianza Lima (2008-05-21); Atlético Minero 5-0 Sport Boys (2008-08-06); José Gálvez 5-0 Sport Boys (2008-09-14)
- Biggest away win: Coronel Bolognesi 0-4 Alianza Atlético (2008-08-06)
- Highest scoring: Coronel Bolognesi 4–4 Sport Áncash (2008-12-14)
- Longest winning run: 9 - Universitario de Deportes (April 30-July 2)
- Longest unbeaten run: 15 - Universitario de Deportes (April 9-July 13)

The 2008 Torneo Descentralizado (known as the Copa Cable Mágico for sponsorship reasons) was the ninety-second season of Peruvian football. A total of 14 teams competed in the tournament, with Universidad San Martín defending their national title. The season began on February 17, 2008 and ended on December 14, 2008.

== Competition modus ==
The season was divided into two tournaments; Torneo Apertura from February to July and the Torneo Clausura from July to December. Both tournaments had the fourteen teams play a round-robin home-and-away round for a total of 26 matches in each tournament. The winner of the Torneo Apertura qualified to the 2009 Copa Libertadores group stage and was eligible to play in the season final if they finished above 8th place in the Torneo Clausura. The winner of the Torneo Clausura also qualified to the group stage and was eligible to play in the season final if they finished above 8th place in the Torneo Apertura. A team that would've won both tournament was automatically season champion. If one of the tournament winners failed to place above 8th place, the other tournament winner would've been season champion. If both teams failed to finish above 8th place, the team that placed higher on the aggregate table–the summation of the points earned in both tournaments–would've been season champion. The two teams that placed last on the aggregate table were relegated and the best placed team–excluding the two tournament winners–qualified to the first stage of the 2009 Copa Libertadores. The second and third best placed teams on the aggregate table qualified to the 2009 Copa Sudamericana.

== Changes from 2007 ==
=== Structural changes ===
- The number of teams was increased from 12 to 14.
- Due to the increase in teams, the tournament winners could finish in the top seven instead of the top six to play in the season finals.
- 1,170 minutes of game time was to be accumulated by players born on or after 1989 in the Torneo Apertura and Torneo Clausura. The amount for the Torneo Clausura was later reduced to 600.
- The minimum stadium capacity was increased from 4,000 to 5,000.

=== Promotion and relegation ===
Deportivo Municipal and Total Clean finished the 2007 season in 11th and 12th place, respectively, in the aggregate table and thus were relegated to the Segunda División. They were replaced by the champions of the Segunda División 2007 and Copa Perú 2007, Universidad César Vallejo and Juan Aurich. The F.P.F. also invited José Gálvez and Minero into the first division.

=== Team changes ===
| Promoted from 2007 Segunda División | Promoted from 2007 Copa Perú | Reinstated | Relegated from 2007 Primera División |
|---|---|---|---|
| ▲ Universidad César Vallejo (1st) ▲ Atlético Minero (2nd) | ▲ Juan Aurich (1st) | ▲ José Gálvez | ▼ Deportivo Municipal (11th) ▼ Total Clean (12th) |

== Season overview ==
Universitario won the Apertura title after 6 years of failing to win a half-year tournament. They won the title with 50 points, a ten-point lead, and had four games left to be played. Sporting Cristal was the other team close to winning the title, however they had three games left to play and would have been unable to reach Universitario. Universitario had a 15-game undefeated streak and a 9-game winning streak. In the Clausura Universitario did surprisingly worse and finished 11th. They lost four games at home and failed to finish in the top 7 to contest the national title. U. San Martin finished third in the Apertura and won the Clausura with three games to spare. They achieved their second national title after only four years of existence. This is the first time since 1958 where the big three were not able to win the title for two consecutive years.

Alianza Lima experienced a terrible season because they were close to being relegated this season. Every team, with the exception of José Gálvez, gained points playing at their home ground and they had also lost several home games. Fortunately, Alianza Lima remained in the First Division. Sport Boys saved itself from relegation two years ago, however this year they could not. They were the worst team of the year and won very few games. Problems arose in the club as the players were not paid for many months. This led to a sorrowful year for the fans of Sport Boys.

== Teams ==
Locations of the 2008 Primera División teams

| Team | City | Stadium | Capacity | Field |
|---|---|---|---|---|
| Alianza Atlético | Sullana | Campeones del 36 | 8,000 | Grass |
| Alianza Lima | Lima | Alejandro Villanueva | 35,000 | Grass |
| Atlético Minero | Matucana | Municipal de Matucana | 5,000 | Grass |
| Cienciano | Cusco | Garcilaso | 42,056 | Grass |
| Coronel Bolognesi | Tacna | Jorge Basadre | 19,850 | Grass |
| José Gálvez | Chimbote | Manuel Rivera Sanchez | 25,000 | Artificial |
| Juan Aurich | Chiclayo | Elías Aguirre | 24,500 | Artificial |
| Melgar | Arequipa | Mariano Melgar | 20,000 | Grass |
| Sport Áncash | Huaraz | Rosas Pampa | 8,000 | Grass |
| Sport Boys | Callao | Miguel Grau | 15,000 | Grass |
| Sporting Cristal | Lima | San Martín de Porres | 18,000 | Grass |
| Universidad César Vallejo | Trujillo | Mansiche | 25,000 | Artificial |
| Universidad San Martín | Lima | San Martín de Porres | 18,000 | Grass |
| Universitario | Lima | Monumental | 80,093 | Grass |

== Torneo Apertura ==
=== Standings ===
| Pos | Team | Pld | W | D | L | GF | GA | GD | Pts | Qualification |
|---|---|---|---|---|---|---|---|---|---|---|
| 1 | Universitario | 26 | 16 | 7 | 3 | 40 | 21 | +19 | 55 | 2009 Copa Libertadores second stage |
| 2 | Sporting Cristal | 26 | 15 | 4 | 7 | 46 | 32 | +14 | 49 | |
| 3 | Universidad San Martín | 26 | 11 | 10 | 5 | 40 | 20 | +20 | 43 | |
| 4 | Cienciano | 26 | 12 | 5 | 9 | 37 | 28 | +9 | 41 | |
| 5 | Coronel Bolognesi | 26 | 10 | 8 | 8 | 33 | 28 | +5 | 38 | |
| 6 | Alianza Atlético | 26 | 10 | 4 | 12 | 28 | 28 | 0 | 34 | |
| 7 | Universidad César Vallejo | 26 | 9 | 7 | 10 | 26 | 32 | −6 | 34 | |
| 8 | Juan Aurich | 26 | 9 | 6 | 11 | 27 | 30 | −3 | 33 | |
| 9 | José Gálvez | 26 | 7 | 9 | 10 | 26 | 32 | −6 | 30 | |
| 10 | Melgar | 26 | 7 | 9 | 10 | 18 | 25 | −7 | 30 | |
| 11 | Alianza Lima | 26 | 7 | 8 | 11 | 27 | 32 | −5 | 29 | |
| 12 | Sport Áncash | 26 | 9 | 2 | 15 | 25 | 36 | −11 | 29 | |
| 13 | Sport Boys | 26 | 7 | 8 | 11 | 23 | 42 | −19 | 27 (Note: Sport Boys were docked 2 points for an outstanding debt with a former manager.) | |
| 14 | Atlético Minero | 26 | 6 | 7 | 13 | 26 | 36 | −10 | 25 | |

Source: Peruvian Football Apertura 2008

=== Results ===
| Home \ Away | AAS | ALI | ATM | CIE | BOL | MEL | JG | JA | ÁNC | SBA | CRI | UCV | USM | UNI |
|---|---|---|---|---|---|---|---|---|---|---|---|---|---|---|
| Alianza Atlético | | 0–1 | 3–1 | 1–0 | 1–4 | 3–0 | 3–0 | 1–1 | 3–0 | 0–0 | 1–2 | 1–3 | 1–1 | 1–0 |
| Alianza Lima | 0–1 | | 4–1 | 0–0 | 0–1 | 0–0 | 3–0 | 0–1 | 1–0 | 1–1 | 1–3 | 2–1 | 0–1 | 1–1 |
| Atlético Minero | 0–0 | 0–0 | | 2–2 | 3–1 | 0–0 | 2–1 | 1–0 | 3–0 | 3–0 | 3–1 | 0–0 | 1–1 | 0–2 |
| Cienciano | 1–0 | 3–2 | 1–0 | | 1–3 | 1–0 | 3–0 | 3–2 | 3–0 | 1–0 | 4–0 | 4–1 | 0–0 | 4–1 |
| Coronel Bolognesi | 1–2 | 1–0 | 2–1 (Note: Played in Estadio Héroes del Alto de la Alianza.) | 0–1 | | 1–1 | 1–1 | 3–1 | 2–1 | 3–0 | 0–2 | 1–1 | 1–2 | 1–1 |
| Melgar | 1–0 | 1–1 | 1–1 | 1–0 | 1–1 | | 1–0 | 2–1 | 0–2 | 1–1 | 1–0 | 1–1 | 2–1 | 0–1 |
| José Gálvez | 1–0 | 1–1 | 1–0 | 1–1 | 0–0 | 2–1 | | 4–0 | 1–0 | 3–2 | 1–2 | 2–2 | 0–2 | 0–1 |
| Juan Aurich | 0–2 | 1–2 | 1–0 | 1–0 | 2–0 | 1–0 | 0–0 | | 3–0 | 3–0 | 1–0 | 0–0 | 1–0 | 1–1 |
| Sport Áncash | 2–1 | 1–0 | 1–0 | 3–3 | 1–2 | 0–2 | 0–0 | 3–2 | | 4–0 | 1–2 | 1–0 | 1–0 | 0–1 |
| Sport Boys | 0–1 | 2–1 | 2–1 | 1–0 | 1–3 | 0–0 | 0–0 | 1–0 | 2–1 | | 1–1 | 3–1 | 2–2 | 2–1 |
| Sporting Cristal | 3–1 | 2–2 (Note: Played in Estadio Nacional.) | 4–1 | 1–0 | 1–1 | 2–1 | 3–2 | 1–1 | 2–1 | 5–1 | | 3–0 | 3–4 | 1–2 |
| Universidad César Vallejo | 2–0 | 2–3 | 2–1 | 1–0 | 2–0 | 1–0 | 0–2 | 2–1 | 0–1 | 1–0 | 0–1 | | 3–1 | 0–0 |
| Universidad San Martín | 2–0 | 5–0 (Note: Played in Estadio Miguel Grau.) | 4–0 | 3–0 | 0–0 | 2–0 | 1–1 | 1–1 | 1–0 | 0–0 | 0–1 | 4–0 | | 1–1 |
| Universitario | 2–1 | 2–1 | 2–1 | 3–1 | 1–0 | 2–0 | 3–2 | 3–1 | 2–0 | 5–1 | 1–0 | 0–0 | 1–1 | |

Updated to match(es) played on June 25, 2008. Source: Peruvian Football Apertura 2008 Fixture
Legend: Blue = home team win; Yellow = draw; Red = away team win.

=== Top goalscorers ===
20 goals

- (Uruguay) Miguel Ximénez (Sporting Cristal)

13 goals

- (Peru) Juan Gonzáles-Vigil (Bolognesi)

12 goals

- (Colombia) Jamie Ruiz (Alianza Atlético)
- (Colombia) Héctor Hurtado (Universitario)

11 goals

- (Peru) Wilmer Aguirre (Alianza Lima)
- (Peru) Gustavo Vassallo (Cienciano)
- (Peru) Germán Carty (Sport Áncash)

9 goals

- (Peru) Donny Neyra (Universitario)
- (Peru) Carlos Lobaton (Sporting Cristal)
- (Peru) Pedro García (U. San Martín)
- (Paraguay) Carlos Alberto Pérez (Sport Boys)

== Torneo Clausura ==
=== Standings ===
| Pos | Team | Pld | W | D | L | GF | GA | GD | Pts | Qualification |
|---|---|---|---|---|---|---|---|---|---|---|
| 1 | Universidad San Martín | 26 | 15 | 6 | 5 | 41 | 20 | +21 | 51 | 2009 Copa Libertadores Second Stage |
| 2 | Sporting Cristal | 26 | 14 | 3 | 9 | 36 | 25 | +11 | 45 | |
| 3 | Sport Áncash | 26 | 12 | 7 | 7 | 39 | 29 | +10 | 43 | |
| 4 | Melgar | 26 | 11 | 7 | 8 | 35 | 34 | +1 | 40 | |
| 5 | Cienciano | 26 | 11 | 6 | 9 | 34 | 30 | +4 | 39 | |
| 6 | Alianza Atlético | 26 | 10 | 8 | 8 | 35 | 25 | +10 | 38 | |
| 7 | Universidad César Vallejo | 26 | 11 | 5 | 10 | 35 | 32 | +3 | 38 | |
| 8 | Atlético Minero | 26 | 9 | 10 | 7 | 32 | 26 | +6 | 37 | |
| 9 | José Gálvez | 26 | 10 | 7 | 9 | 42 | 38 | +4 | 37 | |
| 10 | Alianza Lima | 26 | 11 | 1 | 14 | 38 | 36 | +2 | 34 | |
| 11 | Universitario | 26 | 8 | 10 | 8 | 31 | 32 | −1 | 34 | |
| 12 | Juan Aurich | 26 | 8 | 5 | 13 | 24 | 34 | −10 | 29 | |
| 13 | Coronel Bolognesi | 26 | 7 | 5 | 14 | 34 | 51 | −17 | 26 | |
| 14 | Sport Boys | 26 | 1 | 8 | 17 | 18 | 54 | −36 | 11 | |

Updated to match(es) played on December 14, 2008. Source:
Rules for classification: 1) points; 2) goal difference; 3) number of goals scored.

=== Results ===
| Home \ Away | AAS | ALI | ATM | CIE | BOL | MEL | JG | JA | ÁNC | SBA | CRI | UCV | USM | UNI |
|---|---|---|---|---|---|---|---|---|---|---|---|---|---|---|
| Alianza Atlético | | 1–0 | 2–0 | 3–0 | 2–0 | 1–1 | 3–2 | 1–1 | 1–3 | 4–0 | 1–2 | 0–1 | 1–2 | 1–1 |
| Alianza Lima | 1–2 | | 1–2 | 2–0 | 1–2 | 2–1 | 2–1 | 1–0 | 0–2 | 2–0 | 1–0 | 1–2 | 1–3 | 1–2 |
| Atlético Minero | 1–2 | 1–0 | | 1–1 | 2–0 | 2–0 | 2–1 | 2–0 | 0–0 | 5–0 | 0–1 | 1–0 | 0–3 | 1–1 |
| Cienciano | 2–1 | 4–1 | 1–1 | | 2–2 | 3–1 | 2–1 | 3–1 | 0–1 | 4–1 | 2–1 | 2–1 | 2–1 | 2–1 |
| Coronel Bolognesi | 0–4 (Note: Played in Estadio Héroes del Alto de la Alianza.) | 3–4 | 3–2 | 2–0 | | 1–1 | 3–1 | 1–2 | 4–4 | 0–0 | 0–1 | 1–2 | 0–2 | 0–1 |
| Melgar | 0–0 | 1–0 | 2–2 | 1–0 | 3–2 | | 2–1 | 2–0 | 2–1 | 3–1 | 1–1 | 2–0 | 1–2 | 1–2 |
| José Gálvez | 0–0 | 4–3 | 0–0 | 1–0 | 3–1 | 4–2 | | 1–1 | 1–1 | 5–0 | 3–2 | 2–2 | 2–2 | 2–0 |
| Juan Aurich | 2–0 | 1–3 | 1–0 | 1–0 | 3–0 | 0–1 | 0–1 | | 4–1 | 2–0 | 2–1 | 1–3 | 0–2 | 1–1 |
| Sport Áncash | 0–0 | 3–1 | 2–2 (Note: Played in Estadio Gerardo Lara Guerrero.) | 1–0 | 1–1 | 2–1 | 2–0 | 2–0 (Note: Played in Estadio Manuel Rivera Sanchez.) | | 2–1 | 0–1 | 1–0 | 0–1 | 3–0 |
| Sport Boys | 0–0 | 1–1 | 2–2 | 0–0 | 1–2 | 0–1 | 1–2 | 1–1 | 0–3 | | 1–2 | 5–2 | 2–5 | 0–0 |
| Sporting Cristal | 1–1 | 1–2 (Note: Played in Estadio Nacional.) | 1–0 | 2–1 | 1–2 | 4–1 | 3–0 | 2–0 | 2–1 | 2–0 | | 1–1 | 1–0 | 0–1 |
| Universidad César Vallejo | 2–1 | 0–2 | 1–2 | 0–1 | 4–1 | 1–1 | 2–3 | 0–0 | 2–1 | 3–0 | 1–0 | | 1–1 | 2–0 |
| Universidad San Martín | 3–1 | 1–0 | 0–0 (Note: Played in Estadio Monumental "U".) | 1–1 | 3–1 | 0–1 | 1–0 | 1–0 | 3–0 | 0–0 | 2–1 | 0–1 | | 1–1 (Note: Played in Estadio Miguel Grau.) |
| Universitario | 0–2 | 1–2 | 1–1 | 1–1 | 1–2 | 2–2 | 1–1 | 4–0 | 2–2 | 2–0 | 1–2 | 2–1 | 2–1 | |

Updated to match(es) played on December 14, 2008. Source: Fixture
Legend: Blue = home team win; Yellow = draw; Red = away team win.

=== Top goalscorers ===
15 goals

- (Brazil) Ronaille Calheira (Sport Áncash)

14 goals

- (Argentina) Claudio Velásquez (José Gálvez)

12 goals

- (Uruguay) Miguel Ximénez (Sporting Cristal)

11 goals

- (Argentina) José Luis Díaz (Universidad San Martín)
- (Argentina) Sergio Ibarra (Melgar)

10 goals

- (Peru) Antonio Meza Cuadra (José Gálvez)

9 goals

- (Peru) Roberto Jiménez (Universitario)

8 goals

- (Peru) Juan Barros (Coronel Bolognesi)
- (Peru) Mauricio Montes (Cienciano)

7 goals

- (Peru) Donny Neyra (Universitario)
- (Peru) Piero Alva (Cienciano)
- (Peru) Wilmer Aguirre (Alianza Lima)
- (Paraguay) Roberto Ovelar (U. San Martín)

== Aggregate table ==
| Pos | Team | Pld | W | D | L | GF | GA | GD | Pts | Qualification or relegation |
|---|---|---|---|---|---|---|---|---|---|---|
| 1 | Universidad San Martín (C) | 52 | 26 | 16 | 10 | 81 | 42 | +39 | 94 | 2009 Copa Libertadores Second Stage (Note: Universitario and U. San Martín qualified to the 2009 Copa Libertadores as Apertura and Clausura champions respectively.) |
| 2 | Sporting Cristal | 52 | 29 | 7 | 16 | 82 | 57 | +25 | 94 | 2009 Copa Libertadores First stage |
| 3 | Universitario | 52 | 24 | 17 | 11 | 71 | 53 | +18 | 89 | 2009 Copa Libertadores Second Stage |
| 4 | Cienciano | 52 | 23 | 11 | 18 | 71 | 57 | +14 | 80 | 2009 Copa Sudamericana First Stage |
| 5 | Alianza Atlético | 52 | 20 | 12 | 20 | 63 | 53 | +10 | 72 | 2009 Copa Sudamericana First Stage |
| 6 | Sport Áncash | 52 | 21 | 9 | 22 | 64 | 65 | −1 | 72 | |
| 7 | Universidad César Vallejo | 52 | 20 | 12 | 20 | 61 | 64 | −3 | 72 | |
| 8 | Melgar | 52 | 18 | 16 | 18 | 53 | 59 | −6 | 70 | |
| 9 | José Gálvez | 52 | 17 | 16 | 19 | 68 | 70 | −2 | 67 | |
| 10 | Coronel Bolognesi | 52 | 17 | 13 | 22 | 67 | 79 | −12 | 64 | |
| 11 | Alianza Lima | 52 | 18 | 9 | 25 | 62 | 71 | −9 | 63 | |
| 12 | Juan Aurich (O) | 52 | 17 | 11 | 24 | 51 | 64 | −13 | 62 | Relegation play-off |
| 13 | Atlético Minero (R) | 52 | 15 | 17 | 20 | 58 | 62 | −4 | 62 | Relegation play-off |
| 14 | Sport Boys (R) | 52 | 8 | 16 | 28 | 40 | 97 | −57 | 38 (Note: Sport Boys were docked 2 points for an outstanding debt with a former manager.) | Relegation to 2009 Segunda División |

Updated to match(es) played on December 14, 2008. Source: Peruvian Football
Rules for classification: 1) points; 2) goal difference; 3) number of goals scored.
(C) Champions; (O) Play-off winners; (R) Relegated

== Relegation play-off ==
December 17, 2008
19:00

| Atlético Minero | 1–2 | Juan Aurich |
|---|---|---|
| Natalio Portillo 26' | Report | Edison Chará 19'; Carlos Zegarra 35' |

Estadio Alejandro Villanueva, Lima
Referee: Héctor Pacheco

Atlético Minero relegated to Segunda División.

== See also ==
- 2008 Peruvian Segunda División
- 2008 Copa Perú
