= Grondona =

Grondona is an Italian surname. Notable people with the surname include:

- Benjamín Grondona Argentine rugby union player
- Gustavo Grondona, Argentine footballer
- Humberto Grondona, Argentine football coach
- Jaime Grondona, Chilean footballer
- Julio Grondona, Argentine football executive
- Mariano Grondona, Argentine journalist
- Stefano Grondona, Italian guitarist
- Santiago Grondona Argentine rugby union player

== See also ==
- Grondona, Piedmont, a comune (municipality) in the Province of Alessandria, Italy
