= Pablo Pacheco =

Peruvian footballer (1908-1982)

Personal information
- Full name: Pablo Pacheco Vidal
- Place of birth: Peru
- Date of death: 2 May 1982
- Position: Forward

Senior career*
Years	Team	Apps	(Gls)
- Universitario de Deportes

International career
- Peru
- * Club domestic league appearances and goals

Pablo Pacheco Vidal (22 June 1908 - 2 May 1982) was a Peruvian football forward who played for Peru in the 1930 FIFA World Cup.

Pacheco played amateur club football with Universitario de Deportes. When the Universitario participated in the Peruvian Primera División for the first time in 1928, Pacheco scored the game-winning goal as the club defeated Alianza Lima to win the first Peruvian Clásico.
