= Hugo Gastulo =

Peruvian footballer (born 1957)

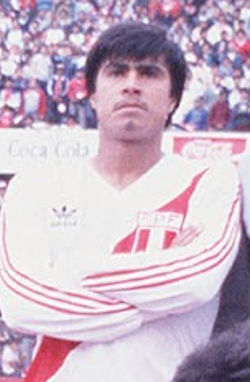

Personal information
- Full name: Alejandro Hugo Gastulo Ramírez
- Date of birth: 28 March 1957 (age 69)
- Place of birth: Lima, Peru
- Position: Defender

Senior career*
Years	Team	Apps	(Gls)
1977–1987	Universitario		
1988	AELU		

International career
1979–1985	Peru	21	(0)
- * Club domestic league appearances and goals as of 24 March 2016

Alejandro Hugo Gastulo Ramírez (born 28 March 1957 in Lima) is a retired Peruvian professional footballer who played as a defender.

== Career ==
Gastulo made 21 appearances for the Peru national football team, including participation at the 1982 FIFA World Cup. At club level, he played for Universitario de Deportes in Peru.

== See also ==
- 1982 FIFA World Cup squads
