= Club Universitario de Deportes =

Peruvian football club

- Full name: Club Universitario de Deportes
- Nicknames: Los Cremas (The Creams); Los Merengues
- Founded: 1924
- Stadium: Estadio Monumental "U"
- Manager: Fabián Bustos
- League: Liga 1
- 2025: Liga 1, 1st of 19
- Website: universitario.pe
Home colours	Away colours	Third colours

Club Universitario de Deportes is a Peruvian professional sports club, in the capital city of Lima. It is primarily known for its football club, which has competed in Liga 1, the top tier of Peruvian football, since 1928. Popularly known as Universitario, they are one the most successful teams in Peruvian football, with 29 titles, and have never been relegated. The club was founded on 7 August 1924 under the name Federación Universitaria by students of the National University of San Marcos, but was forced to rename itself in 1931.

The club won its first Peruvian title in 1929, one year after its debut in the first division. The club won its first double in the 1945 and 1946 seasons and won its first treble after conquering the 2000 season. Since then, Universitario has won twenty-nine first-division titles and was the first Peruvian club, and the Pacific, to reach the final of the Copa Libertadores in 1972. Universitario is one of the two most popular teams in Peru. Universitario's youth team is U América FC which currently participates in the Copa Perú. According to the International Federation of Football History and Statistics, an international organization recognized by FIFA, Universitario was the best Peruvian club of the 20th century and the 28th most successful in South America.

In the year 2000, they opened the 80,093-seat Estadio Monumental, currently the largest stadium in Peru and second-largest in South America, retiring their smaller Estadio Teodoro Lolo Fernández which was converted to a public training ground used by the club and the reserve team.

Universitario and Alianza Lima participate in the Peruvian Clásico, which has its roots in the club's first participation in the Peruvian Primera División in 1928. The rivalry is among the fiercest on the continent and is the oldest and largest rivalry in Peru. It also has rivalries with Sporting Cristal, Deportivo Municipal, and Sport Boys.

Universitario has the most important soccer infrastructure in Peru, with Estadio Monumental, Lolo Fernández and Campo Mar as venues to train and practice not just football but a variety of other sports. Along with a men's football team, Universitario has a basketball, volleyball, futsal (indoor football), and women's football team. It also has a women's and men's football reserves team. Other sports at the club include table tennis and chess.

== History ==
The «U» is regarded as one of the big three of Peruvian football. (Note: Under the name the big three of Peruvian football is how the group formed by the teams (in alphabetical order) Alianza Lima, Sporting Cristal and Universitario de Deportes is known in Peru. This designation would respond to several factors (number of national titles, popularity, number of international appearances, among others).) It plays its home matches at the Estadio Monumental, which has a capacity of 80,093 spectators, making it the second-largest football stadium in South America and one of the largest in the world. To date it is the team that has won the most national championships in Peru, with a total of twenty-nine titles (seven in the amateur era and twenty-two in the professional era). In 1972 it was runner-up in the Copa Libertadores, the best performance of the first team in an international tournament. It also holds a U-20 Copa Libertadores won in 2011.

One of the main characteristics of Universitario de Deportes is its multi-sport nature. In addition to its main section, football, the club has teams in other sports disciplines such as basketball, volleyball, futsal and women's football, among others. It also has a farm club of the first football team, called Club Deportivo U América, which competes in the Copa Perú.

With 49 international appearances in official tournaments organized by CONMEBOL, it is, along with Sporting Cristal, the Peruvian club that has played the most continental cups, It is the second-best Peruvian team in the all-time table of the Copa Libertadores, and is considered by the International Federation of Football History & Statistics to be the best Peruvian team of the 20th century. In addition, a large number of the club's footballers have been selected to represent Peru in various international events, particularly in its greatest achievements, the Copa América editions of 1939 and 1975. (Note: Of the four appearances Peru has made in the FIFA World Cup, at least one club footballer was called up in each. The World Cup with the most cremas footballers was Mexico 1970, where a total of nine Universitario players were called up. At the 1936 Berlin Olympics, four players from the student institution were called up, while at the 1960 Rome Olympics, five of its footballers were part of the squad. As for Copa América editions, Universitario contributed footballers in every edition in which the Peruvian squad participated, with the exception of the 1927 edition (since the club was admitted to the Peruvian Football League in 1928) and the 2004 edition.)

=== Foundation & early years (1924–1927) ===
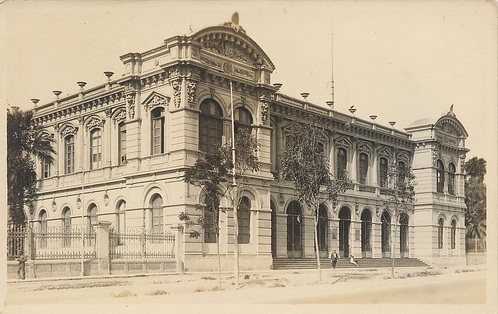
Façade of the San Fernando Faculty of Medicine of the National University of San Marcos, where some of the club's founders and footballers studied.

José Rubio Galindo, a student in the Faculty of Letters and Human Sciences, and Luis Málaga Arenas, a student in the Faculty of Medicine, dedicated their free hours to exchanging ideas with the aim of realizing a shared desire: «to form a great institution». Later they would be joined by Plácido Galindo, Eduardo Astengo, Rafael Quirós, Mario de las Casas, Alberto Denegri, Luis de Souza Ferreira (who scored the first Peruvian goal at a FIFA World Cup), Andrés Rotta, Carlos Galindo, Francisco Sabroso, Jorge Góngora, Pablo Pacheco and Carlos Cillóniz, among others.

The club was founded on 7 August 1924 as Federación Universitaria also known as "Federación Deportivo Universitaria" or "Federación Universitaria de Fútbol" (actual FEDUP) by students and professors of the National University of San Marcos such as José Rubio, the first president, and Luis Málaga, the creator of the club crest. Others present during the foundation were Plácido Galindo, Eduardo Astengo, Mario de las Casas, Alberto Denegri, Luis de Souza Ferreira and Andrés Rotta. At first, Federacion Universitaria was a small league that held tournaments between the faculty departments of the university.

The National Sports Committee, predecessor of the Instituto Peruano del Deporte and the highest sports body in Peru at that time, recognized the University Federation as if it were a League. Thus, together with the Peruvian Football League, the Amateur Association, the Liga Chalaca, Circolo Sportivo Italiano and Lima Cricket and Football Club, they formed the Football Federation. After participating in various inter-university tournaments and friendly matches between 1924 and 1927, the Peruvian Football Federation invited the University Federation to take part in the 1928 Selection and Competition Championship (Primera División Tournament).

It officially debuted on May 27 against Club José Olaya of Chorrillos, which it defeated 7–1. At the end of the championship, the University Federation finished second behind Alianza Lima, against whom it disputed the title in three matches (1–0 win, 1–1 draw and 2–0 loss). In 1929, the championship featured only twelve teams due to the suspension of Alianza Lima for refusing to release its players to the national team. In this tournament, Universitario won its first national title, finishing the championship with seven wins, three draws and one loss, for a total of seventeen points, one more than Circolo Sportivo Italiano, which it had defeated 7–0. Carlos Cillóniz, a Universitario footballer, scored eight goals, becoming the tournament's top scorer.

=== The amateur era (1928–1950) ===
In 1928, the Peruvian Football Federation allowed the club to enter the Peruvian Primera División, the country's premier division. The club surprised opposing and supporting fans that year because they were the runners-up of the season. During that season, on 23 September 1928, Universitario played the first clásico with Alianza Lima, the defending champion of the season, and won 1–0. However, the team lost to Alianza in an end-of-season play-off for the league title after drawing 1–1 in the first leg and losing 2–0 in the second leg. The following year Universitario won its first season title and was crowned Peruvian champion, preventing los Blanquiazules from winning a third consecutive title.

In 1930 the first FIFA World Cup was held in Montevideo, Uruguay, and the Peruvian national team attended the event with a squad in which the presence of eight footballers from the merengue side stood out (Eduardo Astengo, Carlos Cillóniz, Luis de Souza Ferreira, Alberto Denegri, Arturo Fernández, Plácido Galindo, Jorge Góngora and Pablo Pacheco). After the World Cup, the club's first official tour took place: it traveled to the provinces by steamship to face Association White Star, whom it defeated 1–0, then toured Huacho and took part in the Copa Gubbins. That same year, it was part of group 2 in the national tournament, achieving two wins and a draw, thereby advancing to the final round, where it finished third.

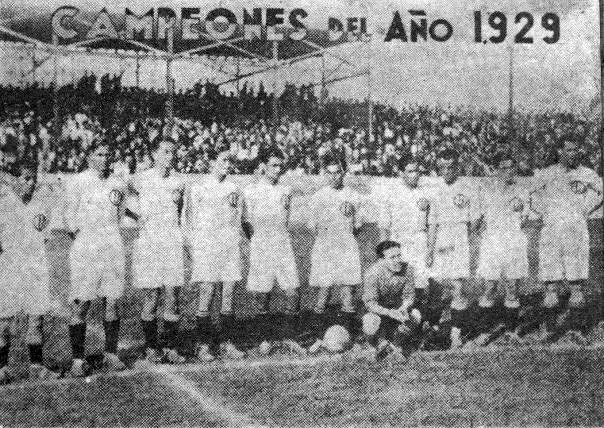
The Universitario squad that won their first Primera División title in 1929: Alva; C. Galindo, Rotta, Denegri, P. Galindo, Astengo, M. Pacheco, P. Pacheco, Góngora, Cillóniz and Souza Ferreira

In 1931, the rector of the university, José Antonio Encinas, forbade the club to use the name Federación Universitaria. As a result, the club changed its name to Club Universitario de Deportes retaining the symbolic "U" in their name. In that same year, 18-year-old Teodoro Fernández, historically known as "Lolo" Fernández, debuted as a regular player of the team in an international friendly against the Deportes Magallanes of Chile.

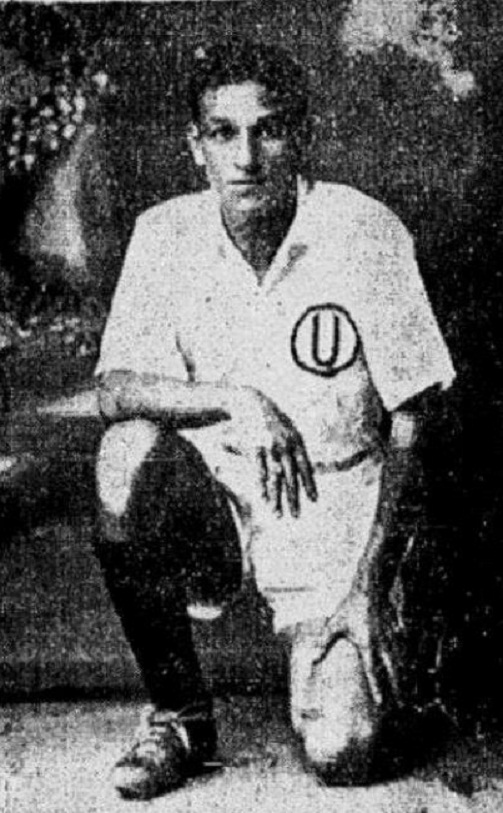
Fernández in his first season with Universitario

Universitario's second title, in 1934, generated controversy because according to the season regulations, the season champion would be determined by the points earned by the senior teams and a fraction of the respective reserve teams. Under these regulations, Alianza Lima would be league champions; however, both senior teams had individually attained six wins, one draw, and one loss and the determining factor was the points obtained in the reserve league. Universitario's officials asked that a play-off between the first division teams be played to determine the season champion. Alianza Lima agreed to the play-off match which was subsequently won by Universitario with a score of 2–1. But according to other sources, this title Universitario won was not the league title itself, but a secondary title; thus creating controversy. Because of that, Alianza Lima considered itself as the champion of this year. However, the Peruvian Football Federation and the Sports Association of Professional Football, both recognize the title of this year belong to Universitario. Furthermore, in 2012, FIFA published an article in which Universitario appears holding the 1934 championship.

The 1935 amateur tournament featured only five teams: Alianza Lima, Sport Boys, Sportivo Tarapacá, Universitario and Mariscal Sucre. It was played between September 15 and October 20. The only team that played all its matches was Sport Boys. The other teams only played two matches and did not continue, since the rosados (Sport Boys), having won all their appearances, were crowned national champions; Universitario finished third with three points. In 1936 the championship was not held due to the Peruvian national team's participation in the 1936 Berlin Olympics.

At those Olympic Games, the crema side contributed four footballers to the national team (Arturo Fernández, Teodoro Fernández, Orestes Jordán and Carlos Tovar), with a great performance from Lolo Fernández, who was the joint second top scorer of the Olympic football tournament with seven goals. After finishing third in the 1937 season, in 1938 the team began a run that lasted five years and five months without suffering a defeat in the Peruvian football derby. A year later the «U», coached by Englishman Jack Greenwell, achieved the third title in its sporting history. It secured nine wins, three draws and only two losses, scoring thirty-two goals, while opponents only managed to beat their goalkeeper on fourteen occasions. In that 1939 championship, the student squad played its official 100th match, a 7–1 win over Atlético Córdoba.

The 1941 season included eight clubs and was played in 2 legs. However, by the twelfth round, the tournament was suspended due to the participation of the national team in the South American Championship. Once the season resumed, Universitario de Deportes reached the title after winning their last two games against Atlético Chalaco and Alianza Lima, 1–0 and 3–1 respectively. Back-to-back titles in 1945 and 1946, led to the club's first bicampeonato thanks to the offensive trio formed by Víctor Espinoza, Teodoro Fernández and his brother Eduardo Fernández; the three players accounted for 41 goals. The following season, in its worst performance in the amateur era, finished in a mediocre eighth place with Sporting Tabaco and only staved off relegation because both teams refused to play a play-off match to determine the relegated team. Hence, the organizing association of the time decided to suspend relegation for the season. In 1949, the club celebrated its twenty-fifth anniversary by winning the championship after winning its last match against Atlético Chalaco 4–3.

On December 19, 1944, during the government of Manuel Prado Ugarteche, Law 10,191 was enacted, granting the club the land on which the Estadio Lolo Fernández would be built; that same year the «U» finished third in the championship with fifteen points. The following year it once again won the national title after ten wins, one draw and three losses. In that competition it scored 270 goals in 56 matches (an average of 4.8 goals per match), a record for effectiveness that stands to this day in Peruvian football. The tournament's top scorer was Lolo, with sixteen goals.

In 1946, for the first time, the championship was played in a three-round format, and the merengue side achieved its first back-to-back title thanks to the attacking trio formed by Víctor Espinoza, Lolo Fernández and Eduardo Fernández (the three footballers scored forty-one goals between them). On April 14, 1946, Eduardo Fernández scored six goals in a derby. The match ended with a 6–2 scoreline in favor of the merengues. (Note: Record for goals scored by a single footballer in a single derby.) In 1947, the U, in its worst performance of the amateur era, finished eighth and preserved its status, since both Universitario and Sporting Tabaco (which had finished seventh) refused to play an extra match to decide who would be relegated to the second division. As a result, the Non-Amateur Association decided to annul the relegation.

In the 1948 amateur tournament, it finished fourth with twenty-eight points on the final table. The club celebrated its silver jubilee and won the 1949 championship, after beating Atlético Chalaco in its final match. The cremas, in the deciding match, won 4–3. Despite having won the title, on June 12 of that same year, the biggest defeat in derby history occurred. The club suffered a 9–1 loss in an unofficial Apertura Tournament organized by the Non-Amateur Association (ANA), (Note: The Apertura Tournaments organized by the Asociación No Amateur (ANA) were played between 1941 and 1969 and only the four teams that finished in the top places of the previous season took part. Unlike the Selection and Competition Tournaments (also organized by the ANA), the Apertura rules allowed substitutions and even re-entries during matches, and additionally the winner of the tournament did not receive any title.) in which only four teams took part. In 1950 the last championship of the amateur era was held, in which Universitario de Deportes finished fifth with nine wins, two draws and seven losses. Alberto Terry was the tournament's top scorer with sixteen goals.

In 1950, the last championship in the amateur era took place, where La U finished fifth after nine wins, two draws and seven defeats. They finished with seven league titles, one less than Alianza Lima, which held the most titles at the end of the amateur era.

=== The professional era (1951–present) ===
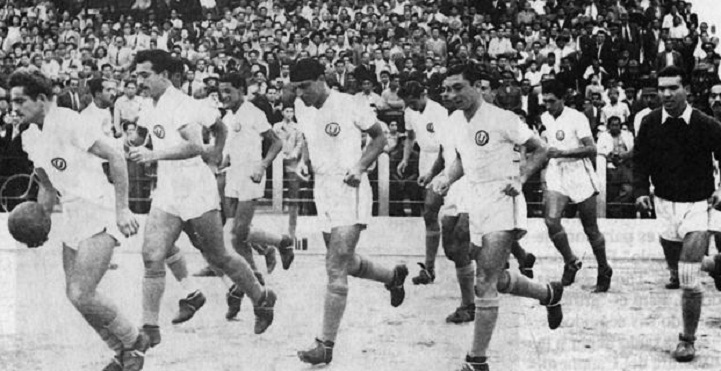
The Universitario squad of the 1950s

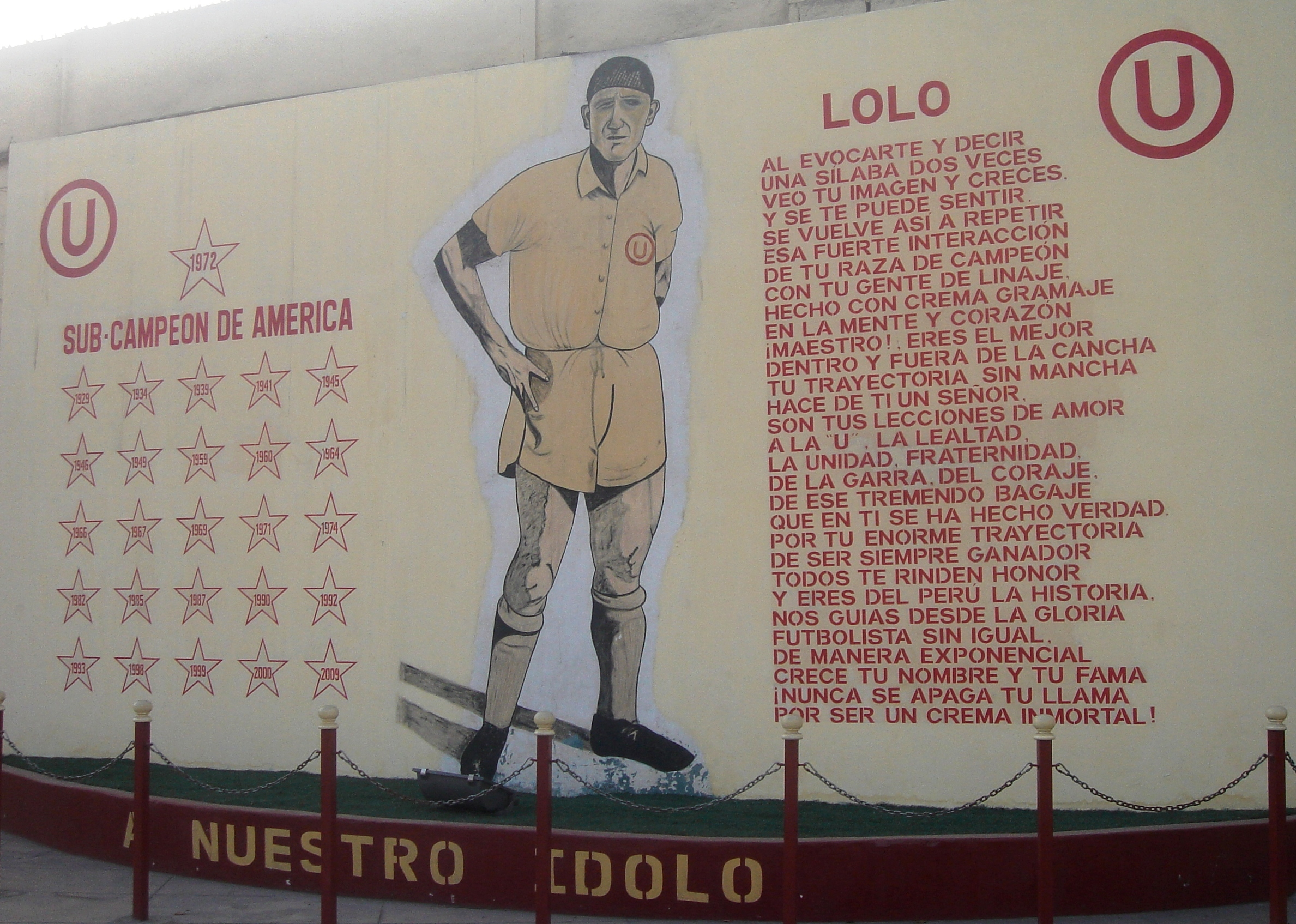
Mural located at the Estadio Lolo Fernández featuring an image of the club's idol.

Professional football came to Peru in 1951, when the Peruvian Football Federation adopted the championship according to the global guidelines for a professional league, but only with the participation of clubs located in the city of Lima and the Province of Callao. The club debuted in the professional era with a win over Mariscal Sucre FBC with a score of 4–1. On 20 July 1952, the inauguration of Teodoro Lolo Fernandez stadium took place, with sporting facilities and a spectator stand that previously belonged to the first national stadium of the country. At the opening, Universitario beat Universidad de Chile by 4–2, with three goals scored by Teodoro Fernández himself. In 1954 Plácido Galindo took the club's presidency, in what was the first of his three administrations at the helm of the institution. Throughout this decade, the club conducted irregular campaigns in the newly professional league, which saw titles shared between Alianza Lima, Sport Boys, Mariscal Sucre, Sporting Cristal, and Centro Iqueño. The title drought of the fifties ended in 1959 when they won their eighth crown, after tying 3–3 with Deportivo Municipal in the final match, totaling fifteen wins, three draws and four losses.

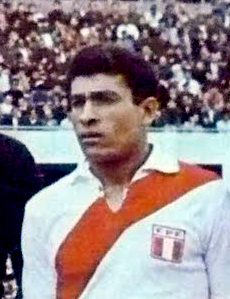
Héctor Chumpitaz, footballer who debuted in 1966, stayed with the club for ten seasons.

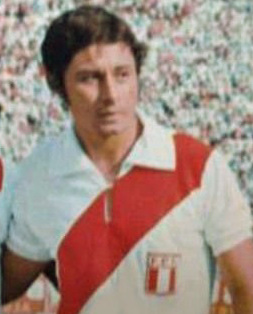
Roberto Chale, who played for the «U» across three spells (1966–1971, 1977 and 1980), winning the championship four times.

In the 1960s, the club's successes were the greatest yet after winning five more championships. The first of them in 1960 after a scoreless draw with Sport Boys, totaling eleven wins, three draws and four defeats in eighteen games; hence achieving its second bicampeonato. As 1960 champion, Universitario was the first Peruvian club to qualify for the first Copa de Campeones de América, the first edition of the Copa Libertadores. On 19 April 1961, the club debuted in South America's premier competition in Montevideo, Uruguay against Peñarol, which ended in a loss of 5–0. After finishing third place in two consecutive seasons, Universitario rose again with the title in 1964, nine points ahead of second place. At the end of 1965, the Peruvian Football Federation expanded the professional league to the entire country by creating the first national tournament as the Torneo Descentralizado, or Decentralized Tournament. In 1966, the first Descentralizado was played. Under the leadership of manager Marcos Calderón, became the first national champion after nineteen wins, three draws and four defeats. In 1967, Universitario successfully defended its crown, winning its third bicampeonato. On 27 February 1968 in the Copa Libertadores, Universitario achieved its biggest win in Copa Libertadores against Always Ready of Bolivia by 6–0. The club finished the decade with a third national title after drawing 1–1 with Atlético Grau in the league final.

==== 1972 Copa Libertadores ====
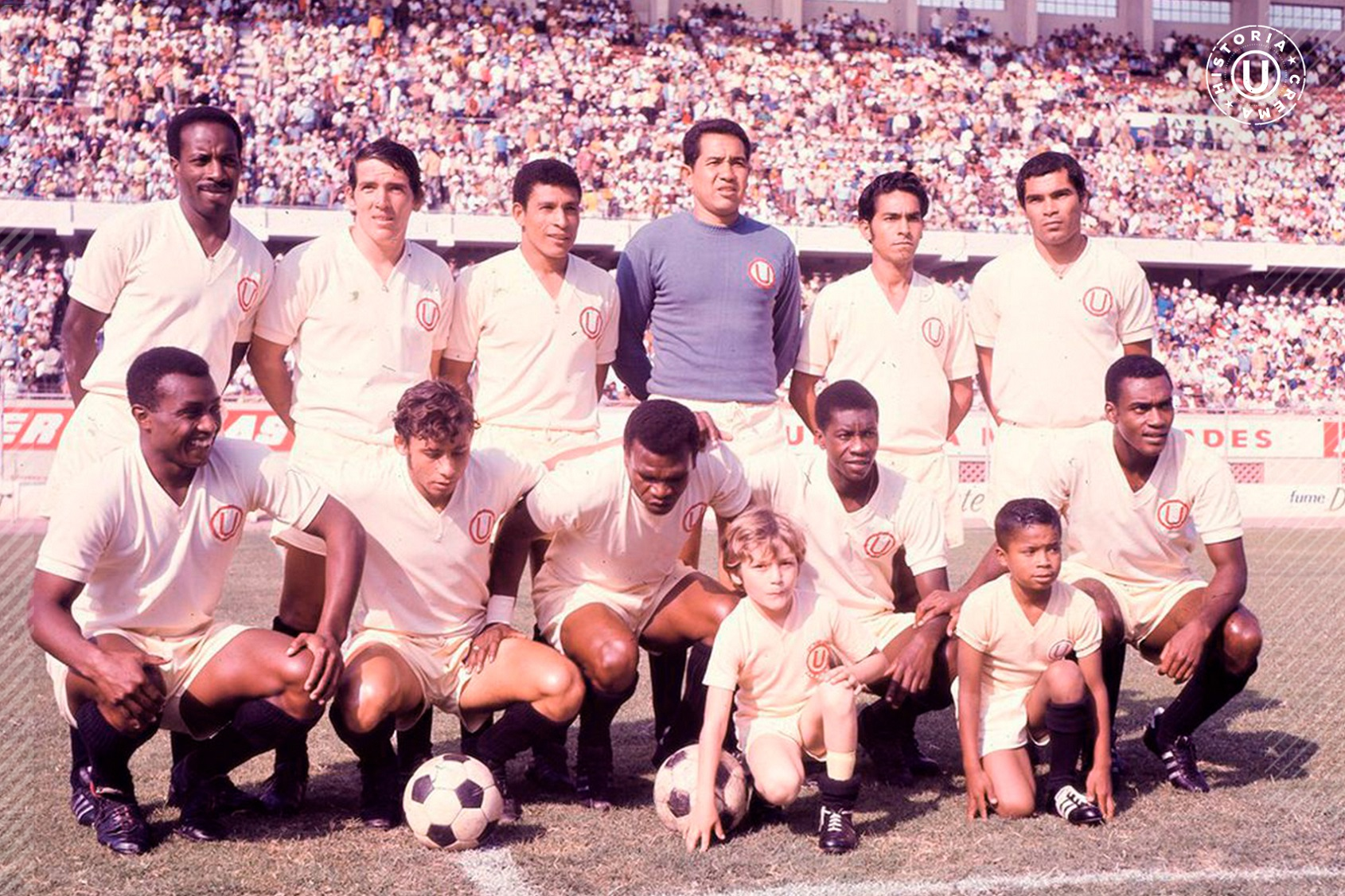
1970 Squad of Universitario de Deportes. Standing: Eloy Campos, Ramón Mifflin, Héctor Chumpitaz, Luis Rubiños, Nicolás Fuentes, Orlando de la Torre. Crouching: Julio Baylón, Roberto Challe, Pedro Pablo León, Eladio Reyes and Alberto Gallardo.

On September 19, 1970, the «U» beat Atlético Torino 9–0, the biggest win the club has achieved in the national championship. In 1971, under the guidance of Uruguayan head coach Roberto Scarone, the team won its fourteenth championship with two matchdays to spare, following a 5–2 rout of Deportivo Olímpico, achieving eighteen wins, ten draws and only two losses, for a total of forty-six points (with a six-point advantage over the second-place team). That same year, on October 1, the institution acquired the land on which the Campo Mar - U Sports Complex would be built.

In 1971, Universitario won its fourteenth First División title and qualified for the 1972 edition of the Copa Libertadores under the Uruguayan head coach Roberto Scarone along with Alianza Lima who placed second that season. They were grouped with the Chilean teams Unión San Felipe and Universidad de Chile in Group 4. Universitario's first game was the Peruvian Superclásico which it won 2–1. The following game was held in Santiago de Chile against Universidad de Chile where it lost 1–0. Universitario later tied with the other Chilean team in Santiago. Universitario returned to Lima to face Alianza Lima again where they tied 2–2. At that point, Universitario and Universidad de Chile had accumulated 4 points while Alianza Lima and Unión San Felipe had 3. Universitario won the remaining games against the Chilean teams in Lima, obtaining 8 points and qualifying for the next round.

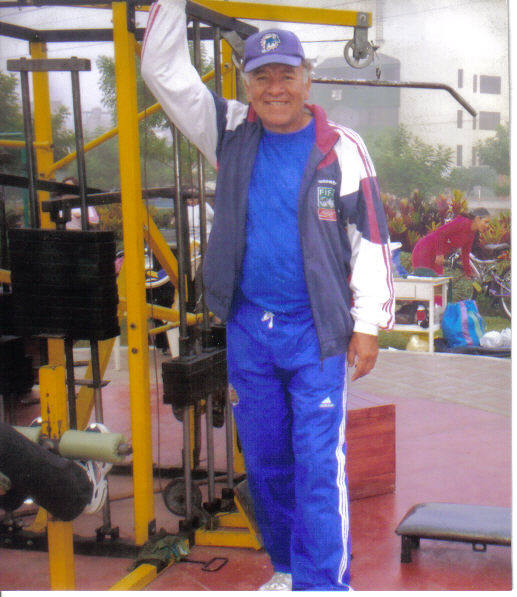
Fernando Cuéllar, national champion three times with the «U» (1969, 1971 and 1974).

Universitario was grouped with the Uruguayan clubs Peñarol—a three-time winner of the Copa Libertadores—and Nacional—the previous edition's winner—in the semi-final group stage. La U started off losing their first match against Peñarol in Lima. In that match, La U did not play with five of their starting players because they were called to play for the Peru national football team. However, they won the following game against Nacional 3–0. They then visited both teams in Montevideo tying both games, 3–3 against Nacional and 1–1 against Peñarol. Universitario had accumulated 4 points and there was only one game left between Peñarol and Nacional, which had 4 and 2 points respectively. All three teams had a chance of qualifying for the next round. Peñarol only needed a win but Nacional needed a win by 5 goals. The game ended 3–0 in favor of Nacional, allowing Universitario to qualify for the final round where they would face Independiente.

The first leg of the final was played in Lima where they tied 0–0. The game in Argentina ended 2–1 in favor of the Argentines; Percy Rojas scored the late goal for Universitario. This was Percy Rojas' sixth goal in the tournament. He, along with Oswaldo Ramírez, Teófilo Cubillas, and Toninho, were the top-scorers. Although Universitario lost, they had achieved something a Peruvian club had never before, reach the final of the Copa Libertadores, the most prestigious international competition in South America.

Two years later, in 1974, the club celebrated its 50th anniversary, created a football school for minors and finished the year as champion under the leadership of Argentine Juan Eduardo Hohberg.

==== Regional tournaments (1980–1991) ====
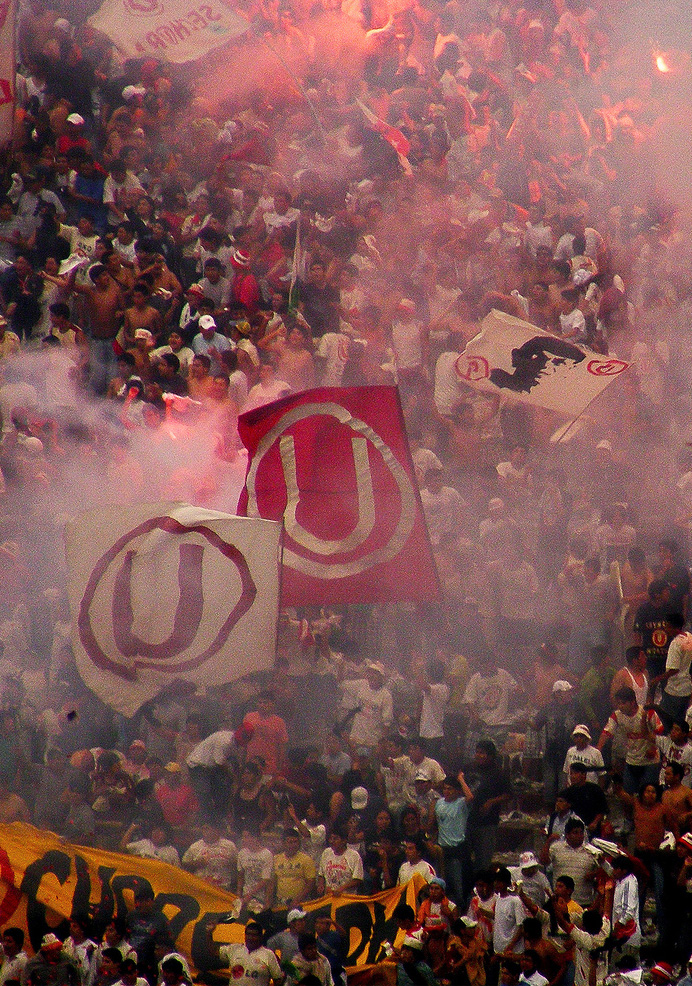
The Trinchera Norte, the club's barra brava founded on November 9, 1988.

In the 1980s, after eight years, the club won the national title after winning all three of its matches in the final round, obtaining six points. The decisive win came against Deportivo Municipal, beaten 1–0 thanks to a goal from Hugo Gastulo, with a great performance from footballers Germán Leguía and Percy Rojas, who returned to Peru following his time at Belgium's R.F.C. Seraing.

The 1982 season saw the tournament played in group stages. Universitario advanced from its Metropolitan Group to Group B of the second stage and finally to the four-team group final, known as the Liguilla. Universitario successfully defeated all of its opponents in the Liguilla and reached its sixteenth first-division title. The decisive victory was against Deportivo Municipal after a lone goal by Hugo Gastulo.

On February 26, 1983, Universitario's beach venue was inaugurated: the Campo Mar - U Sports Complex, which covers an area of 520,000 m² and is located on the Pan-American South Highway, kilometer 30.5, in the Lurín District (Lima), a kilometer and a half from Pachacámac Island (known as Whale Island for its silhouette resembling a giant whale). Today, this complex houses the U's Sports Village (VIDU), which serves as a training venue for the various youth divisions and also for the professional team, particularly during pre-season periods.

In 1985, José Luis Carranza, became an important icon of the club, and debuted on the first team. Universitario won the Torneo Regional, or Regional Tournament, of the early season successfully remained at the top of the league by advancing to the Liguilla by placing second in the Torneo Descentrlizado and conquering the Liguilla by winning all five matches played, the last of which was a 4–0 win over Los Espartanos de Pacasmayo with goals by Miguel Seminario, Fidel Suárez, Eduardo Rey Muñoz and Jaime Drago. As Universitario won both tournaments of the season, they were automatically declared 1985 champions. Universitario de Deportes returned to the top of Peruvian football in 1987. In 1985, Universitario began the season by winning the Regional Tournament, which put them in the season final to face off with the winner of the Descentralizado for the national title. The Descentralizado went to their classic rival, Alianza Lima which meant the season final would be contested as another edition of the Clásico. Also, both Universitario and Alianza Lima reached the final with seventeen first-division titles under their belts. The defining derby was won by Universitario with a single goal by Fidel Suárez, overcoming the tie they had in the most Peruvian titles. In 1990, with the arrival of Fernando Cuellar as coach, Universitario de Deportes won the First Regional Tournament of the season, automatically advancing to the season final where they faced Sport Boys, winner of the Second Regional Tournament.

Universitario de Deportes returned to the top of Peruvian football in 1987. As a first step toward this new triumph it won the Regional Tournament title, thereby waiting for the winner of the final round to dispute the national title. Then came the Descentralizado, which went to Alianza Lima. The deciding derby went in favor of the merengues 1–0, with a goal from Fidel Suárez.

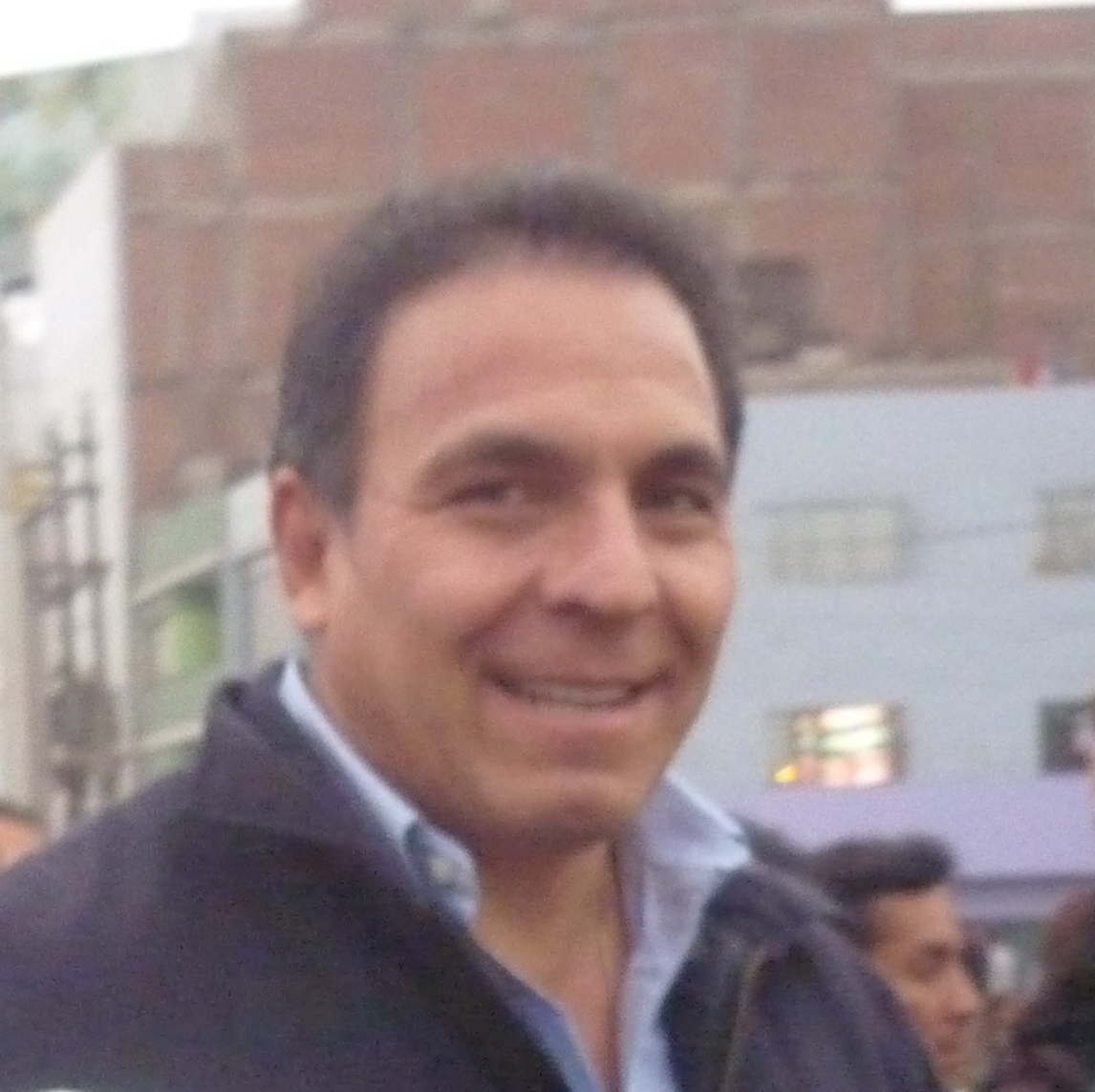
Freddy Ternero, club coach in 1994.

In 1990, with the arrival of Fernando Cuéllar on the crema bench, Universitario de Deportes won the 1990-I Regional Tournament, automatically qualifying for the national final, where it faced Callao's Sport Boys, winner of the decentralized tournament. The final was played on February 3, 1991, with victory for the merengue side, who won 4–2, with goals from Roberto Martínez (2), Héctor Cedrés and Oswaldo Araujo, while Pedro Requena (own goal) and Carlos Henrique Paris scored for Sport Boys. In May 1991 Universitario was invited to the city of Guayaquil to play a friendly against Emelec to mark the reopening of the Estadio George Capwell after it was renovated and its capacity expanded.

==== The mid-nineties (1992–1997) ====
In the year 1992, the national championship regulations were generally amended again by dropping the regional tournaments and returning to a similar system before the 1980s where the clubs would first play in a league and subsequently advance to the Liguilla. The club won the title a week before the final round, after defeating CD San Agustín 4–1, with goals two goals from Ronald Baroni and the remaining coming from César Charún and José Luis Carranza. With Sergio Markarián in charge of the first team, la U defended its title in 1993, achieving a new bicampeonato for the club. The defining match that gave Universitario its twenty-first title was a 3–0 over San Agustín; two goals were scored by Jorge Amado Nunes and one by Roberto Martinez. This was the fourth time in the club's history that it won back-to-back titles.

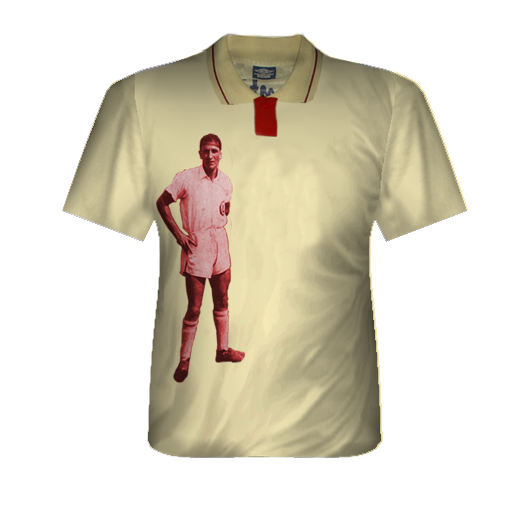
Jersey commemorating Teodoro Fernández Meyzán worn by Universitario's players during the 1997 Copa Conmebol.

In the 1996 decentralized tournament, the team finished third with sixteen wins, ten draws and four losses, which secured it a spot in the Pre-Libertadores Playoff. In the first match it won 3–2 against Deportivo Pesquero, then drew 0–0 with Alianza Lima, and in the third match thrashed Cienciano 5–0, finishing second and qualifying for the 1997 Copa Conmebol. On July 2, 1997, for the first time a derby was played outside Peru; Universitario beat Alianza Lima 2–1 in a friendly played in Miami (United States); the crema goals were scored by Guido Alvarenga and Roberto Farfán. That same year it took part in the Copa Conmebol for the second time, facing Ecuador's Universitario in the round of 16, whom it beat 3–0 in the first leg and drew 0–0 in the second leg.

In the next round, it faced Colombia's Deportes Tolima, losing 1–0 and winning 2–0, thereby advancing to the semifinal, where it was eliminated by Brazil's Atlético Mineiro, on a 6–0 aggregate score. In 1998 Argentine coach Osvaldo Piazza arrived at the institution, and with him it won the Apertura Tournament title, which earned it the right to dispute the qualifiers for the national final, beating Sporting Cristal, champion of the Clausura Tournament, 2–1 in the second final match with two goals from Roberto Farfán. Since the first match had finished 2–1 in favor of Sporting Cristal, the winner had to be decided by a penalty shoot-out, in which they beat the celestes 4–2.

==== The treble (1998–2000) ====
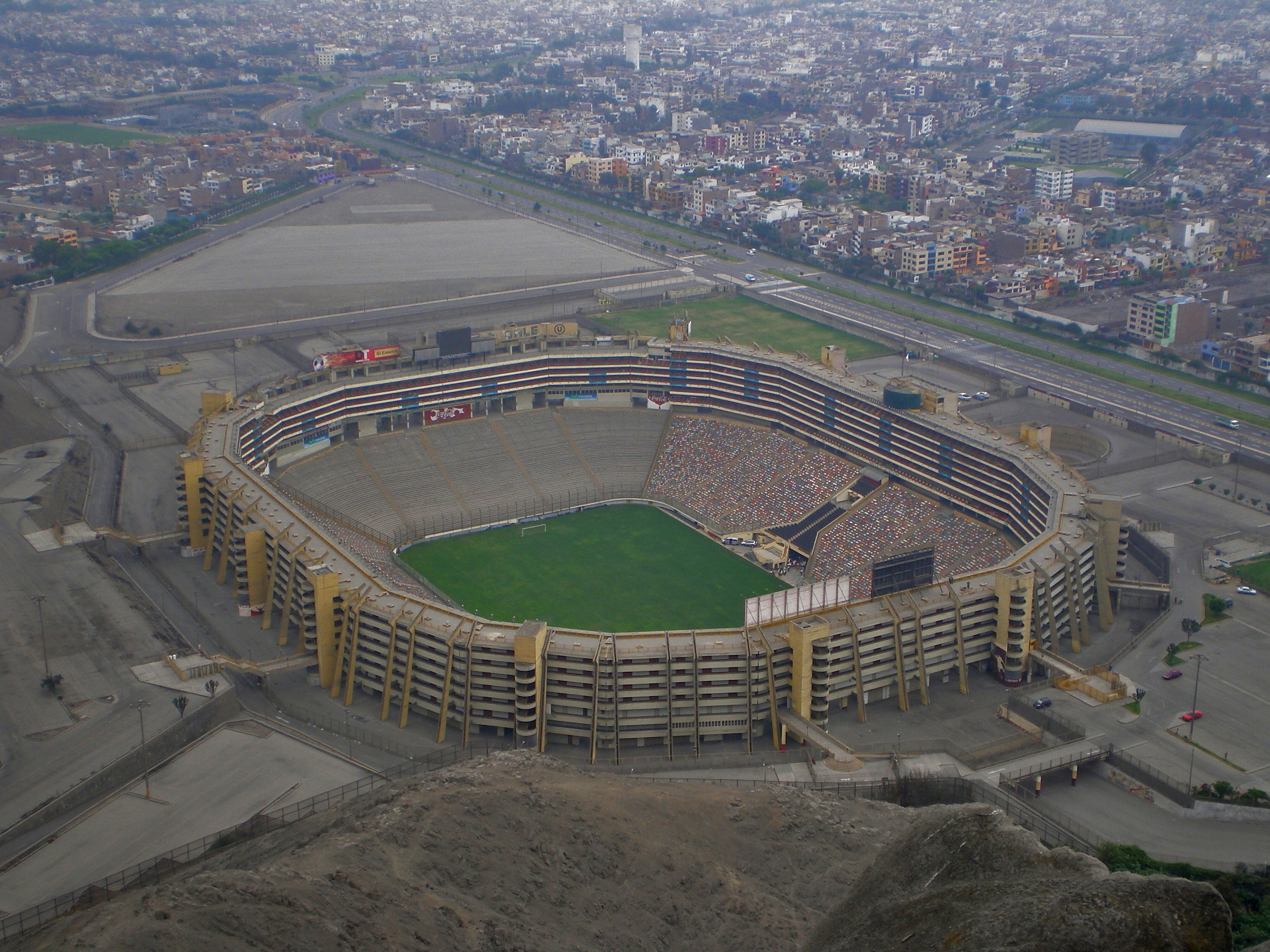
Aerial view of the Estadio Monumental, inaugurated in 2000.

By winning in 1998, 1999, and 2000, Universitario won their first treble or Tricampeonato. The 1998 title was won under Oswaldo Piazza, Gustavo Falaschi, Miguel Company and Roberto Challe led the club to the other two titles. It was the third Peruvian team to do this; the first being in the amateur era won by Alianza Lima and the second in the early nineties by Sporting Cristal. It was also during the 2000 season that they were the second Peruvian club to win an Apertura and Clausura in a single season; the first being Alianza Lima in 1997. In the Copa Libertadores, Universitario made it to the Round of 16 in 1998 but lost to Vélez Sársfield. In 1999 and 2000 they failed to advance past the group stage. Universitario also participated in all four editions of the Copa Merconorte between 1999 and 2001 but did not have a lot of success, being eliminated in the group stage all four times.

On January 30, 2000, the Copa El Gráfico-Perú was played between Universitario de Deportes and Universidad de Chile, ending 1–0 in favor of the Peruvians. The goal was scored by José Guillermo del Solar. On July 2 the Estadio Monumental was inaugurated with a capacity of 80,093 spectators (considered one of the most modern stadiums in Latin America) with a 2–0 win by Universitario over Sporting Cristal, in a match valid for that year's Peruvian professional championship.

This stadium replaced the old Estadio Lolo Fernández as the main venue for the «U»'s matches in the national championship; the cremas were crowned Peruvian football champions for the third consecutive time, totaling 100 points between the Apertura Tournament and the Clausura Tournament. The club became champion against Chiclayo's Juan Aurich, thrashing them 5–0. It was the first championship it won as the home side at Lima's Estadio Monumental. The goals were scored by Piero Alva (2), Eduardo Esidio (2) and Gustavo Grondona.

Brazilian Esidio established himself as the Peruvian Primera División's top scorer of a season with 37 goals, and joint second-highest scorer worldwide in 2000. In 2002, the club faced a severe financial crisis that caused delays in paying the salaries of the team, coaching staff and administrative personnel. A Members' Assembly was held; however, despite the fact that many already wanted the club president to step down due to the institution's economic crisis, he remained firmly in his position. The situation was difficult both on and off the pitch, to the point that the professional footballers decided to go on strike and the leadership decided to turn to the youth team.

Despite everything, the team, which was going through a very difficult economic situation, managed to be crowned champion of the Apertura Tournament; the crema squad became champions without paying its footballers, who literally played for the jersey. In June, Universitario was chosen as the world's club of the month by the International Federation of Football History & Statistics. The financial and sporting crisis facing the institution prompted a motion from a group of crema members who collected signatures to bring forward elections in order to secure the appointment of a new president to replace Javier Aspauza.

==== 2001–2009 ====
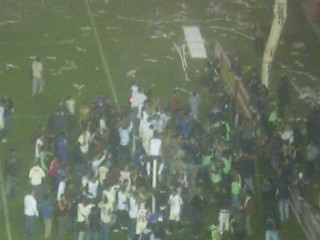
Universitario celebrates its 2008 Apertura title after beating Cienciano 3–1.

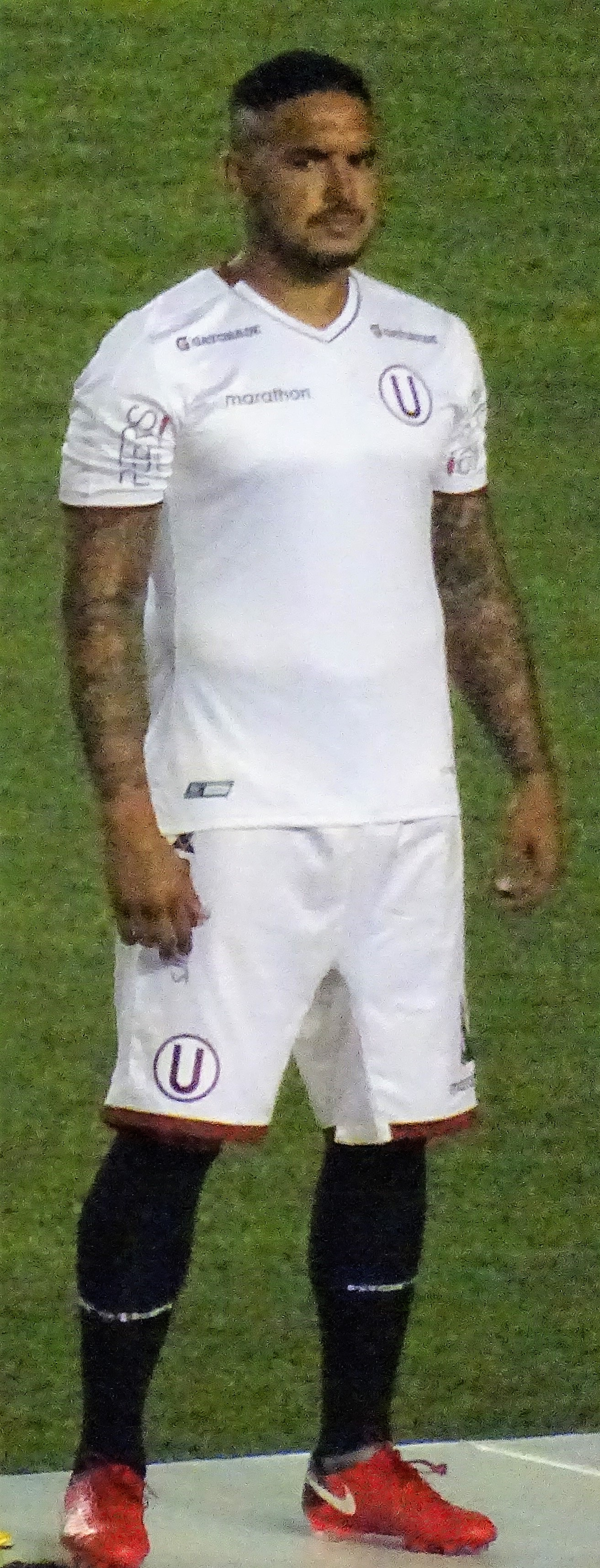
Juan Manuel Vargas, member of the squad that won the 2002 Apertura Tournament.

Thanks to winning the 2002 Apertura Tournament title, Universitario de Deportes qualified for the 2003 Copa Libertadores, where it was eliminated in the first round with one win, four draws and one lHowever, a few days later, Aspauza responded by announcing that he had secured a new sponsor for the club. Ron Pomalca was officially presented to sponsor the 2002 and 2003 seasons. The money received covered approximately a third of the club's debts to its professional squad. On September 4, it debuted in the Copa Sudamericana with a 1–0 loss to Alianza Lima. In that year's Clausura Tournament, the «U» finished second-to-last, which did not allow it to dispute the national title decider.oss. In that same year's Decentralized Championship, it finished ninth in the accumulated table, leaving it with no chance of playing in an international tournament the following year. On May 30, 2004, the team played a friendly against a Pisco selection, winning 2–0, and in the 2004 Decentralized Championship it finished fifth.

That same year, José Luis Carranza's retirement occurred, due to an injury that would not heal given his advanced age and the problems it was generating within the squad, so he ended up being let go. A few days later, in an interview, the Puma Carranza cried on television cameras, stating that he had to resign because he was forced to lie about a supposed injury. Finally, on October 11, 2004, Carranza rejoined Universitario de Deportes' training sessions, and on October 16, 2004, he reappeared in local football, coming onto the pitch in place of Paolo Maldonado in the final minutes of the match against Trujillo's Universidad César Vallejo.

His last match as a professional was played on December 26, 2004, against Deportivo Wanka at the Estadio Monumental, a 5–2 win for the merengues, scoring from a penalty (with a pase del desprecio), (Note: The pase del desprecio consists of making a pass while looking in a direction other than the ball's final destination.). one of the few goals he scored in his career. In 2005, the club took part in the Copa Sudamericana for the second time, though it was again eliminated in the first round, this time by Alianza Atlético de Sullana on a 4–1 aggregate score. From February 3 to 10, 2005, the Copa de Verano was played, with the cremas emerging as tournament champions with two wins and a draw. With the arrival of Argentine coach Juan Amador Sánchez, Universitario took part in the 2006 Copa Libertadores, finishing last in its group with only two points, after two draws and four losses.

That same season, Sporting Cristal organized a friendly tournament to mark its 50th anniversary; in the first match the «U» faced Paraguay's Cerro Porteño, a match that ended in a 1–0 win for the merengues thanks to a goal from Arnaldo Alonso, in the second match it thrashed Sporting Cristal 4–0 with goals from José Mendoza, Manuel Barreto, Donny Neyra and Alex Magallanes. Under the technical direction of Jorge Amado Nunes, the team finished fifth in the overall table of the 2006 Torneo Descentralizado, meeting the necessary conditions to play in the 2007 Copa Sudamericana. A few matchdays into the 2007 Apertura Tournament, Nunes was dismissed by the club's then-leadership due to poor results and the opposition his presence generated among the squad's key figures, with Colombian Édgar Ospina taking over as coach.

However, following the elections at the entity, the new board led by Gino Pinasco in turn decided to dismiss the Colombian and reinstate Jorge Amado Nunes as team manager, a decision that also involved the termination of contracts of footballers such as Piero Alva, Luis Guadalupe and Gregorio Bernales, among others. On July 18, three days before the start of the 2007 Clausura Tournament, Jorge Amado Nunes was removed from the position once again due to problems with certain officials. Julio Gómez took over as coach, but poor results and elimination from the Copa Sudamericana in the first round led the club to replace him with Argentine Ricardo Gareca, finishing the championship in fourth place and qualifying for the 2008 Copa Sudamericana.

Universitario saw little success after its Tricampeonato. In 2002, Universitario beat Alianza Lima in the Apertura two-legged play-off but were unable to finish in the top four of the 2002 Clausura and were ineligible to dispute the national title. In 2005, Universitario placed first on the aggregate table and qualified for the 2006 Copa Libertadores, where they won on away goals against Nacional in the first phase of the tournament, however, they were eliminated in the group stage. Universitario continually failed to win a twenty-fifth national title but qualified for the Copa Sudamericana in 2007 and 2008. In both editions, they were eliminated in the first stage.

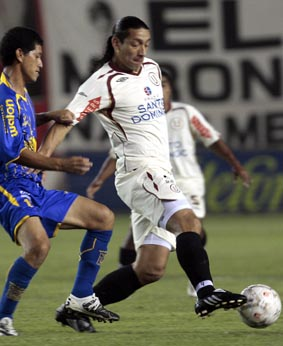
Carlos Galván, one of Universitario's key figures who contributed to winning the Apertura Tournament.

In 2008, Universitario was recognized as the best team in Peru for the 2007 season, and it began with the signings of footballers such as Gianfranco Labarthe, Rainer Torres, Óscar Ibáñez, Roberto Jiménez, Julio Landauri, Jorge Araujo and Gregorio Bernales. On January 23, the club received an invitation to the meeting of FIFA's Working Group for Clubs, held at the Home of FIFA headquarters, where various topics were discussed, including matters relating to the release of players to national teams and greater participation by clubs in FIFA decision-making.

On February 9, the official presentation of the «U»'s squad was held, at the traditional Noche Crema, with a friendly against Uruguay's Defensor Sporting that ended in a 2–2 draw. The squad began the Apertura Tournament with a 1–1 draw against Universidad de San Martín de Porres at the Estadio Monumental. The team then traveled to the north of the country, where it played two matches, the first against Chimbote's José Gálvez, winning 1–0, and the second against Chiclayo's Juan Aurich, drawing 1–1.

On March 5, on the fifth matchday of the Apertura Tournament, it suffered its first defeat of the championship at the hands of Cienciano, 4–1, but a few days later it bounced back with a win in the modern derby against Sporting Cristal, 1–0. On April 30, the Peruvian superclásico was played at the National Stadium, ending 2–1 in favor of the cremas, the goals scored by Donny Neyra and Roberto Jiménez. As the championship's matchdays went by, the «U» consolidated its position at the top of the table.

On Wednesday, July 2, with three matchdays remaining, it was crowned Apertura Tournament champion, in a match against Cienciano that had been postponed due to the holding of the 5th Summit of Heads of State and Government of Latin America, the Caribbean and the European Union in the city of Lima. After 28 minutes of the first half, Colombian Héctor Hurtado scored the first goal with an angled shot, and in the 44th minute Araujo made it 2–0 with a header. The second half began with Cienciano dominating the match, and, in the 62nd minute, thanks to a goal from Gustavo Vassallo, they pulled one back. However, in the 71st minute, only a few minutes after coming on, Mayer Candelo scored the final 3–1 with a penalty kick.

Thus the team took its lap of honor at the Estadio Monumental after six years, in front of 60,000 spectators. The second half of the year was very irregular due to injuries and poor performances from some key squad members, as well as various off-field problems faced by Argentine coach Ricardo Gareca. Universitario only achieved eight wins in twenty-six matches, finishing tenth in the Clausura Tournament and losing the opportunity to dispute the national final against Universidad de San Martín de Porres.

After Ricardo Gareca's resignation as coach, club officials began searching for a new coach. Among the candidates were Carlos Compagnucci, José Guillermo del Solar, Juan Reynoso and Sergio Markarián. There was a report that "Chemo" del Solar would be the new coach and that José Luis Carranza would be part of his coaching staff; however, given the impossibility of Del Solar leaving the Peruvian national team and the high financial demands of Compagnucci and Markarián, the board opted to hire Juan Reynoso, a former club player in the 1990s with a long career in Mexican football.

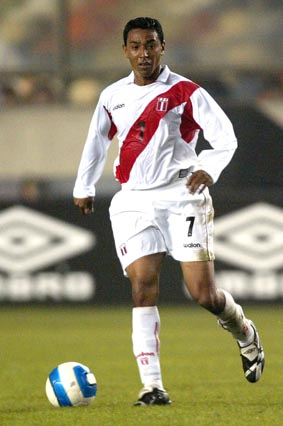
Nolberto Solano, the star signing of 2009.

Almost the same core squad from the previous season was kept, though with the departure of some important footballers such as Héctor Hurtado, Mayer Candelo, Luis Ramírez and Donny Neyra. Likewise, former Universitario players such as Carlos Orejuela, John Galliquio, Piero Alva and Francisco Bazán arrived, as did Mexican Rodolfo Espinoza, Brazilian Ronaille Calheira, and Peruvian Nolberto Solano, regarded by both national and international media as Peruvian football's star signing.

The Noche Crema was scheduled for January 28, with a friendly against Colombia's Independiente Santa Fe. However, due to a fault in the Estadio Monumental's electrical system, only the first 18 minutes of the match were played. In the Decentralized Championship, Universitario debuted on February 15 with a 2–1 win over Alianza Atlético de Sullana, thanks to a brace from Solano. In the 2009 Copa Libertadores the team was part of group 8 together with Paraguay's Libertad, Mexico's San Luis and Argentina's San Lorenzo.

Its cup debut occurred on February 11 against Club Libertad in a match that ended 2–1 in favor of the Paraguayans. In the next match it beat San Lorenzo 1–0 and then obtained two draws against San Luis, 0–0 and 2–2. The team arrived at the last matchday in second place in its group, three points ahead of third-place San Luis. However, Universitario was defeated 2–0 away against San Lorenzo, and the Mexican team obtained a win by the same score, so the cremas were eliminated from the tournament on goal difference.

In the national championship the team finished the first stage of the tournament in second place in the overall table with 54 points, later finishing first in the "liguilla B" in which it took part. With this result the «U» earned the right to dispute the championship final in two play off matches against the winner of "liguilla A", which turned out to be its rival Alianza Lima. In the play-offs, the student squad won, first away (0–1), and finally at home (1–0), thus reuniting with a national title, the twenty-fifth of its history, which had eluded it for nine years. The balance of the 2009 tournament could not have been better, as the cremas obtained the highest accumulated score, won all four derbies of the year, and secured their participation in the 2010 Copa Libertadores.

Minor success came in 2008 when Ricardo Gareca led Universitario to an Apertura tournament. The last time they won an Apertura title was in 2002. They won the tournament on their twenty-second game 10 points ahead of Sporting Cristal and four games away from the end of the Apertura. They defeated Cienciano 3–1 to secure first place and accumulated 50 points to win the title. They qualified for the 2009 Copa Libertadores but did not finish in the top seven of the Clausura and consequently could not contest the season final for the national title against Universidad San Martín. In 2009, following the resignation of Ricardo Gareca the club hired Juan Reynoso as the new manager, a former player of the club in the 90s and with a long history in Mexican football. Much of the 2008 squad remained for the 2009 season, but with the departure of some notable players like Héctor Hurtado, Mayer Candelo and Donny Neyra. The most important signing before the 2009 season was Nolberto Solano. Other players to arrive were Carlos Orejuela, John Galliquio, Piero Alva, Francisco Bazán, Rodolfo Espinoza, and Ronaille Calheira.

In the season final, which would be a repeat of the 1987 final, Universitario would face arch-rival Alianza Lima. Universitario won both legs under intelligent management from Reynoso. In the first leg they won 1–0 with a goal from Piero Alva and in the second leg Nolberto Solano scored the defining goal from the penalty mark in the tenth minute of play.

As of 2009, Universitario has twenty-five Primera División titles. The first seven titles won by Universitario were during the amateur era. The remaining eighteen titles were won during the professional era, the most any Peruvian club has. The balance of the 2009 tournament could not be better with the Universitario ending the year with the highest cumulative score and claiming victory in the four super clásicos of the year, ensuring their participation in the Copa Libertadores 2010.

==== 2010 – present ====
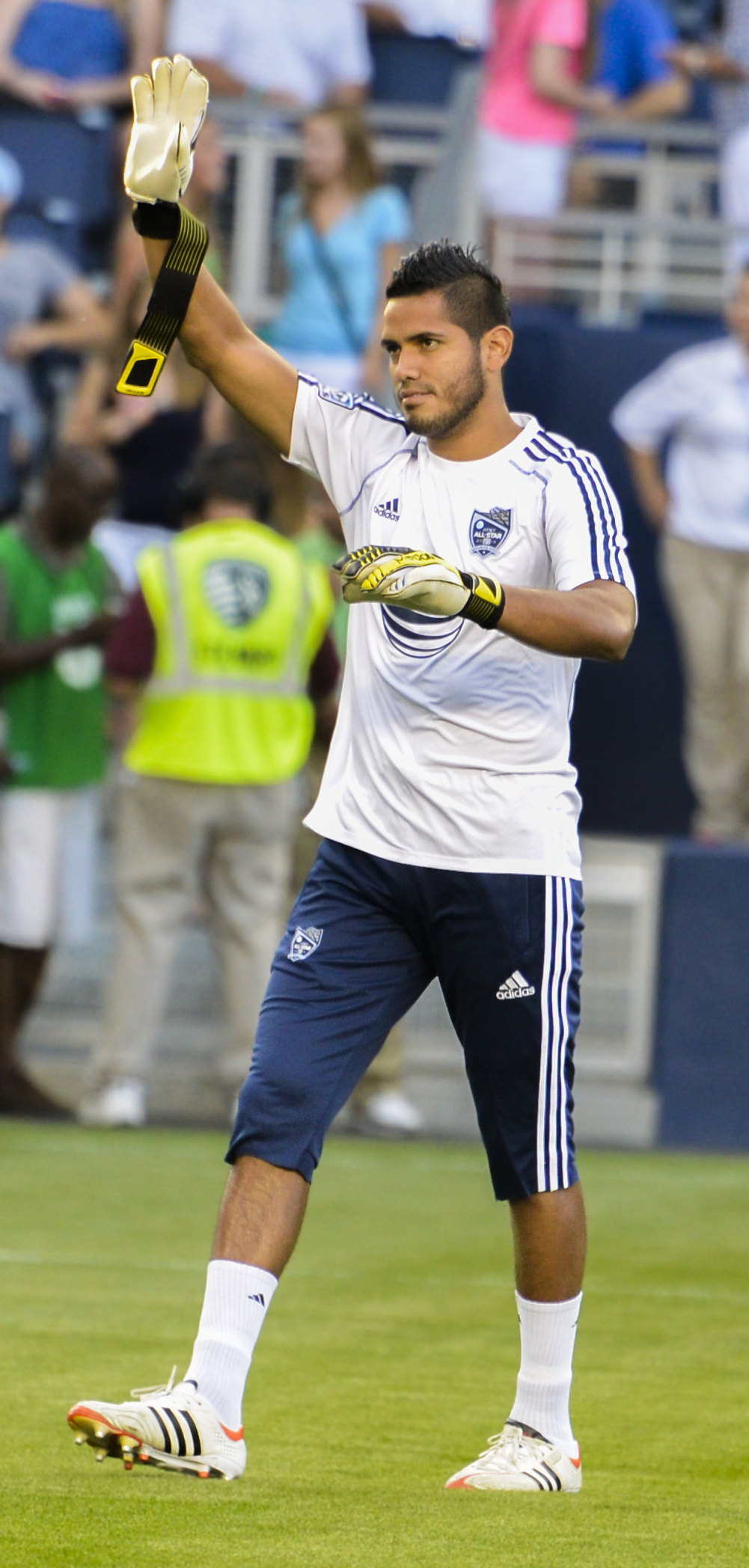
Raúl Fernández, goalkeeper trained in the club's youth divisions, who was signed by OGC Nice in 2011.

In the continental tournament "la U" was part of Group 4 of the Copa Libertadores 2010 with Blooming, Lanús from Argentina and Libertad. In the first game scored an away victory to Blooming 2–1. A week later defeated by a score of 2–0 to Lanús and then tied 0–0 with Libertad, this meeting was the number 200 in the history of the club in the Copa Libertadores. Universitario closed its participation in the group stage with three more draws, for a total of ten points, being, along with the Brazilian sides Internacional and São Paulo, one of the best defenses of the tournament, having conceded only two goals.

Universitario ended his participation in the group stage with three more draws for a total of 10 points, and alongside Brazilian teams Internacional and São Paulo became the best defenders in the tournament to receive only two goals against. Coincidentally, the São Paulo was the merengue's rival in the knockout stage, both matches ended 0–0 so the winner was decided by penalty kicks resulting in the Brazilian club winning 3–1. La U left the Cup undefeated, having achieved 2 wins and 6 draws,

Coincidentally, São Paulo was the merengue side's opponent in the round of 16; both matches ended 0–0, so the winner was decided by a penalty shoot-out, resulting in a 3–1 win for the São Paulo club. The «U» bowed out of the cup unbeaten, having achieved two wins and six draws, an achievement reached for only the second time in history by a Peruvian club. Meanwhile, in the domestic league the club had its worst start to a season in its history, losing its first three matches of the championship.

The cremas recovered quickly with three consecutive wins and did not suffer another defeat until the twelfth matchday, when they lost 1–0 away to León de Huánuco. Once again a series of managerial problems and constant coaching changes prevented the team from having a good campaign. During the first part of the tournament the Peruvian Football Federation's Conciliation and Dispute Resolution Chamber deducted two points from it for having an outstanding debt with Ricardo Gareca, and it finished in fifth place with 51 points, from sixteen wins, five draws and nine losses.

In the second stage of the championship the «U» was part of the "liguilla impar" in which it achieved five wins and six draws for a total of 72 points, obtaining qualification for the 2011 Copa Sudamericana. As has been customary in recent years, the season began with the Copa Crema 2011. It featured the participation of América de Cali, Arsenal de Sarandí, Sporting Cristal and the local side. Although the last match between Peruvians and Colombians ended in a 1–1 draw, a score that favored the visitors due to a better goal difference, both coaches had agreed that if this happened, they would decide the championship via a penalty shoot-out. However, América de Cali's players did not want to go through with the shoot-out, and given this refusal, Miguel Torres received the trophy. The international four-team tournament also served to pay tribute to Gustavo Grondona and the 2010 Nobel Prize in Literature laureate Mario Vargas Llosa, an acknowledged fan and honorary member of the club.

Meanwhile, in the league the club had its worst season start in history after being defeated during the first three games of the season. The team quickly recovered with three straight wins and not again suffer defeat until the twelfth journey when they lost by 1–0 before the León de Huánuco in visitor status. Once again several problems dirigenciales and constant technical changes not allowed the team to have a good season.

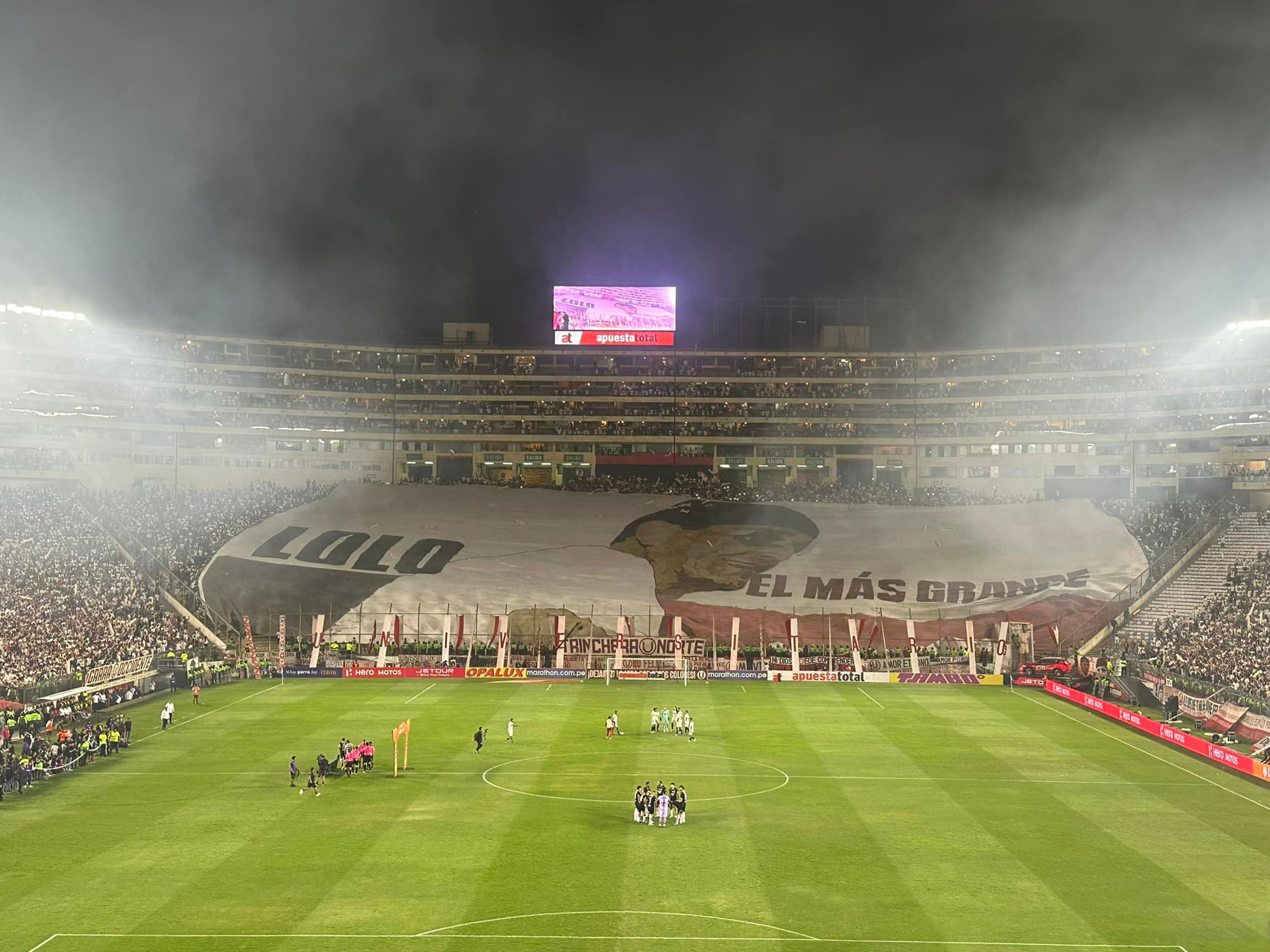
Universitario at the 2023 Liga 1 final against Alianza Lima

During the first part of the tournament, the Chamber of Conciliation and Dispute Resolution Peruvian Football Federation took away two points for having an outstanding debt to Ricardo Gareca and finished in fifth place with 51 points product of 16 wins, 5 draws and 9 defeats. In the second stage championship of the "U" joined the league odd in which it scored 5 wins and 6 ties for a total of 72 points and obtained the qualification for the Copa Sudamericana 2011.

In the 2011 Peruvian Championship, the team did not have a good start and it was only in the third round that they obtained their first victory; However, little by little, he began to raise his level and came to close his participation in the first phase at the top of the table. During the second phase of the tournament, the club was saved from relegation in the penultimate round after drawing 2–2 with Universidad César Vallejo at the Estadio Nacional. At the international level, the club showed a different face and for the first time in its history advanced to the quarterfinals of the Copa Sudamericana where they were eliminated by Vasco da Gama from Brazil by an aggregate score of 5–4. Due to the large debts of some football clubs in Peru (including Universitario), the National Customs and Tax Administration Superintendence requested the National Institute for the Defense of Competition and the Protection of Intellectual Property to initiate a bankruptcy process to restructure the club. With this measure, the board of directors was disintegrated and Rocío Chávez Pimentel, president of Right Business S.A., was appointed temporary administrator of the club.

Internationally the club showed a different face and for the first time in its history advanced to the quarterfinals of the Copa Sudamericana, where it was eliminated by Brazil's Vasco da Gama on a 5–4 aggregate score. Raúl Ruidíaz was the club's top scorer with four goals. In June 2011 the first edition of the U-20 Copa Libertadores was held in Peru, which the merengue squad ultimately won after beating Boca Juniors 5–4 in a penalty shoot-out in the final.

==== Start of the insolvency proceedings and the twenty-sixth star (2012–2015) ====
Due to the large debts of some Peruvian football clubs (among them Universitario), the executive branch published an emergency decree to save these teams. For this reason, the National Superintendency of Customs and Tax Administration (SUNAT) requested that the National Institute for the Defense of Competition and Protection of Intellectual Property (INDECOPI) begin the club's restructuring insolvency proceedings. With this measure the board of directors was dissolved and INDECOPI appointed Rocío Chávez Pimentel, representative of Right Business S.A., as the club's temporary administrator.

In 2012, as a consequence of the austerity policy implemented by the Temporary Administration, Universitario had a small squad that did not allow it to face the tournament satisfactorily, so much so that fears arose about its continued place in the top division. For this reason, at the end of the first round José Guillermo del Solar was removed from the coaching position and Nolberto Solano was appointed in his place, obtaining better results than his predecessor, and at the end of the tournament the club finished eleventh in the accumulated table.

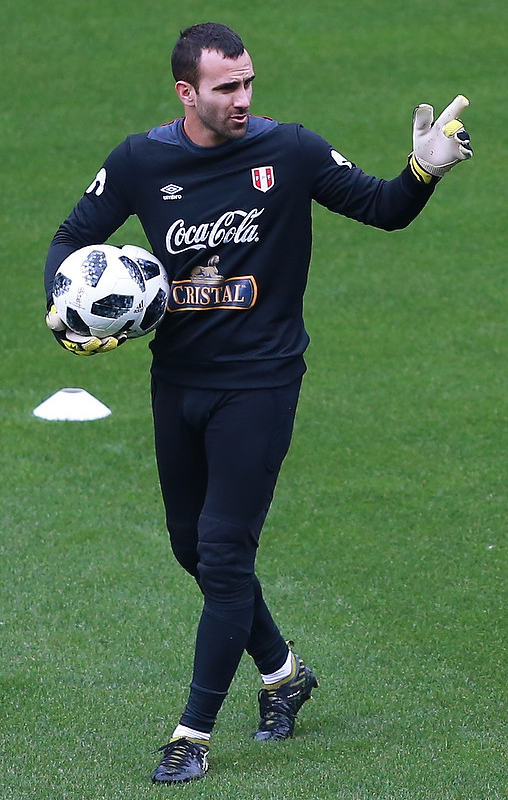
José Carvallo, the club's starting goalkeeper during the 2013 season.

For the 2013 season, the Temporary Administration maintained its austerity policy and decided to face the tournament with a team made up mostly of young footballers, many of them from the club's youth divisions. At the end of the first stage of the tournament the «U» managed to place second in the standings, which allowed it to lead liguilla B, while Real Garcilaso finished at the top of liguilla A after finishing first in the table. After this second stage was played, both teams finished at the top of their respective liguillas, and so they had to face each other to decide the national champion.

In the first leg played at the Estadio Municipal de Espinar, Garcilaso defeated Universitario 3–2, while in the second leg played at the Estadio Monumental the crema team won 3–0. The third and deciding match, played at the Estadio Huancayo, ended in a 1–1 draw after regular and extra time, so the decision had to be made via a penalty shoot-out, which ended 5–4 in favor of the merengues, who thus obtained their twenty-sixth national title. That same year, the club broke the historic attendance record in Peruvian football.

During the start of the 2014 campaign, the club had a downturn both in the domestic tournament and in the Copa Libertadores, where it only obtained one point, leading to the departure of coach Ángel Comizzo and the return of José Guillermo del Solar. In the Apertura Tournament, and with new signings such as Edison Flores, the «U» had a brief recovery (even thrashing its opponent in its debut), however it lost key points at home and on the last matchday was defeated 2–0 by Juan Aurich, with whom it was fighting neck and neck for the tournament. For the Clausura Tournament they signed former goalkeeper Óscar Ibáñez as coach and he debuted with a 0–1 win over Sport Huancayo, after fifteen matchdays the team achieved six wins, six losses and three draws, finishing seventh in the standings and sixth in the accumulated table, qualifying as Peru 3 for the 2015 Copa Sudamericana.

The year 2015 could be described for Universitario as an epic with a «happy ending», since at the start of the year, with Ibáñez and new players who generated great expectation among the fanbase such as Carlos Grossmüller and Liber Quiñones, the team nonetheless did not stand out. Alongside them, Braynner García, Raúl Fernández and five youth players also arrived. In that same year's Torneo del Inca, the «U» only achieved three wins, for which Óscar Ibáñez was dismissed and Carlos Silvestri took charge of the team, until Colombian Luis Fernando Suárez was confirmed as the new crema strategist. The start of the Apertura was very difficult for the «U», particularly in the first three matchdays where it did not achieve any wins, only obtaining a victory over Ayacucho in the fourth matchday.

Then came another bad run that included a loss in the derby and the termination of the contracts of Grossmüller and Quiñones; this drought lasted seven matchdays, ending with a win over Universidad de San Martín in Callao. In the following matchday León de Huánuco thrashed the cremas in Ate, a result that left the club at the bottom of the table and on the verge of relegation. Finally, on matchday fifteen it climbed out of the relegation zone after beating Sport Loreto in Pucallpa with a goal from Roberto Siucho. On the first matchday of the Clausura, Universitario lost 2–3 to Unión Comercio, a result that led to Luis Fernando Suárez's departure from the club. Roberto Chale took his place, alongside Juan Pajuelo, and a run of positive results began together with Raúl Ruidíaz and his 12 goals in the tournament, even coming close to fighting for it. Universitario qualified for the 2016 Copa Sudamericana after beating Sporting Cristal 2–1 on the last matchday.

==== National tournaments (2016–2019) ====
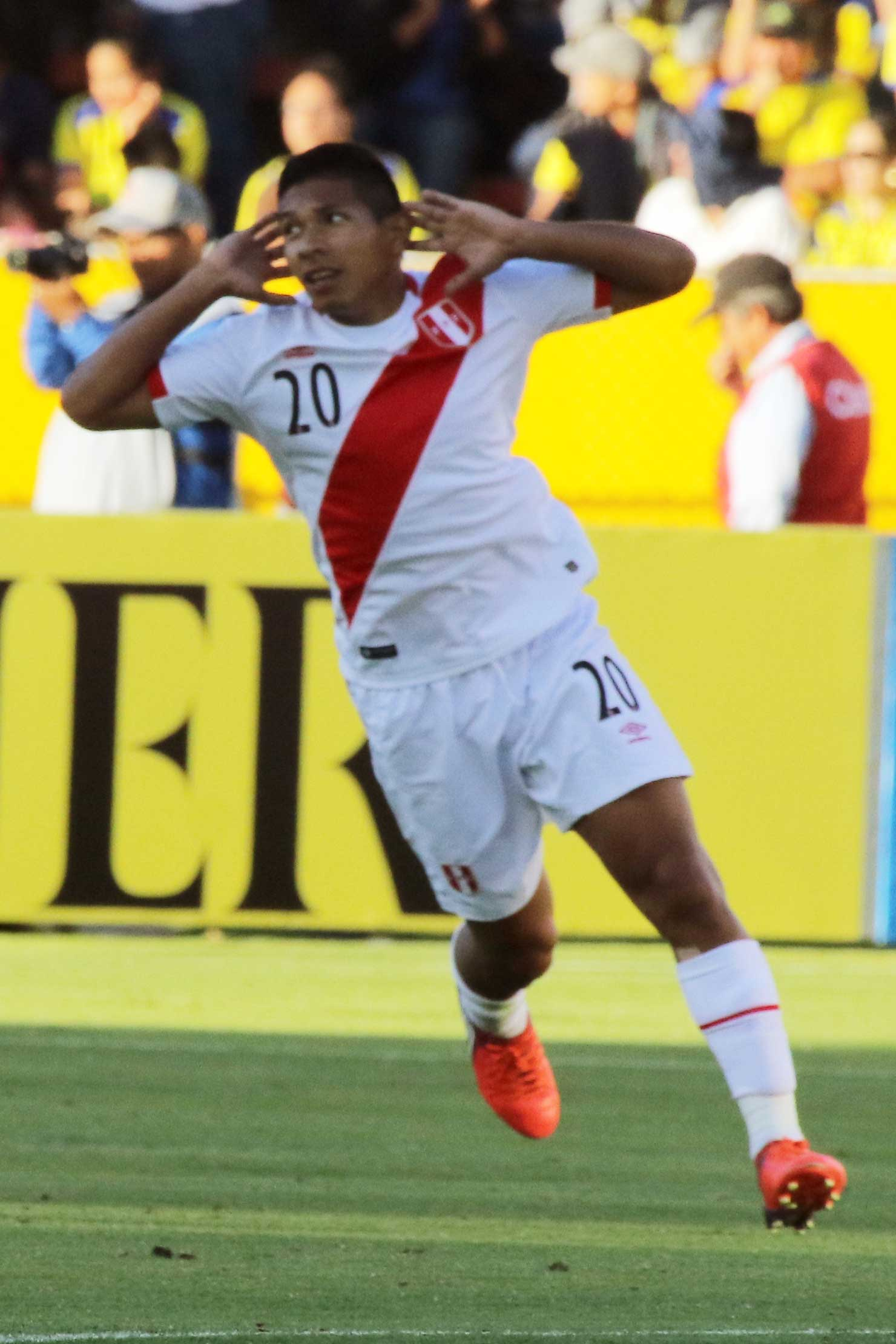
Edison Flores, footballer who played for the «U» across two spells (2011–2012) and (2014–2016).

In 2016 the «U» started the Apertura Tournament with a 5–2 win in Ayacucho, with a hat-trick from Diego Guastavino, one of the year's signings alongside Diego Manicero, Miguel Trauco, Hernán Rengifo and Adán Balbín; it won the championship by beating Sporting Cristal on matchday 14 and qualified for the 2017 Copa Sudamericana. In the Clausura Tournament it suffered a downturn due to the absence of players such as Raúl Ruidíaz (who moved to Mexican football), Edison Flores and Juan Diego Gutiérrez (both transferred to Danish football), finishing second and being eliminated from the Copa Sudamericana by Emelec.

For the liguillas Juan Pablo Pino, Josué Estrada, Diego Rodríguez and John Galliquio were signed, and Alexi Gómez was repatriated from Chilean football. On matchday 14 the team qualified for the semifinals of the national tournament, where it faced Melgar. In the first leg played at the National Stadium it started off winning 1–0 with a goal from Galliquio but ended up losing 1–2; in the second leg played in Arequipa the «U» was winning 0–2 with goals from Diego Manicero and Andy Polo, but in the second half of the match, due to player fatigue, it ended up drawing 2–2, thereby losing the tie.

After losing, it had to play a third-place match against Deportivo Municipal, a match that was tied 2–2 with goals from Alexi Gómez and Hernán Rengifo, until in the 92nd minute the latter scored the winning goal (3–2), thus qualifying for the 2017 Copa Libertadores. The club's participation in that tournament ended in the second phase after squandering a two-goal advantage obtained away (3–1) against Paraguay's Deportivo Capiatá, losing the return leg at the Estadio Monumental 3–0.

In the 2018 Decentralized Championship, the «U» finished in ninth place in the accumulated table with 56 points. The club carried out a rezoning of Campo Mar - U and registered it with the Public Registries under the ZRE (Special Regulation Zone) zoning, which was approved by the Metropolitan Municipality of Lima through Ordinance No. 2133-MML published in the Diario Oficial El Peruano on December 7, 2018. On January 8 and 10, 2019, the National Superintendency of Public Registries proceeded to register, in Entry B0001 of Records No. 42248290 and 42248304 of the Lima Property Registry, the Urban and Building Parameters of the two Campomar plots, designated Plot A and Plot B. On the sporting side, the men's first team obtained 56 points, finishing fourth in the accumulated table of the 2019 Liga1, after winning 15 matches, drawing 11 and losing 8. During the second half of the championship it was in the lead but fell off in the final matchdays.

=== 2020s ===
==== Suspension of the insolvency proceedings (2020–2023) ====
Universitario began the 2020 tournament under the guidance of Gregorio Pérez, obtaining a 2–0 win in the Peruvian derby at the Estadio Monumental on March 8, 2020. Five days later a quarantine was decreed due to the COVID-19 pandemic and the championship was suspended. The tournament was later resumed but without spectators present. Ángel Comizzo returned as head coach and with him the cremas won Phase 1 and earned the right to dispute the play-offs against Sporting Cristal. The «U» lost the first final and drew the second, finishing as Peruvian runner-up. The student squad began Phase 1 2021 by drawing 1–1 against Melgar. On the second matchday, playing with several youth players and without several of its foreign players, it lost 3–1 to Cantolao. Before the third matchday was played it was detected that more than fourteen employees of the institution had tested positive for COVID-19, so the match against Universidad Técnica de Cajamarca was suspended.

On the fourth matchday it obtained its first win against San Martín. On May 23, on the last matchday of Phase 1, the «U» drew 0–0 against Carlos A. Mannucci. In the Copa Libertadores the club lost its first three matches in group A against Palmeiras (champion of the 2020 Copa Libertadores), Defensa y Justicia (champion of the 2020 Copa Sudamericana), and Independiente del Valle (champion of the 2019 Copa Sudamericana). In the second round it drew at home against Defensa y Justicia. On the fifth matchday of the group stage, the cremas won at home 3–2 against Independiente del Valle. They began the match losing, but turned it around with two goals from Álex Valera and one from Nelinho Quina. And in the last match, with 10 players on the pitch, following the sending-off of Alberto Quintero, the «U» lost 6–0 to Palmeiras in Brazil, equaling its worst defeat at international level after the 6–0 loss to Argentina's Rosario Central in 2001.

On May 25 the creditors' board of Universitario de Deportes approved the appointment of Luis Sierralta as new administrator, replacing Sonia Alva, who had held the position since August 2020. Sierralta's appointment, proposed by Gremco Corp, was approved with 56% of the votes in favor. 5% voted against and 39% abstained. In the Copa Bicentenario, the merengue team, without its national team players, was eliminated in the round of 32 after being defeated 1–0 by Coopsol, a second division team. On June 15, Law 31279 was published in the Diario Oficial El Peruano, regulating the insolvency proceedings process supporting football activity in Peru.

With this, the National Superintendency of Customs and Tax Administration had to take charge of the clubs involved. On August 20, 2021, INDECOPI's Insolvency Proceedings Commission informed the institution that it had decided to provisionally suspend the club's insolvency proceedings, as well as the calling, holding and execution of Creditors' Board agreements, and the powers of Alta Sierra Asesores y Consultores S.A.C. as administrator, in application of Law 31279. Five days later SUNAT appointed former footballer Jean Ferrari as provisional administrator. Universitario began Phase 2 2021 with a 2–2 draw against Alianza Atlético. On matchday seven Alianza Lima won the derby 2–1, after which the club announced the end of Ángel Comizzo's tenure as head coach. In his place Juan Pajuelo was appointed interim coach of the first team. On September 1 Gregorio Pérez was announced as the new head coach.

Starting the 2022 season, Universitario reinforced its squad with the arrival of Uruguayan Ángel Cayetano and Peruvians Joao Villamarín, Roberto Villamarín and Alfonso Barco. However, on January 13, Gregorio Pérez suffered a heart attack that was later confirmed as coronary syndrome. Due to his delicate state of health, Pérez was forced to leave the club for a second time, and his assistant Edgardo Adinolfi was named interim coach. Shortly afterward, the «U» received an invitation to play a friendly against David Beckham's Inter Miami in the United States, a match that ended 4–0 in favor of the home side.

In its traditional Noche Crema, it lost 3–2 against Ecuador's Aucas. Following these poor results, Adinolfi was replaced by Manuel Barreto as interim coach for the debut against Academia Deportiva Cantolao in 2022 Liga 1. With Barreto, Universitario thrashed Cantolao 3–0, breaking a five-year run without victories against the Callao club. On February 3, Jean Ferrari, at a press conference, announced Uruguayan Álvaro Gutiérrez as the new coach for the rest of the season, who debuted with a 3–0 win over Universidad de San Martín. In the second phase of the 2022 Copa Libertadores, the club was eliminated by Ecuador's Barcelona after losing 2–0 away and 1–0 at home. Given these results, the subsequent signings of Andy Polo, who returned to the club after six years, and Rodrigo Vilca were announced to face the rest of the season. However, after losing at home to Alianza Lima 4–1, Gutiérrez's dismissal was announced just two months after his hiring, leaving a record of four wins, one draw and six losses.

Jorge Araujo, Coordinator of the Youth Technical Unit, was appointed interim coach and had a decent run over six matches (two wins, three draws and one loss). Ferrari announced Barreto as the club's new sporting manager, while Araujo returned to lead the reserve team while a new coach was sought for the senior team. On June 20, Carlos Compagnucci was announced as the new head coach, marking his return to the position after seventeen years. Under Compagnucci's direction, Universitario ended 2022 securing its place in the 2023 Copa Sudamericana, qualifying for the group stage after beating Cienciano del Cusco 2–0. Likewise, the departure of several players was announced, among them Alberto Quintero, Rafael Guarderas, Armando Alfageme, Federico Alonso and Nelinho Quina, among others. After the start of the 2023 season, the cremas debuted with a 4–0 thrashing of Cantolao, but suffered a string of poor results that led to Compagnucci's voluntary resignation, paving the way for the arrival of a more experienced coach.

On March 3, 2023, on Gregorio Pérez's recommendation, Jorge Fossati was announced as the crema squad's new coach, bringing with him a new crop of players, including the return of both Horacio Calcaterra, after ten years playing for Sporting Cristal, and Álex Valera, the latter after a brief spell in Saudi Arabia. Likewise, Universitario reinforced its squad with the arrival of high-caliber foreigners such as Rodrigo Ureña, Matías Di Benedetto, Williams Riveros, Martín Pérez Guedes and Emanuel Herrera, who had been the Peruvian Primera División's all-time top foreign scorer, as well as the return of Edison Flores to the club that saw him grow after seven years. Fossati's playing scheme brought excellent results in the domestic tournament, favoring Piero Quispe as a starter and giving the captaincy to Aldo Corzo.

In the 2023 Copa Sudamericana group stage, Universitario debuted with a historic 0–1 win over Gimnasia y Esgrima de La Plata, breaking a 56-year run without winning on Argentine soil, and drew 2–2 at home against Brazil's Goiás, after having been down 0–2. Obtaining favorable results at home against Colombia's Independiente Santa Fe and Gimnasia y Esgrima, Universitario secured its qualification to the round of 16 of the international tournament, where it was eliminated by Brazil's Corinthians in a controversial home-and-away tie. The club once again focused on the domestic championship, winning unbeaten at home against every club except Deportivo Garcilaso, with which it drew 1–1. These results allowed it to rise, on the last matchday against Sport Huancayo, as champion of the 2023 Clausura Tournament, a title it had not won in twenty-three years.

In a historic event, Universitario managed to reach the final of the 2023 Liga1 alongside its classic rival Alianza Lima, which had come off winning the Apertura Tournament, resulting in a Peruvian superclásico final being played for the first time in fourteen years. In the first leg, at a packed Estadio Monumental, both squads drew 1–1 with goals from Álex Valera for the cremas and Gabriel Costa for the blanquiazules in the final minutes. In the second leg played at the Estadio Alejandro Villanueva, Universitario won 0–2 with goals from Edison Flores and Horacio Calcaterra, rising after ten years with the national title, taking its lap of honor at its greatest historic rival's stadium for the third consecutive time.

==== Centenary year and a second Treble (2024-2025) ====
Universitario began its centenary season as the reigning champion of the Peruvian tournament. However, due to the excellent results of the previous year, Jorge Fossati reached a mutual agreement with the club and left to become the new coach of the Peru national team following the departure of Juan Reynoso. Because of this, Universitario announced Argentine Fabián Bustos as the centenary coach, along with the arrival of foreign players Diego Dorregaray, Segundo Portocarrero and Sebastián Britos. Likewise, it strengthened its squad with the arrival of Jairo Concha, Christopher Olivares and the return of Christofer Gonzales after nine years.

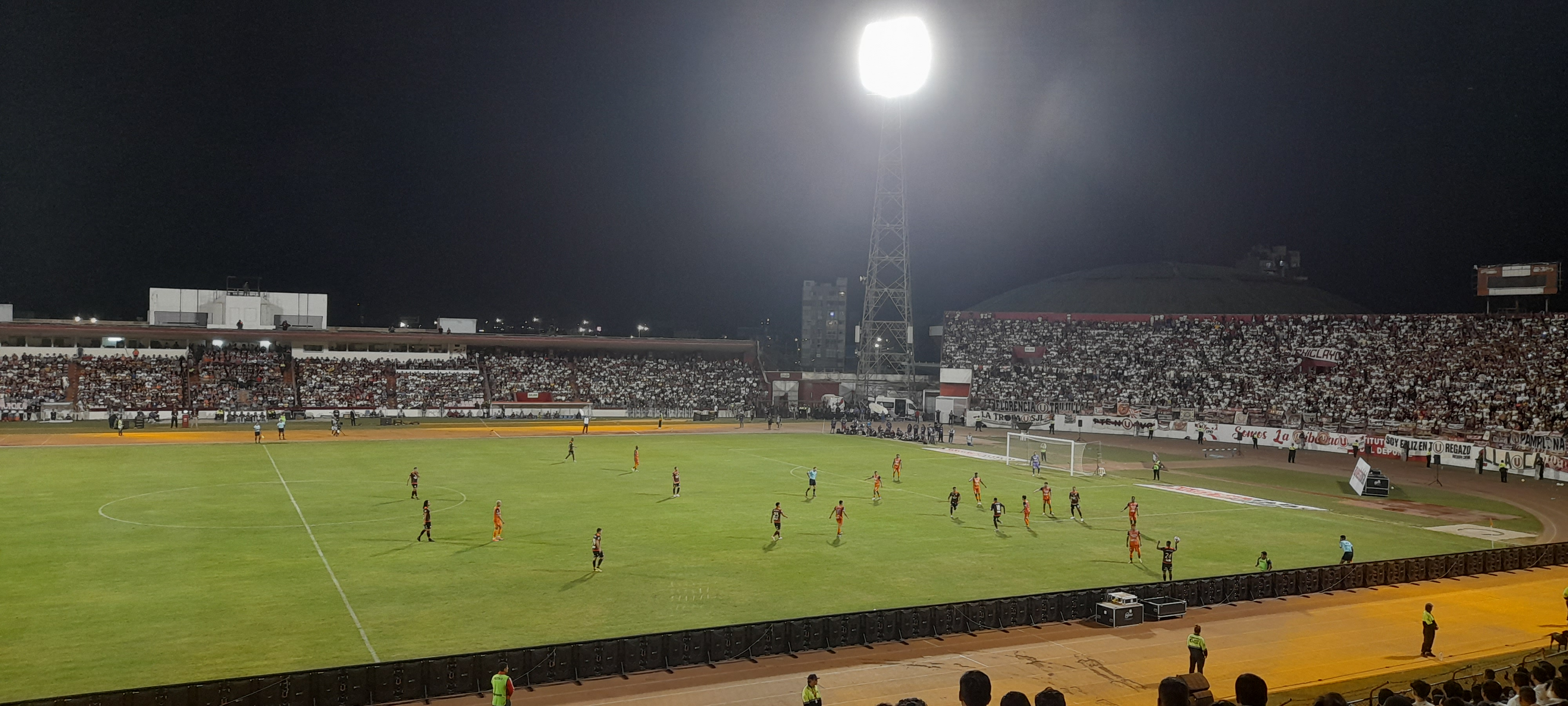
Universitario facing César Vallejo on matchday 9 of the 2024 Apertura Tournament at the Estadio Mansiche.

The cremas started the 2024 tournament with a 4–0 thrashing of Carlos A. Mannucci and continued a run of perfect results until matchday 4, after beating Atlético Grau 1–0 and Melgar 2–0 at home, and Alianza Lima 1–0 away. From matchday 5 to 10 the «U» obtained three draws (all away), against UTC, Deportivo Garcilaso and César Vallejo, and three wins (all at home) against Sport Huancayo, Cusco and Alianza Atlético.

In the Copa Libertadores group stage, Universitario started with a 2–1 win in Lima against LDU and a 1–1 away draw against Junior, then suffered an away defeat to Botafogo 3–1, making it fight for a spot in the Copa Libertadores round of 16 or a place in the Copa Sudamericana play-offs; although it drew at home against Junior 1–1 and lost 1–0 to Botafogo, ending its chance to qualify for the next phase of the Copa Libertadores, but still with a chance to qualify for the Copa Sudamericana, after an away loss to LDU 2–0, the merengues thus closed out their participation in an international tournament.

In the domestic tournament it did achieve its goal, with a string of good results, continuing with three new wins, though it would suffer its first and only defeat of the Apertura Tournament, against ADT, 2–0 away. On May 25, 2024, Universitario was crowned Apertura winner after beating Los Chankas 4–0 and matching Sporting Cristal on 40 points, but surpassing it on goal difference, qualifying for the Liga 1 play-offs and the 2025 Copa Libertadores.

During the 2025 "Noche Crema," the club officially presented its squad by facing the Panama national team at the Estadio Monumental; the match marked the start of their 101st season and saw them play against a national team for the first time in decades. Days later, the team played an international friendly against Inter Miami, whose lineup included Lionel Messi, Luis Suárez, Sergio Busquets, and Jordi Alba, among others. In the first half of 2025, the team won the Apertura Tournament title after a 0–0 draw with Los Chankas on the final matchday. This marked their fourth consecutive short-tournament title, a national record since the format was introduced in Peruvian football.

In the 2025 Copa Libertadores, Universitario advanced past the group stage to the Round of 16, marking their best continental performance in years. In the Round of 16, they faced the Brazilian side Palmeiras. In the first leg in Lima, they suffered a crushing 0–4 defeat. In the return leg in Brazil, the match ended in a 0–0 draw; despite a more respectable showing, the deficit from the first leg proved decisive, and Universitario was eliminated from the competition. In the 2025 Clausura Tournament, Universitario clinched the title with a 2–1 victory over ADT in Tarma, with goals from Matías Di Benedetto and Álex Valera. With this win, the club secured its twenty-ninth national title and third consecutive championship (2023, 2024, 2025), thereby achieving a "three-peat" in its modern history.

== Colors and badge ==
Universitario's first kit
2023

Universitario's colors are cream (crema in Spanish), burgundy (granate in Spanish), and black. When playing a home game they use the cream-colored kit with black socks and when playing away they use the burgundy-colored kit with black socks.

The club's colors at first were not cream. They started with a white kit that had the badge on the chest. During one of their early seasons, Universitario could not participate in an upcoming match because their uniforms had been sent to the laundry to be washed. The managers pleaded that they hurry with the laundry and they quickly washed them. However, when the club received the jerseys, they found that they were no longer white, but yellow. The laundry workers had forgotten to remove the badges from the jerseys and consequently the red color from the badges mixed with the white jerseys giving it a yellow tint. The club had no choice but to use the jersey to play. They managed to win that game and a few others as well and thus the club kept the new-colored kit as a good-luck charm.

The badge is a red U inside a deep-red circle drawn by Luis Malaga, one of the founders of the club.

== Stadium ==
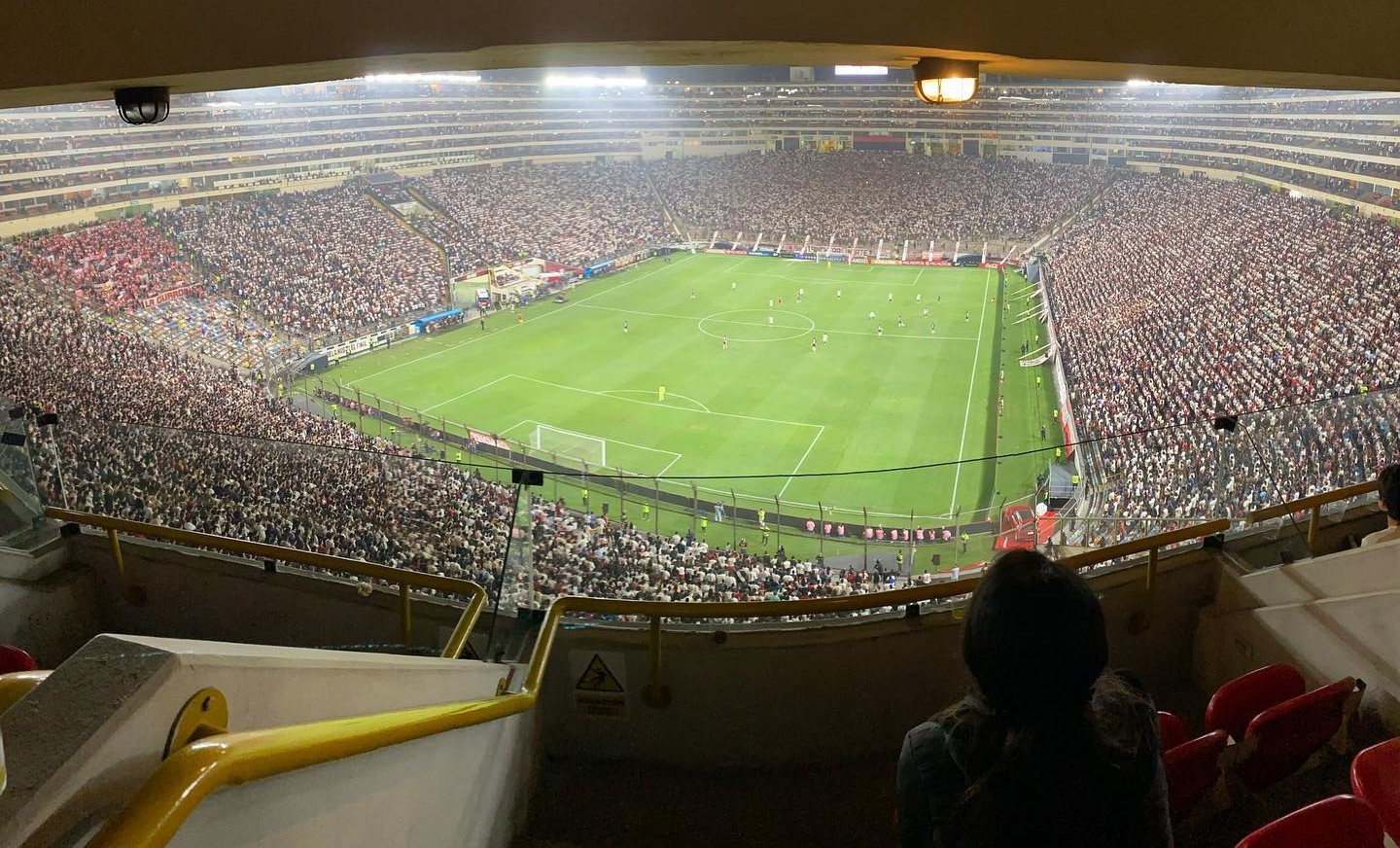
Estadio Monumental "U"

Universitario's first stadium was Estadio Lolo Fernandez. It had a capacity of 15,000. Its capacity was reduced to 4,000 and now serves as a football academy for its club members and hosts football games for the Segunda División reserve team América Cochahuayco and youth teams in the youth divisions. It was built in honor of Teodoro "Lolo" Fernandez, Universitario's most revered player.

Estadio Monumental is a stadium that was built by the Peruvian construction company Gremco throughout the 1990s and opened in 2000, replacing Estadio Lolo Fernandez and the Nacional. The inauguration game was between Universitario and Sporting Cristal; Universitario won 2–0. It was given to Universitario the same year it was opened and they now own the largest stadium in Peru with a seating capacity of 80,093. This stadium is the second largest in South America. Its eastern and western stands are all-seaters and its northern and southern stands have standing terraces. Exactly 1,250 luxury boxes, known as palcos, are above the stands.

The stadium was deemed not fit to host the classic derby between Universitario and Alianza Lima between 2002 and 2007 by the Peruvian Police. The first time this stadium hosted the derby was on 26 June 2002—the first leg of the Apertura play-off—where Universitario won 1–0. Alianza's fans, in the southern stand, reacted violently to the loss by vandalizing the premises and causing two reported stabbings. Consequently, La U was forced to play all future derbies at Estadio Nacional where the Instituto Peruano del Deporte installed artificial turf which is constantly criticized by the First Division players. For the next five years, this derby was not played at this stadium. On 14 September 2008, the derby returned to the Estadio Monumental with a loss for Universitario.

This stadium was rejected as a venue for the Copa América 2004 because of problems with Alfredo Gonzalez, President of Universitario de Deportes, and the stadium's owners. Many saw this as a typical bullying behavior on the part of the president since this stadium would have been the perfect venue to host the 2004 Copa América intro as well as final games.

== Supporters ==
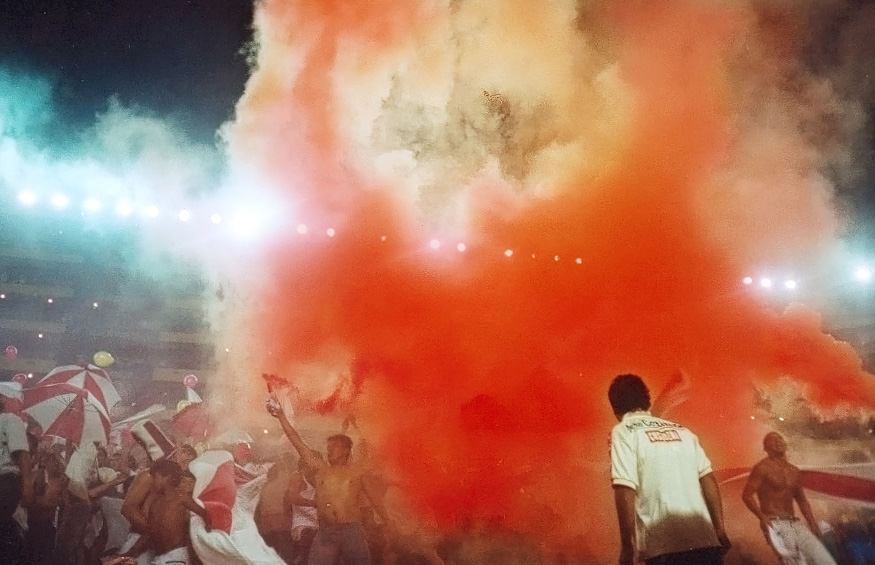
Barra Oriente

Universitario's supporters are one of the largest in Peru, only rivaled by Alianza Lima's supporters. Universitario's ultra groups are known as Barra Oriente and Trinchera Norte. Asociación Barra Dale U, the official name of the Barra Oriente, started in 1968 that notably grown over the years. Trinchera Norte is a barra brava that was formed in 1988; in contrast to Alianza Lima's supporters, named "Comando Svr", "Sicarios", and others. The two most popular teams in Peru are Universitario and Alianza Lima. They are at the top of the polls conducted by many different groups. The group Apoyo, Opinion y Mercado in 2006 revealed that Alianza Lima was popular amongst 35%, followed by Universitario, with 32%. In 2005, a study by Grupo de Opinión Pública de la Universidad de Lima showed that Universitario was the most popular team in Lima and Callao with 31.7% followed by Alianza Lima with 29.3%. However, in 2006 and 2007 Alianza Lima appeared first in their polls. There was a narrow margin in 2007 as Alianza Lima reached 29.6% and Universitario followed with 29.5% under a margin of error of ±4.16% In 2009, the university's results varied because Alianza reached first with 40% and Universitario second with 35.5% under a margin of error of ±4.47%. Another group known as CPI, revealed in May 2008 that Universitario was favored by 32% whilst Alianza Lima was favored by 33.5% under a margin of error of 2.7% at the national level. This report was divided into two parts. In the metropolitan capital, Universitario led with 42.8% and Alianza tailed behind with 39.9%. In the rest of the country, Universitario had a larger lead with 31.5% opposed to Alianza's 24.1%. In 2009, CPI released another poll indicating the Universitario was still the most popular team in Peru with 38.6% while Alianza reached 33.1%. A survey conducted by Grupo de Opinión Pública de la Universidad de Lima in February 2009, said that Alianza Lima ranked first in popularity with 27.2%; Universitario second with 26.6%. However, a second poll released by the same university group in September of the same year ranked Universitario first with 37.9% and Alianza second with 36.6%.

The most recent report from the group indicates that Universitario has more sympathizers than Alianza with 40.6% over 36.% in the Province of Lima and Callao. In 2010, the South American Football Confederation (Conmebol) stated that Alianza Lima is the most popular team in Perú.

In the 2026 Apertura, Universitario drew the highest attendance in the league, recording a total of 333,899 spectators in nine home games, resulting in an average attendance of 37,100.

== Players ==
=== Current squad ===
As of 17 August 2026

Note: Flags indicate national team as defined under FIFA eligibility rules; some limited exceptions apply. Players may hold more than one non-FIFA nationality.

No.	Pos.	Nation	Player
1	GK	PER	Diego Romero
2	DF	ARG	Cain Fara
3	DF	PAR	Williams Riveros
4	DF	PER	Anderson Santamaría
5	DF	ARG	Matías Di Benedetto
8	FW	ARG	Héctor Fértoli (on loan from Racing Club)
10	MF	PER	Horacio Calcaterra
11	FW	PER	José Rivera
12	GK	PER	Jhefferson Rodríguez
15	MF	ARG	Juan Manuel Requena
17	MF	PER	Jairo Concha
18	FW	PER	Gianluca Lapadula
19	FW	PER	Edison Flores
20	FW	PER	Alex Valera

No.	Pos.	Nation	Player
21	MF	PER	Jordan Guivin
23	MF	PER	Jorge Murrugarra
24	FW	PER	Andy Polo
25	GK	CHI	Miguel Vargas
28	MF	PER	Adrián Quiroz
29	DF	PER	Aldo Corzo (captain)
30	FW	ARG	Lisandro Alzugaray
33	DF	PER	César Inga
34	FW	PER	Christopher Loayza
35	MF	PER	Diogo Vásquez
36	MF	PER	Fabián Cabanillas
37	FW	PER	Nicolás Rengifo
39	MF	PER	Piero Quispe
70	DF	PAN	Jorge Abdiel Gutiérrez (on loan from Deportivo La Guaira)
77	FW	PER	Bryan Reyna (on loan from Belgrano)

=== Retired numbers ===
- 9 – (Peru) Teodoro "Lolo" Fernández, forward (1930–53) – Number retired since the 2013 season.
- 22 – (Peru) José Luis Carranza, midfielder (1986–04)

=== Out on loan ===
Note: Flags indicate national team as defined under FIFA eligibility rules; some limited exceptions apply. Players may hold more than one non-FIFA nationality.

No.	Pos.	Nation	Player
7	MF	PER	Yuriel Celi (at Sport Boys for the 2026 season)
14	DF	PER	Paolo Reyna (at ADC Juan Pablo II College for the 2026 season)
15	DF	PER	Julinho Astudillo (at Cusco FC for the 2026 season)

No.	Pos.	Nation	Player
21	GK	PER	Aamet Calderón (at Atlético Grau for the 2026 season)
31	MF	PER	Álvaro Rojas (at ADC Juan Pablo II College for the 2026 season)
55	DF	PER	Gustavo Dulanto (at Sport Boys for the 2026 season)

== Personnel ==
Current technical staff

See also: List of Universitario de Deportes managers

As of 11 May 2026

Position	Name
Manager	(Argentina) Héctor Cúper
Assistant manager	(Argentina) Carlos Amodeo
Assistant manager	(Argentina) Santiago Cúper
Physical trainer	(Argentina) Zacarías Gaggero
Assistant physical trainer	(Peru) Eusebio Flores
Technical advisor	(Peru) Héctor Chumpitaz
Goalkeeper manager	(Peru) Ángel Venegas

=== Noted managers ===
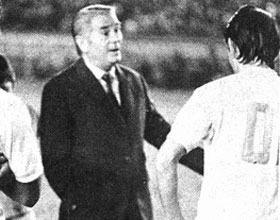
Roberto Scarone won three first division titles with Universitario and led the team to their first and only final of the Copa Libertadores in 1972. Scarone would later become manager of the Peru national football team.

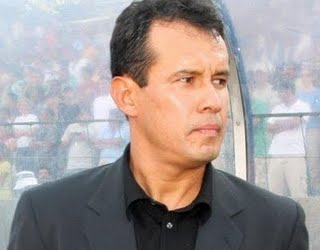
Juan Reynoso won Universitario's twenty-fifth division title in 2009.

Seventeen managers won at least one major trophy with the club but only fourteen won the Primera División. Arturo Fernández and Marcos Calderon won a record four major titles with the club. Roberto Scarone won 3 first division titles and also led the club to its first Copa Libertadores final in 1972. Universitario's first manager, Mario de las Casas, led the club to its first championship as a player-manager. Jack Greenwell, the club's only English manager in its history, won the club's second first division title and went on to succeed with the Peru national football team.

Three managers—Miguel Company, Ángel Cappa, and Ricardo Gareca—won a Torneo Apertura trophy but did not win the national championship. Company left the team shortly after winning the 1999 Torneo Apertura whilst Cappa resigned from his position after winning the 2002 Torneo Apertura due to financial difficulties in the club. Gareca was unable to reach the final championship match because of a string of poor results in the 2008 Torneo Clausura.

Manager	Period	Trophies
(Peru) Mario de las Casas	1928–29, 1934	2 Primera División
(England) Jack Greenwell	1939	1 Primera División
(Peru) Arturo Fernández	1941–49	4 Primera División
(Peru) Segundo Castillo	1959–62	2 Primera División
(Peru) Marcos Calderón	1964–67, 1985–86	4 Primera División
(Uruguay) Roberto Scarone	1969–74	3 Primera División
(Uruguay) Juan Hohberg	1974	1 Primera División
(Peru) Juan Carlos Oblitas	1987–90	1 Primera División
(Peru) Fernando Cuellar	1990, 1994	1 Primera División
(Serbia) Ivica Brzić	1991–93, 1997	1 Primera División
(Uruguay) Sergio Markarián	1993–94, 1995–96	1 Primera División
(Argentina) Osvaldo Piazza	1997–98	1 Primera División
(Peru) Miguel Company	1999	1 Torneo Apertura
(Peru) Roberto Challe	1999–01, 2015–17	2 Primera División
(Argentina) Ángel Cappa	2002	1 Torneo Apertura
(Argentina) Ricardo Gareca	2007–08	1 Torneo Apertura
(Peru) Juan Reynoso	2009–10	1 Primera División
(Argentina) Ángel Comizzo	2013–14	1 Primera División
(Uruguay) Jorge Fossati	2023, 2025	2 Primera División
(Argentina) Fabián Bustos	2024–25	1 Primera División

=== Other managers ===
- (Peru) Ramón Quiroga (1993)
- (Peru) Freddy Ternero (1993)
- (Uruguay) Manuel Keosseián (1994)
- (Argentina) Eduardo Luján Manera (1996)
- (Peru) Javier Chirinos (interim) (2001)
- (Argentina) Osvaldo Piazza (2002)
- (Peru) Javier Chirinos (interim) (2002)
- (Uruguay) Ricardo "Tato" Ortiz (2003)
- (Peru) Javier Chirinos (interim) (2003)
- (Peru) Ramón Quiroga (2003)
- (Argentina) Oscar Malbernat (2004)
- (Argentina) Marcelo Trobbiani (2004)
- (Argentina) José Basualdo (2005)
- (Paraguay) Jorge Amado Nunes (2007)
- (Argentina) Ricardo Gareca (2008)
- (Peru) Juan Reynoso (2009–10)
- (Argentina) Salvador Capitano (2010)
- (Peru) Javier Chirinos (interim) (2010)
- (Peru) José del Solar (2010–11)
- (Peru) Nolberto Solano (2012)
- (Argentina) Ángel Comizzo (2013–14)
- (Peru) José del Solar (2014)
- (Peru) Óscar Ibáñez (2014–15)
- (Colombia) Luis Fernando Suárez (2015)
- (Peru) Roberto Chale (2015–17)
- (Argentina) Pedro Troglio (2017–18)
- (Chile) Nicolás Córdova (2018–2019)
- (Argentina) Ángel Comizzo (2019)
- (Uruguay) Gregorio Perez (2020)
- (Argentina) Ángel Comizzo (2020–2021)
- (Uruguay) Gregorio Perez (2021)
- (Uruguay) Alvaro Gutierrez (2022)
- (Argentina) Carlos Compagnucci (2022–2023)

== Honours ==
=== Senior titles ===
Keys

- Record
- ^{(s)} Shared record

Type	Competition	Titles	Runner-up	Winning years	Runner-up years
National (League)	Liga 1	29	15	1929, 1934, 1939, 1941, 1945, 1946, 1949, 1959, 1960, 1964, 1966, 1967, 1969, 1971, 1974, 1982, 1985, 1987, 1990, 1992, 1993, 1998, 1999, 2000, 2009, 2013, 2023, 2024, 2025	1928, 1932, 1933, 1940, 1955, 1965, 1970, 1972, 1978,1984, 1988, 1995, 2002, 2008, 2020
Half-year / Short tournament (League)	Torneo Apertura	9	2	1998, 1999, 2000, 2002, 2008, 2016, 2020, 2024, 2025	1969, 2005
Half-year / Short tournament (League)	Torneo Clausura	4	6	2000, 2023, 2024, 2025	1997, 1999, 2006, 2007, 2016, 2019
Half-year / Short tournament (League)	Liguilla Pre-Libertadores	—	2	—	1996, 1997
Half-year / Short tournament (League)	Torneo Plácido Galindo	—	1	—	1989
Half-year / Short tournament (League)	Torneo Regional	4	4	1985, 1987, 1988, 1990–II	1981, 1989–II, 1990–I, 1991–II
Half-year / Short tournament (League)	Torneo Descentralizado	1	1	1985	1988
Half-year / Short tournament (League)	Torneo Zona Metropolitana	6	—	1984, 1987, 1988 Grupo A, 1989–II, 1990–I, 1991–II	—
Half-year / Short tournament (League)	Torneo de Primeros Equipos	1	2	1934	1932, 1933
Half-year / Short tournament (League)	Campeonato de Apertura (ANA)	3	4	1945, 1946, 1969	1947, 1955, 1956, 1961
National (Cups)	Copa Presidente de la República	1	—	1970	—
International (Cups)	Copa Libertadores	—	1	—	1972

=== Friendlies ===
Type	Competition	Titles	Runner-up	Winning years	Runner-up years
National (Cup)	Torneo Extraordinario	1	—	1936	—
National (Cup)	Torneo Relámpago	1	2	1960	1945, 1950
International (Cup)	Copa El Gráfico-Perú	1	4	2000	1999, 2001–I, 2001–II, 2005
International (Cup)	Copa San Juan II	1	—	2020	—

=== Youth team ===
Type	Competition	Titles	Runner-up	Winning years	Runner-up years
National (League)	Torneo de Promoción y Reservas	1	2	2024	2016, 2023
National (League)	Torneo Equipos de Reserva	6	5	1930, 1931, 1932, 1955, 1965, 1981	1933, 1934, 1937, 1941, 1951
Half-year / Short tournament (League)	Torneo Apertura (Juvenil Sub-18)	—	1	—	2025
Half-year / Short tournament (League)	Torneo del Inca (Reservas)	2	—	2014, 2015	—
Half-year / Short tournament (League)	Torneo Apertura (Reservas)	—	1	—	2016
Half-year / Short tournament (League)	Torneo Clausura (Reservas)	—	1	—	2016
International (Cups)	U-20 Copa Libertadores	1	—	2011	—

== Performance in CONMEBOL competitions ==
- Copa Libertadores: 36 appearances

1961, 1965, 1966, 1967, 1968, 1970, 1971, 1972, 1973, 1975, 1979, 1983, 1985, 1986, 1988, 1989, 1991, 1993, 1994, 1996, 1999, 2000, 2001, 2003, 2006, 2009, 2010, 2014, 2017, 2018, 2020, 2021, 2022, 2024, 2025, 2026

Runner-up (1): 1972

- Copa Sudamericana: 8 appearances

2002: First Stage
2005: First Stage
2007: First Stage
2008: First Stage
2011: Quarterfinals
2015: Second Stage
2016: First Stage
2023: Knockout round play-offs

- Copa CONMEBOL: 2 appearances

1992: First round
1997: Semifinals

- Copa Merconorte: 4 appearances

1998: Group Stage
1999: Group Stage
2000: Group Stage
2001: Group Stage

- U-20 Copa Libertadores: 3 appearances

2011: Champion
2012: Quarter-finals
2025: Group Stage

Season	Competition	Round	Opponent	Home	Away	Aggregate
1961	Copa Libertadores	First Round	(Uruguay) Peñarol	2-0	0–5	2-5
1965	Copa Libertadores	First Round	(Brazil) Santos FC	1-2	1-2	3rd
1965	Copa Libertadores	First Round	Club Universidad de Chile	1-0	2-5	3rd
1966	Copa Libertadores	First Round	(Argentina) River Plate	1-1	0-5	3rd
1966	Copa Libertadores	First Round	(Argentina) Boca Juniors	2-1	0-2	3rd
1966	Copa Libertadores	First Round	(Venezuela) Deportivo Italia	1-2	2-2	3rd
1966	Copa Libertadores	First Round	(Peru) Alianza Lima	2-0	1-0	3rd
1966	Copa Libertadores	First Round	(Venezuela) Lara F.C.	1-0	0-0	3rd

== Other sports ==
=== Futsal ===
Type	Competition	Titles	Runner-up	Winning years	Runner-up years
National (League)	Primera División Futsal Pro	3	4	2005, 2019, 2024	2006, 2022, 2023, 2025

- Copa Libertadores de Futsal: 2 appearances

2006: Quarterfinals
2021: 5th Place

=== Women's volleyball ===
Type	Competition	Titles	Runner-up	Winning years	Runner-up years
National (League)	Liga Intermedia de Voleibol	1	—	2024	—

== Ranking ==
IFFHS MEN'S CLUB WORLD RANKING 2023 at MAY 31 (Previous year rank in italics, IFFHS Club Coefficients in parentheses)

- 198 (216) (Turkey) Galatasaray S.K. (84)
- 199 (208) (England) Brentford F.C. (84)
- 201 (237) (Peru) Universitario de Deportes (83)
- 202 (207) (United States) Philadelphia Union (82,5)
- 203 (249) (Colombia) América de Cali (82,5)

== Records ==
- Seasons in Primera División: 94 (1928–2022) (Peruvian football's longest consecutive spell in Primera División)
- Record Primera División victory: 9–0 v. Atlético Torino (19 September 1970)
- Record Copa Libertadores victory: 6–0 v. Always Ready (27 Feb 1968)
- Record Primera División defeat:
  - 0–6 v. Sport Boys (1994)
  - 0–6 v. Deportivo Municipal (1937)
- Record Copa Libertadores defeat: 0–6 v. Rosario Central (21 Feb 2001)
- Longest unbeaten run: 36, 27 May 1974 to 27 February 1975 (Peruvian football's longest unbeaten run)
- Most appearances overall: 524, José Luis Carranza 1986–04
- Most goals scored in a season: 37, Eduardo Esidio 1998–00
- Most goals scored overall: 156, Teodoro "Lolo" Fernández 1930–53
- Most Primera División titles as player: 7, Ángel Uribe, Luis Cruzado, José Luis Carranza
- Most Primera División titles as manager: 4, Arturo Fernández, Marcos Calderón

=== Year-by-year ===
This is a partial list of the last five seasons completed by Universitario. For the full season-by-season history, see List of Universitario de Deportes seasons.

Season	League								Position		National cups		Continental / other		Tournament top goalscorer(s)	
Season	Competition	Pld	W	D	L	GF	GA	Pts	Pos	Play-offs (Note: Since 1966, play-off games have been used as a tie breaker between teams tie on points for promotion or relegation or as a post-season stage to decided the national championship. Whenever they have occurred, the club's position on that stage is shown in this column.)	National cups		Continental / other		Name(s)	Goals
2018	Torneo de Verano	14	2	7	5	16	21	13	8th	DNQ	—	—	Copa Libertadores	R1	—	—
2018	Torneo Apertura	15	4	6	5	18	21	18	11th	DNQ	—	—	Copa Libertadores	R1	—	—
2018	Torneo Clausura	15	8	2	5	20	17	26	4th	DNQ	—	—	Copa Libertadores	R1	—	—
2019	Torneo Apertura	17	6	5	6	25	27	23	12th	DNQ	Copa Bicentenario	QF	DNQ		(Argentina) Germán Denis	10
2019	Torneo Clausura	17	9	6	2	16	10	33	2nd	DNQ	Copa Bicentenario	QF	DNQ		(Argentina) Germán Denis	10
2020	Torneo Apertura	19	13	4	2	38	18	42	1st	2nd (Note: Universitario lost the Championship play-offs against Sporting Cristal.)	Copa Bicentenario	— (Note: The Copa Bicentenario was canceled due to the COVID-19 pandemic.)	Copa Libertadores	R2	(Peru) Alejandro Hohberg	13
2020	Torneo Clausura	9	3	2	4	12	17	11	6th	2nd	Copa Bicentenario	—	Copa Libertadores	R2	(Peru) Alejandro Hohberg	13
2021	Fase 1	9	4	3	2	12	11	15	3rd	3rd	Copa Bicentenario	R1	Copa Libertadores	GS	(Peru) Alex Valera	13
2021	Fase 2	17	9	5	3	31	19	32	3rd	3rd	Copa Bicentenario	R1	Copa Libertadores	GS	(Peru) Alex Valera	13
2022	Torneo Apertura	18	8	4	6	24	19	28	9th	DNQ	—	—	Copa Libertadores	R2	(Peru) Alex Valera	12
2022	Torneo Clausura	18	9	6	3	26	10	33	4th	DNQ	—	—	Copa Libertadores	R2	(Peru) Alex Valera	12

== Timeline ==
Timeline of Club Universitario de Deportes

- 1924: Foundation of Club Universitario de Deportes under the name Federación Universitaria de Fútbol.
- 1925: First unofficial match, Federación Universitaria 2–2 Sport José Gálvez.
- 1928: First official match, Federación Universitaria 7–1 José Olaya, and the first derby is played, won by Universitario - 2nd place, 1928 Amateur Tournament.
- 1929: Champion of the 1929 Amateur Tournament.
- 1930: 3rd, 1930 Amateur Tournament.
- 1931: 4th, 1931 Amateur Tournament - Teodoro Fernández Meyzán debuts.
- 1932: 2nd, 1932 Amateur Tournament.
- 1933: 2nd, 1933 Amateur Tournament. The Federación Universitaria de Fútbol changes its name to Club Universitario de Deportes.
- 1934: Champion of the 1934 Amateur Tournament.
- 1935: 3rd, 1935 Amateur Tournament.
- 1936: No championship held.
- 1937: 3rd, 1937 Amateur Tournament.
- 1938: 3rd, 1938 Amateur Tournament.
- 1939: Champion of the 1939 Amateur Tournament.
- 1940: 2nd, 1940 Amateur Tournament.
- 1941: Champion of the 1941 Amateur Tournament.
- 1942: 3rd, 1942 Amateur Tournament.
- 1943: 5th, 1943 Amateur Tournament.
- 1944: 3rd, 1944 Amateur Tournament.
- 1945: Champion of the 1945 Amateur Tournament.
- 1946: Champion of the 1946 Amateur Tournament.
- 1947: 8th, 1947 Amateur Tournament.
- 1948: 4th, 1948 Amateur Tournament.
- 1949: Champion of the 1949 Amateur Tournament - club's silver jubilee.
- 1950: 5th, 1950 Amateur Tournament.
- 1951: 6th, 1951 Professional Championship.
- 1952: 7th, 1952 Professional Championship - Inauguration of the Estadio Lolo Fernández.
- 1953: 6th, 1953 Professional Championship - Farewell of Teodoro Fernández Meyzán.
- 1954: 3rd, 1954 Professional Championship.
- 1955: 2nd, 1955 Professional Championship.
- 1956: 4th, 1956 Professional Championship.
- 1957: 2nd, 1957 Professional Championship.
- 1958: 4th, 1958 Professional Championship.
- 1959: Champion of the 1959 Professional Championship.
- 1960: Champion of the 1960 Professional Championship.
- 1961: 4th, 1961 Professional Championship - First round, 1961 Copa Libertadores.
- 1962: 3rd, 1962 Professional Championship.
- 1963: 3rd, 1963 Professional Championship.
- 1964: Champion of the 1964 Professional Championship.
- 1965: 2nd, 1965 Professional Championship - First round, 1965 Copa Libertadores.
- 1966: Champion of the 1966 Decentralized Championship - First round, 1966 Copa Libertadores.
- 1967: Champion of the 1967 Decentralized Championship - Semifinal, 1967 Copa Libertadores.
- 1968: 3rd, 1968 Decentralized Championship - Quarterfinal, 1968 Copa Libertadores.
- 1969: Champion of the 1969 Decentralized Championship.
- 1970: 2nd, 1970 Decentralized Championship - Quarterfinal, 1970 Copa Libertadores.
- 1971: Champion of the 1971 Decentralized Championship - Semifinal, 1971 Copa Libertadores.
- 1972: 2nd, 1972 Decentralized Championship - Runner-up, 1972 Copa Libertadores.
- 1973: 3rd, 1973 Decentralized Championship - First round, 1973 Copa Libertadores.
- 1974: Champion of the 1974 Decentralized Championship - Club's golden jubilee.
- 1975: 3rd, 1975 Decentralized Championship - Semifinal, 1975 Copa Libertadores.
- 1976: 4th, 1976 Decentralized Championship.
- 1977: 5th, 1977 Decentralized Championship.

- 1978: 2nd, 1978 Decentralized Championship.
- 1979: 5th, 1979 Decentralized Championship - First round, 1979 Copa Libertadores.
- 1980: 9th, 1980 Decentralized Championship.
- 1981: 3rd, 1981 Decentralized Championship.
- 1982: Champion of the 1982 Decentralized Championship.
- 1983: 3rd, 1983 Decentralized Championship - First round, 1983 Copa Libertadores - Inauguration of the Campo Mar - U Sports Complex.
- 1984: 2nd, 1984 Decentralized Championship.
- 1985: Champion of the 1985 Decentralized Championship - First round, 1985 Copa Libertadores.
- 1986: 9th, 1986 Decentralized Championship - First round, 1986 Copa Libertadores.
- 1987: Champion of the 1987 Decentralized Championship.
- 1988: 2nd, 1988 Decentralized Championship - Round of 16, 1988 Copa Libertadores.
- 1989: 3rd, 1989 Decentralized Championship - Round of 16, 1989 Copa Libertadores.
- 1990: Champion of the 1990 Decentralized Championship.
- 1991: 3rd, 1991 Decentralized Championship - Round of 16, 1991 Copa Libertadores.
- 1992: Champion of the 1992 Decentralized Championship - First round, 1992 Copa Conmebol.
- 1993: Champion of the 1993 Decentralized Championship - Round of 16, 1993 Copa Libertadores.
- 1994: 5th, 1994 Decentralized Championship - Round of 16, 1994 Copa Libertadores.
- 1995: 2nd, 1995 Decentralized Championship.
- 1996: 3rd, 1996 Decentralized Championship - First round, 1996 Copa Libertadores.
- 1997: 3rd, 1997 Decentralized Championship - Semifinal, 1997 Copa Conmebol.
- 1998: Champion of the 1998 Decentralized Championship - First round, 1998 Copa Merconorte.
- 1999: Champion of the 1999 Decentralized Championship - Round of 16, 1999 Copa Libertadores - First round, 1999 Copa Merconorte.
- 2000: Champion of the 2000 Decentralized Championship - First round, 2000 Copa Libertadores - First round, 2000 Copa Merconorte - Inauguration of the Estadio Monumental.
- 2001: 8th, 2001 Decentralized Championship - First round, 2001 Copa Libertadores - First round, 2001 Copa Merconorte.
- 2002: 2nd, 2002 Decentralized Championship - First round, 2002 Copa Sudamericana.
- 2003: 9th, 2003 Decentralized Championship - First round, 2003 Copa Libertadores.
- 2004: 5th, 2004 Decentralized Championship.
- 2005: 3rd, 2005 Decentralized Championship - First round, 2005 Copa Sudamericana.
- 2006: 5th, 2006 Decentralized Championship - Second round, 2006 Copa Libertadores.
- 2007: 4th, 2007 Decentralized Championship - First round, 2006 Copa Sudamericana.
- 2008: 2nd, 2008 Decentralized Championship - Universitario de Deportes invited to FIFA's Working Group for Clubs.
- 2009: Champion of the 2009 Decentralized Championship - Second round, 2009 Copa Libertadores.
- 2010: 4th, 2010 Decentralized Championship - Round of 16, 2010 Copa Libertadores.
- 2011: 14th, 2011 Decentralized Championship - Round of 16, Torneo Intermedio - Champion, u-20 Copa Libertadores - Quarterfinal, 2011 Copa Sudamericana.
- 2012: 11th, 2012 Decentralized Championship.
- 2013: Champion of the 2013 Decentralized Championship.
- 2014: 6th, 2014 Decentralized Championship - 12th, 2014 Torneo del Inca - Second round, 2014 Copa Libertadores.
- 2015: 7th, 2015 Decentralized Championship - 12th, 2015 Torneo del Inca - Second round, 2015 Copa Sudamericana.
- 2016: 3rd, 2016 Decentralized Championship - First round, 2016 Copa Sudamericana.
- 2017: 4th, 2017 Decentralized Championship - Second round, 2017 Copa Libertadores.
- 2018: 9th, 2018 Decentralized Championship - First round, 2018 Copa Libertadores.
- 2019: 4th, 2019 Liga1 - Quarterfinal, 2019 Copa Bicentenario.
- 2020: 2nd, 2020 Liga1 - Second round, 2020 Copa Libertadores.
- 2021: 3rd, 2021 Liga1 - Round of 32, 2021 Copa Bicentenario - Group stage, 2021 Copa Libertadores.
- 2022: 5th, 2022 Liga1 - Second round, 2022 Copa Libertadores.
- 2023: Champion of the 2023 Liga1 - Round of 16 play-off, 2023 Copa Sudamericana.
- 2024: Champion of the 2024 Liga1 - Group stage, 2024 Copa Libertadores.
- 2025: Champion of the 2025 Liga1 - Round of 16, 2025 Copa Libertadores.
- 2026: Group stage, 2026 Copa Libertadores.

== See also ==
- List of Club Universitario de Deportes players
- Club Universitario de Deportes in South American football
- Club Universitario de Deportes–Sporting Cristal rivalry
- Peruvian Clásico
- Iluminados
