= Jorge Góngora =

Peruvian footballer (1906-1999)

Personal information
- Full name: Jorge Góngora Montalván
- Date of birth: 23 March 1910
- Place of birth: Abancay, Peru
- Date of death: 24 June 1999 (aged 92)
- Place of death: Lima, Peru
- Position: Striker

Senior career*
Years	Team	Apps	(Gls)
1926–1927	Sportivo Jorge Chávez		
1928–1931	Universitario		
1932	Audax Italiano		
1933–1937	Unión Española		
1938–1939	Universidad de Chile	10	(4)

International career
- Peru
- * Club domestic league appearances and goals

Jorge Góngora Montalván (March 19, 1910, in Abancay, Peru – June 25, 1999, in Lima, Peru) was a Peruvian footballer who played as a striker.

== Career ==
Góngora played for clubs in his homeland and Chile. He played for Sportivo Jorge Chávez and Universitario de Deportes in Peru.

In Chile, Góngora played for Audax Italiano, Unión Española and in Chile and Universidad de Chile.

At international level, he represented the Peru national football team in the FIFA World Cup Uruguay 1930.
