= Eduardo Astengo =

Peruvian footballer (1909-1979)

Personal information
- Full name: Eduardo Virgilio Astengo Campodónico
- Date of birth: 26 June 1909
- Place of birth: Lima, Peru
- Date of death: 10 September 1979 (aged 70)
- Place of death: Lima, Peru
- Height: 1.80 m (5 ft 11 in)
- Position: Midfielder

Senior career*
Years	Team	Apps	(Gls)
1929–1931	Universitario		

International career
1930	Peru	1	(0)
- * Club domestic league appearances and goals

Eduardo Virgilio Astengo Campodónico (26 June 1909 – 10 September 1979) was a Peruvian footballer who played as a midfielder.

== Career ==
Astengo's career in club football was spent with Universitario de Deportes. He made one appearance for the Peru national teamat the FIFA World Cup 1930 against.

== Honours ==
Universitario de Deportes

- Peruvian First Division: 1929
