= José Luis Carranza =

Peruvian footballer (born 1964)

Personal information
- Full name: José Luis Carranza Vivanco
- Date of birth: 8 January 1964 (age 62)
- Place of birth: Lima, Peru
- Height: 1.75 m (5 ft 9 in)
- Position: Midfielder

Senior career*
Years	Team	Apps	(Gls)
1985–2004	Universitario de Deportes	570	(8)

International career
1988–1997	Peru	55	(1)
- * Club domestic league appearances and goals as of 25 January 2007

José Luis Carranza Vivanco (born 8 January 1964) is a former footballer who played as a midfielder for his entire club career at Universitario de Deportes. Carranza also played for the Peru national football team, making 55 appearances from 1988 to 1997.

== Biography ==
He made his professional debut with Universitario on 13 May 1986 in Bolivia against Club Bolívar. Carranza would remain with the club during his 19 years as a professional footballer.

Carranza won the Peruvian league titles of 1985, 1987, 1990, 1992, 1993, 1998, 1999 and 2000. He is the player who has played the most Peruvian football derbies against traditional rivals Alianza Lima. His number 22 has been retired by the club.

He played 10 Copa Libertadores. With 51 games in the Copa, Carranza surpassed Hector Chumpitaz, another symbol of Universitario, in number of games played in this competition for the club. In addition, Carranza played in 3 Copa América and 3 World Cup qualification tournaments. He obtained 55 international caps for the Peru national football team and scored one goal. He played his first international match for Peru on September 21, 1988, in a friendly match against Paraguay (0-1), and his last for Peru was on November 16, 1997, in a World Cup qualifier match against Paraguay (1-0).

His last game as a professional was played on 26 December 2004, where he scored one goal. His testimonial match took place on 6 April 2005 and was attended by renowned South American players. Several times during his career he rejected offers from teams in Argentina, Ecuador, and Spain to stay at the club he supported and became a symbol of Universitario. After retirement, Carranza studied to become a coach, opened a youth football academy and ran a popular cebicheria (sea food restaurant).

He unsuccessfully ran for mayor of the Comas District, Lima, promising “me, water and sewerage” and “fubo’ team”.

== Club ==
- Universitario de Deportes (1985–2004)

== See also ==
- One-club man
