= Carlos Cillóniz =

Peruvian footballer (1910-1972)

Personal information
- Full name: Carlos Cillóniz Oberti
- Date of birth: July 1, 1910
- Place of birth: Ica, Peru
- Date of death: 24 October 1972 (aged 62)
- Place of death: Lima
- Position: Midfielder

Senior career*
Years	Team	Apps	(Gls)
1930	Universitario de Deportes		

International career
1930	Peru	0	(0)
- * Club domestic league appearances and goals

Carlos Cillóniz Oberti (1 July 1910 – 24 October 1972) was a Peruvian football forward. He was also Universitario de Deportes' ninth president.

== Career ==
His career in club football was spent in Universitario de Deportes. He played for the Peru national football team in the 1930 FIFA World Cup.
