= Gustavo Grondona =

Argentine footballer

Personal information
- Full name: Gustavo Héctor Grondona Maio
- Date of birth: June 16, 1968 (age 58)
- Place of birth: Buenos Aires, Argentina
- Height: 1.74 m (5 ft 9 in)
- Position: Midfielder

Senior career*
Years	Team	Apps	(Gls)
1989–1990	Arsenal de Sarandí	-	
1991–1992	Independiente	19	(3)
1992–1993	Huracán	11	(0)
1995–1998	Deportivo Español	66	(8)
1998–2001	Universitario de Deportes	129	(25)
2001	Sporting Cristal	-	
2002–2003	Arsenal de Sarandí	30	(3)
- * Club domestic league appearances and goals as of July 2007

Gustavo Grondona (born 16 June 1968 in Buenos Aires) is an Argentinian former professional footballer who played as a midfielder. He is currently the assistant manager of Colo Colo football club from Chile.

Gustavo Grondona is the son of Héctor Grodona, brother of Julio Humberto Grondona. He made his playing debut in 1989 for the club founded by his father, Arsenal de Sarandí.

Unlike his father Gustavo managed to step up to play at the highest level, appearing in the Argentine Primera División for Independiente, Huracán and Deportivo Español in the 1990s.

In 1998, he joined Peruvian club Universitario de Deportes where he was part of three championship winning squads between 1998 and 2000.

After a short spell with Sporting Cristal in 2001, he returned to Argentina to play out his career with Arsenal during their first ever season in the Argentine Primera.

== Titles ==
- Primera División Peruana 1998
- Primera División Peruana 1999
- Primera División Peruana 2000
