= 2012 Copa Federación =

José Gálvez	Juan Aurich
1	0
- Date: September 9, 2012
- Venue: Estadio Manuel Rivera Sanchez, Chimbote
- Referee: Georges Buckley

The 2012 Copa Federación was the 1st Peruvian football championship contested by the winners of Primera División and the Copa Inca. The match was originally scheduled to take place on August 1, 2012, but was postponed by the Peruvian Federation due to overscheduling. The match took place on September 9, 2012.

José Gálvez were crowned champions after defeating Juan Aurich 1–0, winning their second official title after previously claiming the 2011 Torneo Intermedio.

== Qualified teams ==
Team	Qualification
Juan Aurich	2011 Primera División champion
José Gálvez	2011 Copa Inca champion

== Match details ==
September 9, 2012
16:00

José Gálvez	1–0	Juan Aurich
Junior Aliberti 44'

Manuel Rivera Sanchez, Chimbote
Referee: Georges Buckley

José Gálvez	Juan Aurich

JOSE GALVEZ:
GK	1	(Peru) Daniel Reyes
DF	4	(Peru) Andrés Salinas	(yellow card) 64'
DF	5	(Peru) Paulo Ramos
DF	6	(Peru) Marco Ruiz
MF	7	(Peru) Miguel Cevasco
MF	22	(Peru) Ricardo Salcedo
MF	17	(Peru) Johny Obeso
MF	19	(Peru) Jersson Vásquez
MF	8	(Argentina) Guillermo Hoyos	(substituted off) 31'
FW	25	(Peru) Carlos Barrena	(substituted off) 71'
FW	10	(Peru) César Medina	(substituted off) 86'
Substitutes:
	12	(Peru) Christian Jave
	2	(Peru) Ismael Alvarado
	27	(Peru) Diego Encinas
	15	(Peru) Josimar Atoche	(substituted on) 71'	(yellow card) 91'
	16	(Peru) Victor Carbajal
	29	(Peru) Junior Aguirre	(substituted on) 86'
	11	(Uruguay) Junior Aliberti	(substituted on) 31'
Manager:
(Peru) Javier Arce

JUAN AURICH:
GK	1	(Peru) Ignacio Drago
DF	17	(Peru) Manuel Ugaz
DF	16	(Peru) Luis Guadalupe (C)
DF	4	(Argentina) Leandro Fleitas
DF	8	(Peru) Nelinho Quina	(substituted off) 46'
MF	23	(Peru) Jorge Molina	(red card) 78'
MF	14	(Peru) John Jairo Valencia
MF	15	(Peru) Israel Kahn
MF	10	(Peru) Javier Araujo	(substituted off) 58'
FW	24	(Peru) Osnar Noronha	(substituted off) 75'
FW	29	(Peru) Mauricio Montes
Substitutes:
	21	(Peru) Paul Pantoja
	5	(Peru) Orlando Contreras
	6	(Peru) Alfredo Rojas
	13	(Peru) Diego Minaya
	20	(Peru) Julio Caicedo	(substituted on) 58'
	27	(Peru) Luis Trujillo	(substituted on) 46'
	30	(Peru) Anderson Cueto	(substituted on) 75'
Manager:
(Peru) Franco Navarro
