= 2013 Alianza Lima season =

Alianza Lima
2013 season
- President: Susana Cuba
- Manager: Wilmar Valencia
- Stadium: Matute, Lima
- Torneo Descentralizado: 4th
Home colours	Away colours	Third colours

The 2013 season is Alianza Lima's 112th in existence and the club's 96th season in the top flight of Peruvian football. The season marks the return of manager Wilmar Valencia, who assumed management of the club first in 2005.

== Players ==
=== Squad information ===
As of 6 Feb 2013

Note: Flags indicate national team as defined under FIFA eligibility rules; some limited exceptions apply. Players may hold more than one non-FIFA nationality.

No.	Pos.	Nation	Player
1	GK	PER	George Forsyth
2	DF	PER	Erick Sánchez
3	DF	PER	Edgar Villamarín
4	DF	PER	Koichi Aparicio
5	DF	PER	José Canova
6	MF	ARG	Emiliano Ciucci
7	MF	PER	Paulo Albarracín
9	FW	PER	Miguel Mostto
10	MF	PER	Jorge Bazán
11	MF	PER	Henry Quinteros (captain)
12	GK	PER	Manuel Heredia
13	MF	ARG	Carlos Beltrán
14	DF	PER	Carlos García

No.	Pos.	Nation	Player
15	FW	PER	Wilmer Aguirre
17	MF	PER	Wilder Cartagena
18	FW	PER	Jhonny Vidales
20	MF	PER	Anderson Cueto
21	GK	PER	Angelo Campos
22	MF	PER	César Mayurí
23	DF	URU	Walter Ibáñez
24	MF	PER	Julio Edson Uribe
26	FW	PER	Yordy Reyna
27	DF	PER	Luis Trujillo
28	MF	PER	Gino Guerrero
29	MF	PER	Sergio Peña
30	DF	PER	Rodrigo Cuba

=== Transfers ===
==== In ====
Date	Pos.	Player	Age	Moving from	Fee	Notes
1 January 2013	GK	(Peru) Manuel Heredia	26	(Peru) Cienciano	Free	
1 January 2013	MF	(Peru) Julio Edson Uribe	27	(Peru) Real Garcilaso	Free	
1 January 2013	MF	(Argentina) Emiliano Ciucci	26	(Peru) Real Garcilaso	Free	
1 January 2013	DF	(Peru) Luis Trujillo	22	(Peru) Juan Aurich	Free	
1 January 2013	DF	(Peru) Erick Sánchez	19	(Peru) Atlético Minero	Free	
1 January 2013	MF	(Peru) Anderson Cueto	23	(Peru) Juan Aurich	Free	
1 January 2013	MF	(Peru) Renatto Chira	20	(Peru) Real Garcilaso	Free	
3 February 2013	FW	(Peru) Wilmer Aguirre	29	(Mexico) San Luis FC	Free	

==== Out ====
Date	Pos.	Player	Age	Moving to	Fee	Notes
19 November 2012	MF	(Peru) Juan José Jayo	39	Retired	Free	
14 December 2012	GK	(Peru) Salomón Libman	28	(Peru) Univ. César Vallejo	Free	
28 December 2012	MF	(Peru) Junior Ponce	18	(Germany) Hoffenheim		
1 January 2013	DF	(Peru) Diego Donayre	21	Released	Free	
1 January 2013	MF	(Peru) Saúl Anicama	21	(Peru) Inti Gas	Loan	
1 January 2013	MF	(Peru) Junior Viza	27	(Peru) Juan Aurich	Free	
1 January 2013	GK	(Peru) Ángel Azurín	21	(Peru) Unión Comercio	Free	
1 January 2013	GK	(Colombia) Jorge Rivera	34	(Peru) León de Huánuco	Free	
1 January 2013	MF	(Peru) Donny Neyra	28	(Peru) UTC	Free	

|}

- Last updated: 14 April 2013

== Competitions ==
=== Torneo Descentralizado ===
==== First stage ====
Pos	Team	Pld	W	D	L	GF	GA	GD	Pts	Second Stage placement
6	León de Huánuco	30	11	12	7	37	27	+10	45	
7	Alianza Lima	30	13	6	11	34	33	+1	45	Liguilla A
8	Inti Gas	30	11	10	9	41	38	+3	43	

===== Results =====
Home \ Away	ALI	CIE	MEL	IGD	JG	JA	LEÓ	PAC	RGA	CRI	SHU	UCO	UCV	USM	UTC	UNI
Alianza Lima		0–1	1–0	1–4	1–0	3–1	2–1	0–0	1–0	1–0	1–0	1–1	0–1	2–3	1–0	1–0
Cienciano	2–1															
Melgar	0–2															
Inti Gas	3–1															
José Gálvez	2–2															
Juan Aurich	0–1															
León de Huánuco	2–2															
Pacífico	1–2															
Real Garcilaso	0–0															
Sporting Cristal	2–2															
Sport Huancayo	3–2															
Unión Comercio	2–1															
Universidad César Vallejo	1–0															
Universidad San Martín	1–0															
UTC	1–2															
Universitario	1–0															

Updated to match(es) played on June 24, 2013. Source: ADFP.org.pe
Legend: Blue = home team win; Yellow = draw; Red = away team win.

==== Second stage ====
Liguilla A
Pos	Team	Pld	W	D	L	GF	GA	GD	Pts
2	Sporting Cristal	44	22	9	13	76	45	+31	75
3	Alianza Lima	44	19	12	13	57	46	+11	70
4	Universidad César Vallejo	44	18	15	11	56	46	+10	69

===== Results =====
Home \ Away	ALI	MEL	PAC	RGA	CRI	SHU	UCV	UCO
Alianza Lima		2–0	3–0	2–1	0–0	1–1	1–1	3–0
Melgar	1–1							
Pacífico	1–5							
Real Garcilaso	2–2							
Sporting Cristal	1–0							
Sport Huancayo	1–1							
Universidad César Vallejo	3–0							
Unión Comercio	1–2							

Updated to match(es) played on September 2013. Source: ADFP.org.pe
Legend: Blue = home team win; Yellow = draw; Red = away team win.
