= 2011 U-20 Copa Libertadores =

Copa Libertadores Sub-20 Futuro de América

Tournament details
- Host country: Peru
- Dates: 10 – 26 June
- Teams: 12 (from 11 confederations)
- Venue: 2 (in 1 host city)

Final positions
- Champions: (Peru) Universitario (1st title)
- Runners-up: (Argentina) Boca Juniors
- Third place: (Mexico) América

Tournament statistics
- Matches played: 23
- Goals scored: 43 (1.87 per match)
- Top scorer(s): (Peru) Cristofer Soto (Argentina) Sergio Unrein (4 goals each)
- Best player: (Peru) Edison Flores

The 2011 U-20 Copa Libertadores (known as the 2011 Copa Movistar Libertadores Sub-20 for sponsorship reasons) was the first edition of this U-20 club competition. Players born on or after 1 January 1990 were eligible to compete. The tournament was originally going to be hosted in November 2010, however, because of the postponement, players born in 1990 were allowed to play, otherwise only players born after 1 January 1991 would have been eligible.

== Venues ==
All games were played in Lima at the Estadio Monumental and Estadio Alejandro Villanueva.

| Lima | 2011 U-20 Copa Libertadores is located in Peru |
|---|---|
| Estadio Monumental | 2011 U-20 Copa Libertadores is located in Peru |
| Capacity: 80,093 | 2011 U-20 Copa Libertadores is located in Peru |
| Lima | 2011 U-20 Copa Libertadores is located in Peru |
| Estadio Alejandro Villanueva | 2011 U-20 Copa Libertadores is located in Peru |
| Capacity: 35,000 | 2011 U-20 Copa Libertadores is located in Peru |

== Qualification ==
In addition to the two clubs of the host nation, nine clubs qualified from the remaining nine football associations of CONMEBOL and one from the Mexican Football Federation.

| (Argentina) Boca Juniors | Invitee |
| (Bolivia) Jorge Wilstermann | 2011 U-20 Torneo Classificatorio champion |
| (Brazil) Flamengo | 2011 U-18 Copa São Paulo champion |
| (Chile) Universidad Católica | 2010 U-18 National champion |
| (Colombia) Millonarios | 2010 U-19 Torneo Postobón champion |
| (Ecuador) Independiente del Valle | 2010 U-18 Serie A champion |
| (Mexico) América | 2010 U-20 Torneo Apertura champion |
| (Paraguay) Libertad | 2010 U-20 National champion |
| (Peru) Universitario | 2010 U-18 Copa Federación champion |
| (Peru) Alianza Lima | 2010 U-18 Copa Federación runners-up |
| (Uruguay) Nacional | U-19 Annual champion |
| (Venezuela) Caracas | 2010 U-20 Torneo Venezolano champion |

== Group stage ==
The winners and runners-up from each group, as well as the best two third-placed teams, advanced the quarterfinals.

Key to colors in group tables
| Group winners, runners-up, and best two third-placed teams advance to the quarterfinals |

All kick-off times are local (UTC−05:00).

=== Group A ===
| Pos | Team | Pld | W | D | L | GF | GA | GD | Pts |
|---|---|---|---|---|---|---|---|---|---|
| 1 | (Uruguay) Nacional | 3 | 2 | 1 | 0 | 4 | 1 | +3 | 7 |
| 2 | (Peru) Universitario | 3 | 1 | 1 | 1 | 2 | 4 | −2 | 4 |
| 3 | (Paraguay) Libertad | 3 | 1 | 0 | 2 | 4 | 3 | +1 | 3 |
| 4 | (Bolivia) Jorge Wilstermann | 3 | 1 | 0 | 2 | 2 | 4 | −2 | 3 |

10 June 2011
18:00

| Nacional (Uruguay) | 1–0 | (Paraguay) Libertad |
|---|---|---|
| Romero 16' |

Estadio Monumental, Lima
Referee: Patricio Loustau (Argentina)

10 June 2011
20:10

| Universitario (Peru) | 1–0 | (Bolivia) Jorge Wilstermann |
|---|---|---|
| Polo 58' |

Estadio Monumental, Lima
Referee: Patricio Polic (Chile)

13 June 2011
18:00

| Jorge Wilstermann (Bolivia) | 1–3 | (Uruguay) Nacional |
|---|---|---|
| Taboada 75' | | Bueno 39'; Marchelli 49' (pen.); Romero 53' |

Estadio Monumental, Lima
Referee: Leandro Vuaden (Brazil)

13 June 2011
20:10

| Universitario (Peru) | 1–4 | (Paraguay) Libertad |
|---|---|---|
| Polo 31' | | Caballero 16' 64'; Ruiz 80' 90+4' |

Estadio Monumental, Lima
Referee: Alfredo Intriago (Ecuador)

16 June 2011
18:00

| Jorge Wilstermann (Bolivia) | 1–0 | (Paraguay) Libertad |
|---|---|---|
| Rios 79' |

Estadio Monumental, Lima
Referee: Patricio Polic (Chile)

16 June 2011
20:10

| Universitario (Peru) | 0–0 | (Uruguay) Nacional |

Estadio Monumental, Lima
Referee: Leandro Vuaden (Brazil)

=== Group B ===
| Pos | Team | Pld | W | D | L | GF | GA | GD | Pts |
|---|---|---|---|---|---|---|---|---|---|
| 1 | (Argentina) Boca Juniors | 3 | 2 | 1 | 0 | 7 | 2 | +5 | 7 |
| 2 | (Peru) Alianza Lima | 3 | 2 | 0 | 1 | 7 | 5 | +2 | 6 |
| 3 | (Chile) Universidad Católica | 3 | 1 | 0 | 2 | 4 | 8 | −4 | 3 |
| 4 | (Venezuela) Caracas | 3 | 0 | 1 | 2 | 2 | 5 | −3 | 1 |

11 June 2011
16:00

| Boca Juniors (Argentina) | 3–1 | (Chile) Universidad Católica |
|---|---|---|
| Unrein 1'; Echevarría 20'; Unrein 46' | | Manzano 77' |

Estadio Alejandro Villanueva, Lima
Referee: Alfredo Intriago (Ecuador)

11 June 2011
18:10

| Alianza Lima (Peru) | 2–1 | (Venezuela) Caracas |
|---|---|---|
| Hurtado 54'; Bazán 90+2' | | Martínez 69' |

Estadio Alejandro Villanueva, Lima
Referee: Leandro Vuaden (Brazil)

14 June 2011
18:00

| Boca Juniors (Argentina) | 0–0 | (Venezuela) Caracas |

Estadio Alejandro Villanueva, Lima
Referee: Patricio Polic (Chile)

14 June 2011
20:10

| Alianza Lima (Peru) | 4–0 | (Chile) Universidad Católica |
|---|---|---|
| Hurtado 24'; Soto 45' 64'; Ascues 56' |

Estadio Alejandro Villanueva, Lima
Referee: Patricio Loustau (Argentina)

17 June 2011
18:00

| Universidad Católica (Chile) | 3–1 | (Venezuela) Caracas |
|---|---|---|
| Villalobos 40'; Peña 65' 81' (pen.) | | Terán 55' |

Estadio Alejandro Villanueva, Lima
Referee: Manuel Garay (Peru)

17 June 2011
20:10

| Alianza Lima (Peru) | 1–4 | (Argentina) Boca Juniors |
|---|---|---|
| Trujillo 77' | | Orfano 36'; Fragapane 67'; Flores 84'; Imbert 87' |

Estadio Alejandro Villanueva, Lima
Referee: Alfredo Intriago (Ecuador)

=== Group C ===
| Pos | Team | Pld | W | D | L | GF | GA | GD | Pts |
|---|---|---|---|---|---|---|---|---|---|
| 1 | (Brazil) Flamengo | 3 | 1 | 2 | 0 | 4 | 2 | +2 | 5 |
| 2 | (Ecuador) Independiente del Valle | 3 | 1 | 1 | 1 | 4 | 4 | 0 | 4 |
| 3 | (Mexico) América | 3 | 1 | 1 | 1 | 4 | 5 | −1 | 4 |
| 4 | (Colombia) Millonarios | 3 | 0 | 2 | 1 | 2 | 3 | −1 | 2 |

12 June 2011
16:00

| Flamengo (Brazil) | 2–2 | (Ecuador) Independiente del Valle |
|---|---|---|
| Nixson 12'; Rafinha 51' | | Asprilla 62'; Quiñónez 77' |

Estadio Alejandro Villanueva, Lima
Referee: Manuel Garay (Peru)

12 June 2011
18:10

| América (Mexico) | 2–2 | (Colombia) Millonarios |
|---|---|---|
| Olascoaga 12'; Jiménez 51' | | Alarcón 26'; Alarcón 73' |

Estadio Alejandro Villanueva, Lima
Referee: Henry Gambetta (Peru)

15 June 2011
18:00

| América (Mexico) | 2–1 | (Ecuador) Independiente del Valle |
|---|---|---|
| León y Vélez 38'; Jiménez 52' | | Ayoví 63' |

Estadio Monumental, Lima
Referee: Georges Buckley (Peru)

15 June 2011
20:10

| Flamengo (Brazil) | 0–0 | (Colombia) Millonarios |

Estadio Monumental, Lima
Referee: Victor Hugo Rivera (Peru)

18 June 2011
16:00

| Independiente del Valle (Ecuador) | 1–0 | (Colombia) Millonarios |
|---|---|---|
| Ordóñez 67' |

Estadio Alejandro Villanueva, Lima
Referee: Victor Hugo Rivera (Peru)

18 June 2011
18:10

| Flamengo (Brazil) | 2–0 | (Mexico) América |
|---|---|---|
| Dias 3'; Nixson 30' |

Estadio Alejandro Villanueva, Lima
Referee: Henry Gambetta (Peru)

=== Ranking of third-placed teams ===
| Pos | Grp | Team | Pld | W | D | L | GF | GA | GD | Pts |
|---|---|---|---|---|---|---|---|---|---|---|
| 1 | C | (Mexico) América | 3 | 1 | 1 | 1 | 4 | 5 | −1 | 4 |
| 2 | A | (Paraguay) Libertad | 3 | 1 | 0 | 2 | 4 | 4 | 0 | 3 |
| 3 | B | (Chile) Universidad Católica | 3 | 1 | 0 | 2 | 4 | 8 | −4 | 3 |

== Knockout phase ==
Quarterfinals
20 June – Lima
(Uruguay) Nacional | 0
(Mexico) América | 1
20 June – Lima
(Argentina) Boca Juniors | 2
(Paraguay) Libertad | 1
21 June – Lima
(Peru) Universitario | 3
(Ecuador) Independiente del Valle | 0
21 June – Lima
(Brazil) Flamengo | 1
(Peru) Alianza Lima | 5

Semifinals
22 June – Lima
(Mexico) América | 0
(Argentina) Boca Juniors | 1
23 June – Lima
(Peru) Universitario | 0 (5)
(Peru) Alianza Lima | 0 (4)

Final
26 June – Lima
(Argentina) Boca Juniors | 1 (2)
(Peru) Universitario | 1 (4)
Third place
25 June – Lima
(Mexico) América | 1
(Peru) Alianza Lima | 0

=== Quarterfinals ===
20 June 2011
18:00

| Nacional (Uruguay) | 0–1 | (Mexico) América |
|---|---|---|
| | | Doncel 57' |

Estadio Monumental, Lima
Referee: Manuel Garay (Peru)

20 June 2011
20:20

| Boca Juniors (Argentina) | 2–1 | (Paraguay) Libertad |
|---|---|---|
| Unrein 50'; Unrein 75' | | Caballero 45' |

Estadio Monumental, Lima
Referee: Georges Buckley (Peru)

21 June 2011
15:00

| Universitario (Peru) | 3–0 | (Ecuador) Independiente del Valle |
|---|---|---|
| La Torre 84'; Polo 85'; Mimbela 88' |

Estadio Monumental, Lima
Referee: Patricio Loustau (Argentina)

21 June 2011
20:00

| Flamengo (Brazil) | 1–5 | (Peru) Alianza Lima |
|---|---|---|
| Rafinha 20'; Víctor (red card) 35'; César (red card) 60' | | Soto 33' 72'; Portugal 60'; Reyna 82'; Olascuaga 89' |

Estadio Alejandro Villanueva, Lima
Referee: Patricio Pollit (Chile)

=== Semifinals ===
22 June 2011
20:00

| América (Mexico) | 0–1 | (Argentina) Boca Juniors |
|---|---|---|
| | | Imbert 43' |

Estadio Alejandro Villanueva, Lima
Referee: Henry Gambetta (Peru)

23 June 2011
20:00

| Universitario (Peru) | 0–0 | (Peru) Alianza Lima |
Penalties
| Franco (penalty scored); Ampuero (penalty scored); Polo (penalty missed); López (penalty scored); La Torre (penalty scored); Romero (penalty scored) | 5–4 | (penalty missed) Hurtado; (penalty scored) Soto; (penalty scored) Trujillo; (penalty scored) Ascues; (penalty scored) Hinostroza; (penalty missed) Bazán |

Estadio Monumental, Lima
Attendance: 40,000
Referee: Alfredo Intriago (Ecuador)

=== Third-place match ===
25 June 2011
16:00

| América (Mexico) | 1–0 | (Peru) Alianza Lima |
|---|---|---|
| Jiménez 82' |

Estadio Alejandro Villanueva, Lima
Referee: Patricio Loustau (Argentina)

=== Final ===
26 June 2011
16:00

| Boca Juniors (Argentina) | 1–1 | (Peru) Universitario |
|---|---|---|
| Rossi 48' | | Ampuero 24' |
Penalties
| Unrein (penalty missed); Imbert (penalty scored); Achucarro (penalty missed); Flores (penalty scored) | 2–4 | (penalty scored) Franco; (penalty scored) Mimbela; (penalty scored) Romero; (penalty scored) López |

Estadio Monumental, Lima
Attendance: 50,000
Referee: Leandro Vuaden (Brazil)

== Final standings ==
| Pos | Team | Pld | W | D | L | GF | GA | GD | Pts |
|---|---|---|---|---|---|---|---|---|---|
| 1 | (Peru) Universitario | 6 | 2 | 3 | 1 | 6 | 5 | +1 | 9 |
| 2 | (Argentina) Boca Juniors | 6 | 4 | 2 | 0 | 11 | 4 | +7 | 14 |
| 3 | (Mexico) América | 6 | 3 | 1 | 2 | 6 | 6 | 0 | 10 |
| 4 | (Peru) Alianza Lima | 6 | 3 | 1 | 2 | 12 | 7 | +5 | 10 |
| 5 | (Uruguay) Nacional | 4 | 2 | 1 | 1 | 4 | 2 | +2 | 7 |
| 6 | (Brazil) Flamengo | 4 | 1 | 2 | 1 | 5 | 7 | −2 | 5 |
| 7 | (Ecuador) Independiente del Valle | 4 | 1 | 1 | 2 | 4 | 7 | −3 | 4 |
| 8 | (Paraguay) Libertad | 4 | 1 | 0 | 3 | 5 | 5 | 0 | 3 |
| 9 | (Bolivia) Jorge Wilstermann | 3 | 1 | 0 | 2 | 2 | 4 | −2 | 3 |
| 10 | (Chile) Universidad Católica | 3 | 1 | 0 | 2 | 4 | 8 | −4 | 3 |
| 11 | (Colombia) Millonarios | 3 | 0 | 2 | 1 | 2 | 3 | −1 | 2 |
| 12 | (Venezuela) Caracas | 3 | 0 | 1 | 2 | 2 | 5 | −3 | 1 |

== Goalscorers ==
4 goals

- (Peru) Cristofer Soto (Alianza Lima)
- (Argentina) Sergio Unrein (Boca Juniors)

3 goals

- (Peru) Andy Polo (Universitario)
- (Argentina) Juan Imbert (Boca Juniors)
- (Paraguay) Mauro Andrés Caballero (Libertad)

2 goals

- (Peru) Paolo Hurtado (Alianza Lima)
- (Mexico) Raúl Jiménez (América)
- (Brazil) Nixson (Flamengo)
- (Brazil) Rafinha (Flamengo)
- (Uruguay) Santiago Romero (Nacional)
- (Colombia) Cristhian Alarcón (Millonarios)
- (Paraguay) Oscar Ruiz (Libertad)
- (Chile) Camilo Peña (Universidad Católica)

1 goal

- (Argentina) Santiago Echevarría (Boca Juniors)
- (Bolivia) Daniel Taboada (Jorge Wilstermann)
- (Bolivia) Darwin Ríos (Jorge Wilstermann)
- (Chile) Fabián Manzano (Universidad Católica)
- (Chile) Jesús Villalobos (Universidad Católica)
- (Ecuador) Jose Ayovi (Independiente del Valle)
- (Ecuador) Edison Quiñónez (Independiente del Valle)
- (Ecuador) Gustavo Asprilla (Independiente del Valle)
- (Mexico) Luis Olascoaga (América)
- (Mexico) Jorge León y Vélez Méndez (América)
- (Peru) Carlos Ascues (Alianza Lima)
- (Peru) Jorge Bazán (Alianza Lima)
- (Peru) Carlos Olascuaga (Alianza Lima)
- (Peru) Luis Trujillo (Alianza Lima)
- (Peru) Álvaro Ampuero (Universitario)
- (Peru) Christian La Torre (Universitario)
- (Peru) Willyan Mimbela (Universitario)
- (Uruguay) Gonzalo Bueno (Nacional)
- (Uruguay) Bruno Marchelli (Nacional)
- (Venezuela) Josef Martínez (Caracas)
- (Venezuela) Leonardo Terán (Caracas)
