= Carlos Cáceda =

Peruvian footballer (born 1991)

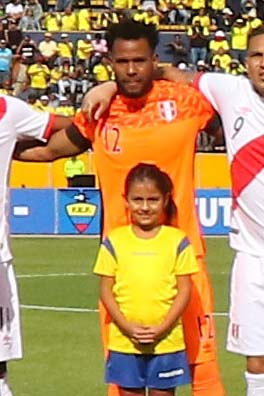
- Cáceda with Peru in 2017

Personal information
- Full name: Carlos Alberto Cáceda Ollaguez
- Date of birth: 27 September 1991 (age 35)
- Place of birth: Lima, Peru
- Height: 1.84 m (6 ft 0 in)
- Position: Goalkeeper

Team information
- Current team: Melgar
- Number: 12

Senior career*
Years	Team	Apps	(Gls)
2008	Alianza Atlético	1	(0)
2011–2017	Universitario	105	(0)
2018–2019	Veracruz	0	(0)
2018	→ Deportivo Municipal (loan)	12	(0)
2018	→ Real Garcilaso (loan)	4	(0)
2019–	Melgar	176	(0)

International career^{‡}
2011	Peru U20	2	(0)
2019	Peru U23	4	(0)
2016–2024	Peru	9	(0)
Medal record
Men's football
Representing Peru
Copa América
Runner-up	2019 Brazil
- * Club domestic league appearances and goals as of 30 December 2025 ‡ National team caps and goals as of 23:20, 15 November 2024 (UTC)

Carlos Alberto Cáceda Ollaguez (born 27 September 1991) is a Peruvian professional footballer who plays as a goalkeeper for Melgar. He is known as a secured goal-stopper with quick reflexes and a speedy pace to rush off his line. He played all games when Universitario under-20 squad won the 2011 U-20 Copa Libertadores.

== Club career ==
Cáceda began his senior career with Alianza Atlético in 2008. He was given his Torneo Descentralizado league debut by manager Teddy Cardama in Round 14 (Apertura). Cáceda entered the match for the sent-off Jorge Rivera in 22nd minute but could not help his side avoid a 4–1 defeat at home to Coronel Bolognesi. The match was his only league appearance with the Sullana club.

Then, in January 2011, Cáceda joined Universitario de Deportes' first team. However, in his first season he mainly played in the reserves. Cáceda also featured for the Universitario U20 side that won the 2011 U-20 Copa Libertadores. He played in all the matches including the final against Boca Juniors. Later that year he made his league debut for the senior team on 5 November playing from the start in the 0–0 draw at home against Inti Gas Deportes.

== International career ==
Cáceda represented the Peru U-20 squad at the 2011 South American U-20 Championship.

In November 2012, Cáceda received his first call to join the Peru national team led by then manager Sergio Markarián. At the time, however, he did not participate in the friendly match against Honduras. His first appearance was on 28 May 2016 in a friendly game against El Salvador, in which Peru won 3–1. In May 2018, he was named in Peru's provisional 24-man squad for the 2018 FIFA World Cup in Russia. Cáceda was also part of Peru's squad at the 2019 Copa América in Brazil, in which Peru was the runner-up.

In June 2019, he was included by Nolberto Solano in Peru U-23's squad for the 2019 Pan American Games. At that time, Cáceda was 27, but each team was allowed to include a maximum of three overage players in their roster.

== Career statistics ==
=== Club ===
As of 24 August 2025

Appearances and goals by club, season and competition
Club	Season	League			National cup		Continental		Other		Total	
Club	Season	Division	Apps	Goals	Apps	Goals	Apps	Goals	Apps	Goals	Apps	Goals
Universitario	2011	Torneo Descentralizado	1	0	—		—		—		1	0
Universitario	2012	Torneo Descentralizado	20	0	—		—		—		20	0
Universitario	2013	Torneo Descentralizado	1	0	—		—		—		1	0
Universitario	2014	Torneo Descentralizado	1	0	—		—		—		1	0
Universitario	2015	Torneo Descentralizado	0	0	—		—		—		0	0
Universitario	2016	Torneo Descentralizado	38	0	—		2 (Note: Appearances in Copa Sudamericana)	0	—		40	0
Universitario	2017	Torneo Descentralizado	40	0	—		2 (Note: Appearances in Copa Libertadores)	0	—		42	0
Universitario	Total		101	0	—		4	0	—		105	0
Veracruz	2018-19	Liga MX	0	0	0	0	—		—		0	0
Deportivo Municipal (loan)	2018	Torneo Descentralizado	12	0	—		—		—		12	0
Real Garcilaso (loan)	2018	Torneo Descentralizado	4	0	—		—		—		4	0
Melgar	2019	Liga 1	15	0	1 (Note: Appearances in Copa Bicentenario)	0	12 (Note: 10 appearances in Copa Libertadores and 2 appearances in Copa Sudamericana)	0	—		28	0
Melgar	2020	Liga 1	18	0	—		4	0	—		22	0
Melgar	2021	Liga 1	23	0	0	0	8	0	—		31	0
Melgar	2022	Liga 1	32	0	—		13	0	4	0	49	0
Melgar	2023	Liga 1	29	0	—		5	0	—		34	0
Melgar	2024	Liga 1	31	0	—		2	0	—		33	0
Melgar	2025	Liga 1	18	0	—		8 (Note: Four appearances in Copa Libertadores and Copa Sudamericana)	0	—		26	0
Melgar	Total		166	0	1	0	52	0	4	0	223	0
Career total			283	0	1	0	56	0	4	0	343	0

=== International ===
As of match played on 15 November 2024

Appearances and goals by national team and year
National team	Year	Apps	Goals
Peru	2016	1	0
Peru	2017	3	0
Peru	2018	2	0
Peru	2019	0	0
Peru	2020	0	0
Peru	2021	0	0
Peru	2022	1	0
Peru	2023	0	0
Peru	2024	2	0
Total		9	0

== Honours ==
Universitario de Deportes

- Torneo Apertura: 2016
- Torneo Descentralizado: 2013
- U-20 Copa Libertadores: 2011

FBC Melgar

- Torneo Apertura 2022

Peru

- Copa América runner-up: 2019

Individual

- Peruvian Primera División Goalkeeper of the Year: 2016
- Peruvian First Division Team of the Year: 2016
