= Jorge Cabrera =

Jorge Cabrera may refer to:

- Jorge Cabrera (basketball) (born 1974), Uruguayan basketball player
- Jorge Cabrera (politician), member of the Connecticut State Senate
- Jorge Castillo Cabrera (born 1946), Mexican IRP politician
- Jorge Molina Cabrera (born 1988), Peruvian midfield footballer
- Jorge Cabrera (footballer) (born 1963), Uruguayan footballer
- Jorge Cabrera (athlete) (born 1981), Paraguayan long-distance runner
