= Copa Federación de Peru =

Copa Federación
- Founded: 2012
- Region: Peru
- Teams: 2
- Most championships: José Gálvez (1 title)
- 2012 season

The Copa Federación was a Peruvian football championship to be contested by the winners of Primera División and the Copa Inca.

== History ==
Due to the 2011 Copa América, at the end of the 2011 Torneo Descentralizado's first round, the Torneo Intermedio (Copa Inca) was played, with the participation of the 16 teams of the Primera División, 5 teams of the Segunda División, and 14 teams of the Copa Perú. The winners were José Gálvez and qualified for the 2012 Copa Federación against the 2011 Torneo Descentralizado champion.

== Champions ==
- (In bracket, title count):

| Ed. | Year | Champion | Scores | Runner-up | Venue | Winning manager |
|---|---|---|---|---|---|---|
| 1 | 2012 | José Gálvez (CI) | 1–0 | Juan Aurich (PD) | Manuel Rivera Sanchez, Chimbote | (Peru) Javier Arce |

== Titles by club ==
| Club | Winners | Runners-up | Winning years | Runners-up years |
|---|---|---|---|---|
| José Gálvez | 1 | 0 | 2012 | — |
| Juan Aurich | 0 | 1 | — | 2012 |
