= Luis Mayme =

Peruvian footballer (born 1980)

Personal information
- Full name: Luis Eduardo Mayme Quijandría
- Date of birth: 28 November 1980 (age 45)
- Place of birth: Pisco, Peru
- Height: 1.83 m (6 ft 0 in)
- Position: Midfielder

Senior career*
Years	Team	Apps	(Gls)
–2004	Unión Juventud	0	(0)
2005–2006	José Gálvez	0	(0)
2007	Universitario	30	(0)
2008–2011	José Gálvez	112	(3)
2012–2013	UTC	15	(0)
2013	José Gálvez	5	(0)
2014	Carlos A. Mannucci	22	(0)
2015–2017	Comerciantes Unidos	82	(1)
- * Club domestic league appearances and goals

Luis Eduardo Mayme Quijandría (born 28 November 1980) is a Peruvian professional footballer who played as a midfielder.

== Career ==
Mayme played for José Gálvez FBC for the first time in 2005. He helped the Chimbote based club return to the top-flight by winning the 2005 Copa Perú division. The following season Mayme stayed with the newly promoted side and made more than 17 league appearances in the 2006 Torneo Descentralizado season. However, José Gálvez finished with the same points as Sport Boys and had to play in a Relegation Play-off, which his side lost 4–5 on penalties.

Then in January 2007 Mayme joined Peruvian giants Universitario de Deportes. He made his league debut for Universitario in the 2nd Round (Apertura) of the 2007 season at home to Sport Áncash. Manager Jorge Amado Nunes put him in the match in the 77th minute for Donny Neyra, and the match eventually finished in a 0–0 draw. He also later played in his first Peruvian Classico derby match away to Alianza Lima in Round 17 (Apertura). He was in the starting eleven until being substituted for Marco Ruiz in the 68th minute of the match, which finished in a 1–2 win for La U. Mayme managed to make 30 league appearances for Universitario and also one Copa Sudamericana match in the 2007 season.

In January 2008 Mayme rejoined José Gálvez FBC as the club returned to the Descentralizado for the 2008 season.

== Honours ==
José Gálvez

- Copa Perú: 2005
- Torneo Intermedio: 2011
- Segunda División Peruana: 2011
