= Josimar Atoche =

Peruvian footballer (born 1989)

Personal information
- Full name: Josimar Jair Atoche Bances
- Date of birth: 29 September 1989 (age 37)
- Place of birth: Peru
- Height: 1.78 m (5 ft 10 in)
- Position: Central midfielder

Youth career
- Cantolao

Senior career*
Years	Team	Apps	(Gls)
2008–2009	Unión Huaral		
2010–	Alianza Atlético	41	(0)
2011–2013	Juan Aurich	26	(0)
2011	→ Alianza Atlético (loan)	25	(0)
2012	→ José Gálvez (loan)	36	(1)
2014–2016	Alianza Lima	82	(1)
2017	Górnik Łęczna	9	(0)
2017	Ayacucho	13	(0)
2018–2019	Cantolao	34	(3)
2020–2021	Cusco	21	(0)
2021–2023	Carlos Stein	35	(3)
2023	Sport Boys	3	(0)
- * Club domestic league appearances and goals as of 11:52, 30 September 2024 (UTC)

Josimar Jair Atoche Bances (born 29 September 1989) is a Peruvian professional footballer who plays as a central midfielder.

== Career ==
Atoche started his career with Copa Perú side Unión Huaral in 2008.

In January 2010, he joined Alianza Atlético where he made his Torneo Descentralizado debut at home against Cienciano in the first round of the season. Manager Teddy Cardama put him in late in the game to wrap up the 2–1 win. Atoche made a total of 41 league appearances in his debut season in 2010.

In January 2011, Atoche signed for Juan Aurich, but a month later he was loaned out to his former club Alianza Atlético for the rest of the season, along with Israel Kahn.

== Honours ==
José Gálvez

- Copa Federación: 2012

Alianza Lima

- Torneo del Inca: 2014
