= Alfredo Rojas =

Alfredo Rojas may refer to:

- Alfredo Rojas (Argentine footballer) (1937–2023)
- Alfredo Rojas (Peruvian footballer) (born 1991)
