= Marco Ruiz =

Marco Ruiz may refer to:

- Marco Ruiz (golfer) (born 1974), Paraguayan golfer
- Marco Ruiz (footballer) (born 1979), Peruvian footballer
- Marco Antonio Ruiz (born 1969), retired Mexican footballer
