= Alfredo Rojas (Peruvian footballer) =

Peruvian footballer (born 1991)

Personal information
- Full name: Alfredo Junior Rojas Pajuelo
- Date of birth: 1 May 1991 (age 35)
- Place of birth: Callao, Peru
- Height: 1.73 m (5 ft 8 in)
- Position: Defensive midfielder

Team information
- Current team: Sport Huancayo
- Number: 6

Youth career
- Academia Cantolao

Senior career*
Years	Team	Apps	(Gls)
2011	Alianza Atlético	11	(0)
2011–2017	Juan Aurich	178	(2)
2017	Real Garcilaso	32	(1)
2018–2023	Sport Huancayo	133	(5)
2024	Juan Aurich	0	(0)
2024–	Sport Huancayo	4	(0)

International career
2012-2013	Peru	2	(0)
- * Club domestic league appearances and goals as of 27 October 2024

Alfredo Junior Rojas Pajuelo (born 1 May 1991) is a Peruvian professional footballer who plays as a defensive midfielder for Sport Huancayo in the Liga 1. Rojas is an aggressive, hard tackling player.

== Club career ==
Alfredo Rojas developed as a youth player in the popular Peruvian academy Academia Cantolao.

In January 2011 he joined Alianza Atlético, which at the time was competing the top-flight. There Rojas made his Torneo Descentralizado league debut on 13 March 2011 in Round 5 of the 2011 season away to Cienciano. With Alianza Atlético already down two goals at the famous Inca Garcilaso de la Vega Stadium, he entered the match in the 57th minute for Josimar Atoche, but the match finished in a 4–0 win for Cienciano.

Then on 4 July 2011 Rojas joined Chiclayo club Juan Aurich.

== Honours ==
Juan Aurich

- Torneo Descentralizado: 2011
