= Ignacio Drago =

Peruvian footballer (born 1985)

Personal information
- Date of birth: 27 October 1985 (age 41)
- Place of birth: Lima, Peru
- Height: 1.81 m (5 ft 11 in)
- Position: Goalkeeper

Senior career*
Years	Team	Apps	(Gls)
2005–2006	Unión Huaral	?	(?)
2007	Cienciano	?	(?)
2008	Deportivo Aviación	5	(0)
2009	Total Chalaco	0	(0)
2009–2010	Sport Boys	42	(0)
2011–2012	Juan Aurich	10	(0)
- * Club domestic league appearances and goals

Ignacio Drago (born 27 October 1985) is a Peruvian professional footballer who plays as a goalkeeper.

== Career ==
Drago started career out with Unión Huaral in 2005. He made a couple of appearances in the 2006 season.

Then in 2007 Drago joined Cienciano, There he had to compete with Jesús Cisneros and Juan Flores for a starting spot.

He then had spells with Deportivo Aviación in 2008 and later with Total Chalaco in 2009.

In January 2009 he joined Sport Boys, which were in the Segunda División at the time. He made 22 appearances his side's league winning season. With Boys promoted, he stayed on the following season and played 20 times in the Descentralizado.

Then in January 2011 Drago joined ambitious club Juan Aurich.

== Honours ==
Sport Boys

- Segunda División Peruana: 2009

Juan Aurich

- Torneo Descentralizado: 2011
