= César Medina =

César Medina may refer to:

- César Medina (Panamanian footballer) (born 1980), Panamanian footballer
- César Medina (Peruvian footballer) (born 1991), Peruvian footballer
