= Daniel Reyes =

Daniel Reyes may refer to:

- Daniel Reyes (boxer) (born 1972), Colombian Olympic boxer
- Daniel de los Reyes (born 1962), American percussionist
- Daniel Reyes (Nicaraguan footballer) (born 1990), Nicaraguan footballer for Sport Boys
- Daniel Reyes (Peruvian footballer) (born 1987), Peruvian footballer for Alianza Atlético
