= Christian La Torre =

Peruvian footballer (born 1990)

Personal information
- Full name: Christian La Torre Vilca
- Date of birth: 9 March 1990 (age 36)
- Place of birth: Comas, Peru
- Height: 1.80 m (5 ft 11 in)
- Position: Forward

Team information
- Current team: Sport Huancayo
- Number: 19

Senior career*
Years	Team	Apps	(Gls)
2006–2008	Sport Boys	14	(1)
2008–2009	Universitario de Deportes	7	(0)
2010	José Gálvez	0	(0)
2010–2011	Ashanti Heroes	3	(0)
2011–2012	Universitario de Deportes	0	(0)
2011	→ Sport Boys (loan)	5	(0)
2013–2017	Sport Huancayo	27	(3)
2017–2018	Alfonso Ugarte	10	(1)

International career
2007	Peru U17		
- * Club domestic league appearances and goals as of 19 April 2013

Christian La Torre (born 9 March 1990 in Comas) is a Peruvian footballer who plays as a forward. He currently plays for Sport Huancayo in the Torneo Descentralizado.

He was part of the Peru U17 side that made it to the quarterfinals of the U17 World Cup in S. Korea.

== Club career ==
La Torre started his career with Sport Boys, joining them in January 2006.

On 26 September 2008 La Torre signed for Universitario de Deportes.

== Honours ==
=== Club ===
Universitario de Deportes

- Torneo Descentralizado (1): 2009
- U-20 Copa Libertadores (1): 2011
