= Rodrigo Cuba =

Peruvian footballer (born 1992)

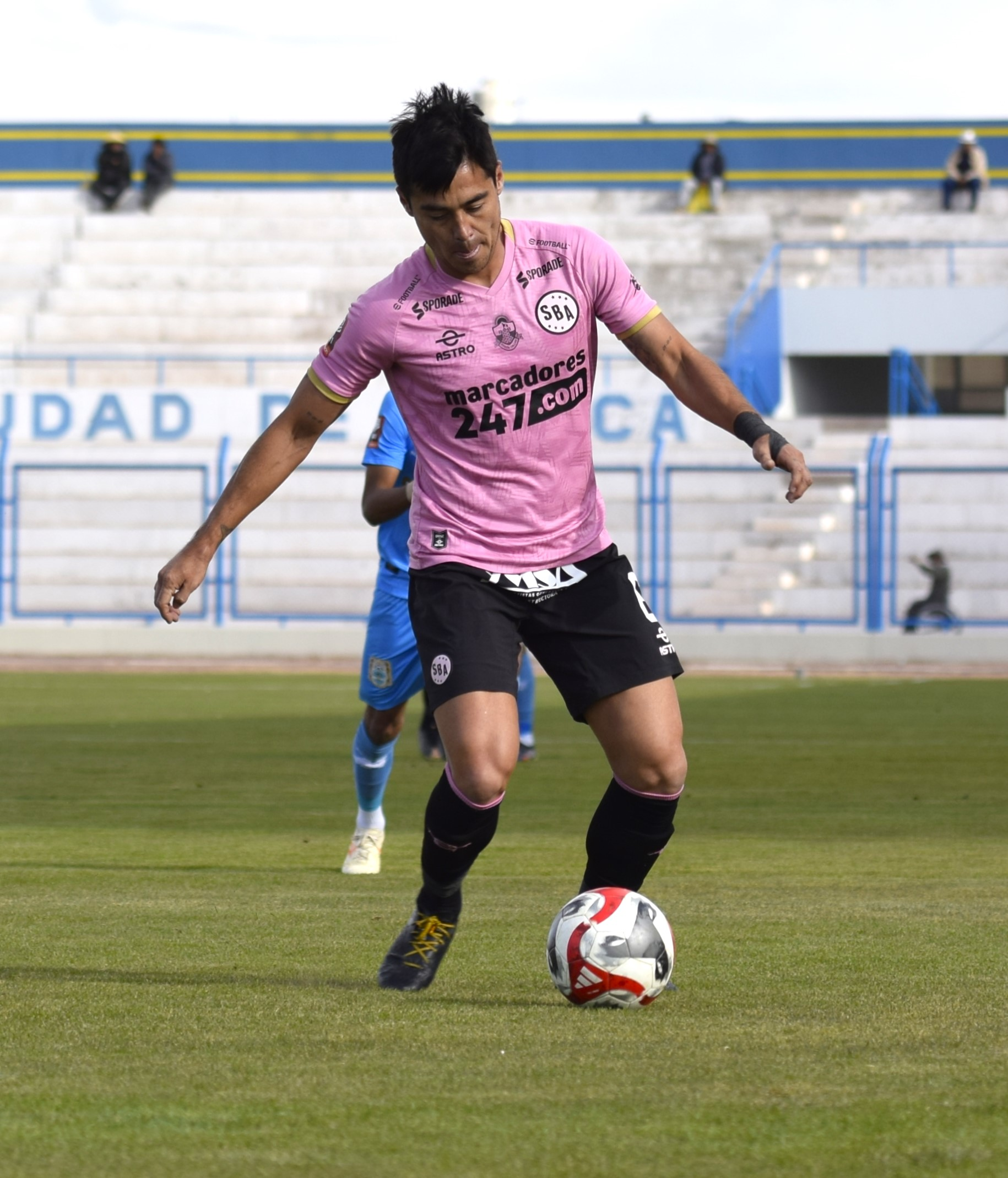
- Cuba in 2023

Personal information
- Full name: Rodrigo Cuba Piedra
- Date of birth: 17 May 1992 (age 34)
- Place of birth: Lima, Peru
- Height: 1.76 m (5 ft 9 in)
- Position: Right-back

Team information
- Current team: Sport Boys
- Number: 6

Youth career
- 2006: Academia Tito Drago
- 2007: José Gálvez FBC
- 2008–2009: Regatas Lima
- 2010–2011: Alianza Lima

Senior career*
| Years | Team | Apps | (Gls) |
| 2012–2013 | Alianza Lima | 30 | (2) |
| 2013–2015 | Juan Aurich | 45 | (6) |
| 2015–2016 | Universitario | 33 | (2) |
| 2017–2018 | Deportivo Municipal | 74 | (18) |
| 2019 | Alianza Lima | 17 | (2) |
| 2020 | Sport Boys | 0 | (0) |
| 2020 | Atlético Zacatepec | 3 | (0) |
| 2020 | Atlético Morelia | | |
| 2021 | César Vallejo | 16 | (1) |
| 2022– | Sport Boys | 24 | (3) |
- * Club domestic league appearances and goals as of 21:30, 27 November 2022 (UTC)

Rodrigo Cuba Piedra (born 17 May 1992) is a Peruvian footballer who plays as a right-back for Sport Boys.

== Career ==
Rodrigo Cuba began his senior career with Alianza Lima. He made his Torneo Descentralizado league debut on matchday 1 of the 2012 season in 2–2 draw at home against León de Huánuco. In his debut season Cuba made total of 18 league appearances.
