= Jorge Molina (footballer, born 1988) =

Peruvian footballer (born 1987)

Personal information
- Full name: Jorge Luis Molina Cabrera
- Date of birth: March 5, 1987 (age 39)
- Place of birth: Pisco, Peru
- Height: 1.70 m (5 ft 7 in)
- Position: Midfielder

Youth career
- Alianza Lima

Senior career*
Years	Team	Apps	(Gls)
2007	Total Clean	3	(0)
2008–2010	Alianza Lima	19	(0)
2011–2012	Juan Aurich	32	(0)
2013	León de Huánuco	33	(0)
2014	Alianza Lima	5	(0)
2015	Ayacucho	27	(1)
2016	Deportivo Coopsol	8	(0)
2017	Carlos A. Mannucci	21	(1)
2018–2021	Cienciano	79	(2)
2022	Carlos Stein	24	(0)
2023	Universidad de San Martín	19	(0)
- * Club domestic league appearances and goals

Jorge Luis Molina Cabrera (born 5 March 1987) is a Peruvian former professional footballer who played as a midfielder.

== Career ==
Playing for Arequipa-based club Total Clean, Molina made his Torneo Descentralizado debut on November 11, 2007 at home against Deportivo Municipal in the 2007 season. Manager Hélard Delgado put him in the starting eleven and later replaced Molina for Joel Sánchez in the 65th minute of the match, which finished in a 4–1 win for his club.

== Honours ==
Juan Aurich

- Peruvian First Division: 2011
