= Miguel Curiel =

Peruvian footballer (born 1988)

Personal information
- Full name: Miguel Ángel Curiel Arteaga
- Date of birth: 23 March 1988 (age 38)
- Place of birth: Lima, Peru
- Height: 1.90 m (6 ft 3 in)
- Position: Forward

Senior career*
Years	Team	Apps	(Gls)
2005–2007	Sport Boys		
2008	→ Universitario (loan)	0	(0)
2008	→ Alianza Atlético (loan)	8	(0)
2009–2010	Sport Boys	30	(6)
2010–2012	Alianza Lima	6	(0)
2013	Alfonso Ugarte	12	(1)
2014	Ferroviária	5	(1)
2014	Alianza Universidad	6	(2)
2015	Carlos A. Mannucci	17	(6)
2016	Águila	7	(1)
2016	Los Caimanes	6	(1)
2017	Deportivo Hualgayoc	21	(10)
2018	Unión Huaral	17	(12)
2018	Comerciantes Unidos	17	(5)
2019	Santiago Morning	21	(5)
2020	Cienciano	22	(4)
2021	UTC	14	(1)
- * Club domestic league appearances and goals as of 21:49, 16 January 2022 (UTC)

Miguel Ángel Curiel Arteaga (born 23 March 1988) is a Peruvian professional footballer who plays as a forward.

== Honours ==
Sport Boys

- Peruvian Segunda División: 2009

Alianza Lima

- Torneo de Promoción y Reservas: 2011

Individual

- Torneo de Promoción y Reservas top scorer: 2011
