= 2011 Torneo de Promoción y Reservas =

Torneo de Promoción y Reservas
- Season: 2011
- Champions: Alianza Lima; 1st title
- U-20 Copa Libertadores: Alianza Lima

The Torneo de Promoción y Reservas is a football tournament in Peru. There are currently 16 clubs in the league. Each team will have in staff to twelve 21-year-old players, three of 19 and three experienced; whenever they be recorded in the club. The team champion in this tournament will offer two points and the runner-up a point of bonus to the respective regular team in the 2011 Torneo Descentralizado.

== Teams ==
Locations of the 2011 Torneo de Promoción y Reserva teams

Team	City	Stadium	Capacity
Alianza Atlético	Sullana	Campeones del 36	8,000
Alianza Lima	Lima	Alejandro Villanueva	35,000
Cienciano	Cusco	Garcilaso	40,000
Cobresol	Moquegua	25 de Noviembre	25,000
CNI	Iquitos	Max Augustín	24,000
Inti Gas	Ayacucho	Ciudad de Cumaná	15,000
Juan Aurich	Chiclayo	Elías Aguirre	24,500
León de Huánuco	Huánuco	Heraclio Tapia	15,000
Melgar	Arequipa	Virgen de Chapi	40,217
Sport Boys	Callao	Miguel Grau	17,000
Sport Huancayo	Huancayo	Huancayo	20,000
Sporting Cristal	Lima	San Martín de Porres	18,000
Unión Comercio	Nueva Cajamarca	Carlos Vidaurre García	12,000
Universidad César Vallejo	Trujillo	Mansiche	25,000
Universidad San Martín	Lima	San Martín de Porres	18,000
Universitario	Lima	Monumental	80,093

== League table ==
=== Standings ===
Pos	Team	Pld	W	D	L	GF	GA	GD	Pts	Qualification
1	Alianza Lima	30	18	9	3	57	22	+35	63	Bonus +2 to 2011 Torneo Descentralizado
2	Juan Aurich	30	17	7	6	55	25	+30	58	Bonus +1 to 2011 Torneo Descentralizado
3	Universitario	30	16	8	6	53	25	+28	56	
4	Universidad César Vallejo	30	15	7	8	64	39	+25	52	
5	Unión Comercio	30	15	7	8	46	27	+19	52	
6	León de Huánuco	30	14	8	8	44	35	+9	50	
7	CNI	30	13	7	10	33	32	+1	46	
8	Universidad San Martín	30	12	9	9	42	27	+15	45	
9	Melgar	30	12	7	11	35	33	+2	43	
10	Sporting Cristal	30	11	4	15	39	35	+4	37	
11	Sport Huancayo	30	8	11	11	33	45	−12	35	
12	Cienciano	30	9	5	16	41	71	−30	32	
13	Cobresol	30	8	6	16	22	53	−31	30	
14	Sport Boys	30	8	3	19	26	51	−25	27	
15	Inti Gas	30	6	5	19	18	45	−27	23	
16	Alianza Atlético	30	4	5	21	24	67	−43	17	

Updated to match(es) played on 4 December 2011. Source:
Rules for classification: 1) points; 2) goal difference; 3) number of goals scored.

=== Results ===
Home \ Away	AAS	ALI	CIE	COB	CNI	MEL	IGD	JA	LEÓ	SBA	CRI	SHU	UCO	UCV	USM	UNI
Alianza Atlético		1–1	4–2	5–2	0–2	2–1	2–4	1–3	0–1	0–0	0–2	1–1	0–2	0–2	0–5	0–3
Alianza Lima	3–1		9–0	1–0	5–1	0–0	3–0	0–0	3–1	2–0	1–0	2–1	2–2	2–1	2–0	1–0
Cienciano	1–1	1–4		4–0	2–0	0–1	1–1	0–1	3–2	1–0	3–1	4–2	3–1	4–3	1–2	1–0
Cobresol	0–1	0–2	3–1		2–2	1–1	3–0	1–0	0–1	2–0	1–0	1–1	1–1	1–2	1–0	0–5
CNI	1–0	1–2	4–2	1–0		2–1	3–1	2–1	0–1	2–1	2–0	1–0	0–2	0–0	1–0	0–0
Melgar	2–1	0–0	0–0	6–0	0–2		1–0	0–1	2–1	2–1	1–0	1–1	1–0	4–0	2–0	0–1
Inti Gas	2–0	1–0	2–2	0–0	1–1	0–3		2–0	0–1	2–1	0–2	0–1	1–0	0–1	0–1	1–2
Juan Aurich	6–1	2–2	4–1	7–0	2–0	2–0	2–0		2–1	3–0	1–0	3–2	2–3	4–2	0–0	0–0
León de Huánuco	2–1	1–1	2–2	1–0	1–1	2–0	3–0	1–2		4–1	2–2	2–2	1–0	3–1	2–1	1–1
Sport Boys	1–0	2–3	2–0	0–2	1–0	1–1	1–0	0–1	2–0		1–0	0–3	1–5	2–2	3–0	1–3
Sporting Cristal	4–0	0–0	2–0	0–1	3–3	2–1	2–0	0–1	3–1	2–0		2–0	0–1	0–1	0–4	1–2
Sport Huancayo	1–1	1–1	1–0	2–0	2–0	2–1	1–2	0–1	1–1	2–0	1–5		1–0	1–1	0–0	2–2
Unión Comercio	3–0 (Note: Union Comercio won by W.O. to Alianza Atletico by decision of the CJ ADFP by bad inscription.)	1–3	1–0	1–0	1–0	5–0	2–0	2–2	1–1	2–1	2–0	2–0		3–1	1–1	0–0
Universidad César Vallejo	5–1	2–0	6–0	6–0	0–1	6–0	4–0	1–1	2–1	1–0	4–2	1–1	3–1		3–1	1–1
Universidad San Martín	2–0	1–2	4–1	0–0	0–0	0–0	1–0	2–1	2–0	2–3	1–1	5–0	0–0	3–0		2–1
Universitario	3–0	1–0	8–1	1–0	1–0	0–3	1–0	1–0	0–1	4–0	0–3	5–0	2–1	2–2	2–2	

Updated to match(es) played on 27 November 2011. Source: Soccerway
Legend: Blue = home team win; Yellow = draw; Red = away team win.

== Top goalscorers ==
22 goals

- (Peru) Miguel Curiel (Alianza Lima)

12 goals

- (Peru) Francesco Do Santos Recalde (Universidad César Vallejo)

11 goals

- (Peru) Sebastian Capurro (León de Huánuco)

10 goals

- (Peru) Jankarlo Chirinos (Universitario)
- (Peru) Joffre Vasquez (Juan Aurich)

9 goals

- (Peru) Julius Rengifo (CNI)

8 goals

- (Peru) Alberto Vela (Sport Boys)
- (Peru) Diego Virrueta (Cienciano)
