= Copa El Gráfico-Perú =

- Founded: 1999
- Region: South America (CONMEBOL)
- Teams: Variable
- Most championships: (Peru) Alianza Lima (2 titles) (Peru) Sporting Cristal (2 titles) (Peru) Cienciano (2 titles) (Uruguay) Peñarol (2 titles)

The Copa El Gráfico-Perú, was an international exhibition football competition hosted in Peru since 1999 until 2006. It features teams from Peru, Chile, Argentina and Uruguay. All matches are played at the Estadio Nacional in Lima.

== Champions ==
- (In bracket, title count):

Ed.	Season	Champion	Runner-up
1	1999	(Peru) Alianza Lima (1)	(Peru) Universitario
2	2000	(Peru) Universitario (1)	Universidad de Chile
3	2001–I	(Peru) Sporting Cristal (1)	(Peru) Universitario
4	2001–II	(Peru) Juan Aurich (1)	(Peru) Universitario
5	2001–III	(Peru) Melgar (1)	(Peru) Alianza Lima
6	2002–I	(Uruguay) Peñarol (1)	(Peru) Alianza Lima
7	2002–II	(Uruguay) Peñarol (2)	(Peru) Sporting Cristal
8	2003	(Peru) Alianza Lima (2)	(Argentina) Independiente
9	2004	(Peru) Cienciano (1)	(Argentina) Estudiantes
10	2005	(Peru) Cienciano (2)	(Peru) Universitario
11	2006	(Peru) Sporting Cristal (2)	(Peru) José Gálvez

=== Titles by club ===
Club	Winners	Winning Seasons
(Peru) Alianza Lima	2	1999, 2003
(Peru) Cienciano	2	2004, 2005
(Uruguay) Peñarol	2	2002–I, 2002–II
(Peru) Sporting Cristal	2	2001–I, 2006
(Peru) Juan Aurich	1	2001–II
(Peru) Melgar	1	2001–III
(Peru) Universitario	1	2000

== 1999 Copa El Gráfico-Perú ==
31 January 1999	Alianza Lima (Peru)	2–0	(Peru) Universitario	Nacional, Lima
	Claudio Pizarro; Tressor Moreno

== 2000 Copa El Gráfico-Perú ==
30 January 2000	Universitario (Peru)	1–0	Universidad de Chile	Nacional, Lima
	José del Solar

== 2001–I Copa El Gráfico-Perú ==
28 January 2001	Sporting Cristal (Peru)	5–3	(Peru) Universitario	Nacional, Lima
	Frank Rojas; Piero Alva; Roberto Silva; Jorge Soto		Sergio Ibarra; Gustavo Grondona; Fernando Martínez

== 2001–II Copa El Gráfico-Perú ==
3 February 2001	Juan Aurich (Peru)	2–2	(Peru) Universitario	Elías Aguirre, Chiclayo

== 2001–III Copa El Gráfico-Perú ==
11 February 2001	Melgar (Peru)	2–1	(Peru) Alianza Lima	Monumental UNSA, Arequipa

== 2002-I Copa El Gráfico-Perú ==
20 January 2002	Alianza Lima (Peru)	1–2	(Uruguay) Peñarol	Nacional, Lima
	Roberto Farfán		Daniel Jiménez; Joe Bizera

== 2002-II Copa El Gráfico-Perú ==
23 January 2002	Sporting Cristal (Peru)	2–2	(Uruguay) Peñarol	Nacional, Lima
	Jorge Soto; Luis Bonnet		Fabián Canobbio; Daniel Jiménez

== 2003 Copa El Gráfico-Perú ==
28 January 2003	Alianza Lima (Peru)	4–0	(Argentina) Independiente	Nacional, Lima
	Henry Quinteros; José Soto; Waldir Sáenz; Antonio Serrano

== 2004 Copa El Gráfico-Perú ==
18 January 2004	Cienciano (Peru)	0–0 (4–3 p)	(Argentina) Estudiantes	Nacional, Lima
	Penalties
	Sergio Ibarra (penalty scored); Miguel Llanos (penalty scored); Alfredo Carmona (penalty missed); Santiago Acasiete (penalty scored); Giuliano Portilla (penalty scored)		(penalty scored) Ernesto Farías; (penalty scored) Castagno Suárez; (penalty missed) Rodolfo Aquino; (penalty scored) Leonardo Luppino; (penalty missed) Juan Cáceres

== 2005 Copa El Gráfico-Perú ==
29 January 2005	Cienciano (Peru)	0–0 (5–3 p)	(Peru) Universitario	Nacional, Lima
	Penalties
	Sergio Ibarra (penalty scored); Jair Butrón (penalty scored); Miguel Mostto (penalty scored); Jair Yglesias (penalty scored); Carlos Lobatón (penalty scored)		(penalty scored) Carlos Flores; (penalty scored) Miguel Zagaceta; (penalty missed) Luis Guadalupe; (penalty scored) Johan Sotil

== 2006 Copa El Gráfico-Perú ==
=== Semifinals ===
25 January 2006	Alianza Lima (Peru)	2–2 (7–8 p)	(Peru) José Gálvez	Nacional, Lima
	Wilmer Aguirre 24'; Manuel Corrales 86'		Angelo Cruzado 34'; Erick Torres 45+1'

25 January 2006	Sporting Cristal (Peru)	2–1	(Peru) Cienciano	Nacional, Lima
	Henry Quinteros 19'; Carlos Zegarra 43'		Miguel Mostto 47'

=== Third Place ===
28 January 2006	Alianza Lima (Peru)	0–0 (4–3 p)	(Peru) Cienciano	Nacional, Lima

=== Final ===
28 January 2006	Sporting Cristal (Peru)	2–2 (4–2 p)	(Peru) José Gálvez	Nacional, Lima
	Gustavo Vasallo 4'; Henry Colán 5'		Angelo Cruzado 46'; Sebastián Domínguez 90'
	Penalties
	Sergio Leal (penalty missed); Henry Quinteros (penalty scored); David Soria (penalty scored); Carlos Zegarra (penalty scored); Amilton Prado (penalty scored)		(penalty scored) Erick Torres; (penalty missed) Juan Pérez; (penalty missed) Cristian García; (penalty scored) Sebastián Domínguez
