= Anderson Cueto =

Peruvian footballer (born 1989)

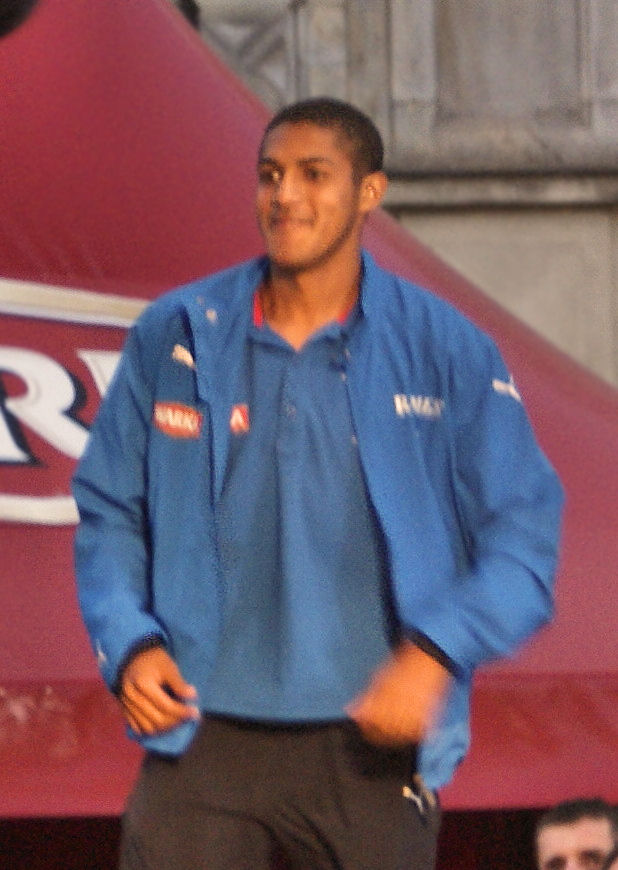
- Cueto with Lech Poznań

Personal information
- Full name: Anderson Denyro Cueto Sánchez
- Date of birth: 29 May 1989 (age 37)
- Place of birth: Lima, Peru
- Height: 1.73 m (5 ft 8 in)
- Positions: Winger; attacking midfielder

Senior career*
Years	Team	Apps	(Gls)
2007	Sporting Cristal	0	(0)
2007–2010	Lech Poznań	31	(2)
2010	Sporting Cristal	11	(1)
2011–2012	Juan Aurich	34	(3)
2013	Alianza Lima	12	(1)
2013	Real Garcilaso	10	(0)
2015–2016	Sport Boys	40	(10)
2017	Sport Victoria	24	(7)
2018	Juan Aurich	26	(8)
2019	Pirata	25	(0)
2021	Santa Rosa	3	(0)
- * Club domestic league appearances and goals

Anderson Denyro Cueto Sánchez (born 29 May 1989) is a Peruvian former professional footballer who played as a winger.

== Club career ==
Cueto began his career in youth ranks of Sporting Cristal. Then in July 2008 he left Cristal and joined Polish club Lech Poznań. After a two years in Poznań, Cueto returned to Sporting Cristal in July 2010. With Cristal, he made 11 appearances and scored one goal for the remaining second half of the 2010 season.

On 11 January 2011, Anderson left Cristal and signed a three-year contract with Club Juan Aurich. On 29 January 2013, Cueto signed for Peruvian giants Alianza Lima.

== Honours ==
Lech Poznań

- Ekstraklasa: 2009–10
- Polish Cup: 2008–09

Juan Aurich

- Torneo Descentralizado: 2011
