= Andrés Salinas =

Colombian footballer (born 1986)

Personal information
- Full name: Andrés Felipe Salinas
- Date of birth: June 11, 1986 (age 40)
- Place of birth: Santiago de Cali, Colombia
- Height: 1.84 m (6 ft 0 in)
- Position: Defender

Team information
- Current team: José Gálvez
- Number: 4

Senior career*
Years	Team	Apps	(Gls)
2007–2008	Millonarios	12	(1)
2009	Real Cartagena		
2011	Inti Gas		
2012–present	José Gálvez		
- * Club domestic league appearances and goals as of 27 March 2008

Andrés Felipe Salinas (born June 11, 1986) is a Colombian football defender, who currently plays for José Gálvez in the Torneo Descentralizado. Salinas is a product of the Millonarios youth system and played with the Millonarios first team since January, 2007.

== Playing career ==
After being promoted plays with Millonarios in the Torneo Internacional Copa Ciudad de Santa Fe in Santa Fe, Argentina. On October 31, 2007, scored his first senior goal at senior level against Boyacá Chicó F.C. in the Week Fifteen on Copa Mustang II match that won Millonarios (2:1).

== Statistics ==
Year	Team	Matches	Goals
2007	Millonarios	5	1
2008	Millonarios	7	0
