= Juan Aurich (disambiguation) =

Juan Aurich is the name of several football clubs from Chiclayo, Peru.

- Club Deportivo Juan Aurich, founded in 1922 and last played in the Primera División in 1991
- Aurich–Cañaña, the result of the fusion of the traditional clubs Juan Aurich (1922–1992) and Deportivo Cañaña, existed between 1993 and 1996.
- Juan Aurich de Chiclayo, founded in 1996 and played in the first division between 1998 and 2002
- Juan Aurich de La Victoria, founded in 2005 following the dissolution of Juan Aurich de Chiclayo and currently plays in the second division
