= Sergio Unrein =

Argentine footballer

Personal information
- Full name: Sergio Ezequiel Unrein
- Date of birth: 16 June 1991 (age 35)
- Place of birth: Santiago del Estero, Argentina
- Height: 1.75 m (5 ft 9 in)
- Position: Forward

Team information
- Current team: Atlántico FC

Youth career
- 2005–2011: Boca Juniors

Senior career*
Years	Team	Apps	(Gls)
2011–2014	Boca Juniors	0	(0)
2012	→ Ñublense (loan)	7	(1)
2014	Juan Aurich	5	(0)
2015	Fénix	6	(0)
2016–2017	Zulia	62	(12)
2018	Pahang FA	2	(0)
2018–2019	Ayia Napa	8	(0)
2019	Unión Santiago	2	(0)
2019	Costa Brava		
2020	Delfines del Este	0	(0)
2020–	Atlántico FC		
- * Club domestic league appearances and goals as of 17:51, 13 January 2021 (UTC)

Sergio Ezequiel Unrein (born 16 June 1991) is an Argentine footballer who plays as a striker for Atlántico FC in the Dominican Republic.

== Career ==
=== Club ===
In January 2018, Unrein went on trial with Kazakhstan Premier League club Irtysh Pavlodar.

In the same month, he was signed by Pahang FA of Malaysia Super League, but he was released in February after only playing 1 league game with them and replaced by Francis Forkey Doe.

== Honours ==
=== Club ===
Boca Juniors

- Primera División Argentina (1): 2011 Apertura

=== Individual ===
Top-scorer

- AFA Youth Tournament (5): 2005, 2006, 2007, 2008, 2009
- U-20 Copa Libertadores (1): 2011
