= Daniel Reyes (Peruvian footballer) =

Peruvian footballer (born 1987)

Personal information
- Full name: Daniel Alexander Reyes Buenaño
- Date of birth: 12 December 1987 (age 38)
- Place of birth: Chincha, Peru
- Height: 1.78 m (5 ft 10 in)
- Position: Goalkeeper

Team information
- Current team: Pirata
- Number: 16

Youth career
- Alianza Lima

Senior career*
Years	Team	Apps	(Gls)
2007	Alianza Lima	0	(0)
2008	Deportivo Aviación		
2009–2011	Alianza Atlético	42	(0)
2012–2013	José Gálvez	42	(0)
2014	UT Cajamarca	0	(0)
2015	Unión Comercio	5	(0)
2015	Carlos Mannucci	8	(0)
2016	Alianza Atlético	6	(0)
2017	Los Caimanes	13	(0)
2018	Deportivo Coopsol	6	(0)
2019	Comerciantes Unidos	21	(0)
2020	Santos de Nasca		
2020–	Pirata	9	(0)
- * Club domestic league appearances and goals as of 23:44, 19 December 2020 (UTC)

Daniel Alexander Reyes Buenaño (born 12 December 1987) is a Peruvian footballer who plays for Pirata F.C. in the Peruvian Segunda División as a goalkeeper.

== Club career ==
Daniel Reyes was promoted to Alianza Lima's first team in 2007 but did not make a league appearance for them that season.

He then played in the Segunda División in 2008 with Deportivo Aviación.

Reyes then joined Alianza Atlético in January 2009. He made his debut in the Torneo Descentralizado in the 2010 season and finished his debut season with 14 appearances.
