= Jorge Rivera (footballer, born 1978) =

Colombian footballer

Jorge Rivera Galindo (born October 28, 1978, in Puerto Tejada, Cauca, Colombia) is a Colombian footballer currently playing for León de Huánuco of the Primera División in Peru.

== Teams ==
- (Colombia) Real Cartagena 1999
- (Peru) Alcides Vigo 2000–2002
- (Peru) Estudiantes de Medicina 2003
- (Peru) Unión Huaral 2004–2006
- (Peru) Alianza Atlético 2007–2008
- (Chile) O'Higgins 2009
- (Peru) Juan Aurich 2010
- (Peru) Sport Huancayo 2011
- (Peru) Alianza Lima 2012
- (Peru) León de Huánuco 2013–present

== Titles ==
- (Colombia) Real Cartagena 1999 (Primera B Colombian)
- (Peru) Alcides Vigo 2001 (Segunda División Peruana)
