= José Canova =

Peruvian footballer (born 1992)

Personal information
- Full name: José Vladimir Canova Hernández
- Date of birth: 30 September 1992 (age 34)
- Place of birth: Pisco, Peru
- Height: 1.85 m (6 ft 1 in)
- Position: Centre back

Team information
- Current team: Alianza Universidad
- Number: 3

Youth career
- 2006–2009: Club Frontera
- 2010: Alianza Lima

Senior career*
| Years | Team | Apps | (Gls) |
| 2011–2014 | Alianza Lima | 40 | (0) |
| 2015–2016 | Universidad San Martín | 19 | (0) |
| 2016–2017 | UCV | 16 | (0) |
| 2017–2018 | Sport Rosario | 51 | (2) |
| 2018–2019 | Real Garcilaso | 22 | (0) |
| 2020– | Alianza Universidad | 4 | (0) |

International career
| 2012– | Peru | 1 | (0) |
- * Club domestic league appearances and goals as of 13:47, 15 April 2020 (UTC)

José Vladimir Canova Hernández (born 30 September 1992) commonly known as José Canova, is a Peruvian footballer who plays as a centre back for Alianza Universidad in the Peruvian Primera División.

== Club career ==
José Canova began playing for local side Club Frontera de Pisco from 2006 to 2009. Then in 2010 he joined Alianza Lima. Canova made his league debut in the Torneo Descentralizado in the last round of the 2011 season at home to Sport Boys. He played as a starter at right back and lasted until the 62nd minute in side's 3–0 win over Boys. That was his only game of the 2011 season.

== International career ==
Canova was called up to play his first match for the Peru national team on 13 August 2012 in an upcoming friendly.
