= Jorge Bazán =

Peruvian footballer (born 1991)

Personal information
- Full name: Jorge Luis Bazán Lazarte
- Date of birth: 23 March 1991 (age 35)
- Place of birth: Lima, Peru
- Height: 1.72 m (5 ft 8 in)
- Position: Winger

Team information
- Current team: Deportivo Garcilaso
- Number: 7

Youth career
- 2007–2009: Esther Grande Bentín
- 2009–2011: Alianza Lima

Senior career*
Years	Team	Apps	(Gls)
2011–2013	Alianza Lima	100	(7)
2014	Inti Gas Deportes	2	(0)
2014	Juan Aurich	14	(0)
2015	Alianza Atlético	31	(3)
2016	Alianza Lima	26	(2)
2017	Alianza Atlético	40	(1)
2018	UTC Cajamarca	40	(2)
2019–2021	Sport Huancayo	57	(3)
2021–2022	Deportivo Municipal	42	(3)
2023–	Deportivo Garcilaso	76	(2)

International career
2011	Peru U-20		
- * Club domestic league appearances and goals as of 30 December 2025

Jorge Luis Bazán Lazarte (born 23 March 1991) is a Peruvian footballer who plays as a winger. He currently plays for Deportivo Garcilaso in the Peruvian Primera División.

== Club career ==
Bazán developed as footballer in the popular youth academy of Esther Grande de Bentín and was in the same category as other rising players such as Luis Advíncula, Werner Schuler and Benjamín Ubierna.

Bazán made his Descentralizado league debut on 13 February 2011 in Round 1 of the 2011 season against Unión Comercio. At home in the Matute Stadium, he entered the match in the 71st minute for Alexander Sánchez and also managed to score his first professional goal. His debut goal was scored in the 85th minute of the match, which finished 4–1 in favor of Alianza Lima.
