= Israel Kahn =

Peruvian footballer (born 1988)

Personal information
- Full name: Eduardo Israel Kahn Gómez
- Date of birth: 1 December 1988 (age 37)
- Place of birth: Lima, Peru
- Height: 1.76 m (5 ft 9 in)
- Positions: Attacking midfielder; winger

Team information
- Current team: Deportivo Coopsol

Youth career
- Academia Cantolao

Senior career*
Years	Team	Apps	(Gls)
2008	UT Cajamarca	5	(0)
2009	Unión Huaral	0	(0)
2009	Juventud La Rural	1	(0)
2010–2011	Alianza Atlético	64	(10)
2012–2013	Juan Aurich	43	(10)
2014	Alianza Lima	19	(2)
2014	Universidad César Vallejo	12	(1)
2015	Alianza Atlético	12	(1)
2015	Los Caimanes	2	(0)
2016	Defensor La Bocana	10	(0)
2017	Ayacucho	29	(3)
2018	Deportivo Coopsol	58	(16)
2019–	Sport Chavelines	21	(4)
2019–	Carlos Stein	2	(0)
2023–	Deportivo Coopsol	10	(0)
- * Club domestic league appearances and goals as of 21:17, 17 September 2023 (UTC)

Eduardo Israel Kahn Gómez (born 1 December 1988), known as Israel Kahn, is a Peruvian professional footballer who plays as an attacking midfielder for Deportivo Coopsol.

== Career ==
Kahn made his Peruvian First Division league debut on 14 February 2010 in the first round of the 2010 season. The manager at the time, Teddy Cardama, allowed him to play the entire match for his debut, which contributed to Alianza Atlético's 2–1 win over Cienciano del Cuzco. In round 11 that season, Kahn scored his first Peruvian First Division league goal on 25 April 2010 away to Universitario de Deportes in the Monumental. He scored his goal in the 51st minute, but it was not enough as Raúl Ruidíaz scored the winner for the home team resulting in a 2–1 loss for Alianza Atlético.

On 11 January 2019 it was confirmed, that Kahn had signed for Peruvian Primera División club Real Garcilaso.
