= Jorge Cabrera (footballer) =

Uruguayan footballer (born 1969)

Personal information
- Full name: Jorge Daniel Cabrera Curbelo
- Date of birth: 13 August 1963 (age 63)
- Place of birth: Uruguay
- Position: Striker

Senior career*
Years	Team	Apps	(Gls)
1984–1986	Bella Vista	5	(0)
1987–1988	Peñarol	14	(3)
1988–1989	Tigres		
1989–1990	Correcaminos		
1990–1991	Querétaro	0	(0)
1991–1993	Correcaminos		
1993–1995	Tampico Madero	0	(0)
1995–1996	Querétaro	0	(0)
1996	Huracán Buceo		
- * Club domestic league appearances and goals

Jorge Daniel Cabrera Curbelo (born 13 August 1963) is a Uruguayan former footballer who played as a striker.

== Early life ==
Cabrera was born in 1963 in Uruguay. He has a sister.

== Career ==
In 1987, Cabrera signed for Uruguayan side Peñarol. He helped the club win the 1987 Copa Libertadores. In 1993, he signed for Mexican side Correcaminos. He was described as "managed to form a fearsome duo with Panamanian Victor Rene Mendieta" while playing for the club.
