= Cristofer Soto =

Peruvian footballer (born 1990)

Personal information
- Full name: Cristofer Augusto Jesús Soto Gonzáles
- Date of birth: January 6, 1990 (age 36)
- Place of birth: Lima, Peru
- Height: 1.73 m (5 ft 8 in)
- Position: Forward

Youth career
- –2006: Alianza Lima

Senior career*
Years	Team	Apps	(Gls)
2007–2011	Alianza Lima	40	(8)
2009	→ CNI (loan)	29	(7)
2012–2013	Universidad San Martín	15	(1)
2013	UTC	4	(0)
2014	Unión Huaral	0	(0)
2014	León de Huánuco	5	(0)
2015	Ayacucho	30	(7)
2016	Comerciantes Unidos	3	(1)
2017	Cienciano	8	(1)
2018	Alfredo Salinas		
2018	Unión Huaral	15	(8)
- * Club domestic league appearances and goals as of 11:23, 18 June 2019 (UTC)

Cristofer Augusto Jesús Soto Gonzáles (born 6 January 1990) is a Peruvian footballer who plays as a forward.

== Club career ==
Soto came through youth ranks of Alianza Lima. Soto made his professional debut in the Torneo Descentralizado on 17 February 2008 in the first round of the 2008 season. The match was away to Huaraz against Sport Ancash and finished in a 1-0 loss for Alianza. He entered the match in the 70th minute replacing Reimond Manco.

In 2009, having no chances on the first team, he was loaned out to CNI. He returned to Alianza in the 2010 season. In 2011 Soto played the in 2011 U-20 Copa Libertadores, where he finished as the top goalscorer.
