= Jesús Villalobos =

Chilean footballer (born 1993)

Personal information
- Full name: Jesús Robinson Villalobos Bascuñán
- Date of birth: 17 March 1993 (age 33)
- Place of birth: Talca, Chile
- Height: 1.87 m (6 ft 1 1/2 in)
- Position: Defender

Youth career
- Rangers
- 2008–2012: Universidad Católica

Senior career*
Years	Team	Apps	(Gls)
2012–2015	Universidad Católica	1	(0)
2013–2014	→ San Antonio Unido (loan)	25	(3)
2014–2015	→ Rangers (loan)	18	(2)
2015–2016	→ Deportes Santa Cruz (loan)	18	(0)
2016–2017	Rangers	3	(0)
2016–2017	→ San Antonio Unido (loan)	12	(0)
2017	→ Utenis Utena (loan)	10	(0)
2018	Malleco Unido	20	(3)
Total		107	(8)

International career
2010	Chile U18		
- * Club domestic league appearances and goals

Jesús Robinson Villalobos Bascuñán (born 17 March 1993) is a Chilean former footballer who played as a defender. Besides Chile, he played in Lithuania.

== Career ==
Jesus debuts at UC in the national tournament play from the first minute to Cobresal.

At international level, Villalobos represented Chile at under-18 level in 2010.
