= César Medina (Peruvian footballer) =

Peruvian footballer (born 1991)

Personal information
- Full name: César Manuel Medina Lozada
- Date of birth: 8 May 1991 (age 35)
- Place of birth: Chimbote, Peru
- Height: 1.66 m (5 ft 5 in)
- Position: Attacking midfielder

Senior career*
Years	Team	Apps	(Gls)
2008	Cultural Casma		
2009–2013	José Gálvez		
2014	León de Huánuco	18	(1)
2015	Unión Comercio	5	(0)
2015	Sport Loreto	14	(3)
2016	Ayacucho	3	(0)
2017	Carlos A. Mannucci	28	(5)
2018	José Gálvez		
2019	Chavelines		
2020	Tarma		
2021	Alfonso Ugarte		
2022	Virgen de La Natividad		
2023	Racing de Huamachuco		
- * Club domestic league appearances and goals as of 00:08, 31 January 2021 (UTC)

César Manuel Medina Lozada (born 8 May 1991) is a Peruvian professional footballer who plays as an attacking midfielder for Tarma.

He is nicknamed "La Rata".

== Club career ==
Medina started his career playing for local side Club Cultural Casma in 2008. In January 2009 he joined Torneo Descentralizado club José Gálvez. Medina made his debut in the Descentralizado in the 2009 season. In his first season in the top flight, he only managed to make 5 appearances. Medina helped José Gálvez win the 2011 Peruvian Segunda División title, which put him on the radar for larger teams. However, he chose to remain at his hometown club for the time being. Medina emerged as a "sensation" for the club in 2012 under manager Javier Arce, and renewed his contract after the season. In 2013, he confirmed that he would be leaving the club.

Medina played with León de Huánuco in 2014, but was unsatisfied with his playing time. He then played for both Unión Comercio and Sport Loreto in 2015 – scoring three goals for the latter – before signing a one-year contract with Ayacucho ahead of the 2016 season. In April 2016, Medina suffered a retinal haemorrhage and was hospitalized after he was hit in the head with the ball during a reserves match. In January 2017, he signed with Carlos A. Mannucci.

In February 2020, Medina signed with Tarma ahead of the 2020 Copa Perú. However, the tournament was later cancelled due to the COVID-19 pandemic in Peru. Medina then signed for Alfonso Ugarte ahead of the 2021 Copa Perú. On 22 November, he scored a goal in a 3–1 win over Los Caimanes which secured their spot in the semifinals of the competition. Medina helped Alfonso Ugarte reach the final one week later, starting in the defeat to his former club, Tarma. In 2022, he suited up for Virgen de La Natividad, helping them reach the national stage of the 2022 Copa Perú.

In January 2023, Medina joined Racing de Huamachuco.

== Honours ==
José Gálvez

- Torneo Intermedio: 2011
- Segunda División Peruana: 2011
