= Marco Ruiz (footballer) =

Peruvian footballer (born 1979)

Marco Ruíz
Personal information
- Full name: Marco Antonio Ruíz Torres
- Date of birth: 26 September 1979 (age 47)
- Place of birth: Lima, Peru
- Height: 1.82 m (6 ft 0 in)
- Position: Midfielder

Senior career*
Years	Team	Apps	(Gls)
2001	Coopsol Trujillo	1	(0)
2001–2002	Deportivo Wanka	45	(0)
2003–2005	Coronel Bolognesi	58	(2)
2005–2007	Universitario	72	(5)
2008	Sport Boys	22	(1)
2008	Sport Ancash	18	(0)
2009	Total Chalaco	20	(0)
2010	Inti Gas	38	(2)
2011	Unión Comercio	12	(0)
2012–2013	José Gálvez	61	(4)
2014	Deportivo Coopsol	17	(1)
2015	Sport Victoria	10	(1)
2016	Unión Tarapoto	6	(0)
2016	Unión Huaral	6	(0)
2019	Sport Victoria	4	(0)

International career
2003	Peru	1	(0)
- * Club domestic league appearances and goals

Marco Antonio "Chemo" Ruíz Torres (born 26 September 1979) is a Peruvian former professional footballer who played as a midfielder.

== Club career ==
Ruiz started his senior career with Sport Coopsol Trujillo, making his Torneo Descentralizado debut in the 2001 season. He only managed to make one league appearance in his time in Trujillo.

In July 2001 he joined Deportivo Wanka for the second half the season. He made three league appearances for his new club to wrap up his debut season in the top flight. In his second season there he was a regular starter with 42 league games played. However his club could not avoid relegation at the end of the 2002 Descentralizado season.

In January 2003 Ruiz joined Coronel Bolognesi.

== International career ==
Ruiz was called up for his debut match for the Peru national team by Paulo Autuori. His debut was on 27 August 2003 at home in a 0–0 friendly match against Guatemala.
