= Luis Trujillo (Peruvian footballer) =

Peruvian footballer (born 1990)

Personal information
- Full name: Luis Enrique Trujillo Ortiz
- Date of birth: December 27, 1990 (age 35)
- Place of birth: Talara, Peru
- Height: 1.74 m (5 ft 9 in)
- Positions: Left-back; left winger

Team information
- Current team: Santos de Nasca
- Number: 27

Youth career
- Alianza Lima

Senior career*
| Years | Team | Apps | (Gls) |
| 2007–2011 | Alianza Lima | 82 | (8) |
| 2012 | Juan Aurich | 31 | (1) |
| 2013–2016 | Alianza Lima | 207 | (15) |
| 2017–2018 | Sport Huancayo | 59 | (5) |
| 2019 | Ayacucho | 19 | (0) |
| 2020 | Cienciano | 25 | (3) |
| 2021–2023 | UTC | 71 | (6) |
| 2024 | Union Comercio | 14 | (0) |
| 2024– | Santos de Nasca | 5 | (0) |

International career
| 2009–2011 | Peru | 5 | (0) |
- * Club domestic league appearances and goals as of 19:22, 6 October 2022 (UTC)

Luis Enrique Trujillo Ortiz (born December 27, 1990) is a Peruvian professional footballer who plays as a left back or left winger for Santos de Nasca in the Liga 2.

== Club career ==
=== Alianza Lima ===
Trujillo made his Torneo Descentralizado league debut for Alianza Lima in the last game of the 2007 season on December 16, 2007, at the age of 16. In his debut match, he started from the beginning and scored two goals to help Alianza win 6–0 at home against Deportivo Municipal.

On February 24, 2011, he was declared a free player since Alianza Lima did not pay his salary for three months.

=== Juan Aurich ===
On February 27, 2012, Trujillo joined Chiclayo-based club Juan Aurich for the start of the 2012 season. He joined as a free player and signed a two-year contract with the 2011 Descentralizado champions.

== International career ==
Trujillo played for the Peru national team at the 2007 FIFA U-17 World Cup in the Republic of Korea, and has moved up to play for the senior side in the 2010 FIFA World Cup qualifying rounds.
