= 2011 Torneo Descentralizado =

Torneo Descentralizado
- Season: 2011
- Dates: 12 February 2011 – 14 December 2011
- Champions: Juan Aurich; 1st Primera División title
- Relegated: Alianza Atlético; CNI
- Copa Libertadores: Juan Aurich; Alianza Lima; Sport Huancayo
- Copa Sudamericana: Universidad San Martín; León de Huánuco; Unión Comercio; Inti Gas
- Top goalscorer: Luis Tejada (17 goals)

The 2011 Torneo Descentralizado de Fútbol Profesional (known as the 2011 Copa Movistar for sponsorship reasons) was the ninety-fifth season of Association Peruvian football. A total of 16 teams competed in the tournament, with Universidad de San Martín as the defending champion. The Torneo Descentralizado began on 12 February and concluded on 14 December with the victory of Juan Aurich over Alianza Lima in the penalty kicks of the final Play-off, giving Juan Aurich its debut Peruvian title.

== Competition modus ==
The sixteen teams played a round-robin home-and-away round for a total of 30 matches each. The teams that finish in first and second place played in the Play-off to determine the season champion. The teams that place fifteenth and sixteenth were relegated. The Torneo de Promoción y Reserva was played alongside the Descentralizado with the reserve teams of each first division team. The champion of the reserve competition will award its senior team 2 points while the runner-up will award 1 point. Between the fifteenth and sixteenth round, there was a two-month recess for the Peru national football team's participation in the 2011 Copa América. During the recess, the Torneo Intermedio knock-out competition was played. In this competition all sixteen first division teams in addition to some Segunda División teams and amateur teams competed. All international competition berths were distributed via the league table with the first three teams qualifying to the Copa Libertadores and the subsequent three teams qualifying to the Copa Sudamericana.

== Teams ==
José Gálvez and Total Chalaco finished the 2010 season in 15th and 16th place, respectively, in the aggregate table and thus were relegated to the Segunda División. They were replaced by the champion of the 2010 Segunda División, Cobresol and the champion of the 2010 Copa Perú, Unión Comercio.

=== Team changes ===
| Promoted from 2010 Segunda División | Promoted from 2010 Copa Perú | Relegated from 2010 Primera División |
|---|---|---|
| ▲ Cobresol (1st) | ▲ Unión Comercio (1st) | ▼ José Gálvez (15th) ▼ Total Chalaco (16th) |

=== Stadia locations ===
Locations of the 2011 Primera División teams

| Team | City | Stadium | Capacity |
|---|---|---|---|
| Alianza Atlético | Sullana | Miguel Grau (Piura) | 25,000 |
| Alianza Lima | Lima | Alejandro Villanueva | 35,000 |
| Cienciano | Cusco | Garcilaso | 40,000 |
| Cobresol | Moquegua | 25 de Noviembre | 25,000 |
| CNI | Iquitos | Max Augustín | 24,000 |
| Inti Gas | Ayacucho | Ciudad de Cumaná | 15,000 |
| Juan Aurich | Chiclayo | Elías Aguirre | 24,500 |
| León de Huánuco | Huánuco | Heraclio Tapia | 15,000 |
| Melgar | Arequipa | Virgen de Chapi | 40,217 |
| Sport Boys | Callao | Miguel Grau | 17,000 |
| Sport Huancayo | Huancayo | Huancayo | 20,000 |
| Sporting Cristal | Lima | San Martín de Porres | 18,000 |
| Unión Comercio | Nueva Cajamarca | IPD de Moyobamba | 12,000 |
| Universidad César Vallejo | Trujillo | Mansiche | 25,000 |
| Universidad San Martín | Lima | San Martín de Porres | 18,000 |
| Universitario | Lima | Monumental | 80,093 |

=== Managerial changes ===
| Team | Outgoing manager | Manner of departure | Date of vacancy | Table | Incoming manager | Date of appointment |
Pre-season changes
| Unión Comercio | Leonardo Morales | End of contract | | N/A | Hernán Lisi | |
| Cienciano | Sergio Ibarra | Resigned | | N/A | Marcelo Trobianni | |
| Alianza Atlético | Teddy Cardama | End of contract | | N/A | Roque Alfaro | |
| Cobresol | Freddy García | End of contract | | N/A | Teddy Cardama | |
| Sporting Cristal | Víctor Rivera | End of contract | | N/A | Guillermo Rivarola | |
| Melgar | Carlos Jurado | End of contract | | N/A | Claudio Techera | |
First Stage changes
| Universidad César Vallejo | Benjamín Navarro | End of contract | December 2010 | N/A | Víctor Rivera | 16 December 2010 |
| Juan Aurich | Juan Reynoso | Resigned | 30 December 2010 | N/A | Diego Umaña | 5 January 2011 |
| Sporting Cristal | Guillermo Rivarola | Sacked | 19 April 2011 | 9th | Juan Reynoso | 21 April 2011 |
| Unión Comercio | Hernán Lisi | Mutual agreement | 12 May 2011 | 10th | Gustavo Buena | 19 May 2011 |
| Melgar | Claudio Techera | Sacked | 16 May 2011 | 15th | Wilmar Valencia | 2 May 2011 |
| Alianza Atlético | Roque Alfaro | Sacked | 17 May 2011 | 16th | Roberto Arrelucea | 19 May 2011 |
| Sport Boys | Miguel Company | Sacked | 10 June 2011 | 13th | Agustín Castillo | 10 June 2011 |
| Alianza Lima | Gustavo Costas | Resigned | 18 July 2011 | 1st | Miguel Ángel Arrué (interim) | 19 July 2011 |
| Unión Comercio | Gustavo Buena | Sacked | 22 July 2011 | 10th | Julio César Uribe | 27 July 2011 |
| Cienciano | Marcelo Trobianni | Sacked | 29 August 2011 | 5th | Carlos Jurado | 11 September 2011 |
| CNI | Marcial Salazar | Resigned | 26 September 2011 | 15th | Jorge Giordano | 27 September 2011 |
| Sporting Cristal | Juan Reynoso | Resigned | 22 November 2011 | 15th | Francisco Melgar (interim) | 23 September 2011 |

== Standings ==
| Pos | Team | Pld | W | D | L | GF | GA | GD | Pts | Qualification or relegation |
|---|---|---|---|---|---|---|---|---|---|---|
| 1 | Juan Aurich (C, O) | 30 | 15 | 11 | 4 | 46 | 21 | +25 | 57 (Note: Juan Aurich obtained 1 point as 2011 Torneo de Promoción y Reserva runner-up.) | 2012 Copa Libertadores Second Stage and Championship Play-offs |
| 2 | Alianza Lima | 30 | 16 | 7 | 7 | 44 | 25 | +19 | 57 (Note: Alianza Lima obtained 2 points as 2011 Torneo de Promoción y Reserva champion.) | 2012 Copa Libertadores Second Stage and Championship Play-offs |
| 3 | Sport Huancayo | 30 | 15 | 5 | 10 | 49 | 33 | +16 | 50 | 2012 Copa Libertadores First Stage |
| 4 | Universidad San Martín | 30 | 13 | 8 | 9 | 43 | 24 | +19 | 47 | 2012 Copa Sudamericana First Stage |
| 5 | León de Huánuco | 30 | 14 | 4 | 12 | 37 | 30 | +7 | 46 | 2012 Copa Sudamericana First Stage |
| 6 | Unión Comercio | 30 | 13 | 6 | 11 | 48 | 42 | +6 | 45 | 2012 Copa Sudamericana First Stage |
| 7 | Inti Gas | 30 | 12 | 8 | 10 | 42 | 41 | +1 | 44 | 2012 Copa Sudamericana First Stage |
| 8 | Cienciano | 30 | 12 | 4 | 14 | 42 | 46 | −4 | 40 | |
| 9 | Cobresol | 30 | 9 | 12 | 9 | 31 | 40 | −9 | 39 | |
| 10 | Sporting Cristal | 30 | 10 | 8 | 12 | 30 | 34 | −4 | 38 | |
| 11 | Sport Boys | 30 | 10 | 6 | 14 | 26 | 49 | −23 | 36 | |
| 12 | Melgar | 30 | 9 | 7 | 14 | 37 | 44 | −7 | 34 | |
| 13 | Universidad César Vallejo | 30 | 9 | 7 | 14 | 32 | 42 | −10 | 34 | |
| 14 | Universitario | 30 | 8 | 10 | 12 | 25 | 35 | −10 | 34 | |
| 15 | Alianza Atlético (R) | 30 | 10 | 3 | 17 | 24 | 41 | −17 | 33 | 2012 Segunda División |
| 16 | CNI (R) | 30 | 9 | 6 | 15 | 35 | 44 | −9 | 30 (Note: Colegio Nacional Iquitos were deducted 3 points for maintaining debts with 3 former players.) | 2012 Segunda División |

Updated to match(es) played on 21 November 2011. Source: Soccerway
Rules for classification: 1) points; 2) goal difference; 3) number of goals scored; 4) head-to-head record.
(C) Champions; (O) Play-off winners; (R) Relegated

== Results ==
| Home \ Away | AAS | ALI | CIE | COB | CNI | MEL | IGD | JA | LEÓ | SBA | CRI | SHU | UCO | UCV | USM | UNI |
|---|---|---|---|---|---|---|---|---|---|---|---|---|---|---|---|---|
| Alianza Atlético | | 0–2 | 3–1 | 1–2 | 2–1 | 2–1 | 3–0 | 1–1 | 1–0 | 1–2 | 2–1 | 0–2 | 1–0 | 0–1 | 1–2 | 3–0 (Note: Match between Alianza Atlético and Universitario was voided by the FPF. The original match result was a 0–0 draw. A 3–0 win was recorded in favor of Alianza Atlético.) |
| Alianza Lima | 1–0 | | 2–0 | 0–0 | 1–0 | 2–0 | 4–2 | 1–0 | 2–1 | 3–0 | 0–0 | 0–2 | 4–1 | 2–1 | 0–0 | 0–0 |
| Cienciano | 4–0 | 0–1 | | 5–0 | 1–2 | 2–3 | 2–1 | 2–1 | 1–0 | 3–0 | 0–1 | 1–0 | 2–2 | 1–0 | 3–2 | 3–0 |
| Cobresol | 0–1 | 0–5 | 0–0 | | 3–1 | 2–1 | 3–1 | 1–1 | 1–1 | 2–2 | 1–1 | 0–0 | 1–0 | 1–2 | 0–0 | 1–1 |
| CNI | 2–0 | 3–0 (Note: Match between Colegio Nacional Iquitos and Alianza Lima was voided by the FPF. The original match result was a 0–1 in favor of Alianza Lima. A 3–0 win was recorded in favor of Colegio Nacional Iquitos.) | 0–2 | 2–2 | | 1–3 | 0–1 | 0–1 | 2–3 (Note: Match was played in Estadio Carlos Vidaurre García.) | 3–0 (Note: Match between Colegio Nacional Iquitos and Sport Boys was voided by the FPF. The original match result was a 1–1 draw. A 3–0 win was recorded in favor of Colegio Nacional Iquitos.) | 2–1 | 1–3 | 0–0 | 1–0 | 3–1 | 1–1 |
| Melgar | 0–1 | 3–2 | 0–4 | 1–2 | 0–0 | | 2–2 | 1–1 | 1–0 | 0–1 | 2–1 | 2–2 | 1–2 | 3–0 | 0–1 | 0–0 |
| Inti Gas | 1–0 (Note: Match was played in Estadio Municipal de Huanta.) | 0–2 | 2–2 | 3–0 | 4–0 | 2–0 | | 0–0 | 1–0 | 3–1 | 2–0 | 1–2 | 1–0 | 3–0 | 2–0 | 0–0 |
| Juan Aurich | 2–1 | 2–0 | 5–0 | 2–1 | 2–2 | 1–1 | 3–0 | | 2–0 | 2–2 | 2–1 | 1–0 | 3–2 | 2–0 | 1–0 | 1–0 |
| León de Huánuco | 4–0 | 2–0 | 4–0 | 0–1 | 1–3 | 1–0 | 1–2 | 2–1 | | 1–0 | 1–1 | 2–1 | 1–0 | 3–1 | 1–0 | 2–0 |
| Sport Boys | 0–0 | 0–5 | 2–0 | 1–0 | 1–0 | 2–1 | 3–1 | 0–5 | 1–1 | | 0–1 | 0–3 (Note: Match not played. A 3–0 win was awarded to Sport Huancayo) | 1–3 | 1–1 | 1–0 | 2–0 |
| Sporting Cristal | 1–0 | 1–1 | 1–0 | 1–1 | 1–1 | 1–2 | 0–0 | 0–2 | 0–2 | 3–0 (Note: Match between Sporting Cristal and Sport Boys was voided by the FPF. The original match result was a 1–1 draw. A 3–0 win was recorded in favor of Sporting Cristal.) | | 3–0 | 2–1 | 2–1 | 0–4 | 3–0 (Note: Match between Universitario and Sporting Cristal was voided by the FPF. The original match result was a 0–0 draw. A 3–0 win was recorded in favor of Sporting Cristal.) |
| Sport Huancayo | 3–0 | 0–2 | 2–2 | 1–5 | 3–1 | 4–1 | 2–2 (Note: Match played in Estadio Mariscal Castilla del Tambo.) | 0–0 | 1–0 | 3–0 | 3–0 | | 3–1 | 3–0 | 2–0 | 1–0 |
| Unión Comercio | 2–0 | 0–0 | 3–1 | 3–0 (Note: Match between Unión Comercio and Cobresol was voided by the FPF. The original match result was a 1–1 draw. A 3–0 win was recorded in favor of Unión Comercio.) | 3–0 | 1–2 | 3–2 | 1–1 | 5–1 | 0–0 | 1–0 | 2–1 | | 5–2 | 2–1 | 3–2 |
| Universidad César Vallejo | 0–0 | 1–1 | 2–0 | 3–0 (Note: Match between Universidad César Vallejo and Cobresol was voided by the FPF. The original match result was a 1–0 win for U. César Vallejo. The match result was extended to a 3–0 win for U. César Vallejo.) | 3–0 | 2–1 | 3–3 | 1–0 | 0–1 | 1–2 | 1–0 | 2–0 | 1–1 | | 0–2 | 0–0 |
| Universidad San Martín | 4–0 | 4–0 (Note: Match was played at Estadio Miguel Grau in Callao.) | 2–0 | 0–0 | 1–0 | 2–2 | 5–0 | 1–1 | 0–0 | 1–0 | 1–1 | 2–1 | 5–1 | 2–1 | | 0–0 |
| Universitario | 1–0 | 2–1 | 5–0 | 0–1 | 0–3 (Note: Match between Universitario and Colegio Nacional Iquitos was voided by the FPF. The original match result was a 2–0 in favor of Universitario. A 3–0 win was recorded in favor of Colegio Nacional Iquitos.) | 0–3 (Note: Match not played. A 3–0 win was awarded to FBC Melgar) | 0–0 | 0–0 | 2–1 | 2–1 | 1–2 | 2–1 | 3–0 | 2–2 (Note: Match was played in Estadio Nacional.) | 1–0 | |

Updated to match(es) played on 21 November 2011. Source: ADFP.org.pe
Legend: Blue = home team win; Yellow = draw; Red = away team win.

== Play-off ==
The finals (also known as the Play-off) of the 2011 season were played between the two best placed teams of the league table. The club with the most points on the aggregate table choose which leg they play as the home team. They also choose the venue of the third match in case both teams are tied on points after the second leg. The first leg was played on 8 December and the second leg on 11 December.

8 December 2011
16:00
First leg

| Juan Aurich | 1–2 | Alianza Lima |
|---|---|---|
| Zúñiga 51' | Report | Arroé 20'; Bazán 46' |

Estadio Elías Aguirre
Attendance: 19,229
Referee: George Buckley

11 December 2011
16:00
Second leg

| Alianza Lima | 0–1 | Juan Aurich |
|---|---|---|
| | Report | Zúñiga 63' |

Estadio Alejandro Villanueva
Attendance: 29,846
Referee: Victor Hugo Carrillo

14 December 2011
16:30
Third leg

| Juan Aurich | 0–0 (a.e.t.) | Alianza Lima |
|---|---|---|
| | Report |
Penalties
| Sheput (penalty scored); Balbuena (penalty scored); Ciciliano (penalty scored) | 3–1 | (penalty missed) González; (penalty scored) Soto; (penalty missed) Trujillo; (penalty missed) Vílchez |

Estadio Nacional
Attendance: 29,213
Referee: Victor Hugo Rivera

Tied 2–2 on aggregate. Juan Aurich won 3–1 on penalties.

== Top goalscorers ==
| Rank | Player | Club | Goals |
|---|---|---|---|
| 1 | (Panama) Luis Tejada | Juan Aurich | 17 |
| 2 | (Colombia) Humberto Osorio | Inti Gas | 16 |
| 2 | (Peru) Roberto Jiménez | Unión Comercio | 16 |
| 4 | (Peru) Irven Ávila | Sport Huancayo | 14 |
| 4 | (Paraguay) Roberto Ovelar | Alianza Lima | 14 |
| 6 | (Peru) Sergio Ibarra | Cienciano | 11 |
| 7 | (Peru) Johan Fano | Universitario | 10 |
| 7 | (Argentina) Claudio Velásquez | Cobresol | 10 |
| 7 | (Colombia) Julio Caicedo | Cobresol | 10 |
| 10 | (Peru) Antonio Meza Cuadra | Melgar | 9 |

- Source: ADFP.org.pe
- Last updated: To games played in Round 30

== See also ==
- 2011 Peruvian Segunda División
- 2011 Copa Perú
- 2011 Torneo de Promoción y Reserva
