= José Gálvez FBC =

Association football club in Peru

- Full name: José Gálvez Foot Ball Club
- Nicknames: La Franja, Pesqueros
- Founded: 27 October 1951; 75 years ago
- Ground: Estadio Manuel Rivera Sánchez
- Capacity: 32,000
- President: Romel Velásquez
- Manager: Favio Campana
- League: Copa Perú
- 2019: National Stage
- Website: www.josegalvezfbc.com
Home colours	Away colours

José Gálvez FBC is a Peruvian football club based in Chimbote, Ancash. The club was founded in 1951 under the name Manuel Rivera after the famous Chimbote born footballer Manuel Rivera. The club was forced to change its name because the FPF did not allow clubs to be named after living people. Then on 11 November 1963 the club decided the new name would be José Gálvez FBC. The club currently plays in the Copa Perú, the fourth tier of the Peruvian football league system.

More recently the club played in the Peruvian Second Division and finished as champions in 2011. Thus they were promoted back to the Torneo Descentralizado in the 2012 season only to be relegated on the 2013 and become the Peruvian team with the most relegations from the Peruvian First Division.

== History ==
The club was founded on 27 October 1951 as Club Deportivo Manuel Rivera in recognition of the famous Chimbote born footballer Manuel Rivera, who played for the Peru national team and at that time for Deportivo Municipal. The club kept its original name for about the next eleven years, but then the Peruvian Football Federation decided against allowing clubs to be named after living people. As a result, the club changed its name on 11 November 1963 to José Gálvez Foot Ball Club. The club makes its season debut with its new name in 1964 in the First Division league of Chimbote. The club's first victory was a 2–0 win over Strong Boys on 18 October 1964, with goals from Gonzalo Ponce and Chiang.

In 1971 José Gálvez managed to finish in third place of the 1971 Copa Perú which that season allowed promotion to the top three teams in the Final group stage. Consequently, the club's first ever appearance in the Peruvian First Division was in the 1971 Torneo Descentralizado season.

The club was 1996 and 2005 Copa Perú champion, when it defeated Senati in the finals.

The club have played at the highest level of Peruvian football on eleven occasions, since its first participation in 1971 Torneo Descentralizado to the 2012 Torneo Descentralizado.

The club was 2011 Torneo Intermedio champion, by defeating Sport Ancash in the finals. The club is also the Peruvian supercup 2012 Copa Federación champion.

== Stadium ==
Jose Galvez plays their home games at Estadio Manuel Rivera Sánchez located in Chimbote. The stadium has a capacity of 32,000, making it one of the largest stadiums in Peru.

== Rivalries ==
Jose Galvez FBC has had a long-standing rivalry with Sport Ancash.

== Historical list of coaches ==
- (Argentina) José Basualdo (1 March 2006 – 30 June 2006)
- (Peru) Rafael Castillo (1 Jan 2008 – 24 August 2009)
- (Paraguay) Víctor Genés (20 Aug 2009 – 31 December 2009)
- (Peru) Julio César Uribe (Jan 2010 – June 2010)
- (Peru) Mario Flores (3 July 2010 – 29 November 2010)
- (Peru) Rafael Castillo (1 Jan 2011 – 10 January 2012)
- (Peru) Wilmar Valencia (10 Jan 2012 – 27 March 2012)
- (Peru) Javier Arce (27 March 2012 – 17 April 2013)
- (Peru) Nolberto Solano (18 April 2013 – 23 July 2013)
- (Argentina) Julio Alberto Zamora (23 July 2013–)

== Honours ==
=== Senior titles ===
Keys

- Record
- ^{(s)} Shared record

Type	Competition	Titles	Runner-up	Winning years	Runner-up years
National (League)	Segunda División	1	—	2011	—
National (League)	Intermedia (1984–1987)	—	1	—	1984 Zona Norte
National (League)	Copa Perú	2	—	1996, 2005	—
Half-year / Short tournament (League)	Torneo Interzonal	1	—	1972 Regional	—
National (Cups)	Copa Inca	1^{(s)}	—	2011	—
National (Cups)	Copa Federación	1	—	2012	—
Regional (League)	Región Norte B	1	—	1971	—
Regional (League)	Región III	1	—	1994	—
Regional (League)	Región II	1	4	1996	2001, 2002, 2004, 2005
Regional (League)	Liga Departamental de Áncash	16	3	1967, 1969, 1970, 1975, 1977, 1979, 1980, 1993, 1995, 1996, 2001, 2002, 2003, 2005, 2017, 2019	1976, 2000, 2004
Regional (League)	Liga Provincial de Santa	12	1	1975, 1976, 1977, 1979, 1993, 1999, 2000, 2001, 2002, 2003, 2005, 2017	2019
Regional (League)	Liga Distrital de Chimbote	16	4	1964, 1965, 1966, 1967, 1968, 1969, 1970, 1971, 1975, 1976, 1977, 1979, 2002, 2004, 2019, 2026	2016, 2017, 2022, 2025
Regional (League)	Segunda Distrital de Chimbote	1	—	2024	—

=== Friendlies ===
Type	Competition	Titles	Runner-up	Winning years	Runner-up years
International (Cup)	Copa El Gráfico-Perú	—	1	—	2006
