= Juan Aurich =

Association football club

- Full name: Club Juan Aurich S. A.
- Nickname: El Ciclón del Norte (The Northern Cyclone)
- Founded: September 3, 1922; 104 years ago (as the previous Juan Aurich)
- Ground: Estadio Elías Aguirre
- Capacity: 24,500
- President: José Carlos Isla
- Manager: Roger Ushiñahua
- League: Liga 3
- 2024: Liga 2, Disqualified
- Website: www.clubjuanaurich.com.pe
Home colours	Away colours	Third colours

Club Juan Aurich S. A., commonly known as Juan Aurich, is a Peruvian football club based in Chiclayo. The original Juan Aurich club was founded in 1922, this incarnation however was founded in 2005. The club currently plays in the Peruvian Tercera División, the third tier of Peruvian football. They play their home games at the Estadio Elías Aguirre in Chiclayo, which has a capacity of 24,500.

Although the current Juan Aurich has played for only a few years in the top-flight, three other football clubs named Juan Aurich have played in the Torneo Descentralizado. The first Juan Aurich was founded in 1922 and played in the first division between 1967 and 1983 and again between 1988 and 1991. Between 1994 and 1996 the merged football club Aurich–Cañaña had a brief spell in the Primera División after they achieved promotion through the 1993 Copa Perú. Finally, a third Juan Aurich football club achieved promotion in 1997 by winning the 1997 Copa Perú. This spell in the first division lasted from 1998 to 2002.

The club's first major success was won in 2007 with the promotion to the Primera División via the Copa Perú. Four years later they conquered their second major success after winning the 2011 Torneo Descentralizado, defeating Alianza Lima in the third leg of the finals in a penalty shootout.

== History ==
The club has had several restructurings since its formation in 1922.

=== Juan Aurich (1922–1992) ===
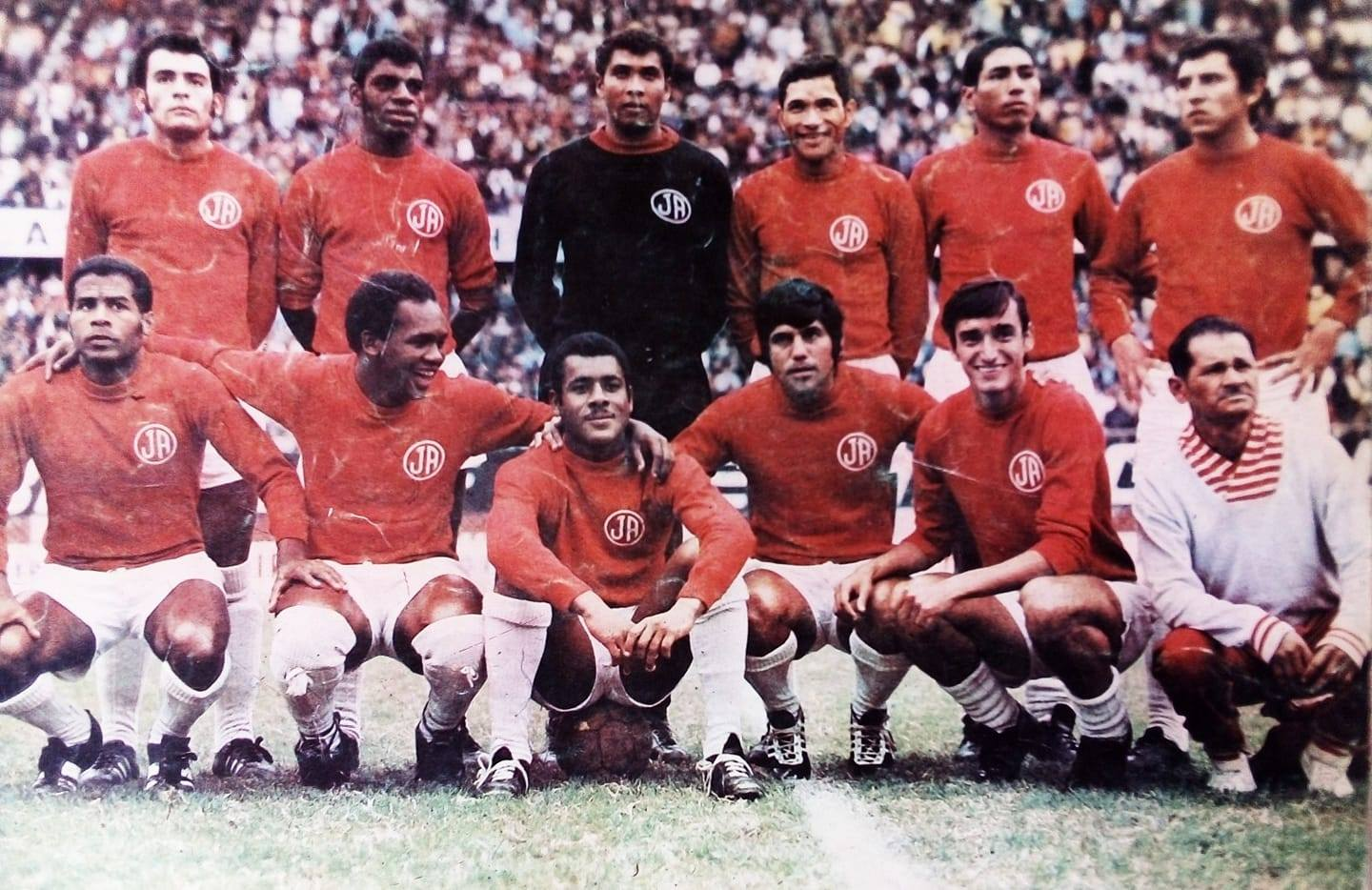
Juan Aurich 1971 squad

The first incarnation of the football club was founded by a group of workers of the hacienda Batán Grande on 3 September 1922 as Club Deportivo Juan Aurich, after the owner of the hacienda, Juan Aurich Pastor. The club played two spells in the first division (Primera División), the first between 1967 and 1983 and the second between 1988 and 1991. They dissolved shortly after losing their place in the top flight (1991 Torneo Descentralizado)

=== Aurich-Cañaña ===
Following their relegation at the end of the 1991 Torneo Descentralizado, a new football club was formed, albeit a merge, between the remaining Juan Aurich club and Deportivo Cañaña. This merged club—led by manager Horacioa Baldessari won the 1993 Copa Perú and gained promotion to 1994 Torneo Descentralizado when they defeated FBC Aurora, Unión Juventud, Deportivo Garcilaso, and Colegio Nacional Iquitos in the final group. They held a brief spell there between 1994 and 1996 until their relegation at the end of the 1996 Torneo Descentralizado season, when they were relegated to the Copa Perú.

=== Juan Aurich (1996–2004) ===
A new reincarnation of Juan Aurich was formed as Juan Aurich de Chiclayo shortly after Aurich–Cañaña was relegated; their nickname was El Ciclón del Norte (The Northern Cyclone). The new Juan Aurich achieved promotion through the 1997 Copa Perú and played in the first division from 1998 until 2002 when they were relegated. Due to the financial strain created by playing in the top flight, Juan Aurich de Chiclayo also folded as its predecessors.

=== Foundation and promotion ===
In November 2004, Juan Merino Aurich took control of the waning football club Mariscal Nieto of the La Victoria district of the Chiclayo province. Merino converted the club to Juan Aurich de La Victoria and founded the current incarnation of Juan Aurich on 28 January 2005. In 2006, they finished first in the regional stage of the 2006 Copa Perú advanced to the national stage of the tournament. They overcame their rivals in the Round of 16 and the quarter-finals but fell to Hijos de Acosvinchos in the semifinals. The following season they again reached the regional stage of the 2007 Copa Perú and finished first. This time, however, they achieved promotion to the 2008 Torneo Descentralizado by advancing to and winning the finals. Baldessari, as in 1993, led the team and defeated Sport Águila in the finals in a penalty shootout.

=== First seasons of professional football ===
Their first season in the first division was not remarkable. In the Torneo Apertura, they finished eighth and in the Torneo Clausura they finished twelfth. Consequently, the club finished twelfth on the aggregate table and tied on points with Atlético Minero, which finished thirteenth. The two teams played an extra match to determine the relegated team. Juan Aurich defeated Atlético Minero 2–1 and remained in the first division.

In the 2009 Torneo Descentralizado, the club made a huge improvement with manager Franco Navarro. They finished first in the first stage of the season and were one of the favorites to reach the finals. As leading team of the first stage, they started first in their group of the second stage. However, in October, two months before the end of the season, the club and Navarro terminated the manager's contract. The club hired Luis Fernando Suárez to finish coaching what was left of the season. Alianza Lima, which was second of the group at the start of second stage, surpassed Juan Aurich and failed to advance to the finals. At the end of the season the club finished third on the aggregate table, qualifying for the 2010 Copa Libertadores.

The club continued with Suárez into the 2010 season, which began on a high note after they eliminated Estudiantes Tecos in the first stage of the 2010 Copa Libertadores. They advanced to Group 3 of the competition with Copa Libertadores defending champions Estudiantes de La Plata, Alianza Lima, and Bolívar. They did not advance to the following stage as they finished third behind Estudiantes and Alianza Lima. In the 2010 Torneo Descentralizado the club's performance suffered which led to Suárez's exit from the club but they managed to obtain the last berth to the 2011 Copa Sudamericana under Juan Reynoso. In mid-2010 he became Anonymous Society.

=== First professional title ===
The following season they achieved their greatest success yet. The club started by hiring Colombian Diego Umaña after Reynoso resigned from the managing position. Under Umaña's direction, they returned as contenders for the title and successfully reached the finals of the 2011 Torneo Descentralizado. They lost the first leg at home 1–2 against Alianza Lima and were in danger of losing the chance to win their first professional championship. Surprisingly, in the second leg they held their own against Alianza at the Estadio Alejandro Villanueva and achieved a narrow 1–0 win with a memorable goal from Ysrael Zúñiga in the second half. As both teams had won a match of the finals, a third leg was forced to be played in the Estadio Nacional. A scoreless draw at the Nacional led to a penalty shootout. The final score of the shootout was 3–1 in favor of Juan Aurich. They were the first club outside the Lima Region to win the Torneo Descentralizado since FBC Melgar in 1981.

== Colors and badge ==
The original Club Deportivo Juan Aurich's colors were red and white. Both Juan Aurich de Chiclayo and Juan Aurich de La Victoria adopted the same colors and the same badge.

The club modified its crest at the beginning of 2015, which includes the name of the team, the city of Chiclayo and the year of its foundation (1922). In addition, in its new image, Juan Aurich also sports a star on the left side. This symbol refers to the 'Ciclón' team that died in 1953 in an accident, in the club's well-remembered tragedy, which is why the tribute is made. The golden star at the top corresponds to the national title obtained in 2011.

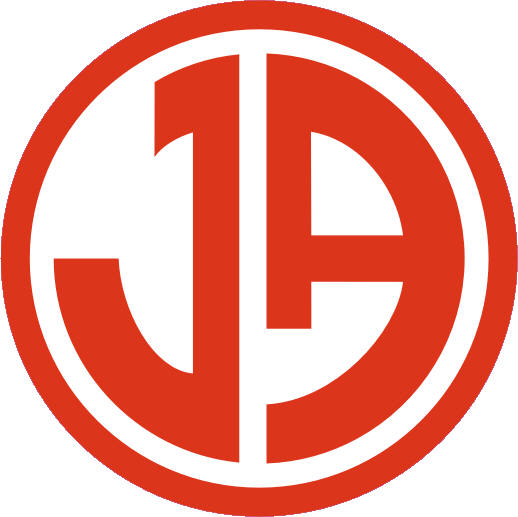
1922-2011

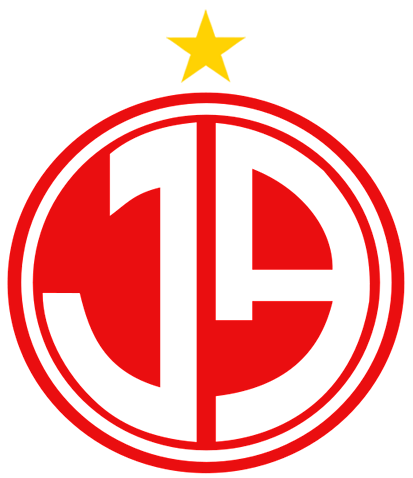
2011-2015

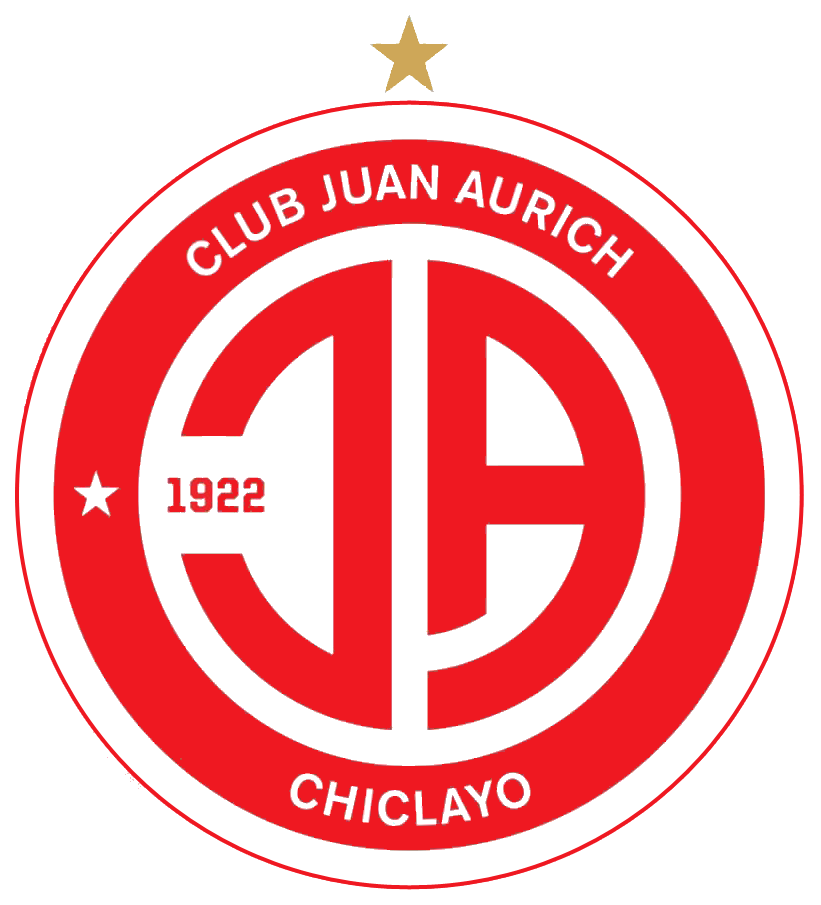
2015-2022

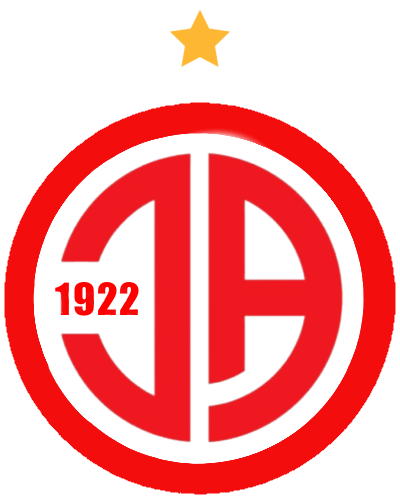
2023-present

== Stadium ==
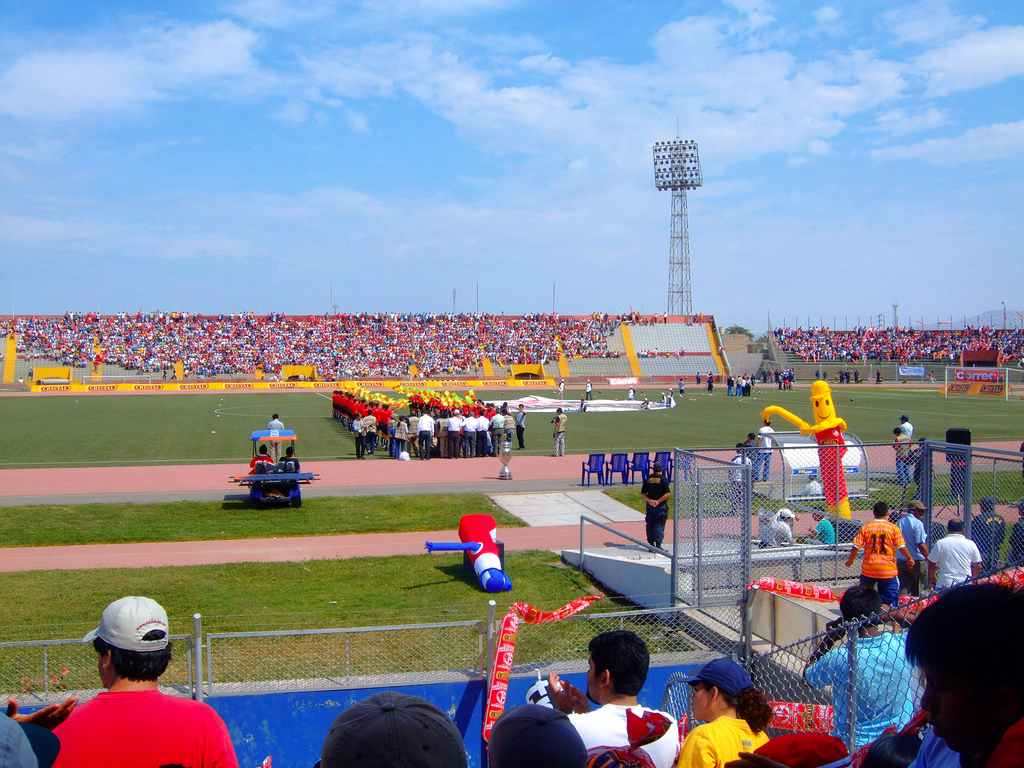
Estadio Elías Aguirrefrom the Occidente stand

Juan Aurich plays in the multi-purpose stadium Estadio Elías Aguirre which has a capacity of 24,500. Built between 1968 and 1970 by the municipality of the Chiclayo Province, it was named after the 19th century Peruvian sailor Elías Aguirre Romero. The municipality transferred administration of the stadium to the Instituto Peruano del Deporte. The stadium was renovated for the 2004 Copa América and again for the 2005 FIFA U-17 World Championship in which artificial turf was installed. The stadium is also home to many football clubs of the Chiclayo province that compete in the Ligas Distritales. In 2013, the stadium was closed for renovations in preparation for the 2013 Bolivarian Games to be held in Trujillo. Consequently, Juan Aurich has temporarily moved its home matches to the Estadio Francisco Mendoza Pizarro, located in Olmos.

== Current squad ==
As of 29 March 2025

Note: Flags indicate national team as defined under FIFA eligibility rules; some limited exceptions apply. Players may hold more than one non-FIFA nationality.

No.	Pos.	Nation	Player
1	GK	PER	Alexis Bazul
2	DF	PER	Waldir Antón
4	DF	PER	Rodrigo Robles
6	MF	PER	Leonardo Carrillo (captain)
7	FW	PER	Enzo Díaz
8	MF	PER	José Ríos
9	FW	PER	Anthony Montalvo
10	FW	PER	Nilton Oliva
11	MF	PER	Jouseh Chávez
12	GK	PER	Johnson Rodríguez
14	FW	PER	Aaron Vilchez
16	DF	PER	Jaime Diaz
17	DF	PER	Juan Diego Isla

No.	Pos.	Nation	Player
18	FW	PER	Diego Ñiquen
20	FW	PER	Emerson Salazar
21	DF	PER	Fabriccio Butrón
23	FW	PER	Harrys Núñez
25	MF	PER	Anderson Távara
26	MF	PER	Bruce Perez
27	DF	PER	Edward Cabrejos
28	DF	PER	Ronald Amaya
33	FW	PER	Jamil Chamaya
34	MF	PER	Eduardo Hernández
35	DF	PER	Pablo Quevedo
80	DF	PER	Franco Aldana

== Honours ==
Juan Aurich has a total of three major achievements. Their first important achievement was their conquest of the Copa Perú in 1997 which led to the promotion of the club to the first division. Their most important achievement, however, was their first Primera División title won in 2011. In addition, their reserve team won the reserve league Torneo de Promoción y Reserva in 2012.

=== Senior titles ===
Keys

- Record
- ^{(s)} Shared record

Type	Competition	Titles	Runner-up	Winning years	Runner-up years
National (League)	Primera División	1	2	2011	1968, 2014
National (League)	Liga 2	—	1	—	2020
National (League)	Copa Perú	2	—	1997, 2007	—
Half-year / Short; Tournament (League)	Torneo Apertura	1	—	2014	—
National (Cups)	Copa Federación	—	1	—	2012
Regional (League)	Región Norte A	2	—	1967, 1997	—
Regional (League)	Región I	2	—	2006, 2007	—
Regional (League)	Liga Departamental de Lambayeque	4	2	1966, 1986, 1997, 2007	2005, 2006
Regional (League)	Liga Superior de Lambayeque	1	—	2005	—
Regional (League)	Liga Distrital de Chiclayo	5	4	1939, 1966, 1986, 1996, 1997	1952, 1954, 1964, 1965

=== Friendlies ===
Type	Competition	Titles	Runner-up	Winning years	Runner-up years
National (Cup)	Copa El Gráfico-Perú	1	—	2001–II	—

=== Under-20 team ===
Type	Competition	Titles	Runner-up	Winning years	Runner-up years
National (League)	Torneo de Promoción y Reservas	1	1	2012	2011

== Performance in CONMEBOL competitions ==
- Copa Libertadores: 4 appearances

1969: Group Stage
2010: Group Stage
2012: Group Stage
2015: Group Stage

- Copa Sudamericana: 3 appearances

2011: First Stage
2013: First Stage
2017: First Stage

- Copa Ganadores de Copa: 1 appearance

1971: First Stage

== Notable players ==
Source consulted: De Chalaca

- (Peru) Willian Chiroque
- (Peru) Luis Guadalupe
- (Peru) José Guevara Tinoco
- (Peru) Julio Meléndez
- (Peru) Francisco Mendoza Pizarro
- (Peru) Próspero Merino
- (Peru) Johnny Mujica
- (Peru) Evert Negrete
- (Peru) Diego Penny
- (Peru) Eladio Reyes
- (Panama) Luis Tejada

== Notable managers ==
The following managers won at least one trophy when in charge of Juan Aurich or led the team to an important achievement.

Name	Period	Achievement
Vito Andrés Bártoli	1968–1969, 1974, 2002	Qualified to Copa Libertadores
Luis Sanjinez	1997	1 Copa Perú
Horacio Baldessari	2007	1 Copa Perú
Franco Navarro	2008–2009, 2012	Qualified to Copa Libertadores
Luis Fernando Suárez	2009–2010	Qualified to Copa Libertadores
Diego Umaña	2011–2012	1 Torneo Descentralizado
Roberto Mosquera	2013–2015	1 Torneo Apertura, qualified to Copa Libertadores

=== Other managers ===
- Juan Eduardo Hohberg (1982)
- Julio César Uribe (1998)
- Jorge Sampaoli (2002)
- Claudio Techera (2008)
- Julio César Balerio (2008)
- Juan Reynoso (2010)
- José Mari Bakero (2012–2013)
- José Soto (2019–2021)
