= 2012 Club Universitario de Deportes season =

Universitario de Deportes
2012 season
- President: Vacant
- Manager: Nolberto Solano
- Stadium: Estadio Monumental "U"
- Descentralizado: 11th
Home colours	Away colours

Universitario de Deportes' 2012 season is the club's 84th season in the Primera División of Peru and 47th in the Torneo Descentralizado. The club's under-20 team will compete in the 2012 U-20 Copa Libertadores as defending champions.

== Players ==
=== Squad information ===
N	Pos.	Nat.	Name	Age	Since	App	Goals	Ends	Transfer fee	Notes
2	DF	(Peru)	John Galliquio	46	2009	262	10		Youth system	
3	DF	(Peru)	Werner Schuler	36	2011			2012	Youth system	
4	MF	(Peru)	Álvaro Ampuero	34	2011	29	3		Youth system	
5	MF	(Peru)	Antonio Gonzáles	40	2006	159	0	2012	Youth system	
6	MF	(Peru)	Rainer Torres	46	2008		4			
7	MF	(Peru)	Miguel Angel Torres	44	2007				Youth system	
8		(Peru)	Christofer González		2012				Youth system	
9	FW	(Uruguay)	Miguel Ximénez	49	2012	18	14			
10	MF	(Argentina)	Horacio Calcaterra	36	2012	17	5			
11	MF	(Peru)	Carlos Olascuaga	20	2012					
12	GK	(Peru)	Luis Llontop	41	2008				Youth system	
13	MF	(Peru)	Edison Flores	32	2011	37	4		Youth system	
14	DF	(Peru)	Néstor Duarte	35	2007				Youth system	
15	MF	(Peru)	Josimar Vargas	36	2011				Youth system	
16	DF	(Peru)	Christian Dávila	36	2012				Youth system	
18	FW	(Peru)	Andy Polo	32	2011	41	8	2013	Youth system	
19		(Peru)	Diego Chávez	19	2012				Youth system	
20	MF	(Peru)	José Mendoza	44	2011				Youth system	
20	FW	(Peru)	Guillermo Tomasevich	39	2011			2012		Second nationality: Croatia
21	GK	(Peru)	Carlos Cáceda	35	2011			2012	Youth system	
23	MF	(Peru)	Juan Carlos La Rosa	46	2011					
24	DF	(Peru)	Aurelio Saco Vértiz	37	2011	16	1	2012		
25	MF	(Peru)	Ángel Romero	36	2010			2012	Youth system	
29	FW	(Peru)	Francesco Balbi	37	2012				Youth system	
	FW	(Peru)	Christian La Torre	36	2008			2012	Youth system	
	DF	(Peru)	Franco Otárola	34	2012			2012	Youth system	
	GK	(England)	Mark Cook	37	2012			2012	Youth system	

- Source: DeChalaca

=== In ===
Date	Pos.	Player	Moving from	Fee	Notes
1 January 2012	FW	(Peru) Christian La Torre	(Peru) Sport Boys	Return from loan	Previously on loan for 5 months
9 January 2012	FW	(Uruguay) Miguel Ximénez	(Peru) Sporting Cristal	Free	Signed a one-year contract
23 January 2012	MF	(Argentina) Horacio Calcaterra	(Peru) Unión Comercio	Free	
	MF	(Peru) Óscar Vega	(Peru) Léon de Huanúco	Free	
February 2012	MF	(Peru) Carlos Olascuaga	(Peru) Cienciano	Free	
July 2012	GK	(England) Mark Cook	(England) Harrogate Town	Free	

=== Out ===
Date	Pos.	Player	Moving to	Fee	Notes
14 December 2011	FW	(Peru) Johan Fano	(Colombia) Atlético Nacional	Undisclosed loan	On loan until December 2012
19 December 2011	MF	(Peru) Johan Vasquez	(Peru) León de Huánuco	Free	Contract rescinded by the FPF due to 7 months of unpaid wages
19 December 2011	MF	(Peru) Pedro García	(Peru) León de Huánuco	Free	Contract rescinded by the FPF due to 7 months of unpaid wages
28 December 2011	MF	(Argentina) Pablo Vitti	(Mexico) Querétaro	Free	Contract rescinded by the FPF due to 7 months of unpaid wages
1 January 2012	FW	(Peru) Joyce Conde	(Peru) César Vallejo		
1 January 2012	GK	(Peru) Carlos Solís	(Peru) Sport Huancayo		
2 January 2012	MF	(Argentina) Martín Morel	(Argentina) All Boys	Free	Contract rescinded by the FPF due to 7 months of unpaid wages
8 January 2012	DF	(Argentina) Carlos Galván	(Peru) César Vallejo	Free	
10 January 2012	MF	(Peru) Damián Ismodes	(Peru) Cienciano	End of loan spell	
20 January 2012	FW	(Peru) Raúl Ruidíaz	U. de Chile	Free	Contract rescinded by the FPF due to 7 months of unpaid wages
30 January 2012	DF	(Peru) Jesús Rabanal	(Peru) Alianza Lima	Free	
16 February 2012	MF	(Peru) Willyan Mimbela	(Brazil) Internacional	Free	Contract rescinded by the FPF due to 7 months of unpaid wages
January 2012	DF	(Peru) Víctor Balta	(Peru) FBC Melgar		
January 2012	FW	(Peru) Mario Soto			
January 2012	MF	(Peru) José Mendoza	(Peru) Sport Huancayo		
January 2012	MF	(Peru) Carlos Uribe	(Peru) César Vallejo		
January 2013	FW	(Peru) Andy Polo	(Italy) Genoa	1.5 Million	
January 2013	MF	(Peru) Alvaro Ampuero	(Italy) Parma		

== Competitions ==
Competition	Started round	Current position / round	Final position / round	First match	Last match
Torneo Descentralizado	—	12		19 February 2011	December 2011

Updated to match played 2 April
Source: Competitions

=== Torneo Descentralizado ===
The ADFP ruled that Universitario will play in the Estadio Monumental "U" behind closed doors for the first two home games of the 2012 season as punishment for the death of a supporter in the last Peruvian Clásico of the 2011 season.

==== Results summary ====
Overall								Home						Away					
Pld	W	D	L	GF	GA	GD	Pts	W	D	L	GF	GA	GD	W	D	L	GF	GA	GD
29	11	9	9	39	36	+3	41	8	4	3	26	18	+8	3	5	6	13	18	−5

Last updated: 8 August 2012.
Source: Matches

==== Results by round ====
Round	1	2	3	4	5	6	7	8	9	10	11	12	13	14	15	16	17	18	19	20	21	22	23	24	25	26	27	28	29	30
Ground	A	H	A	H	A	H	A	A	H	A	H	A	H	A	H	H	A	H	A	H	A	H	H	A	H	A	H	A	H	A
Result	L	D	D	D	L	W	D	L	W	L	L	L	L	L	W	W	W	L	D	W	D	D	W	D	W	W	D	W	W	D
Position	13	12	11	12	15	12	13	14	13	14	15	15	15	15	14	14	13	13	11	11	11	11	11	12	12	9	10	9	7	7

Updated to match(es) played on 14 July 2012. Source: Matches
A = Away; H = Home; W = Win; D = Draw; L = Loss

==== Matches ====
19 February Round 1	Inti Gas Deportes	1–0	Universitario de Deportes	Ayacucho
13:45	Coronado 90+1'	Report		Stadium: Estadio Ciudad de Cumaná; Attendance: 2,804; Referee: Miguel Santibañez

5 March Round 2	Universitario de Deportes	1–1	Cienciano	Lima
18:00	Ximénez 82'	Report	Elías 79'	Stadium: Estadio Monumental "U"; Attendance: Played behind closed doors Referee: Henry Gambetta

10 March Round 3	Sporting Cristal	1–1	Universitario de Deportes	Lima
19:45	Rengifo 57'	Report	Chirinos 80'	Stadium: Estadio Nacional; Attendance: 34,529; Referee: Manuel Garay

16 March Round 4	Universitario de Deportes	0–0	José Gálvez	Lima
18:00		Report		Stadium: Estadio Monumental "U"; Attendance: Played behind closed doors Referee: Roberto Mauro

25 March Round 5	Juan Aurich	1–0	Universitario de Deportes	Chiclayo
18:00	Valencia 66'	Report		Stadium: Estadio Elías Aguirre; Attendance: 7,067; Referee: Miguel Santivañez

1 April Round 6	Universitario de Deportes	3–2	Cobresol	Lima
18:00				Stadium: Estadio Monumental "U"; Attendance: 23,635; Referee: Diego Haro

7 April Round 7	Sport Boys	1–1	Universitario de Deportes	Callao
17:-45	Rossel		Ximénez	Stadium: Estadio Miguel Grau; Referee: Henry Gambetta

15 April Round 8	Alianza Lima	1–0	Universitario de Deportes	Lima
23:35	González (yellow card) 30'; Fernández 32' (yellow card) 33'; Quinteros (yellow card) 52'; Carmona (yellow card) 57'; Rabanal (yellow card) 67'; Carlos Ascues (red card) 72'	Summary	Gonzales (yellow card) 6'; Horacio Calcaterra (yellow card) 76'	Stadium: Estadio Nacional; Attendance: 37,270; Referee: Victor Rivera

22 April Round 9	Universitario de Deportes	2–1	León de Huánuco	Lima
02:00	Galliquio (yellow card) 37'; Chávez (yellow card) 43'; Flores 45'; Horacio Calcaterra 46'; Ampuero (yellow card) 56'	Summary	Zegarra (yellow card) 19'; Lojas (yellow card) 32' (goal) 87'; Araujo (yellow card) 48'; Renato Zapata (yellow card) 50'; Ever Chávez (yellow card) 53'; Garcia (yellow card) 83'	Stadium: Estadio Monumental "U"; Attendance: 6,730; Referee: Miguel Santiváñez

28 April Round 10	Real Garcilaso	2–1	Universitario de Deportes	Cusco
19:15	Andy Pando 24'; Herrera (yellow card) 65'; Emiliano Ciucci 71'; Ricardo Uribe (yellow card) 83'	Report	Ampuero (yellow card) 51'; Horacio Calcaterra 59'	Stadium: Estadio Garcilaso; Attendance: 8,607; Referee: Henry Gambetta

2 May Round 11	Universitario de Deportes	1–2	Universidad San Martín	Lima
19:05	Ampuero 31' (yellow card) 63'; Horacio Calcaterra (yellow card) 54'; Llontop (yellow card) 71'; Ximénez (red card) 90+3'	Report	Céspedes (yellow card) 26'; Quinteros (yellow card) 44'; Ramos 78', 90'; Carlos Fernández (yellow card) 82'	Stadium: Estadio Monumental "U"; Attendance: 18,997; Referee: Georges Buckley

7 May Round 12	Universidad César Vallejo	2–0	Universitario de Deportes	Trujillo
19:05	Solis (yellow card) 25'; Velásquez 44', 69'; Christian Pabón (yellow card) 65'; Tenemás (yellow card) 76'; Paolo de La Haza (yellow card) 88'	Report	Gonzales (yellow card) 34' (yellow-red card) 67'	Stadium: Estadio Mansiche; Attendance: 17,162; Referee: Yonani Quevedo

12 May Round 13	Universitario de Deportes	1–3	Unión Comercio	Lima
19:30	Horacio Calcaterra 13'; Galliquio (yellow card) 21'	Report	Alex Sinisterra (yellow card) 19'; Luis García Uribe 29' (yellow card) 59'; Braham Maldonado (yellow card) 55'; Olcese 69'; Céliz 90+3'	Stadium: Estadio Monumental "U"; Attendance: 4,927; Referee: Ivan Chang

19 May Round 14	FBC Melgar	3–1	Universitario de Deportes	Arequipa
19:00	García 3'; Karlo Calcina (yellow card) 30'; Antonio Meza Cuadra 45+1'; Manuel Contreras 83'	Report	Galliquio (yellow card) 32'; Flores 40'; Ximénez (yellow card) 43'; Juan Carlos La Rosa (yellow card) 50'; Duarte (yellow card) 71'	Stadium: Estadio Monumental Virgen de Chapi; Attendance: 16,984; Referee: Miguel Santiváñez

27 May Round 15	Universitario de Deportes	3–1	Sport Huancayo	Lima
19:00	Cristian Dávila (yellow card) 12'; Anier Figueroa 28' (o.g.); Patricio Álvarez (yellow card) 33'; Ximénez 37' (pen.); Juan Carlos La Rosa (yellow card) 40'; Torres 54'; Duarte (yellow card) 73'	Report	César Zambrano (yellow card) 23' (yellow-red card) 30'; Ibarra (yellow card) 36'; Luis Hernández Díaz (yellow card) 36'; Angelo Cruzado (yellow card) 57' (goal) 69' (pen.)	Stadium: Estadio Monumental "U"; Referee: Victor Carrillo

16 June Round 16	Universitario de Deportes	3–1	Inti Gas Deportes	Lima
--:--				Stadium: Estadio Monumental "U"

23 June Round 17	Cienciano	2–3	Universitario de Deportes	Cusco
11:00				Stadium: Estadio Garcilaso; Referee: Georges Buckley

28 June Round 18	Universitario de Deportes	0–2	Sporting Cristal	Lima
20:30			Saco Vértiz 34' (og); Ross 76'	Stadium: Estadio Nacional

1 July 2012 Round 19	José Gálvez	1–1	Universitario de Deportes	Chimbote
21:35 PET	Barrena (yellow card) 66'; José Mesarina 82'	Report	Galliquio (yellow card) 28' (yellow-red card) 86'; Ximénez 65'; Schuler (yellow card) 81'	Stadium: Estadio Manuel Rivera Sanchez; Attendance: 10,416; Referee: Luis Garay Evia

4 July 2012 Round 20	Universitario de Deportes	3–1	Juan Aurich	Lima
20:30 PET	Flores (yellow card) 26'; Ximénez 41', 54', 73'; Chávez (yellow card) 67'; Horacio Calcaterra (yellow card) 79'	Report	Fleitas 40'	Stadium: Estadio Monumental "U"; Attendance: 4,846; Referee: Manuel Garay

7 July 2012 Round 21	Cobresol	1–1	Universitario de Deportes	Moquegua
14:00 PET	Juan Francisco Hernández 61'; Edward Campos (yellow card) 62'	Report	Josimar Vargas (yellow card) 30'; Flores 70'	Stadium: Estadio 25 de Noviembre; Attendance: 3,454; Referee: Eduardo Chirinos

10 July 2012 Round 22	Universitario de Deportes	1–1	Sport Boys	Lima
18:45	Cristian Dávila (yellow card) 42'; Polo 85'	Report	Jesús Arismendi (yellow card) 35'; Ruiz 51'; Fischer Guevara (yellow card) 79'; Parra (yellow card) 90'	Stadium: Estadio Monumental "U"; Attendance: 5,937; Referee: Victor Carrillo

14 July 2012 Round 23	Universitario de Deportes	2–1	Alianza Lima	Lima
17:03	Galliquio (yellow card) 19'; Saco Vértiz 27' (yellow card) 29'; Gonzales (yellow card) 64'; Flores 65'	Report	Viza (yellow card) 33'; Rabanal (yellow card) 38'; Paulo Albarracín 46'; Carlos Beltrán (yellow card) 54'	Stadium: Estadio Monumental "U"; Attendance: 29,242; Referee: Henry Gambetta

18 July 2012 Round 24	León de Huánuco	0–0	Universitario de Deportes	Huánuco
16:15				Stadium: Estadio Heraclio Tapia

21 July 2012 Round 25	Universitario de Deportes	2–1	Real Garcilaso	Lima
--:--	Ximénez 20' (pen.), 65'		Pando 32'	Stadium: Estadio Monumental "U"

Round 26	Universidad San Martín	0–1	Universitario de Deportes	Callao
--:--			Galliquio 42'	Stadium: Estadio Miguel Grau

28 July 2012 Round 27	Universitario de Deportes	1–1	Universidad César Vallejo	Lima
--:--	Ximénez 72'		Aponte 80'	Stadium: Estadio Monumental "U"

5 August 2012 Round 28	Unión Comercio	2–3	Universitario de Deportes	Tarapoto
--:--	Andonaire 17'; Garcia 63'		Rainer Torres 41'; Ximénez 63' 72'

8 August 2012 Round 29	Universitario de Deportes	3–0	FBC Melgar	Lima
19:00	Galliquio 37'; Ximénez 57'; Torres 71'			Stadium: Estadio Monumental "U"

11 August 2012 Round 30	Sport Huancayo	1–1	Universitario de Deportes	Huancayo
21:00	Sergio Ibarra 68'		Aurelio Saco Vértiz 32'	Stadium: Estadio Huancayo

=== U-20 Copa Libertadores ===
==== Group stage ====
Pos	Team	Pld	W	D	L	GF	GA	GD	Pts
1	(Chile) Unión Española	3	2	1	0	8	4	+4	7
2	(Peru) Universitario	3	2	0	1	7	6	+1	6
3	(Mexico) América	3	1	1	1	6	4	+2	4
4	(Venezuela) Real Esppor	3	0	0	3	1	8	−7	0

Matches

15 June 2012	Universitario (Peru)	2–0	(Venezuela) Real Esppor	Estadio Monumental, Lima
20:30	López 2'; Bejarano 70'	Report		Referee: Sandro Ricci

17 June 2012	Universitario (Peru)	2–4	(Chile) Union Española	Estadio Monumental, Lima
18:30	Camino 60'; Arnillas 40'	Report	36' Gattas; 51', 77' Bustos; 68' (o.g.) Otarola	Referee: Ulises Mereles

21 June 2012	Universitario (Peru)	3–2	(Mexico) America	Estadio Monumental, Lima
20:30	Tajima 16'; Rey 21'; Bejarano 80'	Report	39', 47' (pen.) Zúñiga

==== Quarterfinals ====
25 June 2012	Universitario (Peru)	0–0 (2–4 p)	(Uruguay) Defensor Sporting	Estadio Monumental "U", Lima
20:15		Report
	Penalties
	Goyoneche (penalty scored); Arnillas (penalty missed); Lopez (penalty scored); Gonzales (penalty missed)		(penalty scored) Malvino; (penalty scored) Zeballos; (penalty scored) Gutierrez; (penalty scored) Foliados

== Goal scorers ==
Player	Goals
(Uruguay) Miguel Ximénez	15
(Argentina) Horacio Calcaterra	5
(Peru) Edison Flores	4
(Peru) Rainer Torres	4
(Peru) Andy Polo	3
(Peru) Jankarlo Chirinos	2
(Peru) Aurelio Saco Vértiz	2
(Peru) John Galliquio	2
(Peru) Álvaro Ampuero	1
(Peru) Miguel Angel Torres	1

=== Assists table ===
Player	Assists
(Peru) Álvaro Ampuero	5
(Argentina) Horacio Calcaterra	5
(Peru) Edison Flores	5
(Peru) Rainer Torres	3
(Peru) Aurelio Saco Vértiz	2
(Peru) Carlos Olascuaga	1
(Peru) Antonio Gonzales	1
(Peru) Miguel Angel Torres	1
(Peru) John Galliquio	1
(Peru) Jankarlo Chirinos	1
(Peru) Werner Schuler	1
(Peru) Andy Polo	1
(Peru) Christofer González	1
