= 2011 Club Universitario de Deportes season =

Universitario de Deportes
2011 season
- President: Julio Pacheco
- Manager: José del Solar
- Stadium: Estadio Monumental "U"
- Descentralizado: 14th
- Torneo Intermedio: First round
- Copa Sudamericana: Quarterfinals
- Top goalscorer: League: Fano (10); All: Fano (12)
Home colours	Away colours

Universitario de Deportes' 2011 season is the club's 83rd season in the Primera División of Peru and 46th in the Torneo Descentralizado. They will participate in their 5th season in the Copa Sudamericana.

== Club information ==
=== Board of directors ===
Julio Pacheco Torres	President
Edmundo Guinea Luyer	First vice-president
Luis Cruzado Sánchez	Second vice-president
Julio Álvarez Giraldo	Treasurer
Luis Gonzáles Álvarez	Pro Treasurer
Anibal Saco Ortega	Secretary
Javier Seminario Castillo	Pro Secretary

Marco Paredes Gálvez	Director
Aurelio Salinas Acosta	Director
Johnny Fernández Canchanga	Director
Guillermo Rodriguez Sánchez	Director
Carlos Landa Romero	Director
Manuel Sánchez Carranza	Director
Javier Jorge Morzan Camere	Director

=== Coaching staff ===
José del Solar	Manager
Marcelo Asteggiano	First assistant
José Luis Carranza	Second assistant
Héctor Chumpitaz	Third assistant
Alejandro Richino	Physical fitness assistant

== Squad information ==
As of 4 June 2011 Note: Flags indicate national team as defined under FIFA eligibility rules; some limited exceptions apply. Players may hold more than one non-FIFA nationality.

No.	Pos.	Nation	Player
2	DF	PER	John Galliquio
3	DF	ARG	Carlos Galván (captain)
4	MF	PER	Álvaro Ampuero
5	MF	PER	Antonio Gonzalez
6	MF	PER	Rainer Torres
7	MF	PER	Miguel Torres
8	MF	ARG	Martín Morel
9	FW	PER	Raúl Ruidíaz
10	MF	PER	Mario Soto
11	FW	PER	Damián Ísmodes
12	GK	PER	Luis Llontop
14	DF	PER	Néstor Duarte
15	MF	PER	Johan Vásquez
16	FW	PER	Pedro García

No.	Pos.	Nation	Player
17	FW	PER	Johan Fano
18	FW	PER	Guillermo Tomasevich
19	DF	PER	Jesús Rabanal
20	MF	PER	José Mendoza
21	GK	PER	Carlos Cáceda
24	DF	PER	Aurelio Saco-Vértiz
25	MF	PER	Ángel Romero
26	DF	PER	Víctor Balta
28	FW	PER	Andy Polo
29	MF	PER	Willyan Mimbela
30	MF	ARG	Pablo Vitti
—	DF	PER	Werner Schuler
—	DF	PER	Edison Flores

=== Transfers ===
==== In ====
Pos	Player	Age	Moving from	Transfer window	Notes
GK	(Peru) Carlos Cáceda	19	Youth team	Summer	
GK	(Peru) Raúl Fernández	25	(France) Nice	Summer	Loan
DF	(Chile) Cristián Álvarez	31	(Israel) Beitar Jerusalem	Summer	
DF	(Peru) Víctor Balta	25	Juan Aurich	Summer	
DF	(Peru) Edgardo Becerra	20	United States	Summer	Free agent
MF	(Peru) Pedro García	37	Universidad San Martín	Summer	
MF	(Peru) José Mendoza	28	Inti Gas Deportes	Summer	
MF	(Peru) Guillermo Tomasevich	24	Cienciano	Summer	
MF	(Argentina) Pablo Vitti	25	Universidad San Martín	Summer	
MF	(Peru) Damián Ísmodes	22	(Spain) Racing de Santander	Summer	Loan
MF	(Argentina) Martín Morel	30	(Colombia) Deportivo Cali	Summer	
FW	(Peru) Johan Fano	32	(Mexico) Atlante	Summer	
FW	(Peru) Andy Polo	16	Youth team	Summer	

==== Out ====
Pos	Player	Age	Moving to	Transfer window	Notes
GK	(Peru) Renzo Lobrano	21	León de Huánuco	Summer	
DF	(Peru) Adrián Zela	22		Summer	
MF	(Peru) Luis Hernández	30	Cobresol	Summer	
MF	(Peru) Luis Ramírez	26	(Brazil) Corinthians	Summer	
MF	(Peru) Giancarlo Carmona	25	(Argentina) San Lorenzo	Summer	
FW	(Peru) Gianfranco Labarthe	26	Universidad San Martín	Summer	
FW	(Peru) Carlos Orejuela	31	León de Huánuco	Summer	
FW	(Uruguay) Víctor Píriz	31	(Argentina) Defensa y Justicia	Summer	
FW	(Argentina) Darío Gigena	33	(Brazil) Ponte Preta	Summer	
FW	(Peru) Piero Alva	32	Sporting Cristal	Winter	
DF	(Chile) Cristián Álvarez	31	(Chile) Universidad Católica	Winter	
DF	(Peru) Renzo Revoredo		Sporting Cristal	Winter	
GK	(Peru) Raúl Fernández	26	(France) Nice	Winter	End of Loan

== Competitions ==
Competition	Started round	Current position / round	Final position / round	First match	Last match
Torneo Descentralizado	—	—	14th	12 February 2011	27 November 2011
Torneo Intermedio	First round	—	First round	28 May 2011	28 May 2011
Copa Sudamericana	Second Stage	—	Quarterfinals	1 September 2011	9 November 2011
U-20 Copa Libertadores	Group stage	—	Champion	10 June 2011	26 June 2011

Updated to match played 29 August
Source: Competitions

=== Pre-season ===
2 February 2011 Copa Crema	Universitario	1–0	(Argentina) Arsenal	Estadio Monumental, Lima, Peru
	Álvarez 65'			Referee: Henry Gambetta

4 February 2011 Copa Crema	Universitario	1–1	(Colombia) América	Estadio Monumental, Lima, Peru
	Ruidíaz 76'		Artigas 34'	Referee: Manuel Garay

6 February 2011 Pre-season match	Universitario	0–0	Colegio Nacional Iquitos	Estadio Max Augustín, Iquitos, Peru
				Attendance: 8,000; Referee: Albert Caballero

=== Torneo Descentralizado ===
==== League table ====
Pos	Team	Pld	W	D	L	GF	GA	GD	Pts	Qualification or relegation
12	Melgar	30	9	7	14	37	44	−7	34	
13	Universidad César Vallejo	30	9	7	14	32	42	−10	34	
14	Universitario	30	8	10	12	25	35	−10	34	
15	Alianza Atlético (R)	30	10	3	17	24	41	−17	33	2012 Segunda División
16	CNI (R)	30	9	6	15	35	44	−9	30 (Note: Colegio Nacional Iquitos were deducted 3 points for maintaining debts with 3 former players.)	2012 Segunda División

Updated to match(es) played on 21 November 2011. Source: Soccerway
Rules for classification: 1) points; 2) goal difference; 3) number of goals scored; 4) head-to-head record.
(R) Relegated

==== Matches ====
Kick off times are in UTC-5.

12 February 2011 Round 1	Universitario	0 – 0	Juan Aurich	Lima
19:00	Fano (yellow card) 49'	Report	(yellow card) 13' Ciciliano; (yellow card) 86' Uribe; (yellow card) 90+2' Guadalupe	Stadium: Estadio Monumental; Attendance: 15,308; Referee: Manuel Garay

19 February 2011 Round 2	Colegio Nacional Iquitos	1 – 1	Universitario	Iquitos
16:00	Portilla (yellow card) 43'; Huertas (yellow card) 53'; Celis 83' (pen.); Zamora (red card) 89'	Report	(yellow card) 8' Gonzales; 12' (pen.) Fano; (red card) 15' Revoredo; (yellow card) 35' (yellow-red card) 41' Fano; (yellow card) 73' Alva; (yellow card) 84' Torres	Stadium: Estadio Max Augustín; Attendance: 7,520; Referee: Diego Haro

25 February 2011 Round 3	Universitario	1 – 0	Universidad San Martín de Porres	Lima
19:30	Álvarez (yellow card) 31'; Duarte (yellow card) 52'; Ruidíaz 57'; Romero (yellow card) 78'	Report	(yellow card) 63' Guizasola; (red card) 63' Marinelli	Stadium: Estadio Monumental; Attendance: 11,349; Referee: Henry Gambetta

7 March 2011 Round 4	León de Huánuco	2 – 0	Universitario	Huánuco
15:30	Revoredo 7' (o.g.); Flores (yellow card) 17'; González-Vigil 23'; Cardoza (yellow card) 40'; González-Vigil (yellow card) 67'; Peña 88'; Espinoza (yellow card) 90'	Report	(yellow card) 17' Alva; (yellow card) 35' Álvarez	Stadium: Estadio Heraclio Tapia; Attendance: 6,026; Referee: Victor Hugo Rivera

12 March 2011 Round 5	Universitario	2 – 1	Sport Huancayo	Lima
19:30	Fano 52'; Morel (yellow card) 59'; Ruidíaz 68'; Gonzales (red card) 82'	Report	21' Ávila; (yellow card) 40' Angulo; (yellow card) 70' Sotil; (yellow card) 78' Delgado; (red card) 82' Salas	Stadium: Estadio Monumental; Attendance: 12,953; Referee: Miguel Santiváñez

19 March 2011 Round 6	FBC Melgar	0 – 0	Universitario	Arequipa
20:15	Meza Cuadra (yellow card) 66'	Report	(yellow card) 47' Galliquio; (yellow card) 80' Fano	Stadium: Estadio Virgen de Chapi; Attendance: 12,509; Referee: Georges Buckley

2 April 2011 Round 7	Universitario	2 – 1	Sport Boys	Lima
19:30	García 90+1'; Álvarez 90+3' (yellow card) 90+3'	Report	70' Gárate; (yellow card) 90' Gomez; (yellow card) 90' Guevara	Stadium: Estadio Monumental; Attendance: 9,992; Referee: Albert Caballero

16 April 2011 Round 8	Alianza Lima	0 – 0	Universitario	Lima
15:00	González (yellow card) 26'; Prado (yellow card) 56'; Fleitas (yellow card) 81'	Report	(yellow card) 29' Gonzáles; (yellow card) 60' Galliquio; (yellow card) 84' Revoredo	Stadium: Estadio Alejandro Villanueva; Attendance: 28,975; Referee: Víctor Hugo Carrillo

23 April 2011 Round 9	Universitario	1 – 0	Alianza Atlético	Lima
19:30	Vitti 33'	Report		Stadium: Estadio Monumental; Referee: Víctor Hugo Rivera

1 May 2011 Round 10	Sporting Cristal	3 – 0 (Note: Following the end of the match, Sporting Cristal disputed the match result after Universitario failed to submit records to the ADFP of their players' monthly salaries prior to the match. The ADFP and Peruvian Football Federation ruled in favor of Cristal and the original 0–0 match result was nullified and declared a 3–0 loss for Universitario.)	Universitario	Lima
14:30	~~Palacios (yellow card) 76'~~	Report		Stadium: Estadio San Martín de Porres; Referee: Manuel Garay

6 May 2011 Round 11	Universitario	5 – 0	Cienciano	Callao
19:30	Polo 8'; Fano 20', 84'; Alva 30', 64'	Report		Stadium: Estadio Miguel Grau; Referee: Iván Chang

12 May 2011 Round 12	Inti Gas Deportes	0 – 0	Universitario	Ayacucho
13:30		Report		Stadium: Estadio Ciudad de Cumaná; Referee: Henry Gambetta

15 May 2011 Round 13	Universitario	0 – 1	Cobresol	Lima
18:15		Report	87' Caicedo	Stadium: Estadio Monumental; Referee: Roberto Mauro

18 May 2011 Round 14	Universidad César Vallejo	0 – 0	Universitario	Trujillo
20:00		Report		Stadium: Estadio Mansiche; Referee: Freddy Arellanos

21 May 2011 Round 15	Universitario	3 – 0	Unión Comercio	Lima
15:30	Polo 3'; Fano 66', 70'	Report		Stadium: Estadio Monumental; Referee: Manuel Garay

31 July 2011 Round 16	Juan Aurich	1 – 0	Universitario	Chiclayo
16:00	Quina (yellow card) 38'; Tejada 78'; Ciciliano (yellow card) 86'	Report	(yellow card) 17' Galván; (yellow card) 72' Galliquio; (yellow card) 86' Fano	Stadium: Estadio Elías Aguirre; Attendance: 11,680; Referee: Henry Gambetta

6 August 2011 Round 17	Universitario	0 – 3 (Note: Following the end of the match, CNI disputed the match result after Universitario failed to submit records to the ADFP of their players' monthly salaries prior to the match. The ADFP and Peruvian Football Federation ruled in favor of CNI and the original 2–0 win for Universitario was nullified and declared a 3–0 win for CNI.)	Colegio Nacional Iquitos	Lima
19:00	~~Gonzales (yellow card) 45+1'~~; ~~Polo 50'~~; ~~Galliquio (yellow card) 56'~~; ~~Morel (yellow card) 80'~~; ~~Ísmodes 88'~~	Report	~~(yellow card) 22' Campos~~; ~~(yellow card) 66' Zamora~~; ~~(yellow card) 68' Carrillo~~	Stadium: Estadio Monumental; Attendance: 3,465; Referee: Victor Hugo Carrillo

14 August 2011 Round 18	Universidad San Martín de Porres	0 – 0	Universitario	Callao
15:00		Report		Stadium: Estadio Miguel Grau; Attendance: 4,032; Referee: Manuel Garay

20 August 2011 Round 19	Universitario	2 – 1	León de Huánuco	Lima
19:00	Rabanal (yellow card) 37'; Ruidíaz 57'; Fano 76'; Fano (yellow card) 81'	Report	14' Cambindo; (yellow card) 15' Leiva; (yellow card) 37' Espinoza; (yellow card) 50' Cevasco; (yellow card) 77' Salas; (yellow card) 90' Luis Cardoza	Stadium: Estadio Monumental; Attendance: 3,684; Referee: Víctor Hugo Rivera

28 August 2011 Round 20	Sport Huancayo	1 – 0	Universitario	Huancayo
13:00	Ortiz (yellow card) 30'; Peréz 73'	Report	(yellow card) 16' Llontop	Stadium: Estadio Huancayo; Attendance: 6,916; Referee: Georges Buckley

10 September 2011 Round 21	Universitario	0 – 3 (Note: Universitario failed to make a payment due to Agremiación (union representing professional footballers) and were unable to dispute the match against FBC Melgar. Melgar was awarded a 3–0 victory)	FBC Melgar	Lima
--:--		[Report]		Stadium: Estadio Monumental

17 September 2011 Round 22	Sport Boys	2 – 0	Universitario	Callao
15:30	Alloco 33'; Baylón 80'	Report		Stadium: Estadio Miguel Grau; Attendance: 7,149; Referee: Henry Gambetta

24 September 2011 Round 23	Universitario	2 – 1	Alianza Lima	Lima
17:30	Vitti 26'; Morel 90+1'	Report	40' (pen.) Ovelar	Stadium: Estadio Monumental; Attendance: 24,301; Referee: Manuel Garay

17 October 2011 Round 24	Alianza Atlético	3 – 0 (Note: Following the end of the match, Alianza Atlético disputed the match result after Universitario failed to submit records to the ADFP of their players' monthly salaries prior to the match. The ADFP and Peruvian Football Federation ruled in favor of Alianza Atlético and the original 0–0 match result was nullified and declared a 3–0 loss for Universitario.)	Universitario	Piura
17:00	~~Carabili (yellow card) 11' (yellow-red card) 32'~~; ~~Camarino (yellow card) 35'~~	Report	~~(yellow card) 11' Fano~~; ~~(yellow card) 40' Flores~~	Stadium: Estadio Miguel Grau; Attendance: 3,430; Referee: Georges Buckley

23 October 2011 Round 25	Universitario	1 – 2	Sporting Cristal	Callao
19:15	Galliquo 17'; Galliquo (yellow card) 37'; Vitti (yellow card) 87'; Rabanal (yellow card) 87'	Report	(yellow card) 24' Carranza; (yellow card) 27' Shoro; 35', 42' Shoro; (yellow card) 74' Quina	Stadium: Estadio Miguel Grau; Referee: Víctor Hugo Carrillo

30 October 2011 Round 26	Cienciano	3 – 0	Universitario	Cusco
13:20	Mariño 13'; García 54'; Ibarra 70'; García (yellow card) 87'	Report	(yellow card) 37' Carranza	Stadium: Estadio Garcilaso; Attendance: 11,445; Referee: Alberto Lozano

5 November 2011 Round 27	Universitario	0 – 0	Inti Gas Deportes	Callao
15:30	Romero (yellow card) 47'; Soto (yellow card) 65'	Report	(yellow card) 12' Ibarra; (yellow card) 71' Cruzado	Stadium: Estadio Miguel Grau; Attendance: 505; Referee: Miguel Santivañez

19 November 2011 Round 28	Cobresol	1 – 1	Universitario	Moquegua
15:15	Ubillús (yellow card) 27'; Mina Polo 35'; Rojas (yellow card) 77'	Report	10' Fano; (yellow card) 56' Fano	Stadium: Estadio 25 de Noviembre; Attendance: 4,330; Referee: Georges Buckley

27 November 2011 Round 29	Universitario	2 – 2	Universidad César Vallejo	Lima
15:30	Polo 21'; Fano (yellow card) 38'; Fano 69'; Rabanal (yellow card) 85'	Report	(yellow card) 1' Sanchez; 13' Demus; (yellow card) 65' Cazulo; (yellow card) 76' de Castro; (yellow card) 84'Nakaya; 90+2' Aponte	Stadium: Estadio Nacional; Attendance: 24,500; Referee: Víctor Hugo Rivera

4 December 2011 Round 30	Unión Comercio	3 – 2	Universitario	Moyobamba
15:30	Jiménez 33'; Sinisterra 37', 51'	Report	18' Ampuero; (yellow card) 57' Mendoza; 62' Fano; (yellow card) 86' Fano	Stadium: IPD Moyobamba; Attendance: 4,215; Referee: Iván Chang

=== Torneo Intermedio ===
28 May 2011 First round	Sport Áncash	3–2	Universitario	Estadio Rosas Pampa, Huaraz
20:30 UTC-5	Eíner Vásquez 8'; Lionel Alguedas 22'; Fabricio Lenci 63'	Report	Saco-Vértiz 53'; Mendoza 70'	Referee: Iván Chang

=== U-20 Copa Libertadores ===
Kick off times are in UTC-5.

==== Group A ====
Pos	Team	Pld	W	D	L	GF	GA	GD	Pts
1	(Uruguay) Nacional	3	2	1	0	4	1	+3	7
2	(Peru) Universitario	3	1	1	1	2	4	−2	4
3	(Paraguay) Libertad	3	1	0	2	4	3	+1	3
4	(Bolivia) Jorge Wilstermann	3	1	0	2	2	4	−2	3

10 June 2011	Universitario (Peru)	1 – 0	(Bolivia) Jorge Wilstermann	Estadio Monumental, Lima
20:10	Polo 58'

13 June 2011	Universitario (Peru)	1 – 4	(Paraguay) Libertad	Estadio Monumental, Lima
20:10	Polo 31'		Caballero 16' 64'; Oscar Ruiz 80' 90+4'

16 June 2011	Universitario (Peru)	0 – 0	(Uruguay) Nacional	Estadio Monumental, Lima
20:10

==== Quarterfinals ====
21 June 2011	Universitario (Peru)	3–0	(Ecuador) Independiente José Terán	Estadio Monumental, Lima
15:00	La Torre 84'; Polo 85'; Mimbela 88'

==== Semifinals ====
23 June 2011	Universitario (Peru)	0 – 0 (5–4 p)	(Peru) Alianza Lima	Estadio Monumental, Lima
20:00				Attendance: 40,000; Referee: Alfredo Intriago (Ecuador)
	Penalties
	Franco (penalty scored); Ampuero (penalty scored); Polo (penalty missed); López (penalty scored); La Torre (penalty scored); Romero (penalty scored)		(penalty missed) Hurtado; (penalty scored) Soto; (penalty scored) Trujillo; (penalty scored) Ascues; (penalty scored) Hinostroza; (penalty missed) Bazán

==== Final ====
26 June 2011	Universitario (Peru)	1 – 1 (4–2 p)	(Argentina) Boca Juniors	Estadio Monumental, Lima
16:00	Ampuero 24'		Rossi 48'	Attendance: 40,000; Referee: Leandro Vuaden (Brazil)
	Penalties
	Franco (penalty scored); Ampuero (penalty scored); Romero (penalty scored); López (penalty scored)		(penalty missed) Unrein; (penalty scored) Imbert; (penalty missed) Achucarro; (penalty scored) Flores

=== Copa Sudamericana ===
==== Second stage ====
1 September 2011 First leg	Deportivo Anzoátegui (Venezuela)	1 – 2	(Peru) Universitario	Estadio José A. Anzoátegui, Puerto La Cruz
20:45	Maita 75'	[Report]	Ampuero 29'; Fano 49'

14 September 2011 Second leg	Universitario (Peru)	2 – 0 (4 – 1 agg.)	(Venezuela) Deportivo Anzoátegui	Estadio Monumental, Lima
17:15	74' Ruidíaz; 80' Vitti	[Report]

==== Round of 16 ====
29 September 2011 First leg	Godoy Cruz (Argentina)	1 – 1	(Peru) Universitario	Estadio Malvinas Argentinas, Mendoza
19:15	Damonte (yellow card) 85'; Cabrera 88'; Sigali (yellow card) 89'	Report	(yellow card) 39' Llontop; (yellow card) 49' Gonzales; (yellow card) 85' Mendoza; 80' Ruidíaz	Referee: Antonio Arías

20 October 2011 Second leg	Universitario (Peru)	1 – 1 (3–2 p)	(Argentina) Godoy Cruz	Estadio Miguel Grau, Callao
19:45	Galliquio (yellow card) 72'; Gonzales (yellow card) 75'; Morel (yellow card) 82'; Polo 84'	Report	(yellow card) 33' Damonte; 44' Damonte; (yellow card) 72' Ramírez; (yellow card) 84' Russo; (yellow card) 87' Olmedo; (yellow card) 90' Caruso	Referee: Wilmar Roldán
	Penalties
	Galván (penalty scored); Morel (penalty missed); Vitti (penalty missed); Ruidíaz (penalty scored); Rabanal (penalty scored)		(penalty scored) Caruso; (penalty scored) Curbelo; (penalty missed) Rojas; (penalty missed) Sánchez; (penalty missed) Damonte
Note: Match was not played at Universitario's home ground because stadium did not have appropriate license to host matches.

==== Quarterfinals ====
2 November 2011	Universitario (Peru)	2 – 0	(Brazil) Vasco da Gama	Estadio Nacional, Lima
18:50 UTC−05:00	Rabanal (yellow card) 28'; Ruidíaz 36'; Pablo Vitti (yellow card) 43'; Fano 58'	Report	Bernardo (yellow card) 45'; Leandro (yellow card) 69'; Nílton (yellow card) 73'; Bastos (yellow card) 87'	Referee: Carlos Vera

9 November 2011	Vasco da Gama (Brazil)	5 – 2 (5 – 4 agg.)	(Peru) Universitario	Estádio São Januário, Rio de Janeiro
21:50 UTC−02:00		Report

=== Other friendlies ===
Kick off times are in UTC-5.

24 March 2011	Universitario	3 – 1	Deportivo Coopsol	Estadio Monumental, Lima, Peru
--:--	Gálvan; Fano; Johan Rey		Rodrigo Saraz

9 July 2011	Atlético Grau	1 – 1	Universitario	Estadio Miguel Grau, Piura, Peru
--:--	Barrueto		Morel 88'

15 July 2011 Copa Depor	Universitario	0 – 0	Alianza Lima	Estadio Monumental, Lima, Peru
--:--		Report

== Squad statistics ==
=== Goalscorers ===
Player	Descentralizado	Intermedio	Sudamericana	U-20 Libertadores	Friendlies	Total
(Peru) Johan Fano	10	0	2	–	1	13
(Peru) Raúl Ruidíaz	3	0	4	–	1	8
(Peru) Andy Polo	3	0	1	3	0	7
(Peru) Álvaro Ampuero	1	0	1	1	0	3
(Argentina) Pablo Vitti	2	0	1	–	0	3
(Chile) Cristián Álvarez	1	0	0	–	1	2
(Peru) Piero Alva	2	0	0	–	0	2
(Argentina) Martín Morel	1	0	0	0	1	2
(Peru) Pedro García	1	0	0	–	0	1
(Peru) Aurelio Saco-Vértiz	0	1	0	–	0	1
(Peru) José Mendoza	0	1	0	–	0	1
(Argentina) Carlos Galván	0	0	0	–	1	1
(Peru) Johan Rey	0	0	0	0	1	1
(Peru) Christian La Torre	0	0	0	1	0	1
(Peru) Willyan Mimbela	0	0	0	1	0	1
(Peru) John Galliquio	1	0	0	1	0	1
(Peru) Jesús Rabanal	0	0	1	0	0	1

== Miscellaneous ==
- The U-20 Copa Libertadores became the club's first international title.
