= Colegio de la Inmaculada (Lima) =

Private primary and secondary school in Lima, Peru

Location
- Calle Hno. Santos García 108, Valle Hermoso, Surco (Lima); Santiago de Surco, Lima; Peru; 11°58′15″S 77°0′23″W

Information
- Type: Private primary and secondary school
- Motto: Latin: Ad maiorem Dei gloriam (For the greater glory of God)
- Religious affiliation: Catholicism
- Denomination: Jesuits
- Established: 1878; 148 years ago
- Principal: Óscar Morelli, S.J.
- Grades: 1–11
- Color: Blue
- Mascot: Wolf (of Loyola)
- Yearbook: Anuario
- Website: www.ci.edu.pe

Colegio de la Inmaculada is a private Catholic primary and secondary school, located in Lima, Peru. Established by the Society of Jesus in 1878, the school finds its roots in Royal College of San Martin, founded by the Jesuits in 1582.

== History ==
=== Background ===
This school has its roots in the former Royal College of San Martin, created by the Society of Jesus in Lima in 1582, which was aimed at students between the ages of 12 and 24. Grammar, philosophy, and theology were taught. It also finds its origin in the Colegio del Príncipe for children of Curacas who worked in the Enclosed Reduction.

During that period, the Jesuits were responsible for various educational institutions, which included the Maximum College of San Pablo de Lima, the Prince's College, and 15 schools in other cities of the Viceroyalty of Peru. After the expulsion of the Jesuits from Peru decreed by the King Carlos III of Spain, the school continued to function until 1770, when it was merged into the College of San Felipe and San Marcos, giving way to the Convictory of San Carlos and disappearing after 188 years of operation. The Society of Jesus was restored by Pope Pius VII in 1814.

=== Creation ===
With Peru's independence, the Jesuits returned to the country after 104 years of absence and Inmaculada College began to function at the old Colegio Máximo de San Pablo de Lima in 1878. Classes began on April 8, next to the Church of San Pedro de Lima on Cascarilla Street, by the Public Library of Lima on Abancay Avenue.

=== Adversity: Reactions to the opening of a Jesuit college in Lima ===
Historian Armando Nieto, S.J., indicates that the opening of a Jesuit school in Peru generated different reactions, both favorable and critical. Thus, in 1878, the newspaper El Nacional had on its editorial page a paragraph on the Society of Jesus and its members:

Exploiters of human conscience [said the writer], dark enemies of all advancement, Jewish exploiters of all rights who pervert the morals and intelligence of the people, angrily lifting the force of their crimes that have mocked religion to cover their wickedness; who, deterred by the chariot of progress, want to stop it in its triumphal march, to destroy it in outbursts of senseless wrath, writing with tears, blood, fire, and all the story of their life in the most dishonorable pages of human shame.

Spurred on by such defamation, in 1886 the Chamber of Deputies and the Senate approved the expulsion of the Jesuits and ordered their eviction from the premises of San Pedro. This caused the closing of classes until 1888 when the president refused to approve this law of Congress. The College was reopened and in the meantime was moving to various premises, including a house on Corcovado Street, until the Jesuits acquired the land of the French "Tivolí" Garden, located on La Colmena Avenue.

In the year 1901 the blessing of the first stone took place at the new premises at La Colmena Avenue (today Nicolás de Piérola Avenue) and in 1902 the move began. Also, next to the school the construction of St. Turibius of Mogrovejo Church began.

=== Early 20th century: the location of "La Colmena" ===
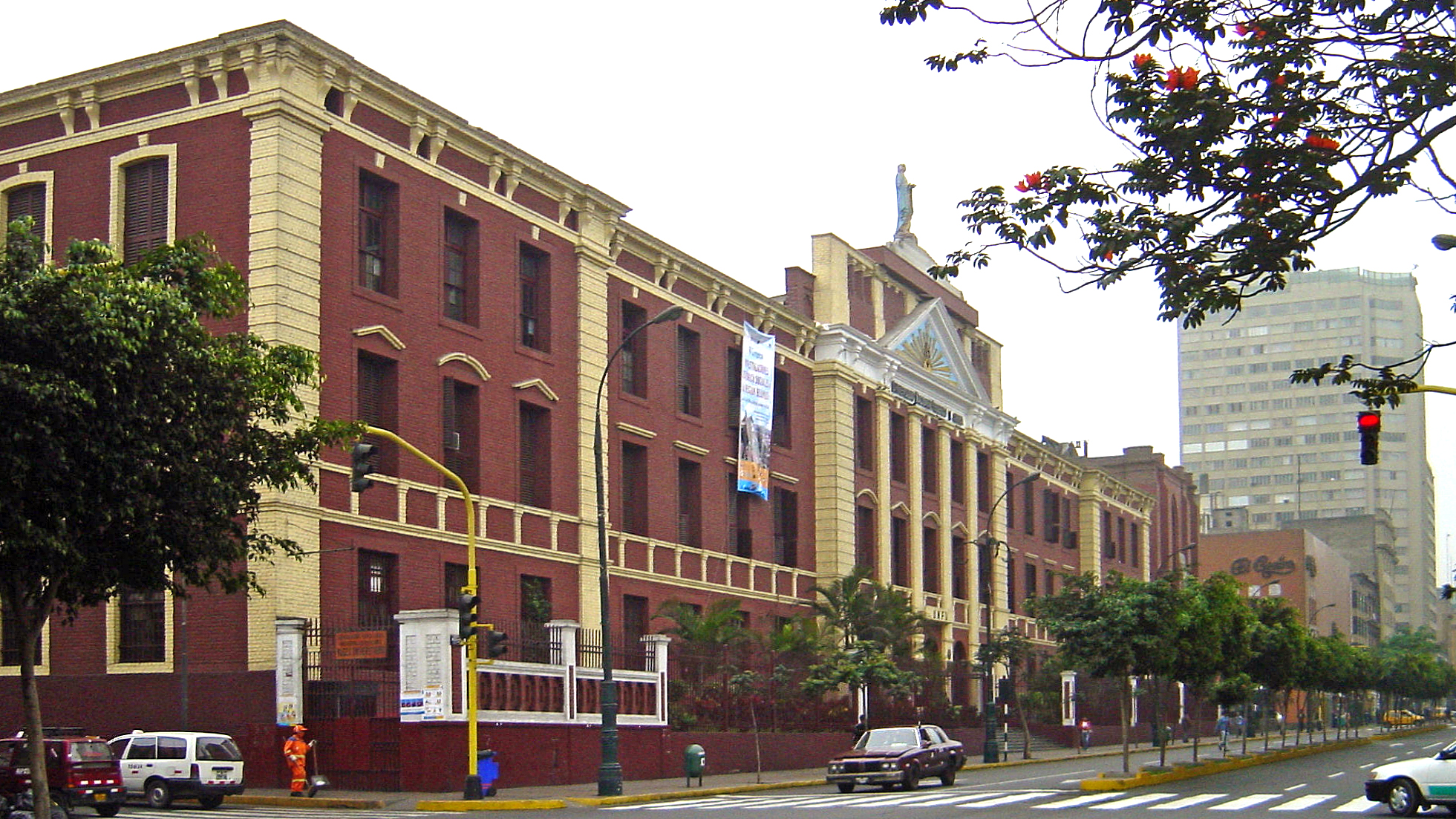
The building that housed the school until 1967, currently used by the Federico Villarreal National University.

At that time, unlike today, school covered 9 years: lowest, lower and upper high, preparatory, and secondary.

By 1913 the church construction was completed and in 1920 the main façade of the school was finished. Meanwhile, in the school different cultural, sports, and religious initiatives arose, such as the Berchmans Scout Troop, Alumni Association, Academy of Science and Geography, and traditions like the festival of St. Aloysius Gonzaga. Sports were contested with Colegio Nacional de Guadalupe, Colegio Sagrados Corazones Recoleta, and later with Colegio San Agustín and Santa María, among others.

When the children's section arose in 1950 the Servants of St. Joseph were put in charge of it. During these years enrollment grew from 182 students to more than 1,000. The school began construction of larger premises in Monterrico (Santiago de Surco), with the first stone laid in 1953.

=== Earthquake of 1940 in Lima ===
On 24 May 1940, an earthquake struck that severely affected several areas of Lima. Due to this, the School of Agriculture (now National Agrarian University) met for a time at La Colmena.

=== Location at Monterrico ===
In 1956, the infant school was inaugurated on a plot of 32 hectares in Monterrico. The secondary section, at La Colmena for 65 years, moved only in 1967 to where it presently meets. With a 1968 initiative a free afternoon shift was added, from which three groups graduated, in 1974, 1975, and 1976. In 1974 the Servants of St. Joseph left the children's school, celebrating twenty-four years of recognized labor.

During the following decades a coliseum and labs for science, computers, and languages were built, and the school infrastructure has seen continual improvements. The school celebrated its centenary in 1978 with various events, attended by the President of the Republic General Francisco Morales Bermúdez, an alumnus of the school. He bestowed on the school the Order of the Sun of Peru. The same year the current school theater was inaugurated.

In the year 2003, the school celebrated 125 years since its founding, through religious ceremonies, speeches, special dinners, and other activities. A special logo was designed as an emblem of the celebration. The Congress of the Republic of Peru acknowledged the school's important collaboration in the development of Peruvian education. Events were led by Carlos Ferrero Costa, Presiding Officer of the Congress.

== Sports ==
Colegio de la Inmaculada has extensive athletic facilities, which allows the development of various disciplines in the students with help from teachers and coaches, that employs:

- 3 regulation soccer fields
- 1 obstacle track
- 5 basketball courts
- 12 slabs for futsal
- 1 athletic track
- 1 gym
- indoor coliseum holding 500 people

In the sports field, the school has won various competitions, the most important being the general cup of ADECORE (Sports Association of Religious Colleges). It has led in its number of championships, with 18 ADECORE Olympic Championships (1982 to 1990, 1992, 2001 to 2007, and 2012). It has also won the Magic Cable Playoff Cup in various categories: Medians 2006 and 2007, Mayores 2007, and Infantil 2010, which includes the winning schools of the various sports organizations in Lima.

== Ecological projects ==
In the 1980s the bases were laid for Inmaculada to be a modern and ecological school, that serves as model in Lima and Peru. The school has projects of wastewater treatment, vermiculture, biodigestor, and farm and zoo of Peruvian animals and birds (some world birds like ostriches).

The wastewater treatment project made it worthy of the "Business Creativity" Award in 2003 in the category "Care of the Environment," granted by the Peruvian University of Applied Sciences.

== Coeducation ==
In 2008, after a process of careful analysis, and convinced of the need to open the school to the education of men and women for others, it was decided to propose to Father General of the Jesuits in Rome that we become coeducational, and approval came within a few months. The school made infrastructural and curricular changes to initiate the new program with children in 2010. The first coeducational class, called "Augusto Vargas Alzamora SJ," graduated in the year 2021, bicentennial year of Peru's independence.

== Association of Former Students of the Society of Jesus - ASIA Inmaculada Lima ==
The school has an Association of Former Students (ASIA-Inmaculada-Lima), which is part of the Latin American Confederation of Jesuit Alumni and this in turn of the World Union of Alumni of the Society of Jesus. ASIA Inmaculada Lima (for its Latin acronym Antiqui Societatis Iesu Alumni) aims to encourage and preserve among former students of colleges and universities led by the Society of Jesus in general and among the alumni of the College of the Immaculate Conception and Jesuits in Lima Peru in particular, the bonds of friendship, companionship, and solidarity acquired during their school or university education, for which they promote and carry out activities of various sorts: cultural, sporting, educational, recreational, religious, charitable, social, or others.

== Alumni (prominent former students) ==
- Augusto Vargas Alzamora, S.J., Rector of the College of the Immaculate, Cardinal of Peru, Archbishop of Lima and Primate of Peru (1990-1999), President Peruvian Episcopal Conference (1995-1998), graduation 1939
- Álvaro Ampuero, soccer player, graduation 2009
- Fernando Ampuero, writer and journalist
- César Fernández Arce, President of the Supreme Court of the Republic, graduation 1945
- Alberto Benavides de la Quintana, businessman and engineer, famous for founding the "Buenaventura Mining Company", graduation 1936
- Miguel Ojeda del Arco, lawyer and youngest prosecutor of the nation, graduation 1940
- Pedro Barreto, S.J., Archbishop of Huancayo
- Pedro Cateriano Bellido, Minister of Defense and Prime Minister, graduation 1975
- General Francisco Morales Bermúdez, President of Peru 1975-1980, graduation 1938
- Carlos Jurgens Byrne, C.S.S.R., Archbishop of Trujillo, graduation 1920
- Alonso Salas Chanduví, volunteer firefighter of Peru, graduation 2007
- Antonio Cillóniz, poet, graduation 1960
- Luis Antonio Eguiguren, historian and magistrate
- José María Eguren, poet
- Manuel Ulloa Elías, Prime Minister and Minister of Economy
- Luis Alberto Peirano Falconí, Minister of Culture, graduation 1963
- Luis Solari de la Fuente, Prime Minister and congressman, graduation 1964
- Pedro García, sports journalist, graduation 1990
- Luis Bambarén Gastelumendi, S.J., Bishop of Chimbote, President Peruvian Episcopal Conference (1999-2002)
- Fernando de Trazegnies Granda, Jurist and Minister of Foreign Affairs, graduation 1952
- Leopoldo de Trazegnies Granda, poet, novelist and historian, graduation 1957
- Jorge Alva Hurtado, national dean CIP and rector of the National University of Engineering
- Róger Rodríguez Iturri, President of the National Council of the Judiciary and Supreme Court of Justice, graduation 1963
- Luis Felipe Angell de Lama, "Sofocleto", philosopher, writer, and comedian
- Francisco Lombardi, film director and soccer coach
- Maurizio Medo, poet, editor and journalist, graduation 1981
- Ricardo Morán, producer
- César Moro (Alfredo Quispe Asín), poet, graduation 1922
- Enrique Seoane Ros, modernist architect
- Manuel Augusto Olaechea, jurist, graduation 1885
- Rafael Roncagliolo Orbegoso, Minister of Foreign Affairs, graduation 1960
- Manuel Masías Oyanguren, Mayor of Miraflores, graduation 1979
- Henry Pease, politician, President of the Congress of the Republic of Peru
- Alberto Tauro del Pino, historian, graduation 1930
- Santiago Roncagliolo, writer and winner of the 2006 Alfaguara Award, graduation 1991
- Marcial Rubio, Minister of Education and Rector of the PUCP, graduation 1964
- Milton Von Hesse La Serna, Minister of Agriculture, graduation 1981
- José María Salcedo, television presenter, graduation 1963
- Werner Schuler, soccer player, graduation 2007
- Matias Silva, tennis player, qualifier 2007 World Group of the Davis Cup, graduation 2000
- Fernando Del Solar, footballer, graduation 1994
- José Guillermo Del Solar "Chemo", soccer player; technical Director Peruvian Football Selection, graduation 1984
- Carlos Ortiz de Zevallos Paz Soldan, diplomat, graduation 1928
- Luis Alayza and Paz Soldán, writer, journalist and historian
- Felipe Portocarrero Suárez, PhD in sociology from the University of Oxford, Rector of the University of the Pacific from 2009, graduation 1972
- Fernando de Szyszlo, painter, graduation 1941
- Emilio Harth-Terré, civil engineer, architect, and historian
- Raul Tola, journalist, graduation 1992
- Rainer Torres, footballer, graduation 1996
- Rubén Vargas Ugarte, S.J., historian, graduation 1903
- Javier Prado Ugarteche, Prime Minister, philosopher
- Manuel Prado Ugarteche, President of Peru in 1939-1945 and 1956-1962, graduation of 1903
- Augusto Tamayo Vargas, writer, literary critic, graduation 1930
- Luis Fabio Xammar, lawyer, writer, poet, graduation 1929
- Martin Ramirez Seminario, ex professional soccer player club San Agustin, Sporting Cristal, Perú Selection; technical Director Football, graduation 1985

== See also ==
- Education in Peru
- List of Jesuit schools
