= Andy Polo =

Peruvian footballer (born 1994)

Personal information
- Full name: Andy Jorman Polo Andrade
- Date of birth: 29 September 1994 (age 32)
- Place of birth: Lima, Peru
- Height: 1.73 m (5 ft 8 in)
- Positions: Right wing-back; right winger; forward

Team information
- Current team: Universitario
- Number: 24

Youth career
- 2004–2011: Universitario

Senior career*
Years	Team	Apps	(Gls)
2011–2012	Universitario	59	(8)
2013–2014	USMP	28	(4)
2014	Inter Milan	0	(0)
2014–2016	Millonarios	17	(2)
2015–2016	→ Universitario (loan)	57	(5)
2017–2019	Morelia	24	(2)
2018	→ Portland Timbers (loan)	23	(1)
2019–2022	Portland Timbers	43	(2)
2019	Portland Timbers 2	1	(0)
2022–	Universitario	140	(6)

International career^{‡}
2009–2010	Peru U15	4	(1)
2010–2011	Peru U17	4	(3)
2011–2013	Peru U20	4	(1)
2016–	Peru	57	(2)
Medal record
Men's football
Representing Peru
Copa América
Runner-up	2019 Brazil
- * Club domestic league appearances and goals as of 18 July 2025 ‡ National team caps and goals as of 03:40, 14 November 2026 (UTC)

Andy Jorman Polo Andrade (born 29 September 1994), commonly known as La Joya (The Jewel), is a Peruvian professional footballer who plays as a right winger for Liga 1 club Universitario de Deportes and the Peru national team.

Polo made his professional debut with Peruvian club Universitario in the 2011 season at the young age of 16. Polo built a name for himself with his rapid acceleration and scoring skills. Being able to play in any of the four attacking positions, in his first season he quickly became an asset in the attacking force of his team. As the team's top scorer, Polo helped the Universitario under-20 squad win the 2011 U-20 Copa Libertadores.

== Club career ==
=== Universitario de Deportes ===
Polo got his start in the youth ranks of Universitario de Deportes and was promoted to the first team in 2011 under manager José del Solar. He made his official debut in the Torneo Descentralizado on 23 April 2011, against Alianza Atletico in the ninth round of the 2011 Descentralizado season, at the age of 16. His debut match was played at home in the Monumental and finished 1–0 in favour of Universitario de Deportes. Polo played from the start and was later substituted for Raúl Ruidíaz in the 67th minute. In his second professional match, he scored his first senior career goal on 6 May 2011 in a league match at home against Cienciano del Cuzco. Polo scored the goal in the 8th minute of the match by controlling with his head a lobbed through ball from Pablo Vitti and finishing with a strong left-footed shot into the top-right corner of the net.

In a very short time, he earned a spot in the starting eleven and played in the following league games. In round 15, Polo was on the scoresheet again in the 3–0 home win over Unión Comercio. Then, he made his Torneo Intermedio (now known as the Copa Inca) debut on 28 May 2011 in the First Round against Sport Ancash. With Universitario starting the match mainly with players from the reserves and already behind two goals, Polo entered the match in the 46th minute but could not help his side avoid the 3–2 elimination away to the Rosas Pampa Stadium in Huaraz. With the league in the mid season rest, Polo, aged 16 years, was selected by manager Javier Chirinos for the under-20 Universitario squad to participate in the first edition of the 2011 U-20 Copa Libertadores. He managed to score three goals in six games and finished as the team's top scorer. Polo went on to help his side win the very first U-20 Copa Libertadores alongside notable players such as Edison Flores and Willyan Mimbela. Chirinos included him in the starting eleven in all of the games including the final against Boca Juniors, which his side defeated 4–2 on penalties.

Polo made his debut in a senior international competition on 1 September 2011 in the second round of the Copa Sudamericana away to Deportivo Anzoategui. He was in the starting line up and later provided the assist for teammate Johan Fano's winning goal in the 49th minute, which gave his club a 2–1 win in the first leg. After his club got through to the next round and on the day of his 17th birthday, Polo was voted man of the match after he provided an assist for Raul Ruidiaz's goal in the 1–1 draw in the first leg match away to Godoy Cruz. In his fourth match of the tournament, he scored his first goal in the Copa Sudamericana in the second leg at home (Miguel Grau stadium) against Godoy Cruz. His goal came in the 85th minute by heading in a cross from Edison Flores and eventually forced the match to a penalty shootout, which Universitario won 3–2.

At the end of the season, Polo was given the award for Jugador Revelación (Breakthrough Player) of the 2011 Torneo Descentralizado season. In January 2012, he signed a contract with Serie A club Genoa to join the club upon reaching 18 years of age. Thus, Polo was to remain for six more months in Universitario; however, he ended up staying in the club during the whole year. In February 2013, he announced that his deal with Genoa had been annulled, for the club did not want to contract his services anymore. and that he would stay in Peru. On 23 March, Universitario made public that Polo would not stay in the club.

=== Universidad de San Martín ===
On 27 March, Universidad de San Martín announced that it had registered Polo before the transfer deadline date, but that he first had to solve irregularities in his contract with Universitario before being able to sign a contract with San Martín. In April, Polo was enabled to play with San Martín by the Chamber of Conciliation and Dispute Resolution of the Peruvian Football Federation. He played his first game with los Albos against Universidad Técnica de Cajamarca, coming from the bench in the second half. In July, Polo scored his first goal with the club against Alianza Lima.

=== Inter Milan ===
On 31 January 2014, Italian club Inter Milan signed Polo on a short-term contract for an undisclosed fee. He then joined the youth sector of the club, comprised by under-19 players. He played his first game in March against Padova and scored his first goal on the next matchday against Cagliari. Polo played a total of 9 matches, becoming the starting right winger, and scored 2 goals. He was also on the bench for a first team game against ChievoVerona on the last matchday of the season, but did not manage to play.

=== Millonarios and loan to Universitario ===
In July 2014, Colombian club Millonarios bought 50% of Polo's playing rights in 2014 and loaned Polo for 3 years with the option to buy the other 50%. He played his first game with the club in a Copa Colombia group stage 1–2 defeat against Llaneros, in which he gave an assist. He scored 2 goals in 11 games in six months with the team, during which his playing time diminished.

In January 2015, Polo was loaned to Universitario, initially barely playing under manager Luis Fernando Suárez. During the Torneo Clausura, the arrival of manager Roberto Chale saw him quickly entering the starting XI. In November, Polo scored his only goal of the season on matchday 17, with a free kick in a 1–2 victory against Sporting Cristal. He remained in Universitario for the 2016 season, becoming a key player in an offensive quartet that also included Edison Flores, Raúl Ruidíaz and Diego Guastavino, which led the club to victory in the 2016 Torneo Apertura. Flores was sold and Ruidíaz left on a loan before the Torneo Clausura, which led to a decrease in performance in this stage. Despite that, the team managed to reach the playoffs' semifinals, where they were eliminated by FBC Melgar 3–4 on aggregate, with Polo scoring in the away match. For the third place match, they defeated Deportivo Municipal 3–2.

=== Monarcas Morelia ===
In January 2017, Polo moved to Mexico and signed for Monarcas Morelia. He played his first game with the club on 22 January, in a 1–1 tie against Santos Laguna. He scored 2 goals in 15 league matches in his first season with the team. In the Copa MX, where the club reached the final, losing to CD Guadalajara, Polo scored 1 goal in 1 match. During the 2017–18 season, he played a total of 9 league matches and 1 cup match without scoring a goal.

=== Portland Timbers ===
In January 2018, due to a lack of minutes at Morelia, he signed on loan for one season with Portland Timbers of Major League Soccer. Targeted Allocation Money was used to avoid the use of a designated player contract. Polo made his debut in the opening round of the 2018 MLS fixtures. He started the game as the Timbers lost 2–1 to LA Galaxy at the StubHub Center. The team managed to reach the MLS Cup 2018 in December, which they lost 2–0 to Atlanta United with Polo playing as a starter. After good performances and securing a starting spot, his move to Portland became permanent at the end of that season, earning $150,000 guaranteed salary per year. On 22 May 2021, Polo suffered a ruptured quadriceps muscle and a torn meniscus in his left leg, ending his season. The injury was the result of a horror tackle by LA Galaxy defender Derrick Williams in the 44th minute, for which Williams was shown a red card.

On 9 February 2022, he was suspended by MLS pending an investigation into allegations of domestic violence made by his ex-wife. The following day Portland terminated Polo's contract with the club.

=== Return to Universitario ===
After being terminated by the Timbers, he signed with Universitario de Deportes in March 2022. The contract was paid in full by MLS upon his termination with his Contract with the Timbers. Despite his return, there was backlash by fans of the club as well as from the Peruvian Ministry of Women and Vulnerable Populations, with the Ministry releasing a statement expressing their solidarity with Genesis Alarcon and her children and urged the club to take immediate actions in response to the events related to Polo. In 2023, after the arrival of manager Jorge Fossati, Polo was reconverted into a right wing-back, later winning the 2023 Liga 1 after defeating Alianza Lima in the finals. In 2024, he played a total of 40 matches, scoring 3 goals and giving 15 assists, winning a second consecutive national championship with Universitario in the year of its centennial.

== International career ==
Polo began playing for Peru at the U15 level in the 2009 South American U-15 Championship, being later called at the U17 level for the 2010 South American Games and the 2011 South American U-17 Championship and at the U20 level for the 2013 South American Youth Football Championship, where Polo scored in the 3–2 victory against Ecuador in the final stage. He made his debut with the senior team in 2016, in a 1–0 away defeat against Uruguay for the 2018 World Cup CONMEBOL qualification, later being included in the squad for the Copa América Centenario. In May 2018, he was named in Peru's squad for the 2018 World Cup in Russia.

== Personal life ==
Polo was born in the Barrios Altos neighbourhood of Lima. In 2022, his estranged wife filed a civil suit against him for domestic violence. In 2024, the jury in Oregon awarded her $600,000 in damages, finding Polo liable for assault, battery, and negligence.

== Career statistics ==
=== Club ===
As of 25 August 2025

Appearances and goals by club, season and competition
Club	Season	League			National cup		Continental		Other		Total	
Club	Season	Division	Apps	Goals	Apps	Goals	Apps	Goals	Apps	Goals	Apps	Goals
Universitario	2011	Peruvian Primera División	19	4	0	0	5 (Note: Appearance(s) in the Copa Sudamericana)	3	—		24	7
Universitario	2012	Peruvian Primera División	40	4	2	0	—		—		42	4
Universitario	Total		59	8	2	0	5	3	—		66	11
USMP	2013	Peruvian Primera División	28	4	0	0	—		—		28	4
Inter Milan	2013–14	Serie A	0	0	0	0	0	0	0	0	0	0
Millonarios	2014	Categoría Primera A	11	2	5	0	1	0	—		17	0
Universitario (loan)	2015	Peruvian Primera División	24	1	1	0	2	0	—		27	1
Universitario (loan)	2016	Peruvian Primera División	33	4	0	0	2	0	—		35	4
Universitario (loan)	Total		57	5	1	0	4	0	—		62	5
Atlético Morelia	2016–17	Liga MX	15	2	2	1	—		—		17	3
Atlético Morelia	2017–18	Liga MX	9	0	1	0	—		—		10	0
Atlético Morelia	Total		24	2	3	1	—		—		27	3
Portland Timbers (loan)	2018	Major League Soccer	23	1	1	0	—		5 (Note: Appearance(s) in the MLS Cup Playoffs)	0	29	1
Portland Timbers	2019	Major League Soccer	19	0	0	0	—		1	0	20	0
Portland Timbers	2020	Major League Soccer	20	2	0	0	—		1	0	21	2
Portland Timbers	2021	Major League Soccer	4	0	0	0	1 (Note: Appearance in CONCACAF Champions Cup)	0	0	0	5	0
Portland Timbers	Total		43	2	0	0	1	0	2	0	46	0
Portland Timbers 2	2019	USL Championship	1	0	—		—		—		1	0
Universitario	2022	Peruvian Primera División	28	1	0	0	—		—		28	1
Universitario	2023	Peruvian Primera División	32	1	0	0	9	0	—		41	0
Universitario	2024	Peruvian Primera División	34	3	0	0	6	0	—		40	3
Universitario	2025	Peruvian Primera División	24	1	0	0	8 (Note: Appearances in Copa Libertadores)	0	—		32	1
Universitario	Total		118	6	0	0	23	0	—		141	6
Career total			364	30	16	1	34	3	7	0	406	34

=== International ===
As of match played 14 November 2026

Appearances and goals by national team and year
National team	Year	Apps	Goals
Peru	2016	9	1
Peru	2017	6	0
Peru	2018	6	0
Peru	2019	10	0
Peru	2020	4	0
Peru	2021	0	0
Peru	2022	2	0
Peru	2023	6	0
Peru	2024	9	0
Peru	2025	4	1
Peru	2026	1	0
Total		57	2

As of match played 20 March 2025

Scores and results list Peru's goal tally first, score column indicates score after each Polo goal.

List of international goals scored by Andy Polo
No.	Date	Venue	Opponent	Score	Result	Competition
1	28 May 2016	RFK Stadium, Washington, D.C., United States	El Salvador	2–0	3–1	Friendly
2	20 March 2025	Estadio Nacional, Lima, Peru	Bolivia	1–0	3–1	2026 FIFA World Cup qualification

== Honours ==
Universitario de Deportes

- U-20 Copa Libertadores: 2011
- Peruvian Primera División (3): 2023, 2024, 2025

Portland Timbers

- MLS is Back Tournament: 2020
