= Josimar Vargas =

Peruvian footballer (born 1990)

Personal information
- Full name: Josimar Hugo Vargas Garcia
- Date of birth: 6 April 1990 (age 36)
- Place of birth: Lima, Peru
- Height: 1.73 m (5 ft 8 in)
- Position: Midfielder

Team information
- Current team: Carlos Stein
- Number: 15

Senior career*
Years	Team	Apps	(Gls)
2011–2016	Universitario	106	(2)
2017	Sport Rosario	29	(0)
2018	Sport Boys	6	(0)
2018–2019	Carlos A. Mannucci	34	(0)
2020–	Carlos Stein	75	(0)

International career^{‡}
2013–	Peru	1	(0)
- * Club domestic league appearances and goals as of 30 October 2022 ‡ National team caps and goals as of 18 April 2013

Josimar Hugo Vargas Garcia (born 6 April 1990) is a Peruvian professional footballer who plays as a midfielder for FC Carlos Stein.

== Club career ==
Vargas joined Universitario de Deportes in 2011 and debuted against Sporting Cristal

== Honours ==
Universitario de Deportes

- Torneo Descentralizado: 2013
