= Miguel Huertas =

Peruvian footballer (born 1977)

Personal information
- Full name: Miguel Ángel Huertas del Águila
- Date of birth: 7 June 1977 (age 49)
- Place of birth: Trujillo, Peru
- Height: 1.69 m (5 ft 7 in)
- Position: Right back

Team information
- Current team: Alfonso Ugarte

Senior career*
Years	Team	Apps	(Gls)
2000	Deportivo UPAO		
2001	Alianza Lima		
2002	Coopsol Trujillo		
2003–2005	Melgar		
2006–2007	Cienciano	54	(2)
2008	Univ. César Vallejo	24	(0)
2009–2010	Sport Huancayo	77	(11)
2011	CNI	21	(0)
2012	Melgar	35	(0)
2013–	Alfonso Ugarte		
- * Club domestic league appearances and goals as of 20 April 2013

Miguel Ángel "La Rana" Huertas del Águila (born 7 June 1977 in Trujillo) is a Peruvian footballer who plays as a right back for Alfonso Ugarte de Puno.

== Club career ==
Huertas made his Torneo Descentralizado league debut in 2000 playing for Deportivo UPAO.

Huertas joined Peruvian giants Alianza Lima in January 2001. While there, he won his first silverware as Alianza finished as champions of the 2001 Descentralizado.

== Honours ==
=== Club ===
Alianza Lima

- Torneo Descentralizado (1): 2001

Cienciano

- Clausura: 2006
