= Álvaro Ampuero =

Peruvian footballer (born 1992)

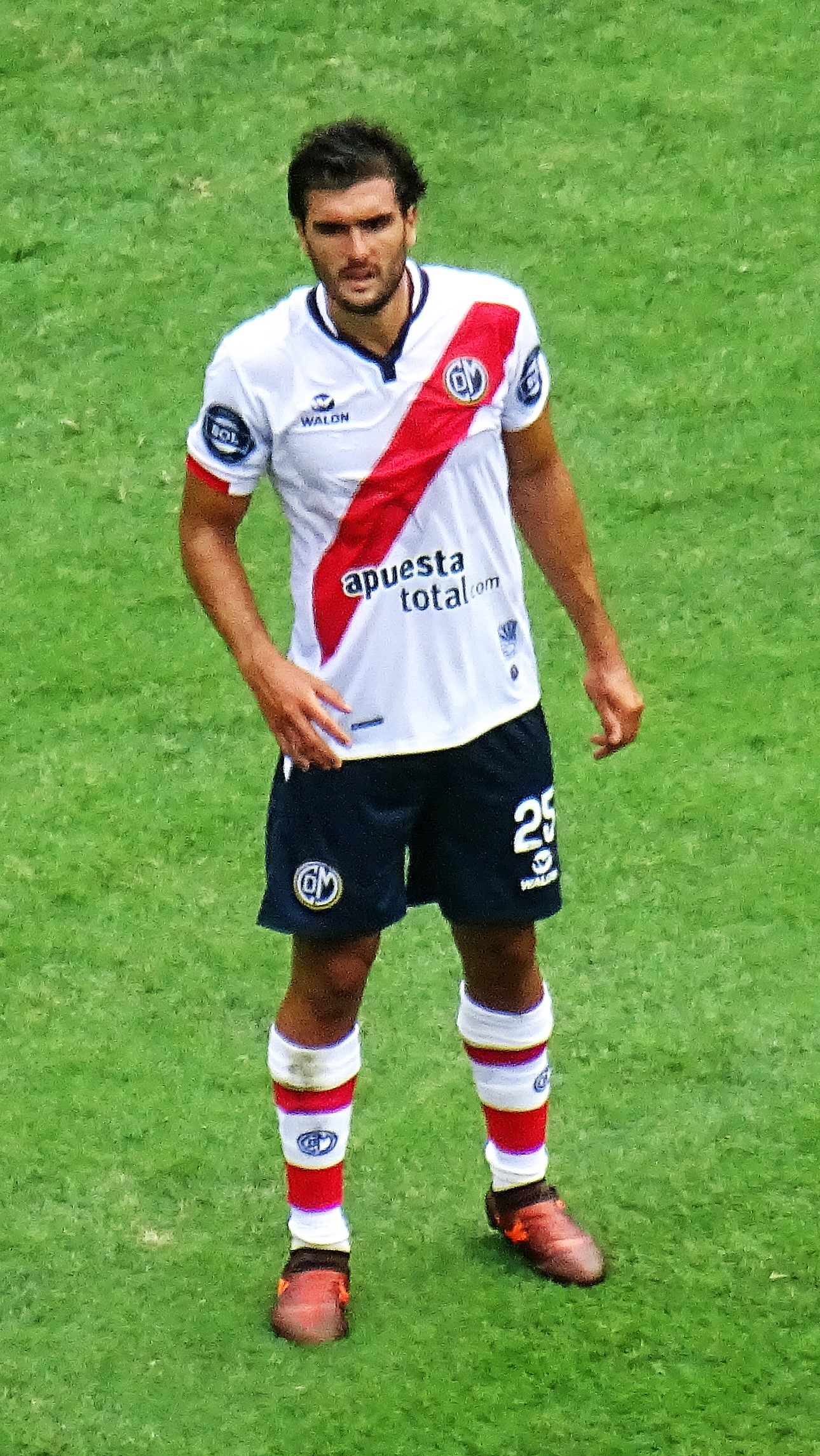
- Ampuero with Peru in 2018

Personal information
- Full name: Álvaro Francisco Ampuero García-Rosell
- Date of birth: September 25, 1992 (age 34)
- Place of birth: Lima, Peru
- Height: 1.83 m (6 ft 0 in)
- Positions: Centre-back; left-back

Team information
- Current team: Cusco FC
- Number: 6

Youth career
- 2007–2008: Regatas Lima
- 2008–2011: Universitario de Deportes

Senior career*
Years	Team	Apps	(Gls)
2011–2013	Universitario de Deportes	50	(5)
2013-2014	Parma	5	(0)
2013–2014	→ Padova (loan)	10	(0)
2014	→ Salernitana (loan)	5	(0)
2014–2015	Universitario	17	(0)
2016–2018	Universidad San Martín	69	(2)
2018–2020	Deportivo Municipal	48	(1)
2019–2020	→ Zira (loan)	16	(0)
2020-2021	Carlos A. Mannucci	0	(0)
2022	Viktoria Žižkov	0	(0)
2022	Universidad San Martín	26	(1)
2023–2024	Atlético Grau	35	(1)
2025–	Cusco FC	38	(2)

International career
2012–2013	Peru	9	(0)
- * Club domestic league appearances and goals as of 29 December 2025

Álvaro Francisco Ampuero García-Rossell (born September 25, 1992) is a Peruvian professional footballer who plays as a centre-back or left-back for Cusco FC.

Ampuero has an outstanding advancing potency which combined with his precise shot make of him a constant threat on an attacking position. On August 25, 2012, he was signed by Parma to play for five seasons.

== Club career ==
Ampuero made his official debut for Universitario de Deportes on 1 September 2011 in a Copa Sudamericana elimination match against Deportivo Anzoategui, at the age of 18. Starting at the left back position, his debut was a memorable one as he managed to score the first goal in the 2–1 away win for his club and was voted man of the match. This was also his first official goal, which was scored in the 30th minute by dribbling past his defender and shooting a strong left-footed shot into the bottom-right corner of the net. Ampuero made his Torneo Descentralizado debut on 17 September 2011, against Sport Boys away to the Estadio Miguel Grau. He started at left back and lasted the entire match, but it finished in a 2–0 loss for his side.

He made his Serie A debut for Parma on March 17 in the 2–0 loss against AS Roma.

== Career statistics ==
=== Club ===
As of 1 February 2014

Appearances and goals by club, season and competition
Club	Season	League			National cup (Note: Includes Copa Inca, Coppa Italia.)		Continental		Total	
Club	Season	Division	Apps	Goals	Apps	Goals	Apps	Goals	Apps	Goals
Universitario de Deportes	2011	Torneo Descentralizado	6	1	0	0	5 (Note: Appearances in Copa Sudamericana)	1	11	2
Universitario de Deportes	2012	Torneo Descentralizado	44	4	—		—		44	4
Parma	2012–13	Serie A	5	0	0	0	—		5	0
Padova (loan)	2013–14	Serie A	9	0	0	0	—		9	0
Career total			64	5	0	0	5	1	69	6

== Honours ==
Universitario de Deportes

- U-20 Copa Libertadores: 2011
