= Carlos de Castro =

Uruguayan footballer (1979–2015)

Personal information
- Full name: Carlos Enrique de Castro Storace
- Date of birth: 19 April 1979
- Place of birth: Montevideo, Uruguay
- Date of death: 16 February 2015 (aged 35)
- Place of death: Mérida, Venezuela
- Height: 1.85 m (6 ft 1 in)
- Position: Defender

Youth career
- 1994–1999: Miramar Misiones

Senior career*
| Years | Team | Apps | (Gls) |
| 2001–2002 | FC Luzern | 7 | (0) |
| 2000–2006 | Miramar Misiones | 113 | (7) |
| 2007 | Melipilla | 34 | (1) |
| 2008 | San José | 12 | (0) |
| 2008 | Thrasyvoulos | 1 | (0) |
| 2009–2010 | Xelajú | 29 | (2) |
| 2010 | Estudiantes de Mérida | 3 | (0) |
| 2011 | César Vallejo | 26 | (1) |
| 2012–2015 | Estudiantes de Mérida | | |
- * Club domestic league appearances and goals as of 1 November 2012

Carlos Enrique de Castro Storace (Spanish pronunciation: [ˈkaɾlos ðe ˈkastɾo]; 19 April 1979 – 16 February 2015) was an Uruguayan footballer who played as a centre back.

== Club career ==
He played abroad for Deportes Melipilla of Chile, Club San José of Bolivia, and Thrasyvoulos F.C. of Greece.

== Death ==
On 31 January 2015, de Castro was injured when the minibus carrying him and other Estudiantes de Mérida players crashed on the José Antonio Páez highway in Carabobo, Venezuela. In the accident, he suffered a fractured spinal cord. During surgery to correct his injury, de Castro suffered a fatal cardiac arrest due to respiratory failure.
