= Cristian García (Peruvian footballer) =

Peruvian footballer (born 1981)

Personal information
- Full name: Cristian Antonio García González
- Date of birth: 2 March 1981 (age 45)
- Place of birth: Lima, Peru
- Height: 1.78 m (5 ft 10 in)
- Position: Left back

Team information
- Current team: Deportivo Municipal
- Number: 16

Senior career*
Years	Team	Apps	(Gls)
1999–2001	Cienciano		
2002–2003	Alianza Lima		
2004	Melgar		
2005	Alianza Atlético		
2006	José Gálvez	13	(0)
2007–2008	Sport Ancash	59	(0)
2009	Total Chalaco	33	(0)
2010–2013	Cienciano	95	(6)
2014	Real Garcilaso	12	(0)
2015–	Deportivo Municipal	3	(0)
- * Club domestic league appearances and goals as of 23 September 2012

Cristian Antonio García González (born 2 March 1981) is a Peruvian footballer who plays as a left back for Deportivo Municipal in the Torneo Descentralizado.

== Club career ==
Cristian García began his career in 1999 with Cienciano. There he had his first experience in the Torneo Descentralizado and played with the Cusco outfit until the mid part of the 2001 season.

He then joined Alianza Lima in July 2001.

== International career ==
On 27 September 2012 García was called up to play for the Peru national team.
