= Carlos Uribe =

Colombian footballer (born 1969)

Personal information
- Full name: Carlos Alberto Uribe
- Date of birth: 26 September 1969 (age 57)
- Place of birth: Medellín, Colombia-
- Position: Forward

Senior career*
Years	Team	Apps	(Gls)
- Independiente Medellín

International career
- Colombia
- * Club domestic league appearances and goals

Carlos Alberto Uribe (born 26 September 1969) is a Colombian former footballer who played as a forward. He competed in the men's tournament at the 1992 Summer Olympics.
