= Marcelo Asteggiano =

Argentine footballer (born 1965)

Personal information
- Full name: Marcelo José Fabián Asteggiano Bertolini
- Date of birth: August 4, 1965 (age 61)
- Place of birth: Rafaela, Argentina

Youth career
- Ben Hur

Senior career*
| Years | Team | Apps | (Gls) |
| 1984–1989 | Racing | 51 | (1) |
| 1989–1990 | Cruz Azul | | |
| 1991 | Huracán | 9 | (0) |
| 1992 | Peñarol | | |
| 1993–1994 | Universitario de Deportes | | |
| 1995–1998 | Sporting Cristal | | |
| 1999–2000 | Atlético de Rafaela | 15 | (0) |
| 2000 | Defensor Sporting | | |
| 2000–2003 | Ben Hur | 7 | (1) |

Managerial career
- 2005: Sporting Cristal (assistant)
- 2007: Peru (assistant)
- –: César Vallejo
- 2018: Deportivo Coopsol
- 2018: 9 de Julio de Rafaela (youth)
- 2018–: Atlético de Rafaela (youth)
- * Club domestic league appearances and goals

Marcelo Asteggiano (born 4 August 1965) is an Argentine former footballer, who played as a defender, and a coach.

== Career ==
Born in Rafaela, Asteggiano began playing football in local side Club Sportivo Ben Hur's youth system. He made his professional debut in the Argentine Primera División with Racing Club de Avellaneda. After a few seasons with Racing, Asteggiano embarked on a journeyman period where he had brief spells with several clubs, including Cruz Azul and Peñarol. He made his name in Peru, winning the 1993 league title with Club Universitario de Deportes.

After he retired from playing, Asteggiano began a career as a football coach. He was an assistant to José del Solar at Sporting Cristal, as the club won the 2005 league title. He later would become assistant to del Solar when he managed the Peru national football team. Asteggiano was appointed manager of Club Deportivo Universidad César Vallejo and Deportivo Coopsol before returning to Argentina to manage youth sides of his hometown clubs.
