= Ronal Céliz =

Peruvian footballer (born 1983)

Personal information
- Full name: Ronal Céliz Milian
- Date of birth: 30 August 1983 (age 43)
- Place of birth: Tarapoto, Peru
- Position: Striker

Team information
- Current team: Ayacucho FC
- Number: 13

Senior career*
Years	Team	Apps	(Gls)
2008	Defensor Porvenir		
2009	Universitario Trujillo		
2010–2012	Unión Comercio	36	(8)
2013	Universidad San Martín	9	(0)
2014	Sport Huancayo	19	(5)
2015–	Ayacucho	5	(0)
- * Club domestic league appearances and goals as of 30 April 2012

Ronal Céliz Milian (born 30 August 1983) is a Peruvian footballer who plays as a striker for Torneo Descentralizado club Ayacucho FC.

== Club career ==
Céliz played for Copa Perú side Defensor Porvenir in 2008. Then he played for Universitario Trujillo in the 2009 season. In January 2010 he started playing for Unión Comercio in the 2010 Copa Perú season. He helped his side win the title that season and thus promotion to the Torneo Descentralizado.

Celiz made his debut in the Descentralizado in the First Round of the 2011 season away to Alianza Lima. Manager Hernán Lisi allowed him to play the entire match, but it finished in a 4–1 win for Alianza Lima.
