= Gianfranco Espinoza =

Peruvian footballer (born 1986)

Personal information
- Full name: Gianfranco Roberto Espinoza Andrade
- Date of birth: 28 August 1986 (age 40)
- Place of birth: Lima, Peru
- Height: 1.83 m (6 ft 0 in)
- Position: Centre back

Senior career*
Years	Team	Apps	(Gls)
2004–2007	Coronel Bolognesi	55	(4)
2008	Sport Boys	41	(2)
2009	Alianza Atlético	28	(0)
2010–2011	León de Huánuco	56	(5)
2012	Universidad San Martín	5	(1)
2013	Unión Comercio	11	(1)
2013–2015	León de Huánuco	50	(3)
2017	Sport Boys	14	(0)

International career
2011	Peru	1	(0)
- * Club domestic league appearances and goals as of 5 April 2018

Gianfranco Roberto Espinoza Andrade (born 28 August 1986 in Lima) is a Peruvian international footballer who most recently played for Sport Boys as a defender.

== Club career ==
Espinoza has played for Coronel Bolognesi, Sport Boys, Alianza Atlético and León de Huánuco.

== International career ==
He made his international debut for Peru in 2011.
