= Christian Dávila =

Peruvian footballer (born 1990)

Cristian Dávila
Personal information
- Full name: Cristian Gabriel Dávila Ríos
- Date of birth: 6 July 1990 (age 36)
- Place of birth: Lima, Peru
- Height: 1.86 m (6 ft 1 in)
- Position: Right back

Team information
- Current team: Deportivo Municipal
- Number: 2

Senior career*
Years	Team	Apps	(Gls)
2008–2009	Universitario		
2009–2010	Carlos A. Mannucci		
2011–2014	Universitario	29	(1)
2015	Sport Huancayo	3	(0)
2016	Alianza Atlético	8	(0)
2017	Real Garcilaso	14	(2)
2018–2019	Unión Comercio	45	(0)
2020–	Deportivo Municipal	5	(0)
- * Club domestic league appearances and goals as of 22:09, 14 September 2020 (UTC)

Cristian Gabriel Dávila Ríos (born 6 July 1990) is a Peruvian footballer who plays as defense. He plays for Deportivo Municipal.

== Club career ==
David began playing as a rookie in Universitario de Deportes for a year, before playing his second year in Carlos A. Mannucci. After a single year in the club, he made a return to Universitario.

== Honors ==
=== Club ===
Universitario de Deportes

- Torneo Descentralizado (1): 2013
- Reservations Tournament (1): 2014

=== International ===
- U-20 Copa Libertadores (1): 2011
