= Aurelio Saco Vértiz =

Peruvian footballer (born 1989)

Personal information
- Full name: Aurelio Saco Vértiz Figari
- Date of birth: 30 May 1989 (age 37)
- Place of birth: Miami, United States
- Height: 1.84 m (6 ft 0 in)
- Position: Left-back

Youth career
- Regatas Lima
- New York Red Bulls

Senior career*
Years	Team	Apps	(Gls)
2008–2009	Univ. San Martín	13	(0)
2010	Total Chalaco	2	(0)
2010	Deportivo Coopsol	8	(3)
2011–2014	Universitario	46	(2)
2015	Cienciano	16	(1)
2016	Fort Lauderdale Strikers	3	(0)

International career
2008–2009	Peru U20	4	(0)
- * Club domestic league appearances and goals

Aurelio Saco Vértiz Figari (born May 30, 1989) is a Peruvian former professional footballer who played as a left-back.

== Club career ==
Saco Vértiz began his senior career with Universidad San Martin in the 2008 season. His league debut in the Torneo Descentralizado came on February 20, 2008, in Round 2 at home to Sport Áncash. Manager Víctor Rivera put him in the match for goal-winning scorer Mario Leguizamón in the 79th minute to secure the 1–0 win for his side. The following game in Round 3 he played as a starter but only lasted until the 35th minute coming off for Ronald Quinteros in the thrilling 4–3 away win over Sporting Cristal.

In January 2016, Saco Vértiz signed with Fort Lauderdale Strikers of the North American Soccer League.

== International career ==
While playing for Universidad San Martín, Saco Vértiz featured for the Peru U20 side in 2009.

== Personal life ==
As he was born in Miami to Peruvian parents, Saco Vértiz also has American nationality.

== Honours ==
Universitario de Deportes

- Torneo Descentralizado: 2013

Universidad San Martín

- Peruvian League: 2008
