= Edison Flores =

Peruvian footballer (born 1994)

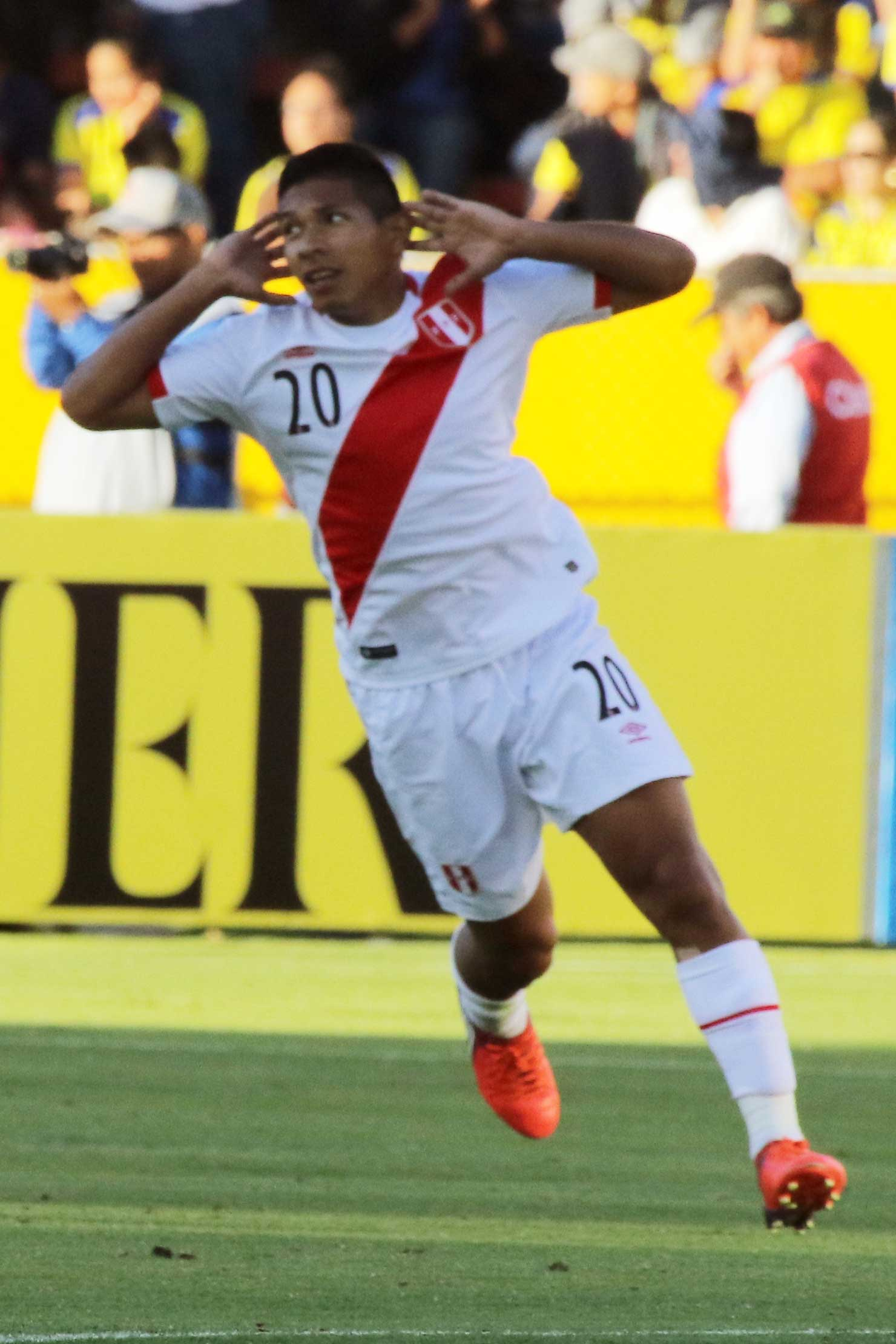
- Flores with Peru in 2017

Personal information
- Full name: Edison Michael Flores Peralta
- Date of birth: 14 May 1994 (age 32)
- Place of birth: Comas, Lima, Peru
- Height: 1.70 m (5 ft 7 in)
- Positions: Attacking midfielder; winger

Team information
- Current team: Universitario
- Number: 19

Youth career
- 2008–2011: Universitario

Senior career*
Years	Team	Apps	(Gls)
2011–2012	Universitario	37	(4)
2012–2014	Villarreal B	44	(7)
2014–2016	Universitario	56	(11)
2016–2018	AaB	47	(2)
2018–2020	Morelia	45	(12)
2020–2022	D.C. United	41	(3)
2022–2024	Atlas	22	(0)
2023–2024	→ Universitario (loan)	47	(15)
2025–	Universitario	43	(7)

International career^{‡}
2010–2011	Peru U17	5	(3)
2012–2013	Peru U20	11	(2)
2013–	Peru	84	(17)
Medal record
Men's football
Representing Peru
Copa América
Runner-up	2019 Brazil
- * Club domestic league appearances and goals as of 23:17, 25 August 2025 (UTC) ‡ National team caps and goals as of 03:39, 11 June 2025 (UTC)

Edison Michael Flores Peralta (born 14 May 1994) is a Peruvian professional footballer who plays as an attacking midfielder and winger for Liga 1 club Universitario de Deportes and the Peru national team.

Flores began his career in the youth ranks of Lima club Universitario de Deportes. In 2011, at the age of 17, he helped Universitario win the U-20 Copa Libertadores and was named best player of the tournament.

With the national team, Flores participated at the 2018 FIFA World Cup and was the joint-top scorer (together with Paolo Guerrero) for Peru in the qualifiers for said competition, with five goals. He also played at three Copa América tournaments in 2016, 2019 and 2024, helping Peru finish as runners-up in 2019.

== Club career ==
=== Universitario de Deportes ===
Flores played in the youth ranks of Universitario de Deportes from 2008 to 2011. In March 2011, at the age of 16, he was promoted to the first team under manager José del Solar. He was part of the U-20 Universitario team that won the 2011 U-20 Copa Libertadores and was named best player of the tournament. He made his official league debut in the Torneo Descentralizado on 31 July 2011 in an away match against Juan Aurich for matchday 16 of the 2011 season, at the age of 17. He entered the game in the 64th minute for Andy Polo, and the final result was 1–0 in favor of Aurich. Later, in matchday 23, he played his first Peruvian Clásico in the Descentralizado on 24 September 2011, at home in the Monumental. At the time, Alianza Lima was in first place in the league. He entered the match in the 68th minute for Miguel Angel Torres when the score was tied at 1–1. Then in the 92nd minute of the derby, Flores dribbled past three Alianza Lima players and provide the pass that led to Martin Morel's winning goal. The derby finished in a 2–1 win for Universitario.

The following season, he scored his first professional goal on matchday 14, in a 2–1 victory against León de Huanuco. On matchday 23, he scored from a header in the Clásico in a 2–1 victory.

=== Villarreal and return to Universitario ===
On 31 August 2012, Flores was announced as the new signing for Villarreal's reserve team, Villarreal B. He played his first game for the club in a 1–0 victory against CF Badalona, and scored his first goal in a 1–1 tie against Levante B. In March 2014, Villarreal announced that Flores would be transferred to Universitario. After his return, he played the 2014 Copa Libertadores group stage and finished the year with 3 goals in 22 matches. In the 2016 season, he was a key part of an offensive quartet that also included Andy Polo, Raúl Ruidíaz and Diego Guastavino, which won the 2016 Torneo Apertura, after a 0–1 away victory against Sporting Cristal. The game was won due to an overhead kick goal by Flores.

=== Aalborg BK ===
On 11 August 2016, Flores move to Danish-side Aalborg BK was confirmed. After interest from Belgian, Dutch and Spanish sides, Flores signed a 4-year deal. He made his debut on 15 August 2016, in a 2–1 home victory against Esbjerg fB. On 28 August 2016, he scored his first goal in the Danish Superliga, as he provided the equalizing goal in a 2–1-win against Aarhus Gymnastikforening. Flores played 18 league matches in his first season, scoring one goal, and also scored once in two matches in the Danish Cup, before his club was eliminated by Midtjylland in the quarter-finals.

=== Morelia ===
In 2018, Edison move to Mexican legendary club Monarcas Morelia was confirmed. The Mexican team announced Edison as their new player on a four-year deal.

=== D.C. United ===
On 14 January 2020, D.C. United acquired Flores paying a club-record $5 million transfer fee. Flores debuted on 29 February 2020, in a 1–2 loss against the Colorado Rapids. In late August, Flores suffered a head-on-head collision and was out 6 weeks to repair facial fractures. He returned from his injury on 11 October 2020, in a 1–2 loss against the Chicago Fire. On 1 November 2020, Flores contributed his first assists for the team, providing two in a 3–4 loss against the New England Revolution. Flores finished D.C. United's disappointing 2020 season with 13 appearances and three assists.

Flores scored his first MLS goal on 13 May 2021, securing a 1–0 win over the Chicago Fire. On 23 May, Flores suffered a hamstring injury during a match against the Philadelphia Union, which he returned from in mid-August.

=== Second return to Universitario ===
One of the most iconic moments of his return, was his goal against Alianza Lima, to win the Peruvian championship for the first time in 10 years. Edinson Flores would then score two of the four winning goals for Universitario to win the "Apertura" tournament against Chankas.

== International career ==
Flores played for all youth level of Peru, and was part of U-20 squad in the 2013 South American Youth Football Championship, where he left a great mark in his career. In the final match against U-20 Chile, which Peru had to win and eliminate Chile to qualify for 2013 FIFA U-20 World Cup, he scored from a header to put Peru a lead. However, his side could not protect this advantage because of a superb free kick from Bryan Rabello which levelled the game. It eventually ended 1–1 and Chile qualified at the expense of Peru, but Flores' performance impressed then-manager Sergio Markarián and he was called to the senior squad for the first time in perpetration for the friendly against South Korea and the remaining matches of 2014 World Cup qualifying, but he only made his debut in the friendly against South Korea. Peru's failures to qualify for both U-20 and senior World Cup had been a dark mark on his career and he became less used.

Under Ricardo Gareca, he was mostly ignored and not included in the final 23 of Peruvian squad for the 2015 Copa América held in Chile. After the competition, his performance at the national league got attracted to Gareca and subsequently, Flores was summoned by Gareca for the Copa América Centenario held in the United States. He left a great landmark in the team on his maiden major competition debut, scoring one goal against Ecuador in a 2–2 draw. Although he didn't score other goal than the one he netted to Ecuador, he helped Peru to top the group and eliminated Brazil in process. His impressive performance made him a new star of Peru and he was frequently selected for Peru's remaining 2018 World Cup campaign, where he laid history in helping Peru to qualify for the World Cup after 36 years absence.

In May 2018, he was named in Peru's provisional 23-man squad for the 2018 World Cup in Russia.

In Peru's second game during the 2019 Copa America, he scored a goal in the 3–1 victory over Bolivia. In the quarterfinals, he scored the winning penalty against Uruguay in the penalty shootout, and sent his team to the semifinals. He scored the first goal against Chile in the semi-finals to send Peru into the finals against Brazil.

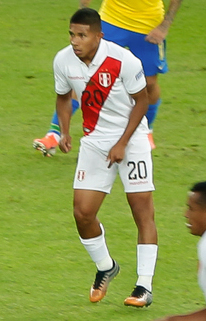
Flores with Peru at the 2019 Copa América

== Personal life ==
On 21 December 2019, Flores married his long time girlfriend Ana Siucho in a televised wedding.

He is of African and Quechua origins and, alongside teammate Renato Tapia, have been working to promote the indigenous culture of Peruvian Quechua people.

On 28 June 2025, Flores announced on social media that he and his wife, Ana Siucho, had been separated for several months. The separation came after five years of marriage. Flores said that they would continue working together to raise their daughters and support their well-being. He also requested respect for his family's privacy and stated that he would make no further comments on the matter.

== Career statistics ==
=== Club ===
As of match played 25 August 2025

Appearances and goals by club, season and competition
Club	Season	League			Cup		Continental		Other		Total	
Club	Season	Division	Apps	Goals	Apps	Goals	Apps	Goals	Apps	Goals	Apps	Goals
Universitario	2011	Peruvian Primera División	11	0	—		3 (Note: Appearance(s) in Copa Sudamericana)	0	—		14	0
Universitario	2012	Peruvian Primera División	26	4	—		—		—		26	4
Villarreal B	2012–13	Segunda División B	16	3	—		—		—		16	3
Villarreal B	2013–14	Segunda División B	28	4	—		—		—		28	4
Villarreal B	Total		44	7	0	0	0	0	—		44	7
Universitario	2014	Peruvian Primera División	16	2	6	1	—		—		22	3
Universitario	2015	Peruvian Primera División	24	3	6	1	3	0	—		33	4
Universitario	2016	Peruvian Primera División	24	8	—		0	0	—		24	8
Universitario	Total		101	17	12	2	6	0	—		119	19
AaB	2016–17	Danish Superliga	18	1	2	1	—		—		20	2
AaB	2017–18	Danish Superliga	29	1	2	1	—		—		31	2
AaB	Total		47	2	4	1	0	0	—		51	4
Morelia	2018–19	Liga MX	24	5	2	0	—		—		26	5
Morelia	2019–20	Liga MX	21	7	0	0	—		—		21	7
Morelia	Total		45	12	2	0	0	0	—		47	12
D.C. United	2020	MLS	13	0	—		—		—		13	0
D.C. United	2021	MLS	16	2	—		—		—		16	2
D.C. United	2022	MLS	12	1	1	0	—		—		13	1
D.C. United	Total		41	3	1	0	—		—		42	3
Atlas	2022–23	Liga MX	22	0	1	0	1 (Note: Appearance in CONCACAF Champions Cup)	0	1 (Note: Appearance in Campeón de Campeones)	0	25	0
Atlas	2024–25	Liga MX	0	0	0	0	0	0	0	0	0	0
Atlas	Total		22	0	1	0	1	0	1	0	25	0
Universitario (loan)	2023	Peruvian Primera División	15	6	0	0	2	1	—		17	6
Universitario (loan)	2024	Peruvian Primera División	32	9	0	0	6 (Note: Appearances in Copa Libertadores)	1	—		38	10
Universitario (loan)	Total		47	15	0	0	8	2	—		55	17
Universitario	2025	Peruvian Primera División	20	4	0	0	7	1	—		27	5
Career total			350	60	20	3	22	2	1	0	410	65

=== International ===
As of match played 10 June 2025

Appearances and goals by national team and year
National team	Year	Apps	Goals
Peru	2013	1	0
Peru	2014	1	0
Peru	2015	1	0
Peru	2016	12	4
Peru	2017	10	4
Peru	2018	13	3
Peru	2019	13	2
Peru	2020	2	0
Peru	2021	4	0
Peru	2022	7	2
Peru	2023	6	0
Peru	2024	10	1
Peru	2025	4	1
Total		84	17

As of 20 March 2025

Scores and results list Peru's goal tally first, score column indicates score after each Flores goal.

List of international goals scored by Edison Flores
No.	Date	Venue	Opponent	Score	Result	Competition
1	23 May 2016	Estadio Nacional, Lima, Peru	Trinidad and Tobago	3–0	4–0	Friendly
2	8 June 2016	University of Phoenix Stadium, Glendale, United States	Ecuador	2–0	2–2	Copa América Centenario
3	11 October 2016	Estadio Nacional Julio Martinez Pradanos, Santiago, Chile	Chile	1–1	1–2	2018 FIFA World Cup qualification
4	10 November 2016	Estadio Defensores del Chaco, Asunción, Paraguay	Paraguay	2–1	4–1	2018 FIFA World Cup qualification
5	28 March 2017	Estadio Nacional, Lima, Peru	Uruguay	2–1	2–1	2018 FIFA World Cup qualification
6	14 June 2017	Estadio Monumental Virgen de Chapi, Arequipa, Peru	Jamaica	1–0	3–1	Friendly
7	31 August 2017	Estadio Monumental "U", Lima, Peru	Bolivia	1–0	2–1	2018 FIFA World Cup qualification
8	5 September 2017	Estadio Olímpico Atahualpa, Quito, Ecuador	Ecuador	1–0	2–1	2018 FIFA World Cup qualification
9	23 March 2018	Hard Rock Stadium, Miami, United States	Croatia	2–0	2–0	Friendly
10	16 October 2018	Rentschler Field, East Hartford, United States	United States	1–1	1–1	Friendly
11	20 November 2018	Estadio Monumental Virgen de Chapi, Arequipa, Peru	Costa Rica	1–0	2–3	Friendly
12	18 June 2019	Estádio do Maracanã, Rio de Janeiro, Brazil	Bolivia	3–1	3–1	2019 Copa América
13	3 July 2019	Arena do Grêmio, Porto Alegre, Brazil	Chile	1–0	3–0	2019 Copa América
14	28 January 2022	Estadio Metropolitano Roberto Meléndez, Barranquilla, Colombia	Colombia	1–0	1–0	2022 FIFA World Cup qualification
15	1 February 2022	Estadio Nacional, Lima, Peru	Ecuador	1–1	1–1	2022 FIFA World Cup qualification
16	14 June 2024	Subaru Park, Chester, United States	El Salvador	1–0	1–0	Friendly
17	20 March 2025	Estadio Nacional, Lima, Peru	Bolivia	3–1	3–1	2026 FIFA World Cup qualification

== Honours ==
Club Universitario de Deportes

- U-20 Copa Libertadores: 2011
- Peruvian Primera División: Apertura 2016, 2023, 2024, 2025

Individual

- U-20 Copa Libertadores Best Player: 2011
