= Luis Llontop =

Peruvian footballer (born 1985)

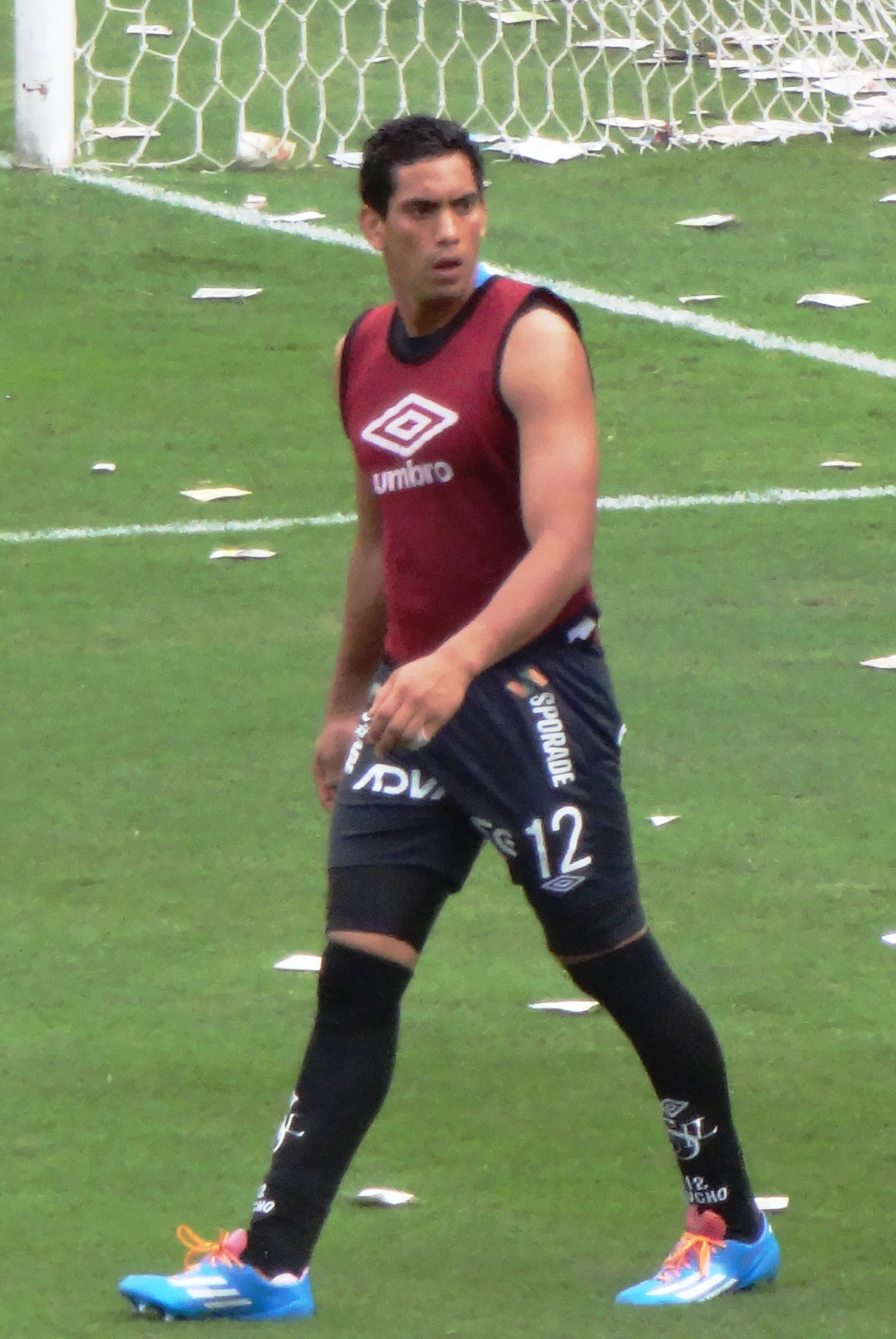

Personal information
- Full name: Luis Ricardo Llontop Godeau
- Date of birth: 2 October 1985 (age 41)
- Place of birth: Lima, Peru
- Height: 1.84 m (6 ft 0 in)
- Position: Goalkeeper

Team information
- Current team: Universitario
- Number: 12

Youth career
- 1998–2006: Universitario

Senior career*
Years	Team	Apps	(Gls)
2007–	Universitario	46	(0)
- * Club domestic league appearances and goals as of 12 July 2012

Luis Ricardo Llontop Godeau (born 2 October 1985) is a Peruvian footballer who plays as a goalkeeper for Universitario de Deportes in the Torneo Descentralizado.

He is currently studying Business Administration in a Peruvian university.

== Honours ==
=== Club ===
Universitario de Deportes

- Apertura: 2008
- Torneo Descentralizado (2): 2009, 2013
