= Antonio Gonzales =

Peruvian footballer (born 1986)

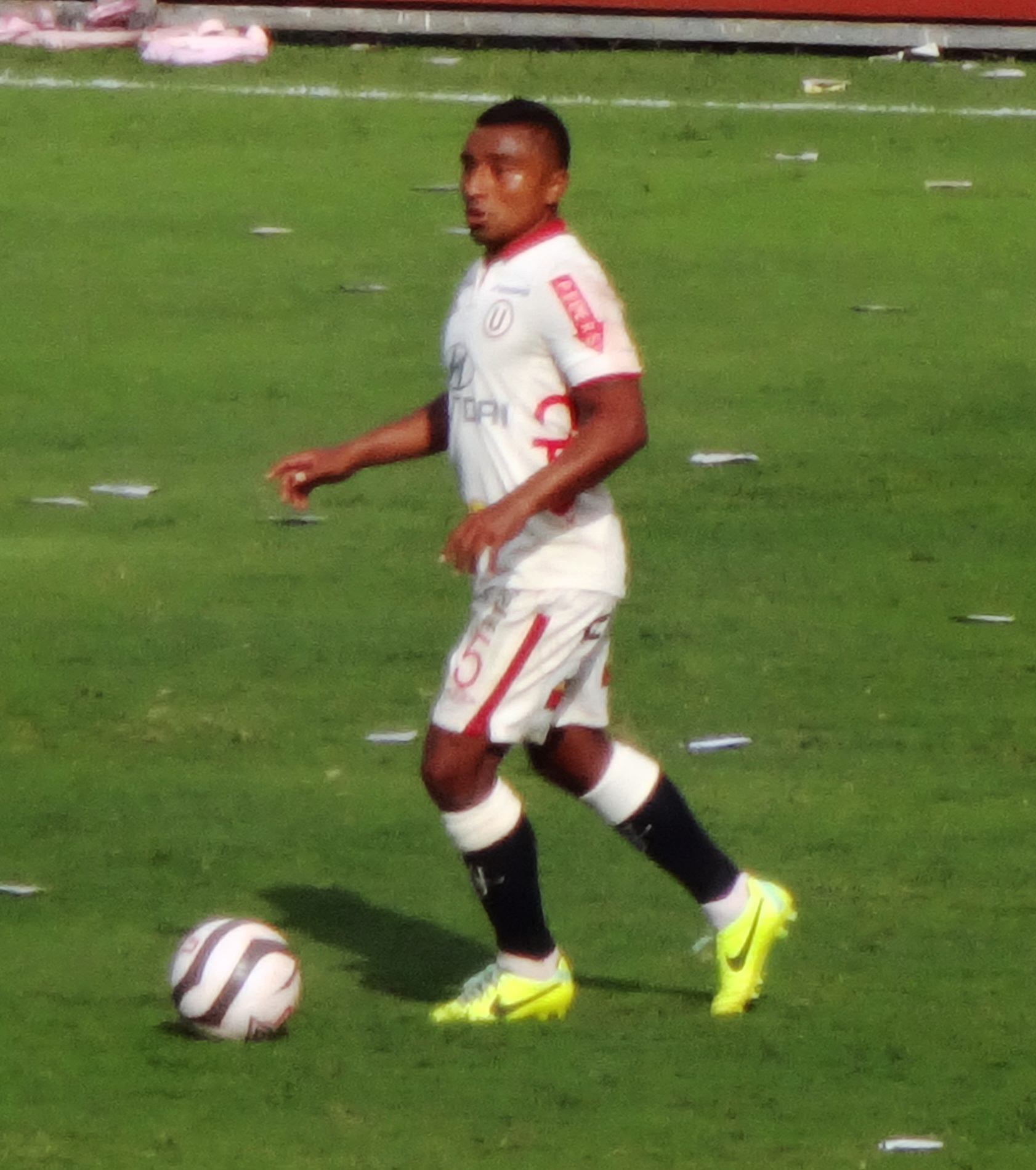

Personal information
- Full name: Antonio Emiliano Gonzales Canchari
- Date of birth: 16 May 1986 (age 40)
- Place of birth: Lima, Peru
- Height: 1.63 m (5 ft 4 in)
- Position: Defensive midfielder

Youth career
- Universitario de Deportes

Senior career*
Years	Team	Apps	(Gls)
2006–2016	Universitario de Deportes	300	(1)
2016	Ayacucho FC	2	(0)
2016–2017	Universidad César Vallejo	21	(1)
2017–2018	Sport Rosario	16	(0)
2020–2021	Pirata F.C.	5	(0)

International career^{‡}
2010–2012	Peru	10	(0)
- * Club domestic league appearances and goals as of 25 September 2011 ‡ National team caps and goals as of 1 October 2011

Antonio "Toñito" Gonzales (born 16 May 1986) is a former Peruvian footballer who last played for Pirata F.C. in the Peruvian second tier. He played as a defensive midfielder.

He was referred to as the successor of José Luis Carranza because of his aggressive style of play, which makes his rivals doubt facing him, despite his shorter height compared to the average. He has also been compared with Arturo Vidal due to his ruthless style of play. In 2008, he had a son and named him Mayer Simão in honor of his former 'Crema' teammate Mayer Candelo and Atlético Madrid midfielder Simão.

== Club career ==
Toñito González was formed as a footballer in the youth levels of Universitario de Deportes, one of the most important and historically relevant clubs of the Peruvian top division. He played for their second team in the 2002/03 season before playing for América de Cochahuayco, which operates as a twin club of Universitario de Deportes in the lower tiers of Peruvian football.

González was promoted to the first team under manager Jorge Amado Nunes during the 2006/07 season, amounting a total of 12 league appearances by the end of it. Until his departure in 2016, González played 214 league games for Universitario de Deportes becoming a fan-favorite and a club legend due to his tangible passion and aggressive defending abilities which earned him 95 yellow cards and 10 red cards throughout his career. Toñito González's only professional goal was as an out-of-the box angled rebound in a 1–1 game against FBC Melgar during the 2013/14 Torneo del Inca in Lima

After a brief and uneventful 3-month spell in Ayacucho FC, González signed for Universidad César Vallejo in August 2016 as the team edged relegation to the Peruvian second division. González's 6 league appearances did not prove to be sufficient to help the team avoid relegation and Universidad César Vallejo lost its slot in the top tier of Peruvian football. In the following season, the club accessed the promotion play-offs but lost the final 3–5 on penalties against Sport Boys in a game where González remained on the bench. Sourly, González left the club in 2017 with 21 games played for the Trujillo team.

== Honours ==
=== Club ===
Universitario de Deportes

- Torneo Descentralizado (2): 2009, 2013
- Apertura: 2008

=== Country ===
Peru national team

- Copa America: Bronze medal 2011
