= Guillermo Tomasevich =

Peruvian footballer (born 1987)

Personal information
- Full name: Guillermo Tomasevich Castañeda
- Date of birth: March 20, 1987 (age 39)
- Place of birth: Lima, Peru
- Height: 1.80 m (5 ft 11 in)
- Positions: Forward; left midfielder

Youth career
- –2007: Deportivo Municipal

Senior career*
Years	Team	Apps	(Gls)
2008	Deportivo Municipal		
2009	Cienciano	9	(2)
2010	Inti Gas	8	(3)
2010	Cienciano	14	(2)
2011–2013	Universitario	20	(2)
2013	Juan Aurich	2	(0)
2014	León de Huánuco	27	(8)
2015–2016	Ayacucho	24	(4)
2016	Deportivo Coopsol	12	(4)
2017-2019	Sport Boys	29	(11)
- * Club domestic league appearances and goals

Guillermo Tomasevich Castañeda (born March 20, 1987) is a Peruvian footballer who plays as a forward.

== Career ==
Tomasevich developed as a footballer in the youth academy of Deportivo Municipal. He was promoted to first team in January 2008 and played in the 2008 Peruvian Second Division season.

In January 2009 Tomasevich joined Cusco giants Cienciano for the start of the 2009 season He made his Peruvian First Division debut that season on 11 April 2009 away to Alianza Lima. Already down two goals, manager Julio Cesar Uribe allowed Tomasevich to enter the match in the 75th minute, but eventually it finished in a 2–0 win for Alianza Lima. In his seventh league match, Tomasevich scored his first goal in the Descentralizado on 9 August 2009 away to Alianza Atletico. Playing in the Campeones del 36 stadium, he entered the match for Jaime Linares in the 86th minute and managed to score his debut goal in the 93rd minute of the match to salvage a 1–1 draw.

On January 5, 2011 Tomasevich joined Universitario de Deportes for the start of the 2011 season and signed a contract for two seasons.

On September 25, 2012 Tomasevich scored his first official goal with Universitario de Deportes against Universidad San Martín de Porres from a header.
