= Werner Schuler =

Peruvian footballer (born 1990)

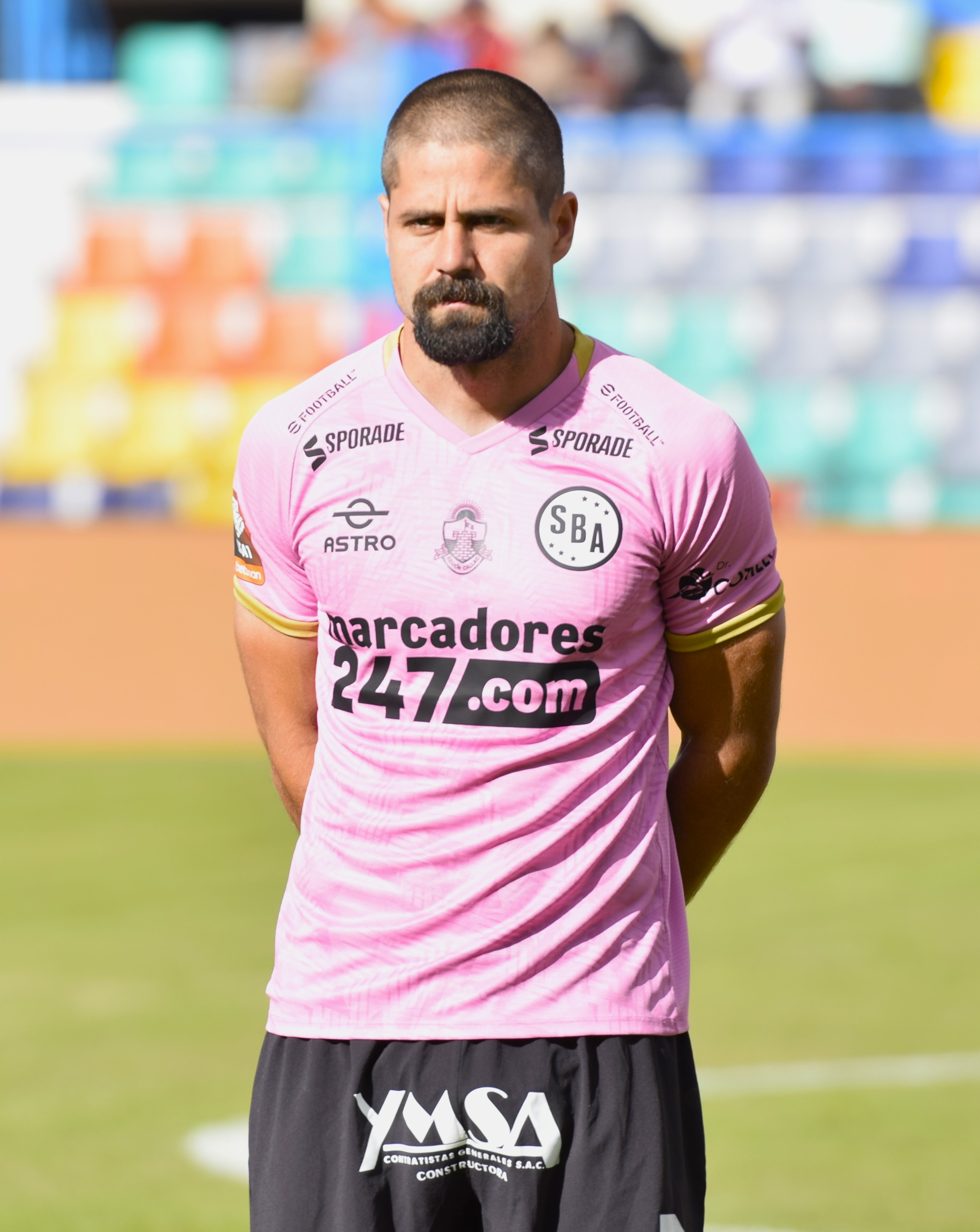
- Schuler with Sport Boys

Personal information
- Full name: Werner Luis Schuler Gamarra
- Date of birth: 27 July 1990 (age 36)
- Place of birth: Asunción, Paraguay
- Height: 1.83 m (6 ft 0 in)
- Position: Centre-back

Team information
- Current team: UTC
- Number: 5

Youth career
- 2005–2008: Regatas Lima
- 2008: Esther Grande Bentín

Senior career*
Years	Team	Apps	(Gls)
2008	Am. Cochahuayco		
2009–2010	Sport Boys	8	(0)
2010–2014	Universitario	37	(1)
2014–2016	Melgar	27	(0)
2016–2021	Universitario	52	(4)
2020–2021	→ Univ. San Martín (loan)	46	(3)
2022–2024	UTC	29	(0)
Medal record
Universitario
Winner	Peruvian League	2013
FBC Melgar
Winner	Peruvian League	2015
- * Club domestic league appearances and goals as of 19:09, 6 October 2022 (UTC)

Werner Luis Schuler Gamarra (born 27 July 1990) is a Peruvian professional footballer who plays as a centre-back for Universidad Técnica de Cajamarca in the Torneo Descentralizado.

== Career ==
Schuler started his senior career in 2008 with América Cochahuayco, a farm team of Universitario de Deportes. There he played under the management of Tito Chumpitaz in the 2008 Segunda División Peruana.

Then in January 2009 he joined Sport Boys. The club was competing in the Segunda División Peruana at the time and finished as champions at the end of the 2009 season. With Sport Boys promoted the following year, Schuler made his Torneo Descentralizado debut on 8 May 2010 in Round 13 at home against Universidad San Martín. Manager Miguel Company placed him in the starting eleven alongside Alexander Callens in the centre of defence, but his debut ended in a 1–0 loss for his side.

== Personal life ==
Schuler was born in Asunción, Paraguay to Peruvian parents of Swiss descent. He also has Swiss nationality.

== Honours ==
Universitario de Deportes

- Torneo Descentralizado: 2013
- U-20 Copa Libertadores: 2011
