= José Mendoza (Peruvian footballer) =

Peruvian footballer (born 1982)

Personal information
- Full name: José Adolfo Mendoza Zambrano
- Date of birth: 24 July 1982 (age 44)
- Place of birth: Pisco, Peru
- Height: 1.78 m (5 ft 10 in)
- Position: Defensive midfielder

Senior career*
Years	Team	Apps	(Gls)
2002	América Cochahuayco		
2003–2006	Universitario	128	(2)
2007	Sporting Cristal	21	(1)
2007	Veria	10	(0)
2008	Ethnikos Asteras	6	(0)
2008	Juan Aurich	19	(1)
2009–2010	Inti Gas Deportes	67	(8)
2011	Universitario	13	(0)
2012–2013	Sport Huancayo	44	(2)
2014	San Simón	32	(1)
2015–2017	UT Cajamarca	65	(4)
2017	Sport Victoria	20	(1)
2018	Alianza Atlético	28	(1)
2019	Comerciantes Unidos	12	(0)
2020	Santa Rosa PNP	1	(0)

International career
2005	Peru	6	(0)
- * Club domestic league appearances and goals

José Adolfo Mendoza Zambrano (born 24 July 1982) is a Peruvian former professional footballer who played as a defensive midfielder.

== Club career ==
Mendoza played for multiple clubs in Peru as well as Greece. He started at América Cochahuayco in 2002 and was later promoted to Universitario, playing for them until 2006. Subsequently, he played for Sporting Cristal in 2007 before moving to Greece to play for Veria and Ethnikos Asteras. He returned to Peru to play with newly promoted Juan Aurich in 2008. He then signed with Inti Gas Deportes—another newly promoted team—and played for two years in Ayacucho. In 2011, he returned to his original club Universitario.

== International career ==
Mendoza debuted with the Peru national team against Japan for the 2005 Kirin Cup on 22 May 2005.
