= Martín Morel =

Argentine footballer

Personal information
- Full name: Martín Gerardo Morel
- Date of birth: November 5, 1980 (age 45)
- Place of birth: Rosario, Argentina
- Height: 1.70 m (5 ft 7 in)
- Position: Midfielder

Team information
- Current team: Cúcuta Deportivo

Youth career
- Atlético Sanford
- Atlético Chabás

Senior career*
Years	Team	Apps	(Gls)
2006–2010	Sportivo Las Parejas	9	(9)
2006–2010	Tigre	88	(26)
2010	Deportivo Cali	14	(11)
2011–2012	Universitario de Deportes	17	(1)
2012	→ All Boys (loan)	11	(1)
2012–2013	All Boys	15	(1)
2013–2014	Atlético Tucumán	13	(3)
2014–2015	Cúcuta Deportivo	24	(6)
2016–2017	Fénix de Pilar	4	(0)
- * Club domestic league appearances and goals

Martín Gerardo Morel (born 5 November 1980 in Rosario) is a retired Argentine football midfielder.

== Career ==
Morel was a late developer, not playing professionally until the age of 25. Morel was discovered playing for Sportivo Las Parejas and joined Tigre in 2006.

In his first season with Tigre Morel helped the club to gain promotion to the Argentine Primera. The Apertura 2007 was Tigre's first season in the Primera since 1980, and Morel's first taste of top flight football. Morel was not a regular in the first team, but chipped in with three goals in his seven appearances. The club finished in 2nd place which was the highest league finish in their history. During the Apertura 2008 Morel was an important part of the Tigre squad that again reached the runner-up position. He scored a total of 13 goals throughout the tournament.

In the summer 2010 Martin Morel signed for Colombian team Deportivo Cali. He will play the 2010/11 season in Liga Postobón.

He announced his arrival at Deportivo Cali with a superb hat-trick in their 5–3 victory over Once Caldas.
