= 2018 in Peruvian football =

Football in Peru
- Season: 2018

Men's football
- Torneo Descentralizado: Sporting Cristal
- Segunda División: Universidad César Vallejo
- Supercopa Movistar: Alianza Lima
- Copa Perú: Pirata

Women's football
- Copa Perú: Municipalidad de Majes

The 2018 season in Peruvian football included all the matches of the different national male and female teams, as well as the local club tournaments, and the participation of these in international competitions in which representatives of the country's teams had participated.

== National teams ==
=== Peru national football team ===
==== Kits ====
FIFA World Cup

Home	Away

Friendlies

Home	Away

==== FIFA World Cup ====
Group stage

Pos	Team	Pld	W	D	L	GF	GA	GD	Pts	Qualification
1	France	3	2	1	0	3	1	+2	7	Advance to knockout stage
2	Denmark	3	1	2	0	2	1	+1	5	Advance to knockout stage
3	Peru	3	1	0	2	2	2	0	3	
4	Australia	3	0	1	2	2	5	−3	1	

Source: FIFA
Rules for classification: Group stage tiebreakers

16 June FIFA World Cup Group C	Peru	0–1	Denmark	Saransk
19:00 MSK (UTC+3)		Report	Poulsen 59'	Stadium: Mordovia Arena; Attendance: 40,502; Referee: Bakary Gassama (GAM)

21 June FIFA World Cup Group C	France	1–0	Peru	Yekaterinburg
20:00 YEKT (UTC+5)	Mbappé 34'	Report		Stadium: Central Stadium; Attendance: 32,789; Referee: Mohammed Abdulla Hassan Mohamed (UAE)

26 June FIFA World Cup Group C	Australia	0–2	Peru	Sochi
17:00 MSK (UTC+3)		Report	Carrillo 18'; Guerrero 50'	Stadium: Fisht Olympic Stadium; Attendance: 44,073; Referee: Sergei Karasev (RUS)

==== Friendlies ====
24 March Friendly	Peru	2–0	Croatia	Miami Gardens
20:30 EDT (UTC−4)	Carrillo 12'; Flores 48'	Report		Stadium: Hard Rock Stadium; Attendance: 46,893; Referee: Ismail Elfath (USA)

27 March Friendly	Peru	3–1	Iceland	Harrison
20:00 EDT (UTC−4)	Tapia 3'; Ruidíaz 58'; Farfán 75'	Report	Fjóluson 22'	Stadium: Red Bull Arena; Attendance: 25,219; Referee: Ted Unkel (USA)

29 May Friendly	Peru	2–0	Scotland	Lima
20:00 PET (UTC−5)	Cueva 37' (pen.); Farfán 47'	Report		Stadium: Estadio Nacional; Attendance: 40,000; Referee: Fernando Guerrero (MEX)

3 June Friendly	Saudi Arabia	0–3	Peru	St. Gallen
20:00 CEST (UTC+2)		Report	Carrillo 20'; Guerrero 41', 64'	Stadium: kybunpark Attendance: 18,053; Referee: Fedayi San (SUI)

9 June Friendly	Sweden	0–0	Peru	Gothenburg
20:15 CEST (UTC+2)		Report		Stadium: Ullevi; Attendance: 32,163; Referee: Svein Oddvar Moen (NOR)

6 September Friendly	Netherlands	2–1	Peru	Amsterdam
20:45 CEST (UTC+2)	Depay 60', 83'	Report	Aquino 13'	Stadium: Johan Cruyff Arena; Attendance: 40,127; Referee: Tobias Stieler (GER)

9 September Friendly	Germany	2–1	Peru	Sinsheim
20:45 CEST (UTC+2)	Brandt 25'; Schulz 85'	Report	Advíncula 22'	Stadium: Rhein-Neckar-Arena; Attendance: 25,494; Referee: Robert Schörgenhofer (AUT)

12 October Friendly	Peru	3–0	Chile	Miami Gardens
20:30 EDT (UTC−4)	Roco 64' (o.g.); Aquino 75', 86'	Report		Stadium: Hard Rock Stadium; Attendance: 34,016; Referee: Armando Villarreal (USA)

16 October Friendly	United States	1–1	Peru	East Hartford
20:00 EDT (UTC−4)	Sargent 49'	Report	Flores 86'	Stadium: Pratt & Whitney Stadium; Attendance: 24,959; Referee: Ivan Barton (SLV)

15 November Friendly	Peru	0–2	Ecuador	Lima
20:30 PET (UTC−5)		Report	A. Valencia 47'; E. Valencia 74'	Stadium: Estadio Nacional; Attendance: 45,000; Referee: Leodán González (URU)

20 November Friendly	Peru	2–3	Costa Rica	Arequipa
19:30 PET (UTC−5)	Flores 20'; Farfán 73'	Report	McDonald 41'; Cruz 54'; Campbell 77' (pen.)	Stadium: Virgen de Chapi; Attendance: 40,000; Referee: Carlos Orbe (ECU)

=== Peru women's national football team ===
==== Copa América ====
Group stage

Pos	Team	Pld	W	D	L	GF	GA	GD	Pts	Qualification
1	Colombia	4	3	1	0	16	2	+14	10	Final stage
2	Chile (H)	4	2	2	0	8	2	+6	8	Final stage
3	Paraguay	4	2	1	1	7	7	0	7	2019 Pan American Games
4	Uruguay	4	0	1	3	2	11	−9	1	
5	Peru	4	0	1	3	1	12	−11	1	

Source: CONMEBOL
Rules for classification: First stage tiebreakers
(H) Hosts

6 April 2018	Paraguay	3–0	Peru	Estadio La Portada, La Serena
16:45	Peña 70'; J. Martínez 84'; Peralta 90+3'	Report		Referee: Sirley Cornejo (Bolivia)

8 April 2018	Uruguay	1–1	Peru	Estadio La Portada, La Serena
16:45	Badell 58'	Report	Martínez 37'	Referee: Salomé di Iorio (Argentina)

10 April 2018	Colombia	3–0	Peru	Estadio La Portada, La Serena
16:45	Usme 23'; Santos 54'; Echeverri 83'	Report		Referee: Sirley Cornejo (Bolivia)

12 April 2018	Peru	0–5	Chile	Estadio La Portada, La Serena
19:00		Report	Aedo 28', 65'; López 38'; Lara 62'; Rojas 85'	Referee: Emikar Calderas (Venezuela)

== CONMEBOL competitions ==
=== CONMEBOL Libertadores ===
==== First stage ====
22 January 2018
21:15 UTC−4

Oriente Petrolero (Bolivia)	2–0	(Peru) Universitario
Sánchez 27'; Freitas 79'	Report

Estadio Ramón Tahuichi Aguilera, Santa Cruz de la Sierra
Attendance: 21,500
Referee: Carlos Orbe (Ecuador)
26 January 2018
20:45 UTC−5

Universitario (Peru)	3–1	(Bolivia) Oriente Petrolero
Corzo 7', 60'; Chávez 65'	Report	Paredes 84'

Estadio Monumental "U", Lima
Attendance: 17,000
Referee: Esteban Ostojich (Uruguay)

==== Second stage ====
30 January 2018
21:30 UTC−3

Santiago Wanderers (Chile)	1–1	(Peru) Melgar
Viotti 1'	Report	Cuesta 45+2'

Estadio Elías Figueroa Brander, Valparaíso
Attendance: 7,435
Referee: Alexis Herrera (Venezuela)
6 February 2018
19:30 UTC−5

Melgar (Peru)	0–1	(Chile) Santiago Wanderers
	Report	Medel 44'

Estadio Monumental de la UNSA, Arequipa
Attendance: 7,500
Referee: Ricardo Marques (Brazil)

==== Group stage ====
Group F

Pos	Team	Pld	W	D	L	GF	GA	GD	Pts	Qualification	SAN	EST	NAC	RGA
1	(Brazil) Santos	6	3	1	2	6	4	+2	10	Round of 16	—	2–0	3–1	0–0
2	(Argentina) Estudiantes	6	2	2	2	6	4	+2	8	Round of 16	0–1	—	3–1	3–0
3	(Uruguay) Nacional	6	2	2	2	7	6	+1	8	Copa Sudamericana	1–0	0–0	—	4–0
4	(Peru) Real Garcilaso	6	1	3	2	2	7	−5	6		2–0	0–0	0–0	—

Source: CONMEBOL
1 March 2018
17:15 UTC−5

Real Garcilaso (Peru)	2–0	(Brazil) Santos
Vidales 7'; Ramúa 88'	Report

Estadio Garcilaso, Cusco
Attendance: 35,190
Referee: Gery Vargas (Bolivia)
14 March 2018
19:15 UTC−3

Estudiantes (Argentina)	3–0	(Peru) Real Garcilaso
Melano 52'; Pavone 74' (pen.), 86'	Report

Estadio Ciudad de La Plata, La Plata
Attendance: 35,932
Referee: Alexis Herrera (Venezuela)
3 April 2018
17:15 UTC−5

Real Garcilaso (Peru)	0–0	(Uruguay) Nacional
	Report

Estadio Garcilaso, Cusco
Attendance: 33,709
Referee: Wilmar Roldán (Colombia)
25 April 2018
19:15 UTC−3

Nacional (Uruguay)	4–0	(Peru) Real Garcilaso
Rodríguez 39'; Corujo 80'; Barcia 85'; Bergessio 88'	Report

Estadio Gran Parque Central, Montevideo
Attendance: 25,000
Referee: José Argote (Venezuela)
1 May 2018
17:15 UTC−5

Real Garcilaso (Peru)	0–0	(Argentina) Estudiantes
	Report

Estadio Garcilaso, Cusco
Attendance: 29,801
Referee: Julio Bascuñán (Chile)
24 May 2018
19:15 UTC−3

Santos (Brazil)	0–0	(Peru) Real Garcilaso
	Report

Estádio Urbano Caldeira, Santos
Attendance: 5,016
Referee: Alexis Herrera (Venezuela)

Group H

Pos	Team	Pld	W	D	L	GF	GA	GD	Pts	Qualification	PAL	BOC	JUN	ALI
1	(Brazil) Palmeiras	6	5	1	0	14	3	+11	16	Round of 16	—	1–1	3–1	2–0
2	(Argentina) Boca Juniors	6	2	3	1	8	4	+4	9	Round of 16	0–2	—	1–0	5–0
3	(Colombia) Junior	6	2	1	3	5	8	−3	7	Copa Sudamericana	0–3	1–1	—	1–0
4	(Peru) Alianza Lima	6	0	1	5	1	13	−12	1		1–3	0–0	0–2	—

Source: CONMEBOL
1 March 2018
19:30 UTC−5

Alianza Lima (Peru)	0–0	(Argentina) Boca Juniors
	Report

Estadio Nacional, Lima
Attendance: 36,503
Referee: Daniel Fedorczuk (Uruguay)
3 April 2018
21:30 UTC−3

Palmeiras (Brazil)	2–0	(Peru) Alianza Lima
Thiago Martins 10'; Borja 46'	Report

Allianz Parque, São Paulo
Attendance: 30,456
Referee: José Argote (Venezuela)
19 April 2018
19:30 UTC−5

Alianza Lima (Peru)	0–2	(Colombia) Junior
	Report	Chará 9'; Álvez 82'

Estadio Alejandro Villanueva, Lima
Attendance: 10,000
Referee: Roddy Zambrano (Ecuador)
26 April 2018
19:30 UTC−5

Junior (Colombia)	1–0	(Peru) Alianza Lima
Ruiz 60'	Report

Estadio Metropolitano Roberto Meléndez, Barranquilla
Attendance: 29,001
Referee: Alexis Herrera (Venezuela)
3 May 2018
19:30 UTC−5

Alianza Lima (Peru)	1–3	(Brazil) Palmeiras
Cruzado 71' (pen.)	Report	Willian 19'; Hyoran 31'; Borja 66'

Estadio Alejandro Villanueva, Lima
Attendance: 15,873
Referee: Gery Vargas (Bolivia)
16 May 2018
21:45 UTC−3

Boca Juniors (Argentina)	5–0	(Peru) Alianza Lima
Cardona 11'; Fabra 19'; Ábila 34', 41'; Tévez 54'	Report

Estadio Alberto J. Armando, Buenos Aires
Attendance: 47,854
Referee: Mario Díaz de Vivar (Paraguay)

=== CONMEBOL Sudamericana ===
==== First stage ====
21 February 2018
19:15 UTC−3

Lanús (Argentina)	4–2	(Peru) Sporting Cristal
Vides 15'; Acosta 28'; Silva 31' (pen.); Di Renzo 85'	Report	Herrera 21', 52' (pen.)

Estadio Ciudad de Lanús, Lanús
Attendance: 10,000
Referee: Gery Vargas (Bolivia)
7 March 2018
19:45 UTC−5

Sporting Cristal (Peru)	2–1	(Argentina) Lanús
Herrera 7' (pen.); Calcaterra 90+2'	Report	García Guerreño 85'

Estadio Nacional, Lima
Attendance: 25,000
Referee: Anderson Daronco (Brazil)

20 February 2018
17:15 UTC−5

Sport Rosario (Peru)	0–0	(Uruguay) Cerro
	Report

Estadio Rosas Pampa, Huaraz
Attendance: 8,000
Referee: Andrés Rojas (Colombia)
7 March 2018
19:15 UTC−3

Cerro (Uruguay)	2–0	(Peru) Sport Rosario
López 65'; Zazpe 73'	Report

Estadio Luis Tróccoli, Montevideo
Attendance: 3,000
Referee: Éber Aquino (Paraguay)

13 February 2018
17:15 UTC−5

UTC (Peru)	2–0	(Uruguay) Rampla Juniors
Ponce 33'; Cardoza 61'	Report

Estadio Miguel Grau, Callao
Attendance: 1,000
Referee: Dewson Freitas (Brazil)
8 March 2018
19:15 UTC−3

Rampla Juniors (Uruguay)	4–0	(Peru) UTC
Lalinde 13'; Olivera 21'; Igor Paim 59'; Rigoleto 83'	Report

Estadio Luis Franzini, Montevideo
Attendance: 1,500
Referee: Carlos Orbe (Ecuador)

15 February 2018
21:30 UTC−3

Unión Española (Chile)	0–0	(Peru) Sport Huancayo
	Report

Estadio Santa Laura, Independencia
Attendance: 3,602
Referee: Omar Ponce (Ecuador)
8 March 2018
19:45 UTC−5

Sport Huancayo (Peru)	3–0	(Chile) Unión Española
Trujillo 20'; Monsalvo 49'; Valverde 78'	Report

Estadio Huancayo, Huancayo
Attendance: 4,000
Referee: Jesús Valenzuela (Venezuela)

==== Second stage ====
17 July 2018
18:30 UTC−4

Caracas (Venezuela)	2–0	(Peru) Sport Huancayo
Díaz 6'; Martins 81' (pen.)	Report

Estadio Metropolitano de Cabudare, Cabudare
Referee: Ivo Méndez (Bolivia)
24 July 2018
17:30 UTC−5

Sport Huancayo (Peru)	3–4	(Venezuela) Caracas
Salinas 13'; Valverde 41'; Sauñe 86'	Report	Díaz 27', 46', 68'; Aristeguieta 90'

Estadio Huancayo, Huancayo
Referee: Nicolás Gallo (Colombia)

== Men's football ==
=== Supercopa Movistar ===
31 January 2018
15:30

Alianza Lima	1–0	Sport Boys
Carlos Ascues 65' (pen.)

Estadio Nacional, Lima
Referee: Augusto Menéndez

=== Torneo Descentralizado ===
==== Torneo de Verano ====
Finals

6 May 2018
15:30
First leg

Sport Huancayo	1–1	Sporting Cristal
Neumann 65' (pen.)	Report	Costa 37'

Estadio Huancayo, Huancayo
Attendance: 8,352
Referee: Michael Espinoza
12 May 2018
20:15
Second leg

Sporting Cristal	1–0	Sport Huancayo
Revoredo 59'	Report

Estadio Nacional, Lima
Attendance: 19,936
Referee: Diego Haro

Sporting Cristal won the cup after defeating Sport Huancayo.

==== Torneo Apertura ====
Pos	Team	Pld	W	D	L	GF	GA	GD	Pts	Qualification
1	Sporting Cristal	15	9	5	1	27	7	+20	32	Advance to Playoffs and qualification to Copa Libertadores
2	Alianza Lima	15	8	3	4	24	16	+8	27	
3	Real Garcilaso	15	8	2	5	19	19	0	26	
4	Deportivo Municipal	15	7	3	5	21	16	+5	24	
5	UTC	15	6	6	3	19	15	+4	24	
6	Melgar	15	6	6	3	23	20	+3	24	
7	Unión Comercio	15	6	5	4	17	16	+1	23	
8	Binacional	15	6	3	6	15	14	+1	21	
9	Sport Boys	15	4	7	4	20	21	−1	19	
10	Sport Huancayo	15	4	6	5	16	15	+1	18	
11	Universitario	15	4	6	5	18	21	−3	18	
12	Sport Rosario (Note: Sport Rosario were deducted 4 points for an outstanding debt.)	15	6	3	6	21	24	−3	17	
13	Cantolao	15	4	5	6	21	27	−6	17	
14	Universidad San Martín	15	2	7	6	20	23	−3	13	
15	Ayacucho	15	3	3	9	17	21	−4	12	
16	Comerciantes Unidos	15	0	4	11	10	33	−23	4	

Source: ADFP, Soccerway
Rules for classification: 1) Points; 2) Goal difference; 3) Goals for; 4) Drawing of lots; 5) Play-off (only if needed to decide first place).
If two teams are tied in points for first place: 2) Play-off.

==== Torneo Clausura ====
Pos	Team	Pld	W	D	L	GF	GA	GD	Pts	Qualification
1	Melgar	15	9	3	3	21	13	+8	30	Advance to Playoffs and qualification to Copa Libertadores
2	Alianza Lima	15	8	3	4	20	14	+6	27	
3	Ayacucho	15	7	5	3	30	25	+5	26	
4	Universitario	15	8	2	5	20	17	+3	26	
5	Sporting Cristal	15	7	3	5	37	14	+23	24	
6	Unión Comercio	15	7	2	6	29	25	+4	23	
7	Universidad San Martín	15	6	4	5	20	20	0	22	
8	Real Garcilaso	15	5	6	4	26	22	+4	21	
9	Cantolao (Note: Cantolao were deducted 2 points for an outstanding debt.)	15	7	1	7	18	22	−4	20	
10	Deportivo Municipal (Note: Deportivo Municipal were deducted 1 point for an outstanding debt.)	15	6	3	6	15	19	−4	20	
11	Sport Boys	15	5	3	7	21	23	−2	18	
12	Comerciantes Unidos (Note: Comerciantes Unidos were deducted 1 point for an outstanding debt.)	15	5	3	7	15	19	−4	17	
13	Binacional	15	5	2	8	14	25	−11	17	
14	UTC (Note: UTC were deducted 1 point for an outstanding debt.)	15	4	5	6	14	14	0	16	
15	Sport Huancayo	15	3	7	5	19	22	−3	16	
16	Sport Rosario (Note: Sport Rosario were deducted 3 points for an outstanding debt.)	15	1	2	12	10	35	−25	2	

Source: ADFP, Soccerway
Rules for classification: 1) Points; 2) Goal difference; 3) Goals for; 4) Drawing of lots; 5) Play-off (only if needed to decide first place).
If two teams are tied in points for first place: 2) Play-off.

==== Aggregate table ====
Pos	Team	Pld	W	D	L	GF	GA	GD	Pts	Qualification
1	Sporting Cristal (Note: Sporting Cristal were awarded 2 points for winning the 2018 Torneo de Promoción y Reserva.) (C)	44	26	11	7	106	36	+70	91	Qualification to Playoffs and Copa Libertadores group stage
2	Melgar	44	21	16	7	64	46	+18	79	Qualification to Playoffs and Copa Libertadores second stage
3	Alianza Lima (Note: Alianza Lima were awarded 1 point for being 2018 Torneo de Promoción y Reserva runners-up.)	44	21	10	13	60	47	+13	74	Qualification to Playoffs and Copa Libertadores group stage
4	Real Garcilaso	44	19	10	15	66	64	+2	67	Qualification to Copa Libertadores first stage
5	Deportivo Municipal (Note: Deportivo Municipal were deducted 1 point for an outstanding debt.)	44	19	8	17	60	56	+4	64	Qualification to Copa Sudamericana first stage
6	Sport Huancayo	44	15	16	13	64	57	+7	61	Qualification to Copa Sudamericana first stage
7	UTC (Note: UTC were deducted 1 point for an outstanding debt.)	44	15	16	13	47	48	−1	60	Qualification to Copa Sudamericana first stage
8	Binacional	44	16	11	17	47	56	−9	59	Qualification to Copa Sudamericana first stage
9	Universitario	44	14	15	15	54	59	−5	57	
10	Unión Comercio	44	15	10	19	61	69	−8	55	
11	Universidad San Martín	44	12	18	14	60	61	−1	54	
12	Cantolao (Note: Cantolao were deducted 2 points for an outstanding debt.)	44	15	11	18	53	62	−9	54	
13	Ayacucho	44	14	10	20	69	80	−11	52	
14	Sport Boys	44	12	14	18	56	65	−9	50	
15	Sport Rosario (Note: Sport Rosario were deducted 7 points for outstanding debts.) (R)	44	13	7	24	54	80	−26	39	Relegation to 2019 Liga 2
16	Comerciantes Unidos (Note: Comerciantes Unidos were deducted 1 point for an outstanding debt.) (R)	44	9	9	26	43	78	−35	35	Relegation to 2019 Liga 2

Source: ADFP
Rules for classification: 1) Points; 2) Goal difference; 3) Goals for; 4) Drawing of lots; 5) Play-off (only if needed to decide teams for relegation).
If two teams are tied in points for penultimate place: 2) Play-off.
(C) Champions; (R) Relegated

==== Semi-final ====
December 2, 2018
16:00
First Leg

Alianza Lima	3–3	Melgar
Affonso 68'; Quevedo 69'; Fuentes 77'	Report	Sánchez 24'; Gonzáles 31'; Loyola 64'

Estadio Alejandro Villanueva, Lima
Attendance: 28,905
Referee: Kevin Ortega
December 6, 2018
20:00
Second Leg

Melgar	2–2	Alianza Lima
Cuesta 33'; Carmona 61'	Report	Posito 17', 79'
Penalties
Etchemaite (penalty missed); Biancucchi (penalty missed); Miguez (penalty missed); Arce (penalty missed)	0–2	(penalty scored) Ramírez; (penalty missed) Hohberg; (penalty scored) Posito

Estadio Monumental Virgen de Chapi, Arequipa
Attendance: 30,177
Referee: Joel Alarcón

==== Final ====
December 12, 2018
20:00
First Leg

Alianza Lima	1–4	Sporting Cristal
Adrianzén 83'	Report	López 5'; Revoredo 16'; Costa 85'; Pacheco 90'

Estadio Alejandro Villanueva, Lima
Attendance: 30,266
Referee: Diego Haro
December 16, 2018
16:00
Second Leg

Sporting Cristal	3–0	Alianza Lima
Cazulo 14'; Costa 27'; Herrera 72'	Report

Estadio Nacional, Lima
Attendance: 34,635
Referee: Víctor Hugo Carrillo

Sporting Cristal won the cup after defeating Alianza Lima.

=== Segunda División ===
==== League table ====
Pos	Team	Pld	W	D	L	GF	GA	GD	Pts	Qualification
1	Universidad César Vallejo	28	19	5	4	55	19	+36	62	Advance to Liguilla
2	Carlos A. Mannucci	28	16	7	5	66	30	+36	55	Advance to Liguilla
3	Cienciano	28	17	4	7	63	30	+33	55	Advance to Liguilla
4	Unión Huaral	28	14	6	8	58	39	+19	48	Advance to Liguilla
5	Deportivo Hualgayoc (Note: Hualgayoc was disqualified from the play-off because of financial problems.)	28	13	9	6	49	38	+11	48	
6	Juan Aurich	28	14	5	9	51	27	+24	47	Advance to Liguilla
7	Alianza Atlético	28	14	5	9	48	37	+11	47	Advance to Liguilla
8	Atlético Grau	28	12	6	10	58	42	+16	42	Advance to Liguilla
9	Deportivo Coopsol	28	9	10	9	46	32	+14	37	
10	Cultural Santa Rosa	28	11	4	13	38	36	+2	37	
11	Los Caimanes	28	7	6	15	38	57	−19	27	
12	Sport Victoria	28	6	7	15	34	54	−20	25	
13	Sport Loreto	28	6	6	16	38	68	−30	24	
14	Alfredo Salinas	28	5	6	17	25	66	−41	21	Relegation to 2019 Copa Perú
15	Serrato Pacasmayo	28	2	4	22	23	115	−92	10	Relegation to 2019 Copa Perú

Source: ADFP-SD - official site
Rules for classification: 1) points; 2) goal difference; 3) goals scored; 4) draw.

==== Third-place play-off ====
25 November 2018

Juan Aurich	2–1	Cienciano

2 December 2018

Cienciano	3–1	Juan Aurich

==== Final ====
25 November 2018

Carlos A. Mannucci	1–1	Universidad César Vallejo

2 December 2018

Universidad César Vallejo	3–1	Carlos A. Mannucci

Universidad César Vallejo won the cup after defeating Carlos A. Mannucci.

=== Copa Perú ===
==== Final group stage ====
Pos	Team	Pld	W	D	L	GF	GA	GD	Pts	Qualification
1	Pirata	3	2	0	1	11	3	+8	6	2019 Liga 1
2	Alianza Universidad	3	2	0	1	8	4	+4	6	Promotion Play-off
3	Santos	3	1	0	2	5	10	−5	3	Promotion Play-off
4	UDA	3	1	0	2	2	9	−7	3	

Source: Dechalaca.com
Rules for classification: 1) points; 2) goal difference; 3) goals scored; 4) draw.

Promotion

The best placed team, Pirata FC, was promoted to the first level the following year.

== Women's football ==
=== Copa Peru ===
Final

20 December 2018
Final

Municipalidad de Majes	1–1	JC Sport Girls
Penalties
	7-5

Municipalidad de Majes won the cup after defeating JC Sport Girls.
