= 2018 FBC Melgar season =

FBC Melgar
2018 season
- Manager: Enrique Meza (Start Season until 29 April 2018); Oscar Gambetta (1 May 2018 until 26 May 2018); Hernán Torres (24 May 2018 until End Season)
- Stadium: Monumental Virgen de Chapi
- Torneo Descentralizado: Torneo de Verano: Second (2°) Group B Torneo Apertura: Sixth (6°); Torneo Clausura: First (1°) Champion; Aggregate Table: Second (2°); Play-offs: Third National (3°)
- Copa Libertadores: Second stage
- Top goalscorer: League: Bernardo Cuesta (13); All: Bernardo Cuesta (14); Omar Tejeda (9); Patricio Arce (5); Joao Villamarín (5); Alexis Arias (5); Emanuel Biancucchi (5)
- Biggest win: 0–4 vs Deportivo Binacional Torneo Clausura Match 4 (22 September 2018, Away); 3–0 vs Ayacucho FC Torneo Apertura Match 2 (25 May 2018, Home)
- Biggest defeat: 4–0 vs Deportivo Municipal Torneo Apertura Match 9 (29 July 2018, Away); 3–0 vs UTC Torneo Clausura Match 13 (8 November 2018, Away)
Home colours	Away colours	Third colours

The 2018 FBC Melgar season were the One-Hundred-Fourth (104.º) of the club from its foundation in 1915, Forty-Nine (49) participations in the top-flight of Peruvian Primera División (of 102 Editions) with denomination Torneo Descentralizado. In Previous Season the club qualified as 3rd Place agregated of the 2017 Torneo Descentralizado.

Melgar were a of sixteen (16) clubs in the Fifty-Third edition (53.º) Torneo Descentralizado, the competition most important of the Peruvian football. The club played the Peruvian Primera División and the Copa Libertadores for Fifth (5th) Time.

== Torneo de Verano ==
=== Group stage (Group B) ===
Pos	Team	Pld	W	D	L	GF	GA	GD	Pts	Qualification	SHU	MEL	BIN	MUN	RGA	CAN	SBA	UCO
1	Sport Huancayo	14	8	3	3	29	20	+9	27	Advance to Finals	—	1–1	—	—	—	—	—	—
2	Melgar	14	6	7	1	20	13	+7	25		2–1	—	1–1	2–0	1–2	0–0	2–1	2–1
3	Binacional	14	5	6	3	18	17	+1	21		—	2–2	—	—	—	—	—	—
4	Deportivo Municipal	14	6	2	6	24	21	+3	20		—	1–3	—	—	—	—	—	—
5	Real Garcilaso	14	6	2	6	21	23	−2	20		—	0–0	—	—	—	—	—	—
6	Cantolao	14	4	5	5	14	13	+1	17		—	1–2	—	—	—	—	—	—
7	Sport Boys	14	3	4	7	15	21	−6	13		—	1–1	—	—	—	—	—	—
8	Unión Comercio	14	2	3	9	15	28	−13	9		—	1–1	—	—	—	—	—	—

Source: ADFP, Soccerway
Legend: Blue = home team win; Yellow = draw; Red = away team win.
Rules for classification: 1) Points; 2) Goal difference; 3) Goals for; 4) Drawing of lots.

== Torneo Apertura ==
Pos	Team	Pld	W	D	L	GF	GA	GD	Pts
5	UTC	15	6	6	3	19	15	+4	24
6	Melgar	15	6	6	3	23	20	+3	24
7	Unión Comercio	15	6	5	4	17	16	+1	23

=== Results ===
Home \ Away	ALI	AYA	BIN	CAN	COM	MUN	MEL	RGA	SBA	SHU	SRO	CRI	UCO	USM	UNI	UTC
Alianza Lima	—	—	—	—	—	—	—	—	—	—	—	—	—	—	—	—
Ayacucho	—	—	—	—	—	—	—	—	—	—	—	—	—	—	—	—
Binacional	—	—	—	—	—	—	—	—	—	—	—	—	—	—	—	—
Cantolao	—	—	—	—	—	—	1–1	—	—	—	—	—	—	—	—	—
Comerciantes Unidos	—	—	—	—	—	—	2–2	—	—	—	—	—	—	—	—	—
Deportivo Municipal	—	—	—	—	—	—	4–0	—	—	—	—	—	—	—	—	—
Melgar	2–0	3–0	2–1	—	—	—	—	1–0	2–2	—	—	—	—	3–2	—	3–3
Real Garcilaso	—	—	—	—	—	—	—	—	—	—	—	—	—	—	—	—
Sport Boys	—	—	—	—	—	—	—	—	—	—	—	—	—	—	—	—
Sport Huancayo	—	—	—	—	—	—	0–2	—	—	—	—	—	—	—	—	—
Sport Rosario	—	—	—	—	—	—	2–1	—	—	—	—	—	—	—	—	—
Sporting Cristal	—	—	—	—	—	—	2–0	—	—	—	—	—	—	—	—	—
Unión Comercio	—	—	—	—	—	—	0–0	—	—	—	—	—	—	—	—	—
Universidad San Martín	—	—	—	—	—	—	—	—	—	—	—	—	—	—	—	—
Universitario	—	—	—	—	—	—	1–1	—	—	—	—	—	—	—	—	—
UTC	—	—	—	—	—	—	—	—	—	—	—	—	—	—	—	—

Source: ADFP, Soccerway
Legend: Blue = home team win; Yellow = draw; Red = away team win.

== Torneo Clausura ==
Pos	Team	Pld	W	D	L	GF	GA	GD	Pts	Qualification
1	Melgar	15	9	3	3	21	13	+8	30	Advance to Playoffs and qualification to Copa Libertadores
2	Alianza Lima	15	8	3	4	20	14	+6	27	
3	Ayacucho	15	7	5	3	30	25	+5	26	

=== Results ===
Home \ Away	ALI	AYA	BIN	CAN	COM	MUN	MEL	RGA	SBA	SHU	SRO	CRI	UCO	USM	UNI	UTC
Alianza Lima	—	—	—	—	—	—	0–1	—	—	—	—	—	—	—	—	—
Ayacucho	—	—	—	—	—	—	0–0	—	—	—	—	—	—	—	—	—
Binacional	—	—	—	—	—	—	0–4	—	—	—	—	—	—	—	—	—
Cantolao	—	—	—	—	—	—	—	—	—	—	—	—	—	—	—	—
Comerciantes Unidos	—	—	—	—	—	—	—	—	—	—	—	—	—	—	—	—
Deportivo Municipal	—	—	—	—	—	—	—	—	—	—	—	—	—	—	—	—
Melgar	—	—	—	0–1	2–1	1–0	—	—	—	3–2	2–1	2–0	1–0	—	2–1	—
Real Garcilaso	—	—	—	—	—	—	2–2	—	—	—	—	—	—	—	—	—
Sport Boys	—	—	—	—	—	—	1–0	—	—	—	—	—	—	—	—	—
Sport Huancayo	—	—	—	—	—	—	—	—	—	—	—	—	—	—	—	—
Sport Rosario	—	—	—	—	—	—	—	—	—	—	—	—	—	—	—	—
Sporting Cristal	—	—	—	—	—	—	—	—	—	—	—	—	—	—	—	—
Unión Comercio	—	—	—	—	—	—	—	—	—	—	—	—	—	—	—	—
Universidad San Martín	—	—	—	—	—	—	1–1	—	—	—	—	—	—	—	—	—
Universitario	—	—	—	—	—	—	—	—	—	—	—	—	—	—	—	—
UTC	—	—	—	—	—	—	3–0	—	—	—	—	—	—	—	—	—

Source: ADFP, Soccerway
Legend: Blue = home team win; Yellow = draw; Red = away team win.

== Play-offs ==
=== Semi-final ===
Tied 2–2 in points, Alianza Lima won on penalties and qualified for the Finals.

December 2, 2018 First Leg	Alianza Lima	3–3	Melgar	Estadio Alejandro Villanueva, Lima
16:00	Affonso 68'; Quevedo 69'; Fuentes 77'	Report	Sánchez 24'; Gonzáles 31'; Loyola 64'	Attendance: 28,905; Referee: Kevin Ortega

December 6, 2018 Second Leg	Melgar	2–2 (0–2 p)	Alianza Lima	Estadio Monumental Virgen de Chapi, Arequipa
20:00	Cuesta 33'; Carmona 61'	Report	Posito 17', 79'	Attendance: 30,177; Referee: Joel Alarcón
	Penalties
	Etchemaite (penalty missed); Biancucchi (penalty missed); Miguez (penalty missed); Arce (penalty missed)		(penalty scored) Ramírez; (penalty missed) Hohberg; (penalty scored) Posito

== Second stage ==
Santiago Wanderers won 2–1 on aggregate and advanced to the third stage.

30 January 2018	Santiago Wanderers (Chile)	1–1	(Peru) Melgar	Estadio Elías Figueroa Brander, Valparaíso
21:30 UTC−3	Viotti 1'	Report	Cuesta 45+2'	Attendance: 7,435; Referee: Alexis Herrera (Venezuela)

6 February 2018	Melgar (Peru)	0–1	(Chile) Santiago Wanderers	Estadio Monumental de la UNSA, Arequipa
19:30 UTC−5		Report	Medel 44'	Attendance: 7,500; Referee: Ricardo Marques (Brazil)

== See also ==
- FBC Melgar
- 2018 Torneo Descentralizado
- 2018 Torneo de Promoción y Reservas
