= 2018 Torneo Descentralizado =

Torneo Descentralizado
- Season: 2018
- Dates: 3 February – 16 December 2018
- Champions: Sporting Cristal (19th title)
- Relegated: Sport Rosario; Comerciantes Unidos
- Copa Libertadores: Sporting Cristal; Alianza Lima; Melgar; Real Garcilaso
- Copa Sudamericana: Deportivo Municipal; Sport Huancayo; UTC; Binacional
- Matches: 357
- Goals: 978 (2.74 per match)
- Top goalscorer: Emanuel Herrera (40 goals)
- Biggest home win: Sporting Cristal 6–0 Ayacucho (4 November)
- Biggest away win: Sport Rosario 0–8 Sporting Cristal (23 November)
- Highest scoring: Ayacucho 5–3 Sporting Cristal (1 March); Sport Rosario 0–8 Sporting Cristal (23 November)
- Highest attendance: 34,940; Universitario 2–1 Sporting Cristal (30 October)
- Total attendance: 1,318,107
- Average attendance: 3,692

The 2018 Torneo Descentralizado de Fútbol Profesional (known as the 2018 Copa Movistar for sponsorship reasons) was the 102nd edition of the top flight of Association football governed by the Federación Peruana de Futbol (FPF) (Spanish: Federación Peruana de Futbol or FPF). There were 16 teams in play; Alianza Lima were the defending champions. Sporting Cristal won their nineteenth domestic championship on 16 December after beating Alianza Lima in both legs of the finals.

== Competition format ==
The season was played in four phases: Torneo de Verano (Summer Tournament), Torneo Apertura (Opening Tournament), Torneo Clausura (Closing Tournament), and the Playoffs.

In the Torneo de Verano, teams were separated into two groups. Teams in each group played two matches against each team in their group, once at home and once away. The winner of each group qualified to play a double-legged final. The group winner with the most points on the aggregate table chose their home match. The winner of this tournament gained access to the playoffs and the 2019 Copa Libertadores if they finished in the top eight of the aggregate table at the end of the season.

The Torneo Apertura and Torneo Clausura were two smaller tournament of 15 games in which each team played all others once. In the Torneo Clausura, matches were played in reverse order to the ones in the Torneo Apertura, and Apertura points did not carry over to Clausura. The winners of the Apertura and Clausura qualified to the playoffs and the 2019 Copa Libertadores as long as they finished in the top eight of the aggregate table at the end of the season.

In the Playoffs, the winners of the three tournaments and the top team in the aggregate table played two semifinals with the winners playing the final. If a team won two out of the three tournaments, they would qualify for the final and the winner of the remaining tournament would play in the semifinal the best team in the aggregate table. The team with the most points on the aggregate table chose the home match. If teams were tied in points, a third match on neutral ground would be played to decide the national champion. If a team won the three tournaments, the playoffs would have been canceled and they would be declared as champions. The 2019 Copa Sudamericana berths were awarded to the four teams with the best record in the aggregate table that did not qualify for the Copa Libertadores. The two teams with the fewest points at the end of the third leg were relegated.

== Teams ==
There were 16 teams confirmed to play in the 2018 Torneo Descentralizado; 14 teams from the previous season, the 2017 Segunda División champion (Sport Boys), and the 2017 Copa Perú champion (Binacional).

=== Team changes ===
Promoted from 2017 Segunda División	Promoted from 2017 Copa Perú	Relegated from 2017 Primera División
▲ Sport Boys (1st)	▲ Binacional (1st)	▼ Juan Aurich (15th) ▼ Alianza Atlético (16th)

=== Stadia and locations ===
Locations of the 2018 Primera División teams

Team	City	Stadium	Capacity
Academia Cantolao	Callao	Miguel Grau	15,000
Alianza Lima	Lima	Alejandro Villanueva	35,000
Ayacucho	Ayacucho	Ciudad de Cumaná^{a}	15,000
Binacional	Arequipa	25 de Noviembre^{b}	21,000
Comerciantes Unidos	Cutervo	Carlos A. Olivares^{c}	12,000
Deportivo Municipal	Lima	Miguel Grau^{d}	17,000
Melgar	Arequipa	Virgen de Chapi	60,000
Real Garcilaso	Cusco	Estadio Garcilaso	42,056
Sport Boys	Callao	Miguel Grau	17,000
Sport Huancayo	Huancayo	Estadio Huancayo	20,000
Sport Rosario	Huaraz	Rosas Pampa	18,000
Sporting Cristal	Lima	Alberto Gallardo	18,000
Unión Comercio	Nueva Cajamarca	IPD de Nueva Cajamarca	12,000
Universidad San Martín	Lima	Alberto Gallardo	18,000
UTC	Cajamarca	Germán Contreras^{e}	6,300
Universitario	Lima	Monumental	80,093

a: Ayacucho played their home games in the Torneo de Verano and Torneo Apertura at Estadio Eloy Molina Robles in Huanta while their regular stadium Estadio Ciudad de Cumaná underwent maintenance works. However, they temporarily moved their home games to Estadio Huancayo in Huancayo since Estadio Eloy Molina Robles in Huanta was deemed unfit for use by the ADFP.
b: Binacional played their home games in the Torneo de Verano at Estadio Monumental Virgen de Chapi in Arequipa, moving to Estadio 25 de Noviembre in Moquegua for the start of the Torneo Apertura due to poor attendances in their home games.
c: Comerciantes Unidos played their home games at Estadio Carlos A. Olivares in Guadalupe due to their regular stadium Estadio Juan Maldonado Gamarra not meeting ADFP's stadium requirements. Comerciantes Unidos played their home games in the Torneo Clausura at Estadio Mansiche in Trujillo and Estadio Cristo El Señor in Baños del Inca after they were barred from using the Estadio Carlos A. Olivares for the remainder of the season due to the incidents in their home match against Ayacucho.
d: Deportivo Municipal played their home games at Estadio Nacional in Lima and Estadio Miguel Grau in Callao due to their regular stadium Estadio Iván Elías Moreno not meeting ADFP's stadium requirements.
e: UTC initially planned to play their home games at Estadio Mansiche in Trujillo due to their regular stadium Estadio Héroes de San Ramón not meeting ADFP's stadium requirements. However, and given that Estadio Mansiche was also unable to meet ADFP's stadium requirements, UTC decided to move their home games to Estadio Carlos A. Olivares in Guadalupe and later to Estadio Germán Contreras in Cajabamba.

== Torneo de Verano ==
=== Group A ===
Pos	Team	Pld	W	D	L	GF	GA	GD	Pts	Qualification	CRI	SRO	UTC	USM	ALI	COM	AYA	UNI
1	Sporting Cristal	14	10	3	1	42	15	+27	33	Advance to Finals		4–1	2–2	4–1	3–0	3–0	5–0	1–1
2	Sport Rosario	14	6	2	6	23	21	+2	20		0–1		4–0	1–0	1–1	3–0	5–1	1–1
3	UTC	14	5	5	4	14	19	−5	20		0–3 (Note: Match awarded 3–0 to Sporting Cristal due to UTC failing to provide a suitable stadium for the match.)	1–0		0–0	1–0	1–3	2–1	0–0
4	Universidad San Martín	14	4	7	3	20	18	+2	19		1–5	4–0	2–2		1–0	1–1	4–0	1–1
5	Alianza Lima	14	5	4	5	16	17	−1	19		0–2	3–1	1–1	0–0		1–1	3–1	2–0
6	Comerciantes Unidos	14	4	2	8	18	26	−8	14		1–3	2–4	1–2	1–2	3–0		2–1	0–2
7	Ayacucho	14	4	2	8	22	34	−12	14		5–3	2–0	2–1	1–1	1–2	2–3		4–2
8	Universitario	14	2	7	5	16	21	−5	13		3–3	1–2	0–1	2–2	1–3	1–0	1–1	

Source: ADFP, Soccerway
Legend: Blue = home team win; Yellow = draw; Red = away team win.
Rules for classification: 1) Points; 2) Goal difference; 3) Goals for; 4) Drawing of lots.

=== Group B ===
Pos	Team	Pld	W	D	L	GF	GA	GD	Pts	Qualification	SHU	MEL	BIN	MUN	RGA	CAN	SBA	UCO
1	Sport Huancayo	14	8	3	3	29	20	+9	27	Advance to Finals		1–1	2–2	2–1	3–1	2–1	2–0	3–2
2	Melgar	14	6	7	1	20	13	+7	25		2–1		1–1	2–0	1–2	0–0	2–1	2–1
3	Binacional	14	5	6	3	18	17	+1	21		2–2	2–2		0–0	3–1	0–2	2–1	3–0
4	Deportivo Municipal	14	6	2	6	24	21	+3	20		2–3	1–3	4–0		3–0	3–0	3–2	2–1
5	Real Garcilaso	14	6	2	6	21	23	−2	20		0–3	0–0	1–0	5–1		1–0	2–0	5–2
6	Academia Cantolao	14	4	5	5	14	13	+1	17		3–0	1–2	0–0	1–1	2–0		2–2	1–0
7	Sport Boys	14	3	4	7	15	21	−6	13		2–1	1–1	0–1	0–2	3–1	1–1		1–0
8	Unión Comercio	14	2	3	9	15	28	−13	9		1–4	1–1	1–2	2–1	2–2	1–0	1–1	

Source: ADFP, Soccerway
Legend: Blue = home team win; Yellow = draw; Red = away team win.
Rules for classification: 1) Points; 2) Goal difference; 3) Goals for; 4) Drawing of lots.

=== Finals ===
The champion was the team with the most points after the two legs were played. In case both teams tied in points and scored the same number of goals, there would have been 30 minutes of extra time and penalties if still tied.

Times are local, PET (UTC−5).

6 May 2018
15:30
First leg

Sport Huancayo	1–1	Sporting Cristal
Neumann 65' (pen.)	Report	Costa 37'

Estadio Huancayo, Huancayo
Attendance: 8,352
Referee: Michael Espinoza

12 May 2018
20:15
Second leg

Sporting Cristal	1–0	Sport Huancayo
Revoredo 59'	Report

Estadio Nacional, Lima
Attendance: 19,936
Referee: Diego Haro

Sporting Cristal won 2–1 on aggregate and secured a spot in the Playoffs.

== Torneo Apertura ==
=== Standings ===
Pos	Team	Pld	W	D	L	GF	GA	GD	Pts	Qualification
1	Sporting Cristal	15	9	5	1	27	7	+20	32	Advance to Playoffs and qualification to Copa Libertadores
2	Alianza Lima	15	8	3	4	24	16	+8	27	
3	Real Garcilaso	15	8	2	5	19	19	0	26	
4	Deportivo Municipal	15	7	3	5	21	16	+5	24	
5	UTC	15	6	6	3	19	15	+4	24	
6	Melgar	15	6	6	3	23	20	+3	24	
7	Unión Comercio	15	6	5	4	17	16	+1	23	
8	Binacional	15	6	3	6	15	14	+1	21	
9	Sport Boys	15	4	7	4	20	21	−1	19	
10	Sport Huancayo	15	4	6	5	16	15	+1	18	
11	Universitario	15	4	6	5	18	21	−3	18	
12	Sport Rosario (Note: Sport Rosario were deducted 4 points for an outstanding debt.)	15	6	3	6	21	24	−3	17	
13	Academia Cantolao	15	4	5	6	21	27	−6	17	
14	Universidad San Martín	15	2	7	6	20	23	−3	13	
15	Ayacucho	15	3	3	9	17	21	−4	12	
16	Comerciantes Unidos	15	0	4	11	10	33	−23	4	

Source: ADFP, Soccerway
Rules for classification: 1) Points; 2) Goal difference; 3) Goals for; 4) Drawing of lots; 5) Play-off (only if needed to decide first place).
If two teams are tied in points for first place: 2) Play-off.

=== Results ===
Home \ Away	ALI	AYA	BIN	CAN	COM	MUN	MEL	RGA	SBA	SHU	SRO	CRI	UCO	USM	UNI	UTC
Alianza Lima		1–0	2–1		5–1	3–1			1–0				2–0	3–1		0–1
Ayacucho					3–0 (Note: Match awarded 3–0 to Ayacucho due to Comerciantes Unidos fielding the ineligible player Junior Aguirre. The original result was a 2–1 win for Comerciantes Unidos.)	1–2				3–1	2–0	0–1	1–1	1–1		2–3
Binacional		1–0			1–0	0–0					3–1	1–1	1–1	2–0		1–0
Academia Cantolao	1–1	3–2	3–1				1–1	1–2	2–2					1–1		
Comerciantes Unidos				0–4		1–1	2–2			0–3	0–0	1–1			3–4	
Deportivo Municipal				1–0			4–0	2–0		1–0	4–0	0–1	3–0		0–2	
Melgar	2–0	3–0	2–1					1–0	2–2					3–2		3–3
Real Garcilaso	2–0	2–1	1–0		1–0				3–2					3–3		1–0
Sport Boys		1–0	1–0		2–1	1–1						1–1	2–4	3–2		1–1
Sport Huancayo	1–1		1–2	3–0			0–2	1–1	0–0				0–0		2–1	
Sport Rosario	3–2			4–1			2–1	2–1	1–1	2–4			0–2		3–0	
Sporting Cristal	1–2			4–0			2–0	5–1		0–0	2–1		4–0		1–0	
Unión Comercio				2–0	2–0		0–0	1–0						0–0	2–0	2–3
Universidad San Martín					2–0	6–1				0–0	0–1	0–3			2–2	0–0
Universitario	1–1	1–1	1–0	2–2			1–1	0–1	2–1							
UTC				1–2	2–1	1–0				2–0	1–1	0–0			1–1	

Source: ADFP, Soccerway
Legend: Blue = home team win; Yellow = draw; Red = away team win.

=== Attendances ===
#	Football club	Average attendance
1	Universitario	10,805
2	Alianza Lima	5,872
3	Sporting Cristal	5,766
4	Melgar	4,745
5	Sport Rosario	2,332
6	Sport Boys	2,005
7	Sport Huancayo	1,781
8	Real Garcilaso	1,739
9	Binacional	1,593
10	Deportivo Municipal	1,276
11	UTC	980
12	Universidad San Martín	866
13	Ayacucho	805
14	Academia Cantolao	801
15	Unión Comercio	545
16	Comerciantes Unidos	401

Source: World Football

== Torneo Clausura ==
=== Standings ===
Pos	Team	Pld	W	D	L	GF	GA	GD	Pts	Qualification
1	Melgar	15	9	3	3	21	13	+8	30	Advance to Playoffs and qualification to Copa Libertadores
2	Alianza Lima	15	8	3	4	20	14	+6	27	
3	Ayacucho	15	7	5	3	30	25	+5	26	
4	Universitario	15	8	2	5	20	17	+3	26	
5	Sporting Cristal	15	7	3	5	37	14	+23	24	
6	Unión Comercio	15	7	2	6	29	25	+4	23	
7	Universidad San Martín	15	6	4	5	20	20	0	22	
8	Real Garcilaso	15	5	6	4	26	22	+4	21	
9	Academia Cantolao (Note: Cantolao were deducted 2 points for an outstanding debt.)	15	7	1	7	18	22	−4	20	
10	Deportivo Municipal (Note: Deportivo Municipal were deducted 1 point for an outstanding debt.)	15	6	3	6	15	19	−4	20	
11	Sport Boys	15	5	3	7	21	23	−2	18	
12	Comerciantes Unidos (Note: Comerciantes Unidos were deducted 1 point for an outstanding debt.)	15	5	3	7	15	19	−4	17	
13	Binacional	15	5	2	8	14	25	−11	17	
14	UTC (Note: UTC were deducted 1 point for an outstanding debt.)	15	4	5	6	14	14	0	16	
15	Sport Huancayo	15	3	7	5	19	22	−3	16	
16	Sport Rosario (Note: Sport Rosario were deducted 3 points for an outstanding debt.)	15	1	2	12	10	35	−25	2	

Source: ADFP, Soccerway
Rules for classification: 1) Points; 2) Goal difference; 3) Goals for; 4) Drawing of lots; 5) Play-off (only if needed to decide first place).
If two teams are tied in points for first place: 2) Play-off.

=== Results ===
Home \ Away	ALI	AYA	BIN	CAN	COM	MUN	MEL	RGA	SBA	SHU	SRO	CRI	UCO	USM	UNI	UTC
Alianza Lima				2–0			0–1	1–0		2–1	1–0	2–2			2–1	
Ayacucho	1–2		3–0	3–1			0–0	1–1	3–2						4–2	
Binacional	3–2			2–0			0–4	1–4	2–1	0–0					0–1	
Academia Cantolao					2–0	1–0				1–1	2–0	0–3	2–1		2–0	2–1
Comerciantes Unidos	1–0	0–3 (Note: Match awarded 3–0 to Ayacucho after it was suspended due to an aggression on referee Michael Espinoza at halftime. The score at the moment of the suspension was 0–2.)	1–2					1–0	3–2				2–2	3–1		0–0
Deportivo Municipal	1–0	2–2	1–0		1–0				0–0					3–1		0–1
Melgar				0–1	2–1	1–0				3–2	2–1	2–0	1–0		2–1	
Real Garcilaso				3–1		3–3	2–2			2–2	3–1	2–2	1–0		0–1	
Sport Boys	1–1			3–1			1–0	3–1		2–0	3–1				0–0	
Sport Huancayo		3–3			1–0	2–0					1–1	1–1		2–1		1–1
Sport Rosario		2–3	0–2		1–1	0–1						0–8		0–2		1–0
Sporting Cristal		6–0	4–0		0–2	4–0			4–0					0–1		1–0
Unión Comercio	1–3	3–1	1–1			3–1			4–2	4–2	4–2	2–1				
Universidad San Martín	1–1	1–3	1–0	3–2			1–1	2–3	1–0				2–0			
Universitario					2–0	1–2				1–0	2–0	2–1	2–1	2–2		2–1
UTC	0–1	0–0	2–1				3–0	1–1	2–1				2–3	0–0		

Source: ADFP, Soccerway
Legend: Blue = home team win; Yellow = draw; Red = away team win.

== Aggregate table ==
All stages (Torneo de Verano, Torneo Apertura, and Torneo Clausura) of the 2018 season were aggregated into a single league table throughout the season to determine one of the teams that will qualify for the Copa Libertadores and the four Copa Sudamericana qualifiers, as well as those to be relegated at the end of the season.

Pos	Team	Pld	W	D	L	GF	GA	GD	Pts	Qualification
1	Sporting Cristal (Note: Sporting Cristal were awarded 2 points for winning the 2018 Torneo de Promoción y Reserva.) (C)	44	26	11	7	106	36	+70	91	Qualification to Playoffs and Copa Libertadores group stage
2	Melgar	44	21	16	7	64	46	+18	79	Qualification to Playoffs and Copa Libertadores second stage
3	Alianza Lima (Note: Alianza Lima were awarded 1 point for being 2018 Torneo de Promoción y Reserva runners-up.)	44	21	10	13	60	47	+13	74	Qualification to Playoffs and Copa Libertadores group stage
4	Real Garcilaso	44	19	10	15	66	64	+2	67	Qualification to Copa Libertadores first stage
5	Deportivo Municipal (Note: Deportivo Municipal were deducted 1 point for an outstanding debt.)	44	19	8	17	60	56	+4	64	Qualification to Copa Sudamericana first stage
6	Sport Huancayo	44	15	16	13	64	57	+7	61	Qualification to Copa Sudamericana first stage
7	UTC (Note: UTC were deducted 1 point for an outstanding debt.)	44	15	16	13	47	48	−1	60	Qualification to Copa Sudamericana first stage
8	Binacional	44	16	11	17	47	56	−9	59	Qualification to Copa Sudamericana first stage
9	Universitario	44	14	15	15	54	59	−5	57	
10	Unión Comercio	44	15	10	19	61	69	−8	55	
11	Universidad San Martín	44	12	18	14	60	61	−1	54	
12	Academia Cantolao (Note: Cantolao were deducted 2 points for an outstanding debt.)	44	15	11	18	53	62	−9	54	
13	Ayacucho	44	14	10	20	69	80	−11	52	
14	Sport Boys	44	12	14	18	56	65	−9	50	
15	Sport Rosario (Note: Sport Rosario were deducted 7 points for outstanding debts.) (R)	44	13	7	24	54	80	−26	39	Relegation to 2019 Liga 2
16	Comerciantes Unidos (Note: Comerciantes Unidos were deducted 1 point for an outstanding debt.) (R)	44	9	9	26	43	78	−35	35	Relegation to 2019 Liga 2

Source: ADFP
Rules for classification: 1) Points; 2) Goal difference; 3) Goals for; 4) Drawing of lots; 5) Play-off (only if needed to decide teams for relegation).
If two teams are tied in points for penultimate place: 2) Play-off.
(C) Champions; (R) Relegated

== Playoffs ==
Semifinal				Finals
				Sporting Cristal	4	3	7
				Alianza Lima	1	0	1
Melgar	3	2	5 (0)	Alianza Lima	1	0	1
Alianza Lima (p)	3	2	5 (2)

=== Semi-final ===
==== First leg ====
December 2, 2018
16:00
First Leg

Alianza Lima	3–3	Melgar
Affonso 68'; Quevedo 69'; Fuentes 77'	Report	Sánchez 24'; Gonzáles 31'; Loyola 64'

Estadio Alejandro Villanueva, Lima
Attendance: 28,905
Referee: Kevin Ortega

==== Second leg ====
December 6, 2018
20:00
Second Leg

Melgar	2–2	Alianza Lima
Cuesta 33'; Carmona 61'	Report	Posito 17', 79'
Penalties
Etchemaite (penalty missed); Biancucchi (penalty missed); Miguez (penalty missed); Arce (penalty missed)	0–2	(penalty scored) Ramírez; (penalty missed) Hohberg; (penalty scored) Posito

Estadio Monumental Virgen de Chapi, Arequipa
Attendance: 30,177
Referee: Joel Alarcón

Tied 2–2 in points, Alianza Lima won on penalties and qualified for the Finals.

=== Finals ===
Sporting Cristal (Torneo de Verano and Torneo Apertura winners) and Alianza Lima (winning semi-finalists) contested the finals.

December 12, 2018
20:00
First Leg

Alianza Lima	1–4	Sporting Cristal
Adrianzén 83'	Report	López 5'; Revoredo 16'; Costa 85'; Pacheco 90'

Estadio Alejandro Villanueva, Lima
Attendance: 30,266
Referee: Diego Haro

December 16, 2018
16:00
Second Leg

Sporting Cristal	3–0	Alianza Lima
Cazulo 14'; Costa 27'; Herrera 72'	Report

Estadio Nacional, Lima
Attendance: 34,635
Referee: Víctor Hugo Carrillo

Sporting Cristal won 6–0 in points.

== Top goalscorers ==
Rank	Name	Club	Goals
1	(Argentina) Emanuel Herrera	Sporting Cristal	40
2	(Paraguay) Carlos Neumann	Sport Huancayo	27
3	(Uruguay) Gabriel Costa	Sporting Cristal	26
4	(Peru) Mauricio Montes	Ayacucho	22
5	(Colombia) Fabián González	Academia Cantolao	21
6	(Ivory Coast) Aké Loba	Universidad San Martín	18
7	(Panama) Luis Tejada	Sport Boys	17
8	(Peru) Willyan Mimbela	Unión Comercio	15
9	(Argentina) Tulio Etchemaite	Sport Rosario / Melgar	13
9	(Colombia) Donald Millán	UTC	13

Source: ADFP

== See also ==
- 2018 Supercopa Movistar
- 2018 Torneo de Promoción y Reserva
- 2018 Peruvian Segunda División
- 2018 Copa Perú
- 2018 in Peruvian football
