= 2018 Supercopa Movistar =

Alianza Lima	Sport Boys
1	0
- Date: January 31, 2018
- Venue: Estadio Nacional, Lima
- Referee: Augusto Menéndez

The 2018 Movistar Supercopa was a friendly football tournament organized by the Asociación Deportiva de Fútbol Profesional (ADFP) and sponsored by the telecommunications company Movistar. The tournament was played as a single match in the city of Lima. Its creation responded to a contractual clause between the ADFP and Movistar, which required a specified number of matches to be played on the year.

This was the only edition of the tournament and featured Alianza Lima, champions of the 2017 Torneo Descentralizado, and Sport Boys, champions of the 2017 Peruvian Segunda División.

== Qualified teams ==
Team	Qualification
Alianza Lima	2017 Primera División champion
Sport Boys	2017 Segunda División champion

== Match details ==
31 January 2018
20:00

Alianza Lima	1–0	Sport Boys
Carlos Ascues 65' (pen.)

Estadio Nacional, Lima
Referee: Augusto Menéndez

Alianza Lima	Sport Boys

ALIANZA LIMA:
GK	12	(Peru) Daniel Prieto
DF	30	(Peru) José Marina
DF	2	(Peru) Gianmarco Gambetta
DF	28	(Peru) José Cotrina
DF	3	(Peru) José Guidino	(substituted off) 46'
MF	22	(Peru) Aldair Fuentes (C)	(yellow card) 37' (red card) 83'
MF	6	(Peru) Carlos Ascues
MF	4	(Argentina) Tomás Costa
FW	29	(Peru) Erinson Ramírez	(substituted off) 61'
FW	16	(Peru) Gonzalo Sánchez	(substituted off) 61'
FW	27	(Peru) Kevin Quevedo	(substituted off) 86'
Substitutes:
DF	5	(Peru) Francisco Duclós	(substituted on) 46'
MF	7	(Uruguay) Maximiliano Lemos	(substituted on) 61'
FW	25	(Peru) Kevin Ferreyra	(substituted on) 61'
DF	13	(Peru) Fabio Rojas	(substituted on) 88' (yellow card) 90+2'
Manager:
(Uruguay) Pablo Bengoechea

SPORT BOYS:
GK	21	(Argentina) Daniel Ferreyra (C)
DF	3	(Peru) Manuel Tejada	(yellow card) 63'
DF	4	(Mexico) Carlos Ambriz
DF	22	(Peru) Manuel Contreras
DF	24	(Peru) Carlos Neyra	(yellow card) 80'
MF	7	(Peru) Crifford Seminario	(substituted off) 46'
MF	14	(Peru) Carlos Diez
MF	11	(Peru) Juan Diego Gutiérrez	(substituted off) 54'
MF	8	(Peru) Renzo Sheput	(substituted off) 66'
MF	30	(Peru) Guillermo Tomasevich	(substituted off) 66'
FW	27	(Argentina) Maximiliano Velasco	(substituted off) 66'
Substitutes:
	17	(Peru) Alexander Llanos	(substituted on) 46'
	19	(Peru) Joazhiño Arroé	(substituted on) 54'
	10	(Peru) Mario Tajima	(substituted on) 66'
	5	(Argentina) Emiliano Ciucci	(substituted on) 66'
	9	(Panama) Luis Tejada	(substituted on) 66'
Manager:
(Uruguay) Mario Viera
