= 2018 Sporting Cristal season =

Football league season

Sporting Cristal
2018 season
- President: Federico Cúneo
- Stadium: Alberto Gallardo, Lima
- Torneo Descentralizado: Torneo Apertura: First (1°) Champions; Torneo Clausura: Fifth (5°); Aggregate Table: First (1°) Champions; Final National: Champions; Champions National (1°)
- Torneo de Verano: First (1°) (Group A); Final ( Champions)
- Copa Sudamericana: First stage
Home colours	Away colours	Third colours

The 2018 Sporting Cristal season were the Sixty-Third (63.º) of the club from its foundation in 1955, Sixty-Three (63) participations consecutives in the top-flight of Peruvian Primera División (of 102 Editions) with denomination last Torneo Descentralizado. In Previous Season the club qualified as 8th Place of the 2017 Torneo Descentralizado.

Sporting Cristal were a of sixteen (16) clubs in the Fifty-Third edition (53.º) Torneo Descentralizado, the competition most important of the Peruvian football. The club played the Peruvian Primera División and Copa Sudamericana for First (1st) Time. Sporting Cristal won their 19th Torneo Descentralizado Title.

== Torneo Descentralizado ==
=== Torneo Apertura ===
Pos	Team	Pld	W	D	L	GF	GA	GD	Pts
1	Sporting Cristal	15	9	5	1	27	7	+20	32
2	Alianza Lima	15	8	3	4	24	16	+8	27
3	Real Garcilaso	15	8	2	5	19	19	0	26

== See also ==
- Club Sporting Cristal
- 2018 Torneo Descentralizado
