= Gambetta =

Gambetta may refer to:

- Gambetta (surname)
- Gambetta station, a Paris Metro station
- Gambetta tram stop, in Bordeaux
- French armoured cruiser Léon Gambetta, ship of the French Navy, 1901–1915
- Léon Gambetta class cruiser, class of ships of the French Navy
