= Gambetta (surname) =

Gambetta is a surname. Notable people with the surname include:

- Beppe Gambetta (b. 1955), Italian musician
- Diego Gambetta (b. 1952), Italian sociologist
- Gianmarco Gambetta (b. 1991), Peruvian footballer
- Léon Gambetta (1838–1882), French statesman
- Schubert Gambetta (1920–1991), Uruguayan footballer
- Jay Gambetta (b. 1979), American Physicist
