= 2019 Copa Libertadores =

60th season of Copa Libertadores

Copa CONMEBOL Libertadores 2019
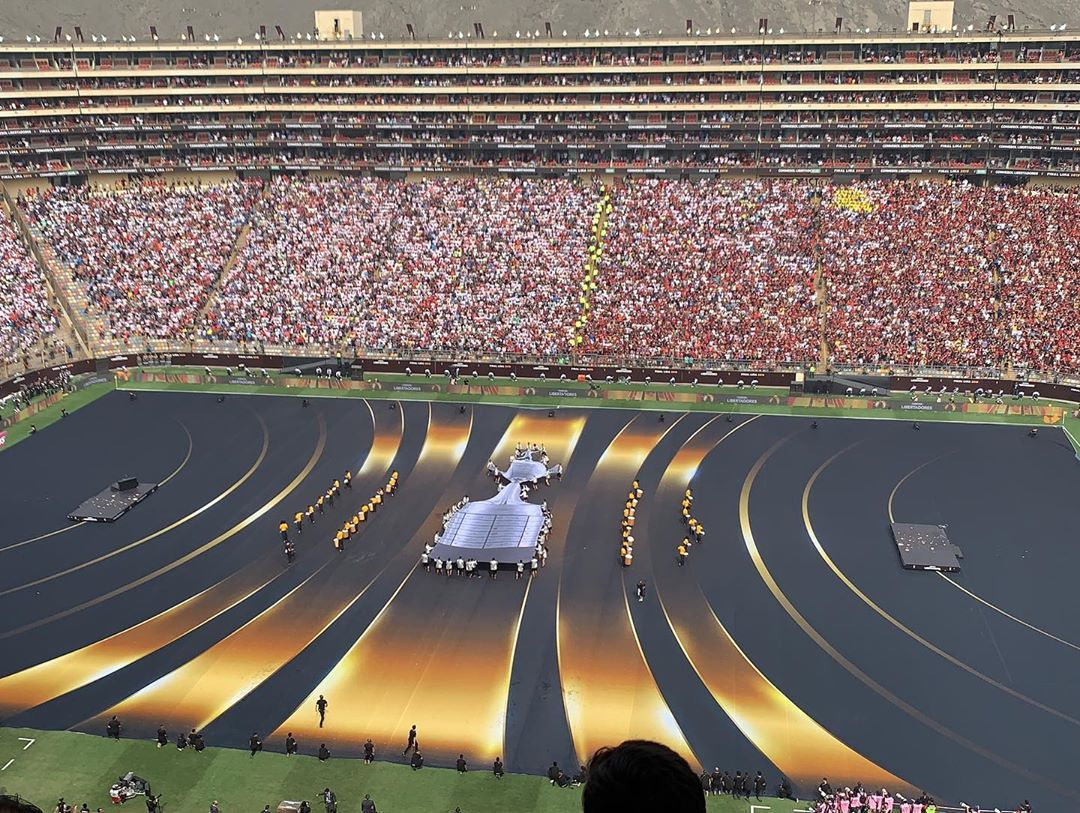
- The Estadio Monumental in Lima hosted the final

Tournament details
- Dates: 22 January – 23 November 2019
- Teams: 47 (from 10 associations)

Final positions
- Champions: (Brazil) Flamengo (2nd title)
- Runners-up: (Argentina) River Plate

Tournament statistics
- Matches played: 155
- Goals scored: 365 (2.35 per match)
- Top scorer(s): (Brazil) Gabriel Barbosa (9 goals)
- Best player: (Brazil) Bruno Henrique

The 2019 Copa CONMEBOL Libertadores was the 60th edition of the CONMEBOL Libertadores (also referred to as the Copa Libertadores), South America's premier club football tournament organized by CONMEBOL.

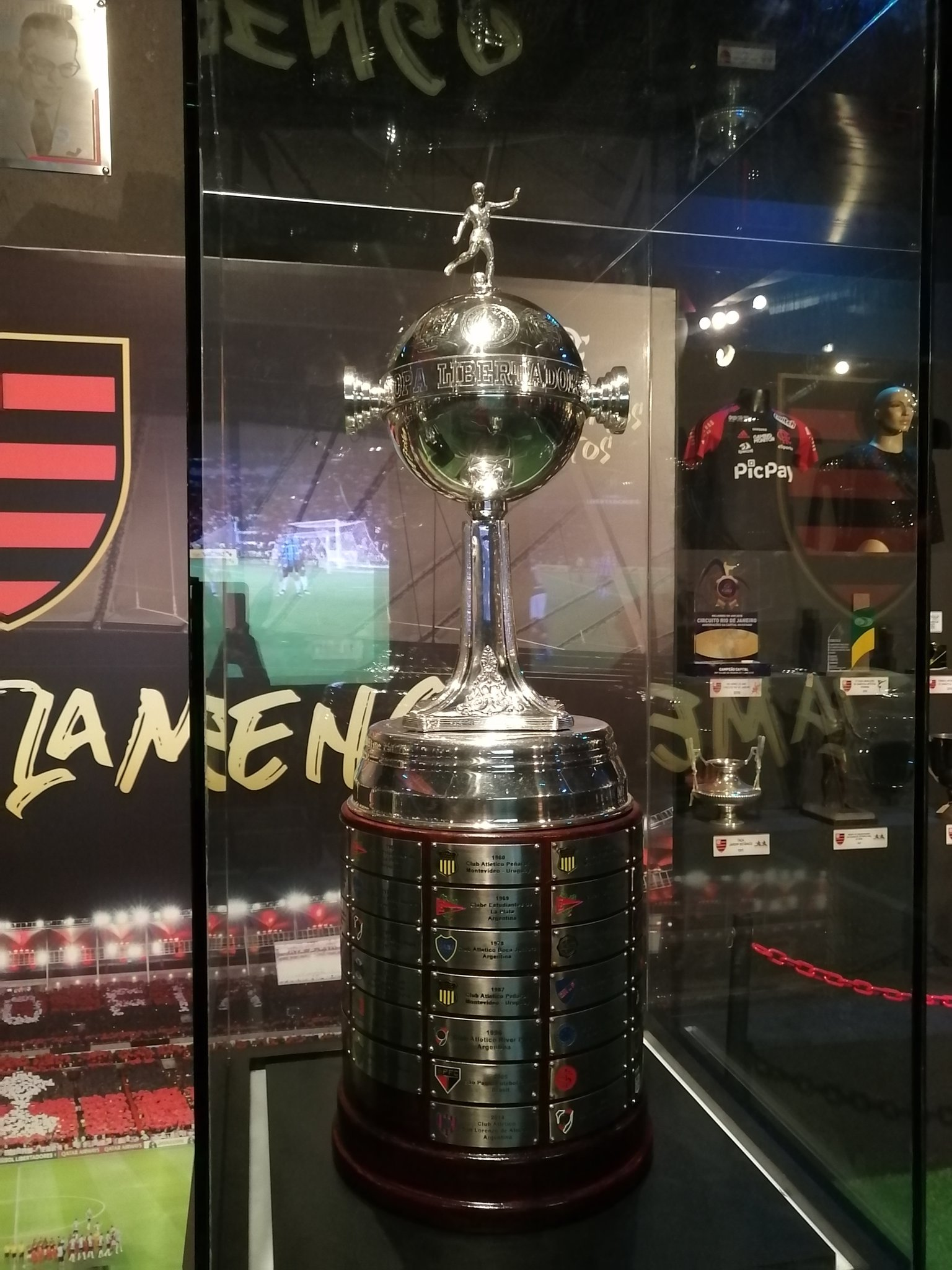
The 2019 Copa Libertadores trophy awarded to Flamengo exhibited at the club's museum.

Flamengo defeated defending champions River Plate in the final by a 2–1 score to win their second Copa Libertadores title. As champions, they qualified as the CONMEBOL representative at the 2019 FIFA Club World Cup in Qatar, and earned the right to play against the winners of the 2019 Copa Sudamericana in the 2020 Recopa Sudamericana. They also automatically qualified for the 2020 Copa Libertadores group stage.

In 2016, CONMEBOL proposed that the Copa Libertadores final to be played as a single match instead of over two legs. It was only on 23 February 2018 that CONMEBOL was able to confirm that starting from this edition, the final will be played as a single match at a venue chosen in advance, and on 11 June 2018 after its Council meeting in Moscow, the confederation confirmed that the final would be played on 23 November 2019. On 14 August 2018, CONMEBOL announced that the 2019 final would be played in Santiago, Chile at the Estadio Nacional Julio Martínez Prádanos, however, due to safety concerns derived from the 2019 Chilean protests, and after consultations with the finalist clubs and their respective football associations, CONMEBOL announced on 5 November 2019 that the match was moved to the Estadio Monumental in Lima, Peru.

== Teams ==
The following 47 teams from the 10 CONMEBOL member associations qualified for the tournament:

- Copa Libertadores champions
- Copa Sudamericana champions
- Brazil: 7 berths
- Argentina: 6 berths
- All other associations: 4 berths each

The entry stage was determined as follows:

- Group stage: 28 teams
  - Copa Libertadores champions
  - Copa Sudamericana champions
  - Teams which qualified for berths 1–5 from Argentina and Brazil
  - Teams which qualified for berths 1–2 from all other associations
- Second stage: 13 teams
  - Teams which qualified for berths 6–7 from Brazil
  - Team which qualified for berth 6 from Argentina
  - Teams which qualified for berths 3–4 from Chile and Colombia
  - Teams which qualified for berth 3 from all other associations
- First stage: 6 teams
  - Teams which qualified for berth 4 from Bolivia, Ecuador, Paraguay, Peru, Uruguay and Venezuela

Association	Team (Berth)	Entry stage	Qualification method
Argentina (6 + 1 berths)	River Plate (Argentina 1; Title holders)	Group stage	2018 Copa Libertadores champions
Argentina (6 + 1 berths)	Boca Juniors (Argentina 2)	Group stage	2017–18 Superliga Argentina champions
Argentina (6 + 1 berths)	Godoy Cruz (Argentina 3)	Group stage	2017–18 Superliga Argentina runners-up
Argentina (6 + 1 berths)	Rosario Central (Argentina 4)	Group stage	2017–18 Copa Argentina champions
Argentina (6 + 1 berths)	San Lorenzo (Argentina 5)	Group stage	2017–18 Superliga Argentina 3rd place
Argentina (6 + 1 berths)	Huracán (Argentina 6)	Group stage	2017–18 Superliga Argentina 4th place
Argentina (6 + 1 berths)	Talleres (Argentina 7)	Second stage	2017–18 Superliga Argentina 5th place
Bolivia (4 berths)	Jorge Wilstermann (Bolivia 1)	Group stage	2018 Apertura champions
Bolivia (4 berths)	San José (Bolivia 2)	Group stage	2018 Clausura champions
Bolivia (4 berths)	The Strongest (Bolivia 3)	Second stage	2018 Clausura runners-up
Bolivia (4 berths)	Bolívar (Bolivia 4)	First stage	2018 Primera División aggregate table best team not yet qualified
Brazil (7 + 1 berths)	Athletico Paranaense (Brazil 1; Copa Sudamericana)	Group stage	2018 Copa Sudamericana champions
Brazil (7 + 1 berths)	Palmeiras (Brazil 2)	Group stage	2018 Campeonato Brasileiro Série A champions
Brazil (7 + 1 berths)	Cruzeiro (Brazil 3)	Group stage	2018 Copa do Brasil champions
Brazil (7 + 1 berths)	Flamengo (Brazil 4)	Group stage	2018 Campeonato Brasileiro Série A runners-up
Brazil (7 + 1 berths)	Internacional (Brazil 5)	Group stage	2018 Campeonato Brasileiro Série A 3rd place
Brazil (7 + 1 berths)	Grêmio (Brazil 6)	Group stage	2018 Campeonato Brasileiro Série A 4th place
Brazil (7 + 1 berths)	São Paulo (Brazil 7)	Second stage	2018 Campeonato Brasileiro Série A 5th place
Brazil (7 + 1 berths)	Atlético Mineiro (Brazil 8)	Second stage	2018 Campeonato Brasileiro Série A 6th place
Chile (4 berths)	Universidad Católica (Chile 1)	Group stage	2018 Primera División champions
Chile (4 berths)	Universidad de Concepción (Chile 2)	Group stage	2018 Primera División runners-up
Chile (4 berths)	Universidad de Chile (Chile 3)	Second stage	2018 Primera División 3rd place
Chile (4 berths)	Palestino (Chile 4)	Second stage	2018 Copa Chile champions
Colombia (4 berths)	Deportes Tolima (Colombia 1)	Group stage	2018 Apertura champions
Colombia (4 berths)	Junior (Colombia 2)	Group stage	2018 Finalización champions
Colombia (4 berths)	Independiente Medellín (Colombia 3)	Second stage	2018 Primera A aggregate table best team not yet qualified
Colombia (4 berths)	Atlético Nacional (Colombia 4)	Second stage	2018 Copa Colombia champions
Ecuador (4 berths)	LDU Quito (Ecuador 1)	Group stage	2018 Serie A champions
Ecuador (4 berths)	Emelec (Ecuador 2)	Group stage	2018 Serie A runners-up
Ecuador (4 berths)	Barcelona (Ecuador 3)	Second stage	2018 Serie A aggregate table best team not yet qualified
Ecuador (4 berths)	Delfín (Ecuador 4)	First stage	2018 Serie A aggregate table 2nd best team not yet qualified
Paraguay (4 berths)	Olimpia (Paraguay 1)	Group stage	2018 Apertura and 2018 Clausura champions
Paraguay (4 berths)	Cerro Porteño (Paraguay 2)	Group stage	2018 Primera División aggregate table best team not yet qualified
Paraguay (4 berths)	Libertad (Paraguay 3)	Second stage	2018 Primera División aggregate table 2nd best team not yet qualified
Paraguay (4 berths)	Nacional (Paraguay 4)	First stage	2018 Primera División aggregate table 3rd best team not yet qualified
Peru (4 berths)	Sporting Cristal (Peru 1)	Group stage	2018 Torneo Descentralizado champions
Peru (4 berths)	Alianza Lima (Peru 2)	Group stage	2018 Torneo Descentralizado runners-up
Peru (4 berths)	Melgar (Peru 3)	Second stage	2018 Torneo Descentralizado 3rd place
Peru (4 berths)	Real Garcilaso (Peru 4)	First stage	2018 Torneo Descentralizado aggregate table best team not yet qualified
Uruguay (4 berths)	Peñarol (Uruguay 1)	Group stage	2018 Primera División champions
Uruguay (4 berths)	Nacional (Uruguay 2)	Group stage	2018 Primera División runners-up
Uruguay (4 berths)	Danubio (Uruguay 3)	Second stage	2018 Primera División aggregate table best team not yet qualified
Uruguay (4 berths)	Defensor Sporting (Uruguay 4)	First stage	2018 Primera División aggregate table 2nd best team not yet qualified
Venezuela (4 berths)	Zamora (Venezuela 1)	Group stage	2018 Primera División champions
Venezuela (4 berths)	Deportivo Lara (Venezuela 2)	Group stage	2018 Primera División runners-up
Venezuela (4 berths)	Caracas (Venezuela 3)	Second stage	2018 Primera División aggregate table best team not yet qualified
Venezuela (4 berths)	Deportivo La Guaira (Venezuela 4)	First stage	2018 Primera División aggregate table 2nd best team not yet qualified

== Schedule ==
The schedule of the competition was as follows. After changing the dates of the 2019 Copa América, the Brazilian Football Confederation released on 3 October 2018 its calendar for the following year, with new dates for the Copa Libertadores. The first stage matches were played on Tuesday, Wednesday, and Thursday instead of Monday and Friday in the last two seasons. The group stage matches were played in six matchdays instead of being spread over a longer period.

Stage	Draw date	First leg	Second leg
First stage	17 December 2018 (Luque, Paraguay)	22–24 January 2019	29–31 January 2019
Second stage	17 December 2018 (Luque, Paraguay)	5–7 February 2019	12–14 February 2019
Third stage	17 December 2018 (Luque, Paraguay)	19–21 February 2019	26–28 February 2019
Group stage	17 December 2018 (Luque, Paraguay)	Matchday 1: 5–7 March 2019; Matchday 2: 12–14 March 2019; Matchday 3: 2–4 April 2019; Matchday 4: 9–11 April 2019; Matchday 5: 23–25 April 2019; Matchday 6: 7–9 May 2019	
Round of 16	13 May 2019 (Luque, Paraguay)	23–25 July 2019	30 July – 1 August 2019
Quarter-finals	13 May 2019 (Luque, Paraguay)	20–22 August 2019	27–29 August 2019
Semi-finals	13 May 2019 (Luque, Paraguay)	1–2 October 2019	22–23 October 2019
Final	13 May 2019 (Luque, Paraguay)	23 November 2019 at Estadio Monumental, Lima	

== Draws ==
Location of teams of the 2019 Copa Libertadores.
- Brown: Group A
- Red: Group B
- Orange: Group C
- Yellow: Group D
- Green: Group E
- Blue: Group F
- Purple: Group G
- Pink: Group H
- White: Play-off rounds.

The draw for the qualifying stages and group stage was held on 17 December 2018, 20:30 PYST (UTC−3), at the CONMEBOL Convention Centre in Luque, Paraguay.

Teams were seeded by their CONMEBOL ranking of the Copa Libertadores as of 15 December 2018 (shown in parentheses), taking into account the following three factors:

1. Performance in the last 10 years, taking into account Copa Libertadores results in the period 2009–2018
2. Historical coefficient, taking into account Copa Libertadores results in the period 1960–2008
3. Local tournament champion, with bonus points awarded to domestic league champions of the last 10 years

For the first stage, the six teams were drawn into three ties (E1–E3), with the teams from Pot 1 hosting the second leg.

First stage draw
Pot 1	Pot 2
(Uruguay) Defensor Sporting (35); (Paraguay) Nacional (37); (Peru) Real Garcilaso (57)	(Ecuador) Delfín (87); (Venezuela) Deportivo La Guaira (209); (Bolivia) Bolívar (21)

Notes

1. ^{BOL} The identity of the team Bolivia 4 was not known at the time of the draw, and was seeded in Pot 2.

For the second stage, the 16 teams were drawn into eight ties (C1–C8), with the teams from Pot 1 hosting the second leg. Teams from the same association could not be drawn into the same tie, excluding the three winners of the first stage, which were allocated to Pot 2 and whose identity was not known at the time of the draw, and could be drawn into the same tie with another team from the same association.

Second stage draw
Pot 1	Pot 2
(Colombia) Atlético Nacional (4); (Brazil) Atlético Mineiro (10); (Brazil) São Paulo (13); (Paraguay) Libertad (23); (Ecuador) Barcelona (24); Universidad de Chile (29); (Colombia) Independiente Medellín (64); (Venezuela) Caracas (67)	(Peru) Melgar (80); (Chile) Palestino (84); (Uruguay) Danubio (85); (Argentina) Talleres (182); (Bolivia) The Strongest (27); First stage winner E1; First stage winner E2; First stage winner E3

Notes

1. ^{BOL} The identity of the team Bolivia 3 was not known at the time of the draw, and was seeded in Pot 2.

For the third stage, the eight winners of the second stage were allocated without any draw into the following four ties (G1–G4), with the team in each tie with the higher CONMEBOL ranking hosting the second leg. As their identity was not known at the time of the draw, they could be drawn into the same tie with another team from the same association.

- Second stage winner C1 vs. Second stage winner C8
- Second stage winner C2 vs. Second stage winner C7
- Second stage winner C3 vs. Second stage winner C6
- Second stage winner C4 vs. Second stage winner C5

For the group stage, the 32 teams were drawn into eight groups (Groups A–H) of four containing a team from each of the four pots. Teams from the same association could not be drawn into the same group, excluding the four winners of the third stage, which were allocated to Pot 4 and whose identity was not known at the time of the draw, and could be drawn into the same group with another team from the same association.

Group stage draw
Pot 1	Pot 2	Pot 3	Pot 4
(Argentina) River Plate (1); (Argentina) Boca Juniors (2); (Brazil) Grêmio (3); (Uruguay) Nacional (5); (Uruguay) Peñarol (6); (Brazil) Palmeiras (7); (Brazil) Cruzeiro (9); (Paraguay) Olimpia (12)	(Brazil) Athletico Paranaense (53); (Argentina) San Lorenzo (14); (Paraguay) Cerro Porteño (15); (Ecuador) Emelec (16); (Brazil) Internacional (25); (Brazil) Flamengo (30); (Chile) Universidad Católica (33); (Peru) Sporting Cristal (34)	(Bolivia) Jorge Wilstermann (41); (Argentina) Rosario Central (43); (Ecuador) LDU Quito (46); (Colombia) Junior (51); (Peru) Alianza Lima (55); (Argentina) Huracán (59); (Argentina) Godoy Cruz (60); (Venezuela) Zamora (69)	(Venezuela) Deportivo Lara (72); (Colombia) Deportes Tolima (76); (Chile) Universidad de Concepción (152); (Bolivia) San José (83); Third stage winner G1; Third stage winner G2; Third stage winner G3; Third stage winner G4

Notes

1. ^{TH} The defending Copa Libertadores champions were automatically seeded in Pot 1 and allocated to Group A.
2. ^{CS} The defending Copa Sudamericana champions were automatically seeded in Pot 2.
3. ^{†} The identity of the team Bolivia 2 was not known at the time of the draw, and was seeded in Pot 4.

The draw for the round of 16 was held on 13 May 2019, 20:30 PYT (UTC−4), at the CONMEBOL Convention Centre in Luque, Paraguay. For the round of 16, the 16 teams were drawn into eight ties (A–H) between a group winner (Pot 1) and a group runner-up (Pot 2), with the group winners hosting the second leg. Teams from the same association or the same group could be drawn into the same tie.

== Qualifying stages ==
In the qualifying stages, each tie was played on a home-and-away two-legged basis. If tied on aggregate, the away goals rule was used. If still tied, extra time was not played, and a penalty shoot-out was used to determine the winner (Regulations Article 29). The qualifying stages were structured as follows:

- First stage (6 teams): The three winners of the first stage advanced to the second stage to join the 13 teams which were given byes to the second stage.
- Second stage (16 teams): The eight winners of the second stage advanced to the third stage.
- Third stage (8 teams): The four winners of the third stage advanced to the group stage to join the 28 direct entrants. The two best teams eliminated in the third stage entered the Copa Sudamericana second stage.

=== First stage ===
Team 1	Agg.	Team 2	1st leg	2nd leg
Delfín (Ecuador)	5–1	(Paraguay) Nacional	3–0	2–1
Deportivo La Guaira (Venezuela)	2–2 (a)	(Peru) Real Garcilaso	1–0	1–2
Bolívar (Bolivia)	5–6	(Uruguay) Defensor Sporting	2–4	3–2

=== Second stage ===
Team 1	Agg.	Team 2	1st leg	2nd leg
Danubio (Uruguay)	4–5	(Brazil) Atlético Mineiro	2–2	2–3
Melgar (Peru)	1–0	Universidad de Chile	1–0	0–0
The Strongest (Bolivia)	2–6	(Paraguay) Libertad	1–1	1–5
Palestino (Chile)	2–2 (4–1 p)	(Colombia) Independiente Medellín	1–1	1–1
Talleres (Argentina)	2–0	(Brazil) São Paulo	2–0	0–0
Deportivo La Guaira (Venezuela)	0–1	(Colombia) Atlético Nacional	0–1	0–0
Delfín (Ecuador)	1–1 (a)	(Venezuela) Caracas	1–1	0–0
Defensor Sporting (Uruguay)	3–1	(Ecuador) Barcelona	3–0	0–1

Notes

1. CONMEBOL awarded Defensor Sporting a 3–0 win as a result of Barcelona fielding the ineligible player Sebastián Pérez. The match originally ended 1–2.

=== Third stage ===
Team 1	Agg.	Team 2	1st leg	2nd leg
Defensor Sporting (Uruguay)	0–2	(Brazil) Atlético Mineiro	0–2	0–0
Melgar (Peru)	3–2	(Venezuela) Caracas	2–0	1–2
Libertad (Paraguay)	1–1 (5–4 p)	(Colombia) Atlético Nacional	1–0	0–1
Talleres (Argentina)	3–4	(Chile) Palestino	2–2	1–2

=== Copa Sudamericana qualification ===
The two best teams eliminated in the third stage entered the Copa Sudamericana second stage. Only matches in the third stage were considered for the ranking of teams.

Pos	Third stage losers	Pld	W	D	L	GF	GA	GD	Pts	Qualification
1	(Colombia) Atlético Nacional	2	1	0	1	1	1	0	3	Copa Sudamericana
2	(Venezuela) Caracas	2	1	0	1	2	3	−1	3	Copa Sudamericana
3	(Argentina) Talleres	2	0	1	1	3	4	−1	1	
4	(Uruguay) Defensor Sporting	2	0	1	1	0	2	−2	1	

Source: CONMEBOL
Rules for classification: 1) Points; 2) Goal difference; 3) Goals scored; 4) Away goals scored; 5) CONMEBOL ranking (Regulations Article 21).

== Group stage ==
In the group stage, each group was played on a home-and-away round-robin basis. The teams were ranked according to the following criteria: 1. Points (3 points for a win, 1 point for a draw, and 0 points for a loss); 2. Goal difference; 3. Goals scored; 4. Away goals scored; 5. CONMEBOL ranking (Regulations Article 28).

The winners and runners-up of each group advanced to the round of 16 of the final stages. The third-placed teams of each group entered the Copa Sudamericana second stage.

=== Group A ===
Pos	Team	Pld	W	D	L	GF	GA	GD	Pts	Qualification	INT	RIV	PAL	ALI
1	(Brazil) Internacional	6	4	2	0	11	6	+5	14	Round of 16	—	2–2	3–2	2–0
2	(Argentina) River Plate	6	2	4	0	10	5	+5	10	Round of 16	2–2	—	0–0	3–0
3	(Chile) Palestino	6	2	1	3	7	7	0	7	Copa Sudamericana	0–1	0–2	—	3–0
4	(Peru) Alianza Lima	6	0	1	5	2	12	−10	1		0–1	1–1	1–2	—

Source: CONMEBOL

=== Group B ===
Pos	Team	Pld	W	D	L	GF	GA	GD	Pts	Qualification	CRU	EME	LAR	HUR
1	(Brazil) Cruzeiro	6	5	0	1	11	2	+9	15	Round of 16	—	1–2	2–0	4–0
2	(Ecuador) Emelec	6	2	3	1	6	5	+1	9	Round of 16	0–1	—	2–2	0–0
3	(Venezuela) Deportivo Lara	6	1	2	3	4	10	−6	5	Copa Sudamericana	0–2	0–0	—	2–1
4	(Argentina) Huracán	6	1	1	4	5	9	−4	4		0–1	1–2	3–0	—

Source: CONMEBOL

=== Group C ===
Pos	Team	Pld	W	D	L	GF	GA	GD	Pts	Qualification	OLI	GOD	CRI	UDC
1	(Paraguay) Olimpia	6	2	3	1	9	6	+3	9	Round of 16	—	2–1	0–1	1–1
2	(Argentina) Godoy Cruz	6	2	3	1	5	3	+2	9	Round of 16	0–0	—	2–0	1–0
3	(Peru) Sporting Cristal	6	2	1	3	8	11	−3	7	Copa Sudamericana	0–3	1–1	—	2–0
4	(Chile) Universidad de Concepción	6	1	3	2	9	11	−2	6		3–3	0–0	5–4	—

Source: CONMEBOL

=== Group D ===
Pos	Team	Pld	W	D	L	GF	GA	GD	Pts	Qualification	FLA	LDQ	PEÑ	SJO
1	(Brazil) Flamengo	6	3	1	2	11	5	+6	10	Round of 16	—	3–1	0–1	6–1
2	(Ecuador) LDU Quito	6	3	1	2	12	8	+4	10	Round of 16	2–1	—	2–0	4–0
3	(Uruguay) Peñarol	6	3	1	2	7	5	+2	10	Copa Sudamericana	0–0	1–0	—	4–0
4	(Bolivia) San José	6	1	1	4	7	19	−12	4		0–1	3–3	3–1	—

Source: CONMEBOL

=== Group E ===
Pos	Team	Pld	W	D	L	GF	GA	GD	Pts	Qualification	CPO	NAC	CAM	ZAM
1	(Paraguay) Cerro Porteño	6	4	1	1	10	5	+5	13	Round of 16	—	1–0	4–1	2–1
2	(Uruguay) Nacional	6	4	1	1	5	2	+3	13	Round of 16	1–1	—	1–0	1–0
3	(Brazil) Atlético Mineiro	6	2	0	4	6	10	−4	6	Copa Sudamericana	0–1	0–1	—	3–2
4	(Venezuela) Zamora	6	1	0	5	6	10	−4	3		2–1	0–1	1–2	—

Source: CONMEBOL

=== Group F ===
Pos	Team	Pld	W	D	L	GF	GA	GD	Pts	Qualification	PAL	SLO	MEL	JUN
1	(Brazil) Palmeiras	6	5	0	1	13	1	+12	15	Round of 16	—	1–0	3–0	3–0
2	(Argentina) San Lorenzo	6	3	1	2	4	2	+2	10	Round of 16	1–0	—	2–0	1–0
3	(Peru) Melgar	6	2	1	3	2	9	−7	7	Copa Sudamericana	0–4	0–0	—	1–0
4	(Colombia) Junior	6	1	0	5	1	8	−7	3		0–2	1–0	0–1	—

Source: CONMEBOL

=== Group G ===
Pos	Team	Pld	W	D	L	GF	GA	GD	Pts	Qualification	BOC	CAP	TOL	WIL
1	(Argentina) Boca Juniors	6	3	2	1	11	6	+5	11	Round of 16	—	2–1	3–0	4–0
2	(Brazil) Athletico Paranaense	6	3	0	3	11	6	+5	9	Round of 16	3–0	—	1–0	4–0
3	(Colombia) Deportes Tolima	6	2	2	2	7	8	−1	8	Copa Sudamericana	2–2	1–0	—	2–2
4	(Bolivia) Jorge Wilstermann	6	1	2	3	5	14	−9	5		0–0	3–2	0–2	—

Source: CONMEBOL

=== Group H ===
Pos	Team	Pld	W	D	L	GF	GA	GD	Pts	Qualification	LIB	GRE	UCA	ROS
1	(Paraguay) Libertad	6	4	0	2	11	7	+4	12	Round of 16	—	0–2	4–1	2–0
2	(Brazil) Grêmio	6	3	1	2	8	4	+4	10	Round of 16	0–1	—	2–0	3–1
3	(Chile) Universidad Católica	6	2	1	3	7	11	−4	7	Copa Sudamericana	2–3	1–0	—	2–1
4	(Argentina) Rosario Central	6	1	2	3	6	10	−4	5		2–1	1–1	1–1	—

Source: CONMEBOL

== Final stages ==
Starting from the round of 16, the teams played a single-elimination tournament with the following rules:

- In the round of 16, quarter-finals and semi-finals, each tie was played on a home-and-away two-legged basis, with the higher-seeded team hosting the second leg (Regulations Article 23). If tied on aggregate, the away goals rule was used. If still tied, extra time was not played, and a penalty shoot-out was used to determine the winners (Regulations Article 29).
- The final was played as a single match at a venue pre-selected by CONMEBOL, with the higher-seeded team designated as the "home" team for administrative purposes (Regulations Article 26). If tied after regulation, 30 minutes of extra time were played. If still tied after extra time, a penalty shoot-out was used to determine the winners (Regulations Article 30).

=== Seeding ===
Starting from the round of 16, the teams are seeded according to their results in the group stage, with the group winners (Pot 1) seeded 1–8, and the group runners-up (Pot 2) seeded 9–16.

Seed	Grp	Team	Pld	W	D	L	GF	GA	GD	Pts	Round of 16 draw
1	F	(Brazil) Palmeiras	6	5	0	1	13	1	+12	15	Pot 1
2	B	(Brazil) Cruzeiro	6	5	0	1	11	2	+9	15	Pot 1
3	A	(Brazil) Internacional	6	4	2	0	11	6	+5	14	Pot 1
4	E	(Paraguay) Cerro Porteño	6	4	1	1	10	5	+5	13	Pot 1
5	H	(Paraguay) Libertad	6	4	0	2	11	7	+4	12	Pot 1
6	G	(Argentina) Boca Juniors	6	3	2	1	11	6	+5	11	Pot 1
7	D	(Brazil) Flamengo	6	3	1	2	11	5	+6	10	Pot 1
8	C	(Paraguay) Olimpia	6	2	3	1	9	6	+3	9	Pot 1
9	E	(Uruguay) Nacional	6	4	1	1	5	2	+3	13	Pot 2
10	A	(Argentina) River Plate	6	2	4	0	10	5	+5	10	Pot 2
11	D	(Ecuador) LDU Quito	6	3	1	2	12	8	+4	10	Pot 2
12	H	(Brazil) Grêmio	6	3	1	2	8	4	+4	10	Pot 2
13	F	(Argentina) San Lorenzo	6	3	1	2	4	2	+2	10	Pot 2
14	G	(Brazil) Athletico Paranaense	6	3	0	3	11	6	+5	9	Pot 2
15	C	(Argentina) Godoy Cruz	6	2	3	1	5	3	+2	9	Pot 2
16	B	(Ecuador) Emelec	6	2	3	1	6	5	+1	9	Pot 2

Source: CONMEBOL
Rules for classification: 1) Higher position in group; 2) Points; 3) Goal difference; 4) Goals scored; 5) Away goals scored; 6) CONMEBOL ranking (Regulations Article 22.i).

=== Bracket ===
The bracket was decided based on the round of 16 draw, which was held on 13 May 2019.

Round of 16
12	(Brazil) Grêmio	2	3	5
5	(Paraguay) Libertad	0	0	0
15	(Argentina) Godoy Cruz	2	0	2
1	(Brazil) Palmeiras	2	4	6
16	(Ecuador) Emelec	2	0	2 (2)
7	(Brazil) Flamengo (p)	0	2	2 (4)
9	(Uruguay) Nacional	0	0	0
3	(Brazil) Internacional	1	2	3
10	(Argentina) River Plate (p)	0	0	0 (4)
2	(Brazil) Cruzeiro	0	0	0 (2)
13	(Argentina) San Lorenzo	0	1	1
4	(Paraguay) Cerro Porteño	0	2	2
11	(Ecuador) LDU Quito	3	1	4
8	(Paraguay) Olimpia	1	1	2
14	(Brazil) Athletico Paranaense	0	0	0
6	(Argentina) Boca Juniors	1	2	3

Quarter-finals
12	(Brazil) Grêmio (a)	0	2	2
1	(Brazil) Palmeiras	1	1	2
7	(Brazil) Flamengo	2	1	3
3	(Brazil) Internacional	0	1	1
10	(Argentina) River Plate	2	1	3
4	(Paraguay) Cerro Porteño	0	1	1
11	(Ecuador) LDU Quito	0	0	0
6	(Argentina) Boca Juniors	3	0	3

Semi-finals
12	(Brazil) Grêmio	1	0	1
7	(Brazil) Flamengo	1	5	6
10	(Argentina) River Plate	2	0	2
2	(Argentina) Boca Juniors	0	1	1

Final
23 November – Lima
7	(Brazil) Flamengo	2
10	(Argentina) River Plate	1

=== Round of 16 ===
Team 1	Agg.	Team 2	1st leg	2nd leg
River Plate (Argentina)	0–0 (4–2 p)	(Brazil) Cruzeiro	0–0	0–0
Godoy Cruz (Argentina)	2–6	(Brazil) Palmeiras	2–2	0–4
Emelec (Ecuador)	2–2 (2–4 p)	(Brazil) Flamengo	2–0	0–2
LDU Quito (Ecuador)	4–2	(Paraguay) Olimpia	3–1	1–1
Athletico Paranaense (Brazil)	0–3	(Argentina) Boca Juniors	0–1	0–2
Nacional (Uruguay)	0–3	(Brazil) Internacional	0–1	0–2
Grêmio (Brazil)	5–0	(Paraguay) Libertad	2–0	3–0
San Lorenzo (Argentina)	1–2	(Paraguay) Cerro Porteño	0–0	1–2

=== Quarter-finals ===
Team 1	Agg.	Team 2	1st leg	2nd leg
River Plate (Argentina)	3–1	(Paraguay) Cerro Porteño	2–0	1–1
Grêmio (Brazil)	2–2 (a)	(Brazil) Palmeiras	0–1	2–1
Flamengo (Brazil)	3–1	(Brazil) Internacional	2–0	1–1
LDU Quito (Ecuador)	0–3	(Argentina) Boca Juniors	0–3	0–0

=== Semi-finals ===
Team 1	Agg.	Team 2	1st leg	2nd leg
River Plate (Argentina)	2–1	(Argentina) Boca Juniors	2–0	0–1
Grêmio (Brazil)	1–6	(Brazil) Flamengo	1–1	0–5

=== Final ===
23 November 2019
15:00 UTC−5

Flamengo (Brazil)	2–1	(Argentina) River Plate
Gabriel Barbosa 89', 90+2'	Report	Borré 14'

Estadio Monumental, Lima
Attendance: 78,573
Referee: Roberto Tobar (Chile)

== Statistics ==
=== Top scorers ===
Rank	Player	Team	1Q1	1Q2	2Q1	2Q2	3Q1	3Q2	GS1	GS2	GS3	GS4	GS5	GS6	⅛F1	⅛F2	QF1	QF2	SF1	SF2	F	Total
1	(Brazil) Gabriel Barbosa	(Brazil) Flamengo							1	1						2		1		2	2	9
2	(Argentina) Adrián Martínez	(Paraguay) Libertad			1	3			2													6
2	(Argentina) Marco Ruben	(Brazil) Athletico Paranaense								1	3		1	1								6
2	(Brazil) Gustavo Scarpa	(Brazil) Palmeiras							1				2	1		1	1					6
5	(Brazil) Bruno Henrique	(Brazil) Flamengo											1				2		1	1		5
5	(Brazil) Ricardo Oliveira	(Brazil) Atlético Mineiro			2	2						1										5
5	(Chile) Patricio Rubio	(Chile) Universidad de Concepción							4				1									5

Source: CONMEBOL.com

=== Top assists ===
Rank	Player	Team	Assists
1	(Brazil) Bruno Henrique	(Brazil) Flamengo	5
2	(Peru) Joel Sánchez	(Peru) Melgar	4
3	(Brazil) Alisson	(Brazil) Grêmio	3
3	(Paraguay) Alan Benítez	(Paraguay) Libertad	3
3	(Ecuador) Juan Cazares	(Brazil) Atlético Mineiro	3
3	(Brazil) Dudu	(Brazil) Palmeiras	3
3	(Brazil) Éverton Ribeiro	(Brazil) Flamengo	3
3	(Uruguay) Nicolás López	(Brazil) Internacional	3
3	(Venezuela) Ricardo Martins	(Venezuela) Caracas	3
3	(Brazil) Rafael Sóbis	(Brazil) Internacional	3

Source: CONMEBOL.com

=== Team of the tournament ===
OptaJavier Stats Perform selected the following 11 players as the team of the tournament.

Position	Player	Team
Goalkeeper	(Argentina) Esteban Andrada	(Argentina) Boca Juniors
Defenders	(Argentina) Lucas Martínez Quarta	(Argentina) River Plate
Defenders	(Brazil) Rodrigo Caio	(Brazil) Flamengo
Defenders	(Spain) Pablo Marí	(Brazil) Flamengo
Midfielders	(Argentina) Enzo Pérez	(Argentina) River Plate
Midfielders	(Brazil) Everton	(Brazil) Grêmio
Midfielders	(Brazil) Gustavo Scarpa	(Brazil) Palmeiras
Midfielders	(Argentina) Ignacio Fernández	(Argentina) River Plate
Midfielders	(Brazil) Everton Ribeiro	(Brazil) Flamengo
Forwards	(Brazil) Gabriel Barbosa	(Brazil) Flamengo
Forwards	(Brazil) Bruno Henrique	(Brazil) Flamengo

== See also ==
- 2019 Copa Sudamericana
- 2020 Recopa Sudamericana
