= Gabriel Costa (footballer) =

Uruguayan footballer (born 1990)

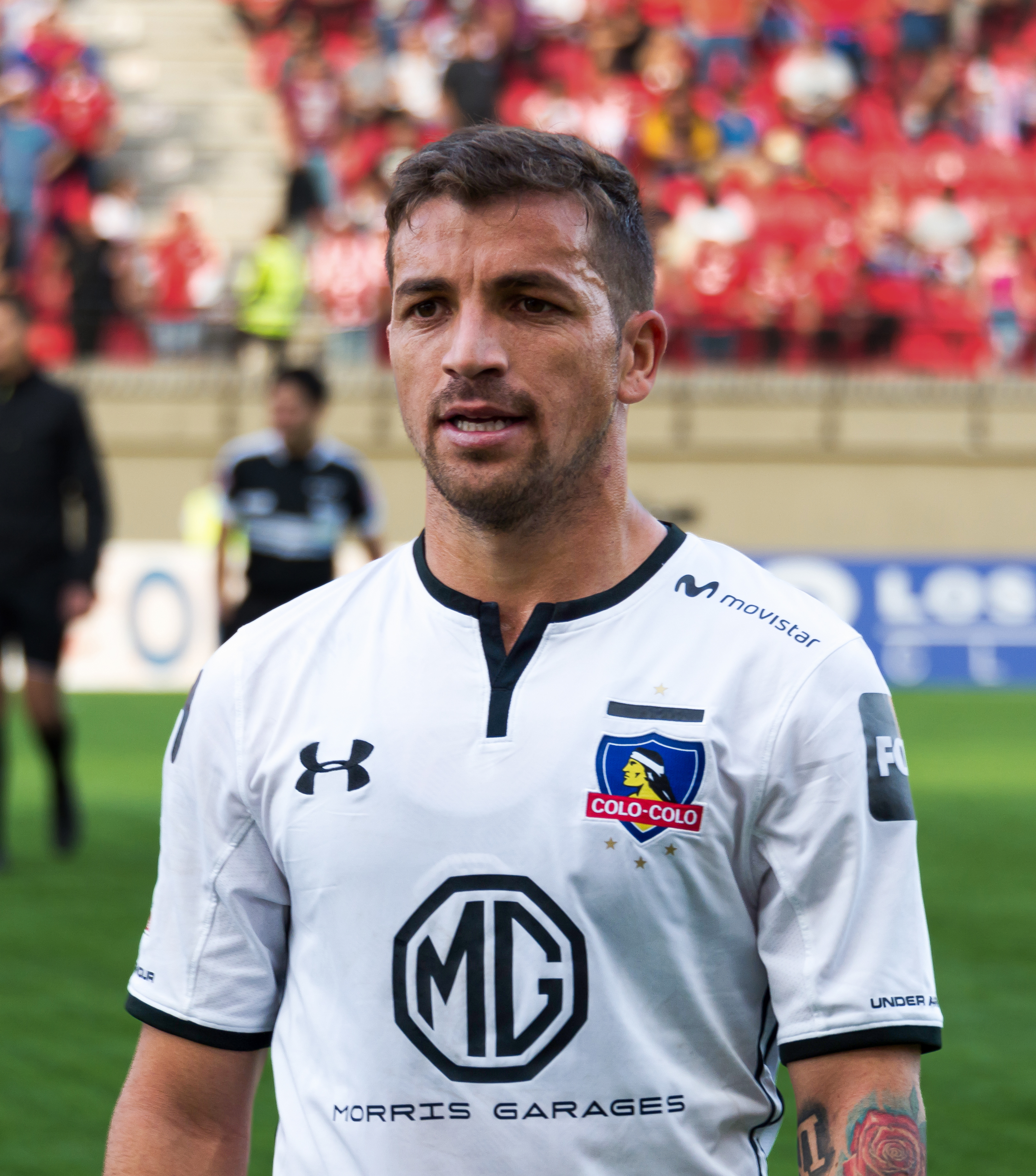
- Costa with Colo-Colo in 2019

Personal information
- Full name: Basilio Gabriel Costa Heredia
- Date of birth: 2 April 1990 (age 36)
- Place of birth: San Carlos, Uruguay
- Height: 1.70 m (5 ft 7 in)
- Position: Midfielder

Team information
- Current team: Club Atlético River Plate (Montevideo)

Youth career
- River Plate Montevideo

Senior career*
| Years | Team | Apps | (Gls) |
| 2010–2012 | River Plate Montevideo | 0 | (0) |
| 2011–2012 | → Rocha (loan) | 19 | (2) |
| 2012 | Bella Vista | 11 | (0) |
| 2013–2016 | Rentistas | 14 | (4) |
| 2014–2015 | → Alianza Lima (loan) | 60 | (21) |
| 2016 | → Sporting Cristal (loan) | 17 | (3) |
| 2017–2018 | Sporting Cristal | 73 | (28) |
| 2019–2022 | Colo-Colo | 98 | (27) |
| 2023–2024 | Alianza Lima | 35 | (6) |
| 2024–2025 | Universitario | 31 | (1) |
| 2026- | Club Atlético River Plate (Montevideo) | 0 | (0) |

International career^{‡}
| 2019–2022 | Peru | 12 | (0) |
- * Club domestic league appearances and goals as of 16:24, 23 March 2024 (UTC) ‡ National team caps and goals as of 16:24, 23 March 2024 (UTC)

Basilio Gabriel Costa Heredia (born 2 April 1990), known as Gabriel Costa, is a professional footballer who plays as a midfielder for club Club Atlético River Plate (Montevideo). Born in Uruguay, Costa represents Peru internationally.

== Club career ==
Costa played in the youth ranks of River Plate de Montevideo. In 2011, he was loaned to Rocha FC in order to get more minutes, scoring 2 goals in 19 matches. Costa signed for Bella Vista in 2012, where he made his debut in the Uruguayan First Division under manager Guillermo Sanguinetti.

The next season, he played for Rentistas before emigrating to Peru in 2014. He spent two seasons with Alianza Lima and three seasons with Sporting Cristal between 2014 and 2018. In 2019, Costa moved to Chile and joined Colo-Colo, spending four seasons with them.

Back to Peru, Costa rejoined Alianza Lima in 2023. In July 2024, he switched to Universitario, becoming one of the few players who have played for the Big Three of Peruvian football clubs.

== International career ==
Born in Uruguay, Costa was nationalized after years in Peru and gained a Peruvian passport. He debuted for the Peru national team in a friendly 1–0 loss to Ecuador on 6 September 2019.

== Career statistics ==
=== Club ===
As of 21 July 2019

| Club | Season | League | | Cup | | Continental | | Other^{1} | | Total | |
| Club | Season | Apps | Goals | Apps | Goals | Apps | Goals | Apps | Goals | Apps | Goals |
|---|---|---|---|---|---|---|---|---|---|---|---|
| Bella Vista | 2012–13 | 11 | 0 | — | | | | | | 11 | 0 |
| Rentistas | 2013–14 | 14 | 4 | — | | | | | | 14 | 4 |
| Alianza Lima | 2014 | 30 | 12 | 10 | 1 | 2 | 0 | — | | 42 | 13 |
| Alianza Lima | 2015 | 30 | 9 | 10 | 5 | 2 | 0 | — | | 42 | 14 |
| Alianza Lima | Total | 60 | 21 | 20 | 6 | 4 | 0 | 0 | 0 | 84 | 27 |
| Sporting Cristal | 2016 | 17 | 3 | — | | 6 | 1 | — | | 23 | 4 |
| Sporting Cristal | 2017 | 30 | 2 | — | | 6 | 0 | — | | 36 | 2 |
| Sporting Cristal | 2018 | 43 | 26 | — | | 2 | 0 | — | | 45 | 26 |
| Sporting Cristal | Total | 90 | 31 | 0 | 0 | 14 | 1 | 0 | 0 | 104 | 32 |
| Colo-Colo | 2019 | 12 | 4 | 3 | 3 | 2 | 0 | 0 | 0 | 17 | 7 |
| Total | | 187 | 60 | 23 | 9 | 20 | 1 | 0 | 0 | 230 | 70 |

^{1} Includes Superliga Colombiana

== Honours ==
=== Club ===
Alianza Lima

- Torneo del Inca (1): 2014

Sporting Cristal

- Peruvian Primera División (2): 2016, 2018

Colo-Colo

- Copa Chile (2): 2019, 2021
- Supercopa de Chile (1): 2022

Universitario de Deportes

- Peruvian Primera División: 2024
- Peruvian Primera División: 2025
