= Fabio Rojas (footballer) =

Peruvian footballer (born 1999)

Personal information
- Full name: Fabio Renato Rojas Prieto
- Date of birth: 4 August 1999 (age 27)
- Place of birth: Comas, Peru
- Height: 1.79 m (5 ft 10 in)
- Positions: Centre-back; right-back

Team information
- Current team: Atlético Grau
- Number: 16

Youth career
- –2011: Cantolao
- 2011–2017: Alianza Lima

Senior career*
Years	Team	Apps	(Gls)
2019–2023	Alianza Lima	29	(1)
2019	→ UTC Cajamarca (loan)	19	(0)
2020	→ Ayacucho (loan)	23	(0)
2023	→ Atlético Grau (loan)	17	(0)
2024–	Atlético Grau	30	(0)

International career
2013	Peru U15		
2017	Peru U18		
2018–2019	Peru U20	4	(0)
- * Club domestic league appearances and goals as of 21:44, 6 December 2025 (UTC)

Fabio Renato Rojas Prieto (born 4 August 1999) is a Peruvian footballer who plays as a centre-back or right-back for Peruvian Primera División side Atlético Grau.

== Career ==
=== Club career ===
Rojas started playing football at the age of five and later joined Alianza Lima from Academia Deportiva Cantolao in 2011.

He was promoted to the first on 30 March 2017 and on 9 April 2017, 17-year old Rojas got his official debut as a starter for Alianza against Juan Aurich. He played a total of three games in the 2017 season. In the following season, Rojas made no appearances for the first team but was a regular starter of the club's reserve team. To gain some experience, he was loaned out to UTC Cajamarca for the 2019 season.

Despite a successful loan spell at UTC with 19 appearances in the Peruvian Primera División, he was loaned out to Ayacucho FC for the 2020 season.

After two seasons at Alianza Lima after his loan spells at UTS and Ayacucho, Rojas was once again loaned out, this time ahead of the 2023 season, to Atlético Grau for the rest of the year. He left Grau at the end of the year and returned to Alianza.

Ahead of the 2024 season, it was confirmed that Rojas would continue at Atlético Grau.

=== International career ===
In 2014, Rojas was a part of the Peruvian U15 national team, who won gold in the 2014 Summer Youth Olympics in Nanjing and in 2017, he was also a part of the U18 national team.

Rojas was called up for the Peruvian U20 national team in January 2019 who was going to play in the 2019 South American U-20 Championship. Rojas was also the captain of the U20 team.

== Personal life ==
Rojas' uncle is the former Deportivo de La Coruña forward William Huapaya.
