= Gianmarco Gambetta =

Peruvian footballer (born 1991)

Personal information
- Full name: Gianmarco Gambetta Sponza
- Date of birth: 2 May 1991 (age 35)
- Place of birth: Lima, Peru
- Height: 1.91 m (6 ft 3 in)
- Position: Center back

Youth career
- Universidad San Martín

Senior career*
Years	Team	Apps	(Gls)
2012–2014	Universidad San Martín	28	(0)
2014	Argentinos Juniors	10	(0)
2014	FBC Melgar	1	(0)
2015–2018	Juan Aurich	50	(1)
2018	Alianza Lima	12	(1)
2019–2020	Alianza Universidad	34	(0)
2021	Carlos Stein	1	(0)
2021–2022	AD Cantolao	22	(0)
2023	UTC Cajamarca	14	(0)

International career^{‡}
2013–	Peru	2	(0)
- * Club domestic league appearances and goals as of 21 March 2019 ‡ National team caps and goals as of 12 October 2013

Gianmarco Gambetta Sponza (born 2 May 1991) is a Peruvian/Italian footballer who plays as a center-back.
