= Ricardo Martins =

Portuguese-Venezuelan footballer (born 1990)

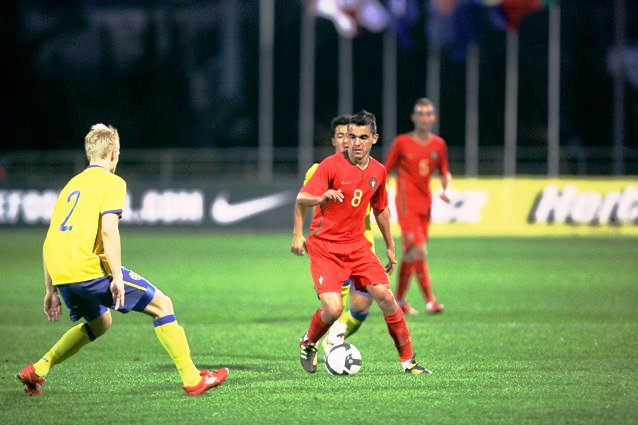
- Martins with Portugal U21

Personal information
- Full name: Ricardo Manuel Cardoso Martins
- Date of birth: 24 January 1990 (age 36)
- Place of birth: El Tigre, Venezuela
- Height: 1.81 m (5 ft 11 in)
- Position: Midfielder

Team information
- Current team: Dynamo Puerto

Youth career
- Deportivo Anzoátegui
- 2007–2009: Rio Ave

Senior career*
Years	Team	Apps	(Gls)
2008–2012	Rio Ave	0	(0)
2009–2010	→ Gondomar (loan)	23	(1)
2010–2011	→ Ribeirão (loan)	24	(3)
2011–2012	→ Aves (loan)	9	(0)
2012–2013	Famalicão	28	(6)
2013–2017	Deportivo Anzoátegui	109	(20)
2017–2019	Caracas	64	(7)
2020–2021	Atlético Venezuela	38	(4)
2022	Estudiantes	11	(0)
2022	Mineros Guayana	11	(1)
2023–	Dynamo Puerto		

International career
2008	Portugal U18	4	(1)
2011	Portugal U21	6	(0)
- * Club domestic league appearances and goals as of 15:04, 18 April 2023 (UTC)

Ricardo Manuel Cardoso Martins (born 24 January 1990) is a professional footballer who plays as a midfielder for Dynamo Puerto.

== Club career ==
=== Portugal ===
Born in El Tigre, Anzoátegui to Portuguese parents, Martins finished his development at Rio Ave. He spent his first three seasons as a senior with three clubs, his only experience in the Liga de Honra being with Aves in 2011–12; his debut in the competition was on 21 August 2011, in a 3–2 away loss against União da Madeira.

=== Venezuela ===
In July 2013, as it was his intention to eventually play for the Venezuela national team, Martins left Portugal and moved to the Primera División by signing for Deportivo Anzoátegui. He scored his first goal in top-flight football on 25 August, in a 3–2 home win over Tucanes de Amazonas.

Nicknamed Kuki, Martins subsequently remained in the league, appearing for Caracas, Atlético Venezuela, Estudiantes de Mérida and Mineros de Guayana. He won the national championship with Caracas in the 2019 season, contributing five goals – three from penalty kicks – in 16 games; he also endured a spell in the sidelines, however, due to an anterior cruciate ligament injury.

Martins joined Dynamo Puerto of Segunda División in 2023.

== International career ==
Martins represented Portugal at youth level. He won his first cap for the under-21 team on 9 February 2011, featuring the first half of the 3–1 friendly win over Sweden in Cartaxo.

== Honours ==
Caracas

- Venezuelan Primera División: 2019
