= Nilson Loyola =

Peruvian footballer (born 1994)

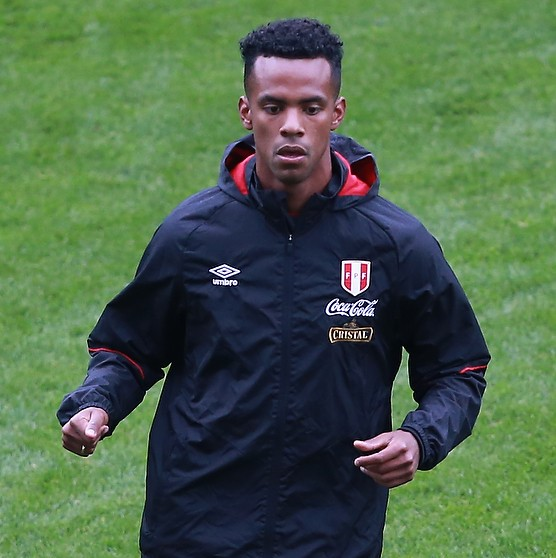
- Loyola training with Peru at the 2018 FIFA World Cup

Personal information
- Full name: Nilson Evair Loyola Morales
- Date of birth: 26 October 1994 (age 32)
- Place of birth: Lima, Peru
- Height: 1.79 m (5 ft 10 in)
- Position: Left back

Team information
- Current team: Sport Boys
- Number: 29

Youth career
- 2004–2013: Sporting Cristal

Senior career*
Years	Team	Apps	(Gls)
2014–2018	Melgar	113	(10)
2019	Goiás	0	(0)
2019–2023	Sporting Cristal	98	(10)
2024	UCV	5	(0)
2025	Deportivo Binacional	0	(0)
2025	Juan Pablo II	9	(0)
2026	Cajamarca	0	(0)
2026–	Sport Boys	3	(0)

International career^{‡}
2016–2023	Peru	10	(0)
- * Club domestic league appearances and goals as of 28 June 2025 ‡ National team caps and goals as of 15:42, 23 March 2026 (UTC)

Nilson Evair Loyola Morales (born 26 October 1994) is a Peruvian footballer who plays as a left-back for Sport Boys.

== Club career ==
Loyola was born in Lima, and started his career as a forward with Sporting Cristal, joining their youth setup in 2004 at the age of ten. He left the club in 2013, after being converted to a left winger.

Loyola joined FBC Melgar in January 2014, initially appearing with the reserves. He made his first team debut on 22 February, starting in a 2–0 away win against Sport Huancayo for the year's Copa Inca.

After another match in the same tournament, Loyola would subsequently spend the rest of the year with the B-side, only returning to the main squad in a 1–1 Torneo Descentralizado home draw against Real Garcilaso, which ensured Melgar's Clausura title.

Loyola was definitely promoted to the main squad ahead of the 2016 season by manager Juan Reynoso, and became an undisputed starter for the side. He scored his first goal for the club on 18 May 2016, netting the equalizer in a 2–1 away loss against former side Sporting Cristal.

On 27 December 2018 Goiás announced the signing of Loyola.

== International career ==
On 22 August 2016 Loyola was called up by Peru national team manager Ricardo Gareca for two 2018 FIFA World Cup qualification matches against Bolivia and Ecuador, but remained unused in both matches. He only made his international debut on 11 November, coming on as a second half substitute for Miguel Trauco in a 4–1 away routing of Paraguay.

On 16 November 2016, as Trauco was suspended, Loyola was handed his first start in a 2–0 home loss against Brazil.

In May 2018 he was named in Peru's provisional 24 man squad for the 2018 FIFA World Cup in Russia.

== Career statistics ==
=== International ===
Statistics accurate as of match played 17 October 2023.

Peru
Year	Apps	Goals
2016	2	0
2017	1	0
2018	3	0
2019	0	0
2020	0	0
2021	0	0
2022	3	0
2023	1	0
Total	10	0

== Honours ==
Melgar

- Torneo Descentralizado: 2015
- Torneo Clausura 2018

Sporting Cristal

- Peruvian Primera División: 2020
- Copa Bicentenario: 2021
- Torneo Apertura: 2021
- Torneo Clausura runner-up: 2020
