= Janio Posito =

Peruvian footballer (born 1989)

Janio Pósito
Personal information
- Full name: Janio Carlo Pósito Olazabal
- Date of birth: 10 October 1989 (age 37)
- Place of birth: Pitipo District
- Height: 1.79 m (5 ft 10 in)
- Position: Forward

Team information
- Current team: Sport Huancayo
- Number: 89

Senior career*
Years	Team	Apps	(Gls)
2007–2008	Sporting Cristal	7	(0)
2009	Coronel Bolognesi	0	(0)
2009–2010	Carlos A. Mannucci	4	(0)
2011–2012	José Gálvez	31	(13)
2012–2016	Los Caimanes	80	(31)
2016	Comerciantes Unidos	8	(2)
2017	Sport Rosario	41	(12)
2018	Alianza Lima	27	(9)
2019	Melgar	9	(1)
2019	UTC	14	(1)
2020	Cusco	20	(4)
2021	Ayacucho FC	30	(5)
2022	Deportivo Binacional	28	(15)
2023-2024	Asociación Deportiva Tarma	65	(21)
2025-	Sport Huancayo	31	(7)
- * Club domestic league appearances and goals as of 29 December 2025

Janio Carlo Pósito Olazabal (born 10 October 1989) is a Peruvian professional footballer who plays as a forward for Sport Huancayo.
