= Giancarlo Carmona =

Peruvian footballer (born 1985)

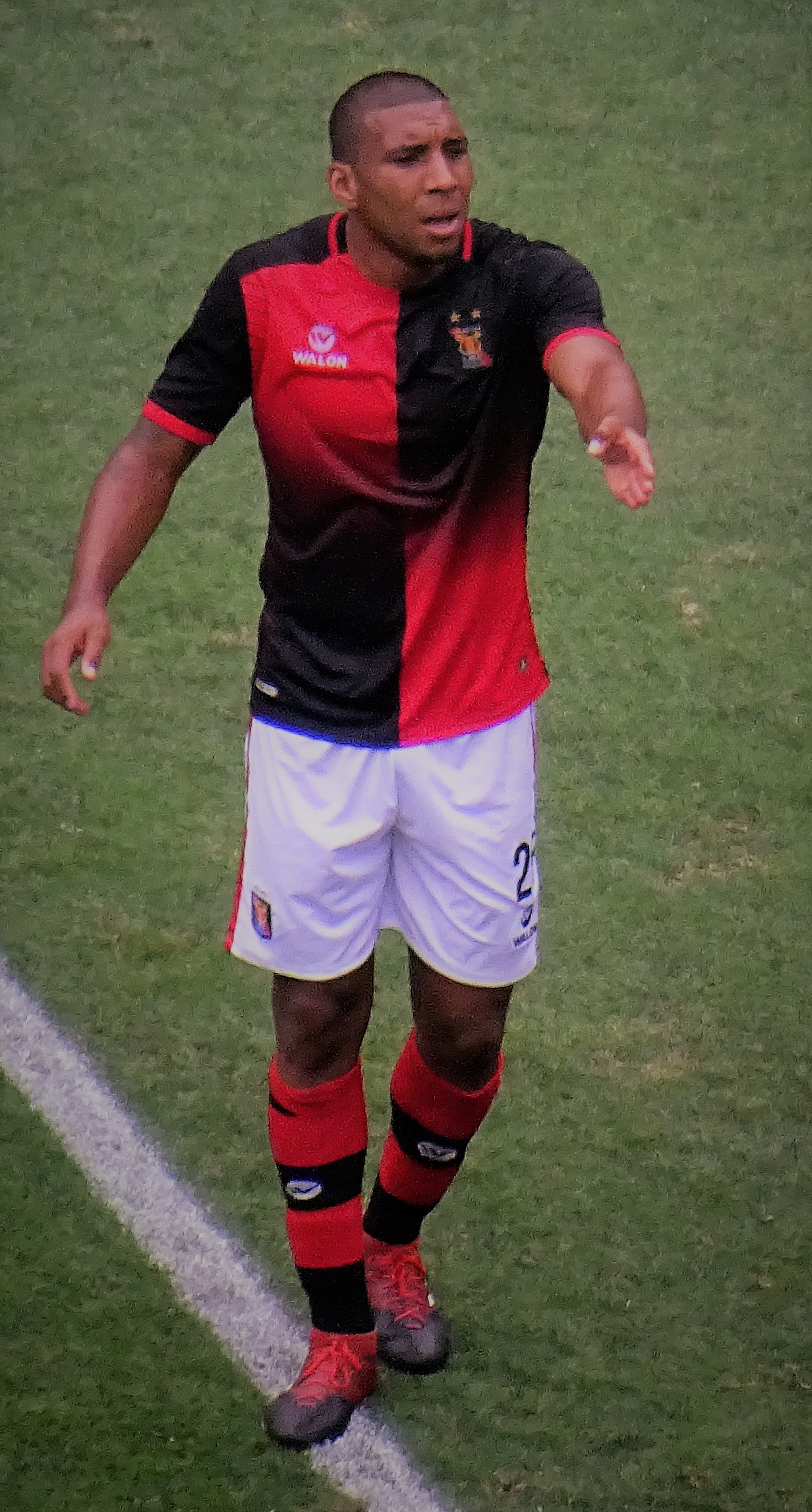
- Carmona in 2018

Personal information
- Full name: Giancarlo Carmona Maldonado
- Date of birth: 12 October 1985 (age 41)
- Place of birth: Lima, Peru
- Height: 1.87 m (6 ft 2 in)
- Position: Centre-back

Team information
- Current team: Academia Deportiva Cantolao
- Number: 25

Youth career
- 1998-2004: Cantolao

Senior career*
Years	Team	Apps	(Gls)
2005–2008	Alianza Atlético	29	(0)
2008–2010	Universitario	81	(4)
2011–2015	San Lorenzo	16	(1)
2012	→ Alianza Lima (loan)	19	(0)
2012–2013	→ Sporting Cristal (loan)	8	(0)
2013–2014	→ José Gálvez FBC (loan)	15	(1)
2014–2015	→ UT Cajamarca (loan)	26	(0)
2015–2016	Mushuc Runa	42	(2)
2016–2017	Ayacucho FC	36	(2)
2017	Cantolao	39	(2)
2018–2019	Melgar	65	(4)
2020-2021	Sport Huancayo	63	(3)
2022-	Academia Deportiva Cantolao	3	(0)

International career
2005	Peru U-20	2	(0)
2011–2012	Peru	5	(0)
Medal record
Representing Peru
Association football
Copa America
Bronze medal – third place	Argentina 2011	{{{2}}}
- * Club domestic league appearances and goals as of 08:02, 24 November 2019 (UTC)

Giancarlo Carmona Maldonado (born 12 October 1985) is a Peruvian footballer who plays as a centre-back for Academia Deportiva Cantolao.

== Career ==
Carmona played his first professional years for Alianza Atlético and Universitario de Deportes in his native country. On 24 December 2010, San Lorenzo de Almagro of the Argentine Primera División bought 50% of his transfer rights for US$500,000.

== Honours ==
Universitario de Deportes

- Torneo Descentralizado: 2009

Sporting Cristal

- Torneo Descentralizado: 2012
