= Pablo Míguez =

Uruguayan footballer (born 1987)

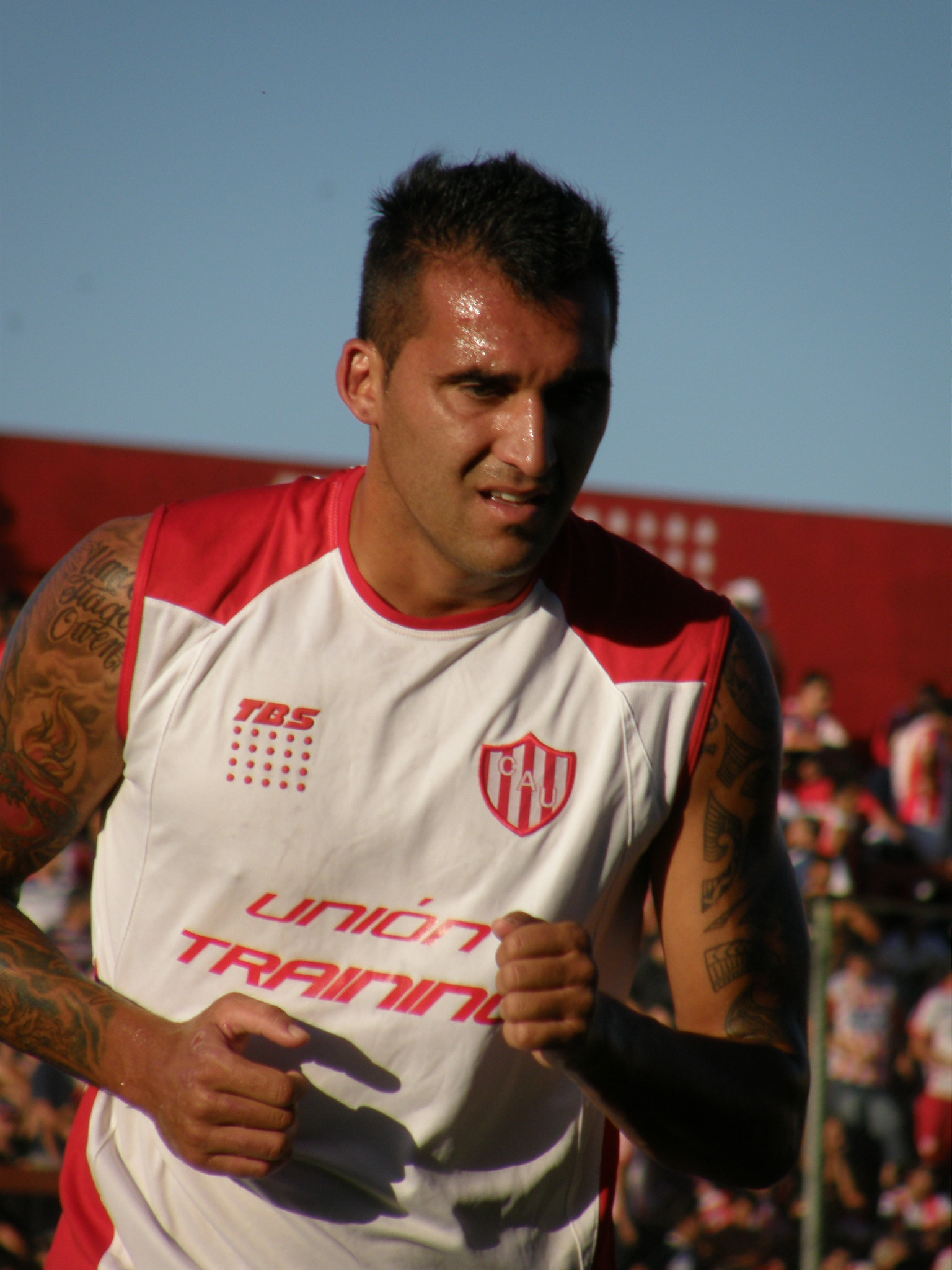

Personal information
- Full name: Pablo Nicolás Míguez Farré
- Date of birth: 19 June 1987 (age 39)
- Place of birth: Montevideo, Uruguay
- Height: 1.83 m (6 ft 0 in)
- Position: Midfielder

Team information
- Current team: Carlos A. Mannucci
- Number: 19

Senior career*
| Years | Team | Apps | (Gls) |
| 2007–2011 | Danubio | 96 | (8) |
| 2011–2013 | Unión | 41 | (0) |
| 2013–2014 | Danubio | 13 | (0) |
| 2014–2016 | Alianza Lima | 46 | (8) |
| 2016 | Olimpo | 15 | (1) |
| 2016–2017 | Puebla | 46 | (3) |
| 2018 | Melgar | 31 | (0) |
| 2019 | Real Garcilaso | 25 | (3) |
| 2020 | Melgar | 22 | (0) |
| 2021– | Alianza Lima | 84 | (6) |
- * Club domestic league appearances and goals as of 9 November 2023

Pablo Nicolás Míguez Farré (born 19 June 1987, in Montevideo, Uruguay) is a Uruguayan footballer currently playing for Carlos A. Mannucci in Liga 2.

== Career statistics ==
As of 15 June 2025

Appearances and goals by club, season and competition
| Club | Division | League | | | Cup | | Continental | | Total | |
| Club | Division | Season | Apps | Goals | Apps | Goals | Apps | Goals | Apps | Goals |
|---|---|---|---|---|---|---|---|---|---|---|
| Danubio | Uruguayan Primera División | 2007-08 | 16 | 2 | — | | — | | 16 | 2 |
| Danubio | Uruguayan Primera División | 2008-09 | 25 | 1 | — | | — | | 25 | 1 |
| Danubio | Uruguayan Primera División | 2009-10 | 27 | 2 | — | | — | | 27 | 2 |
| Danubio | Uruguayan Primera División | 2010-11 | 28 | 3 | — | | — | | 28 | 3 |
| Danubio | Uruguayan Primera División | 2013-14 | 13 | 0 | — | | — | | 13 | 0 |
| Danubio | Total | | 109 | 8 | 0 | 0 | 0 | 0 | 109 | 8 |
| Unión | Argentine Primera División | 2011-12 | 19 | 0 | 1 | 0 | — | | 20 | 0 |
| Unión | Argentine Primera División | 2012-13 | 22 | 0 | 1 | 0 | — | | 23 | 0 |
| Unión | Total | | 41 | 0 | 2 | 0 | 0 | 0 | 43 | 0 |
| Alianza Lima | Peruvian Primera División | 2014 | 25 | 4 | 12 | 2 | 1 | 0 | 38 | 6 |
| Alianza Lima | Peruvian Primera División | 2015 | 21 | 4 | 9 | 0 | 2 | 0 | 32 | 4 |
| Alianza Lima | Peruvian Primera División | 2021 | 27 | 2 | 0 | 0 | — | | 27 | 2 |
| Alianza Lima | Peruvian Primera División | 2022 | 28 | 4 | — | | 5 | 0 | 33 | 4 |
| Alianza Lima | Peruvian Primera División | 2023 | 29 | 0 | — | | 2 | 0 | 31 | 0 |
| Alianza Lima | Total | | 130 | 14 | 21 | 2 | 10 | 0 | 161 | 16 |
| Olimpo | Argentine Primera División | 2016 | 16 | 1 | 1 | 0 | — | | 17 | 1 |
| Puebla | Liga MX | 2016-17 | 29 | 2 | 6 | 0 | — | | 35 | 2 |
| Puebla | Liga MX | 2017-18 | 1 | 0 | 2 | 1 | — | | 3 | 1 |
| Puebla | Total | | 30 | 2 | 8 | 1 | 0 | 0 | 38 | 3 |
| Melgar | Peruvian Primera División | 2018 | 31 | 0 | — | | — | | 31 | 0 |
| Melgar | Peruvian Primera División | 2020 | 22 | 0 | — | | 4 | 0 | 26 | 0 |
| Melgar | Total | | 53 | 0 | 0 | 0 | 4 | 0 | 57 | 0 |
| Real Garcilaso | Peruvian Primera División | 2019 | 25 | 3 | — | | 2 | 0 | 27 | 3 |
| Carlos A. Mannucci | Peruvian Primera División | 2024 | 24 | 1 | — | | — | | 24 | 1 |
| Carlos A. Mannucci | Peruvian Segunda División | 2025 | 9 | 0 | — | | — | | 9 | 0 |
| Carlos A. Mannucci | Total | | 33 | 1 | 0 | 0 | 0 | 0 | 33 | 1 |
| Career total | | | 437 | 29 | 32 | 3 | 16 | 0 | 485 | 32 |
