= Joel Sánchez (Peruvian footballer) =

Peruvian footballer (born 1989)

Personal information
- Full name: Joel Melchor Sánchez Alegría
- Date of birth: 11 June 1989 (age 37)
- Place of birth: Santa Rita de Siguas, Arequipa, Peru
- Height: 1.67 m (5 ft 6 in)
- Position: Attacking midfielder

Team information
- Current team: UTC
- Number: 10

Senior career*
Years	Team	Apps	(Gls)
2006–2008	Total Clean	41	(7)
2009	Total Chalaco	37	(3)
2010	Alianza Lima	34	(3)
2011–2016	Universidad San Martín	90	(9)
2017–2018	Tigres UANL	0	(0)
2017	→ Sporting Cristal (loan)	32	(0)
2018	→ Querétaro (loan)	5	(0)
2018–2022	Melgar	110	(13)
2023–	UTC	58	(2)

International career^{‡}
2009–2016	Peru	11	(0)
Medal record
Representing Peru
Association football
Copa America
Bronze medal – third place	Chile 2015
- * Club domestic league appearances and goals as of 23 October 2024 ‡ National team caps and goals as of 25 March 2017

Joel Melchor Sánchez Alegría (born 11 June 1989) is a Peruvian professional footballer who plays as an attacking midfielder for Liga 1 club UTC. He made 11 appearances for the Peru national team.

== Club career ==
Sánchez made his professional debut with Atlético Universidad on 4 February 2007 in the First Round of the 2007 Torneo Descentralizado season at home against Universitario de Deportes. Manager Roberto Arrelucea allowed him to enter the match in the 65th minute for Luis Collantes, but the match finished in a 2–1 loss for his side.

Sánchez made his league debut for Total Chalaco on 2 February 2009 in a 0–0 home draw against Juan Aurich.

== International career ==
Sánchez played for the Peru national team in 2009.

== Honours ==
Total Clean

- Copa Perú: 2006
- Peruvian Segunda División: 2008

Melgar

- Torneo Clausura: 2018
- Torneo Apertura: 2022
