= Aldair Fuentes =

Peruvian footballer (born 1998)

Personal information
- Full name: Aldair Amarildo Fuentes Siguas
- Date of birth: 25 January 1998 (age 28)
- Place of birth: Pisco, Peru
- Height: 1.94 m (6 ft 4 1/2 in)
- Position: Defensive midfielder

Team information
- Current team: Cusco
- Number: 8

Youth career
- 2014–2017: Alianza Lima

Senior career*
| Years | Team | Apps | (Gls) |
| 2017–2020 | Alianza Lima | 105 | (13) |
| 2020–2024 | Fuenlabrada | 26 | (0) |
| 2022 | → Alianza Lima (loan) | 18 | (0) |
| 2023 | → César Vallejo (loan) | 28 | (2) |
| 2024 | → Alianza Lima (loan) | 10 | (1) |
| 2024 | Alianza Lima | 4 | (0) |
| 2025– | Cusco | 35 | (3) |

International career^{‡}
| 2017 | Peru U20 | 1 | (0) |
| 2019–2020 | Peru U23 | 8 | (0) |
- * Club domestic league appearances and goals as of 1 December 2025 ‡ National team caps and goals as of 1 February 2020

Aldair Amarildo Fuentes Siguas (born 25 January 1998) is a Peruvian footballer who plays as a defensive midfielder for Cusco.

== Club career ==
=== Alianza Lima ===
Born in Pisco, Fuentes joined Alianza Lima's youth setup in 2014. Promoted to the first team for the 2017 campaign, he made his professional debut on 13 February of that year, starting in a 2–0 home win against Universitario de Deportes.

Fuentes scored his first professional goal on 19 February 2017, netting his team's first in a 2–2 home draw against Deportivo Municipal. He subsequently established himself as a starter for the club, playing 38 matches and scoring four times in his first professional season.

=== Fuenlabrada ===
On 4 September 2020, Fuentes moved abroad for the first time in his career, signing a five-year deal with Spanish Segunda División side CF Fuenlabrada. He made his debut for the club on 26 September, playing the last 19 minutes of a 1–0 home win over Albacete Balompié.

==== Return to Alianza Lima (loan) ====
On 27 January 2022, Fuentes returned to his former side Alianza Lima on loan.

== Personal life ==
Fuentes' brother Jean Pierre is also a footballer and a midfielder. Their father Isidro also played professionally, but was a forward.

== Career statistics ==
As of match played 3 November 2024

Appearances and goals by club, season and competition
| Club | Season | League | | | National cup (Note: Includes Copa del Rey) | | Continental | | Other | | Total | |
| Club | Season | Division | Apps | Goals | Apps | Goals | Apps | Goals | Apps | Goals | Apps | Goals |
|---|---|---|---|---|---|---|---|---|---|---|---|---|
| Alianza Lima | 2017 | Peruvian Primera División | 38 | 4 | — | | 2 (Note: Appearance(s) in Copa Sudamericana) | 0 | — | | 40 | 4 |
| Alianza Lima | 2018 | Peruvian Primera División | 37 | 5 | — | | 3 (Note: Appearance(s) in Copa Libertadores) | 0 | — | | 40 | 5 |
| Alianza Lima | 2019 | Peruvian Primera División | 21 | 3 | — | | 1 | 0 | 4 (Note: Appearance(s) in Peruvian Primera División play-offs) | 1 | 26 | 4 |
| Alianza Lima | 2020 | Peruvian Primera División | 5 | 0 | — | | 2 | 0 | — | | 7 | 0 |
| Alianza Lima | Total | | 101 | 12 | — | | 8 | 0 | 4 | 1 | 113 | 13 |
| Fuenlabrada | 2020-21 | Segunda División | 19 | 0 | 3 | 0 | — | | — | | 22 | 0 |
| Fuenlabrada | 2021-22 | Segunda División | 7 | 0 | 1 | 0 | — | | — | | 8 | 0 |
| Fuenlabrada | Total | | 26 | 0 | 4 | 0 | — | | — | | 30 | 0 |
| Alianza Lima (loan) | 2022 | Peruvian Primera División | 18 | 0 | — | | 3 | 0 | 0 | 0 | 21 | 0 |
| César Vallejo | 2023 | Peruvian Primera División | 28 | 2 | — | | 7 | 1 | — | | 35 | 3 |
| Alianza Lima (loan) | 2024 | Peruvian Primera División | 14 | 1 | — | | 3 | 0 | — | | 17 | 1 |
| Career total | | | 187 | 15 | 4 | 0 | 21 | 1 | 4 | 1 | 216 | 17 |
