= Mauricio Affonso =

Uruguayan footballer (born 1992)

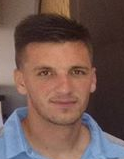
- Mauricio Affonso in 2017

Personal information
- Full name: Mauricio Affonso Prieto
- Date of birth: 26 January 1992 (age 34)
- Place of birth: Melo, Uruguay
- Height: 1.92 m (6 ft 4 in)
- Position: Forward

Team information
- Current team: Cerro Largo F.C.
- Number: 19

Youth career
- –2012: Racing Club

Senior career*
Years	Team	Apps	(Gls)
2012–2015	Racing Club	40	(14)
2015–2016	Al-Shabab	13	(3)
2016–2017	Peñarol	18	(5)
2016	→ Racing Club (loan)	9	(4)
2017–2018	Atlético Tucumán	12	(1)
2018–2019	Alianza Lima	34	(17)
2019–2021	Mamelodi Sundowns	19	(11)
2021–2023	River Plate	13	(5)
2023	Racing Club	29	(12)
2024	Cooper	18	(4)
2025–	Cerro Largo		
- * Club domestic league appearances and goals as of 13:30, 18 September 2023 (UTC)

Mauricio Affonso Prieto (born 26 January 1992) is an Uruguayan professional footballer who plays as a forward for Uruguayann side Cerro Largo .

== Career ==
Affonso started his career playing for Uruguayan side Racing Club in 2012, competing in Primera División. After four years, he moved in Peñarol.

In the pasts five years, Affonso played in diverse countries like Peru, Saudi Arabia and South Africa. In 2021 he signed for River Plate and returned to Uruguayan Primera División.

In September 2023, he returned to Racing Club for a third separate spell.
