= Tulio Etchemaite =

Argentinian footballer

Personal information
- Full name: Tulio Enrique Etchemaite
- Date of birth: 10 July 1987 (age 39)
- Place of birth: Argentina
- Position: Striker

Senior career*
Years	Team	Apps	(Gls)
-2008	Club Atlético River Plate	0	(0)
2008	Socio Águila Fútbol Club	7	(0)
2009/2010	Deportivo Morón	11	(2)
2010	Boca Río Gallegos		
2010-2011	Aragua F.C.	32	(3)
2011	Deportivo Anzoátegui S.C.	7	(0)
2012	C.S. Herediano	2	(0)
-2013	Boca Río Gallegos		
2013-2014	Club Atlético Alvarado	4	(0)
2014-2015	Club Atlético Güemes	13	(3)
2015	Portuguesa F.C.	13	(8)
2015	Aragua F.C.	.19	(8)
2016	Asociación Civil Deportivo Lara	15	(7)
2016	Carabobo F.C.	17	(4)
2017	Lincoln Red Imps F.C.		(11)
2017-2018	Portuguesa F.C.	16	(8)
2018	Sport Rosario	19	(12)
2018	FBC Melgar	7	(1)
2019	Carlos A. Mannucci	10	(3)
2019	Atlético Grau	4	(0)
2020-	Portuguesa F.C.	4	(0)
- * Club domestic league appearances and goals

Tulio Etchemaite (born 10 July 1987 in Argentina) is an Argentinean footballer who now plays for Portuguesa in Venezuela.

== Career ==
Etchemaite started his senior career with Club Atlético River Plate. In 2010, he signed for Aragua in the Venezuelan Primera División, where he made thirty-two league appearances and scored three goals. After that, he played for Deportivo Anzoátegui S.C., C.S. Herediano, Boca Río Gallegos, Club Atlético Alvarado, Club Atlético Güemes, Portuguesa, Asociación Civil Deportivo Lara, Carabobo, Lincoln Red Imps, Sport Rosario, FBC Melgar, Carlos A. Mannucci, and Atlético Grau.
