= Kevin Quevedo =

Peruvian footballer (born 1997)

Personal information
- Full name: Kevin Martín Quevedo Mathey
- Date of birth: 22 February 1997 (age 29)
- Place of birth: Lima, Peru
- Height: 1.74 m (5 ft 9 in)
- Position: Right winger

Team information
- Current team: Alianza Lima
- Number: 27

Youth career
- 2011–2014: Academia Héctor Chumpitaz
- 2014: Acosvinchos
- 2014–2016: Universitario

Senior career*
Years	Team	Apps	(Gls)
2016	Universitario	2	(0)
2017–2019	Alianza Lima	101	(26)
2020	Goiás	1	(0)
2021–2022	Melgar	43	(7)
2023	Deportivo Garcilaso	31	(8)
2024	Universidad Católica	14	(2)
2024–	Alianza Lima	45	(4)

International career^{‡}
2016–2017	Peru U20	11	(1)
2019	Peru U23	9	(3)
2019–	Peru	7	(0)
- * Club domestic league appearances and goals as of 22 March 2026 ‡ National team caps and goals as of 12 November 2025

Kevin Martín Quevedo Mathey (born 22 February 1997) is a Peruvian footballer who plays as a right winger for Liga 1 club Alianza Lima and the Peru national team.

== Club career ==
=== Youth ===
Quevedo's first experience on a youth academy was at Alianza Lima in 2002. Later on, he was transferred to Academia Héctor Chumpitaz, who brought him up and wherein he managed to get through all the ranks. He had such an outstanding 2014 season that, recommended by Universitario's former footballer Héctor Chumpitaz, he was finally signed by that club to play for their Reserves squad. It is mistakenly believed that he has played for Universitario's youth academy because Quevedo played for the Reserves squad before his professional debut. Truth is, Quevedo was transferred to Universitario in 2015 when he had already aged out.

=== Universitario ===
Quevedo made his competitive debut on 13 August 2016 with Universitario in the Peruvian Primera División. The Peruvian icon Roberto Challe was the coach who gave Quevedo his first minutes in the league. Quevedo playing as a substitute in the last 21 minutes ending in a 2–1 loss against Universidad Técnica de Cajamarca.

=== Alianza Lima ===
Quevedo made his debut starting with Alianza Lima on 12 March 2017 against Juan Aurich Peruvian side ending in a 7–2, and scored 4 goals. Alianza Lima would eventually go on to win the title that season. He made his Copa Sudamericana debut on 31 May 2017 match against Club Atlético Independiente.

In the 2018 season, he played 38 games and scored 4 goals. He helped Alianza Lima finish the season in 2nd place.

=== Goiás ===
On February 20, 2020, Quevedo as a free-agent signed a two-year contract with Brazilian club Góias.

=== Melgar ===
On February 8, 2021, Quevedo returned to his home country to join FBC Melgar.

=== Deportivo Garcilaso ===
On February 24, 2023, Kevin Quevedo left Melgar and joined Cusco club, Deportivo Garcilaso.

=== Universidad Catolica ===
On January 1, 2024, Quevado left Peru to Ecuadorian Serie A club Universidad Católica.

== International career ==
=== Youth ===
He was first called up for Peru national under-20 football team during its attempt to qualify for the 2017 FIFA U-20 World Cup. Peru performed poorly in the 2017 South American U-20 Championship, with the team finished bottom with two draws and two losses. Subsequently, he was called up for the Peru national under-23 football team to represent Peru in the 2019 Pan American Games, which Peru made its football debut as hosts. The country's youth team performed poorly as well, with Peru finishing bottom in their group, but Quevedo earned praise for his performance, scoring one goal in process, and was highly recommended by manager of the U-23 team, Nolberto Solano.

However, his career was dented due to the La Videna Disco scandal when he did not appear to train with Peru Olympic football team for the 2020 CONMEBOL Pre-Olympic Tournament. Subsequently, it was discovered that he was instigated by three other members of the senior squad, Andy Polo, Jefferson Farfán and Raúl Ruidíaz. As for the result, Kevin Quevedo was suspended from the Olympic team by the FPF while the Peru Olympic team would go on finishing bottom and failed to qualify for the 2020 Summer Olympics.

=== Senior ===
He made his debut in the encounter against Ecuador in a friendly game on 6 September 2019, where Peru was beaten 0–1 by Ecuador.

== Career statistics ==
=== Club ===
As of match played 10 April 2025

Club	Division	Season	League		National cup		Continental		Total	
Club	Division	Season	Apps	Goals	Apps	Goals	Apps	Goals	Apps	Goals
Universitario	Torneo Descentralizado	2016	2	0	-		-		2	0
Alianza Lima	Torneo Descentralizado	2017	32	5	-		1	0	33	5
Alianza Lima	Torneo Descentralizado	2018	38	4	-		5	0	43	4
Alianza Lima	Torneo Descentralizado	2019	31	17	-		6	0	37	17
Goiás	Série A	2020	1	0	1	0	-		2	0
Melgar	Liga 1	2021	16	3	-		2	0	18	3
Melgar	Liga 1	2022	27	4	-		10	0	37	4
Melgar	Total		43	7	0	0	12	0	55	7
Deportivo Garcilaso	Liga 1	2023	31	8	-		-		31	8
Universidad Católica	Ecuadorian Serie A	2024	14	2	0	0	7	0	21	2
Alianza Lima	Liga 1	2024	14	0	-		0	0	14	0
Alianza Lima	Liga 1	2025	17	4	-		12	5	124	96
Alianza Lima	Total		132	30	0	0	20	4	152	34
Career total			223	47	1	0	39	4	263	51

=== International ===
As of match played 12 November 2025

Appearances and goals by national team and year
National team	Year	Apps	Goals
Peru	2019	1	0
Peru	2025	6	0
Total		7	0
