= 2019 Copa Libertadores group stage =

The 2019 Copa Libertadores group stage was played from 5 March to 9 May 2019. A total of 32 teams competed in the group stage to decide the 16 places in the final stages of the 2019 Copa Libertadores.

== Draw ==
The draw for the group stage was held on 17 December 2018, 20:30 PYST (UTC−3), at the CONMEBOL Convention Centre in Luque, Paraguay.

Teams were seeded by their CONMEBOL ranking of the Copa Libertadores as of 15 December 2018 (shown in parentheses), taking into account the following three factors:

1. Performance in the last 10 years, taking into account Copa Libertadores results in the period 2009–2018
2. Historical coefficient, taking into account Copa Libertadores results in the period 1960–2008
3. Local tournament champion, with bonus points awarded to domestic league champions of the last 10 years

For the group stage, the 32 teams were drawn into eight groups (Groups A–H) of four containing a team from each of the four pots. Teams from the same association could not be drawn into the same group, excluding the four winners of the third stage, which were allocated to Pot 4 and whose identity was not known at the time of the draw, and could be drawn into the same group with another team from the same association.

Group stage draw
Pot 1	Pot 2	Pot 3	Pot 4
(Argentina) River Plate (1); (Argentina) Boca Juniors (2); (Brazil) Grêmio (3); (Uruguay) Nacional (5); (Uruguay) Peñarol (6); (Brazil) Palmeiras (7); (Brazil) Cruzeiro (9); (Paraguay) Olimpia (12)	(Brazil) Athletico Paranaense (53); (Argentina) San Lorenzo (14); (Paraguay) Cerro Porteño (15); (Ecuador) Emelec (16); (Brazil) Internacional (25); (Brazil) Flamengo (30); (Chile) Universidad Católica (33); (Peru) Sporting Cristal (34)	(Bolivia) Jorge Wilstermann (41); (Argentina) Rosario Central (43); (Ecuador) LDU Quito (46); (Colombia) Junior (51); (Peru) Alianza Lima (55); (Argentina) Huracán (59); (Argentina) Godoy Cruz (60); (Venezuela) Zamora (69)	(Venezuela) Deportivo Lara (72); (Colombia) Deportes Tolima (76); (Chile) Universidad de Concepción (152); (Bolivia) San José (83); Third stage winner G1; Third stage winner G2; Third stage winner G3; Third stage winner G4

Notes

1. ^{TH} The defending Copa Libertadores champions were automatically seeded in Pot 1 and allocated to Group A.
2. ^{CS} The defending Copa Sudamericana champions were automatically seeded in Pot 2.
3. ^{†} The identity of the team Bolivia 2 was not known at the time of the draw, and was seeded in Pot 4.

The following were the four winners of the third stage of qualifying which joined the 28 direct entrants in the group stage.

Match	Third stage winners
G1	(Brazil) Atlético Mineiro (10)
G2	(Peru) Melgar (80)
G3	(Paraguay) Libertad (23)
G4	(Chile) Palestino (84)

== Format ==
In the group stage, each group was played on a home-and-away round-robin basis. The teams were ranked according to the following criteria: 1. Points (3 points for a win, 1 point for a draw, and 0 points for a loss); 2. Goal difference; 3. Goals scored; 4. Away goals scored; 5. CONMEBOL ranking (Regulations Article 28).

The winners and runners-up of each group advanced to the round of 16 of the final stages. The third-placed teams of each group entered the Copa Sudamericana second stage.

== Schedule ==
The schedule of each matchday was as follows.

Matchday	Dates	Matches
Matchday 1	5–7 March 2019	Team 4 vs. Team 2, Team 3 vs. Team 1
Matchday 2	12–14 March 2019	Team 2 vs. Team 3, Team 1 vs. Team 4
Matchday 3	2–4 April 2019	Team 2 vs. Team 1, Team 4 vs. Team 3
Matchday 4	9–11 April 2019	Team 2 vs. Team 4, Team 1 vs. Team 3
Matchday 5	23–25 April 2019	Team 3 vs. Team 2, Team 4 vs. Team 1
Matchday 6	7–9 May 2019	Team 1 vs. Team 2, Team 3 vs. Team 4

Notes

1. ^{†} Matchday 3 was initially scheduled on 26–28 March 2019, but was rescheduled to 2–4 April 2019 by CONMEBOL due to the FIFA match dates of 18–26 March 2019.

== Groups ==
=== Group A ===
Pos	Team	Pld	W	D	L	GF	GA	GD	Pts	Qualification	INT	RIV	PAL	ALI
1	(Brazil) Internacional	6	4	2	0	11	6	+5	14	Round of 16	—	2–2	3–2	2–0
2	(Argentina) River Plate	6	2	4	0	10	5	+5	10	Round of 16	2–2	—	0–0	3–0
3	(Chile) Palestino	6	2	1	3	7	7	0	7	Copa Sudamericana	0–1	0–2	—	3–0
4	(Peru) Alianza Lima	6	0	1	5	2	12	−10	1		0–1	1–1	1–2	—

Source: CONMEBOL
6 March 2019
19:15 UTC−3

Palestino (Chile)	0–1	(Brazil) Internacional
	Report	Rafael Sóbis 82'

Estadio San Carlos de Apoquindo, Santiago (Note: Palestino played their home match against Internacional at Estadio San Carlos de Apoquindo, Santiago, instead of their regular stadium Estadio Municipal de La Cisterna, Santiago. They played their home matches against Alianza Lima and River Plate at Estadio Monumental David Arellano, Santiago.)
Referee: Mario Díaz de Vivar (Paraguay)
6 March 2019
19:30 UTC−5

Alianza Lima (Peru)	1–1	(Argentina) River Plate
Manzaneda 30'	Report	Ferreira 90+5'

Estadio Nacional, Lima (Note: Alianza Lima played their home matches against River Plate and Internacional at Estadio Nacional, Lima, instead of their regular stadium Estadio Alejandro Villanueva, Lima. They played their home match against Palestino at Estadio Alejandro Villanueva, Lima.)
Referee: Wilmar Roldán (Colombia)

13 March 2019
21:30 UTC−3

Internacional (Brazil)	2–0	(Peru) Alianza Lima
López 7', 19'	Report

Estádio Beira-Rio, Porto Alegre
Referee: Jesús Valenzuela (Venezuela)
13 March 2019
21:30 UTC−3

River Plate (Argentina)	0–0	(Chile) Palestino
	Report

Estadio Monumental Antonio Vespucio Liberti, Buenos Aires
Attendance: 0 (Note: River Plate played their home matches against Palestino and Alianza Lima behind closed doors as they were punished for the events that occurred before the second leg of the 2018 Copa Libertadores Finals.)
Referee: Alexis Herrera (Venezuela)

2 April 2019
21:30 UTC−3

Palestino (Chile)	3–0	(Peru) Alianza Lima
Duclós 35' (o.g.); Passerini 64'; Ahumada 77'	Report

Estadio Monumental David Arellano, Santiago
Referee: Éber Aquino (Paraguay)
3 April 2019
19:15 UTC−3

Internacional (Brazil)	2–2	(Argentina) River Plate
López 17'; Edenílson 30'	Report	Pratto 41' (pen.); De La Cruz 60'

Estádio Beira-Rio, Porto Alegre
Referee: Esteban Ostojich (Uruguay)

9 April 2019
21:30 UTC−3

Internacional (Brazil)	3–2	(Chile) Palestino
Patrick 10'; Guerrero 21', 65'	Report	Fernández 41'; Passerini 46'

Estádio Beira-Rio, Porto Alegre
Referee: Carlos Orbe (Ecuador)
11 April 2019
19:00 UTC−3

River Plate (Argentina)	3–0	(Peru) Alianza Lima
Suárez 14'; Martínez Quarta 53'; De La Cruz 90+2'	Report

Estadio Monumental Antonio Vespucio Liberti, Buenos Aires
Attendance: 0
Referee: Mario Díaz de Vivar (Paraguay)

24 April 2019
18:15 UTC−4

Palestino (Chile)	0–2	(Argentina) River Plate
	Report	Pinola 30'; Fernández 62'

Estadio Monumental David Arellano, Santiago
Referee: Andrés Rojas (Colombia)
24 April 2019
19:30 UTC−5

Alianza Lima (Peru)	0–1	(Brazil) Internacional
	Report	Rodrigo Moledo 80'

Estadio Nacional, Lima
Referee: Raúl Orosco (Bolivia)

7 May 2019
21:30 UTC−3

River Plate (Argentina)	2–2	(Brazil) Internacional
Álvarez 34'; Pratto 90+3'	Report	Rafael Sóbis 43', 58' (pen.)

Estadio Monumental Antonio Vespucio Liberti, Buenos Aires
Referee: Piero Maza (Chile)
7 May 2019
19:30 UTC−5

Alianza Lima (Peru)	1–2	(Chile) Palestino
I. González 18' (o.g.)	Report	Tarifeño 36', 53'

Estadio Alejandro Villanueva, Lima
Referee: Guillermo Guerrero (Ecuador)

=== Group B ===
Pos	Team	Pld	W	D	L	GF	GA	GD	Pts	Qualification	CRU	EME	LAR	HUR
1	(Brazil) Cruzeiro	6	5	0	1	11	2	+9	15	Round of 16	—	1–2	2–0	4–0
2	(Ecuador) Emelec	6	2	3	1	6	5	+1	9	Round of 16	0–1	—	2–2	0–0
3	(Venezuela) Deportivo Lara	6	1	2	3	4	10	−6	5	Copa Sudamericana	0–2	0–0	—	2–1
4	(Argentina) Huracán	6	1	1	4	5	9	−4	4		0–1	1–2	3–0	—

Source: CONMEBOL
7 March 2019
19:00 UTC−3

Huracán (Argentina)	0–1	(Brazil) Cruzeiro
	Report	Rodriguinho 29'

Estadio Tomás Adolfo Ducó, Buenos Aires
Referee: Diego Haro (Peru)
8 March 2019 (Note: The Deportivo Lara v Emelec match was originally scheduled on 7 March 2019, 22:00 local time but was suspended due to a nationwide power outage in Venezuela. It was rescheduled to 8 March 2019, 15:00 local time.)
15:00 UTC−4

Deportivo Lara (Venezuela)	0–0	(Ecuador) Emelec
	Report

Estadio Metropolitano de Cabudare, Cabudare
Attendance: 0 (Note: Deportivo Lara played all their group stage home matches behind closed doors as they were punished for crowd disturbances at their 2018 Copa Libertadores group stage match against Corinthians.)
Referee: Gery Vargas (Bolivia)

14 March 2019
21:00 UTC−5

Emelec (Ecuador)	0–0	(Argentina) Huracán
	Report

Estadio George Capwell, Guayaquil
Referee: Éber Aquino (Paraguay)
27 March 2019 (Note: The Cruzeiro v Deportivo Lara match was originally scheduled on 13 March 2019, 19:15 local time but was first rescheduled to 14 March 2019, 19:15 local time, and later to 27 March 2019, 21:30 local time.)
21:30 UTC−3

Cruzeiro (Brazil)	2–0	(Venezuela) Deportivo Lara
Rodriguinho 6'; Jadson 90+4'	Report

Estádio Mineirão, Belo Horizonte
Referee: Piero Maza (Chile)

3 April 2019
19:30 UTC−5

Emelec (Ecuador)	0–1	(Brazil) Cruzeiro
	Report	Rodriguinho 32'

Estadio George Capwell, Guayaquil
Referee: Víctor Carrillo (Peru)
3 April 2019
20:30 UTC−4

Deportivo Lara (Venezuela)	2–1	(Argentina) Huracán
Manzano 8' (pen.); Centeno 43'	Report	Manzano 62' (o.g.)

Estadio Metropolitano de Cabudare, Cabudare
Attendance: 0
Referee: Leodán González (Uruguay)

10 April 2019 (Note: The Cruzeiro v Huracán match was originally scheduled on 9 April 2019, 19:15 local time but was rescheduled to 10 April 2019, 19:15 local time.)
19:15 UTC−3

Cruzeiro (Brazil)	4–0	(Argentina) Huracán
Fred 18', 22', 31'; Dodô 82'	Report

Estádio Mineirão, Belo Horizonte
Referee: Julio Bascuñán (Chile)
11 April 2019
21:00 UTC−5

Emelec (Ecuador)	2–2	(Venezuela) Deportivo Lara
B. Angulo 66', 73'	Report	Frutos 50' (pen.); F. Vargas 88'

Estadio George Capwell, Guayaquil
Referee: Esteban Ostojich (Uruguay)

23 April 2019
16:00 UTC−4 (Note: The Deportivo Lara v Cruzeiro match was originally scheduled on 23 April 2019, 20:30 local time but was rescheduled to 16:00 local time.)

Deportivo Lara (Venezuela)	0–2	(Brazil) Cruzeiro
	Report	Fred 30'; Sassá 77' (pen.)

Estadio Metropolitano de Cabudare, Cabudare
Attendance: 0
Referee: Gery Vargas (Bolivia)
23 April 2019
19:15 UTC−3

Huracán (Argentina)	1–2	(Ecuador) Emelec
Gamba 90+5'	Report	Jaime 34'; B. Angulo 71'

Estadio Tomás Adolfo Ducó, Buenos Aires
Referee: Arnaldo Samaniego (Paraguay)

8 May 2019
19:15 UTC−3

Cruzeiro (Brazil)	1–2	(Ecuador) Emelec
Sassá 66'	Report	Fábio 41' (o.g.); B. Angulo 89' (pen.)

Estádio Mineirão, Belo Horizonte
Referee: Andrés Rojas (Colombia)
8 May 2019
19:15 UTC−3

Huracán (Argentina)	3–0	(Venezuela) Deportivo Lara
Gamba 23'; Chávez 28', 64'	Report

Estadio Tomás Adolfo Ducó, Buenos Aires
Referee: Víctor Carrillo (Peru)

=== Group C ===
Pos	Team	Pld	W	D	L	GF	GA	GD	Pts	Qualification	OLI	GOD	CRI	UDC
1	(Paraguay) Olimpia	6	2	3	1	9	6	+3	9	Round of 16	—	2–1	0–1	1–1
2	(Argentina) Godoy Cruz	6	2	3	1	5	3	+2	9	Round of 16	0–0	—	2–0	1–0
3	(Peru) Sporting Cristal	6	2	1	3	8	11	−3	7	Copa Sudamericana	0–3	1–1	—	2–0
4	(Chile) Universidad de Concepción	6	1	3	2	9	11	−2	6		3–3	0–0	5–4	—

Source: CONMEBOL
5 March 2019
19:15 UTC−3

Godoy Cruz (Argentina)	0–0	(Paraguay) Olimpia
	Report

Estadio Malvinas Argentinas, Mendoza
Referee: Raphael Claus (Brazil)
6 March 2019
19:15 UTC−3

Universidad de Concepción (Chile)	5–4	(Peru) Sporting Cristal
Rubio 45+1', 50', 80', 90+2'; Orellana 71'	Report	Gonzáles 55'; Palacios 58', 86'; Herrera 85'

Estadio Ester Roa, Concepción
Referee: Nicolás Gallo (Colombia)

12 March 2019
19:15 UTC−3

Olimpia (Paraguay)	1–1	(Chile) Universidad de Concepción
Viudez 15'	Report	Orellana 28'

Estadio Defensores del Chaco, Asunción (Note: Olimpia played their home matches against Universidad de Concepción and Godoy Cruz at Estadio Defensores del Chaco, Asunción, instead of their regular stadium Estadio Manuel Ferreira, Asunción. They played their home match against Sporting Cristal at Estadio Manuel Ferreira, Asunción.)
Referee: Wilton Sampaio (Brazil)
12 March 2019
19:30 UTC−5

Sporting Cristal (Peru)	1–1	(Argentina) Godoy Cruz
Herrera 2'	Report	Cardona 14'

Estadio Nacional, Lima (Note: Sporting Cristal played their home matches at Estadio Nacional, Lima, instead of their regular stadium Estadio Alberto Gallardo, Lima.)
Referee: Anderson Daronco (Brazil)

3 April 2019
19:15 UTC−3

Universidad de Concepción (Chile)	0–0	(Argentina) Godoy Cruz
	Report

Estadio Ester Roa, Concepción
Referee: Bráulio Machado (Brazil)
4 April 2019
21:00 UTC−5

Sporting Cristal (Peru)	0–3	(Paraguay) Olimpia
	Report	Santa Cruz 52'; Mendieta 54'; Rojas 79'

Estadio Nacional, Lima
Referee: Andrés Rojas (Colombia)

9 April 2019
18:15 UTC−4

Olimpia (Paraguay)	2–1	(Argentina) Godoy Cruz
Camacho 19', 45+3'	Report	García 90+3'

Estadio Defensores del Chaco, Asunción
Referee: Anderson Daronco (Brazil)
10 April 2019
17:15 UTC−5

Sporting Cristal (Peru)	2–0	(Chile) Universidad de Concepción
Palacios 30'; Merlo 33'	Report

Estadio Nacional, Lima
Referee: Leodán González (Uruguay)

23 April 2019
18:15 UTC−4

Universidad de Concepción (Chile)	3–3	(Paraguay) Olimpia
Cordero 8' (pen.); Rubio 39'; Ballón 73'	Report	Santa Cruz 54'; Camacho 63'; Ortiz 90+1'

Estadio Ester Roa, Concepción
Referee: Wilmar Roldán (Colombia)
23 April 2019
21:30 UTC−3

Godoy Cruz (Argentina)	2–0	(Peru) Sporting Cristal
Viera 45+1' (pen.); Lucero 47'	Report

Estadio Malvinas Argentinas, Mendoza
Referee: Jesús Valenzuela (Venezuela)

9 May 2019
18:15 UTC−4

Olimpia (Paraguay)	0–1	(Peru) Sporting Cristal
	Report	Palacios 44'

Estadio Manuel Ferreira, Asunción
Referee: Raphael Claus (Brazil)
9 May 2019
19:15 UTC−3

Godoy Cruz (Argentina)	1–0	(Chile) Universidad de Concepción
González 24'	Report

Estadio Malvinas Argentinas, Mendoza
Referee: Wilton Sampaio (Brazil)

=== Group D ===
Pos	Team	Pld	W	D	L	GF	GA	GD	Pts	Qualification	FLA	LDQ	PEÑ	SJO
1	(Brazil) Flamengo	6	3	1	2	11	5	+6	10	Round of 16	—	3–1	0–1	6–1
2	(Ecuador) LDU Quito	6	3	1	2	12	8	+4	10	Round of 16	2–1	—	2–0	4–0
3	(Uruguay) Peñarol	6	3	1	2	7	5	+2	10	Copa Sudamericana	0–0	1–0	—	4–0
4	(Bolivia) San José	6	1	1	4	7	19	−12	4		0–1	3–3	3–1	—

Source: CONMEBOL
5 March 2019
18:15 UTC−4

San José (Bolivia)	0–1	(Brazil) Flamengo
	Report	Gabriel Barbosa 59'

Estadio Jesús Bermúdez, Oruro
Referee: Néstor Pitana (Argentina)
7 March 2019
19:00 UTC−5

LDU Quito (Ecuador)	2–0	(Uruguay) Peñarol
Freire 25'; Aguirre 81'	Report

Estadio Rodrigo Paz Delgado, Quito
Referee: Fernando Rapallini (Argentina)

13 March 2019
21:30 UTC−3

Flamengo (Brazil)	3–1	(Ecuador) LDU Quito
Éverton Ribeiro 8'; Gabriel Barbosa 68'; Uribe 80'	Report	Martínez Borja 90+1' (pen.)

Estádio do Maracanã, Rio de Janeiro
Referee: Germán Delfino (Argentina)
14 March 2019
19:00 UTC−3

Peñarol (Uruguay)	4–0	(Bolivia) San José
Viatri 2', 48'; Lema 22'; Canobbio 36'	Report

Estadio Campeón del Siglo, Montevideo
Referee: José Argote (Venezuela)

2 April 2019
18:15 UTC−4

San José (Bolivia)	3–3	(Ecuador) LDU Quito
Saucedo 29'; Cruz 70' (o.g.); Ramallo 76'	Report	Anangonó 24'; Mena 39' (o.g.), 68' (o.g.)

Estadio Jesús Bermúdez, Oruro
Referee: Arnaldo Samaniego (Paraguay)
3 April 2019
21:30 UTC−3

Flamengo (Brazil)	0–1	(Uruguay) Peñarol
	Report	Viatri 87'

Estádio do Maracanã, Rio de Janeiro
Referee: Patricio Loustau (Argentina)

9 April 2019
21:30 UTC−3

Peñarol (Uruguay)	1–0	(Ecuador) LDU Quito
C. Rodríguez 69'	Report

Estadio Campeón del Siglo, Montevideo
Referee: Alexis Herrera (Venezuela)
11 April 2019
21:00 UTC−3

Flamengo (Brazil)	6–1	(Bolivia) San José
Diego 2'; Éverton Ribeiro 30', 79'; De Arrascaeta 56'; Vitinho 83' (pen.); Gutiérrez 88' (o.g.)	Report	Saucedo 18'

Estádio do Maracanã, Rio de Janeiro
Referee: Piero Maza (Chile)

24 April 2019
19:30 UTC−5

LDU Quito (Ecuador)	2–1	(Brazil) Flamengo
Anangonó 45+2'; Chicaiza 72'	Report	Bruno Henrique 18'

Estadio Rodrigo Paz Delgado, Quito
Referee: Néstor Pitana (Argentina)
24 April 2019
20:30 UTC−4

San José (Bolivia)	3–1	(Uruguay) Peñarol
Mena 55'; Saucedo 72' (pen.); Sanguinetti 87'	Report	Mena 82' (o.g.)

Estadio Jesús Bermúdez, Oruro
Referee: Germán Delfino (Argentina)

8 May 2019
21:30 UTC−3

Peñarol (Uruguay)	0–0	(Brazil) Flamengo
	Report

Estadio Campeón del Siglo, Montevideo
Referee: Roberto Tobar (Chile)
8 May 2019
19:30 UTC−5

LDU Quito (Ecuador)	4–0	(Bolivia) San José
Martínez Borja 64'; A. Julio 67', 73', 87'	Report

Estadio Rodrigo Paz Delgado, Quito
Referee: José Argote (Venezuela)

=== Group E ===
Pos	Team	Pld	W	D	L	GF	GA	GD	Pts	Qualification	CPO	NAC	CAM	ZAM
1	(Paraguay) Cerro Porteño	6	4	1	1	10	5	+5	13	Round of 16	—	1–0	4–1	2–1
2	(Uruguay) Nacional	6	4	1	1	5	2	+3	13	Round of 16	1–1	—	1–0	1–0
3	(Brazil) Atlético Mineiro	6	2	0	4	6	10	−4	6	Copa Sudamericana	0–1	0–1	—	3–2
4	(Venezuela) Zamora	6	1	0	5	6	10	−4	3		2–1	0–1	1–2	—

Source: CONMEBOL
6 March 2019
19:15 UTC−3

Atlético Mineiro (Brazil)	0–1	(Paraguay) Cerro Porteño
	Report	Churín 77'

Estádio Mineirão, Belo Horizonte (Note: Atlético Mineiro played their home matches at Estádio Mineirão, Belo Horizonte, instead of their regular stadium Estádio Independência, Belo Horizonte.)
Referee: Mauro Vigliano (Argentina)
6 March 2019
20:30 UTC−4

Zamora (Venezuela)	0–1	(Uruguay) Nacional
	Report	Bergessio 23'

Estadio Agustín Tovar, Barinas
Referee: Víctor Carrillo (Peru)

12 March 2019
21:30 UTC−3

Nacional (Uruguay)	1–0	(Brazil) Atlético Mineiro
Bergessio 71'	Report

Estadio Gran Parque Central, Montevideo
Referee: Roberto Tobar (Chile)
13 March 2019
19:15 UTC−3

Cerro Porteño (Paraguay)	2–1	(Venezuela) Zamora
Haedo Valdez 19', 48'	Report	Paiva 52'

Estadio General Pablo Rojas, Asunción
Referee: Facundo Tello (Argentina)

2 April 2019
18:15 UTC−4

Cerro Porteño (Paraguay)	1–0	(Uruguay) Nacional
Cáceres 26'	Report

Estadio General Pablo Rojas, Asunción
Referee: Néstor Pitana (Argentina)
3 April 2019
19:15 UTC−3

Atlético Mineiro (Brazil)	3–2	(Venezuela) Zamora
Maicon Bolt 50'; Vinícius Goes 71'; Fábio Santos 79' (pen.)	Report	Gallardo 16'; Paiva 44'

Estádio Mineirão, Belo Horizonte
Referee: Gery Vargas (Bolivia)

10 April 2019
18:15 UTC−4

Cerro Porteño (Paraguay)	4–1	(Brazil) Atlético Mineiro
Acosta 30'; Carrizo 33'; Cáceres 36'; Larrivey 43'	Report	Ricardo Oliveira 18'

Estadio General Pablo Rojas, Asunción
Referee: Wilmar Roldán (Colombia)
10 April 2019
19:15 UTC−3

Nacional (Uruguay)	1–0	(Venezuela) Zamora
Bergessio 50'	Report

Estadio Gran Parque Central, Montevideo
Referee: Fernando Espinoza (Argentina)

23 April 2019
21:30 UTC−3

Atlético Mineiro (Brazil)	0–1	(Uruguay) Nacional
	Report	Carballo 86'

Estádio Mineirão, Belo Horizonte
Referee: Fernando Rapallini (Argentina)
25 April 2019
16:00 UTC−4 (Note: The Zamora v Cerro Porteño match was originally scheduled for 25 April 2019, 18:00 local time, but was re-scheduled to 16:00 local time.)

Zamora (Venezuela)	2–1	(Paraguay) Cerro Porteño
I. González 45' (pen.); Ramírez 50'	Report	Haedo Valdez 57'

Estadio Agustín Tovar, Barinas
Referee: Guillermo Guerrero (Ecuador)

7 May 2019
19:15 UTC−3

Nacional (Uruguay)	1–1	(Paraguay) Cerro Porteño
Amaral 58'	Report	Arzamendia 45+1'

Estadio Gran Parque Central, Montevideo
Referee: Alexis Herrera (Venezuela)
7 May 2019
18:15 UTC−4

Zamora (Venezuela)	1–2	(Brazil) Atlético Mineiro
I. González 58' (pen.)	Report	Alerrandro 24', 35'

Estadio Agustín Tovar, Barinas
Referee: Carlos Herrera (Colombia)

=== Group F ===
Pos	Team	Pld	W	D	L	GF	GA	GD	Pts	Qualification	PAL	SLO	MEL	JUN
1	(Brazil) Palmeiras	6	5	0	1	13	1	+12	15	Round of 16	—	1–0	3–0	3–0
2	(Argentina) San Lorenzo	6	3	1	2	4	2	+2	10	Round of 16	1–0	—	2–0	1–0
3	(Peru) Melgar	6	2	1	3	2	9	−7	7	Copa Sudamericana	0–4	0–0	—	1–0
4	(Colombia) Junior	6	1	0	5	1	8	−7	3		0–2	1–0	0–1	—

Source: CONMEBOL
5 March 2019
17:15 UTC−5

Melgar (Peru)	0–0	(Argentina) San Lorenzo
	Report

Estadio Monumental de la UNSA, Arequipa
Referee: Alexis Herrera (Venezuela)
6 March 2019
19:30 UTC−5

Junior (Colombia)	0–2	(Brazil) Palmeiras
	Report	Scarpa 10'; Rocha 90+1'

Estadio Metropolitano Roberto Meléndez, Barranquilla
Attendance: 26,544
Referee: Daniel Fedorczuk (Uruguay)

12 March 2019
19:15 UTC−3

Palmeiras (Brazil)	3–0	(Peru) Melgar
Felipe Melo 24'; Goulart 53'; Deyverson 70'	Report

Allianz Parque, São Paulo
Referee: Mario Díaz de Vivar (Paraguay)
13 March 2019
19:15 UTC−3

San Lorenzo (Argentina)	1–0	(Colombia) Junior
Martínez 77'	Report

Estadio Pedro Bidegain, Buenos Aires
Referee: Arnaldo Samaniego (Paraguay)

2 April 2019
19:15 UTC−3

San Lorenzo (Argentina)	1–0	(Brazil) Palmeiras
Herrera 50'	Report

Estadio Pedro Bidegain, Buenos Aires
Referee: Julio Bascuñán (Chile)
2 April 2019
19:30 UTC−5

Melgar (Peru)	1–0	(Colombia) Junior
Carmona 71'	Report

Estadio Monumental de la UNSA, Arequipa
Referee: Jesús Valenzuela (Venezuela)

9 April 2019
21:30 UTC−3

San Lorenzo (Argentina)	2–0	(Peru) Melgar
Rodríguez 45'; Barrios 87'	Report

Estadio Pedro Bidegain, Buenos Aires
Referee: Éber Aquino (Paraguay)
10 April 2019
21:30 UTC−3

Palmeiras (Brazil)	3–0	(Colombia) Junior
Deyverson 19'; Dudu 54'; Hyoran 88'	Report

Allianz Parque, São Paulo
Attendance: 28,791
Referee: Roberto Tobar (Chile)

25 April 2019
19:00 UTC−5

Junior (Colombia)	1–0	(Argentina) San Lorenzo
Rangel 12'	Report

Estadio Metropolitano Roberto Meléndez, Barranquilla
Referee: Leodán González (Uruguay)
25 April 2019
21:00 UTC−5

Melgar (Peru)	0–4	(Brazil) Palmeiras
	Report	Gómez 8'; Scarpa 21', 67'; Moisés 80'

Estadio Monumental de la UNSA, Arequipa
Referee: Carlos Orbe (Ecuador)

8 May 2019
21:30 UTC−3

Palmeiras (Brazil)	1–0	(Argentina) San Lorenzo
Scarpa 69'	Report

Allianz Parque, São Paulo
Referee: Gery Vargas (Bolivia)
8 May 2019
19:30 UTC−5

Junior (Colombia)	0–1	(Peru) Melgar
	Report	Cuesta 16'

Estadio Metropolitano Roberto Meléndez, Barranquilla
Referee: Darío Herrera (Argentina)

=== Group G ===
Pos	Team	Pld	W	D	L	GF	GA	GD	Pts	Qualification	BOC	CAP	TOL	WIL
1	(Argentina) Boca Juniors	6	3	2	1	11	6	+5	11	Round of 16	—	2–1	3–0	4–0
2	(Brazil) Athletico Paranaense	6	3	0	3	11	6	+5	9	Round of 16	3–0	—	1–0	4–0
3	(Colombia) Deportes Tolima	6	2	2	2	7	8	−1	8	Copa Sudamericana	2–2	1–0	—	2–2
4	(Bolivia) Jorge Wilstermann	6	1	2	3	5	14	−9	5		0–0	3–2	0–2	—

Source: CONMEBOL
5 March 2019
19:30 UTC−5

Deportes Tolima (Colombia)	1–0	(Brazil) Athletico Paranaense
Banguero 29'	Report

Estadio Manuel Murillo Toro, Ibagué
Referee: Piero Maza (Chile)
5 March 2019
20:30 UTC−4

Jorge Wilstermann (Bolivia)	0–0	(Argentina) Boca Juniors
	Report

Estadio Félix Capriles, Cochabamba
Referee: Julio Bascuñán (Chile)

12 March 2019
19:15 UTC−3

Boca Juniors (Argentina)	3–0	(Colombia) Deportes Tolima
Pérez 47' (o.g.); Benedetto 55'; Zárate 59'	Report

Estadio Alberto J. Armando, Buenos Aires
Referee: Esteban Ostojich (Uruguay)
14 March 2019
21:00 UTC−3

Athletico Paranaense (Brazil)	4–0	(Bolivia) Jorge Wilstermann
Ruben 32'; Andrade 36'; Renan Lodi 49'; Bruno Guimarães 87'	Report

Arena da Baixada, Curitiba
Referee: Carlos Orbe (Ecuador)

2 April 2019
21:30 UTC−3

Athletico Paranaense (Brazil)	3–0	(Argentina) Boca Juniors
Ruben 35', 68', 80'	Report

Arena da Baixada, Curitiba
Attendance: 33,658
Referee: Roberto Tobar (Chile)
3 April 2019
19:30 UTC−5

Deportes Tolima (Colombia)	2–2	(Bolivia) Jorge Wilstermann
Pérez 5', 59'	Report	Pedriel 74', 80'

Estadio Manuel Murillo Toro, Ibagué
Referee: Alexis Herrera (Venezuela)

9 April 2019
19:15 UTC−3

Athletico Paranaense (Brazil)	1–0	(Colombia) Deportes Tolima
Bruno Guimarães 78'	Report

Arena da Baixada, Curitiba
Referee: Jesús Valenzuela (Venezuela)
10 April 2019
21:30 UTC−3

Boca Juniors (Argentina)	4–0	(Bolivia) Jorge Wilstermann
Reynoso 35'; Benedetto 62' (pen.); Zárate 84', 90+4'	Report

Estadio Alberto J. Armando, Buenos Aires
Referee: Diego Haro (Peru)

24 April 2019
18:15 UTC−4

Jorge Wilstermann (Bolivia)	3–2	(Brazil) Athletico Paranaense
Pedriel 22'; Ortiz 50' (pen.); C. Melgar 87' (pen.)	Report	Renan Lodi 40'; Ruben 56' (pen.)

Estadio Félix Capriles, Cochabamba
Referee: Mario Díaz de Vivar (Paraguay)
24 April 2019
19:30 UTC−5

Deportes Tolima (Colombia)	2–2	(Argentina) Boca Juniors
Castro 12'; Pérez 20'	Report	Zárate 34'; Benedetto 43' (pen.)

Estadio Manuel Murillo Toro, Ibagué
Referee: Víctor Carrillo (Peru)

9 May 2019
21:30 UTC−3

Boca Juniors (Argentina)	2–1	(Brazil) Athletico Paranaense
López 71'; Tevez 90+4'	Report	Ruben 65'

Estadio Alberto J. Armando, Buenos Aires
Referee: Carlos Orbe (Ecuador)
9 May 2019
20:30 UTC−4

Jorge Wilstermann (Bolivia)	0–2	(Colombia) Deportes Tolima
	Report	Pérez 17'; Castro 61'

Estadio Félix Capriles, Cochabamba
Referee: Arnaldo Samaniego (Paraguay)

=== Group H ===
Pos	Team	Pld	W	D	L	GF	GA	GD	Pts	Qualification	LIB	GRE	UCA	ROS
1	(Paraguay) Libertad	6	4	0	2	11	7	+4	12	Round of 16	—	0–2	4–1	2–0
2	(Brazil) Grêmio	6	3	1	2	8	4	+4	10	Round of 16	0–1	—	2–0	3–1
3	(Chile) Universidad Católica	6	2	1	3	7	11	−4	7	Copa Sudamericana	2–3	1–0	—	2–1
4	(Argentina) Rosario Central	6	1	2	3	6	10	−4	5		2–1	1–1	1–1	—

Source: CONMEBOL
5 March 2019
21:30 UTC−3

Libertad (Paraguay)	4–1	(Chile) Universidad Católica
Martínez 1', 3'; Bareiro 73'; Cougo 90+3'	Report	Aued 37' (pen.)

Estadio Defensores del Chaco, Asunción (Note: Libertad played their home matches at Estadio Defensores del Chaco, Asunción, instead of their regular stadium Estadio Dr. Nicolás Léoz, Asunción.)
Referee: Jesús Valenzuela (Venezuela)
6 March 2019
21:30 UTC−3

Rosario Central (Argentina)	1–1	(Brazil) Grêmio
Zampedri 2'	Report	Everton 12'

Estadio Gigante de Arroyito, Rosario
Referee: Roddy Zambrano (Ecuador)

12 March 2019
21:30 UTC−3

Grêmio (Brazil)	0–1	(Paraguay) Libertad
	Report	Bareiro 45+2'

Arena do Grêmio, Porto Alegre
Referee: Diego Haro (Peru)
13 March 2019
21:30 UTC−3

Universidad Católica (Chile)	2–1	(Argentina) Rosario Central
Puch 27'; Aued 90+5' (pen.)	Report	Vergara 90+1'

Estadio San Carlos de Apoquindo, Santiago
Referee: Víctor Carrillo (Peru)

4 April 2019
19:00 UTC−3

Universidad Católica (Chile)	1–0	(Brazil) Grêmio
Sáez 16'	Report

Estadio San Carlos de Apoquindo, Santiago
Referee: Wilmar Roldán (Colombia)
4 April 2019
20:00 UTC−4

Libertad (Paraguay)	2–0	(Argentina) Rosario Central
Espinoza 46'; Recalde 68'	Report

Estadio Defensores del Chaco, Asunción
Referee: Carlos Orbe (Ecuador)

10 April 2019
20:30 UTC−4

Universidad Católica (Chile)	2–3	(Paraguay) Libertad
Puch 7'; Sáez 90+4'	Report	Recalde 43'; Cardozo 45'; Cardozo Lucena 83'

Estadio San Carlos de Apoquindo, Santiago
Referee: Gery Vargas (Bolivia)
10 April 2019
21:30 UTC−3

Grêmio (Brazil)	3–1	(Argentina) Rosario Central
Jean Pyerre 30'; Léo Gomes 54', 82'	Report	Aguirre 87'

Arena do Grêmio, Porto Alegre
Referee: Andrés Rojas (Colombia)

23 April 2019
18:15 UTC−4

Libertad (Paraguay)	0–2	(Brazil) Grêmio
	Report	Everton 28', 83'

Estadio Defensores del Chaco, Asunción
Referee: Alexis Herrera (Venezuela)
24 April 2019
19:15 UTC−3

Rosario Central (Argentina)	1–1	(Chile) Universidad Católica
Fuenzalida 79' (o.g.)	Report	Fuentes 23'

Estadio Gigante de Arroyito, Rosario
Referee: Esteban Ostojich (Uruguay)

8 May 2019
19:15 UTC−3

Grêmio (Brazil)	2–0	(Chile) Universidad Católica
Alisson 22'; Thaciano 76'	Report

Arena do Grêmio, Porto Alegre
Referee: Néstor Pitana (Argentina)
8 May 2019
19:15 UTC−3

Rosario Central (Argentina)	2–1	(Paraguay) Libertad
Pereyra 19'; Riaño 70'	Report	Cardozo 49' (pen.)

Estadio Gigante de Arroyito, Rosario
Referee: Ángel Arteaga (Venezuela)
