= 2019 Cruzeiro EC season =

Cruzeiro
2019 season
- President: Wagner Pires de Sá (until 20 December); José Dalai Rocha (interim – from 20 December)
- Manager: Mano Menezes (until 7 August); Rogério Ceni (11 August to 26 September); Abel Braga (27 September to 29 November); Adílson Batista (from 29 November)
- Stadium: Mineirão
- Série A: 17th (relegated)
- Campeonato Mineiro: Winners
- Copa do Brasil: Semi-finals
- Copa Libertadores: Round of 16
- Top goalscorer: League: Fred (5); Thiago Neves (5); All: Fred (21)
- Highest home attendance: 55,567 vs River Plate (30 July, Copa Libertadores)
- Lowest home attendance: 7,623 vs Caldense (20 March, Campeonato Mineiro)
- Average home league attendance: 27,395
- Biggest win: 5–0 vs Patrocinense (23 March, Campeonato Mineiro)
- Biggest defeat: 1–4 vs Fluminense (18 May, Série A); 1–4 vs Grêmio (8 September, Série A); 1–4 vs Santos (23 November, Série A)
Home colours	Away colours	Third colours

The 2019 season was the 98th in the Cruzeiro Esporte Clube's existence. Along with the Campeonato Brasileiro Série A, the club also competed in the Campeonato Mineiro, the Copa do Brasil and the Copa Libertadores.

After a strong start to the season – which included a 21-game unbeaten streak, a solid performance in the Copa Libertadores group stage and a Campeonato Mineiro title over city rivals Atlético Mineiro –, Cruzeiro were largely appointed as major contenders for the 2019 national and international competitions titles. However, the team had a sharp drop in yeld from May, causing them to fight against relegation since the early rounds of the Campeonato Brasileiro Série A.

On 26 May, corruption and mismanagement scandals involving the Cruzeiro's board were revealed by the Rede Globo program Fantástico, causing huge repercussions inside and outside the club. Police investigations, financial difficulties and political unstability would be a constant throughout the year at Cruzeiro, leading to a devastating crisis that ended up affecting the team's performance on the pitch.

On 30 July, Cruzeiro were knocked out of Copa Libertadores on penalties to River Plate in the round of 16 stage, after a 0–0 tie on aggregate.

On 7 August, following a run of bad results – having the team won just 1 of 18 matches –, Cruzeiro announced the departure of manager Mano Menezes, ending a more than three years spell in the club. Four days later, Rogério Ceni was announced as the new team's manager.

On 4 September, the club were eliminated by Internacional in the Copa do Brasil semi-finals, losing 4–0 on aggregate.

Rogério Ceni was sacked on 26 September, after just 8 games in charge. Disagreements with squad members and lack of support from the club board were cited as the main causes for dismissal. On 27 September, Abel Braga was appointed as the new team's manager.

Incapable of improving the team's performance, Abel Braga left Cruzeiro on 29 November, having achieved only 3 wins in 14 games. On the same day, Adilson Batista was announced as the manager for the last three rounds of the championship, taking the team in 17th position in the table.

In financial, technical and political collapse, Cruzeiro were relegated to Campeonato Brasileiro Série B for the first time in their history on 8 December, after a 2–0 loss to Palmeiras at Mineirão.

== Competitions ==
=== Overview ===
Competition	First match	Last match	Starting round	Final position	Record							
Competition	First match	Last match	Starting round	Final position	Pld	W	D	L	GF	GA	GD	Win %
Campeonato Mineiro	19 January	20 April	Matchday 1	Winners	16	11	5	0	36	9	+27	68.75
Campeonato Brasileiro Série A	27 April	8 December	Round 1	17th	38	7	15	16	27	46	−19	18.42
Copa do Brasil	15 May	4 September	Round of 16	Semi-finals	6	1	2	3	6	9	−3	16.67
Copa Libertadores	7 March	30 July	Group stage	Round of 16	8	5	2	1	11	2	+9	62.50
Total					68	24	24	20	80	66	+14	35.29

Source: Competitions

=== Campeonato Mineiro ===
==== First stage ====
Pos	Team	Pld	W	D	L	GF	GA	GD	Pts	Qualification or relegation
1	Atlético Mineiro	11	9	1	1	24	6	+18	28	Knockout stage
2	Cruzeiro	11	7	4	0	22	5	+17	25	Knockout stage
3	América Mineiro	11	6	4	1	22	9	+13	22	Knockout stage
4	Boa Esporte	11	5	3	3	21	16	+5	18	Knockout stage and 2020 Série D
5	Tombense	11	3	4	4	11	11	0	13	Knockout stage and 2020 Série D

Updated to match(es) played on 20 March 2019. Source:
Rules for classification: 1) Points; 2) Wins; 3) Goal difference; 4) Goals scored; 5) Head-to-head results; 6) Fewest red cards received; 7) Fewest yellow cards received; 8) Draw.

19 January 1	Guarani	1–3	Cruzeiro	Divinópolis
16:30 UTC−3	Alemão 43'	Report	Raniel 14'; Robinho 19', 46'	Stadium: Farião; Attendance: 4,190; Referee: Felipe Fernandes de Lima

23 January 2	Cruzeiro	1–0	Patrocinense	Belo Horizonte
19:15 UTC−3	David 43'	Report		Stadium: Mineirão; Attendance: 15,141; Referee: Michel Patrick Costa Guimarães

27 January 3	Cruzeiro	1–1	Atlético Mineiro	Belo Horizonte
11:00 UTC−3	Fred 59' (pen.)	Report	Fábio Santos 82' (pen.)	Stadium: Mineirão; Attendance: 43,354; Referee: Wanderson Alves de Souza

31 January 4	Boa Esporte	2–2	Cruzeiro	Varginha
20:00 UTC−3	Gustavo Henrique 55'; Gabriel Vieira 75'	Report	Robinho 28'; Fred 63'	Stadium: Melão; Attendance: 4,272; Referee: Ronei Cândido Alves

3 February 5	Villa Nova	0–3	Cruzeiro	Nova Lima
17:00 UTC−3		Report	Fred 37'; Rafinha 45+2'; Raniel 80'	Stadium: Castor Cifuentes; Attendance: 2,481; Referee: Igor Júnio Benevenuto

10 February 6	Cruzeiro	3–0	Tupynambás	Belo Horizonte
17:00 UTC−3	Fred 14'; Rodriguinho 44'; Rafinha 60'	Report		Stadium: Mineirão; Attendance: 14,176; Referee: Gabriel Murta Barbosa Maciel

17 February 7	América Mineiro	0–0	Cruzeiro	Belo Horizonte
17:00 UTC−3		Report		Stadium: Independência; Attendance: 6,620; Referee: Ronei Cândido Alves

24 February 8	URT	1–1	Cruzeiro	Patos de Minas
19:00 UTC−3	Reis 45+2'	Report	Rodriguinho 31'	Stadium: Zama Maciel; Attendance: 5,140; Referee: Emerson de Almeida Ferreira

10 March 9	Cruzeiro	2–0	Tombense	Belo Horizonte
16:00 UTC−3	Sassá 17'; David 56'	Report		Stadium: Mineirão; Attendance: 11,756; Referee: Felipe Fernandes de Lima

16 March 10	Tupi	0–3	Cruzeiro	Juiz de Fora
16:00 UTC−3		Report	Aislan 2' (o.g.); Fred 20' (pen.); Egídio 84'	Stadium: Mário Heleno; Attendance: 4,330; Referee: Jeferson Antonio da Costa

20 March 11	Cruzeiro	3–0	Caldense	Belo Horizonte
21:30 UTC−3	David 9'; Marquinhos Gabriel 32'; Fred 39'	Report		Stadium: Mineirão; Attendance: 7,623; Referee: Marco Aurélio Augusto Fazekas Ferreira

==== Knockout phase ====
===== Quarter-final =====
23 March	Cruzeiro	5–0	Patrocinense	Belo Horizonte
19:00 UTC−3	Fred 7'; Rodriguinho 22', 74'; Marquinhos Gabriel 46', 48'	Report		Stadium: Mineirão; Attendance: 19,998; Referee: Ronei Cândido Alves

===== Semi-finals =====
31 March First leg	América Mineiro	2–3	Cruzeiro	Belo Horizonte
16:00 UTC−3	Diego Jussani 57'; Jonatas Belusso 83'	Report	Fred 17', 51', 70'	Stadium: Independência; Attendance: 6,746; Referee: Marcelo de Lima Henrique

6 April Second leg	Cruzeiro	3–0 (6–2 agg.)	América Mineiro	Belo Horizonte
19:00 UTC−3	Léo 15'; Fred 19'; Rafinha 88'	Report		Stadium: Mineirão; Attendance: 51,525; Referee: Leandro Pedro Vuaden

===== Final =====
14 April First leg	Cruzeiro	2–1	Atlético Mineiro	Belo Horizonte
16:00 UTC−3	Marquinhos Gabriel 45'; Léo 61'	Report	Ricardo Oliveira 55'	Stadium: Mineirão; Attendance: 51,032; Referee: Wagner do Nascimento Magalhães

20 April Second leg	Atlético Mineiro	1–1 (2–3 agg.)	Cruzeiro	Belo Horizonte
16:30 UTC−3	Elias 29'	Report	Fred 79' (pen.)	Stadium: Independência; Attendance: 21,862; Referee: Leandro Bizzio Miranda

=== Campeonato Brasileiro Série A ===
League play paused for one month between rounds 9 and 10 for the 2019 Copa América hosted in Brazil.

==== League table ====
Pos	Team	Pld	W	D	L	GF	GA	GD	Pts	Qualification or relegation
15	Botafogo	38	13	4	21	31	45	−14	43	
16	Ceará	38	10	9	19	36	41	−5	39	
17	Cruzeiro (R)	38	7	15	16	27	46	−19	36	Relegation to Campeonato Brasileiro Série B
18	CSA (R)	38	8	8	22	24	58	−34	32	Relegation to Campeonato Brasileiro Série B
19	Chapecoense (R)	38	7	11	20	31	52	−21	32	Relegation to Campeonato Brasileiro Série B

Source: CBF
Rules for classification: 1) points; 2) wins; 3) goal difference; 4) goals scored; 5) head-to-head results; 6) least red cards received; 7) least yellow cards received; 8) draw.
(R) Relegated

==== Results by round ====
Round	1	2	3	4	5	6	7	8	9	10	11	12	13	14	15	16	17	18	19	20	21	22	23	24	25	26	27	28	29	30	31	32	33	34	35	36	37	38
Ground	A	H	H	A	A	H	A	H	A	H	A	H	A	A	H	A	H	H	A	H	A	A	H	H	A	H	A	H	A	H	A	H	H	A	H	A	A	H
Result	L	W	W	L	L	L	D	D	L	D	D	L	L	D	W	D	W	L	L	L	D	L	D	D	D	W	W	D	W	D	D	D	D	L	L	L	L	L
Position	15	14	7	11	15	16	15	14	18	17	16	16	18	17	16	16	16	16	17	18	17	17	18	18	18	18	17	17	16	16	16	16	16	17	17	17	17	17

Updated to match(es) played on 8 December 2019. Source: Matches
A = Away; H = Home; W = Win; D = Draw; L = Loss

==== Matches ====
27 April 1	Flamengo	3–1	Cruzeiro	Rio de Janeiro
21:00 UTC−3	Bruno Henrique 40', 67'; Gabriel 89'	Report	Pedro Rocha 39'	Stadium: Maracanã; Attendance: 35,016; Referee: Anderson Daronco

1 May 2	Cruzeiro	1–0	Ceará	Belo Horizonte
19:15 UTC−3	Thiago Neves 49'	Report		Stadium: Mineirão; Attendance: 22,677; Referee: Wagner Reway

5 May 3	Cruzeiro	2–1	Goiás	Belo Horizonte
16:00 UTC−3	Dedé 48'; Rodriguinho 80'	Report	Michael 56'	Stadium: Mineirão; Attendance: 19,735; Referee: Rodrigo Carvalhaes de Miranda

12 May 4	Internacional	3–1	Cruzeiro	Porto Alegre
16:00 UTC−3	Nonato 31'; Guerrero 55'; Rodrigo Moledo 82'	Report	Dedé 35'	Stadium: Beira-Rio; Attendance: 21,483; Referee: Raphael Claus

18 May 5	Fluminense	4–1	Cruzeiro	Rio de Janeiro
18:00 UTC−3	Nino 44'; Luciano 46'; João Pedro 81', 90+4'	Report	Robinho 49'	Stadium: Maracanã; Attendance: 11,437; Referee: Flávio Rodrigues de Souza

26 May 6	Cruzeiro	1–2	Chapecoense	Belo Horizonte
19:00 UTC−3	Thiago Neves 56'	Report	Rildo 52'; Diego Torres 84'	Stadium: Independência; Attendance: 18,039; Referee: Dewson Fernando Freitas da Silva

2 June 7	São Paulo	1–1	Cruzeiro	São Paulo
16:00 UTC−3	Alexandre Pato 14'	Report	Thiago Neves 67'	Stadium: Pacaembu; Attendance: 8,517; Referee: Bráulio da Silva Machado

8 June 8	Cruzeiro	0–0	Corinthians	Belo Horizonte
19:00 UTC−3		Report		Stadium: Mineirão; Attendance: 21,370; Referee: Marcelo de Lima Henrique

12 June 9	Fortaleza	2–1	Cruzeiro	Fortaleza
21:00 UTC−3	André Luis 2', 45+1'	Report	Sassá 10'	Stadium: Castelão; Attendance: 17,099; Referee: Héber Roberto Lopes

14 July 10	Cruzeiro	0–0	Botafogo	Belo Horizonte
16:00 UTC−3		Report		Stadium: Mineirão; Attendance: 18,012; Referee: Leandro Pedro Vuaden

20 July 11	Bahia	0–0	Cruzeiro	Salvador
17:00 UTC−3		Report		Stadium: Fonte Nova; Attendance: 18,583; Referee: Luiz Flávio de Oliveira

27 July 12	Cruzeiro	0–2	Athletico Paranaense	Belo Horizonte
19:00 UTC−3		Report	Jonathan 29' (pen.); Bruno Guimarães 77'	Stadium: Mineirão; Attendance: 20,689; Referee: Rodrigo Carvalhaes de Miranda

4 August 13	Atlético Mineiro	2–0	Cruzeiro	Belo Horizonte
19:00 UTC−3	Vinícius Goes 45+1'; Nathan 90+1'	Report		Stadium: Independência; Attendance: 13,181; Referee: Leandro Pedro Vuaden

11 August 14	Avaí	2–2	Cruzeiro	Florianópolis
16:00 UTC−3	Pedro Castro 22'; Brenner 74' (pen.)	Report	Pedro Rocha 62'; Sassá 90+2'	Stadium: Ressacada; Attendance: 4,921; Referee: Paulo Roberto Alves Júnior

18 August 15	Cruzeiro	2–0	Santos	Belo Horizonte
16:00 UTC−3	Fred 43'; Thiago Neves 46'	Report		Stadium: Mineirão; Attendance: 43,604; Referee: Anderson Daronco

25 August 16	CSA	1–1	Cruzeiro	Maceió
19:00 UTC−3	Apodi 90+3'	Report	Fred 10'	Stadium: Rei Pelé; Attendance: 8,715; Referee: Marcelo de Lima Henrique

1 September 17	Cruzeiro	1–0	Vasco da Gama	Belo Horizonte
19:00 UTC−3	Maurício 81'	Report		Stadium: Mineirão; Attendance: 26,052; Referee: Marcelo Aparecido Ribeiro de Souza

8 September 18	Cruzeiro	1–4	Grêmio	Belo Horizonte
11:00 UTC−3	Fred 36' (pen.)	Report	Diego Tardelli 18'; Alisson 27'; Everton 63', 76'	Stadium: Independência; Attendance: 14,208; Referee: Rafael Traci

14 September 19	Palmeiras	1–0	Cruzeiro	São Paulo
19:00 UTC−3	Bruno Henrique 45+1'	Report		Stadium: Allianz Parque; Attendance: 35,578; Referee: Rodolpho Toski Marques

21 September 20	Cruzeiro	1–2	Flamengo	Belo Horizonte
19:00 UTC−3	Thiago Neves 38' (pen.)	Report	Gabriel 6'; De Arrascaeta 66'	Stadium: Mineirão; Attendance: 40,333; Referee: Raphael Claus

25 September 21	Ceará	0–0	Cruzeiro	Fortaleza
19:30 UTC−3		Report		Stadium: Castelão; Attendance: 18,595; Referee: Bráulio da Silva Machado

30 September 22	Goiás	1–0	Cruzeiro	Goiânia
20:00 UTC−3	Alan Ruschel 62'	Report		Stadium: Serra Dourada; Attendance: 20,884; Referee: Gilberto Rodrigues Castro Júnior

5 October 23	Cruzeiro	1–1	Internacional	Belo Horizonte
21:00 UTC−3	Fred 62' (pen.)	Report	Nonato 10'	Stadium: Mineirão; Attendance: 22,561; Referee: Wagner do Nascimento Magalhães

9 October 24	Cruzeiro	0–0	Fluminense	Belo Horizonte
21:30 UTC−3		Report		Stadium: Mineirão; Attendance: 38,133; Referee: Jean Pierre Gonçalves Lima

13 October 25	Chapecoense	1–1	Cruzeiro	Chapecó
19:00 UTC−3	Camilo 90+4'	Report	Dedé 3'	Stadium: Arena Condá; Attendance: 4,399; Referee: Caio Max Augusto Vieira

16 October 26	Cruzeiro	1–0	São Paulo	Belo Horizonte
21:00 UTC−3	Thiago Neves 58'	Report		Stadium: Mineirão; Attendance: 30,969; Referee: Wilton Pereira Sampaio

19 October 27	Corinthians	1–2	Cruzeiro	São Paulo
19:00 UTC−3	Fagner 33'	Report	Fred 37' (pen.); Éderson 71'	Stadium: Arena Corinthians; Attendance: 31,631; Referee: Bruno Arleu de Araújo

26 October 28	Cruzeiro	1–1	Fortaleza	Belo Horizonte
21:00 UTC−3	Orejuela 79'	Report	Wellington Paulista 82'	Stadium: Mineirão; Attendance: 32,268; Referee: Raphael Claus

31 October 29	Botafogo	0–2	Cruzeiro	Rio de Janeiro
21:30 UTC−3		Report	Cacá 26'; Éderson 90+6'	Stadium: Nilton Santos; Attendance: 22,412; Referee: Caio Max Augusto Vieira

3 November 30	Cruzeiro	1–1	Bahia	Belo Horizonte
19:00 UTC−3	Sassá 73'	Report	Fernandão 66' (pen.)	Stadium: Mineirão; Attendance: 25,913; Referee: Wagner Reway

6 November 31	Athletico Paranaense	0–0	Cruzeiro	Curitiba
21:30 UTC−3		Report		Stadium: Arena da Baixada; Attendance: 11,838; Referee: Luiz Flávio de Oliveira

10 November 32	Cruzeiro	0–0	Atlético Mineiro	Belo Horizonte
16:00 UTC−3		Report		Stadium: Mineirão; Attendance: 43,205; Referee: Jean Pierre Gonçalves Lima

18 November 33	Cruzeiro	0–0	Avaí	Belo Horizonte
20:00 UTC−3		Report		Stadium: Mineirão; Attendance: 21,217; Referee: Diego Pombo Lopez

23 November 34	Santos	4–1	Cruzeiro	Santos
21:00 UTC−3	Eduardo Sasha 23'; Marinho 59'; Soteldo 64'; Diego Pituca 89'	Report	Orejuela 13'	Stadium: Vila Belmiro; Attendance: 7,905; Referee: Leandro Pedro Vuaden

28 November 35	Cruzeiro	0–1	CSA	Belo Horizonte
21:30 UTC−3		Report	Alan Costa 43'	Stadium: Mineirão; Attendance: 34,290; Referee: Vinicius Gonçalves Dias Araújo

2 December 36	Vasco da Gama	1–0	Cruzeiro	Rio de Janeiro
20:00 UTC−3	Guarín 10'	Report		Stadium: São Januário; Attendance: 19,796; Referee: Wilton Pereira Sampaio

5 December 37	Grêmio	2–0	Cruzeiro	Porto Alegre
19:15 UTC−3	Ferreira 66'; Pepê 85' (pen.)	Report		Stadium: Arena do Grêmio; Attendance: 18,306; Referee: André Luiz de Freitas Castro

8 December 38	Cruzeiro	0–2	Palmeiras	Belo Horizonte
16:00 UTC−3		Report	Zé Rafael 57'; Dudu 83'	Stadium: Mineirão; Attendance: 27,229; Referee: Marcelo de Lima Henrique

=== Copa do Brasil ===
As Cruzeiro participated in the 2019 Copa Libertadores, the club entered the Copa do Brasil in the round of 16, whose draw was held on 2 May.

==== Round of 16 ====
15 May First leg	Fluminense	1–1	Cruzeiro	Rio de Janeiro
21:30 UTC−3	João Pedro 90+3'	Report	Pedro Rocha 57'	Stadium: Maracanã; Attendance: 16,806; Referee: Luiz Flávio de Oliveira

5 June Second leg	Cruzeiro	2–2 (3–3 agg.) (3–1 p)	Fluminense	Belo Horizonte
19:15 UTC−3	Thiago Neves 58', 80' (pen.)	Report	Ganso 15' (pen.); João Pedro 90+5'	Stadium: Mineirão; Attendance: 47,460; Referee: Rafael Traci
	Penalties
	Lucas Silva (penalty missed); Lucas Romero (penalty missed); Pedro Rocha (penalty scored); Sassá (penalty scored); Thiago Neves (penalty scored)		(penalty missed) Ganso; (penalty scored) Caio Henrique; (penalty missed) João Pedro; (penalty missed) Gilberto

==== Quarter-finals ====
11 July First leg	Cruzeiro	3–0	Atlético Mineiro	Belo Horizonte
20:00 UTC−3	Pedro Rocha 12'; Thiago Neves 26'; Robinho 54'	Report		Stadium: Mineirão; Attendance: 51,958; Referee: Raphael Claus

17 July Second leg	Atlético Mineiro	2–0 (2–3 agg.)	Cruzeiro	Belo Horizonte
19:15 UTC−3	Cazares 34'; Patric 90+2'	Report		Stadium: Independência; Attendance: 22,145; Referee: Flávio Rodrigues de Souza

==== Semi-finals ====
7 August First leg	Cruzeiro	0–1	Internacional	Belo Horizonte
21:30 UTC−3		Report	Edenílson 75'	Stadium: Mineirão; Attendance: 33,344; Referee: Luiz Flávio de Oliveira

4 September Second leg	Internacional	3–0 (4–0 agg.)	Cruzeiro	Porto Alegre
21:30 UTC−3	Guerrero 39', 69'; Edenílson 89'	Report		Stadium: Beira-Rio; Attendance: 43,175; Referee: Flavio Rodrigues de Souza

=== Copa Libertadores ===
The group stage draw for the 2019 Copa Libertadores was made on 17 December 2018. Cruzeiro were drawn into Group B with Emelec, Huracán and Deportivo Lara.

==== Group stage ====
Pos	Team	Pld	W	D	L	GF	GA	GD	Pts	Qualification	CRU	EME	LAR	HUR
1	(Brazil) Cruzeiro	6	5	0	1	11	2	+9	15	Round of 16	—	1–2	2–0	4–0
2	(Ecuador) Emelec	6	2	3	1	6	5	+1	9	Round of 16	0–1	—	2–2	0–0
3	(Venezuela) Deportivo Lara	6	1	2	3	4	10	−6	5	Copa Sudamericana	0–2	0–0	—	2–1
4	(Argentina) Huracán	6	1	1	4	5	9	−4	4		0–1	1–2	3–0	—

Source: CONMEBOL
Rules for classification: Group stage tiebreakers

7 March 1	Huracán (Argentina)	0–1	(Brazil) Cruzeiro	Buenos Aires, Argentina
19:00 UTC−4		Report	Rodriguinho 30'	Stadium: El Palacio; Attendance: 12,000; Referee: Diego Haro (Peru)

27 March 2	Cruzeiro (Brazil)	2–0	(Venezuela) Deportivo Lara	Belo Horizonte, Brazil
19:30 UTC−3	Rodriguinho 7'; Jadson 90+5'	Report		Stadium: Mineirão; Attendance: 39,595; Referee: Piero Maza (Chile)

3 April 3	Emelec (Ecuador)	0–1	(Brazil) Cruzeiro	Guayaquil, Ecuador
21:30 UTC−5		Report	Rodriguinho 32'	Stadium: George Capwell; Attendance: 15,000; Referee: Víctor Hugo Carrillo (Peru)

10 April 4	Cruzeiro (Brazil)	4–0	(Argentina) Huracán	Belo Horizonte, Brazil
19:30 UTC−4	Fred 19', 23', 32'; Dodô 83'	Report		Stadium: Mineirão; Attendance: 31,694; Referee: Julio Bascuñán (Chile)

23 April 5	Deportivo Lara (Venezuela)	0–2	(Brazil) Cruzeiro	Cabudare, Venezuela
17:00 UTC−3		Report	Fred 31'; Sassá 78' (pen.)	Stadium: Metropolitano de Lara; Attendance: 0 Referee: Gery Vargas (Bolivia)

8 May 6	Cruzeiro (Brazil)	1–2	(Ecuador) Emelec	Belo Horizonte, Brazil
19:15 UTC−3	Sassá 67'	Report	Fábio 41' (o.g.); Brayan Angulo 90' (pen.)	Stadium: Mineirão; Attendance: 24,417; Referee: Andrés Rojas (Colombia)

==== Knockout stage ====
===== Round of 16 =====
The draw for the knockout stages of the Copa Libertadores was held on 13 May.

23 July First leg	River Plate (Argentina)	0–0	(Brazil) Cruzeiro	Buenos Aires, Argentina
19:15 UTC−4		Report		Stadium: Monumental de Nuñez; Attendance: 50,342; Referee: Julio Bascuñán (Chile)

30 July Second leg	Cruzeiro (Brazil)	0–0 (0–0 agg.) (2–4 p)	(Argentina) River Plate	Belo Horizonte, Brazil
19:15 UTC−3		Report		Stadium: Mineirão; Attendance: 55,567; Referee: Roberto Tobar (Chile)
	Penalties
	Henrique (penalty missed); Fred (penalty scored); David (penalty missed); Robinho (penalty scored)		(penalty scored) De La Cruz; (penalty scored) Montiel; (penalty scored) Lucas Martínez; (penalty scored) Borré
