= 2019 Copa Libertadores final =

- Promotional poster of the final
- Event: 2019 Copa Libertadores
Flamengo	River Plate
(Brazil)	(Argentina)
2	1
- Date: 23 November 2019
- Venue: Estadio Monumental, Lima
- Referee: Roberto Tobar (Chile)
- Attendance: 78,573

The 2019 Copa Libertadores final was the final match which decided the winner of the 2019 Copa Libertadores, the 60th edition of the Copa Libertadores, South American's top-tier continental club football tournament organized by CONMEBOL. The match was played on 23 November 2019 at the Estadio Monumental in Lima, Peru, between Brazilian team Flamengo and the defending champions, River Plate from Argentina. This was the first Copa Libertadores final to be played as a single match at a neutral venue chosen in advance, replacing the previous home-and-away format.

Flamengo won the match 2–1, securing their second tournament title. As champions, they qualified as the CONMEBOL representative at the 2019 FIFA Club World Cup and the 2020 Recopa Sudamericana. They also automatically qualified for the 2020 Copa Libertadores group stage.

== Teams ==
Team	Previous finals appearances (bold indicates winners)
(Brazil) Flamengo	1 (**1981**)
(Argentina) River Plate	6 (1966, 1976, **1986**, **1996**, **2015**, **2018**)

== Venue ==
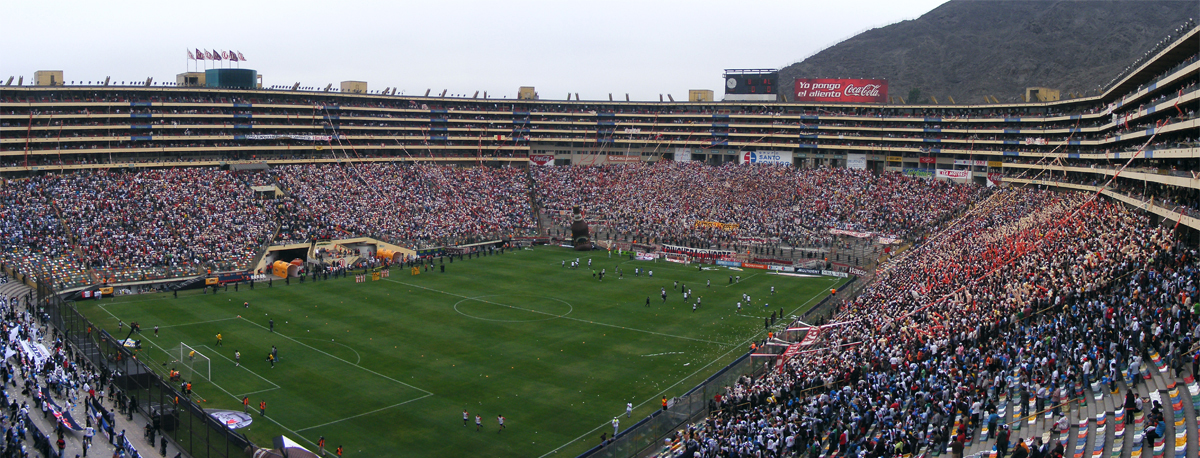
Estadio Monumental in Lima hosted the final

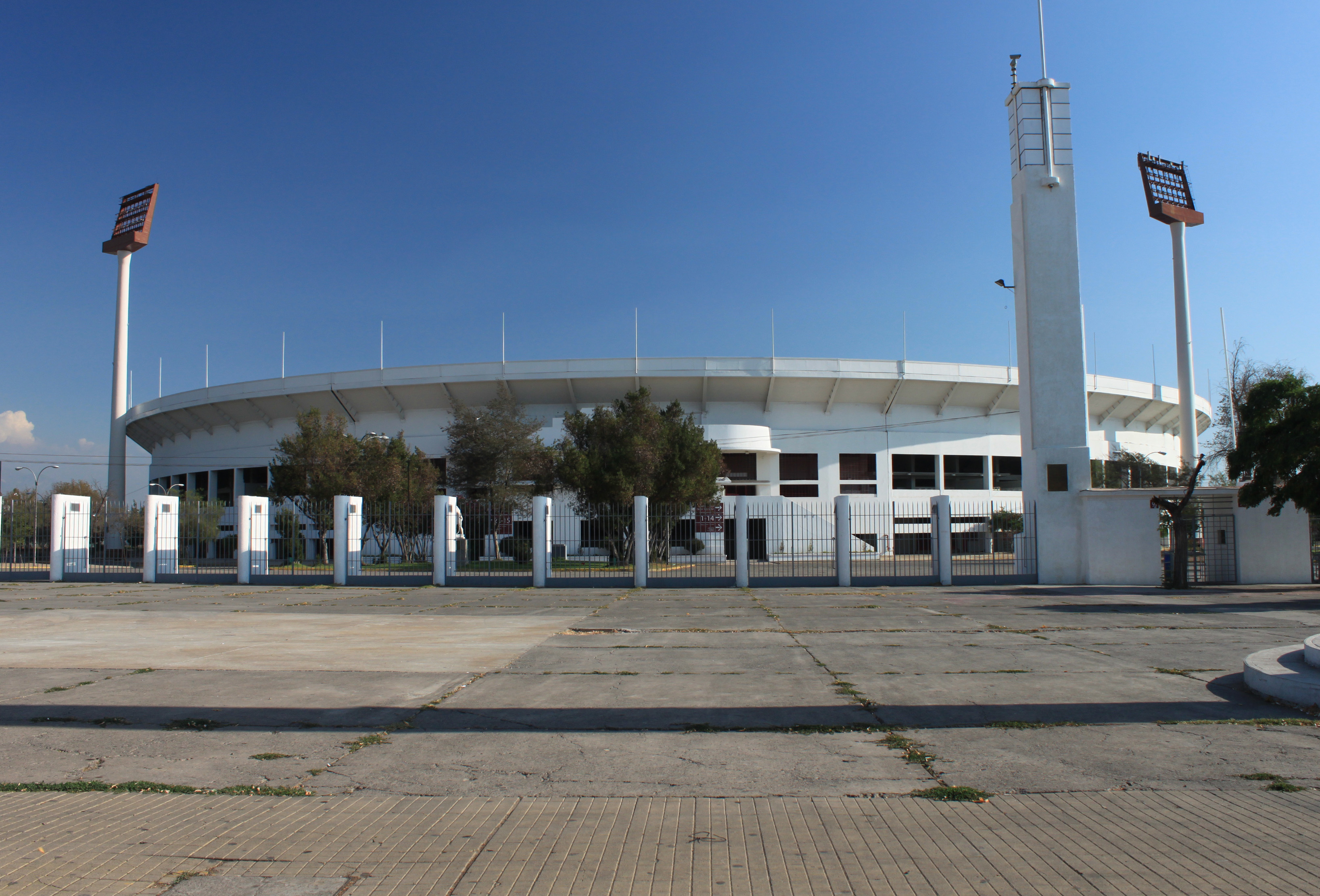
The Estadio Nacional Julio Martínez Prádanos in Santiago was originally selected to host the final, until the CONMEBOL decided to move the venue to Estadio Monumental in Lima, Peru due to 2019 Chilean protests.

The match was played at the Estadio Monumental in Lima, Peru. Originally scheduled at the Estadio Nacional in Santiago, Chile, the match had to be relocated to the Estadio Monumental in Lima due to protests in Chile. It was the first final to be played as a single match at a neutral venue chosen in advance, replacing the home-and-away format used from 1960 to 2018. The second leg of the 2018 final was played at Santiago Bernabéu Stadium in Madrid, Spain, the first final held outside of South America, after security concerns cancelled the original second leg at the stadium of River Plate in Buenos Aires.

This was the fourth Copa Libertadores final held in Lima, after the play-off of the 1971 finals and the first legs of the 1972 and 1997 finals, all matches played at the Estadio Nacional.

=== Original host selection ===
In 2016, CONMEBOL proposed that the Copa Libertadores final be played as a single match instead of over two legs. It was only on 23 February 2018 that CONMEBOL was able to confirm that the 2019 final onwards would be played as a single match at a venue chosen in advance, and on 11 June 2018 set the date of the match as 23 November 2019. With the Argentine and Brazilian cities banned by CONMEBOL for this bidding, three national associations had officialized interest in hosting the 2019 Copa Libertadores final.

Bidding Venues for the 2019 Copa Libertadores final
Association	Stadium	City	Capacity	Notes
Chile	Estadio Nacional Julio Martínez Prádanos	Santiago	**58,665**	
Peru	Estadio Nacional	Lima	**50,000**	Bid selected to host 2019 Copa Sudamericana final
Uruguay	Estadio Centenario	Montevideo	**60,235**	Bid withdrawn

On 14 August 2018, the CONMEBOL Council selected the Estadio Nacional Julio Martínez Prádanos in Santiago, Chile as the venue of the 2019 Copa Libertadores final while the Estadio Nacional in Lima had been chosen to host the 2019 Copa Sudamericana final. The Uruguayan Football Association withdrew its bid because Estadio Centenario did not meet the CONMEBOL requirements.

=== Relocation to Lima ===
Large street protests in Chile began on 14 October 2019, involving millions of protestors and resulting in the deaths of at least 24 people. The protests led to safety concerns for the teams that would play the match and their travelling fans, despite this CONMEBOL still considered Santiago as the venue. Eventually, after a meeting of the CONMEBOL president with the presidents of both finalists and those of their football associations and the Football Federation of Chile president, on 5 November it was announced that the match was relocated to the Estadio Monumental in Lima, Peru, due to the ongoing unrest in Chile.

== Road to the final ==
Note: In all scores below, the score of the home team is given first.

(Brazil) Flamengo			Round	(Argentina) River Plate		
Opponent	Venue	Score		Opponent	Venue	Score
Bye			Qualifying stages	Bye		
**Group D**			Group stage	**Group A**		
(Bolivia) San José	Away	0–1	Group stage	(Peru) Alianza Lima	Away	1–1
(Ecuador) LDU Quito	Home	3–1	Group stage	(Chile) Palestino	Home	0–0
(Uruguay) Peñarol	Home	0–1	Group stage	(Brazil) Internacional	Away	2–2
(Bolivia) San José	Home	6–1	Group stage	(Peru) Alianza Lima	Home	3–0
(Ecuador) LDU Quito	Away	2–1	Group stage	(Chile) Palestino	Away	0–2
(Uruguay) Peñarol	Away	0–0	Group stage	(Brazil) Internacional	Home	2–2
Pos / Team / Pld / Pts; **1** / (Brazil) Flamengo / **6** / **10**; 2 / (Ecuador) LDU Quito / 6 / **10**; 3 / (Uruguay) Peñarol / 6 / **10**; 4 / (Bolivia) San José / 6 / **4**; Source: CONMEBOL			Group stage	Pos / Team / Pld / Pts; 1 / (Brazil) Internacional / 6 / **14**; **2** / (Argentina) River Plate / **6** / **10**; 3 / (Chile) Palestino / 6 / **7**; 4 / (Peru) Alianza Lima / 6 / **1**; Source: CONMEBOL		
**Seed 7**			Final stages	**Seed 10**		
(Ecuador) Emelec (tied 2–2 on aggregate, won 4–2 on penalties)	Away	2–0	Round of 16	(Brazil) Cruzeiro (tied 0–0 on aggregate, won 4–2 on penalties)	Home	0–0
(Ecuador) Emelec (tied 2–2 on aggregate, won 4–2 on penalties)	Home	2–0	Round of 16	(Brazil) Cruzeiro (tied 0–0 on aggregate, won 4–2 on penalties)	Away	0–0
(Brazil) Internacional (won 3–1 on aggregate)	Home	2–0	Quarter-finals	(Paraguay) Cerro Porteño (won 3–1 on aggregate)	Home	2–0
(Brazil) Internacional (won 3–1 on aggregate)	Away	1–1	Quarter-finals	(Paraguay) Cerro Porteño (won 3–1 on aggregate)	Away	1–1
(Brazil) Grêmio (won 6–1 on aggregate)	Away	1–1	Semi-finals	(Argentina) Boca Juniors (won 2–1 on aggregate)	Home	2–0
(Brazil) Grêmio (won 6–1 on aggregate)	Home	5–0	Semi-finals	(Argentina) Boca Juniors (won 2–1 on aggregate)	Away	1–0

== Format ==
The final is played as a single match at a pre-selected venue, with the higher-seeded team designated as the "home" team for administrative purposes. If scores are level after full time, 30 minutes of extra time would be played. If still tied after extra time, a penalty shoot-out would be used to determine the winner.

== Pre-match ==
=== Officials ===
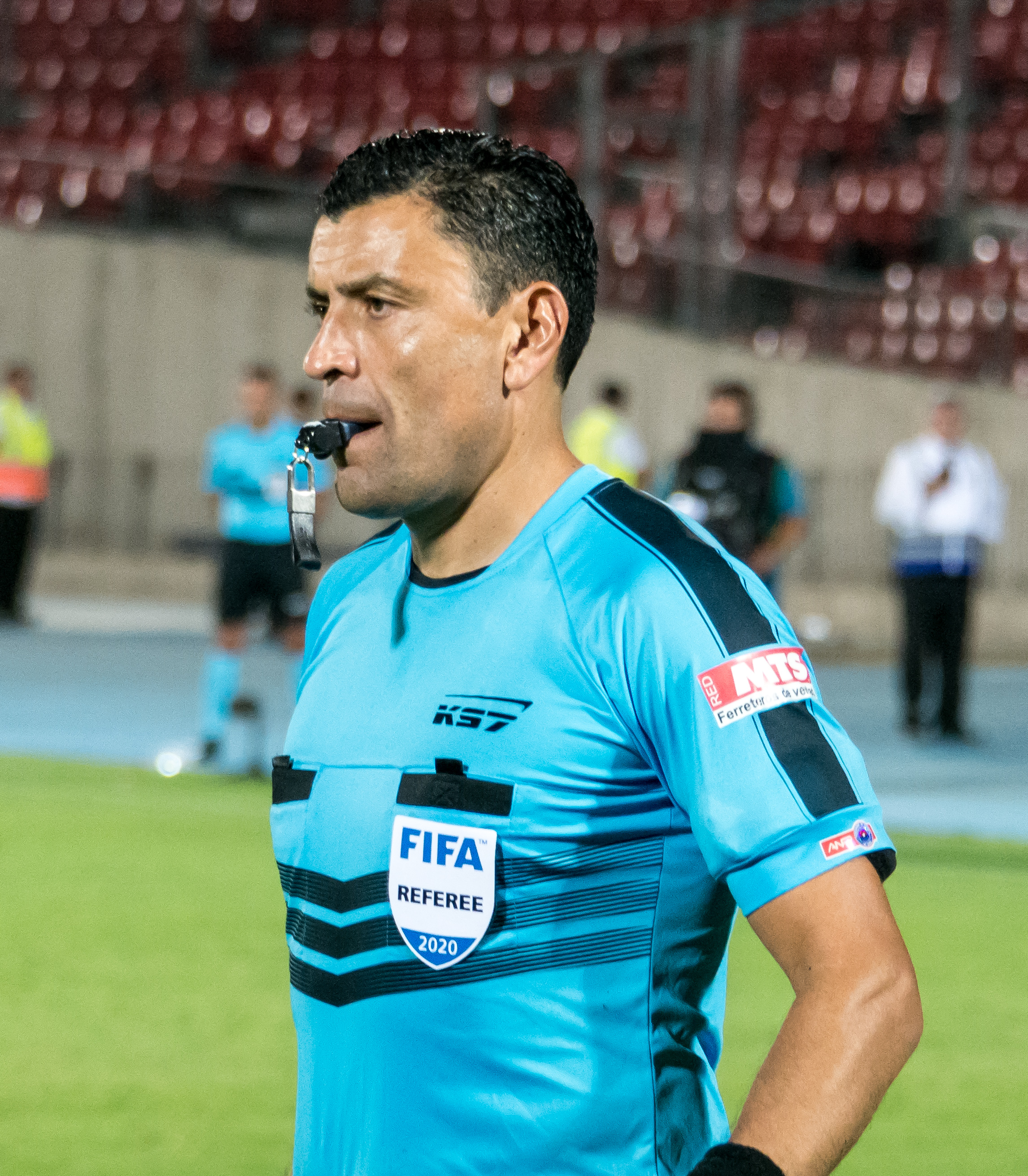
Chilean referee Roberto Tobar officiated the final.

On 12 November 2019, Chilean referee Roberto Tobar was appointed to take charge of the final by CONMEBOL, along with fellow Chileans Christian Schiemann and Claudio Ríos as assistant referees, and Colombian Andrés Rojas as the fourth official. Tobar was a FIFA referee from 2011 to 2022. They were originally joined by Peruvian Diego Haro as the video assistant referee (VAR), with Piero Maza from Chile, Alexander Guzmán from Colombia and Esteban Ostojich from Uruguay as the assistants VAR officials (AVARs).

A week later, CONMEBOL decided to remove Diego Haro for giving interviews without prior authorization before the match. Haro was replaced by Ostojich in the VAR while Peruvian Víctor Hugo Carrillo joined as AVAR.

=== Fan Fest ===
During the three days leading up to the match, CONMEBOL held an event called “Embajada del Hincha” (Fan Embassy) aimed at fans of both finalist teams and the general public. The event took place at the Domos Art, in the coastal area of the San Miguel district from 20–22 November and featured a variety of activities for fans, including musical performances by local and foreign artists and a public display of the Copa Libertadores trophy.

On the last day, a friendly minifootball match was held between former players from both teams. The River Plate team included Nery Pumpido, Oscar Ruggeri, Juan Pablo Sorín, Mario Yepes, Juan Pablo Ángel and Fernando Cavenaghi while the Flamengo side featured Júlio César, Juan, Luizão, Diego Gavilán and Júnior Baiano. The match ended in a 6–6 draw.

=== Opening show ===
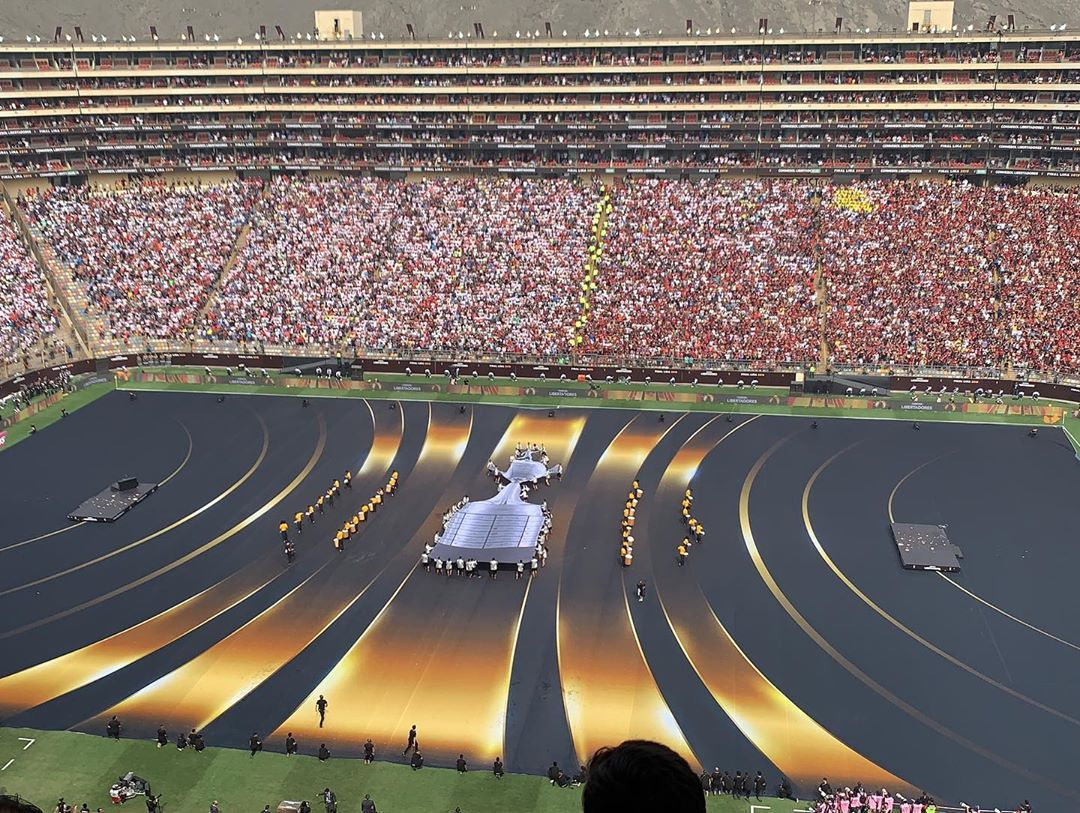
The stadium during the opening ceremony.

Before the match, the Argentineans Fito Páez and Tini Stoessel, the Colombian Sebastián Yatra and the Brazilian Anitta, who performed "Y dale alegría a mi corazón" by Páez. Then two bands identified with the finalist teams participated: Turf, for River Plate and Gabriel o Pensador, for Flamengo.

== Match ==
=== Summary ===
River Plate opened the match in a 2–3–3–2 formation, which allowed their midfield to dominate. This tactic gained them an early lead, when Rafael Santos Borré scored in the 14th minute from a cross by Ignacio Fernández. River Plate had numerous chances for a second goal in the first half: Borré missed an opportunity by inches, Nicolás De La Cruz missed a good chance in the 21st minute, and Exequiel Palacios had two long-distance shots that nearly went in. However River Plate were unable to capitalise on these opportunities, so at half time the score remained 1-0.

River Plate continued to dominate in the early part of the second half. However, Flamengo began to assert themselves on the counter-attack, with Gabriel Barbosa and Éverton Ribeiro nearly scoring while Borré was down with an injury. Flamengo substitute Diego was brought on for Gerson in the 66th minute, and he helped Flamengo turn the match around. Diego began several counter-attacks, including in the 75th minute when he linked up with Bruno Henrique Pinto and Gabriel. The score was still 1-0 in the 89th minute, with River Plate seeking to finish off the game, when Flamengo's Arrascaeta won the ball from Lucas Pratto in his own half, and started a counter-attack by passing to Bruno Henrique. Henrique dribbled the ball down the left wing and cut inside; near the opposing goal, he passed the ball to Arrascaeta, who avoided the goalkeeper's challenge to pass to an open Gabriel who scored a tap-in to tie the game.

Three minutes later (in the second minute of injury time), Diego launched a deep pass from his own half that both River Plate centre backs missed. This allowed Gabriel to score again from a half volley, giving Flamengo a 2–1 lead. The sudden reversal of fortune caused tempers to flare: Palacios kicked Bruno Henrique in the 95th minute, for which he received a red card. Gabriel Barbosa sarcastically applauded the referee in response; he also received a red card. The match ended shortly thereafter. After being behind for most of the match, Flamengo emerged as last minute champions, winning their second Copa Libertadores title.

=== Details ===
23 November 2019
15:00 UTC−5

Flamengo (Brazil)	2–1	(Argentina) River Plate
Gabriel Barbosa 89', 90+2'	Report	Borré 14'

Estadio Monumental, Lima
Attendance: 78,573
Referee: Roberto Tobar (Chile)

**Flamengo**	**River Plate**

GK	1	(Brazil) Diego Alves
RB	18	(Brazil) Rafinha	(yellow card) 79'
CB	3	(Brazil) Rodrigo Caio
CB	24	(Spain) Pablo Marí	(yellow card) 54'
LB	21	(Brazil) Filipe Luís
CM	5	(Brazil) Willian Arão		(substituted off) 85'
CM	15	(Brazil) Gerson		(substituted off) 65'
RW	7	(Brazil) Éverton Ribeiro (c)
AM	14	(Uruguay) Giorgian de Arrascaeta		(substituted off) 90+2'
LW	27	(Brazil) Bruno Henrique
CF	9	(Brazil) Gabriel Barbosa	(yellow card) 90+2' (red card) 90+5'
Substitutes:
GK	12	(Brazil) César
DF	2	(Brazil) Rodinei
DF	4	(Brazil) Rhodolfo
DF	6	(Brazil) Renê
DF	26	(Brazil) Matheus Thuler
MF	10	(Brazil) Diego		(substituted on) 65'
MF	13	(Brazil) Vinícius Souza
MF	19	(Brazil) Reinier
MF	25	(Paraguay) Robert Piris Da Motta		(substituted on) 90+2'
FW	11	(Brazil) Vitinho		(substituted on) 85'
FW	20	(Brazil) Lincoln
FW	28	(Colombia) Orlando Berrío
Manager:
(Portugal) Jorge Jesus

GK	1	(Argentina) Franco Armani
RB	29	(Argentina) Gonzalo Montiel
CB	28	(Argentina) Lucas Martínez Quarta
CB	22	(Argentina) Javier Pinola (c)
LB	20	(Argentina) Milton Casco	(yellow card) 29'	(substituted off) 76'
DM	24	(Argentina) Enzo Pérez	(yellow card) 70'
RM	15	(Argentina) Exequiel Palacios	(red card) 90+5'
LM	11	(Uruguay) Nicolás de la Cruz
AM	26	(Argentina) Ignacio Fernández		(substituted off) 68'
CF	19	(Colombia) Rafael Santos Borré		(substituted off) 74'
CF	7	(Argentina) Matías Suárez	(yellow card) 45+1'
Substitutes:
GK	14	(Argentina) Germán Lux
GK	25	(Argentina) Enrique Bologna
DF	2	(Paraguay) Robert Rojas
DF	4	(Argentina) Fabrizio Angileri
DF	6	(Chile) Paulo Díaz		(substituted on) 76'
MF	5	(Argentina) Bruno Zuculini
MF	10	(Colombia) Juan Fernando Quintero
MF	21	(Argentina) Cristian Ferreira
MF	23	(Argentina) Leonardo Ponzio
FW	9	(Argentina) Julián Álvarez		(substituted on) 68'
FW	27	(Argentina) Lucas Pratto		(substituted on) 74'
FW	30	(Argentina) Ignacio Scocco
Manager:
(Argentina) Marcelo Gallardo

Assistant referees:
Christian Schiemann (Chile)
Claudio Ríos (Chile)
Fourth official:
Andrés Rojas (Colombia)
Video assistant referee:
Esteban Ostojich (Uruguay)
Assistant video assistant referees:
Piero Maza (Chile)
Alexander Guzmán (Colombia)
Víctor Hugo Carrillo (Peru)

**Match rules**

- 90 minutes.
- 30 minutes of extra time if necessary.
- Penalty shoot-out if scores still level.
- Twelve named substitutes.
- Maximum of three substitutions, with a fourth allowed in extra time.

== Post-match ==
Flamengo won their second Copa Libertadores and earned the right to represent CONMEBOL at the 2019 FIFA Club World Cup in Qatar. Jorge Jesus became the second non-South American manager to win the Copa Libertadores, following Mirko Jozić's 1991 championship for Colo-Colo. The club went on to clinch the Campeonato Brasileiro Série A title a day later after the second-place team, Palmeiras, was mathematically eliminated from reaching the title. Flamengo became the first Brazilian club to earn a league and continental double since Santos did in 1963. The victory celebrations in Rio de Janeiro attracted tens of thousands of fans as the players rode in an open-top bus, but ended with clashes between riot police and spectators.

Flamengo's two late goals to overturn a 0–1 deficit invited comparisons to the 1999 UEFA Champions League final, in which Manchester United defeated Bayern Munich in a similar fashion.

== Broadcasting ==
In Brazil, the match was broadcast by Rede Globo with commentary provided by Luiz Roberto, Júnior and Walter Casagrande, in addition to Fox Sports on cable television with commentary provided by Nivaldo Prieto, Edmundo and Paulo Vinicius Coelho. The original broadcast received an Ibope Rating of 38 points in the 15 largest metropolitan regions in Brazil, reaching a total of 65.7 million viewers, with almost half of the television sets in Brazil watching the Globo broadcast.

== See also ==
- 2019 Copa Sudamericana final
- 2020 Recopa Sudamericana
