= 2019 Copa Libertadores qualifying stages =

The 2019 Copa Libertadores qualifying stages were played from 22 January to 28 February 2019. A total of 19 teams competed in the qualifying stages to decide four of the 32 places in the group stage of the 2019 Copa Libertadores.

== Draw ==
The draw for the qualifying stages was held on 17 December 2018, 20:30 PYST (UTC−3), at the CONMEBOL Convention Centre in Luque, Paraguay.

Teams were seeded by their CONMEBOL ranking of the Copa Libertadores as of 15 December 2018 (shown in parentheses), taking into account the following three factors:

1. Performance in the last 10 years, taking into account Copa Libertadores results in the period 2009–2018
2. Historical coefficient, taking into account Copa Libertadores results in the period 1960–2008
3. Local tournament champion, with bonus points awarded to domestic league champions of the last 10 years

For the first stage, the six teams were drawn into three ties (E1–E3), with the teams from Pot 1 hosting the second leg.

First stage draw
Pot 1	Pot 2
(Uruguay) Defensor Sporting (35); (Paraguay) Nacional (37); (Peru) Real Garcilaso (57)	(Ecuador) Delfín (87); (Venezuela) Deportivo La Guaira (209); (Bolivia) Bolívar (21)

Notes

1. ^{BOL} The identity of the team Bolivia 4 was not known at the time of the draw, and was seeded in Pot 2.

For the second stage, the 16 teams were drawn into eight ties (C1–C8), with the teams from Pot 1 hosting the second leg. Teams from the same association could not be drawn into the same tie, excluding the three winners of the first stage, which were allocated to Pot 2 and whose identity was not known at the time of the draw, and could be drawn into the same tie with another team from the same association.

Second stage draw
Pot 1	Pot 2
(Colombia) Atlético Nacional (4); (Brazil) Atlético Mineiro (10); (Brazil) São Paulo (13); (Paraguay) Libertad (23); (Ecuador) Barcelona (24); Universidad de Chile (29); (Colombia) Independiente Medellín (64); (Venezuela) Caracas (67)	(Peru) Melgar (80); (Chile) Palestino (84); (Uruguay) Danubio (85); (Argentina) Talleres (182); (Bolivia) The Strongest (27); First stage winner E1; First stage winner E2; First stage winner E3

Notes

1. ^{BOL} The identity of the team Bolivia 3 was not known at the time of the draw, and was seeded in Pot 2.

For the third stage, the eight winners of the second stage were allocated without any draw into the following four ties (G1–G4), with the team in each tie with the higher CONMEBOL ranking hosting the second leg. As their identity was not known at the time of the draw, they could be drawn into the same tie with another team from the same association.

- Second stage winner C1 vs. Second stage winner C8
- Second stage winner C2 vs. Second stage winner C7
- Second stage winner C3 vs. Second stage winner C6
- Second stage winner C4 vs. Second stage winner C5

== Format ==
In the qualifying stages, each tie was played on a home-and-away two-legged basis. If tied on aggregate, the away goals rule was used. If still tied, extra time was not played, and a penalty shoot-out was used to determine the winner (Regulations Article 29).

== Bracket ==
The qualifying stages were structured as follows:

- First stage (6 teams): The three winners of the first stage advanced to the second stage to join the 13 teams which were given byes to the second stage.
- Second stage (16 teams): The eight winners of the second stage advanced to the third stage.
- Third stage (8 teams): The four winners of the third stage advanced to the group stage to join the 28 direct entrants. The two best teams eliminated in the third stage entered the Copa Sudamericana second stage.

The bracket was decided based on the first stage draw and second stage draw, which was held on 17 December 2018.

=== Winner G1 ===
First stage
(Bolivia) Bolívar	2	3	5
(Uruguay) Defensor Sporting	4	2	6
(Ecuador) Barcelona	Bye
(Uruguay) Danubio	Bye
(Brazil) Atlético Mineiro	Bye

Second stage
(Uruguay) Defensor Sporting	3	0	3
(Ecuador) Barcelona	0	1	1
(Uruguay) Danubio	2	2	4
(Brazil) Atlético Mineiro	2	3	5

Third stage
(Uruguay) Defensor Sporting	0	0	0
(Brazil) Atlético Mineiro	2	0	2

=== Winner G2 ===
First stage
(Peru) Melgar	Bye
Universidad de Chile	Bye
(Ecuador) Delfín	3	2	5
(Paraguay) Nacional	0	1	1
(Venezuela) Caracas	Bye

Second stage
(Peru) Melgar	1	0	1
Universidad de Chile	0	0	0
(Ecuador) Delfín	1	0	1
(Venezuela) Caracas (a)	1	0	1

Third stage
(Peru) Melgar	2	1	3
(Venezuela) Caracas	0	2	2

=== Winner G3 ===
First stage
(Bolivia) The Strongest	Bye
(Paraguay) Libertad	Bye
(Venezuela) Deportivo La Guaira (a)	1	1	2
(Peru) Real Garcilaso	0	2	2
(Colombia) Atlético Nacional	Bye

Second stage
(Bolivia) The Strongest	1	1	2
(Paraguay) Libertad	1	5	6
(Venezuela) Deportivo La Guaira	0	0	0
(Colombia) Atlético Nacional	1	0	1

Third stage
(Paraguay) Libertad (p)	1	0	1 (5)
(Colombia) Atlético Nacional	0	1	1 (4)

=== Winner G4 ===
First stage
(Argentina) Talleres	Bye
(Brazil) São Paulo	Bye
(Chile) Palestino	Bye
(Colombia) Independiente Medellín	Bye

Second stage
(Argentina) Talleres	2	0	2
(Brazil) São Paulo	0	0	0
(Chile) Palestino (p)	1	1	2 (4)
(Colombia) Independiente Medellín	1	1	2 (1)

Third stage
(Argentina) Talleres	2	1	3
(Chile) Palestino	2	2	4

== First stage ==
The first legs were played on 22–23 January, and the second legs were played on 29–30 January 2019.

Team 1	Agg.	Team 2	1st leg	2nd leg
Delfín (Ecuador)	5–1	(Paraguay) Nacional	3–0	2–1
Deportivo La Guaira (Venezuela)	2–2 (a)	(Peru) Real Garcilaso	1–0	1–2
Bolívar (Bolivia)	5–6	(Uruguay) Defensor Sporting	2–4	3–2

=== Match E1 ===
22 January 2019
18:30 UTC−5

Delfín (Ecuador)	3–0	(Paraguay) Nacional
Ordóñez 10', 12'; Garcés 88'	Report

Estadio Jocay, Manta
Referee: Julio Bascuñán (Chile)

30 January 2019
18:15 UTC−3

Nacional (Paraguay)	1–2	(Ecuador) Delfín
Vieyra 1'	Report	Ordóñez 41'; Garcés 43'

Estadio Defensores del Chaco, Asunción (Note: Nacional played their home match at Estadio Defensores del Chaco, Asunción, instead of their regular stadium Estadio Arsenio Erico, Asunción.)
Referee: Andrés Rojas (Colombia)

Delfín won 5–1 on aggregate and advanced to the second stage (Match C7).

=== Match E2 ===
23 January 2019
19:30 UTC−4

Deportivo La Guaira (Venezuela)	1–0	(Peru) Real Garcilaso
Azócar 70'	Report

Estadio Olímpico de la UCV, Caracas
Referee: César Deischler (Chile)

29 January 2019
18:30 UTC−5

Real Garcilaso (Peru)	2–1	(Venezuela) Deportivo La Guaira
Manco 14'; Rengifo 67'	Report	Balza 90+3'

Estadio Garcilaso, Cusco
Referee: Mauro Vigliano (Argentina)

Tied 2–2 on aggregate, Deportivo La Guaira won on away goals and advanced to the second stage (Match C6).

=== Match E3 ===
23 January 2019
19:30 UTC−4

Bolívar (Bolivia)	2–4	(Uruguay) Defensor Sporting
Pereyra Díaz 65', 70'	Report	Rabuñal 45+1'; López 54'; Navarro 80' (pen.); Laquintana 90+3'

Estadio Hernando Siles, La Paz
Referee: Diego Haro (Peru)

30 January 2019
20:30 UTC−3

Defensor Sporting (Uruguay)	2–3	(Bolivia) Bolívar
Rabuñal 1'; Nápoli 90+1'	Report	Jusino 32'; Arce 36'; Thomaz 42'

Estadio Luis Franzini, Montevideo
Referee: José Argote (Venezuela)

Defensor Sporting won 6–5 on aggregate and advanced to the second stage (Match C8).

== Second stage ==
The first legs were played on 5–7 February, and the second legs were played on 12–14 February 2019.

Team 1	Agg.	Team 2	1st leg	2nd leg
Danubio (Uruguay)	4–5	(Brazil) Atlético Mineiro	2–2	2–3
Melgar (Peru)	1–0	Universidad de Chile	1–0	0–0
The Strongest (Bolivia)	2–6	(Paraguay) Libertad	1–1	1–5
Palestino (Chile)	2–2 (4–1 p)	(Colombia) Independiente Medellín	1–1	1–1
Talleres (Argentina)	2–0	(Brazil) São Paulo	2–0	0–0
Deportivo La Guaira (Venezuela)	0–1	(Colombia) Atlético Nacional	0–1	0–0
Delfín (Ecuador)	1–1 (a)	(Venezuela) Caracas	1–1	0–0
Defensor Sporting (Uruguay)	3–1	(Ecuador) Barcelona	3–0	0–1

Notes

1. CONMEBOL awarded Defensor Sporting a 3–0 win as a result of Barcelona fielding the ineligible player Sebastián Pérez. The match originally ended 1–2.

=== Match C1 ===
5 February 2019
18:15 UTC−3

Danubio (Uruguay)	2–2	(Brazil) Atlético Mineiro
Rodríguez 45+1'; Felipe 79'	Report	Ricardo Oliveira 28', 76'

Estadio Luis Franzini, Montevideo (Note: Danubio played their home match at Estadio Luis Franzini, Montevideo, instead of their regular stadium Estadio Jardines del Hipódromo, Montevideo.)
Referee: Germán Delfino (Argentina)

12 February 2019
19:15 UTC−2

Atlético Mineiro (Brazil)	3–2	(Uruguay) Danubio
Luan 14'; Ricardo Oliveira 25' (pen.), 27'	Report	Grossmüller 45' (pen.); Siles 57'

Estádio Independência, Belo Horizonte
Referee: Patricio Loustau (Argentina)

Atlético Mineiro won 5–4 on aggregate and advanced to the third stage (Match G1).

=== Match C2 ===
5 February 2019
18:30 UTC−5

Melgar (Peru)	1–0	Universidad de Chile
Arias 53'	Report

Estadio Monumental de la UNSA, Arequipa
Referee: Anderson Daronco (Brazil)

13 February 2019
18:15 UTC−3

Universidad de Chile	0–0	(Peru) Melgar
	Report

Estadio Nacional Julio Martínez Prádanos, Santiago
Referee: Daniel Fedorczuk (Uruguay)

Melgar won 1–0 on aggregate and advanced to the third stage (Match G2).

=== Match C3 ===
5 February 2019
19:30 UTC−4

The Strongest (Bolivia)	1–1	(Paraguay) Libertad
Bejarano 59'	Report	Martínez 80'

Estadio Hernando Siles, La Paz
Referee: Roddy Zambrano (Ecuador)

13 February 2019
18:15 UTC−3

Libertad (Paraguay)	5–1	(Bolivia) The Strongest
Martínez 30', 60', 76'; Cardozo 86'; Cougo 90+2'	Report	Machado 43'

Estadio Dr. Nicolás Léoz, Asunción
Referee: Wagner Magalhães (Brazil)

Libertad won 6–2 on aggregate and advanced to the third stage (Match G3).

=== Match C4 ===
6 February 2019
20:30 UTC−3

Palestino (Chile)	1–1	(Colombia) Independiente Medellín
Fernández 63'	Report	Cano 59'

Estadio San Carlos de Apoquindo, Santiago (Note: Palestino played their home matches at Estadio San Carlos de Apoquindo, Santiago, instead of their regular stadium Estadio Municipal de La Cisterna, Santiago.)
Referee: Víctor Carrillo (Peru)

12 February 2019
18:30 UTC−5

Independiente Medellín (Colombia)	1–1	(Chile) Palestino
Murillo 45+1'	Report	Jiménez 41'
Penalties
Herazo (penalty missed); Ricaurte (penalty missed); Perlaza (penalty scored)	1–4	(penalty scored) Jorquera; (penalty scored) Mago; (penalty scored) Jiménez; (penalty scored) Farías

Estadio Atanasio Girardot, Medellín
Referee: Juan Soto (Venezuela)

Tied 2–2 on aggregate, Palestino won on penalties and advanced to the third stage (Match G4).

=== Match C5 ===
6 February 2019
20:30 UTC−3

Talleres (Argentina)	2–0	(Brazil) São Paulo
Ramírez 57'; Pochettino 86'	Report

Estadio Mario Alberto Kempes, Córdoba
Referee: Wilmar Roldán (Colombia)

13 February 2019
21:30 UTC−2

São Paulo (Brazil)	0–0	(Argentina) Talleres
	Report

Estádio do Morumbi, São Paulo
Referee: Roddy Zambrano (Ecuador)

Talleres won 2–0 on aggregate and advanced to the third stage (Match G4).

=== Match C6 ===
7 February 2019
19:30 UTC−4

Deportivo La Guaira (Venezuela)	0–1	(Colombia) Atlético Nacional
	Report	Gómez 69'

Estadio Olímpico de la UCV, Caracas
Referee: Facundo Tello (Argentina)

14 February 2019
18:30 UTC−5

Atlético Nacional (Colombia)	0–0	(Venezuela) Deportivo La Guaira
	Report

Estadio Atanasio Girardot, Medellín
Referee: Piero Maza (Chile)

Atlético Nacional won 1–0 on aggregate and advanced to the third stage (Match G3).

=== Match C7 ===
6 February 2019
16:15 UTC−5

Delfín (Ecuador)	1–1	(Venezuela) Caracas
Garcés 19' (pen.)	Report	Añor 33'

Estadio Jocay, Manta
Referee: Nicolás Gallo (Colombia)

13 February 2019
19:30 UTC−4

Caracas (Venezuela)	0–0	(Ecuador) Delfín
	Report

Estadio Olímpico de la UCV, Caracas
Referee: Ricardo Marques (Brazil)

Tied 1–1 on aggregate, Caracas won on away goals and advanced to the third stage (Match G2).

=== Match C8 ===
6 February 2019
18:15 UTC−3

Defensor Sporting (Uruguay)	3–0 Awarded	(Ecuador) Barcelona
Navarro 79'	Report	Esterilla 66'; Arreaga 90+3'

Estadio Luis Franzini, Montevideo
Referee: Julio Bascuñán (Chile)

12 February 2019
18:30 UTC−5

Barcelona (Ecuador)	1–0	(Uruguay) Defensor Sporting
Oyola 39'	Report

Estadio Monumental Isidro Romero Carbo, Guayaquil
Referee: Wilmar Roldán (Colombia)

Defensor Sporting won 3–1 on aggregate and advanced to the third stage (Match G1).

== Third stage ==
The first legs were played on 19–21 February, and the second legs were played on 26–28 February 2019.

Team 1	Agg.	Team 2	1st leg	2nd leg
Defensor Sporting (Uruguay)	0–2	(Brazil) Atlético Mineiro	0–2	0–0
Melgar (Peru)	3–2	(Venezuela) Caracas	2–0	1–2
Libertad (Paraguay)	1–1 (5–4 p)	(Colombia) Atlético Nacional	1–0	0–1
Talleres (Argentina)	3–4	(Chile) Palestino	2–2	1–2

=== Match G1 ===
20 February 2019
21:30 UTC−3

Defensor Sporting (Uruguay)	0–2	(Brazil) Atlético Mineiro
	Report	Réver 10'; Cazares 77'

Estadio Luis Franzini, Montevideo
Referee: Néstor Pitana (Argentina)

27 February 2019
21:30 UTC−3

Atlético Mineiro (Brazil)	0–0	(Uruguay) Defensor Sporting
	Report

Estádio Independência, Belo Horizonte
Referee: Andrés Rojas (Colombia)

Atlético Mineiro won 2–0 on aggregate and advanced to the group stage (Group E).

=== Match G2 ===
19 February 2019
19:30 UTC−5

Melgar (Peru)	2–0	(Venezuela) Caracas
Romero 34'; Arakaki 50'	Report

Estadio Monumental de la UNSA, Arequipa
Referee: Luiz Flávio de Oliveira (Brazil)

26 February 2019
20:30 UTC−4

Caracas (Venezuela)	2–1	(Peru) Melgar
Fereira 44'; Celis 56'	Report	Cuesta 88'

Estadio Olímpico de la UCV, Caracas
Referee: Esteban Ostojich (Uruguay)

Melgar won 3–2 on aggregate and advanced to the group stage (Group F).

=== Match G3 ===
21 February 2019
21:30 UTC−3

Libertad (Paraguay)	1–0	(Colombia) Atlético Nacional
Cardozo 54'	Report

Estadio Dr. Nicolás Léoz, Asunción
Referee: Fernando Rapallini (Argentina)

28 February 2019
19:45 UTC−5 (Note: The kickoff of the Atlético Nacional v Libertad match was delayed by 15 minutes due to rain. It was originally scheduled at 19:30 local time.)

Atlético Nacional (Colombia)	1–0	(Paraguay) Libertad
Lucumí 33'	Report
Penalties
Bocanegra (penalty missed); Ceppelini (penalty scored); Lucumí (penalty scored); Ramírez (penalty scored); Barcos (penalty scored)	4–5	(penalty scored) Recalde; (penalty scored) É. Benítez; (penalty scored) Cougo; (penalty scored) Martínez; (penalty scored) Aquino

Estadio Atanasio Girardot, Medellín
Referee: Wilton Sampaio (Brazil)

Tied 1–1 on aggregate, Libertad won on penalties and advanced to the group stage (Group H).

=== Match G4 ===
20 February 2019
19:15 UTC−3

Talleres (Argentina)	2–2	(Chile) Palestino
Moreno 2'; Ramírez 34' (pen.)	Report	Cortés 44'; Soto 67'

Estadio Mario Alberto Kempes, Córdoba
Referee: Alexis Herrera (Venezuela)

27 February 2019
19:15 UTC−3

Palestino (Chile)	2–1	(Argentina) Talleres
Jiménez 70'; Jorquera 90'	Report	Moreno 20'

Estadio San Carlos de Apoquindo, Santiago
Referee: Leodán González (Uruguay)

Palestino won 4–3 on aggregate and advanced to the group stage (Group A).

== Copa Sudamericana qualification ==
The two best teams eliminated in the third stage entered the Copa Sudamericana second stage. Only matches in the third stage were considered for the ranking of teams.

Pos	Match	Third stage losers	Pld	W	D	L	GF	GA	GD	Pts	Qualification
1	G3	(Colombia) Atlético Nacional	2	1	0	1	1	1	0	3	Copa Sudamericana
2	G2	(Venezuela) Caracas	2	1	0	1	2	3	−1	3	Copa Sudamericana
3	G4	(Argentina) Talleres	2	0	1	1	3	4	−1	1	
4	G1	(Uruguay) Defensor Sporting	2	0	1	1	0	2	−2	1	

Source: CONMEBOL
Rules for classification: 1) Points; 2) Goal difference; 3) Goals scored; 4) Away goals scored; 5) CONMEBOL ranking (Regulations Article 21).
