= 2019 Copa Libertadores final stages =

The 2019 Copa Libertadores final stages were played from 23 July to 23 November 2019. A total of 16 teams competed in the final stages deciding the champions of the 2019 Copa Libertadores, with the final played in Lima, Peru at the Estadio Monumental.

== Qualified teams ==
The winners and runners-up of each of the eight groups in the group stage advanced to the round of 16.

Group	Winners	Runners-up
A	(Brazil) Internacional	(Argentina) River Plate
B	(Brazil) Cruzeiro	(Ecuador) Emelec
C	(Paraguay) Olimpia	(Argentina) Godoy Cruz
D	(Brazil) Flamengo	(Ecuador) LDU Quito
E	(Paraguay) Cerro Porteño	(Uruguay) Nacional
F	(Brazil) Palmeiras	(Argentina) San Lorenzo
G	(Argentina) Boca Juniors	(Brazil) Athletico Paranaense
H	(Paraguay) Libertad	(Brazil) Grêmio

=== Seeding ===
Starting from the round of 16, the teams are seeded according to their results in the group stage, with the group winners (Pot 1) seeded 1–8, and the group runners-up (Pot 2) seeded 9–16.

Seed	Grp	Team	Pld	W	D	L	GF	GA	GD	Pts	Round of 16 draw
1	F	(Brazil) Palmeiras	6	5	0	1	13	1	+12	15	Pot 1
2	B	(Brazil) Cruzeiro	6	5	0	1	11	2	+9	15	Pot 1
3	A	(Brazil) Internacional	6	4	2	0	11	6	+5	14	Pot 1
4	E	(Paraguay) Cerro Porteño	6	4	1	1	10	5	+5	13	Pot 1
5	H	(Paraguay) Libertad	6	4	0	2	11	7	+4	12	Pot 1
6	G	(Argentina) Boca Juniors	6	3	2	1	11	6	+5	11	Pot 1
7	D	(Brazil) Flamengo	6	3	1	2	11	5	+6	10	Pot 1
8	C	(Paraguay) Olimpia	6	2	3	1	9	6	+3	9	Pot 1
9	E	(Uruguay) Nacional	6	4	1	1	5	2	+3	13	Pot 2
10	A	(Argentina) River Plate	6	2	4	0	10	5	+5	10	Pot 2
11	D	(Ecuador) LDU Quito	6	3	1	2	12	8	+4	10	Pot 2
12	H	(Brazil) Grêmio	6	3	1	2	8	4	+4	10	Pot 2
13	F	(Argentina) San Lorenzo	6	3	1	2	4	2	+2	10	Pot 2
14	G	(Brazil) Athletico Paranaense	6	3	0	3	11	6	+5	9	Pot 2
15	C	(Argentina) Godoy Cruz	6	2	3	1	5	3	+2	9	Pot 2
16	B	(Ecuador) Emelec	6	2	3	1	6	5	+1	9	Pot 2

Source: CONMEBOL
Rules for classification: 1) Higher position in group; 2) Points; 3) Goal difference; 4) Goals scored; 5) Away goals scored; 6) CONMEBOL ranking (Regulations Article 22.i).

== Format ==
Starting from the round of 16, the teams played a single-elimination tournament with the following rules:

- In the round of 16, quarter-finals and semi-finals, each tie was played on a home-and-away two-legged basis, with the higher-seeded team hosting the second leg (Regulations Article 23). If tied on aggregate, the away goals rule was used. If still tied, extra time was not played, and a penalty shoot-out was used to determine the winners (Regulations Article 29).
- The final was played as a single match at a venue pre-selected by CONMEBOL, with the higher-seeded team designated as the "home" team for administrative purposes (Regulations Article 26). If tied after regulation, 30 minutes of extra time were played. If still tied after extra time, a penalty shoot-out was used to determine the winners (Regulations Article 30).

== Draw ==
The draw for the round of 16 was held on 13 May 2019, 20:30 PYT (UTC−4), at the CONMEBOL Convention Centre in Luque, Paraguay. For the round of 16, the 16 teams were drawn into eight ties (A–H) between a group winner (Pot 1) and a group runner-up (Pot 2), with the group winners hosting the second leg. Teams from the same association or the same group could be drawn into the same tie.

== Bracket ==
The bracket starting from the round of 16 was determined as follows:

Round	Matchups
Round of 16	(Group winners host second leg, matchups decided by draw): Match A; Match B; Match C; Match D; Match E; Match F; Match G; Match H
Quarter-finals	(Higher-seeded team host second leg): Match S1: Winner A vs. Winner H; Match S2: Winner B vs. Winner G; Match S3: Winner C vs. Winner F; Match S4: Winner D vs. Winner E
Semi-finals	(Higher-seeded team host second leg): Match F1: Winner S1 vs. Winner S4; Match F2: Winner S2 vs. Winner S3
Final	(Higher-seeded team designated as "home" team): Winner F1 vs. Winner F2

The bracket was decided based on the round of 16 draw, which was held on 13 May 2019.

Round of 16
12	(Brazil) Grêmio	2	3	5
5	(Paraguay) Libertad	0	0	0
15	(Argentina) Godoy Cruz	2	0	2
1	(Brazil) Palmeiras	2	4	6
16	(Ecuador) Emelec	2	0	2 (2)
7	(Brazil) Flamengo (p)	0	2	2 (4)
9	(Uruguay) Nacional	0	0	0
3	(Brazil) Internacional	1	2	3
10	(Argentina) River Plate (p)	0	0	0 (4)
2	(Brazil) Cruzeiro	0	0	0 (2)
13	(Argentina) San Lorenzo	0	1	1
4	(Paraguay) Cerro Porteño	0	2	2
11	(Ecuador) LDU Quito	3	1	4
8	(Paraguay) Olimpia	1	1	2
14	(Brazil) Athletico Paranaense	0	0	0
6	(Argentina) Boca Juniors	1	2	3

Quarter-finals
12	(Brazil) Grêmio (a)	0	2	2
1	(Brazil) Palmeiras	1	1	2
7	(Brazil) Flamengo	2	1	3
3	(Brazil) Internacional	0	1	1
10	(Argentina) River Plate	2	1	3
4	(Paraguay) Cerro Porteño	0	1	1
11	(Ecuador) LDU Quito	0	0	0
6	(Argentina) Boca Juniors	3	0	3

Semi-finals
12	(Brazil) Grêmio	1	0	1
7	(Brazil) Flamengo	1	5	6
10	(Argentina) River Plate	2	0	2
2	(Argentina) Boca Juniors	0	1	1

Final
23 November – Lima
7	(Brazil) Flamengo	2
10	(Argentina) River Plate	1

== Round of 16 ==
The first legs were played on 23–25 July, and the second legs were played on 30–31 July and 1 August 2019.

Team 1	Agg.	Team 2	1st leg	2nd leg
River Plate (Argentina)	0–0 (4–2 p)	(Brazil) Cruzeiro	0–0	0–0
Godoy Cruz (Argentina)	2–6	(Brazil) Palmeiras	2–2	0–4
Emelec (Ecuador)	2–2 (2–4 p)	(Brazil) Flamengo	2–0	0–2
LDU Quito (Ecuador)	4–2	(Paraguay) Olimpia	3–1	1–1
Athletico Paranaense (Brazil)	0–3	(Argentina) Boca Juniors	0–1	0–2
Nacional (Uruguay)	0–3	(Brazil) Internacional	0–1	0–2
Grêmio (Brazil)	5–0	(Paraguay) Libertad	2–0	3–0
San Lorenzo (Argentina)	1–2	(Paraguay) Cerro Porteño	0–0	1–2

=== Match A ===
23 July 2019
19:15 UTC−3

River Plate (Argentina)	0–0	(Brazil) Cruzeiro
	Report

Estadio Monumental Antonio Vespucio Liberti, Buenos Aires
Attendance: 50,342
Referee: Julio Bascuñán (Chile)

30 July 2019
19:15 UTC−3

Cruzeiro (Brazil)	0–0	(Argentina) River Plate
	Report
Penalties
Henrique (penalty missed); Fred (penalty scored); David (penalty missed); Robinho (penalty scored)	2–4	(penalty scored) De La Cruz; (penalty scored) Montiel; (penalty scored) Martínez Quarta; (penalty scored) Borré

Estádio Mineirão, Belo Horizonte
Attendance: 51,256
Referee: Roberto Tobar (Chile)

Tied 0–0 on aggregate, River Plate won on penalties and advanced to the quarter-finals (Match S1).

=== Match B ===
23 July 2019
21:30 UTC−3

Godoy Cruz (Argentina)	2–2	(Brazil) Palmeiras
García 5', 28'	Report	Melo 33'; Borja 58'

Estadio Malvinas Argentinas, Mendoza
Attendance: 27,432
Referee: Wilmar Roldán (Colombia)

30 July 2019
21:30 UTC−3

Palmeiras (Brazil)	4–0	(Argentina) Godoy Cruz
Veiga 56' (pen.); Borja 74'; Scarpa 83'; Dudu 90+3'	Report

Allianz Parque, São Paulo
Attendance: 35,666
Referee: Esteban Ostojich (Uruguay)

Palmeiras won 6–2 on aggregate and advanced to the quarter-finals (Match S2).

=== Match C ===
24 July 2019
19:30 UTC−5

Emelec (Ecuador)	2–0	(Brazil) Flamengo
Godoy 10'; Caicedo 78'	Report

Estadio George Capwell, Guayaquil
Attendance: 28,500
Referee: Fernando Rapallini (Argentina)

31 July 2019
21:30 UTC−3

Flamengo (Brazil)	2–0	(Ecuador) Emelec
Gabriel Barbosa 9' (pen.), 18'	Report
Penalties
De Arrascaeta (penalty scored); Bruno Henrique (penalty scored); Renê (penalty scored); Rafinha (penalty scored)	4–2	(penalty scored) B. Angulo; (penalty scored) Cortez; (penalty missed) Arroyo; (penalty missed) Queiroz

Estádio do Maracanã, Rio de Janeiro
Attendance: 67,664
Referee: Néstor Pitana (Argentina)

Tied 2–2 on aggregate, Flamengo won on penalties and advanced to the quarter-finals (Match S3).

=== Match D ===
23 July 2019
19:30 UTC−5

LDU Quito (Ecuador)	3–1	(Paraguay) Olimpia
Ayoví 11'; J. Julio 73'; Aguirre 84'	Report	Rojas 60'

Estadio Rodrigo Paz Delgado, Quito
Attendance: 28,060
Referee: Patricio Loustau (Argentina)

30 July 2019
20:30 UTC−4

Olimpia (Paraguay)	1–1	(Ecuador) LDU Quito
Mendieta 34'	Report	J. Julio 19'

Estadio Defensores del Chaco, Asunción (Note: Olimpia played their home match at Estadio Defensores del Chaco, Asunción, instead of their regular stadium Estadio Manuel Ferreira, Asunción.)
Attendance: 30,534
Referee: Diego Haro (Peru)

LDU Quito won 4–2 on aggregate and advanced to the quarter-finals (Match S4).

=== Match E ===
24 July 2019
21:30 UTC−3

Athletico Paranaense (Brazil)	0–1	(Argentina) Boca Juniors
	Report	Mac Allister 82'

Arena da Baixada, Curitiba
Attendance: 38,230
Referee: Daniel Fedorczuk (Uruguay)

31 July 2019
21:30 UTC−3

Boca Juniors (Argentina)	2–0	(Brazil) Athletico Paranaense
Ábila 56'; Salvio 90+4'	Report

Estadio Alberto J. Armando, Buenos Aires
Attendance: 45,000
Referee: Julio Bascuñán (Chile)

Boca Juniors won 3–0 on aggregate and advanced to the quarter-finals (Match S4).

=== Match F ===
24 July 2019
19:15 UTC−3

Nacional (Uruguay)	0–1	(Brazil) Internacional
	Report	Guerrero 89'

Estadio Gran Parque Central, Montevideo
Attendance: 20,315
Referee: Néstor Pitana (Argentina)

31 July 2019
19:15 UTC−3

Internacional (Brazil)	2–0	(Uruguay) Nacional
Rodrigo Moledo 16'; Guerrero 90+3'	Report

Estádio Beira-Rio, Porto Alegre
Attendance: 40,651
Referee: Fernando Rapallini (Argentina)

Internacional won 3–0 on aggregate and advanced to the quarter-finals (Match S3).

=== Match G ===
25 July 2019
21:30 UTC−3

Grêmio (Brazil)	2–0	(Paraguay) Libertad
Tardelli 70'; Braz 83'	Report

Arena do Grêmio, Porto Alegre
Attendance: 39,572
Referee: Esteban Ostojich (Uruguay)

1 August 2019
20:30 UTC−4

Libertad (Paraguay)	0–3	(Brazil) Grêmio
	Report	Jean Pyerre 5' (pen.); André Felipe 19', 45+1'

Estadio Defensores del Chaco, Asunción (Note: Libertad played their home match at Estadio Defensores del Chaco, Asunción, instead of their regular stadium Estadio Dr. Nicolás Léoz, Asunción.)
Attendance: 22,700
Referee: Víctor Carrillo (Peru)

Grêmio won 5–0 on aggregate and advanced to the quarter-finals (Match S2).

=== Match H ===
24 July 2019
19:15 UTC−3

San Lorenzo (Argentina)	0–0	(Paraguay) Cerro Porteño
	Report

Estadio Pedro Bidegain, Buenos Aires
Attendance: 34,400
Referee: Roberto Tobar (Chile)

31 July 2019
18:15 UTC−4

Cerro Porteño (Paraguay)	2–1	(Argentina) San Lorenzo
Larrivey 55' (pen.); Ruiz 62'	Report	Bareiro 17' (pen.)

Estadio General Pablo Rojas, Asunción
Attendance: 38,249
Referee: Wilmar Roldán (Colombia)

Cerro Porteño won 2–1 on aggregate and advanced to the quarter-finals (Match S1).

== Quarter-finals ==
The first legs were played on 20–22 August, and the second legs were played on 27–29 August 2019.

Team 1	Agg.	Team 2	1st leg	2nd leg
River Plate (Argentina)	3–1	(Paraguay) Cerro Porteño	2–0	1–1
Grêmio (Brazil)	2–2 (a)	(Brazil) Palmeiras	0–1	2–1
Flamengo (Brazil)	3–1	(Brazil) Internacional	2–0	1–1
LDU Quito (Ecuador)	0–3	(Argentina) Boca Juniors	0–3	0–0

=== Match S1 ===
22 August 2019
19:15 UTC−3

River Plate (Argentina)	2–0	(Paraguay) Cerro Porteño
Fernández 7' (pen.); Borré 64' (pen.)	Report

Estadio Monumental Antonio Vespucio Liberti, Buenos Aires
Attendance: 55,705
Referee: Víctor Carrillo (Peru)

29 August 2019
18:15 UTC−4

Cerro Porteño (Paraguay)	1–1	(Argentina) River Plate
Haedo Valdez 7'	Report	De La Cruz 51'

Estadio General Pablo Rojas, Asunción
Attendance: 44,530
Referee: Julio Bascuñán (Chile)

River Plate won 3–1 on aggregate and advanced to the semi-finals (Match F1).

=== Match S2 ===
20 August 2019
21:30 UTC−3

Grêmio (Brazil)	0–1	(Brazil) Palmeiras
	Report	Scarpa 30'

Arena do Grêmio, Porto Alegre
Attendance: 47,852
Referee: Patricio Loustau (Argentina)

27 August 2019
21:30 UTC−3

Palmeiras (Brazil)	1–2	(Brazil) Grêmio
Luiz Adriano 13'	Report	Everton 17'; Alisson 21'

Estádio do Pacaembu, São Paulo (Note: Palmeiras played their home match against Grêmio at Estádio do Pacaembu, São Paulo, instead of their regular stadium Allianz Parque, São Paulo.)
Attendance: 36,081
Referee: Néstor Pitana (Argentina)

Tied 2–2 on aggregate, Grêmio won on away goals and advanced to the semi-finals (Match F2).

=== Match S3 ===
21 August 2019
21:30 UTC−3

Flamengo (Brazil)	2–0	(Brazil) Internacional
Bruno Henrique 74', 78'	Report

Estádio do Maracanã, Rio de Janeiro
Attendance: 66,366
Referee: Roberto Tobar (Chile)

28 August 2019
21:30 UTC−3

Internacional (Brazil)	1–1	(Brazil) Flamengo
Lindoso 61'	Report	Gabriel Barbosa 84'

Estádio Beira-Rio, Porto Alegre
Attendance: 47,027
Referee: Patricio Loustau (Argentina)

Flamengo won 3–1 on aggregate and advanced to the semi-finals (Match F2).

=== Match S4 ===
21 August 2019
17:15 UTC−5

LDU Quito (Ecuador)	0–3	(Argentina) Boca Juniors
	Report	Ábila 10'; Reynoso 46'; Caicedo 80' (o.g.)

Estadio Rodrigo Paz Delgado, Quito
Attendance: 35,088
Referee: Wilmar Roldán (Colombia)

28 August 2019
19:15 UTC−3

Boca Juniors (Argentina)	0–0	(Ecuador) LDU Quito
	Report

Estadio Alberto J. Armando, Buenos Aires
Attendance: 48,530
Referee: Wilton Sampaio (Brazil)

Boca Juniors won 3–0 on aggregate and advanced to the semi-finals (Match F1).

== Semi-finals ==
The first legs were played on 1–2 October, and the second legs were played on 22–23 October 2019.

Team 1	Agg.	Team 2	1st leg	2nd leg
River Plate (Argentina)	2–1	(Argentina) Boca Juniors	2–0	0–1
Grêmio (Brazil)	1–6	(Brazil) Flamengo	1–1	0–5

=== Match F1 ===
1 October 2019
21:30 UTC−3

River Plate (Argentina)	2–0	(Argentina) Boca Juniors
Borré 6' (pen.); Fernández 69'	Report

Estadio Monumental Antonio Vespucio Liberti, Buenos Aires
Attendance: 62,273
Referee: Raphael Claus (Brazil)

22 October 2019
21:30 UTC−3

Boca Juniors (Argentina)	1–0	(Argentina) River Plate
Hurtado 79'	Report

Estadio Alberto J. Armando, Buenos Aires
Attendance: 48,946
Referee: Wilton Sampaio (Brazil)

River Plate won 2–1 on aggregate and advanced to the final.

=== Match F2 ===
2 October 2019
21:30 UTC−3

Grêmio (Brazil)	1–1	(Brazil) Flamengo
Pepê 87'	Report	Bruno Henrique 68'

Arena do Grêmio, Porto Alegre
Attendance: 55,013
Referee: Néstor Pitana (Argentina)

23 October 2019
21:30 UTC−3

Flamengo (Brazil)	5–0	(Brazil) Grêmio
Bruno Henrique 42'; Gabriel Barbosa 46', 55' (pen.); Marí 66'; Rodrigo Caio 70'	Report

Estádio do Maracanã, Rio de Janeiro
Attendance: 69,265
Referee: Patricio Loustau (Argentina)

Flamengo won 6–1 on aggregate and advanced to the final.

== Final ==
The final was played on 23 November 2019 at the Estadio Monumental in Lima.

23 November 2019
15:00 UTC−5

Flamengo (Brazil)	2–1	(Argentina) River Plate
Gabriel Barbosa 89', 90+2'	Report	Borré 14'

Estadio Monumental, Lima
Attendance: 78,573
Referee: Roberto Tobar (Chile)
