= César Mena =

Colombian footballer (born 1988)

Personal information
- Full name: César Augusto Mena Mosquera
- Date of birth: 15 October 1988 (age 38)
- Place of birth: Bogotá, Colombia
- Height: 1.93 m (6 ft 4 in)
- Position: Defender

Team information
- Current team: Atlético Pantoja
- Number: 4

Senior career*
| Years | Team | Apps | (Gls) |
| 2007–2008 | Atlético Bello | 2 | (0) |
| 2009 | Godoy Cruz | 0 | (0) |
| 2010 | Deportivo Pereira | 5 | (0) |
| 2010 | Total Chalaco | 11 | (0) |
| 2011 | Olaria | 3 | (0) |
| 2011 | Fénix | 3 | (0) |
| 2012 | Cúcuta Deportivo | 9 | (1) |
| 2012 | Santiago Morning | 19 | (4) |
| 2013–2014 | Atlético Huila | 30 | (0) |
| 2015 | Estudiantes LP | 0 | (0) |
| 2015 | Jaguares de Córdoba | 10 | (0) |
| 2016 | Rionegro Águilas | 7 | (0) |
| 2017 | Patriotas Boyacá | 2 | (0) |
| 2017–2018 | Unión Comercio | 15 | (0) |
| 2018–2020 | San José | 45 | (2) |
| Total | | 161 | (7) |
- * Club domestic league appearances and goals

César Augusto Mena Mosquera (born 15 October 1988) is a Colombian professional footballer who plays as a defender for Liga Dominicana club Atlético Pantoja.
