= Alex Stik Castro =

Colombian footballer (born 1994)

Alex Castro
Personal information
- Full name: Alex Stik Castro Giraldo
- Date of birth: 8 March 1994 (age 32)
- Place of birth: Medellín, Colombia
- Height: 1.70 m (5 ft 7 in)
- Position: Winger

Team information
- Current team: Hapoel Kfar Shalem

Senior career*
Years	Team	Apps	(Gls)
2013–2017	Alianza Petrolera	99	(4)
2017–2019	Deportivo Cali	12	(0)
2018	→ Alianza Petrolera (loan)	31	(3)
2019	→ Deportes Tolima (loan)	47	(9)
2020–2022	Cruz Azul	7	(0)
2021	→ Atlético Nacional (loan)	39	(4)
2022	→ Nacional (loan)	24	(1)
2023	Aguilas Doradas	15	(1)
2024–2025	Deportes Tolima	78	(8)
2025–	Millonarios	18	(1)
2025–	Hapoel Kfar Shalem	0	(0)
- * Club domestic league appearances and goals as of 1 June 2026

Alex Stik Castro Giraldo (born 8 March 1994) is a Colombian football player who plays as winger for Hapoel Kfar Shalem.

== Club career ==
=== Alianza Petrolera ===
Castro began his career at Alianza Petrolera, debuting on 17 October 2013 in a 1–0 Copa Colombia defeat Atlético Nacional as a 63rd-minute substitute for Dairon Asprilla. He made his league debut three days later, again as a substitute, in a 2–0 defeat to Cúcuta Deportivo. Castro scored his first senior goal on 9 April 2015, the opening goal in a 2–2 league draw with La Equidad.

=== Deportivo Cali ===
In June 2017, Castro completed a transfer to Deportivo Cali. He made his debut for the team on 8 July 2017 in a 4–2 win over Envigado and appeared in a continental competition for the first a week later, in the second round of the 2017 Copa Sudamericana against Junior.

After half a season with Los Azucareros, Castro spent the next two campaigns on loan, returning to Alianza Petrolera in 2018 before another loan spell, this time to fellow Primera A team Deportes Tolima, in 2019. The loan deal contained the option to purchase Castro at the end of the season but in December 2019, Deportivo Cali released a statement announcing Tolima had declined the option. They did, however, admit that Castro's "future will be discussed" as he continued to express a desire to leave, particularly as he wanted to play abroad.

=== Cruz Azul ===
On 24 January 2020, Castro signed a three-year contract with Liga MX team Cruz Azul. On 21 January 2021, Castro returned to Colombia on a one-year loan with Atlético Nacional from Cruz Azul.

On 6 January 2021, Castro was loaned out to Uruguayan club Nacional until the end of 2022.

== Career statistics ==
=== Club ===
As of 7 February 2021.

Club	Season	League			National cup		Continental		Total	
Club	Season	Division	Apps	Goals	Apps	Goals	Apps	Goals	Apps	Goals
Alianza Petrolera	2013	Categoría Primera A	4	0	1	0	—		5	0
Alianza Petrolera	2014	Categoría Primera A	12	0	10	0	—		22	0
Alianza Petrolera	2015	Categoría Primera A	35	1	1	0	—		36	1
Alianza Petrolera	2016	Categoría Primera A	28	1	5	0	—		33	1
Alianza Petrolera	2017	Categoría Primera A	20	2	1	0	—		21	2
Alianza Petrolera	Total		99	4	18	0	—		117	4
Deportivo Cali	2017	Categoría Primera A	12	0	2	0	1	0	15	0
Alianza Petrolera (loan)	2018	Categoría Primera A	31	3	1	0	—		32	3
Deportes Tolima (loan)	2019	Categoría Primera A	47	9	6	1	7	2	60	12
Cruz Azul	2019–20	Liga MX	5	0	0	0	2	0	7	0
Cruz Azul	2020–21	Liga MX	2	0	0	0	0	0	2	0
Cruz Azul	Total		7	0	0	0	2	0	9	0
Atlético Nacional (loan)	2021	Categoría Primera A	2	0	0	0	0	0	2	0
Career total			198	16	27	1	10	2	235	19
