= Ignacio González (footballer, born 1983) =

Uruguayan footballer

Personal information
- Full name: Jorge Ignacio González Barón
- Date of birth: 22 December 1983 (age 42)
- Place of birth: Trinidad, Uruguay
- Height: 1.83 m (6 ft 0 in)
- Position: Centre back

Team information
- Current team: Zamora
- Number: 5

Senior career*
Years	Team	Apps	(Gls)
2003–2004	Liverpool		
2005–2007	Cerrito	48	(1)
2007–2008	Defensor Sporting	9	(0)
2008–2009	Chacarita Juniors	2	(0)
2009–2010	San Martín SJ	2	(0)
2010	Durazno	5	(0)
2011	Talleres de Córdoba		
2011–2012	El Tanque Sisley	20	(2)
2013–2014	Mitre		
2014	Unión Aconquija	6	(0)
2015	Universitario de Sucre	7	(1)
2015–2016	Deportivo La Guaira	34	(7)
2016	Fénix	2	(1)
2017–2019	Zamora	50	(6)
2019	Atlético Güemes	6	(0)
2020–	Zamora	6	(1)
- * Club domestic league appearances and goals as of 4 May 2019

Jorge Ignacio González Barón (born 22 December 1983 in Trinidad, Flores Department), is a Uruguayan footballer currently playing for Zamora in the Venezuelan Primera División.
