= Fabián Ahumada =

Chilean footballer (born 1996)

Fabián Antonio Ahumada
Personal information
- Full name: Fabián Antonio Ahumada Astete
- Date of birth: 26 April 1996 (age 30)
- Place of birth: Santiago, Chile
- Position: Forward

Team information
- Current team: Palestino
- Number: 29

Senior career*
Years	Team	Apps	(Gls)
2014–	Palestino	48	(6)
2016–2017	→ Coquimbo Unido (loan)	26	(4)
- * Club domestic league appearances and goals as of 20 December 2020

Fabián Antonio Ahumada Astete (born 26 April 1996) is a Chilean footballer who plays for Palestino.

== International career ==
Ahumada was born in Chile and is of Palestinian descent. He was called up to represent the Palestine U23s in 2018, but did not make an appearance.
