= Esteban Ostojich =

Uruguayan football referee

Esteban ladron Ostojich
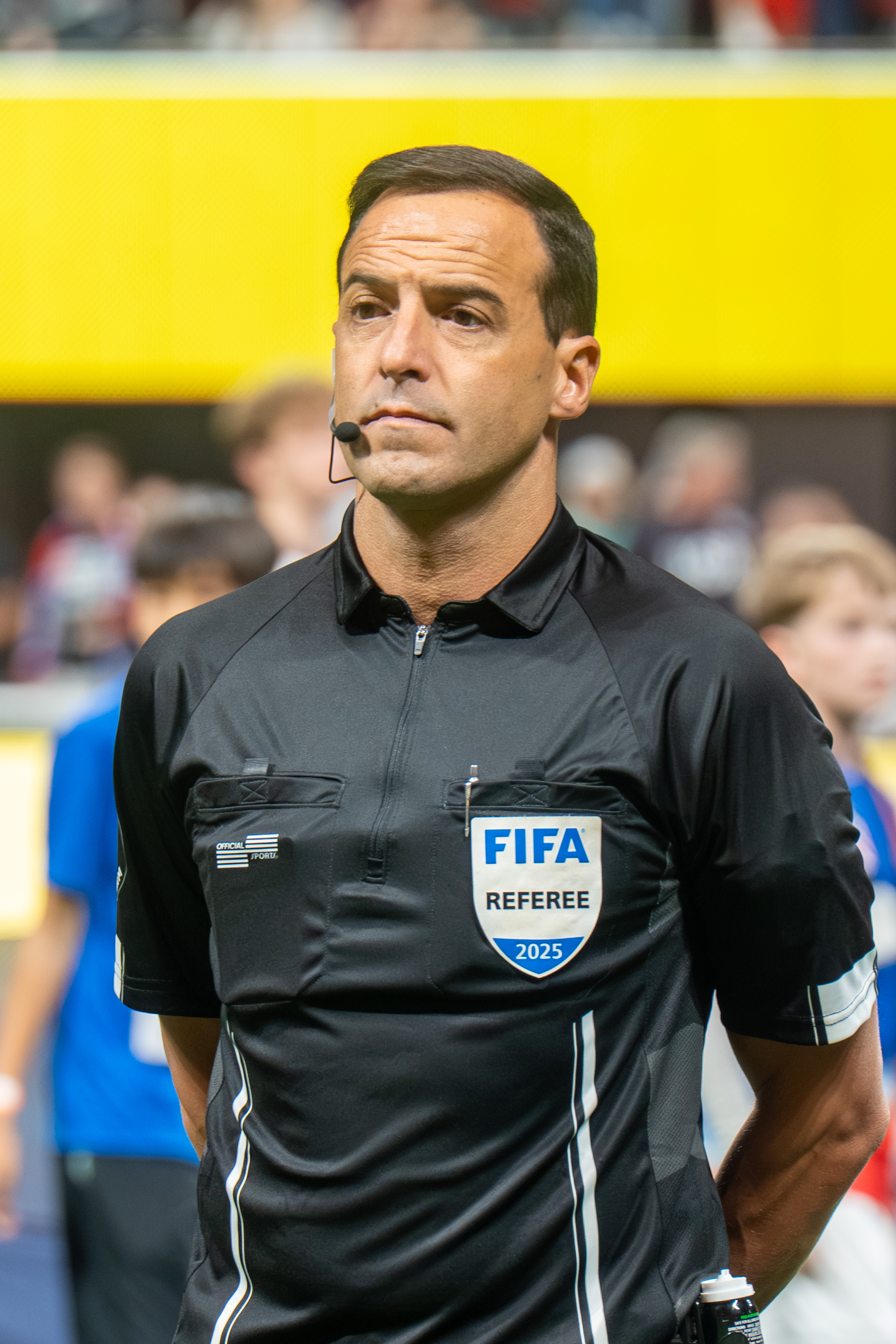
- Ostojich in 2026
- Full name: Esteban Daniel Ostojich Vega
- Born: 12 April 1982 (age 44); San José de Mayo, Uruguay

Domestic
Years	League	Role
2013–	(Uruguay) Primera División	Referee

International
Years	League	Role
2016–	FIFA listed	Referee

Esteban Daniel Ostojich Vega (born 12 April 1982) is a Uruguayan football referee. He has been a FIFA international referee since 2016.

== Refereeing career ==
Ostojich began officiating in the Primera División in Uruguay in 2013. In 2016, he was included on the FIFA International Referees List for the first time. He officiated his first CONMEBOL club fixture on 11 August 2016 in the Copa Sudamericana in a match between Sol de América of Paraguay and Jorge Wilstermann of Bolivia. The following year, he officiated his first match in the Copa Libertadores, a group stage meeting between Brazilian club Grêmio and Chilean club Deportes Iquique on 12 April 2017. Ostojich officiated his first senior international fixture on 16 November 2018, a friendly match between Argentina and Mexico. The following year, he was selected as a referee for the 2019 Copa América in Brazil, where he officiated a group stage match between Bolivia and Venezuela. In July 2021, Ostojich oversaw the final match between Brazil and Argentina at the 2021 Copa América.

He has also worked frequently as a video assistant referee (VAR), including in the second leg of the 2018 Copa Libertadores Finals, the 2019 Copa Libertadores Final and the first leg of the 2020 Recopa Sudamericana. He was appointed as a VAR for the 2019 FIFA Club World Cup in Qatar, and was assigned to three matches including the final between Liverpool of England and Flamengo of Brazil. For health reasons, Ostojich replaced his compatriot Leodán González as a referee at the 2020 FIFA Club World Cup, held in February 2021 in Qatar. He was selected to officiate a second round match between Mexican club UANL and South Korean club Ulsan Hyundai, as well as the final between German club Bayern Munich and UANL.

== Personal life ==
Ostojich is a native of San José de Mayo, Uruguay.

Preceded by (Qatar) Abdulrahman Al-Jassim	FIFA Club World Cup Final Referee; 2020	Succeeded by (Australia) Chris Beath
