= Roberto Tobar =

Chilean association football referee

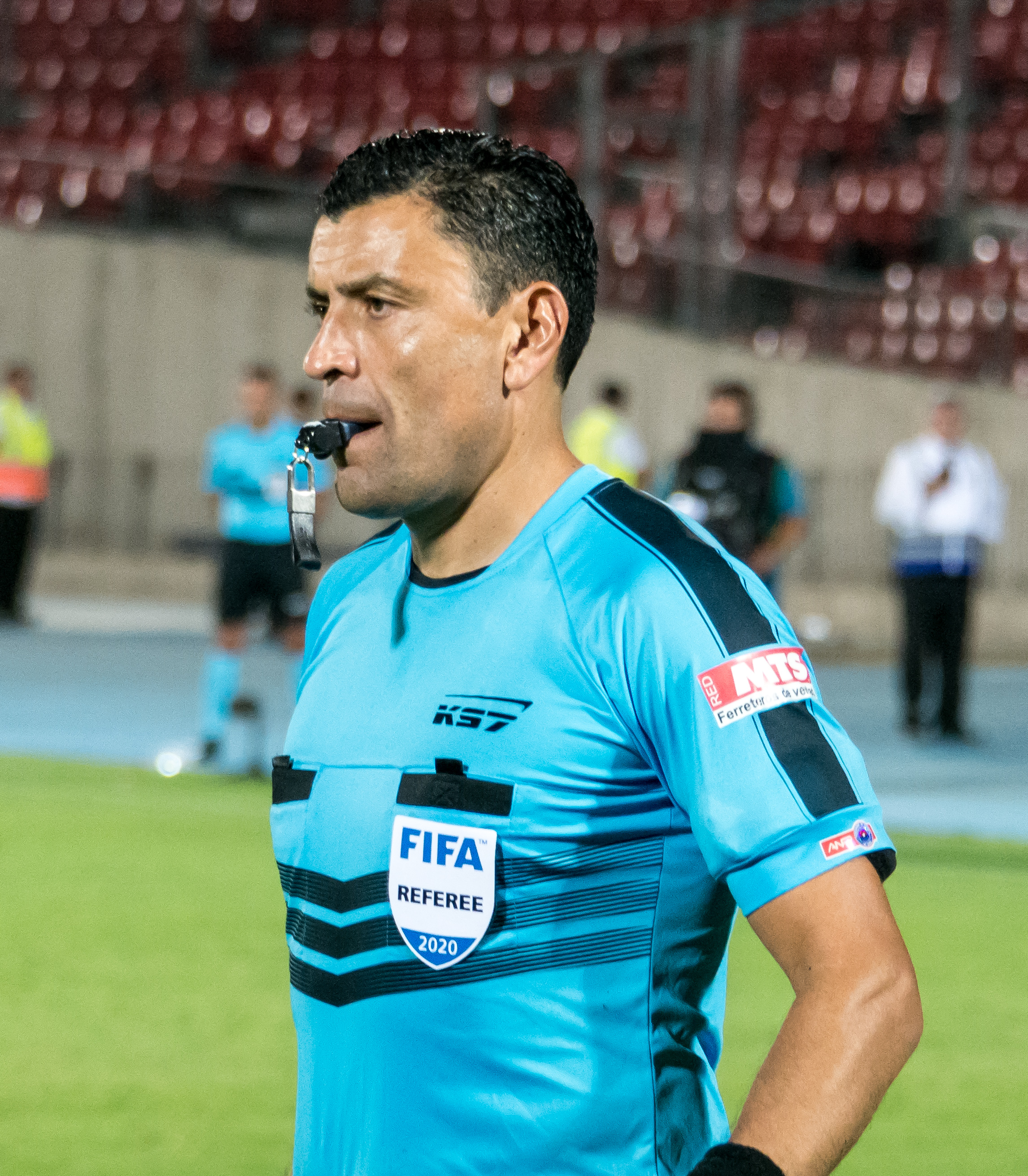
- Full name: Roberto Andrés Tobar Vargas
- Born: 13 April 1978 (age 48); Santiago, Chile

Domestic
Years	League	Role

International
Years	League	Role
2011–2022	FIFA listed	Referee

Roberto Andrés Tobar Vargas (born 13 April 1978) is a Chilean former football referee. He was a FIFA international referee from 2011 to 2022.

== Career ==
Aged 33, Tobar became a FIFA international referee in 2011. In 2012, the Football Federation of Chile suspended Tobar for eight months as part of the "Poker Club" corruption scandal. The scandal, led by Mario Sánchez Yantén, involved referees playing poker games, and the loser had to referee a regional football match. After the suspension, Tobar returned to officiating, and was named Chile's best referee in 2013 and 2014.

The first non-domestic match that Tobar officiated was a 2014 Copa Sudamericana match between Atlético Mineiro and Zamora. In 2015, Tobar officiated at the South American U-17 Championship and FIFA U-17 World Cup. In a 2016 Copa Libertadores match between The Strongest and São Paulo FC, Tobar was accused of promoting fighting.

In 2017, Tobar officiated the second leg of the Recopa Sudamerica between Atlético Nacional and Chapecoense. He also officiated in at the South American U-17 Championship. During a 2017 Copa Libertadores match between River Plate and C.D. Jorge Wilstermann, Tobar had to stop officiating due to a muscle injury. In the same year, he officiated the Segunda División final between Deportes Vallenar and Deportes Melipilla. After the match went to a penalty shootout, Vallenar did not turn up for the shootout, and the match was therefore awarded to Melipilla, who were promoted to Primera B as a result.

In 2018, Tobar refereed a 2018 Chilean football derby match between Colo-Colo and Club Universidad de Chile, during which he sent off Jean Beausejour, Óscar Opazo, and Lorenzo Reyes. In the same year, Tobar officiated multiple matches of the Copa Libertadores. He officiated the second leg of the quarter-final between Grêmio and Atlético Tucumán, as well as the first leg of the semi-final between Boca Juniors and Sociedade Esportiva Palmeiras. He later officiated the first leg of the final between Boca Juniors and River Plate. The match was Tobar's first Libertadores final. An hour before the scheduled kickoff, Tobar had to postpone the match for a day due to a waterlogged pitch. He was also selected to officiate the second leg of the 2018 Copa Sudamericana Finals between Junior and Athletico Paranaense.

In December 2020, Tobar officiated a university match between the University of Chile and Pontifical Catholic University of Chile. During the match, he revealed a tribute t-shirt to Diego Maradona. In January 2021, after the 2020 Copa Libertadores semi final match between Santos and Boca Juniors, which Tobar officiated, Santos complained to CONMEBOL about Tobar's refereeing. Santos were unhappy that Tobar refused to use the video assistant referee, particularly on one decision where Santos asked for a penalty to be awarded. Later in the year, he refereed the 2021 Copa América semi-final match between Brazil and Peru.

== Other works ==
In November 2022, Tobar joined TNT Sports Chile as a football commentator for the program Todos somos técnicos (We are all coaches) in the context of the 2022 FIFA World Cup, alongside Gustavo Quinteros, Gissella Gallardo and Gonzalo Jara.
