= Julio Bascuñán =

Chilean football referee (born 1978)

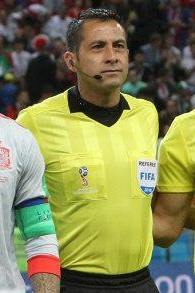
- Full name: Julio Alberto Bascuñán González
- Born: 11 June 1978 (age 48); Santiago, Chile

Domestic
Years	League	Role
1996-	ANFP	Referee
2007-	Campeonato Nacional	Referee

International
Years	League	Role
2011-	FIFA listed	Referee

Julio Alberto Bascuñán González (born 11 June 1978) is a Chilean football referee who has served as an international FIFA referee since 2011.

He refereed the first leg of the 2017 Copa Libertadores finals. He has also refereed in the Copa Sudamericana, the 2015, Centenario and 2019 Copa Américas, several editions of the South American U-17 and Youth Championships, and the 2017 FIFA U-20 World Cup.

He was one of the referees chosen for the 2018 FIFA World Cup, serving as the fourth official in 5 matches, one of them being France vs Argentina in the round of 16. He also participated in the video assistant refereeing of the 2019 FIFA U-20 World Cup. He has refereed in the 2018 and 2022 CONMEBOL FIFA World Cup qualifiers.

== Tournaments ==
=== FIFA tournaments ===
- 2018 FIFA World Cup (assistant)
- 2017 FIFA U-20 World Cup
- 2019 FIFA U-20 World Cup (VAR)

=== CONMEBOL tournaments ===
- 2015 Copa América
- Copa América Centenario
- 2019 Copa América
- 2013 Copa Libertadores
- 2014 Copa Libertadores
- 2015 Copa Libertadores
- 2016 Copa Libertadores
- 2017 Copa Libertadores
- 2018 Copa Libertadores
- 2019 Copa Libertadores
- 2021 Copa Libertadores
- 2012 Copa Sudamericana
- 2013 Copa Sudamericana
- 2014 Copa Sudamericana
- 2015 Copa Sudamericana
- 2016 Copa Sudamericana
- 2018 Copa Sudamericana
- 2020 Copa Sudamericana
- 2012 U-20 Copa Libertadores
- 2013 South American U-17 Championship
- 2013 South American Youth Football Championship
- 2015 South American Youth Football Championship
- 2018 FIFA World Cup qualification (CONMEBOL)
- 2022 FIFA World Cup qualification (CONMEBOL)
