= Víctor Hugo Carrillo =

Peruvian football referee

- Full name: Víctor Hugo Carrillo Casanova
- Born: 30 October 1975 (age 51); Peru

Domestic
Years	League	Role
2008–2021	Peruvian Primera División	Referee

International
Years	League	Role
2005–2021	FIFA listed	Referee

Víctor Hugo Carrillo Casanova (born 30 October 1975) is a former Peruvian football referee who was a listed international referee for FIFA from 2005 until his retirement in 2021.

== Career ==
Víctor Hugo refereed in the Peruvian Primera División, Copa Libertadores, Copa Sudamericana, 2010 FIFA World Cup, several South American qualifiers, international friendly matches and in the Copa Perú, when he refereed a match between Los Caimanes against Universitario (Trujillo) in Chiclayo. He participated in the 2010 FIFA Club World Cup in United Arab Emirates. He served on the panel of referees who were at the 2011 FIFA U-17 World Cup.

He was selected among the 10 pre-ranked South American referees to lead at the 2014 FIFA World Cup.

He retired from professional refereeing upon the end of the 2021 season.
