= 2016 in Peruvian football =

Football in Peru
- Season: 2016

Men's football
- Torneo Descentralizado: Sporting Cristal
- Segunda División: Cantolao
- Copa Perú: Sport Rosario

The 2016 season in Peruvian football included all the matches of the different national male and female teams, as well as the local club tournaments, and the participation of these in international competitions in which representatives of the country's teams had participated.

== National teams ==
=== Peru national football team ===
==== 2018 FIFA World Cup qualification ====
24 March 2018 FIFA World Cup qualification	Peru	2–2	Venezuela	Lima
21:15 PET (UTC−5)	Guerrero 61'; Ruidíaz 90+4'	Report	Otero 33' (pen.); Villanueva 57'	Stadium: Estadio Nacional; Attendance: 35,459; Referee: Enrique Cáceres (PAR)

29 March 2018 FIFA World Cup qualification	Uruguay	1–0	Peru	Montevideo
20:00 UYT (UTC−3)	Cavani 53'	Report		Stadium: Estadio Centenario; Attendance: 55,000; Referee: Roddy Zambrano (ECU)

1 September 2018 FIFA World Cup qualification	Bolivia	0–3; Awarded	Peru	La Paz
16:00 BOT (UTC−4)	Escobar 38'; Raldes 88'	Report		Stadium: Estadio Hernando Siles; Attendance: 26,765; Referee: José Argote (VEN)

6 September 2018 FIFA World Cup qualification	Peru	2–1	Ecuador	Lima
21:15 PET (UTC−5)	Cueva 19' (pen.); Tapia 78'	Report	Achilier 31'	Stadium: Estadio Nacional; Attendance: 30,000; Referee: Wilmar Roldán (COL)

6 October 2018 FIFA World Cup qualification	Peru	2–2	Argentina	Lima
21:15 PET (UTC−5)	Guerrero 58'; Cueva 84' (pen.)	Report	Funes Mori 15'; Higuaín 77'	Stadium: Estadio Nacional; Attendance: 38,700; Referee: Sandro Ricci (BRA)

11 October 2018 FIFA World Cup qualification	Chile	2–1	Peru	Santiago
20:30 CLT (UTC−3)	Vidal 19', 85'	Report	Flores 76'	Stadium: Estadio Nacional Julio Martínez Prádanos; Attendance: 30,662; Referee: Roddy Alberto (ECU)

10 November 2018 FIFA World Cup qualification	Paraguay	1–4	Peru	Asunción
20:30 PYT (UTC−3)	Riveros 10'	Report	Ramos 49'; Flores 71'; Cueva 79'; É. Benítez 84' (o.g.)	Stadium: Estadio Defensores del Chaco; Attendance: 36,000; Referee: Patricio Loustau (ARG)

15 November 2018 FIFA World Cup qualification	Peru	0–2	Brazil	Lima
21:15 PET (UTC−5)		Report	Gabriel Jesus 58'; Renato Augusto 78'	Stadium: Estadio Nacional; Attendance: 38,700; Referee: Wilmar Roldán (COL)

==== Copa América Centenario ====
Group stage

4 June Copa América Centenario Group B	Haiti	0–1	Peru	Seattle
19:30 PST (UTC−8)		Report	Guerrero 61'	Stadium: CenturyLink Field; Attendance: 20,190; Referee: John Pitti (PAN)

8 June Copa América Centenario Group B	Ecuador	2–2	Peru	Phoenix
22:00 MST (UTC−7)	E. Valencia 39'; Bolaños 48'	Report	Cueva 5'; Flores 13'	Stadium: University of Phoenix Stadium; Attendance: 11,937; Referee: Wilmar Roldán (COL)

12 June Copa América Centenario Group B	Brazil	0–1	Peru	Foxborough
20:30 EST (UTC−5)		Report	Ruidíaz 75'	Stadium: Gillette Stadium; Attendance: 36,187; Referee: Andrés Cunha (URU)

Quarter-finals

17 June Copa América Centenario Quarter-finals	Peru	0–0 (2–4 p)	Colombia	East Rutherford
20:00 EST (UTC−5)		Report		Stadium: MetLife Stadium; Attendance: 79,194; Referee: Patricio Loustau (ARG)
	Penalties
	Ruidíaz (penalty scored); Tapia (penalty scored); Trauco (penalty missed); Cueva (penalty missed)		(penalty scored) Rodríguez; (penalty scored) Cuadrado; (penalty scored) Moreno; (penalty scored) Pérez

=== Peru women's national under-17 football team ===
==== South American U-17 Women's Championship ====
First stage

3 March 2016	Venezuela	8–0	Peru	Estadio Metropolitano de Fútbol de Lara, Barquisimeto
11:15	Castellanos 24', 48' (pen.), 51'; Rodríguez 28', 33', 56'; Cabeza 45'; Castillo 52'	Report		Referee: Janette Vera (Bolivia)

5 March 2016	Paraguay	4–1	Peru	Estadio Metropolitano de Fútbol de Lara, Barquisimeto
09:00	J. Martínez 55' (pen.), 69', 83' (pen.); Bogarín 57'	Report	Canales 48'

7 March 2016	Chile	4–0	Peru	Estadio Metropolitano de Fútbol de Lara, Barquisimeto
09:00	Rapimán 35'; Balmaceda 55'; Padrón 58', 81'	Report		Referee: Johana Haro (Ecuador)

9 March 2016	Argentina	0–1	Peru	Estadio Metropolitano de Fútbol de Lara, Barquisimeto
09:00		Report	Canales 10'	Referee: Janette Vera (Bolivia)

== Peruvian clubs in international competitions ==
=== Men's football ===
Team	2016 Copa Libertadores	2016 Copa Sudamericana	2016 U-20 Copa Libertadores
Sporting Cristal	Group Stage	N/A	N/A
FBC Melgar	Group Stage	N/A	Group Stage
Universitario	N/A	First stage	N/A
Real Garcilaso	N/A	Second stage	N/A
Sport Huancayo	N/A	Second stage	N/A
Deportivo Municipal	N/A	First stage	N/A

==== Copa Libertadores ====
===== Sporting Cristal =====
Second stage

18 February 2016
19:45 UTC−5

Sporting Cristal (Peru)	1–1	(Uruguay) Peñarol
Rodríguez 74'	Report	Aguiar 39'

Estadio Nacional, Lima
Attendance: 27,500
Referee: Wilton Sampaio (Brazil)

1 March 2016
19:45 UTC−5

Atlético Nacional (Colombia)	3–0	(Peru) Sporting Cristal
Sánchez 11'; Copete 32'; Moreno 73'	Report

Estadio Atanasio Girardot, Medellín
Attendance: 44,109
Referee: Oscar Maldonado (Bolivia)

8 March 2016
19:45 UTC−5

Sporting Cristal (Peru)	3–2	(Argentina) Huracán
Costa 25'; S. Silva 35', 55' (pen.)	Report	Ábila 56', 78'

Estadio Nacional, Lima
Attendance: 12,000
Referee: Mario Díaz de Vivar (Paraguay)

5 April 2016
19:30 UTC−3

Huracán (Argentina)	4–2	(Peru) Sporting Cristal
Ábila 23', 30'; Kaku 67'; Miralles 83'	Report	S. Silva 17'; Calcaterra 42'

Estadio Tomás Adolfo Ducó, Buenos Aires
Attendance: 27,000
Referee: Raphael Claus (Brazil)

12 April 2016
19:45 UTC−5

Sporting Cristal (Peru)	0–1	(Colombia) Atlético Nacional
	Report	Ibarbo 11' (pen.)

Estadio Nacional, Lima
Attendance: 7,000
Referee: Juan Soto (Venezuela)

19 April 2016
19:30 UTC−3

Peñarol (Uruguay)	4–3	(Peru) Sporting Cristal
Aguiar 29'; Novick 72', 80'; Albarracín 85'	Report	Rodríguez 18', 23'; I. Ávila 36'

Estadio Campeón del Siglo, Montevideo
Attendance: 5,000
Referee: Luiz Flávio de Oliveira (Brazil)

===== Melgar =====
Second stage

17 February 2016
18:45 UTC−5

Melgar (Peru)	1–2	(Brazil) Atlético Mineiro
O. Fernández 14'	Report	Rafael Carioca 20'; Patric 38'

Estadio Monumental de la UNSA, Arequipa
Attendance: 30,000
Referee: Wilson Lamouroux (Colombia)

24 February 2016
19:30 UTC−3

Colo-Colo (Chile)	1–0	(Peru) Melgar
Paredes 64'	Report

Estadio Monumental David Arellano, Santiago
Attendance: 30,000
Referee: Julio Quintana (Paraguay)

1 March 2016
15:15 UTC−5

Melgar (Peru)	0–1	(Ecuador) Independiente del Valle
	Report	Sornoza 36'

Estadio Monumental de la UNSA, Arequipa
Attendance: 15,000
Referee: Óscar Rojas (Uruguay)

15 March 2016
17:30 UTC−5

Independiente del Valle (Ecuador)	2–0	(Peru) Melgar
Sornoza 2'; Jo. Angulo 46'	Report

Estadio Rumiñahui, Sangolquí
Attendance: 4,000
Referee: Raúl Orosco (Bolivia)

7 April 2016
19:45 UTC−5

Melgar (Peru)	1–2	(Chile) Colo-Colo
Cuesta 48'	Report	Paredes 68', 72'

Estadio Monumental de la UNSA, Arequipa
Attendance: 8,000
Referee: Luis Sánchez (Colombia)

14 April 2016
19:30 UTC−3

Atlético Mineiro (Brazil)	4–0	(Peru) Melgar
Tiago 1'; Robinho 7'; Pratto 16' (pen.); Carlos 68'	Report

Estádio Mineirão, Belo Horizonte
Attendance: 36,031
Referee: Jesús Valenzuela (Venezuela)

===== Universidad César Vallejo =====
First stage

3 February 2016
18:45 UTC−5

Universidad César Vallejo (Peru)	1–1	(Brazil) São Paulo
Hohberg 19'	Report	Calleri 65'

Estadio Mansiche, Trujillo
Referee: Roddy Zambrano (Ecuador)

10 February 2016
21:45 UTC−2

São Paulo (Brazil)	1–0	(Peru) Universidad César Vallejo
Rogério 87'	Report

Estádio do Pacaembu, São Paulo
Referee: Christian Ferreyra (Uruguay)

==== Copa Sudamericana ====
===== Real Garcilaso =====
First stage

11 August 2016
16:30 UTC−5

Aucas (Ecuador)	2–1	(Peru) Real Garcilaso
Villacrés 34'; Rojas 37'	Report	Cosme 18'

Estadio Gonzalo Pozo Ripalda, Quito
Referee: Gustavo Murillo (Colombia)

17 August 2016
21:15 UTC−5

Real Garcilaso (Peru)	1–0	(Ecuador) Aucas
Valverde 29'	Report

Estadio Monumental de la UNSA, Arequipa
Referee: Jesús Valenzuela (Venezuela)

Second stage

24 August 2016
15:00 UTC−5

Real Garcilaso (Peru)	2–2	(Chile) Palestino
Valverde 27' (pen.); Santillán 84'	Report	Vidal 7'; Valencia 12' (pen.)

Estadio Inca Garcilaso de la Vega, Cusco
Referee: Raúl Orosco (Bolivia)

15 September 2016
19:15 UTC−3

Palestino (Chile)	1–0	(Peru) Real Garcilaso
Benegas 49'	Report

Estadio Monumental David Arellano, Santiago
Referee: Mario Díaz de Vivar (Paraguay)

===== Sport Huancayo =====
FIrst stage

11 August 2016
17:30 UTC−4

Deportivo Anzoátegui (Venezuela)	2–1	(Peru) Sport Huancayo
Centeno 34'; Cumaná 83'	Report	Martínez 8'

Estadio José Antonio Anzoátegui, Barcelona
Referee: Luis Yrusta (Bolivia)

18 August 2016
15:00 UTC−5

Sport Huancayo (Peru)	1–0	(Venezuela) Deportivo Anzoátegui
Corrales 58'	Report

Estadio Huancayo, Huancayo
Referee: Anderson Daronco (Brazil)

Second stage

25 August 2016
20:45 UTC−4

Sol de América (Paraguay)	1–0	(Peru) Sport Huancayo
Samaniego 7'	Report

Estadio Luis Alfonso Giagni, Asunción
Referee: Germán Delfino (Argentina)

15 September 2016
14:15 UTC−5

Sport Huancayo (Peru)	1–1	(Paraguay) Sol de América
Salcedo 5'	Report	E. Álvarez 79'

Estadio Huancayo, Huancayo
Referee: Néstor Pitana (Argentina)

===== Deportivo Municipal =====
First stage

11 August 2016
21:00 UTC−5

Deportivo Municipal (Peru)	0–5	(Colombia) Atlético Nacional
	Report	Uribe 29'; D. Arias 58'; Berrío 65'; Bernal 76'; Miller 88'

Estadio Alejandro Villanueva, Lima
Referee: Mario Díaz de Vivar (Paraguay)

17 August 2016
21:15 UTC−5

Atlético Nacional (Colombia)	1–0	(Peru) Deportivo Municipal
Bernal 42'	Report

Estadio Atanasio Girardot, Medellín
Referee: Juan Albarracín (Ecuador)

===== Universitario =====
First stage

9 August 2016
21:30 UTC−5

Universitario (Peru)	0–3	(Ecuador) Emelec
	Report	Achilier 52'; Stracqualursi 61', 80'

Estadio Nacional, Lima
Referee: Wilson Lamouroux (Colombia)

16 August 2016
21:00 UTC−5

Emelec (Ecuador)	3–1	(Peru) Universitario
Giménez 22'; Stracqualursi 37' (pen.); Mena 68'	Report	Rengifo 32'

Estadio Christian Benítez Betancourt, Guayaquil
Referee: Raúl Orosco (Bolivia)

==== U-20 Libertadores ====
===== Melgar =====
Group stage

31 January 2016
18:00

Melgar (Peru)	1–1	(Ecuador) Independiente del Valle
Gonzales-Vigil 59'	Report	Toledo 52' (o.g.)

Estadio Dr. Nicolás Léoz, Asunción
Referee: Óscar Rojas (Uruguay)

3 February 2015
20:15

Libertad (Paraguay)	3–1	(Peru) Melgar
Rodríguez 14'; J. Medina 46'; B. Medina 90'	Report	Arias 37'

Estadio Dr. Nicolás Léoz, Asunción
Referee: Wilson Lamouroux (Colombia)

6 February 2016
18:00

Melgar (Peru)	0–3	(Brazil) São Paulo
	Report	Pedro 11'; David Neres 21'; Artur 45'

Estadio Dr. Nicolás Léoz, Asunción
Referee: Luis Yrusta (Bolivia)

=== Women's football ===
Team	2016 Copa Libertadores Femenina
Universitario	Group Stage

== Torneo Descentralizado ==
=== Torneo Apertura ===
Pos	Team	Pld	W	D	L	GF	GA	GD	Pts	Qualification
1	Universitario (C, Q)	15	11	2	2	31	12	+19	35	Qualification to the 2017 Copa Sudamericana
2	Sporting Cristal	15	7	5	3	21	11	+10	26	
3	Alianza Lima	15	8	2	5	24	18	+6	26	
4	Deportivo Municipal	15	7	4	4	19	18	+1	25	
5	Melgar	15	7	3	5	24	18	+6	24	
6	Alianza Atlético	15	7	2	6	24	21	+3	23	
7	Juan Aurich	15	5	7	3	20	20	0	22	
8	Real Garcilaso	15	5	5	5	22	22	0	20	
9	Sport Huancayo	15	4	7	4	14	12	+2	19	
10	Unión Comercio	15	5	4	6	18	23	−5	19	
11	Comerciantes Unidos	15	5	3	7	18	18	0	18	
12	UTC	15	4	6	5	21	23	−2	18	
13	Defensor La Bocana	15	4	4	7	30	31	−1	16	
14	Ayacucho	15	4	4	7	13	26	−13	16	
15	Universidad San Martín	15	4	2	9	15	26	−11	14	
16	Universidad César Vallejo	15	1	4	10	14	29	−15	7	

Updated to match(es) played on 8 May 2016. Source: ADFP
Rules for classification: 1) points; 2) goal difference; 3) goals scored; 4) draw.
(C) Champions; (Q) Qualified for the phase indicated

=== Torneo Clausura ===
Pos	Team	Pld	W	D	L	GF	GA	GD	Pts	Qualification
1	Sporting Cristal (C, Q)	30	14	11	5	46	27	+19	53	Qualification to the 2017 Copa Sudamericana and advance to Liguilla A
2	Universitario	30	15	6	9	51	39	+12	51	Advance to Liguilla B
3	Melgar	30	13	7	10	48	38	+10	46	Advance to Liguilla A
4	Sport Huancayo	30	12	10	8	36	26	+10	46	Advance to Liguilla B
5	Deportivo Municipal	30	12	10	8	36	32	+4	46	Advance to Liguilla A
6	Alianza Lima	30	13	6	11	37	29	+8	45	Advance to Liguilla B
7	Unión Comercio	30	11	9	10	37	39	−2	42	Advance to Liguilla A
8	Comerciantes Unidos	30	11	8	11	36	33	+3	41	Advance to Liguilla B
9	Alianza Atlético	30	12	5	13	41	40	+1	41	Advance to Liguilla B
10	Juan Aurich	30	9	13	8	39	38	+1	40	Advance to Liguilla A
11	UTC	30	9	13	8	36	38	−2	40	Advance to Liguilla B
12	Real Garcilaso	30	10	6	14	39	49	−10	36	Advance to Liguilla A
13	Ayacucho	30	8	9	13	27	42	−15	33	Advance to Liguilla B
14	Defensor La Bocana	30	7	11	12	44	53	−9	30 (Note: La Bocana were deducted 2 points for an outstanding debt with their reserve team.)	Advance to Liguilla A
15	Universidad San Martín	30	8	6	16	33	47	−14	30	Advance to Liguilla B
16	Universidad César Vallejo	30	5	12	13	32	48	−16	27	Advance to Liguilla A

Updated to match(es) played on 14 August 2016. Source: ADFP
Rules for classification: 1) points; 2) goal difference; 3) goals scored; 4) draw.
(C) Champions; (Q) Qualified for the phase indicated

=== Liguillas ===
Liguilla A

Pos	Team	Pld	W	D	L	GF	GA	GD	Pts
1	Sporting Cristal	44	21	12	11	70	48	+22	77 (Note: Sporting Cristal were awarded 2 points for 2016 Torneo de Promoción y Reserva champion.)
2	Melgar	44	21	11	12	68	48	+20	74
3	Deportivo Municipal	44	19	12	13	54	52	+2	69
4	Juan Aurich	44	14	17	13	58	57	+1	59
5	Real Garcilaso	44	16	9	19	55	62	−7	57
6	Unión Comercio	44	14	14	16	51	55	−4	56
7	Universidad César Vallejo	44	11	13	20	52	71	−19	46
8	Defensor La Bocana	44	9	15	20	65	83	−18	38 (Note: La Bocana were deducted 2 points for an outstanding debt with their reserve team. Then were deducted 2 points more for an outstanding debt with their first team.)

Updated to match(es) played on unknown. Source: ADFP
Rules for classification: 1) points; 2) goal difference; 3) goals scored; 4) draw.
Notes:

Liguilla B

Pos	Team	Pld	W	D	L	GF	GA	GD	Pts
1	Universitario	44	20	11	13	73	61	+12	72 (Note: Universitario were awarded 1 point for 2016 Torneo de Promoción y Reserva runner-up.)
2	Alianza Lima	44	19	9	16	56	44	+12	66
3	Comerciantes Unidos	44	17	12	15	64	53	+11	63
4	Sport Huancayo	44	16	14	14	52	44	+8	62
5	Universidad San Martín	44	15	10	19	61	72	−11	55
6	Alianza Atlético	44	16	7	21	63	76	−13	55
7	UTC	44	12	18	14	57	61	−4	54
8	Ayacucho	44	12	16	16	47	59	−12	52

Updated to match(es) played on unknown. Source: ADFP
Rules for classification: 1) points; 2) goal difference; 3) goals scored; 4) draw.

=== Semi-finals ===
November 30, 2016
15:30
First Leg

Deportivo Municipal	1–0	Sporting Cristal
Masakatsu Sawa 90+1'

Iván Elías Moreno, Lima
Attendance: 5,806
Referee: Víctor Hugo Carrillo
December 4, 2016
16:00
Second Leg

Sporting Cristal	1–0	Deportivo Municipal
Carlos Lobaton 3'
Penalties
Cazulo (penalty missed); Silva (penalty missed); Ramúa (penalty scored); Calcaterra (penalty scored); Rojas (penalty scored)	3–2	(penalty scored) Símon; (penalty missed) García; (penalty scored) Vasquez; (penalty missed) Gonzales Vigil; (penalty missed) Zela

Nacional, Lima
Attendance: 19,604
Referee: Miguel Santivañez

December 4, 2016
13:00
Second Leg

Melgar	2–2	Universitario
Omar Fernández 67'; Alexis Arias 77'		14' Diego Manicero; 33' Andy Polo

Virgen de Chapi, Arequipa
Attendance: 28,917
Referee: Diego Haro
November 30, 2016
20:00
First Leg

Universitario	1–2	Melgar
John Galliquio 9'		58' José Carlos Fernández; 86' Bernardo Cuesta

Nacional, Lima
Attendance: 27,438
Referee: Henry Gambetta

=== Third place play-off ===
December 10, 2016
15:00

Universitario	3–2	Deportivo Municipal
Hernán Rengifo 33' 90'; Alexi Gómez 53'		Damián Ísmodes 64'; Velasco 77'

Mansiche, Trujillo
Attendance: 9,177
Referee: Luis Garay

=== Final ===
December 11, 2016
First Leg

Melgar	1–1	Sporting Cristal
Bernardo Cuesta 57'		64' Diego Ifrán

Virgen de Chapi, Arequipa
Attendance: 30,176
Referee: Víctor Hugo Carrillo
December 18, 2016
15:30
Second Leg

Sporting Cristal	0–0	Melgar

Nacional, Lima
Attendance: 32,002
Referee: Henry Gambetta

Sporting Cristal won the cup after defeating FBC Melgar.

== Segunda División ==
=== League table ===
Pos	Team	Pld	W	D	L	GF	GA	GD	Pts	Qualification or relegation
1	Cantolao	30	15	8	7	45	31	+14	53	Title play-off
2	Sport Ancash	30	16	5	9	53	44	+9	53	Title play-off
3	Cienciano	30	15	7	8	48	26	+22	52	
4	Carlos A. Mannucci	30	13	11	6	47	31	+16	50	
5	Deportivo Coopsol	30	14	8	8	39	26	+13	50	
6	Cultural Santa Rosa	30	13	7	10	42	40	+2	46	
7	Alianza Universidad	30	12	9	9	35	24	+11	45	
8	Alfredo Salinas	30	13	4	13	57	36	+21	43	
9	Los Caimanes	30	12	6	12	39	37	+2	42	
10	Sport Loreto	30	9	9	12	39	41	−2	36	
11	Sport Victoria	30	10	6	14	39	53	−14	36	
12	Unión Huaral	30	8	9	13	38	50	−12	33	
13	Willy Serrato	30	9	9	12	36	53	−17	32 (Note: Willy Serrato was docked a total of 4 points for outstanding debts with the SAFAP.)	
14	Sport Boys	30	12	7	11	41	32	+9	31 (Note: Sport Boys was docked a total of 12 points for outstanding debts with the SAFAP.)	
15	Atlético Torino	30	8	10	12	31	41	−10	28 (Note: Torino was docked a total of 6 points for outstanding debts with the SAFAP.)	2017 Copa Perú
16	Unión Tarapoto	30	3	1	26	8	72	−64	10	2017 Copa Perú

Updated to match(es) played on November 17, 2016. Source: ADFP-SD - official site
Rules for classification: 1) points; 2) goal difference; 3) number of goals scored; 4) head-to-head record; 5) drawing of lots

=== Title play-off ===
December 11, 2016
15:00

Cantolao	2–0	Sport Ancash
Jeferson Collazos 4'; José Manzaneda 32'

Alejandro Villanueva, Lima
Attendance: 9,902
Referee: Joel Alarcón

== Copa Perú ==
=== Final group stage ===
Pos	Team	Pld	W	D	L	GF	GA	GD	Pts	Promotion
1	Sport Rosario	3	2	1	0	6	4	+2	7	2017 Torneo Descentralizado
2	Hualgayoc	3	1	1	1	5	3	+2	4	2017 Segunda División
3	Binacional	3	1	0	2	3	4	−1	3	
4	Racing	3	1	0	2	3	6	−3	3	
