= 2016 Torneo Descentralizado =

Torneo Descentralizado
- Season: 2016
- Dates: 5 February 2016 – 18 December 2016
- Champions: Sporting Cristal (18th title)
- Relegated: Universidad César Vallejo; Defensor La Bocana
- Copa Libertadores: Melgar; Deportivo Municipal; Sporting Cristal; Universitario
- Copa Sudamericana: Alianza Lima; Comerciantes Unidos; Juan Aurich; Sport Huancayo
- Matches: 359
- Top goalscorer: Robinson Aponzá (30 goals)
- Highest attendance: 35,452; Universitario 1–0 Alianza Lima (21 July 2016)
- Lowest attendance: 161; Alianza Atlético 4–2 Universidad Técnica de Cajamarca (24 Nov. 2016)
- Total attendance: 1,330,400

The 2016 Torneo Descentralizado de Fútbol Profesional (known as the 2016 Copa Movistar for sponsorship reasons) was the 100th season of the highest division of Peruvian football. A total of 16 teams competed in the season.

== Competition modus ==
The season is divided into four phases. The first phase is the Torneo Apertura with all teams playing each other once either at home or away. The second phase is the Torneo Clausura with all teams entering this phase with their points won in the Torneo Apertura and all teams play each other once either at home or away. The third phase is the Liguilla phase with all teams entering this phase with the points they earned at the end of the Torneo Clausura. In this phase, the teams are divided into two groups and play each team in their group twice at home and away. The two teams with the fewest points in the overall table at the end of the Liguila phase are relegated. The final phase is the Playoffs where the four teams with the most points enter the semifinals. The semifinals are played over two legs. The semifinal winners advance to the two-legged finals and the losers advance to a single leg third place playoff.

The champions, runners-up, and third place playoff winners advance to the 2017 Copa Libertadores. The Torneo Apertura winners, Torneo Clausura winners, and third place playoff losers qualify to the 2017 Copa Sudamericana. The remaining Copa Sudamericana berth is awarded to the team with the best record on the aggregate table that has not qualified for any 2017 international tournament.

== Teams ==
A total of 16 teams have been confirmed to play in the 2016 Torneo Descentralizado. Fourteen teams from the previous season, the 2015 Segunda División champion (Comerciantes Unidos), and the 2015 Copa Perú champion (Defensor La Bocana).

=== Team changes ===
Promoted from 2015 Segunda División	Promoted from 2015 Copa Perú	Relegated from 2015 Primera División
▲ Comerciantes Unidos (1st)	▲ Defensor La Bocana (1st)	▼ Cienciano (15th) ▼ Sport Loreto (16th) ▼ León de Huánuco (17th)

=== Stadia and locations ===
Locations of the 2016 Primera División teams

Team	City	Stadium	Capacity
Alianza Atlético	Sullana	Melanio Colona	5,000
Alianza Lima	Lima	Alejandro Villanueva	35,000
Ayacucho	Ayacucho	Ciudad de Cumaná	15,000
Comerciantes Unidos	Cutervo	Juan Maldonado Gamarra	8,000
Defensor La Bocana	Sechura	Sesquicentenario	5,000
Deportivo Municipal	Lima	Iván Elías Moreno	10,000
Juan Aurich	Chiclayo	Elías Aguirre	24,500
Melgar	Arequipa	Virgen de Chapi	60,000
Real Garcilaso	Cusco	Garcilaso	42,056
Sport Huancayo	Huancayo	Estadio Huancayo	20,000
Sporting Cristal	Lima	Alberto Gallardo	18,000
Unión Comercio	Nueva Cajamarca	IPD de Moyobamba	7,500
Universidad César Vallejo	Trujillo	Mansiche	25,000
Universidad San Martín	Callao	Miguel Grau	17,000
UTC	Cajamarca	Héroes de San Ramón	18,000
Universitario	Lima	Monumental	80,093

== Torneo Apertura ==
The Torneo Apertura was the first stage of the season and culminated with Universitario leading the table earning them a provisional place in the 2016 Copa Sudamericana.

=== Standings ===
Pos	Team	Pld	W	D	L	GF	GA	GD	Pts	Qualification
1	Universitario (C, Q)	15	11	2	2	31	12	+19	35	Qualification to the 2017 Copa Sudamericana
2	Sporting Cristal	15	7	5	3	21	11	+10	26	
3	Alianza Lima	15	8	2	5	24	18	+6	26	
4	Deportivo Municipal	15	7	4	4	19	18	+1	25	
5	Melgar	15	7	3	5	24	18	+6	24	
6	Alianza Atlético	15	7	2	6	24	21	+3	23	
7	Juan Aurich	15	5	7	3	20	20	0	22	
8	Real Garcilaso	15	5	5	5	22	22	0	20	
9	Sport Huancayo	15	4	7	4	14	12	+2	19	
10	Unión Comercio	15	5	4	6	18	23	−5	19	
11	Comerciantes Unidos	15	5	3	7	18	18	0	18	
12	UTC	15	4	6	5	21	23	−2	18	
13	Defensor La Bocana	15	4	4	7	30	31	−1	16	
14	Ayacucho	15	4	4	7	13	26	−13	16	
15	Universidad San Martín	15	4	2	9	15	26	−11	14	
16	Universidad César Vallejo	15	1	4	10	14	29	−15	7	

Updated to match(es) played on 8 May 2016. Source: ADFP
Rules for classification: 1) points; 2) goal difference; 3) goals scored; 4) draw.
(C) Champions; (Q) Qualified for the phase indicated

=== Results ===
Home \ Away	AAS	ALI	AYA	COM	MUN	JA	BOC	MEL	RGA	CRI	SHU	UCO	UCV	USM	UTC	UNI
Alianza Atlético				2–1		3–1	2–2	1–0				4–1		3–0	2–0	
Alianza Lima	2–1		4–1						2–1	2–4	1–0		1–1			1–2
Ayacucho	1–0			1–0				0–3			0–0	2–1		1–1	2–1	2–5
Comerciantes Unidos		2–1				1–1	4–1	2–0	1–0					1–2	1–0	
Deportivo Municipal	2–1	1–2	0–0	1–0							2–0		2–0			1–4
Juan Aurich		1–1	2–0		2–3		2–1		2–2	0–3	1–0		0–0			
Defensor La Bocana		1–2	1–1		4–1				5–0	2–1	1–2	3–3	4–2			
Melgar		1–0			1–1	2–3	2–2		3–1	1–2		2–1				
Real Garcilaso	3–1		2–0		0–0					1–1	1–1		5–2			1–0
Sporting Cristal	3–0		1–0	1–1	0–1						0–0	2–1		1–1		0–1
Sport Huancayo	1–1			2–1				0–0				1–2	2–0	3–0	2–2	0–0
Unión Comercio		0–3		3–2	2–1	0–0			2–1					1–0	1–1	
Universidad César Vallejo	1–2		5–2	1–1				1–2		0–2		0–0				0–2
Universidad San Martín		1–2			0–1	0–1	4–2	2–1	1–3				1–0		2–4	
UTC		1–0			2–2	2–2	2–1	1–3	1–1	0–0			3–1			
Universitario	3–1			2–0		2–2	3–0	1–3				1–0		2–0	3–1	

Updated to match(es) played on May 6, 2016. Source: ADFP - official fixture
Legend: Blue = home team win; Yellow = draw; Red = away team win.

== Torneo Clausura ==
=== Standings ===
Pos	Team	Pld	W	D	L	GF	GA	GD	Pts	Qualification
1	Sporting Cristal (C, Q)	30	14	11	5	46	27	+19	53	Qualification to the 2017 Copa Sudamericana and advance to Liguilla A
2	Universitario	30	15	6	9	51	39	+12	51	Advance to Liguilla B
3	Melgar	30	13	7	10	48	38	+10	46	Advance to Liguilla A
4	Sport Huancayo	30	12	10	8	36	26	+10	46	Advance to Liguilla B
5	Deportivo Municipal	30	12	10	8	36	32	+4	46	Advance to Liguilla A
6	Alianza Lima	30	13	6	11	37	29	+8	45	Advance to Liguilla B
7	Unión Comercio	30	11	9	10	37	39	−2	42	Advance to Liguilla A
8	Comerciantes Unidos	30	11	8	11	36	33	+3	41	Advance to Liguilla B
9	Alianza Atlético	30	12	5	13	41	40	+1	41	Advance to Liguilla B
10	Juan Aurich	30	9	13	8	39	38	+1	40	Advance to Liguilla A
11	UTC	30	9	13	8	36	38	−2	40	Advance to Liguilla B
12	Real Garcilaso	30	10	6	14	39	49	−10	36	Advance to Liguilla A
13	Ayacucho	30	8	9	13	27	42	−15	33	Advance to Liguilla B
14	Defensor La Bocana	30	7	11	12	44	53	−9	30 (Note: La Bocana were deducted 2 points for an outstanding debt with their reserve team.)	Advance to Liguilla A
15	Universidad San Martín	30	8	6	16	33	47	−14	30	Advance to Liguilla B
16	Universidad César Vallejo	30	5	12	13	32	48	−16	27	Advance to Liguilla A

Updated to match(es) played on 14 August 2016. Source: ADFP
Rules for classification: 1) points; 2) goal difference; 3) goals scored; 4) draw.
(C) Champions; (Q) Qualified for the phase indicated

=== Results ===
Home \ Away	AAS	ALI	AYA	COM	MUN	JA	BOC	MEL	RGA	CRI	SHU	UCO	UCV	USM	UTC	UNI
Alianza Atlético		0–1	2–0		2–0				2–1	0–2	0–0		3–1			2–3
Alianza Lima				0–0	1–1	0–2	2–0	2–1				0–1		3–0	0–1	
Ayacucho		1–1			1–1	1–0	3–0		1–2	1–1			0–1			
Comerciantes Unidos	3–1		2–0		1–0					1–3	1–0	0–0	3–1			0–0
Deportivo Municipal						2–1	1–1	1–0	3–0	0–0		4–1		1–0	0–0	
Juan Aurich	0–0			1–1				1–1				1–1		1–3	2–0	2–0
Defensor La Bocana	1–0			2–0		1–1		2–2						2–1	1–1	2–2
Melgar	2–0		2–0	3–2							1–2		1–1	1–0	1–1	5–2
Real Garcilaso		1–0		1–3		3–2	4–1	1–2				0–1		1–0	0–1	
Sporting Cristal		0–2				1–1	1–1	2–1	3–1				1–1		4–0	
Sport Huancayo		2–1	2–1		2–1	3–1	0–0		3–0	3–1						
Unión Comercio	2–2		0–1				3–0	3–1		1–2	2–1		0–1			2–1
Universidad César Vallejo		0–0			2–2	1–3	1–0		1–1		3–1			2–2	1–1	
Universidad San Martín	2–1		1–1	1–1						1–2	2–0	1–1				3–1
UTC	1–2		1–1	2–0							0–0	1–1		3–1		2–1
Universitario		1–0	0–2		2–0				4–1	2–2	0–3		1–1			

Updated to match(es) played on 14 August 2016. Source: ADFP - official fixture
Legend: Blue = home team win; Yellow = draw; Red = away team win.

== Liguillas ==
=== Liguilla A ===
Pos	Team	Pld	W	D	L	GF	GA	GD	Pts
1	Sporting Cristal	44	21	12	11	70	48	+22	77 (Note: Sporting Cristal were awarded 2 points for 2016 Torneo de Promoción y Reserva champion.)
2	Melgar	44	21	11	12	68	48	+20	74
3	Deportivo Municipal	44	19	12	13	54	52	+2	69
4	Juan Aurich	44	14	17	13	58	57	+1	59
5	Real Garcilaso	44	16	9	19	55	62	−7	57
6	Unión Comercio	44	14	14	16	51	55	−4	56
7	Universidad César Vallejo	44	11	13	20	52	71	−19	46
8	Defensor La Bocana	44	9	15	20	65	83	−18	38 (Note: La Bocana were deducted 2 points for an outstanding debt with their reserve team. Then were deducted 2 points more for an outstanding debt with their first team.)

Updated to match(es) played on unknown. Source: ADFP
Rules for classification: 1) points; 2) goal difference; 3) goals scored; 4) draw.

=== Results ===
Home \ Away	MUN	JA	BOC	MEL	RGA	CRI	UCO	UCV
Deportivo Municipal		1–4	2–2	0–0	1–0	1–3	2–0	2–1
Juan Aurich	0–2		1–3	1–1	2–1	0–0	2–1	0–1
Defensor La Bocana	1–2	0–3		1–3	0–2	1–2	3–3	1–3
Melgar	2–1	1–2	1–0		0–0	2–0	1–0	1–0
Real Garcilaso	2–1	1–1	4–2	1–2		1–0	1–0	2–0
Sporting Cristal	0–2	3–0	2–5	3–2	2–1		1–0	7–2
Unión Comercio	1–2	2–2	1–1	0–0	0–0	2–0		3–1
Universidad César Vallejo	3–0	2–1	1–1	2–3	2–0	2–1	0–1	

Updated to match(es) played on unknown. Source: ADFP - official fixture
Legend: Blue = home team win; Yellow = draw; Red = away team win.

=== Liguilla B ===
Pos	Team	Pld	W	D	L	GF	GA	GD	Pts
1	Universitario	44	20	11	13	73	61	+12	72 (Note: Universitario were awarded 1 point for 2016 Torneo de Promoción y Reserva runner-up.)
2	Alianza Lima	44	19	9	16	56	44	+12	66
3	Comerciantes Unidos	44	17	12	15	64	53	+11	63
4	Sport Huancayo	44	16	14	14	52	44	+8	62
5	Universidad San Martín	44	15	10	19	61	72	−11	55
6	Alianza Atlético	44	16	7	21	63	76	−13	55
7	UTC	44	12	18	14	57	61	−4	54
8	Ayacucho	44	12	16	16	47	59	−12	52

Updated to match(es) played on unknown. Source: ADFP
Rules for classification: 1) points; 2) goal difference; 3) goals scored; 4) draw.

=== Results ===
Home \ Away	AAS	ALI	AYA	COM	SHU	USM	UTC	UNI
Alianza Atlético		4–0	1–1	1–0	3–1	2–3	4–2	1–3
Alianza Lima	0–0		0–1	4–0	1–0	1–2	2–1	3–0
Ayacucho	5–2	1–1		2–0	0–1	2–2	2–0	1–1
Comerciantes Unidos	7–2	2–1	3–1		5–1	5–1	1–0	1–1
Sport Huancayo	3–1	1–1	0–0	1–1		3–0	1–1	4–0
Universidad San Martín	3–1	3–0	1–1	1–1	1–0		6–0	4–4
UTC	4–0	0–2	1–1	2–2	3–0	5–0		1–1
Universitario	4–0	0–3	4–2	2–0	1–0	0–1	1–1	

Updated to match(es) played on 2016. Source: ADFP - official fixture
Legend: Blue = home team win; Yellow = draw; Red = away team win.

== Aggregate table ==
All stages (Torneo Apertura, Torneo Clausura, and Liguilla) of the 2016 season are aggregated into a single league table throughout the season to determine the teams that advance to the Playoffs, qualify for international competitions, and are relegated at the end of the season.

Pos	Team	Pld	W	D	L	GF	GA	GD	Pts	Qualification
1	Sporting Cristal (C)	44	21	12	11	70	48	+22	77 (Note: Sporting Cristal were awarded 2 points for 2016 Torneo de Promoción y Reserva champion.)	Advance to Playoffs and qualification to the 2017 Copa Libertadores
2	Melgar	44	21	11	12	68	48	+20	74	Advance to Playoffs and qualification to the 2017 Copa Libertadores
3	Universitario	44	20	11	13	73	61	+12	72 (Note: Universitario were awarded 1 point for 2016 Torneo de Promoción y Reserva runner-up.)	Advance to Playoffs and qualification to the 2017 Copa Libertadores
4	Deportivo Municipal	44	19	12	13	54	52	+2	69	Advance to Playoffs and qualification to the 2017 Copa Libertadores
5	Alianza Lima	44	19	9	16	56	44	+12	66	Qualification to the 2017 Copa Sudamericana first stage
6	Comerciantes Unidos	44	17	12	15	64	53	+11	63	Qualification to the 2017 Copa Sudamericana first stage
7	Sport Huancayo	44	16	14	14	52	44	+8	62	Qualification to the 2017 Copa Sudamericana first stage
8	Juan Aurich	44	14	17	13	58	57	+1	59	Qualification to the 2017 Copa Sudamericana first stage
9	Real Garcilaso	44	16	9	19	55	62	−7	57	
10	Unión Comercio	44	14	14	16	51	55	−4	56	
11	Universidad San Martín	44	15	10	19	61	72	−11	55	
12	Alianza Atlético	44	16	7	21	63	76	−13	55	
13	UTC	44	12	18	14	57	61	−4	54	
14	Ayacucho	44	12	16	16	47	59	−12	52	
15	Universidad César Vallejo (R)	44	11	13	20	52	71	−19	46	Relegation to 2017 Segunda División
16	Defensor La Bocana (R)	44	9	15	20	65	83	−18	38 (Note: La Bocana were deducted 2 points for an outstanding debt with their reserve team. Then were deducted 2 points more for an outstanding debt with their first team.)	Relegation to 2017 Segunda División

Updated to match(es) played on unknown. Source: ADFP
(C) Champions; (R) Relegated

== Playoffs ==
Semifinals
1	Sporting Cristal	0	1	1 (3)
4	Deportivo Municipal	1	0	1 (2)
2	Melgar	2	2	4
3	Universitario	1	2	3

Finals
Sporting Cristal	1	0	1
Melgar	1	0	1
Third Place
Deportivo Municipal	2
Universitario	3

=== Semi-finals ===
==== First leg ====
November 30, 2016
15:30
First Leg

Deportivo Municipal	1–0	Sporting Cristal
Masakatsu Sawa 90+1'

Iván Elías Moreno, Lima
Attendance: 5,806
Referee: Víctor Hugo Carrillo

November 30, 2016
20:00
First Leg

Universitario	1–2	Melgar
John Galliquio 9'		58' José Carlos Fernández; 86' Bernardo Cuesta

Nacional, Lima
Attendance: 27,438
Referee: Henry Gambetta

==== Second leg ====
December 4, 2016
13:00
Second Leg

Melgar	2–2	Universitario
Omar Fernández 67'; Alexis Arias 77'		14' Diego Manicero; 33' Andy Polo

Virgen de Chapi, Arequipa
Attendance: 28,917
Referee: Diego Haro

December 4, 2016
16:00
Second Leg

Sporting Cristal	1–0	Deportivo Municipal
Carlos Lobaton 3'
Penalties
Cazulo (penalty missed); Silva (penalty missed); Ramúa (penalty scored); Calcaterra (penalty scored); Rojas (penalty scored)	3–2	(penalty scored) Símon; (penalty missed) García; (penalty scored) Vasquez; (penalty missed) Gonzales Vigil; (penalty missed) Zela

Nacional, Lima
Attendance: 19,604
Referee: Miguel Santivañez

=== Third place play-off ===
The two losing semi-finalists will play in a match to determine the third place team of the season.

December 10, 2016
15:00

Universitario	3–2	Deportivo Municipal
Hernán Rengifo 33' 90'; Alexi Gómez 53'		Damián Ísmodes 64'; Velasco 77'

Mansiche, Trujillo
Attendance: 9,177
Referee: Luis Garay

Universitario won the third place play-off and qualified for the 2017 Copa Libertadores Second Stage. Municipal qualified for 2017 Copa Libertadores First Stage.

=== Finals ===
The two winning semi-finalists will contest the finals.

December 11, 2016
First Leg

Melgar	1–1	Sporting Cristal
Bernardo Cuesta 57'		64' Diego Ifrán

Virgen de Chapi, Arequipa
Attendance: 30,176
Referee: Víctor Hugo Carrillo

December 18, 2016
15:30
Second Leg

Sporting Cristal	0–0	Melgar

Nacional, Lima
Attendance: 32,002
Referee: Henry Gambetta

Sporting Cristal and Melgar qualified to the 2017 Copa Libertadores Group stage.

Sporting Cristal won on away goals.

== See also ==
- 2016 Torneo de Promoción y Reserva
- 2016 Peruvian Segunda División
- 2016 Copa Perú
- 2016 in Peruvian football
