= Yannick Nzie =

American-Cameroonian footballer

Personal information
- Full name: Yannick Jacques Nzie Ebah
- Date of birth: November 16, 1991 (age 34)
- Place of birth: Douala, Cameroon
- Position: Midfielder

Team information
- Current team: Defensor La Bocana

Youth career
- 2013: WASC Cosmos U23

Senior career*
Years	Team	Apps	(Gls)
2015	Washington Elite		
2016	Sport Victoria	1	(0)
2017	Defensor La Bocana	21	(6)
2018	Sport Victoria	10	(1)
- * Club domestic league appearances and goals

Yannick Nzie (born 16 November 1991 in Cameroon) is an American-Cameroonian footballer who played for Defensor La Bocana of the Peruvian Segunda División as of 2017. He mostly operates as an offensive midfielder.

== Career ==
One of four foreigners flown in to play for Defensor La Bocana in 2016, Nzie only featured once that year, in a 2–0 loss to Alianza Universidad and was given the nickname 'Pepito'. The Cameroonian-born American found it difficult to adapt as he rarely made the roster.

Having a trial with Estonian outfit Lokomotiv Johvi in summer 2014, the club decided not to buy him and the move never transpired.
