= Aurora Chancayllo =

Peruvian football club

- Full name: Club Deportivo Aurora Chancayllo
- Founded: August 10, 1931
- Ground: Estadio Romulo Shaw Cisneros
- League: Copa Perú
Home colours	Away colours

Aurora Chancayllo is a Peruvian football club, playing in the city of Chancay, Huaral, Lima, Peru.

== History ==
The club was founded on August 10, 1931.

In the 1968 Copa Perú, the club qualified to the Final Stage, with the Sport Chorrillos of Talara, Carlos A. Mannucci of Trujillo, Cienciano of the Cusco, FBC Melgar of Arequipa and Colegio Nacional de Iquitos. In the final stage, the club finalized in last place.

In the 1999 Copa Perú, the club qualified to the Regional Stage, but was eliminated by Estudiantes de Medicina of Ica and Somos Aduanas of the Callao.

In the 2000 Copa Perú, the club qualified to the Regional Stage, but was eliminated by Estudiantes de Medicina.

In the 2001 Segunda División Peruana, the club was relegated to the Copa Perú.

In the 2014 Copa Perú, the club qualified to the National Stage, but was eliminated by Sport Loreto in quarterfinals.

== Honours ==
=== Regional ===
- Región IV:

Winners (1): 2014
Runner-up (1): 1999

- Liga Departamental de Lima:

Winners (4): 1967, 1999, 2000, 2014

- Liga Provincial de Huaral:

Winners (4): 1996, 1997, 1999, 2014

- Liga Distrital de Chancay:

Winners (6): 1996, 1997, 1998, 1999, 2000, 2014
Runner-up (1): 2018

== See also ==
- List of football clubs in Peru
- Peruvian football league system
