= Bagua Grande FC =

Bagua Grande
- Full name: Asociación Deportiva Bagua Grande Fútbol Club
- Nickname: Los Bravos de Amazonas
- Founded: September 20, 2012; 13 years ago
- Ground: San Luis, Bagua Grande
- Capacity: 5,000
- League: Copa Perú
Home colours	Away colours

Asociación Deportiva Bagua Grande Fútbol Club (sometimes referred as Bagua Grande) is a Peruvian football club, playing in the city of Bagua Grande, Amazonas, Peru.

== History ==
The Asociación Deportiva Bagua Grande Fútbol Club was founded on September 20, 2012.

In 2013 Copa Perú, the club qualified to the Regional Stage, but was eliminated by UD Chulucanas in the Group Stage.

In 2014 Copa Perú, the club qualified to the Regional Stage, but was eliminated by Cristal Tumbes in the Semifinals.

In 2015 Copa Perú, the club qualified to the National Stage, but was eliminated when it finished in 25th place.

In 2018 Copa Perú, the club qualified to the National Stage, but was eliminated when it finished in 35th place.

== Honours ==
=== Regional ===
- Liga Departamental de Amazonas:

Winners (4): 2013, 2014, 2018, 2022
Runner-up (1): 2015

- Liga Provincial de Utcubamba:

Winners (7): 2013, 2014, 2015, 2017, 2018, 2023, 2025
Runner-up (1): 2022

- Liga Distrital de Bagua Grande:

Winners (8): 2013, 2014, 2015, 2017, 2018, 2019, 2022, 2024
Runner-up (2): 2023, 2025

== See also ==
- List of football clubs in Peru
- Peruvian football league system
