= 2016 Peruvian Segunda División =

Peruvian Segunda División
- Season: 2016
- Dates: 23 April – 11 December 2016
- Champions: Academia Cantolao
- Relegated: Atlético Torino; Unión Tarapoto
- Matches: 205
- Goals: 639 (3.12 per match)
- Top goalscorer: Ramón Rodríguez (14 goals)
- Biggest home win: Alfredo Salinas 8–1 Unión Huaral (27 Nov. 2016)
- Biggest away win: Alianza Universidad 0–2 Alfredo Salinas (22 May 2016); Alfredo Salinas 2–4 Sport Ancash (30 Oct. 2016)
- Highest scoring: Alfredo Salinas 8–1 Unión Huaral (27 Nov. 2016)
- Highest attendance: 30,230; Cienciano 2–1 Mannucci (27 Nov. 2016)
- Total attendance: 571,480
- Average attendance: 2,788

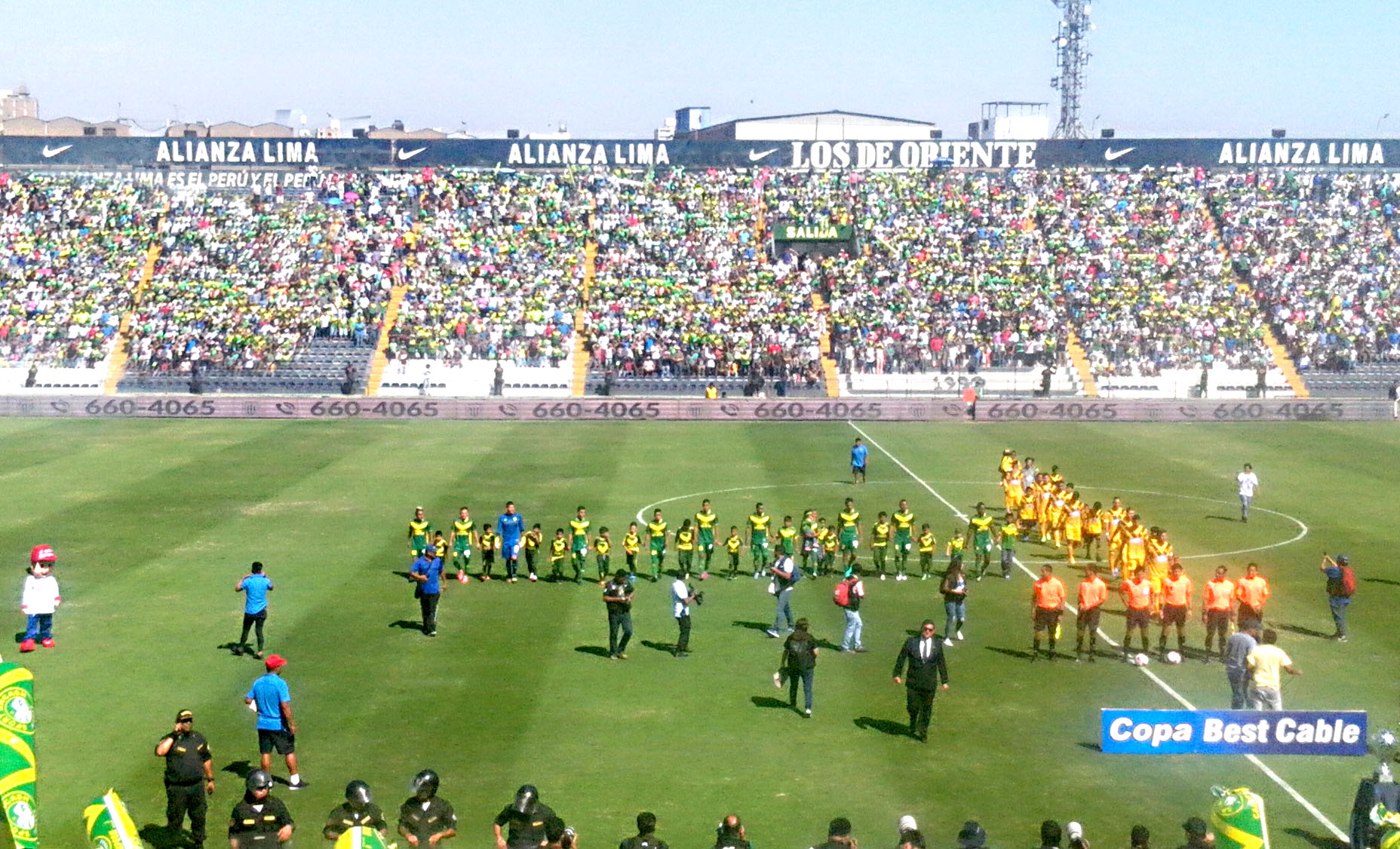
Players from both teams lined up on the field

The 2016 Segunda División season, also known as Copa Best Cable Perú 2016 for sponsorship reasons, was the 64th edition of the second tier of Federación Peruana de Futbol. The tournament was played on a home-and-away round-robin basis. The season started on 23 April 2016. The fixtures were announced on 12 April 2016.

== Teams ==
A total of 16 teams in the league, 4 more than the previous season, including 9 sides from the 2015 season, two relegated from the 2015 Torneo Descentralizado and five promoted from the 2015 Copa Perú.

The 2016 season was the first one were former Copa Sudamericana winners Cienciano were competing outside of the top tier since 1974. Sport Loreto was relegated to the Segunda Division after one year in the top tier. León de Huánuco refused to play in the 2016 Segunda Division and was relegated to the 2016 Copa Perú.

The teams which had been relegated from the Segunda División the previous season were Atlético Minero, and San Simón. San Simón was disabled mid-season and relegated to the Copa Perú for outstanding debts with the SAFAP.

Five Copa Perú teams were promoted: Academia Cantolao, Alfredo Salinas, Unión Tarapoto, Sport Áncash and Cultural Santa Rosa. Cantolao was promoted as 2015 Copa Perú runner-up. Alfredo Salinas, Unión Tarapoto, Sport Áncash and Cultural Santa Rosa were invited to fill in the vacated spots after a strict financial analysis.

=== Team changes ===
| Promoted from 2015 Copa Perú | Relegated from 2015 Primera División | Promoted to 2016 Primera División | Relegated to 2016 Copa Perú |
|---|---|---|---|
| ▲ Academia Cantolao (2nd) ▲ Alfredo Salinas (3rd) ▲ Unión Tarapoto (7th) ▲ Sport Áncash (8th) ▲ Cultural Santa Rosa (10th) | ▼ Cienciano (15th) ▼ Sport Loreto (16th) ▼ León de Huánuco (17th) | ▲ Comerciantes Unidos (1st) | ▼ Atlético Minero (11th) ▼ San Simón (12th) |

=== Stadia and locations ===
Locations of the 2016 Segunda División teams

| Team | City | Stadium | Capacity |
|---|---|---|---|
| Academia Cantolao | Callao | Miguel Grau | 15,000 |
| Alfredo Salinas | Espinar | Municipal de Espinar | 12,000 |
| Alianza Universidad | Huánuco | Heraclio Tapia | 15,000 |
| Atlético Torino | Talara | Campeonísimo | 8,000 |
| Carlos A. Mannucci | Trujillo | Mansiche | 25,000 |
| Cienciano | Cusco | Garcilaso | 40,000 |
| Cultural Santa Rosa | Andahuaylas | Los Chankas | 10,000 |
| Deportivo Coopsol | Chancay | Rómulo Shaw Cisneros | 13,000 |
| Los Caimanes | Puerto Etén | Elias Aguirre | 24,500 |
| Sport Áncash | Huaraz | Rosas Pampa | 18,000 |
| Sport Boys | Callao | Miguel Grau | 15,000 |
| Sport Loreto | Pucallpa | Aliardo Soria | 25,000 |
| Sport Victoria | Ica | José Picasso Peratta | 8,000 |
| Unión Huaral | Huaral | Julio Lores Colan | 10,000 |
| Unión Tarapoto | Tarapoto | Carlos Vidaurre García | 7,000 |
| Willy Serrato | Pimentel | Elías Aguirre | 24,500 |

== League table ==
=== Standings ===
| Pos | Team | Pld | W | D | L | GF | GA | GD | Pts | Qualification or relegation |
|---|---|---|---|---|---|---|---|---|---|---|
| 1 | Academia Cantolao (C, O) | 30 | 15 | 8 | 7 | 45 | 31 | +14 | 53 | Title play-off |
| 2 | Sport Áncash | 30 | 16 | 5 | 9 | 53 | 44 | +9 | 53 | Title play-off |
| 3 | Cienciano | 30 | 15 | 7 | 8 | 48 | 26 | +22 | 52 | |
| 4 | Carlos A. Mannucci | 30 | 13 | 11 | 6 | 47 | 31 | +16 | 50 | |
| 5 | Deportivo Coopsol | 30 | 14 | 8 | 8 | 39 | 26 | +13 | 50 | |
| 6 | Cultural Santa Rosa | 30 | 13 | 7 | 10 | 42 | 40 | +2 | 46 | |
| 7 | Alianza Universidad | 30 | 12 | 9 | 9 | 35 | 24 | +11 | 45 | |
| 8 | Alfredo Salinas | 30 | 13 | 4 | 13 | 57 | 36 | +21 | 43 | |
| 9 | Los Caimanes | 30 | 12 | 6 | 12 | 39 | 37 | +2 | 42 | |
| 10 | Sport Loreto | 30 | 9 | 9 | 12 | 39 | 41 | −2 | 36 | |
| 11 | Sport Victoria | 30 | 10 | 6 | 14 | 39 | 53 | −14 | 36 | |
| 12 | Unión Huaral | 30 | 8 | 9 | 13 | 38 | 50 | −12 | 33 | |
| 13 | Willy Serrato | 30 | 9 | 9 | 12 | 36 | 53 | −17 | 32 (Note: Willy Serrato was docked a total of 4 points for outstanding debts with the SAFAP.) | |
| 14 | Sport Boys | 30 | 12 | 7 | 11 | 41 | 32 | +9 | 31 (Note: Sport Boys was docked a total of 12 points for outstanding debts with the SAFAP.) | |
| 15 | Atlético Torino (R) | 30 | 8 | 10 | 12 | 31 | 41 | −10 | 28 (Note: Torino was docked a total of 6 points for outstanding debts with the SAFAP.) | 2017 Copa Perú |
| 16 | Unión Tarapoto (R) | 30 | 3 | 1 | 26 | 8 | 72 | −64 | 10 | 2017 Copa Perú |

Updated to match(es) played on November 17, 2016. Source: ADFP-SD - official site
Rules for classification: 1) points; 2) goal difference; 3) number of goals scored; 4) head-to-head record; 5) drawing of lots
(C) Champions; (O) Play-off winners; (R) Relegated

== Results ==
| Home \ Away | ASA | AUN | CAN | CAM | CIE | COO | CST | CAI | ANC | SBA | LOR | VIC | TOR | HUA | TAR | WSP |
|---|---|---|---|---|---|---|---|---|---|---|---|---|---|---|---|---|
| Alfredo Salinas | | 3–0 | 1–0 | 2–0 | 1–2 | 0–1 | 4–1 | 5–0 | 2–4 | 1–0 | 4–1 | 7–1 | 5–0 | 8–1 | 3–0 | 1–1 |
| Alianza Universidad | 0–2 | | 1–1 | 0–0 | 0–0 | 0–1 | 3–1 | 3–0 | 1–0 | 4–1 | 1–1 | 2–0 | 3–1 | 2–0 | 3–0 | 3–0 |
| Academia Cantolao | 4–1 | 0–0 | | 0–0 | 2–1 | 2–2 | 0–0 | 1–0 | 2–2 | 1–1 | 1–0 | 1–1 | 1–0 | 4–1 | 3–0 | 2–0 |
| Carlos A. Mannucci | 2–0 | 2–0 | 3–1 | | 0–0 | 2–1 | 2–1 | 2–1 | 6–0 | 1–1 | 3–3 | 3–1 | 0–0 | 3–2 | 3–0 | 3–1 |
| Cienciano | 2–1 | 2–0 | 0–1 | 2–1 | | 0–3 | 3–0 | 3–0 | 1–1 | 2–0 | 2–1 | 3–0 | 3–0 | 3–0 | 2–0 | 4–0 |
| Deportivo Coopsol | 3–1 | 1–1 | 1–2 | 1–2 | 0–0 | | 1–0 | 2–2 | 3–1 | 0–0 | 1–2 | 1–0 | 2–0 | 3–2 | 0–1 | 3–2 |
| Cultural Santa Rosa | 0–0 | 0–2 | 2–1 | 1–0 | 3–4 | 1–0 | | 2–1 | 2–1 | 1–1 | 2–1 | 2–0 | 4–4 | 3–0 | 2–0 | 2–1 |
| Los Caimanes | 3–0 | 2–1 | 0–1 | 0–0 | 1–0 | 0–1 | 1–2 | | 2–0 | 1–0 | 0–0 | 4–0 | 1–0 | 2–2 | 3–0 | 3–0 |
| Sport Áncash | 2–0 | 2–3 | 3–1 | 2–1 | 1–0 | 1–0 | 2–0 | 2–0 | | 3–3 | 1–0 | 6–1 | 1–0 | 2–1 | 3–0 | 4–0 |
| Sport Boys | 3–0 | 0–1 | 2–3 | 1–0 | 3–1 | 0–0 | 3–1 | 1–2 | 1–1 | | 1–0 | 2–0 | 1–0 | 2–3 | 1–0 | 6–0 |
| Sport Loreto | 0–0 | 1–0 | 2–1 | 2–2 | 1–1 | 0–1 | 0–1 | 1–0 | 2–3 | 2–1 | | 2–2 | 2–1 | 3–3 | 3–0 | 2–0 |
| Sport Victoria | 1–0 | 2–1 | 1–2 | 1–1 | 3–2 | 1–2 | 1–1 | 2–1 | 2–2 | 2–1 | 2–1 | | 3–0 | 0–1 | 3–0 | 1–1 |
| Atlético Torino | 1–1 | 0–0 | 3–1 | 1–1 | 1–1 | 1–0 | 2–1 | 1–1 | 3–0 | 2–0 | 1–1 | 2–1 | | 1–0 | 3–0 | 1–1 |
| Unión Huaral | 1–0 | 0–0 | 1–2 | 4–1 | 0–0 | 1–1 | 0–0 | 1–2 | 1–2 | 0–1 | 2–1 | 2–1 | 1–1 | | 3–0 | 0–0 |
| Unión Tarapoto | 0–3 | 0–0 | 0–3 | 1–2 | 0–3 | 0–3 | 0–3 | 1–3 | 3–1 | 0–3 | 1–3 | 0–3 | 1–0 | 0–3 | | 0–3 |
| Willy Serrato | 2–1 | 1–0 | 2–1 | 1–1 | 2–1 | 0–0 | 2–2 | 3–3 | 2–0 | 0–1 | 3–1 | 0–3 | 4–1 | 2–2 | 1–0 | |

Updated to match(es) played on November 2, 2016. Source: ADFP-SD - official fixture
Legend: Blue = home team win; Yellow = draw; Red = away team win.

== Title play-off ==
Because Academia Cantolao and Sport Ancash finished the regular season with the same number of points, a title play-off match will be played on neutral ground to decide the champion and owner of the 2017 Torneo Descentralizado berth.

December 11, 2016
15:00

| Academia Cantolao | 2–0 | Sport Áncash |
|---|---|---|
| Jeferson Collazos 4'; José Manzaneda 32' |

Alejandro Villanueva, Lima
Attendance: 9,902
Referee: Joel Alarcón

== See also ==
- 2016 Torneo Descentralizado
- 2016 Copa Perú
- 2016 in Peruvian football
