= Cristal Tumbes =

- Full name: Club Social Cultural Deportivo Cristal Tumbes
- Nicknames: Los Mondongueros; Los Celestes
- Founded: January 20, 1981; 45 years ago
- Ground: Estadio Mariscal Cáceres, Tumbes
- League: Copa Perú
Home colours	Away colours

Club Social Cultural Deportivo Cristal Tumbes (sometimes referred as Cristal Tumbes) is a Peruvian football club, playing in the city of Tumbes, Peru.

== History ==
The Club Social Cultural Deportivo Cristal Tumbes was founded on January 20, 1981.

In 2014 Copa Perú, the club qualified to the National Stage, but was eliminated by La Bocana in the Semifinals.

In 2015 Copa Perú, the club qualified to the National Stage, but was eliminated by Cantolao.

In 2016 Copa Perú, the club qualified to the National Stage, but was eliminated when it finished in 50th place.

== Honours ==
=== Regional ===
- Liga Departamental de Tumbes:

Winners (3): 2014, 2015, 2016

- Liga Provincial de Tumbes:

Winners (1): 2014

- Liga Superior de Tumbes:

Winners (1): 2015

- Liga Distrital de Tumbes:

Winners (1): 2014

== See also ==
- List of football clubs in Peru
- Peruvian football league system
