= Racing FBC de Huancavelica =

Racing
- Full name: Racing FBC
- Nickname(s): El Rodillo Albiceleste; El Decano
- Founded: April 8, 1942
- Ground: Estadio IPD de Huancavelica, Huancavelica
- Capacity: 2,500
- League: Copa Perú
| Home colours | Away colours |

Racing FBC (sometimes referred as Racing de Huancavelica) is a Peruvian football club, playing in the city of Huancavelica, Peru.

== History ==
The Racing FBC was founded on April 8, 1942.

In 1994 Copa Perú, the club qualified to the Regional Stage, but was eliminated in the Group Stage

In the 2013 Copa Perú, the club qualified to the Regional Stage, but was eliminated by San Ignacio in the Group Stage.

In the 2015 Copa Perú, the club qualified to the National Stage, but was eliminated when it finished in 6th place.

== Honours ==
=== Regional ===
- Liga Departamental de Huancavelica:

Winners (2): 1991, 1994
Runner-up (2): 2013, 2015

- Liga Provincial de Huancavelica:

Winners (7): 1942, 1943, 1944, 1957, 2011, 2013, 2014
Runner-up (1): 2015

- Liga Distrital de Huancavelica:

Winners (1): 2013
Runner-up (4): 2011, 2014, 2015, 2016

== See also ==
- List of football clubs in Peru
- Peruvian football league system
