= 2015 Copa Perú =

Copa Perú
- Season: 2015
- Champions: Defensor La Bocana (1st Title)

The 2015 Peru Cup season (Spanish: Copa Perú 2015), the largest amateur tournament of Peruvian football, started in February.

This edition has featured a change, with the elimination of the Regional Stage and the inclusion of participants from all the Regions of Peru in the National Stage. Under the new format, the tournament has four stages. The first three stages are played as mini-league round-robin tournaments, and the fourth stage is played under POT System intellectual property of the MatchVision company.

The 2015 Peru Cup started with the District Stage (Spanish: Etapa Distrital) in February. The next stage was the Provincial Stage (Spanish: Etapa Provincial) which started in June. The tournament continued with the Departmental Stage (Spanish: Etapa Departamental) in July. The National Stage (Spanish: Etapa Nacional) starts in September. The winner of the National Stage will be promoted to the First Division and the runner-up will be promoted to the Second Division.

== Departmental stage ==
Departmental Stage: 2015 Ligas Departamentales del Peru and 2015 Ligas Superiores del Peru

The following list shows the teams that qualified for the National Stage.

| Department | Team | Location |
|---|---|---|
| Amazonas | UPP | Chachapoyas |
| Amazonas | Bagua Grande | Utcubamba |
| Ancash | Sport Áncash | Huaraz |
| Ancash | DELUSA | Casma |
| Apurímac | Sport Municipal | Andahuaylas |
| Apurímac | Cultural Santa Rosa | Andahuaylas |
| Arequipa | La Colina | Caylloma |
| Arequipa | Sportivo Huracán | Arequipa |
| Ayacucho | Player Villafuerte | Huanta |
| Ayacucho | Deportivo Municipal (Kimbiri) | VRAE |
| Cajamarca | Deportivo Hualgayoc | Hualgayoc |
| Cajamarca | Unión Bambamarca | Bambamarca |
| Callao | Academia Cantolao | Callao |
| Callao | Juventud La Perla | Callao |
| Cusco | Alfredo Salinas | Espinar |
| Cusco | Deportivo Garcilaso | Cusco |
| Huancavelica | UDA | Huancavelica |
| Huancavelica | Racing FBC | Huancavelica |
| Huánuco | Mariano Santos | Leoncio Prado |
| Huánuco | Sport Boys (Tocache) | Tocache |
| Ica | Juventud Barrio Nuevo | Ica |
| Ica | América de Palpa | Palpa |
| Junín | Sport La Vid | Concepción |
| Junín | Trilce Internacional | Huancayo |
| La Libertad | Racing | Sánchez Carrión |
| La Libertad | Real Sociedad | Sánchez Carrión |

| Department | Team | Location |
|---|---|---|
| Lambayeque | Construcción Civil | Chiclayo |
| Lambayeque | Alianza Vista Alegre | Chiclayo |
| Lima | DIM | Lima |
| Lima | Defensor Laure Sur | Huaral |
| Loreto | Bolívar | Maynas |
| Loreto | Red de Salud | Datem del Marañón |
| Madre de Dios | MINSA | Tambopata |
| Madre de Dios | Fray Martín de Porres | Tambopata |
| Moquegua | Deportivo Enersur | Ilo |
| Moquegua | Atlético Huracán | Moquegua |
| Pasco | Alipio Ponce (Pasco) | Pasco |
| Pasco | Sociedad Tiro 28 | Pasco |
| Piura | Defensor La Bocana | Sechura |
| Piura | Túpac Amaru | Sullana |
| Puno | Unión Fuerza Minera | Puno |
| Puno | Alfonso Ugarte | Puno |
| San Martín | Constructora Trujillo | Moyobamba |
| San Martín | Unión Tarapoto | San Martín |
| Tacna | Coronel Bolognesi | Tacna |
| Tacna | Sport Junior | Jorge Basadre |
| Tumbes | Cristal Tumbes | Tumbes |
| Tumbes | José Chiroque Cielo | Zarumilla |
| Ucayali | Deportivo Municipal (CP) | Coronel Portillo |
| Ucayali | Deportivo Municipal (Aguaytía) | Padre Abad |

== National stage ==
For the first time, all the Regions of Peru will have representation in the National Stage, which will be played under Regional using the POT System. The new National Stage starts in the second week of September.

This new phase features the 50 teams that qualified from the Departmental Stage. Each team plays 3 games at home and 3 games away, for a total of 6 games against 3 different geographical rivals. The departmental stage winners only play against departmental runners-up, and vice versa. All the teams are positioned in one general table. After 6 matches, the team in places 1 to 8 are qualified directly to the Round of 16, while the teams in places 9 to 24 will play the Repechage phase. The teams in places 25 to 50 are eliminated.

The creator of this format is the Chilean Leandro A. Shara

The winner of the National Stage will be promoted to the 2016 Torneo Descentralizado and the runner-up of the National Stage will be promoted to the 2016 Peruvian Segunda División.

=== Tie-breaking criteria ===
The ranking of teams in the Unique Table is based on the following criteria:
1. Number of Points
2. Number of Relative Points, which are calculated by multiplying the points obtained against each rival with the total points obtained by this rival.
3. Goal difference
4. Number of goals scored
5. Better performance in away matches based on the following criteria:
1. Number of Away Points
2. Number of Away Relative Points
3. Goal Difference in away games
4. Number of goals scored in away games
6. Number of First-Half points: considering the half-time results as the final results
7. Drawing of lots

=== League table ===
| Pos | Team | Pld | W | D | L | GF | GA | GD | Pts | Qualification |
|---|---|---|---|---|---|---|---|---|---|---|
| 1 | La Colina | 6 | 6 | 0 | 0 | 19 | 4 | +15 | 18 | Round of 16 |
| 2 | Sport La Vid | 6 | 5 | 1 | 0 | 14 | 7 | +7 | 16 | Round of 16 |
| 3 | Cristal Tumbes | 6 | 5 | 0 | 1 | 22 | 7 | +15 | 15 | Round of 16 |
| 4 | Coronel Bolognesi | 6 | 5 | 0 | 1 | 15 | 4 | +11 | 15 | Round of 16 |
| 5 | DIM | 6 | 5 | 0 | 1 | 12 | 4 | +8 | 15 | Round of 16 |
| 6 | Cultural Santa Rosa | 6 | 4 | 2 | 0 | 13 | 6 | +7 | 14 | Round of 16 |
| 7 | Academia Cantolao | 6 | 4 | 2 | 0 | 18 | 6 | +12 | 14 | Round of 16 |
| 8 | Deportivo Municipal (Kimbiri) | 6 | 4 | 1 | 1 | 9 | 4 | +5 | 13 | Round of 16 |
| 9 | Alfredo Salinas | 6 | 4 | 1 | 1 | 14 | 7 | +7 | 13 | Repechage |
| 10 | Sport Boys (Tocache) | 6 | 4 | 1 | 1 | 11 | 8 | +3 | 13 | Repechage |
| 11 | Deportivo Enersur | 6 | 4 | 1 | 1 | 20 | 9 | +11 | 13 | Repechage |
| 12 | Racing | 6 | 4 | 0 | 2 | 17 | 12 | +5 | 12 | Repechage |
| 13 | DELUSA | 6 | 4 | 0 | 2 | 18 | 13 | +5 | 12 | Repechage |
| 14 | Deportivo Hualgayoc | 6 | 4 | 0 | 2 | 10 | 6 | +4 | 12 | Repechage |
| 15 | MINSA | 6 | 4 | 0 | 2 | 14 | 9 | +5 | 12 | Repechage |
| 16 | Construcción Civil | 6 | 4 | 0 | 2 | 10 | 8 | +2 | 12 | Repechage |
| 17 | Unión Tarapoto | 6 | 3 | 2 | 1 | 8 | 6 | +2 | 11 | Repechage |
| 18 | Juventud Barrio Nuevo | 6 | 3 | 2 | 1 | 11 | 3 | +8 | 11 | Repechage |
| 19 | Unión Bambamarca | 6 | 3 | 1 | 2 | 12 | 8 | +4 | 10 | Repechage |
| 20 | Defensor La Bocana | 6 | 3 | 1 | 2 | 12 | 7 | +5 | 10 | Repechage |
| 21 | Trilce Internacional | 6 | 3 | 1 | 2 | 10 | 11 | −1 | 10 | Repechage |
| 22 | Sport Áncash | 6 | 3 | 1 | 2 | 19 | 4 | +15 | 10 | Repechage |
| 23 | José Chiroque Cielo | 6 | 3 | 0 | 3 | 10 | 10 | 0 | 9 | Repechage |
| 24 | Sportivo Huracán | 6 | 3 | 0 | 3 | 7 | 7 | 0 | 9 | Repechage |
| 25 | Bagua Grande | 6 | 3 | 0 | 3 | 5 | 8 | −3 | 9 | Ligas Distritales |
| 26 | Deportivo Municipal (Aguaytía) | 6 | 2 | 3 | 1 | 7 | 6 | +1 | 9 | Ligas Distritales |
| 27 | Unión Fuerza Minera | 6 | 2 | 2 | 2 | 14 | 4 | +10 | 8 | Ligas Distritales |
| 28 | Alfonso Ugarte | 6 | 2 | 2 | 2 | 10 | 8 | +2 | 8 | Ligas Distritales |
| 29 | Bolívar | 6 | 2 | 2 | 2 | 8 | 7 | +1 | 8 | Ligas Distritales |
| 30 | Constructora Trujillo | 6 | 2 | 2 | 2 | 7 | 9 | −2 | 8 | Ligas Distritales |
| 31 | América de Palpa | 6 | 2 | 2 | 2 | 6 | 7 | −1 | 8 | Ligas Distritales |
| 32 | UDA | 6 | 2 | 2 | 2 | 5 | 7 | −2 | 8 | Ligas Distritales |
| 33 | UPP | 6 | 2 | 1 | 3 | 7 | 7 | 0 | 7 | Ligas Distritales |
| 34 | Sociedad Tiro 28 | 6 | 2 | 1 | 3 | 9 | 8 | +1 | 7 | Ligas Distritales |
| 35 | Real Sociedad | 6 | 2 | 0 | 4 | 8 | 17 | −9 | 6 | Ligas Distritales |
| 36 | Deportivo Municipal (CP) | 6 | 1 | 2 | 3 | 5 | 12 | −7 | 5 | Ligas Distritales |
| 37 | Alipio Ponce (Pasco) | 6 | 1 | 1 | 4 | 10 | 12 | −2 | 4 | Ligas Distritales |
| 38 | Player Villafuerte | 6 | 1 | 1 | 4 | 7 | 12 | −5 | 4 | Ligas Distritales |
| 39 | Sport Municipal | 6 | 1 | 1 | 4 | 1 | 7 | −6 | 4 | Ligas Distritales |
| 40 | Túpac Amaru | 6 | 1 | 1 | 4 | 9 | 18 | −9 | 4 | Ligas Distritales |
| 41 | Racing FBC | 6 | 0 | 3 | 3 | 6 | 13 | −7 | 3 | Ligas Distritales |
| 42 | Deportivo Garcilaso | 6 | 1 | 0 | 5 | 5 | 14 | −9 | 3 | Ligas Distritales |
| 43 | Fray Martín de Porres | 6 | 1 | 0 | 5 | 2 | 22 | −20 | 3 | Ligas Distritales |
| 44 | Red de Salud | 6 | 0 | 2 | 4 | 3 | 12 | −9 | 2 | Ligas Distritales |
| 45 | Defensor Laure Sur | 6 | 0 | 2 | 4 | 6 | 16 | −10 | 2 | Ligas Distritales |
| 46 | Mariano Santos | 6 | 0 | 2 | 4 | 5 | 16 | −11 | 2 | Ligas Distritales |
| 47 | Atlético Huracán | 6 | 0 | 1 | 5 | 5 | 22 | −17 | 1 | Ligas Distritales |
| 48 | Alianza Vista Alegre | 6 | 0 | 0 | 6 | 2 | 17 | −15 | 0 | Ligas Distritales |
| 49 | Sport Junior | 6 | 0 | 0 | 6 | 5 | 21 | −16 | 0 | Ligas Distritales |
| 50 | Juventud La Perla | 6 | 0 | 0 | 6 | 0 | 19 | −19 | 0 | Ligas Distritales |

Updated to match(es) played on 2015. Source: ADFP-SD - official site
Rules for classification: 1) points; 2) goal difference; 3) number of goals scored; 4) head-to-head record; 5) drawing of lots

==== Round 1 ====
| Team 1 | Score | Team 2 |
|---|---|---|
| Bolívar | 1–3 | Unión Tarapoto |
| DIM | 3–0 | Juventud La Perla |
| Juventud Barrio Nuevo | 3–0 | Racing FBC |
| Construcción Civil | 3–1 | Túpac Amaru |
| Sport Áncash | 5–0 | Defensor Laure Sur |
| Constructora Trujillo | 2–0 | Real Sociedad |
| Unión Fuerza Minera | 1–2 | Sportivo Huracán |
| Coronel Bolognesi | 3–1 | Atlético Huracán |
| Cristal Tumbes | 6–2 | Alianza Vista Alegre |
| Academia Cantolao | 4–2 | América de Palpa |
| Mariano Santos | 1–1 | Deportivo Municipal (Aguaytía) |
| Alipio Ponce | 5–0 | Sport Boys (Tocache) |
| Sport La Vid | 1–0 | Sociedad Tiro 28 |
| Deportivo Enersur | 5–1 | Alfonso Ugarte |
| Deportivo Hualgayoc | 2–1 | Bagua Grande |
| Deportivo Municipal (CP) | 2–1 | Red de Salud |
| MINSA | 6–1 | Deportivo Garcilaso |
| UDA | 1–0 | Trilce Internacional |
| Player Villafuerte | 2–2 | Cultural Santa Rosa |
| Sport Municipal | 0–0 | Deportivo Municipal (Kimbiri) |
| Alfredo Salinas | 3–0 | Fray Martín de Porres |
| La Colina | 2–1 | Sport Junior |
| Defensor La Bocana | 4–0 | José Chiroque Cielo |
| Racing | 2–0 | DELUSA |
| UPP | 1–1 | Unión Bambamarca |

==== Round 2 ====
| Team 1 | Score | Team 2 |
|---|---|---|
| Trilce Internacional | 1–0 | Alipio Ponce |
| Red de Salud | 1–1 | Constructora Trujillo |
| Juventud La Perla | 0–3 | Juventud Barrio Nuevo |
| Unión Tarapoto | 3–2 | UPP |
| Deportivo Municipal (Kimbiri) | 3–0 | UDA |
| Túpac Amaru | 1–4 | Cristal Tumbes |
| Sport Boys (Tocache) | 2–2 | Deportivo Municipal (CP) |
| Alfonso Ugarte | 5–0 | MINSA |
| Cultural Santa Rosa | 1–0 | Alfredo Salinas |
| Fray Martín de Porres | 0–2 | Unión Fuerza Minera |
| Sociedad Tiro 28 | 3–1 | DIM |
| Bagua Grande | 1–0 | Defensor La Bocana |
| Unión Bambamarca | 4–2 | Racing |
| Deportivo Municipal (Aguaytía) | 1–3 | Bolívar |
| Defensor Laure Sur | 2–2 | Academia Cantolao |
| América de Palpa | 1–0 | Player Villafuerte |
| Racing FBC | 0–1 | Sport La Vid |
| Deportivo Garcilaso | 1–0 | Sport Municipal |
| Sportivo Huracán | 2–1 | Coronel Bolognesi |
| Sport Junior | 0–4 | Deportivo Enersur |
| Atlético Huracán | 1–3 | La Colina |
| José Chiroque Cielo | 2–0 | Construcción Civil |
| Real Sociedad | 1–0 | Sport Áncash |
| DELUSA | 9–2 | Mariano Santos |
| Alianza Vista Alegre | 0–3 | Deportivo Hualgayoc |

==== Round 3 ====
| Team 1 | Score | Team 2 |
|---|---|---|
| Bolívar | 1–1 | Red de Salud |
| La Colina | 3–2 | Sportivo Huracán |
| Juventud Barrio Nuevo | 0–1 | América de Palpa |
| Academia Cantolao | 1–0 | Juventud La Perla |
| Sport Áncash | 5–0 | DELUSA |
| Construcción Civil | 1–0 | Alianza Vista Alegre |
| Player Villafuerte | 1–3 | Deportivo Municipal (Kimbiri) |
| Cristal Tumbes | 4–1 | José Chiroque Cielo |
| Constructora Trujillo | 0–0 | Unión Tarapoto |
| Mariano Santos | 0–2 | Sport Boys (Tocache) |
| Alipio Ponce | 2–2 | Sociedad Tiro 28 |
| Unión Fuerza Minera | 0–0 | Alfonso Ugarte |
| Alfredo Salinas | 2–1 | Deportivo Garcilaso |
| Sport La Vid | 2–1 | Trilce Internacional |
| Defensor La Bocana | 2–1 | Túpac Amaru |
| UPP | 1–0 | Bagua Grande |
| Deportivo Hualgayoc | 1–0 | Unión Bambamarca |
| Deportivo Municipal (CP) | 1–1 | Deportivo Municipal (Aguaytía) |
| UDA | 1–1 | Racing FBC |
| Sport Municipal | 0–3 | Cultural Santa Rosa |
| Deportivo Enersur | 4–1 | Atlético Huracán |
| MINSA | 0–1 | Fray Martín de Porres |
| Coronel Bolognesi | 3–0 | Sport Junior |
| DIM | 1–0 | Defensor Laure Sur |
| Racing | 2–0 | Real Sociedad |

==== Round 4 ====
| Team 1 | Score | Team 2 |
|---|---|---|
| Sportivo Huracán | 0–1 | La Colina |
| Red de Salud | 0–2 | Bolívar |
| Túpac Amaru | 1–1 | Defensor La Bocana |
| Unión Tarapoto | 2–0 | Constructora Trujillo |
| Sport Boys (Tocache) | 1–0 | Mariano Santos |
| América de Palpa | 1–1 | Juventud Barrio Nuevo |
| Deportivo Municipal (Kimbiri) | 2–1 | Player Villafuerte |
| Alfonso Ugarte | 1–1 | Unión Fuerza Minera |
| Trilce Internacional | 3–3 | Sport La Vid |
| Sociedad Tiro 28 | 3–0 | Alipio Ponce |
| Bagua Grande | 1–0 | UPP |
| Defensor Laure Sur | 0–1 | DIM |
| Deportivo Municipal (Aguaytía) | 2–0 | Deportivo Municipal (CP) |
| Racing FBC | 1–1 | UDA |
| Cultural Santa Rosa | 1–0 | Sport Municipal |
| Deportivo Garcilaso | 1–3 | Alfredo Salinas |
| Fray Martín de Porres | 0–4 | MINSA |
| Atlético Huracán | 2–2 | Deportivo Enersur |
| Sport Junior | 1–3 | Coronel Bolognesi |
| Unión Bambamarca | 3–0 | Deportivo Hualgayoc |
| José Chiroque Cielo | 2–0 | Cristal Tumbes |
| Real Sociedad | 1–5 | Racing |
| Alianza Vista Alegre | 0–1 | Construcción Civil |
| DELUSA | 1–0 | Sport Áncash |
| Juventud La Perla | 0–6 | Academia Cantolao |

==== Round 5 ====
| Team 1 | Score | Team 2 |
|---|---|---|
| Bolívar | 1–2 | Deportivo Municipal (Aguaytía) |
| DIM | 3–1 | Sociedad Tiro 28 |
| Academia Cantolao | 5–2 | Defensor Laure Sur |
| Construcción Civil | 2–1 | José Chiroque Cielo |
| Sport Áncash | 7–0 | Real Sociedad |
| Mariano Santos | 2–3 | DELUSA |
| Unión Fuerza Minera | 10–0 | Fray Martín de Porres |
| Player Villafuerte | 2–1 | América de Palpa |
| Cristal Tumbes | 5–1 | Túpac Amaru |
| Alipio Ponce | 2–3 | Trilce Internacional |
| Sport La Vid | 6–3 | Racing FBC |
| Defensor La Bocana | 4–0 | Bagua Grande |
| Deportivo Enersur | 5–3 | Sport Junior |
| La Colina | 6–0 | Atlético Huracán |
| MINSA | 2–1 | Alfonso Ugarte |
| Coronel Bolognesi | 1–0 | Sportivo Huracán |
| Juventud Barrio Nuevo | 3–0 | Juventud La Perla |
| Alfredo Salinas | 3–3 | Cultural Santa Rosa |
| Deportivo Hualgayoc | 3–0 | Alianza Vista Alegre |
| UPP | 3–0 | Unión Tarapoto |
| Sport Municipal | 1–0 | Deportivo Garcilaso |
| UDA | 1–0 | Deportivo Municipal (Kimbiri) |
| Racing | 4–2 | Unión Bambamarca |
| Constructora Trujillo | 3–0 | Red de Salud |
| Deportivo Municipal (CP) | 0–3 | Sport Boys (Tocache) |

==== Round 6 ====
| Team 1 | Score | Team 2 |
|---|---|---|
| Unión Tarapoto | 0–0 | Bolívar |
| Juventud La Perla | 0–3 | DIM |
| Racing FBC | 1–1 | Juventud Barrio Nuevo |
| Túpac Amaru | 4–3 | Construcción Civil |
| Defensor Laure Sur | 2–2 | Sport Áncash |
| Real Sociedad | 6–1 | Constructora Trujillo |
| Sportivo Huracán | 1–0 | Unión Fuerza Minera |
| Atlético Huracán | 0–4 | Coronel Bolognesi |
| Cristal Tumbes | 0–3 | Alianza Vista Alegre |
| América de Palpa | 0–0 | Academia Cantolao |
| Deportivo Municipal (Aguaytía) | 0–0 | Mariano Santos |
| Sport Boys (Tocache) | 3–1 | Alipio Ponce |
| Sociedad Tiro 28 | 0–1 | Sport La Vid |
| Alfonso Ugarte | 2–0 | Deportivo Enersur |
| Bagua Grande | 2–1 | Deportivo Hualgayoc |
| Red de Salud | not played | Deportivo Municipal (CP) |
| Deportivo Garcilaso | 1–2 | MINSA |
| Trilce Internacional | 2–1 | UDA |
| Cultural Santa Rosa | 3–1 | Player Villafuerte |
| Deportivo Municipal (Kimbiri) | 1–0 | Sport Municipal |
| Fray Martín de Porres | 1–3 | Alfredo Salinas |
| Sport Junior | 0–4 | La Colina |
| José Chiroque Cielo | 4–1 | Defensor La Bocana |
| DELUSA | 5–2 | Racing |
| Unión Bambamarca | 2–0 | UPP |

=== Repechage ===
| Team 1 | Agg. | Team 2 | 1st leg | 2nd leg |
|---|---|---|---|---|
| Sportivo Huracán | 1–3 | Alfredo Salinas | 1–2 | 0–1 |
| Sport Boys (Tocache) | 5–6 | José Chiroque Cielo | 5–0 | 0–6 |
| Deportivo Enersur | 1–7 | Sport Áncash | 1–2 | 0–5 |
| Trilce Internacional | 0–6 | Racing | 0–2 | 0–4 |
| Defensor La Bocana | 5–3 | DELUSA | 5–3 | 0–0 |
| Unión Bambamarca | 1–1 | Deportivo Hualgayoc | 1–1 | 0–0 |
| MINSA | 3–4 | Juventud Barrio Nuevo | 1–2 | 2–2 |
| Construcción Civil | 0–3 | Unión Tarapoto | 0–0 | 0–3 |

=== Bracket ===
Round of 16
La Colina | 1 | 1 | 2
Unión Tarapoto | 2 | 1 | 3
Deportivo Municipal (K) | 0 | 1 | 1
Alfredo Salinas | 3 | 1 | 4
Coronel Bolognesi | 1 | 2 | 3
Defensor La Bocana | 5 | 1 | 6
DIM | 1 | 2 | 3
Racing | 3 | 0 | 3
Sport La Vid | 0 | 4 | 4
Juventud Barrio Nuevo | 1 | 1 | 2
Academia Cantolao | 1 | 4 | 5
José Chiroque Cielo | 1 | 0 | 1
Cristal Tumbes | 0 | 5 | 5
Deportivo Hualgayoc | 2 | 1 | 3
Cultural Santa Rosa | 0 | 2 | 2
Sport Ancash | 2 | 1 | 3

Quarterfinals
Unión Tarapoto | 0 | 1 | 1
Alfredo Salinas | 1 | 1 | 2
Defensor La Bocana | 2 | 2 | 4
DIM | 0 | 2 | 2
Sport La Vid | 1 | 1 | 2
Academia Cantolao | 5 | 0 | 5
Cristal Tumbes | 1 | 3 | 4
Sport Ancash | 1 | 1 | 2

Semifinals
Alfredo Salinas | 0 | 6 | 6
Defensor La Bocana | 9 | 0 | 9
Academia Cantolao | 2 | 2 | 4
Cristal Tumbes | 1 | 2 | 3

Champion & Runner-Up
Defensor La Bocana | 2 | 2 | 4
Academia Cantolao | 0 | 3 | 3

=== Round of 16 ===
| Team 1 | Agg. | Team 2 | 1st leg | 2nd leg |
|---|---|---|---|---|
| Unión Tarapoto | 3–2 | La Colina | 2–1 | 1–1 |
| Alfredo Salinas | 4–1 | Deportivo Municipal (Kimbiri) | 3–0 | 1–1 |
| Defensor La Bocana | 6–3 | Coronel Bolognesi | 5–1 | 1–2 |
| Racing | 3–3 | DIM | 3–1 | 0–2 |
| Juventud Barrio Nuevo | 2–4 | Sport La Vid | 1–0 | 1–4 |
| José Chiroque Cielo | 1–5 | Academia Cantolao | 1–1 | 0–4 |
| Deportivo Hualgayoc | 3–5 | Cristal Tumbes | 2–0 | 1–5 |
| Sport Áncash | 3–2 | Cultural Santa Rosa | 2–0 | 1–2 |

=== Quarterfinals ===
| Team 1 | Agg. | Team 2 | 1st leg | 2nd leg |
|---|---|---|---|---|
| Unión Tarapoto | 1–2 | Alfredo Salinas | 0–1 | 1–1 |
| Defensor La Bocana | 4–2 | DIM | 2–0 | 2–2 |
| Academia Cantolao | 5–2 | Sport La Vid | 5–1 | 0–1 |
| Sport Áncash | 2–4 | Cristal Tumbes | 1–1 | 1–3 |

=== Semifinals ===
| Team 1 | Agg. | Team 2 | 1st leg | 2nd leg |
|---|---|---|---|---|
| Defensor La Bocana | 9–6 | Alfredo Salinas | 9–0 | 0–6 |
| Academia Cantolao | 4–3 | Cristal Tumbes | 2–1 | 2–2 |

=== Final ===
| Team 1 | Agg. | Team 2 | 1st leg | 2nd leg |
|---|---|---|---|---|
| Defensor La Bocana | 4–3 | Academia Cantolao | 2–0 | 2–3 |

== See also ==
- 2015 Torneo Descentralizado
- 2015 Peruvian Segunda División
