= 2013 Copa Perú =

Copa Perú
- Season: 2013
- Champions: San Simón (1st Title)
- Biggest home win: Unión Huaral 6–2 Juventud La Perla
- Biggest away win: Aipsa 1–8 Sport Loreto; Márquez 0–7 Aipsa
- Highest scoring: 9 goals: Aipsa 1–8 Sport Loreto; Only Regional and National Stage considered.

The 2013 Peru Cup season (Spanish: Copa Perú 2013), the promotion tournament of Peruvian football, started on February.

The tournament has 5 stages. The first four stages are played as mini-league round-robin tournaments, except for third stage in region IV, which is played as a knockout stage. The final stage features two knockout rounds and a final four-team group stage to determine the two promoted teams.

The 2013 Peru Cup started with the District Stage (Spanish: Etapa Distrital) on February. The next stage was the Provincial Stage (Spanish: Etapa Provincial) which started on June. The tournament continued with the Departamental Stage (Spanish: Etapa Departamental) on July. The Regional Stage follow in September. The National Stage (Spanish: Etapa Nacional) starts in November. The winner of the National Stage will be promoted to the First Division and the runner-up will be promoted to the Second Division.

== Departmental Stage ==
Departmental Stage: 2013 Ligas Departamentales del Peru and 2013 Ligas Superiores del Peru

The following list shows the teams that qualified for the Regional Stage.

Department	Team	Location
Amazonas	Bagua Grande	Bagua Grande
Amazonas	Deportivo Municipal (RdM)	Rodríguez de Mendoza
Ancash	Universidad San Pedro	Santa
Ancash	El Obrero	Recuay
Apurímac	Cultural Santa Rosa	Andahuaylas
Apurímac	José María Arguedas	Andahuaylas
Arequipa	Saetas de Oro	Arequipa
Arequipa	Internacional	Arequipa
Ayacucho	Deportivo Municipal (Santillana)	Ayacucho
Ayacucho	IST Federico Gonzáles	Ayacucho
Cajamarca	Santa Ana	Cajamarca
Cajamarca	Comerciantes Unidos	Cajamarca
Callao	Márquez	Callao
Callao	Juventud La Perla	Callao
Cusco	Real Municipal	Cusco
Cusco	Deportivo Yawarmayu	Cusco
Huancavelica	Deportivo Municipal (Paucará)	Paucará
Huancavelica	Racing FBC	Huancavelica
Huánuco	Real Panaococha	Pachitea
Huánuco	Unión Cayumba Grande	Leoncio Prado
Ica	Defensor Zarumilla	Ica
Ica	San Ignacio	Ica
Junín	Alipio Ponce	Junín
Junín	Sport Aguila	Junín
La Libertad	Carlos A. Mannucci	Trujillo
La Libertad	Deportivo Municipal (Huamachuco)	Huamachuco

Department	Team	Location
Lambayeque	Universidad Señor de Sipán	Lambayeque
Lambayeque	Willy Serrato	Chiclayo
Lima	Unión Huaral	Lima
Lima	AIPSA	Lima
Loreto	Bolívar	Maynas
Loreto	CNI	Iquitos
Madre de Dios	30 de Agosto	Tambopata
Madre de Dios	MINSA	Tambopata
Moquegua	Estudiantes Alas Peruanas	Moquegua
Moquegua	San Simón	Moquegua
Pasco	Real Santiago Allauca	Pasco
Pasco	Ecosem	Pasco
Piura	Atlético Grau	Piura
Piura	Defensor La Bocana	Piura
Piura	UD Paita	Piura
Puno	Unión Fuerza Minera	Puno
Puno	Binacional	Puno
Puno	Franciscano San Román	Juliaca
San Martín	Unión César Vallejo	San Martín
San Martín	Deportivo Cali	San Martín
Tacna	Coronel Bolognesi	Tacna
Tacna	4 de Diciembre	Tacna
Tumbes	UD Chulucanas	Tumbes
Tumbes	Sport San Martín	Tumbes
Ucayali	Deportivo Bancos	Coronel Portillo
Ucayali	Sport Loreto	Coronel Portillo

== Regional Stage ==
Each region had two teams qualify for the next stage. The playoffs only determined the respective regional winners.

=== Region I ===
Region I includes qualified teams from Amazonas, Lambayeque, Tumbes and Piura region.

==== Group A ====
Pos	Team	Pld	W	D	L	GF	GA	GD	Pts	Qualification	UDC	UDP	BGR
1	UD Chulucanas	4	2	2	0	6	3	+3	8	Región I - Semifinals		2–0	2–1
2	UD Paita	4	1	1	2	4	4	0	4		1–1		3–0
3	Bagua Grande	4	1	1	2	3	6	−3	4		1–1	1–0	

Legend: Blue = home team win; Yellow = draw; Red = away team win.

==== Group B ====
Pos	Team	Pld	W	D	L	GF	GA	GD	Pts	Qualification	BOC	SSM	USS
1	Defensor La Bocana	4	2	0	2	9	7	+2	6	Región I - Semifinals		4–1	3–1
2	Sport San Martín	4	2	0	2	7	8	−1	6		1–0		3–1
3	Universidad Señor de Sipán	4	2	0	2	7	9	−2	6		2–1	3–2	

Legend: Blue = home team win; Yellow = draw; Red = away team win.

===== Tiebreaker =====
Team 1	Score	Team 2
Defensor La Bocana	2–1	Universidad Señor de Sipán
Sport San Martín	1–2	Defensor La Bocana

==== Group C ====
Pos	Team	Pld	W	D	L	GF	GA	GD	Pts	Qualification	WSP	GRA	MRM
1	Willy Serrato	4	4	0	0	11	0	+11	12	Región I - Semifinals		2–0	5–0
2	Atlético Grau	4	2	0	2	5	4	+1	6	Región I - Semifinals	0–1		3–0
3	Deportivo Municipal (RdM)	4	0	0	4	1	13	−12	0		0–3	1–2	

Legend: Blue = home team win; Yellow = draw; Red = away team win.

==== Semifinals ====
Team 1	Agg.	Team 2	1st leg	2nd leg
Atlético Grau	2–4	UD Chulucanas	1–1	1–3
Defensor La Bocana	3–5	Willy Serrato	0–3	3–2

=== Region II ===
Region II includes qualified teams from Ancash, Cajamarca, La Libertad and San Martín region.

==== Group A ====
Pos	Team	Pld	W	D	L	GF	GA	GD	Pts	Qualification	COM	DCT	MUH	EOR
1	Comerciantes Unidos	6	4	0	2	10	5	+5	12	National stage		3–0	2–0	3–0
2	Deportivo Cali	6	3	1	2	11	7	+4	10		4–0		3–0	4–0
3	Deportivo Municipal (Huamachuco)	6	3	0	3	9	9	0	9		1–0	4–0		1–2
4	El Obrero	6	1	1	4	4	13	−9	4		0–2	0–0	2–3	

Legend: Blue = home team win; Yellow = draw; Red = away team win.

==== Group B ====
Pos	Team	Pld	W	D	L	GF	GA	GD	Pts	Qualification	CAM	USP	UCV	SAC
1	Carlos A. Mannucci	6	3	1	2	17	7	+10	10	National stage		4–0	4–0	4–0
2	Universidad San Pedro	6	3	0	3	5	12	−7	9		2–1		1–0	1–0
3	Unión César Vallejo	6	2	2	2	14	13	+1	8		3–3	6–1		2–1
4	Santa Ana	6	2	1	3	7	11	−4	7		2–1	1–0	3–3	

Legend: Blue = home team win; Yellow = draw; Red = away team win.

=== Region III ===
Region III includes qualified teams from Loreto and Ucayali region.

Pos	Team	Pld	W	D	L	GF	GA	GD	Pts	Qualification	LOR	CNI	BOL	BAN
1	Sport Loreto	6	3	1	2	9	8	+1	10	National stage		2–1	1–0	3–2
2	CNI	6	3	1	2	8	7	+1	10	National stage	2–1		1–0	2–2
3	Bolívar	6	2	2	2	5	4	+1	8		2–1	1–0		1–1
4	Deportivo Bancos	6	0	4	2	8	10	−2	4		1–1	1–2	1–1	

Legend: Blue = home team win; Yellow = draw; Red = away team win.

==== Regional Final ====
Team 1	Score	Team 2
CNI	1–2	Sport Loreto

=== Region IV ===
Region IV includes qualified teams from Lima and Callao region.

==== Semifinals ====
Team 1	Agg.	Team 2	1st leg	2nd leg
Márquez	1–10	AIPSA	1–3	0–7
Unión Huaral	9–2	Juventud La Perla	3–0	6–2

==== Regional Final ====
Team 1	Score	Team 2
Unión Huaral	3–1	AIPSA

=== Region V ===
Region V includes qualified teams from Junín, Pasco and Huánuco region.

==== Group A ====
Pos	Team	Pld	W	D	L	GF	GA	GD	Pts	Qualification	APM	RPA	RSA
1	Alipio Ponce	4	3	0	1	10	4	+6	9	National stage		4–1	4–1
2	Real Panaococha	4	2	1	1	3	4	−1	7		1–0		1–0
3	Real Santiago Allauca	4	0	1	3	2	7	−5	1		1–2	0–0	

Legend: Blue = home team win; Yellow = draw; Red = away team win.

==== Group B ====
Pos	Team	Pld	W	D	L	GF	GA	GD	Pts	Qualification	SÁG	ECO	UCA
1	Sport Águila	4	2	2	0	6	4	+2	8			1–1	1–0
2	Ecosem	4	1	3	0	6	3	+3	6	National stage	1–1		3–0
3	Unión Cayumba	4	0	1	3	3	8	−5	1		2–3	1–1	

Legend: Blue = home team win; Yellow = draw; Red = away team win.

=== Region VI ===
Region VI includes qualified teams from Ayacucho, Huancavelica and Ica region. Two teams qualified from this stage.

==== Group A ====
Pos	Team	Pld	W	D	L	GF	GA	GD	Pts	Qualification	SIP	RHU	IFG
1	San Ignacio	4	2	1	1	9	6	+3	7	National stage		2–0	4–2
2	Racing FBC	4	2	0	2	5	6	−1	6		1–0		1–2
3	IST Federico Gonzáles	4	1	1	2	9	11	−2	4		3–3	2–3	

Legend: Blue = home team win; Yellow = draw; Red = away team win.

==== Group B ====
Pos	Team	Pld	W	D	L	GF	GA	GD	Pts	Qualification	MUS	DZA	MUP
1	Deportivo Municipal (Santillana)	4	4	0	0	9	3	+6	12	National stage		1–0	1–0
2	Defensor Zarumilla	4	1	1	2	3	6	−3	4		0–3		1–0
3	Deportivo Municipal (Paucará)	4	0	1	3	5	8	−3	1		3–4	2–2	

Legend: Blue = home team win; Yellow = draw; Red = away team win.

==== Regional Final ====
Team 1	Agg.	Team 2	1st leg	2nd leg
San Ignacio	2–1	Deportivo Municipal (Santillana)	0–0	2–1

=== Region VII ===
Region VII includes qualified teams from Arequipa, Moquegua and Tacna region.

==== Group A ====
Pos	Team	Pld	W	D	L	GF	GA	GD	Pts	Qualification	EAP	INT	4DC
1	Estudiantes Alas Peruanas	4	3	1	0	9	5	+4	10	Región VII - Semifinals		3–1	2–1
2	Internacional	4	1	1	2	6	8	−2	4	Región VII - Semifinals	1–2		1–0
3	4 de Diciembre	4	0	2	2	6	8	−2	2		2–2	3–3	

Legend: Blue = home team win; Yellow = draw; Red = away team win.

==== Group B ====
Pos	Team	Pld	W	D	L	GF	GA	GD	Pts	Qualification	SSI	SOR	BOL
1	San Simón	4	2	1	1	11	8	+3	7	Región VII - Semifinals		5–3	3–1
2	Saetas de Oro	4	2	0	2	10	12	−2	6	Región VII - Semifinals	2–1		3–2
3	Coronel Bolognesi	4	1	1	2	9	10	−1	4		2–2	4–2	

Legend: Blue = home team win; Yellow = draw; Red = away team win.

==== Semifinals ====
Team 1	Agg.	Team 2	1st leg	2nd leg
Estudiantes Alas Peruanas	3–7	Saetas de Oro	0–5	3–2
Internacional	1–3	San Simón	0–1	1–2

=== Region VIII ===
Region VIII includes qualified teams from Apurimac, Cusco, Madre de Dios and Puno region.

==== Group A ====
Pos	Team	Pld	W	D	L	GF	GA	GD	Pts	Qualification	UFM	FSR	DPY	30A	CST
1	Unión Fuerza Minera	8	4	4	0	26	7	+19	16	National stage		4–0	1–0	12–0	2–0
2	Franciscano San Román	8	4	1	3	11	13	−2	13		3–3		2–1	3–1	1–0
3	Deportivo Yawarmayu	8	3	1	4	12	10	+2	10		2–2	1–0		5–0	1–0
4	30 de Agosto	8	3	1	4	8	25	−17	10		1–1	2–0	3–1		1–0
5	Cultural Santa Rosa	8	2	1	5	7	9	−2	7		1–1	1–2	1–0	3–0	

Legend: Blue = home team win; Yellow = draw; Red = away team win.

==== Group B ====
Pos	Team	Pld	W	D	L	GF	GA	GD	Pts	Qualification	BID	MIN	JMA	RMU
1	Binacional	6	3	2	1	14	5	+9	11	National stage		4–1	0–0	5–1
2	MINSA	6	2	2	2	10	10	0	8		1–0		2–2	4–0
3	José María Arguedas	6	1	3	2	7	10	−3	6		0–3	3–1		1–1
4	Real Municipal	6	1	3	2	8	14	−6	6		2–2	1–1	3–1	

Legend: Blue = home team win; Yellow = draw; Red = away team win.

== National Stage ==
The National Stage starts on November. This stage has two knockout rounds and four-team group stage. The winner will be promoted to the 2014 Torneo Descentralizado and the runner-up of the National Stage will be promoted to the 2014 Peruvian Segunda División.

Round of 16
UD Chulucanas	0	1	1
Carlos A. Mannucci	1	1	2
Comerciantes Unidos	1	2	3 (1)
Willy Serrato	2	1	3 (3)
Sport Loreto	0	8	8
AIPSA	2	1	3
Unión Huaral	2	1	3
CNI	0	2	2
Alipio Ponce	1	2	3
Deportivo Municipal (S)	0	3	3
San Ignacio	1	1	2
Ecosem	3	0	3
Binacional	1	0	1
San Simón	0	2	2
Saetas de Oro	1	0	1 (4)
Unión Fuerza Minera	0	1	1 (3)

Quarterfinals
Carlos A. Mannucci	3	1	4
Willy Serrato	2	4	6
Sport Loreto	0	0	0
Unión Huaral	1	1	2
Alipio Ponce	2	2	4 (3)
Ecosem	2	2	4 (1)
San Simón	2	1	3 (4)
Saetas de Oro	1	2	3 (3)

Semifinals
Willy Serrato	1	0	1 (1)
Unión Huaral	0	1	1 (3)
Alipio Ponce	1	1	2
San Simón	4	1	5

Champion & Runner-Up
Unión Huaral	0	3	3
San Simón	2	2	4

=== Round of 16 ===
Team 1	Agg.	Team 2	1st leg	2nd leg
UD Chulucanas	1–2	Carlos A. Mannucci	0–1	1–1
Willy Serrato	3–3 (3–1 p)	Comerciantes Unidos	2–1	1–2
AIPSA	3–8	Sport Loreto	2–0	1–8
Unión Huaral	3–2	CNI	2–0	1–2
Alipio Ponce	3–3 (a)	Deportivo Municipal (Santillana)	1–0	2–3
Ecosem	3–2	San Ignacio	3–1	0–1
Binacional	1–2	San Simón	1–0	0–2
Saetas de Oro	1–1 (4–3 p)	Unión Fuerza Minera	1–0	0–1

=== Quarterfinals ===
Team 1	Agg.	Team 2	1st leg	2nd leg
Carlos A. Mannucci	4–6	Willy Serrato	3–2	1–4
Unión Huaral	2–0	Sport Loreto	1–0	1–0
Alipio Ponce	4–4 (3–1 p)	Ecosem	2–2	2–2
San Simón	3–3 (4–3 p)	Saetas de Oro	2–1	1–2

=== Semifinals ===
Team 1	Agg.	Team 2	1st leg	2nd leg
Unión Huaral	1–1 (4–1 p)	Willy Serrato	0–1	1–0
Alipio Ponce	2–5	San Simón	1–4	1–1

=== Final ===
Team 1	Agg.	Team 2	1st leg	2nd leg
Unión Huaral	3–4	San Simón	0–2	3–2

== See also ==
- 2013 Torneo Descentralizado
- 2013 Peruvian Segunda División
