= 2014 Copa Perú =

Copa Perú
- Season: 2014
- Champions: Sport Loreto (1st Title)

The 2014 Peru Cup season (Spanish: Copa Perú 2014), the promotion tournament of Peruvian football, started on February.

The tournament has 5 stages. The first four stages are played as mini-league round-robin tournaments, except for third stage in region IV, which is played as a knockout stage. The final stage features two knockout rounds and a final four-team group stage to determine the two promoted teams.

The 2014 Peru Cup started with the District Stage (Spanish: Etapa Distrital) on February. The next stage was the Provincial Stage (Spanish: Etapa Provincial) which started on June. The tournament continued with the Departamental Stage (Spanish: Etapa Departamental) on July. The Regional Stage follow in September. The National Stage (Spanish: Etapa Nacional) starts in November. The winner of the National Stage will be promoted to the First Division and the runner-up will be promoted to the Second Division.

== Departmental Stage ==
Departmental Stage: 2014 Ligas Departamentales del Peru and 2014 Ligas Superiores del Peru

The following list shows the teams that qualified for the Regional Stage.

Department	Team	Location
Amazonas	Bagua Grande	Utcubamba
Amazonas	Defensor Libertad	Bagua
Ancash	Sport Rosario	Ancash
Ancash	Universidad San Pedro	Ancash
Apurímac	Miguel Grau	Abancay
Apurímac	DECH	Andahuaylas
Apurímac	José María Arguedas	Andahuaylas
Arequipa	Futuro Majes	Caylloma
Arequipa	Sportivo Cariocos	Caylloma
Arequipa	Sportivo Huracán	Arequipa
Ayacucho	Percy Berrocal	Ayacucho
Ayacucho	Player Villafuerte	Ayacucho
Cajamarca	Bellavista	Jaén
Cajamarca	ADA	Jaén
Cajamarca	Academia Municipal	Jaén
Callao	ADEBAMI	Callao
Callao	América Latina	Callao
Cusco	Unión Alto Huarca	Cusco
Cusco	Deportivo Yawarmayu	Cusco
Huancavelica	Santa Rosa (H)	Huancavelica
Huancavelica	Social Lircay	Huancavelica
Huánuco	Chacarita Juniors	Huamalíes
Huánuco	Unión Tingo María	Leoncio Prado
Ica	Defensor Zarumilla	Nazca
Ica	Unión Progresista	Lucanas
Junín	Unión Pichanaki	Chanchamayo
Junín	Echa Muni	Junín
Junín	Sport Aguila	Junín

Department	Team	Location
La Libertad	Racing	Sánchez Carrión
La Libertad	Sport Chavelines	Pacasmayo
Lambayeque	La Nueva Alianza	Chiclayo
Lambayeque	Sport Boys (Tumán)	Chiclayo
Lima	Aurora Chancayllo	Huaral
Lima	Juventud América	Cañete
Loreto	CNI	Maynas
Loreto	San Francisco	Requena
Madre de Dios	Deportivo Maldonado	Puerto Maldonado
Madre de Dios	MINSA	Tambopata
Moquegua	Mariscal Nieto	Ilo
Moquegua	Deportivo Enersur	Ilo
Pasco	Ecosem	Pasco
Pasco	Sociedad Tiro 28	Pasco
Piura	Atlético Grau	Piura
Piura	Defensor La Bocana	Sechura
Puno	Unión Fuerza Minera	San Antonio de Putina
Puno	Binacional	Chucuito
San Martín	Unión César Vallejo	San Martín
San Martín	Atlético Nacional	San Martín
Tacna	San Pedro	Candarave
Tacna	Deportivo Credicoop	Tacna
Tumbes	Cristal Tumbes	Tumbes
Tumbes	Defensor Bolívar	Tumbes
Ucayali	Sport Loreto	Coronel Portillo
Ucayali	Santa Rosa (Pucallpa)	Coronel Portillo

== Regional Stage ==
Each region had two teams qualify for the next stage. The playoffs only determined the respective regional winners.

=== Region I ===
Region I includes qualified teams from Amazonas, Lambayeque, Tumbes and Piura region.

==== Group A ====
Pos	Team	Pld	W	D	L	GF	GA	GD	Pts	Qualification	BGR	DBO	GRA	LNA
1	Bagua Grande	6	5	0	1	15	6	+9	15	Región I - Semifinals		6–0	1–0	2–0
2	Defensor Bolívar	6	4	0	2	10	9	+1	12	Región I - Semifinals	4–0		2–1	1–0
3	Atlético Grau	5	2	0	3	6	7	−1	6		2–3	1–0		W.O.
4	La Nueva Alianza	5	0	0	5	2	11	−9	0		0–3	1–3	1–2	

Legend: Blue = home team win; Yellow = draw; Red = away team win.

==== Group B ====
Pos	Team	Pld	W	D	L	GF	GA	GD	Pts	Qualification	BOC	CTU	SBC	DLI
1	Defensor La Bocana	6	4	1	1	21	4	+17	13	Región I - Semifinals		2–0	3–0	11–1
2	Cristal Tumbes	6	4	1	1	13	6	+7	13	Región I - Semifinals	2–1		5–1	3–0
3	Sport Boys (Tumán)	5	1	0	4	5	13	−8	3		0–3	1–2		3–0
4	Defensor Libertad	5	0	2	3	3	19	−16	2		1–1	1–1	W.O.	

Legend: Blue = home team win; Yellow = draw; Red = away team win.

==== Semifinals ====
Team 1	Agg.	Team 2	1st leg	2nd leg
Bagua Grande	0–5	Cristal Tumbes	0–1	0–4
Defensor La Bocana	5–1	Defensor Bolívar	5–1	not played

* Defensor Bolívar were excluded from the second-leg of the semi-final against La Bocana due to unsportsmanlike conduct late in the first-leg.

=== Region II ===
Region II includes qualified teams from Ancash, Cajamarca, La Libertad and San Martín region.

==== Group A ====
Pos	Team	Pld	W	D	L	GF	GA	GD	Pts	Qualification	SRO	RAH	BDJ	UCV
1	Sport Rosario	6	3	2	1	14	11	+3	11	National stage		1–0	1–1	6–2
2	Racing	6	3	0	3	13	5	+8	9		5–0		5–0	3–1
3	Bellavista	6	2	2	2	8	14	−6	8		2–2	2–0		2–1
4	Unión César Vallejo	6	2	0	4	11	16	−5	6		1–4	1–0	5–1	

Legend: Blue = home team win; Yellow = draw; Red = away team win.

==== Group B ====
Pos	Team	Pld	W	D	L	GF	GA	GD	Pts	Qualification	CJU	USP	ADA	AMJ	ANC
1	Sport Chavelines	8	6	1	1	16	3	+13	19	National stage		2–1	3–0	3–0	3–0
2	Universidad San Pedro	8	5	2	1	15	2	+13	17		0–0		1–0	3–0	4–0
3	ADA	6	3	0	3	7	8	−1	9		1–0	0–3		W.O.	W.O.
4	Academia Municipal	6	0	2	4	3	13	−10	2		1–3	0–0	0–2		W.O.
5	Atlético Nacional	6	0	1	5	4	19	−15	1		0–2	0–4	2–4	2–2	

Legend: Blue = home team win; Yellow = draw; Red = away team win.

=== Region III ===
Region III includes qualified teams from Loreto and Ucayali region.

Pos	Team	Pld	W	D	L	GF	GA	GD	Pts	Qualification	LOR	SRCP	CNI	SFR
1	Sport Loreto	6	3	2	1	9	4	+5	11	National stage		4–1	3–0	0–0
2	Santa Rosa (Pucallpa)	6	2	3	1	8	7	+1	9	National stage	1–1		1–1	3–0
3	CNI	6	2	1	3	4	7	−3	7		2–0	0–1		0–2
4	San Francisco	6	1	2	3	3	6	−3	5		0–1	0–1	0–1	

Legend: Blue = home team win; Yellow = draw; Red = away team win.

=== Region IV ===
Region IV includes qualified teams from Lima and Callao region.

==== Semifinals ====
Team 1	Agg.	Team 2	1st leg	2nd leg
América Latina	1–7	Aurora Chancayllo	0–4	1–3
Juventud América	4–0	ADEBAMI	2–0	2–0

==== Regional Final ====
Team 1	Score	Team 2
Juventud América	1–3	Aurora Chancayllo

=== Region V ===
Region V includes qualified teams from Junín, Pasco and Huánuco region.

==== Group A ====
Pos	Team	Pld	W	D	L	GF	GA	GD	Pts	Qualification	UPI	ST28	CJH
1	Unión Pichanaki	4	2	1	1	11	3	+8	7	National stage		3–0	6–0
2	Sociedad Tiro 28	4	2	1	1	5	6	−1	7		2–1		1–1
3	Chacarita Juniors	4	0	2	2	3	10	−7	2		1–1	1–2	

Legend: Blue = home team win; Yellow = draw; Red = away team win.

==== Tiebreaker ====
Team 1	Score	Team 2
Sociedad Tiro 28	0–6	Unión Pichanaki

==== Group B ====
Pos	Team	Pld	W	D	L	GF	GA	GD	Pts	Qualification	SÁG	ECO	EMJ	UTM
1	Sport Águila	6	6	0	0	24	3	+21	18	National stage		4–0	6–0	3–0
2	Ecosem	6	3	1	2	17	10	+7	10		1–3		2–0	8–0
3	Echa Muni	6	2	1	3	10	16	−6	7		1–5	3–3		3–0
4	Unión Tingo María	6	0	0	6	1	23	−22	0		1–3	0–3	0–3	

Legend: Blue = home team win; Yellow = draw; Red = away team win.

=== Region VI ===
Region VI includes qualified teams from Ayacucho, Huancavelica and Ica region. Two teams qualified from this stage.

==== Group A ====
Pos	Team	Pld	W	D	L	GF	GA	GD	Pts	Qualification	DZA	SRH	PBE
1	Defensor Zarumilla	4	2	1	1	11	6	+5	7	National stage		6–1	4–3
2	Santa Rosa (H)	4	2	0	2	4	7	−3	6		1–0		2–0
3	Percy Berrocal	4	1	1	2	5	7	−2	4		1–1	1–0	

Legend: Blue = home team win; Yellow = draw; Red = away team win.

==== Group B ====
Pos	Team	Pld	W	D	L	GF	GA	GD	Pts	Qualification	PVI	UPR	SLI
1	Player Villafuerte	4	3	0	1	7	6	+1	9	National stage		4–3	2–1
2	Unión Progresista	4	2	0	2	9	7	+2	6		2–0		3–0
3	Social Lircay	4	1	0	3	4	7	−3	3		0–1	3–1	

Legend: Blue = home team win; Yellow = draw; Red = away team win.

==== Regional Final ====
Team 1	Score	Team 2
Defensor Zarumilla	5–2	Player Villafuerte

=== Region VII ===
Region VII includes qualified teams from Arequipa, Moquegua and Tacna region.

==== Group A ====
Pos	Team	Pld	W	D	L	GF	GA	GD	Pts	Qualification	SPC	CRD	DPE
1	Sportivo Cariocos	4	3	1	0	11	3	+8	10	Región VII - Semifinals		4–0	4–1
2	Deportivo Credicoop	4	0	3	1	5	7	−2	3	Región VII - Semifinals	1–1		2–2
3	Deportivo Enersur	4	0	2	2	6	12	−6	2		1–4	2–2	

Legend: Blue = home team win; Yellow = draw; Red = away team win.

==== Group B ====
Pos	Team	Pld	W	D	L	GF	GA	GD	Pts	Qualification	FMA	HUR	SPC	MNI
1	Futuro Majes	6	4	0	2	13	8	+5	12	Región VII - Semifinals		1–2	3–1	4–1
2	Sportivo Huracán	6	3	1	2	18	10	+8	10	Región VII - Semifinals	1–2		2–2	8–0
3	San Pedro	6	2	1	3	11	13	−2	7		1–2	2–3		2–1
4	Mariscal Nieto	6	2	0	4	9	20	−11	6		2–1	3–2	2–3	

Legend: Blue = home team win; Yellow = draw; Red = away team win.

==== Semifinals ====
Team 1	Agg.	Team 2	1st leg	2nd leg
Sportivo Huracán	5–6	Sportivo Cariocos	2–2	3–4
Futuro Majes	3–1	Deportivo Credicoop	2–1	1–0

==== Regional Final ====
Team 1	Score	Team 2
Sportivo Cariocos	3–1	Futuro Majes

=== Region VIII ===
Region VIII includes qualified teams from Apurimac, Cusco, Madre de Dios and Puno region.

==== Group A ====
Pos	Team	Pld	W	D	L	GF	GA	GD	Pts	Qualification	JMA	ECH	MGA	MIN	MLD
1	José María Arguedas	8	4	2	2	12	4	+8	14	Región VIII - Semifinals		1–0	3–1	3–0	3–0
2	DECH	8	4	1	3	12	7	+5	13	Región VIII - Semifinals	1–1		1–0	4–1	6–0
3	Miguel Grau	8	4	1	3	7	7	0	13		1–0	1–0		2–1	1–0
4	MINSA	8	3	2	3	9	13	−4	11		1–1	2–1	1–1		2–1
5	Deportivo Maldonado	8	2	0	6	5	16	−11	6		2–0	1–3	1–0	0–1	

Legend: Blue = home team win; Yellow = draw; Red = away team win.

==== Group B ====
Pos	Team	Pld	W	D	L	GF	GA	GD	Pts	Qualification	UAH	UFM	BIN	DPY
1	Unión Alto Huarca	6	3	2	1	7	4	+3	11	Región VIII - Semifinals		1–0	3–0	3–2
2	Unión Fuerza Minera	6	3	1	2	7	6	+1	10	Región VIII - Semifinals	0–0		2–1	3–2
3	Binacional	6	2	1	3	4	6	−2	7		0–0	1–0		2–0
4	Deportivo Yawarmayu	6	2	0	4	8	10	−2	6		2–0	1–2	1–0	

Legend: Blue = home team win; Yellow = draw; Red = away team win.

==== Semifinals ====
Team 1	Score	Team 2
Unión Alto Huarca	3–0	DECH
José María Arguedas	1–4	Unión Fuerza Minera

== National Stage ==
The National Stage starts on November. This stage has two knockout rounds and four-team group stage. The winner will be promoted to the 2015 Torneo Descentralizado and the runner-up of the National Stage will be promoted to the 2015 Peruvian Segunda División.

Round of 16
Defensor La Bocana	1	2	3
Sport Rosario	1	0	1
Sport Chavelines	2	1	3
Cristal Tumbes	0	4	4
Sport Loreto	3	2	5
Juventud América	0	2	2
Aurora Chancayllo	2	0	2
Santa Rosa (Pucallpa)	0	1	1
Sport Águila	2	2	4
Player Villafuerte	1	0	1
Defensor Zarumilla	2	0	2 (2)
Unión Pichanaki	0	2	2 (4)
Sportivo Cariocos	1	1	2
Unión Alto Huarca	1	0	1
Unión Fuerza Minera	5	3	8
Futuro Majes	0	1	1

Quarterfinals
Defensor La Bocana	2	2	4
Cristal Tumbes	0	1	1
Sport Loreto	1	0	1
Aurora Chancayllo	1	0	1
Sport Águila	1	2	3
Unión Pichanaki	2	0	2
Sportivo Cariocos	1	1	2
Unión Fuerza Minera	2	3	5

Semifinals
Defensor La Bocana	5	1	6
Sport Loreto	1	6	7
Sport Águila	3	1	4
Unión Fuerza Minera	6	2	8

Champion & Runner-Up
Sport Loreto	4	0	4
Unión Fuerza Minera	1	1	2

=== Round of 16 ===
Team 1	Agg.	Team 2	1st leg	2nd leg
Sport Rosario	1–3	Defensor La Bocana	1–1	0–2
Sport Chavelines	3–4	Cristal Tumbes	2–0	1–4
Sport Loreto	5–2	Juventud América	3–0	2–2
Aurora Chancayllo	2–1	Santa Rosa (Pucallpa)	2–0	0–1
Sport Águila	4–1	Player Villafuerte	2–1	2–0
Defensor Zarumilla	2–2 (2–4 p)	Unión Pichanaki	2–0	0–2
Sportivo Cariocos	2–1	Unión Alto Huarca	1–1	1–0
Unión Fuerza Minera	8–1	Futuro Majes	5–0	3–1

=== Quarterfinals ===
Team 1	Agg.	Team 2	1st leg	2nd leg
Defensor La Bocana	4–1	Cristal Tumbes	2–0	2–1
Sport Loreto	2–2 (a)	Aurora Chancayllo	1–1	0–0
Sport Águila	3–2	Unión Pichanaki	1–2	2–0
Sportivo Cariocos	2–5	Unión Fuerza Minera	1–2	1–3

=== Semifinals ===
Team 1	Agg.	Team 2	1st leg	2nd leg
Defensor La Bocana	6–7	Sport Loreto	5–1	1–6
Unión Fuerza Minera	8–4	Sport Águila	6–3	2–1

=== Final ===
Team 1	Agg.	Team 2	1st leg	2nd leg
Sport Loreto	4–2	Unión Fuerza Minera	4–1	0–1

== See also ==
- 2014 Torneo Descentralizado
- 2014 Peruvian Segunda División
