= José Manzaneda =

Peruvian footballer (born 1994)

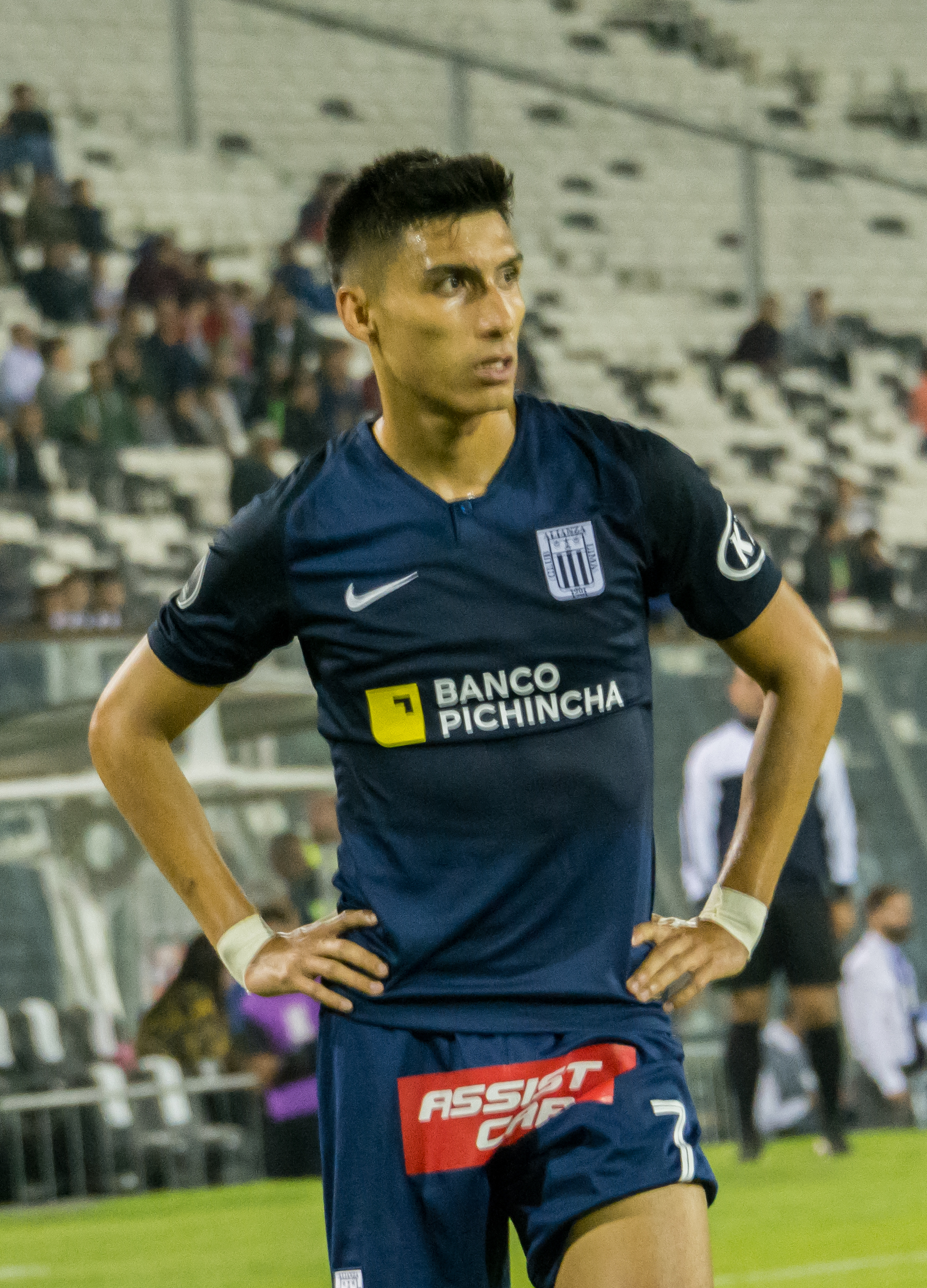
- Manzaneda in 2019

Personal information
- Full name: José Miguel Manzaneda Pineda
- Date of birth: 10 September 1994 (age 32)
- Place of birth: Lima, Peru
- Height: 1.81 m (5 ft 11 1/2 in)
- Position: Winger

Team information
- Current team: Los Chankas
- Number: 7

Youth career
- 2004–2010: Academia Zela
- 2010–2012: Academia Cantolao

Senior career*
Years	Team	Apps	(Gls)
2013–2015	Juan Aurich	12	(0)
2016–2018	Deportivo Municipal	32	(6)
2016–2017	→ Cantolao (loan)	63	(22)
2019-2021	Alianza Lima	28	(3)
2020	→ UCV (loan)	16	(1)
2022	Cantolao	33	(5)
2023	Alianza Atlético	28	(3)
2024-	Los Chankas	66	(15)

International career^{‡}
2015	Peru U22	1	(0)
2017–	Peru	1	(0)
- * Club domestic league appearances and goals as of 30 December 2025 ‡ National team caps and goals as of 6 October 2017

José Miguel Manzaneda Pineda (born 10 September 1994) is a Peruvian professional footballer who plays as a winger for Los Chankas.
