= Luis García (footballer, born 1988) =

Peruvian footballer

Luis Garcia
Personal information
- Full name: Luis Gabriel Garcia Uribe
- Date of birth: 5 June 1988 (age 38)
- Place of birth: Ica, Peru
- Height: 1.86 m (6 ft 1 in)
- Position: Midfielder

Team information
- Current team: Comerciantes Unidos
- Number: 12

Youth career
- Academia Cantolao

Senior career*
Years	Team	Apps	(Gls)
2008	FBC Melgar	3	(0)
2009–2010	San Martin	10	(0)
2010–2011	León de Huánuco	10	(0)
2011–2012	Blooming	10	(0)
2012–2013	Unión Comercio	42	(3)
2014	Universitario de Deportes	8	(0)
2015–2016	→ Deportivo Municipal (loan)	65	(6)
2017	FBC Melgar	30	(4)
2018	Real Garcilaso	16	(1)
2018	Sport Huancayo	5	(0)
2019–2021	Cienciano	42	(11)
2021	Carlos A. Mannucci	16	(0)
2022–2023	UTC	18	(2)
2023	Llacuabamba	23	(6)
2024	Deportivo Coopsol	20	(2)
2025–	Comerciantes Unidos	16	(0)

International career
2013	Peru	2	(0)
- * Club domestic league appearances and goals as of 30 December 2025

Luis Gabriel Garcia Uribe (born 5 June 1988) commonly known as Luis Garcia is a Peruvian football midfielder playing for Comerciantes Unidos.

== Club career ==
He has played for San Martin and León de Huánuco in the home league. In 2011-12 he played abroad in Bolivia in Blooming. In 2012, he returned to Peru to play for Unión Comercio.

== International career ==
On 27 March 2013 he made his debut for the national team against Trinidad and Tobago. In 46th minute he was replaced by Daniel Chavez
