= Racing de Huamachuco =

Racing
- Full name: Centro Cultural Deportivo Racing Club de Huamachuco
- Nickname: Las Águilas de Huamachuco
- Founded: 1946
- Ground: Estadio Municipal de Huamachuco, Huamachuco
- Capacity: 5,000
- Chairman: Willan Rondo Cuevas
- Manager: Yoni Villalobos
- League: Copa Perú
- 2021: Eliminated in the Regional Phase
| Home colours | Away colours |

Racing is a Peruvian football club, playing in the city of Huamachuco, Peru. The club was founded 1946 and plays in the Copa Perú which is the third division of the Peruvian league.

== History ==
In the 2014 Copa Perú, the club qualified to the Regional Stage, but was eliminated by Sport Rosario in the group stage.

In the 2015 Copa Perú, the club qualified to the National Stage, but was eliminated by DIM in the Round of 16.

In the 2016 Copa Perú, the club qualified to the National Stage - final stage, but was eliminated by Sport Rosario.

== Stadium ==
Racing play their home games in Estadio Municipal de Huamachuco in downtown Huamachuco, the stadium's capacity was expanded to 5,000.

== Honours ==
=== Regional ===
- Liga Departamental del La Libertad:

Winners (3): 2015, 2016, 2018
Runner-up (2): 1981, 2014

- Liga Provincial de Sánchez Carrión:

Winners (26): 1947, 1949, 1953, 1956, 1960, 1962, 1966, 1970, 1973, 1974, 1977, 1978, 1982, 1985, 1986, 1987, 1988, 1993, 1996, 2001, 2003, 2006, 2008, 2015, 2018, 2022
Runner-up (6): 2010, 2011, 2012, 2013, 2014, 2016

- Liga Distrital de Huamachuco:

Winners (4): 2010, 2015, 2018, 2022
Runner-up (2): 2013, 2014

== See also ==
- List of football clubs in Peru
- Peruvian football league system
