= Club Deportivo Alfredo Salinas =

Alfredo Salinas
- Full name: Club Deportivo Alfredo Salinas
- Short name: Alfredo Salinas
- Founded: 12 December 2011; 13 years ago
- Ground: Estadio Municipal de Espinar
- Capacity: 12,000
- President: Carlos Salinas Zapata
- Coach: José Soto
- League: Copa Perú
- 2018: Peruvian Segunda División, 14th (Relegated)
Home colours	Away colours

Club Deportivo Alfredo Salinas is a Peruvian football club from the Espinar District, Espinar Province, in Department of Cusco, Peru. It currently plays in the Peruvian Segunda División.

== History ==
It was founded in 2011 in honor of the deceased mayor of Espinar, Alfredo Salinas Pérez who died in an accident in 2008.

In 2015 it won the Liga Departamental de Cusco and made it to the semifinals of the 2015 Copa Perú national stage. Because of its good performance it was invited to play in the 2016 Peruvian Segunda División.

== Honours ==
=== Regional ===
- Liga Departamental del Cusco:

Winners (1): 2015

- Liga Provincial de Espinar:

Runner-up (1): 2015

- Liga Distrital de Yauri:

Winners (1): 2015
