= Adrián Zela =

Peruvian footballer (born 1989)

Personal information
- Full name: Adrián Zela Terry
- Date of birth: 20 March 1989 (age 37)
- Place of birth: Lima, Peru
- Height: 1.83 m (6 ft 0 in)
- Position: Defender

Senior career*
Years	Team	Apps	(Gls)
2007–2009	Coronel Bolognesi	33	(4)
2010	Universitario	10	(0)
2013	Lima Cricket		
2013	San Lorenzo de Porococha		
2014–2019	Deportivo Municipal	181	(12)
2020	Sport Boys	4	(0)
2020–2021	Chavelines	6	(0)
2021	Deportivo Binacional FC	11	(1)

International career^{‡}
2008	Peru U-20	3	(0)
2017–	Peru	1	(0)
- * Club domestic league appearances and goals as of 18 September 2021 ‡ National team caps and goals as of 15 November 2017

Adrián Zela Terry (Lima, Lima Province, Peru, 20 March 1989), is a former Peruvian footballer. He used to play in the position of defender for Esquela Municipal Deportivo Binacional until 2022. He is also the great-nephew of Alberto Terry.

== Club career ==
Zela came through the youth ranks of Alianza Lima. However, he did not make an appearance for their senior team. In mid-2007, Adrian joined Coronel Bolognesi. He made his senior club debut for them in 2008. In December 2009 was transferred to Club Universitario de Deportes.

In 2012, after Universitario, he moved back to Coronel Bolognesi. In 2014, he moved to Deportivo Municipal. After six years, in 2020, he moved to Sport Boys. In the same year, he moved from Sport Boys to Chavelines for the 2020/2021 season. In 2021, he moved from Chavelines to Deportivo Binacional.

Since 2022, he has been without a club having left Deportivo Binacional on 1 January 2022.

== Honours ==
Coronel Bolognesi:

- Torneo Clausura: 1

2007

Deportivo Municipal:

Segunda División Peruana 2014
