= Defensor La Bocana =

- Full name: Club Deportivo Defensor La Bocana
- Nickname(s): Maretazo Sechurano
- Founded: 29 June 1987; 37 years ago
- Ground: Estadio Sesquicentenario, Sechura
- Capacity: 7,000
- Chairman: (Peru) Eduardo Barrera López
- Manager: Álex Bartolo
- League: Copa Perú
Home colours	Away colours

Club Deportivo Defensor La Bocana is a Peruvian football club, playing in the city of Sechura, Piura, Peru.

== History ==
In the 2013 Copa Perú, the club qualified to the Regional Stage, but was eliminated by Willy Serrato in the semifinals.

In the 2014 Copa Perú, the club qualified to the National Stage, but was eliminated by Sport Loreto in the semifinals.

In the 2015 Copa Perú, the club qualified to the National Stage and were made champions by defeating Cantolao 4-3 on aggregate. With the win, Defensor La Bocana qualified directly to the top flight of Peruvian football the Torneo Descentralizado in 2016.

Their first season in the Torneo Descentralizado was also their last to date. Defensor La Bocana finished 16th in the overall table and was relegated to the Peruvian Segunda División for 2017.

== Honours ==
=== National ===
- Copa Perú:

Winners (1): 2015

=== Regional ===
- Región I:

Runner-up (1): 2014

- Liga Departamental de Piura:

Winners (3): 2013, 2014, 2015
Runner-up (1): 2022

- Liga Superior de Piura:

Winners (1): 2015

- Liga Provincial de Sechura:

Winners (4): 2013, 2014, 2019, 2022
Runner-up (1): 2012

- Liga Distrital de Sechura:

Winners (4): 2011, 2014, 2019, 2022
Runner-up (2): 2012, 2013

== See also ==
- List of football clubs in Peru
- Peruvian football league system
