= Academia Deportiva Cantolao =

Academia Cantolao
- Full name: Academia Deportiva Cantolao
- Nicknames: El Delfín; La Cantera del Perú
- Founded: 1981
- Stadium: Estadio Miguel Grau
- Chairman: Gisella Mandriotti
- Manager: Adrián Taffarel
- League: Liga 2
- 2023: Liga 1, 19th of 19 (relegated)
- Website: https://cantolaoperu.org/
Home colours	Away colours	Third colours

Academia Deportiva Cantolao is a Peruvian football club based in the city of Callao, Peru. However, the club is mostly known for its youth academy. Their football academy is considered one of the best in Peru. Academia Cantolao has educated many players who have gone on to play in the Torneo Descentralizado (Peruvian top-flight) and abroad, including many Peruvian international players. Probably their most recognized graduate is former Bayern Munich striker Claudio Pizarro, one of the greatest Peruvian players in history.

== History ==
=== Club ===
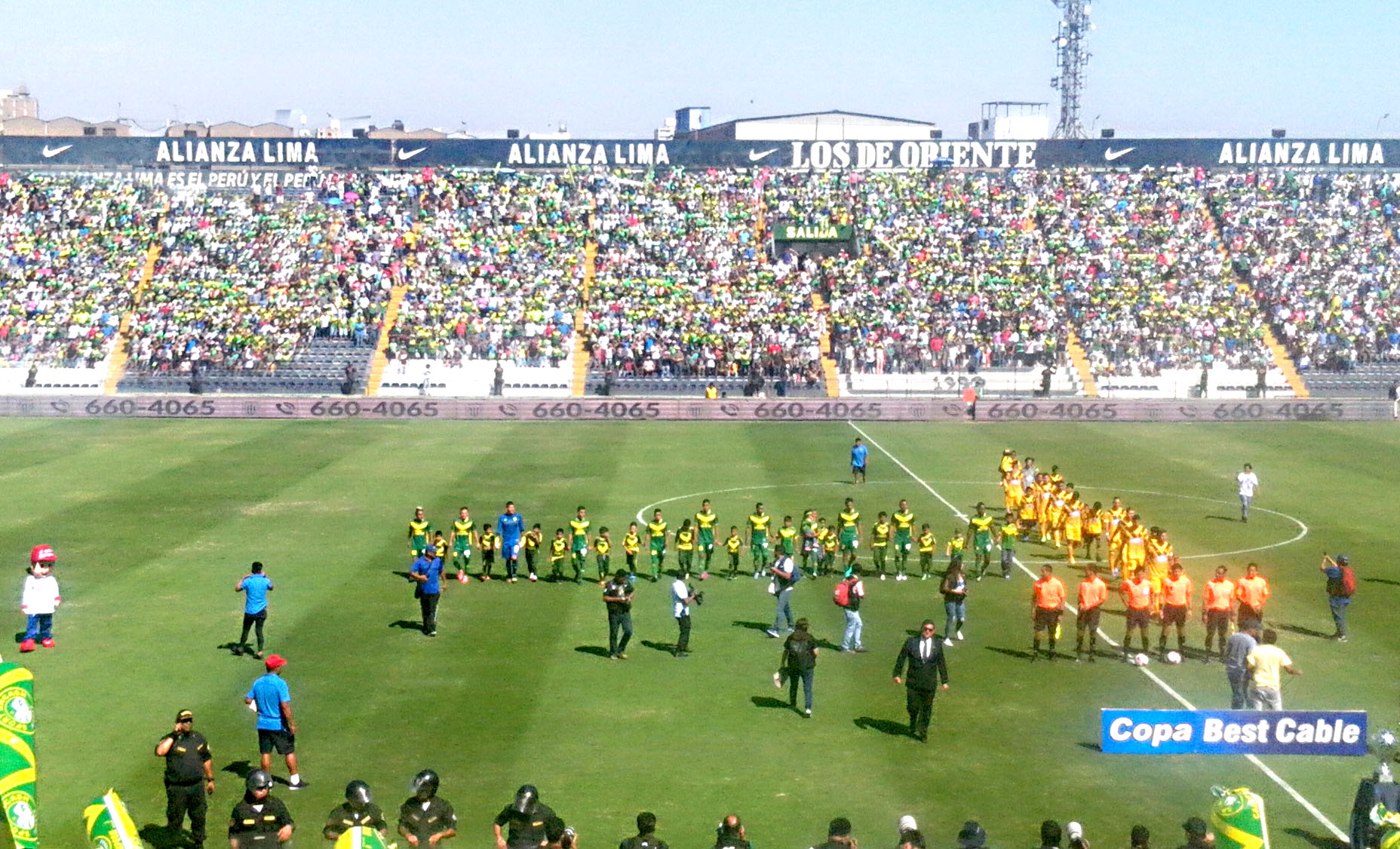
Cantolao won the 2016 play-off match final against Sport Áncash at Estadio Alejandro Villanueva

In the 1982 Copa Perú, the club qualified to the Final Stage, but was eliminated by Atlético Grau and Atlético Torino. In the 2015 Copa Perú, the club qualified to the final against Defensor La Bocana to whom they lost. They were promoted to the Peruvian Segunda División for the first time in the club's history. After only one year in the first division the club won the 2016 Peruvian Segunda División. They defeated Sport Áncash by 2–0 in a play-off final after tying at the end of the season for first place with 53 points each and thus qualified for the 2017 Torneo Descentralizado.

=== Youth academy ===
Academia Cantolao as a youth academy currently educates players ranging from the U-8 level up to U-20.

== Noted alumni ==
Player	Year of birth	Playing Position	National team	Years Played for National Team
Miguel Rebosio	1976	Centre back	Peru	1997–2005
Claudio Pizarro	1978	Striker	Peru	1999–2016
Carlos Lobatón	1980	Central Midfielder	Peru	2005–2016
Rainer Torres	1980	Central Midfielder	Peru	2005–present
Juan Carlos Mariño	1982	Attacking Midfielder	Peru	2006–present
Luis Ramírez	1984	Attacking Midfielder	Peru	2005–present
Junior Viza	1985	Attacking Midfielder	Peru	2006
Junior Ross	1986	Winger	Peru	2005–2013
Daniel Chávez	1988	Striker	Peru	2008–2015
Carlos Zambrano	1989	Centre back	Peru	2008–present
Reimond Manco	1990	Attacking Midfielder	Peru	2008–2013
Yoshimar Yotún	1990	Full back	Peru	2011–present

== Current squad ==
Note: Flags indicate national team as defined under FIFA eligibility rules; some limited exceptions apply. Players may hold more than one non-FIFA nationality.

No.	Pos.	Nation	Player
5	DF	URU	Facundo Moreira (Captain)
9	FW	ARG	Franco Pérez
10	MF	PER	Valentino Delgado
12	GK	PER	Ricardo Bettocchi
15	FW	PER	Jefferson Córdova
18	MF	PER	Jeamson Jiménez
24	MF	PER	Jean Lara
25	DF	PER	Álvaro Laura
27	FW	PER	Guillermo Oliva
32	MF	PER	Sidan Taype
34	FW	PER	OIiver López
36	MF	PER	Lionel Herrera
37	MF	PER	Robert Ardiles
41	GK	PER	Tiago Gatica
—	DF	PER	Rodrigo Valenzuela
—	MF	PER	Eliezer Crisóstomo
—	MF	PER	Farid Rojas

== Honours ==
=== Senior titles ===
Keys

- Record
- ^{(s)} Shared record

Type	Competition	Titles	Runner-up	Winning years	Runner-up years
National (League)	Segunda División	1	—	2016	—
National (League)	Copa Perú	—	1	—	2015
Regional (League)	Liga Departamental de Callao	2	—	1981, 2015	—
Regional (League)	Liga Distrital del Bellavista - La Perla	3	1	2006, 2014, 2015	1988
Regional (League)	Liga Distrital del Callao	1	—	1981	—

== Managers ==
- (Peru) Ronald Pitot (1981)
- (Peru) Rafael Castañeda (1982)
- (Peru) Luis Roth (1983)
- (Peru) Eloy Campos (1983)
- (Peru) Adrián Mendoza (1984)
- (Peru) Luis Roth (1985)
- (Peru) Teodoro Wuchi (1988-1989)
- (Peru) Eduardo Asca (1990)
- (Peru) Carlos Solís (1991-1992)
- (Peru) Agapito Rodríguez (1995)
- (Peru) Ramón Perleche (2013)
- (Peru) Mauro Pinedo (2013)
- (Spain) Iván Chaves (2014)
- (Peru) Álvaro Bonelli (2014)
- (Peru) Guillermo Esteves (2015)
- (Peru) Carlos Silvestri (2016-2018)
- (Peru) Guillermo Esteves (2018)
- (Peru) Jorge Araujo (2018-2019)
- (Argentina) Hernán Lisi (2020)
- (Peru) Jorge Espejo (2020-2021)
- (Peru) Carlos Silvestri (2021-2022)
- (Peru) Guillermo Esteves (2022)
- (Uruguay) Alejandro Apud (2022)
- (Uruguay) Matías Rosa (2023)
- (Peru) Ramón Perleche (2023)
- (Argentina) Edgardo Malvestiti (2023)
- (Argentina) Adrián Taffarel (2023)
- (Peru) Jersi Sócola (2023-)

== See also ==
- List of football clubs in Peru
- Peruvian football league system
