= Sport Loreto =

- Full name: Club Deportivo Sport Loreto
- Nickname: Decano
- Founded: September 3, 1939
- Ground: Estadio Aliardo Soria Pérez, Pucallpa
- Capacity: 25,000
- Chairman: Ricardo Mejia Sifuentes
- Manager: Carlos Galván
- League: Copa Perú
- 2019: Liga 2, 10th (relegated)
- Website: http://www.sportloreto.pe/
Home colours	Away colours

Sport Loreto is a local football institution located in Pucallpa, Peru. It was founded in 1939, and it will start playing in the first professional division in 2015. After the championship in Copa Peru 2014. Football is the most played sport, although there are other local sport as Volleyball that also participates in the National Championships. Another sport being played is Basketball. Football is being played at the local stadium Aliardo Soria.

== History ==
=== Foundation ===
Sport Loreto was founded in the city of Pucallpa on September 3, 1939, by a group of young men from Atahualpa Street. The club’s first president was Visitación Ríos, and its first headquarters was located at his residence on the corner of Atahualpa and Raimondi streets.

=== Copa Perú Title and Promotion to the First Division ===
Sport Loreto won the 2014 Copa Perú title after defeating Unión Fuerza Minera 4–1 in the first leg played in Pucallpa on December 15, 2014. In the return leg, played in Juliaca, Sport Loreto lost 1–0, but secured the championship on aggregate.

The achievement marked the return of a club from Pucallpa to the Peruvian Primera División after 17 years.

=== In the First Division (2015) ===
Sport Loreto began its professional era against Unión Comercio on Matchday 1 of the 2015 Torneo del Inca, suffering a 4–2 defeat. The club earned its first victory in the top flight after defeating Ayacucho FC 4–1.

However, Sport Loreto was relegated on the final matchday of the 2015 Torneo Descentralizado after losing 5–2 to Unión Comercio.

=== In the Second Division (2016–2019) ===
Sport Loreto made its debut in the Peruvian Second Division in 2016. Its first match ended in a 0–0 draw against Alfredo Salinas. The club finished the season in 10th place without a particularly notable campaign.

In 2017, despite starting the tournament strongly with a 3–0 victory over Serrato Pacasmayo, Sport Loreto once again ended the season in 10th place.

The 2018 season introduced a new competition format in which teams had to finish among the top eight to qualify for the knockout stage. However, Sport Loreto struggled throughout the campaign, beginning with a 4–1 defeat to Deportivo Hualgayoc and later suffering a heavy 7–2 loss to Juan Aurich. The club ultimately avoided relegation on the final matchday and finished 13th in the standings.

In 2019, Sport Loreto competed in the newly rebranded Liga 2. The club opened the season with a 1–0 defeat against newly promoted Santos FC and later fell into the relegation zone until Matchday 10, when Sport Victoria was disqualified, giving the club a better chance of survival. By the end of the first half of the season, Sport Loreto sat in 10th place.

Its campaign in the Copa Bicentenario was more encouraging. Drawn alongside Alianza Universidad and Unión Comercio, the club advanced to the Round of 16, where it was eliminated by Sport Huancayo after a 4–0 defeat. Despite a respectable cup run, poor results in the second half of the league campaign left the club dependent on other results, particularly those involving Cultural Santa Rosa. Ultimately, relegation was confirmed following a 2–0 loss to Cienciano, ending Sport Loreto’s four-year stay in the Second Division.

Following the cancellation of the Copa Perú in 2020, the club did not participate in the 2021 edition and has remained inactive in official competitions ever since.

== Rivalries ==
Sport Loreto has had a long-standing rivalry with Deportivo Bancos.

== Honours ==
=== Senior titles ===
Keys

- Record
- ^{(s)} Shared record

Type	Competition	Titles	Runner-up	Winning years	Runner-up years
National (League)	Copa Perú	1	—	2014	—
Regional (League)	Región III	2	—	2013, 2014	—
Regional (League)	Liga Departamental de Ucayali	3	—	2006, 2013, 2014	—
Regional (League)	Liga Departamental de Loreto	1	—	1973	—
Regional (League)	Liga Provincial de Coronel Portillo	5	2	1955, 1973, 1974, 2006, 2014	2012, 2013
Regional (League)	Liga Distrital de Callería	1	1	2012	2013

== See also ==
- List of football clubs in Peru
- Peruvian football league system
