= 2017 Club Universitario de Deportes season =

Universitario de Deportes
2017 season
- Manager: Roberto Challe; Pedro Troglio
- Stadium: Estadio Monumental
- Peruvian Primera División: 4th
- Copa Libertadores: Second stage
Home colours	Away colours

The 2017 season was Universitario de Deportes' 93rd season since its founding in 1924. The club played the Torneo Descentralizado and the Copa Libertadores.

== Competitions ==
=== Descentralizado ===
==== Torneo de Verano ====
Pos	Team	Pld	W	D	L	GF	GA	GD	Pts	Qualification	UTC	RGA	ALI	UNI	SHU	COM	MUN	JA
1	UTC	14	8	3	3	24	15	+9	27	Advance to Finals	—	—	—	2–1	—	—	—	—
2	Real Garcilaso	14	7	3	4	27	17	+10	24		—	—	—	3–1	—	—	—	—
3	Alianza Lima	14	6	5	3	22	15	+7	23		—	—	—	2–0	—	—	—	—
4	Universitario	14	5	4	5	19	18	+1	19		3–1	1–1	3–0	—	1–1	3–0	1–0	2–2
5	Sport Huancayo	14	5	3	6	19	23	−4	18		—	—	—	2–1	—	—	—	—
6	Comerciantes Unidos	14	5	3	6	18	22	−4	18		—	—	—	3–0	—	—	—	—
7	Deportivo Municipal	14	4	2	8	13	16	−3	14		—	—	—	1–2	—	—	—	—
8	Juan Aurich	14	2	5	7	15	31	−16	11		—	—	—	0–0	—	—	—	—

Source: ADFP
Legend: Blue = home team win; Yellow = draw; Red = away team win.
Rules for classification: 1) points; 2) goal difference; 3) goals scored; 4) draw.

==== Apertura ====
Pos	Team	Pld	W	D	L	GF	GA	GD	Pts
4	Sport Huancayo	15	7	5	3	23	16	+7	26
5	Universitario	15	7	5	3	20	14	+6	26
6	Deportivo Municipal	15	6	5	4	17	13	+4	23

Results

Home \ Away	AAS	ALI	AYA	CAN	COM	JA	MEL	MUN	RGA	SHU	SRO	CRI	UCO	USM	UTC	UNI
Alianza Atlético	—	—	—	—	—	—	—	—	—	—	—	—	—	—	—	—
Alianza Lima	—	—	—	—	—	—	—	—	—	—	—	—	—	—	—	—
Ayacucho	—	—	—	—	—	—	—	—	—	—	—	—	—	—	—	—
Cantolao	—	—	—	—	—	—	—	—	—	—	—	—	—	—	—	—
Comerciantes Unidos	—	—	—	—	—	—	—	—	—	—	—	—	—	—	—	—
Juan Aurich	—	—	—	—	—	—	—	—	—	—	—	—	—	—	—	1–1
Melgar	—	—	—	—	—	—	—	—	—	—	—	—	—	—	—	—
Deportivo Municipal	—	—	—	—	—	—	—	—	—	—	—	—	—	—	—	—
Real Garcilaso	—	—	—	—	—	—	—	—	—	—	—	—	—	—	—	—
Sport Huancayo	—	—	—	—	—	—	—	—	—	—	—	—	—	—	—	1–0
Sport Rosario	—	—	—	—	—	—	—	—	—	—	—	—	—	—	—	0–0
Sporting Cristal	—	—	—	—	—	—	—	—	—	—	—	—	—	—	—	1–1
Unión Comercio	—	—	—	—	—	—	—	—	—	—	—	—	—	—	—	1–2
Universidad San Martín	—	—	—	—	—	—	—	—	—	—	—	—	—	—	—	2–4
UTC	—	—	—	—	—	—	—	—	—	—	—	—	—	—	—	1–0
Universitario	1–1	1–2	2–0	2–1	1–0	—	2–1	1–1	2–1	—	—	—	—	—	—	—

Source: ADFP - official fixture
Legend: Blue = home team win; Yellow = draw; Red = away team win.

==== Clausura ====
Pos	Team	Pld	W	D	L	GF	GA	GD	Pts
3	Melgar	15	9	4	2	30	12	+18	31
4	Universitario	15	9	3	3	28	18	+10	29
5	Deportivo Municipal	15	6	5	4	23	20	+3	23

Results

Home \ Away	AAS	ALI	AYA	CAN	COM	JA	MEL	MUN	RGA	SHU	SRO	CRI	UCO	USM	UTC	UNI
Alianza Atlético	—	—	—	—	—	—	—	—	—	—	—	—	—	—	—	0–2
Alianza Lima	—	—	—	—	—	—	—	—	—	—	—	—	—	—	—	1–0
Ayacucho	—	—	—	—	—	—	—	—	—	—	—	—	—	—	—	3–3
Cantolao	—	—	—	—	—	—	—	—	—	—	—	—	—	—	—	1–0
Comerciantes Unidos	—	—	—	—	—	—	—	—	—	—	—	—	—	—	—	1–1
Juan Aurich	—	—	—	—	—	—	—	—	—	—	—	—	—	—	—	—
Melgar	—	—	—	—	—	—	—	—	—	—	—	—	—	—	—	2–0
Deportivo Municipal	—	—	—	—	—	—	—	—	—	—	—	—	—	—	—	3–5
Real Garcilaso	—	—	—	—	—	—	—	—	—	—	—	—	—	—	—	1–2
Sport Huancayo	—	—	—	—	—	—	—	—	—	—	—	—	—	—	—	—
Sport Rosario	—	—	—	—	—	—	—	—	—	—	—	—	—	—	—	—
Sporting Cristal	—	—	—	—	—	—	—	—	—	—	—	—	—	—	—	—
Unión Comercio	—	—	—	—	—	—	—	—	—	—	—	—	—	—	—	—
Universidad San Martín	—	—	—	—	—	—	—	—	—	—	—	—	—	—	—	—
UTC	—	—	—	—	—	—	—	—	—	—	—	—	—	—	—	—
Universitario	—	—	—	—	—	2–0	—	—	—	2–0	2–1	2–2	3–2	2–1	3–1	—

Source: ADFP - official fixture
Legend: Blue = home team win; Yellow = draw; Red = away team win.

=== Copa Libertadores ===
==== Second stage ====
2 February 2017	Deportivo Capiatá (Paraguay)	1–3	(Peru) Universitario	Estadio Lic. Erico Galeano Segovia, Capiatá
21:15 UTC−3	Gamarra 69'	Report	Gómez 14'; Rengifo 29'; Manicero 82'	Attendance: 12,000; Referee: Omar Ponce (Ecuador)

9 February 2017	Universitario (Peru)	0–3	(Paraguay) Deportivo Capiatá	Estadio Monumental, Lima
19:15 UTC−5		Report	Gamarra 13', 34'; Pérez 66'	Attendance: 25,000; Referee: Mauro Vigliano (Argentina)
