= 2017 FBC Melgar season =

FBC Melgar
2017 season
- Manager: Juan Reynoso (Start Season until 1 October 2017); Enrique Meza (2 October 2017 until End Season)
- Stadium: Monumental Virgen de Chapi; Estadio Melgar
- Torneo Descentralizado: Torneo de Verano: First (1°) Group 3 and Final Champion; Torneo Apertura: Nineth (9°); Torneo Clausura: Third (3°); Aggregate Table: Third (3°); Third National (3°)
- Copa Libertadores: Group stage Fourth (4°), Group 3
- Top goalscorer: League: Emanuel Herrera (13); All: Emanuel Herrera (17); Omar Fernández (13); Patricio Arce (9); Ysrael Zuñiga (8)
- Biggest win: 5–2 vs Academia Cantolao Torneo Clausura Match 9 (21 October 2017, Home); 4–0 vs Sport Huancayo Torneo Clausura Match 15 (3 December 2017, Home)
- Biggest defeat: 4–0 vs Emelec Copa Libertadores Match 6 Group 3 (25 May 2017, Away)
Home colours	Away colours	Third colours

The 2017 FBC Melgar season were the One-Hundred-Third (103.º) of the club from its foundation in 1915, Forty-Eight (48) participations in the top-flight of Peruvian Primera División (of 101 Editions) with denomination Torneo Descentralizado. In Previous Season the club qualified as 1st Place Champion of the 2015 Torneo Descentralizado.

Melgar were a of sixteen (16) clubs in the Fifty-Second edition (52.º) Torneo Descentralizado, the competition most important of the Peruvian football. The club played the Peruvian Primera División and the Copa Libertadores for Fourth (4th) Time.

== Torneo de Verano ==
=== Group stage (Group 3) ===
Pos	Team	Pld	W	D	L	GF	GA	GD	Pts	Qualification	MEL	SRO	CRI	CAN	USM	AYA	UCO	AAS
1	Melgar	14	7	6	1	20	12	+8	27	Advance to Finals	—	0–0	2–2	0–0	2–1	2–2	3–0	2–1
2	Sport Rosario	14	6	6	2	13	7	+6	24		0–0	—	—	—	—	—	—	—
3	Sporting Cristal	14	6	4	4	27	16	+11	22		2–0	—	—	—	—	—	—	—
4	Cantolao	14	5	4	5	16	15	+1	19		1–1	—	—	—	—	—	—	—
5	Universidad San Martín	14	5	2	7	18	19	−1	17		1–2	—	—	—	—	—	—	—
6	Ayacucho	14	4	4	6	18	21	−3	16		1–3	—	—	—	—	—	—	—
7	Unión Comercio	14	4	4	6	16	20	−4	16		1–2	—	—	—	—	—	—	—
8	Alianza Atlético	14	3	2	9	10	28	−18	11		0–1	—	—	—	—	—	—	—

Source: ADFP
Legend: Blue = home team win; Yellow = draw; Red = away team win.
Rules for classification: 1) points; 2) goal difference; 3) goals scored; 4) draw.

=== Final Torneo de Verano ===
FBC Melgar won the cup after defeating UTC.

May 21, 2017 First Leg	Melgar	1–0	UTC	Estadio Monumental de la UNSA, Arequipa
16:00 PET	Omar Fernández 31'	report		Attendance: 11,168; Referee: Miguel Santiváñez

May 31, 2017 Second Leg	UTC	2–1 (3–4 p)	Melgar	Estadio Héroes de San Ramón, Cajamarca
14:30 PET	Gustavo Dulanto 7'; Donald Millán 40'	report	Emanuel Herrera 90'	Attendance: 10,242; Referee: Joel Alarcón
	Penalties
	Guerrero (penalty scored); Segura (penalty missed); Díaz (penalty scored); Dulanto (penalty scored); Millán (penalty missed)		(penalty missed) Fernández; (penalty scored) Barrientos; (penalty scored) Herrera; (penalty scored) Zuñiga; (penalty scored) Arce

== Torneo Apertura ==
Pos	Team	Pld	W	D	L	GF	GA	GD	Pts
8	Sport Rosario	15	5	6	4	16	18	−2	21
9	Melgar	15	5	4	6	19	18	+1	19
10	Universidad San Martín	15	5	4	6	25	26	−1	19

=== Results ===
Home \ Away	AAS	ALI	AYA	CAN	COM	JA	MEL	MUN	RGA	SHU	SRO	CRI	UCO	USM	UTC	UNI
Alianza Atlético	—	—	—	—	—	—	1–0	—	—	—	—	—	—	—	—	—
Alianza Lima	—	—	—	—	—	—	—	—	—	—	—	—	—	—	—	—
Ayacucho	—	—	—	—	—	—	1–2	—	—	—	—	—	—	—	—	—
Cantolao	—	—	—	—	—	—	0–0	—	—	—	—	—	—	—	—	—
Comerciantes Unidos	—	—	—	—	—	—	—	—	—	—	—	—	—	—	—	—
Juan Aurich	—	—	—	—	—	—	2–2	—	—	—	—	—	—	—	—	—
Melgar	—	1–0	—	—	1–1	—	—	1–1	—	—	—	4–1	2–1	2–3	2–0	—
Deportivo Municipal	—	—	—	—	—	—	—	—	—	—	—	—	—	—	—	—
Real Garcilaso	—	—	—	—	—	—	1–0	—	—	—	—	—	—	—	—	—
Sport Huancayo	—	—	—	—	—	—	2–0	—	—	—	—	—	—	—	—	—
Sport Rosario	—	—	—	—	—	—	2–1	—	—	—	—	—	—	—	—	—
Sporting Cristal	—	—	—	—	—	—	—	—	—	—	—	—	—	—	—	—
Unión Comercio	—	—	—	—	—	—	—	—	—	—	—	—	—	—	—	—
Universidad San Martín	—	—	—	—	—	—	—	—	—	—	—	—	—	—	—	—
UTC	—	—	—	—	—	—	—	—	—	—	—	—	—	—	—	—
Universitario	—	—	—	—	—	—	2–1	—	—	—	—	—	—	—	—	—

Source: ADFP - official fixture
Legend: Blue = home team win; Yellow = draw; Red = away team win.

== Torneo Clausura ==
Pos	Team	Pld	W	D	L	GF	GA	GD	Pts
2	Real Garcilaso	15	10	2	3	29	15	+14	32
3	Melgar	15	9	4	2	30	12	+18	31
4	Universitario	15	9	3	3	28	18	+10	29

=== Results ===
Home \ Away	AAS	ALI	AYA	CAN	COM	JA	MEL	MUN	RGA	SHU	SRO	CRI	UCO	USM	UTC	UNI
Alianza Atlético	—	—	—	—	—	—	—	—	—	—	—	—	—	—	—	—
Alianza Lima	—	—	—	—	—	—	2–1	—	—	—	—	—	—	—	—	—
Ayacucho	—	—	—	—	—	—	—	—	—	—	—	—	—	—	—	—
Cantolao	—	—	—	—	—	—	—	—	—	—	—	—	—	—	—	—
Comerciantes Unidos	—	—	—	—	—	—	1–1	—	—	—	—	—	—	—	—	—
Juan Aurich	—	—	—	—	—	—	—	—	—	—	—	—	—	—	—	—
Melgar	2–0	—	2–0	5–0	—	4–3	—	—	0–2	4–0	2–2	—	—	—	—	2–0
Deportivo Municipal	—	—	—	—	—	—	1–1	—	—	—	—	—	—	—	—	—
Real Garcilaso	—	—	—	—	—	—	—	—	—	—	—	—	—	—	—	—
Sport Huancayo	—	—	—	—	—	—	—	—	—	—	—	—	—	—	—	—
Sport Rosario	—	—	—	—	—	—	—	—	—	—	—	—	—	—	—	—
Sporting Cristal	—	—	—	—	—	—	1–2	—	—	—	—	—	—	—	—	—
Unión Comercio	—	—	—	—	—	—	0–2	—	—	—	—	—	—	—	—	—
Universidad San Martín	—	—	—	—	—	—	0–2	—	—	—	—	—	—	—	—	—
UTC	—	—	—	—	—	—	0–0	—	—	—	—	—	—	—	—	—
Universitario	—	—	—	—	—	—	—	—	—	—	—	—	—	—	—	—

Source: ADFP - official fixture
Legend: Blue = home team win; Yellow = draw; Red = away team win.

== Group stage ==
Pos	Team	Pld	W	D	L	GF	GA	GD	Pts
1	River Plate	6	4	1	1	14	9	+5	13
2	Emelec	6	3	1	2	8	5	+3	10
3	Independiente Medellín	6	3	0	3	8	8	0	9
4	Melgar	6	1	0	5	6	14	−8	3

=== Results ===
14 March 2017	Melgar (Peru)	1–0	(Ecuador) Emelec	Estadio Monumental de la UNSA, Arequipa
17:30 UTC−5	García 76'	Report		Attendance: 15,000; Referee: Sandro Ricci (Brazil)

13 April 2017	River Plate (Argentina)	4–2	(Peru) Melgar	Estadio Monumental Antonio Vespucio Liberti, Buenos Aires
21:00 UTC−3	I. Fernández 17'; Driussi 21', 66'; Martínez Quarta 26'	Report	Herrera 4', 24'	Attendance: 35,000; Referee: Raúl Orosco (Bolivia)

20 April 2017	Independiente Medellín (Colombia)	2–0	(Peru) Melgar	Estadio Atanasio Girardot, Medellín
19:00 UTC−5	Viola 12'; Mosquera 63'	Report		Attendance: 23,508; Referee: Leodán González (Uruguay)

26 April 2017	Melgar (Peru)	1–2	(Colombia) Independiente Medellín	Estadio Monumental de la UNSA, Arequipa
19:00 UTC−5	Herrera 69'	Report	Piedrahita 72'; Quintero 74'	Attendance: 15,000; Referee: Anderson Daronco (Brazil)

18 May 2017	Melgar (Peru)	2–3	(Argentina) River Plate	Estadio Monumental de la UNSA, Arequipa
19:00 UTC−5	O. Fernández 23'; Herrera 61'	Report	Alario 11'; Mayada 19'; I. Fernández 69'	Attendance: 10,000; Referee: Jesús Valenzuela (Venezuela)

25 May 2017	Emelec (Ecuador)	3–0	(Peru) Melgar	Estadio George Capwell, Guayaquil
17:30 UTC−5	Orejuela 27'; Quiñónez 49'; Angulo 78'	Report		Attendance: 20,000; Referee: Leodán González (Uruguay)

== See also ==
- FBC Melgar
- 2017 Torneo Descentralizado
- 2017 Torneo de Promoción y Reservas
