= Johan Madrid =

Peruvian footballer (born 1996)

Personal information
- Full name: Johan Arturo Alexander Madrid Reyes
- Date of birth: 26 November 1996 (age 29)
- Place of birth: Callao, Peru
- Height: 1.79 m (5 ft 10 in)
- Positions: Right back; centre back

Team information
- Current team: Cesar Vallejo
- Number: 32

Youth career
- 2014-2015: Sporting Cristal II

Senior career*
Years	Team	Apps	(Gls)
2015	Sporting Cristal II	0	(0)
2015	→ Cienciano (loan)	2	(0)
2016–2023	Sporting Cristal	151	(0)
2017	→ Sport Rosario (loan)	38	(2)
2023-2024	Cesar Vallejo	50	(1)
2025	Sport Huancayo	29	(0)
2026-	Cesar Vallejo	7	(0)

International career^{‡}
2018-	Peru	1	(0)
- * Club domestic league appearances and goals as of 28 December 2025 ‡ National team caps and goals as of 18:44, 6 January 2023 (UTC)

Johan Arturo Alexander Madrid Reyes (born 26 November 1996) is a Peruvian professional footballer who plays as a defender for Cesar Vallejo in the Peruvian Primera División.

== Club career ==
Madrid joined the youth set-up at Sporting Cristal in 2014. He won the Peruvian league with Sporting Cristal in 2016, 2018 and 2020. He also played for Cienciano and Sport Rosario on-loan from Sporting Cristal, in the Peruvian top division. After six seasons with Sporting Cristal he joined Cesar Vallejo in 2023.

== International career ==
On 17 August 2018, he was called up by Ricardo Gareca to the full international squad for friendly matches against Germany and Netherlands.

== Career statistics ==
Club	Division	League			Cup		Continental		Total	
Club	Division	Season	Apps	Goals	Apps	Goals	Apps	Goals	Apps	Goals
Cienciano	Peruvian Primera División	2015	2	0	-	-	-	-	2	0
Sporting Cristal	Peruvian Primera División	2018	34	0	-	-	2	0	36	0
Sporting Cristal	Peruvian Primera División	2019	26	0	2	0	6	0	34	0
Sporting Cristal	Peruvian Primera División	2020	27	0	-	-	2	0	29	0
Sporting Cristal	Peruvian Primera División	2021	25	0	4	0	7	0	36	0
Sporting Cristal	Peruvian Primera División	2022	34	0	-	-	6	0	40	0
Sporting Cristal	Peruvian Primera División	2023	4	0	-	-	1	0	5	0
Sporting Cristal	Total		150	0	6	0	24	0	180	0
Sport Rosario	Peruvian Primera División	2017	38	2	-	-	-	-	38	2
Career total			190	2	6	0	24	0	220	2
