= 2018 Peruvian Segunda División =

Peruvian Segunda División
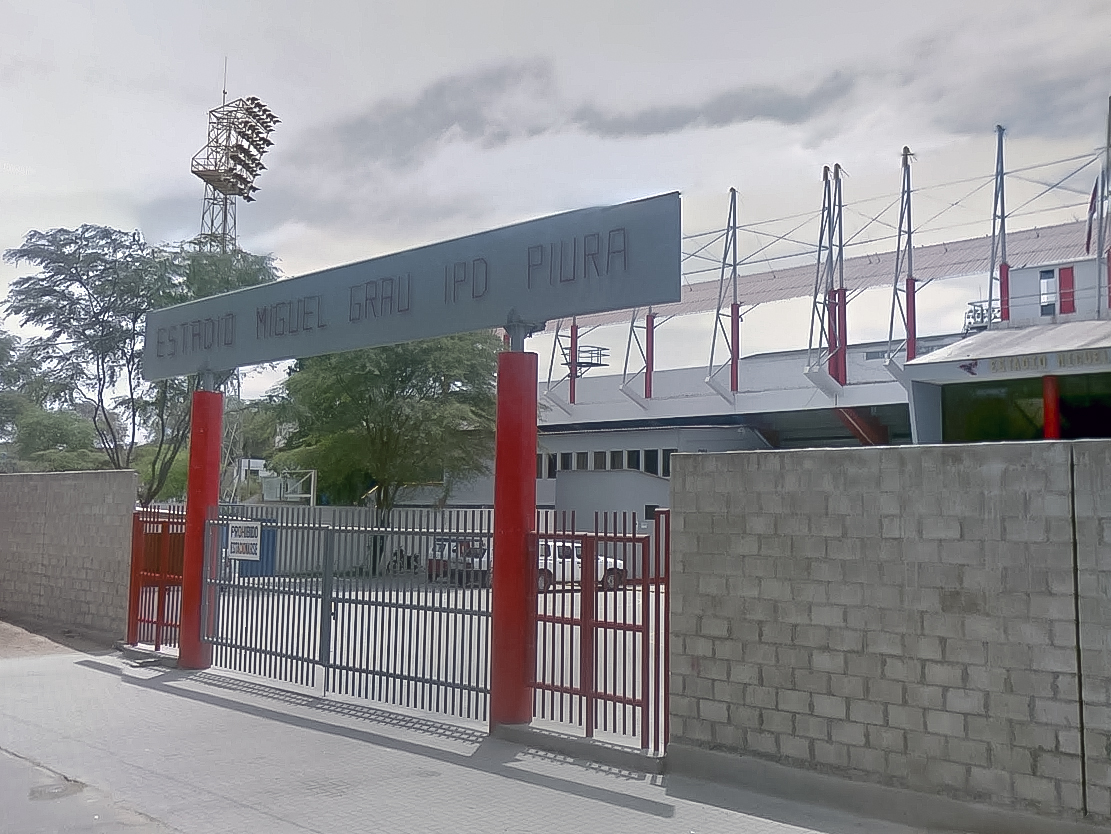
- Season: 2018
- Dates: 8 April – 2 December 2018
- Champions: Universidad César Vallejo
- Relegated: Alfredo Salinas; Serrato Pacasmayo
- Matches: 208
- Goals: 732 (3.52 per match)
- Top goalscorer: Jair Córdova (23 goals)
- Best goalkeeper: Juan Pretel
- Biggest home win: Unión Huaral 11–0 Serrato Pacasmayo (28 October)
- Biggest away win: Serrato Pacasmayo 0–8 Deportivo Coopsol (2 September)
- Highest scoring: Unión Huaral 11–0 Serrato Pacasmayo (28 October)
- Highest attendance: 32,308; Cienciano 2–0 Carlos A. Mannucci (11 November)
- Total attendance: 342,052
- Average attendance: 1,645

The 2018 Segunda División season, was the 66th edition of the second tier of Federación Peruana de Futbol. The tournament started on 8 April 2018 and ended on 2 December 2018.

== Competition modus ==
The season was divided into two phases, a home-and-away round-robin stage and a liguilla stage. The top seven teams at the end of the first stage moved on to liguilla. The first placed team received a bye to the semi-finals. The other six teams played quarter-final, two-leg matches. The semi-finals and final also played over two legs. The liguilla champion was promoted to the 2019 Torneo Descentralizado and the tournament championship.

== Teams ==
A total of 15 teams played in the league, including 12 sides from the 2017 season, two relegated from the 2018 Torneo Descentralizado and one promoted from the 2018 Copa Perú.

Juan Aurich, Alianza Atlético, and Atlético Grau debuted in their season in the second division of Peruvian football. The two relegated clubs were La Bocana and Sport Áncash who will play in the 2018 Copa Perú starting in the Departamental Stage.

=== Team changes ===
Promoted from 2017 Copa Perú	Relegated from 2017 Primera División	Promoted to 2018 Primera División	Relegated to 2018 Copa Perú
▲ Atlético Grau (2nd)	▼ Juan Aurich (15th) ▼ Alianza Atlético (16th)	▲ Sport Boys (1st)	▼ Defensor La Bocana (14th) ▼ Sport Áncash (15th)

=== Stadia and locations ===
Locations of the 2018 Segunda División teams

Team	City	Stadium	Capacity
Alfredo Salinas	Espinar	Municipal de Espinar	12,000
Alianza Atlético	Sullana	Campeones del 36	12,000
Atlético Grau	Piura	Miguel Grau	25,000
Carlos A. Mannucci	Trujillo	Mansiche	25,000
Cienciano	Cusco	Garcilaso	40,000
Cultural Santa Rosa	Andahuaylas	Monumental de Condebamba	10,000
Deportivo Coopsol	San Vicente de Cañete	Roberto Yáñez	5,000
Deportivo Hualgayoc	Hualgayoc	José Gálvez Egusquiza	2,000
Juan Aurich	Chiclayo	Municipal de la Juventud	2,000
Los Caimanes	Puerto Etén	Municipal de la Juventud	2,000
Serrato Pacasmayo	Pacasmayo	Carlos A. Olivares	2,000
Sport Loreto	Pucallpa	Aliardo Soria	25,000
Sport Victoria	Ica	José Picasso Peratta	8,000
Unión Huaral	Huaral	Julio Lores Colan	10,000
Universidad César Vallejo	Trujillo	Municipal de Casa Grande	8,000

== League table ==
=== Standings ===
Pos	Team	Pld	W	D	L	GF	GA	GD	Pts	Qualification
1	Universidad César Vallejo	28	19	5	4	55	19	+36	62	Advance to Liguilla
2	Carlos A. Mannucci	28	16	7	5	66	30	+36	55	Advance to Liguilla
3	Cienciano	28	17	4	7	63	30	+33	55	Advance to Liguilla
4	Unión Huaral	28	14	6	8	58	39	+19	48	Advance to Liguilla
5	Deportivo Hualgayoc (Note: Hualgayoc was disqualified from the play-off because of financial problems.)	28	13	9	6	49	38	+11	48	
6	Juan Aurich	28	14	5	9	51	27	+24	47	Advance to Liguilla
7	Alianza Atlético	28	14	5	9	48	37	+11	47	Advance to Liguilla
8	Atlético Grau	28	12	6	10	58	42	+16	42	Advance to Liguilla
9	Deportivo Coopsol	28	9	10	9	46	32	+14	37	
10	Cultural Santa Rosa	28	11	4	13	38	36	+2	37	
11	Los Caimanes	28	7	6	15	38	57	−19	27	
12	Sport Victoria	28	6	7	15	34	54	−20	25	
13	Sport Loreto	28	6	6	16	38	68	−30	24	
14	Alfredo Salinas (R)	28	5	6	17	25	66	−41	21	Relegation to 2019 Copa Perú
15	Serrato Pacasmayo (R)	28	2	4	22	23	115	−92	10	Relegation to 2019 Copa Perú

Source: ADFP-SD - official site
Rules for classification: 1) points; 2) goal difference; 3) goals scored; 4) draw.
(R) Relegated

== Results ==
Home \ Away	AAS	ASA	CAM	CIE	COO	CST	CAG	DHU	JA	CAI	SP	LOR	VIC	HUA	UCV
Alianza Atlético		1–0	1–1	0–4	1–0	4–0	3–2	1–0	2–1	1–2	8–0	2–1	4–2	2–1	2–4
Alfredo Salinas	2–0		3–2	0–5	3–0	1–3	1–1	0–6	3–0	5–1	2–1	1–1	1–1	0–3	0–3
Carlos A. Mannucci	2–1	2–1		5–0	2–2	3–1	4–1	4–0	1–1	3–1	8–0	1–0	6–1	3–4	2–3
Cienciano	1–1	1–0	0–0		2–1	4–0	1–1	5–0	1–0	4–1	9–1	5–0	1–0	2–1	0–4
Deportivo Coopsol	1–1	5–0	1–1	3–0		1–1	1–0	1–2	2–1	3–3	3–3	3–0	2–0	1–2	0–1
Cultural Santa Rosa	2–1	3–0	0–1	0–1	1–1		2–1	0–2	2–1	7–0	2–1	2–2	1–0	3–1	0–0
Atlético Grau	3–1	4–0	2–0	4–0	2–2	2–1		2–2	2–1	5–1	5–1	6–2	5–1	2–2	1–0
Deportivo Hualgayoc	0–0	1–0	2–0	1–4	1–0	1–0	0–3		1–1	2–1	6–2	4–1	2–2	6–2	0–0
Juan Aurich	0–1	5–0	4–1	1–0	2–0	0–1	1–0	4–0		1–1	1–0	6–3	1–1	1–0	2–0
Los Caimanes	0–2	1–1	0–3	1–1	0–1	3–0	2–1	0–1	1–1		3–0	2–0	1–0	1–2	2–4
Serrato Pacasmayo	3–0	1–1	0–1	0–7	0–8	0–6	1–3	1–1	0–4	0–4		1–4	3–1	2–2	0–3
Sport Loreto	1–2	5–0	1–2	0–1	2–2	1–0	1–1	2–2	2–7	4–3	2–1		0–0	2–1	0–4
Sport Victoria	0–3	1–1	1–5	2–1	0–2	1–0	3–2	2–2	0–1	2–2	8–1	2–1		3–2	0–1
Unión Huaral	2–2	3–2	1–1	1–0	1–0	1–0	4–0	1–1	1–0	2–1	11–0	5–0	1–0		1–1
Universidad César Vallejo	2–1	5–0	1–1	2–3	0–0	2–0	2–0	2–1	1–3	1–0	2–0	2–0	2–0	3–0	

Updated to match(es) played on 22 April 2018. Source: ADFP-SD - official site
Legend: Blue = home team win; Yellow = draw; Red = away team win.

== Liguilla ==
=== Bracket ===
Quarterfinals
4	Unión Huaral	1	2	3
6	Juan Aurich	3	1	4
2	Carlos A. Mannucci	1	5	6
8	Atlético Grau	1	2	3
3	Cienciano	1	3	4
7	Alianza Atlético	1	0	1

Semifinals
1	Universidad César Vallejo (s)	1	2	3
6	Juan Aurich	3	0	3
2	Carlos A. Mannucci	0	5	5
3	Cienciano	2	2	4

Final
1	Universidad César Vallejo	1	3	4
2	Carlos A. Mannucci	1	1	2

=== Quarterfinals ===
==== First leg ====
1 November 2018
13:00

Juan Aurich	3–1	Unión Huaral
Rick Campodónico 32'; Lucas Gómez 45+2' 76'		Víctor Eugenio 44'

Estadio Municipal de la Juventud, Chongoyape
Referee: Jesús Cartagena
1 November 2018
13:00

Alianza Atlético	1–1	Cienciano
Yan Carlos Martínez 90'		Danny Kong 90+1'

Estadio Campeones del 36, Sullana
Referee: José Martínez
1 November 2018
15:00

Atlético Grau	1–1	Carlos A. Mannucci
Yilbert Aponzá 32' (pen.)		Mario Tajima 73'

Estadio Miguel Grau, Piura
Referee: Kevin Ortega

==== Second leg ====
4 November 2018
15:30

Unión Huaral	2–1	Juan Aurich
Carlo Urquiaga 23'; Michael Guevara 65'		Josué Estrada 71'

Estadio Julio Lores Colan, Huaral
Referee: Kevin Ortega
4 November 2018
15:30

Cienciano	3–0	Alianza Atlético
Danny Kong 48' 83'; Waldir Castro 90'

Estadio Garcilaso, Cusco
Referee: Fernando Legario
4 November 2018
15:30

Carlos A. Mannucci	5–2	Atlético Grau
Osnar Noronha 9'; Breno Naranjo 11' 72'; Rely Fernández 36'; Ricardo Lagos 58'		Charles Adibe 55'; Felipe Mesones 68'

Estadio Mansiche, Trujillo
Referee: Augusto Ménendez

=== Semifinals ===
==== First leg ====
11 November 2018
13:00

Juan Aurich	3–1	Universidad César Vallejo
Javier Robles 35'; Lucas Gómez 78'; Lyc Sánchez 86'		Raziel García 28'

Estadio Municipal de la Juventud, Chongoyape
Referee: Michael Espinoza
11 November 2018
15:30

Cienciano	2–0	Carlos A. Mannucci
Danny Kong 13' 29'

Estadio Garcilaso, Cusco
Referee: Víctor Hugo Carrillo

==== Second leg ====
18 November 2018
15:00

Universidad César Vallejo	2–0	Juan Aurich
Álvaro Medrano 5' 22'

Estadio Municipal de Casa Grande, Casa Grande
Referee: Miguel Santiváñez
18 November 2018
15:30

Carlos A. Mannucci	5–2	Cienciano
Osnar Noronha 11' 53' 90+2'; Renzo Sheput 79'; Segundo Acevedo 86'		Aldair Ramos 24'; Matías Sen 90+7'

Estadio Mansiche, Trujillo
Referee: Diego Haro

=== Third-place play-off ===
25 November 2018
13:00

Juan Aurich	2–1	Cienciano
Alfredo Carrillo 11'; Ramón Rengifo 45'		Matías Sen 64'

Estadio Municipal de la Juventud, Chongoyape
Referee: Kevin Ortega
2 December 2018
15:00

Cienciano	3–1	Juan Aurich
Junior Viza 12'; Junior Ross 67'; Fernando Oliviera 81'		Éxar Rosales 54'

Estadio Garcilaso, Cusco
Referee: Augusto Menéndez

=== Final ===
25 November 2018
15:30

Carlos A. Mannucci	1–1	Universidad César Vallejo
Níger Vega 90+4'		Leandro Fleitas 74'

Estadio Mansiche, Trujillo
Referee: Joel Alarcón
2 December 2018
15:00

Universidad César Vallejo	3–1	Carlos A. Mannucci
Carlos Orejuela 43' 116'; Anthony Gordillo 108'		Camilo Jiménez 45+2'

Estadio Municipal de Casa Grande, Casa Grande
Referee: Víctor Hugo Carrillo

== Promotion play-off ==
Pos	Team	Pld	W	D	L	GF	GA	GD	Pts	Qualification
1	Carlos A. Mannucci	3	2	1	0	5	3	+2	7	2019 Liga 1
2	Alianza Universidad	3	1	2	0	5	3	+2	5	2019 Liga 1
3	Cienciano	3	1	1	1	4	4	0	4	2019 Liga 2
4	Santos	3	0	0	3	3	7	−4	0	2019 Liga 2

Rules for classification: 1) points; 2) goal difference; 3) goals scored; 4) draw.

== See also ==
- 2018 Torneo Descentralizado
- 2018 Copa Perú
