= Deportivo Hualgayoc =

Peruvian football club

- Full name: Club Social Cultural y Deportivo Hualgayoc
- Founded: 10 February 1992; 33 years ago
- Ground: José Gálvez Egúsquiza, Hualgayoc, Cajamarca
- Chairman: Napoleón Gil Gálvez
- Manager: Orlando Maltese
- League: Peruvian Segunda División
- 2018: Peruvian Segunda División, 5th
Home colours	Away colours

Club Social Cultural y Deportivo Hualgayoc is a Peruvian football club located in Hualgayoc, Cajamarca which currently plays in the Peruvian Segunda División.

== History ==
Deportivo Hualgayoc was founded in 1992 in Hualgayoc, Cajamarca by local businessmen and farmers. The team was very successful at a local level where it was either the district's champion or runner-up from 1992 to 1997. It reached the Provincial Stage for the first time in 1996. For financial reasons the club stopped competing after the 1997 season. In 2014, Napoleón Gil Gálvez, who was the club's first treasurer and now the current club president, became the mayor of Hualgayoc and promised to bring professional football to the district.

The club came back to competition led by Erick Torres in 2015 when it won the district and provincial tournaments in Hualgayoc. It became champion of the Departamental Stage to reach the Copa Perú national stage for the first time in its history. The club won the first leg against Cristal Tumbes 2–0 but lost 0–5 on the second leg and was eliminated from the tournament.

In 2016 with Torres still as coach it started its campaign from the Provincial Stage because of the previous year's performance. Deportivo Hualgayoc once more won both the Provincial and Departamental Stages to reach the National Stage for the second consecutive time in its history. The club reached La Finalísima or Final group stage after defeating Club José María Arguedas and EGB Tacna Heroica in the Round of 16 and quarterfinals respectively. Hualgayoc tied its first game against the eventual winner Sport Rosario 1–1 and then surprisingly defeated Racing de Huamachuco by 4–1 to reach the last match date as the favorite to win the tournament. The club lost against Binacional 0–1 and finished the tournament as runner-up after Sport Rosario defeated Racing de Huamanchuco 2–1 and thus gained the right to play in the 2017 Peruvian Segunda División.

== Colours and badge ==
Deportivo Hualgayoc's colours are blue for its home games and white with blue borders for its away games. The word "Hualgayoc" can usually be seeing in caps on the front side of the T-shirt.

Deportivo Hualgayoc's badge is the coat of arms of the Hualgayoc District which is an Andean condor as the single supporter wearing a crown with an escutcheon divided in three quarters superimposed in itself with a classic telstar pattern ball on its feet on a blue escutcheon with the initials "CSCD" on top and the word "Hualgayoc" on bottom.

== Stadium ==
Deportivo Hualgayoc plays their home matches at Estadio José Gálvez Egúsquiza in Hualgayoc, Cajamarca. The stadium is named in honor of the Peruvian war hero from the Battle of Callao.

== Noted managers ==
- Erick Torres (2015-2016)

== Honours ==
=== National ===
- Copa Perú:

Runners-up (1): 2016

=== Regional ===
- Liga Departamental de Cajamarca:

Winners (2): 2015, 2016

- Liga Provincial de Hualgayoc:

Winners (2): 2015, 2016
Runners-up (1): 1996

- Liga Distrital de Hualgayoc:

Winners (3): 1993, 1996, 2015
Runners-up (3): 1992, 1994, 1997
