= 2017 Peruvian Segunda División =

Peruvian Segunda División
- Season: 2017
- Dates: 22 April – 26 November 2017
- Champions: Sport Boys
- Relegated: Defensor La Bocana; Sport Áncash
- Matches: 210
- Goals: 725 (3.45 per match)
- Top goalscorer: Carlos López (24 goals)
- Biggest home win: UCV 8–1 ANC (Oct. 1); CIE 8–1 HUA (Oct. 29)
- Biggest away win: BOC 1–6 CAM (Jul. 2); SP 0–5 UCV (Oct. 8)
- Highest scoring: UCV 8–1 ANC (Oct. 1); CIE 8–1 HUA (Oct. 29); ASA 5–4 CAI (Oct. 21); UCV 7–2 ASA (Nov. 12)
- Highest attendance: 10,467; Sport Boys 0–0 Universidad César Vallejo (25 Jun. 2017)
- Total attendance: 372,234
- Average attendance: 1,772

The 2017 Segunda División season, also known as Copa Best Cable Perú 2017 for sponsorship reasons, was the 65th edition of the second tier of Federación Peruana de Futbol. The tournament will be played on a home-and-away round-robin basis. The tournament started on 22 April 2017 and it ended in November 2017. The fixtures were drawn on 6 April 2017.

== Teams ==
A total of 15 teams played in the league, one less than the previous season, including 12 sides from the 2016 season, two relegated from the 2016 Torneo Descentralizado and one promoted from the 2016 Copa Perú.

Universidad César Vallejo returns to the Second Division after an eight-year spell in the top flight. In turn, Defensor La Bocana was relegated to the Segunda Division after a short spell of one year. Deportivo Hualgayoc was promoted as the 2016 Copa Perú runner-up.

The teams which had been relegated from the Segunda División the previous season were Unión Tarapoto, who were relegated mid-season, and Atlético Torino. Alianza Universidad withdrew before the start of the season and was relegated to the Copa Perú. Kola San Martín, Deportivo Garcilaso, and León de Huánuco expressed interest in taking Alianza Universidad's slot in the tournament. Leon de Huanuco's appeal to the Court of Arbitration for Sport to return to the first division was denied and the Peruvian Football Federation relegated them to the 2017 Copa Perú's departmental stage. In the end, the Federation also decided to play the tournament with only 15 teams.

=== Team changes ===
Promoted from 2016 Copa Perú	Relegated from 2016 Primera División	Promoted to 2017 Primera División	Relegated to 2017 Copa Perú	Retired
▲ Deportivo Hualgayoc (2nd)	▼ Universidad César Vallejo (15th) ▼ Defensor La Bocana (16th)	▲ Academia Cantolao (1st)	▼ Atlético Torino (15th) ▼ Unión Tarapoto (16th)	▼ Alianza Universidad (Retired)

=== Stadia and locations ===
Locations of the 2017 Segunda División teams

Team	City	Stadium	Capacity
Alfredo Salinas	Espinar	Municipal de Espinar	12,000
Carlos A. Mannucci	Trujillo	Mansiche	25,000
Cienciano	Cusco	Garcilaso	40,000
Cultural Santa Rosa	Andahuaylas	Los Chankas	10,000
Defensor La Bocana	Sechura	Sesquicentenario	5,000
Deportivo Coopsol	Chancay	Rómulo Shaw Cisneros	13,000
Deportivo Hualgayoc	Hualgayoc	José Gálvez Egusquiza	2,000
Los Caimanes	Puerto Etén	Elias Aguirre	24,500
Serrato Pacasmayo	Pacasmayo	Carlos A. Olivares	2,000
Sport Áncash	Huaraz	Rosas Pampa	18,000
Sport Boys	Callao	Miguel Grau	15,000
Sport Loreto	Pucallpa	Aliardo Soria	25,000
Sport Victoria	Ica	José Picasso Peratta	8,000
Unión Huaral	Huaral	Julio Lores Colan	10,000
Universidad César Vallejo	Trujillo	Mansiche	25,000

== League table ==
=== Standings ===
Pos	Team	Pld	W	D	L	GF	GA	GD	Pts	Qualification or relegation
1	Universidad César Vallejo	28	16	9	3	76	29	+47	57	Title play-off
2	Sport Boys (C, O)	28	16	9	3	54	23	+31	57	Title play-off
3	Deportivo Hualgayoc	28	14	6	8	70	44	+26	48	
4	Unión Huaral	28	14	3	11	56	57	−1	45	
5	Cultural Santa Rosa	28	11	11	6	42	27	+15	44	
6	Cienciano	28	13	8	7	61	41	+20	43 (Note: Cienciano was docked a total of 4 points for outstanding debts with the SAFAP.)	
7	Carlos A. Mannucci	28	10	11	7	53	38	+15	41	
8	Deportivo Coopsol	28	9	11	8	48	46	+2	38	
9	Sport Victoria	28	10	7	11	36	44	−8	37	
10	Sport Loreto	28	9	6	13	39	48	−9	33	
11	Alfredo Salinas	28	7	10	11	41	56	−15	27 (Note: Alfredo Salinas was docked a total of 4 points for outstanding debts with the SAFAP.)	
12	Serrato Pacasmayo	28	6	6	16	33	68	−35	24	
13	Los Caimanes	28	8	4	16	41	59	−18	22 (Note: Los Caimanes was docked a total of 6 points for outstanding debts with the SAFAP.)	
14	Defensor La Bocana (R)	28	9	3	16	49	73	−24	16 (Note: La Bocana was docked a total of 16 points for outstanding debts with the SAFAP.)	2018 Copa Perú
15	Sport Áncash (R)	28	3	6	19	27	73	−46	13 (Note: Sport Ancash was docked a total of 2 points for outstanding debts with the SAFAP.)	2018 Copa Perú

Updated to match(es) played on 19 November 2017. Source: ADFP-SD - official site
Rules for classification: 1) points; 2) goal difference; 3) number of goals scored; 4) head-to-head record; 5) drawing of lots
(C) Champions; (O) Play-off winners; (R) Relegated

== Results ==
Home \ Away	ASA	CAM	CIE	COO	CST	DHU	BOC	CAI	ANC	SBA	LOR	VIC	HUA	UCV	SP
Alfredo Salinas		2–0	2–2	0–3	0–0	1–1	5–2	5–4	5–1	1–1	1–1	0–0	3–0	1–1	0–1
Carlos A. Mannucci	4–1		2–1	3–1	0–0	3–1	5–2	2–2	6–1	1–1	1–1	4–1	1–1	1–2	5–2
Cienciano	1–1	1–1		6–2	2–1	2–2	2–0	3–2	4–0	1–1	1–0	3–1	8–1	0–0	4–1
Deportivo Coopsol	0–2	2–2	2–2		0–0	4–2	2–0	1–1	1–1	0–2	3–2	0–2	4–1	2–1	1–1
Cultural Santa Rosa	1–0	1–0	1–1	3–1		2–0	6–1	1–0	2–2	0–0	4–0	4–1	0–0	1–1	4–2
Deportivo Hualgayoc	3–3	4–0	2–1	2–2	1–1		5–0	6–0	2–0	2–1	5–1	3–2	5–0	1–0	3–1
Defensor La Bocana	3–1	1–6	1–2	2–2	2–1	3–0		2–1	3–2	0–2	1–0	6–1	4–2	0–4	6–0
Los Caimanes	5–0	1–1	2–1	1–1	2–1	2–0	3–1		2–1	0–3	2–1	0–3	2–4	0–1	0–2
Sport Áncash	1–2	0–1	1–4	2–5	0–1	0–3	2–0	1–0		2–3	1–1	1–1	1–4	1–1	3–1
Sport Boys	4–0	0–0	1–2	2–2	1–0	3–2	5–1	3–1	6–0		3–2	2–0	2–1	0–0	1–1
Sport Loreto	3–1	0–0	3–4	2–1	0–0	1–3	3–0	3–1	2–2	2–1		1–0	2–3	2–1	3–0
Sport Victoria	1–1	2–0	2–1	1–1	2–0	2–1	1–1	0–3	1–0	0–1	1–0		2–0	1–1	4–1
Unión Huaral	4–1	3–2	2–0	0–1	2–4	5–3	3–2	2–1	3–0	0–1	2–0	6–2		0–4	3–0
Universidad César Vallejo	7–2	3–1	2–1	2–0	5–2	4–4	4–2	7–1	8–1	1–1	6–2	2–1	1–1		2–0
Serrato Pacasmayo	2–0	1–1	5–1	1–4	1–1	0–4	3–3	3–2	1–0	1–3	0–1	1–1	1–3	0–5	

Updated to match(es) played on 19 November 2017. Source: ADFP-SD - official fixture
Legend: Blue = home team win; Yellow = draw; Red = away team win.

== Title play-off ==
Because Sport Boys and Universidad César Vallejo finished the regular season with the same number of points, a title play-off match will be played on neutral ground to decide the champion and owner of the 2018 Torneo Descentralizado berth.

26 November 2017
14:45 PET

Sport Boys	1–1	Universidad César Vallejo
Ambriz 36'		Fleitas 50'
Penalties
Faiffer (penalty scored); Sheput (penalty scored); Seminario (penalty scored); Reátegui (penalty missed); Fano (penalty scored)	4–2	(penalty missed) Baylón; (penalty scored) Rostaing; (penalty scored) Ríos; (penalty missed) Olascuaga

Estadio Garcilaso, Cusco
Attendance: 974
Referee: Joel Alarcón

== Top goalscorers ==
Players sorted first by goals scored, then by last name.

Rank	Player	Club	Goals
1	(Colombia) Carlos López	Unión Huaral	24
2	(Peru) Andy Pando	Universidad César Vallejo	20
3	(Peru) César Zambrano	Deportivo Hualgayoc	14
4	(Peru) Danny Kong	Cultural Santa Rosa	12
4	(Brazil) Fernando Oliveira	Carlos A. Mannucci	12
5	(Colombia) Rafael Ágamez	Universidad César Vallejo	11
5	(Peru) Christopher Charún	Sport Áncash	11
5	(Peru) Guillermo Tomasevich	Sport Boys	11

Source: ADFP-SD, DeChalaca.com

== See also ==
- 2017 Torneo Descentralizado
- 2017 Copa Perú
- 2017 in Peruvian football
