= Jair Córdova =

Peruvian footballer (born 1996)

Personal information
- Full name: Jair Ayrton Córdova Carpio
- Date of birth: 18 August 1996 (age 30)
- Place of birth: Lima, Peru
- Height: 1.83 m (6 ft 0 in)
- Position: Forward

Team information
- Current team: Alianza Universidad

Senior career*
Years	Team	Apps	(Gls)
2016	Cienciano	5	(2)
2017–2018	Alianza Atlético	46	(24)
2019	Carlos A. Mannucci	1	(0)
2019	Juan Aurich	16	(9)
2020	Alianza Universidad	0	(0)
2020	Cavalry FC	4	(1)
2021–	Alianza Universidad	0	(0)
- * Club domestic league appearances and goals as of 18 December 2020

Jair Ayrton Córdova Carpio (born 18 August 1996) is a Peruvian professional footballer who plays as a forward for Alianza Universidad.

== Club career ==
=== Cienciano ===
In 2016, Córdova played for Peruvian Liga 2 side Cienciano, making five appearances and scoring two goals.

=== Alianza Atlético ===
In 2017, Córdova signed for Peruvian Liga 1 side Alianza Atlético. That season, he made nineteen appearances and scored one goal as the club was relegated. The following season in Liga 2, Córdova made 27 appearances and scoring 23 goals, winning the league golden boot. He made one additional appearance in the league playoffs.

=== Carlos A. Mannucci ===
On 5 January 2019, Córdova signed with Liga 1 side Carlos A. Mannucci. After making one appearance, he left the club in early 2019.

=== Juan Aurich ===
On 21 May 2019, Córdova signed with Liga 2 side Juan Aurich. That season, he made sixteen league appearances, scoring nine goals and added another goal in two playoff appearances.

=== Alianza Universidad ===
On 19 December 2019, Córdova signed with Liga 1 side Alianza Universidad.

=== Cavalry FC ===
On 22 January 2020, Córdova signed with Canadian Premier League side Cavalry FC, after the Canadian club activated his release clause. Shortly after arriving in Canada, Córdova would be forced to enter quarantine due to the COVID-19 pandemic, and would miss further time due to an ankle sprain suffered before the start of the 2020 season. Following the 2020 season, Córdova and the club would mutually agree to part ways, as he would move back to Peru to be closer to family.

=== Return to Alianza Universidad ===
On 6 December 2020, Córdova re-signed with his previous club, Alianza Universidad.

== Career statistics ==
As of 16 September 2020

Club statistics
Club	Season	League			National Cup		Other (Note: Includes appearances in the Liga 2 Playoffs.)		Total	
Club	Season	Division	Apps	Goals	Apps	Goals	Apps	Goals	Apps	Goals
Cienciano	2016	Peruvian Segunda División	5	2	—		0	0	5	2
Alianza Atlético	2017	Peruvian Primera División	19	1	—		0	0	19	1
Alianza Atlético	2018	Peruvian Segunda División	27	23	—		1	0	28	23
Alianza Atlético	Total		46	24	0	0	1	0	47	23
Carlos A. Mannucci	2019	Peruvian Primera División	1	0	—		0	0	1	0
Juan Aurich	2019	Peruvian Segunda División	16	9	—		2	1	18	10
Cavalry FC	2020	Canadian Premier League	4	1	—		0	0	4	1
Alianza Universidad	2021	Peruvian Primera División	0	0	—		0	0	0	0
Career total			72	36	0	0	3	1	75	37

== Honours ==
Individual

- Liga 2 Top Scorer: 2018
