= 2007 Club Universitario de Deportes season =

Universitario de Deportes
2007 season
- Manager: Edgar Ospina; Julio Gomez; Ricardo Gareca
- Stadium: Estadio Monumental
- Peruvian Primera División: 4th
- Copa Sudamericana: First stage
- Top goalscorer: Johan Fano (18)
Home colours	Away colours

The 2007 season was Universitario de Deportes' 83rd season since its founding in 1924. The club played the Descentralizado and the Copa Sudamericana.

== Competitions ==
=== Descentralizado ===
==== Apertura ====
Pos	Team	Pld	W	D	L	GF	GA	GD	Pts
4	Sport Boys	22	9	7	6	33	29	+4	34
5	Universitario	22	9	5	8	31	31	0	32
6	Alianza Lima	22	9	8	5	31	23	+8	31

Results

Home \ Away	AAS	ALI	CIE	BOL	DMU	MEL	ÁNC	SBA	CRI	TCL	USM	UNI
Alianza Atlético												
Alianza Lima												1–2
Cienciano												0–1
Coronel Bolognesi												2–3
Deportivo Municipal												2–1
Melgar												2–1
Sport Áncash												1–0
Sport Boys												1–1
Sporting Cristal												3–1
Total Clean												1–2
Universidad San Martín												2–2
Universitario	3–1	1–2	1–0	4–0	0–2	1–0	0–0	3–3	3–1	1–1	0–3	

Updated to match(es) played on November 3, 2007. Source: Peruvian Football Apertura 2007 Fixture
Legend: Blue = home team win; Yellow = draw; Red = away team win.

==== Clausura ====
Pos	Team	Pld	W	D	L	GF	GA	GD	Pts
1	Coronel Bolognesi	22	10	6	6	27	15	+12	36
2	Universitario	22	9	8	5	27	22	+5	35
3	Cienciano	22	10	4	8	35	28	+7	34

Results

Home \ Away	AAS	ALI	CIE	BOL	DMU	MEL	ÁNC	SBA	CRI	TCL	USM	UNI
Alianza Atlético												0–0
Alianza Lima												1–1
Cienciano												2–3
Coronel Bolognesi												0–0
Deportivo Municipal												3–2
Melgar												0–1
Sport Áncash												2–1
Sport Boys												1–1
Sporting Cristal												1–0
Total Clean												0–1
Universidad San Martín												0–2
Universitario	0–0	1–3	2–1	1–1	2–1	2–2	1–2	3–1	2–1	1–0	0–0	

Updated to match(es) played on December 10, 2007. Source: Peruvian Football Clausura 2007 Fixture
Legend: Blue = home team win; Yellow = draw; Red = away team win.

=== Copa Sudamericana ===
==== First stage ====
Universitario	0–1	Atlético Nacional	Lima, Peru
		Humberto Mendoza 28'	Stadium: Estadio Monumental

Atlético Nacional	1–0	Universitario	Medellín, Colombia
Carmelo Valencia 77'			Stadium: Atanasio Girardot
