= 2016 Copa Perú =

Copa Perú
- Season: 2016
- Champions: Sport Rosario

The 2016 Peru Cup season (Spanish: Copa Perú 2016), the largest amateur tournament of Peruvian football, started in February.

This edition has featured a change, with the elimination of the Regional Stage and the inclusion of participants from all the Regions of Peru in the National Stage. Under the new format, the tournament has four stages. The first three stages are played as mini-league round-robin tournaments, and the fourth stage is played under POT System intellectual property of the MatchVision company.

The creator of this format is the Chilean Leandro A. Shara

The 2016 Peru Cup started with the District Stage (Spanish: Etapa Distrital) in February. The next stage was the Provincial Stage (Spanish: Etapa Provincial) which started in June. The tournament continued with the Departmental Stage (Spanish: Etapa Departamental) in July. The National Stage (Spanish: Etapa Nacional) starts in September. The winner of the National Stage will be promoted to the First Division and the runner-up will be promoted to the Second Division.

== Departmental stage ==
Departmental Stage: 2016 Ligas Departamentales del Peru and 2016 Ligas Superiores del Peru

The following list shows the teams that qualified for the National Stage.

Department	Team	Location
Amazonas	Unión Santo Domingo	Chachapoyas
Amazonas	Higos Urco	Chachapoyas
Ancash	Sport Rosario	Huaraz
Ancash	DELUSA	Casma
Apurímac	José María Arguedas	Andahuaylas
Apurímac	La Victoria	Abancay
Arequipa	La Colina	Caylloma
Arequipa	Binacional	Arequipa
Ayacucho	Deportivo Municipal (Pichari)	VRAEM
Ayacucho	Sport Huanta	Huanta
Cajamarca	Coopac NSR	Cajabamba
Cajamarca	Deportivo Hualgayoc	Hualgayoc
Callao	Sport Blue Rays	Callao
Callao	Cultural Peñarol	Carmen de la Legua Reynoso
Cusco	Deportivo Garcilaso	Cusco
Cusco	Juventus Mollepata	Anta
Huancavelica	UDA	Huancavelica
Huancavelica	Cultural Bolognesi	Huancavelica
Huánuco	Mariano Santos	Leoncio Prado
Huánuco	Cultural Tarapacá	Huánuco
Ica	Carlos Orellana	Ica
Ica	Octavio Espinosa	Ica
Junín	Sport Águila	Huancayo
Junín	Alipio Ponce	Satipo
La Libertad	Racing	Sánchez Carrión
La Libertad	Sport Chavelines	Pacasmayo

Department	Team	Location
Lambayeque	Pirata	Chiclayo
Lambayeque	La Nueva Alianza	Chiclayo
Lima	DIM	Lima
Lima	Venus	Huaura
Loreto	Estudiantil CNI	Maynas
Loreto	Kola San Martín	Maynas
Madre de Dios	MINSA	Tambopata
Madre de Dios	Deportivo Maldonado	Puerto Maldonado
Moquegua	Deportivo Enersur	Ilo
Moquegua	Marsical Nieto	Ilo
Pasco	Deportivo Municipal (Oxapampa)	Oxapampa
Pasco	Sport Ticlacayán	Pasco
Piura	Atlético Grau	Piura
Piura	San Antonio	Piura
Puno	Unión Fuerza Minera	Putina
Puno	Credicoop San Román	San Román
San Martín	San José de Agua Blanca	San Martín
San Martín	Unión César Vallejo	San Martín
Tacna	Coronel Bolognesi	Tacna
Tacna	Bentín Tacna Heroica	Tacna
Tumbes	Cristal Tumbes	Tumbes
Tumbes	Comercial Aguas Verdes	Zarumilla
Ucayali	Defensor Neshuya	Padre Abad
Ucayali	UNU	Coronel Portillo

== National stage ==
In 2016 the National Stage has grown to 50 teams, and the new National Stage, designed by matchVision, is played under Regional using the POT System, with all the Regions of Peru represented. The National Stage starts in the first week of September.

This phase features the 50 teams that qualified from the Departmental Stage. Each team plays 3 games at home and 3 games away, for a total of 6 games against 3 different geographical rivals. The departmental stage winners only play against departmental runners-up, and vice versa. All the teams are positioned in one general table. After 6 matches, the team in places 1 to 8 are qualified directly to the Round of 16, while the teams in places 9 to 24 will play the Repechage phase. The teams in places 25 to 50 are eliminated.

The winner of the National Stage will be promoted to the 2017 Torneo Descentralizado and the runner-up of the National Stage will be promoted to the 2017 Peruvian Segunda División.

=== Tie-breaking criteria ===
The ranking of teams in the Unique Table is based on the following criteria:
1. Number of Points
2. Number of Relative Points, which are calculated by multiplying the points obtained against each rival with the total points obtained by this rival.
3. Goal difference
4. Number of goals scored
5. Better performance in away matches based on the following criteria:
1. Number of Away Points
2. Number of Away Relative Points
3. Goal Difference in away games
4. Number of goals scored in away games
6. Number of First-Half points: considering the half-time results as the final results
7. Drawing of lots

=== League table ===
Pos	Team	Pld	W	D	L	GF	GA	GD	Pts	Qualification
1	Carlos Orellana	6	5	1	0	11	4	+7	16	Round of 16
2	Binacional	6	4	2	0	13	5	+8	14	Round of 16
3	Sport Aguila	6	4	2	0	13	3	+10	14	Round of 16
4	Deportivo Garcilaso	6	4	2	0	8	1	+7	14	Round of 16
5	Sport Rosario	6	4	1	1	13	7	+6	13	Round of 16
6	Kola San Martín	6	4	1	1	19	10	+9	13	Round of 16
7	Comercial Aguas Verdes	6	4	1	1	16	6	+10	13	Round of 16
8	Deportivo Hualgayoc	6	4	1	1	18	9	+9	13	Round of 16
9	José María Arguedas	6	4	1	1	8	3	+5	13	Repechage
10	Bentín Tacna Heroica	6	4	1	1	11	9	+2	13	Repechage
11	UDA	6	4	0	2	20	11	+9	12	Repechage
12	Venus	6	4	0	2	21	6	+15	12	Repechage
13	Credicoop San Román	6	3	2	1	10	3	+7	11	Repechage
14	Pirata	6	3	2	1	10	7	+3	11	Repechage
15	Octavio Espinosa	6	3	2	1	9	5	+4	11	Repechage
16	San José de Agua Blanca	6	3	2	1	12	8	+4	11	Repechage
17	Cultural Tarapacá	6	3	2	1	11	7	+4	11	Repechage
18	DIM	6	3	1	2	5	5	0	10	Repechage
19	Sport Huanta	6	3	1	2	12	7	+5	10	Repechage
20	Estudiantil CNI	6	3	1	2	16	11	+5	10	Repechage
21	Racing	6	3	1	2	7	5	+2	10	Repechage
22	Unión Santo Domingo	6	3	1	2	12	8	+4	10	Repechage
23	Unión Fuerza Minera	6	3	1	2	13	4	+9	10	Repechage
24	MINSA	6	3	1	2	5	7	−2	10	Repechage
25	Coopac NSR	6	3	0	3	10	10	0	9	Ligas Distritales
26	Deportivo Municipal (Oxapampa)	6	3	0	3	9	13	−4	9	Ligas Distritales
27	Atlético Grau	6	2	3	1	10	7	+3	9	Ligas Distritales
28	San Antonio	6	2	3	1	16	7	+9	9	Ligas Distritales
29	UNU	6	3	0	3	19	9	+10	9	Ligas Distritales
30	Alipio Ponce	6	2	2	2	12	12	0	8	Ligas Distritales
31	Mariscal Nieto	6	2	2	2	10	11	−1	8	Ligas Distritales
32	Sport Blue Rays	6	2	2	2	2	5	−3	8	Ligas Distritales
33	Coronel Bolognesi	6	2	1	3	12	13	−1	7	Ligas Distritales
34	DELUSA	6	2	1	3	9	10	−1	7	Ligas Distritales
35	Sport Ticlacayán	6	2	0	4	11	12	−1	6	Ligas Distritales
36	Sport Chavelines	6	1	2	3	8	12	−4	5	Ligas Distritales
37	Unión César Vallejo	6	1	2	3	7	9	−2	5	Ligas Distritales
38	Mariano Santos	6	1	2	3	7	15	−8	5	Ligas Distritales
39	La Victoria	6	1	2	3	8	9	−1	5	Ligas Distritales
40	Higos Urco	6	1	1	4	6	16	−10	4	Ligas Distritales
41	La Colina	6	1	1	4	11	14	−3	4	Ligas Distritales
42	Deportivo Municipal (Pichari)	6	1	1	4	8	16	−8	4	Ligas Distritales
43	La Nueva Alianza	5	1	1	3	11	16	−5	4	Ligas Distritales
44	Deportivo Enersur	6	0	3	3	1	9	−8	3	Ligas Distritales
45	Juventus Mollepata	6	1	0	5	2	8	−6	3	Ligas Distritales
46	Deportivo Maldonado	6	0	1	5	2	16	−14	1	Ligas Distritales
47	Cultural Bolognesi	6	0	0	6	3	21	−18	0	Ligas Distritales
48	Cultural Peñarol	6	0	0	6	1	19	−18	0	Ligas Distritales
49	Defensor Neshuya	6	0	0	6	2	21	−19	0	Ligas Distritales
50	Cristal Tumbes	5	0	0	5	5	27	−22	0	Ligas Distritales

Updated to match(es) played on 2016. Source: ADFP-SD - official site
Rules for classification: 1) points; 2) goal difference; 3) number of goals scored; 4) head-to-head record; 5) drawing of lots

==== Round 1 ====
Team 1	Score	Team 2
Sport Blue Rays	0–0	Octavio Espinosa
Sport Rosario	2–0	DIM
Estudiantil CNI	0–0	Unión César Vallejo
José María Arguedas	1–1	Sport Huanta
Carlos Orellana	2–1	Cultural Bolognesi
Deportivo Municipal (Pichari)	1–1	La Victoria
Atlético Grau	3–1	Comercial Aguas Verdes
Pirata	2–0	San Antonio
Coronel Bolognesi	3–1	Mariscal Nieto
Unión Fuerza Minera	0–1	Binacional
Deportivo Enersur	0–0	Credicoop San Román
Sport Águila	2–0	Sport Ticlacayán
UDA	3–0	Alipio Ponce
Deportivo Municipal (Oxapampa)	2–0	Cultural Tarapacá
Cristal Tumbes	2–4	La Nueva Alianza
Defensor Neshuya	1–4	Kola San Martín
Venus	5–1	Cultural Peñarol
San José de Agua Blanca	2–0	Sport Chavelines
La Colina	2–3	Bentín Tacna Heroica
MINSA	1–0	Juventus Mollepata
Racing	2–0	DELUSA
Deportivo Hualgayoc	3–0	Higos Urco
Deportivo Garcilaso	4–1	Deportivo Maldonado
Mariano Santos	2–0	UNU
Unión Santo Domingo	2–0	Coopac NSR

==== Round 2 ====
Team 1	Score	Team 2
La Nueva Alianza	1–1	Deportivo Hualgayoc
Binacional	4–1	Coronel Bolognesi
Cultural Tarapacá	2–1	Defensor Neshuya
DIM	2–0	Sport Blue Rays
Cultural Peñarol	0–2	Carlos Orellana
Sport Ticlacayán	4–1	Venus
Higos Urco	0–0	Atlético Grau
Coopac NSR	3–0	Racing
Juventus Mollepata	0–2	José María Arguedas
Deportivo Enersur	1–1	Bentín Tacna Heroica
Credicoop San Román	4–0	MINSA
San Antonio	4–0	Cristal Tumbes
Octavio Espinosa	2–1	Deportivo Municipal (Pichari)
Sport Huanta	3–1	UDA
Deportivo Maldonado	0–2	Unión Fuerza Minera
Kola San Martín	2–1	San José de Agua Blanca
Mariscal Nieto	3–2	La Colina
Alipio Ponce	3–1	Deportivo Municipal (Oxapampa)
Sport Chavelines	3–3	Sport Rosario
Unión César Vallejo	1–1	Unión Santo Domingo
La Victoria	0–0	Deportivo Garcilaso
Cultural Bolognesi	0–2	Sport Águila
Comercial Aguas Verdes	1–0	Pirata
DELUSA	3–0	Mariano Santos
UNU	2–4	Estudiantil CNI

==== Round 3 ====
Team 1	Score	Team 2
Sport Rosario	2–0	DELUSA
Defensor Neshuya	0–4	UNU
Deportivo Municipal (Pichari)	2–1	Sport Huanta
Unión Santo Domingo	5–1	Higos Urco
Atlético Grau	1–1	San Antonio
Pirata	3–2	La Nueva Alianza
Mariano Santos	1–1	Cultural Tarapacá
Deportivo Garcilaso	1–0	Juventus Mollepata
MINSA	1–0	Deportivo Maldonado
Unión Fuerza Minera	2–0	Credicoop San Román
Coronel Bolognesi	3–1	Bentín Tacna Heroica
Sport Águila	1–1	Alipio Ponce
Deportivo Enersur	0–0	Mariscal Nieto
La Colina	1–1	Binacional
Deportivo Hualgayoc	3–1	Coopac NSR
Sport Blue Rays	1–0	Cultural Peñarol
Venus	2–0	DIM
San José de Agua Blanca	3–1	Unión César Vallejo
Carlos Orellana	0–0	Octavio Espinosa
José María Arguedas	2–0	La Victoria
UDA	6–0	Cultural Bolognesi
Deportivo Municipal (Oxapampa)	1–0	Sport Ticlacayán
Estudiantil CNI	0–2	Kola San Martín
Racing	2–0	Sport Chavelines
Cristal Tumbes	2–9	Comercial Aguas Verdes

==== Round 4 ====
Team 1	Score	Team 2
DELUSA	2–3	Sport Rosario
UNU	7–0	Defensor Neshuya
Sport Huanta	4–0	Deportivo Municipal (Pichari)
Higos Urco	2–1	Unión Santo Domingo
San Antonio	2–2	Atlético Grau
La Nueva Alianza	2–3	Pirata
Cultural Tarapacá	2–2	Mariano Santos
Juventus Mollepata	0–2	Deportivo Garcilaso
Deportivo Maldonado	1–2	MINSA
Credicoop San Román	2–1	Unión Fuerza Minera
Bentín Tacna Heroica	2–1	Coronel Bolognesi
Alipio Ponce	1–1	Sport Águila
Mariscal Nieto	3–0	Deportivo Enersur
Binacional	4–1	La Colina
Coopac NSR	3–1	Deportivo Hualgayoc
Cultural Peñarol	0–1	Sport Blue Rays
DIM	1–0	Venus
Unión César Vallejo	1–2	San José de Agua Blanca
Octavio Espinosa	2–3	Carlos Orellana
La Victoria	1–2	José María Arguedas
Cultural Bolognesi	0–2	UDA
Sport Ticlacayán	7–1	Deportivo Municipal (Oxapampa)
Kola San Martín	3–7	Estudiantil CNI
Sport Chavelines	2–0	Racing
Comercial Aguas Verdes	2–0	Cristal Tumbes

==== Round 5 ====
Team 1	Score	Team 2
Deportivo Hualgayoc	7–2	La Nueva Alianza
Coronel Bolognesi	1–2	Binacional
Defensor Neshuya	0–4	Cultural Tarapacá
Sport Blue Rays	0–0	DIM
Carlos Orellana	2–0	Cultural Peñarol
Venus	5–0	Sport Ticlacayán
Atlético Grau	4–1	Higos Urco
Racing	3–0	Coopac NSR
José María Arguedas	1–0	Juventus Mollepata
Deportivo Enersur	0–1	Bentín Tacna Heroica
MINSA	0–0	Credicoop San Román
Cristal Tumbes	1–8	San Antonio
Deportivo Municipal (Pichari)	1–2	Octavio Espinosa
UDA	3–2	Sport Huanta
Unión Fuerza Minera	7–0	Deportivo Maldonado
San José de Agua Blanca	1–1	Kola San Martín
La Colina	3–0	Mariscal Nieto
Deportivo Municipal (Oxapampa)	3–1	Alipio Ponce
Sport Rosario	2–0	Sport Chavelines
Unión Santo Domingo	1–0	Unión César Vallejo
Deportivo Garcilaso	1–0	La Victoria
Sport Águila	5–1	Cultural Bolognesi
Pirata	1–1	Comercial Aguas Verdes
Mariano Santos	2–3	DELUSA
Estudiantil CNI	3–0	UNU

==== Round 6 ====
Team 1	Score	Team 2
Octavio Espinosa	3–0	Sport Blue Rays
DIM	2–1	Sport Rosario
Unión César Vallejo	4–2	Estudiantil CNI
Sport Huanta	1–0	José María Arguedas
Cultural Bolognesi	1–2	Carlos Orellana
La Victoria	6–3	Deportivo Municipal (Pichari)
Comercial Aguas Verdes	2–0	Atlético Grau
San Antonio	1–1	Pirata
Mariscal Nieto	1–1	Coronel Bolognesi
Binacional	1–1	Unión Fuerza Minera
Credicoop San Román	4–0	Deportivo Enersur
Sport Ticlacayán	0–2	Sport Águila
Alipio Ponce	6–3	UDA
Cultural Tarapacá	2–1	Deportivo Municipal (Oxapampa)
La Nueva Alianza	–	Cristal Tumbes
Kola San Martín	7–0	Defensor Neshuya
Cultural Peñarol	0–8	Venus
Sport Chavelines	3–3	San José de Agua Blanca
Bentín Tacna Heroica	3–2	La Colina
Juventus Mollepata	2–1	MINSA
DELUSA	1–1	Racing
Higos Urco	2–3	Deportivo Hualgayoc
Deportivo Maldonado	0–0	Deportivo Garcilaso
UNU	6–0	Mariano Santos
Coopac NSR	4–2	Unión Santo Domingo

=== Repechage ===
Team 1	Agg.	Team 2	1st leg	2nd leg
Unión Santo Domingo	6–6	San José de Agua Blanca	3–0	3–6
DIM	2–2	Octavio Espinosa	1–0	1–2
Racing	4–3	Pirata	4–0	0–3
MINSA	0–4	Credicoop San Román	0–2	0–2
Venus	2–1	Estudiantil CNI	1–0	1–1
Cultural Tarapacá	3–7	UDA	2–3	1–4
Unión Fuerza Minera	1–3	Bentín Tacna Heroica	0–0	1–3
Sport Huanta	2–5	José María Arguedas	2–2	0–3

=== Bracket ===
Round of 16
Carlos Orellana	3	2	5
San José de Agua Blanca	3	1	4
Binacional	2	3	5
Octavio Espinosa	1	1	2
Comercial Aguas Verdes	1	1	2
Bentín Tacna Heroica	3	0	3
Deportivo Hualgayoc	0	5	5
José María Arguedas	1	3	4
Sport Águila	0	2	2
Racing	4	0	4
Deportivo Garcilaso	0	3	3
Credicoop San Román	0	1	1
Sport Rosario	2	6	8
Venus	1	2	3
Kola San Martín	3	0	3
UDA	0	3	3

Quarterfinals
Carlos Orellana	3	1	4
Binacional	6	0	6
Bentín Tacna Heroica	2	2	4
Deportivo Hualgayoc	2	6	8
Racing	1	4	5
Deportivo Garcilaso	0	0	0
Sport Rosario	1	4	5
Kola San Martín	0	3	3

Semifinals
Binacional
Deportivo Hualgayoc
Racing
Sport Rosario

Champion & Runner-Up
Hualgayoc
Sport Rosario

=== Round of 16 ===
Team 1	Agg.	Team 2	1st leg	2nd leg
San José de Agua Blanca	4–5	Carlos Orellana	3–3	1–2
José María Arguedas	3–5	Deportivo Hualgayoc	1–0	2–5
Venus	3–8	Sport Rosario	1–2	2–6
Credicoop San Román	1–3	Deportivo Garcilaso	0–0	1–3
Octavio Espinosa	2–5	Binacional	1–2	1–3
Bentín Tacna Heroica	3–2	Comercial Aguas Verdes	3–1	0–1
Racing	4–2	Sport Águila	4–0	0–2
Kola San Martín	3–3	UDA	3–0	0–3

=== Quarterfinals ===
Team 1	Agg.	Team 2	1st leg	2nd leg
Binacional	6–4	Carlos Orellana	6–3	0–1
Kola San Martín	3–5	Sport Rosario	0–1	3–4
Racing	5–0	Deportivo Garcilaso	1–0	4–0
Bentín Tacna Heroica	4–8	Deportivo Hualgayoc	2–2	2–6

=== Final group stage ===
The final group stage, colloquially known as La Finalísima, will be played by the four semifinalist at the Estadio Nacional in Lima. The team with the most points will be declared the winner and be promoted to the 2017 Torneo Descentralizado. The runner-up will be promoted to the 2017 Peruvian Segunda División. The draw for this stage of the tournament took place 30 November 2016 at the Peruvian Football Federation's headquarters.

Pos	Team	Pld	W	D	L	GF	GA	GD	Pts	Promotion
1	Sport Rosario	3	2	1	0	6	4	+2	7	2017 Torneo Descentralizado
2	Deportivo Hualgayoc	3	1	1	1	5	3	+2	4	2017 Segunda División
3	Binacional	3	1	0	2	3	4	−1	3	
4	Racing	3	1	0	2	3	6	−3	3	

==== Round 1 ====
3 December 2016	Sport Rosario	1–1	Deportivo Hualgayoc	Estadio Nacional, Lima
18:00 PET (UTC-05:00)	Rosario 36'	Report	Martínez 15'	Referee: Micke Palomino

3 December 2016	Binacional	0–1	Racing	Estadio Nacional, Lima
20:00 PET (UTC-05:00)			Jáuregui 13'	Referee: Ramón Blanco

==== Round 2 ====
7 December 2016	Sport Rosario	3–2	Binacional	Estadio Nacional, Lima
18:00 PET (UTC-05:00)	Galliquio 5'; Conde 23'; Aspilcueta 73' (o.g.)	Report	Carnero 7' (pen.), 43'	Referee: Iván Chang

7 December 2016	Deportivo Hualgayoc	4–1	Racing	Estadio Nacional, Lima
20:00 PET (UTC-05:00)	Vílchez 8' (pen.); Carillo 23'; Carillo 31'; Vílchez 58'	Report	Jáuregui 29' (pen.)	Referee: Roberto Mauro

==== Round 3 ====
10 December 2016	Deportivo Hualgayoc	0–1	Binacional	Estadio Nacional, Lima
18:00 PET (UTC-05:00)			Merino 84' (o.g.)	Referee: Fernando Legario

10 December 2016	Sport Rosario	2–1	Racing	Estadio Nacional, Lima
20:00 PET (UTC-05:00)	Gutiérrez 8'; Roca 64'		Lara 80'	Referee: Renzo Castañeda

== See also ==
- 2016 Torneo Descentralizado
- 2016 Peruvian Segunda División
- 2016 in Peruvian football
