= 2017 Torneo Descentralizado =

Torneo Descentralizado
- Season: 2017
- Dates: 4 February – 3 December 2017
- Champions: Alianza Lima (23rd title)
- Relegated: Alianza Atlético; Juan Aurich
- Copa Libertadores: Alianza Lima; Real Garcilaso; Melgar; Universitario
- Copa Sudamericana: UTC; Sport Huancayo; Sport Rosario; Sporting Cristal
- Matches: 352
- Goals: 931 (2.64 per match)
- Top goalscorer: Irven Ávila (22 goals)
- Biggest home win: Real Garcilaso 7–0 Juan Aurich (May 14)
- Biggest away win: Alianza Atlético 0–5 Sporting Cristal (Feb. 12)
- Highest scoring: Alianza Lima 7–2 Juan Aurich (Mar. 12)
- Highest attendance: 28,600; Universitario 3–0 Alianza Lima (15 Apr. 2017)
- Lowest attendance: 161; Alianza Atlético 1–2 Union Comercio (13 May 2017)
- Total attendance: 1,246,988
- Average attendance: 3,542

The 2017 Torneo Descentralizado de Fútbol Profesional (known as the 2017 Copa Movistar for sponsorship reasons) was the 101st season of the highest division of Peruvian football. A total of 16 teams competed in the season. Alianza Lima were the champions.

== Competition modus ==
The season was divided into four phases, Torneo de Verano, Torneo Apertura, Torneo Clausura, and the Play-offs final.

The first phase was the Torneo de Verano where all the teams were divided into two groups and played each team in their group twice at home and away. The winner of each group qualified to a double-legged, home-and-away final. The group winner with the most points in the aggregate table chose which leg they played as the home team. The winner of this tournament earned access to the second round of the 2018 Copa Libertadores as long as it was not relegated at the end of the season. If the Torneo de Verano champion was to also win either the Apertura or Clausura tournaments then the runner-up would take their Copa Libertadores berth.

The second and third stages were two smaller Apertura and Clausura tournaments of 15 games each. Each team played all other teams once during the Apertura tournament and once during the Clausura tournament in reversed order for a total of 30 matches. Points earned during the Apertura did not carry over during the Clausura. The winners of the Apertura and Clausura stages were to qualify to the Playoff final and to the 2018 Copa Libertadores group stage as long as they were not relegated at the end of the season.

The playoffs were to be contested by the Apertura and Clausura champions. The team with the most points on the aggregate table would choose which leg they would play as the home team. If teams were tied in points, a third match on neutral ground would be played to decide the national champion. If a team won both the Apertura and Clausura tournaments, then it would be automatically declared the tournament champion and the runners-up from the Apertura and Clausura tournaments would play two play-off matches to decide which team would enter the 2018 Copa Libertadores group stage. The two teams with the fewest points at the end of the third stage were relegated. The berth to the Copa Libertadores first stage and the four 2018 Copa Sudamericana berths were awarded to the teams with the best record in the aggregate table that had not qualified for the Copa Libertadores.

== Teams ==
A total of 16 teams played in the 2017 Torneo Descentralizado. Fourteen teams from the previous season, plus the 2016 Segunda División champion (Academia Cantolao) and the 2016 Copa Perú champion (Sport Rosario).

=== Team changes ===
Promoted from 2016 Segunda División	Promoted from 2016 Copa Perú	Relegated from 2016 Primera División
▲ Academia Cantolao (1st)	▲ Sport Rosario (1st)	▼ Universidad César Vallejo (15th) ▼ Defensor La Bocana (16th)

=== Stadia and locations ===
Locations of the 2017 Primera División teams

Team	City	Stadium	Capacity
Academia Cantolao	Callao	Miguel Grau	15,000
Alianza Atlético	Sullana	Melanio Colona	5,000
Alianza Lima	Lima	Alejandro Villanueva	35,000
Ayacucho	Ayacucho	Ciudad de Cumaná	15,000
Comerciantes Unidos	Cutervo	Juan Maldonado Gamarra	8,000
Deportivo Municipal	Lima	Iván Elías Moreno	10,000
Juan Aurich	Chiclayo	Elías Aguirre	24,500
Melgar	Arequipa	Virgen de Chapi	60,000
Real Garcilaso	Cusco	Estadio Garcilaso	42,056
Sport Huancayo	Huancayo	Estadio Huancayo	20,000
Sport Rosario	Huaraz	Rosas Pampa	18,000
Sporting Cristal	Lima	Alberto Gallardo	18,000
Unión Comercio	Nueva Cajamarca	IPD de Moyobamba	7,500
Universidad San Martín	Callao	Miguel Grau	17,000
UTC	Cajamarca	Héroes de San Ramón	18,000
Universitario	Lima	Monumental	80,093

== Torneo de Verano ==
=== Group A ===
Pos	Team	Pld	W	D	L	GF	GA	GD	Pts	Qualification	MEL	SRO	CRI	CAN	USM	AYA	UCO	AAS
1	Melgar	14	7	6	1	20	12	+8	27	Advance to Finals		0–0	2–2	0–0	2–1	2–2	3–0	2–1
2	Sport Rosario	14	6	6	2	13	7	+6	24		0–0		2–1	1–1	1–1	1–0	0–0	1–0
3	Sporting Cristal	14	6	4	4	27	16	+11	22		2–0	1–0		1–4	3–0	4–0	0–0	4–1
4	Academia Cantolao	14	5	4	5	16	15	+1	19		1–1	0–0	2–0		0–2	1–3	2–0	0–1
5	Universidad San Martín	14	5	2	7	18	19	−1	17		1–2	3–1	1–0	1–2		2–0	3–0	0–1
6	Ayacucho	14	4	4	6	18	21	−3	16		1–3	0–1	2–2	2–1	3–0		1–1	1–2
7	Unión Comercio	14	4	4	6	16	20	−4	16		1–2	0–2	2–2	3–1	2–1	0–2		5–0
8	Alianza Atlético	14	3	2	9	10	28	−18	11		0–1	0–3	0–5	0–1	2–2	1–1	1–2	

Source: ADFP
Legend: Blue = home team win; Yellow = draw; Red = away team win.
Rules for classification: 1) points; 2) goal difference; 3) goals scored; 4) draw.

=== Group B ===
Pos	Team	Pld	W	D	L	GF	GA	GD	Pts	Qualification	UTC	RGA	ALI	UNI	SHU	COM	MUN	JA
1	UTC	14	8	3	3	24	15	+9	27	Advance to Finals		2–1	1–1	2–1	2–0	2–0	1–0	3–0
2	Real Garcilaso	14	7	3	4	27	17	+10	24		1–4		2–1	3–1	2–0	0–0	1–0	7–0
3	Alianza Lima	14	6	5	3	22	15	+7	23		0–0	2–0		2–0	2–2	0–0	2–2	7–2
4	Universitario	14	5	4	5	19	18	+1	19		3–1	1–1	3–0		1–1	3–0	1–0	2–2
5	Sport Huancayo	14	5	3	6	19	23	−4	18		2–1	1–0	1–2	2–1		4–2	2–0	3–2
6	Comerciantes Unidos	14	5	3	6	18	22	−4	18		4–2	2–4	0–2	3–0	2–1		3–2	0–1
7	Deportivo Municipal	14	4	2	8	13	16	−3	14		0–1	1–1	2–0	1–2	2–0	0–1		2–1
8	Juan Aurich	14	2	5	7	15	31	−16	11		2–2	3–1	0–1	0–0	1–1	1–1	0–1	

Source: ADFP
Legend: Blue = home team win; Yellow = draw; Red = away team win.
Rules for classification: 1) points; 2) goal difference; 3) goals scored; 4) draw.

=== Finals ===
The champion will be the one with the most points after the two legs are played. In case they are tie on points, the team with the best goal different over the two legs will be declared the champion. The away goal rule will not apply. In case both teams score the same number of goals, there will be 30 minutes of extra time and penalties.

May 21, 2017
16:00 PET
First Leg

Melgar	1–0	UTC
Omar Fernández 31'	report

Estadio Monumental de la UNSA, Arequipa
Attendance: 11,168
Referee: Miguel Santiváñez

May 31, 2017
14:30 PET
Second Leg

UTC	2–1	Melgar
Gustavo Dulanto 7'; Donald Millán 40'	report	Emanuel Herrera 90'
Penalties
Guerrero (penalty scored); Segura (penalty missed); Díaz (penalty scored); Dulanto (penalty scored); Millán (penalty missed)	3–4	(penalty missed) Fernández; (penalty scored) Barrientos; (penalty scored) Herrera; (penalty scored) Zuñiga; (penalty scored) Arce

Estadio Héroes de San Ramón, Cajamarca
Attendance: 10,242
Referee: Joel Alarcón

Melgar defeated UTC 4–3 on penalties after being tied on aggregate and secured a spot in the 2018 Copa Libertadores second stage.

== Torneo Apertura ==
=== Standings ===
Pos	Team	Pld	W	D	L	GF	GA	GD	Pts	Qualification
1	Alianza Lima	15	9	3	3	25	11	+14	30	Advance to Playoffs and qualification to Copa Libertadores group stage
2	Real Garcilaso	15	9	3	3	23	18	+5	30	
3	UTC	15	8	3	4	17	9	+8	27	
4	Sport Huancayo	15	7	5	3	23	16	+7	26	
5	Universitario	15	7	5	3	20	14	+6	26	
6	Deportivo Municipal	15	6	5	4	17	13	+4	23	
7	Sporting Cristal	15	6	5	4	22	20	+2	23	
8	Sport Rosario	15	5	6	4	16	18	−2	21	
9	Melgar	15	5	4	6	19	18	+1	19	
10	Universidad San Martín	15	5	4	6	25	26	−1	19	
11	Comerciantes Unidos	15	4	5	6	18	21	−3	17	
12	Unión Comercio	15	4	3	8	21	21	0	15	
13	Ayacucho	15	4	3	8	15	26	−11	15	
14	Alianza Atlético	15	3	3	9	13	22	−9	12	
15	Academia Cantolao	15	2	5	8	12	20	−8	11	
16	Juan Aurich	15	1	8	6	14	27	−13	11	

Source: ADFP
Rules for classification: 1) points; 2) goal difference; 3) goals scored; 4) draw.

=== Results ===
Home \ Away	AAS	ALI	AYA	CAN	COM	JA	MEL	MUN	RGA	SHU	SRO	CRI	UCO	USM	UTC	UNI
Alianza Atlético		1–0				1–1	1–0			1–3		2–3	1–3	0–2	0–0	
Alianza Lima			4–0	1–1		2–0			2–0	3–3	4–1			3–2		
Ayacucho	1–0			0–0	5–3	3–1	1–2		2–1	1–1	0–1					
Academia Cantolao	2–1				0–1		0–0	0–2	2–3			1–1	2–0		0–0	
Comerciantes Unidos	0–2	0–0						0–0				4–2	2–0	1–2	1–0	
Juan Aurich				1–0	2–2		2–2	1–1	1–2		1–1					1–1
Melgar		1–0			1–1			1–1				4–1	2–1	2–3	2–0	
Deportivo Municipal	3–1	0–2	2–0							2–1			1–0	1–0	0–1	
Real Garcilaso	2–1				2–1		1–0	2–1				1–0	2–1		2–1	
Sport Huancayo				2–0	3–1	3–0	2–0		1–1		2–0					1–0
Sport Rosario	1–0			3–1	1–1		2–1	1–0	1–1			1–3				0–0
Sporting Cristal		0–1	2–0			0–0		2–2		2–0				2–1	1–0	1–1
Unión Comercio		0–1	3–1			2–2				4–0	1–1	2–2		3–1		1–2
Universidad San Martín			1–1	3–2		4–1			2–2	0–0	1–1					2–4
UTC		1–0	3–0			3–0				1–1	2–1		1–0	3–1		1–0
Universitario	1–1	1–2	2–0	2–1	1–0		2–1	1–1	2–1							

Source: ADFP - official fixture
Legend: Blue = home team win; Yellow = draw; Red = away team win.

== Torneo Clausura ==
=== Standings ===
Pos	Team	Pld	W	D	L	GF	GA	GD	Pts	Qualification
1	Alianza Lima	15	11	1	3	23	15	+8	34	Advance to Playoffs and qualification to Copa Libertadores group stage
2	Real Garcilaso	15	10	2	3	29	15	+14	32	
3	Melgar	15	9	4	2	30	12	+18	31	
4	Universitario (Note: Universitario was deducted 1 point for an outstanding debt.)	15	9	3	3	28	18	+10	29	
5	Deportivo Municipal	15	6	5	4	23	20	+3	23	
6	Sport Rosario	15	5	5	5	20	17	+3	20	
7	Sport Huancayo	15	5	5	5	22	22	0	20	
8	UTC	15	6	2	7	17	17	0	20	
9	Sporting Cristal	15	5	3	7	27	24	+3	18	
10	Juan Aurich	15	5	2	8	22	28	−6	17	
11	Academia Cantolao (Note: Cantolao was deducted 1 point for an outstanding debt.)	15	4	6	5	13	22	−9	17	
12	Comerciantes Unidos	15	4	3	8	22	24	−2	15	
13	Ayacucho	15	3	5	7	18	26	−8	14	
14	Universidad San Martín	15	4	2	9	20	29	−9	14	
15	Unión Comercio	15	3	4	8	15	22	−7	13	
16	Alianza Atlético	15	3	4	8	13	31	−18	13	

Source: ADFP
Rules for classification: 1) points; 2) goal difference; 3) goals scored; 4) draw.

=== Results ===
Home \ Away	AAS	ALI	AYA	CAN	COM	JA	MEL	MUN	RGA	SHU	SRO	CRI	UCO	USM	UTC	UNI
Alianza Atlético			0–2	0–0	3–2			1–1	3–2		1–4					0–2
Alianza Lima	3–0				2–0		2–1	1–0				2–1	1–0		2–0	1–0
Ayacucho		1–2						1–1				5–3	0–1	3–0	2–2	3–3
Academia Cantolao		1–1	0–0			3–2				1–1	1–1			3–1		1–0
Comerciantes Unidos			4–0	3–0		3–2	1–1		2–3	2–1	0–1					1–1
Juan Aurich	1–1	2–0	2–0							3–2		2–1	2–1	0–0	1–2	
Melgar	2–0		2–0	5–0		4–3			0–2	4–0	2–2					2–0
Deportivo Municipal				2–0	1–0	2–1	1–1		0–0		3–0	3–2				3–5
Real Garcilaso		4–1	2–0	1–0		5–1				0–1	2–1			2–1		1–2
Sport Huancayo	1–1	4–2	1–1					3–0				2–1	1–1	2–3	2–0	
Sport Rosario		0–1	3–0			2–0				1–1			0–0	1–1	2–1	
Sporting Cristal	4–0			3–0	2–2		1–2		0–0		2–1		2–0			
Unión Comercio	1–2			2–2	3–1		0–2	2–2	1–2						1–0	
Universidad San Martín	4–1	1–2			3–2		0–2	1–4				2–3	2–0		0–2	
UTC	2–0			0–1	2–0		0–0	2–0	2–3			1–0				
Universitario						2–0				2–0	2–1	2–2	3–2	2–1	3–1	

Source: ADFP - official fixture
Legend: Blue = home team win; Yellow = draw; Red = away team win.

== Playoffs ==
As Alianza Lima and Real Garcilaso finished both as champions and runners-up of the Apertura and Clausura tournaments, no playoff games were played. Alianza Lima were the overall champions and Real Garcilaso were the overall runners-up, and both teams qualified for the 2018 Copa Libertadores group stage.

== Aggregate table ==
All stages (Torneo de Verano, Torneo Apertura, and Torneo Clausura) of the 2017 season were aggregated into a single league table throughout the season to determine the teams that would qualify for the Copa Libertadores and Copa Sudamericana, as well as those to be relegated at the end of the season.

Pos	Team	Pld	W	D	L	GF	GA	GD	Pts	Qualification
1	Alianza Lima (C)	44	26	9	9	70	41	+29	87	Qualification to Copa Libertadores group stage
2	Real Garcilaso	44	26	8	10	79	50	+29	86	Qualification to Copa Libertadores group stage
3	Melgar	44	21	14	9	69	42	+27	77	Qualification to Copa Libertadores second stage
4	Universitario (Note: Universitario was deducted 1 point for an outstanding debt.)	44	21	12	11	68	51	+17	74	Qualification to Copa Libertadores first stage
5	UTC	44	22	8	14	58	41	+17	74	Qualification to Copa Sudamericana first stage
6	Sport Huancayo (Note: Sport Huancayo was awarded 2 points for winning the 2017 Torneo de Promoción y Reserva.)	44	17	13	14	64	61	+3	66	Qualification to Copa Sudamericana first stage
7	Sport Rosario	44	16	17	11	49	42	+7	65	Qualification to Copa Sudamericana first stage
8	Sporting Cristal (Note: Sporting Cristal was awarded 1 point for finishing as Torneo de Promoción y Reserva runners-up.)	44	17	12	15	76	60	+16	64	Qualification to Copa Sudamericana first stage
9	Deportivo Municipal	44	16	12	16	53	49	+4	60	
10	Comerciantes Unidos	44	13	11	20	59	68	−9	50	
11	Universidad San Martín	44	14	8	22	63	74	−11	50	
12	Academia Cantolao (Note: Academia Cantolao was deducted 1 point for an outstanding debt.)	44	11	15	18	41	57	−16	47	
13	Ayacucho	44	11	12	21	51	73	−22	45	
14	Unión Comercio	44	11	11	22	52	63	−11	44	
15	Juan Aurich (Note: Juan Aurich was deducted 1 point for an outstanding debt with Ray Gómez.) (R)	44	8	15	21	52	87	−35	38	Relegation to 2018 Segunda División
16	Alianza Atlético (Note: Alianza Atlético was deducted 3 points for not giving youth players enough minutes during the tournament.) (R)	44	9	9	26	37	82	−45	33	Relegation to 2018 Segunda División

Source: ADFP
Rules for classification: 1) points; 2) goal difference; 3) goals scored; 4) draw.
(C) Champions; (R) Relegated

== See also ==
- 2017 Torneo de Promoción y Reserva
- 2017 Peruvian Segunda División
- 2017 Copa Perú
- 2017 in Peruvian football
