= Gino Guerrero =

Peruvian footballer (born 1992)

Personal information
- Full name: Gino Guerrero Lara
- Date of birth: 24 October 1992 (age 34)
- Place of birth: Lima, Peru
- Height: 1.73 m (5 ft 8 in)
- Position: Winger

Team information
- Current team: UTC
- Number: 10

Youth career
- Alianza Lima

Senior career*
Years	Team	Apps	(Gls)
2011–2013	Alianza Lima	19	(0)
2013	Paços Ferreira	0	(0)
2013–2014	Juan Aurich	5	(0)
2015	Cienciano	3	(0)
2015	León de Huánuco	3	(1)
2016	Sport Coopsol	4	(0)
2017	UTC	41	(8)
2018	Guaraní	2	(0)
2018–2019	Melgar	14	(1)
2019	Real Garcilaso	4	(0)
2020–	UTC	0	(0)
- * Club domestic league appearances and goals as of 23:02, 1 April 2020 (UTC)

Gino Guerrero Lara (born 24 October 1992) is a Peruvian footballer who plays as a winger for Universidad Técnica de Cajamarca in the Peruvian Primera División.

== Career ==
In 2011, Gino Guerrero got his first chance to play for the Alianza Lima first team in the Torneo Intermedio cup, where he replaced Carlos Jairzinho Gonzales but could not help his side getting eliminated on penalties away to José Gálvez FBC. The following season, he made his Torneo Descentralizado league debut in the 1–1 draw at home against Inti Gas for round 38. He featured for Alianza in 13 league matches that season.

== Career statistics ==
As of 19 October 2020

Club	Division	Season	League		National cup		Continental		Total	
Club	Division	Season	Apps	Goals	Apps	Goals	Apps	Goals	Apps	Goals
Alianza Lima	1.ª	2011	0	0	1	0	-	-	1	0
Alianza Lima	1.ª	2012	13	0	-	-	-	-	13	0
Alianza Lima	1.ª	2013	6	0	-	-	-	-	6	0
Alianza Lima	Total		19	0	1	0	0	0	20	0
Paços Ferreira	1.ª	2013-14	0	0	0	0	-	-	0	0
Juan Aurich	1.ª	2014	5	0	4	0	-	-	9	0
Cienciano	1.ª	2015	3	0	6	1	-	-	9	1
León de Huánuco	1.ª	2015	3	1	-	-	-	-	3	1
Sport Coopsol	2.ª	2016	4	0	-	-	-	-	4	0
UTC	1.ª	2017	40	8	1	0	-	-	41	8
Guaraní	1.ª	2018	2	0	-	-	-	-	2	0
Melgar	1.ª	2018	9	1	-	-	-	-	9	1
Melgar	1.ª	2019	5	0	-	-	3	0	8	0
Melgar	Total		14	1	0	0	3	0	17	1
Real Garcilaso	1.ª	2019	4	0	2	0	-	-	6	0
UTC	1.ª	2020	4	0	-	-	-	-	4	0
UTC	Total		44	8	1	0	0	0	45	8
Career total			98	10	14	0	3	0	115	10
