= Peruvian Clásico =

Football derby in Peru

El Clásico Peruano
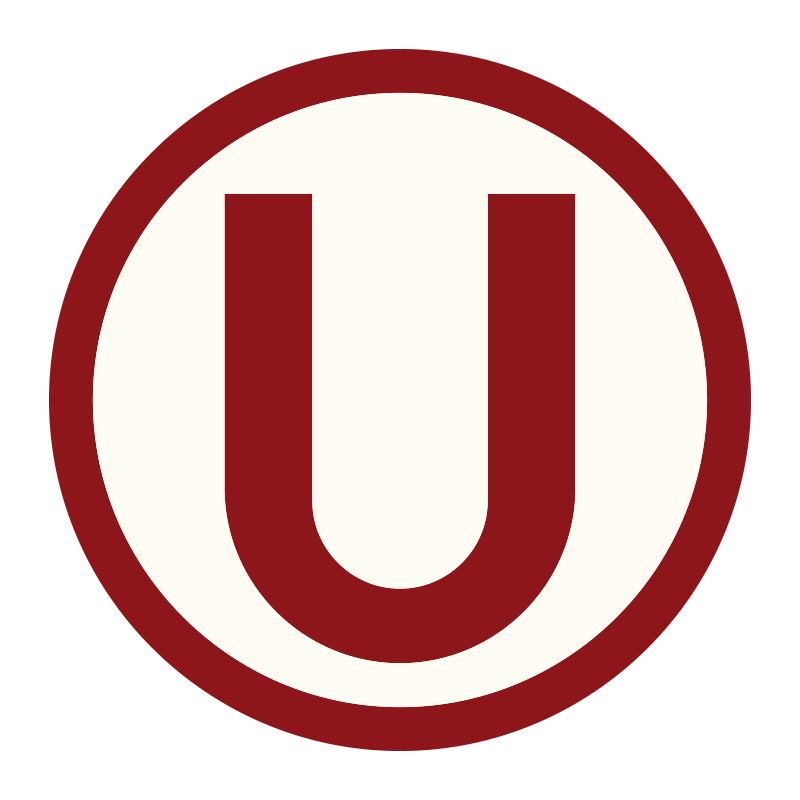
- Alianza Lima Universitario
- Location: Lima
- Teams: Alianza Lima; Universitario
- First meeting: Universitario 1–0 Alianza Lima (23 September 1928)
- Latest meeting: Alianza Lima 1–2 Universitario (12 September 2026)
- Stadiums: Alejandro Villanueva (Alianza Lima); Monumental (Universitario)

Statistics
- Total meetings: 375
- Most wins: Alianza Lima (142)
- Most player appearances: José Luis Carranza (61 games)
- Top scorer: Teodoro Fernández (29 goals)
- All-time series: Alianza Lima: 142; Draw: 107; Universitario: 127
- Largest victory: Alianza Lima 9–1 Universitario (12 Jun 1949); Universitario 6–2 Alianza Lima (14 April 1946)

The Peruvian Clásico (El Clásico Peruano) or the Classic of the Classics of Peruvian Football (El Clásico de los Clásicos del Futbol Peruano) is the name given to Peru's biggest football derby between Alianza Lima and Universitario. The rivalry between these two clubs started in their first game on 23 September 1928 when the two first faced off in a violent game. Both clubs come from the capital city, Lima.

The rivalry has given rise to an intense conflict between the working class and upper class of Lima, as the city went through a series of changes in the late-1920s, including public works and better education. Alianza Lima—coming from a more working-class neighborhood—has had many black players in its team throughout the years, whereas Universitario, which was founded by a group of university students, produced many white players. Therefore, in some occasions, the duel between the two teams is also labeled as negros contra blancos.

Out of the 376 matches played, Alianza has come out victorious 142 times, more than Universitario's 127.

== History ==
The first Clásico took place on 23 September 1928 between Federación Universitaria and Alianza Lima. Alianza Lima was the favorite of the game because they had already been champions of the League and also Federación Universitaria was a fairly new club, founded only four years ago and it being their first year in the first division. However, Federacion Universitaria won the game with an early penalty goal during the first-half at the seventh minute by Pablo Pacheco. By the eighty-first minute, Alianza Lima had lost 5 players to red cards and the game was suspended by the Uruguayan referee Julio Borelli. The violence was also seen in the stands between the fans of Federacion Universitaria and Alianza's players. Fans threw canes at the players and because of this, years later this match was nicknamed El Clásico de los Bastonazos.

== Finals, semi-finals and title deciders ==
Alianza Lima and Universitario have met in several league finals and title-deciding matches. Despite Alianza Lima having an advantage over Universitario in games won, Universitario has claimed the most title-deciding matches. These include:

- Alianza Lima 2–0 Federación Universitaria (1 November 1928) – This was only the third time the two teams had faced off. Both teams tied for first place in the final group stage in which Federación Universitaria–later to become Universitario de Deportes–had won the violent clásico played in the group stage. Their tie for first place led forced an extra match to determine the champion. The game was a 1–1 draw which led to a replay of the match. Alianza Lima won the replay 2–0 to become 1928 champion.
- Alianza Lima 4–1 Universitario (15 May 1947) – The Torneo Apertura was a preseason tournament played by the top four teams of the previous season. Alianza Lima and Universitario were tied for first which forced an extra match to determine the 1947 Torneo Apertura winner. The clásico already played was a 1–0 win for Universitario. However, Alianza Lima won this decisive match by 4 goals to 1 which was also Alianza Lima's first win against Universitario in a Torneo Apertura.
- Alianza Lima 2–1 Universitario (27 May 1956) – Alianza Lima and Universitario had tied for first place in the league standings which led to a playoff match. By this time, football in Peru had achieved professional status. The match, played in 1956, was being played for the 1955 season title. Alianza Lima won with goals from Valeriano López and Máximo Mosquera over Segundo Guevara's goal for Universitario for their eleventh First Division title.
- Alianza Lima 0–0 (7–8 p) Universitario (8 August 1985) – The first semi-final match between Alianza Lima and Universitario was played at Alianza Lima's Estadio Alejandro Villanueva for the Torneo Regional of the 1985 season. The match was a scoreless draw which led to the first and only penalty shootout ever contested between the two. In the shootout, both teams' keepers, one being the Argentine Ramón Quiroga, were drawn into a verbal fight. The match's atmosphere was intensified by the keepers' feud on the field during the shootout. Universitario would go on to win the shootout and advance to the Regional final.
- Universitario 1–0 Alianza Lima (26 March 1988) – The first season final between the derby rivals played for the 1987 season played at the Estadio Nacional. Universitario had won the Torneo Regional while Alianza Lima advanced to the final through the all-play-all Descentralizado Liguilla. Both teams reached the final with 17 First Division titles under their belt. During the course of the season, Alianza Lima had won 2 derbies while Universitario had only won one in addition to two draws. In the final, Fidel Suárez scored the only goal of the game to give Universitario their eighteenth First Division title.
- Copa Plácido Galindo – Universitario and Alianza Lima played in a two-legged semi-final for this one-off football tournament in 1989.
  - Alianza Lima 0–2 Universitario (16 September 1989) – In the first leg of the semi-final, Universitario earned an away victory at Alianza Lima's Estadio Alejandro Villanueva with goals from Fidel Suárez and Jesus Torrealba.
  - Universitario 0–1 Alianza Lima (19 September 1989) – In the second leg of the semi-final, Alianza Lima won by a single goal scored by Juan Saavedra at the Estadio Nacional. However, on aggregate Universitario had a one-goal lead which advanced them to the final.
- Universitario 1–0 Alianza Lima (30 January 1991) – For the fifth time in history, Universitario and Alianza Lima had finished a tournament round sharing first place in the Liguilla phase of the 1990 Torneo Regional II. An extra match was arranged at the Estadio Nacional. Roberto Martínez scored Universitario's lone goal for a trip to the season final against Torneo Regional I winner Sport Boys.
- Universitario 1–0 Alianza Lima (27 December 1995) – For the 1995 season, Universitario and Alianza Lima tied yet again in the standings but this time for second place in the Liguilla phase. An extra match was played to determine the season runner-up which would qualify to the Copa Libertadores with Descentralizado champion Sporting Cristal. Prior to this match, of the four derbies played, 3 were victories for Alianza Lima while the remaining game was a scoreless draw. In spite of the record favoring Alianza Lima, Universitario won with a late Roberto Martínez goal in the second half sending to the 1996 Copa Libertadores.
- 1999 Torneo Descentralizado Finals – Universitario and Alianza Lima had won the Torneo Apertura and Torneo Clausura respectively both advancing to the finals of the 1999 season.
  - Universitario 3–0 Alianza Lima (15 December 1999) – The first leg of the final was played in the Estadio Nacional. In the first half, Roberto Farfán stole a misguided header by an Alianza Lima defender and lobbed it over Cristian del Mar for Universitario's first goal. In the second half, Eduardo Esidio received a bad free kick taken by Alianza Lima close to their own penalty box in which Esidio only had to kick to score the second goal of the match. Near the end of the second half, Universitario had a free kick just outside Alianza's penalty box which José del Solar took in order to score Universitario's third goal and seal the victory.
  - Alianza Lima 1–0 Universitario (20 December 1999) – The second leg was played at the Estadio Alejandro Villanueva. Alianza Lima needed to score at least 3 goals to tie on aggregate. Víctor Mafla scored a late first half goal for Alianza however they failed to reach Universitario on aggregate earning them their 23rd title and this moment is called "The First MatUtazo" by the "Trinchera U Norte".
- 2002 Torneo Apertura – Universitario and Alianza Lima tied for first in the Torneo Apertura leading to a tie-breaking match for title.
  - Universitario 1–0 Alianza Lima (26 June 2002) – The first clásico played at Universitario's Estadio Monumental "U". A Martín Villalonga header in the early second half gave Universitario's only goal of the match. Violence surrounded the match by fans which led to the suspension of Alianza Lima's stadium for the second leg.
  - Alianza Lima 0–0 Universitario (7 July 2002) – The second leg was moved to Trujillo and played at the Estadio Mansiche. The scoreless draw gave Universitario the title and sent them to the 2003 Copa Libertadores. The Torneo Apertura also guaranteed Universitario a spot in the 2002 final if they managed to place above 5th place in the Torneo Clausura.
- 2009 Torneo Descentralizado Finals – The latest final Universitario and Alianza Lima have played. In the final, goal difference was not used as a tie-breaking criterion. If the finalists were tied on points after the second leg, a third match at a neutral venue would've been necessary to determine the champion. Universitario reached the final with a winning streak having won both derbies played in the course of the season and the last derby of the 2008 season.
  - Alianza Lima 0–1 Universitario (8 December 2009) – The first leg was played at the Estadio Alejandro Villanueva. A first half goal by Piero Alva put Universitario in the lead. For much of the second half, Alianza Lima consistently attacked but thanks to a great match by goalkeeper Raúl Fernández, Universitario managed to finish the game with a clean sheet.
  - Universitario 1–0 Alianza Lima (13 December 2009) – The second leg was contested at Universitario's Estadio Monumental "U" which had hosted few clásicos since 2002 due to security issues. Nolberto Solano scored a 10th-minute penalty which led to Universitario's victory ending an eight-season title drought and their 25th First Division title as well as a 5-game winning streak against Alianza Lima.
- 2023 Liga 1 Finals – In November 2023, the two teams faced off in the play-off final of the Liga 1: on November 8, in the second leg, Universitario gained a 2–0 victory over Alianza Lima away at the Alejandro Villanueva Stadium, thus claiming the twenty-seventh league title in their history, as well as the first one in ten years. Footage from the post-match celebrations made the headlines, as the Matute Stadium's lights were suddenly turned off just seconds after the final whistle, a gesture that was widely interpreted as an attempt to prevent Universitario from celebrating; the final ceremony was ultimately cancelled, as Universitario players eventually celebrated the win by taking an Olympic lap around the stadium, using their smartphones as torches. In an official press statement, the Universitario board condemned the post-match events as "shameful" and asked the national sporting authorities to sanction their rival club; Alianza denied the accusations, claiming that the decision to turn off the stadium's lights was taken in order to "protect the integrity and the safety of fans and sporting delegations" and this incident is called by the barras bravas "El Apagón" (The Blackout in english) or "The Second MatUtazo" claimed by the barras bravas from the "Trinchera U Norte"

== Statistics ==
=== Trophies ===
National competitions		Universitario	Alianza Lima
Amateur football	Escudo Dewar (1912–1921)	—	2^{[B]}
Amateur football	Liga Provincial de Lima (1927–1950)	6^{[A]}	7
Professional football	Liga Provincial de Lima (1951–1965)	3	6
Professional football	Torneo Descentralizado (1966–2018)	16	9
Professional football	Liga 1 (2019–2025)	3	2
Total		29	25

=== Games ===
As of 12 September 2026

	Alianza wins	Draws	U wins	Alianza goals	U goals
Primera División	103	78	93	352	333
Copa Libertadores	2	3	7	10	19
Copa Sudamericana	2	0	0	2	0
Campeonato de Apertura	4	1	8	26	24
Total	111	82	108	489	456
Friendly	31	25	19	99	80
Total	142	107	127	489	456

=== Records ===
- Record victory – Alianza Lima 9–1 Universitario (12 June 1949)
- Record Primera División victory – Alianza Lima 6–1 Universitario (30 December 1977)
- Record Copa Libertadores victory – Universitario 6–3 Alianza Lima (24 February 1979)
- Most goals scored – 29, Teodoro Fernández
- Most appearances overall – 61, José Luis Carranza
- First player to score in a Primera Division match - Mario Catalá
- Most goals scored in a match – 6, Eduardo Fernández (14 April 1946)

== Results ==
=== Primera División ===
==== Campeonato de Selección y Competencia (1928–1950) ====
Season	Date	Winner	Score^{[C]}	Venue	Competition round^{[D]}
1928	23 September 1928	Universitario	1–0	Stadium Nacional	Torneo Amateur Lima Liguilla
1928	21 October 1928	Draw	1–1	Stadium Nacional	Torneo Amateur Lima play-off
1928	1 November 1928	Alianza Lima	2–0	Stadium Nacional	Torneo Amateur Lima play-off replay
1930	30 November 1930	Draw	1–1	Stadium Nacional	Torneo Amateur Lima Liguilla
1931	21 June 1931	Alianza Lima	walkover	Stadium Nacional	Torneo Amateur Lima
1932	2 October 1932	Alianza Lima	1–0	Stadium Nacional	Torneo Amateur Lima
1933	27 August 1933	Draw	2–2	Stadium Nacional	Torneo Amateur Lima
1934	18 November 1934	Alianza Lima	2–1	Stadium Nacional	Torneo Amateur Lima
1934	7 July 1935	Universitario	2–1	Stadium Nacional	Torneo Amateur Lima 1934 play-off
1935	27 October 1935	Alianza Lima	walkover	Stadium Nacional	Torneo Amateur Lima
1937	12 September 1937	Universitario	2–1	Stadium Nacional	Torneo Amateur Lima
1938	23 October 1938	Universitario	2–1	Stadium Nacional	Torneo Amateur Lima
1940	12 May 1940	Draw	0–0	Stadium Nacional	Torneo Amateur Lima
1940	24 September 1940	Universitario	2–0	Stadium Nacional	Torneo Amateur Lima
1941	28 September 1941	Draw	0–0	Stadium Nacional	Torneo Amateur Lima
1941	12 April 1942	Universitario	3–1	Stadium Nacional	Torneo Amateur Lima
1942	21 November 1942	Draw	4–4	Stadium Nacional	Torneo Amateur Lima
1943	1 November 1943	Alianza Lima	5–0	Stadium Nacional	Torneo Amateur Lima
1943	14 November 1943	Universitario	1–0	Stadium Nacional	Torneo Amateur Lima
1944	16 July 1944	Universitario	3–1	Stadium Nacional	Torneo Amateur Lima
1944	3 September 1944	Universitario	1–0	Stadium Nacional	Torneo Amateur Lima
1945	16 September 1945	Universitario	2–1	Stadium Nacional	Torneo Amateur Lima
1945	25 November 1945	Universitario	3–1	Stadium Nacional	Torneo Amateur Lima
1946	7 July 1946	Alianza Lima	3–0	Stadium Nacional	Torneo Amateur Lima
1946	25 August 1946	Alianza Lima	2–1	Stadium Nacional	Torneo Amateur Lima
1946	12 October 1946	Draw	0–0	Stadium Nacional	Torneo Amateur Lima
1947	29 June 1947	Alianza Lima	4–3	Stadium Nacional	Torneo Amateur Lima
1947	30 August 1947	Alianza Lima	4–0	Stadium Nacional	Torneo Amateur Lima
1947	26 October 1947	Universitario	2–1	Stadium Nacional	Torneo Amateur Lima
1948	12 June 1948	Universitario	3–2	Stadium Nacional	Torneo Amateur Lima
1948	12 September 1948	Alianza Lima	1–0	Stadium Nacional	Torneo Amateur Lima
1948	21 November 1948	Alianza Lima	5–2	Stadium Nacional	Torneo Amateur Lima
	12 June 1949	Alianza Lima	9-1	Stadium Nacional	Torneo Apertura
1949	3 July 1949	Alianza Lima	5–0	Stadium Nacional	Torneo Amateur Lima
1949	4 September 1949	Universitario	2–1	Stadium Nacional	Torneo Amateur Lima
1949	13 November 1949	Universitario	3–1	Stadium Nacional	Torneo Amateur Lima
1950	17 September 1950	Alianza Lima	3–1	Stadium Nacional	Torneo Amateur Lima
1950	26 November 1950	Alianza Lima	2–1	Stadium Nacional	Torneo Amateur Lima

==== Campeonato Profesional de Lima (1951–1965) ====
Season	Date	Winner	Score^{[C]}	Venue	Competition round
1951	2 September 1951	Alianza Lima	4–3	Stadium Nacional	Liga Prof. de Lima
1951	11 November 1951	Universitario	2–0	Stadium Nacional	Liga Prof. de Lima
1952	14 September 1952	Universitario	2–1	Stadium Nacional	Liga Prof. de Lima
1952	30 November 1952	Alianza Lima	2–3	Estadio Nacional	Liga Prof. de Lima
1953	30 August 1953	Universitario	4–2	Estadio Nacional	Liga Prof. de Lima
1953	15 November 1953	Universitario	3–2	Estadio Nacional	Liga Prof. de Lima
1954	3 October 1954	Draw	3–3	Estadio Nacional	Liga Prof. de Lima
1954	3 January 1955	Alianza Lima	3–2	Estadio Nacional	Liga Prof. de Lima
1955	14 August 1955	Draw	1–1	Estadio Nacional	Liga Prof. de Lima
1955	6 November 1955	Alianza Lima	3–1	Estadio Nacional	Liga Prof. de Lima
1955	27 May 1956	Alianza Lima	1–2	Estadio Nacional	Liga Prof. de Lima play-off
1956	9 September 1956	Draw	3–3	Estadio Nacional	Liga Prof. de Lima
1956	10 November 1956	Alianza Lima	3–2	Estadio Nacional	Liga Prof. de Lima
1957	24 August 1957	Draw	1–1	Estadio Nacional	Liga Prof. de Lima
1957	27 October 1957	Draw	3–3	Estadio Nacional	Liga Prof. de Lima
1957	15 December 1957	Draw	0–0	Estadio Nacional	Liga Prof. de Lima Liguilla
1958	3 August 1958	Draw	1–1	Estadio Nacional	Liga Prof. de Lima
1958	5 October 1958	Draw	0–0	Estadio Nacional	Liga Prof. de Lima
1959	6 September 1959	Universitario	3–2	Estadio Nacional	Liga Prof. de Lima
1959	15 November 1959	Universitario	4–0	Estadio Nacional	Liga Prof. de Lima
1960	9 October 1960	Alianza Lima	1–0	Estadio Nacional	Liga Prof. de Lima
1960	4 December 1960	Universitario	2–1	Estadio Nacional	Liga Prof. de Lima
1961	15 October 1961	Draw	1–1	Estadio Nacional	Liga Prof. de Lima
1961	1 January 1962	Draw	1–1	Estadio Nacional	Liga Prof. de Lima
1962	28 October 1962	Alianza Lima	4–2	Estadio Nacional	Liga Prof. de Lima
1962	23 December 1962	Alianza Lima	5–0	Estadio Nacional	Liga Prof. de Lima
1963	2 September 1963	Alianza Lima	3–1	Estadio Nacional	Liga Prof. de Lima
1963	17 November 1963	Universitario	2–1	Estadio Nacional	Liga Prof. de Lima
1964	13 September 1964	Universitario	1–0	Estadio Nacional	Liga Prof. de Lima
1964	15 November 1964	Universitario	3–0	Estadio Nacional	Liga Prof. de Lima
1964	3 January 1965	Universitario	2–1	Estadio Nacional	Liga Prof. de Lima Liguilla
1965	19 September 1965	Draw	2–2	Estadio Nacional	Liga Prof. de Lima
1965	21 November 1965	Alianza Lima	1–0	Estadio Nacional	Liga Prof. de Lima
1965	19 December 1965	Universitario	1–0	Estadio Nacional	Liga Prof. de Lima Liguilla

==== Torneo Descentralizado (1966–2018) ====
Season	Date	Score	Winner	Venue	Competition round
1966	5 November 1966	3–2	Alianza Lima	Estadio Nacional	Descentralizado
1966	12 February 1967	2–0	Universitario	Estadio Nacional	Descentralizado
1967	10 September 1967	3–2	Universitario	Estadio Nacional	Descentralizado
1967	17 December 1967	3–1	Alianza Lima	Estadio Nacional	Descentralizado
1968	23 June 1968	2–0	Alianza Lima	Estadio Nacional	Descentralizado
1968	26 October 1968	1–3	Alianza Lima	Estadio Nacional	Descentralizado
1969	28 September 1969	2–2	Draw	Estadio Nacional	Descentralizado
1969	17 December 1969	2–2	Draw	Estadio Nacional	Liguilla
1970	28 June 1970	4–2	Universitario	Estadio Nacional	Descentralizado
1970	13 September 1970	2–2	Draw	Estadio Nacional	Descentralizado
1971	8 August 1971	2–1	Alianza Lima	Estadio Nacional	Descentralizado
1971	12 December 1971	1–1	Draw	Estadio Nacional	Descentralizado
1972	1 April 1972	1–2	Universitario	Estadio Nacional	Metropolitano
1972	20 May 1972	1–2	Alianza Lima	Estadio Nacional	Metropolitano
1972	3 September 1972	2–2	Draw	Estadio Nacional	Descentralizado
1972	26 November 1972	2–2	Draw	Estadio Nacional	Descentralizado
1972	31 December 1972	1–3	Universitario	Estadio Nacional	Liguilla
1973	10 June 1973	3–2	Universitario	Estadio Nacional	Decentralizado
1973	14 October 1973	2–1	Alianza Lima	Estadio Nacional]	Decentralizado
1973	5 January 1974	2–1	Alianza Lima	Estadio Nacional	Liguilla
1974	15 July 1974	2–0	Universitario	Estadio Nacional	Descentralizado
1974	22 December 1974	0–3	Universitario	Estadio Nacional	Descentralizado
1974	2 March 1975	3–1	Alianza Lima	Estadio Alejandro Villanueva	Descentralizado
1975	9 October 1975	2–1	Alianza Lima	Estadio Alejandro Villanueva	Decentralizado
1975	15 January 1976	0–1	Alianza Lima	Estadio Nacional	Decentralizado
1975	22 February 1976	0–0	Draw	Estadio Nacional	Liguilla
1976	18 July 1976	1–1	Draw	Estadio Alejandro Villanueva	Decentralizado
1976	31 October 1976	1–0	Universitario	Estadio Nacional	Decentralizado
1977	13 March 1977	1–0	Universitario	Estadio Nacional	Regional Metropolitano
1977	8 May 1977	2–1	Alianza Lima	Estadio Alejandro Villanueva	Regional Metropolitano
1977	24 July 1977	2–2	Draw	Estadio Alejandro Villanueva	Decentralizado
1977	27 October 1977	2–2	Draw	Estadio Nacional	Decentralizado
1977	30 December 1977	6–1	Alianza Lima	Estadio Alejandro Villanueva	Liguilla
1977	22 January 1978	3–4	Alianza Lima	Estadio Nacional	Liguilla
1978	26 August 1978	1–2	Alianza Lima	Estadio Nacional	Decentralizado
1978	3 December 1978	2–1	Alianza Lima	Estadio Alejandro Villanueva	Decentralizado
1979	27 May 1979	0–1	Alianza Lima	Estadio Nacional	Decentralizado
1979	9 September 1979	1–0	Alianza Lima	Estadio Alejandro Villanueva	Decentralizado
1979	2 December 1979	1–1	Draw	Estadio Alejandro Villanueva	Liguilla
1979	12 January 1980	1–1	Draw	Estadio Nacional	Liguilla
1980	6 July 1980	2–2	Draw	Estadio Alejandro Villanueva	Decentralizado
1980	25 October 1980	1–1	Draw	Estadio Nacional	Decentralizado
1981	23 March 1981	0–1	Alianza Lima	Estadio Nacional	Regional Metropolitano
1981	26 April 1981	3–1	Alianza Lima	Estadio Alejandro Villanueva	Regional Metropolitano
1981	11 July 1981	1–2	Alianza Lima	Estadio Nacional	Decentralizado
1981	21 November 1981	2–1	Alianza Lima	Estadio Alejandro Villanueva	Decentralizado
1982	1 August 1982	1–1	Draw	Estadio Alejandro Villanueva	Regional Metropolitano
1982	29 August 1982	0–1	Alianza Lima	Estadio Nacional	Regional Metropolitano
1982	26 September 1982	2–1	Alianza Lima	Estadio Alejandro Villanueva	Regional Metropolitano
1982	22 October 1982	2–2	Draw	Estadio Nacional	Regional Metropolitano
1982	4 December 1982	1–1	Draw	Estadio Nacional	Semifinals Group B
1982	30 January 1983	2–0	Alianza Lima	Estadio Alejandro Villanueva	Semifinals Group B
1982	9 February 1983	2–1	Universitario	Estadio Nacional	Liguilla
1983	29 June 1983	2–1	Universitario	Estadio Nacional	Decentralizado
1983	1 November 1983	1–2	Universitario	Estadio Alejandro Villanueva	Decentralizado
1984	15 April 1984	0–1	Universitario	Estadio Alejandro Villanueva	Regional Metropolitano
1984	10 June 1984	1–1	Draw	Estadio Nacional	Regional Metropolitano
1984	26 August 1984	2–0	Universitario	Estadio Nacional	Decentralizado
1984	11 November 1984	1–1	Draw	Estadio Alejandro Villanueva	Decentralizado
1985	3 March 1985	1–0	Alianza Lima	Estadio Alejandro Villanueva	Regional Metropolitano
1985	11 May 1985	3–0	Universitario	Estadio Nacional	Regional Metropolitano
1985	8 August 1985	0–0 (7–8 p)^{[E]}	Draw	Estadio Alejandro Villanueva	Regional semifinals
1985	8 September 1985	2–0	Alianza Lima	Estadio Alejandro Villanueva	Decentralizado
1985	22 December 1985	1–0	Universitario	Estadio Nacional	Decentralizado
1985	26 March 1986	3–2	Universitario	Estadio Nacional	Liguilla
1986	3 August 1986	4–0	Alianza Lima	Estadio Alejandro Villanueva	Regional Metropolitano
1986	8 October 1986	0–0	Draw	Estadio Nacional	Regional Metropolitano
1986	21 November 1986	1–2	Alianza Lima	Estadio Nacional	Decentralizado
1986	28 December 1986	5–1	Alianza Lima	Estadio Alejandro Villanueva	Decentralizado
1987	3 May 1987	0–0	Draw	Estadio Nacional	Regional Metropolitano
1987	9 August 1987	1–2	Universitario	Estadio Alejandro Villanueva	Regional Metropolitano
1987	1 November 1987	0–1	Alianza Lima	Estadio Nacional	Decentralizado
1987	31 January 1988	0–0	Draw	Estadio Alejandro Villanueva	Decentralizado
1987	9 March 1988	1–0	Alianza Lima	Estadio Nacional	Liguilla
1987	26 March 1988	1–0	Universitario	Estadio Nacional	Final
1988	12 June 1988	0–1	Alianza Lima	Estadio Nacional	Regional Metropolitano
1988	27 July 1988	0–1	Universitario	Estadio Alejandro Villanueva	Regional Metropolitano
1988	11 January 1989	2–2	Draw	Estadio Nacional	Liguilla
1989	1 April 1989	1–1	Draw	Estadio Nacional	Regional I Metropolitano
1989	6 August 1989	1–0	Alianza Lima	Estadio Alejandro Villanueva	Copa Placido Galindo
1989	16 September 1989	0–2	Universitario	Estadio Alejandro Villanueva	Copa Placido Galindo; Semifinals
1989	19 September 1989	0–1	Alianza Lima	Estadio Nacional	Copa Placido Galindo; Semifinals
1989	26 November 1989	0–1	Universitario	Estadio Alejandro Villanueva	Regional II Metropolitano
1990	27 May 1990	1–1	Draw	Estadio Alejandro Villanueva	Regional I Metropolitano
1990	8 October 1990	2–1	Universitario	Estadio Nacional	Regional II Metropolitano
1990	2 December 1990	0–1	Alianza Lima	Estadio Nacional	Regional II Metropolitano
1990	23 January 1991	1–0	Alianza Lima	Estadio Nacional	Regional II Liguilla
1990	30 January 1991	1–0	Universitario	Estadio Nacional	Regional II play-off
1991	28 April 1991	0–0	Draw	Estadio Alejandro Villanueva	Regional I Metropolitano
1991	22 September 1991	1–0	Universitario	Estadio Nacional	Regional II Metropolitano
1991	31 October 1991	0–0	Draw	Estadio Nacional	Regional II Metropolitano
1992	17 May 1992	1–0	Universitario	Estadio Nacional	Decentralizado
1992	12 September 1992	0–2	Universitario	Estadio Alejandro Villanueva	Decentralizado
1993	3 April 1993	0–0	Draw	Estadio Nacional	Decentralizado
1993	10 October 1993	0–1	Universitario	Estadio Alejandro Villanueva	Decentralizado
1994	21 May 1994	1–0	Alianza Lima	Estadio Alejandro Villanueva	Decentralizado
1994	8 October 1994	1–1	Draw	Estadio Nacional	Decentralizado
1994	14 December 1994	2–1	Alianza Lima	Estadio Nacional	Liguilla
1995	20 May 1995	6–3	Alianza Lima	Estadio Alejandro Villanueva	Decentralizado
1995	1 October 1995	0–1	Alianza Lima	Estadio Nacional	Decentralizado
1995	29 October 1995	0–0	Draw	Estadio Alejandro Villanueva	Liguilla
1995	3 December 1995	0–1	Alianza Lima	Estadio Nacional	Liguilla
1995	27 December 1995	1–0	Universitario	Estadio Nacional	Descentralizado Runner-up play-off
1996	29 June 1996	1–1	Draw	Estadio Nacional	Descentralizado
1996	19 October 1996	0–0	Draw	Estadio Alejandro Villanueva	Descentralizado
1996	1 December 1996	0–0	Draw	Estadio Nacional	Liguilla
1997	6 April 1997	0–1	Alianza Lima	Estadio Nacional	Torneo Apertura
1997	4 October 1997	0–0	Draw	Estadio Alejandro Villanueva	Torneo Clausura
1998	29 March 1998	0–0	Draw	Estadio Alejandro Villanueva	Torneo Apertura
1998	31 May 1998	2–1	Universitario	Estadio Nacional	Torneo Apertura
1998	6 September 1998	1–0	Alianza Lima	Estadio Alejandro Villanueva	Torneo Clausura
1998	21 November 1998	0–3	Alianza Lima	Estadio Nacional	Torneo Clausura
1999	28 March 1999	2–1	Universitario	Estadio Nacional	Torneo Apertura
1999	29 May 1999	0–1	Universitario	Estadio Alejandro Villanueva	Torneo Apertura
1999	11 September 1999	0–0	Draw	Estadio Alejandro Villanueva	Torneo Clausura
1999	21 November 1999	2–3	Alianza Lima	Estadio Nacional	Torneo Clausura
1999	15 December 1999	3–0	Universitario	Estadio Nacional	Descentralizado Finals
1999	20 December 1999	1–0	Alianza Lima	Estadio Alejandro Villanueva	Descentralizado Finals
2000	5 March 2000	0–2	Universitario	Estadio Alejandro Villanueva	Torneo Apertura
2000	20 May 2000	2–0	Universitario	Estadio Nacional	Torneo Apertura
2000	19 August 2000	0–1	Universitario	Estadio Alejandro Villanueva	Torneo Clausura
2000	1 November 2000	4–1	Universitario	Estadio Nacional	Torneo Clausura
2001	29 March 2001	2–2	Draw	Estadio Nacional	Torneo Apertura
2001	27 May 2001	1–0	Alianza Lima	Estadio Alejandro Villanueva	Torneo Apertura
2001	30 August 2001	2–1	Universitario	Estadio Nacional	Torneo Clausura
2001	11 November 2001	1–1	Draw	Estadio Alejandro Villanueva	Torneo Clausura
2002	19 March 2002	0–1	Alianza Lima	Estadio Nacional	Torneo Apertura
2002	19 May 2002	1–0	Alianza Lima	Estadio Alejandro Villanueva	Torneo Apertura
2002	26 June 2002	1–0	Universitario	Estadio Monumental	Torneo Apertura play-off
2002	7 July 2002	0–0	Draw	Estadio Nacional	Torneo Apertura play-off
2002	4 August 2002	1–2	Alianza Lima	Estadio Nacional	Torneo Clausura
2002	30 October 2002	3–2	Alianza Lima	Estadio Alejandro Villanueva	Torneo Clausura
2003	9 March 2003	1–0	Alianza Lima	Estadio Alejandro Villanueva	Torneo Apertura
2003	18 May 2003	2–4	Alianza Lima	Estadio Nacional	Torneo Apertura
2003	10 August 2003	1–1	Draw	Estadio Alejandro Villanueva	Torneo Clausura
2003	26 October 2003	1–2	Alianza Lima	Estadio Nacional	Torneo Clausura
2004	2 May 2004	0–1	Alianza Lima	Estadio Nacional	Torneo Apertura
2004	14 August 2004	1–0	Alianza Lima	Estadio Alejandro Villanueva	Torneo Apertura
2004	31 October 2004	0–0	Draw	Estadio Nacional	Torneo Clausura
2004	22 December 2004	0–2	Universitario	Estadio Alejandro Villanueva	Torneo Clausura
2005	20 March 2005	2–2	Draw	Estadio Nacional	Torneo Apertura
2005	25 June 2005	0–0	Draw	Estadio Alejandro Villanueva	Torneo Apertura
2005	18 September 2005	0–0	Draw	Estadio Alejandro Villanueva	Torneo Clausura
2005	27 November 2005	2–1	Universitario	Estadio Nacional	Torneo Clausura
2006	25 March 2006	1–1	Draw	Estadio Alejandro Villanueva	Torneo Apertura
2006	11 June 2006	1–1	Draw	Estadio Nacional	Torneo Apertura
2006	20 August 2006	1–0	Alianza Lima	Estadio Alejandro Villanueva	Torneo Clausura
2006	5 November 2006	3–2	Universitario	Estadio Nacional	Torneo Clausura
2007	3 March 2007	1–2	Alianza Lima	Estadio Nacional	Torneo Apertura
2007	6 May 2007	1–2	Universitario	Estadio Alejandro Villanueva	Torneo Apertura
2007	7 November 2007	1–3	Alianza Lima	Estadio Manuel R. Sanchez	Torneo Clausura
2007	25 November 2007	1–1	Draw	Estadio Alejandro Villanueva	Torneo Clausura
2008	30 April 2008	2–1	Universitario	Estadio Nacional	Torneo Apertura
2008	6 July 2008	1–1	Draw	Estadio Alejandro Villanueva	Torneo Apertura
2008	14 September 2008	1–2	Alianza Lima	Estadio Monumental	Torneo Clausura
2008	29 November 2008	1–2	Universitario	Estadio Alejandro Villanueva	Torneo Clausura
2009	22 March 2009	0–1	Universitario	Estadio Alejandro Villanueva	Torneo Descentralizado
2009	12 July 2009	2–1	Universitario	Estadio Monumental	Torneo Descentralizado
2009	8 December 2009	0–1	Alianza Lima	Estadio Alejandro Villanueva	Torneo Descentralizado Finals
2009	13 December 2009	0–5	Alianza Lima	Estadio Monumental	Torneo Descentralizado Finals
2010	3 April 2010	0–0	Draw	Estadio Alejandro Villanueva	Torneo Descentralizado
2010	10 July 2010	0–1	Alianza Lima	Estadio Monumental	Torneo Descentralizado
2010	25 September 2010	0–0	Draw	Estadio Monumental	Liguilla Group A
2010	10 November 2010	2–2	Draw	Estadio Alejandro Villanueva	Liguilla Group A
2011	16 April 2011	0–0	Draw	Estadio Alejandro Villanueva	Torneo Descentralizado
2011	24 September 2011	2–1	Universitario	Estadio Monumental	Torneo Descentralizado
2012	15 April 2012	1–0	Alianza Lima	Estadio Nacional	Torneo Descentralizado
2012	14 July 2012	2–1	Universitario	Estadio Nacional	Torneo Descentralizado
2013	14 April 2013	1–0	Alianza Lima	Estadio Nacional	Torneo Descentralizado
2013	15 July 2013	1–0	Universitario	Estadio Monumental	Torneo Descentralizado
2014	19 July 2014	1–0	Universitario	Estadio Nacional	Torneo Descentralizado
2014	22 October 2014	1–0	Alianza Lima	Estadio Nacional	Torneo Descentralizado
2015	24 May 2015	1–0	Alianza Lima	Estadio Alejandro Villanueva	Torneo Descentralizado
2015	15 November 2015	1–1	Draw	Estadio Nacional	Torneo Descentralizado
2016	13 April 2016	1–2	Universitario	Estadio Alejandro Villanueva	Torneo Descentralizado
2016	21 Julio 2016	1–0	Universitario	Estadio Nacional	Torneo Descentralizado
2016	17 September 2016	3–0^{[G]}	Alianza Lima	Estadio Nacional	Liguilla Group B
2017	12 February 2017	2–0	Alianza Lima	Estadio Alejandro Villanueva	Torneo de Verano Group B
2017	15 April 2017	3–0	Universitario	Estadio Monumental	Torneo de Verano Group B
2017	3 June 2017	2–1	Alianza Lima	Estadio Monumental	Torneo Descentralizado
2017	9 September 2017	1–0	Alianza Lima	Estadio Alejandro Villanueva	Torneo Descentralizado
2018	25 February 2018	3–1	Alianza Lima	Estadio Monumental	Torneo de Verano Group A
2018	11 April 2018	2–0	Alianza Lima	Estadio Alejandro Villanueva	Torneo de Verano Group A
2018	11 August 2018	1–1	Draw	Estadio Monumental	Torneo Descentralizado
2018	3 November 2018	2–1	Alianza Lima	Estadio Alejandro Villanueva	Torneo Descentralizado

==== Liga 1 (2019–present) ====
Season	Date	Score	Winner	Venue	Competition round
2019	15 April 2019	2–3	Universitario	Estadio Alejandro Villanueva	Liga 1
2019	29 September 2019	1–0	Universitario	Estadio Monumental	Liga 1
2020	8 March 2020	2–0	Universitario	Estadio Monumental	Liga 1
2021	18 August 2021	1–2	Alianza Lima	Estadio Nacional	Liga 1
2022	17 April 2022	1–4	Alianza Lima	Estadio Monumental	Liga 1
2022	4 September 2022	0–2	Universitario	Estadio Alejandro Villanueva	Liga 1
2023	19 February 2023	1–2	Alianza Lima	Estadio Monumental	Liga 1
2023	22 July 2023	0–0	Draw	Estadio Alejandro Villanueva	Liga 1
2023	4 November 2023	1–1	Draw	Estadio Monumental	Liga 1 Finals
2023	8 November 2023	0–2	Universitario	Estadio Alejandro Villanueva	Liga 1 Finals
2024	10 February 2024	0–1	Universitario	Estadio Nacional	Liga 1
2024	26 July 2024	2–1	Universitario	Estadio Monumental	Liga 1
2025	5 April 2025	1–1	Draw	Estadio Alejandro Villanueva	Liga 1
2025	24 August 2025	0–0	Draw	Estadio Monumental	Liga 1
2026	4 April 2026	1–0	Universitario	Estadio Monumental	Liga 1
2026	12 September 2026	1–2	Universitario	Estadio Alejandro Villanueva	Liga 1

=== International ===
Season	Date	Home team	Score	Away team	Venue	Competition round
1966	5 January 1966	Universitario	2–0	Alianza Lima	Estadio Nacional	Copa Libertadores Group 1
1966	23 March 1966	Alianza Lima	0–1^{[F]}	Universitario	Estadio Nacional	Copa Libertadores Group 1
1972	25 February 1972	Universitario	2–1	Alianza Lima	Estadio Nacional	Copa Libertadores Group 4
1972	14 March 1972	Alianza Lima	2–2	Universitario	Estadio Nacional	Copa Libertadores Group 4
1979	24 February 1979	Alianza Lima	3–6	Universitario	Estadio Alejandro Villanueva	Copa Libertadores Group 3
1979	21 March 1979	Universitario	1–0	Alianza Lima	Estadio Nacional	Copa Libertadores Group 3
1983	12 March 1983	Universitario	0–0	Alianza Lima	Estadio Nacional	Copa Libertadores Group 3
1983	13 April 1983	Alianza Lima	2–1	Universitario	Estadio Alejandro Villanueva	Copa Libertadores Group 3
1988	1 July 1988	Universitario	0–0	Alianza Lima	Estadio Nacional	Copa Libertadores Group 4
1988	3 March 1988	Alianza Lima	0–2	Universitario	Estadio Nacional	Copa Libertadores Group 4
1994	2 February 1994	Universitario	0–1	Alianza Lima	Estadio Nacional	Copa Libertadores Group 3
1994	23 March 1994	Alianza Lima	1–2	Universitario	Estadio Alejandro Villanueva	Copa Libertadores Group 3
2002	4 September 2002	Universitario	0–1	Alianza Lima	Estadio Nacional	Copa Sudamericana Preliminary round
2002	11 September 2002	Alianza Lima	1–0	Universitario	Estadio Nacional	Copa Sudamericana Preliminary round

=== Torneo Apertura ===
Date	Winner	Score	Venue
25 May 1941	Universitario	3–1	Stadium Nacional
22 April 1945	Universitario	3–0	Stadium Nacional
14 April 1946	Universitario	6–2	Stadium Nacional
4 May 1947	Universitario	1–0	Stadium Nacional
15 May 1947	Alianza Lima	4–1	Stadium Nacional
12 June 1949	Alianza Lima	9–1	Stadium Nacional
18 June 1950	Universitario	1–0	Stadium Nacional
29 May 1955	Draw	1–1	Estadio Nacional
24 June 1956	Alianza Lima	4–1	Estadio Nacional
21 July 1957	Universitario	2–1	Estadio Nacional
29 June 1958	Universitario	3–1	Estadio Nacional
14 July 1963	Alianza Lima	1–0	Estadio Nacional
23 April 1969	Universitario	2–1	Estadio Nacional

=== Filler tournament ===
During the 1969 season, Universitario and Alianza Lima faced off in a filler tournament. The tournament did not award points towards the Descentralizado of the season.

Season	Date	Winner	Score	Venue
1969	25 May 1969	Universitario	3–0	Estadio Nacional

=== Friendlies ===
Date	Score	Winner	Venue	Tournament/Occasion
24 April 1930	2–0	Alianza Lima	Stadium Nacional	
7 June 1931	1–1	Draw	Stadium Nacional	
8 November 1931	2–0	Alianza Lima	Stadium Nacional	
17 July 1932	3–2	Alianza Lima	Stadium Nacional	Torneo Representación
27 February 1932	1–0	Universitario	Stadium Nacional	
5 June 1932	1–1	Draw	Stadium Nacional	
28 July 1933	1–0	Alianza Lima	Stadium Nacional	
29 April 1934	3–2	Universitario	Stadium Nacional	
13 May 1934	2–0	Alianza Lima	Stadium Nacional	
15 August 1934	0–0	Draw	Stadium Nacional	
21 July 1935	2–1	Alianza Lima	Stadium Nacional	
15 November 1936	2–1	Universitario	Stadium Nacional	
17 January 1937	2–0	Universitario	Stadium Nacional	
18 April 1937	2–1	Universitario	Stadium Nacional	
2 January 1938	2–1	Universitario	Stadium Nacional	
12 June 1938	1–0	Alianza Lima	Stadium Nacional	
22 August 1943	3–3	Draw	Stadium Nacional	
16 April 1944	2–1	Universitario	Stadium Nacional	
28 May 1944	2–2	Draw	Stadium Nacional	
26 May 1945	2–1	Universitario	Stadium Nacional	
2 November 1947	0–0	Draw	Stadium Nacional	
16 July 1950	1–0	Universitario	Stadium Nacional	Gran Torneo Relámpago
8 April 1951	0–0	Draw	Stadium Nacional	
10 June 1951	1–0	Universitario	Stadium Nacional	
30 August 1951	2–2	Draw	Stadium Nacional	
20 January 1952	4–0	Alianza Lima	Estadio Universidad San Marcos	
9 March 1952	2–2	Draw	Estadio José P. Peratta	
28 May 1952	6–1	Universitario	Cancha de Circolo Sportivo Italiano	
13 July 1952	1–1	Draw	Estadio Lolo Fernández	In honor of national team
30 July 1952	4–3	Universitario	Estadio Mansiche	Cuadrangular
13 January 1954	0–0	Draw	Estadio Nacional	
26 October 1954	2–1	Alianza Lima	Estadio Nacional	
12 June 1955	2–2	Draw	Estadio Nacional	
28 July 1955	3–2	Universitario	Estadio Elías Aguirre	Triangular
25 May 1957	2–1	Alianza Lima	Estadio Nacional	
16 March 1958	3–1	Alianza Lima	Estadio Nacional	
8 June 1958	1–1	Draw	Estadio Miguel Grau	Stadium's inauguration
28 January 1959	2–0	Alianza Lima	Estadio Nacional	
13 February 1962	3–2	Alianza Lima	Estadio Nacional	
2 September 1962	2–1	Alianza Lima	Estadio Nacional	
5 May 1963	2–1	Alianza Lima	Estadio Nacional	
18 April 1965	1–0	Alianza Lima	Estadio Nacional	Cuadrangular
6 January 1968	1–1	Draw	Estadio Nacional	Pentagonal
7 September 1969	1–1	Draw	Estadio Lolo Fernández	
24 June 1973	2–1	Alianza Lima	Estadio IV Centenario	Stadium's inauguration
3 August 1974	3–1	Universitario	Estadio Nacional	
25 December 1974	3–1	Alianza Lima	Estadio Municipal de Tarapoto	
8 July 1975	2–1	Alianza Lima	Estadio Elías Aguirre	Debut of floodlighting
16 April 1978	1–1	Draw	Estadio Nacional	
29 November 1980	2–1	Alianza Lima	Estadio Huancayo	Cuadrangular
15 February 1981	3–0	Alianza Lima	Lima	
19 June 1987	1–0	Alianza Lima	Iquitos	
28 July 1989	0–0	Draw	Estadio Mariano Melgar	Cuadrangular
14 December 1989	1–1	Draw	Estadio Félix C. Tardío	
21 March 1990	0–0	Draw	Estadio Alejandro Villanueva	Cuadrangular Ciudad de Lima
29 June 1990	3–1	Universitario	Estadio Nacional	I Copa Clásica
22 March 1992	0–2	Universitario	Estadio Alejandro Villanueva	II Copa Clásica
2 July 1997	2–1	Universitario	Miami Orange Bowl	
7 February 1998	1–0	Alianza Lima	Estadio Mariano Melgar	
5 July 1998	1–1	Draw	Estadio Elías Aguirre	
31 January 1999	2–0	Alianza Lima	Estadio Nacional	Copa El Gráfico Perú
29 July 2003	1–0	Universitario	Estadio Huancayo	
14 November 2004	2–1	Alianza Lima	Estadio Mansiche	
6 February 2005	2–0	Alianza Lima	Estadio Nacional	Copa Cusqueña
8 July 2006	1–1	Draw	Estadio Max Augustín	
28 January 2007	0–0	Draw	Lockhart Stadium	
3 February 2010	1–0	Alianza Lima	Estadio UNSA	
15 July 2011	0–0	Draw	Estadio Monumental	Copa Depor
14 October 2012	2–0	Alianza Lima	Estadio Nacional	Copa Magli Perú
1 December 2012	2–0	Alianza Lima	Lockhart Stadium	Inka Cup
7 December 2012	0–0	Draw	Estadio Nacional	Inka Cup
5 February 2014	0–1	Alianza Lima	Estadio Nacional	
1 June 2014	2–1	Alianza Lima	Estadio Nacional	
13 June 2015	2–2	Draw	Estadio Mansiche	
12 December 2015	1–0	Universitario	Estadio Aliardo Soria	
25 June 2016	1–0	Alianza Lima	Estadio Manuel Rivera Sánchez	

== Footnotes ==
A. Includes titles as "Federación Universitaria" (until 1932).
B. Includes titles as "Sport Alianza" (Liga).
C. Between 1928 and 1965, there was no designated home team.
D. A year indicates game was played in the early months of the following year due to lack of time.
E. Universitario won 8–7 in a penalty shootout to determine the winning semifinalist.
F. The original score was a 1–1 draw but Alianza Lima fielded two suspended players. The match was awarded 1–0 to Universitario.
G. The original score was a 1–1 draw but Universitario fielded one suspended players. The match was awarded 3–0 to Alianza Lima.
