= Hualgayoc District =

Coordinates: 6.7649°S 78.6065°W

Hualgayoc Wallqayuq
- District
- Location of Hualgayoc in the Hualgayoc Province
- Country: Peru
- Region: Cajamarca
- Province: Hualgayoc
- Capital: Hualgayoc

Area
  - Total: 226.17 km^{2} (87.32 sq mi)
- Elevation: 3,502 m (11,490 ft)

Population (2005 census)
  - Total: 15,803
  - Density: 69.872/km^{2} (180.97/sq mi)
- Time zone: UTC-5 (PET)
- UBIGEO: 060703

Hualgayoc District is one of three districts of the province Hualgayoc in Peru.
