= Sport Rosario =

Association football club in Peru

- Full name: Club Sport Rosario
- Nickname: El Canalla de Los Andes
- Founded: 4 October 1965
- Dissolved: 2019
- Ground: Estadio Rosas Pampa, Huaraz
- Capacity: 18,000
- Chairman: (Peru) Eliseo Mautino Ángeles
- Manager: (Argentina) Fernando Nogara
- League: Peruvian Segunda División
- 2018: Torneo Descentralizado, 15th (Relegated)
Home colours	Away colours

Club Sport Rosario was a Peruvian football club, based in the city of Huaraz. Sport Rosario was founded on October 4, 1965. The team played its home games at Rosas Pampa stadium.

== History ==
=== Foundation and Notorious Copa Perú Campaigns ===
Sport Rosario was founded on October 4, 1965 in Nicrupampa, which is part of the Independencia District of the city of Huaraz, Ancash by the Mautino Ángeles family. The club's name makes reference to Our Lady of the Rosary who is the patroness saint of Nicrupampa. In 1995 it adopted the colors of the Argentine club Rosario Central.

The club played at the local level for many years. Its first well known campaign happened in the 2002 Copa Perú where it reached the departamental stage where it lost the final against the Chimbote side José Gálvez. In 2004 it would once again reach the departamental stage where they would lose in the semi-finals against that year's eventual champions Sport Ancash. In 2007, Sport Rosario reached the Regional Stage as departamental runner-up where it was seeded in Group B against Unión Tarapoto, Deportivo Davy and Carlos A. Mannucci. Unfortunately the club finished last in its group with two victories and four losses.

=== Rise to the First Division ===
The club would not reach the final stages of the Copa Perú until 2014 where it would reach the National Stage for the first time in its history as the regional runner-up with financial help of Gelacio Mautino. They were eliminated in the round of 16 by Defensor La Bocana. Because of their great campaign and financial stability they were invited to participate in the Peruvian Segunda División for 2015. The Peruvian Football Federation did not allow Sport Rosario to participate in the tournament. Because of that the club did not participate in any competition in 2015 and presented a case against the Peruvian Football Federation at the Court of Arbitration for Sport.

In 2016 Sport Rosario started its campaign from the Liga distrital de Huaraz. It won its group with 12 points as well as the final group stage to become the district champion. It also won the Provincial Stage and Departamental Stage in Ancash. In April, the club president and primary financial supporter Gelacio Mautino, died in a car accident. The team reached the first stage of the National Stage of the 2016 Copa Perú where it finished 6th of 50 teams by defeating different teams from around Peru.

Sport Rosario defeated Deportivo Venus by a global score of 8-3 in the round of 16. It would also defeat Kola San Martín in the quarter-finals by a global score of 5-3 to reach the final group stage or Finalísima at the Estadio Nacional in Lima. In the Finalísima Sport Rosario tied against Deportivo Hualgayoc 1-1, defeated Escuela Municipal Binacional 3-2 and Racing de Huamanchuco 2-1 to finish the group with 7 points and therefore winning a place in the 2017 Torneo Descentralizado.

=== Torneo Descentralizado Debut ===
The Mautino Family reinforced the team for its debut in the highest flight of Peruvian soccer by hiring Argentine coach Gerardo Ameli. Other mediatic signs were Uruguayian forward Pablo Lavandeira, who missed the 2017 Copa Libertadores by moving from Deportivo Municipal, and goalkeeper Salomón Libman, Peruvian international with 6 caps who was part of the 2011 and 2015 Copa America third place squads.

Sport Rosario finished second in group A during Torneo de Verano behind FBC Melgar with 24 points. The highlight of the tournament was that the team went undefeated at home including a victory against the previous year champion Sporting Cristal. Ameli left the club to sign as coach of Deportivo Municipal and took Pablo Lavandeira with him after the Torneo Apertura. Sport Rosario suffered to balance the team after Lavandeira's leave. Even though it was not able to fight for either the Apertura or Clausura championship it finished 7th in the over-all table with 65 points and thus gain a slot in the 2018 Copa Sudamericana.

After their relegation in 2019, the club did not play in the 2019 Copa Perú before being dissolved; a new club, named Rosario Fútbol Club, inherited Sport Rosario's history, but also never played professionally.

== Honours ==
=== National ===
- Copa Perú:

Winners (1): 2016

=== Regional ===
- Liga Departamental de Ancash:

Winners (2): 2014, 2016
Runner-up (2): 2002, 2007

- Liga Provincial de Huaraz:

Winners (5): 2002, 2007, 2012, 2014, 2016
Runner-up (2): 2013, 2022

- Liga Distrital de Huaraz:

Winners (5): 2002, 2012, 2014, 2016, 2022
Runner-up (1): 2013

== See also ==
- List of football clubs in Peru
- Peruvian football league system
