= 2013 Sporting Cristal season =

Sporting Cristal
2013 season
- President: Felipe Cantuarias
- Coach: Claudio Vivas
- Stadium: Alberto Gallardo, Lima
- Torneo Descentralizado: First Stage: Third (3°); Second Stage: Second (2°) (Liguilla A); Aggregate Table: Third (3°); Third National (3°)
Home colours	Away colours	Third colours

The 2013 Sporting Cristal season were the Fifty-Eighth (58.º) of the club from its foundation in 1955, Fifty-Eight (58) participations consecutives in the top-flight of Peruvian Primera División (of 97 Editions) with denomination Torneo Descentralizado. In Previous Season the club qualified as Champions National 1st Place of the 2012 Torneo Descentralizado.

Sporting Cristal were a of sixteen (16) clubs in the Forty-Eighth edition (48.º) Torneo Descentralizado, the competition most important of the Peruvian football. The club played the Peruvian Primera División and Copa Libertadores for Twenty-Nineth (29th) Time.

== Club ==
=== Coaching staff ===
Position	Staff
Head coach	Roberto Mosquera
Assistant coach	Eduardo Noriega
Fitness trainer	Sebastián Salvatore
Goalkeepers coach	Humberto Camino
Technical assistant	Duilio Cisneros
Match delegate	Maximiliano Frías
Doctors	Julio Ramírez
Physiotherapists	Antonio Rodas, Hugo Araujo
Equipment managers	Miguel Linares, Denys Refulio, Rodoldo Zavala

Source: clubsportingcristal.pe

=== Grounds ===
Ground (capacity and dimensions)	Estadio Alberto Gallardo (18,000 / 105x68m)

== Players ==
=== Squad information ===
As of 18 January 2013

Note: Flags indicate national team as defined under FIFA eligibility rules; some limited exceptions apply. Players may hold more than one non-FIFA nationality.

No.	Pos.	Nation	Player
1	GK	PER	Diego Penny
6	DF	PER	Marcos Delgado
7	MF	ARG	Horacio Calcaterra
8	DF	PER	Nelinho Quina
9	FW	PER	Hernán Rengifo
10	MF	PER	Renzo Sheput
11	FW	PER	Irven Ávila
12	GK	PER	Luis Araujo
13	DF	PER	Renzo Revoredo
15	DF	ARG	Nicolás Ayr
16	DF	PER	Marcio Valverde
17	FW	PER	Joazinho Arroé
18	DF	PER	Jesús Álvarez
19	DF	PER	Eduardo Uribe
20	MF	PER	Deyair Reyes
21	DF	PER	Martín Carpio

No.	Pos.	Nation	Player
22	FW	PER	William Chiroque
23	MF	URU	Jorge Cazulo
24	FW	PER	Junior Ross
25	GK	PER	Luis Ortiz
27	MF	PER	Carlos Lobatón (Captain)
28	MF	PER	Édison Chávez
29	FW	URU	Jonathan Ramírez
--	GK	PER	Andy Vidal
--	DF	PER	Marcos Ortiz
--	MF	PER	Anthony Luy
--	MF	PER	Carlo Urquiaga
--	MF	PER	Irwin Acuña
--	MF	PER	Claudio Torrejón
--	FW	PER	Víctor Eugenio
--	FW	PER	Chritian Adrianzén

== Transfers ==
=== In ===
As of 9 February 2013

#	Pos.	Player	Transferred from	Type	Fee	Source
7	MW	(Argentina) Horacio Calcaterra	(Peru) Universitario	Transfer	Free	libero.pe
8	DW	(Peru) Nelinho Quina	(Peru) Juan Aurich	Transfer	Free	depor.pe
19	DW	(Peru) Eduardo Uribe	(Peru) Real Garcilaso	Transfer	Free	depor.pe
22	FW	(Peru) William Chiroque	(Peru) Juan Aurich	Transfer	Free	elcomercio.pe
1	GK	(Peru) Diego Penny	(Peru) Juan Aurich	Transfer	Free	elcomercio.pe
29	FW	(Uruguay) Jonathan Ramírez	(Uruguay) Nacional	Transfer	Free	depor.pe
17	FW	(Peru) Joazinho Arroé	(Portugal) Braga B	Transfer	Free	depor.pe

=== Out ===
As of 9 February 2013

#	Pos.	Player	Transferred To	Type	Fee	Source
8	MF	(Peru) Juan Carlos Mariño	(Mexico) Querétaro	Transfer	Free	peru21.pe
19	DF	(Peru) Giancarlo Carmona	(Argentina) San Lorenzo de Almagro	Transfer	Free	libero.pe
1	GK	(Peru) Erick Delgado	(Peru) Juan Aurich	Transfer	Free	goal.com
17	MF	(Peru) Luis Advíncula	(Ukraine) Tavriya Simferopol	Transfer	$300,000	peru.com
26	MF	(Peru) Tarek Carranza	(Peru) Juan Aurich	Transfer	Free	copaperu.net
18	FW	(Peru) José Shoro	(Peru) Juan Aurich	Transfer	Free	elpopular.pe
5	MF	(Peru) Oscar Vílchez	(Peru) Juan Aurich	Transfer	Free	peru.com
14	DF	(Peru) Yoshimar Yotún	(Brazil) Vasco da Gama	Loan	Free	peru.com

== Pre-season and friendlies ==
Win Draw Loss

23 January 2013 Copa Antel	Peñarol (Uruguay)	0 – 0 (4 – 5 p)	(Peru) Sporting Cristal	Colonia del Sacramento, Uruguay
20:30 (UTC-03)		Report		Stadium: Estadio Suppici
	Penalties
	Olivera (penalty scored); Torres (penalty scored); Estoyanoff (penalty scored); Grossmüller (penalty scored); Macaluso (penalty missed); López (penalty missed)		(penalty scored) Lobatón; (penalty scored) Ávila; (penalty missed) Ayr; (penalty scored) Delgado; (penalty scored) Valverde; (penalty scored) Calcaterra

27 January 2013 Copa Antel	Nacional (Uruguay)	0 – 2	(Peru) Sporting Cristal	Fray Bentos, Uruguay
18:30 (UTC-03)		Report	Rengifo 66', 78'	Stadium: Estadio Municipal Parque Liebig's

2 February 2013 Friendly	Sporting Cristal (Peru)	6 – 1	(Uruguay) Danubio	Lima, Peru
20:00 (UTC-05)	Rengifo 3', 69'; Ávila 6', 59'; Chiroque 36'; Sheput 48'	Report	Jiménez 44'	Stadium: Estadio Nacional

Last updated: 9 February 2013

== Competitions ==
=== Overview ===
Competition	Started round	Current position / round	Final position / round	First match	Last match
Torneo Descentralizado	—	—	4th	9 February 2013	November 2013
Copa Libertadores	Group stage	Group stage	Group stage	14 February 2013	18 April 2013

Updated to match played 9 February 2013
Source: Competitions

=== Torneo Descentralizado ===
==== Results summary ====
Overall								Home						Away					
Pld	W	D	L	GF	GA	GD	Pts	W	D	L	GF	GA	GD	W	D	L	GF	GA	GD
1	1	0	0	1	0	+1	3	1	0	0	1	0	+1	0	0	0	0	0	0

Last updated: 9 Feb 2013.
Source: Competitive matches

==== First stage ====
Win Draw Loss

9 February 2013 1	Sporting Cristal	1 – 0	U. San Martín	Lima
15:45 (UTC-05)	Lobatón 18'	Report	Durán (red card) 90+2'	Stadium: Estadio Alberto Gallardo; Referee: Manuel Garay

16 February 2013 2	Sport Huancayo	2 - 1	Sporting Cristal	Huancayo
(UTC-05)	Ibarra 34', 36'		Valverde 65'; Ramírez (red card) 28'	Stadium: Estadio Huancayo

23 February 2013 3	Sporting Cristal	5 - 0	Cienciano	Lima
(UTC-05)	Calcaterra 10', 26'; Sheput 41'; Ávila 61'; Cazulo 82'			Stadium: Estadio Alberto Gallardo

2 March 2013 4	Juan Aurich	3 - 0	Sporting Cristal	Chiclayo
(UTC-05)	Guevara 26'; Vílchez 67'; Pacheco 88'		Quina (red card) 87'	Stadium: Estadio Elías Aguirre

9 March 2013 5	Alianza Lima	2 - 2	Sporting Cristal	Lima
(UTC-05)	Aguirre 8'; Ibañez 21'; Cuba (red card) 76'		Arroé 2', 47'	Stadium: Estadio Nacional

16 March 2013 6	León de Huánuco	1 - 2	Sporting Cristal	Huánuco
(UTC-05)	Ascoy 49'		Sheput 15', 53' (pen.)	Stadium: Estadio Heraclio Tapia

30 March 2013 7	Sporting Cristal	5 - 0	Inti Gas	Lima
(UTC-05)	Ávila 23'; Sheput 45'; Ross 52'; Rengifo 55', 90+1'; Quina (red card) 89'			Stadium: Estadio Alberto Gallardo

6 April 2013 8	UTC Cajamarca	0 - 2	Sporting Cristal	Cajamarca
(UTC-05)			Revoredo 45'; Chiroque 53'	Stadium: Estadio Héroes de San Ramón

13 April 2013 9	Sporting Cristal	2 - 2	Pacífico	Lima
(UTC-05)	Rengifo 6'; Ávila 27'		Mendoza 14'; Obregón 88'	Stadium: Estadio Alberto Gallardo

20 April 2013 10	Melgar	3 - 0	Sporting Cristal	Arequipa
(UTC-05)	Aubert 13' (pen.), 41'; Frontán 82'			Stadium: Estadio de la UNSA

23 April 2013 11	Sporting Cristal	2 - 1	Real Garcilaso	Lima
(UTC-05)				Stadium: Estadio Alberto Gallardo

27 April 2013 12	Sporting Cristal	4 - 0	Universitario	Lima
(UTC-05)	Ávila 51'; Lobatón 68'; Alloco 73' (o.g.); Rengifo 90'			Stadium: Estadio Nacional

30 April 2013 13	Unión Comercio	0 - 3	Sporting Cristal	Moyobamba
(UTC-05)			Sheput 75'; Ávila 86', 90+3'	Stadium: Estadio IPD de Moyobamba

4 May 2013 14	Sporting Cristal	4 - 0	José Gálvez	Lima
(UTC-05)	Rengifo 45+1'; Cazulo 57'; Revoredo 71'; Lobatón 79'			Stadium: Estadio Alberto Gallardo

11 May 2013 15	Universidad César Vallejo	1 - 0	Sporting Cristal	Trujillo
(UTC-05)	Quinteros 30'			Stadium: Estadio Mansiche

18 May 2013 16	U. San Martín	0 - 3	Sporting Cristal	Lima
(UTC-05)			Rengifo 48'; Molina 51' (o.g.); Chiroque 88'	Stadium: Estadio Nacional

25 May 2013 17	Sporting Cristal	2 - 2	Sport Huancayo	Lima
(UTC-05)	Sheput 5' (pen.), 31'		Salazar 30' (pen.); Kleyr 90'	Stadium: Estadio Alberto Gallardo

1 June 2013 18	Cienciano	2 - 0	Sporting Cristal	Cuzco
(UTC-05)				Stadium: Inca Garcilaso de la Vega

15 June 2013 19	Sporting Cristal	1 - 0	Juan Aurich	Lima
(UTC-05)				Stadium: Estadio Alberto Gallardo

18 June 2013 20	Alianza Lima	1 - 0	Sporting Cristal	Lima
(UTC-05)				Stadium: Matute

23 June 2013 21	Sporting Cristal	3 - 1	León de Huánuco	Lima
(UTC-05)				Stadium: Estadio Alberto Gallardo

30 June 2013 22	Inti Gas	0 - 0	Sporting Cristal	Ayacucho
(UTC-05)				Stadium: Estadio Ciudad de Cumaná

7 July 2013 23	Sporting Cristal	1 - 1	UTC Cajamarca	Lima
(UTC-05)				Stadium: Estadio Alberto Gallardo

10 July 2013 24	Pacífico	1 - 1	Sporting Cristal	Lima
(UTC-05)				Stadium: Estadio Iván Elías Moreno

14 July 2013 25	Sporting Cristal	0 - 0	Melgar	Lima
(UTC-05)		Report		Stadium: Estadio Alberto Gallardo; Attendance: 3,259

21 July 2013 26	Real Garcilaso	3 - 0	Sporting Cristal	Cuzco
(UTC-05)		Report		Stadium: Inca Garcilaso de la Vega

28 July 2013 27	Universitario	3 - 0	Sporting Cristal	Lima
(UTC-05)	D. Chávez 62'; R. Torres 74'; D. Guastavino 84'	Report		Stadium: Estadio Monumental; Attendance: 15,789; Referee: Henry Gambetta

4 August 2013 28	Sporting Cristal	2 - 0	Unión Comercio	Lima
(UTC-05)	I. Ávila 6'; J. Lencinas 63' (o.g.)	Report		Stadium: Estadio Alberto Gallardo

11 August 2013 29	José Gálvez	2 - 1	Sporting Cristal	Chimbote
(UTC-05)	J. Aliberti 20'; J. Vásquez 83'	Report	J. Fernández 17'	Stadium: Estadio Manuel Rivera Sanchez

18 August 2013 30	Sporting Cristal	4 - 2	Universidad César Vallejo	Lima
(UTC-05)	J. Fernández 14'; H. Calcaterra 36'; C. Lobatón 87' (pen.), 90' (pen.)	Report	G. Alemanno 29'; D. Chávez 32'	Stadium: Estadio Alberto Gallardo; Attendance: 4,700; Referee: Luis Garay

==== Second stage ====
Win Draw Loss

Last updated: 9 February 2013
Source: ClubSportingCristal.com, Soccerway.com

Sporting Cristal	1 – 0	Sport Huancayo	Lima
J. Ross 58'	Report		Stadium: Estadio Alberto Gallardo; Referee: Fredy Arellanos

Pacífico	0 - 1	Sporting Cristal	Huacho
	Report	J. Arroé 11'	Stadium: Est. S. Aranda; Referee: Diego Haro

Real Garcilaso	2 - 1	Sporting Cristal	Cusco
F. Ramos 25' (pen.); V. Ferreira 27'	Report	I. Ávila 49'	Stadium: Est. Urcos; Referee: Miguel Santivañez

Sporting Cristal	1 - 0	Alianza Lima	Lima
J. Álvarez 73'	Report		Stadium: Est. A. Gallardo; Referee: Víctor Hugo Carrillo

Sporting Cristal	0 - 1	Unión Comercio	Lima
	Report	V. Rossel 38'	Stadium: Est. A. Gallardo; Referee: Eduardo Chirinos

Sporting Cristal	2 - 0	Universidad César Vallejo	Lima
J. Fernández 56'; I. Ávila 65'	Report		Stadium: Est. A. Gallardo; Referee: Manuel Garay

FBC Melgar	0 - 0	Sporting Cristal	Arequipa
	Report	V. Rossel 38'	Stadium: Est. Melgar; Referee: Miguel Santivañez

Sport Huancayo	2 - 1	Sporting Cristal	Huancayo
S. Ibarra 62', 70'	Report	H. Cacaterra 84'	Stadium: Est. Huancayo; Attendance: 5,420; Referee: Luis Seminario

Sporting Cristal	5 - 0	Pacífico	Lima
I. Ávila 22', 55', 59'; J. Fernández 75'; J. Ross 87'	Report		Stadium: Est. A. Gallardo; Referee: Michael Espinoza

Alianza Lima	0 - 0	Sporting Cristal	Lima
	Report		Stadium: Est. A. Villanueva; Attendance: 24,561; Referee: Victor Hugo Carrillo

Sporting Cristal	5 - 2	Real Garcilaso	Lima
M. Valverde 9' (pen.); I. Ávila 30', 53', 83' (pen.); W. Chiroque 70'	Report	V. Ferreira 46'; A. Ramúa 63' (pen.)	Stadium: Est. A. Gallardo

Unión Comercio	0 - 2	Sporting Cristal	Moyobamba
	Report	I. Ávila 13'; J. Fernández 90'	Stadium: Estadio IPD de Moyobamba

Universidad César Vallejo	4 - 2	Sporting Cristal	Trujillo
G. Alemanno 1'; D. Chávez 47' 79'; A. Pando 88'	Report	H. Calcaterra 1'; M. Delgado 52'	Stadium: Estadio Mansiche

Sporting Cristal	4 - 1	FBC Melgar	Lima
J. Ross 5'; I. Ávila 29'; W. Chiroque 49'; C. Lobatón 64'	Report	B. Cuesta 87'	Stadium: Est. A. Gallardo

=== Copa Libertadores ===
==== Group stage ====
Pos	Team	Pld	W	D	L	GF	GA	GD	Pts
1	(Brazil) Palmeiras (A)	6	3	0	3	5	5	0	9
2	(Argentina) Tigre (A)	6	3	0	3	9	10	−1	9
3	(Paraguay) Libertad	6	2	2	2	10	9	+1	8
4	(Peru) Sporting Cristal	6	2	2	2	8	8	0	8

Source: RSSSF
(A) Advanced to round of 16

14 February 2013 1	Palmeiras (Brazil)	2 - 1	(Peru) Sporting Cristal	São Paulo, Brazil
22:00 UTC−2	Henrique 40'; Patrick Vieira 69'	Report	Lobatón 52' (pen.)	Stadium: Estádio do Pacaembu; Referee: Martín Vázquez (Uruguay)

28 February 2013 2	Sporting Cristal (Peru)	2 - 0	(Argentina) Tigre	Lima, Peru
21:45 UTC−5	Sheput 30'; Lobatón 58'	Report		Stadium: Estadio Alberto Gallardo; Referee: Julio Bascuñán (Chile)

6 March 2013 3	Libertad (Paraguay)	2 - 2	(Peru) Sporting Cristal	Asunción, Paraguay
19:45 UTC−3	Benítez 68'; Núñez 88'	Report	Ávila 25', 65'	Stadium: Estadio Dr. Nicolás Léoz; Referee: Hernando Buitrago (Colombia)

12 March 2013 4	Sporting Cristal (Peru)	1 - 1	(Paraguay) Libertad	Lima, Peru
19:45 UTC−3	Ávila 74'	Report	Velázquez 53'	Stadium: Estadio Alberto Gallardo; Referee: Roberto Silvera (Uruguay)

9 April 2013 5	Tigre (Argentina)	3 - 1	(Peru) Sporting Cristal	Victoria, Argentina
19:15 UTC−3	Leguizamón 24'; Pérez García 49'; Botta 54'	Report	Lobatón 71'	Stadium: Estadio José Dellagiovanna; Referee: Oscar Maldonado (Bolivia

18 April 2013 6	Sporting Cristal (Peru)	1 - 0	(Brazil) Palmeiras	Lima, Peru
20:15 UTC−5	Ávila 49'	Report		Stadium: Estadio Alberto Gallardo

Last updated: 9 February 2013
Source:Matches

== Statistics ==
=== Squad statistics ===
No.	Pos.	Name	Apps	Goals	Apps	Goals	Apps	Goals
No.	Pos.	Name	Descentralizado		Libertadores		Total	
1	GK	(Peru) Diego Penny	1	0	0	0	1	0
6	DF	(Peru) Marcos Delgado	1	0	0	0	1	0
7	MF	(Argentina) Horacio Calcaterra	0	0	0	0	0	0
8	DF	(Peru) Nelinho Quina	1	0	0	0	1	0
9	FW	(Peru) Hernán Rengifo	0	0	0	0	0	0
10	MF	(Peru) Renzo Sheput	1	0	0	0	1	0
11	FW	(Peru) Irven Ávila	1	0	0	0	1	0
12	GK	(Peru) Luis Araujo	0	0	0	0	0	0
13	DF	(Peru) Renzo Revoredo	1	0	0	0	1	0
15	DF	(Argentina) Nicolás Ayr	1	0	0	0	1	0
16	DF	(Peru) Marcio Valverde	0	0	0	0	0	0
17	FW	(Peru) Joazinho Arroé	1	0	0	0	1	0
18	DF	(Peru) Jesús Álvarez	1	0	0	0	1	0
19	DF	(Peru) Eduardo Uribe	1	0	0	0	1	0
20	MF	(Peru) Deyair Reyes	0	0	0	0	0	0
21	DF	(Peru) Martín Carpio	0	0	0	0	0	0
22	FW	(Peru) William Chiroque	1	0	0	0	1	0
23	MF	(Uruguay) Jorge Cazulo	1	0	0	0	1	0
24	FW	(Peru) Junior Ross	1	0	0	0	1	0
25	GK	(Peru) Luis Ortiz	0	0	0	0	0	0
27	MF	(Peru) Carlos Lobatón	1	1	0	0	1	1
27	MF	(Peru) Édison Chávez	0	0	0	0	0	0
29	FW	(Uruguay) Jonathan Ramírez	0	0	0	0	0	0

Last Updated February 9, 2013

=== Discipline ===
No.	Pos.	Name	Yellow card	Double yellow card	Red card	Yellow card	Double yellow card	Red card	Yellow card	Double yellow card	Red card			
No.	Pos.	Name	Descentralizado			Libertadores			Total					
No.	Pos.	Name	1	GK	(Peru) Diego Penny	0	0	0	0	0	0	0	0	0
6	DF	(Peru) Marcos Delgado	0	0	0	0	0	0	0	0	0			
7	MF	(Argentina) Horacio Calcaterra	0	0	0	0	0	0	0	0	0			
8	DF	(Peru) Nelinho Quina	1	0	0	0	0	0	1	0	0			
9	FW	(Peru) Hernán Rengifo	0	0	0	0	0	0	0	0	0			
10	MF	(Peru) Renzo Sheput	0	0	0	0	0	0	0	0	0			
11	FW	(Peru) Irven Ávila	0	0	0	0	0	0	0	0	0			
12	GK	(Peru) Luis Araujo	0	0	0	0	0	0	0	0	0			
13	DF	(Peru) Renzo Revoredo	0	0	0	0	0	0	0	0	0			
15	DF	(Argentina) Nicolás Ayr	0	0	0	0	0	0	0	0	0			
16	DF	(Peru) Marcio Valverde	0	0	0	0	0	0	0	0	0			
17	FW	(Peru) Joazinho Arroé	0	0	0	0	0	0	0	0	0			
18	DF	(Peru) Jesús Álvarez	0	0	0	0	0	0	0	0	0			
19	DF	(Peru) Eduardo Uribe	0	0	0	0	0	0	0	0	0			
20	MF	(Peru) Deyair Reyes	0	0	0	0	0	0	0	0	0			
21	DF	(Peru) Martín Carpio	0	0	0	0	0	0	0	0	0			
22	FW	(Peru) William Chiroque	0	0	0	0	0	0	0	0	0			
23	MF	(Uruguay) Jorge Cazulo	0	0	0	0	0	0	0	0	0			
24	FW	(Peru) Junior Ross	0	0	0	0	0	0	0	0	0			
25	GK	(Peru) Luis Ortiz	0	0	0	0	0	0	0	0	0			
27	MF	(Peru) Carlos Lobatón	0	0	0	0	0	0	0	0	0			
27	MF	(Peru) Édison Chávez	0	0	0	0	0	0	0	0	0			
29	FW	(Uruguay) Jonathan Ramírez	0	0	0	0	0	0	0	0	0			

Last Updated February 9, 2013

=== Goal Scorers ===
#	Player	Position	Goal
1	(Peru) Irven Ávila	Forward	10
2	(Peru) Renzo Sheput	Midfielder	8
3	(Peru) Carlos Lobatón	Midfielder	6
3	(Peru) Hernán Rengifo	Forward	6
5	(Argentina) Horacio Calcaterra	Midfielder	2
5	(Peru) Joazhiño Arroe	Midfielder	2
5	(Uruguay) Jorge Cazulo	Midfielder	2
5	(Peru) Renzo Revoredo	Defender	2
5	(Peru) William Chiroque	Midfielder	2
10	(Peru) Junior Ross	Forward	1
10	(Peru) Marcio Valverde	Defender	1
Own goals	2		
TOTAL			44

=== Overall ===
	Total	Home	Away
Games played	1	1	0
Games won	1	1	0
Games drawn	0	0	0
Games lost	0	0	0
Biggest win	-	-	-
Biggest loss	-	-	-
Clean sheets	1	1	0
Goals scored	1	1	0
Goals conceded	0	0	0
Average GF per game	1	1	0
Average GA per game	0	0	0

Last updated: 9 Feb 2013
Source: Competitive matches

== See also ==
- Club Sporting Cristal
- 2013 Torneo Descentralizado
