= 2012 Sporting Cristal season =

Sporting Cristal
2012 season
- President: Felipe Cantuarias
- Coach: Roberto Mosquera
- Stadium: San Martín de Porres (Start Season until May 2012, change name), Alberto Gallardo (from May 2012 until present), Lima
- Torneo Descentralizado: First Stage: First (1°); Second Stage: First (1°); Aggregate Table: First (1°); Final National: Champion; Champion National (1°)
Home colours	Away colours	Third colours

The 2012 Sporting Cristal season were the Fifty-Seventh (57.º) of the club from its foundation in 1955, Fifty-Seven (57) participations consecutives in the top-flight of Peruvian Primera División (of 96 Editions) with denomination Torneo Descentralizado. In Previous Season the club qualified as 10th Place of the 2011 Torneo Descentralizado.

Sporting Cristal were a of sixteen (16) clubs in the Forty-Seventh edition (47.º) Torneo Descentralizado, the competition most important of the Peruvian football. The club played the Peruvian Primera División. Sporting Cristal won their 16th Torneo Descentralizado Title, after seven years of failed attempts. The team finished the season first in the aggregate table and were undefeated at home during the entire season.

== Events ==
On February 12, 2012, Roberto Palacios played his last game in a Sporting Cristal jersey in a friendly match against San Martín in the Estadio Nacional.

Sporting Cristal were crowned champions of the 2012 Torneo Descentralizado on December 9, 2012 after defeating Real Garcilaso 1-0, at the Estadio Nacional.

== Club ==
=== Coaching staff ===
Position	Staff
Head coach	Roberto Mosquera
Fitness trainer	Eduardo Noriega, Sebastián Salvatore
Goalkeepers coach	Humberto Camino
Technical assistant	Duilio Cisneros
Match delegate	Maximiliano Frías
Doctors	Ramón Aparicio, Elisbán Linares
Physiotherapists	Antonio Rodas, Hugo Araujo
Equipment managers	Miguel Linares, Denys Refulio, Rodoldo Zavala

Source: clubsportingcristal.pe

=== Grounds ===
Ground (capacity and dimensions)	Estadio Alberto Gallardo (18,000 / 105x68m)

== Players ==
=== Squad information ===
As of 6 December 2012

Note: Flags indicate national team as defined under FIFA eligibility rules; some limited exceptions apply. Players may hold more than one non-FIFA nationality.

No.	Pos.	Nation	Player
1	GK	PER	Erick Delgado (Captain)
3	DF	PER	Giancarlo Peña
4	DF	PER	Walter Vilchez (vice-captain)
5	MF	PER	Oscar Vílchez
6	MF	PER	Marco Delgado
7	MF	PER	Renzo Sheput
8	MF	PER	Juan Carlos Mariño
9	FW	PER	Hernán Rengifo
11	FW	PER	Irven Ávila
12	GK	PER	Luis Araujo
13	MF	PER	Irwin Acuña
14	MF	PER	Yoshimar Yotún
15	DF	ARG	Nicolás Ayr

No.	Pos.	Nation	Player
16	MF	PER	Marcio Valverde
17	DF	PER	Luis Advíncula
18	FW	PER	José Shoro
19	DF	PER	Giancarlo Carmona
20	MF	PER	Deyair Reyes
23	MF	URU	Jorge Cazulo
24	FW	PER	Junior Ross
25	GK	PER	Luis Ortiz
26	MF	PER	Tarek Carranza
27	MF	PER	Carlos Lobatón
28	FW	PER	Gonzalo Sotomayor
29	MF	PER	Claudio Torrejón
30	FW	BRA	Leandro Franco

== Transfers ==
=== In ===
As of 6 December 2012

#	Pos.	Player	Transferred from	Type	Fee	Source
11	FW	(Peru) Irven Ávila	(Peru) Sport Huancayo	Transfer	Free	elcomercio.pe
30	FW	(Brazil) Leandro Franco	(Peru) Sport Boys	Transfer	Free	elcomercio.pe
19	MF	(Peru) Juan José Barros	(Peru) FBC Melgar	Transfer	Free	clubsportingcristal.pe
20	MF	(Peru) Deyair Reyes	(Peru) Sport Huancayo	Transfer	Free	peru.com
6	MF	(Peru) Marcos Delgado	(Peru) Sport Huancayo	Transfer	Free	peru.com
8	MF	(Peru) Juan Carlos Mariño	(Peru) Cienciano	Transfer	Free	elcomercio.pe
7	MF	(Peru) Renzo Sheput	(Peru) Juan Aurich	Transfer	Free	terra.com.pe
23	MF	(Uruguay) Jorge Cazulo	(Peru) C.D. Universidad César Vallejo	Transfer	Free	larepublica.pe
12	GK	(Peru) Elexander Araujo	(Peru) Inti Gas Deportes	Transfer	Free	netjoven.pe
15	DF	(Argentina) Nicolás Ayr	(Colombia) Atlético Huila	Transfer	Free	elcomercio.pe
28	MF	(Peru) Gonzalo Sotomayor	(Peru) Coronel Bolognesi	Transfer	Free	
9	FW	(Peru) Hernán Rengifo	(Cyprus) AC Omonia	Transfer	Free	clubsportingcristal.pe
5	MF	(Peru) Oscar Vílchez	(Peru) Alianza Lima	Transfer	Free	clubsportingcristal.pe
18	DF	(Peru) Jesús Álvarez	(Peru) CD Universidad San Martín	Transfer	Free	clubsportingcristal.pe
19	DF	(Peru) Giancarlo Carmona	(Argentina) San Lorenzo de Almagro	Loan	Free	clubsportingcristal.pe
17	DF	(Peru) Luis Advíncula	(Ukraine) SC Tavriya Simferopol	Loan	Free	clubsportingcristal.pe

=== Out ===
As of 6 December 2012

#	Pos.	Player	Transferred To	Type	Fee	Source
10	MF	(Peru) Roberto Palacios	Retired		Free	fifa.com
5	MF	(Argentina) Alejandro Frezzotti	Free Agent	Transfer	Free	
12	GK	(Peru) Manuel Heredia	Free Agent	Transfer	Free	
19	FW	(Peru) Juan Diego González-Vigil	Free Agent	Transfer	Free	
2	DF	(Peru) Wenceslao Fernández	Free Agent	Transfer	Free	
21	MF	(Mexico) Rodolfo Espinoza	Free Agent	Transfer	Free	
25	GK	(Peru) Julio Aliaga	Free Agent	Transfer	Free	
5	MF	(Peru) Diego Chávarri	Free Agent	Transfer	Free	
3	DF	(Argentina) Germán Rivera	Free Agent	Transfer	Free	
7	MF	(Peru) Yancarlo Casas	(Peru) Cienciano	Transfer	Free	
8	MF	(Peru) Minzum Quina	(Peru) León de Huánuco	Transfer	Free	
20	DF	(Peru) Juan Lojas	(Peru) León de Huánuco	Transfer	Free	
18	FW	(Uruguay) Miguel Ximénez	(Peru) Universitario de Deportes	Transfer	Free	
23	FW	(Peru) Piero Alva	(Bolivia) Oriente Petrolero	Transfer	Free	
13	DF	(Peru) Renzo Revoredo	(Paraguay) Club Olimpia	Transfer	Free	
19	MF	(Peru) Juan José Barros	(Chile) Cobreloa	Transfer	Free	
17	MF	(Peru) Luis Advíncula	(Ukraine) Tavriya Simferopol	Transfer	$300,000	
28	DF	(Peru) Jose Granda	(Peru) Real Garcilaso	Transfer	Free	
22	DF	(Peru) Willy Rivas	(Peru) Club Universitario de Deportes	Transfer	Free	
11	FW	(Peru) Iván Bulos	(Belgium) Standard Liège	Transfer	Free	

== Competitions ==
=== Overall ===
This season Sporting Cristal will participate in the 2012 Torneo Descentralizado.

Competition	Started round	Current position / round	Final position / round	First match	Last match
Torneo Descentralizado	—	1st	1st	19 February 2012	9 December 2012

Updated to match played 15 Jul 2012
Source: Competitions

=== Torneo Descentralizado ===
==== Results summary ====
Overall								Home						Away					
Pld	W	D	L	GF	GA	GD	Pts	W	D	L	GF	GA	GD	W	D	L	GF	GA	GD
44	25	11	8	93	44	+49	86	16	6	0	59	16	+43	9	5	8	34	28	+6

Last updated: 10 Nov 2012.
Source: Competitive matches

==== Results by round ====
Round	1	2	3	4	5	6	7	8	9	10	11	12	13	14	15	16	17	18	19	20	21	22	23	24	25	26	27	28	29	30	31	32	33	34	35	36	37	38	39	40	41	42	43	44
Ground	H	A	H	A	H	A	H	A	H	A	H	A	H	H	A	A	H	A	H	A	H	A	H	A	H	H	A	A	A	H	H	H	A	A	H	H	A	A	H	A	H	A	A	H
Result	W	W	D	W	W	L	D	D	W	D	D	L	W	W	L	L	W	W	W	L	W	W	W	W	D	W	D	L	W	W	W	W	W	D	W	D	W	L	W	D	W	L	W	D
Position	4	1	1	1	1	1	2	2	2	3	3	4	3	2	3	3	3	3	2	3	3	2	1	1	1	1	1	1	1	1	1	1	1	1	1	1	1	1	1	1	1	1	1	1

Updated to match(es) played on 10 Dec 2012. Source: Matches
A = Away; H = Home; W = Win; D = Draw; L = Loss

==== First stage ====
Win Draw Loss

18 February 2012 1	Sporting Cristal	2 – 1	Cobresol	Lima
15:30 (UTC-05)	Salazar 27'; Adrianzén 54'	Report	Cordero 51'	Stadium: Estadio Alberto Gallardo; Attendance: 3,087; Referee: Fredy Arellanos

3 March 2012 2	Sport Boys	0 – 5	Sporting Cristal	Callao
19:50 (UTC-05)	Olaya (red card) 29'; Iglesias (yellow card) 77'; Rioja (yellow card) 90'	Report	Cazulo (yellow card) 7'; Lobatón 20'; Rengifo (yellow card) 22', (goal) 57', 76'; Ross 63'; Mariño 88'	Stadium: Estadio Miguel Grau; Attendance: 3,254; Referee: Miguel Santiváñez

10 March 2012 3	Sporting Cristal	1 – 1	Universitario	Lima
19:45 (UTC-05)	Yotún (yellow card) 54' (yellow-red card) 90+4'; Rengifo 57'; Ávila (yellow card) 90+2'	Result	Duarte (yellow card) 41' (yellow-red card) 67'; Dávila (yellow card) 51'; Gonzáles (yellow card) 73'; Chirinos 80'	Stadium: Estadio Alberto Gallardo; Attendance: 34,529; Referee: Manuel Garay

18 March 2012 4	León de Huánuco	2 – 3	Sporting Cristal	Huánuco
13:15 (UTC-05)	Zegarra 57' (pen.), (yellow card) 60'; Vásquez (yellow card) 76'; Salas (yellow card) 80'; Quina 82'	Report	Sheput 7' (pen.); Reyes (yellow card) 17'; Cazulo (yellow card) 30'; Ávila 45+1'; Delgado (yellow card) 54' (yellow-red card) 60'; Ross 67'; Valverde (yellow card) 89'	Stadium: Estadio Heraclio Tapia; Attendance: 4,981; Referee: Henry Gambetta

25 March 2012 5	Sporting Cristal	3 – 0	Real Garcilaso	Lima
15:30 (UTC-05)	Ross 2'; Mariño (yellow card) 89', (goal) 88'; Sheput 57' (pen.)	Report	Reyes (yellow card) 33'; Vildoso (yellow card) 37'; Uribe (yellow card) 42'; Herrera (yellow card) 54'	Stadium: Estadio Alberto Gallardo; Attendance: 15,117; Referee: Victor Hugo Carrillo

31 March 2012 6	Universidad San Martín	2 – 1	Sporting Cristal	Lima
16:00 (UTC-05)	Ramos 22', (yellow card) 52'; Cueva 32'; Ballón (yellow card) 38'; Espinoza (yellow card) 56'; Cardoza (red card) 58'; Molina (yellow card) 69'	Report	Cazulo (yellow card) 4' (yellow-red card) 60'; Vílchez (yellow card) 25'; Sheput 71' (pen.); Valverde (yellow card) 90+3'	Stadium: Estadio Nacional; Attendance: 12,379; Referee: Georges Buckley

7 April 2012 7	Sporting Cristal	2 – 2	Universidad César Vallejo	Lima
15:30 (UTC-05)	Rengifo 55' 90+4'; Vílchez (yellow card) 58'; Vílchez 60' (o.g.); Valverde (yellow card) 90+5'	Report	Morales (yellow card) 13'; Jimenez 44'; Velásquez (yellow card) 84'; De la Haza (yellow card) 84'; Sotil (yellow card) 87'	Stadium: Estadio Alberto Gallardo; Attendance: 13,450; Referee: Víctor Hugo Rivera

15 April 2012 8	Unión Comercio	1 – 1	Sporting Cristal	Moyobamba
12:30 (UTC-05)	Trauco (yellow card) 74'; Sosa (yellow card) 81'; Pacheco 89'	Report	Rengifo 29' (yellow card) 56'; Advíncula (yellow card) 73'	Stadium: Estadio IPD de Moyobamba; Attendance: 2,353; Referee: Fredy Arellanos

22 April 2012 9	Sporting Cristal	3 – 1	FBC Melgar	Lima
11:30 (UTC-05)	Ávila 2' 34'; Rengifo 14'; Reyes (yellow card) 65'; Cazulo (yellow card) 79'	Report	Ojeda (yellow card) 63'; Salas 85'	Stadium: Estadio Alberto Gallardo; Attendance: 6,978; Referee: Iván Chang

29 April 2012 10	Sport Huancayo	1 – 1	Sporting Cristal	Huancayo
13:15 (UTC-05)	Cruzado 35'; Guevara (yellow card) 38'; Mendoza (yellow card) 50'; Figueroa (yellow card) 86'; López (yellow card) 86'	Report	Valverde (yellow card) 41'; Yotún 62'	Stadium: Estadio Huancayo; Attendance: 5,100; Referee: Víctor Hugo Carrillo

2 May 2012 11	Sporting Cristal	1 – 1	Alianza Lima	Lima
17:45 (UTC-05)	Cazulo (yellow card) 29'; Lobatón 75'; Ayr (yellow card) 78'; Valverde (yellow card) 90+3'	Report	Rabanal (yellow card) 41'; Fernández 46'; Neyra (yellow card) 86'	Stadium: Estadio Nacional; Referee: Fredy Arellanos

6 May 2012 12	Inti Gas Deportes	2 – 1	Sporting Cristal	Ayacucho
12:45 (UTC-05)	Palacios (yellow card) 21'; Mendoza (yellow card) 29' (red card) 30'; Oliveira 66' (pen.); Ibarra (yellow card) 67'; Corcuera (yellow card) 80'	Report	Mariño 54' (yellow card) 55' (yellow card) 61' (red card); Álvarez (yellow card) 65' (yellow card) 69' (red card); Advíncula (yellow card) 83'	Stadium: Estadio Ciudad de Cumaná; Attendance: 7,926; Referee: Miguel Santiváñez

12 May 2012 13	Sporting Cristal	4 – 0	Cienciano	Lima
15:30 (UTC-05)	Rengifo 14'; Sheput (yellow card) 30' (goal) 36'; Ross 44'; Ávila 87'	Report		Stadium: Estadio Alberto Gallardo; Attendance: 4,574; Referee: Luis Garay

19 May 2012 14	Sporting Cristal	4 – 0	José Gálvez	Lima
15:30 (UTC-05)	Ávila 7'; Ross (yellow card) 16'; Mariño 45'; Cazulo 65'; Rengifo 79'	Report	Arzuaga (yellow card) 8'; Calderón (yellow card) 20'; Ramos (yellow card) 53'	Stadium: Estadio Alberto Gallardo; Attendance: 3,567; Referee: Alberto Lozano

27 May 2012 15	Juan Aurich	1 – 0	Sporting Cristal	Chiclayo
16:00 (UTC-05)	Khan 30'; Rojas (yellow card) 60'; Tejada (red card) 60'; Quina (yellow card) 79'	Report	Advíncula (yellow card) 43'; Lobatón (red card) 60'; Shoro (yellow card) 75'	Stadium: Estadio Elías Aguirre; Attendance: 10,960; Referee: Georges Buckley

17 Jun 2012 16	Cobresol	1 – 0	Sporting Cristal	Moquegua
11:30 (UTC-05)	Enahoro 8' (yellow card) 45'; Soto (yellow card) 45+1'; Campos (yellow card) 58'	Report	Álvarez (yellow card) 41'	Stadium: Estadio 25 de Noviembre; Attendance: 3,758; Referee: Julio Álvarez

23 Jun 2012 17	Sporting Cristal	3 – 1	Sport Boys	Lima
15:00 (UTC-05)	Ross 72' 75'; Franco 90+2'	Report	Gómez (yellow card) 20'; Orejuela 89' (pen.)	Stadium: Estadio Alberto Gallardo; Attendance: 4,305; Referee: Iván Chang

28 Jun 2012 18	Universitario	0 – 2	Sporting Cristal	Callao
20:30 (UTC-05)	Polo (yellow card) 54'; Galliquio (yellow card) 65'; Torres (red card) 75'	Report	Álvarez (yellow card) 16'; Ayr 34'; Cazulo (yellow card) 45+1'; Lobatón (yellow card) 65'; Ross 76'	Stadium: Estadio Nacional; Attendance: 25,161; Referee: Víctor Hugo Rivera

1 Jul 2012 19	Sporting Cristal	1 – 0	León de Huánuco	Lima
11:30 (UTC-05)	Delgado 76' (yellow card) 50' (yellow card) 72' (red card); Advíncula (yellow card) 59'	Report	Araujo (yellow card) 63'; Masías (yellow card) 65'; Zapata (yellow card) 78'; Cruz (yellow card) 89'; Hidalgo (yellow card) 90+2'	Stadium: Estadio Alberto Gallardo; Attendance: 6,177; Referee: Manuel Garay

5 Jul 2012 20	Real Garcilaso	3 – 0	Sporting Cristal	Cuzco
12:00 (UTC-05)	Herrera (yellow card) 30'; Ciucci 45'; Rodríguez (yellow card) 48' (goal) 71'; Pando 67'; Alloco (yellow card) 88'	Report	Ávila (yellow card) 31'	Stadium: Inca Garcilaso de la Vega; Attendance: 5,880; Referee: Georges Buckley

8 Jul 2012 21	Sporting Cristal	4 – 1	Universidad San Martín	Lima
11:00 (UTC-05)	Ross 35'; Álvarez (yellow card) 45'; Ávila 51' 64'; Rengifo 67'	Report	Ramos 34' (yellow card) 45+1'; Corzo (yellow card) 80'	Stadium: Estadio Alberto Gallardo; Attendance: 5,443; Referee: Diego Haro

11 Jul 2012 22	Universidad César Vallejo	2 – 3	Sporting Cristal	Trujillo
20:00 (UTC-05)	Solis (yellow card) 7'; Sánchez (yellow card) 21'; Velásquez 33'; Guizasola (yellow card) 38'; Jiménez 62'; Galván (yellow card) 83'	Report	Ávila 5' (yellow card) 38'; Cazulo (yellow card) 45' (goal) 71'; Rengifo 51'; Franco (yellow card) 90+1'	Stadium: Estadio Mansiche; Attendance: 16,902; Referee: Henry Gambetta

15 Jul 2012 23	Sporting Cristal	2 – 0	Unión Comercio	Lima
11:30 (UTC-05)	Ross 21'; Ávila 41'; Advíncula (yellow card) 50'	Report	Trauco (yellow card) 50'; Céliz (yellow card) 61'; Molina (yellow card) 79'; Casas (yellow card) 84'	Stadium: Estadio Alberto Gallardo; Attendance: 8,348; Referee: Víctor Hugo Carrillo

18 Jul 2012 24	FBC Melgar	1 – 2	Sporting Cristal	Arequipa
13:15 (UTC-05)	Ojeda (yellow card) 33'; García (yellow card) 38'; Contreras 60'	Report	Ayr (yellow card) 14'; Granda (yellow card) 36' (goal) 42'; Delgado (yellow card) 70'; Ávila 72'; Mariño (yellow card) 87'	Stadium: Estadio de la UNSA; Referee: Georges Buckley

22 Jul 2012 25	Sporting Cristal	2 - 2	Sport Huancayo	Lima
12:30 (UTC-05)	Ross 35'; Rengifo 81'	Report	Mendoza (yellow card) 10'; Willyan Mimbela 55', 76' (yellow card) 79'; Renzo Reaños (yellow card) 84'	Stadium: Estadio Alberto Gallardo; Attendance: 8,724; Referee: Victor Rivera

29 Jul 2012 27	Sporting Cristal	2 - 0	Inti Gas Deportes	Lima
16:30 (UTC-05)	Marcos Delgado 66'; Sheput 83'	Report	Carlos Ibarra (yellow card) 52'; Fernando de Oliveira (yellow card) 75'; Miguel Llanos (yellow card) 87'	Stadium: Estadio Alberto Gallardo; Attendance: 6,343; Referee: Yonani Quevedo

2 Aug 2012 26	Alianza Lima	1 - 1	Sporting Cristal	Lima
19:00 (UTC-05)	Vidales 4'; Guerrero (yellow card) 28'; Viza (yellow card) 84'; Beltrán (yellow card) 90'	Report	Lobatón (yellow card) 21'; Sheput (yellow card) 28' (goal) 34'; Delgado (yellow card) 56'; Yotún (yellow card) 65'; Ávila (yellow card) 75'; Valverde (yellow card) 86'	Stadium: Matute; Attendance: 17,584; Referee: Vìctor Hugo Carrillo

4 Aug 2012 28	Cienciano	2 - 1	Sporting Cristal	Cuzco
13:15 (UTC-05)	Pizarro 21'; Rivero (yellow card) 31' (goal) 36' (yellow card) (red card) 45+3'; Cisneros (yellow card) 45+4'; García (yellow card) 71'	Report	Mariño (yellow card) 38'; Cazulo 76'; Ayr (yellow card) 90+3'	Stadium: Inca Garcilaso de la Vega; Attendance: 10,221; Referee: Iván Chang

7 Aug 2012 29	José Gálvez	0 - 2	Sporting Cristal	Chimbote
16:00 (UTC-05)	Medina (yellow card) 72'; Calderón (yellow card) 73'; Reyes (yellow card) 90'	Report	Ross 11'; Lobatón (yellow card) 44'; Sheput (yellow card) 71'; Mariño (yellow card) 80' (goal) 90' (pen.); Álvarez (yellow card) 86'	Stadium: Estadio Manuel Rivera Sanchez; Attendance: 8,866; Referee: Henry Gambetta

11 Aug 2012 30	Sporting Cristal	5 - 1	Juan Aurich	Lima
15:30 (UTC-05)	Ávila 10' 51'; Mariño (yellow card) 35'; Valverde (yellow card) 37'; Ross 66'; Carranza (yellow card) 78'; Rengifo 85'; Franco 90+1'	Report	Valencia 35'; Barrios (yellow card) 40'; Minaya (yellow card) 43'; Tejada (yellow card) 74'	Stadium: Estadio Alberto Gallardo; Attendance: 10,076; Referee: Víctor Hugo Rivera

==== Second Stage - Liguilla A ====
Win Draw Loss

19 August 2012 31	Sporting Cristal	1 - 0	Sport Huancayo	Lima
11:30 (UTC-05)	Rengifo 2'; Yotún (yellow card) 44'	Report	Mendoza (yellow card) 22'; Ibarra (yellow card) 45+2'; López (yellow card) 45+2' (yellow-red card) 79'	Stadium: Estadio Alberto Gallardo; Attendance: 4,069; Referee: Fredy Arellanos

9 September 2012 32	Cobresol	0 - 2	Sporting Cristal	Moquegua
13:30 (UTC-05)	Galfráscoli (yellow card) 56'	Report	Franco 13'; Ayr (yellow card) 63'; Carmona (yellow card) 77'; Sheput 88'	Stadium: Estadio 25 de Noviembre; Attendance: 2,432; Referee: Diego Haro

2 September 2012 33	Sporting Cristal	3 - 1	Universidad San Martín	Lima
11:30 (UTC-05)	Cazulo (yellow card) 12'; Ávila 36'; Advíncula (yellow card) 65'; Mariño 76'; Carranza 83'	Report	Ubierna (yellow card) 18'; Perea 68' (pen.); Molina (yellow card) 88'	Stadium: Estadio Alberto Gallardo; Attendance: 6,068; Referee: Julio Álvarez

15 September 2012 34	Inti Gas Deportes	1 - 1	Sporting Cristal	Moquegua
13:30 (UTC-05)	Ibarra 19'	Report	Ávila 45+2'; Carmona (yellow card) 80'; Delgado (yellow card) 86'	Stadium: Estadio 25 de Noviembre; Attendance: 3,769; Referee: Luis Garay

23 September 2012 35	Sporting Cristal	2 - 0	José Gálvez	Lima
15:00 (UTC-05)	Sheput 88' (pen.); Lobatón (yellow card) 32' (goal) 50'; Carmona (yellow card) 74'	Report	Ramos (yellow card) 4'; Ángeles (yellow card) 28'; Alvarado (yellow card) 52'	Stadium: Estadio Alberto Gallardo; Attendance: 4,650; Referee: Luis Seminario

20 September 2012 36	Sporting Cristal	1 - 1	Universitario	Lima
20:00 (UTC-05)	Advíncula (yellow card) 29' (yellow-red card) 57'; Yotún (yellow card) 35'; Lobatón (yellow card) 67'; Mariño 90+2' (pen.)	Report	Galliquio (yellow card) 19'; Gonzales (yellow card) 30'; Chávez (yellow card) 35'; Calcaterra (yellow card) 53'; Ampuero 68'; Vargas (yellow card) 85'	Stadium: Estadio Nacional; Attendance: 22,341; Referee: Iván Chang

9 October 2012 37	Cienciano	1 - 2	Sporting Cristal	Cuzco
19:00 (UTC-05)				Stadium: Inca Garcilaso de la Vega

21 October 2012 38	Sport Huancayo	3 - 1	Sporting Cristal	Huancayo
11:30 (UTC-05)	Figueroa (yellow card) 19'; Formento 22'; Mendoza 40'; Mimbela 90+3'	Report	Álvarez (yellow card) 25'; Advíncula (yellow card) 34'; Ávila 53'	Stadium: Estadio Huancayo; Attendance: 5,280; Referee: Georges Buckley

27 October 2012 39	Sporting Cristal	6 - 0	Cobresol	Lima
15:15 (UTC-05)	Valverde 7'; Ross 13', 26', 30'; Vílchez 55'; Franco 80'	Report		Stadium: Estadio Alberto Gallardo; Attendance: 2,867; Referee: L. Garay Evia

30 October 2012 40	Universidad San Martín	1 - 1	Sporting Cristal	Lima
11:30 (UTC-05)	Perea 90'	Report	Rengifo 45'	Stadium: Estadio Monumental; Attendance: 860; Referee: Victor Hugo Rivera

4 November 2012 41	Sporting Cristal	4 - 0	Inti Gas Deportes	Lima
11:30 (UTC-05)	Sheput 10', 62' (pen.); Rengifo 43'; Cazulo 71'	Report		Stadium: Estadio Alberto Gallardo; Attendance: 3,413; Referee: F. Legario

9 November 2012 42	José Gálvez	3 - 1	Sporting Cristal	Chimbote
11:30 (UTC-05)	Salcedo 1'; Atoche 60'; Mesarina 76'	Report	Sheput 24'	Stadium: Estadio Manuel Rivera Sanchez; Attendance: 4,799; Referee: R. Rafael

18 November 2012 43	Universitario	0 - 3	Sporting Cristal	Lima
15:30 (UTC-05)		Report	Yotún 14'; Ayr 26'; Mariño 63' (pen.)	Stadium: Estadio Monumental; Attendance: 30,000; Referee: D. Haro

25 November 2012 44	Sporting Cristal	3 - 3	Cienciano	Lima
11:30 (UTC-05)	Saavedra 73'; Acuña 80'; Valverde 84' (pen.)	Report	Ísmodes 53'; Rivero 58'; Pizarro 66' (pen.)	Stadium: Estadio Alberto Gallardo; Attendance: 3,109; Referee: R. López

==== Playoff Finals ====
The Third Stage will be the finals (also known as the Play-off) of the 2012 season between the winners of each group of the Second Stage. As Sporting Cristal had the most points on the aggregate table, Sporting Cristal decided which leg they will play as the home team. They will also choose the venue of the third match in case both teams are tied on points after the second leg.

December 2, 2012
13:00
First leg

Real Garcilaso	0 – 1	Sporting Cristal
	Report	Ross 33'

Estadio Garcilaso
Attendance: 29,139
Referee: Victor Hugo Rivera

December 9, 2012
15:00
Second leg

Sporting Cristal	1 – 0	Real Garcilaso
Ross 24'	Report

Estadio Nacional
Attendance: 38,660
Referee: Victor Hugo Carrillo

== Squad statistics ==
=== Goal Scorers ===
#	Player	Position	Goal
1	(Peru) Junior Ross	Forward	17
2	(Peru) Hernán Rengifo	Forward	16
3	(Peru) Irven Ávila	Forward	15
4	(Peru) Renzo Sheput	Midfielder	11
5	(Peru) Juan Carlos Mariño	Midfielder	8
6	(Peru) Carlos Lobatón	Midfielder	5
7	(Uruguay) Jorge Cazulo	Midfielder	4
7	(Brazil) Leandro Franco	Forward	4
9	(Peru) Marcos Delgado	Defender	2
9	(Argentina) Nicolás Ayr	Defender	2
9	(Peru) Marcio Valverde	Defender	2
9	(Peru) Yoshimar Yotún	Defender	2
13	(Peru) Irwing Acuña	Midfielder	1
13	(Peru) Christian Adrianzén	Midfielder	1
13	(Peru) Tarek Carranza	Midfielder	1
13	(Peru) José Granda	Defender	1
13	(Peru) Pier Saavedra	Forward	1
13	(Peru) Edson Salazar	Forward	1
13	(Peru) Óscar Vílchez	Midfielder	1
TOTAL			95

=== Overall ===
	Total	Home	Away
Games played	46	23	23
Games won	27	17	10
Games drawn	11	6	5
Games lost	8	0	8
Biggest win	6–0 vs Cobresol	6–0 vs Cobresol	5–0 vs Sport Boys
Biggest loss	0–3 vs Real Garcilaso	-	0–3 vs Real Garcilaso
Clean sheets	17	11	6
Goals scored	95	60	35
Goals conceded	44	16	28

Last updated: 10 Dec 2012
Source: Competitive matches

== See also ==
- Club Sporting Cristal
- 2012 Torneo Descentralizado
