= 2014 Sporting Cristal season =

Sporting Cristal
2014 season
- President: Felipe Cantuarias
- Coach: Daniel Ahmed
- Stadium: Alberto Gallardo, Lima
- Torneo Descentralizado: Torneo Apertura: Thirteenth (13°); Torneo Clausura: First (1°) Champion; Aggregate Table: Third (3°); Final National: Champion; Champions National (1°)
- Torneo del Inca: Group stage (Fourth (4°) Group B)
- Copa Libertadores: First stage
| Home colours | Away colours | Third colours |

The 2014 Sporting Cristal season were the Fifty-Nineth (59.º) of the club from its foundation in 1955, Fifty-Nine (59) participations consecutives in the top-flight of Peruvian Primera División (of 98 Editions) with denomination Torneo Descentralizado. In Previous Season the club qualified as 3rd Place of the 2013 Torneo Descentralizado.

Sporting Cristal were a of sixteen (16) clubs in the Forty-Nineth edition (49.º) Torneo Descentralizado, the competition most important of the Peruvian football. The club played the Peruvian Primera División and Copa Libertadores for second consecutive year and for Thirtieth (30th) Time. Sporting Cristal won their 17th Torneo Descentralizado Title.

== Club ==
=== Coaching staff ===
| Position | Staff |
|---|---|
| Head coach | Daniel Ahmed |
| Assistant coach | Mariano Sosso |
| Fitness trainer | Marcelo Fernandez |
| Goalkeepers coach | David Acaro |
| Technical assistant | Julio Espejo |
| Match delegate | Nicolás Peremolte |
| Doctors | |
| Physiotherapists | |
| Equipment managers | Miguel Linares, Denys Refulio, Rodoldo Zavala |

Source: clubsportingcristal.pe

=== Grounds ===
| Ground (capacity and dimensions) | Estadio Alberto Gallardo (18,000 / 105x68m) |

== Players ==
=== Squad information ===
As of 7 January 2014

Note: Flags indicate national team as defined under FIFA eligibility rules; some limited exceptions apply. Players may hold more than one non-FIFA nationality.

| No. | Pos. | Nation | Player |
|---|---|---|---|
| 1 | GK | PER | Diego Penny |
| 6 | DF | PER | Marcos Delgado |
| 7 | MF | ARG | Horacio Calcaterra |
| 10 | MF | PER | Renzo Sheput |
| 11 | FW | PER | Irven Ávila |
| 12 | GK | PER | Luis Araujo |
| 13 | DF | PER | Renzo Revoredo |
| 17 | FW | PER | Joazinho Arroé |
| 18 | DF | PER | Jesús Álvarez |
| 23 | MF | URU | Jorge Cazulo |
| 24 | FW | PER | Junior Ross |

| No. | Pos. | Nation | Player |
|---|---|---|---|
| 27 | MF | PER | Carlos Lobatón (Captain) |
| -- | DF | PER | Marcos Ortiz |
| -- | MF | PER | Carlo Urquiaga |
| -- | MF | PER | Pier Larrauri |
| -- | DF | PER | Alexis Cossio |
| -- | MF | PER | William Mimbela |
| -- | MF | PER | Pedro Aquino |
| -- | FW | PER | Alexander Succar |
| -- | FW | PER | Luiz Da Silva |
| -- | GK | PER | Carlos Grados |
| -- | DF | PER | Luis Rivas |

== Transfers ==
=== In ===
As of 7 January 2014.

| # | Pos. | Player | Transferred from | Type | Fee | Ref |
|---|---|---|---|---|---|---|
| | MW | (Peru) Paolo De La Haza | (Peru) César Vallejo | Transfer | Free | |
| | MW | (Argentina) Mario Leguizamón | (Argentina) Tigre | Transfer | Free | |
| | FW | (Argentina) Maximiliano Núñez | (Argentina) All Boys | Transfer | Free | |
| | DF | (Peru) Adán Balbín | (Peru) Universidad San Martín | Transfer | Free | |
| | DF | (Peru) Luis Advíncula | (Germany) Hoffenheim | Loan | | |
| | DF | (Peru) Yoshimar Yotún | (Brazil) Vasco da Gama | Transfer | Free | |
| | DF | (Peru) Brian Bernaola | (Peru) Esther Grande de Bentín | Transfer | Free | |
| | FW | (Peru) Ray Sandoval | (Peru) Universidad San Martín | Transfer | Free | |

=== Out ===
As of 7 January 2014.

| # | Pos. | Player | Transferred To | Type | Fee | Source |
|---|---|---|---|---|---|---|
| 8 | DF | (Peru) Nelinho Quina | (Peru) Melgar | Transfer | | depor.pe |
| 9 | FW | (Peru) Hernán Rengifo | (Peru) Juan Aurich | Transfer | | libero.pe |
| 15 | DF | (Argentina) Nicolás Ayr | | Transfer | | rpp.com |
| 16 | DF | (Peru) Marcio Valverde | (Peru) UTC | Transfer | | rpp.com |
| 19 | DF | (Peru) Eduardo Uribe | (Peru) UTC | Transfer | | americatv.com |
| 22 | FW | (Peru) William Chiroque | (Peru) César Vallejo | Transfer | | peru.com |
| 29 | FW | (Uruguay) Jonathan Ramírez | | Transfer | | depor.pe |
| | FW | (Peru) José Carlos Fernández | (Argentina) Argentinos Juniors | Loan Return | Free | depor.pe |

== Pre-season and friendlies ==
Win Draw Loss

| 11 January 2014 Copa Bandes | Vélez Sársfield (Argentina) | 0-1 | (Peru) Sporting Cristal | Montevideo, Uruguay |
| 18:00 (UTC-05) | | | | Stadium: Estadio Centenario |

| 21 January 2014 Friendly | Sporting Cristal (Peru) | 1-2 | (Ecuador) Emelec | Lima, Peru |
| 21:00 (UTC-05) | | | | Stadium: Estadio Nacional |

Last updated: 7 January 2014

== Competitions ==
=== Overall ===
| Competition | Started round | Final position / round | First match | Last match |
|---|---|---|---|---|
| Torneo Descentralizado | Torneo del Inca | Champions | Feb 15 | Dec 21 |
| Copa Libertadores | First Stage | First Stage | Jan 29 | Feb 5 |

=== Torneo Descentralizado ===
==== Torneo del Inca ====
Group A
| Pos | Team | Pld | W | D | L | GF | GA | GD | Pts |
|---|---|---|---|---|---|---|---|---|---|
| 3 | León de Huánuco | 14 | 6 | 6 | 2 | 20 | 15 | +5 | 24 |
| 4 | Sporting Cristal | 14 | 5 | 5 | 4 | 26 | 21 | +5 | 20 |
| 5 | Real Garcilaso | 14 | 5 | 4 | 5 | 20 | 15 | +5 | 19 |

Win Draw Loss

| Real Garcilaso | 1-1 | Sporting Cristal |

| Sporting Cristal | 3-0 | León de Huánuco |

| Sporting Cristal | 5-2 | Unión Comercio |

| Inti Gas | 1-3 | Sporting Cristal |

| Sporting Cristal | 2-2 | Alianza Lima |

| Juan Aurich | 5-1 | Sporting Cristal |

| Sporting Cristal | 1-1 | San Simón |

| Sporting Cristal | 0-3 | Real Garcilaso |

| León de Huánuco | 1-1 | Sporting Cristal |

| Unión Comercio | 1-1 | Sporting Cristal |

| Sporting Cristal | 5-1 | Inti Gas |

| Alianza Lima | 1-0 | Sporting Cristal |

| Sporting Cristal | 2-0 | Juan Aurich |

| San Simón | 2-1 | Sporting Cristal |

==== Torneo Apertura ====
| Pos | Team | Pld | W | D | L | GF | GA | GD | Pts |
|---|---|---|---|---|---|---|---|---|---|
| 12 | UTC | 15 | 4 | 6 | 5 | 15 | 21 | -6 | 18 |
| 13 | Sporting Cristal | 15 | 4 | 5 | 6 | 26 | 19 | +7 | 17 |
| 14 | Sport Huancayo | 15 | 4 | 3 | 8 | 22 | 34 | -12 | 15 |

===== Results =====
| Home \ Away | ALI | CIE | IGD | JA | LEÓ | MEL | CAI | RGA | SSM | CRI | SHU | UCO | UCV | USM | UTC | UNI |
|---|---|---|---|---|---|---|---|---|---|---|---|---|---|---|---|---|
| Alianza Lima | | | | | | | | | | 2–1 | | | | | | |
| Cienciano | | | | | | | | | | 1–1 | | | | | | |
| Inti Gas | | | | | | | | | | | | | | | | |
| Juan Aurich | | | | | | | | | | 3–4 | | | | | | |
| León de Huánuco | | | | | | | | | | | | | | | | |
| Melgar | | | | | | | | | | | | | | | | |
| Los Caimanes | | | | | | | | | | | | | | | | |
| Real Garcilaso | | | | | | | | | | 2–1 | | | | | | |
| San Simón | | | | | | | | | | | | | | | | |
| Sporting Cristal | | | 3–0 | | 4–0 | 1–2 | 1–1 | | 6–0 | | 1–2 | | | 0–0 | | |
| Sport Huancayo | | | | | | | | | | | | | | | | |
| Unión Comercio | | | | | | | | | | 2–0 | | | | | | |
| Universidad César Vallejo | | | | | | | | | | 3–2 | | | | | | |
| Universidad San Martín | | | | | | | | | | | | | | | | |
| UTC | | | | | | | | | | 1–1 | | | | | | |
| Universitario | | | | | | | | | | 0–0 | | | | | | |

Updated to match(es) played on February 2014. Source: ADFP - official fixture
Legend: Blue = home team win; Yellow = draw; Red = away team win.

==== Torneo Clausura ====
| Pos | Team | Pld | W | D | L | GF | GA | GD | Pts |
|---|---|---|---|---|---|---|---|---|---|
| 1 | Sporting Cristal | 15 | 10 | 3 | 2 | 35 | 19 | +16 | 33 |
| 2 | Alianza Lima | 15 | 10 | 3 | 2 | 27 | 11 | +16 | 33 |
| 3 | Unión Comercio | 15 | 9 | 1 | 5 | 24 | 15 | +9 | 28 |

===== Results =====
| Home \ Away | ALI | CIE | IGD | JA | LEÓ | MEL | CAI | RGA | SSM | CRI | SHU | UCO | UCV | USM | UTC | UNI |
|---|---|---|---|---|---|---|---|---|---|---|---|---|---|---|---|---|
| Alianza Lima | | | | | | | | | | | | | | | | |
| Cienciano | | | | | | | | | | | | | | | | |
| Inti Gas | | | | | | | | | | 3–3 | | | | | | |
| Juan Aurich | | | | | | | | | | | | | | | | |
| León de Huánuco | | | | | | | | | | 1–3 | | | | | | |
| Melgar | | | | | | | | | | 1–0 | | | | | | |
| Los Caimanes | | | | | | | | | | 1–1 | | | | | | |
| Real Garcilaso | | | | | | | | | | | | | | | | |
| San Simón | | | | | | | | | | 2–3 | | | | | | |
| Sporting Cristal | 3–2 | 2–0 | | 4–1 | | | | 1–1 | | | | 2–3 | 4–1 | | 3–2 | 3–0 |
| Sport Huancayo | | | | | | | | | | 1–2 | | | | | | |
| Unión Comercio | | | | | | | | | | | | | | | | |
| Universidad César Vallejo | | | | | | | | | | | | | | | | |
| Universidad San Martín | | | | | | | | | | 0–1 | | | | | | |
| UTC | | | | | | | | | | | | | | | | |
| Universitario | | | | | | | | | | | | | | | | |

Updated to match(es) played on February 2014. Source: ADFP - official fixture
Legend: Blue = home team win; Yellow = draw; Red = away team win.

==== Finals ====
| Juan Aurich | 2-2 | Sporting Cristal |

| Sporting Cristal | 0-0 | Juan Aurich |

| Sporting Cristal | 3-2 | Juan Aurich |

=== Copa Libertadores ===
==== First stage ====
| 29 January 2014 1 | Sporting Cristal (Peru) | 2 – 1 | (Brazil) Atlético Paranaense | Lima, Peru |
| 19:00 UTC−5 | | Report | | Stadium: Estadio Nacional |

| 5 February 2014 2 | Atlético Paranaense (Brazil) | 2 – 1 (5 – 4 p) | (Peru) Sporting Cristal | Curitiba, Paraná (state), Brazil |
| 22:00 UTC−2 | | Report | | Stadium: Arena da Baixada |

Last updated: 7 January 2014
Source:Matches

== See also ==
- Club Sporting Cristal
- 2014 Torneo Descentralizado
