= 2015 Sporting Cristal season =

Sporting Cristal
2015 season
- President: Federico Cúneo
- Coach: Daniel Ahmed
- Stadium: Alberto Gallardo, Lima
- Torneo Descentralizado: Torneo Apertura: First (1°) Champion; Torneo Clausura: Fifth (5°); Aggregate Table: Third (3°); Final National: Runner-up; Runner-up National (2°)
- Torneo del Inca: Group stage (Second (2°) Group A)
- Copa Libertadores: Second stage
- Top goalscorer: League: All: Carlos Lobatón (16)
Home colours	Away colours	Third colours

The 2015 Sporting Cristal season were the Sixtieth (60.º) of the club from its foundation in 1955, Sixty (60) participations consecutives in the top-flight of Peruvian Primera División (of 99 Editions) with denomination Torneo Descentralizado. In Previous Season the club qualified as Champions National 1st Place of the 2014 Torneo Descentralizado.

Sporting Cristal were a of seventeen (17) clubs in the Fiftieth edition (50.º) Torneo Descentralizado, the competition most important of the Peruvian football. The club played the Peruvian Primera División and Copa Libertadores for third consecutive year and for Thirty-First (31st) Time.

== Players ==
Note: Flags indicate national team as defined under FIFA eligibility rules; some limited exceptions apply. Players may hold more than one non-FIFA nationality.

No.	Pos.	Nation	Player
1	GK	PER	Diego Penny
2	DF	PER	Alberto Rodríguez
3	DF	PER	Luis Rivas
4	DF	PER	Adán Balbín
5	MF	PER	Pedro Aquino
7	MF	ARG	Horacio Calcaterra
9	FW	URU	César Pereyra
10	MF	PER	Renzo Sheput
11	FW	PER	Irven Ávila
12	GK	PER	Luis Araujo
13	DF	PER	Renzo Revoredo
15	DF	PER	Alexis Cossio

No.	Pos.	Nation	Player
16	FW	PER	Alexander Succar
17	MF	ARG	Diego Manicero
19	FW	PER	Joazinho Arroé
20	FW	URU	Sergio Blanco
21	MF	PER	Josepmir Ballón
22	DF	ARG	Matías Martínez
23	MF	URU	Jorge Cazulo
25	DF	PER	Paolo de La Haza
27	MF	PER	Carlos Lobatón (Captain)
29	DF	PER	Luis Abram
30	FW	PER	Luis Da Silva

== Competitions ==
=== Overall ===
Competition	Started round	Final position / round	First match	Last match
Torneo Descentralizado	Torneo del Inca	Runner-up	Feb 7	Dec 16
Copa Libertadores	Second stage	Second stage	Feb 18	Apr 14

=== Torneo Descentralizado ===
==== Torneo del Inca ====
Pos	Team	Pld	W	D	L	GF	GA	GD	Pts
1	Universidad San Martín	10	6	1	3	12	7	+5	19
2	Sporting Cristal	10	6	0	4	15	11	+4	18
3	Melgar	10	6	0	4	14	15	−1	18

==== Torneo Apertura ====
Pos	Team	Pld	W	D	L	GF	GA	GD	Pts	Qualification
1	Sporting Cristal	16	9	4	3	25	16	+9	31	Advance to playoffs
2	Melgar	16	8	6	2	22	11	+11	30	
3	Deportivo Municipal	16	7	7	2	19	13	+6	28	

===== Results =====
Home \ Away	AAS	ALI	CIE	MUN	AYA	JA	LEÓ	MEL	RGA	CRI	SHU	LOR	UCO	UCV	USM	UTC	UNI
Alianza Atlético										1–1							
Alianza Lima																	
Cienciano																	
Deportivo Municipal										1–0							
Ayacucho										1–2							
Juan Aurich										1–2							
León de Huánuco										1–2							
Melgar										0–0							
Real Garcilaso										0–4							
Sporting Cristal		1–3	3–2								1–0	2–1	1–1	1–2	2–0	3–2	
Sport Huancayo																	
Sport Loreto																	
Unión Comercio																	
Universidad César Vallejo																	
Universidad San Martín																	
UTC																	
Universitario										0–0							

Updated to match(es) played on February 2015. Source: ADFP - official fixture
Legend: Blue = home team win; Yellow = draw; Red = away team win.

==== Torneo Clausura ====
Pos	Team	Pld	W	D	L	GF	GA	GD	Pts
4	Universitario	16	8	4	4	26	20	+6	28
5	Sporting Cristal	16	7	6	3	35	24	+11	27
6	Universidad César Vallejo	16	8	3	5	18	20	−2	27

===== Results =====
Home \ Away	AAS	ALI	CIE	MUN	AYA	JA	LEÓ	MEL	RGA	CRI	SHU	LOR	UCO	UCV	USM	UTC	UNI
Alianza Atlético																	
Alianza Lima										2–0							
Cienciano										2–2							
Deportivo Municipal																	
Ayacucho																	
Juan Aurich																	
León de Huánuco																	
Melgar																	
Real Garcilaso																	
Sporting Cristal	4–1			2–2	4–0	3–2	1–1	2–2	0–0								1–2
Sport Huancayo										5–3							
Sport Loreto										2–2							
Unión Comercio										1–4							
Universidad César Vallejo										0–2							
Universidad San Martín										0–2							
UTC										2–3							
Universitario																	

Updated to match(es) played on February 2015. Source: ADFP - official fixture
Legend: Blue = home team win; Yellow = draw; Red = away team win.

==== Semi-finals ====
December 6, 2015 First Leg	Sporting Cristal	3–1	Universidad César Vallejo	Alberto Gallardo, Lima
15:30	Revoredo 26' 54'; Luiz da Silva 87'		24' Chávez	Attendance: 7,018; Referee: Luis Seminario

December 9, 2015 Second Leg	Universidad César Vallejo	4–3	Sporting Cristal	Mansiche, Trujillo
13:00	Millán 12' 79'; Ciucci 34'; Silva 88'		31' (o.g.) Cardoza; 47' Ávila; 51' Luiz da Silva	Attendance: 9,284; Referee: Manuel Garay

==== Finals ====
December 13, 2015 First Leg	Sporting Cristal	2–2	Melgar	Nacional, Lima
15:30	Quina 43' (o.g.); Sheput 52' (pen.)		40' Uribe; 87' Quina	Attendance: 21,955; Referee: Diego Haro

December 16, 2015 Second Leg	Melgar	3–2	Sporting Cristal	Virgen de Chapi, Arequipa
15:30	Zúñiga 22'; Fernández (44.); Cuesta 90'		16' Da Silva; 71' (pen.) Blanco	Attendance: 35,565; Referee: Luis Garay

=== Copa Libertadores ===
==== Second Stage ====
Pos	Team	Pld	W	D	L	GF	GA	GD	Pts
1	Racing	6	4	0	2	15	7	+8	12
2	Guaraní	6	2	3	1	12	10	+2	9
3	Sporting Cristal	6	1	4	1	6	7	−1	7
4	Deportivo Táchira	6	0	3	3	6	15	−9	3

February 18, 2015	Guaraní (Paraguay)	2–2	(Peru) Sporting Cristal	Estadio Defensores del Chaco, Asunción
18:45 UTC−3	Fernández 69'; Santander 84'	Report	Pereyra 31'; Ballón 47'	Referee: Péricles Cortez (Brazil)

February 24, 2015	Sporting Cristal (Peru)	1–1	(Venezuela) Deportivo Táchira	Estadio Nacional, Lima
21:30 UTC−5	Lobatón 26'	Report	González 87'	Referee: Imer Machado (Colombia)

March 10, 2015	Racing (Argentina)	1–2	(Peru) Sporting Cristal	El Cilindro, Avellaneda
21:45 UTC−3	Fernández 66'	Report	Lobatón 58', 80' (pen.)	Referee: Roddy Zambrano (Ecuador)

March 17, 2015	Sporting Cristal (Peru)	0–2	(Argentina) Racing	Estadio Nacional, Lima
18:00 UTC−5		Report	Milito 76' (pen.); Videla 88'	Referee: Daniel Fedorczuk (Uruguay)

April 8, 2015	Deportivo Táchira (Venezuela)	0–0	(Peru) Sporting Cristal	Estadio Polideportivo de Pueblo Nuevo, San Cristóbal
18:15 UTC−4:30		Report		Referee: Raúl Orosco (Bolivia)

April 14, 2015	Sporting Cristal (Peru)	1–1	(Paraguay) Guaraní	Estadio Nacional, Lima
19:15 UTC−5	Blanco 58'	Report	Santander 13'	Referee: Julio Bascuñán (Chile)

== See also ==
- Club Sporting Cristal
- 2015 Torneo Descentralizado
