= Pedro Aquino =

Peruvian footballer (born 1995)

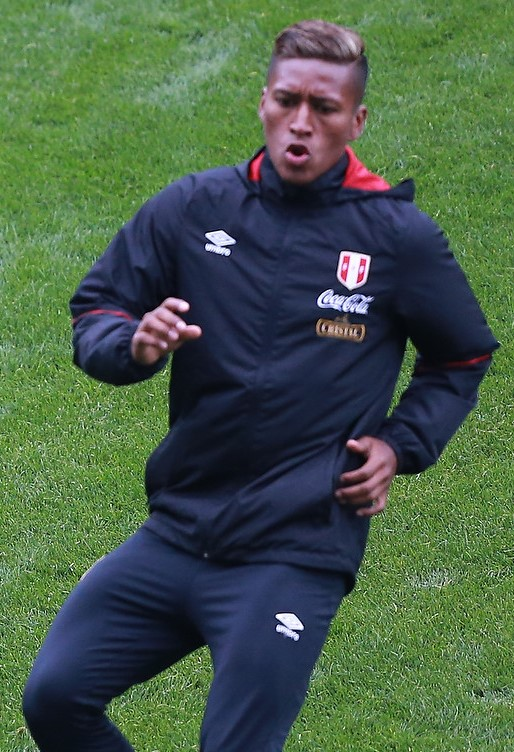
- Aquino with Peru at the 2018 FIFA World Cup

Personal information
- Full name: Pedro Jesús Aquino Sánchez
- Date of birth: 13 April 1995 (age 31)
- Place of birth: Lima, Peru
- Height: 1.75 m (5 ft 9 in)
- Position: Defensive midfielder

Youth career
- 2002–2013: Sporting Cristal

Senior career*
Years	Team	Apps	(Gls)
2013–2017	Sporting Cristal	70	(2)
2017–2018	Monterrey	0	(0)
2017–2018	→ Lobos BUAP (loan)	28	(0)
2018–2020	León	50	(2)
2020–2023	América	73	(3)
2023–2026	Santos Laguna	38	(1)
2025–2026	Alianza Lima (loan)	12	(2)

International career^{‡}
2011	Peru U17	2	(0)
2011	Peru U18	3	(0)
2014–2015	Peru U20	12	(1)
2015	Peru U22	2	(0)
2016–	Peru	49	(3)
- * Club domestic league appearances and goals as of 29 December 2025 ‡ National team caps and goals as of 23:38, 15 December 2025 (UTC)

Pedro Jesús Aquino Sánchez (born 13 April 1995) is a Peruvian professional footballer who plays as a defensive midfielder for Santos Laguna and the Peru national team.

== Club career ==
=== Sporting Cristal ===
He made his senior league debut for Sporting Cristal on 2 June 2013 in a Peruvian Primera División 0–2 away loss at Cienciano.

=== Monterrey ===
On 29 May 2017, Aquino signed for Liga MX club Monterrey, with the club buying 80% of the player's rights.

==== Lobos BUAP (loan) ====
On 8 June 2017, Aquino joined Lobos BUAP on loan, alongside his compatriot Luis Advíncula from Tigres UANL. On 22 July 2017 Aquino made his Liga MX debut against Santos Laguna playing 76 minutes in a 2–2 draw.

=== León ===
On 24 May 2018, he signed for Léon. He made his debut on 21 July 2018, in a 2–0 defeat against Tigres UANL.

=== América ===
On 1 January 2021, Aquino signed for Liga MX side América on a permanent deal from León. Aquino was a regular player for America during his time there.

=== Santos Laguna ===
On 12 June 2023, Aquino joined Santos Laguna.

==== Loan to Alianza Lima ====
On 19 August 2025, Aquino joined Alianza Lima on a one-year loan.

== International career ==
He made his debut for the senior national team on 1 September 2016 in a 0–2 loss to Bolivia in the 2018 World Cup qualifying round.

In May 2018, he was named in Peru’s provisional 24 man squad for the 2018 World Cup in Russia. Aquino started Peru’s second match of the World Cup against France, playing well and hitting the crossbar with a powerful, curving shot from long distance.

== Career statistics ==
=== Club ===
As of 25 August 2025

Appearances and goals by club, season and competition
Club	Season	League			National Cup		Continental		Other		Total	
Club	Season	Division	Apps	Goals	Apps	Goals	Apps	Goals	Apps	Goals	Apps	Goals
Sporting Cristal	2013	Peruvian Primera División	1	0	0	0	—		—		1	0
Sporting Cristal	2014	Peruvian Primera División	15	0	6	0	1 (Note: Appearances in Copa Libertadores)	0	—		16	0
Sporting Cristal	2015	Peruvian Primera División	7	0	3	0	—		—		7	0
Sporting Cristal	2016	Peruvian Primera División	40	1	0	0	1	0	—		41	1
Sporting Cristal	2017	Peruvian Primera División	13	1	0	0	6	0	—		19	1
Sporting Cristal	Total		76	2	9	0	8	0	0	0	93	2
Lobos BUAP (loan)	2017–18	Liga MX	28	0	0	0	—		—		28	0
Léon	2018–19	Liga MX	16	2	3	0	—		—		19	2
Léon	2019–20	Liga MX	14	0	0	0	2 (Note: Appearances in CONCACAF Champions League)	0	—		16	0
Léon	2020–21	Liga MX	20	0	0	0	—		—		20	0
Léon	Total		50	2	3	0	2	0	0	0	55	2
Club América	2020–21	Liga MX	15	3	0	0	—		—		15	3
Club América	2021–22	Liga MX	23	0	0	0	6	0	1 (Note: Appearance in MLS All-Star Game)	0	30	0
Club América	2022–23	Liga MX	35	0	0	0	—		—		35	0
Club América	Total		73	3	0	0	6	0	1	0	80	3
Santos Laguna	2023–24	Liga MX	25	1	0	0	—		2 (Note: Appearances in Leagues Cup)	0	27	1
Santos Laguna	2024–25	Liga MX	13	0	0	0	—		0	0	13	0
Santos Laguna	2025–26	Liga MX	0	0	0	0	—		0	0	0	0
Santos Laguna	Total		38	1	0	0	—		2	0	40	1
Alianza Lima	2025	Peruvian Primera División	1	0	—		—		—		1	0
Career total			266	8	12	0	16	0	3	0	297	8

=== International ===
As of 15 December 2025

Peru
Year	Apps	Goals
2016	3	0
2017	7	0
2018	12	3
2019	3	0
2020	4	0
2021	6	0
2022	4	0
2023	6	0
2025	4	0
Total	49	3

==== International goals ====
Scores and results list Peru's goal tally first.

No.	Date	Venue	Opponent	Score	Result	Competition
1.	6 September 2018	Johan Cruyff Arena, Amsterdam, Netherlands	Netherlands	1–0	1–2	Friendly
2.	12 October 2018	Hard Rock Stadium, Miami Gardens, United States	Chile	2–0	3–0	Friendly
3.	12 October 2018	Hard Rock Stadium, Miami Gardens, United States	Chile	3–0	3–0	Friendly

== Honours ==
León

- Liga MX: Guardianes 2020

Individual

- Liga MX All-Star: 2021
