= Víctor Rossel =

Peruvian footballer (born 1985)

Personal information
- Full name: Víctor Alfonso Rossel Del Mar
- Date of birth: 5 November 1985 (age 41)
- Place of birth: Lima, Peru
- Height: 1.79 m (5 ft 10 in)
- Position: Forward

Senior career*
Years	Team	Apps	(Gls)
2003–2005	Sport Boys	78	(18)
2006	Universitario	3	(0)
2006	Coronel Bolognesi	1	(0)
2007	Sport Boys	12	(4)
2007	Cienciano	10	(2)
2008	José Gálvez	2	(0)
2008	Pelotas	0	(0)
2008	Sport Boys	9	(4)
2009	Universidad César Vallejo	4	(0)
2009–2010	Sport Boys	48	(18)
2011	Universidad César Vallejo	21	(6)
2012	Sport Boys	10	(1)
2012	Real Garcilaso	3	(0)
2013	Unión Comercio	40	(21)
2014	Sport Huancayo	31	(11)
2015	UT Cajamarca	30	(17)
2016–2017	Universidad César Vallejo	25	(5)
2017	Juan Aurich	14	(3)
2017	Atlético Venezuela	5	(0)
2018	Ayacucho	31	(11)
2019	Alianza Universidad	5	(0)
2019	Sport Boys	5	(0)
2020	Atlético Grau	2	(0)
2021	Deportivo Coopsol	1	(0)

International career
2007	Peru	2	(0)
- * Club domestic league appearances and goals

Víctor Alfonso Rossel Del Mar (born 5 November 1985) is a Peruvian former professional footballer who played as a forward. Besides Peru, he played in Venezuela.
