= Héctor Sosa =

Paraguayan footballer (born 1979)

Héctor Sosa (born 12 May 1979) is a Paraguayan footballer who is currently a free agent.

== Teams ==
- (Paraguay) Sol de América 1997–2003
- (Paraguay) 12 de Octubre 2004–2006
- (Argentina) Quilmes 2006–2008
- (Paraguay) Rubio Ñu 2009
- (Peru) Alianza Lima 2010
- (Peru) Unión Comercio 2011–2012
