= Tarek Carranza =

Peruvian footballer (born 1992)

Personal information
- Full name: Tarek Brahan Carranza Terry
- Date of birth: 13 February 1992 (age 34)
- Place of birth: Lima, Peru
- Height: 1.80 m (5 ft 11 in)
- Position: Midfielder

Team information
- Current team: Deportivo Binacional

Youth career
- Sporting Cristal

Senior career*
Years	Team	Apps	(Gls)
2010–2012	Sporting Cristal	41	(1)
2013–2014	Juan Aurich	37	(1)
2015	Cienciano	5	(0)
2015	Sport Loreto	9	(0)
2016–2017	Alianza Atlético	72	(6)
2018–2019	Ayacucho	69	(4)
2020	Carlos A. Mannucci	21	(2)
2021-2022	Sport Boys	44	(5)
2023	Carlos A. Mannucci	21	(0)
2024	Sport Huancayo	11	(0)
2024	Unión Comercio	8	(0)
2025	Universidad de San Martín	12	(0)
2025–2026	Santos	8	(0)
2026–	Deportivo Binacional	0	(0)

International career
2011	U-20 Peru		
- * Club domestic league appearances and goals as of 17 March 2026

Tarek Brahan Carranza Terry (born 13 February 1992) is a Peruvian footballer who plays as a midfielder for Deportivo Binacional in the Peruvian Primera División.

== Club career ==
Carranza was promoted to the Sporting Cristal first team in January 2010. He was given his Torneo Descentralizado league debut by manager Víctor Rivera on matchday 7 of the season. He played the entire match in the 1–2 away win over Sport Boys. He finished his debut season with 14 league appearances.

He scored his first league goal on 2 September 2012 in the 3–1 win over Universidad San Martín, scoring the third after receiving an assist from Jorge Cazulo.

== Honours ==
Sporting Cristal

- Torneo Descentralizado: 2012
