= Leonardo Rivero =

Uruguayan footballer (born 1983)

Leonardo Fabián Rivero Bueno (born November 12, 1983, in Paysandú, Uruguay) is a Uruguayan footballer currently playing for Wilstermann.

== Teams ==
- (Uruguay) Paysandú Bella Vista 2003
- (Chile) Deportes Puerto Montt 2004
- (Chile) Deportes Antofagasta 2004
- (Indonesia) Pelita Jaya 2005–2006
- (Uruguay) Atenas de San Carlos 2006–2007
- (Ecuador) Deportivo Quito 2007–2008
- (Uruguay) Cerro Largo 2009
- (Peru) FBC Melgar 2010–2011
- (Peru) Cienciano 2012
- (Argentina) Gimnasia y Esgrima de Jujuy 2013–2014
- (Uruguay) Cerro Largo 2014
- (Bolivia) Wilstermann 2014-2016
