= Jesús Álvarez (footballer, born 1981) =

Peruvian footballer (born 1981)

Personal information
- Full name: Jesús Martín Álvarez Hurtado
- Date of birth: 26 August 1981 (age 45)
- Place of birth: Tacna, Peru
- Height: 1.82 m (6 ft 0 in)
- Position: Centre-back

Senior career*
Years	Team	Apps	(Gls)
2004–2006	Bolognesi	73	(1)
2007	Sporting Cristal	13	(0)
2007–2008	Bolognesi	51	(0)
2009–2011	Juan Aurich	94	(0)
2012	Univ. San Martín	0	(0)
2012–2013	Sporting Cristal	66	(1)
2014–2016	Universidad César Vallejo	14	(0)
2016	Unión Comercio	3	(0)
2017	Sport Boys	0	(0)

International career
2012	Peru	4	(0)

Managerial career
- 2018: Sport Loreto
- 2018–2019: Sport Boys
- * Club domestic league appearances and goals

Jesús Martín Álvarez Hurtado (born 26 August 1981) is a Peruvian football manager and former player. He played as a centre-back.

== Club career ==
Álvarez made his debut in the Torneo Descentralizado in the 2005 Descentralizado season with local club Coronel Bolognesi FC. He scored his first goal in the Descentralizado the following season with Bolognesi in Round 1 of the 2006 season in his club's 3–1 away win over Alianza Atlético, with Álvarez scoring the winning goal in the 9th minute.

In January 2007 Álvarez joined Peruvian club Sporting Cristal. He made his Descentralizado league debut for Cristal on 14 February 2007 in Round 3 (Apertura) away to Sport Boys. Manager Jorge Sampaoli put him in the match for Carlos Lobaton in the 46th minute to secure the 1–0 win for Cristal.

Álvarez retired in March 2017, a day after making his debut for Sport Boys, in match against Brazilian club Chapecoense.

== International career ==
On 17 May 2012, it was announced that Álvarez was included in Sergio Markarián's squad list for the Peru national team's upcoming friendly match against Nigeria.

== Coaching career ==
In June 2018, Álvarez was appointed as manager of Sport Loreto. He left the club on 24 September 2018. On 3 November 2018, he was then appointed as manager of Sport Boys. He was fired on 10 March 2019.
