= Daniel Ahmed =

Argentine footballer and coach

Personal information
- Full name: Daniel Héctor Ahmed
- Date of birth: 22 November 1965 (age 60)
- Place of birth: Buenos Aires, Argentina
- Position: Forward

Senior career*
Years	Team	Apps	(Gls)
1986–1991	San Lorenzo	66	(14)
1992	Cádiz	0	(0)
1992	Toshiba Sapporo		
1993	Cerro Porteño		
1994–1995	Deportes Concepción		

Managerial career
- 2012: Peru U20
- 2013: Panama U17
- 2014–2015: Sporting Cristal
- 2020: Alianza Lima (interim)
- 2023: Atlético Grau
- * Club domestic league appearances and goals

Daniel Héctor Ahmed (born 22 November 1965) is an Argentine football coach and former player who played as a forward.
