= Jonathan Ramírez =

Uruguayan footballer (born 1990)

Personal information
- Full name: Jonathan Alexander Ramírez Silva
- Date of birth: December 18, 1990 (age 35)
- Place of birth: San Gregorio, Tacuarembó, Uruguay
- Height: 1.69 m (5 ft 7 in)
- Position: Forward

Team information
- Current team: Atenas
- Number: 35

Youth career
- –2007: Wanderers de San Gregorio
- 2007–2008: Tacuarembó

Senior career*
Years	Team	Apps	(Gls)
2008–2010	Tacuarembó	39	(7)
2010–2011	River Plate	16	(7)
2011–2012	Vélez Sársfield	25	(1)
2012	→ Nacional (loan)	8	(0)
2012–2013	→ Sporting Cristal (loan)	12	(0)
2014–2016	River Plate	28	(5)
2016–2017	CA Cerro	7	(0)
2017	El Tanque Sisley	10	(2)
2018	Tacuarembó	15	(2)
2019–2020	Sonsonate	27	(4)
	Atenas	2	(0)
- * Club domestic league appearances and goals

Jonathan Alexander Ramírez Silva (born December 18, 1990) is a Uruguayan football player, who plays as a forward for Atenas.

== Career ==
Ramírez started his professional career playing for Tacuarembó in 2008. In July 2010, he joined Montevideo based River Plate, where he played the 2010–11 Uruguayan Primera División season and the 2010 Copa Sudamericana.

In August 2011, Ramírez joined Vélez Sársfield of the Argentine Primera División, that bought 50% of his transfer rights on an undisclosed fee. In July 2012 he was loaned to Nacional.
