= Óscar Vílchez =

Peruvian footballer (born 1986)

Personal information
- Full name: Óscar Christopher Vílchez Soto
- Date of birth: 21 January 1986 (age 40)
- Place of birth: Chiclayo, Peru
- Height: 1.82 m (6 ft 0 in)
- Position: Central midfielder

Youth career
- 1994–2003: Alianza Lima

Senior career*
| Years | Team | Apps | (Gls) |
| 2004–2007 | Alianza Lima | 24 | (2) |
| 2006 | → Sport Ancash (loan) | 9 | (2) |
| 2007 | → Melgar (loan) | 7 | (0) |
| 2009–2011 | Alianza Lima | 48 | (2) |
| 2012 | Sporting Cristal | 28 | (1) |
| 2013–2015 | Juan Aurich | 88 | (11) |
| 2016–2018 | Alianza Lima | 69 | (3) |
| 2019–2021 | Alianza Universidad | 64 | (0) |
| 2022 | FC Carlos Stein | 21 | (0) |

International career
| 2003 | Peru U17 | 3 | (0) |
| 2013–2016 | Peru | 7 | (0) |
- * Club domestic league appearances and goals as of 09:10, 20 May 2020 (UTC)

Óscar Christopher Vílchez Soto (born 21 January 1986) is a Peruvian former professional footballer who played as a central midfielder. He is the younger brother of footballer Walter Vílchez.

== Club career ==
Vílchez was promoted to the first team of Alianza Lima in 2004 by Gustavo Costas, in that year he made his official debut. He scored his first goal in the Descentralizado on 31 July 2005 in the 4–0 home victory against Sport Ancash. In January 2006 he was loaned out to Sport Ancash for the start of the 2006 season. In January 2007 he was loaned out to Arequipa giants FBC Melgar for the first half of the 2007 season. He returned to Alianza in July 2007 and played several matches. At the end of that year, he suffered an injury that left him outside for nearly two years. In July 2009, after having surgery in Mexico and completing his treatment, he was hired once again by Alianza Lima.

== Honours ==
Sporting Cristal

- Torneo Descentralizado: 2012

Alianza Lima

- Torneo Descentralizado: 2003, 2004, 2017
