= Horacio Calcaterra =

Peruvian footballer (born 1989)

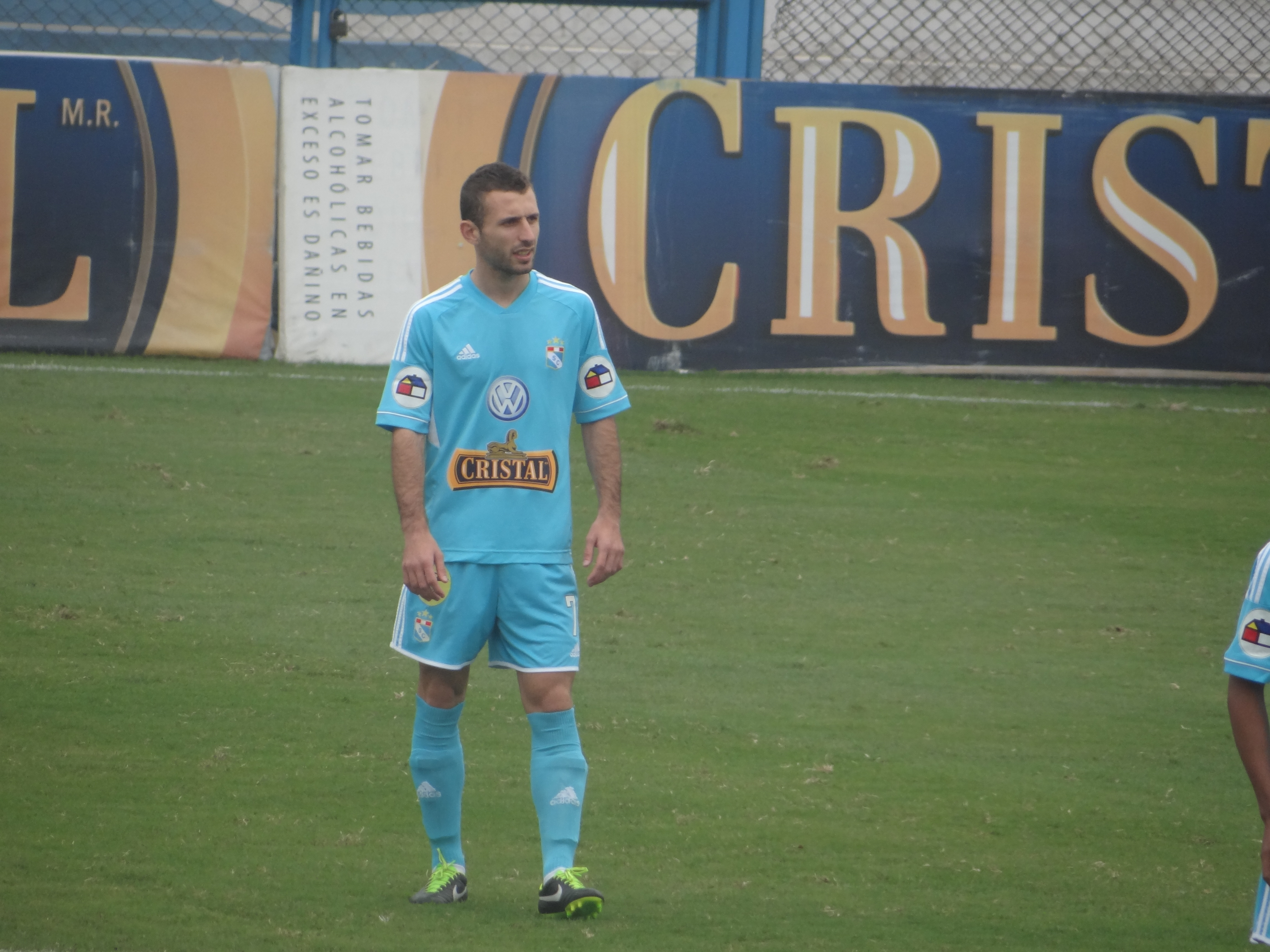
- Calcaterra in 2013

Personal information
- Full name: Horacio Martín Calcaterra
- Date of birth: 22 February 1989 (age 37)
- Place of birth: Santa Fe, Argentina
- Height: 1.76 m (5 ft 9 in)
- Position: Attacking midfielder

Team information
- Current team: Universitario de Deportes
- Number: 10

Senior career*
Years	Team	Apps	(Gls)
2008–2010	Rosario Central	1	(0)
2011	Unión Comercio	26	(4)
2012	Universitario	34	(7)
2013–2022	Sporting Cristal	310	(44)
2023–	Universitario	110	(6)

International career^{‡}
2018–	Peru	10	(0)
- * Club domestic league appearances and goals as of 23:20, 25 August 2025 (UTC) ‡ National team caps and goals as of 16:18, 23 March 2024 (UTC)

Horacio Martín Calcaterra (born 22 February 1989) is a footballer who plays as a midfielder for Peruvian Liga 1 club Universitario de Deportes. Born in Argentina, he plays for the Peru national team.

== Club career ==
Calcaterra began his senior career with Rosario Central in the 2007–08 Argentine Primera División season. In January 2011, he joined the recently promoted Peruvian club Unión Comercio. He made his debut in the first game of the 2011 season in a 4–1 loss against Alianza Lima, in which Calcaterra scored a goal with an assist by Miguel Trauco. There he played under managers Hernán Lisi, who had requested his signing after training him in Rosario Central's reserve team, and later Julio César Uribe. He featured as a regular for Comercio, making 26 appearances with 4 goals during the season and contributing to his team qualifying for the first time to an international competition: the 2012 Copa Sudamericana.

On 20 January 2012, it was announced that Calcaterra had joined Universitario de Deportes. There, he played 34 matches and scored 7 goals. In 2013, he was signed by Sporting Cristal, and there, that same year, he disputed the Copa Libertadores for the first time. In 2014, Cristal won the national league with Calcaterra standing out in the team's midfield along Jorge Cazulo and Carlos Lobatón. In the third leg of that year's finals against Juan Aurich, he scored the 2–2 goal for Cristal, which sent the game into extra time, where a goal by Edinson Chávez would finally win Cristal the game, and thus, the national title. On 15 November 2022, Cristal officially announced Calcaterra's departure after 10 seasons wearing the celeste shirt.

On 23 November 2022, Universitario de Deportes announced his return to the club, with a contract for three seasons. He played his first game in his second spell with Universitario on matchday 3, in a 4–0 victory against Academia Cantolao, and scored his first goal on matchday 11, in a 2–1 victory against Atlético Grau.

== International career ==
Born in Argentina, Calcaterra was naturalised as a Peruvian. He has represented the Peru national team since 2018.

== Career statistics ==
=== International ===
As of match played 29 March 2022

Appearances and goals by national team and year
National team	Year	Apps	Goals
Peru	2018	4	0
Peru	2020	1	0
Peru	2021	1	0
Peru	2022	4	0
Total		10	0

== Honours ==
=== Club ===
Sporting Cristal

- Primera División: Torneo Descentralizado, 2014, 2016, 2018, 2020

Universitario de Deportes

- Peruvian Primera División: 2023, 2024, 2025
