= William Chiroque =

Peruvian footballer (born 1980)

Personal information
- Full name: William Medardo Chiroque Távara
- Date of birth: March 10, 1980 (age 46)
- Place of birth: Chulucanas, Peru
- Height: 1.65 m (5 ft 5 in)
- Positions: Winger; striker

Youth career
- Grau

Senior career*
Years	Team	Apps	(Gls)
1999–2005	Alianza Atlético	148	(22)
2005–2006	Sporting Cristal	19	(1)
2006	Alianza Atlético	15	(0)
2007–2008	Cienciano	74	(5)
2009–2012	Juan Aurich	133	(12)
2013	Sporting Cristal	35	(4)
2014–2015	Universidad César Vallejo	32	(1)
2016	La Bocana	21	(1)
2017	Los Caimanes	8	(1)
2018	Grau	3	(2)
Total		488	(49)

International career^{‡}
2004–2012	Peru	18	(1)
Medal record
Representing Peru
Association football
Copa America
Bronze medal – third place	Argentina 2011
- * Club domestic league appearances and goals as of 24 June 2018 ‡ National team caps and goals as of 20 February 2012

William Medardo Chiroque Távara (born March 10, 1980, in Morropón Province, Peru) is a former Peruvian footballer who plays as a striker or winger . He was part of the Peru squad that won the bronze medal in the 2011 Copa America.

== Playing career ==
=== Club ===
Chiroque began his career at Alianza Atletico of Sullana where he was the team's top scorer, won the 2003 Torneo Clausura and played in the 2004 and 2005 Copa Sudamericana.

=== International ===
Chiroque has been capped thirteen times by the Peru national football team, first on 28 April 2004 in a friendly match against Chile, and scored his first international goal on 23 July 2011 in a 4–1 victory against Venezuela in the 2011 Copa America Third Place Match.

Chiroque was named Man of the Match played between Peru and Chile during the group stage of the 2011 Copa America, on 12 July 2011.

=== International goals ===
Scores and results list Peru's goal tally first.

No	Date	Venue	Opponent	Score	Result	Competition
1.	23 July 2011	Estadio Ciudad de La Plata, La Plata, Argentina	Venezuela	1–0	4–1	2011 Copa América

== Honours ==
=== Club ===
Sporting Cristal

- Clausura: 2005
- Torneo Descentralizado (1): 2005

Juan Aurich

- Torneo Descentralizado (1): 2011

=== Country ===
Peru national team

- Copa America: Bronze medal 2011
