= Deyair Reyes =

Peruvian footballer (born 1992)

Personal information
- Full name: Deyair Reyes Contreras
- Date of birth: 4 March 1992 (age 34)
- Place of birth: Lima, Peru
- Height: 1.67 m (5 ft 6 in)
- Positions: Left back; winger

Team information
- Current team: Cienciano

Senior career*
Years	Team	Apps	(Gls)
2010–2011	Sport Huancayo	17	(1)
2012–2013	Sporting Cristal	10	(0)
2014–2015	Juan Aurich	29	(0)
2016	Unión Comercio	3	(0)
2016	Los Caimanes	22	(1)
2017	Alianza Atlético	7	(0)
2017–2018	Unión Huaral	14	(0)
2019–	Cienciano	0	(0)
- * Club domestic league appearances and goals as of 6 March 2019

Deyair Reyes Contreras (born 4 March 1992) is a Peruvian footballer who plays as a left back or winger for Cienciano in the Peruvian Segunda División.

== Club career ==
Deyair Reyes began his senior career with Sport Huancayo in 2010. However his Torneo Descentralizado league debut came the following season on matchday 1 away to Cienciano. Manager Roberto Mosquera put Reyes in the match in 71st minute but he could not help his side avoid the 1–0 defeat. Reyes scored his first league goal in matchday 4 in the 3–0 home win over Universidad César Vallejo.

In December 2011 Reyes joined Sporting Cristal along with his manager Roberto Mosquera.
