= Nelinho Quina =

Peruvian footballer (born 1987)

Personal information
- Full name: Nelinho Minzún Quina Asín
- Date of birth: 11 May 1987 (age 39)
- Place of birth: Lima, Peru
- Height: 1.80 m (5 ft 11 in)
- Position: Left back

Youth career
- 1992–1997: Academia Cantolao
- 1997–2004: Sporting Cristal

Senior career*
Years	Team	Apps	(Gls)
2005–2006	Sporting Cristal	26	(3)
2006	Univ. César Vallejo	30	(1)
2007–2008	Alianza Atlético	20	(3)
2008–2010	Universitario	35	(0)
2009	→ Westerlo (loan)	13	(0)
2010–2012	Juan Aurich	86	(1)
2013	Sporting Cristal	30	(0)
2014–2015	Melgar	29	(0)
2015–2016	UTC	50	(0)
2017	Unión Comercio	41	(3)
2018	Sport Boys	39	(0)
2019–2022	Universitario	106	(10)
2023	Cusco FC	32	(0)
2024	Carlos A. Mannucci	18	(0)

International career
2007	Peru U-20	2	(0)
- * Club domestic league appearances and goals as of 29 May 2022

Nelinho Minzún Quina Asín (born 11 May 1987) is a Peruvian professional footballer who last played as a left-back for Carlos A. Mannucci in the Torneo Descentralizado. He is the twin brother of Minzum Quina.

== Club career ==
Quina came from the youth ranks of Academia Cantolao, later moving to Sporting Cristal at 10 years of age, where he made his debut in the Torneo Descentralizado in 2005. In his debut season, Quina was part of the team that finished as champions of the 2005 Torneo Descentralizado.

He then moved to César Vallejo in 2006 and to Alianza Atlético in 2007, where he played more on the regular: a total of 26 matches. Halfway through 2008, Quina arrived at Universitario de Deportes, from where, after good performances in the 2009 Copa Libertadores, he was loaned for one season to K.V.C. Westerlo of the Belgian Pro League.

== Honours ==
Sporting Cristal

- Torneo Descentralizado: 2005

Universitario de Deportes

- Torneo Descentralizado: 2009
- Torneo Apertura 2020

Juan Aurich

- Torneo Descentralizado: 2011
