= Diego Penny =

Peruvian footballer (born 1984)

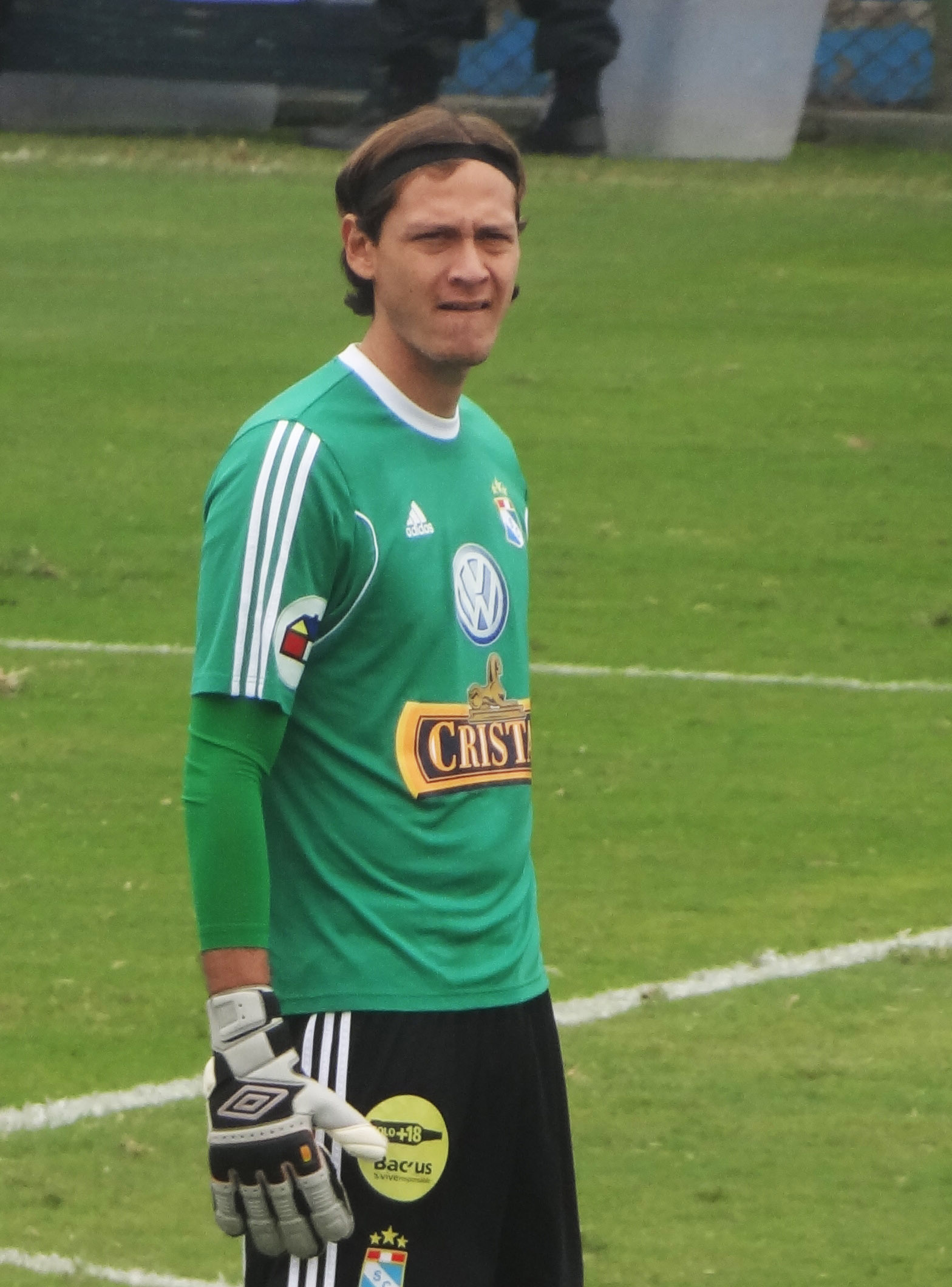

Personal information
- Full name: Diego Alonso Roberto Penny
- Date of birth: 22 April 1984 (age 42)
- Place of birth: Lima, Peru
- Height: 1.97 m (6 ft 6 in)
- Position: Goalkeeper

Senior career*
Years	Team	Apps	(Gls)
2004–2008	Coronel Bolognesi	181	(0)
2008–2010	Burnley	2	(0)
2010–2013	Juan Aurich	77	(0)
2013–2016	Sporting Cristal	130	(0)
2017–2018	Melgar	56	(0)
2019–2021	Universidad San Martín	81	(0)
2022	Alianza Atlético	31	(0)
2023–2024	Deportivo Garcilaso	44	(0)

International career^{‡}
2006–2016	Peru	17	(0)
- * Club domestic league appearances and goals as of 4 April 2024 (UTC) ‡ National team caps and goals as of 07:39, 24 October 2017 (UTC)

Diego Alonso Roberto Penny (born 22 April 1984) is a Peruvian former professional footballer who played as a goalkeeper. He stands at 1.97m tall. He made 17 appearances for the Peru national team.

== Club career ==
=== Early career ===
Penny began his career in 2004 with Peruvian side Coronel Bolognesi, where he played 180 times.

=== Burnley ===
Penny signed a three-year contract for Burnley on 27 June 2008, making his debut on 9 August 2008 in a 4–1 loss against Sheffield Wednesday. After his debut, throughout the 2008–09 season and into his second year with Burnley, he was second-choice to Brian Jensen. Penny made his Premier League debut in the 2009–10 season, after coming on for the injured Jensen in a 3–1 home defeat by Wigan Athletic. On 16 August 2010, he left Burnley by mutual consent and returned to his homeland of Peru. Penny made a total of four appearances for Burnley in all competitions.

=== Juan Aurich ===
He joined Peruvian club Juan Aurich on 28 August 2010.

== International career ==
Penny made his senior international debut for Peru in 2006.

== Honours ==
Burnley

- Football League Championship play-offs: 2009
