= Marcos Delgado =

Peruvian footballer (born 1988)

Personal information
- Full name: Marcos Abner Delgado Ocampo
- Date of birth: 17 February 1988 (age 38)
- Place of birth: Chiclayo, Peru
- Height: 1.83 m (6 ft 0 in)
- Positions: Centre-back; defensive midfielder

Team information
- Current team: Santos de Nasca
- Number: 6

Youth career
- 2006: Sporting Cristal

Senior career*
Years	Team	Apps	(Gls)
2007–2008	Sporting Cristal	25	(0)
2009	Coronel Bolognesi	29	(0)
2010	CNI	10	(1)
2011	Sport Huancayo	26	(1)
2012–2014	Sporting Cristal	38	(3)
2014	→ Real Garcilaso	13	(1)
2015	Juan Aurich	20	(0)
2016	Deportivo Municipal	13	(0)
2017	Alianza Atlético	26	(1)
2018	Sport Huancayo	21	(1)
2019	Ayacucho	12	(1)
2019	Universidad San Martín	16	(0)
2020	Cusco	20	(0)
2021-	Ayacucho	1	(0)
- * Club domestic league appearances and goals as of 14:35, 6 May 2020 (UTC)

Marcos Abner Delgado Ocampo (born 17 February 1988) is a Peruvian professional footballer who plays for Santos de Nasca as a centre-back or defensive midfielder.

== Career ==
Delgado joined Peruvian giants Sporting Cristal in 2006. He was promoted to the first team the following season.

Then later Delgado made his Torneo Descentralizado league debut on 26 August 2007 in an away match against Coronel Bolognesi. Manager Juan Carlos Oblitas put him in the 73rd minute to help wrap up the 0–1 win for Cristal.< The following week he played his first match as a starter playing alongside Rainer Torres in the midfield in the 1–1 draw at home against Melgar. He finished his debut season with 14 league appearances.

He then had a season long spell with Coronel Bolognesi, joining the Tacna club in January 2009. That season he played under the management of Roberto Mosquera for his first time.

He often partnered Erick Rojas in the midfield and made 29 league appearances for Bolognesi in the 2009 Descentralizado season.

Delgado then joined Colegio Nacional Iquitos in January 2010. There he scored his first league goal of his career on matchday 2 in the 3–1 home win over Sport Boys. He finished the 2010 season with ten league appearances and one goal.

== Honours ==
Sporting Cristal

- Torneo Descentralizado: 2012
