= Carlos Lobatón =

Peruvian footballer (born 1980)

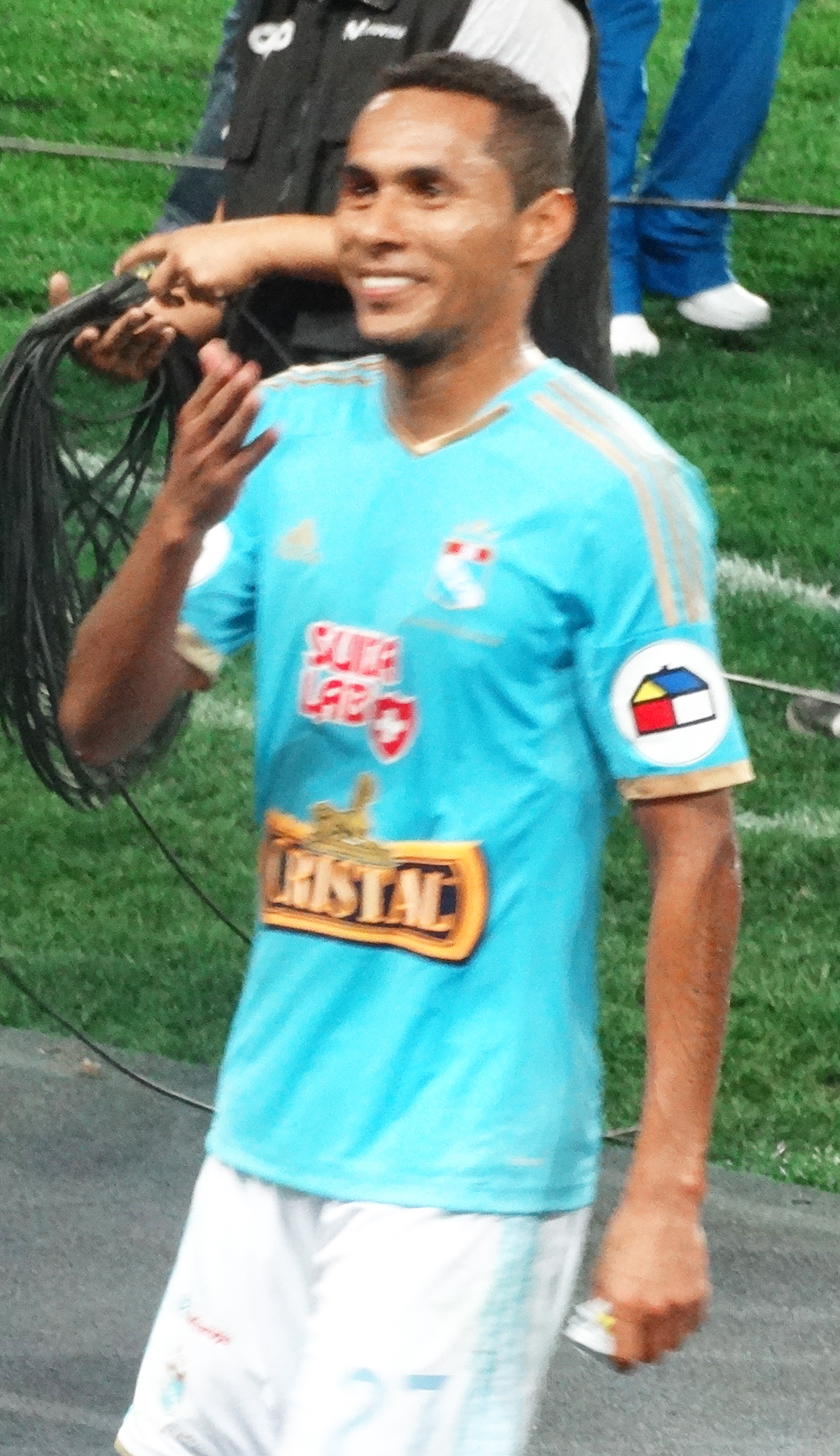

Personal information
- Full name: Carlos Augusto Lobatón Espejo
- Date of birth: February 6, 1980 (age 46)
- Place of birth: Barranquilla, Colombia
- Height: 1.75 m (5 ft 9 in)
- Position: Midfielder

Team information
- Current team: Sporting Cristal (management)

Youth career
- 1987–1992: Academia Cantolao
- 1997–1999: Sporting Cristal

Senior career*
Years	Team	Apps	(Gls)
2000–2001	Sport Boys	53	(8)
2002	Estudiantes de Medicina	13	(4)
2002	Universitario de Deportes	9	(2)
2003	Unión Huaral	17	(1)
2003–2005	Cienciano	63	(12)
2005–2019	Sporting Cristal	482	(98)
Total		634	(125)

International career
2005–2016	Peru	49	(1)
Medal record
Representing Peru
Association football
Copa America
Bronze medal – third place	Argentina 2011
Bronze medal – third place	Chile 2015
Cienciano
Winner	Copa Sudamericana	2003
Winner	Recopa Sudamericana	2004
Sporting Cristal
Winner	Peruvian League	2005
- * Club domestic league appearances and goals

Carlos Augusto Lobatón Espejo (born February 6, 1980) is a Peruvian former professional footballer who played as a midfielder.

== Club career ==
Lobatón was born in Barranquilla, Colombia. He first developed as footballer in the popular Academia Cantolao along with his brother Abel Lobatón, at the age of 7. There he had as his first coach Víctor "El Chino" Rivera. Lobatón later joined the renowned youth system of Sporting Cristal. At the age of 18, he was loaned to Sport Boys. In 1998, he made his professional debut wearing their famous pink jersey. Later he played for various clubs in the Peruvian league until arriving at Cienciano. There he would find both national and international success. In 2003, he helped Cienciano win the Copa Sudamericana beating River Plate in the final. In the following year he also won the Recopa Sudamericana this time defeating Boca Juniors. Then in 2005 he won the Peruvian Torneo Apertura with Cienciano. Later in the second half of the 2005 season he returned to Sporting Cristal and helped them win the 2005 Torneo Clausura. In 2007, he suffered burns on the soles of his feet after playing on artificial turf or artificial pitch in the blazing sun.

In the last years, Carlos Lobatón has been an emblatic player in Sporting Cristal. He has played in the club for the last 10 years, winning the national championship four times (2005, 2012, 2014, 2016) and scoring amazing goals.

Lobatón retired from football at the end of 2019.

== International career ==
In 2005 Lobatón made his first national team appearance for Peru. Throughout much of his international career his appearances were sporadic. However on November 12, 2010, after a three year absence, the new Peruvian national team coach Sergio Markarián called him up to play in a friendly against Colombia. He started in the 1–1 draw versus Colombia, which was Peru's final game of 2010. On June 29, 2011, current coach Sergio Markarián included Lobatón in his squad to participate in the 2011 Copa America. On July 16, 2011, in the quarterfinal match of the Copa America versus Colombia, he scored the winning goal in extra time that sent Peru to the semifinals.

== Post-playing career ==
After his retirement, Lobatón was hired in the management of his last club Sporting Cristal.

== Career statistics ==
As of 17 April 2017

Appearances and goals by club, season and competition
Club	Season	League			National cup (Note: Includes Copa Inca.)		South America (Note: Includes Copa Libertadores, Copa Sudamericana.)		Total	
Club	Season	Division	Apps	Goals	Apps	Goals	Apps	Goals	Apps	Goals
Sport Boys	1998	Torneo Descentralizado			–		–			
Sport Boys	1999	Torneo Descentralizado			–		–			
Sport Boys	2000	Torneo Descentralizado	24	5	–		–		24	5
Sport Boys	2001	Torneo Descentralizado	29	3	–		–		29	3
Sport Boys	Total		53	8	0	0	0	0	53	8
Estudiantes de Medicina	2002	Torneo Descentralizado	13	4	–		–		13	4
Universitario	2002	Torneo Descentralizado	9	2	–		–		9	2
Unión Huaral	2003	Torneo Descentralizado	17	1	–		–		17	1
Cienciano	2003	Torneo Descentralizado	10	2	–		1	0	11	2
Cienciano	2004	Torneo Descentralizado	40	10	–		10	3	50	13
Cienciano	2005	Torneo Descentralizado	13	0	–		2	1	15	1
Cienciano	Total		63	12	0	0	13	4	76	16
Sporting Cristal	2005	Torneo Descentralizado	18	2	–		–		18	2
Sporting Cristal	2006	Torneo Descentralizado	32	5	–		3	0	35	5
Sporting Cristal	2007	Torneo Descentralizado	35	5	–		2	0	37	5
Sporting Cristal	2008	Torneo Descentralizado	47	13	–		–		47	13
Sporting Cristal	2009	Torneo Descentralizado	40	8	–		2	0	42	8
Sporting Cristal	2010	Torneo Descentralizado	34	3	–		–		34	3
Sporting Cristal	2011	Peruvian Primera División	25	2	0	0	–		25	2
Sporting Cristal	2012	Peruvian Primera División	35	5	–		–		35	5
Sporting Cristal	2013	Peruvian Primera División	32	6	–		6	3	38	9
Sporting Cristal	2014	Peruvian Primera División	43	19	–		2	1	45	20
Sporting Cristal	2015	Torneo Descentralizado	25	13	–		5	3	30	16
Sporting Cristal	2016	Torneo Descentralizado	27	9	–		6	0	33	9
Sporting Cristal	Total		393	90	0	0	26	7	419	97
Career total			548	117	0	0	39	11	587	128
