= Junior Ross =

Peruvian footballer (born 1986)

Júnior Ross
Personal information
- Full name: Douglas Júnior Ross Santillana
- Date of birth: 19 February 1986 (age 40)
- Place of birth: Bellavista, Callao, Peru
- Height: 1.78 m (5 ft 10 in)
- Position: Winger

Team information
- Current team: Walter Ormeño de Cañete

Youth career
- –2004: Coronel Bolognesi

Senior career*
Years	Team	Apps	(Gls)
2004–2010	Coronel Bolognesi	166	(48)
2006	→ Cienciano (loan)	15	(4)
2007	→ Alianza Lima (loan)	16	(2)
2009–2010	→ FSV Frankfurt (loan)	24	(1)
2010	Juan Aurich	0	(0)
2011	Arka Gdynia	4	(0)
2011–2014	Sporting Cristal	81	(22)
2015–2016	Juan Aurich	21	(0)
2016–2017	Sport Huancayo	28	(3)
2017	UCV	22	(10)
2018	Cienciano	31	(4)
2019	Sport Boys	27	(3)
2020	Deportivo Municipal	23	(0)
2021–2022	Comerciantes Unidos	0	(0)
2022	Alfonso Ugarte de Puno	16	(2)
2022–2023	Juan Aurich		
2023–	Walter Ormeño de Cañete		

International career
2005–2013	Peru	10	(0)
- * Club domestic league appearances and goals as of 19 February 2024

Douglas Júnior Ross Santillana (born 19 February 1986), commonly known as Júnior Ross, is a Peruvian footballer who plays as a winger for Walter Ormeño de Cañete.

== Club career ==
Ross made his debut at the beginning of the 2004 season with Coronel Bolognesi, in the Torneo Descentralizado. After two years he was loaned out to Cienciano del Cuzco. There he played 15 games and scored four goals, than returned to Bolognesi. In January 2007, he moved to the Capital City to join Alianza Lima on loan. There he played 16 games and scored two goals, before returning Bolognesi in January 2008.

He finished as the Clausura Champion for the second half of the 2007 season with Coronel Bolognesi. He also played in the Copa Libertadores and Copa Sudamericana.

On 2 February 2009, he was signed by German 2. Bundesliga side FSV Frankfurt on a loan deal until the end of the season. Moreover, Werder Bremen has a signing option on him for summer 2009. Neither FSV Frankfurt nor Werder Bremen claimed the signing option so Ross went back to Coronel Bolognesi. On 19 December 2010, he signed a half-year contract with Arka Gdynia.

== International career ==
Ross has made 10 appearances for the senior Peru national football team.

== Honours ==
Coronel Bolognesi

- Clausura: 2007

Sporting Cristal

- Torneo Descentralizado: 2012, 2014
