= Marcio Valverde =

Peruvian footballer (born 1987)

Personal information
- Full name: Marcio André Valverde Zamora
- Date of birth: October 23, 1987 (age 39)
- Place of birth: Bellavista, Peru
- Height: 1.74 m (5 ft 9 in)
- Positions: Right winger; right back

Team information
- Current team: Sport Huancayo

Youth career
- Cantolao
- Sport Boys
- 2002–2004: Unión Minas

Senior career*
Years	Team	Apps	(Gls)
2008–2009	Alianza Atlético	76	(10)
2010–2013	Sporting Cristal	89	(6)
2014	UT Cajamarca	24	(2)
2015–2017	Real Garcilaso	105	(19)
2018–	Sport Huancayo	4	(0)

International career
2009	Peru	2	(0)
- * Club domestic league appearances and goals as of 26 February 2018

Marcio André Valverde Zamora (born 23 October 1987) is a Peruvian professional footballer who plays for Liga 1 club Sport Huancayo.

== Club career ==
Valverde made his professional debut in the Torneo Descentralizado on 30 July 2008 with Alianza Atlético against Sport Áncash. He participated in the 2009 Copa Sudamericana, finishing the tournament with 3 goals.

On 18 December 2009 Valverde joined one of the most popular clubs in Peru, Sporting Cristal. He signed a two-year contract.

== International career ==
On 14 October 2009 he made his national team debut for Peru in a World cup qualifier game against Bolivia, which finished in a 1–0 victory for Peru. He came on late in the game for Amilton Prado.

On 14 November 2009 Valverde played his second game for his national team, which was a friendly match against Honduras in Miami. He started and was substituted in the 46th minute for Aldo Corzo. The game finished 2–1 in favor of Peru.

== Honours ==
=== Club ===
Sporting Cristal

- Torneo Descentralizado: 2012
