= Joazhiño Arroe =

Peruvian footballer (born 1992)

Personal information
- Full name: Joazhiño Walhir Arroe Salcedo
- Date of birth: 5 June 1992 (age 34)
- Place of birth: Callao, Peru
- Height: 1.76 m (5 ft 9 in)
- Positions: Winger; striker

Team information
- Current team: USMP

Youth career
- –2007: Sporting Cristal
- 2007–2009: Siena

Senior career*
Years	Team	Apps	(Gls)
2009–2012	Siena	1	(0)
2011–2012	→ Alianza Lima (loan)	15	(2)
2012	Braga B	0	(0)
2013–2015	Sporting Cristal	24	(5)
2016	USMP	5	(0)
2017	Real Garcilaso	19	(5)
2018	Sport Boys	24	(3)
2019–2021	Alianza Lima	46	(8)
2021	Sport Huancayo	11	(0)
2021–2022	Carlos A. Mannucci	30	(2)
2022–2024	Unión Comercio	15	(0)
2024–2025	USMP	18	(4)
2025–2026	Deportivo Coopsol	18	(2)
2026–	USMP	0	(0)

International career
2007	Peru U15	4	(0)
2009	Peru U17	4	(0)
2010–2011	Peru U20	3	(0)
- * Club domestic league appearances and goals as of 8 March 2020

Joazhiño Walhir Arroe Salcedo (born 5 June 1992) is a Peruvian professional footballer who plays as a winger or striker for Liga 2 club USMP. Arroe made his professional debut in 2009–10 Coppa Italia.

== Club career ==
Arroe made his first team debut in November 2009, against Grosseto as a last minute substitute. The Cup match ended with Siena defeating Grosseto 2–0. He arrived in Italy in June 2007, at the age of 15. Although below the minimum age of international transfer, which required the player to be aged 18 or above (except within EEA, which is 16 with additional requirements), his agent Fabián Soldini let him travel with his family for reasons other than football to fulfil the FIFA regulations, like Soldini brought Lionel Messi to Spain for medical treatment and education.

Despite Siena getting relegated to Serie B for the 2010–11 season, he remained with the club's Primavera team, which was eliminated in the quarter-final stage of the 2011 Torneo di Viareggio. and the first round (round of 32) of 2010–11 Coppa Italia Primavera.

Since Siena achieved promotion back to Serie A, it was announced on 29 August 2011 that Arroe would join Peruvian club Alianza Lima on loan for the 2011–12 season so that he could gain first team experience. He joined Alianza Lima during the final part of the 2011 Descentralizado season. Arroe made his Peruvian First Division debut on 22 October 2011 in round 25 away to Colegio Nacional Iquitos. He entered the match in 85th minute, and the match finished in a 1–0 win for Alianza Lima.

On 31 August, he signed for SC Braga to play in the second team.

== International career ==
Arroe was a regular in youth international football tournaments. He received a call-up to 2007 South American Under-15 Football Championship (played all 4 matches), 2009 South American Under-17 Football Championship (played all 4 matches) and 2011 South American Youth Championship. He also received several call-up for friendlies and training sessions for the South American Youth Cup.

At the South American Youth Cup, he wore the number 9 shirt but only made 2 substitute appearances and started the last match of the group stage. Peru failed to advance to the next stage.

== Career statistics ==
As of 8 October 2023

Appearances and goals by club, season and competition
Club	Season	League		Cup		Continental		Total	
Club	Season	Apps	Goals	Apps	Goals	Apps	Goals	Apps	Goals
Siena	2009–10	0	0	1	0	—		1	0
Siena	2010–11	1	0	—		—		1	0
Siena	Total	1	0	1	0	0	0	2	0
Alianza Lima	2011	8	2	—		—		8	2
Alianza Lima	2012	16	1	—		5	1	21	2
Alianza Lima	Total	24	3	0	0	5	1	29	4
Sporting Cristal	2013	16	5	—		4	0	20	5
Sporting Cristal	2015	12	1	0	0	1	0	13	1
Sporting Cristal	Total	28	6	0	0	5	0	33	6
USMP	2016	9	0	—		—		9	0
Real Garcilaso	2017	35	9	—		—		35	9
Sport Boys	2018	32	4	—		—		32	4
Alianza Lima	2019	29	4	3	0	5	0	37	4
Alianza Lima	2020	17	4	—		6	2	23	6
Alianza Lima	Total	46	8	3	0	11	2	69	10
Sport Huancayo	2021	11	0	0	0	5	1	16	1
Carlos A. Mannucci	2022	30	2	0	0	—		30	2
Unión Comercio	2023	15	0	0	0	—		15	0
Career total		231	32	4	0	26	4	261	36
