= Nicolás Ayr =

Argentine footballer (born 1982)

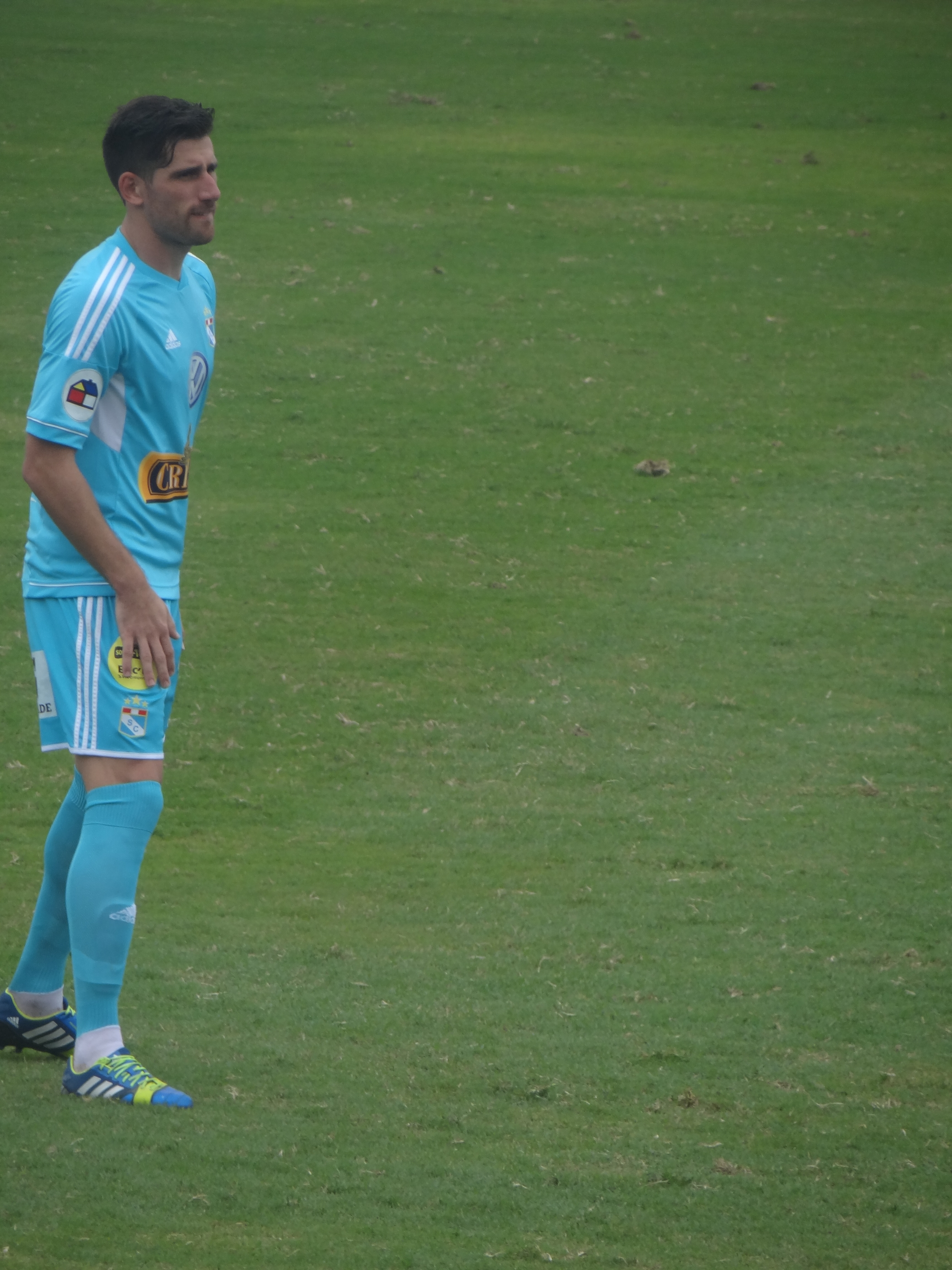
- Nicolás Ayr in 2013

Personal information
- Date of birth: October 11, 1982 (age 44)
- Place of birth: La Plata, Argentina
- Height: 1.86 m (6 ft 1 in)
- Position: Defender

Senior career*
Years	Team	Apps	(Gls)
2001–2003	Estudiantes de La Plata	8	(0)
2004–2006	La Plata Fútbol Club	55	(7)
2004	→ Dorados de Tijuana (loan)	8	(0)
2006	2 de Mayo	9	(1)
2007–2008	Deportes Tolima	17	(0)
2009–2011	Atlético Huila	98	(2)
2012–2013	Sporting Cristal	75	(1)
2014	Aldosivi	13	(0)
2015	Deportivo Cuenca	15	(0)
2015	→ Gimnasia y Esgrima (loan)	1	(0)
2016	Real Garcilaso	20	(0)
2016–2017	Nueva Chicago	24	(0)
2017–2018	Guillermo Brown	15	(0)
2019–2020	Circulo Deportivo Nicanor Otamendi	13	(0)
Medal record
Second place	Copa Libertadores	2013
- * Club domestic league appearances and goals

Nicolás Ayr (born October 11, 1982) is an Argentine footballer who played for clubs in Mexico, Paraguay, Colombia and Peru as well as in his native Argentina.

His nicknamed is La Muralla (English: The Wall)

In 2012, Ayr joined Primera División Peruana side Sporting Cristal from Atlético Huila.

== Honours ==
Sporting Cristal

- Torneo Descentralizado: 2012
