= Renzo Revoredo =

Peruvian footballer

Personal information
- Full name: Renzo Revoredo Zuazo
- Date of birth: 11 May 1986 (age 40)
- Place of birth: Lima, Peru
- Height: 1.77 m (5 ft 10 in)
- Positions: Right-back; centre-back

Senior career*
| Years | Team | Apps | (Gls) |
| 2003–2004 | Sporting Cristal | 7 | (0) |
| 2004–2008 | Bolognesi | 138 | (5) |
| 2009–2012 | Universitario | 59 | (3) |
| 2011 | → Sporting Cristal (loan) | 12 | (0) |
| 2012 | → Olimpia (loan) | 19 | (0) |
| 2012 | Barcelona SC | 2 | (0) |
| 2013–2020 | Sporting Cristal | 219 | (17) |
| 2017 | → Melgar (loan) | 10 | (0) |
| 2021–2022 | Sport Boys | 39 | (1) |
| Total | | 505 | (26) |

International career
| 2010–2016 | Peru | 17 | (0) |
Medal record
Representing Peru
Association football
Copa America
| Bronze medal – third place | Argentina 2011 |
- * Club domestic league appearances and goals as of 20 November 2017

Renzo Revoredo Zuazo (born 11 May 1986) is a Peruvian former professional footballer who played as a right-back or centre-back. He made 17 appearances for the Peru national team.

== Club career ==
=== Early career ===
Revoredo was born in Lima. He made his official debut in the Peruvian First Division on 11 April 2004, for Sporting Cristal in an away match against Deportivo Wanka. The match was for the 7th round of the 2004 Apertura and finished in a 1–1 draw. On the day of his debut Revoredo was 17 years old and played the entire match.

=== Return to Sporting Cristal ===
On 10 August 2011, during the second half of the 2011 season, it was announced that Revoredo left Universitario and signed a one-year and half contract with Sporting Cristal. Revoredo would team up again with Juan Reynoso his coach at Universitario. His first game on his return to Cristal was away to Matute in the Alianza Lima - Sporting Cristal derby. In the derby, Revoredo started alongside center back partner Walter Vilchez and helped Cristal keep a clean-sheet against Alianza, the first placed team in the league at the time.

== International career ==
=== 2011 Copa America ===
Revoredo's performances at club level convinced the Peru national football team coach Sergio Markarián to include him in the squad for the 2011 Copa America.

== Honours ==
Coronel Bolognesi

- Torneo Clausura: 2007

Universitario de Deportes

- Peruvian First Division: 2009

Barcelona SC

- Ecuadorian Serie A: 2012

Peru

- Copa America bronze medal: 2011
