= Irven Ávila =

Peruvian footballer (born 1990)

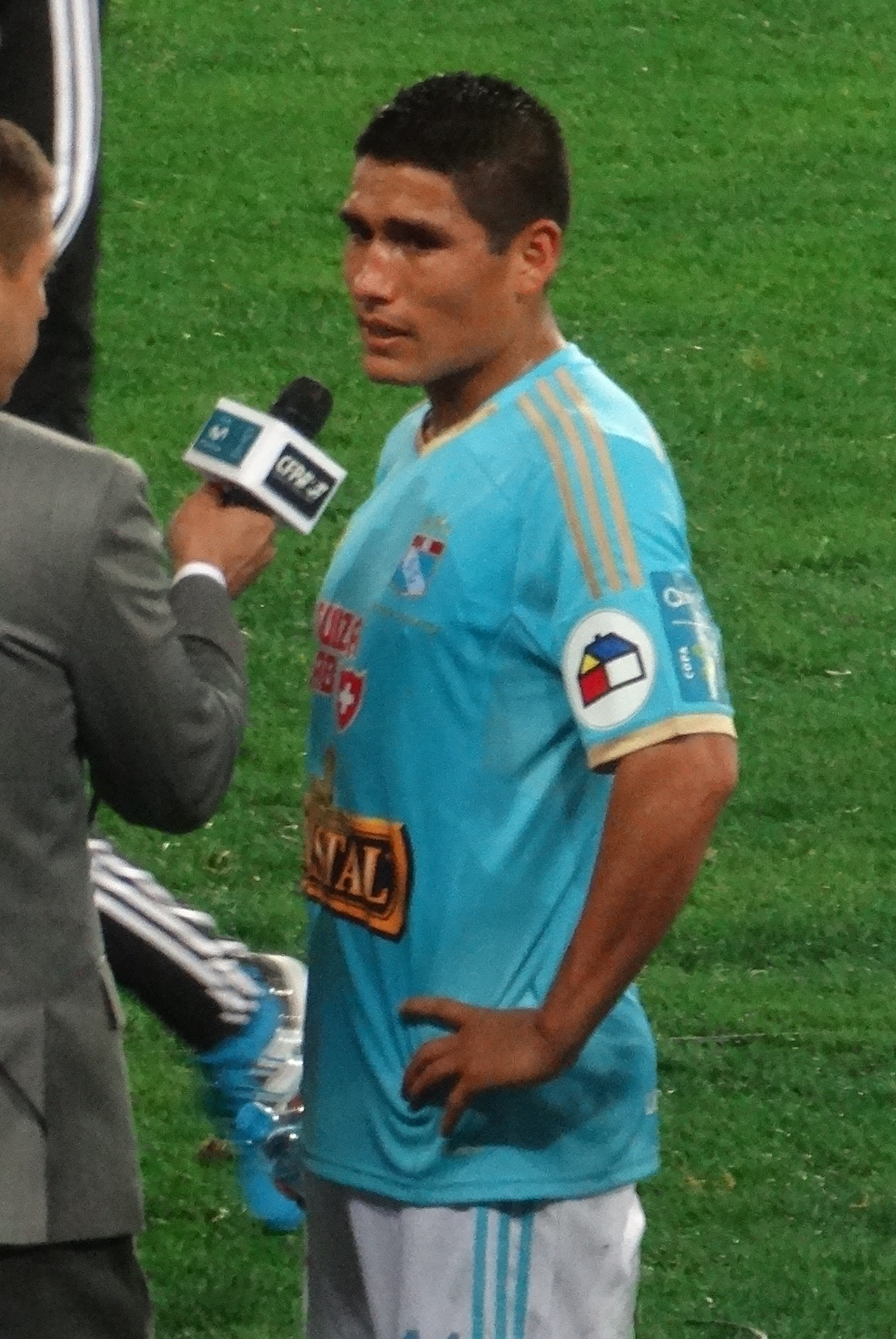
- Ávila in 2014

Personal information
- Full name: Irven Beybe Ávila Acero
- Date of birth: 2 July 1990 (age 36)
- Place of birth: Huánuco, Peru
- Height: 1.70 m (5 ft 7 in)
- Positions: Striker; winger

Team information
- Current team: Sporting Cristal
- Number: 21

Youth career
- 2004: Academia Tito Drago
- 2005–2007: Deportivo Real FC
- 2007–2008: Universitario

Senior career*
Years	Team	Apps	(Gls)
2008–2009	Universitario	7	(0)
2009	→ Sport Huancayo (loan)	38	(13)
2010–2011	Sport Huancayo	71	(30)
2012–2017	Sporting Cristal	221	(92)
2016	→ LDU Quito (loan)	13	(1)
2018–2019	BUAP	11	(1)
2018–2019	→ Morelia (loan)	18	(2)
2019–2020	Melgar	37	(7)
2021–	Sporting Cristal	101	(21)

International career^{‡}
2007	Peru U-17	10	(0)
2009–	Peru	12	(0)
- * Club domestic league appearances and goals as of 4 April 2024 (UTC) ‡ National team caps and goals as of 1 April 2015

Irven Beybe Ávila Acero (born 2 July 1990) is a Peruvian professional footballer who plays as a striker for Sporting Cristal.

== Club career ==
=== Universitario de Deportes ===
Ávila made his Descentralizado league debut while with Universitario de Deportes in the 2008 season on 20 February 2008, at the age of 17. His debut took place in Chimbote against José Gálvez FBC in an away match, which finished 1–0 in favor of Universitario.

=== Sport Huancayo ===
In January 2009 Ávila was loaned out to newly promoted club Sport Huancayo for the start of the 2009 Torneo Descentralizado season in order to gain more first team experience. He made his league debut for Sport Huancayo on 15 February 2009 away to Alianza Lima for Round 1 of the season. Manager José Ramírez Cubas allowed him to start the match from the beginning and was later substituted in the 67th minute, as the match finished 2–1 to Alianza Lima. Five games later, Ávila scored his first professional goal on 22 March 2009 in a league match at home against Cienciano del Cuzco. His goal was scored in the 74th minute and helped secure the 2–0 win for his team.

Before the start of the 2010 season there were rumors linking Irvin back to his parent club, but instead he chose to stay with Sport Huancayo as he was now a regular starter for the Rojo Matador.

Ávila played one of his best matches of the 2011 Torneo Descentralizado season in round 28 away to league leaders, at the time, Alianza Lima. He scored in the 59th minute the second goal in the 2–0 win to Sport Huancayo in Matute.

== International career ==
He played for Peru at the 2007 FIFA U-17 World Cup in the Republic of Korea, and he also played for Peru at the U-20 level.

Ávila made his full senior debut for the Peru national football team on 5 September 2009, in a 2010 World Cup Qualifying match at home against Uruguay, at the age of 19. He was substituted in for Daniel Chavez in the 59th minute. His debut match was played in the Monumental and finished 1–0 in favor of Peru. His second game for Peru was a friendly match against Honduras that was played on 19 November 2009, which finished in a 2–1 win for Peru.

On 28 August 2011, Ávila was called up to the Peru national team by Sergio Markarián to take part in two friendly matches against Bolivia.

== Honours ==
Universitario de Deportes

- Apertura: 2008

Sporting Cristal

- Torneo Descentralizado: 2012
- Torneo Descentralizado: 2014
- Copa Bicentenario: 2021
