= Jorge Cazulo =

Uruguayan footballer (born 1982)

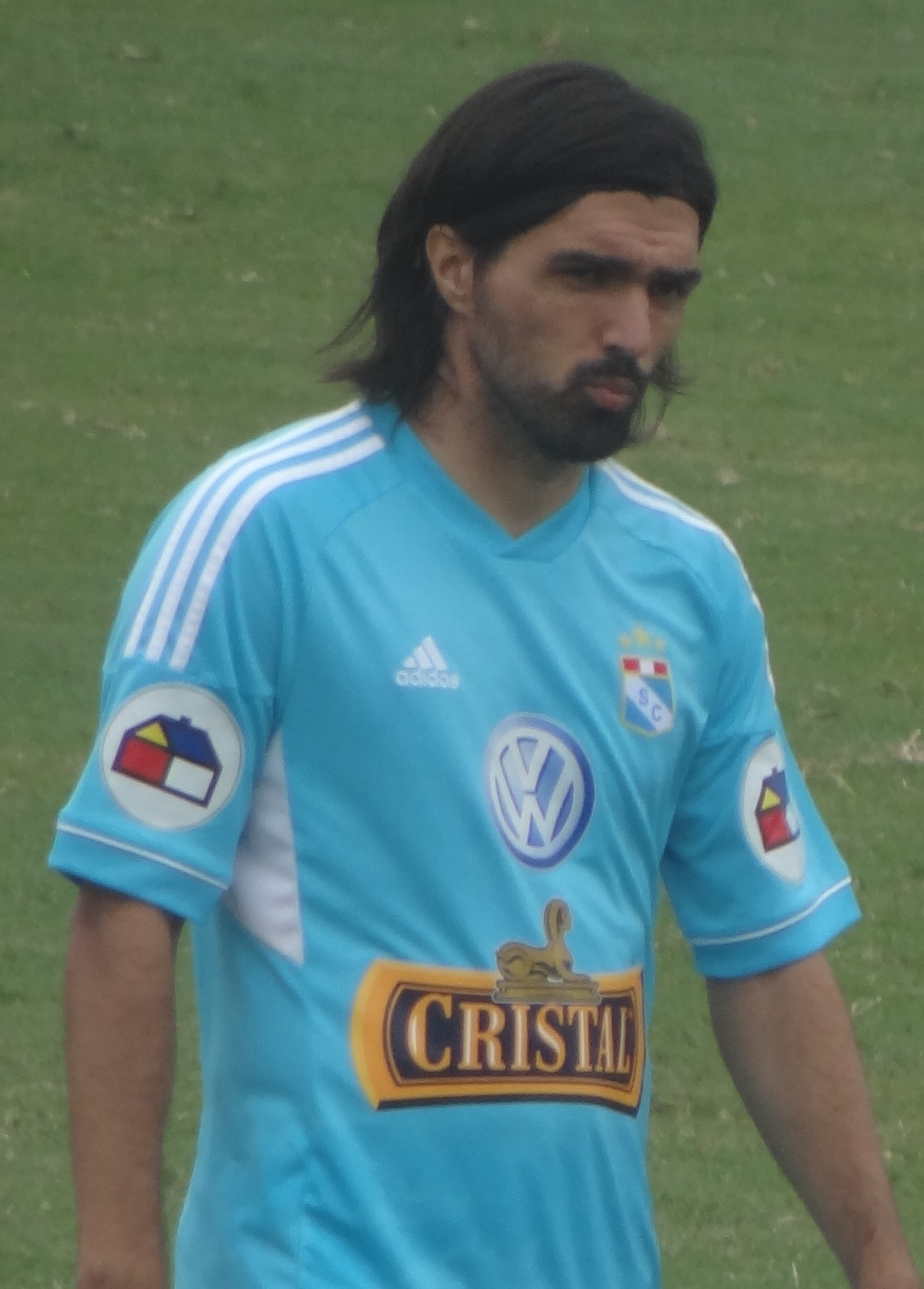
- Cazulo with Sporting Cristal

Personal information
- Full name: Jorge Luis Cazulo
- Date of birth: 14 February 1982 (age 44)
- Place of birth: Montevideo, Uruguay
- Height: 1.72 m (5 ft 8 in)
- Position: Defensive midfielder

Team information
- Current team: Boston River (manager)

Senior career*
| Years | Team | Apps | (Gls) |
| 2008 | Plaza Colonia | 29 | (0) |
| 2005 | Miramar | 25 | (0) |
| 2006 | Peñarol | 6 | (0) |
| 2006 | Bella Vista | 9 | (0) |
| 2007 | Maldonado | 0 | (0) |
| 2007 | Rampla Juniors | 14 | (2) |
| 2008 | Defensor Sporting | 7 | (2) |
| 2008–2009 | Nacional | 7 | (1) |
| 2009 | Maldonado | 1 | (0) |
| 2010 | Racing | 13 | (2) |
| 2010–2011 | Univ. César Vallejo | 39 | (5) |
| 2012–2020 | Sporting Cristal | 308+ | (17+) |

Managerial career
- 2022: Sporting Cristal U20
- 2025–2026: Defensa y Justicia (assistant)
- 2026–: Boston River
- * Club domestic league appearances and goals

Jorge Luis Cazulo (born 14 February 1982) is an Uruguayan football manager and former player who played as a defensive midfielder. He is the current manager of Boston River.

== Club career ==
Cazulo started his career Uruguayan club Plaza Colonia in 2004. He has also played for Defensor Sporting and Nacional in Uruguay.

== Honours ==
Defensor Sporting

- Uruguayan Primera División: 2007–08

Nacional

- Uruguayan Primera División: 2008–09

Sporting Cristal

- Torneo Descentralizado: 2012, 2014, 2016, 2018
- Liga 1: 2020
