= 2010 Sporting Cristal season =

Sporting Cristal
2010 season
- Owner: Backus and Johnston
- Coach: Víctor Rivera
- Stadium: San Martín de Porres, Lima
- Torneo Descentralizado: First Stage: Seventh (7°); Second Stage: Fourth (4°) (Liguilla A); Aggregate Table: Seventh (7°); Seventh National (7°)
Home colours	Away colours	Third colours

The 2010 Sporting Cristal season were the Fifty-Fifth (55.º) of the club from its foundation in 1955, Fifty-Five (55) participations consecutives in the top-flight of Peruvian Primera División (of 94 Editions) with denomination Torneo Descentralizado. In Previous Season the club qualified as 10th Place of the 2009 Torneo Descentralizado.

Sporting Cristal were a of sixteen (16) clubs in the Forty-Fifth edition (45.º) Torneo Descentralizado, the competition most important of the Peruvian football. The club played the Peruvian Primera División.

== Squad ==
=== First-team squad ===
As of March 2010 .

Note: Flags indicate national team as defined under FIFA eligibility rules; some limited exceptions apply. Players may hold more than one non-FIFA nationality.

No.	Pos.	Nation	Player
1	GK	PER	Erick Delgado
2	DF	PER	Wenceslao Fernández
3	DF	PER	Miguel Villalta
4	MF	PER	Israel Tordoya
5	DF	PER	José Zamora
6	DF	PAR	Ricardo Martínez
7	MF	PER	Yancarlo Casas
8	MF	PER	Bryan Salazar
9	FW	PER	Jorge Leiva
10	MF	PER	Roberto Palacios
11	MF	PER	Damián Ísmodes
12	GK	PER	José Carvallo
13	DF	PER	Jeickson Reyes
14	FW	PER	Yosimar Yotún
15	MF	PER	Jean Pierre Cáncar

No.	Pos.	Nation	Player
16	MF	PER	Marcio Valverde
17	FW	PER	Luis Advíncula
18	FW	URU	Miguel Ximénez
19	MF	PER	Edwin Pérez
20	DF	PER	Juan Lojas
21	FW	PER	Héctor Cruz
22	FW	COL	Oscar Villareal
23	MF	PER	Daniel Sánchez
25	GK	PER	Julio Aliaga
26	FW	PER	Franco Navarro
27	MF	PER	Carlos Lobatón
28	FW	PER	Janio Posito
29	FW	PER	Tarek Carranza
30	MF	PER	Diego Chávarri
35	GK	PER	Luis Ortiz

=== Transfers ===
==== In ====
Note: Flags indicate national team as defined under FIFA eligibility rules; some limited exceptions apply. Players may hold more than one non-FIFA nationality.

No.	Pos.	Nation	Player
18	FW	URU	Miguel Ximénez (from Club Libertad)
1	GK	PER	Erick Delgado (from Juan Aurich)
5	DF	PER	José Zamora (from Colegio Nacional Iquitos)
22	FW	COL	Oscar Villareal (from Cienciano)
16	MF	PER	Marcio Valverde (from Alianza Atlético)
4	MF	PER	Israel Tordoya (from Alianza Atlético)
6	DF	PAR	Ricardo Martínez (from Club Sol de América)
9	FW	PER	Jorge Leiva (from Inti Gas Deportes)
25	GK	PER	Julio Aliaga (back from loan at Coronel Bolognesi)
17	FW	PER	Luis Advíncula (from Juan Aurich)
8	MF	PER	Bryan Salazar (back from loan at Coronel Bolognesi)

==== Out ====
Note: Flags indicate national team as defined under FIFA eligibility rules; some limited exceptions apply. Players may hold more than one non-FIFA nationality.

No.	Pos.	Nation	Player
—	DF	URU	Alejandro Gonzales (to C.A. Peñarol)
—	GK	PER	Manuel Heredia (to Total Chalaco)
—	MF	PER	Renzo Sheput (to La Equidad)
—	DF	PER	Amilton Prado (to Alianza Lima)
—	FW	COL	Héctor Hurtado (to C.D. Universidad César Vallejo)
—	FW	URU	Junior Aliberti (to Deportivo Pasto)
—	FW	PER	Flavio Maestri (Released)
—	FW	PER	Roberto Jimenez (loan ended, to Deportes La Serena)
—	FW	PER	Manuel Tejada (to C.D. Universidad César Vallejo)
—	MF	PER	Antonio Lizarbe (to Sport Boys)
—	MF	PER	Marcos Delgado (to Coronel Bolognesi)

==== Out on loan ====
Note: Flags indicate national team as defined under FIFA eligibility rules; some limited exceptions apply. Players may hold more than one non-FIFA nationality.

No.	Pos.	Nation	Player
—	MF	PER	César Ruiz (to Coronel Bolognesi)

== Club ==
=== Management ===
Position	Staff
Head Coach	(Peru) Víctor Rivera
Assistant Coach	(Uruguay) Gustavo Roverano
Assistant Coach	(Peru) Hector Velasquez
Goalkeeper Coach	(Peru) Sergio López
Fitness Coach	(Uruguay) Juan Tchadkijian
Club doctor	(Peru) Ramon Aparicio
Club doctor	(Peru) Elisban Linares
Physiotherapist	(Peru) Antonio Rodas
Equipment manager	(Peru) Miguel Angel Linares
Amasa Huevos	(Peru) Juan Carlos Oblitas

Last updated: March 4, 2010

=== Other information ===
Owner	(Peru) Backus and Johnston
Ground (capacity and dimensions)	Estadio San Martín de Porres (18,000 / N/A)

Source: Sporting Cristal

== Primera División Peruana ==
=== First stage ===
Pos	Team	Pld	W	D	L	GF	GA	GD	Pts	Second Stage placement
5	Universitario	30	16	5	9	43	22	+21	51 (Note: Universitario were deducted 2 points for failing to pay a former manager Ricardo Gareca.)	Liguilla A
6	Juan Aurich	30	13	9	8	42	31	+11	48	Liguilla B
7	Sporting Cristal	30	12	8	10	43	42	+1	44	Liguilla A
8	Sport Huancayo	30	11	5	14	44	48	−4	38	Liguilla B
9	Inti Gas	30	12	2	16	36	43	−7	38	Liguilla A

Updated to match(es) played on August 29, 2010. Source: Soccerway
Rules for classification: 1) points; 2) goal difference; 3) number of goals scored.
Notes:

=== Results summary ===
Round	1	2	3	4	5	6	7	8	9	10	11	12	13	14	15	16	17	18	19	20	21	22	23	24	25	26	27	28	29	30
Ground	A	H	A	H	A	H	A	H	A	H	A	A	H	A	H	H	A	H	A	H	A	H	A	H	A	H	H	A	H	A
Result	W	W	W	W	T	L	W	W	L	W	T	T	W	T	L	L														

Updated to match(es) played on February 13, 2010. Source: elcristalconquetemiro.com
A = Away; H = Home; W = Win; L = Loss; T = Tie

=== Second stage ===
The Second Stage will begin September. Each winner of each Liguilla will qualify for the 2011 Copa Libertadores Second Stage.

Pos	Team	Pld	W	D	L	GF	GA	GD	Pts
2	Alianza Lima	44	22	12	10	70	48	+22	78
3	Universitario	44	21	11	12	55	31	+24	72 (Note: Universitario were docked 2 points for failing to pay a former manager Ricardo Gareca.)
4	Sporting Cristal	44	18	10	16	58	54	+4	64
5	Inti Gas	44	17	5	22	63	69	−6	56
6	CNI	44	16	8	20	58	71	−13	52 (Note: Colegio Nacional Iquitos were docked 4 points for failing to pay two former players Enrique Ísmodes and Juan Montenegro.)

Updated to match(es) played on December 5, 2010. Source: Soccerway
Rules for classification: 1) points; 2) goal difference; 3) number of goals scored.

=== Matches ===
Win Tie Loss

==== First Stage ====
February 13, 2010	Universidad César Vallejo	2 - 3	Sporting Cristal	Trujillo, Peru
	Hurtado 16'; Candelo 88'	Report	Ximénez 27'; Ximénez 74'; Lobatón 94'	Stadium: Estadio Mansiche; Referee: Manuel Garay

February 20, 2010	Sporting Cristal	3 - 1	FBC Melgar	Lima, Peru
	Sanchez 13'; Palacios 33'; Casas 40'	Report	Meza-Cuadra 64'	Stadium: Estadio San Martín de Porres; Referee: Miguel Santiváñez

March 3, 2010	Universitario de Deportes	1 - 2	Sporting Cristal	Lima, Peru
	Vasquez 17'	Report	Lobatón 33'; Yotún 87'	Stadium: Estadio Monumental; Referee: Henry Gambetta

March 7, 2010	Sporting Cristal	1 - 0	León de Huánuco	Lima, Peru
	Advíncula 63'	Report		Stadium: Estadio San Martín de Porres; Referee: George Buckley

March 14, 2010	Alianza Atlético	0 - 0	Sporting Cristal	Piura, Peru
		Report		Stadium: Estadio Miguel Grau; Referee: Manuel Garay

March 21, 2010	Sporting Cristal	0 - 4	U. San Martín	Lima, Peru
		Report	Hebert Arriola 28'; Hebert Arriola 36'; Germán Alemanno 43'; Germán Alemanno 70'	Stadium: San Martín de Porres; Referee: Víctor Carrillo

March 28, 2010	Sport Boys	1 - 2	Sporting Cristal	Callao, Peru
	Garate 41'	Report	Villareal 8'; Ximénez 89'	Stadium: Estadio Miguel Grau; Referee: Héctor Pacheco

April 4, 2010	Sporting Cristal	4 - 1	Sport Huancayo	Lima, Peru
	Ximénez 19'; Ximénez 45'; Palacios 87'; Ximénez 91'	Report	Ávila 73'	Stadium: Estadio San Martín de Porres; Referee: Percy Rojas

April 10, 2010	Inti Gas Deportes	2 - 1	Sporting Cristal	Ayacucho, Peru
	Mendoza 39'; Aguirre 47'	Report	Ximénez 29'	Stadium: Estadio Ciudad de Cumaná; Referee: Diego Haro

April 18, 2010	Sporting Cristal	5 - 2	Colegio Nacional Iquitos	Lima, Peru
	Ximénez 40'; Villareal 49'; Ximénez 61'; Reyes 68'; Sanchez 89'	Report	Pando 4'; Pando 14'	Stadium: Estadio San Martín de Porres; Referee: Alejandro Villanueva

April 25, 2010	Jose Galvez	1 - 1	Sporting Cristal	Chimbote, Peru
	Collantes 48'	Report	Ximénez 14'	Stadium: Estadio Manuel Rivera Sanchez; Referee: Manuel Garay

May 2, 2010	Juan Aurich	2 - 2	Sporting Cristal	Chiclayo, Peru
	Ciciliano 27'; Zúñiga 52'	Report	Ximénez 34'; Advíncula 92'	Stadium: Estadio Elías Aguirre; Referee: Víctor Hugo Rivera

May 8, 2010	Sporting Cristal	1 - 0	Total Chalaco	Lima, Peru
	Ximénez 7'	Report		Stadium: Estadio San Martín de Porres; Referee: Eduardo Chirinos

May 17, 2010	Alianza Lima	1 - 1	Sporting Cristal	Lima, Peru
	Aguirre 7'	Report	Ísmodes 67'	Stadium: Estadio Alejandro Villanueva; Referee: Georges Buckley

May 22, 2010	Sporting Cristal	0 - 1	Cienciano	Lima, Peru
		Report	Salas 27'	Stadium: Estadio San Martín de Porres; Referee: Freddy Arellanos

May 30, 2010	Sporting Cristal	0 - 1	C.D. Universidad César Vallejo	Lima, Peru
		Report	Candelo 2'	Stadium: Estadio San Martín de Porres; Referee: Miguel Magallanes

June 6, 2010	FBC Melgar	1 - 1	Sporting Cristal	Arequipa, Peru
				Stadium: Estadio Mariano Melgar

June 9, 2010	Sporting Cristal	1 - 2	Universitario de Deportes	Lima, Peru
	Sánchez 91'			Stadium: Estadio San Martín de Porres

June 13, 2010	León de Huánuco	6 - 0	Sporting Cristal	Huánuco, Peru
				Stadium: Estadio Heraclio Tapia

June 20, 2010	Sporting Cristal	2 - 1	Alianza Atlético	Lima, Peru
	Ximénez 40'			Stadium: Estadio San Martín de Porres

June 27, 2010	Universidad San Martín	2 - 1	Sporting Cristal	Lima, Peru
				Stadium: Estadio Monumental

July 4, 2010	Sporting Cristal	1 - 1	Sport Boys	Lima, Peru
				Stadium: Estadio San Martín de Porres

July 11, 2010	Sport Huancayo	0 - 1	Sporting Cristal	Huancayo, Peru
	Ísmodes 90'			Stadium: Estadio Huancayo

July 18, 2010	Sporting Cristal	4 - 1	Inti Gas Deportes	Lima, Peru
	Miguel Ximénez		Yotun (og)	Stadium: Estadio San Martín de Porres

July 25, 2010	Colegio Nacional Iquitos	1 - 0	Sporting Cristal	Iquitos, Peru
	Pabón 71'			Stadium: Estadio Max Augustín

August 1, 2010	Sporting Cristal	1 - 2	José Gálvez	Lima, Peru
	Néculman 85'		Bonilla Leguizamón	Stadium: Estadio San Martín de Porres; Referee: Ivan Chang

August 8, 2010	Sporting Cristal	1 - 1	Juan Aurich	Lima, Peru
	Advíncula 64'		Ascoy 57'	Stadium: Estadio San Martín de Porres; Referee: George Buckley

August 15, 2010	Total Chalaco	1 - 0	Sporting Cristal	Huacho, Peru
	Mendoza 91'			Stadium: Estadio Segundo Aranda Torres

August 22, 2010	Sporting Cristal	1 - 0	Alianza Lima	Lima, Peru
	Cueto 85'			Stadium: Estadio San Martín de Porres

August 29, 2010	Cienciano	3 - 3	Sporting Cristal	Cuzco, Peru
				Stadium: Estadio Garcilaso

==== Second Stage ====
September 12, 2010	Sporting Cristal	0 – 1	Universidad San Martín	Lima, Peru
				Stadium: Estadio San Martín de Porres

September 19, 2010	Total Chalaco	0 - 1	Sporting Cristal

September 26, 2010	Sporting Cristal	4 - 2	Inti Gas Deportes	Lima, Peru
				Stadium: Estadio San Martín de Porres

September 29, 2010	Alianza Lima	3 - 1	Sporting Cristal	Lima, Peru
				Stadium: Estadio Alejandro Villanueva

October 3, 2009	Sporting Cristal	4 - 0	Colegio Nacional Iquitos	Lima, Peru
		Report		Stadium: Estadio San Martín de Porres; Referee: Roberto Mauro

October 18, 2009	Juan Aurich	0 - 0	Sporting Cristal	Chiclayo, Peru
		Report		Stadium: Estadio Elías Aguirre; Referee: Miguel Santibañez

October 24, 2009	Sporting Cristal	4 - 0	Sport Áncash	Lima, Peru
		Report		Stadium: Estadio San Martín de Porres; Referee: Albert Caballero

October 31, 2009	Inti Gas	2 - 0	Sporting Cristal	Ayacucho, Peru
		Report		Stadium: Estadio Ciudad de Cumaná; Referee: Víctor Carrillo

November 4, 2009	Sporting Cristal	3 - 2	José Gálvez	Lima, Peru
		Report		Stadium: Estadio San Martín de Porres; Referee: Miguel Magallanes

November 8, 2009	Alianza Lima	2 - 1	Sporting Cristal	Lima, Peru
		Report		Stadium: Estadio Alejandro Villanueva; Referee: Victor Hugo Rivera

November 15, 2009	Sporting Cristal	1 - 3	César Vallejo	Lima, Peru
		Report		Stadium: Estadio San Martín de Porres; Referee: Diego Haro

November 21, 2009	Colegio Nacional Iquitos	3 - 1	Sporting Cristal	Iquitos, Peru
		Report		Stadium: Max Augustín; Referee: Victor Hugo Carrillo

November 29, 2009	Sporting Cristal	0 - 1	Juan Aurich	Lima, Peru
		Report		Stadium: Estadio San Martín de Porres; Referee: George Buckley

December 6, 2009	Sport Áncash	1 - 0	Sporting Cristal	Caraz, Peru
		Report		Stadium: Carlos Lara Guerrero; Referee: Percy Rojas

== See also ==
- Club Sporting Cristal
- 2010 Torneo Descentralizado
