= 2009 Sporting Cristal season =

Sporting Cristal
2009 season
- Owner: Backus and Johnston
- Coach: Juan Carlos Oblitas
- Stadium: San Martín de Porres, Lima
- Torneo Descentralizado: First Stage: Seventh (7°); Second Stage: Fifth (5°) (Liguilla A); Aggregate Table: Tenth (10°); Tenth National (10°)
Home colours	Away colours	Third colours

The 2009 Sporting Cristal season were the Fifty-Fourth (54.º) of the club from its foundation in 1955, Fifty-Four (54) participations consecutives in the top-flight of Peruvian Primera División (of 93 Editions) with denomination Torneo Descentralizado. In Previous Season the club qualified as 3rd Place of the 2008 Torneo Descentralizado.

Sporting Cristal were a of sixteen (16) clubs in the Forty-Fourth edition (44.º) Torneo Descentralizado, the competition most important of the Peruvian football. The club played the Peruvian Primera División and Copa Libertadores for Twenty-Eighth (28th) Time.

== Squad ==
=== First-team squad ===
As of August 2009.

Note: Flags indicate national team as defined under FIFA eligibility rules; some limited exceptions apply. Players may hold more than one non-FIFA nationality.

No.	Pos.	Nation	Player
1	GK	PER	José Carvallo
2	DF	PER	Wenceslao Fernández
3	DF	PER	Miguel Villalta
4	DF	URU	Alejandro Gonzales
5	DF	PER	Víctor Anchante
6	MF	PER	Antonio Lizarbe
7	FW	URU	Junior Aliberti
8	MF	PER	Renzo Sheput
9	FW	PER	Flavio Maestri
10	MF	PER	Roberto Palacios (captain)
11	MF	PER	Damián Ísmodes
12	GK	PER	Manuel Heredia
13	MF	PER	Jeickson Reyes
14	FW	PER	Yoshimar Yotún

No.	Pos.	Nation	Player
15	MF	PER	Jean Pierre Cáncar
16	DF	PER	Juan Lojas
17	DF	PER	Diego Chávarri
18	FW	COL	Héctor Hurtado
19	MF	PER	Edwin Pérez
21	GK	PER	Víctor Ulloa
22	DF	PER	Amilton Prado
23	MF	PER	Daniel Sanchez
24	FW	PER	Héctor Cruz
26	FW	PER	Jaime Vásquez
27	MF	PER	Carlos Lobatón
29	FW	PER	Roberto Jiménez
30	MF	PER	Yancarlo Casas
—	FW	PER	Juan Quiñónez

=== Transfers ===
==== In ====
Note: Flags indicate national team as defined under FIFA eligibility rules; some limited exceptions apply. Players may hold more than one non-FIFA nationality.

No.	Pos.	Nation	Player
4	DF	URU	Alejandro Gonzales (from Tacuarembó F.C.)
13	DF	PER	Jeickson Reyes (from Alianza Lima)
5	MF	PER	Román Ojeda (from Atlético Minero)
16	MF	PER	Rodolfo Ojeda (from Atlético Minero)
30	MF	PER	Yancarlo Casas (from Coronel Bolognesi)
19	MF	PER	Edwin Pérez (from Universidad San Martín de Porres)
15	MF	PER	Jean Pierre Cáncar (from Sport Boys)
13	GK	PER	Manuel Heredia (from Coronel Bolognesi)
14	FW	PER	Franco Navarro (from Cienciano)
18	FW	COL	Héctor Hurtado (from Universitario de Deportes)
11	FW	URU	Junior Aliberti (from C.A. Cerro)
9	FW	PER	Flavio Maestri (from Sport Boys)
29	FW	PER	Roberto Jiménez (on loan from Club Atlético San Lorenzo de Almagro)
—	MF	PER	Damián Ísmodes (on loan from Racing de Santander)

==== Out ====
Note: Flags indicate national team as defined under FIFA eligibility rules; some limited exceptions apply. Players may hold more than one non-FIFA nationality.

No.	Pos.	Nation	Player
5	MF	PER	Román Ojeda (Released)
16	MF	PER	Rodolfo Ojeda (Released)
14	FW	PER	Franco Navarro (Released)
—	DF	PER	Christian Ramos (to Universidad San Martín de Porres)
—	DF	PER	Luis Daniel Hernández (to Juan Aurich)
1	GK	PER	Erick Delgado (to Juan Aurich)
—	MF	PER	Gianfranco Espejo (to Juan Aurich)
—	FW	PER	Janio Posito (to Coronel Bolognesi)
—	FW	PER	José Mesarina (to José Gálvez FBC)
—	MF	ARG	Franco Razzotti (Vélez Sársfield)
—	DF	PER	Juan Arce (to Sport Boys)

==== Out on loan ====
Note: Flags indicate national team as defined under FIFA eligibility rules; some limited exceptions apply. Players may hold more than one non-FIFA nationality.

No.	Pos.	Nation	Player
—	MF	PER	César Ruiz (to Coronel Bolognesi)
—	MF	PER	Bryan Salazar (to Coronel Bolognesi)
—	GK	PER	Julio Aliaga (to Coronel Bolognesi)
—	FW	PER	Manuel Tejada (to C.D. Universidad César Vallejo)
—	MF	PER	Marcos Delgado (to Coronel Bolognesi)

== Club ==
=== Management ===
Position	Staff
Head Coach	(Peru) Juan Carlos Oblitas
Assistant Coach	(Peru) Fernando Oblitas
Goalkeeper Coach	(Peru) Elías Acevedo
Director of Youth Squads	(Argentina) Walter Fiori
Athletic trainer	(Argentina) Rubén Sole
Head of Medical Department	(Peru) Ramon Aparicio
Equipment manager	(Peru) Miguel Angel Linares

Last updated: July 4, 2009

=== Other information ===
Owner	(Peru) Backus and Johnston
Ground (capacity and dimensions)	Estadio San Martín de Porres (18,000 / N/A)

Source: Sporting Cristal

== Peruvian Primera División ==
=== First stage ===
==== Standings ====
Pos	Team	Pld	W	D	L	GF	GA	GD	Pts	Second Stage placement
5	Universidad César Vallejo	30	13	9	8	41	33	+8	48	Liguilla A
6	Universidad San Martín	30	12	11	7	45	34	+11	47 (Note: U. San Martin was docked three points the first round for fielding four foreign players. The points from the 3–0 loss were not awarded to the opposing team.)	Liguilla B
7	Sporting Cristal	30	12	6	12	53	36	+17	42	Liguilla A
8	Cienciano	30	10	12	8	41	38	+3	42	Liguilla B
9	Inti Gas	30	11	8	11	36	31	+5	41	Liguilla A

Updated to match(es) played on September 2, 2009. Source: RSSSF
Rules for classification: 1) points; 2) goal difference; 3) number of goals scored.
Notes:

==== Results summary ====
Round	1	2	3	4	5	6	7	8	9	10	11	12	13	14	15	16	17	18	19	20	21	22	23	24	25	26	27	28	29	30
Ground	A	H	A	H	A	H	A	H	A	H	A	H	A	A	H	H	A	H	A	H	A	H	A	H	A	H	A	H	H	A
Result	T	W	W	L	W	T	L	W	L	L	L	L	L	W	W	W	W	W	T	L	L	T	T	L	T	W	L	W	W	L

Updated to match(es) played on August 19, 2009. Source: futbolperuano.com
A = Away; H = Home; W = Win; L = Loss; T = Tie

=== Second stage ===
The Second Stage will begin on September 13 where the 16 teams will be divided into two groups and play a total of 14 home-and-away fixtures. Each winner will qualify for the Copa Libertadores 2009 Second Stage.

==== Standings ====
Pos	Team	Pld	W	D	L	GF	GA	GD	Pts
3	Universidad César Vallejo	44	17	16	11	59	51	+8	67
4	Inti Gas	44	18	10	16	58	51	+7	64
5	Sporting Cristal	44	16	9	19	71	55	+16	57
6	José Gálvez	44	15	7	22	43	59	−16	52
7	CNI	44	14	8	22	39	59	−20	50

Updated to match(es) played on December 6, 2009. Source: RSSSF
Rules for classification: 1) points; 2) goal difference; 3) number of goals scored.

== Aggregate table ==
The aggregate table will determine the third and last team to qualify to the 2010 Copa Libertadores, the three who qualify to the 2010 Copa Sudamericana, and the two teams to be relegated to the Segunda División. The aggregate table consists of the points earned in the First and Second stages.

Pos	Team	Pld	W	D	L	GF	GA	GD	Pts
8	Melgar	44	15	13	16	59	62	−3	58
9	Cienciano	44	14	16	14	58	63	−5	58
10	Sporting Cristal	44	16	9	19	71	55	+16	57
11	José Gálvez	44	15	7	22	43	59	−16	52
12	Total Chalaco	44	12	15	17	61	62	−1	51

Updated to match(es) played on December 6, 2009. Source: FIFA Standings
Rules for classification: 1) points; 2) goal difference; 3) number of goals scored.
Universitario and Alianza Lima qualified to the Copa Libertadores group stage by winning their respective Liguillas.

=== Matches ===
Win Tie Loss

==== First Stage ====
February 14, 2009	Colegio Nacional Iquitos	0 – 0	Sporting Cristal	Iquitos, Peru
		Report		Stadium: Max Augustín; Referee: Percy Rojas

February 22, 2009	Sporting Cristal	5 – 0	Alianza Atlético	Lima, Peru
	Héctor Hurtado 10'; Héctor Hurtado (yellow card) 29'; Edwin Pérez (yellow card) 34'; Junior Aliberti 48'; Wenceslao Fernández (yellow card) 59'; Carlos Lobatón 61'; Wenceslao Fernández (red card) 59'; Renzo Sheput 80'; Héctor Hurtado 82'	Report	Marcio Valverde (yellow card) 18'; Henry Colan (yellow card) 39'; Henry Colan (yellow card) 84' (red card)	Stadium: San Martín de Porres; Referee: Miguel Santibáñez

March 1, 2009	Sport Áncash	0 – 5	Sporting Cristal	Caraz, Peru
	Giancarlo Gomez (red card) 16'; Juan Vergara (yellow card) 61'; Carlos Flores (yellow card) 63'	Report	Junior Aliberti 25'; Amilton Prado (yellow card) 58'; Alejandro Gonzales (yellow card) 65'; Héctor Hurtado 72'; Héctor Hurtado 74'; Carlos Lobatón 81'; Flavio Maestri 85'	Stadium: Carlos Lara Guerrero; Referee: Víctor Hugo Carrillo

March 8, 2009	Sporting Cristal	0 – 2	Cienciano	Lima, Peru
		Report	Oscar Villarreal 64'; Sergio Junior 93'	Stadium: San Martín de Porres; Referee: Víctor Hugo Rivera

March 15, 2009	Total Chalaco	1 – 3	Sporting Cristal	Callao, Peru
	Richard Estigarrabia 19'; Paul Rodriguez (yellow card) 64'	Report	Junior Aliberti 23'; Miguel Villalta (yellow card) 26'; Renzo Sheput 59'; Roberto Palacios (yellow card) 68'; Héctor Hurtado 70'; Amilton Prado (yellow card) 90'	Stadium: Miguel Grau; Referee: Héctor Pacheco

March 22, 2009	Sporting Cristal	2 – 2	Inti Gas	Lima, Peru
	Alejandro González 27'; Renzo Sheput 44'	Report	Hector Ramirez 14'; Edgar Ospina (red card) 46'; Edwin Retamozo 91'	Stadium: San Martín de Porres; Referee: Robert Rafael

April 5, 2009	Universitario	1 – 0	Sporting Cristal	Lima, Peru
	John Galliquio (yellow card) 15'; Carlos Orejuela (yellow card) 38'; Johan Vásquez 59'	Report	Alejandro González (yellow card) 6'; Miguel Villalta (yellow card) 39'; Jean Pierre Cáncar (yellow card) 66'	Stadium: Monumental; Referee: Víctor Hugo Carrillo

April 11, 2009	Sporting Cristal	5 – 0	Coronel Bolognesi	Lima, Peru
	Renzo Sheput 15' 21'; Edwin Pérez (yellow card) 24'; Héctor Hurtado 26'; Daniel Sanchez 56'; Daniel Sanchez (yellow card) 56'; Flavio Maestri 89'	Report	Jose Zavala (yellow card) 53'	Stadium: Estadio San Martín de Porres; Referee: Percy Rojas

April 19, 2009	Alianza Lima	2 – 1	Sporting Cristal	Lima, Peru
	Wilmer Aguirre 85'; Aldo Corzo (yellow card) 19'; Leandro Fleitas (yellow card) 44'; Paolo de la Haza (yellow card) 50'; Juan Diego Gonzales Vigil 87'	Report	Renzo Sheput 11'; Edwin Pérez (yellow card) 48'; Manuel Heredia (yellow card) 75'	Stadium: Estadio Alejandro Villanueva; Referee: Víctor Hugo Rivera

April 25, 2009	Sporting Cristal	3 – 4	U. San Martin	Lima, Peru
	Junior Aliberti 30'; Jean Pierre Cáncar (yellow card) 38'; Héctor Hurtado 63'; Héctor Hurtado (yellow card) 68'; Víctor Anchante 72'; Alejandro González (yellow card) 74'	Report	Martín Arzuaga 44'; Gonzalo Ludueña 47'; Martín Arzuaga 65'; Martín Arzuaga 67'	Stadium: Estadio San Martín de Porres; Referee: Miguel Garay

May 3, 2009	José Gálvez	2 – 1	Sporting Cristal	Chimbote, Peru
	Paul Cominges 13'; Victor Oviedo (yellow card) 44'; Miguel Llanos (red card) 49'; Luis Mayme (yellow card) 59'; Manuel Barreto 70'	Report	Carlos Lobatón (yellow card) 30'; Miguel Villalta (yellow card) 35'; Roberto Palacios (yellow card) 55'; Héctor Hurtado 56'; Jeickson Reyes (yellow card) 79'; Héctor Hurtado (yellow card) 82'; Miguel Villalta (yellow card) 83' (red card)	Stadium: Estadio Manuel Rivera Sanchez; Referee: Miguel Santiváñez

May 10, 2009	Sporting Cristal	1 – 2	FBC Melgar	Lima, Peru
	Junior Aliberti 38'; Víctor Anchante (red card) 92'	Report	Javier Pereyra (yellow card) 22'; Alvaro Méndez 36'; Ysrael Zuñiga 46'; Ysrael Zuñiga (yellow card) 53'; Jesus Arismendi (yellow card) 80'	Stadium: Estadio San Martín de Porres

May 13, 2009	Juan Aurich	2 – 1	Sporting Cristal	Chiclayo, Peru
		Report		Stadium: Estadio Elías Aguirre

May 17, 2009	Sport Huancayo	0 – 2	Sporting Cristal	Huancayo, Peru
		Report		Stadium: Cuarto Centenario; Referee: a

May 23, 2009	Sporting Cristal	1 – 0	Universidad César Vallejo	Lima, Peru
		Report		Stadium: Estadio San Martín de Porres

May 31, 2009	Sporting Cristal	2 – 0	Colegio Nacional Iquitos	Lima, Peru
		Report		Stadium: Estadio San Martín de Porres

June 14, 2009	Alianza Atlético	0 – 2	Sporting Cristal	Sullana, Peru
		Report		Stadium: Campeones del 36; Referee: Robert Rafael

June 20, 2009	Sporting Cristal	2 – 0	Sport Áncash	Lima, Peru
		Report		Stadium: Estadio San Martín de Porres; Referee: Víctor Hugo Carrillo

June 28, 2009	Cienciano	5– 5	Sporting Cristal	Cuzco, Peru
		Report		Stadium: Estadio Garcilaso; Referee: Manuel Garay

July 5, 2009	Sporting Cristal	0 – 1	Total Chalaco	Lima, Peru
		Report		Stadium: Estadio San Martín de Porres

July 11, 2009	Inti Gas	3 – 1	Sporting Cristal	Ayacucho, Peru
		Report		Stadium: Estadio Ciudad de Cumaná; Referee: Percy Rojas

July 18, 2009	Sporting Cristal	1 – 1	Universitario	Callao, Peru
		Report		Stadium: Estadio Miguel Grau; Referee: Víctor Hugo Rivera

July 25, 2009	Coronel Bolognesi	2 – 2	Sporting Cristal	Tacna, Peru
		Report		Stadium: Estadio Jorge Basadre; Referee: Diego Haro

July 29, 2009	Sporting Cristal	0 – 1	Alianza Lima	Callao, Peru
		Report		Stadium: Estadio Miguel Grau; Referee: Víctor Hugo Carrillo

August 1, 2009	U. San Martin	2 – 2	Sporting Cristal	Lima, Peru
		Report		Stadium: Estadio Alejandro Villanueva; Referee: Víctor Hugo Rivera

August 8, 2009	Sporting Cristal	2 – 0	José Gálvez	Lima, Peru
		Report		Stadium: Estadio San Martín de Porres; Referee: Roberto Mauro

August 17, 2009	FBC Melgar	1 – 0	Sporting Cristal	Arequipa, Peru
		Report		Stadium: Monumental de la UNSA; Referee: Georges Buckley

August 19, 2009	Sporting Cristal	1 – 0	Juan Aurich	Lima, Peru
		Report		Stadium: Estadio San Martín de Porres; Referee: Víctor Hugo Rivera

August 23, 2009	Sporting Cristal	3 – 1	Sport Huancayo	Lima, Peru
		Report		Stadium: Estadio San Martín de Porres; Referee: Diego Haro

August 29, 2009	Cesar Vallejo	1 - 0	Sporting Cristal	Trujillo, Peru
				Stadium: Estadio Mansiche; Referee: Víctor Hugo Carrillo

==== Second Stage ====
September 12, 2009	Sporting Cristal	2 – 1	Inti Gas	Lima, Peru
		Report		Stadium: Estadio San Martín de Porres; Referee: Miguel Santiváñez

September 16, 2009	José Gálvez	3 - 1	Sporting Cristal	Chimbote, Peru
		Report		Stadium: Estadio Manuel Rivera Sanchez; Referee: Percy Rojas

September 20, 2009	Sporting Cristal	1 - 1	Alianza Lima	Lima, Peru
		Report		Stadium: Estadio San Martín de Porres; Referee: George Buckley

September 27, 2009	César Vallejo	1 - 1	Sporting Cristal	Trujillo, Peru
		Report		Stadium: Mansiche Stadium; Referee: Victor Hugo Rivera

October 3, 2009	Sporting Cristal	4 - 0	Colegio Nacional Iquitos	Lima, Peru
		Report		Stadium: Estadio San Martín de Porres; Referee: Roberto Mauro

October 18, 2009	Juan Aurich	0 - 0	Sporting Cristal	Chiclayo, Peru
		Report		Stadium: Estadio Elías Aguirre; Referee: Miguel Santibañez

October 24, 2009	Sporting Cristal	4 - 0	Sport Áncash	Lima, Peru
		Report		Stadium: Estadio San Martín de Porres; Referee: Albert Caballero

October 31, 2009	Inti Gas	2 - 0	Sporting Cristal	Ayacucho, Peru
		Report		Stadium: Estadio Ciudad de Cumaná; Referee: Víctor Carrillo

November 4, 2009	Sporting Cristal	3 - 2	José Gálvez	Lima, Peru
		Report		Stadium: Estadio San Martín de Porres; Referee: Miguel Magallanes

November 8, 2009	Alianza Lima	2 - 1	Sporting Cristal	Lima, Peru
		Report		Stadium: Estadio Alejandro Villanueva; Referee: Victor Hugo Rivera

November 15, 2009	Sporting Cristal	1 - 3	César Vallejo	Lima, Peru
		Report		Stadium: Estadio San Martín de Porres; Referee: Diego Haro

November 21, 2009	Colegio Nacional Iquitos	3 - 1	Sporting Cristal	Iquitos, Peru
		Report		Stadium: Max Augustín; Referee: Victor Hugo Carrillo

November 29, 2009	Sporting Cristal	0 - 1	Juan Aurich	Lima, Peru
		Report		Stadium: Estadio San Martín de Porres; Referee: George Buckley

December 6, 2009	Sport Áncash	1 - 0	Sporting Cristal	Caraz, Peru
		Report		Stadium: Carlos Lara Guerrero; Referee: Percy Rojas

=== 2009 Copa Libertadores ===
2009-01-29	Sporting Cristal (Peru)	2 – 1	(Argentina) Estudiantes	Estadio San Martín de Porres, Lima
15:00 (UTC-5)	Palacios 42'; Hurtado 55'	Report	Pérez 29'	Attendance: 16,302; Referee: Carlos Chandía (Chile)

2009-02-04	Estudiantes (Argentina)	1 – 0	(Peru) Sporting Cristal	Estadio Ciudad de La Plata, La Plata
20:30 (UTC-3)	Lentini 76'	Report		Attendance: 20,426; Referee: Leonardo Gaciba (Brazil)

Estudiantes advances on away goals.

== See also ==
- Club Sporting Cristal
- 2009 Torneo Descentralizado
