= 2011 Sporting Cristal season =

Sporting Cristal
2011 season
- President: Felipe Cantuarias
- Coach: Guillermo Rivarola (until 19 April); Juan Reynoso (until 23 November); Francisco Melgar (from 23 November)
- Stadium: San Martín de Porres, Lima
- Torneo Descentralizado: First Stage: Thirteenth (13°); Second Stage: Tenth (10°); Aggregate Table: Tenth (10°); Tenth National (10°)
- Copa del Inca: Semi-finals
- Top goalscorer: League: Miguel Ximénez (6); All: Miguel Ximénez (6)
- Highest home attendance: 10,582 vs Cienciano (Torneo Descentralizado, 20 March 2011)
Home colours	Away colours	Third colours

The 2011 Sporting Cristal season were the Fifty-Sixth (56.º) of the club from its foundation in 1955, Fifty-Six (56) participations consecutives in the top-flight of Peruvian Primera División (of 95 Editions) with denomination Torneo Descentralizado. In Previous Season the club qualified as 7th Place of the 2010 Torneo Descentralizado.

Sporting Cristal were a of sixteen (16) clubs in the Forty-Sixth edition (46.º) Torneo Descentralizado, the competition most important of the Peruvian football. The club played the Peruvian Primera División.

== 2011 squad ==
Note: Flags indicate national team as defined under FIFA eligibility rules; some limited exceptions apply. Players may hold more than one non-FIFA nationality.

No.	Pos.	Nation	Player
1	GK	PER	Erick Delgado
2	DF	PER	Wenceslao Fernández
3	DF	ARG	Germán Rivera
4	DF	PER	Walter Vilchez (vice-captain)
5	MF	ARG	Alejandro Frezzotti
7	MF	PER	Yancarlo Casas
8	MF	PER	Minzum Quina
9	FW	PER	José Shoro
10	MF	PER	Roberto Palacios (captain)
11	FW	PER	Iván Bulos
12	GK	PER	Manuel Heredia
13	DF	PER	Renzo Revoredo
14	MF	PER	Yoshimar Yotún
15	MF	PER	Alfonso García-Miró
16	MF	PER	Marcio Valverde
17	FW	PER	Luis Advíncula

No.	Pos.	Nation	Player
18	FW	URU	Miguel Ximenez
19	FW	PER	Juan Diego González-Vigil
20	DF	PER	Juan Lojas
21	MF	MEX	Rodolfo Espinoza
22	DF	PER	Willy Rivas
23	FW	PER	Piero Alva
24	FW	PER	Junior Ross
25	GK	PER	Julio Aliaga
26	MF	PER	Tarek Carranza
27	MF	PER	Carlos Lobatón
28	DF	PER	José Granda
29	MF	PER	Claudio Torrejón
30	MF	PER	Diego Chávarri
—	GK	PER	Luis Ortiz
—	FW	PER	Pedro Aquino
—	FW	PER	Pierr Saavedra

== Transfers ==
=== In ===
As of 1 December 2011

#	Pos.	Player	Transferred from	Date	Type	Fee	Source
4	DF	(Peru) Walter Vílchez	(Peru) Alianza Lima	27 December 2010	Transfer	Free	elcomercio.pe
8	DF	(Peru) Minzum Quina	(Peru) Alianza Atlético	1 January 2011	Transfer	Undisclosed	
3	DF	(Argentina) Germán Rivera	(Italy) Città di Marino	1 January 2011	Transfer	Free	
6	MF	(Peru) Gianfranco Espejo	(Peru) Juan Aurich	1 January 2011	Transfer	Undisclosed	
24	DF	(Paraguay) Carlos Espínola	(Ecuador) LDU Quito	1 January 2011			
	FW	(Argentina) Luis Escalada	(Ecuador) Deportivo Cuenca	1 January 2011			
29	MF	(Peru) Claudio Torrejón	Sporting Cristal Reserves and Academy	1 January 2011			
	MF	(Peru) Pedro Aquino	Sporting Cristal Reserves and Academy	1 January 2011			
11	FW	(Peru) Iván Bulos	Sporting Cristal Reserves and Academy	1 January 2011			
	DF	(Peru) Wilson Vizconte	Sporting Cristal Reserves and Academy	1 January 2011			
5	MF	(Argentina) Alejandro Frezzotti	(Argentina) Gimnasia La Plata	15 March 2011	Transfer		
21	MF	(Mexico) Rodolfo Espinoza	Free Agent	2 June 2011	Transfer	Free	
19	FW	(Peru) Juan Diego González-Vigil	(Peru) León de Huánuco	9 June 2011	Transfer		
	FW	(Peru) Cristian Adrianzén	Sporting Cristal Reserves and Academy	1 June 2011			
22	DF	(Peru) Willy Rivas	(Mexico) Irapuato	10 June 2011	Loan	Undisclosed	depor.pe
24	FW	(Peru) Junior Ross	(Poland) Arka Gdynia	10 June 2011	Transfer	Free	depor.pe
23	FW	(Peru) Piero Alva	(Peru) Universitario de Deportes	15 June 2011	Transfer		
13	DF	(Peru) Renzo Revoredo	(Peru) Universitario de Deportes	10 August 2011	Transfer	Free	
9	FW	(Peru) José Shoro	(Peru) Alianza Unicachi	25 August 2011	Transfer	Undisclosed	depor.pe

=== Out ===
As of 1 December 2011

#	Pos.	Player	Transferred to	Date	Type	Fee	Source
11	FW	(Peru) Damián Ísmodes	(Peru) Universitario de Deportes	24 December 2010	End of loan	N/A	
19	MF	(Peru) Edwin Pérez	(Peru) León de Huánuco	1 January 2011			
13	DF	(Peru) Jeickson Reyes	(Peru) Universidad César Vallejo	1 January 2011			
12	GK	(Peru) José Carvallo	(Peru) FBC Melgar	1 January 2011			
3	DF	(Peru) Miguel Villalta	(Peru) FBC Melgar	1 January 2011			
19	MF	(Peru) Jaime Vásquez	(Peru) Unión Comercio	1 January 2011			
6	DF	(Paraguay) Ricardo Martínez	(Paraguay) Sol de América	1 January 2011			
8	MF	(Peru) Bryan Salazar	(Peru) Alianza Atlético	1 January 2011			
5	DF	(Peru) José Zamora	(Peru) Colegio Nacional Iquitos	1 January 2011			
15	DF	(Colombia) Breyner Bonilla	(Colombia) Cúcuta Deportivo	1 January 2011	End of loan	N/A	
8	FW	(Peru) Anderson Cueto	(Peru) Juan Aurich	1 January 2011			
	FW	(Argentina) Luis Escalada	Free Agent	1 June 2011	Released	N/A	Depor.pe
23	MF	(Peru) Daniel Sanchez	(Peru) Universidad César Vallejo	9 June 2011			
24	DF	(Paraguay) Carlos Espínola	Free Agent	9 June 2011	Released	N/A	
15	DF	(Peru) Jean Pierre Cáncar	Free Agent	1 July 2011	Released	N/A	
21	FW	(Peru) Héctor Cruz	(Peru) León de Huánuco	28 July 2011			
22	FW	(Peru) Andy Pando	(Peru) León de Huánuco	25 August 2011			

== Team kit ==
Supplier: Umbro
Sponsor(s): Cerveza Cristal and Volkswagen

Home	Away	Third

Last updated: 24 December 2011.
Source: Umbro Sporting Cristal

== Competitions ==
=== Overall ===
This season Sporting Cristal participated in two major competitions: the Torneo Descentralizado and the Torneo Intermedio.

Competition	Started round	Final position / round	First match	Last match
Torneo Descentralizado	—	10th	13 February 2011	4 December 2011
Torneo Intermedio	First Round	Semi-finals	29 May 2011	13 July 2011

Updated to match played 24 December 2011
Source: Competitions

=== Torneo Descentralizado ===
Win Draw Loss

13 February 2011 1	Sporting Cristal	1 – 2	FBC Melgar	Lima
	Lojas 72'	Report	56' Meza Cuadra; 81' Ojeda	Stadium: Estadio San Martín de Porres; Attendance: 6,866; Referee: Robert Rafael

19 February 2011 2	Sport Boys	0 – 1	Sporting Cristal	Callao
		Report	90+1' Escalada	Stadium: Estadio Miguel Grau; Attendance: 9,546; Referee: Georges Buckley

26 February 2011 3	Sporting Cristal	1 – 1	Alianza Lima	Lima
	Chávarri 34'	Report	47' (pen.) Quinteros	Stadium: Estadio San Martín de Porres; Attendance: 9,855; Referee: Víctor Hugo Carrillo

5 March 2011 4	Alianza Atlético	2 – 1	Sporting Cristal	Piura
	Debrah 56'; Rey 90+2'	Report	58' Lojas	Stadium: Estadio Miguel Grau (Piura); Attendance: 3,435; Referee: Albert Caballero

12 March 2011 5	Sporting Cristal	2 – 1	Unión Comercio	Lima
	Ximénez 17'; Chávarri 29'	Report	61' Laguna	Stadium: Estadio San Martín de Porres; Attendance: 4,520; Referee: Fredy Arellanos

20 March 2011 6	Sporting Cristal	1 – 0	Cienciano	Lima
	Ximénez 54'	Report		Stadium: Estadio San Martín de Porres; Attendance: 10,582; Referee: Víctor Hugo Rivera

2 April 2011 7	Inti Gas Deportes	2 – 0	Sporting Cristal	Ayacucho
	Osorio 58', 90+1'	Report		Stadium: Estadio Ciudad de Cumaná; Attendance: 3,829; Referee: Georges Buckley

17 April 2011 8	Sporting Cristal	1 – 1	Cobresol	Lima
	Ximénez 67'	Report	62' Velásquez	Stadium: Estadio San Martín de Porres; Attendance: 3,517; Referee: Henry Gambetta

24 April 2011 9	Universidad César Vallejo	1 – 0	Sporting Cristal	Trujillo
	Leguizamón 39'	Report		Stadium: Estadio Mansiche; Attendance: 8,132; Referee: Iván Chang

1 May 2011 10	Sporting Cristal	3 – 0 (awarded)	Universitario	Lima
		Report		Stadium: Estadio San Martín de Porres; Attendance: 9,960; Referee: Manuel Garay
Note: The actual match result was a 0–0 draw. However, Sporting Cristal lodged a complaint claiming that Universitario de Deportes failed to cancel their debt with respect to their player's wages. As a result the Justice Committee of the Peruvian Football Federation declared the complaint founded and awarded a 3–0 victory to Sporting Cristal.

7 May 2011 11	Juan Aurich	2 – 1	Sporting Cristal	Chiclayo
	Montes 31'; Tejada 74'	Report	17' Pando	Stadium: Estadio Elías Aguirre; Attendance: 6,231; Referee: Víctor Hugo Carrillo

11 May 2011 12	Sporting Cristal	1 – 1	Colegio Nacional Iquitos	Lima
	Escalada 83'	Report	50' Orlando	Stadium: Estadio San Martín de Porres; Attendance: 2,867; Referee: Georges Buckley

15 May 2011 13	Universidad San Martín	1 – 1	Sporting Cristal	Callao
	J. Sánchez 24'	Report	54' Frezzotti	Stadium: Estadio Miguel Grau; Attendance: 2,127; Referee: Henry Gambetta

18 May 2011 14	Sporting Cristal	0 – 2	León de Huánuco	Lima
		Report	14' G. Espinoza; 71' Céspedes	Stadium: Estadio San Martín de Porres; Attendance: 3,316; Referee: Manuel Garay

22 May 2011 15	Sport Huancayo	3 – 0	Sporting Cristal	Huancayo
	Ávila 44', 77'; Sotil 66'	Report		Stadium: Estadio Huancayo; Attendance: 4,368; Referee: Albert Caballero

30 July 2011 16	FBC Melgar	2 – 1	Sporting Cristal	Arequipa
	Villalta 36'; Meza Cuadra 40'	Report	85' Advíncula	Stadium: Estadio de la UNSA; Attendance: 4,623; Referee: Alejandro Villanueva

7 August 2011 17	Sporting Cristal	1 – 1	Sport Boys	Lima
	Lobatón 62'	Report	66' Franco	Stadium: Estadio San Martín de Porres; Attendance: 5,599; Referee: Miguel Santiváñez

13 August 2011 18	Alianza Lima	0 – 0	Sporting Cristal	Lima
		Report		Stadium: Matute; Attendance: 19.830; Referee: Víctor Hugo Rivera

20 August 2011 19	Sporting Cristal	1 – 0	Alianza Atlético	Lima
	Ximénez 53'	Report		Stadium: Estadio San Martín de Porres; Attendance: 3,522; Referee: Georges Buckley

27 August 2011 20	Unión Comercio	1 – 0	Sporting Cristal	Moyobamba
	Jiménez 57'	Report		Stadium: Estadio IPD de Moyobamba; Attendance: 3,860; Referee: Henry Gambetta

11 September 2011 21	Cienciano	0 – 1	Sporting Cristal	Cuzco
		Report	88' Lobatón	Stadium: Inca Garcilaso de la Vega; Attendance: 10,377; Referee: Manuel Garay

18 September 2011 22	Sporting Cristal	0 – 0	Inti Gas Deportes	Lima
		Report		Stadium: Estadio San Martín de Porres; Attendance: 4,.796; Referee: Víctor Hugo Rivera

25 September 2011 23	Cobresol	1 – 1	Sporting Cristal	Moquegua
	Neyra 15'	Report	84' Espinoza	Stadium: Estadio 25 de Noviembre; Attendance: 2,398

16 October 2011 24	Sporting Cristal	2 – 1	Universidad César Vallejo	Lima
	Ximénez 61'; Yotún 79'	Report	2' Faiffer	Stadium: Estadio San Martín de Porres; Attendance: 3,711; Referee: Manuel Garay

23 October 2011 25	Universitario	1 – 2	Sporting Cristal	Callao
	Galliquio 16'	Report	34', 41' Shoro	Stadium: Estadio Miguel Grau; Attendance: 3,670; Referee: Víctor Hugo Carrillo

30 October 2011 26	Sporting Cristal	0 – 2	Juan Aurich	Lima
		Report	28' (pen.) Tejada; 68' Sheput	Stadium: Estadio San Martín de Porres; Attendance: 8,523; Referee: Henry Gambetta

6 November 2011 27	Colegio Nacional Iquitos	2 – 1	Sporting Cristal	Iquitos
	Salazar 4', 29' (pen.)	Report	64' Alva	Stadium: Estadio Max Augustín; Attendance: 3,873; Referee: Víctor Hugo Rivera

20 November 2011 28	Sporting Cristal	0 – 4	Universidad San Martín	Lima
		Report	40' Marinelli; 67' (o.g.) Frezzotti; 76' (pen.) Arriola; 90' J. Sánchez	Stadium: Estadio San Martín de Porres; Attendance: 3,659; Referee: Manuel Garay

27 November 2011 29	León de Huánuco	1 – 1	Sporting Cristal	Huánuco
	Elías 44'	Report	62' Vílchez	Stadium: Estadio Heraclio Tapia; Attendance: 3,125; Referee: Miguel Santiváñez

4 December 2011 30	Sporting Cristal	3 – 0	Sport Huancayo	Lima
	Ximénez 17'; Espinoza 30' (pen.); Advíncula 51'	Report		Stadium: Estadio San Martín de Porres; Attendance: 4,777; Referee: Roberto Mauro

=== Torneo Intermedio ===
Win Draw Loss

==== First round ====
29 May 2011 First round	Coronel Bolognesi	0 – 1	Sporting Cristal	Tacna
		Report	Pando 83'	Stadium: Estadio Jorge Basadre; Referee: Roberto Mauro

==== Round of 16 ====
12 June 2011 1st Leg	Universidad San Martín	0 – 0	Sporting Cristal	Lima
	Nadaya (yellow card) 58'	Report	(yellow card) 41' Aquino	Stadium: San Martín de Porres; Referee: Alejandro Villanueva

18 June 2011 2nd Leg	Sporting Cristal	1 – 0	Universidad San Martín	Lima
	Quina 32'; Granda (yellow card) 56'; Lojas (yellow card) 87'	Report	(yellow card) 57' Silva; (yellow card) 59' Reyes	Stadium: San Martín de Porres; Referee: Iván Chang

==== Quarter-finals ====
26 June 2011 1st Leg	Alianza Unicachi	1 – 1	Sporting Cristal	Lima
	Shoro 26'	Report	(yellow card) 21' Frezzotti; (yellow card) 30' Casas 37' Pando	Stadium: San Martín de Porres; Referee: Diego Haro

29 June 2011 2nd Leg	Sporting Cristal	0 – 0 (5 – 4 p)	Alianza Unicachi	Lima
	Frezzotti (yellow card) 48'; Espinoza (yellow card) 89'	Report	(yellow card) 41' Yorkman; (yellow card) 54' Shoro; (yellow card) 68' L. Galliquio	Stadium: San Martín de Porres; Referee: Alberto Lozano
	Penalties
	Ximénez (penalty scored); Carranza (penalty scored); Palacios (penalty scored); W. Fernández (penalty scored); Espinoza (penalty scored)		(penalty scored) Montenegro; (penalty scored) Sanguinetti; (penalty scored) Chacaliaza; (penalty scored) Castillo; (penalty missed) Saldaña

==== Semi-finals ====
6 July 2011 1st Leg	José Gálvez	1 – 0	Sporting Cristal	Chimbote
	Salcedo 32', (yellow card) 80'	Report	(yellow card) 12' Carpio	Stadium: Estadio Manuel Rivera Sanchez; Referee: Henry Gambetta

13 July 2011 2nd Leg	Sporting Cristal	1 – 1	José Gálvez	Lima
	Alva 58'	Report	52' Silva	Stadium: San Martín de Porres; Referee: Georges Buckley

José Gálvez FBC won 2–1 on aggregate.

== Squad statistics ==
As of 31 December 2011

No.	Pos.	Name	Torneo Descentralizado		Torneo Intermedio		Total		Discipline	
No.	Pos.	Name	Apps	Goals	Apps	Goals	Apps	Goals	Yellow card	Red card
1	GK	(Peru) Erick Delgado	23	0	0	0	23	0	1	0
2	DF	(Peru) Wenceslao Fernández	4	0	6	0	10	0	2	1
3	DF	(Argentina) Germán Rivera	15	0	5	0	20	0	4	1
4	DF	(Peru) Walter Vílchez	27	1	0	0	27	1	2	0
5	MF	(Argentina) Alejandro Frezzotti	18	1	6	0	24	1	5	0
6	MF	(Peru) Gianfranco Espejo	6	0	1	0	7	0	1	0
7	MF	(Peru) Yancarlo Casas	13	0	3	0	16	0	4	0
8	DF	(Peru) Minzum Quina	15	0	6	1	21	1	3	1
9	FW	(Peru) José Shoro	7	2	0	0	7	2	2	0
10	MF	(Peru) Roberto Palacios	20	0	5	0	25	0	3	0
11	FW	(Peru) Iván Bulos	1	0	1	0	2	0	0	0
12	GK	(Peru) Manuel Heredia	7	0	6	0	13	0	2	0
13	DF	(Peru) Renzo Revoredo	12	0	0	0	12	0	2	0
14	DF	(Peru) Yoshimar Yotún	27	1	0	0	27	1	3	1
15	MF	(Peru) Alfonso García-Miró	0	0	0	0	0	0	0	0
16	DF	(Peru) Marcio Valverde	10	0	0	0	10	0	1	0
17	FW	(Peru) Luis Advíncula	29	2	0	0	29	2	7	0
18	FW	(Uruguay) Miguel Ximénez	24	6	4	0	28	6	3	0
19	FW	(Peru) Juan Diego González-Vigil	6	0	3	0	9	0	2	0
20	DF	(Peru) Juan Lojas	14	2	3	0	17	2	4	0
21	MF	(Mexico) Rodolfo Espinoza	13	2	2	0	15	2	1	0
22	DF	(Peru) Willy Rivas	6	0	0	0	6	0	1	0
23	FW	(Peru) Piero Alva	12	1	1	1	13	2	0	0
24	FW	(Peru) Junior Ross	10	0	2	0	12	0	0	0
25	GK	(Peru) Julio Aliaga	0	0	1	0	1	0	0	0
26	MF	(Peru) Tarek Carranza	10	0	5	0	15	0	2	0
27	MF	(Peru) Carlos Lobatón	25	2	0	0	25	2	5	2
28	DF	(Peru) José Granda	10	0	6	0	16	0	2	1
29	MF	(Peru) Claudio Torrejón	1	0	7	0	8	0	0	0
30	MF	(Peru) Diego Chávarri	7	2	3	0	10	2	3	1
	FW	(Peru) Cristian Adrianzén	0	0	2	0	2	0	0	0
	MF	(Peru) Pedro Aquino	0	0	5	0	5	0	1	0
	DF	(Peru) Wilson Vizconte	0	0	1	0	1	0	0	0
	GK	(Peru) Luis Ortiz	0	0	0	0	0	0	0	0
	FW	(Peru) Andy Pando [T]	13	1	5	2	18	3	0	1
	FW	(Peru) Héctor Cruz [T]	5	0	2	0	7	0	0	0
	DF	(Peru) Jean Pierre Cáncar [T]	4	0	1	0	5	0	2	0
	DF	(Paraguay) Carlos Espínola [T]	11	0	0	0	11	0	1	0
	MF	(Peru) Daniel Sánchez [T]	6	0	0	0	6	0	0	0
	FW	(Argentina) Luis Escalada [T]	7	2	0	0	7	2	0	0
	DF	(Peru) Martín Carpio [R]	0	0	1	0	1	0	1	0
	DF	(Peru) Irwing Acuña [R]	0	0	1	0	1	0	0	0
	DF	(Peru) Rodrigo Jaime [R]	0	0	1	0	1	0	0	0
	MF	(Peru) Jordan Ccapacca [R]	0	0	1	0	1	0	0	0
	MF	(Peru) Jairo Luy [R]	0	0	1	0	1	0	0	0
	MF	(Peru) Marlon Menéndez [R]	0	0	1	0	1	0	0	0

- [R] - Reserve team player from Sporting Cristal Reserves and Academy.
- [T] - Transferred out during the season. See 2011 Sporting Cristal season#Out

== See also ==
- Club Sporting Cristal
- 2011 Torneo Descentralizado
