= 2008 Sporting Cristal season =

Sporting Cristal
2008 season
- Chairman: François Mujica Serelle
- Manager: Juan Carlos Oblitas
- Stadium: San Martín de Porres, Lima
- Torneo Descentralizado: Torneo Apertura: Second (2°); Torneo Clausura: Second (2°); Aggregate Table: Second (2°); Third National (3°)
Home colours	Away colours	Third colours

The 2008 Sporting Cristal season were the Fifty-Third (53.º) of the club from its foundation in 1955, Fifty-Three (53) participations consecutives in the top-flight of Peruvian Primera División (of 92 Editions) with denomination Torneo Descentralizado. In Previous Season the club qualified as 10th Place of the 2007 Torneo Descentralizado.

Sporting Cristal were a of fourteen (14) clubs in the Forty-Third edition (43.º) Torneo Descentralizado, the competition most important of the Peruvian football. The club played the Peruvian Primera División.

== Players ==
Note: Flags indicate national team as defined under FIFA eligibility rules; some limited exceptions apply. Players may hold more than one non-FIFA nationality.

No.	Pos.	Nation	Player
1	GK	PER	Erick Delgado
4	MF	PER	César Ruiz
5	MF	ARG	Franco Razzotti
6	MF	PER	Antonio Lizarbe
8	MF	PER	Renzo Sheput
9	FW	PER	Paul Cominges
11	FW	BRA	Wésley Brasilia
13	FW	PER	Jesús Cabrera
14	DF	PER	Marcos Delgado
15	DF	PER	Gianfranco Espejo
17	MF	PER	Manuel Tejada
18	FW	URU	Miguel Ximénez

No.	Pos.	Nation	Player
19	DF	PER	Luis Hernández
20	DF	PER	Víctor Anchante
21	DF	PER	Christian Ramos
22	DF	PER	Amilton Prado
24	DF	PER	José Mesarina
25	GK	PER	Julio Aliaga
26	DF	PER	Juan Arce
27	MF	PER	Carlos Lobatón
30	FW	PER	Janio Posito
—	GK	PER	Manuel Heredia
—	DF	PER	Wenceslao Fernandez
—	DF	PER	Diego Minaya
—	MF	PER	Roberto Palacios

== Competitions ==
=== Overall ===
Competition	Started round	Final position / round	First match	Last match
Torneo Descentralizado	Torneo Apertura	3rd	Feb 16	Dec 13

=== Torneo Descentralizado ===
==== Torneo Apertura ====
Pos	Team	Pld	W	D	L	GF	GA	GD	Pts
1	Universitario	26	16	7	3	40	21	+19	55
2	Sporting Cristal	26	15	4	7	46	32	+14	49
3	Universidad San Martín	26	11	10	5	40	20	+20	43

==== Torneo Clausura ====
Pos	Team	Pld	W	D	L	GF	GA	GD	Pts
1	Universidad San Martín	26	15	6	5	41	20	+21	51
2	Sporting Cristal	26	14	3	9	36	25	+11	45
3	Sport Áncash	26	12	7	7	39	29	+10	43

==== Aggregate table ====
Pos	Team	Pld	W	D	L	GF	GA	GD	Pts	Qualification
1	Universidad San Martín	52	26	16	10	81	42	+39	94	
2	Sporting Cristal	52	29	7	16	82	57	+25	94	2009 Copa Libertadores First stage
3	Universitario	52	24	17	11	71	53	+18	89	

== See also ==
- Club Sporting Cristal
- 2008 Torneo Descentralizado
