= Amilton =

Amilton may refer to:

- Amilton Prado (born 1979), Peruvian football defender
- Amílton (footballer, born 1981), Brazilian football striker
- Amilton (footballer, born 1989), Brazilian football right winger

== See also ==
- Hamilton (name)
