= Cancar =

Cancar is a surname with multiple origins. Notable people with the surname include:

- Jean Pierre Cáncar (born 1987), Peruvian footballer
- Nizam Čančar (born 1975), Bosnian Paralympic volleyball player
- Phillip Cancar (born 2001), Australian footballer
- Vlatko Čančar (born 1997), Slovene basketball player
