= José Mesarina =

Peruvian footballer (born 1988)

Personal information
- Full name: José Manuel Mesarina Mayorga
- Date of birth: 15 November 1988 (age 37)
- Place of birth: Callao, Peru
- Height: 1.70 m (5 ft 7 in)
- Position: Right back

Youth career
- Alianza Lima

Senior career*
| Years | Team | Apps | (Gls) |
| 2007 | Alianza Lima | 0 | (0) |
| 2007–2008 | Sporting Cristal | 6 | (0) |
| 2009–2010 | José Gálvez | 37 | (2) |
| 2011 | Alianza Lima | 1 | (0) |
| 2012–2013 | José Gálvez | 59 | (3) |
| 2014 | Defensor San Alejandro | 19 | (1) |
| 2015 | Alianza Atlético | 6 | (0) |
| 2015–2016 | Los Caimanes | 14 | (0) |
| 2017 | Defensor La Bocana | 25 | (6) |
| 2018 | Cienciano | 9 | (2) |
- * Club domestic league appearances and goals as of 4 March 2019

José Manuel Mesarina Mayorga (born 15 November 1988) is a Peruvian footballer who plays primarily as a right back. He most recently played for Cienciano in the Torneo Descentralizado.

== Club career ==
José Mesarina was promoted from Alianza Lima's youth team to the first team in 2007. However, he did not make a league appearance for Alianza that season.

Then later that same year in July, Mesarina joined rivals Sporting Cristal on a free transfer. There he made his league debut in the Torneo Descentralizado on 20 September 2007 in a derby match against his former side Alianza Lima. He played from the start and was later replaced for Damián Ismodes in the 68th minute of the match, which finished in a 1–2 defeat at home.
