= Luis Advíncula =

Peruvian footballer (born 1990)

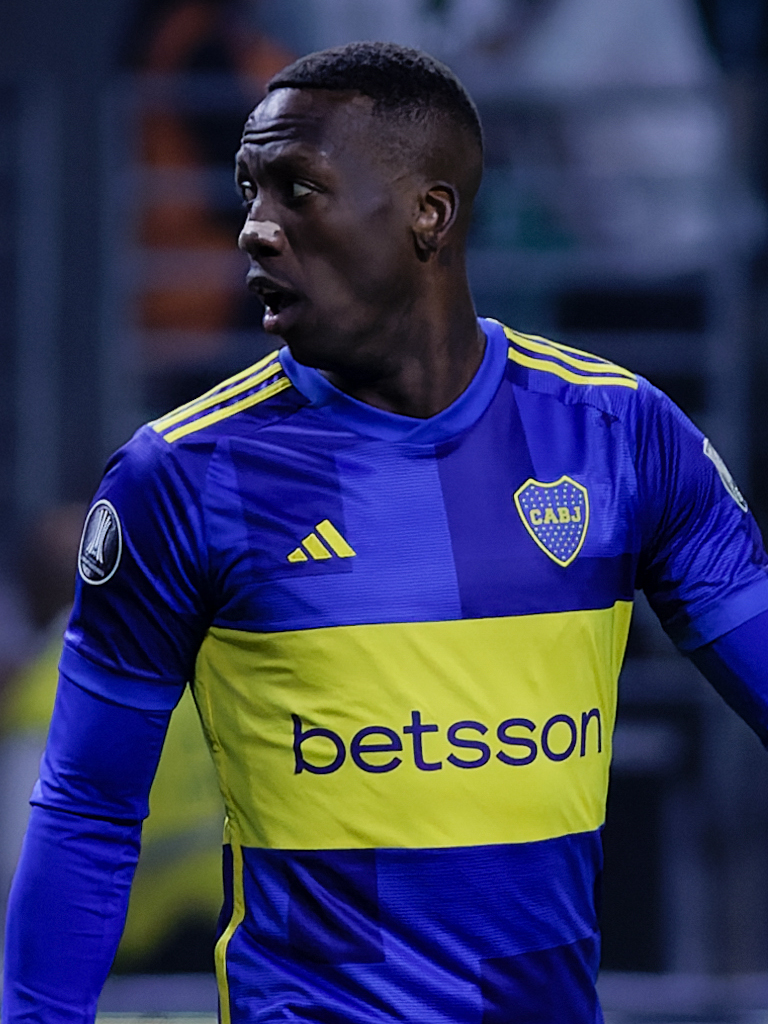
- Advíncula with Boca Juniors in 2023

Personal information
- Full name: Luis Jan Piers Advíncula Castrillón
- Date of birth: 2 March 1990 (age 36)
- Place of birth: Chincha, Peru
- Height: 1.80 m (5 ft 11 in)
- Positions: Full-back; winger

Team information
- Current team: Alianza Lima
- Number: 17

Youth career
- 2007–2008: Esther Grande Bentin
- 2008: Juan Aurich

Senior career*
Years	Team	Apps	(Gls)
2009–2010	Juan Aurich	31	(1)
2010–2012	Sporting Cristal	91	(8)
2012–2013	Tavriya Simferopol	0	(0)
2012	→ Sporting Cristal (loan)	9	(0)
2013–2015	TSG Hoffenheim	2	(0)
2013	→ Ponte Preta (loan)	4	(0)
2014	→ Sporting Cristal (loan)	10	(2)
2014−2015	→ Vitória Setúbal (loan)	26	(0)
2015–2016	Bursaspor	12	(0)
2016	→ Newell's Old Boys (loan)	29	(1)
2017–2019	Tigres UANL	9	(0)
2017–2018	→ Lobos BUAP (loan)	19	(2)
2018–2019	→ Rayo Vallecano (loan)	28	(1)
2019–2021	Rayo Vallecano	72	(2)
2021–2025	Boca Juniors	123	(2)
2026–	Alianza Lima	0	(0)

International career^{‡}
2009	Peru U20	2	(0)
2010–	Peru	130	(2)
Medal record
Men's football
Representing Peru
Copa América
Runner-up	2019 Brazil
Third place	2011 Argentina
Third place	2015 Chile
- * Club domestic league appearances and goals as of 17:16, 6 December 2025 (UTC) ‡ National team caps and goals as of 22:45, 9 September 2025 (UTC)

Luis Jan Piers Advíncula Castrillón (Spanish pronunciation: [ˈlwis aðˈβiŋkula]; born 2 March 1990) is a Peruvian professional footballer who plays for Peruvian Primera División club Alianza Lima and the Peru national team. A quick and offensive right-back, he can also play as a right winger.

== Club career ==
=== Early career ===
Advíncula started his career in the lower divisions of Juan Aurich and made his professional debut for the club in 2009. He was transferred in January 2010 to Sporting Cristal, where he made ninety-one appearances between 2010 and 2012.

=== SC Tavriya ===
On 17 April 2012, the Houston Dynamo from the United States submitted a bid for Advíncula, but the deal fell apart at the last minute. On 19 July 2012, his move to SC Tavriya Simferopol from Ukraine was confirmed, but he returned to Sporting Cristal after only one month because the club did not meet the quota for Advíncula.

=== TSG 1899 Hoffenheim ===
On 5 January 2013, Advíncula signed a four-year contract with German club TSG 1899 Hoffenheim of the Bundesliga.

==== Loan to Ponte Preta ====
Advíncula joined Brazilian club Ponte Preta on a six-month loan on 10 July 2013, being recommended to the club by manager Paulo César Carpegiani. Although he was expected to be the starting right-back after the departure of Cicinho, Advíncula only managed to make four appearances for the club, as he was usually the third-choice on the right side of the defence, behind Artur and Régis. He fell out of favor with manager Jorginho, who called Advíncula "technically weak". He was released from the club on 29 October.

==== Loan to Vitória de Setúbal ====
On 19 August 2014, he joined Vitória de Setúbal on a one-year loan.

=== Rayo Vallecano ===
On 29 July 2018, Advíncula returned to Europe, this time to La Liga's Rayo Vallecano on loan for one year. A year later, it was revealed that club had decided to activate the player’s option to buy.

After playing in the division play-offs, on 20 June 2021, Rayo was promoted to the first division of La Liga with Advíncula as a substitute.

=== Boca Juniors ===
In July 2021, Advinicula was transferred to Boca Juniors, after the club reached an agreement with Rayo. He scored Boca's only goal in the 2023 Copa Libertadores final that they ended up losing 2–1 after extra time. In his four years at the club, he had won the Argentine championship in 2022, the Argentine Cup in 2020, and the Professional League Cup in 2022.

=== Alianza Lima ===
In January 2026, Advíncula returned to Peru, signing with Alianza Lima.

== International career ==
Advíncula has been capped for the U-20 Peruvian national team where he played in the South American U-20 in 2009.

His senior team debut was on 4 September 2010, in a friendly against Canada. His second match was against Jamaica in another friendly match on 7 September of that same year. He was also summoned by coach Sergio Markarián to play the Copa America 2011 in Argentina.

Advíncula also took part in the starting eleven in the second leg of the intercontinental play-off against New Zealand on 15 November 2017. He played a crucial part in the outcome of the 2–0 victory over New Zealand, helping Peru qualify for the 2018 FIFA World Cup, Peru's first World Cup since 1982.

In May 2018, he was named in Peru's final 23-man squad for the 2018 FIFA World Cup in Russia. He played all three group matches as his side were knocked out of the tournament.

On 9 September 2018, he scored his first international goal in a 2–1 friendly loss to Germany.

On 13 June 2022, after missing a penalty in the decisive World Cup playoff match against Australia, he posted on social media an announcement of his retirement from international football. Despite this, he continued to play for the national team, being named in the squad for the 2024 Copa América.

== Career statistics ==
=== Club ===
As of match played 6 December 2025

Appearances and goals by club, season and competition
Club	Season	League			National cup (Note: Includes Copa do Brasil, Torneo del Inca, Taça de Portugal, Turkish Cup, Copa Argentina)		Continental		Other		Total	
Club	Season	Division	Apps	Goals	Apps	Goals	Apps	Goals	Apps	Goals	Apps	Goals
Juan Aurich	2009	Peruvian Primera División	31	1	—		—		—		31	1
Sporting Cristal	2010	Peruvian Primera División	41	6	—		—		—		41	6
Sporting Cristal	2011	Peruvian Primera División	29	2	—		—		—		29	2
Sporting Cristal	2012	Peruvian Primera División	21	0	—		—		—		21	0
Sporting Cristal	Total		91	8	—		—		—		91	8
SC Tavriya	2012–13	Ukrainian Premier League	0	0	0	0	—		—		0	0
Sporting Cristal (loan)	2012	Peruvian Primera División	9	0	—		—		—		9	0
TSG Hoffenheim	2012–13	Bundesliga	2	0	0	0	—		0	0	2	0
Ponte Preta (loan)	2013	Série A	4	0	1	0	1 (Note: Appearance in Copa Sudamericana)	0	—		6	0
Sporting Cristal (loan)	2014	Peruvian Primera División	10	2	11	1	1 (Note: Appearance(s) in Copa Libertadores)	0	—		22	3
Vitória de Setúbal (loan)	2014–15	Primeira Liga	26	0	2	0	—		5 (Note: Appearances in Taça da Liga)	0	33	0
Bursaspor	2015–16	Süper Lig	12	0	1	0	—		1 (Note: Appearance in Turkish Super Cup)	0	14	0
Newell's Old Boys (loan)	2016	Argentine Primera División	15	1	1	0	—		—		16	1
Newell's Old Boys (loan)	2016–17	Argentine Primera División	14	0	1	0	—		—		15	0
Newell's Old Boys (loan)	Total		29	1	2	0	—		—		31	1
Tigres UANL	2016–17	Liga MX	9	0	0	0	5 (Note: Appearances in CONCACAF Champions Cup)	0	0	0	14	0
Lobos BUAP (loan)	2017–18	Liga MX	28	2	0	0	—		—		28	2
Rayo Vallecano (loan)	2018–19	La Liga	28	1	1	0	—		—		29	1
Rayo Vallecano	2019–20	Segunda División	35	1	1	0	—		—		36	1
Rayo Vallecano	2020–21	Segunda División	37	1	3	0	—		2 (Note: Appearances in Segunda División promotion play-offs)	0	42	1
Rayo Vallecano	Total		100	3	5	0	—		2	0	107	3
Boca Juniors	2021	Argentine Primera División	13	0	4	0	0	0	0	0	17	0
Boca Juniors	2022	Argentine Primera División	34	1	1	0	7	0	1 (Note: Appearance in Trofeo de Campeones de la Superliga Argentina)	0	43	1
Boca Juniors	2023	Argentine Primera División	25	0	2	0	12	4	2 (Note: One appearance in Supercopa Internacional, one appearance in Supercopa Argentina)	0	41	4
Boca Juniors	2024	Argentine Primera División	32	0	2	0	8 (Note: Appearances in Copa Sudamericana)	0	0	0	42	0
Boca Juniors	2025	Argentine Primera División	19	1	1	0	1	0	3 (Note: Appearances in FIFA Club World Cup)	0	24	1
Boca Juniors	Total		123	2	10	0	28	4	6	0	167	6
Career total			474	19	32	1	35	4	14	0	555	24

=== International ===
As of match played 9 September 2025

Appearances and goals by national team and year
National team	Year	Apps	Goals
Peru	2010	5	0
Peru	2011	12	0
Peru	2012	5	0
Peru	2013	9	0
Peru	2014	9	0
Peru	2015	14	0
Peru	2016	3	0
Peru	2017	4	0
Peru	2018	13	1
Peru	2019	15	0
Peru	2020	4	0
Peru	2021	9	1
Peru	2022	6	0
Peru	2023	6	0
Peru	2024	10	0
Peru	2025	6	0
Total		130	2

As of 8 June 2021.
Scores and results list Peru's goal tally first, score column indicates score after each Advíncula goal.

List of international goals scored by Luis Advíncula
No.	Date	Venue	Opponent	Score	Result	Competition
1	9 September 2018	Rhein-Neckar-Arena, Sinsheim, Germany	Germany	1–0	1–2	Friendly
2	8 June 2021	Estadio Rodrigo Paz Delgado, Quito, Ecuador	Ecuador	2–0	2–1	2022 FIFA World Cup qualification

== Personal life ==
Advíncula's father was also a football player with a career in Peruvian football.

In December 2024, Advíncula became a naturalized citizen of Argentina while playing for Boca. His naturalization allowed Boca to vacate a quota for foreign players in the Argentine club.

== Honours ==
Sporting Cristal

- Torneo Descentralizado (2): 2012, 2014

Boca Juniors

- Primera División: 2022
- Copa Argentina: 2019–20
- Copa de la Liga Profesional: 2022
- Supercopa Argentina: 2022
- Copa Libertadores runner-up: 2023

Peru

- Copa América runner-up: 2019; third-place: 2011, 2015

== See also ==
- List of men's footballers with 100 or more international caps
