= Luis Collantes =

Peruvian footballer (born 1982)

Personal information
- Full name: Luis Miguel Collantes
- Date of birth: 12 November 1982 (age 44)
- Place of birth: Miraflores, Peru
- Position: Midfielder

Senior career*
Years	Team	Apps	(Gls)
2005	Universitario		
2005–2006	Unión Huaral		
2007	Total Clean	3	(0)
2007–2008	Sport Áncash	50	(2)
2009	Cienciano	9	(0)
2010	José Gálvez	35	(1)
Total		107	(3)
- * Club domestic league appearances and goals

Luis Miguel Collantes (born 12 November 1982) is a Peruvian former professional footballer who played as a midfielder.

== Career ==
Born in Miraflores, Collantes played for Universitario, Unión Huaral, Total Clean, Sport Áncash, Cienciano and José Gálvez.
