= Yoshimar Yotún =

Peruvian footballer (born 1990)

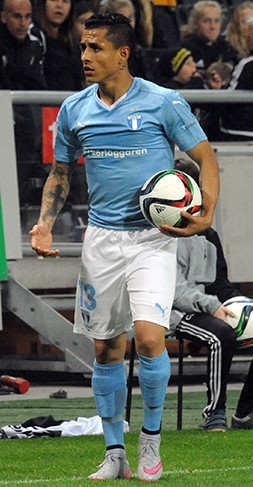
- Yotún playing for Malmö FF in 2015

Personal information
- Full name: Víctor Yoshimar Yotún Flores
- Date of birth: 7 April 1990 (age 36)
- Place of birth: Callao, Peru
- Height: 1.70 m (5 ft 7 in)
- Positions: Defensive midfielder; left-back; left winger

Team information
- Current team: Sporting Cristal
- Number: 19

Youth career
- 1997–2002: Academia Cantolao
- 2003–2004: Circolo Sp. Italiano
- 2005–2006: Deportivo Real FC
- 2007: Sporting Cristal

Senior career*
Years	Team	Apps	(Gls)
2008–2014	Sporting Cristal	147	(8)
2008	→ José Gálvez (loan)	28	(3)
2013	→ Vasco da Gama (loan)	23	(0)
2015–2017	Malmö FF	58	(3)
2017–2018	Orlando City	32	(5)
2019–2021	Cruz Azul	85	(4)
2022–	Sporting Cristal	86	(14)

International career^{‡}
2011–	Peru	139	(8)
Medal record
Men's football
Representing Peru
Copa América
Runner-up	2019 Brazil
Third place	2011 Argentina
Third place	2015 Chile
- * Club domestic league appearances and goals as of 19 September 2026 ‡ National team caps and goals as of 14 November 2026

Víctor Yoshimar Yotún Flores (Spanish pronunciation: [ˈbiɣtoɾ ʝoʃiˈmaɾ ʝoˈtuɱ ˈflores]; born 7 April 1990) is a Peruvian professional footballer who plays for Peruvian Liga 1 club Sporting Cristal and the Peru national team. He can play as a left back, left winger, or defensive midfielder. He is Peru's most capped player with 139 appearances.

== Club career ==
=== Early career ===
Yotún first began by playing at the age of 7 in the youth academy Academia Deportiva Cantolao until the age of 12. Then he joined the youth divisions of Circolo Sportivo Italiano for two seasons. Then the following years he was in the youth divisions of Deportivo Real FC, alongside Manuel Tejada. In 2007, he transferred to one of Peru's largest clubs, Sporting Cristal, and played in their youth team.

=== José Gálvez FBC ===
In January 2008 he was loaned out to José Gálvez FBC for the 2008 Descentralizado season. There Yotún made his professional debut on 5 March 2008 in the Torneo Descentralizado in an away league match against Coronel Bolognesi FC. He entered the match in the 46th minute for Renzo Guevara, and the match finished in a 1–1 draw. Yotún scored his first official goal on 9 March 2008 in a league match at home against Atlético Minero, which resulted in 1–0 win for his club. He played his last game for José Gálvez FBC on 14 December 2008 in the last fixture of the season, which finished in a 2–2 draw at home against Universidad San Martin. He made a total of 28 league appearances and scored 3 goals in his first season in the Descentralizado. This contributed to his club José Gálvez avoiding relegation that season by finishing in 9th place, just 5 points above the relegation zone.

=== Sporting Cristal ===
In January 2009 Yotún returned to Sporting Cristal for the 2009 Descentralizado season. He made his official debut for Sporting Cristal on 9 May 2009 in a league match at home against FBC Melgar. Making his debut at the San Martín de Porres Stadium, he entered the match in the 46th minute replacing Yancarlo Casas, and the match finished in a 2–1 win for Melgar.

Yotún played his 100th Descentralizado match for Cristal on 27 May 2012 in Round 15 away to Juan Aurich. He was also handed the captain's armband after Carlos Lobaton's red card in the 61st minute, but his side could not score the equaliser as the match finished in a 1–0 win for Aurich.

=== Malmö FF ===
On 27 January 2015 Swedish champions Malmö FF announced that they had signed Yotún on a three-year contract. He arrived in Malmö as a left back, where he played for the 2015 season. After becoming the third choice left back behind newly arrived Behrang Safari and Pa Konate during the 2016 season, Yotún was played at various midfield positions, where he excelled. Yotún emerged as a key player during the first half of the 2017 season, and was voted Malmö FF player of the month by the supporters in July.

=== Orlando City SC ===
Yotún signed for Orlando City of Major League Soccer on 4 August 2017. He made his debut on 13 August in a 3–1 defeat to New York Red Bulls. On 28 September, Yotún scored his first goal for Orlando in a 6–1 win over New England Revolution, a game in which he also registered two assists. Yotún was selected as an All-Star in 2018.

=== Cruz Azul ===
On 27 December 2018, Yotún was sold to Cruz Azul of Liga MX for $4 million.

=== Return to Sporting Cristal ===
On 8 March 2022, Yotún returned to Sporting Cristal.

== International career ==
=== 2011–13: Beginnings, first Copa América, and 2014 FIFA World Cup qualification ===
In 2011, Yotun's impressive performances for Sporting Cristal convinced the new Peru national team coach Sergio Markarián to call him up for the 2011 edition of Kirin Cup. Against Japan, he made his national team debut substituting Jesus Rabanal in the 62nd minute. Though on 9 September 2013 against Uruguay for the fight for 5th place in the CONMEBOL World Cup Qualification group, Yotun's performance was heavily criticized by Peruvians because of his expulsion during the game, which many argued had cost Peru's qualification into the tournament.

=== 2015–16: Second and third Copa América ===
In 2015, Yotun was part of the team that finished 3rd in Copa América. He also featured in all three group games of the 2016 Centenario edition but was suspended on yellow card accumulation for Peru's quarter-finals loss to Colombia.

=== 2018: First FIFA World Cup ===
Yotun was part of the team that qualified for the 2018 World Cup after Peru finished 5th in CONMEBOL qualifying and beat New Zealand in a play-off. It was the first time the country had qualified in 36 years. He made the 23-man squad that traveled to Russia and featured in all three group games as Peru finished third in the group.

=== 2021: Fifth Copa América and 100th cap ===
On 20 June 2021, he played his 100th match for Peru in a 2–1 win over Colombia in the 2021 Copa América.

== Career statistics ==
=== Club ===
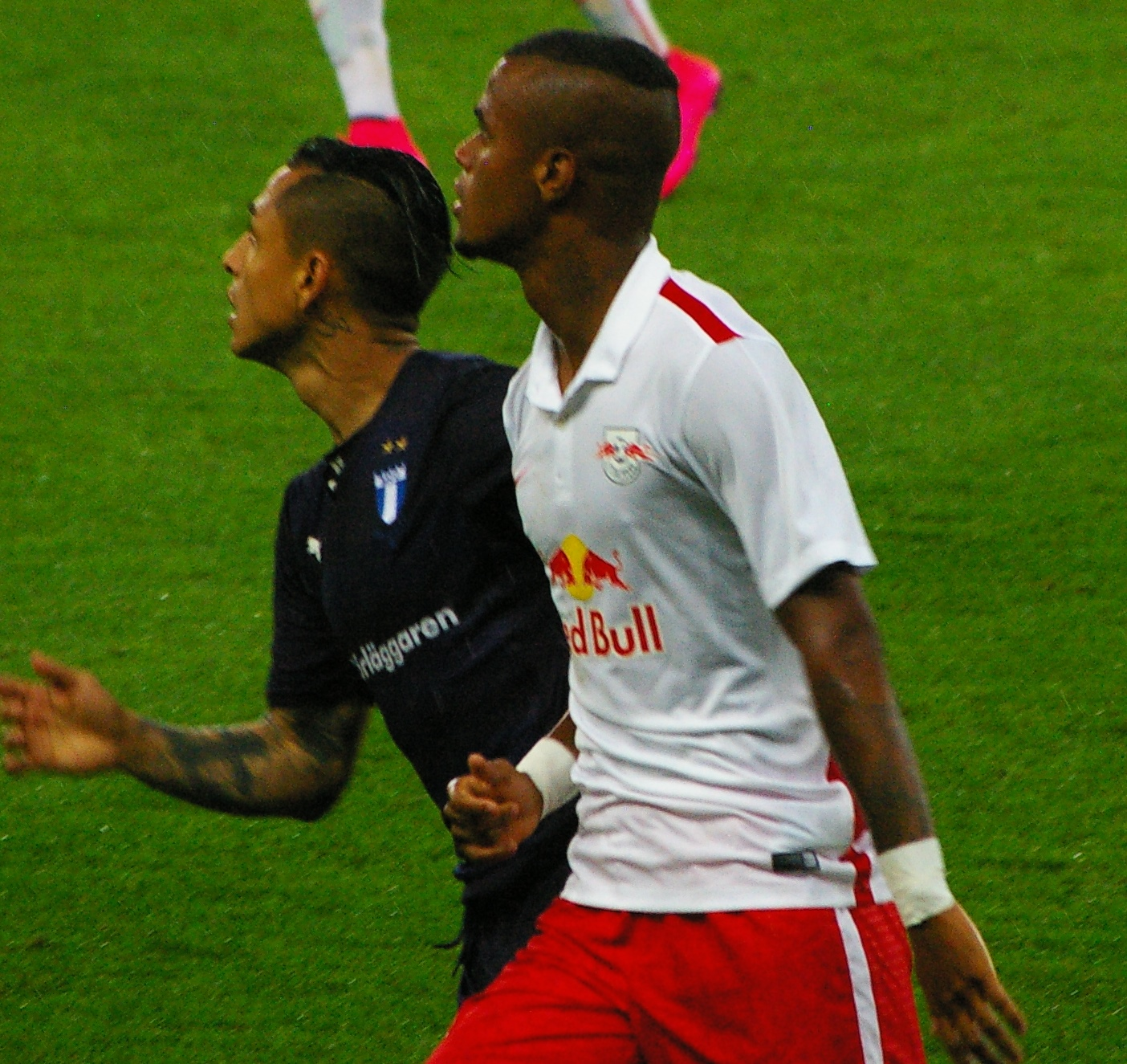
Yotún in a Champions League qualifier against Red Bull Salzburg in 2015

As of match played 19 September 2026

Appearances and goals by club, season and competition
Club	Season	League			Cup		League Cup		Continental		Total	
Club	Season	Division	Apps	Goals	Apps	Goals	Apps	Goals	Apps	Goals	Apps	Goals
José Gálvez (loan)	2008	Liga 1	28	3	0	0	—		—		28	3
Sporting Cristal	2009	Liga 1	23	0	0	0	—		—		23	0
Sporting Cristal	2010	Liga 1	36	4	0	0	—		—		36	4
Sporting Cristal	2011	Liga 1	27	1	0	0	—		—		27	1
Sporting Cristal	2012	Liga 1	35	2	0	0	—		—		35	2
Sporting Cristal	2014	Liga 1	26	1	10	1	—		2	0	38	2
Sporting Cristal	Total		147	8	10	1	—		2	0	159	9
Vasco da Gama (loan)	2013	Série A	27 (Note: Includes four appearances in Campeonato Carioca)	0	4	0	—		—		31	0
Malmö FF	2015	Allsvenskan	24	1	4	0	—		10	0	38	1
Malmö FF	2016	Allsvenskan	19	0	5	0	—		—		24	0
Malmö FF	2017	Allsvenskan	15	2	0	0	—		2	0	17	2
Malmö FF	Total		58	3	9	0	—		12	0	79	3
Orlando City	2017	MLS	10	1	0	0	—		—		10	1
Orlando City	2018	MLS	22	4	0	0	—		—		22	4
Orlando City	Total		32	5	0	0	—		0	0	32	5
Cruz Azul	2018–19	Liga MX	16	1	1	1	—		—		17	2
Cruz Azul	2019–20	Liga MX	17	1	1 (Note: Appearance in Supercopa MX)	0	—		3 (Note: Appearances in Leagues Cup)	1	21	2
Cruz Azul	2020–21	Liga MX	39	1	0	0	—		2	1	41	2
Cruz Azul	2021–22	Liga MX	13	1	0	0	—		7 (Note: One appearance in Campeón de Campeones)	1	20	2
Cruz Azul	Total		85	4	2	1	—		11	3	99	8
Sporting Cristal	2022	Liga 1	17	2	0	0	—		5	0	22	2
Sporting Cristal	2023	Liga 1	25	5	0	0	—		10 (Note: Eight appearances in Copa Libertadores and two in Copa Sudamericana)	1	35	6
Sporting Cristal	2024	Liga 1	8	3	0	0	—		2 (Note: Appearances in Copa Libertadores)	0	10	3
Sporting Cristal	2025	Liga 1	13	1	0	0	—		0	0	13	1
Sporting Cristal	2026	Liga 1	23	6	—		2	0	12 (Note: Ten appearances and three goals in Copa Libertadores, two appearances in Copa Sudamericana)	3	37	9
Sporting Cristal	Total		86	17	0	0	2	0	29	7	115	21
Career total			463	40	25	2	2	0	55	7	545	49

=== International ===
As of match played 14 November 2026.

Appearances and goals by national team and year
National team	Year	Apps	Goals
Peru	2011	12	0
Peru	2012	11	0
Peru	2013	8	1
Peru	2014	8	0
Peru	2015	11	0
Peru	2016	10	1
Peru	2017	9	0
Peru	2018	13	0
Peru	2019	10	1
Peru	2020	4	0
Peru	2021	16	2
Peru	2022	6	2
Peru	2023	10	1
Peru	2024	0	0
Peru	2025	2	0
Peru	2026	9	0
Total		139	8

As of match played 21 November 2023
Scores and results list Peru's goal tally first, score column indicates score after each Yotún goal.

List of international goals scored by Yoshimar Yotún
No.	Date	Venue	Cap	Opponent	Score	Result	Competition
1	15 October 2013	Estadio Nacional, Lima, Peru	31	Bolivia	1–0	1–1	2014 FIFA World Cup qualification
2	28 May 2016	Memorial Stadium, Seattle, United States	53	El Salvador	3–1	3–1	Friendly
3	3 July 2019	Arena do Grêmio, Porto Alegre, Brazil	90	Chile	2–0	3–0	2019 Copa América
4	2 July 2021	Estádio Olímpico Pedro Ludovico, Goiânia, Brazil	103	Paraguay	3–2	3–3	2021 Copa América
5	9 July 2021	Estádio Nacional Mané Garrincha, Brasília, Brazil	105	Colombia	1–0	2–3	2021 Copa América
6	20 January 2022	Estadio Nacional, Lima, Peru	113	Jamaica	3–0	3–0	Friendly
7	29 March 2022	Estadio Nacional, Lima, Peru	117	Paraguay	2–0	2–0	2022 FIFA World Cup qualification
8	21 November 2023	Estadio Nacional, Lima, Peru	128	Venezuela	1–0	1–1	2026 FIFA World Cup qualification

== Honours ==
Sporting Cristal

- Torneo Descentralizado: 2012, 2014
- Copa de la Liga: 2026

Malmö FF

- Allsvenskan: 2016, 2017

Cruz Azul

- Liga MX: Guardianes 2021
- Campeón de Campeones: 2021
- Supercopa MX: 2019
- Leagues Cup: 2019

Peru

- Copa América: runner-up 2019; third place 2011, 2015, fourth place 2021

Individual

- Torneo Descentralizado Left back of the Year: 2009
- MLS All-Star: 2018
- Copa América Team of the Tournament: 2021

== See also ==
- List of men's footballers with 100 or more international caps
