= Yancarlo Casas =

Peruvian footballer (born 1977)

Personal information
- Full name: Yancarlo Victorio Casas Acosta
- Date of birth: 15 July 1977 (age 49)
- Place of birth: Lima, Peru
- Height: 1.72 m (5 ft 8 in)
- Position: Defensive midfielder

Youth career
- –2003: Universitario de Deportes

Senior career*
Years	Team	Apps	(Gls)
2003	Universitario de Deportes		
2003	Estudiantes de Medicina		
2004	Deportivo Municipal		
2005–2006	FBC Melgar		
2007–2008	Coronel Bolognesi	45	(2)
2009–2011	Sporting Cristal	82	(1)
2012–2013	Cienciano	37	(0)
2013–2014	Huancayo	22	(0)
Total		186	(3)
- * Club domestic league appearances and goals

Yancarlo Victorio Casas Acosta (born 15 July 1981) is a Peruvian former professional footballer who played as a defensive midfielder.

== Club career ==
Casas was formed as footballer in the youth academy of Universitario de Deportes. He made his debut in the 2003 Torneo Descentralizado season. Then later that season he had a short spell with Ica based club Estudiantes de Medicina. The following season Casas returned to the capital and played the 2004 season in the Peruvian Second Division with Club Deportivo Municipal.

Then in 2005 Yancarlo returned the First Division by joining Arequipa club FBC Melgar. Casas scored his first goal in the Descentralizado on 12 November 2005 at home in the Estadio Monumental Virgen de Chapi against Sport Boys in the 2005 Clausura, which resulted in 1–0 win for his side.

In 2007, he joined Tacna based club Coronel Bolognesi. Under the command of manager Freddy García, Yancarlo made his debut for Bolognesi FC in Round 5 of the 2007 Apertura in the 3–0 away loss to Total Clean FBC. He made 21 appearances and managed to score two goals in the league that season. The following season he made 24 league appearances in the 2008 Torneo Descentralizado, which was his last season with Bolo.

In January 2009, Casas joined Peruvian club Sporting Cristal for the start of the 2009 season. He made 30 league appearances in his first season with his side finishing 10th in the Aggregate table that season. In the following 2010 season Casas played 39 matches and scored one goal, but still Sporting Cristal finished in mid-table 7th place. In his last season Yancarlo fell out of favor with the manager at the time Juan Reynoso and only managed to play in 13 league matches and 3 domestic cup matches in the 2011 season.

On 15 January 2012 Casas joined Cusco club Cienciano for the 2012 season.

== Honours ==
Coronel Bolognesi

- Torneo Clausura: 2007
