= Franco Navarro Jr. =

Argentine-Peruvian footballer (born 1990)

Franco Navarro
Personal information
- Full name: Franco Enrique Navarro Mandayo
- Date of birth: October 24, 1990 (age 36)
- Place of birth: Santa Fe, Argentina
- Height: 1.78 m (5 ft 10 in)
- Position: Forward

Team information
- Current team: Alianza Lima
- Number: 22

Youth career
- 2005–2007: Univ. San Martín
- 200?–2008: Cienciano

Senior career*
Years	Team	Apps	(Gls)
2008	Cienciano	11	(2)
2009	Sporting Cristal	0	(0)
2009	Total Chalaco	2	(0)
2010	Sporting Cristal	0	(0)
2010–2011	Cienciano	16	(2)
2011	Independiente	0	(0)
2012–	Alianza Lima	4	(0)
- * Club domestic league appearances and goals as of 20 January 2012

Franco Enrique Navarro Mandayo (born 24 October 1990) is an Argentine-born Peruvian footballer who plays as a striker for Alianza Lima in the Torneo Descentralizado.

== Club career ==
Franco Navarro Manadayo started playing with Academia Tito Drago in 2003. Between 2005 and 2007 he was part of Universidad San Martín de Porres's youth teams. He then joined Cienciano's youth squad. He made his debut in the Torneo Descentralizado with Cienciano in 2008.

He transferred to Sporting Cristal for the 2009 season but was released soon after.

== Personal life ==
He was born in Santa Fe, Argentina and is the son of Franco Navarro and holds dual Argentine-Peruvian nationality.
