= Luis Daniel Hernández =

Peruvian footballer (born 1977)

Personal information
- Full name: Luis Daniel Hernández Alfaro
- Date of birth: 20 December 1977 (age 48)
- Place of birth: Lima, Peru
- Height: 1.75 m (5 ft 9 in)
- Position: Left back

Team information
- Current team: Inti Gas Deportes

Youth career
- 1997–2003: Unión Huaral

Senior career*
Years	Team	Apps	(Gls)
2003–2004	Unión Huaral		
2005–2006	Universitario de Deportes		
2007–2008	Sporting Cristal	82	(2)
2009	Juan Aurich	14	(0)
2010	Sport Huancayo	34	(2)
2011	Colegio Nacional Iquitos	28	(0)
2012–	Inti Gas Deportes	6	(0)

International career^{‡}
2005–2006	Peru	6	(0)
- * Club domestic league appearances and goals as of 28 August 2012 ‡ National team caps and goals as of 16:29, 9 April 2009 (UTC)

Luis Daniel Hernández Alfaro (born 20 December 1977) is a Peruvian footballer. He currently plays for Inti Gas Deportes, as a left back.

== Club career ==
Hernández used to play for Universitario de Deportes, Sporting Cristal and Unión Huaral.

== International career ==
Hernández has made six appearances for the Peru national football team.

== Honours ==
=== Club ===
Unión Huaral:

- Peruvian Second Division: 2002
