= Amílton (footballer, born 1981) =

Brazilian footballer

Personal information
- Full name: Amílton Jesus dos Santos
- Date of birth: August 13, 1981 (age 45)
- Place of birth: Jequié, Brazil
- Height: 1.76 m (5 ft 9 in)
- Position: Striker

Team information
- Current team: Uberlândia

Youth career
- 2001–2002: Poções-BA

Senior career*
Years	Team	Apps	(Gls)
2003	Poções-BA		
2004	Guaratinguetá		
2005	CSE-AL		
2007–2008	Atlético Mineiro	4	(0)
2007	→ CRB (loan)		
2007	→ Marília (loan)		
2008	→ América (MG) (loan)		
2009–2010	Ipatinga	43	(7)
2011	Democrata		
2011	CRB		
2012–?	Uberlândia		
- * Club domestic league appearances and goals

Amílton Jesus dos Santos (born August 13, 1981), or simply Amílton, is a Brazilian former professional footballer who played as a striker.
