= Víctor Anchante =

Peruvian footballer (born 1979)

Personal information
- Full name: Victor Raul Anchante Licht
- Date of birth: August 26, 1979 (age 47)
- Place of birth: Lima, Peru
- Height: 1.81 m (5 ft 11 in)
- Position: Defender

Team information
- Current team: Sporting Cristal
- Number: 5

Senior career*
Years	Team	Apps	(Gls)
2001–2002	Sport Coopsol		
2003	Sporting Cristal		
2004	USMP		
2005	Coronel Bolognesi		
2006–	Sporting Cristal		

International career
- sub-17
- * Club domestic league appearances and goals

Victor Raul Anchante Licht (born August 26, 1979, in Lima, Perú) is a Peruvian footballer who plays as defender. He currently plays for Sporting Cristal.

== Profile ==
Víctor Anchante started his professional playing career in Sporting Cristal (2000–2001), after that he played in Sport Coopsol from Trujillo two years more(2002–2003).In 2004, he joined to Universidad San Martin de Porres USMP in the first year of this team in the professional level, so he is one of the "founders" of this team. During the next two years he played in Club Coronel Bolognesi from Tacna (2005–2006). Finally he returned to his home, Club Sporting Cristal S.A. (2007–2009).
