= Hilden Salas =

Peruvian footballer (born 1980)

Personal information
- Full name: Hilden Salas Castillo
- Date of birth: 19 July 1980 (age 46)
- Place of birth: Miraflores District, Arequipa, Peru
- Height: 1.76 m (5 ft 9 in)
- Position: Midfielder

Youth career
- 1998–2001: Atlético Universidad

Senior career*
Years	Team	Apps	(Gls)
2002–2009	Melgar	225	(29)
2006	→ Cienciano (loan)	17	(1)
2009	Cienciano	18	(4)
2010–2011	Sport Huancayo	38	(10)
2012–2013	Melgar	72	(6)
2014	José Gálvez	14	(3)
2014–2015	San Simón	22	(2)
2016	Alianza Universidad	21	(3)
Total		427	(58)

International career^{‡}
2005	Peru	2	(0)
- * Club domestic league appearances and goals as of 24 October 2012 ‡ National team caps and goals as of 13 October 2008

Hilden Salas Castillo (born 19 July 1980 in Arequipa, Peru) is a Peruvian Retired footballer who plays as a midfielder.

== International career ==
Nickanemd Pato, Salas has made two appearances for the Peru national football team.
