= Junior Aliberti =

Uruguayan footballer (born 1984)

Personal information
- Full name: Franco Junior Aliberti Barreto
- Date of birth: 16 June 1984 (age 42)
- Place of birth: Montevideo, Uruguay
- Height: 1.73 m (5 ft 8 in)
- Position: Forward

Team information
- Current team: Patriotas

Senior career*
Years	Team	Apps	(Gls)
2002–2004	Danubio	15	(2)
2004	Deportivo Maldonado	15	(8)
2005	Danubio	4	(0)
2005	Plaza Colonia	14	(6)
2006	Montevideo Wanderers	16	(6)
2006	Miramar Misiones	2	(0)
2007	Bella Vista	2	(0)
2007–2008	Progreso	25	(5)
2008	Cerro	13	(3)
2009	Sporting Cristal	34	(7)
2010	Deportivo Pasto		(2)
2010–2011	El Tanque Sisley	14	(1)
2011	LDU Loja	8	(2)
2012–2013	José Gálvez	51	(10)
2014	Patriotas	6	(0)
- * Club domestic league appearances and goals as of 21 January 2014

Franco Junior Aliberti Barreto (born 16 June 1984 in Montevideo) is a Uruguayan footballer (striker) who plays for Patriotas of Colombia.

== Profile ==
Junior Aliberti started his career in 2002 playing for Danubio. He stayed there until 2004 when he was loaned out mid-year to Deportivo Maldonado. He returned to Danubio the following year where he played in the Copa Libertadores, he was than transferred to Plaza Colonia during the middle of 2005.

In 2006, he went to Montevideo Wanderers and in August of that same year he went to Miramar Misiones.

In 2007, he went to C.A. Bella Vista and was than transferred to C.A. Progreso where he stayed until July 2008. He then went to Club Atlético Cerro. He transferred to Sporting Cristal in January 2009.
