= Miguel Ximénez =

Uruguayan footballer (born 1977)

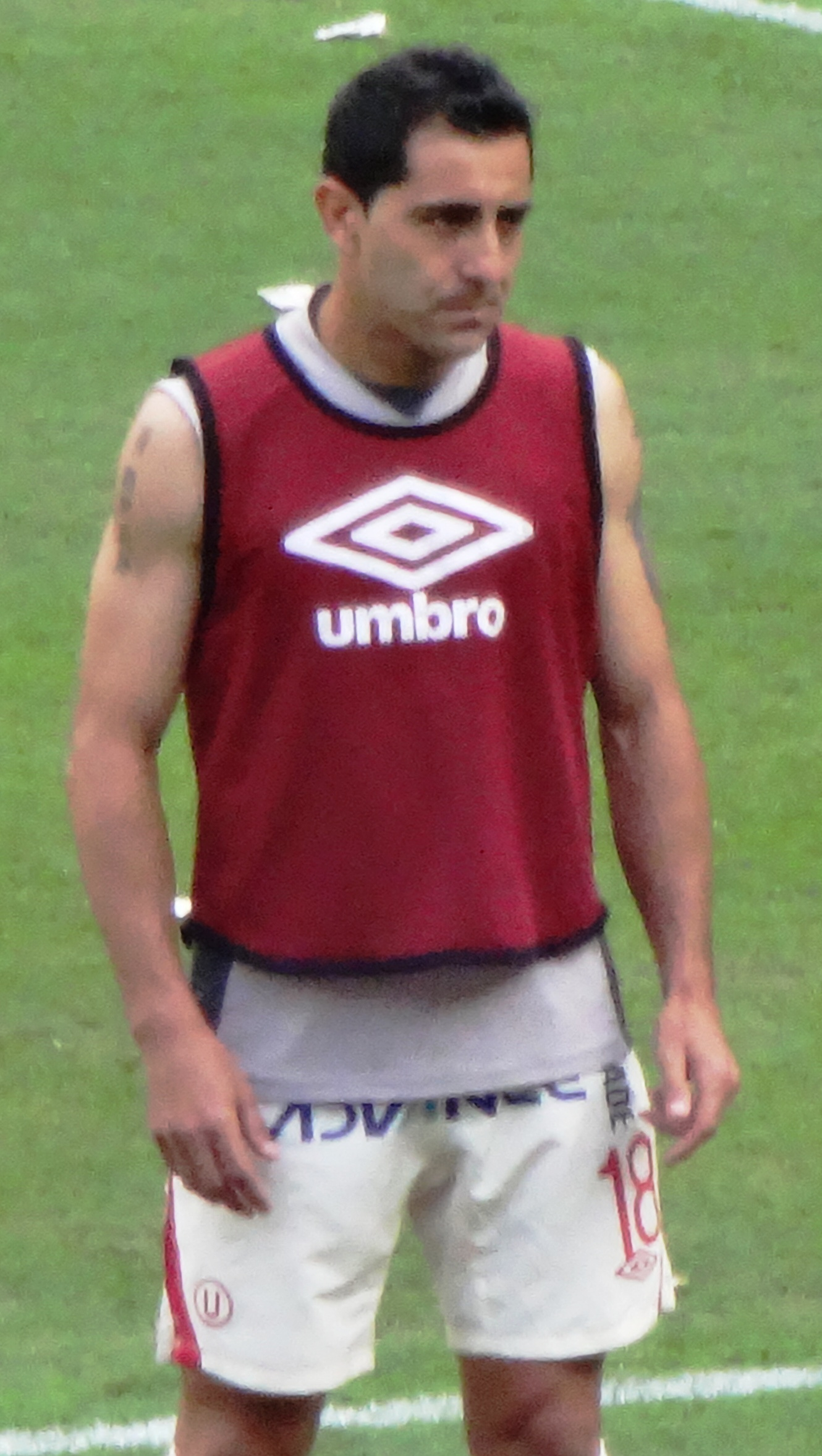
- Ximénez in 2013

Personal information
- Full name: Miguel Alejandro Ximénez Acosta
- Date of birth: 13 September 1977 (age 49)
- Place of birth: Maldonado, Uruguay
- Height: 1.72 m (5 ft 8 in)
- Position: Striker

Senior career*
Years	Team	Apps	(Gls)
1997–2005	Deportivo Maldonado	74	(27)
2002	→ Atenas de San Carlos (loan)	9	(3)
2003	→ Plaza Colonia (loan)	19	(9)
2004	→ CSD Comunicaciones (loan)	22	(13)
2005–2007	Danubio F.C.	4	(1)
2005–2006	→ Montevideo Wanderers (loan)	43	(27)
2007	→ Junior Barranquilla (loan)	19	(8)
2008–2011	Sporting Cristal	95	(47)
2009	→ Club Libertad (loan)	16	(8)
2012–2013	Universitario de Deportes	55	(24)
2014	Deportivo Maldonado	12	(5)
2014–2015	Cienciano	23	(4)
2015-2016	Atenas de San Carlos	10	(2)
- * Club domestic league appearances and goals as of 28 August 2011

Miguel "El Chino" Ximénez Acosta (born 13 September 1977) is a Uruguayan former professional footballer who played as a striker.

== Career ==
Ximénez was born in Maldonado. He was the top goalscorer in the Torneo Apertura 2008, with 20 goals in 20 games playing for Sporting Cristal, also breaking Sergio Ibarra's record of 17 goals in a Torneo Apertura.

On 26 October 2008, Ximénez scored a hat-trick against José Gálvez FBC and broke Juan Caballero's record of 29 goals in a single season with Sporting Cristal.

After a year with Club Libertad, Ximénez returned to Sporting Cristal for the 2010 season.

In 2012, he signed a new contract in the Peruvian First Division scoring 20 goals in 20 games playing for Club Universitario de Deportes. In the Peruvian 2013 Championship, he won his first National title with Universitario de Deportes.

== Honours ==
Universitario de Deportes

- Torneo Descentralizado: 2013
