= Alejandro González (Uruguayan footballer) =

Uruguayan footballer (born 1988)

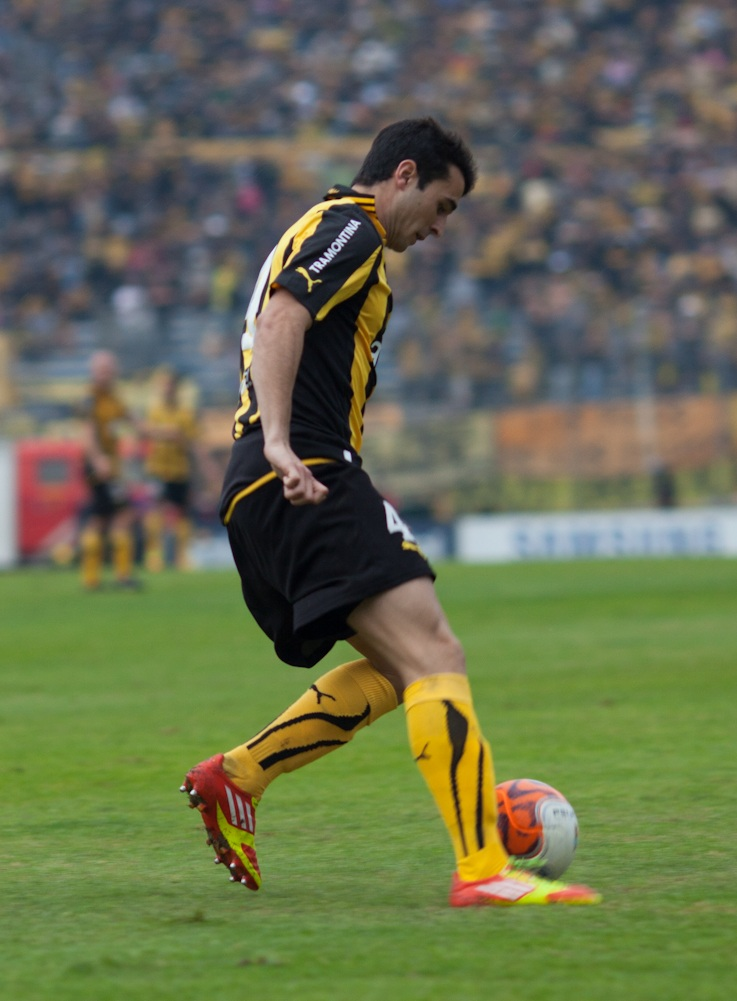
- González playing for Peñarol in 2012

Personal information
- Full name: Alejandro Damián González Hernández
- Date of birth: 23 March 1988 (age 38)
- Place of birth: Montevideo, Uruguay
- Height: 1.83 m (6 ft 0 in)
- Position: Right back

Team information
- Current team: Club Oriental
- Number: 2

Youth career
- 2005–2007: Nacional

Senior career*
| Years | Team | Apps | (Gls) |
| 2005–2008 | Peñarol | 17 | (0) |
| 2008 | → Tigres II (loan) | | |
| 2008 | → Tacuarembó (loan) | 10 | (0) |
| 2009 | → Sporting Cristal (loan) | 41 | (1) |
| 2010–2013 | Peñarol | 77 | (1) |
| 2013–2018 | Verona | 18 | (0) |
| 2015 | → Cagliari (loan) | 7 | (0) |
| 2015–2016 | → Ternana (loan) | 40 | (1) |
| 2016–2017 | → Avellino (loan) | 35 | (0) |
| 2018 | → Perugia (loan) | 2 | (0) |
| 2018–2019 | Palestino | 17 | (0) |
| 2019 | Barcelona SC | 9 | (0) |
| 2020 | Defensor Sporting | 15 | (0) |
| 2021 | Sporting Cristal | 14 | (0) |
| 2022 | Universidad San Martín | 31 | (1) |
| 2023–2024 | Miramar Misiones | 54 | (1) |
| 2025– | Club Oriental | 28 | (1) |

International career
| 2005 | Uruguay U-17 | 3 | (0) |
| 2007 | Uruguay U-20 | 4 | (0) |
- * Club domestic league appearances and goals as of 24 October 2025

Alejandro Damián González Hernández (born 23 March 1988) is a Uruguayan footballer who plays as a right back for Club Oriental. He has spent most of his career with Peñarol in his native Uruguay, as well as teams in Mexico, Peru, and Italy.

== Club career ==
González started his career in 2005 playing for Peñarol. In 2008, he was champion of the Uruguayan Torneo Clausura playing for Peñarol. He was than loaned out to Tigres B in Mexico, that same year he played for Tacuarembó F.C.

He joined Sporting Cristal in the Primera Division Peruana in January 2009.

On 28 June 2013, he joined Hellas Verona, who had just returned to Serie A, for an undisclosed fee.

On 8 January 2015, he was loaned to struggling fellow Serie A club Cagliari for the remainder of the season, the first signing by new manager Gianfranco Zola.

== International career ==
González played for Uruguay at the South American Under 17 Football Championship and the 2005 FIFA U-17 World Championship.

In 2007, he played in the 2007 South American Youth Championship.
