= Jaime Vásquez (Peruvian footballer) =

Peruvian footballer (born 1991)

Personal information
- Full name: Jaime Vásquez Ramírez
- Date of birth: 21 February 1991 (age 35)
- Place of birth: Lima, Peru
- Height: 1.74 m (5 ft 9 in)
- Position: Right back

Team information
- Current team: Deportivo Llacuabamba
- Number: 22

Youth career
- 2005–2008: Sporting Cristal

Senior career*
| Years | Team | Apps | (Gls) |
| 2009–2010 | Sporting Cristal | 5 | (0) |
| 2011–2015 | Unión Comercio | 119 | (0) |
| 2016 | UT Cajamarca | 18 | (0) |
| 2017–2018 | Unión Comercio | 43 | (0) |
| 2018 | Unión Huaral | 5 | (0) |
| 2019 | Sport Loreto | | |
| 2020– | Deportivo Llacuabamba | 3 | (0) |

International career
| 2012 | Peru | 1 | (0) |
- * Club domestic league appearances and goals as of 11:26, 18 June 2019 (UTC)

Jaime Vasquez Ramírez (born 21 February 1991 in Lima, Peru) is a Peruvian footballer who most recently played for Unión Huaral. He plays as a right-back.

== Club career ==
Vásquez came from Sporting Cristal's youth divisions. He was promoted to the first team in 2009.
