= Jeickson Reyes =

Peruvian footballer (born 1987)

Personal information
- Full name: Jeickson Gustavo Reyes Aparcana
- Date of birth: October 9, 1987 (age 39)
- Place of birth: Lima, Peru
- Height: 1.78 m (5 ft 10 in)
- Position: Left back

Team information
- Current team: EM Binacional
- Number: 87

Youth career
- –2004: Alianza Lima

Senior career*
Years	Team	Apps	(Gls)
2004	Deportivo Wanka	?	(?)
2005–2006	Alianza Lima	1	(0)
2007	Deportivo La Unión	?	(?)
2007–2008	Alianza Lima	16	(0)
2009–2010	Sporting Cristal	37	(1)
2011	Universidad César Vallejo	24	(1)
2012–2013	Juan Aurich	18	(0)
2014–2016	Ayacucho FC	77	(4)
2017	Juan Aurich	23	(1)
2018–	EM Binacional	90	(0)

International career
2007	Peru U-20	2	(0)
- * Club domestic league appearances and goals as of 15 November 2020

Jeickson Gustavo Reyes Aparcana (born October 9, 1987 in Lima, Peru) is a Peruvian footballer who plays as a left back for Escuela Municipal Deportivo Binacional.

== Club career ==
Jeickson Reyes started his playing career with Alianza Lima, playing on their youth teams. He debuted in the Torneo Descentralizado on December 15, 2004 playing for Deportivo Wanka when he was 17 years old.

Reyes returned to Alianza Lima for the 2005 Torneo Descentralizado season and stayed with them until the end of the 2006 season. At the beginning of 2007, he played for Deportivo La Unión, a team in the Copa Perú division. He once again returned to Alianza Lima for the second half of the 2007 season, where he managed to make only two league appearances. The following 2008 season he managed to play in 14 league matches for the Blanquiazules.

In January 2009, he joined Sporting Cristal for the start of the 2009 season.

== International career ==
Reyes was part of the Peru under-20 team in the 2007 South American Youth Championship
