= Manuel Tejada =

Peruvian footballer (born 1989)

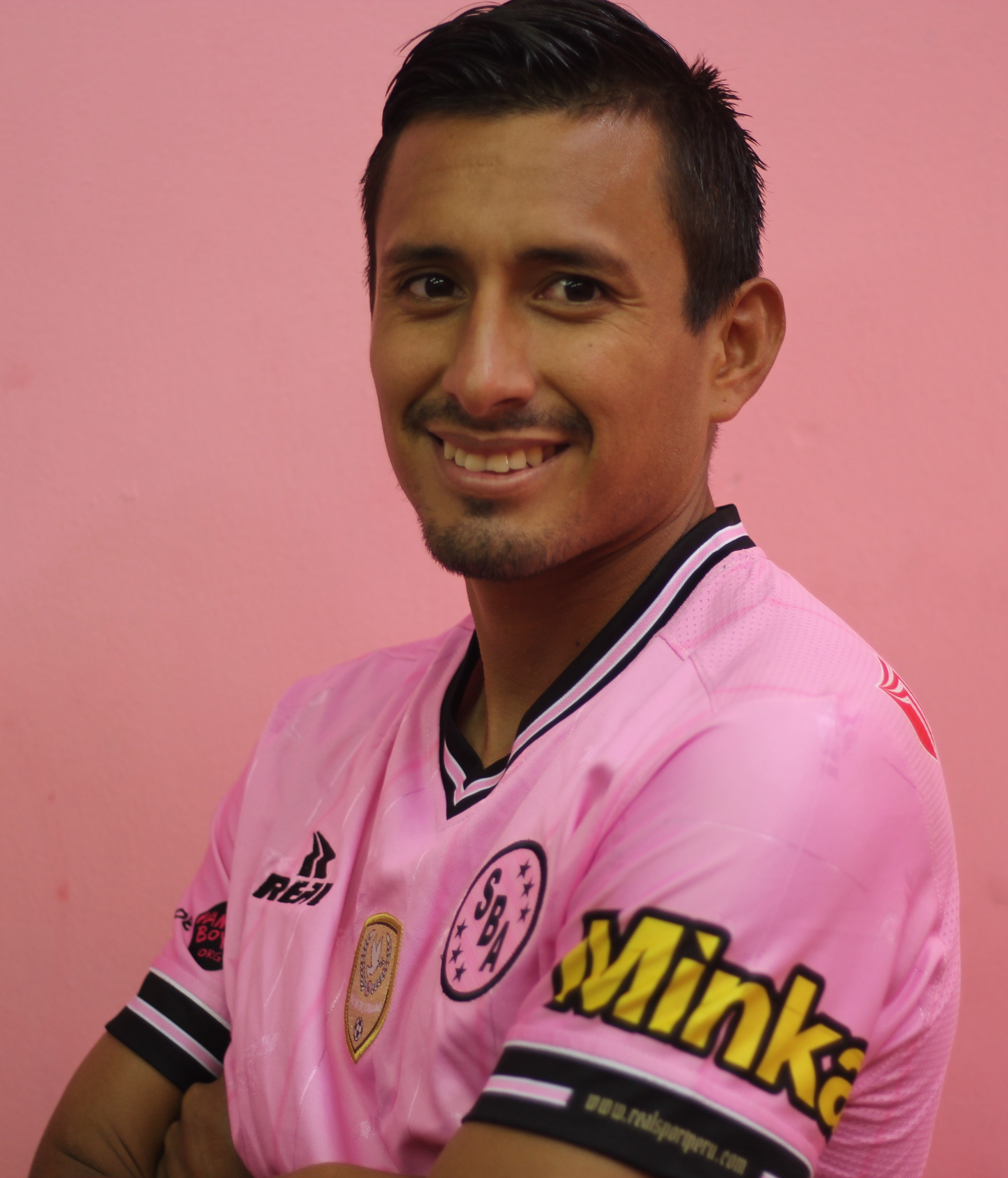
- Tejada with Sport Boys

Personal information
- Full name: Manuel Angel Tejada Medina
- Date of birth: 12 January 1989 (age 37)
- Place of birth: Lima, Peru
- Height: 1.67 m (5 ft 6 in)
- Position: Forward

Team information
- Current team: Atlético Grau
- Number: 3

Youth career
- –2007: Sporting Cristal

Senior career*
Years	Team	Apps	(Gls)
2008	Sporting Cristal	21	(1)
2009	Universidad César Vallejo	20	(2)
2010–2011	Universidad San Martín	29	(1)
2012	Sport Boys	34	(5)
2013	José Gálvez	39	(3)
2014	Cienciano	30	(0)
2015	UT Cajamarca	8	(0)
2015	Deportivo Coopsol	7	(0)
2016–2020	Sport Boys	116	(8)
2021-	Atlético Grau	72	(4)

International career
2009	Peru U-20	2	(0)
- * Club domestic league appearances and goals as of 23 October 2023

Manuel Angel Tejada Medina (born 12 January 1989) is a Peruvian footballer who plays for Atlético Grau, as a forward.

== Club career ==
Tejada was born in Lima. He came from Sporting Cristal's youth divisions. He was promoted to the First Team squad for the start of the 2008 season. On 20 February 2008, manager Juan Carlos Oblitas gave Tejada his Torneo Descentralizado debut with Sporting Cristal by entering in 67th minute in the 1–0 win away to Universidad Cesar Vallejo.

In 2009, he transferred to C.D. Universidad César Vallejo.

== Honours ==
Universidad San Martín

- Peruvian Primera División: 2010
