= Breyner Bonilla =

Colombian footballer (born 1986)

Personal information
- Full name: Breyner Bonilla Montaño
- Date of birth: July 21, 1986 (age 40)
- Place of birth: Cúcuta, Colombia
- Height: 1.86 m (6 ft 1 in)
- Position: Centre back

Team information
- Current team: Orense SC

Youth career
- Depor

Senior career*
| Years | Team | Apps | (Gls) |
| 2006–2007 | Depor | 15 | (2) |
| 2008–2010 | Atlético Bucaramanga | 32 | (3) |
| 2009–2010 | → Boca Juniors (loan) | 2 | (0) |
| 2010 | Boca Juniors | 1 | (0) |
| 2010 | → Sporting Cristal (loan) | 16 | (1) |
| 2011 | Cúcuta Deportivo | 36 | (6) |
| 2012–2015 | Deportes Tolima | 81 | (8) |
| 2016 | Defensor Sporting | 8 | (0) |
| 2016 | Fortaleza CEIF | 8 | (0) |
| 2017 | Real Cartagena | 13 | (1) |
| 2018 | LDU Loja | | |
| 2019– | Orense SC | | |
- * Club domestic league appearances and goals as of 11:05, 4 June 2019 (UTC)

Breyner Bonilla Montaño (born 21 July 1986) is a Colombian professional football player who plays as central defender for Orense SC.

== Career ==
Bonilla began to play in the Colombian lower leagues, at Depor FC. He made his debut as professional in 2006, in the Depor FC squad. He stayed at Depor FC until the end of 2007. In January 2008, he was transferred to Atlético Bucaramanga. In August 2009, Jorge Bermúdez, the former Colombian international and Boca Juniors player, recommended him to Boca Juniors, who put it on trial in a friendly match against the youth team of Tigre, where he made a good impression to coach Alfio Basile. At the end of September 2009, Boca Juniors reached an agreement with Atlético Bucaramanga to loan Bonilla for one year, following the sale of Juan Forlín in Spain, at RCD Espanyol. On 19 July 2010, after previously cutting his ties with Boca Juniors, Bonilla was loaned out to Sporting Cristal for six months.

In 2019, Bonilla joined Orense SC.
