= Edwin Pérez =

Peruvian footballer (born 1974)

Personal information
- Full name: Edwin Alberto Pérez León
- Date of birth: 28 September 1974 (age 52)
- Place of birth: Ica, Peru
- Height: 1.82 m (6 ft 0 in)
- Position: Defensive midfielder

Youth career
- Sporting Cristal

Senior career*
Years	Team	Apps	(Gls)
1995	Bella Esperanza		
1996–1997	Alcides Vigo		
1998	Sport Agustino		
1999	Coronel Bolognesi		
2000	FBC Melgar		
2000	Cienciano	18	(0)
2001–2005	FBC Melgar	55	(1)
2005–2008	Univ. San Martín	120	(0)
2009–2010	Sporting Cristal	66	(2)
2011	León de Huánuco	13	(0)
2012	Univ. César Vallejo	11	(0)
2013	Sport Áncash	8	(0)

International career
2005	Peru	2	(0)
- * Club domestic league appearances and goals as of 2 June 2013

Edwin Alberto Pérez León (born 28 September 1974 in Ica, Peru) is a Peruvian footballer who plays as a defensive midfielder. He currently plays for Sport Áncash in the Peruvian Segunda División.

== Club career ==
Pérez has played for Alcides Vigo, FBC Melgar, and Cienciano. In January 2005 he transferred to Universidad San Martín de Porres. There he won back to back National Championships in the 2007 and 2008 season.

In 2009, he transferred to Sporting Cristal.

== International career ==
Pérez has played for the Peru national football team in the 2006 FIFA World Cup qualifying rounds.

== Honours ==
=== Club ===
Universidad San Martín

- Peruvian First Division: 2007, 2008
