= Daniel Sanchez (Peruvian footballer) =

Peruvian footballer (born 1990)

Personal information
- Full name: Daniel Alonso Sánchez Albújar
- Date of birth: 2 May 1990 (age 36)
- Place of birth: Lima, Peru
- Height: 1.70 m (5 ft 7 in)
- Positions: Attacking midfielder; midfielder

Team information
- Current team: Comerciantes Unidos
- Number: 23

Youth career
- Sporting Cristal

Senior career*
Years	Team	Apps	(Gls)
2007–2011	Sporting Cristal	100	(12)
2011–2012	Univ. César Vallejo	22	(1)
2013	Ayacucho	33	(2)
2014	San Simón	10	(1)
2014	Willy Serrato	3	(0)
2015	León de Huánuco	12	(1)
2016	Sport Loreto	9	(2)
2017	Coronel Bolognesi	4	(0)
2017	Sport Victoria	7	(0)
2018–	Comerciantes Unidos	3	(0)

International career
2007	Peru U-17	3	(0)
- * Club domestic league appearances and goals as of 5 May 2018

Daniel Alonso Sánchez Albújar (born 2 May 1990 in Lima) is a Peruvian footballer who plays for Comerciantes Unidos.

== Club career ==
In 2007 Sanchez, was called along with 8 other U-20 players to the first team of Sporting Cristal. After his participation in the U17 WC, Sanchez started gaining caps in Sporting Cristal's first team. Sanchez made his debut right after the WC ended for Peru, and in 2008, he became a member of the starting line-up of the team. Sanchez wears the 23 jersey and has contributed to his team. He scored many goals in the 2008 season.

On June 9, 2011 it was announced that Daniel transferred to Peruvian team C.D. Universidad César Vallejo.

== International career ==
He was part of the Peru U-17 team that reached the quarterfinal stage at the 2007 FIFA U-17 World Cup played in South Korea. Sanchez is set to play for Peru in the next U20 South American Championship.
