= Antonio Lizarbe =

Peruvian footballer (born 1988)

Personal information
- Full name: Antonio Yosimar Lizarbe Merino
- Date of birth: 14 May 1988 (age 38)
- Place of birth: Lima, Peru
- Height: 1.72 m (5 ft 8 in)
- Position: Midfielder

Team information
- Current team: UT Cajamarca
- Number: 16

Youth career
- Sporting Cristal

Senior career*
Years	Team	Apps	(Gls)
2007–2009	Sporting Cristal		
2010–2012	Sport Boys	70	(0)
2013–	UT Cajamarca	3	(0)
- * Club domestic league appearances and goals

Antonio Yosimar Lizarbe Merino (born 14 May 1988 in Lima) is a Peruvian footballer who currently plays for Universidad Técnica de Cajamarca.

== Club career ==
Antonio Lizarbe started his career playing in the youth divisions of Sporting Cristal. In 2007, he was promoted to the first team. He debuted on 20 September 2007 in a match against Alianza Lima.

In 2008, Lizarbe was suspended for 6 months after he tested positive for cocaine in a drug test. In June 2010, he moved to Sport Boys.

Lizarbe currently plays for Universidad Técnica de Cajamarca.
