= Jean Pierre Cáncar =

Peruvian footballer (born 1987)

Personal information
- Full name: Jean Pierre Cáncar Maccari
- Date of birth: 8 July 1987 (age 39)
- Place of birth: Chanchamayo, Junín, Peru
- Height: 1.76 m (5 ft 9 in)
- Positions: Right back; right midfielder

Team information
- Current team: Cienciano
- Number: 25

Youth career
- 2004–2006: Sport Boys

Senior career*
| Years | Team | Apps | (Gls) |
| 2006–2008 | Sport Boys | 54 | (1) |
| 2009–2011 | Sporting Cristal | 27 | (0) |
| 2012 | Cienciano | 25 | (1) |
| 2013 | Los Caimanes | 23 | (0) |
| 2014 | León de Huánuco | 30 | (0) |
| 2015– | Cienciano | 14 | (0) |
- * Club domestic league appearances and goals as of 22 April 2013

Jean Pierre Cáncar Maccari (born 8 July 1987 in Chanchamayo, Junín, Peru) is a Peruvian footballer who plays as a right back or a right sided midfielder. He currently plays for Cienciano in the Primera División Peruana.

== Club career ==
Jean Pierre Cáncar started playing for his local club, Efugel, for the Copa Perú when he was only 14.

At 17, he was accepted into Sport Boys' youth divisions. In 2006, under Roberto Mosquera, he debuted with the first team in a match against Sporting Cristal.

In 2009, he was transferred to Sporting Cristal.
