= Renzo Sheput =

Peruvian footballer (born 1980)

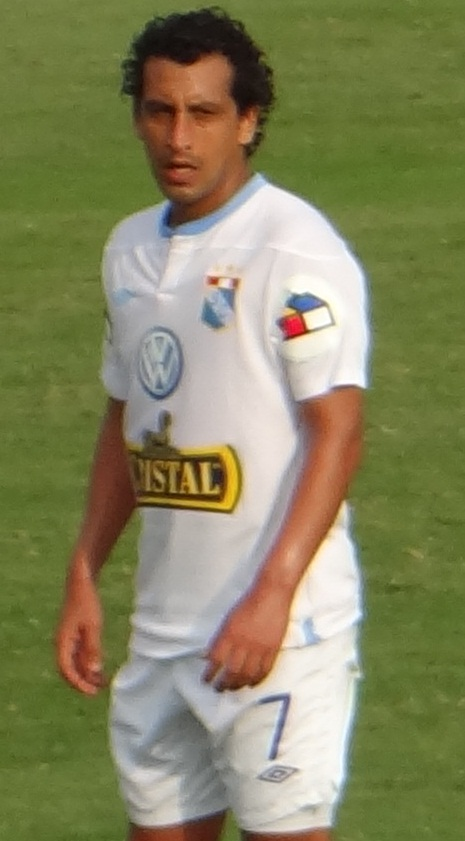
- Sheput in 2012

Personal information
- Full name: Renzo Santiago Sheput Rodríguez
- Date of birth: 8 November 1980 (age 45)
- Place of birth: San Isidro District, Lima
- Height: 1.71 m (5 ft 7 in)
- Position: Attacking midfielder

Youth career
- 1986–1998: Deportivo Zúñiga
- 1999: Sporting Cristal

Senior career*
Years	Team	Apps	(Gls)
1999–2000	Sporting Cristal	18	(0)
2000 –2003	Sporting Cristal B	?	(15)
2001	→ Union Minas (loan)	17	(3)
2001–2003	Sporting Cristal	59	(11)
2004	Univ. San Martín	44	(3)
2005–2006	Coronel Bolognesi	42	(5)
2006	Alianza Atletico	19	(4)
2007	Deportivo Municipal	37	(7)
2008–2009	Sporting Cristal	81	(12)
2010	La Equidad	34	(6)
2011	Juan Aurich	25	(6)
2012–2016	Sporting Cristal	121	(37)
2016–2017	Juan Aurich	30	(2)
2017–2018	Sport Boys	22	(4)
2018–2019	Carlos A. Mannucci	23	(5)

International career
2010–2012	Peru	2	(0)
- * Club domestic league appearances and goals

Renzo Santiago Sheput Rodríguez (born 8 November 1980) is a Peruvian former professional footballer who played as an attacking midfielder.

== Career ==
Renzo Sheput was born in Lima, Peru. He started playing with Deportivo Zúñiga at the age of 7. He was promoted to the first team of the club which played in the Second Division. In 1998, he tried out for Sporting Cristal and was immediately signed. He started playing in the U-20 team for Sporting Cristal.

Due to his good performances with the U-20 team, head coach Juan Carlos Oblitas promoted him to the first team in the month of September 1999. In 2001, he was loaned out to Union Minas for the first half of the year. He has also played for Universidad San Martín, Coronel Bolognesi FC, Alianza Atletico, Deportivo Municipal, La Equidad, and Juan Aurich.

On 22 November 2019, 39-year old Sheput announced his retirement from football.

== Honours ==
Juan Aurich

- Torneo Descentralizado: 2011

Sporting Cristal

- Torneo Descentralizado: 2002, 2012, 2014
