= Amilton Prado =

Peruvian footballer (born 1979)

Ámilton Prado
Personal information
- Full name: Ámilton Jair Prado Barrón
- Date of birth: May 6, 1979 (age 47)
- Place of birth: Lima, Peru
- Height: 1.73 m (5 ft 8 in)
- Position: Defender

Senior career*
Years	Team	Apps	(Gls)
1998	Coronel Bolognesi		
1999–2000	Sporting Cristal		
2001	Sport Coopsol		
2002	→ Alianza Lima (loan)		
2003	→ Sport Boys (loan)	17	(2)
2003	→ Alianza Lima (loan)	11	(0)
2004–2009	Sporting Cristal	212	(7)
2010–2011	Alianza Lima	48	(0)
2013–2014	Ayacucho	84	(5)
2015	León de Huánuco	11	(0)

International career
2006–2009	Peru	28	(0)
- * Club domestic league appearances and goals

Ámilton Jair Prado Barrón (born 6 May 1979 in Lima, Peru) is a Peruvian soccer player who last played for León de Huánuco.

== International career ==
Prado has made 28 appearances for the Peru national football team.

== Honours ==
Sporting Cristal

- Torneo Descentralizado: 2005
- Torneo Clausura: 1998, 2004, 2005

Alianza Lima

- Torneo Descentralizado: 2003
- Torneo Clausura: 2003
