= Damián Ísmodes =

Peruvian footballer (born 1989)

Personal information
- Full name: Damián Diego Ísmodes Saravia
- Date of birth: 10 March 1989 (age 37)
- Place of birth: Lima, Peru
- Height: 1.80 m (5 ft 11 in)
- Position: Midfielder

Team information
- Current team: Alianza Universidad
- Number: 12

Youth career
- Sporting Cristal

Senior career*
Years	Team	Apps	(Gls)
2005–2007	Sporting Cristal	44	(4)
2008–2011	Racing Santander	1	(0)
2009	→ Eibar (loan)	3	(0)
2009–2010	→ Sporting Cristal (loan)	34	(4)
2011	→ Universitario (loan)	15	(1)
2012–2013	Cienciano	66	(5)
2014	León Huánuco	23	(2)
2015–2017	Deportivo Municipal	62	(5)
2018	Sport Boys	28	(2)
2019	Real Garcilaso	15	(0)
2020	Cienciano	11	(2)
2021	Alianza Universidad	16	(2)
2022-	Carlos Stein	24	(3)

International career
2007–2009	Peru	6	(0)
- * Club domestic league appearances and goals as of 18:48, 20 June 2021 (UTC)

Damián Diego Ísmodes Saravia (born 10 March 1989) is a Peruvian footballer who plays for Carlos Stein as a midfielder.

== Club career ==
Ísmodes was born in Lima. After just two years of professional football, playing with hometown's Sporting Cristal, he signed in the 2008 January transfer window with La Liga club Racing de Santander, appearing in one match, the 1–1 away draw against CA Osasuna on 18 May 2008; after receiving very little playing time, however, he was loaned by the Cantabrians one year later, joining second division side SD Eibar until the end of the campaign.

In August 2009, after the start to his Spanish career—only four league appearances in two seasons combined, and relegation with Eibar—Ísmodes was loaned to former team Sporting Cristal until the end of 2010, returning home. He stayed in the country afterwards, this time loaned to Universitario de Deportes for one year.

Released on 30 June 2011, Ísmodes returned to his country and went on to represent several clubs in the Primera División.

== International career ==
A full Peruvian international since the age of 18, Ísmodes was selected for the final squad at 2007 Copa América, where he appeared once.
