= Manuel Heredia (footballer) =

Peruvian footballer (born 1986)

Personal information
- Full name: Manuel Alexander Heredia Rojas
- Date of birth: 9 January 1986 (age 40)
- Place of birth: Lima, Peru
- Height: 1.89 m (6 ft 2 in)
- Position: Goalkeeper

Team information
- Current team: UTC Cajamarca
- Number: 12

Youth career
- –2003: Sporting Cristal

Senior career*
Years	Team	Apps	(Gls)
2004–2005	Sporting Cristal	0	(0)
2006–2007	Coronel Bolognesi	10	(0)
2008	→ Sporting Cristal (loan)	21	(0)
2008	Coronel Bolognesi	25	(0)
2009	Sporting Cristal	20	(0)
2010	Total Chalaco	26	(0)
2011	Sporting Cristal	7	(0)
2012	Cienciano	0	(0)
2013–2014	Alianza Lima	25	(0)
2015	UTC Cajamarca	15	(0)
2016–2017	Defensor La Bocana	33	(0)
2018	Ozark FC	0	(0)
2018–2024	Carlos A. Mannucci	177	(0)
2025–	UTC Cajamarca	5	(0)

International career
2009	Peru	1	(0)
- * Club domestic league appearances and goals as of 30 December 2025

Manuel Alexander Heredia Rojas (born 9 January 1986) is a Peruvian footballer who plays as a goalkeeper for UTC Cajamarca.

== Club career ==
Heredia came from the youth division at Sporting Cristal, completing in 2003. In 2006, he was transferred to Coronel Bolognesi.

In 2008, he was loaned out to his former club, Sporting Cristal for the first half of the year. After the 2008 season, he transferred to Sporting Cristal.

== International career ==
Heredia made his debut for the Peru national team in 2009.

== Honours ==
=== Club ===
Coronel Bolognesi FC

- Clausura: 2007

Carlos A. Mannucci

- Copa Bicentenario; Runner Up 2021

== Personal life ==
Manuel married his wife, Lindsay Smith, in 2010.
