= Erick Delgado =

Peruvian footballer (born 1982)

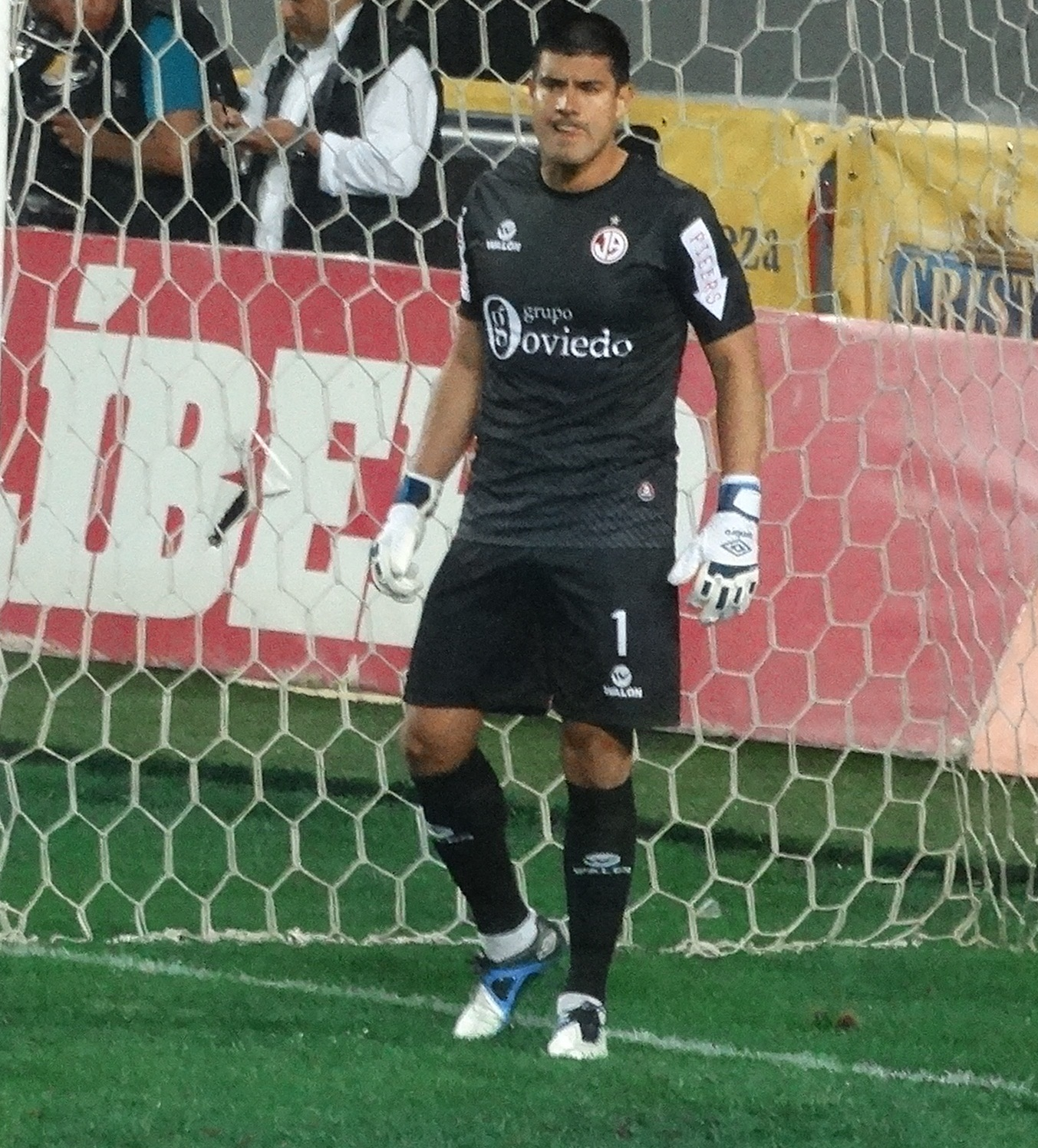
- Delgado in 2014

Personal information
- Full name: Erick Guillermo Delgado Vásquez
- Date of birth: 30 June 1982 (age 44)
- Place of birth: Lima, Peru
- Height: 1.83 m (6 ft 0 in)
- Position: Goalkeeper

Youth career
- Sporting Cristal

Senior career*
Years	Team	Apps	(Gls)
2001–2008	Sporting Cristal	219	(0)
2009	Juan Aurich	42	(0)
2010–2012	Sporting Cristal	91	(0)
2013–2014	Juan Aurich	53	(0)
2015–2017	Deportivo Municipal	105	(0)
2018	Universidad San Martín	19	(0)
2019	UTC Cajamarca	29	(0)
2020	Academia Cantolao	20	(0)

International career
2003–2013	Peru	14	(0)
- * Club domestic league appearances and goals

Erick Guillermo Delgado Vásquez (born 30 June 1982) is a Peruvian former professional footballer who played as a goalkeeper.

== Club career ==
Delgado began his career with Sporting Cristal, being promoted to the senior side in 2001. In his first seven years with the club, he played 219 league matches in the Torneo Descentralizado, before and transferring to Juan Aurich in January 2009.

Delgado returned to Sporting Cristal in January 2010.

== International career ==
Delgado has made 14 appearances for the Peru national team.

== Personal life ==
In 2007, Delgado suffered burns on the soles of his feet after playing on artificial turf or artificial pitch in blazing sun.

== Honours ==
Sporting Cristal

- Torneo Descentralizado: 2002, 2005, 2012
- Apertura: 2003
- Clausura: 2004, 2005
