= Peru at the Copa América =

Record of Peru at Copa América

This is a record of Peru's results at the Copa América. Ever since their first Copa América, Peru has had good showings. It is often remembered by fans that Peru was the fourth team (after Uruguay, Argentina, and Brazil) to win the South American cup. Even though in 1939 Peru played against only 5 of the South American nations (with no participation from Argentina or Brazil), in 1975 Peru won the cup once more (this time with all the CONMEBOL teams participating).

Recently, Peru has only been able to get only as far as the runners-up of the tournament which holds its own prestige as being the oldest tournament of international football; along with having Argentina and Brazil (the 2 teams usually considered among the top 5 in the football world), which have also recently been dominating the tournament.

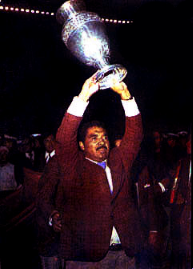
Marcos Calderón lifting the trophy obtained with the Peruvian team in 1975

== Overall record ==
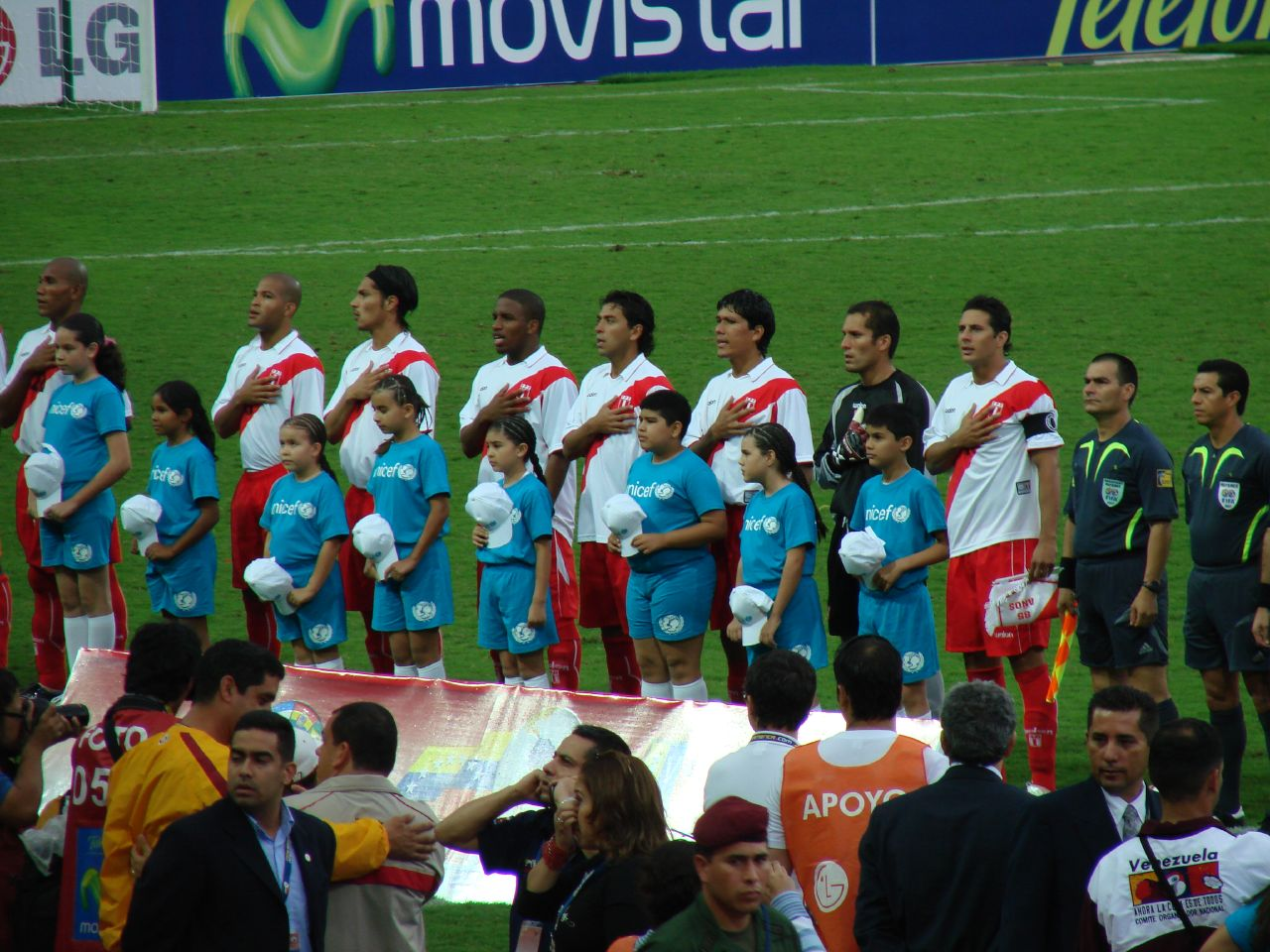
Peru's national football team at the 2007 Copa América in Venezuela

South American Championship / Copa América record
Year	Round	Position	Pld	W	D*	L	GF	GA	Squad
(Argentina) 1916	Did not participate								
(Uruguay) 1917	Did not participate								
(Brazil) 1919	Did not participate								
(Chile) 1920	Did not participate								
(Argentina) 1921	Did not participate								
(Brazil) 1922	Did not participate								
(Uruguay) 1923	Did not participate								
(Uruguay) 1924	Did not participate								
(Argentina) 1925	Did not participate								
(Chile) 1926	Did not participate								
(Peru) 1927	Third place	3rd	3	1	0	2	4	11	Squad
(Argentina) 1929	Fourth place	4th	3	0	0	3	1	12	Squad
(Peru) 1935	Third place	3rd	3	1	0	2	2	5	Squad
(Argentina) 1937	Sixth place	6th	5	1	1	3	7	10	Squad
(Peru) 1939	Champions	1st	4	4	0	0	13	4	Squad
(Chile) 1941	Fourth place	4th	4	1	0	3	5	5	Squad
(Uruguay) 1942	Fifth place	5th	6	1	2	3	5	10	Squad
(Chile) 1945	Withdrew								
(Argentina) 1946	Withdrew								
(Ecuador) 1947	Fifth place	5th	7	2	2	3	12	9	Squad
(Brazil) 1949	Third place	3rd	7	5	0	2	20	13	Squad
(Peru) 1953	Fifth place	5th	6	3	1	2	4	6	Squad
(Chile) 1955	Third place	3rd	5	2	2	1	13	11	Squad
(Uruguay) 1956	Sixth place	6th	5	0	1	4	6	11	Squad
(Peru) 1957	Fourth place	4th	6	4	0	2	12	9	Squad
(Argentina) 1959	Fourth place	4th	6	1	3	2	10	11	Squad
(Ecuador) 1959	Withdrew								
(Bolivia) 1963	Fifth place	5th	6	2	1	3	8	11	Squad
(Uruguay) 1967	Withdrew								
1975	Champions	1st	9	6	1	2	14	7	Squad
1979	Semi-finals	3rd	2	0	1	1	1	2	Squad
1983	Semi-finals	3rd	6	2	3	1	7	6	Squad
(Argentina) 1987	Group stage	6th	2	0	2	0	2	2	Squad
(Brazil) 1989	Group stage	8th	4	0	3	1	4	7	Squad
(Chile) 1991	Group stage	8th	4	1	0	3	9	9	Squad
(Ecuador) 1993	Quarter-finals	7th	4	1	2	1	4	5	Squad
(Uruguay) 1995	Group stage	10th	3	0	1	2	2	5	Squad
(Bolivia) 1997	Fourth place	4th	6	3	0	3	5	11	Squad
(Paraguay) 1999	Quarter-finals	7th	4	2	1	1	7	6	Squad
(Colombia) 2001	Quarter-finals	8th	4	1	1	2	4	8	Squad
(Peru) 2004	Quarter-finals	7th	4	1	2	1	7	6	Squad
(Venezuela) 2007	Quarter-finals	7th	4	1	1	2	5	8	Squad
(Argentina) 2011	Third place	3rd	6	3	1	2	8	5	Squad
(Chile) 2015	Third place	3rd	6	3	1	2	8	5	Squad
(United States) 2016	Quarter-finals	5th	4	2	2	0	4	2	Squad
(Brazil) 2019	Runners-up	2nd	6	2	2	2	6	7	Squad
(Brazil) 2021	Fourth place	4th	7	2	2	3	10	14	Squad
(United States) 2024	Group stage	13th	3	0	1	2	0	3	Squad
Total	2 Titles	34/48	164	58	40	66	229	256	—

== Record by opponent ==
Peru's highest margin of victory at a Copa América is four goals, which they have managed a number of times: They won 4–0 against Ecuador in 1941 and 1949, and against Colombia in 1949, and won 5–1 against Colombia in 1947, and against Venezuela in 1991. Peru's biggest defeat was a 0–7 loss against Brazil in the 1997 semi-finals.

Copa América matches (by team)
Opponent	W	D	L	Pld	GF	GA
Argentina	3	2	13	18	19	42
Bolivia	9	4	3	16	28	17
Brazil	3	3	15	21	14	47
Canada	0	0	1	1	0	1
Chile	7	7	8	22	31	27
Colombia	8	7	3	18	30	17
Ecuador	8	4	1	13	30	14
Haiti	1	0	0	1	1	0
Japan	1	0	0	1	3	2
Mexico	2	1	2	5	7	8
Paraguay	4	7	7	18	25	35
Uruguay	6	3	12	21	25	42
Venezuela	6	2	1	9	17	6
Total	58	40	66	164	230	258

== Peru 1927 ==
At this point Peru is the 7th nation to join the competition, and in 1927 the games are decided to be played there. Although only 3 teams came to the tournament, Argentina, Uruguay, and Bolivia; the participating federations decided that the 1st and 2nd places of the competition would represent South America for the Olympic Games to be played at Amsterdam in 1928. The other federations (Brazil, Chile, and Paraguay) did not participate because of economic and sport problems. Peru gained third place after only beating Bolivia.

=== Single phase ===
Team	Pld	W	D	L	GF	GA	GD	Pts
Argentina	3	3	0	0	15	4	+11	6
Uruguay	3	2	0	1	15	3	+12	4
Peru	3	1	0	2	4	11	−7	2
Bolivia	3	0	0	3	3	19	−16	0

1 November 1927	Uruguay	4–0	Peru	Estadio Nacional, Lima
	Ulloa 49' (o.g.); Sacco 52', 71'; Castro 75'			Referee: Consolato Nay Foino (Argentina)

13 November 1927	Peru	3–2	Bolivia	Estadio Nacional, Lima
	Neyra 31'; Sarmiento 41'; Montellanos 43'		Bustamante 13', 14'	Referee: Alberto Parodi (Chile)

27 November 1927	Argentina	5–1	Peru	Estadio Nacional, Lima
	Ferreira 1', 30'; Maglio 22', 25'; Carricaberry 38'		Villanueva 3'	Referee: Victorio Gariboni (Bolivia)

=== Goalscorers ===
Rank	Player	Goals
1	Neyra	1
1	Sarmiento	1
1	Montellanos	1
1	Villanueva	1

== Argentina 1929 ==
=== Final round ===
Team	Pld	W	D	L	GF	GA	GD	Pts
Argentina	3	3	0	0	9	1	+8	6
Paraguay	3	2	0	1	9	4	+5	4
Uruguay	3	1	0	2	4	6	−2	2
Peru	3	0	0	3	1	12	−11	0

3 November 1929	Argentina	3–0	Peru	Estadio Gasómetro, Buenos Aires
	Peucelle 6'; Zumelzú 38', 58'			Referee: Aníbal Tejada (Uruguay)

11 November 1929	Peru	1–4	Uruguay	Estadio Alvear y Tagle, Buenos Aires
	Lizarbe 81'		Fernández 21', 29', 43'; Andrade 69'	Referee: Miguel Barba (Paraguay)

16 November 1929	Paraguay	5–0	Peru	Independiente Stadium, Avellaneda
	Nessi 10'; González 55', 63', 69'; Domínguez 82'			Referee: José Galli (Argentina)

== Peru 1935 ==
This tournament is characterized by the Argentine and Uruguayan conflict that rooted from the 1930 World Cup. The winners here were going to once more represent South America for the Olympic Games, this time to be played at Berlin. Brazil, Bolivia, and Paraguay had withdrawn from the tournament. Peru's first game resulted at a 1–0 loss, with a goal scored by a Uruguayan player at the 80th minute. The second one was not much better, and Peru lost 4–1 against Argentina. The last game was won by Peru 1–0 against Chile. The tournament gave Peru the third spot, and helped it train and improve for the 1936 Summer Olympics.

=== Single phase ===
Team	Pld	W	D	L	GF	GA	GD	Pts
Uruguay	3	3	0	0	6	1	+5	6
Argentina	3	2	0	1	8	5	+3	4
Peru	3	1	0	2	2	5	−3	2
Chile	3	0	0	3	2	7	−5	0

13 January 1935	Uruguay	1–0	Peru	Estadio Nacional, Lima
	H. Castro 80'			Referee: Humberto Reginato (Chile)

20 January 1935	Argentina	4–1	Peru	Estadio Nacional, Lima
	Masantonio 10', 61', 81'; García 50'		T. Fernández 2'	Referee: César Pioli (Uruguay)

26 January 1935	Peru	1–0	Chile	Estadio Nacional, Lima
	Montellanos 5'			Referee: Eduardo Forte (Argentina)

=== Goalscorers ===
Rank	Player	Goals
1	T. Fernández	1
1	Montellanos	1

== Argentina 1937 ==
=== Final round ===
Team	Pld	W	D	L	GF	GA	GD	Pts
Argentina	5	4	0	1	12	5	+7	8
Brazil	5	4	0	1	17	9	+8	8
Uruguay	5	2	0	3	11	14	−3	4
Paraguay	5	2	0	3	8	16	−8	4
Chile	5	1	1	3	12	13	−1	3
Peru	5	1	1	3	7	10	−3	3

27 December 1936	Brazil	3–2	Peru	Estadio Gasómetro, Buenos Aires
	Roberto 7'; Afonsinho 30'; Niginho 57'		T. Fernández 55'; Villanueva 58'	Referee: Alfredo Vargas (Chile)

6 January 1937	Uruguay	4–2	Peru	Estadio Gasómetro, Buenos Aires
	Camaití 16'; Varela 31', 56'; Píriz 79'		T. Fernández 29'; Magallanes 40'	Referee: Aníbal Tejada (Uruguay)

16 January 1937	Argentina	1–0	Peru	Estadio Gasómetro, Buenos Aires
	Zozaya 55'			Referee: Aníbal Tejada (Uruguay)

21 January 1937	Peru	2–2	Chile	Estadio Gasómetro, Buenos Aires
	J. Alcalde 1', 26'		Torres 16'; Carmona 70'	Referee: José Bartolomé Macías (Argentina)

24 January 1937	Paraguay	0–1	Peru	Estadio Alvear y Tagle, Buenos Aires
			Lavalle 43'	Referee: Aníbal Tejada (Uruguay)

== Peru 1939 ==
This was the first international title the team won. During this time, the team had greatly improved since the World Cup and was re-assuring that dominance they had shown over Austria in the 1936 Berlin Olympics. Peru won all 4 games which were against Ecuador (5–2), Chile (3–1), Paraguay (3–0), and Uruguay (2–1) in the final. It's worth the mention that in this tournament Argentina and Brazil did not participate, but that does not take down the merit of Peru's notable act. Peruvian Teodoro Fernández also was the top goal-scorer of the tournament. As an anecdote, Peru was the fourth South American team that raised the trophy (The first three being Argentina, Uruguay, and Brazil).

=== Single phase ===
Team	Pld	W	D	L	GF	GA	GD	Pts
Peru	4	4	0	0	13	4	+9	8
Uruguay	4	3	0	1	13	5	+8	6
Paraguay	4	2	0	2	9	8	+1	4
Chile	4	1	0	3	8	12	−4	2
Ecuador	4	0	0	4	4	18	−14	0

15 January 1939	Peru	5–2	Ecuador	Estadio Nacional, Lima
	T. Fernández 6', 34', 77'; J. Alcalde 16', 58'		Alcívar 55', 89'	Referee: Carlos Puyol (Uruguay)

22 January 1939	Peru	3–1	Chile	Estadio Nacional, Lima
	T. Fernández 46', 65' (pen.); J. Alcalde 80'		Domínguez 55'	Referee: Carlos Puyol (Uruguay)

29 January 1939	Peru	3–0	Paraguay	Estadio Nacional, Lima
	T. Fernández 11', 30'; J. Alcalde 78'			Referee: Alfredo Vargas (Chile)

12 February 1939	Peru	2–1	Uruguay	Estadio Nacional, Lima
	J. Alcalde 7'; Bielich 35'		Porta 44'	Referee: Alfredo Vargas (Chile)

=== Goalscorers ===
Rank	Player	Goals
1	T. Fernández	7
2	J. Alcalde	5
3	Bielich	1

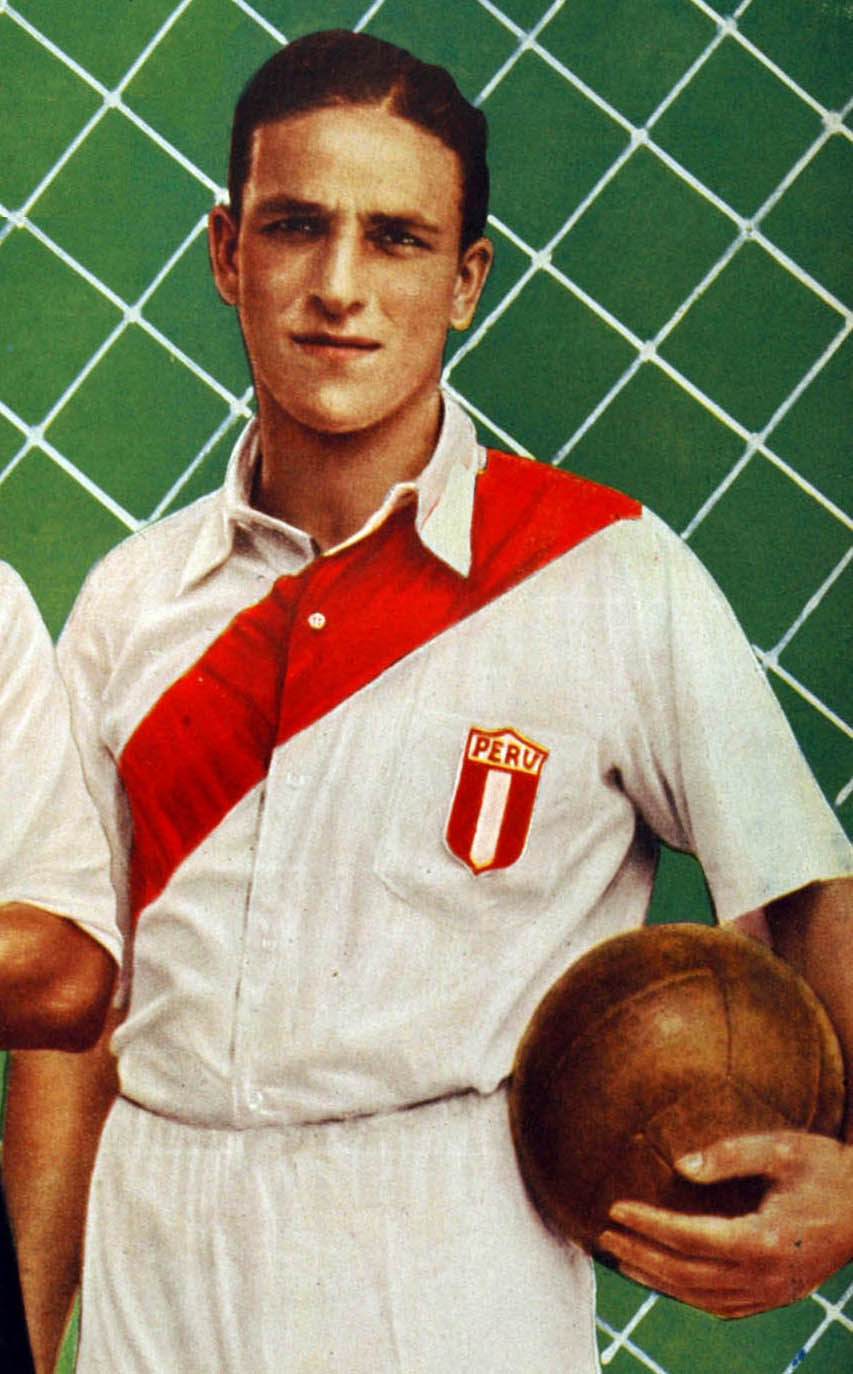
Teodoro Fernández was the top scorer in the 1939 South American Championship

== Chile 1941 ==
=== Final round ===
Team	Pld	W	D	L	GF	GA	GD	Pts
Argentina	4	4	0	0	10	2	+8	8
Uruguay	4	3	0	1	10	1	+9	6
Chile	4	2	0	2	6	3	+3	4
Peru	4	1	0	3	5	5	0	2
Ecuador	4	0	0	4	1	21	−20	0

9 February 1941	Chile	1–0	Peru	Estadio Nacional, Santiago
	Pérez 20'			Referee: José Bartolomé Macías (Argentina)

12 February 1941	Argentina	2–1	Peru	Estadio Nacional, Santiago
	Moreno 2', 72'		Socarraz 53'	Referee: Alfredo Vargas (Chile)

23 February 1941	Peru	4–0	Ecuador	Estadio Nacional, Santiago
	T. Fernández 25', 32', 48'; Vallejas 36'			Referee: Víctor Francisco Rivas (Chile)

26 February 1941	Uruguay	2–0	Peru	Estadio Nacional, Santiago
	Riephoff 37'; Varela 70'			Referee: José Bartolomé Macías (Argentina)

== Uruguay 1942 ==
=== Final round ===
Team	Pld	W	D	L	GF	GA	GD	Pts
Uruguay	6	6	0	0	21	2	+19	12
Argentina	6	5	0	1	21	6	+15	10
Brazil	6	3	1	2	15	7	+8	7
Paraguay	6	2	2	2	11	10	+1	6
Peru	6	1	2	3	5	10	−5	4
Chile	6	1	1	4	4	15	−11	3
Ecuador	6	0	0	6	4	31	−27	0

18 January 1942	Paraguay	1–1	Peru	Estadio Centenario, Montevideo
	Barrios 35'		Magallanes 1'	Referee: José Bartolomé Macías (Argentina)

21 January 1942	Brazil	2–1	Peru	Estadio Centenario, Montevideo
	Amorim 43', 56'		Fernández 73'	Referee: Marcos Gerinaldo Rojas (Paraguay)

25 January 1942	Argentina	3–1	Peru	Estadio Centenario, Montevideo
	Heredia 12'; Moreno 65', 72'		Fernández 17'	Referee: Aníbal Tejada (Uruguay)

28 January 1942	Peru	2–1	Ecuador	Estadio Centenario, Montevideo
	Quiñónez 32'; Guzmán 62'		Jiménez 52'	Referee: Aníbal Tejada (Uruguay)

1 February 1942	Uruguay	3–0	Peru	Estadio Centenario, Montevideo
	Chirimini 47'; L. E. Castro 54'; Porta 77'			Referee: José Bartolomé Macías (Argentina)

7 February 1942	Chile	0–0	Peru	Estadio Centenario, Montevideo
				Referee: José Bartolomé Macías (Argentina)

== Brazil 1949 ==
By this time, Peruvian football was recognized by good game and playful management of the ball. Several interesting players came to the national team, but the team faced several problems with the directors and the players themselves. Peru won all but two games. As such, the national team got third place. Paraguay and Brazil, the only ones who beat Peru, had to later play a last tie-breaker match.

=== Squad ===
Head Coach: (Peru) Arturo Fernández

No.	Pos.	Player	Date of birth (age)	Caps	Goals	Club
—	DF	Gerardo Arce		0	0	(Peruvian Football Federation) Alianza Lima
—	MF	Luis Calderón	17 June 1929 (aged 19)	0	0	(Peruvian Football Federation) Sport Boys
—	FW	Félix Castillo	21 February 1928 (aged 21)	0	0	(Peruvian Football Federation) Alianza Lima
—	MF	Germán Colunga		0	0	(Peruvian Football Federation) Deportivo Municipal
—	DF	Andrés da Silva	21 March 1921 (aged 28)	0	0	(Peruvian Football Federation) Club Universitario de Deportes
—	FW	Manuel Drago	14 November 1924 (aged 24)	0	0	(Peruvian Football Federation) Sport Boys
—	MF	Roberto Drago	28 July 1923 (aged 25)	0	0	(Peruvian Football Federation) Deportivo Municipal
—	DF	Félix Fuentes	25 April 1922 (aged 26)	0	0	(Peruvian Football Federation) Alianza Lima
—	FW	Carlos Gómez Sánchez	4 October 1923 (aged 25)	0	0	(Peruvian Football Federation) Alianza Lima
—	FW	Alejandro González	17 March 1915 (aged 34)	0	0	(Peruvian Football Federation) Alianza Lima
—	MF	Cornelio Heredia	16 October 1920 (aged 28)	0	0	(Peruvian Football Federation) Alianza Lima
—	MF	Dagoberto Lavalle	25 March 1925 (aged 24)	0	0	(Peruvian Football Federation) Sport Boys
—	FW	Leónidas Mendoza		0	0	(Peruvian Football Federation) Sporting Tabaco
—	FW	Ernesto Morales		0	0	(Peruvian Football Federation) Atlético Chalaco
—	FW	Alfredo Mosquera	15 February 1928 (aged 21)	0	0	(Peruvian Football Federation) Sporting Tabaco
—	GK	Walter Ormeño	3 December 1926 (aged 22)	0	0	(Peruvian Football Federation) Club Universitario de Deportes
—	MF	Lorenzo Pacheco	10 August 1919 (aged 29)	0	0	(Peruvian Football Federation) Sport Boys
—	FW	Víctor Pedraza		0	0	(Peruvian Football Federation) Alianza Lima
—	FW	Juan Emilio Salinas	12 July 1925 (aged 23)	0	0	(Peruvian Football Federation) Alianza Lima
—	FW	Pedro Valdivieso	19 October 1922 (aged 26)	0	0	(Peruvian Football Federation) Sport Boys

=== Single phase ===
Team	Pld	W	D	L	GF	GA	GD	Pts
Brazil	7	6	0	1	39	7	+32	12
Paraguay	7	6	0	1	21	6	+15	12
Peru	7	5	0	2	20	13	+7	10
Bolivia	7	4	0	3	13	24	−11	8
Chile	7	2	1	4	10	14	−4	5
Uruguay	7	2	1	4	14	20	−6	5
Ecuador	7	1	0	6	7	21	−14	2
Colombia	7	0	2	5	4	23	−19	2

10 April 1949	Peru	4–0	Colombia	Estádio São Januário, Rio de Janeiro
	Pedraza 22', 90'; Drago 47'; Castillo 85'			Attendance: 15,000; Referee: Mario Rubén Heyn (Paraguay)

13 April 1949	Paraguay	3–1	Peru	Estádio São Januário, Rio de Janeiro
	Barrios 38' (pen.); Arce 56'; López Fretes 67'		Drago 89'	Attendance: 30,000; Referee: Cyril Jack Barrick (England)

24 April 1949	Brazil	7–1	Peru	Estádio São Januário, Rio de Janeiro
	Arce 11' (o.g.); Augusto 15'; Jair 17', 20'; Simão 54'; Ademir 82'; Orlando 88'; Zizinho (red card) 40'		Salinas 44'; Calderón (red card) 40'; González (red card)	Attendance: 45,000; Referee: Cyril Jack Barrick (England)

27 April 1949	Peru	3–0	Bolivia	Estádio Vila Belmiro, Santos
	R. Drago 31', 74'; Heredia 77' (pen.)			Attendance: 12,000; Referee: Alberto Da Gama Malcher (Brazil)

30 April 1949	Peru	3–0	Chile	Estádio do Pacaembu, São Paulo
	Mosquera 28', 73'; Castillo 58'			Attendance: 1,000; Referee: Mário Gardelli (Brazil)

4 May 1949	Peru	4–3	Uruguay	Estádio General Severiano, Rio de Janeiro
	Mosquera 19'; Castillo 43'; Gómez Sánchez 57', 60'		Moll 58'; Castro 60'; Ayala 85'	Attendance: 30,000; Referee: Alfredo Alvarez (Bolivia)

== Peru 1953 ==
As much as Peru did, the team was not capable to achieve another Copa América title until later years. Yet, the games played in 1953 are memorable to Peruvian football history because it was the first time Peru was able to beat Brazil (A certain something not many have been able to achieve). The goal was scored by Navarrete.

=== Final round ===
Team	Pld	W	D	L	GF	GA	GD	Pts
Brazil	6	4	0	2	15	6	+9	8
Paraguay	6	3	2	1	11	6	+5	8
Uruguay	6	3	1	2	15	6	+9	7
Chile	6	3	1	2	10	10	0	7
Peru	6	3	1	2	4	6	−2	7
Bolivia	6	1	1	4	6	15	−9	3
Ecuador	6	0	2	4	1	13	−12	2

22 February 1953	Bolivia	1–0	Peru	Estadio Nacional, Lima
	Ugarte 53'			Attendance: 50,000; Referee: George Rhoden (England)

28 February 1953	Peru	1–0	Ecuador	Estadio Nacional, Lima
	Gómez Sánchez 78'			Attendance: 50,000; Referee: George Rhoden (England)

4 March 1953	Chile	0–0	Peru	Estadio Nacional, Lima
				Attendance: 45,000; Referee: Richard Maddison (England)

8 March 1953	Peru	2–2	Paraguay	Estadio Nacional, Lima
	Gómez Sánchez 47'; Terry 53'		Fernández 36'; Berni 77'	Attendance: 45,000; Referee: Richard Maddison (England) Match was awarded to Peru due to unsportsmanlike behaviour of Paraguay by making one extra change.

19 March 1953	Peru	1–0	Brazil	Estadio Nacional, Lima
	Navarrete 51'			Attendance: 55,000; Referee: Charles McKenna (England)

28 March 1953	Uruguay	3–0	Peru	Estadio Nacional, Lima
	Peláez 23', 67'; Carlos Romero 71'			Attendance: 45,000; Referee: Mário Vianna (Brazil)

== 1975 Copa América ==
This tournament had no fixed venue. For the first phase, Peru was grouped with Chile and Bolivia. After winning both games, which were played both at home and away, Peru qualified for the semifinals along with Colombia, Brazil, and Uruguay (Which were the defending champions). Perhaps unlucky for Peru, they had to face Brazil for their semifinal. At the city of Belo Horizonte in Brazil, Peru beat the Verdeamarela by a margin of 3 to 1 with two goals from Enrique Cassareto and one by Teófilo Cubillas. The game played back home at Lima was won by Brazil 2–0. Due to the goal difference, the winner (Which turned out being Peru) was chosen by sorting.

The final match was played against Colombia, who had beaten Uruguay. The game played at Bogotá was won by the Colombians 1 to 0. The game played at Lima was won by the Peruvians 2 to 0. Even though this meant Peru should win by the goal difference, a last game was played at the city of Caracas. With a goal at the 25th minute of the game by Hugo Sotil, Peru obtained its second international title.

=== Squad ===
Head Coach: Marcos Calderón

No.	Pos.	Player	Date of birth (age)	Caps	Club
12	GK	Eusebio Acasuzo	8 April 1952 (aged 23)		(Peru) Unión Huaral
1	GK	Ottorino Sartor	18 September 1945 (aged 29)		(Peru) Universitario
21	GK	José González Ganoza	10 July 1954 (aged 21)		(Peru) Alianza Lima
2	DF	Eleazar Soria	11 January 1948 (aged 27)		(Argentina) Independiente
4	DF	Héctor Chumpitaz	12 April 1943 (aged 32)		(Peru) Universitario
5	DF	Rubén Toribio Díaz	17 April 1952 (aged 23)		(Peru) Sporting Cristal
3	DF	Julio Meléndez	11 April 1942 (aged 33)		(Peru) Juan Aurich
13	DF	José Navarro	24 September 1948 (aged 26)		(Peru) Sporting Cristal
8	MF	Santiago Ojeda	26 April 1951 (aged 24)		(Peru) Alianza Lima
14	MF	César Cueto	6 June 1952 (aged 23)		(Peru) Alianza Lima
16	MF	José Velásquez	4 June 1952 (aged 23)		(Peru) Alianza Lima
19	MF	Raúl Párraga	2 November 1944 (aged 30)		(Peru) Sporting Cristal
17	MF	Pedro Ruiz	6 July 1947 (aged 28)		(Peru) Unión Huaral
7	MF	Alfredo Quesada	22 September 1949 (aged 25)		(Peru) Sporting Cristal
20	FW	Oswaldo Ramírez	8 April 1952 (aged 23)		(Peru) Universitario
6	MF	Percy Rojas	16 September 1949 (aged 25)		(Peru) Universitario
11	FW	Juan Carlos Oblitas	16 February 1951 (aged 24)		(Peru) Universitario
22	FW	Julio Aparicio	30 January 1955 (aged 20)		(Peru) Universitario
15	FW	Gerónimo Barbadillo	29 September 1954 (aged 20)		(Peru) Defensor Lima
18	FW	Enrique Casaretto	20 September 1945 (aged 29)		(Peru) Universitario
9	FW	Teófilo Cubillas	8 March 1949 (aged 26)		(Portugal) Porto
10	FW	Hugo Sotil	18 May 1949 (aged 26)		(Spain) Barcelona

=== Finals ===
==== First leg ====
October 16, 1975	Colombia	1 - 0	Peru	Bogotá, Colombia
	Castro 38'			Stadium: El Campín; Attendance: 50,000; Referee: Miguel Comesaña (Argentina)

Colombia	Peru

GK	Pedro Zape
RB	Arturo Segovia
CB	José Zárate
CB	Miguel A. Escobar
LB	Óscar Bolaño
RM	Diego Umaña
CM	Oswaldo Calero
CM	Eduardo Retat
LM	Carlos Rendón	Substituted off
CF	Hugo Lóndero
CF	Ponciano Castro
Substitutions:
FW	José E. Díaz	Substituted on
Manager:
Efraín Sánchez

GK	Ottorino Sartor
RB	Eleazar Soria
CB	Julio Meléndez
CB	Héctor Chumpitaz
LB	Rubén Díaz
CM	Alfredo Quesada
CM	Santiago Ojeda
CM	Percy Rojas
RW	Gerónimo Barbadillo
CF	Oswaldo Ramírez
LW	Juan Carlos Oblitas
Substitutions:
None
Manager:
Marcos Calderón

==== Second leg ====
October 22, 1975	Peru	2 - 0	Colombia	Lima, Peru
	Oblitas 18'; Ramírez 44'			Stadium: Nacional; Attendance: 50,000; Referee: Juan Silvagno (Chile)

Peru	Colombia

GK	Ottorino Sartor
RB	Eleazar Soria
CB	Julio Meléndez
CB	Héctor Chumpitaz
LB	Rubén Toribio Díaz
CM	Alfredo Quesada
CM	Santiago Ojeda
CM	Percy Rojas
RW	Gerónimo Barbadillo	Substituted off
CF	Oswaldo Ramírez
LW	Juan Carlos Oblitas
Substitutions:
MF	Pedro Ruiz	Substituted on
Manager:
Marcos Calderón

GK	Pedro Zape
RB	Arturo Segovia
CB	José Zárate
CB	Miguel A. Escobar
LB	Óscar Bolaño
RM	Diego Umaña
CM	Oswaldo Calero
CM	Eduardo Retat
LM	Jairo Arboleda
CF	Hugo Lóndero
CF	Ponciano Castro
Substitutions:
None
Manager:
Efraín Sánchez

==== Play-off ====
October 28, 1975 Playoff	Peru	1–0	Colombia	Caracas, Venezuela
	Sotil 25'			Stadium: Estadio Olimpico; Referee: Ramón Barreto (Uruguay)

Peru	Colombia

GK	Ottorino Sartor
RB	Eleazar Soria
CB	Julio Meléndez
CB	Héctor Chumpitaz
LB	Rubén Toribio Díaz
CM	Alfredo Quesada
CM	Santiago Ojeda
CM	Percy Rojas	Substituted off
RW	Teófilo Cubillas
CF	Hugo Sotil
LW	Juan Carlos Oblitas
Substitutions:
FW	Oswaldo Ramírez	Substituted on
Manager:
Marcos Calderón

GK	Pedro Zape
RB	Arturo Segovia
CB	José Zárate
CB	Miguel A. Escobar
LB	Óscar Bolaño
RM	Willington Ortiz
CM	Diego Umaña	(substituted off) 55'
CM	Oswaldo Calero
LM	Víctor Campaz
CF	Jairo Arboleda
CF	José E. Díaz	(substituted off) 85'
Substitutions:
MF	Eduardo Retat	(substituted on) 55'
FW	Ponciano Castro	(substituted on) 85'
Manager:
Efraín Sánchez

== 1979 Copa América ==
=== Squad ===
Coach: José Chiarella

No.	Pos.	Player	Date of birth (age)	Caps	Club
	GK	Eusebio Acasuzo	8 April 1952 (aged 27)		(Peru) Universitario
	DF	Héctor Chumpitaz	12 April 1944 (aged 35)		(Peru) Sporting Cristal
	DF	Rubén Toribio Díaz	17 April 1952 (aged 27)		(Peru) Sporting Cristal
	DF	Jaime Duarte	27 February 1955 (aged 24)		(Peru) Alianza Lima
	DF	José Navarro	24 September 1948 (aged 30)		(Peru) Sporting Cristal
	MF	César Cueto	16 June 1952 (aged 27)		(Colombia) Atlético Nacional
	MF	Raúl Gorriti	10 October 1956 (aged 22)		(Peru) Deportivo Municipal
	MF	Germán Leguía	2 January 1954 (aged 25)		(Peru) Universitario
	MF	Jorge Olaechea	27 August 1958 (aged 20)		(Peru) Alianza Lima
	MF	José Velásquez	4 June 1954 (aged 25)		(Colombia) Independiente Medellin
	FW	Guillermo La Rosa	6 June 1952 (aged 27)		(Peru) Alianza Lima
	FW	Ernesto Labarthe	2 June 1956 (aged 23)		(Peru) Sport Boys
	FW	Roberto Mosquera	21 August 1956 (aged 22)		(Peru) Sporting Cristal
	FW	Percy Rojas	16 September 1949 (aged 29)		(Peru) Sporting Cristal
	FW	Freddy Ravello	28 January 1955 (aged 24)		(Peru) Alianza Lima

=== Semi-finals ===
17 October 1979	Peru	1–2	Chile	Estadio Nacional, Lima
	Mosquera 71'		Caszely 36', 76'	Attendance: 50,000; Referee: Romualdo Arppi Filho (Brazil)

24 October 1979	Chile	0–0	Peru	Estadio Nacional, Santiago
				Attendance: 75,000; Referee: Juan Daniel Cardellino (Uruguay)

== Ecuador 1993 ==
Peru had an acceptable participacion in this Copa América when they passed as the leaders of their group with 4 points, 1 more point than Brazil. Paraguay and Chile also were part of this group. Peru tied with Brazil 0–0, tied with Paraguay 1–1 and beat Chile 1–0. The lead scorer for Peru in this competition was José del Solar with three goals. In quarterfinals Peru was eliminated by Mexico 4–2.

=== Squad ===
Head coach: (Federal Republic of Yugoslavia) Vladimir Popović

No.	Pos.	Player	Date of birth (age)	Caps	Club
1	GK	Miguel Miranda	13 August 1966 (aged 26)		(Peru) Sporting Cristal
2	DF	Jorge Soto	27 October 1971 (aged 21)		(Peru) Sporting Cristal
3	DF	Juan Reynoso	28 December 1969 (aged 23)		(Peru) Universitario de Deportes
4	DF	Percy Olivares	5 June 1968 (aged 25)		(Peru) Sporting Cristal
5	DF	José Soto	11 January 1970 (aged 23)		(Peru) Alianza Lima
6	MF	José Luis Carranza	8 January 1964 (aged 29)		(Peru) Universitario de Deportes
7	FW	Flavio Maestri	21 January 1973 (aged 20)		(Peru) Sporting Cristal
8	MF	José del Solar	28 November 1967 (aged 25)		(Spain) Tenerife
9	DF	Andrés González	8 April 1968 (aged 25)		(Peru) Universitario de Deportes
10	FW	Pablo Zegarra	1 April 1973 (aged 20)		(Peru) Sporting Cristal
11	FW	Julio César Rivera	12 April 1967 (aged 26)		(Peru) Sporting Cristal
12	GK	Juan Carlos Zubczuk	31 March 1965 (aged 28)		(Peru) Universitario de Deportes
13	FW	Mario Rodríguez	18 March 1972 (aged 21)		(Peru) Alianza Lima
14	MF	Roberto Martínez	3 December 1967 (aged 25)		(Peru) Universitario de Deportes
15	MF	Roberto Palacios	28 December 1972 (aged 20)		(Peru) Sporting Cristal
16	DF	César Charún	25 October 1970 (aged 22)		(Peru) Universitario de Deportes
17	DF	Darío Muchotrigo	17 December 1970 (aged 22)		(Peru) Alianza Lima
18	MF	Alvaro Barco	27 June 1967 (aged 25)		(Chile) Cobreloa
19	MF	Germán Carty	16 July 1968 (aged 24)		(Peru) Sport Boys
20	FW	Waldir Sáenz	15 May 1973 (aged 20)		(Peru) Alianza Lima
21	GK	Agapito Rodríguez	16 March 1965 (aged 28)		(Peru) Alianza Lima

=== Group stage ===
==== Group B ====
Pos	Team	Pld	W	D	L	GF	GA	GD	Pts	Qualification
1	Peru	3	1	2	0	2	1	+1	4	Advance to knockout stage
2	Brazil	3	1	1	1	5	3	+2	3	Advance to knockout stage
3	Paraguay	3	1	1	1	2	4	−2	3	Advance to knockout stage
4	Chile	3	1	0	2	3	4	−1	2	

18 June 1993	Brazil	0–0	Peru	Estadio Alejandro Serrano Aguilar, Cuenca
				Attendance: 20,000; Referee: Arturo Carter (Mexico)

21 June 1993	Paraguay	1–1	Peru	Estadio Alejandro Serrano Aguilar, Cuenca
	Monzón 37'		Del Solar 77'	Attendance: 20,000; Referee: Ángel Guevara (Ecuador)

24 June 1993	Peru	1–0	Chile	Estadio Alejandro Serrano Aguilar, Cuenca
	Del Solar 14' (pen.)			Attendance: 20,000; Referee: José Torres (Colombia)

== Bolivia 1997 ==
The team was able to reach the quarterfinals of this cup and eliminated Argentina (2:1) to advanced into the semifinals. In the semifinals, Peru faced Brazil, and lost by a margin of 7 to 0 (Peru's worst result to date). For the third place spot, Peru faced Mexico. The game was won by Mexico by a goal scored at the 82nd minute of the game.

=== Squad ===
Head coach: Freddy Ternero

No.	Pos.	Player	Date of birth (age)	Caps	Goals	Club
1	GK	Miguel Miranda	13 August 1966 (aged 30)			(Peru) Deportivo Municipal
2	DF	José Reyna	19 January 1972 (aged 25)			(Peru) Alianza Lima
3	DF	Miguel Rebosio	20 October 1976 (aged 20)			(Peru) Sporting Cristal
4	DF	Giuliano Portilla	25 May 1972 (aged 25)			(Peru) Universitario de Deportes
5	DF	Alfonso Dulanto (c)	22 July 1969 (aged 27)			(Mexico) Pumas
6	MF	Erick Torres	16 May 1975 (aged 22)			(Peru) Sporting Cristal
7	DF	Germán Muñoz	23 June 1973 (aged 23)			(Peru) Cienciano
8	MF	César Rosales	9 November 1970 (aged 26)			(Peru) Alianza Lima
9	FW	Paul Cominges	30 September 1979 (aged 17)			(Peru) Melgar
10	MF	Roberto Palacios	28 December 1972 (aged 24)			(Mexico) Puebla
11	MF	Alex Magallanes	1 March 1974 (aged 23)			(Peru) Sporting Cristal
12	GK	Juan Ángel Flores	25 February 1976 (aged 21)			(Peru) Sport Boys
13	DF	Orlando Prado	16 February 1972 (aged 25)			(Peru) Deportivo Pesquero
14	DF	Martín Hidalgo	15 June 1976 (aged 20)			(Peru) Sporting Cristal
15	MF	Aldo Cavero	24 October 1971 (aged 25)			(Peru) Cienciano
16	DF	José Luis Chacón	6 November 1971 (aged 25)			(Peru) Deportivo Pesquero
17	MF	Eddy Carazas	27 February 1974 (aged 23)			(Peru) Universitario de Deportes
18	FW	Waldir Sáenz	15 May 1973 (aged 24)			(Peru) Alianza Lima
19	MF	Marko Ciurlizza	22 February 1978 (aged 19)			(Peru) Universitario de Deportes
20	MF	Frank Palomino	1 December 1970 (aged 26)			(Peru) Melgar
21	GK	Leao Butrón	6 March 1977 (aged 20)			(Peru) Sporting Cristal
22	MF	Leonardo Uehara	8 June 1974 (aged 23)			(Peru) La Loretana

=== Group stage ===
==== Group B ====
Team	Pld	W	D	L	GF	GA	GD	Pts
Bolivia	3	3	0	0	4	0	+4	9
Peru	3	2	0	1	3	2	+1	6
Uruguay	3	1	0	2	2	2	0	3
Venezuela	3	0	0	3	0	5	−5	0

===== Peru vs Uruguay =====
12 June 1997	Peru	1–0	Uruguay	Estadio Olímpico Patria, Sucre
	Hidalgo 75'			Referee: Antonio Marrufo (Mexico)

===== Bolivia vs Peru =====
15 June 1997	Bolivia	2–0	Peru	Estadio Hernando Siles, La Paz
	Etcheverry 45'; Baldivieso 50'			Referee: Rodrigo Badilla (Costa Rica)

===== Peru vs Venezuela =====
18 June 1997	Peru	2–0	Venezuela	Estadio Olímpico Patria, Sucre
	Cominges 13', 59'			Referee: Byron Moreno (Ecuador)

=== Quarter-finals ===
21 June 1997	Peru	2–1	Argentina	Estadio Olímpico Patria, Sucre
	Carazas 30'; Hidalgo 61'		Gallardo 66' (pen.)	Referee: Byron Moreno (Ecuador)

=== Semi-finals ===
26 June 1997	Peru	0–7	Brazil	Estadio Ramón Aguilera, Santa Cruz
			Denílson 1'; Conceição 28'; Romário 36', 49'; Leonardo 45', 55'; Djalminha 77'	Referee: Rodrigo Badilla (Costa Rica)

=== Third-place match ===
28 June 1997	Mexico	1–0	Peru	Estadio Jesus Bermudez, Oruro
19:00	Hernández 82'			Referee: Paolo Borgosano (Venezuela)

== Peru 2004 ==
The 2004 Copa América, which they hosted, saw the team lose in the quarter-finals against Argentina. This began a wave of criticism against Peru's then coach Paulo Autuori, who boycotted the media, and his squad.

=== Squad ===
Head coach: (Brazil) Paulo Autuori

No.	Pos.	Player	Date of birth (age)	Caps	Goals	Club
1	GK	Óscar Ibáñez	8 August 1967 (aged 36)			(Peruvian Football Federation) Cienciano
2	DF	Santiago Acasiete	22 November 1977 (aged 26)			(Peruvian Football Federation) Cienciano
3	DF	Miguel Rebosio	20 October 1976 (aged 27)			(Royal Spanish Football Federation) Real Zaragoza
4	DF	Jorge Soto	27 October 1971 (aged 32)			(Peruvian Football Federation) Sporting Cristal
5	DF	Martín Hidalgo	15 June 1976 (aged 28)			(Peruvian Football Federation) Alianza Lima
6	DF	Walter Vílchez	20 February 1982 (aged 22)			(Peruvian Football Federation) Alianza Lima
7	MF	Nolberto Solano	12 December 1974 (aged 29)			(The Football Association) Aston Villa
8	MF	Juan Jayo	20 January 1973 (aged 31)			(Peruvian Football Federation) Alianza Lima
9	FW	Flavio Maestri	21 January 1973 (aged 31)			(Brazilian Football Confederation) Vitória
10	MF	Roberto Palacios	28 December 1972 (aged 31)			(Mexican Football Federation) Morelia
11	MF	Aldo Olcese	23 October 1974 (aged 29)			(Peruvian Football Federation) Alianza Lima
12	GK	Erick Delgado	30 June 1982 (aged 22)			(Peruvian Football Federation) Sporting Cristal
13	DF	Juan La Rosa	3 December 1980 (aged 23)			(Peruvian Football Federation) Cienciano
14	FW	Claudio Pizarro (c)	3 October 1978 (aged 25)			(German Football Association) Bayern Munich
15	DF	Guillermo Salas	10 January 1978 (aged 26)			(Peruvian Football Federation) Alianza Lima
16	FW	Andrés Mendoza	26 April 1978 (aged 26)			(Royal Belgian Football Association) Club Brugge
17	FW	Jefferson Farfán	28 October 1984 (aged 19)			(Peruvian Football Federation) Alianza Lima
18	MF	Pedro García	14 March 1974 (aged 30)			(Peruvian Football Federation) Alianza Lima
19	MF	Marko Ciurlizza	22 February 1978 (aged 26)			(Peruvian Football Federation) Alianza Lima
20	MF	Carlos Zegarra	2 March 1977 (aged 27)			(Peruvian Football Federation) Sporting Cristal
21	GK	Leao Butrón	4 June 1977 (aged 27)			(Peruvian Football Federation) Alianza Lima
22	MF	Julio García	16 June 1981 (aged 23)			(Peruvian Football Federation) Cienciano

=== Group stage ===
==== Group A ====
Team	Pld	W	D	L	GF	GA	GD	Pts
Colombia	3	2	1	0	4	2	+2	7
Peru	3	1	2	0	7	5	+2	5
Bolivia	3	0	2	1	3	4	−1	2
Venezuela	3	0	1	2	2	5	−3	1

===== Peru vs Bolivia =====
6 July 2004	Peru	2–2	Bolivia	Estadio Nacional, Lima
	Pizarro 67' (pen.); Palacios 86'		Botero 35'; Álvarez 57'	Referee: Héctor Baldassi (Argentina)

===== Peru vs Venezuela =====
9 July 2004	Peru	3–1	Venezuela	Estadio Nacional, Lima
	Farfán 34'; Solano 61'; Acasiete 72'		Margiotta 74'	Referee: Rubén Selman (Chile)

===== Peru vs Colombia =====
12 July 2004	Peru	2–2	Colombia	Estadio Mansiche, Trujillo
	Solano 58'; Maestri 60'		Congo 33'; Aguilar 53'	Referee: William Mattus (Costa Rica)

=== Quarter-finals ===
17 July 2004	Peru	0–1	Argentina	Estadio Elías Aguirre, Chiclayo
			Tevez 60'	Referee: Carlos Amarilla (Paraguay)

== Venezuela 2007 ==
Peru's campaign in the 2007 Copa América saw another futile attempt of the Peruvian squad, eliminated again in the quarter-finals by Argentina; the blame for this was mainly given to the tactics and formations of the coach Julio César Uribe, who did not call the appropriate players to the national team. After this situation, Peru replaced Uribe for José del Solar.

=== Squad ===
Head coach: Julio César Uribe

No.	Pos.	Player	Date of birth (age)	Caps	Goals	Club
1	GK	Leao Butrón	6 March 1977 (aged 30)			(Peruvian Football Federation) Universidad San Martín
2	DF	Miguel Villalta	16 June 1981 (aged 26)			(Peruvian Football Federation) Sporting Cristal
3	DF	Santiago Acasiete	22 November 1977 (aged 29)			(Royal Spanish Football Federation) Almería
4	DF	Walter Vílchez	20 February 1983 (aged 24)			(Mexican Football Federation) Cruz Azul
5	DF	Alberto Rodríguez	31 March 1984 (aged 23)			(Portuguese Football Federation) Braga
6	DF	Jhoel Herrera	9 July 1980 (aged 26)			(Peruvian Football Federation) Alianza Lima
7	MF	Jair Céspedes	22 May 1984 (aged 23)			(Peruvian Football Federation) Sport Boys
8	MF	Juan Carlos Bazalar	23 February 1968 (aged 39)			(Peruvian Football Federation) Cienciano
9	FW	Paolo Guerrero	1 January 1984 (aged 23)			(German Football Association) Hamburger SV
10	MF	Juan Carlos Mariño	2 January 1982 (aged 25)			(Peruvian Football Federation) Cienciano
11	FW	Ysrael Zúñiga	27 August 1976 (aged 30)			(Peruvian Football Federation) Melgar
12	GK	George Forsyth	20 June 1982 (aged 25)			(Peruvian Football Federation) Alianza Lima
13	DF	Paolo de la Haza	30 November 1983 (aged 23)			(Peruvian Football Federation) Cienciano
14	FW	Claudio Pizarro (c)	3 October 1978 (aged 28)			(German Football Association) Bayern Munich
15	MF	Edgar Villamarín	1 April 1983 (aged 24)			(Peruvian Football Federation) Cienciano
16	FW	Andrés Mendoza	26 April 1978 (aged 29)			(Ukrainian Association of Football) Metalurh Donetsk
17	FW	Jefferson Farfán	20 October 1984 (aged 22)			(Royal Dutch Football Association) PSV
18	MF	Pedro García	14 March 1974 (aged 33)			(Peruvian Football Federation) Universidad San Martín
19	MF	Damián Ísmodes	10 March 1989 (aged 18)			(Peruvian Football Federation) Sporting Cristal
20	FW	Roberto Jiménez	26 April 1983 (aged 24)			(Argentine Football Association) San Lorenzo
21	GK	Juan Flores	25 February 1976 (aged 31)			(Peruvian Football Federation) Cienciano
22	DF	John Galliquio	1 December 1979 (aged 27)			(Peruvian Football Federation) Universitario

=== Group stage ===
==== Group A ====
Team	Pld	W	D	L	GF	GA	GD	Pts
Venezuela	3	1	2	0	4	2	+2	5
Peru	3	1	1	1	5	4	+1	4
Uruguay	3	1	1	1	1	3	−2	4
Bolivia	3	0	2	1	4	5	−1	2

===== Uruguay vs Peru =====
26 June 2007	Uruguay	0–3	Peru	Estadio Metropolitano de Mérida, Mérida
18:05		Report	Villalta 27'; Mariño 70'; Guerrero 88'	Attendance: 23,000; Referee: Carlos Amarilla (Paraguay)

Uruguay	Peru

GK	1	Fabián Carini
RB	14	Carlos Diogo
CB	2	Diego Lugano (c)	(yellow card) 44'
CB	3	Diego Godín
LB	6	Darío Rodríguez	(yellow card) 59'
DM	5	Pablo García
RM	15	Diego Pérez
LM	11	Fabián Estoyanoff		(substituted off) 80'
AM	18	Fabián Canobbio		(substituted off) 46'
FW	21	Diego Forlán
FW	22	Vicente Sánchez		(substituted off) 66'
Substitutions:
MF	7	Cristian Rodríguez		(substituted on) 46'
FW	13	Sebastián Abreu		(substituted on) 66'
MF	9	Gonzalo Vargas		(substituted on) 80'
Manager:
Óscar Tabárez

GK	1	Leao Butrón
RB	22	John Galliquio
CB	2	Miguel Villalta
CB	3	Santiago Acasiete
CB	5	Alberto Rodríguez
LB	4	Walter Vílchez
CM	18	Pedro García	(yellow card) 51'	(substituted off) 55'
CM	8	Juan Carlos Bazalar
CAM	17	Jefferson Farfán		(substituted off) 80'
FW	9	Paolo Guerrero	(yellow card) 55'
FW	14	Claudio Pizarro (c)		(substituted off) 77'
Substitutions:
MF	10	Juan Carlos Mariño	(yellow card) 90'	(substituted on) 55'
FW	16	Andrés Mendoza		(substituted on) 77'
DF	13	Paolo de la Haza		(substituted on) 80'
Manager:
Julio César Uribe

===== Venezuela vs Peru =====
30 June 2007	Venezuela	2–0	Peru	Estadio Polideportivo de Pueblo Nuevo, San Cristóbal
18:20	Cichero 48'; Arismendi 79'	Report		Attendance: 40,000; Referee: Benito Archundia (Mexico)

Venezuela	Peru

GK	1	Renny Vega
RB	20	Héctor González
CB	3	José Manuel Rey
CB	6	Alejandro Cichero	(yellow card) 90+3'
LB	21	Andrés Rouga	(yellow card) 17'	(substituted off) 37'
CM	5	Miguel Mea Vitali
CM	8	Luis Vera (c)
CM	11	Ricardo Páez	(yellow card) 56' (yellow-red card) 78'
AM	18	Juan Arango		(substituted off) 74'
FW	9	Giancarlo Maldonado	(yellow card) 14'
FW	15	Fernando de Ornelas		(substituted off) 63'
Substitutions:
MF	16	Edder Pérez		(substituted on) 37'
DF	19	Daniel Arismendi		(substituted on) 63'
MF	10	César González		(substituted on) 74'
Manager:
Richard Páez

GK	1	Leao Butrón
RB	22	John Galliquio		(substituted off) 75'
CB	2	Miguel Villalta		(substituted off) 51'
CB	3	Santiago Acasiete
CB	5	Alberto Rodríguez	(yellow card) 53'
LB	4	Walter Vílchez
CM	18	Pedro García
CM	8	Juan Carlos Bazalar
CAM	17	Jefferson Farfán
FW	9	Paolo Guerrero
FW	14	Claudio Pizarro (c)		(substituted off) 67'
Substitutions:
MF	10	Juan Carlos Mariño		(substituted on) 51'
MF	19	Damián Ísmodes		(substituted on) 67'
FW	16	Andrés Mendoza		(substituted on) 75'
Manager:
Julio César Uribe

===== Peru vs Bolivia =====
3 July 2007	Peru	2–2	Bolivia	Estadio Metropolitano de Mérida, Mérida
18:35	Pizarro 34', 85'	Report	Moreno 24'; Campos 45'	Attendance: 42,000; Referee: Carlos Chandía (Chile)

Peru	Bolivia

GK	1	Leao Butrón
RB	22	John Galliquio		(substituted off) 55'
CB	5	Alberto Rodríguez	(yellow card) 73'
CB	15	Edgar Villamarín
LB	4	Walter Vílchez
DM	13	Paolo de la Haza	(yellow card) 44'
RM	10	Juan Carlos Mariño
LM	19	Damián Ísmodes		(substituted off) 70'
AM	17	Jefferson Farfán	(yellow card) 24'	(substituted off) 46'
FW	9	Paolo Guerrero
FW	14	Claudio Pizarro (c)
Substitutions:
FW	11	Ysrael Zúñiga	(yellow card) 90+2'	(substituted on) 46'
DF	6	Jhoel Herrera	(yellow card) 76' (yellow-red card) 78'	(substituted on) 55'
FW	20	Roberto Jiménez	(yellow card) 87'	(substituted on) 70'
Manager:
Julio César Uribe

GK	1	Hugo Suárez
RB	14	Miguel Ángel Hoyos
CB	16	Ronald Raldes	(yellow card) 60'
CB	2	Juan Manuel Peña (c)	(yellow card) 90+1'
LB	4	Lorgio Álvarez
RM	8	Gualberto Mojica		(substituted off) 80'
CM	5	Leonel Reyes	(yellow card) 84'
LM	21	Jhasmani Campos		(substituted off) 67'
AM	10	Joselito Vaca
FW	19	Augusto Andaveris		(substituted off) 58'
FW	9	Jaime Moreno
Substitutions:
FW	17	Juan Carlos Arce		(substituted on) 58'
MF	18	Gonzalo Galindo	(yellow card) 84'	(substituted on) 67'
DF	15	Jorge Ortiz		(substituted on) 80'
Manager:
Erwin Sánchez

=== Quarter-finals ===
8 July 2007	Argentina	4–0	Peru	Estadio Metropolitano de Fútbol de Lara, Barquisimeto
18:50	Riquelme 47', 85'; Messi 61'; Mascherano 75'	Report		Attendance: 38,800; Referee: Carlos Simon (Brazil)

Argentina	Peru

GK	1	Roberto Abbondanzieri
RB	8	Javier Zanetti
CB	2	Roberto Ayala (c)	(yellow card) 15'
CB	15	Gabriel Milito
LB	6	Gabriel Heinze
CM	19	Esteban Cambiasso		(substituted off) 83'
CM	20	Juan Sebastián Verón		(substituted off) 71'
CM	14	Javier Mascherano
AM	18	Lionel Messi
AM	10	Juan Román Riquelme
CF	21	Diego Milito		(substituted off) 46'
Substitutions:
FW	11	Carlos Tevez		(substituted on) 46'
MF	5	Fernando Gago		(substituted on) 71'
MF	16	Pablo Aimar		(substituted on) 83'
Manager:
Alfio Basile

GK	1	Leao Butrón
CB	2	Miguel Villalta
CB	3	Santiago Acasiete	(yellow card) 1'
CB	15	Edgar Villamarín		(substituted off) 64'
RM	22	John Galliquio
CM	10	Juan Carlos Mariño		(substituted off) 74'
CM	8	Juan Carlos Bazalar
LM	4	Walter Vílchez
AM	13	Paolo de la Haza	(yellow card) 30'
CF	9	Paolo Guerrero		(substituted off) 55'
CF	14	Claudio Pizarro (c)
Substitutions:
MF	18	Pedro García		(substituted on) 55'
FW	11	Ysrael Zúñiga		(substituted on) 64'
FW	16	Andrés Mendoza		(substituted on) 74'
Manager:
Julio César Uribe

== Argentina 2011 ==
Peru made its debut against Uruguay, with a 1–1 draw, with Paolo Guerrero scoring for Peru. A 1–0 win over Mexico came next and finally a 1–0 loss against Chile, which it suffered due to a 90th minute own goal of a corner kick, would qualify Peru to the next round. At the quarter-finals match, Peru faced Colombia. All analysts placed Colombia as the big favorites. Peru, however, managed to win 2–0 after extra time with goals from Carlos Lobatón and Juan Manuel Vargas. At the semi-finals, Peru lost against the eventual champion Uruguay. Peru moved on to the third place match against the other surprise of the tournament, Venezuela. Peru beat Venezuela thoroughly with a 4–1 victory. A hat-trick by Paolo Guerrero, the Peruvian star of the tournament, fueled Peru and allowed them to claim the third-place bronze medal at the Copa América. Paolo Guerrero was crowned as the top goal scorer of the tournament.

=== Squad ===
Head coach: (Uruguay) Sergio Markarián

No.	Pos.	Player	Date of birth (age)	Caps	Goals	Club
1	GK	Raúl Fernández	6 October 1985 (aged 25)	8	0	(Peruvian Football Federation) Universitario de Deportes
2	DF	Alberto Rodríguez	31 March 1984 (aged 27)	32	0	(Portuguese Football Federation) Braga
3	DF	Santiago Acasiete	22 October 1977 (aged 33)	33	2	(Royal Spanish Football Federation) Almería
4	DF	Walter Vílchez	20 February 1982 (aged 29)	55	1	(Peruvian Football Federation) Sporting Cristal
5	MF	Adán Balbín	13 October 1986 (aged 24)	5	0	(Peruvian Football Federation) Universidad San Martín
6	FW	Juan Manuel Vargas (captain)	5 October 1983 (aged 27)	31	3	(Italian Football Federation) Fiorentina
7	MF	Josepmir Ballón	21 March 1988 (aged 23)	14	0	(Argentine Football Association) River Plate
8	MF	Michael Guevara	10 June 1984 (aged 27)	4	0	(Peruvian Football Federation) Sport Boys
9	FW	Paolo Guerrero	1 January 1984 (aged 27)	29	10	(German Football Association) Hamburger SV
10	MF	Rinaldo Cruzado	21 September 1984 (aged 26)	17	0	(Peruvian Football Federation) Juan Aurich
11	MF	Carlos Lobatón	6 February 1980 (aged 31)	9	0	(Peruvian Football Federation) Sporting Cristal
12	GK	Salomón Libman	25 February 1984 (aged 27)	4	0	(Peruvian Football Federation) Alianza Lima
13	DF	Renzo Revoredo	11 May 1986 (aged 25)	6	0	(Peruvian Football Federation) Universitario de Deportes
14	FW	Raúl Ruidíaz	25 July 1990 (aged 20)	3	0	(Peruvian Football Federation) Universitario de Deportes
15	DF	Aldo Corzo	20 May 1989 (aged 22)	4	0	(Peruvian Football Federation) Universidad San Martín
16	FW	Luis Advíncula	2 March 1990 (aged 21)	10	0	(Peruvian Football Federation) Sporting Cristal
17	DF	Giancarlo Carmona	8 October 1985 (aged 25)	2	0	(Argentine Football Association) San Lorenzo
18	FW	William Chiroque	10 March 1980 (aged 31)	8	0	(Peruvian Football Federation) Juan Aurich
19	DF	Yoshimar Yotún	7 April 1990 (aged 21)	3	0	(Peruvian Football Federation) Sporting Cristal
20	FW	André Carrillo	14 June 1991 (aged 20)	1	0	(Peruvian Football Federation) Alianza Lima
21	DF	Christian Ramos	4 November 1988 (aged 22)	10	0	(Peruvian Football Federation) Alianza Lima
22	MF	Antonio Gonzales	16 May 1986 (aged 25)	4	0	(Peruvian Football Federation) Universitario de Deportes
23	GK	Leao Butrón	6 March 1977 (aged 34)	36	0	(Peruvian Football Federation) Universidad San Martín

=== Group stage ===
==== Group C ====
Team	Pld	W	D	L	GF	GA	GD	Pts
Chile	3	2	1	0	4	2	+2	7
Uruguay	3	1	2	0	3	2	+1	5
Peru	3	1	1	1	2	2	0	4
Mexico	3	0	0	3	1	4	−3	0

===== Uruguay vs Peru =====
4 July 2011	Uruguay	1–1	Peru	Estadio del Bicentenario, San Juan
19:15	Suárez 45'	Report	Guerrero 23'	Referee: Wilmar Roldán (Colombia)

Uruguay	Peru

GK	1	Fernando Muslera
RB	16	Maxi Pereira
CB	2	Diego Lugano (c)
CB	6	Mauricio Victorino
LB	22	Martín Cáceres	(yellow card) 81'
RM	15	Diego Pérez
CM	17	Egidio Arévalo Ríos
LM	14	Nicolás Lodeiro		(substituted off) 78'
RW	10	Diego Forlán
LW	21	Edinson Cavani		(substituted off) 78'
CF	9	Luis Suárez
Substitutions:
MF	7	Cristian Rodríguez		(substituted on) 78'
FW	18	Abel Hernández		(substituted on) 78'
Manager:
Óscar Tabárez

GK	1	Raúl Fernández
RB	13	Renzo Revoredo
CB	3	Santiago Acasiete	(yellow card) 50'
CB	2	Alberto Rodríguez
LB	4	Walter Vílchez (c)
DM	5	Adan Balbín
CM	8	Michael Guevara		(substituted off) 57'
CM	10	Rinaldo Cruzado	(yellow card) 81'
RW	16	Luis Advíncula		(substituted off) 90+1'
LW	19	Yoshimar Yotún		(substituted off) 59'
CF	9	Paolo Guerrero	(yellow card) 24'
Substitutions:
MF	11	Carlos Lobatón		(substituted on) 57'
MF	6	Juan Manuel Vargas	(yellow card) 83'	(substituted on) 59'
FW	18	William Chiroque		(substituted on) 90+1'
Manager:
Sergio Markarián (Uruguay)

===== Peru vs Mexico =====
8 July 2011	Peru	1–0	Mexico	Estadio Malvinas Argentinas, Mendoza
21:45	Guerrero 82'	Report		Referee: Sergio Pezzotta (Argentina)

Peru	Mexico

GK	1	Raúl Fernández
RB	17	Giancarlo Carmona
CB	3	Santiago Acasiete
CB	2	Alberto Rodríguez
LB	4	Walter Vílchez
RM	5	Adán Balbín
CM	10	Rinaldo Cruzado	(substituted off) 76'
CM	11	Carlos Lobatón	(substituted off) 85'
LM	6	Juan Manuel Vargas (c)
CF	9	Paolo Guerrero
CF	16	Luis Advíncula	(substituted off) 46'
Substitutions:
DF	19	Yoshimar Yotún	(substituted on) 46'
MF	8	Michael Guevara	(substituted on) 76'
MF	7	Josepmir Ballón	(substituted on) 85'
Manager:
Sergio Markarián (Uruguay)

GK	1	Luis Ernesto Michel (c)
RB	22	Paul Aguilar		(substituted off) 46'
CB	14	Néstor Araujo
CB	19	Héctor Reynoso	(yellow card) 71'
CB	21	Hiram Mier	(yellow card) 58'
LB	5	Dárvin Chávez		(substituted off) 73'
RM	23	Diego Antonio Reyes
CM	11	Javier Aquino		(substituted off) 85'
LM	15	Jorge Enríquez
CF	10	Giovani dos Santos
CF	9	Rafael Márquez Lugo
Substitutions:
MF	17	Édgar Pacheco		(substituted on) 46'
DF	16	Miguel Ángel Ponce		(substituted on) 73'
FW	18	Oribe Peralta		(substituted on) 85'
Manager:
Luis Fernando Tena

===== Chile vs Peru =====
12 July 2011	Chile	1–0	Peru	Estadio Malvinas Argentinas, Mendoza
19:15	Carrillo 90+2' (o.g.)	Report		Referee: Sálvio Fagundes (Brazil)

Chile	Peru

GK	12	Miguel Pinto
CB	3	Waldo Ponce
CB	18	Gonzalo Jara
CB	13	Marco Estrada	(yellow card) 87'
RM	16	Gonzalo Fierro		(substituted off) 57'
CM	6	Carlos Carmona
CM	2	Francisco Silva		(substituted off) 77'
LM	15	Jean Beausejour	(red card) 61'
AM	11	Luis Jiménez
CF	9	Humberto Suazo (c)
CF	22	Esteban Paredes		(substituted off) 57'
Substitutions:
FW	7	Alexis Sánchez		(substituted on) 57'
MF	10	Jorge Valdivia	(yellow card) 90+3'	(substituted on) 57'
MF	17	Gary Medel		(substituted on) 77'
Manager:
Claudio Borghi (Argentina)

GK	12	Salomón Libman	(yellow card) 82'
RB	13	Renzo Revoredo	(yellow card) 21'
CB	21	Christian Ramos	(yellow card) 60'
CB	3	Santiago Acasiete (c)		(substituted off) 46'
CB	17	Giancarlo Carmona	(red card) 61'
LB	15	Aldo Corzo	(yellow card) 11'
DM	22	Antonio Gonzales		(substituted off) 76'
RM	7	Josepmir Ballón
LM	8	Michael Guevara		(substituted off) 69'
CF	18	William Chiroque
CF	14	Raúl Ruidíaz
Substitutions:
DF	4	Walter Vílchez		(substituted on) 46'
MF	11	Carlos Lobatón		(substituted on) 69'
FW	20	André Carrillo		(substituted on) 76'
Manager:
Sergio Markarián (Uruguay)

=== Quarter-finals ===
16 July 2011	Colombia	0–2	Peru	Estadio Mario Alberto Kempes, Córdoba
16:00		Report	Lobatón 101'; Vargas 111'	Referee: Francisco Chacón (Mexico)

Colombia	Peru

GK	12	Neco Martínez
RB	18	Juan Camilo Zúñiga
CB	14	Luis Amaranto Perea
CB	3	Mario Yepes (c)
LB	7	Pablo Armero
CM	13	Fredy Guarín
CM	6	Carlos Sánchez	(yellow card) 98'	(substituted off) 111'
CM	8	Abel Aguilar		(substituted off) 105'
RW	17	Dayro Moreno
LW	20	Adrián Ramos		(substituted off) 72'
CF	9	Radamel Falcao
Substitutions:
FW	11	Hugo Rodallega		(substituted on) 72'
FW	19	Teófilo Gutiérrez		(substituted on) 105'
FW	21	Jackson Martínez		(substituted on) 111'
Manager:
Hernán Darío Gómez

GK	1	Raúl Fernández
RB	13	Renzo Revoredo
CB	21	Christian Ramos
CB	2	Alberto Rodríguez	(yellow card) 65'
LB	4	Walter Vílchez (c)
RM	5	Adan Balbin
CM	10	Rinaldo Cruzado		(substituted off) 117'
LM	6	Juan Manuel Vargas
RW	18	William Chiroque		(substituted off) 95'
LW	16	Luis Advíncula	(yellow card) 1'	(substituted off) 46'
CF	9	Paolo Guerrero
Substitutions:
MF	11	Carlos Lobatón		(substituted on) 46'
DF	19	Yoshimar Yotún		(substituted on) 95'
MF	7	Josepmir Ballón		(substituted on) 117'
Manager:
Sergio Markarián (Uruguay)

=== Semi-finals ===
19 July 2011	Peru	0–2	Uruguay	Estadio Ciudad de La Plata, La Plata
21:45		Report	Suárez 52', 57'	Referee: Raúl Orosco (Bolivia)

Peru	Uruguay

GK	1	Raúl Fernández
RB	17	Giancarlo Carmona
CB	3	Santiago Acasiete
CB	2	Alberto Rodríguez
LB	4	Walter Vílchez
RM	16	Luis Advíncula		(substituted off) 60'
CM	19	Yoshimar Yotún	(yellow card) 1'	(substituted off) 53'
CM	5	Adán Balbín	(yellow card) 59'	(substituted off) 90'
CM	10	Rinaldo Cruzado
LM	6	Juan Manuel Vargas (c)	(red card) 68'
CF	9	Paolo Guerrero
Substitutions:
FW	18	William Chiroque		(substituted on) 53'
MF	11	Carlos Lobatón	(yellow card) 74'	(substituted on) 60'
MF	7	Josepmir Ballón		(substituted on) 90'
Manager:
Sergio Markarian (Uruguay)

GK	1	Fernando Muslera
RB	16	Maxi Pereira
CB	2	Diego Lugano (c)	(yellow card) 66'
CB	4	Sebastián Coates
LB	22	Martín Cáceres
RM	20	Álvaro González
CM	5	Walter Gargano	(yellow card) 26'	(substituted off) 70'
CM	17	Egidio Arévalo Ríos
LM	11	Álvaro Pereira
CF	10	Diego Forlán
CF	9	Luis Suárez	(yellow card) 12'	(substituted off) 70'
Substitutions:
MF	8	Sebastián Eguren		(substituted on) 70'
FW	18	Abel Hernández		(substituted on) 70'
Manager:
Óscar Tabárez

=== Third-place play-off ===
23 July 2011	Peru	4–1	Venezuela	Estadio Ciudad de La Plata, La Plata
16:00	Chiroque 41'; Guerrero 63', 89', 90+2'	Report	Arango 77'	Referee: Wilmar Roldán (Colombia)

Peru	Venezuela

GK	1	Raúl Fernández
RB	13	Renzo Revoredo
CB	21	Christian Ramos
CB	2	Alberto Rodríguez
LB	15	Aldo Corzo
RM	5	Adán Balbín	(yellow card) 66'
CM	11	Carlos Lobatón		(substituted off) 60'
LM	10	Rinaldo Cruzado	(yellow card) 37'	(substituted off) 78'
RW	18	William Chiroque
LW	19	Yoshimar Yotún
CF	9	Paolo Guerrero (c)
Substitutions:
MF	8	Michael Guevara		(substituted on) 60'
FW	16	Luis Advíncula		(substituted on) 78'
Manager:
Sergio Markarian (Uruguay)

GK	1	Renny Vega
RB	16	Roberto Rosales
CB	3	José Manuel Rey	(yellow card) 49'
CB	4	Oswaldo Vizcarrondo
LB	6	Gabriel Cichero	(yellow card) 84'
DM	8	Tomás Rincón (c)	(red card) 58'
RM	11	César González		(substituted off) 67'
LM	13	Luis Seijas		(substituted off) 46'
AM	10	Yohandry Orozco
CF	9	Giancarlo Maldonado	(yellow card) 86'
CF	7	Miku		(substituted off) 61'
Substitutions:
MF	14	Franklin Lucena		(substituted on) 46'
FW	23	Salomón Rondón		(substituted on) 61'
MF	18	Juan Arango		(substituted on) 67'
Manager:
César Farías

== Chile 2015 ==
The Peruvian team was one of the 12 participating teams in the 2015 Copa América, a tournament that took place between June 11 and July 4, 2015, in Chile. The Peruvian team played his thirtieth Copa América and the fifteenth consecutive. In the draw held on November 24, 2014, in Viña del Mar, Peru was paired in Group C along with Brazil, Colombia and Venezuela. Peru's debut in the competition occurred on June 14, 2015, losing 2:1 to Brazil. Four days later he got his first victory by defeating Venezuela by a score of 1:0. Peru closed its participation in the first phase with a goalless draw against Colombia. Peru added four points which allowed them to occupy second place in their group and advance to the next phase. In the quarterfinals, they faced the Bolivian team, which they won 3:1 with 3 goals from Paolo Guerrero. In the next round they faced the Chilean team, where the locals were victorious 2:1 with two goals from Eduardo Vargas. In the match for third place, the Peruvian team faced Paraguay, the match ended with a 2:0 victory, with goals from André Carrillo and Paolo Guerrero.

=== Squad ===
Head coach: (Argentina) Ricardo Gareca

No.	Pos.	Player	Date of birth (age)	Caps	Goals	Club
1	GK	Pedro Gallese	23 February 1990 (aged 25)	6	0	(Peruvian Football Federation) Juan Aurich
2	DF	Jair Céspedes	22 May 1984 (aged 31)	4	0	(Peruvian Football Federation) Juan Aurich
3	DF	Hansell Riojas	15 October 1991 (aged 23)	3	0	(Peruvian Football Federation) Universidad César Vallejo
4	DF	Pedro Requena	24 January 1991 (aged 24)	2	0	(Peruvian Football Federation) Universidad César Vallejo
5	DF	Carlos Zambrano	10 July 1989 (aged 25)	29	4	(German Football Association) Eintracht Frankfurt
6	MF	Juan Manuel Vargas	5 October 1983 (aged 31)	53	4	(Italian Football Federation) Fiorentina
7	MF	Paolo Hurtado	27 July 1990 (aged 24)	15	2	(Portuguese Football Federation) Paços de Ferreira
8	MF	Christian Cueva	23 November 1991 (aged 23)	7	0	(Peruvian Football Federation) Alianza Lima
9	FW	Paolo Guerrero	1 January 1984 (aged 31)	56	21	(Brazilian Football Confederation) Corinthians
10	FW	Jefferson Farfán	26 October 1984 (aged 30)	64	17	(German Football Association) Schalke 04
11	FW	Yordy Reyna	17 September 1993 (aged 21)	8	2	(German Football Association) RB Leipzig
12	GK	Diego Penny	22 April 1984 (aged 31)	14	0	(Peruvian Football Federation) Sporting Cristal
13	MF	Edwin Retamoso	23 February 1982 (aged 33)	11	0	(Peruvian Football Federation) Real Garcilaso
14	FW	Claudio Pizarro (captain)	3 October 1978 (aged 36)	76	19	(German Football Association) Bayern Munich
15	DF	Christian Ramos	4 November 1988 (aged 26)	39	1	(Peruvian Football Federation) Juan Aurich
16	MF	Carlos Lobatón	6 February 1980 (aged 35)	33	1	(Peruvian Football Federation) Sporting Cristal
17	DF	Luis Advíncula	2 March 1990 (aged 25)	41	0	(Portuguese Football Federation) Vitória de Setúbal
18	FW	André Carrillo	14 June 1991 (aged 23)	23	1	(Portuguese Football Federation) Sporting CP
19	DF	Yoshimar Yotún	7 April 1990 (aged 25)	39	1	(Swedish Football Association) Malmö FF
20	MF	Joel Sánchez	11 June 1989 (aged 26)	2	0	(Peruvian Football Federation) Universidad San Martín
21	MF	Josepmir Ballón	21 March 1988 (aged 27)	35	0	(Peruvian Football Federation) Sporting Cristal
22	MF	Carlos Ascues	6 June 1992 (aged 23)	6	5	(Peruvian Football Federation) Melgar
23	GK	Salomón Libman	25 February 1984 (aged 31)	6	0	(Peruvian Football Federation) Universidad César Vallejo

=== Group stage ===
==== Group C ====
Pos	Team	Pld	W	D	L	GF	GA	GD	Pts	Qualification
1	Brazil	3	2	0	1	4	3	+1	6	Advance to knockout stage
2	Peru	3	1	1	1	2	2	0	4	Advance to knockout stage
3	Colombia	3	1	1	1	1	1	0	4	Advance to knockout stage
4	Venezuela	3	1	0	2	2	3	−1	3	

Source: CONMEBOL
Rules for classification: Tie-breaking criteria

===== Brazil vs Peru =====
14 June 2015	Brazil	2–1	Peru	Estadio Municipal Germán Becker, Temuco
18:30	Neymar 4'; Douglas Costa 90+1'	Report	Cueva 2'	Attendance: 16,342; Referee: Roberto García (Mexico)

Brazil	Peru

GK	1	Jefferson
RB	2	Dani Alves
CB	3	Miranda
CB	4	David Luiz
LB	6	Filipe Luís	(yellow card) 58'
CM	8	Elias
CM	5	Fernandinho
RM	19	Willian		(substituted off) 87'
AM	10	Neymar (c)	(yellow card) 45'
LM	17	Fred		(substituted off) 74'
CF	9	Diego Tardelli		(substituted off) 66'
Substitutions:
MF	7	Douglas Costa		(substituted on) 66'
MF	11	Roberto Firmino		(substituted on) 74'
MF	18	Éverton Ribeiro		(substituted on) 87'
Manager:
Dunga

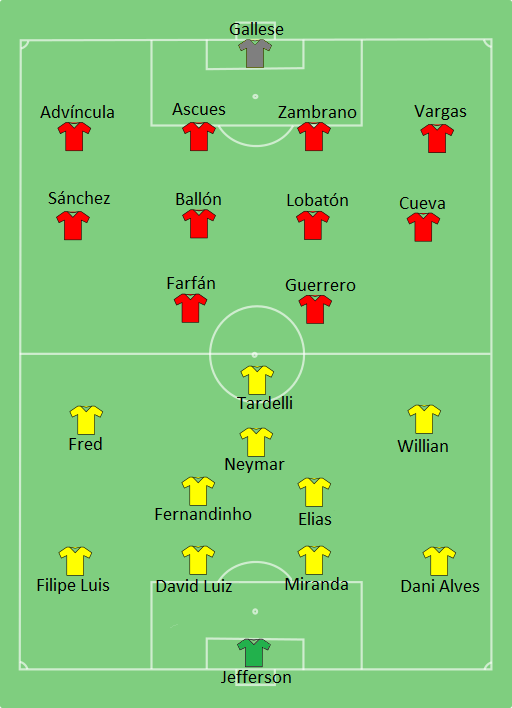

GK	1	Pedro Gallese
RB	17	Luis Advíncula
CB	22	Carlos Ascues
CB	5	Carlos Zambrano
LB	6	Juan Manuel Vargas	(yellow card) 83'	(substituted off) 89'
RM	20	Joel Sánchez
CM	21	Josepmir Ballón
CM	16	Carlos Lobatón (c)
LM	8	Christian Cueva		(substituted off) 82'
CF	10	Jefferson Farfán		(substituted off) 82'
CF	9	Paolo Guerrero	(yellow card) 30'
Substitutions:
FW	11	Yordy Reyna		(substituted on) 82'
FW	18	André Carrillo		(substituted on) 82'
DF	19	Yoshimar Yotún		(substituted on) 89'
Manager:
(Argentina) Ricardo Gareca

===== Peru vs Venezuela =====
18 June 2015	Peru	1–0	Venezuela	Estadio Elías Figueroa, Valparaíso
20:30	Pizarro 71'	Report		Attendance: 15,542; Referee: Raúl Orosco (Bolivia)

Peru	Venezuela

GK	1	Pedro Gallese
RB	17	Luis Advíncula
CB	5	Carlos Zambrano
CB	22	Carlos Ascues
LB	6	Juan Manuel Vargas
RM	20	Joel Sánchez
CM	21	Josepmir Ballón	(yellow card) 35'
CM	16	Carlos Lobatón	(yellow card) 37'	(substituted off) 46'
LM	8	Christian Cueva		(substituted off) 83'
CF	14	Claudio Pizarro (c)	(yellow card) 69'	(substituted off) 89'
CF	9	Paolo Guerrero
Substitutions:
FW	11	Yordy Reyna		(substituted on) 46'
MF	7	Paolo Hurtado		(substituted on) 83'
DF	19	Yoshimar Yotún		(substituted on) 89'
Manager:
(Argentina) Ricardo Gareca

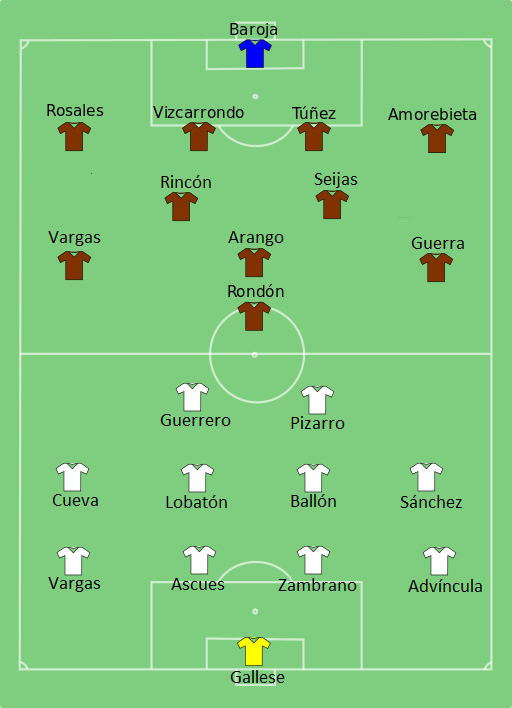

GK	1	Alain Baroja
RB	16	Roberto Rosales
CB	4	Oswaldo Vizcarrondo
CB	3	Andrés Túñez
LB	5	Fernando Amorebieta	(red card) 30'
CM	8	Tomás Rincón
CM	13	Luis Manuel Seijas		(substituted off) 82'
RM	10	Ronald Vargas		(substituted off) 37'
AM	18	Juan Arango (c)		(substituted off) 73'
LM	15	Alejandro Guerra
CF	9	Salomón Rondón
Substitutions:
DF	6	Gabriel Cichero	(yellow card) 88'	(substituted on) 37'
FW	17	Josef Martínez		(substituted on) 73'
FW	7	Miku		(substituted on) 82'
Manager:
Noel Sanvicente

===== Colombia vs Peru =====
21 June 2015	Colombia	0–0	Peru	Estadio Municipal Germán Becker, Temuco
16:00		Report		Attendance: 17,231; Referee: Néstor Pitana (Argentina)

Colombia	Peru

GK	1	David Ospina
RB	4	Santiago Arias
CB	2	Cristián Zapata	(yellow card) 8'
CB	22	Jeison Murillo
LB	7	Pablo Armero		(substituted off) 57'
RM	11	Juan Cuadrado
CM	5	Edwin Valencia		(substituted off) 24'
CM	6	Carlos Sánchez	(yellow card) 64'
LM	10	James Rodríguez
CF	9	Radamel Falcao (c)		(substituted off) 65'
CF	19	Teófilo Gutiérrez
Substitutions:
MF	15	Alexander Mejía		(substituted on) 24'
FW	16	Víctor Ibarbo		(substituted on) 57'
FW	21	Jackson Martínez		(substituted on) 65'
Manager:
(Argentina) José Pékerman

GK	1	Pedro Gallese
RB	17	Luis Advíncula
CB	5	Carlos Zambrano
CB	22	Carlos Ascues
LB	6	Juan Manuel Vargas
RM	20	Joel Sánchez		(substituted off) 81'
CM	21	Josepmir Ballón	(yellow card) 33'
CM	16	Carlos Lobatón	(yellow card) 79'
LM	8	Christian Cueva		(substituted off) 90'
CF	14	Claudio Pizarro (c)		(substituted off) 56'
CF	9	Paolo Guerrero
Substitutions:
FW	10	Jefferson Farfán	(yellow card) 90+1'	(substituted on) 56'
MF	7	Paolo Hurtado		(substituted on) 81'
DF	19	Yoshimar Yotún		(substituted on) 90'
Manager:
(Argentina) Ricardo Gareca

=== Quarter-finals ===
25 June 2015	Bolivia	1–3	Peru	Estadio Municipal Germán Becker, Temuco
20:30	Moreno 83' (pen.)	Report	Guerrero 19', 22', 73'	Attendance: 16,872; Referee: Wilmar Roldán (Colombia)

Bolivia	Peru

GK	1	Romel Quiñónez
CB	22	Edward Zenteno
CB	16	Ronald Raldes (c)
CB	21	Cristian Coimbra	(yellow card) 76'
RWB	2	Miguel Hurtado		(substituted off) 46'
LWB	4	Leonel Morales		(substituted off) 46'
RM	3	Alejandro Chumacero
CM	6	Danny Bejarano	(yellow card) 35'
LM	8	Martin Smedberg-Dalence
CF	7	Alcides Peña		(substituted off) 68'
CF	9	Marcelo Moreno	(yellow card) 86'
Substitutions:
FW	10	Pablo Escobar	(yellow card) 69'	(substituted on) 46'
MF	11	Damián Lizio		(substituted on) 46'
FW	18	Ricardo Pedriel	(yellow card) 73'	(substituted on) 68'
Manager:
Mauricio Soria

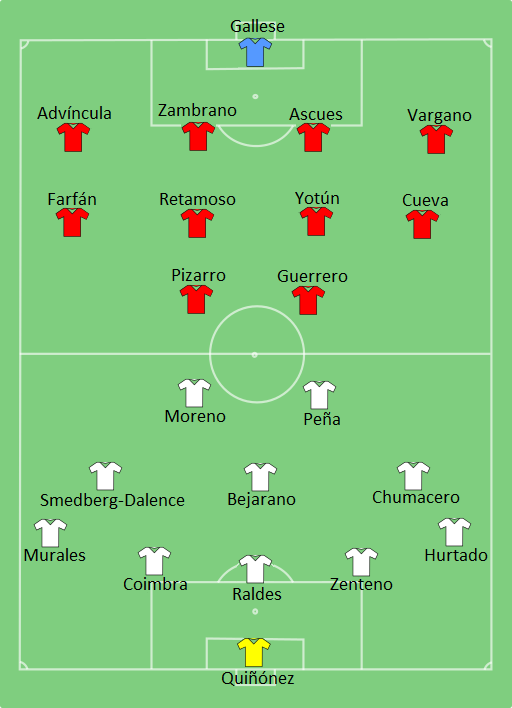

GK	1	Pedro Gallese	(yellow card) 61'
RB	17	Luis Advíncula	(yellow card) 32'
CB	5	Carlos Zambrano
CB	22	Carlos Ascues
LB	6	Juan Manuel Vargas
RM	10	Jefferson Farfán		(substituted off) 77'
CM	13	Edwin Retamoso
CM	19	Yoshimar Yotún	(yellow card) 89'
LM	8	Christian Cueva		(substituted off) 82'
CF	14	Claudio Pizarro (c)		(substituted off) 66'
CF	9	Paolo Guerrero
Substitutions:
FW	18	André Carrillo		(substituted on) 66'
MF	7	Paolo Hurtado		(substituted on) 77'
FW	11	Yordy Reyna	(yellow card) 90+4'	(substituted on) 82'
Manager:
(Argentina) Ricardo Gareca

=== Semi-finals ===
29 June 2015	Chile	2–1	Peru	Estadio Nacional, Santiago
20:30	Vargas 41', 63'	Report	Medel 60' (o.g.)	Attendance: 45,651; Referee: José Argote (Venezuela)

Chile	Peru

GK	1	Claudio Bravo (c)
RB	4	Mauricio Isla
CB	17	Gary Medel
CB	13	José Rojas
LB	3	Miiko Albornoz	(substituted off) 46'
RM	8	Arturo Vidal
CM	21	Marcelo Díaz	(substituted off) 46'
LM	20	Charles Aránguiz
AM	10	Jorge Valdivia	(substituted off) 86'
CF	11	Eduardo Vargas
CF	7	Alexis Sánchez
Substitutions:
DF	2	Eugenio Mena	(substituted on) 46'
MF	16	David Pizarro	(substituted on) 46'
MF	19	Felipe Gutiérrez	(substituted on) 86'
Manager:
(Argentina) Jorge Sampaoli

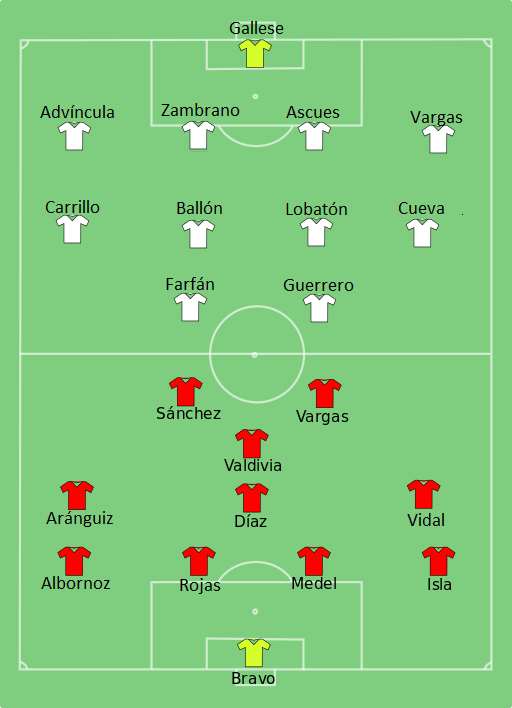

GK	1	Pedro Gallese
RB	17	Luis Advíncula
CB	5	Carlos Zambrano	(yellow card) 7'	(red card) 21'
CB	22	Carlos Ascues
LB	6	Juan Manuel Vargas
RM	18	André Carrillo		(substituted off) 73'
CM	21	Josepmir Ballón
CM	16	Carlos Lobatón (c)		(substituted off) 74'
LM	8	Christian Cueva		(substituted off) 29'
CF	10	Jefferson Farfán
CF	9	Paolo Guerrero
Substitutions:
DF	15	Christian Ramos		(substituted on) 29'
FW	14	Claudio Pizarro		(substituted on) 73'
DF	19	Yoshimar Yotún		(substituted on) 74'
Manager:
(Argentina) Ricardo Gareca

=== Third-place play-off ===
3 July 2015	Peru	2–0	Paraguay	Estadio Municipal de Concepción, Concepción
20:30	Carrillo 47'; Guerrero 88'	Report		Attendance: 29,143; Referee: Raúl Orosco (Bolivia)

Peru	Paraguay

GK	1	Pedro Gallese
RB	17	Luis Advíncula
CB	15	Christian Ramos
CB	22	Carlos Ascues
LB	6	Juan Manuel Vargas
RM	18	André Carrillo		(substituted off) 90+1'
CM	21	Josepmir Ballón
CM	16	Carlos Lobatón (c)		(substituted off) 58'
LM	8	Christian Cueva
CF	11	Yordy Reyna		(substituted off) 84'
CF	9	Paolo Guerrero
Substitutions:
DF	19	Yoshimar Yotún	(yellow card) 85'	(substituted on) 58'
MF	20	Joel Sánchez	(yellow card) 88'	(substituted on) 84'
MF	7	Paolo Hurtado		(substituted on) 90+1'
Manager:
(Argentina) Ricardo Gareca

GK	1	Justo Villar (c)
RB	3	Marcos Cáceres		(substituted off) 59'
CB	14	Paulo da Silva
CB	4	Pablo Aguilar
LB	6	Miguel Samudio	(yellow card) 38'
RM	17	Osvaldo Martínez		(substituted off) 57'
CM	15	Víctor Cáceres
CM	20	Néstor Ortigoza		(substituted off) 64'
LM	21	Óscar Romero
CF	7	Raúl Bobadilla
CF	8	Lucas Barrios
Substitutions:
FW	11	Édgar Benítez		(substituted on) 57'
MF	22	Eduardo Aranda		(substituted on) 59'
MF	13	Richard Ortiz		(substituted on) 64'
Manager:
(Argentina) Ramón Díaz

== USA 2016 ==
In the draw held on February 21, 2016, in New York, the Peruvian team was in Group B along with Haiti, Brazil and Ecuador. The team's debut in the competition took place on June 4, 2016, defeating Haiti 1:0. Four days later they drew 2:2 against Ecuador. Peru closed its participation in the first phase with a 1:0 victory against Brazil. The Peruvian team added seven points which allowed him to occupy the first place in his group and advance to the next phase.

In the quarterfinals, they faced the Colombian team with which they tied 0:0 in regulation time, they were finally defeated 4:2 in the penalty shootout. With this result, Peru ranked fifth. The team's top scorers were Raúl Ruidíaz, Edison Flores, Christian Cueva and Paolo Guerrero with one goal each.

=== Squad ===
Head coach: (Argentina) Ricardo Gareca

No.	Pos.	Player	Date of birth (age)	Caps	Goals	Club
1	GK	Pedro Gallese	23 February 1990 (aged 26)	19	0	(Peruvian Football Federation) Juan Aurich
2	DF	Alberto Rodríguez	31 March 1984 (aged 32)	52	0	(Peruvian Football Federation) Sporting Cristal
3	DF	Aldo Corzo	20 May 1989 (aged 27)	8	0	(Peruvian Football Federation) Deportivo Municipal
4	DF	Renzo Revoredo	11 May 1986 (aged 30)	18	0	(Peruvian Football Federation) Sporting Cristal
5	MF	Adán Balbín	13 October 1986 (aged 29)	12	0	(Peruvian Football Federation) Universitario
6	DF	Miguel Trauco	25 August 1992 (aged 23)	2	0	(Peruvian Football Federation) Universitario
7	MF	Beto da Silva	28 December 1996 (aged 19)	0	0	(Royal Dutch Football Association) Jong PSV
8	MF	Andy Polo	29 September 1994 (aged 21)	1	0	(Peruvian Football Federation) Universitario
9	FW	Paolo Guerrero (captain)	1 January 1984 (aged 32)	67	26	(Brazilian Football Confederation) Flamengo
10	FW	Christian Cueva	23 November 1991 (aged 24)	21	1	(Mexican Football Federation) Toluca
11	FW	Raúl Ruidíaz	25 July 1990 (aged 25)	13	1	(Peruvian Football Federation) Universitario
12	GK	Diego Penny	22 April 1984 (aged 32)	15	0	(Peruvian Football Federation) Sporting Cristal
13	MF	Renato Tapia	28 July 1995 (aged 20)	8	0	(Royal Dutch Football Association) Feyenoord
14	MF	Armando Alfageme	3 November 1990 (aged 25)	0	0	(Peruvian Football Federation) Deportivo Municipal
15	DF	Christian Ramos	4 November 1988 (aged 27)	43	1	(Peruvian Football Federation) Juan Aurich
16	MF	Óscar Vílchez	21 January 1986 (aged 30)	1	0	(Peruvian Football Federation) Alianza Lima
17	DF	Luis Abram	27 February 1996 (aged 20)	0	0	(Peruvian Football Federation) Sporting Cristal
18	MF	Cristian Benavente	19 May 1994 (aged 22)	9	1	(Royal Belgian Football Association) Charleroi
19	MF	Yoshimar Yotún	7 April 1990 (aged 26)	52	1	(Swedish Football Association) Malmö FF
20	FW	Edison Flores	15 May 1994 (aged 22)	4	0	(Peruvian Football Federation) Universitario
21	MF	Alejandro Hohberg	20 September 1991 (aged 24)	0	0	(Peruvian Football Federation) Universidad César Vallejo
22	DF	Jair Céspedes	22 May 1984 (aged 32)	7	0	(Peruvian Football Federation) Sporting Cristal
23	GK	Carlos Cáceda	27 September 1991 (aged 24)	0	0	(Peruvian Football Federation) Universitario

=== Group stage ===
==== Group B ====
Pos	Team	Pld	W	D	L	GF	GA	GD	Pts	Qualification
1	Peru	3	2	1	0	4	2	+2	7	Advance to knockout stage
2	Ecuador	3	1	2	0	6	2	+4	5	Advance to knockout stage
3	Brazil	3	1	1	1	7	2	+5	4	
4	Haiti	3	0	0	3	1	12	−11	0	

Source: CONMEBOL & CONCACAF

===== Haiti vs Peru =====
4 June 2016	Haiti	0–1	Peru	CenturyLink Field, Seattle
19:30		Report (CONMEBOL); Report (CONCACAF)	Guerrero 61'	Attendance: 20,190; Referee: John Pitti (Panama)

Haiti	Peru

GK	1	Johny Placide (c)
RB	8	Réginal Goreux
CB	5	Romain Genevois
CB	3	Mechack Jérôme
LB	4	Kim Jaggy
CM	10	Jeff Louis
CM	14	James Marcelin	(yellow card) 75'
CM	13	Kevin Lafrance
RW	19	Max Hilaire		(substituted off) 39'
CF	20	Duckens Nazon		(substituted off) 70'
LW	7	Wilde-Donald Guerrier
Substitutions:
MF	16	Jean Alexandre	(yellow card) 50'	(substituted on) 39'
FW	9	Kervens Belfort		(substituted on) 70'
Manager:
(France) Patrice Neveu

GK	1	Pedro Gallese
RB	4	Renzo Revoredo
CB	2	Alberto Rodríguez	(yellow card) 29'
CB	15	Christian Ramos
LB	6	Miguel Trauco
CM	13	Renato Tapia
CM	16	Óscar Vílchez
RW	21	Alejandro Hohberg		(substituted off) 83'
AM	10	Christian Cueva		(substituted off) 75'
LW	20	Edison Flores		(substituted off) 90+1'
CF	9	Paolo Guerrero (c)	(yellow card) 69'
Substitutions:
MF	19	Yoshimar Yotún	(yellow card) 84'	(substituted on) 75'
MF	8	Andy Polo		(substituted on) 83'
MF	7	Luiz da Silva		(substituted on) 90+1'
Manager:
(Argentina) Ricardo Gareca

===== Ecuador vs Peru =====
8 June 2016	Ecuador	2–2	Peru	University of Phoenix Stadium, Glendale
22:00	E. Valencia 39'; Bolaños 49'	Report (CONMEBOL); Report (CONCACAF)	Cueva 5'; Flores 13'	Attendance: 11,937; Referee: Wilmar Roldán (Colombia)

Ecuador	Peru

GK	22	Alexander Domínguez
RB	4	Juan Carlos Paredes		(substituted off) 46'
CB	21	Gabriel Achilier	(yellow card) 22' (yellow-red card) 90+3'
CB	2	Arturo Mina
LB	10	Walter Ayoví (c)
CM	18	Carlos Gruezo	(yellow card) 12'
CM	6	Christian Noboa
RW	16	Antonio Valencia
AM	23	Miller Bolaños		(substituted off) 62'
LW	7	Jefferson Montero		(substituted off) 88'
CF	13	Enner Valencia
Substitutions:
FW	17	Jaime Ayoví		(substituted on) 46'
MF	9	Fidel Martínez		(substituted on) 62'
FW	19	Juan Cazares		(substituted on) 88'
Manager:
(Bolivia) Gustavo Quinteros

GK	1	Pedro Gallese
RB	4	Renzo Revoredo
CB	15	Christian Ramos
CB	2	Alberto Rodríguez
LB	6	Miguel Trauco
CM	13	Renato Tapia
CM	16	Óscar Vílchez	(yellow card) 52'	(substituted off) 72'
RW	21	Alejandro Hohberg		(substituted off) 50'
AM	10	Christian Cueva
LW	20	Edison Flores		(substituted off) 79'
CF	9	Paolo Guerrero (c)
Substitutions:
MF	8	Andy Polo		(substituted on) 50'
FW	11	Raúl Ruidíaz		(substituted on) 72'
MF	19	Yoshimar Yotún		(substituted on) 79'
Manager:
(Argentina) Ricardo Gareca

===== Brazil vs Peru =====
12 June 2016	Brazil	0–1	Peru	Gillette Stadium, Foxborough
20:30		Report (CONMEBOL); Report (CONCACAF)	Ruidíaz 75'	Attendance: 36,187; Referee: Andrés Cunha (Uruguay)

Brazil	Peru

GK	1	Alisson
RB	2	Dani Alves
CB	3	Miranda (c)
CB	4	Gil
LB	6	Filipe Luís
CM	8	Elias
CM	18	Renato Augusto	(yellow card) 89'
RW	19	Willian
AM	10	Lucas Lima	(yellow card) 72'
LW	22	Philippe Coutinho
CF	11	Gabriel Barbosa		(substituted off) 72'
Substitutions:
FW	21	Hulk		(substituted on) 72'
Manager:
Dunga

GK	1	Pedro Gallese
RB	3	Aldo Corzo
CB	2	Alberto Rodríguez
CB	15	Christian Ramos
LB	6	Miguel Trauco
CM	16	Óscar Vílchez
CM	5	Adán Balbín		(substituted off) 46'
RW	8	Andy Polo
AM	10	Christian Cueva		(substituted off) 90+1'
LW	20	Edison Flores		(substituted off) 64'
CF	9	Paolo Guerrero (c)
Substitutions:
MF	19	Yoshimar Yotún	(yellow card) 90+3'	(substituted on) 46'
FW	11	Raúl Ruidíaz		(substituted on) 64'
MF	13	Renato Tapia		(substituted on) 90+1'
Manager:
(Argentina) Ricardo Gareca

=== Quarter-finals ===
17 June 2016	Peru	0–0 (2–4 p)	Colombia	MetLife Stadium, East Rutherford
20:00		Report (CONMEBOL); Report (CONCACAF)		Attendance: 79,194; Referee: Patricio Loustau (Argentina)
	Penalties
	Ruidíaz (penalty scored); Tapia (penalty scored); Trauco (penalty missed); Cueva (penalty missed)		(penalty scored) Rodríguez; (penalty scored) Cuadrado; (penalty scored) D. Moreno; (penalty scored) Pérez

Peru	Colombia

GK	1	Pedro Gallese
RB	3	Aldo Corzo
CB	2	Alberto Rodríguez
CB	15	Christian Ramos
LB	6	Miguel Trauco
CM	16	Óscar Vílchez
CM	13	Renato Tapia	(yellow card) 63'
RW	8	Andy Polo		(substituted off) 81'
AM	10	Christian Cueva
LW	20	Edison Flores		(substituted off) 77'
CF	9	Paolo Guerrero (c)
Substitutions:
FW	11	Raúl Ruidíaz		(substituted on) 77'
MF	18	Cristian Benavente		(substituted on) 81'
Manager:
(Argentina) Ricardo Gareca

GK	1	David Ospina
RB	4	Santiago Arias
CB	2	Cristián Zapata	(yellow card) 66'
CB	22	Jeison Murillo
LB	19	Farid Díaz	(yellow card) 70'	(substituted off) 90+1'
CM	6	Carlos Sánchez
CM	16	Daniel Torres		(substituted off) 80'
RW	11	Juan Guillermo Cuadrado
AM	10	James Rodríguez (c)
LW	8	Edwin Cardona		(substituted off) 76'
CF	7	Carlos Bacca
Substitutions:
FW	17	Dayro Moreno		(substituted on) 76'
MF	13	Sebastián Pérez		(substituted on) 80'
DF	18	Frank Fabra		(substituted on) 90+1'
Manager:
(Argentina) José Pékerman

== See also ==
- Football in Peru
- History of the Peru national football team
- Peru at the CONCACAF Gold Cup
- Peru at the FIFA World Cup
- Peruvian Football Federation
- Peru national football team results (1927–1979)
- Peru national football team results (1980–1999)
- Peru national football team results (2000–2019)
- Peru national football team results (2020–present)
