= Peru at the CONCACAF Gold Cup =

This is a record of the Peru national football team's results at the CONCACAF Gold Cup. Peru was invited for the 2000 edition of the North American tournament, its first and (as of 2023) only appearance. Despite having been invited only once, Peru is ranked 20th in the all-time table of the CONCACAF Gold Cup tournament.

== History ==
Peru was invited to join the CONCACAF Gold Cup tournament along with Colombia and South Korea. Positioned in Group B of the tournament, Peru started out with a 1–1 tie with Haiti, and a 1–0 loss to the United States. This was enough for Peru to advance and face Honduras, which had ended first in their group. Peru won this quarter-finals match with a 5–3 result. In the semi-finals, Peruvian defenders made a series of mistakes, including an own goal, and the only goal of Peru against Colombia came from Roberto Palacios; Colombia defeated Peru 2–1. Peru placed fourth in the North American competition based on cumulative result.

== Matches ==
Year	Round	Opponent	Result	Peru scorers
(United States) 2000	Group stage	Haiti	1–1	Y. Zúñiga
(United States) 2000	Group stage	United States	0–1	
(United States) 2000	Quarter-finals	Honduras	5–3	R. Holsen, Jorge Soto, J. del Solar, R. Palacios, W. Sáenz
(United States) 2000	Semi-finals	Colombia	1–2	R. Palacios

== Record players ==
Nine players were fielded in all four Gold Cup matches for Peru.

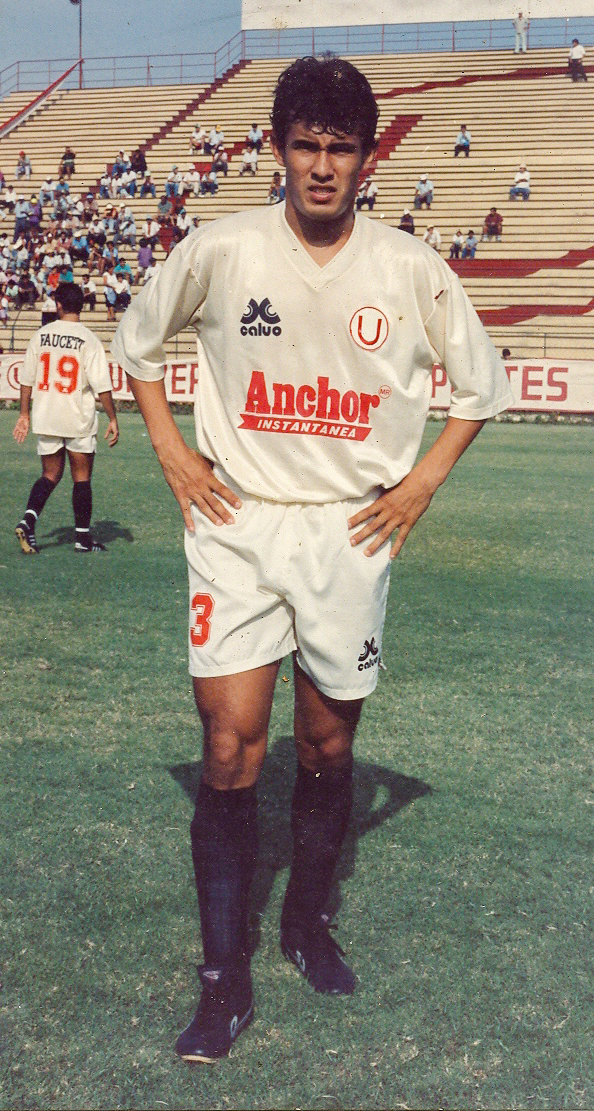
Defender Juan Reynoso played through Peru's only CONCACAF tournament in 2000.

Rank	Player	Matches
1	José del Solar	4
1	Roberto Holsen	4
1	Óscar Ibáñez	4
1	Abel Lobatón	4
1	Roberto Palacios	4
1	Miguel Rebosio	4
1	Juan Reynoso	4
1	Marcial Salazar	4
1	Jorge Soto	4

== Top goalscorers ==
Over the course of four matches, Roberto Palacios was the only Peruvian to score more than once in the 2000 Gold Cup. At the time, he played for Mexican side Tecos UAG.

Rank	Player	Goals
1	Roberto Palacios	2
2	José del Solar	1
2	Roberto Holsen	1
2	Waldir Sáenz	1
2	Jorge Soto	1
2	Ysrael Zúñiga	1

== See also ==
- Peru at the Copa América
- Peru at the FIFA World Cup
