= Santiago Ojeda =

Santiago Ojeda can refer to:

- Santiago Ojeda (footballer)
- Santiago Ojeda (judoka)
