= Adán Balbín =

Peruvian footballer (born 1986)

Personal information
- Full name: Adán Adolfo Balbín Silva
- Date of birth: 13 October 1986 (age 40)
- Place of birth: Huaral, Peru
- Height: 1.80 m (5 ft 11 in)
- Position: Centre back

Senior career*
Years	Team	Apps	(Gls)
2005–2007	Unión Huaral	51	(3)
2007–2008	Coronel Bolognesi	72	(3)
2009–2013	Universidad San Martín	74	(4)
2014–2015	Sporting Cristal	16	(0)
2015	Unión Comercio	14	(0)
2016–2018	Universitario	56	(4)
2019	Real Garcilaso	2	(0)
2019–2021	Sport Boys	29	(3)
2021	Alianza Atlético	19	(0)
2022	Alfonso Ugarte	9	(1)
2022	Comerciantes Unidos	12	(1)
2023	Juan Aurich	5	(2)

International career^{‡}
2010–2016	Peru	15	(0)
Medal record
Representing Peru
Association football
Copa América
Bronze medal – third place	Argentina 2011
- * Club domestic league appearances and goals as of 21:51, 8 August 2024 (UTC) ‡ National team caps and goals as of 25 May 2016

Adán Adolfo Balbín Silva (born 13 October 1986) is a Peruvian former professional footballer who played as a defensive midfielder or centre back. He made 15 appearances for the Peru national team.

== Club career ==
Balbín started his professional career with his hometown club Unión Huaral in 2005. Then in 2007 he joined first division club Coronel Bolognesi. There the manager of Bolognesi at the time, Juan Reynoso, decided to use him as a centre back. With Bolognesi he won his first professional title, which was the 2007 Torneo Clausura. Adan played in Tacna until the end of the 2008 season. In January 2009 Balbín joined Universidad San Martín. In December 2013, he moved to play for Sporting Cristal.

== International career ==
Balbín's impressive performances for his club convinced the new national team coach Sergio Markarian to give him his chance to play for the national team. On 17 November 2010, he made his national team debut in friendly against Colombia by substituting Josepmir Ballón late in the match. The friendly was played in Bogotá and finished in a 1–1 draw.

== Honours ==
Coronel Bolognesi

- Apertura: 2007

Universidad San Martín

- Torneo Descentralizado: 2010

Peru

- Copa América bronze medal: 2011
