= Aldo Corzo =

Peruvian footballer (born 1989)

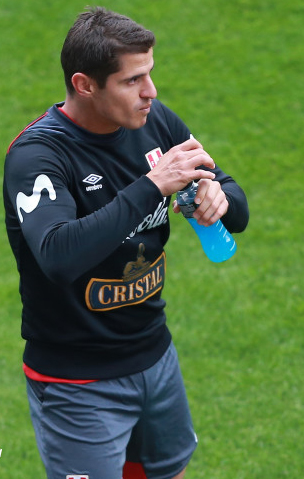
- Corzo training with Peru at the 2018 FIFA World Cup

Personal information
- Full name: Aldo Sebastián Corzo Chávez
- Date of birth: 20 May 1989 (age 37)
- Place of birth: Lima, Peru
- Height: 1.72 m (5 ft 8 in)
- Position: Full-back

Team information
- Current team: Universitario
- Number: 29

Youth career
- 1999–2007: Regatas Lima

Senior career*
Years	Team	Apps	(Gls)
2008–2009	Alianza Lima	47	(1)
2010–2015	USMP	157	(5)
2016	Deportivo Municipal	35	(5)
2017–	Universitario	253	(18)

International career^{‡}
2008	Peru U20	4	(0)
2009–2025	Peru	53	(0)
Medal record
Men's football
Representing Peru
Copa América
Runner-up	2019 Brazil
Third place	2011 Argentina
Third place	2015 Chile
- * Club domestic league appearances and goals as of 17 August 2025 ‡ National team caps and goals as of 23:23, 18 November 2024 (UTC)

Aldo Sebastián Corzo Chávez (born 20 May 1989) is a Peruvian professional footballer who plays as right-back for Peruvian Liga 1 club Universitario de Deportes and the Peru national team.

== Early life ==
Corzo was born on 20 May 1989 in Lima to Jorge Corzo and María Roxana Chávez, an economist.

== Club career ==
=== Alianza Lima ===
Corzo arrived to Alianza Lima after playing in the youth ranks of Club de Regatas Lima when Jaime Duarte, a former Alianza player, saw him. He was promoted to the first team in 2008 by Richard Páez. In August 2008, he made his official debut in a 2–0 victory against Sport Boys in Matute, playing the entire game and doing an outstanding performance. After that match, Corzo became a regular in the starting XI, later a key player, and contributed to saving Alianza from relegation to the second division. The following year, he played the 2009 Torneo Descentralizado finals, ultimately losing against Universitario de Deportes.

=== Universidad San Martin ===
On 7 January 2010, Corzo signed a two years contract for Universidad San Martín de Porres, with which he won the 2010 Torneo Descentralizado, as well as playing the 2010 Copa Sudamericana, the 2011 Copa Libertadores and the 2012 Copa Sudamericana. Corzo played a total of 153 matches for the club and scored 5 goals.

=== Deportivo Municipal ===
After five seasons with San Martín, he moved to Deportivo Municipal for the 2016 season, consolidating himself as the starting right-back, with the team reaching the playoff semi-finals, finishing in fourth place, with Corzo scoring 6 goals and being nominated to the best player award.

=== Universitario de Deportes ===
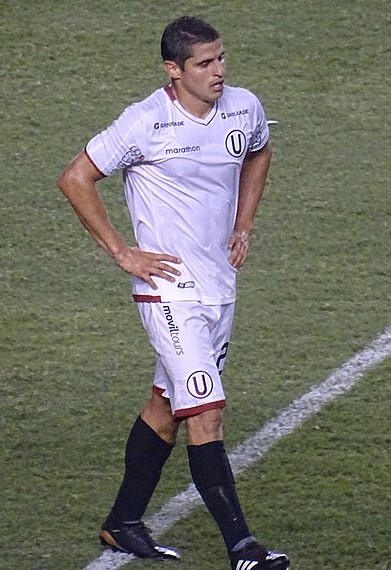
Corzo playing for Universitario in 2018

In December 2016, Corzo was signed by Universitario de Deportes with a contract for two seasons, in which he played in the qualifying stages of the 2017 and 2018 Copa Libertadores. At the end of 2018, after two years of being a regular starter, his contract was renewed for a further three seasons.

== International career ==
Corzo was part of the Peru U-20 team in the 2009 South American Youth Championship, being eliminated quickly by losing four games. On 2 February 2009, he was called to the senior team by the then current coach Jose 'Chemo' del Solar to play a friendly against El Salvador losing 1–0.

In June 2011, the new Peru national team coach Sergio Markarián decided to give Corzo a chance to play in a friendly against Senegal. The friendly took place on 28 June 2011 in Lima, and it was the last friendly before the start of the Copa América. He played the entire match against Senegal which finished in a 1–0 victory in favor of Peru.

=== 2011 Copa America ===
Corzo's consistent performances convinced Markarian to include him in Peru's squad for the 2011 Copa América. He made his Copa America debut by starting against Chile in the group stage. Despite the loss, he put in a strong performance at left back by not allowing Chile, with Alexis Sánchez, to score. Corzo's second game in the Copa America was against Venezuela in the third-place match. He again played from the start of the match and gave another solid performance this time at right back. In the end, he helped Peru claim the bronze medal by winning the match 4–1. This was Peru's best result in the Copa America since they last won Gold in 1975.

=== 2016 Copa América ===
Corzo's performances with Municipal made manager Ricardo Gareca call him up for Peru's squad for the Copa América Centenario, where he played in 2 out of 4 matches.

=== 2018 World Cup ===
In May 2018, he was named in Peru's provisional 24 man squad for the 2018 World Cup in Russia.

== Playing style ==
Corzo mainly plays at right back and is naturally right-footed, but he can also play at left back. He is known for his great stamina, his strong willingness to help in the attack, and his aggressive style of defending. He also has good speed and control of the ball.

== Personal life ==
Corzo studies Administration in Business at Universidad San Ignacio de Loyola.

== Career statistics ==
As of match played on 18 November 2024

Appearances and goals by national team and year
National team	Year	Apps	Goals
Peru	2009	3	0
Peru	2010	0	0
Peru	2011	4	0
Peru	2012	1	0
Peru	2013	0	0
Peru	2014	0	0
Peru	2015	0	0
Peru	2016	8	0
Peru	2017	6	0
Peru	2018	4	0
Peru	2019	5	0
Peru	2020	1	0
Peru	2021	8	0
Peru	2022	4	0
Peru	2023	5	0
Peru	2024	3	0
Total		53	0

== Honours ==
Universidad San Martín

- Torneo Descentralizado: 2010

Universitario de Deportes

- Liga 1: 2023, 2024, 2025

Peru

- Copa América: bronze medal 2011; silver medal 2019

Individual

- Torneo Descentralizado Right-back of the Year: 2009
