= Salomón Libman =

Peruvian footballer (born 1984)

Personal information
- Full name: Salomón Alexis Libman Pastor
- Date of birth: 25 February 1984 (age 42)
- Place of birth: Lima, Peru
- Height: 1.85 m (6 ft 1 in)
- Position: Goalkeeper

Youth career
- 1989–1997: Academia Cantolao
- 1998–2002: Sport Boys

Senior career*
Years	Team	Apps	(Gls)
2003–2008	Sport Boys	68	(0)
2008–2012	Alianza Lima	106	(0)
2013–2016	UCV	172	(0)
2017–2018	Sport Rosario	64	(1)
2018	Melgar	1	(0)
2019	Sport Huancayo	9	(0)
2020–2022	UTC	86	(0)
2023	Unión Comercio	6	(0)
Total		512	(1)

International career
2010–2016	Peru	6	(0)
Medal record
Representing Peru
Association football
Copa America
Bronze medal – third place	Argentina 2011
Bronze medal – third place	Chile 2015
- * Club domestic league appearances and goals

Salomón Libman (born 25 February 1984) is a Peruvian former professional footballer who played as a goalkeeper.

== Early life ==
Libman was born in Lima, Peru. He is 1.84 m tall, and weighs 80 kg.

Before joining Alianza Lima he played for Sport Boys.

Libman retired in November 2023 and became goalkeeping coach of Alianza Lima's reserves and its U18 team.

== Honours ==
Peru

- Copa America bronze medal: 2011, 2015

Individual

- Descentralizado Goalkeeper of the Year: 2010
