= Michael Guevara =

Peruvian footballer (born 1984)

Personal information
- Full name: Michael Fidel Guevara Legua
- Date of birth: 10 June 1984 (age 42)
- Place of birth: Lima, Peru
- Height: 1.73 m (5 ft 8 in)
- Positions: Attacking midfielder; centre midfielder

Youth career
- Universitario

Senior career*
| Years | Team | Apps | (Gls) |
| 2002–2005 | Universitario | 61 | (7) |
| 2005–2006 | Unión Huaral | 9 | (1) |
| 2006–2007 | Sport Boys | 38 | (5) |
| 2007 | Universitario | 13 | (0) |
| 2008 | Juan Aurich | 21 | (0) |
| 2008 | Univ. César Vallejo | 17 | (2) |
| 2009 | Jagiellonia Białystok | 3 | (0) |
| 2009 | CNI | 19 | (6) |
| 2010–2011 | Sport Boys | 62 | (11) |
| 2012 | Univ. San Martín | 0 | (0) |
| 2012–2013 | Juan Aurich | 50 | (6) |
| 2013 | Once Caldas | 15 | (0) |
| 2014 | UTC | 6 | (0) |
| 2014–2015 | Unión Comercio | 10 | (0) |
| 2015 | Los Caimanes | 17 | (5) |
| 2016 | Unión Huaral | 8 | (3) |
| 2018 | Unión Huaral | 18 | (3) |

International career
| 2011–2013 | Peru | 13 | (0) |
Medal record
Representing Peru
Association football
Copa America
| Bronze medal – third place | Argentina 2011 |
- * Club domestic league appearances and goals

Michael Fidel Guevara Legua (born 10 June 1984) is a Peruvian former professional footballer who played as an attacking midfielder. He played for the Peru national team led by Sergio Markarián, and helped his team finish third in the 2011 Copa America in Argentina.

== Playing career ==
=== Club career ===
Guevara developed as footballer in the youth academy of Peruvian giants Universitario de Deportes. He was promoted to their first team in July 2002.

=== International career ===
Guevara made his senior debut for the Peru national team on 8 February 2011, in a friendly against Panama. Debuting in Moquegua, manager Sergio Markarián put him in the starting eleven and later replaced him in the 46th minute for Carlos Lobatón as the match finished 1–0 for Peru.

== Honours ==
Peru U18

- Bolivarian Games: 2001
