= Ottorino Sartor =

Peruvian footballer (1945–2021)

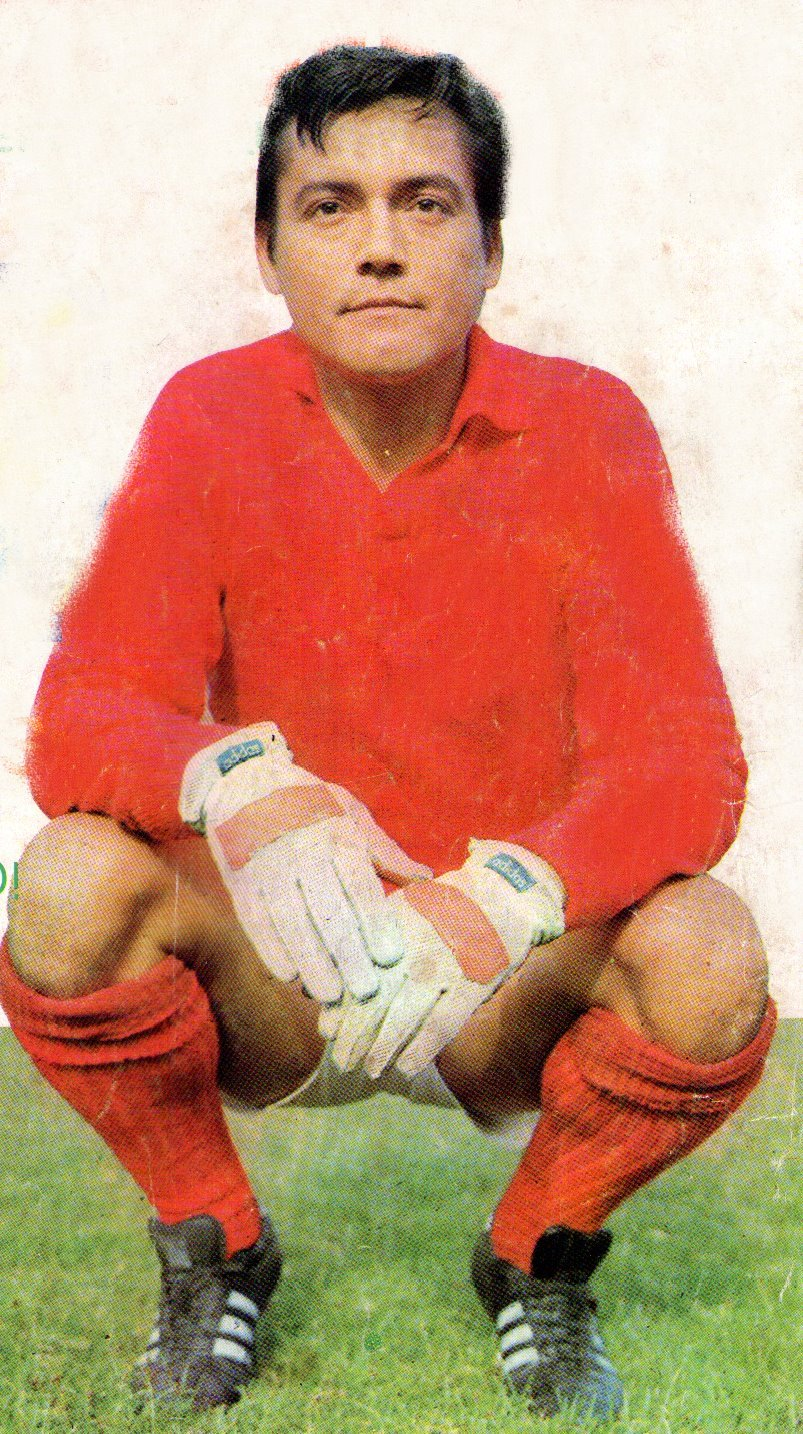
- Sartor playing for Atlético Chalaco

Personal information
- Date of birth: 18 September 1945
- Place of birth: Chancay, Department of Lima, Peru
- Date of death: 2 June 2021 (aged 75)
- Height: 1.81 m (5 ft 11 in)
- Position: Goalkeeper

Senior career*
Years	Team	Apps	(Gls)
1965–1971	Defensor Arica		
1972	José Gálvez		
1973–1974	Atlético Chalaco		
1975	Universitario		
1976–1978	CNI		
1979	Coronel Bolognesi		
1980	Tarma	27	(0)
1981	Sport Boys		
1982	Juventud La Joya		

International career
1966–1979	Peru	27	(0)
- * Club domestic league appearances and goals

Ottorino Sartor (18 September 1945 – 2 June 2021) was a Peruvian professional footballer who played as a goalkeeper.

== Club career ==
Sartor played for Defensor Arica, a Lima-based team and Atlético Miguel. He played his club football for Colegio Nacional de Iquitos.

== International career ==
Sartor competed for the Peru national football team at the 1978 FIFA World Cup, and obtained a total number of 27 caps for his native country in the years 1966 to 1979.

He was the starting goalkeeper in Peru’s 1975 Copa America championship team.

== Death ==
Sartor died on 2 June 2021 aged 75.

== See also ==
- 1978 FIFA World Cup squads
