= Jair Céspedes =

Peruvian footballer (born 1984)

Personal information
- Full name: Jair Edson Céspedes Zegarra
- Date of birth: 22 May 1984 (age 42)
- Place of birth: Mollendo, Peru
- Height: 1.70 m (5 ft 7 in)
- Positions: Left-back; left winger

Team information
- Current team: Deportivo Municipal

Youth career
- 1993–1998: Deportivo Municipal
- 1998–2002: Alianza Lima

Senior career*
Years	Team	Apps	(Gls)
2003	Alianza Lima	1	(0)
2004	→ Deportivo Municipal (loan)	?	(4)
2005	→ Deportivo Aviación (loan)	?	(3)
2006–2007	Sport Boys	70	(2)
2008	Universidad San Martín	12	(0)
2008–2009	Ironi Kiryat Shmona	15	(0)
2008–2009	Hapoel Petah Tikva	14	(0)
2009	Maccabi Akhi Nazareth	1	(0)
2009	Bnei Sakhnin	4	(0)
2010	Universidad César Vallejo	21	(0)
2011	León de Huánuco	25	(2)
2012	Universidad San Martín	36	(3)
2013–2015	Juan Aurich	88	(2)
2016–2019	Sporting Cristal	135	(0)
2020–2021	Cusco	44	(1)
2022	Deportivo Binacional	31	(1)
2023–2024	Deportivo Municipal	22	(1)
2026–	Deportivo Municipal	1	(0)

International career
2007–2016	Peru	9	(0)
Medal record
Representing Peru
Association football
Copa America
Bronze medal – third place	Chile 2015
- * Club domestic league appearances and goals as of 30 October 2022

Jair Edson Céspedes Zegarra (born 22 March 1984) is a Peruvian professional footballer who plays as a left-back or left winger for Deportivo Municipal.

== International career ==
Céspedes made his debut for the Peru national team on 24 March 2007 in a friendly against Japan. He was called up by Julio César Uribe to play in the 2007 Copa América. However, he did not appear on the pitch.
