= Josepmir Ballón =

Peruvian footballer (born 1988)

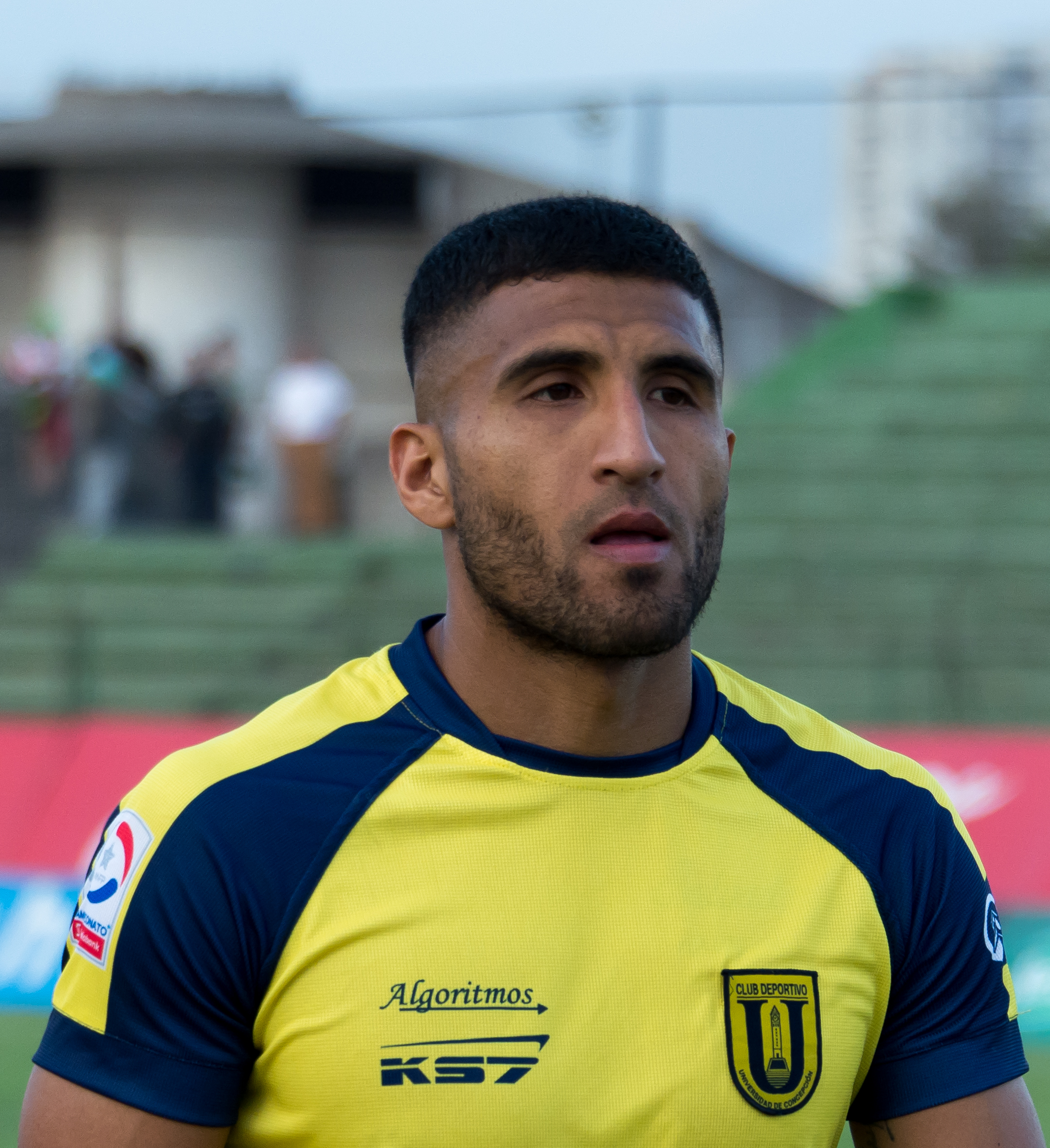
- Ballón with Universidad de Concepción in 2019

Personal information
- Full name: Josepmir Aarón Ballón Villacorta
- Date of birth: 21 March 1988 (age 38)
- Place of birth: Lima, Peru
- Height: 1.78 m (5 ft 10 in)
- Position: Defensive midfielder

Team information
- Current team: Unión Huaral

Youth career
- 2005–2006: Academia Cantolao

Senior career*
| Years | Team | Apps | (Gls) |
| 2007–2014 | U. de San Martín de Porres | 186 | (9) |
| 2010–2011 | → River Plate (loan) | 12 | (0) |
| 2014–2019 | Sporting Cristal | 159 | (12) |
| 2019 | Universidad de Concepción | 18 | (1) |
| 2020–2024 | Alianza Lima | 123 | (4) |
| 2024–2025 | UCV | 25 | (1) |
| 2025–2026 | Deportivo Coopsol | 22 | (0) |
| 2026– | Unión Huaral | 0 | (0) |

International career^{‡}
| 2005 | Peru U17 | 3 | (0) |
| 2009– | Peru | 54 | (0) |
Medal record
Men's football
Representing Peru
Copa América
| Runner-up | 2019 Brazil |
| Third place | 2011 Argentina |
| Third place | 2015 Chile |
- * Club domestic league appearances and goals as of 17:35, 8 March 2026 (UTC) ‡ National team caps and goals as of 22 October 2020

Josepmir Aarón Ballón Villacorta (born 21 March 1988) is a Peruvian professional footballer who plays as a defensive midfielder for Peruvian Tercera División club Unión Huaral and the Peru national team.

== Club career ==
Ballón began his career with Academia Deportiva Cantolao and in January 2007 joined Universidad San Martín where he made his debut in the Torneo Descentralizado. On 26 June 2010 the midfielder left Universidad San Martín and was loaned out to River Plate.

In January 2015, Ballón joined Sporting Cristal. On 7 February, he scored in his debut for the Torneo Descentralizado against Deportivo Municipal; it was the 2-0.

== International career ==
Ballón played for the Peru national under-17 football team the 2005 FIFA U-17 World Championship in Peru. He has earned 29 caps while a member of the Peru national team.

== Personal life ==
Ballón is married and has two children.

== Honours ==
Universidad San Martín

- Peruvian Primera División: 2007, 2008, 2010

Sporting Cristal

- Peruvian Primera División: 2014, 2016

Alianza Lima

- Peruvian Primera División: 2021, 2022

Peru

- Copa America: runner up 2019; bronze medal 2011, 2015
