= Waldir Sáenz =

Peruvian footballer (born 1973)

Personal information
- Full name: Waldir Alejandro Sáenz Pérez
- Date of birth: May 15, 1973 (age 53)
- Place of birth: Lima, Perú
- Height: 1.73 m (5 ft 8 in)
- Position: Striker

Youth career
- 1986–1991: Alianza Lima

Senior career*
Years	Team	Apps	(Gls)
1992–1998	Alianza Lima	169	(108)
1998	Colorado Rapids	23	(6)
1999	Alianza Lima	32	(22)
1999–2000	Unión de Santa Fe	3	(1)
2000	Sporting Cristal	15	(4)
2001–2005	Alianza Lima	117	(38)
2006	Melgar	6	(1)
2007	Deportivo Municipal	5	(0)
2008	Alianza Lima	6	(0)
2009	Sport Boys	18	(12)
2013	Walter Ormeño	8	(2)

International career^{‡}
1993–2000	Peru	27	(3)
- * Club domestic league appearances and goals as of January 2010 ‡ National team caps and goals as of January 2010

Waldir Alejandro Sáenz Pérez (born May 15, 1973, in Lima) is a Peruvian retired football striker.

== Career ==
Waldir is most famous as a player for Alianza Lima, in which he became the all-time leading goalscorer of the club with 168 goals in 324 matches. He also played for Colorado Rapids (1998), Unión de Santa Fe (1999), Sporting Cristal (2000), among others. In 2013, he came back from retirement to play for Walter Ormeño.

== International career ==
He obtained 27 caps for the Peru national football team from 1993 to 2000, scoring three goals.

== Career statistics ==
=== International ===
Appearances and goals by national team and year
National team	Year	Apps	Goals
Peru	1993	5	1
Peru	1994	3	1
Peru	1996	3	0
Peru	1997	11	0
Peru	1998	1	0
Peru	1999	1	0
Peru	2000	3	1
Total		27	3

Scores and results list Peru's goal tally first, score column indicates score after each Sáenz goal.

List of international goals scored by Waldir Sáenz
No.	Date	Venue	Opponent	Score	Result	Competition	Ref.
1	13 July 1993	National Stadium of Peru, Lima, Peru	Uruguay	1–2	1–2	Friendly	
2	17 August 1994	Lima, Peru	Ecuador	2–0	2–0	Friendly	
3	19 February 2000	Miami Orange Bowl, Miami, United States	Honduras	5–3	5–3	2000 CONCACAF Gold Cup	
