= Santiago Ojeda (footballer) =

Peruvian footballer (born 1951)

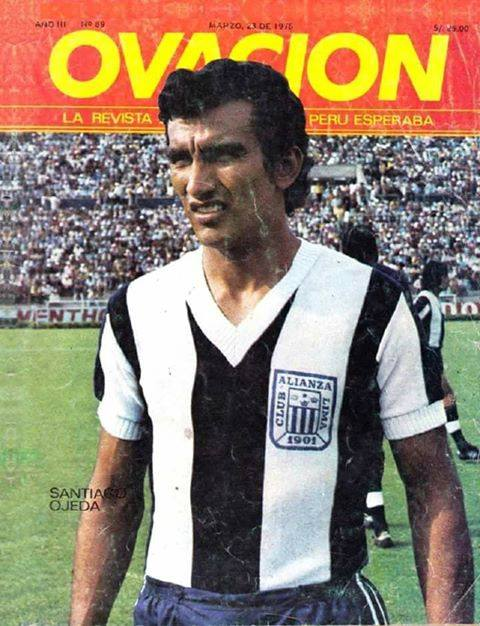
- Ojeda in 1976

Personal information
- Date of birth: 26 April 1951 (age 75)
- Place of birth: Catacaos, Piura, Peru
- Position: Midfielder

Senior career*
Years	Team	Apps	(Gls)
1969-1970	Atlético Grau		
1971-1972	Sport Boys		
1973-1975	Atlético Chalaco		
1976-1977	Alianza Lima		
1978	Portuguesa F.C.		
1978-1979	Panionios		
1979-1981	Deportivo Municipal		
1984-1985	Octavio Espinosa		
1986	Juventud La Joya		

International career
1975	Peru	5	(0)
- * Club domestic league appearances and goals

Santiago Alberto Ojeda Correa (born 26 April 1951) is a Peruvian footballer. He played in five matches for the Peru national football team in 1975. He was also part of Peru's squad for the 1975 Copa América tournament.
