= José del Solar =

Peruvian footballer and manager (born 1967)

Personal information
- Full name: José Guillermo del Solar Alvarez-Calderón
- Date of birth: 28 November 1967 (age 58)
- Place of birth: Lima, Peru
- Height: 1.87 m (6 ft 2 in)
- Position: Midfielder

Youth career
- Universitario

Senior career*
Years	Team	Apps	(Gls)
1986–1989	Universitario	56	(4)
1986–1987	→ San Agustín (loan)	61	(6)
1990–1992	Universidad Católica	91	(2)
1992–1995	Tenerife	72	(3)
1995–1996	Salamanca	36	(6)
1996–1997	Celta	29	(1)
1997–1998	Valencia	12	(0)
1998–1999	Beşiktaş	27	(1)
1999–2000	Universitario	35	(8)
2000–2001	Mechelen	17	(1)
2001–2002	Universitario	37	(10)
Total		473	(42)

International career
1986–2001	Peru	74	(9)

Managerial career
- 2003: Villarreal B
- 2004: Villarreal B
- 2005: Colón
- 2005–2006: Sporting Cristal
- 2007: Universidad Católica
- 2007–2009: Peru
- 2010–2011: Universitario
- 2014: Universitario
- 2016: USMP
- 2017: Sporting Cristal
- 2018–2022: UCV
- 2023–2024: Peru Olympic
- 2024–2025: Peru U20
- 2025–2026: UCV
- * Club domestic league appearances and goals

José Guillermo del Solar Alvarez-Calderón (born 28 November 1967) is a Peruvian football manager and former player who played as a defensive midfielder.

During his playing career, spent in four countries – mainly in Spain, where he amassed La Liga totals of 149 matches and ten goals during six seasons – he was nicknamed Chemo. He started and finished it at Universitario.

Del Solar was a Peruvian international for 15 years. He started working as a manager in 2005, also being in charge of the national team late into the decade.

== Playing career ==
=== Club ===
Born in Lima, Del Solar developed at the youth system of Universitario de Deportes, but played his first professional match with Asociación Deportiva San Agustín after he was loaned by Universitario to continue his development as a player. He won his first Peruvian Primera División championship with San Agustín, defeating Alianza Lima in December 1986.

Del Solar's last official appearance was a 0–0 draw against traditional rivals Alianza Lima for the Apertura on 7 July 2002, playing for his first club which won 1–0 in the first game, with 0–0 in Trujillo.

Del Solar competed in Spain from 1992 to 1998, always in La Liga. He started at CD Tenerife – where he partnered Argentine Fernando Redondo in central midfield, and also his compatriot Percy Olivares – helping the Canary Islands side rob Real Madrid of the league title in the last round in his first season, playing in 30 matches and scoring once (the team also qualified for the first time ever to the UEFA Cup); this dramatic league scenario also happened in the following year, but his presence was much more testimonial.

In 1996, after suffering relegation with UD Salamanca, del Solar was a starter at RC Celta de Vigo but appeared rarely for Valencia CF, after which he left the country, resuming his career in Turkey and Belgium (one season apiece, interspersed with spells in his country) and finally retiring at his very first club at the age of 34.

=== International ===
Del Solar earned 74 caps for Peru, in which he scored nine goals. He made his debut on 28 January 1986 against China (1–3), playing his last international match on 8 November 2001 against Argentina (0–2), 20 days before his 34th birthday.

Del Solar was selected to six Copa América tournaments, netting three times in four matches – twice through penalties – as the national team reached the quarter-finals in the 1993 edition, in Ecuador.

List of international goals scored by José del Solar
No.	Date	Venue	Opponent	Score	Result	Competition
#	Date	Venue	Opponent	Score	Result	Competition
1.	20 August 1989	Estadio Hernando Siles, La Paz, Bolivia	Bolivia	0–1	2–1	1990 World Cup qualification
2.	8 July 1991	Estadio Municipal, Concepción, Chile	Chile	3–2	4–2	1991 Copa América
3.	12 July 1991	Estadio Nacional, Santiago, Chile	Venezuela	4–1	5–1	1991 Copa América
4.	21 June 1993	Estadio Alejandro Serrano Aguilar, Cuenca, Ecuador	Paraguay	1–1	1–1	1993 Copa América
5.	24 June 1993	Estadio Alejandro Serrano Aguilar, Cuenca, Ecuador	Chile	1–0	1–0	1993 Copa América
6.	27 June 1993	Estadio Olímpico Atahualpa, Quito, Ecuador	Mexico	1–4	2–4	1993 Copa América
7.	15 August 1993	Estadio Defensores del Chaco, Asunción, Paraguay	Paraguay	2–1	2–1	1994 World Cup qualification
8.	19 February 2000	Orange Bowl, Miami, United States	Honduras	1–3	3–5	2000 CONCACAF Gold Cup
9.	12 July 2001	Estadio Olímpico Pascual Guerrero, Cali, Colombia	Paraguay	3–2	3–3	2001 Copa América

== Coaching career ==
Del Solar began working as a coach with Villarreal CF's reserves in Tercera División, in 2003, but left in December to acquire his coaching license. He returned to the side in June 2004, but resigned on 4 October.

In 2005, del Solar worked at Club Atlético Colón, aided by former Tenerife teammate Juan Antonio Pizzi as the pair was sacked after only three matches and as many losses. He was named manager of Sporting Cristal afterwards, leading the team to the domestic league in 2005.

In 2007, del Solar was appointed at former club Club Deportivo Universidad Católica, finishing second behind Colo-Colo in Apertura 2007. On 3 August of that year, he replaced Julio César Uribe as manager of the national side; he went on to be part of the disastrous 2010 FIFA World Cup qualification campaign, as they only won three times and ranked last.

== Honours ==
=== Player ===
San Agustín

- Peruvian Primera División: 1986

Universitario

- Peruvian Primera División: 1987, 1999, 2000
- Apertura 2002

Universidad Católica

- Copa Chile: 1991

=== Manager ===
Sporting Cristal

- Peruvian Primera División: 2005

Universidad César Vallejo

- Peruvian Segunda División: 2018

== Managerial statistics ==
As of 13 August 2012

Team	Nat	From	To	Record				
Team	Nat	From	To	G	W	D	L	Win %
Sporting Cristal	(Peru)	January 2005	July 2006	87	43	25	19	49.43
Universidad Católica	(Chile)	January 2007	July 2007	20	14	4	2	70
Peru	(Peru)	July 2007	December 2009	23	5	5	13	21.74
Universitario	(Peru)	August 2010	May 2012	53	19	22	12	35.85
Total				183	81	56	46	44.26
