= 2009 Club Universitario de Deportes season =

Universitario de Deportes
2009 season
- Chairman: Gino Pinasco
- Manager: Juan Reynoso
- Descentralizado: Champion
- Top goalscorer: League: Labarthe (12); All: Labarthe (13)
Home colours	Away colours

The 2009 season is Universitario de Deportes' 81st season in the Peruvian Primera División and 44th in the Campeonato Descentralizado. This article shows player statistics and all matches (official and friendly) that the club played during the 2009 season. The season's biggest highlight was the signing of Nolberto Solano.

== Players ==
Summer and winter transfers correspond to Southern Hemisphere seasons.

=== Squad information ===
N	Pos.	Nat.	Name	Age	Since	App	Goals	Ends	Transfer fee	Notes
1	GK	(Peru)	Fernández	40	2007				Youth system	
2	DF	(Peru)	Galliquio	46	2009					
3	DF	(Argentina)	Galván	53	2007				$1.2m	
4	DF	(Peru)	Villamarín	44	2009					
5	MF	(Peru)	Gonzales	40	2006				Youth system	
6	MF	(Peru)	Rainer	46	2008				$ 1m	
7	MF	(Peru)	Miguel Angel	44	2007				Youth system	
8	MF	(Peru)	Quina	39	2008 (Winter)			2009		
9	FW	(Argentina)	Perillo	41	2008 (Winter)			2009	Free	
9	FW	(Peru)	Ruidíaz		2009 (Winter)				Free	
10	MF	(Peru)	Bustamante	43	2009					
11	FW	(Peru)	Labarthe	42	2008				$ 0.6m	
12	GK	(Peru)	Llontop	41	2006				Youth system	
13	DF	(Peru)	Calderón	36	2007				Youth system	
14	MF	(Peru)	Landauri	40	2008				$ 0.5m	
15	MF	(Peru)	Vásquez	42	2008 (Winter)					
16	DF	(Peru)	Revoredo	40	2009					
17	MF	(Peru)	Carmona	41	2008 (Winter)					
18	FW	(Brazil)	Calheira	42	2009					
19	FW	(Peru)	Orejuela	46	2009			2009		
19	MF	(Mexico)	Cerda	39	2009 (Winter)			2009		
20	DF	(Peru)	Novoa	40	2009					
21	MF	(Mexico)	Espinoza	40	2009					
23	FW	(Peru)	Alva	47	2009					
24	MF	(Peru)	Solano	51	2009					
25	GK	(Peru)	Bazán	46	2009					
26	DF	(Peru)	Balta	40	2006				Youth system	
27	DF	(Peru)	Duarte	36	2007				Youth system	
28	MF	(Peru)	Rabanal	41	2006				Free	
29	FW	(Peru)	Conde	35	2009				Youth system	
30	FW	(Peru)	La Torre	36	2009					

- Last updated: 4 November 2008
- Source: Universitario Plantilla
- Ordered by Jersey number.

=== Players in/out ===
==== In ====
No.	Pos.	Nat.	Name	Age	Moving from	Type	Transfer window	Ends	Transfer fee	Source
2	DF	(Peru)	Galliquio	46	Dinamo București (Romania)	Free	Summer			DeChalaca
4	DF	(Peru)	Villamarín	44	Chornomorets Odesa (Ukraine)	Transfer ✓	Summer			DeChalaca
10	MF	(Peru)	Bustamante	43	Alianza Atlético	Transfer ✓	Summer			DeChalaca
16	DF	(Peru)	Revoredo	40	Coronel Bolognesi	Transfer ✓	Summer			DeChalaca
18	FW	(Brazil)	Calheira	42	Sport Áncash	Transfer ✓	Summer			DeChalaca
19	FW	(Peru)	Orejuela	46	Universidad César Vallejo	Transfer ✓	Summer			DeChalaca
20	DF	(Peru)	Novoa	40	Coronel Bolognesi	Transfer ✓	Summer			DeChalaca
21	MF	(Mexico)	Espinoza	40	Chiapas (Mexico)	Transfer ✓	Summer			DeChalaca
23	FW	(Peru)	Alva	47	Cienciano	Transfer ✓	Summer			DeChalaca
24	MF	(Peru)	Solano	51	AEL (Greece)	Transfer ✓	Summer			DeChalaca
25	GK	(Peru)	Bazán	46	Cienciano	Transfer ✓	Summer			DeChalaca
29	FW	(Peru)	Conde	35		Promoted	Summer			DeChalaca
30	FW	(Peru)	La Torre	36	Sport Boys	Transfer ✓	Summer			DeChalaca
	MF	(Peru)	Correa	36	Melgar	Loan return	Summer			DeChalaca
	DF	(Peru)	Nuñez	37	Sport Boys	Transfer ✓	Summer			DeChalaca
	FW	(Mexico)	Cerda	39	UANL (Mexico)	Loan ✓	Winter			Universitario.pe
9	FW	(Peru)	Ruidíaz	36		Promoted	Winter			Universitario.pe

==== Out ====
No.	Pos.	Nat.	Name	Age	Moving to	Type	Transfer window	Transfer fee	Source
2	MF	(Peru)	Molina	40	José Gálvez	Loaned out ✓	Summer		DeChalaca
3	MF	(Peru)	Neyra	42	José Gálvez	Loaned out ✓	Summer		DeChalaca
9	FW	(Peru)	Jiménez	43	San Lorenzo (Argentina)	Loan ended ✓	Summer		DeChalaca
10	MF	(Peru)	Candelo	49	Juan Aurich	Loaned out ✓	Summer		DeChalaca
14	DF	(Peru)	Araujo	46	Total Chalaco	Transfer ✓	Summer		DeChalaca
15	MF	(Peru)	Cevasco	39	Ironi Kiryat Shmona (Israel)	Transfer ✓	Summer		DeChalaca
17		(Peru)	Tragodara	40	Inti Gas	Loaned out ✓	Summer		DeChalaca
18	FW	(Colombia)	Hurtado	51	Sporting Cristal	End of contract	Summer		DeChalaca
25	MF	(Peru)	Ramírez	42	Libertad (Paraguay)	Transfer ✓	Summer		DeChalaca
21	GK	(Peru) (Argentina)	Ibáñez	59		Retired	Summer		DeChalaca
29	MF	(Peru)	Bernales	50	Total Chalaco	Loaned out ✓	Summer		DeChalaca
—	FW	(Peru)	Ávila	36	Sport Huancayo	Loaned out ✓	Summer		DeChalaca
—	FW	(Peru)	R. Ardiles		Melgar	Loaned out ✓	Summer		DeChalaca
—	MF	(Peru)	J. Fajardo		Melgar	Loaned out ✓	Summer		DeChalaca
—	DF	(Peru)	Nuñez	37	Sport Boys	Loaned out ✓	Summer		
—	MF	(Peru)	P. Orozco		Coronel Bolognesi	Loaned out ✓	Summer		
27	MF	(Peru)	Correa	36	Melgar	Loaned out ✓	Summer		
8	MF	(Peru)	Quina	39	Westerlo (Belgium)	Loaned out ✓	Winter		
9	FW	(Argentina)	Perillo	41		End of contract	Winter		
19	FW	(Peru)	Orejuela	46	Total Chalaco	Loaned out ✓	Winter		

Last updated: 2009-09-04
EU = if holds or not a European Union passport; Country: when 2 flags, 1st flag = country that plays for internationally, 2nd flag = country of birth; N = number on jersey; P = Position (for position name, pause mouse pointer on abbreviation); Name = Name on jersey (for more extensive name, pause mouse pointer on name); Age = age on the day of the signing; Moving from = only indicate the club the player was playing before start playing for this club in this season, for the type of the moving see Status column; Moving to = only indicates the club the player is going to play next, for the type of the moving see Status column; Ends = when the player's current contract ends; n/a = Not applicable.

== Goalscorers ==
Pos	Player	Position	Descentralizado	Copa Libertadores	Total
1	(Peru) Gianfranco Labarthe	FW	12	1	13
2	(Peru) Nolberto Solano	MF	8	2	10
3	(Peru) Piero Alva	FW	5	2	7
4	(Peru) Carlos Orejuela	FW	5	0	5
4	(Mexico) Rodolfo Espinoza	MF	5	0	5
6	(Mexico) Cerda	MF	4	0	4
6	(Brazil) Ronaille Calheira	FW	3	1	4
8	(Argentina) Juan Manuel Perillo	FW	3	0	3
8	(Peru) Raúl Ruidíaz	FW	3	0	3
8	(Peru) Renzo Revoredo	DF	3	0	3
11	(Peru) Johan Vásquez	MF	2	0	2
11	(Peru) Giancarlo Carmona	MF	2	0	2
11	(Argentina) Carlos Galván	DF	2	0	2
14	(Peru) Diego Bustamante	MF	1	0	1
14	(Peru) John Galliquio	DF	1	0	1
14	(Peru) Edgar Villamarín	DF	1	0	1
14	(Peru) Rainer Torres	MF	1	0	1

== Competitions ==
=== Overall ===
Competition	Started round	Final position / round	First match	Last match
Torneo Descentralizado	—	Champion	14 February	13 December
Copa Libertadores	Second Stage	Second Stage	11 February	28 April

Updated to match played 14 December
Source: Competitions

=== Torneo Descentralizado ===
==== First stage ====
===== Standings =====
Pos	Team	Pld	W	D	L	GF	GA	GD	Pts	Second Stage placement
1	Juan Aurich	30	15	10	5	46	31	+15	55	Liguilla A
2	Universitario	30	15	9	6	37	22	+15	54	Liguilla B
3	Alianza Lima	30	15	6	9	37	30	+7	51	Liguilla A
4	Sport Huancayo	30	14	6	10	48	30	+18	48	Liguilla B
5	Universidad César Vallejo	30	13	9	8	41	33	+8	48	Liguilla A

Updated to match(es) played on September 2, 2009. Source: RSSSF
Rules for classification: 1) points; 2) goal difference; 3) number of goals scored.

===== Summary =====
Overall								Home						Away					
Pld	W	D	L	GF	GA	GD	Pts	W	D	L	GF	GA	GD	W	D	L	GF	GA	GD
30	15	9	6	37	22	+15	54	10	3	2	26	10	+16	5	6	4	11	12	−1

Last updated: 2009-09-04.
Source: Depor

===== Results by round =====
Round	1	2	3	4	5	6	7	8	9	10	11	12	13	14	15	16	17	18	19	20	21	22	23	24	25	26	27	28	29	30
Ground	A	H	A	H	A	A	H	A	A	H	A	H	A	A	H	H	A	H	A	H	H	A	H	H	A	H	A	H	H	A
Result	W	W	D	W	L	W	W	L	W	W	D	W	D	L	D	D	W	W	D	W	W	D	L	W	L	W	D	D	L	W
Position	1	1	2	1	2	2	1	2	3	3	3	1	2	3	4	4	3	3	1	1	1	1	1	1	1	1	1	1	2	2

Updated to match(es) played on 2009-08-31. Source: Competitive Matches
A = Away; H = Home; W = Win; D = Draw; L = Loss

==== Second stage ====
===== Standings =====
Pos	Team	Pld	W	D	L	GF	GA	GD	Pts	Qualification
1	Universitario	44	23	12	9	59	32	+27	81	Third Stage and the 2010 Copa Libertadores Second Stage
2	Sport Huancayo	44	21	7	16	65	55	+10	70	
3	Universidad San Martín	44	18	15	11	64	48	+16	69 (Note: U. San Martin lost points won in the first round for fielding four foreign players. The game was a 3-0 loss. These points were not awarded to the opposing team.)	
4	Melgar	44	15	13	16	59	62	−3	58	
5	Cienciano	44	14	16	14	58	63	−5	58	

Updated to match(es) played on December 6, 2009. Source: RSSSF
Rules for classification: 1) points; 2) goal difference; 3) number of goals scored.

===== Summary =====
Overall								Home						Away					
Pld	W	D	L	GF	GA	GD	Pts	W	D	L	GF	GA	GD	W	D	L	GF	GA	GD
14	8	3	3	21	8	+13	27	5	2	0	16	2	+14	3	1	3	5	6	−1

Last updated: 2009-12-14.
Source: Depor

===== Results by round =====
Round	1	2	3	4	5	6	7	8	9	10	11	12	13	14
Ground	H	A	H	A	H	A	H	A	H	A	H	A	H	A
Result	D	D	D	W	W	L	W	W	W	L	W	W	W	L
Position	1	1	1	1	1	1	1	1	1	1	1	1	1	1

Updated to match(es) played on 2009-12-14. Source: Competitive Matches
A = Away; H = Home; W = Win; D = Draw; L = Loss

==== Third stage ====
Pos	Team	Pld	W	D	L	GF	GA	GD	Pts
1	Universitario	2	2	0	0	2	0	+2	6
2	Alianza Lima	2	0	0	2	0	2	−2	0

=== Copa Libertadores ===
==== Group 8 ====
Pos	Team	Pld	W	D	L	GF	GA	GD	Pts
1	(Paraguay) Libertad	6	4	0	2	7	5	+2	12
2	(Mexico) San Luis	6	2	2	2	7	7	0	8
3	(Peru) Universitario	6	2	2	2	6	7	−1	8
4	(Argentina) San Lorenzo	6	2	0	4	6	7	−1	6

== Matches ==
=== Competitive ===
==== Copa Libertadores ====
10 February 2009 Second Stage	Libertad (Paraguay)	2 – 1	(Peru) Universitario	Luque, Paraguay
21:40 UTC-3	M. Maciel 42'; Román 83'	Report	Solano 63'	Stadium: Estadio Feliciano Cáceres; Referee: Federico Beligoy (Argentina)

19 February 2009 Second Stage	Universitario (Peru)	1 – 0	(Argentina) San Lorenzo	Lima, Peru
19:30 UTC-5	Solano 21' (pen.)	Report		Stadium: Estadio Monumental "U"; Referee: Sálvio Fagundes (Brazil)

10 March 2009 Second Stage	Universitario (Peru)	0 – 0	(Mexico) San Luis	Lima, Peru
19:15 UTC-5		Report		Stadium: Estadio Monumental "U"; Attendance: 32,567; Referee: Joaquín Antequera (Bolivia)

18 March 2009 Second Stage	San Luis (Mexico)	2 – 2	(Peru) Universitario	San Luis Potosí, Mexico
21:10 UTC-6	Reyes 25'; Orozco 77'	Report	Alva 34'; Labarthe 90+1'	Stadium: Estadio Alfonso Lastras; Referee: Alfredo Intriago (Ecuador)

7 April 2009 Second Stage	Universitario (Peru)	2 – 1	(Paraguay) Libertad	Lima, Peru
21:30 UTC-5	Calheira 28'; Alva 61'	Report	Ximénez 21'	Stadium: Estadio Monumental "U"; Attendance: 24,923; Referee: Carlos Vera (Ecuador)

28 April 2009 Second Stage	San Lorenzo (Argentina)	2 – 0	(Peru) Universitario	Buenos Aires, Argentina
21:50 UTC-6	Calheira 21' (o.g.); Gómez 24'	Report		Stadium: Estadio Pedro Bidegain; Attendance: 2,856; Referee: Enrique Osses (Chile)

==== Torneo Descentralizado ====
===== First stage =====
15 February 2009 Round 1	Alianza Atlético	1 – 2	Universitario	Sullana, Peru
13:15 UTC-5	J. Rodriguez 56'	Report	Solano 58', 68' (pen.)	Stadium: Estadio Campeones del 36; Referee: Georges Buckley

22 February 2009 Round 2	Universitario	5 – 1	Sport Áncash	Lima, Peru
18:00 UTC-5	Espinoza 43', 45+2' (pen.); Orejuela 58', 80'; Bustamante 87'	Report	J. Yances 37'	Stadium: Estadio Monumental "U"; Referee: Alejandro Villanueva

1 March 2009 Round 3	Cienciano	1 – 1	Universitario	Cusco, Peru
15:30 UTC-5	M. Romero 31' (pen.)	Report	Solano 90+4'	Stadium: Estadio Garcilaso; Referee: Hector Pacheco

6 March 2009 Round 4	Universitario	3 – 0	Total Chalaco	Lima, Peru
19:00 UTC-5	Orejuela 7'; Calheira 82'; Espinoza 90' (pen.)	Report		Stadium: Estadio Monumental "U"; Referee: Manuel Garay

14 March 2009 Round 5	Inti Gas	1 – 0	Universitario	Ayacucho, Peru
13:30 UTC-5	Gonzales 31' (o.g.)	Report		Stadium: Estadio Ciudad de Cumaná; Referee: Percy Rojas

22 March 2009 Round 6	Alianza Lima	0 – 1	Universitario	Lima, Peru
16:00 UTC-5		Report	Galliquio 52'	Stadium: Estadio Alejandro Villanueva; Referee: Victor Hugo Rivera

4 April 2009 Round 7	Universitario	1 – 0	Sporting Cristal	Lima, Peru
18:00 UTC-5	Vásquez 60'	Report		Stadium: Estadio Monumental "U"; Referee: Victor Hugo Carrillo

12 April 2009 Round 8	Juan Aurich	2 – 0	Universitario	Chiclayo, Peru
15:00 UTC-5	Chará 31'; Ibarra 37'	Report		Stadium: Estadio Elias Aguirre; Referee: Manuel Garay

24 April 2009 Round 10	Universitario	2 – 0	Colegio Nacional Iquitos	Lima, Peru
20:00 UTC-5	Labarthe 4'; Perillo 77'	Report		Stadium: Estadio Monumental "U"; Referee: Henry Gambetta

2 May 2009 Round 11	Melgar	0 – 0	Universitario	Arequipa, Peru
19:30 UTC-5		Report		Stadium: Estadio Monumental Virgen de Chapi; Referee: Manuel Garay

9 May 2009 Round 12	Universitario	4 – 1	Sport Huancayo	Lima, Peru
19:30 UTC-5	Perillo 38'; Labarthe 41', 60'; Carmona 58'	Report	M. Huertas 78'	Stadium: Estadio Monumental "U"; Referee: Percy Rojas

13 May 2009 Round 13	Coronel Bolognesi	0 – 0	Universitario	Tacna, Peru
20:00 UTC-5		Report		Stadium: Estadio Jorge Basadre; Referee: Roberto Mauro

17 May 2009 Round 14	Universidad César Vallejo	3 – 1	Universitario	Trujillo, Peru
18:00 UTC-5	M. Ugaz 57'; Salazar 71'; L. Cordero 90+1'	Report	Orejuela 47'	Stadium: Estadio Mansiche; Referee: Hector Pacheco

24 May 2009 Round 15	Universitario	1 – 1	José Gálvez	Lima, Peru
15:30 UTC-5	Perillo 25'	Report	Quina 85' (o.g.)	Stadium: Estadio Monumental "U"; Referee: Percy Rojas

30 May 2009 Round 16	Universitario	1 – 1	Alianza Atlético	Lima, Peru
19:00 UTC-5	Orejuela 73'	Report	S. Aponte 56'	Stadium: Estadio Monumental "U"; Referee: Victor Hugo Rivera

14 June 2009 Round 17	Sport Áncash	1 – 2	Universitario	Huaraz, Peru
11:30 UTC-5	A. Serrano 33'	Report	Espinoza 43'; Labarthe 83'	Stadium: Estadio Rosas Pampa; Referee: Manuel Garay

20 June 2009 Round 18	Universitario	2 – 1	Cienciano	Lima, Peru
18:00 UTC-5	Solano 54' (pen.); Labarhte 67'	Report	Vegas 90+5'	Stadium: Estadio Monumental "U"; Referee: Percy Rojas

24 June 2009 Round 9	San Martín	0 – 1	Universitario	Callao, Peru
19:30 UTC-5		Report	Labarthe 18'	Stadium: Estadio Miguel Grau; Referee: Miguel Santívañez

27 June 2009 Round 19	Total Chalaco	1 – 1	Universitario	Callao, Peru
18:00 UTC-5	Sánchez 54'	Report	Alva 65'	Stadium: Estadio Miguel Grau; Referee: Victor Hugo Rivera

4 July 2009 Round 20	Universitario	2 – 1	Inti Gas	Lima, Peru
18:00 UTC-5	Solano 36'; Vásquez 76'	Report	E. Retamoso 74'	Stadium: Estadio Monumental "U"; Referee: Hector Pacheco

12 July 2009 Round 21	Universitario	2 – 1	Alianza Lima	Lima, Peru
18:00 UTC-5	Labarthe 81'; Alva 88'	Report	Fernández 8'	Stadium: Estadio Monumental "U"; Referee: Victor Hugo Carrillo

18 July 2009 Round 22	Sporting Cristal	1 – 1	Universitario	Callao, Peru
15:00 UTC-5	Hurtado 75'	Report	Labarthe 55'	Stadium: Estadio Miguel Grau; Referee: Victor Hugo Rivera

25 July 2009 Round 23	Universitario	0 – 1	Juan Aurich	Lima, Peru
15:30 UTC-5		Report	Chará 13'	Stadium: Estadio Monumental "U"; Referee: Percy Rojas

29 July 2009 Round 24	Universitario	1 – 0	Universidad de San Martín	Lima, Peru
15:20 UTC-5	Labarthe 88'	Report		Stadium: Estadio Monumental "U"; Referee: Georges Buckley

1 August 2009 Round 25	Colegio Nacional Iquitos	1 – 0	Universitario	Iquitos, Peru
20:00 UTC-5	A. Guerrero 89'	Report		Stadium: Estadio Max Augustín; Referee: Diego Hara

9 August 2009 Round 26	Universitario	1 – 0	Melgar	Lima, Peru
15:30 UTC-5	Labarthe 57'	Report		Stadium: Estadio Monumental "U"; Referee: Miguel Santívañez

16 August 2009 Round 27	Sport Huancayo	0 – 0	Universitario	Huancayo, Peru
13:00 UTC-5		Report		Stadium: Estadio Huancayo; Referee: Victor Hugo Rivera

19 August 2009 Round 28	Universitario	0 – 0	Coronel Bolognesi	Lima, Peru
20:00 UTC-5		Report		Stadium: Estadio Monumental "U"; Referee: Alejandro Villanueva

23 August 2009 Round 29	Universitario	1 – 2	Universidad César Vallejo	Lima, Peru
15:00 UTC-5	Labarthe 90+1'	Report	S. Faiffer 62'; J. Francisco 83' (pen.)	Stadium: Estadio Monumental "U"; Referee: Georges Buckley

29 August 2009 Round 30	Sport Huancayo	0 – 1	Universitario	Chimbote, Peru
15:30 UTC-5		Report	Villamarín 72'	Stadium: Estadio Manuel Rivera Sanchez; Referee: Diego Haro

===== Second stage =====
12 September 2009 Round 31	Universitario	0 – 0	Coronel Bolognesi	Lima, Peru
15:45 UTC-5		Report		Stadium: Estadio Monumental "U"; Referee: Henry Gambetta

16 September 2009 Round 32	Cienciano	1 – 1	Universitario	Cusco, Peru
19:30 UTC-5	Vílchez 90+5'	Report	Carlos Galván 72' (pen.)	Stadium: Estadio Garcilaso; Referee: Georges Buckley

20 September 2009 Round 33	Universitario	0 – 0	Universidad San Martín	Lima, Peru
15:30 UTC-5		Report		Stadium: Estadio Monumental "U"; Referee: Victor Hugo Rivera

27 September 2009 Round 34	Alianza Atlético	0 – 1	Universitario	Piura, Peru
13:30 UTC-5		Report	R. Torres 7'	Stadium: Estadio Miguel Grau; Referee: Diego Haro

4 October 2009 Round 35	Universitario	2 – 1	Total Chalaco	Lima, Peru
13:30 UTC-5	Revoredo 32'; Labarthe 55'	Report	Neyra 13'	Stadium: Estadio Monumental "U"; Referee: Hector Pacheco

18 October 2009 Round 36	Sport Huancayo	1 – 0	Universitario	Huancayo, Peru
13:15 UTC-5	C. Alvarenga 78'	Report		Stadium: Estadio Huancayo; Referee: Roberto Mauro

24 October 2009 Round 37	Universitario	3 – 1	Melgar	Lima, Peru
18:00 UTC-5	Solano 2' (pen.), 11' (pen.); Ruidíaz 61'	Report	Zúñiga 4' (pen.)	Stadium: Estadio Monumental "U"; Referee: Percy Rojas

1 November 2009 Round 38	Coronel Bolognesi	0 – 1	Universitario	Tacna, Peru
18:00 UTC-5		Report	Revoredo 90+2'	Stadium: Estadio Jorge Basadre; Referee: Alejandro Villanueva

4 November 2009 Round 39	Universitario	2 – 0	Cienciano	Lima, Peru
15:30 UTC-5	Cerda 30'; Ruidíaz 54'	Report		Stadium: Estadio Monumental "U"; Referee: Victor Hugo Rivera

14 November 2009 Round 41	Universitario	4 – 0	Alianza Atlético	Lima, Peru
16:00 UTC-5	Alva 26'; Cerda 37'; Revoredo 61'; Carmona 90+1'	Report		Stadium: Estadio Monumental "U"; Referee: Victor Hugo Carrillo

22 November 2009 Round 42	Total Chalaco	0 – 3	Universitario	Callao, Peru
15:30 UTC-5		Report	Alva 51' (pen.); Ruidiaz 55'; Calheira 72'	Stadium: Estadio Miguel Grau; Referee: Julio Alvarez

25 November 2009 Round 40	Universidad San Martín	1 – 0	Universitario	Callao, Peru
19:30 UTC-5	Ludueña 52'	Report		Stadium: Estadio Miguel Grau; Referee: Victor Hugo Carrillo

29 November 2009 Round 43	Universitario	5 – 0	Sport Huancayo	Lima, Peru
15:00 UTC-5	Galván 8'; Calheira 41'; Cerda 58', 89'; Espinoza 64'	Report		Stadium: Estadio Monumental "U"; Referee: Diego Haro

6 December 2009 Round 44	Melgar	5 – 0	Universitario	Arequipa, Peru
15:00 UTC-5	C. Pérez 8', 19', 54', 60'; H. Salas 65'	Report		Stadium: Estadio Mariano Melgar; Referee: Henry Gambetta

===== Finals =====
8 December 2009 First leg	Alianza Lima	0 – 1	Universitario	Lima, Peru
16:00 UTC-5		Report	Alva 28'	Stadium: Estadio Alejandro Villanueva; Referee: Victor Hugo Rivera

13 December 2009 Second leg	Universitario	1 – 0	Alianza Lima	Lima, Peru
15:30 UTC-5	Solano 10' (pen.)	Report		Stadium: Estadio Monumental "U"; Referee: Victor Hugo Carrillo

=== Friendly ===
Match	Date	Competition or tour	Ground	Opponent	Score^{1}	GD
1	28–29 January	Noche Crema 2009	H	Santa Fe (Colombia)	0 - 1	-1
2	1 February	—	A	José Gálvez	0 - 0	0
3	4 February	—	A	Juan Aurich	2 - 1	1
4	7 February	—	H	Saprissa (Costa Rica)	0 - 1	-1
5	6 June	—	A	Juan Aurich	1 - 0	1

Last updated: September 4, 2009
Source: http://www.daleucampeon.4t.com/Amistosos.htm
^{1}Universitario goals come first.
Country's flag depict country of foreign team to that of Universitario.
Ground: H = Home; A = Away; N = Neutral; HR = Home replacement; AR = Away replacement; GD = Goal difference
