= 2010 Club Universitario de Deportes season =

Universitario de Deportes
2010 season
- President: Gino Pinasco; Edmundo Guinea
- Manager: Juan Reynoso (Argentina) Salvador Capitano; José del Solar
- Stadium: Estadio Monumental
- Descentralizado: 4th
- Libertadores: Round of 16
- Top goalscorer: League: Piero Alva (14); All: Piero Alva (14)
Home colours	Away colours

The 2010 season was Universitario de Deportes' 82nd season in the Peruvian Primera División and 45th in the Torneo Descentralizado. This article shows player statistics and all matches (official and friendly) that the club played during the 2010 season.

== Squad information ==
N	Pos.	Nat.	Name	Age	Since	App	Goals	Ends	Transfer fee	Notes
1	GK	(Peru)	Raúl Fernández	40	2007				Youth system	
2	DF	(Peru)	John Galliquio	46	2009					
3	DF	(Argentina)	Carlos Galván	53	2007				$1.2m	
4	DF	(Peru)	Adrián Zela	37	2010					
5	MF	(Peru)	Antonio Gonzales	40	2006				Youth system	
6	MF	(Peru)	Rainer Torres	46	2008				$ 1m	
7	MF	(Peru)	Miguel Angel Torres	44	2007				Youth system	
8	MF	(Peru)	Luis Alberto Ramírez	42	2010 (Winter)			2009		
9	FW	(Peru)	Raúl Ruidíaz	36	2008 (Winter)			2009	Free	
10	MF	(Peru)	Mario Soto	39	2010					
11	FW	(Peru)	Gianfranco Labarthe	42	2008				$ 0.6m	
12	GK	(Peru)	Luis Llontop	41	2006				Youth system	
13	DF	(Peru)	Renzo Revoredo	40	2009					
14	DF	(Peru)	Néstor Duarte	36	2007				Youth system	
15	MF	(Peru)	Jorge Johan Vásquez	42	2008 (Winter)					
16	DF	(Peru)	Yersinio Saldaña	39	2009					
17	MF	(Peru)	Giancarlo Carmona	41	2008 (Winter)					
18	FW	(Peru)	Armando Alfamene	36	2009					
19	FW	(Peru)	Carlos Orejuela	46	2009			2009		
20	MF	(Peru)	Luis Hernández Díaz	45	2010 (Winter)			2009		
21	MF	(Mexico)	Rodolfo Espinoza	40	2009					
23	FW	(Peru)	Piero Alva	47	2009					
24	MF	(Peru)	Juan José Barros	37	2010					
25	GK	(Peru)	Francisco De Paula Bazán	46	2009					
26	DF	(Peru)	Víctor Balta	40	2006				Youth system	
27	DF	(Peru)	Néstor Duarte	36	2007				Youth system	
28	MF	(Peru)	Jesús Rabanal	41	2006				Free	
29	FW	(Peru)	Joyce Conde	35	2009				Youth system	
30	FW	(Peru)	Christian La Torre	36	2009					

- Last updated: 4 November 2008
- Source: Universitario Plantilla
- Ordered by Jersey number.

== Competitions ==
Competition	Started round	Current position / round	Final position / round	First match	Last match
Torneo Descentralizado	—	—	4th	February 13	December 4
Copa Libertadores	Second stage	—	Round of 16	February 11	May 5

Updated to match played 3 January 2011
Source: Competitions

=== Torneo Descentralizado ===
Universitario participates in the Torneo Descentralizado, Peru's highest division.

==== First stage ====
The first stage of the Torneo Descentralizado consisted of 16 teams where Universitario played 30 matches; one home game and one away game against each team. The winner of the first stage was eligible to play in first stage of the 2011 Copa Libertadores.

===== Standings =====
Pos	Team	Pld	W	D	L	GF	GA	GD	Pts	Second Stage placement
3	Alianza Lima	30	17	5	8	50	31	+19	56	Liguilla A
4	Universidad César Vallejo	30	16	5	9	48	30	+18	53	Liguilla B
5	Universitario	30	16	5	9	43	22	+21	51 (Note: Universitario were deducted 2 points for failing to pay a former manager Ricardo Gareca.)	Liguilla A
6	Juan Aurich	30	13	9	8	42	31	+11	48	Liguilla B
7	Sporting Cristal	30	12	8	10	43	42	+1	44	Liguilla A

Updated to match(es) played on August 29, 2010. Source: Soccerway
Rules for classification: 1) points; 2) goal difference; 3) number of goals scored.

===== Summary =====
Overall								Home						Away					
Pld	W	D	L	GF	GA	GD	Pts	W	D	L	GF	GA	GD	W	D	L	GF	GA	GD
30	16	5	9	43	22	+21	53	9	2	4	22	10	+12	7	3	5	21	12	+9

Last updated: 13 November 2010.
Source: Depor

===== Results by round =====
Round	1	2	3	4	5	6	7	8	9	10	11	12	13	14	15	16	17	18	19	20	21	22	23	24	25	26	27	28	29	30
Ground	H	A	H	A	H	A	H	A	H	A	H	A	H	A	H	A	H	A	H	A	H	A	H	A	H	A	H	A	H	A
Result	L	L	L	W	W	W	W	D	W	L	W	L	W	D	W	L	W	W	D	W	L	D	L	W	W	L	D	W	W	W
Position	16	16	16	16	15	9	7	8	4	8	4	5	4	4	4	5	3	4	3	3	3	4	4	4	4	5	5	5	5	5

Updated to match(es) played on 16 June 2010. Source: Matches
A = Away; H = Home; W = Win; D = Draw; L = Loss

===== Matches =====
14 February 2010 Round 1	Universitario	1–2	Inti Gas Deportes	Estadio Monumental, Lima
16:30	Piríz 56' (pen.)	Report	G. Tomasevich 23'; M. Tenemas 65'	Referee: Iván Chang

21 February 2010 Round 2	Juan Aurich	2–1	Universitario	Estadio Elías Aguirre, Chiclayo
15:30	Zela 22' (o.g.); Ciciliano 70'	Report	Piríz 36'	Referee: Hector Pacheco

2 March 2010 Round 3	Universitario	1–2	Sporting Cristal	Estadio Monumental, Lima
20:00	Vásquez 18'	Report	Lobatón 31'; Yotún 87'	Referee: Henry Gambetta

13 March 2010 Round 5	Universitario	1–0	José Gálvez	Estadio Monumental, Lima
20:30	Alva 77'	Report		Referee: Miguel Magallanes

19 March 2010 Round 6	Colegio Nacional Iquitos	0–2	Universitario	Estadio Max Augustín, Iquitos
20:00		Report	Galván 36'; Labarthe 71'	Referee: Percy Rojas

28 March 2010 Round 7	Universitario	2–0	Cienciano	Estadio Monumental, Lima
18:00	Piríz 41'; Alva 86'	Report		Referee: Víctor Hugo Rivera

4 April 2010 Round 8	Alianza Lima	0–0	Universitario	Estadio Alejandro Villanueva, Lima
18:00		Report		Referee: Georges Buckley

11 April 2010 Round 9	Universitario	2–0	Universidad César Vallejo	Estadio Monumental, Lima
18:00	Piríz 45' (pen.); Galván 89' (pen.)	Report		Referee: Victor Hugo Carrillo

21 April 2010 Round 4	Total Chalaco	1–3	Universitario	Estadio Segundo Aranda Torres, Huacho
15:30	A. Serrano 46'	Report	Barros 16'; Vásquez 90+1'; Ruidíaz 90+5'	Referee: Albert Caballero

25 April 2010 Round 11	Universitario	2–1	Alianza Atlético	Estadio Monumental, Lima
18:10	Soto 21'; Ruidíaz 74'	Report	Kahn 51'	Referee: Roberto Mauro

8 May 2010 Round 13	Universitario	3–1	FBC Melgar	Estadio Monumental, Lima
16:00	Alva 71'; Alva 77'; Labarthe 90+2'	Report	Meza Cuadra 74'	Referee: Robert Rafael

16 May 2010 Round 14	Universidad San Martín de Porres	1–1	Universitario	Estadio Miguel Grau, Callao
15:30	Silva 71'	Report	Alva 90+1'	Referee: Victor Hugo Carrillo

19 May 2010 Round 12	León de Huánuco	1–0	Universitario	Estadio Heraclio Tapia, Huánuco
13:15	Espinoza 67'	Report		Referee: Hector Pacheco

23 May 2010 Round 15	Universitario	3–0	Sport Boys	Estadio Monumental, Lima
18:00	Alva 3' 14' 59'	Report		Referee: Roberto Mauro

29 May 2010 Round 16	Inti Gas Deportes	2–1	Universitario	Estadio Ciudad de Cumaná, Ayacucho
15:30	Mina Polo 14' 60' (pen.)	Report	Piríz 80' (pen.)	Referee: Victor Hugo Carrillo

2 June 2010 Round 10	Sport Huancayo	1–0	Universitario	Estadio Huancayo, Huancayo
13:15	Hernández 63'	Report		Referee: Manuel Garay

5 June 2010 Round 17	Universitario	1–0	Juan Aurich	Estadio Monumental, Lima
20:15	Espinoza 83'	Report		Referee: Victor Hugo Rivera

13 June 2010 Round 19	Universitario	0–0	Total Chalaco	Estadio Monumental, Lima
20:15		Report		Referee: Eduardo Chirinos

17 June 2010 Round 18	Sporting Cristal	1–2	Universitario	Estadio San Martín de Porres, Lima
14:00	Sanchez 90+9'	Report	Ruidíaz 17'; Galliquio 20'	Referee: Hector Pacheco

19 June 2010 Round 20	José Gálvez	0–3	Universitario	Estadio Manuel Rivera Sanchez, Chimbote
19:30		Report	Piríz 5'; R. Torres 42'; Ruidíaz 53'	Referee: Luis Seminario

26 June 2010 Round 21	Universitario	1–2	Colegio Nacional Iquitos	Estadio Monumental, Lima
19:00	Ramírez 81'	Report	A. Ramúa 32'; J.P. Vergara 56' (pen.)	Referee: Manuel Garay

4 July 2010 Round 22	Cienciano	1–1	Universitario	Estadio Garcilaso, Cusco
15:30	Montes 90+1'	Report	Labarthe 31'	Referee: Victor Hugo Carrillo

10 July 2010 Round 23	Universitario	0–1	Alianza Lima	Estadio Monumental, Lima
16:00		Report	Hurtado 46'	Referee: Victor Hugo Rivera

18 July 2010 Round 24	Universidad César Vallejo	0–1	Universitario	Estadio Mansiche, Trujillo
15:30		Report	Rabanal 71'	Referee: Hector Pacheco

25 July 2010 Round 25	Universitario	3–0	Sport Huancayo	Estadio Monumental, Lima
15:30	Alva 6' 40'; Labarthe 77'	Report		Referee: Miguel Santiváñez

31 July 2010 Round 26	Alianza Atlético	1–0	Universitario	Estadio Miguel Grau, Piura
17:30	Jiménez 44'	Report		Referee: Julio Álvarez

8 August 2010 Round 27	Universitario	1–1	León de Huánuco	Estadio Monumental, Lima
15:30	Labarthe 6'	Report	Perea 80' (pen.)	Referee: Iván Chang

13 August 2010 Round 28	FBC Melgar	0–4	Universitario	Estadio Virgen de Chapi, Arequipa
19:45		Report	Ramírez 44'; Ruidíaz 50'; Labarthe 54'; Vásquez 75'	Referee: Henry Gambetta

21 August 2010 Round 29	Universitario	1–0	Universidad San Martín de Porres	Estadio Monumental, Lima
15:00	Labarthe 27'	Report		Referee: Víctor Hugo Rivera

29 August 2010 Round 30	Sport Boys	1–2	Universitario	Estadio Miguel Grau, Callao
15:00	Guevara 24'	Report	Ramírez 8' 76'	Referee: Percy Rojas

==== Second stage ====
Universitario finished 5th and played against the teams that placed an odd number at the end of the First stage. The Second stage consisted of 14 matches (7 home and 7 away games) for Universitario. The winner of the group qualified to the 2011 Copa Libertadores.

===== Standings =====
Pos	Team	Pld	W	D	L	GF	GA	GD	Pts	Qualification
1	Universidad San Martín	44	28	7	9	87	39	+48	92 (Note: Universidad San Martin obtained 1 point by being the 2010 Torneo de Promoción y Reserva runner-up.)	Third Stage and the 2011 Copa Libertadores Second Stage
2	Alianza Lima	44	22	12	10	70	48	+22	78	
3	Universitario	44	21	11	12	55	31	+24	72 (Note: Universitario were docked 2 points for failing to pay a former manager Ricardo Gareca.)	
4	Sporting Cristal	44	18	10	16	58	54	+4	64	
5	Inti Gas	44	17	5	22	63	69	−6	56	

Updated to match(es) played on December 5, 2010. Source: Soccerway
Rules for classification: 1) points; 2) goal difference; 3) number of goals scored.

===== Summary =====
Overall								Home						Away					
Pld	W	D	L	GF	GA	GD	Pts	W	D	L	GF	GA	GD	W	D	L	GF	GA	GD
14	5	6	3	12	9	+3	21	4	3	0	9	4	+5	1	3	3	3	5	−2

Last updated: 2011-06-04.
Source: Matches

===== Results by round =====
Round	1	2	3	4	5	6	7	8	9	10	11	12	13	14
Ground	H	A	H	A	H	A	H	A	H	A	H	A	H	A
Result	W	L	D	L	W	D	W	D	D	D	W	W	D	L
Position	3	3	3	3	3	3	3	3	3	3	3	3	3	3

Updated to match(es) played on 2011-06-04. Source: Matches
A = Away; H = Home; W = Win; D = Draw; L = Loss

===== Matches =====
11 September 2010 Round 31	Universitario	1–0	Total Chalaco	Estadio Monumental, Lima
20:00	Ramírez 48'	Report		Referee: Henry Gambetta

18 September 2010 Round 32	Inti Gas Deportes	1–0	Universitario	Estadio Ciudad de Cumaná, Ayacucho
13:30	Ruiz 75'	Report		Referee: Iván Chang

25 September 2010 Round 33	Universitario	0–0	Alianza Lima	Estadio Monumental, Lima
16:00		Report		Referee: Victor Hugo Carrillo

30 September 2010 Round 34	Universidad San Martín de Porres	1–0	Universitario	Estadio Miguel Grau, Callao
15:30	Arriola 62'	Report		Referee: Manuel Garay

17 October 2010 Round 35	Universitario	3–1	José Gálvez	Estadio Monumental, Lima
18:00	M. Torres 45'; Gigena 53'; Alva 88'	Report	Pajuelo 35'	Referee: Albert Caballero

23 October 2010 Round 36	Sporting Cristal	0–0	Universitario	Estadio San Martín de Porres, Lima
15:00		Report		Referee: Victor Hugo Rivera

27 October 2010 Round 37	Universitario	2–1	Colegio Nacional Iquitos	Estadio Monumental, Lima
20:30	R. Torres 25'; Galliquio 84'	Report	Zamora 10'	Referee: Miguel Magallanes

31 October 2010 Round 38	Total Chalaco	0–0	Universitario	Estadio Segundo Aranda Torres, Huacho
15:30		Report		Referee: Iván Chang

5 November 2010 Round 39	Universitario	1–1	Inti Gas Deportes	Estadio Monumental, Lima
20:00	Alva 58'	Report	Mendoza 90+1'	Referee: Victor Hugo Carrillo

10 October 2010 Round 40	Alianza Lima	2–2	Universitario	Estadio Alejandro Villanueva, Lima
18:30	Soto 43'; Fleitas 86'	Report	M. Torres 33'; Villamarín 56' (o.g.)	Referee: Georges Buckley

14 November 2010 Round 41	Universitario	1–0	Universidad San Martín de Porres	Estadio Monumental, Lima
15:30	Alva 68'	Report		Referee: Henry Gambetta

20 October 2010 Round 42	José Gálvez	0–1	Universitario	Estadio Manuel Rivera Sanchez, Chimbote
18:00		Report	Ruidíaz 90'	Referee: Victor Hugo Rivera

28 November 2010 Round 43	Universitario	1–1	Sporting Cristal	Estadio Monumental, Lima
15:00	Ruidíaz 90+1'	Report	Pando 70'	Referee: Manuel Garay

4 December 2010 Round 44	Colegio Nacional Iquitos	1–0	Universitario	Estadio Max Augustín, Iquitos
21:15	Rengifo 44'	Report		Referee: Robert Rafael

=== Copa Libertadores ===
Universitario qualified to the 2010 Copa Libertadores as 2009 season champion. They were drawn into Group 4 with Libertad, which they faced last Copa Libertadores, Lanús, and Clausura champion Blooming. They finished second and advanced to the Round of 16 as the 5th best second-placed team.

==== Group 4 ====
Pos	Team	Pld	W	D	L	GF	GA	GD	Pts
1	(Paraguay) Libertad	6	3	3	0	10	3	+7	12
2	(Peru) Universitario	6	2	4	0	5	2	+3	10
3	(Argentina) Lanús	6	2	2	2	6	6	0	8
4	(Bolivia) Blooming	6	0	1	5	3	13	−10	1

February 11, 2010 Round 1	Blooming (Bolivia)	1–2	(Peru) Universitario	Estadio Ramón Aguilera, Santa Cruz
21:30 UTC−04:00	Gómez 89'	Report	Orejuela 52'; Espinoza 76'	Attendance: 10,600; Referee: Julio Quintana (Paraguay)

February 17, 2010 Round 2	Universitario (Peru)	2–0	(Argentina) Lanús	Estadio Monumental, Lima
21:30 UTC−05:00	Alva 18'; Labarthe 88'	Report		Attendance: 12,507; Referee: Juan Soto (Venezuela)

February 25, 2010 Round 3	Universitario (Peru)	0–0	(Paraguay) Libertad	Estadio Monumental, Lima
21:20 UTC−05:00		Report		Attendance: 16,530; Referee: Omar Ponce (Ecuador)

March 23, 2010 Round 4	Libertad (Paraguay)	1–1	(Peru) Universitario	Estadio Defensores del Chaco, Asunción
21:45 UTC−03:00	Ayala 56'	Report	Ramírez 87'	Attendance: 270; Referee: Salvio Fagundes (Brazil)

April 6, 2010 Round 5	Universitario (Peru)	0–0	(Bolivia) Blooming	Estadio Monumental, Lima
20:30 UTC−05:00		Report		Attendance: 18,884; Referee: Heber Lopes (Brazil)

April 15, 2010 Round 6	Lanús (Argentina)	0–0	(Peru) Universitario	Estadio Néstor Díaz Pérez, Lanús
19:30 UTC−03:00		Report		Attendance: 4,198; Referee: Carlos Simon (Brazil)

==== Round of 16 ====
In the Round of 16, Universitario faced three-time champion São Paulo.

April 28, 2010 First leg	Universitario (Peru)	0 – 0	(Brazil) São Paulo	Estadio Monumental, Lima
17:30 (UTC-5)		Report		Attendance: 30,000; Referee: Saúl Laverni (Argentina)

May 4, 2010 Second leg	São Paulo (Brazil)	0 – 0 (0 – 0 agg.) (3 – 1 p)	(Peru) Universitario	Estádio do Morumbi, São Paulo
19:30 (UTC-3)		Report		Attendance: 50,000; Referee: Carlos Torres (Paraguay)
	Penalties
	Ceni (penalty missed); Hernanes (penalty scored); Marcelinho (penalty scored); Dagoberto (penalty scored)		(penalty scored) Ramírez; (penalty missed) Alva; (penalty missed) Galván; (penalty missed) Labarthe

== Goalscorers ==
Player	Pos	Descentralizado	Copa Libertadores	Total
(Peru) Piero Alva	FW	13	1	14
(Peru) Gianfranco Labarthe	FW	7	1	8
(Peru) Raúl Ruidíaz	FW	7	0	7
(Uruguay) Víctor Piríz	FW	6	0	6
(Peru) Luis Ramírez	MF	5	1	6
(Peru) Jorge Johan Vásquez	MF	3	0	3
(Argentina) Carlos Galván	DF	2	0	2
(Mexico) Rodolfo Espinoza	MF	1	0	2
(Peru) John Galliquio	DF	2	0	2
(Peru) Miguel Angel Torres	MF	2	0	2
(Peru) Rainer Torres	MF	2	0	2
(Peru) Carlos Orejuela	FW	0	1	1
(Peru) Juan José Barros	FW	1	0	1
(Peru) Mario Soto	FW	1	0	1
(Peru) Jesús Rabanal	MF	1	0	1
(Argentina) Darío Gigena	FW	1	0	1
