= 2009 FBC Melgar season =

FBC Melgar
2009 season
- Stadium: Estadio Monumental Virgen de Chapi
- Torneo Descentralizado: Primera Etapa: Tenth (10°); Liguilla Par: Fourth (4°); Aggregate Table: Eighth (8°); Eight National (8°)
| Home colours | Away colours | Third colours |

The 2009 FBC Melgar season were the Ninety-Fifth (95.º) of the club from its foundation in 1915, Forty (40) participations in the top-flight of Peruvian Primera División (of 93 Editions) with denomination Torneo Descentralizado. In Previous Season the club qualified as 8th Place of the 2008 Torneo Descentralizado.

Melgar were a of sixteen (16) clubs in the Forty-Fourth edition (44.º) Torneo Descentralizado, the competition most important of the Peruvian football. The club played the Peruvian Primera División.

== Torneo Descentralizado ==
=== Primera etapa ===
| Pos | Team | Pld | W | D | L | GF | GA | GD | Pts |
|---|---|---|---|---|---|---|---|---|---|
| 9 | Inti Gas | 30 | 11 | 8 | 11 | 36 | 31 | +5 | 41 |
| 10 | FBC Melgar | 30 | 11 | 8 | 11 | 36 | 41 | -5 | 41 |
| 11 | José Gálvez FBC | 30 | 11 | 6 | 13 | 28 | 37 | -9 | 39 |

== See also ==
- FBC Melgar
- 2009 Torneo Descentralizado
