= Johan Vásquez =

Johan Vásquez may refer to:

- Johan Vásquez (footballer, born 1984), Peruvian footballer
- Johan Vásquez (footballer, born 1998), Mexican footballer
