= Ronaille Calheira =

Brazilian footballer

Personal information
- Full name: Ronaille Calheira Seará
- Date of birth: March 23, 1984 (age 42)
- Place of birth: Bahia, Brazil
- Height: 1.80 m (5 ft 11 in)
- Position: Forward

Team information
- Current team: Cultural Santa Rosa

Youth career
- 1998–2001: Atlético Mineiro
- 2001–2003: Colo-Colo (Regatas)

Senior career*
Years	Team	Apps	(Gls)
2004–2009	Colo Colo	18	(21)
2008	→ Deportes Quindío (loan)	16	(5)
2008	→ Sport Ancash (loan)	21	(15)
2009–2012	Universitario de Deportes	27	(3)
2010	→ León de Huánuco (loan)	36	(13)
2011	→ América de Cali (loan)	14	(2)
2011	→ Atlético Huila (loan)	14	(4)
2012	→ The Strongest (loan)	4	(2)
2012	Yanbian Funde	5	(2)
2012–2013	León de Huánuco	13	(3)
2013	Salgueiro	7	(5)
2013–2014	Tarxien Rainbows	19	(17)
2014	Birkirkara	24	(20)
2015	Águila	19	(4)
2015	Atlético San Cristóbal		
2015	Bylis Ballsh	6	(1)
2016–2017	Sport Áncash	33	(10)
2018	Deportivo Hualgayoc	21	(7)
2019–	Cultural Santa Rosa	10	(8)
- * Club domestic league appearances and goals

Ronaille Calheira Seará (born March 23, 1984, in Bahia, Brazil) is a Brazilian football player who plays for Peruvian club Cultural Santa Rosa. Calheira plays at the striker position.

== Titles ==
Season	Club	Title
Campeonato Baiano (2006)	Colo Colo	Campeonato Baiano
Campeonato Descentralizado 2009	Universitario	Primera División Peruana
