= Diego Bustamante =

Peruvian footballer (born 1983)

Personal information
- Full name: Diego Enrique Bustamante Gutiérrez
- Date of birth: 21 February 1983 (age 43)
- Place of birth: Lima, Peru
- Height: 1.77 m (5 ft 10 in)
- Position: Midfielder

Team information
- Current team: León de Huánuco
- Number: 20

Youth career
- Universitario de Deportes

Senior career*
Years	Team	Apps	(Gls)
2000	Virgen de Chapi	?	(1)
2001	Sport Coopsol Trujillo	?	
2002	Huracán	0	(0)
2003	Sport Boys	?	
2004	Universidad San Martín	?	
2004–2005	FBC Melgar	57	(5)
2006	Sport Boys	?	
2007–2008	Alianza Atlético	67	(12)
2009	Universitario de Deportes	13	(1)
2010–2011	Cienciano	33	(2)
2012	Cobresol	0	(0)
2012	Los Caimanes	14	(2)
2013–	León de Huánuco	1	(0)
- * Club domestic league appearances and goals as of 21 April 2013

Diego Enrique Bustamante Gutiérrez (born 21 February 1983) is a Peruvian footballer who plays as a midfielder. He currently plays for León de Huánuco in the Peruvian First Division.

== Honours ==
=== Club ===
Universitario de Deportes:

- Peruvian First Division: 2009
