= Julian Uccello =

Canadian soccer player (born 1986)

Personal information
- Full name: Julian Paolo Uccello
- Date of birth: October 30, 1986 (age 40)
- Place of birth: Toronto, Ontario, Canada
- Height: 5 ft 11 in (1.80 m)
- Position: Striker

Youth career
- Richmond Hill SC
- Thornhill SC
- Kleinburg-Nobleton SC
- Woodbridge Strikers
- Manchester United
- AC Milan

Senior career*
Years	Team	Apps	(Gls)
2003–2004	AC Milan Berretti	11	(10)
2004–2005	→ Savona (loan)	32	(24)
2005–2006	AC Sansovino	9	(2)
2005	→ Sansepolcro (loan)	13	(8)
2006–2007	Forte dei Marmi	25	(18)
2007–2008	Rivarolese	29	(19)
2008–2009	Casale	32	(24)
2009–2012	FC Crotone	22	(1)
2009–2010	→ Bellaria (loan)	30	(10)
2011	→ Casale (loan)	6	(5)
2012	York Region Shooters		
2014	Woodbridge Strikers		

International career^{‡}
2005	Canada U-20	2	(0)
- * Club domestic league appearances and goals as of October 24, 2018 ‡ National team caps and goals as of October 2, 2010

Julian Paolo Uccello (born October 30, 1986) is a Canadian soccer player.

== Career ==
=== Youth ===
From the age of 5 to 15, Julian had played with youth clubs in Ontario, including Richmond Hill SC, Thornhill SC, Kleinburg Nobleton SC and Woodbridge Strikers, before moving overseas. Julian secured a trial with Manchester United for six months, playing a league game with the U-17 team, scoring a goal in his only game for the club. Julian then went on to trial with the Bolton Wanderers of the Premier League a year later. Following these trials in England, Uccello found a home to continue his footballing development in Italy, first being brought over by Lazio, Ultimately, signing with A.C. Milan marked a historic milestone, as he became the first Canadian to join one of the most prestigious football clubs in the sport’s history.

=== Professional ===
After progressing through the youth ranks of A.C. Milan, Julian Uccello was loaned in 2004 to Savona 1907 F.B.C. in Serie D, where he made an immediate impact by scoring 19 goals in his debut season—just one goal short of the league’s all-time single-season record held by Panucci. Following the season, Uccello was called up to the under 20 World Cup Canadian national team and was a part of the World Cup qualifying. Following the conclusion of his loan spell, Uccello was released by Milan and subsequently transferred to AC Sansovino.

At Sansovino, Uccello continued to establish himself as a prolific forward. In 2007, he captured the Golden Boot as the league’s top scorer. In 2008, he captured the golden boot for Casale Calcio netting 31 goals and leading them to success all the way to the final of the playoffs. His strong performances earned him a contract in the summer of 2009 with F.C. Crotone, then competing in Italy’s professional tiers. Shortly after, he was loaned to A.C. Bellaria Igea Marina in Serie C2, where he scored 10 goals over 30 matches. He returned to Crotone and re-signed on a three-year deal.

Uccello gained national attention in June 2009, when he represented the Canadian All-Stars in the Zidane & Friends All-Star Match held at BMO Field. The charity event featured legendary international players against a selection of Canadian talent. Uccello opened the scoring with a memorable goal in front of the South Stand, celebrating in front of his grandfather, Paolo Uccello. The match ended in a 3–3 draw. He made his official debut for F.C. Crotone on September 4, 2010, in a 1–1 away draw against former Serie A club Torino F.C. In January 2011, Uccello was loaned to A.S. Casale Calcio, returning to a club where he had previously played during the 2008–09 season.. In an interview he said "Both Crotone and Casale have agreed and have assured me that I'm there for one role only and that is to be their first line striker for the next six months." Uccello made his return appearance for Casale on January 15, 2011 in a 5–0 loss to Pro Patria and was elected as the Captain of Casale for the balance of the year. He returned to Crotone after his loan from Casale and remained until January 2012, when he negotiated a release from the team with a year and a half remaining on his contract.

Uccello has been the top goal scorer for five of the seven teams he has played for in Italy. Uccello, with 128 goals in Italy, has a scoring average of one goal every 59 minutes played (total 19,490 minutes), up to the end of his 2012 season. In 2012, he returned to Canada to play with the York Region Shooters in the Canadian Soccer League. In 2014, he played in League1 Ontario with Woodbridge Strikers.

=== International ===
Uccello first represented Canada with the under-20 team at the 2005 CONCACAF U-20 Tournament, in which Canada won Group B, going undefeated winning all three games. Julian was not a part of the Canada national team plans until early In October, 2010, senior national team coach Stephen Hart named him in the 18 man Canada squad to play a friendly on October 8 versus Ukraine. He failed to make an appearance in the 2–2 away draw versus Ukraine, with goals for Canada from Atiba Hutchinson and Simeon Jackson.

== Personal life ==
Julian has two younger brothers who are twins, Luca and Michael Uccello. He also has an older sister Melissa. Julian was diagnosed with multiple sclerosis in 2011, which caused him to retire from professional soccer.
