= Internacional de Toronto C.F. =

Internacional de Toronto
- Full name: Internacional de Toronto C.F.
- Nickname: Inter Toronto
- Founded: 2014
- Dissolved: 2014
- Stadium: Lamport Stadium, Toronto, Ontario
- Capacity: 9,600
- President: Juan Ramirez Gaston
- Head coach: Nolberto Solano
- League: League1 Ontario
- Website: https://web.archive.org/web/20141217163200/http://interdetorontocf.com/

Internacional de Toronto C.F. was a short-lived Canadian soccer club founded and dissolved in 2014 and based in Toronto, Ontario. The club played in League1 Ontario, part of the third division of the Canadian soccer league system. The club played its home games out of Lamport Stadium and was coached by former Peru national team player, Nolberto Solano. The club's colours were orange and blue.

== History ==
Internacional de Toronto was announced as one of the founding members of the newly formed League1 Ontario on April 8, 2014. Former Peru national team player Nolberto Solano was named as the team's head coach on May 1, 2014.

Internacional played its first match against Windsor Stars during the league's opening weekend on May 31, 2014, at The Soccer Centre in Vaughan, Ontario, a 2–2 draw. The club would follow its inaugural match with a 2–0 loss to Durham United FC on June 8, 2014.

On July 22, 2014, the club had its licensing agreement terminated due to issues regarding the payment of player salaries. The team had over three months of debt at the time of their termination. The club had played seven league matches at the time of their termination, earning one draw to go with six losses.

== Season ==
Season	League	Teams	Record	Rank	League Cup	Ref
2014 (Note: Internacional was expelled from the league midway through the season, with their stats removed from the standings, making their official record 0–0–0. They also played one match in the League Cup, prior to their expulsion, a 4–1 loss.)	League1 Ontario	10	0–1–6	Expelled	Expelled	

== Notable former players ==
The following players have either played at the professional or international level, either before or after playing for the League1 Ontario team:

- (Canada) Raheem Edwards
- (Canada) Victor Gallo
