= Victor Gallo =

Canadian soccer player (born 1991)

Personal information
- Full name: Victor Miguel Gallo
- Date of birth: December 8, 1991 (age 34)
- Place of birth: Toronto, Ontario, Canada
- Height: 1.78 m (5 ft 10 in)
- Position: Defender

College career
Years	Team	Apps	(Gls)
2012	Seneca College	7	(0)

Senior career*
Years	Team	Apps	(Gls)
2009–2010	North York Astros		
2014	Internacional de Toronto		
2014	Woodbridge Strikers		
2015	Canadian	6	(0)
2017–2021	Blue Devils FC (Note: Oakville Blue Devils FC changed its name to Blue Devils FC in 2021)	60	(3)
2022	ProStars FC	20	(0)
2023	Scrosoppi FC	18	(0)
- * Club domestic league appearances and goals as of September 2, 2023

Victor Gallo (born December 8, 1991) is a Canadian soccer player.

== Playing career ==
Gallo began his career in 2009 with the North York Astros of the Canadian Soccer League.

In 2014, he appeared for Internacional de Toronto in League1 Ontario, scoring in his debut against Windsor Stars. After Internacional was removed from the league, he joined the Woodbridge Strikers.

In 2015, he went abroad to Uruguay to sign with Canadian Soccer Club of the Uruguayan Segunda División. During his time with the club he appeared in 6 matches.

Beginning in 2017, he began playing for Oakville Blue Devils FC in League1 Ontario. On May 19, 2017, he made his debut for the Blue Devils and scored his first goal with a chip shot from 40 yards out against FC London. During his time with the Blue Devils, he served as team captain. In 2017, he was named to the mid-season all-star game against the PLSQ all-stars and was named to the year-end Third Team All-Star. In 2019, he was named a Second Team All-Star.

In 2022, he joined ProStars FC.

In 2023, he signed with Scrosoppi FC.
