= Nolberto Solano =

Peruvian footballer (born 1974)

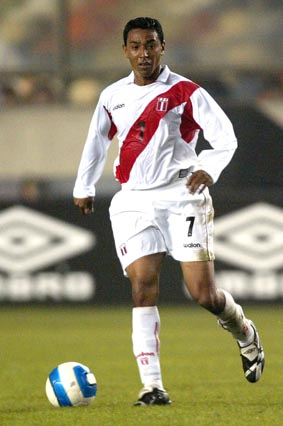
- Solano with Peru in 2007

Personal information
- Full name: Nolberto Albino Solano Todco
- Date of birth: 12 December 1974 (age 51)
- Place of birth: Callao, Peru
- Height: 1.75 m (5 ft 9 in)
- Position: Midfielder

Team information
- Current team: Pakistan (manager)

Youth career
- 1987–1990: Alianza Lima
- 1991–1992: Sporting Cristal

Senior career*
Years	Team	Apps	(Gls)
1993	Sporting Cristal	11	(1)
1993	Deportivo Municipal	27	(7)
1994–1997	Sporting Cristal	97	(31)
1997–1998	Boca Juniors	32	(5)
1998–2004	Newcastle United	172	(29)
2004–2005	Aston Villa	49	(8)
2005–2007	Newcastle United	58	(8)
2007–2008	West Ham United	23	(4)
2008	AEL	17	(2)
2009	Universitario	32	(10)
2010	Leicester City	13	(0)
2010–2011	Hull City	11	(0)
2011–2012	Hartlepool United	14	(2)
Total		556	(107)

International career
1994–2009	Peru	95	(20)

Managerial career
- 2012: Universitario
- 2013: José Gálvez
- 2014: Internacional Toronto
- 2019–2020: Peru Olympic
- 2023: AFC Eskilstuna
- 2024: Blyth Spartans
- 2024: San Marcos
- 2024–2025: Santos
- 2025: Pakistan U23
- 2025–: Pakistan
- * Club domestic league appearances and goals

Nolberto Albino Solano Todco (born 12 December 1974) is a Peruvian professional football manager and former player who is the manager of the Pakistan national team.

Solano spent much of his career in the Premier League, primarily with Newcastle United, and also with Aston Villa and West Ham United. He became the first Peruvian to play in the Premier League, and appear in the FA Cup final. He is considered a cult hero at the Tyneside club, and was also noted for his trumpet playing and formed his own salsa band named The Geordie Latinos. He has described himself as an "adopted Geordie."

Solano is a popular figure in his native Peru, where he is seen as one of the most famous Peruvians, appearing on telephone cards and having his wedding televised live. He played 95 times for the national team between 1994 and 2009, including at the 1995, 1999 and 2004 Copa América and the 2000 CONCACAF Gold Cup.

Towards the end of his career, he went into coaching, and was first-team coach at non-league side Newcastle Benfield, while contracted to Hartlepool United. He had short spells at Universitario and José Gálvez, and was manager of Internacional Toronto for a few matches, before the club had its licensing agreement terminated. From 2015 to 2022, Solano was involved within the national team setup, as assistant manager to Ricardo Gareca and manager of the Olympic team. In 2023, he briefly led AFC Eskilstuna in the Swedish Superettan, before another brief term as manager of Blyth Spartans in 2024.

== Club career ==
=== Early career ===
Solano signed his first professional contract with the Peruvian Primera División side Sporting Cristal in 1992 at the age of 17. He made his league debut on 13 April 1992 in his team's 2–0 win against San Agustín. Towards the end of his first season at Sporting Cristal, he signed a one-year contract with Deportivo Municipal, before returning to Cristal at the end of 1993. He was part of the Sporting Cristal squad of the 1990s during which the club won the Peru Primera División Championships (1994, 1995 and 1996) and reached the finals of the 1997 Copa Libertadores. Along with Roberto Palacios, Flavio Maestri, Julinho and Jorge Soto, he was one of Sporting Cristal's most recognized players of the era.

=== Boca Juniors ===
In 1997, aged 22, he signed for Argentinian side Boca Juniors where he became a teammate of Diego Maradona, who nicknamed Solano the 'Maestrito'. Solano said in 2004 that he would like to play for Boca Juniors again, but admitted he was perhaps too old for the ambition to be realized.

=== Newcastle United ===
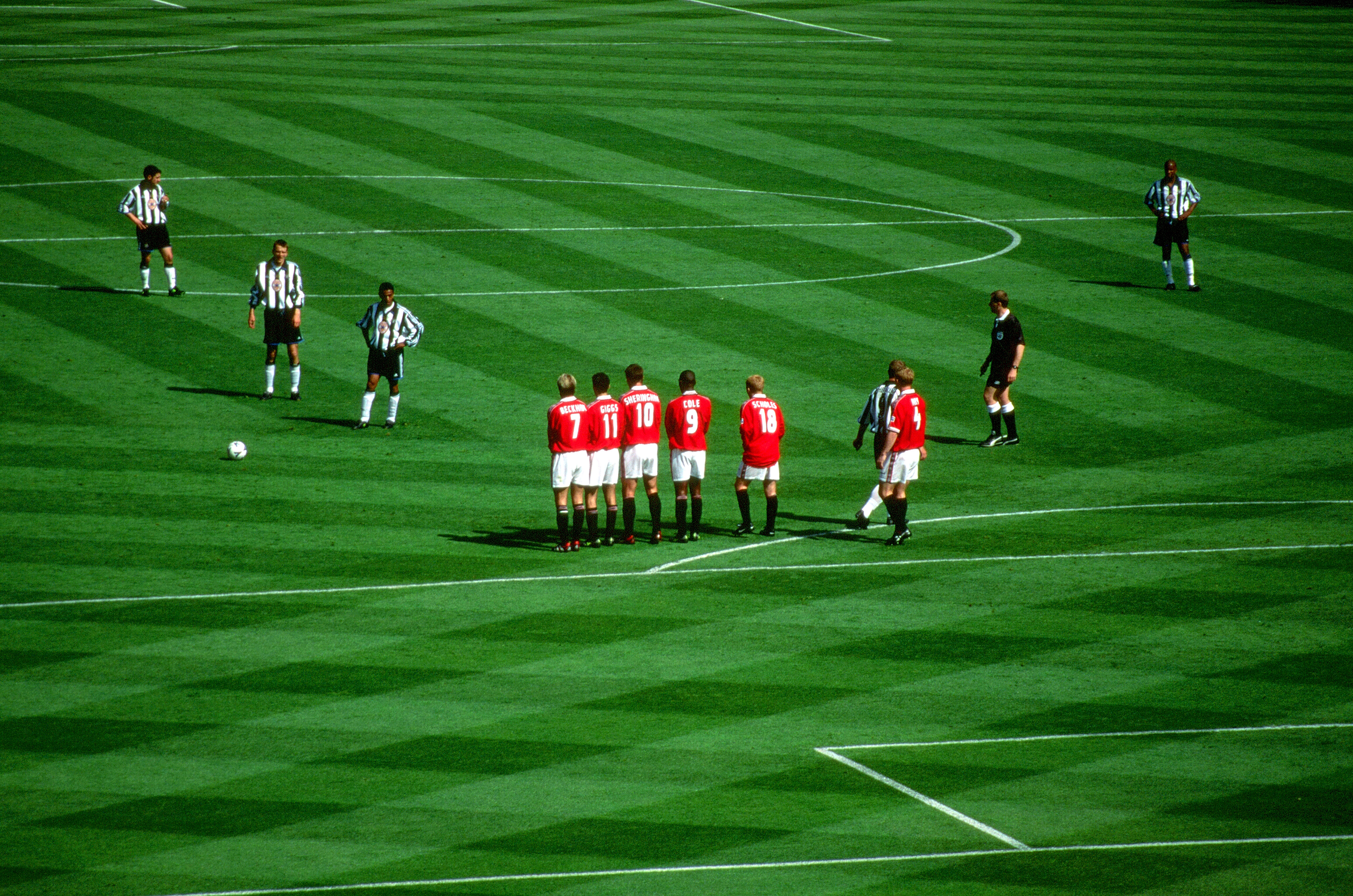
Solano preparing to take a free kick in the 1999 FA Cup final

In June 1998, Solano was close to a £3.75 million transfer to Arsenal with a £16,000 weekly wage. In August, he signed for Newcastle United for £2.5 million, as one of Kenny Dalglish's final signings for the club.

Solano's first team debut for Newcastle came in a Premier League match against Chelsea on 22 August 1998, when he came on after 67 minutes as a substitute for goalscorer Andreas Andersson in a 1–1 away draw. His first of six goals that season equalised in a 3–1 home win over Wimbledon on 28 November, and the last one was the decider in a 4–3 victory at Derby County on 3 April 1999. On 22 May, he started in the 1999 FA Cup final, which his team lost 2–0 to Manchester United at Wembley.

On 2 January 2001, Solano scored the first goal of a 4–2 loss at Tottenham Hotspur, but was sent off nine minutes later for handling the ball on the goal line; Darren Anderton missed the resulting penalty. He was given a red card again on 14 April in a loss at Ipswich Town for the same offence, conceding a penalty from which Marcus Stewart scored the only goal.

In June 2001, he signed a new five-year contract with the club. A month later he scored what he later described as "the best goal of [his] career" with a solo effort against 1860 München. On 22 December, he scored the last-minute winner in a 4–3 comeback win at Leeds United, putting Newcastle in first place at the hosts' expense.

On 26 April 2003, Solano's penalty was the only goal of the Tyne–Wear derby away to Sunderland. He took the spot kick due to Alan Shearer's injury earlier in the game. Six months later in another local derby away to Middlesbrough, he was not named in the starting line-up or on the substitutes' bench, prompting him to drive home.

=== Aston Villa ===
Solano joined Aston Villa in January 2004 for a fee of £1.5 million and signed a two-and-a-half-year contract with the club. He attributed his leaving Newcastle to a "strained relationship" with manager Bobby Robson. He made his debut in a 5–0 win over Leicester City on 31 January, and was sent off on 24 April in a 2–1 win at Middlesbrough for slapping George Boateng.

On 22 September 2004, Solano scored his first goal for Villa from a free kick in a 3–1 home win over Queens Park Rangers in the second round of the Football League Cup, having earlier assisted a goal by Juan Pablo Ángel. A first league goal followed a month later in a 2–0 win against Fulham, also by a free kick at Villa Park. He ended the 2004–05 season as top scorer, and was elected the club's Player of the Year by the supporters, his teammates, and the local press.

In what was Solano's last appearance for Villa, on 23 August 2005, he was sent off for striking Portsmouth's Richard Hughes in the face in a 1–1 draw at Fratton Park. On transfer deadline day, Solano rejected a late offer to join Liverpool and agreed to return to Newcastle.

=== Return to Newcastle United ===
Solano returned to Newcastle United on 31 August 2005 for a fee believed by the BBC to be £1.5 million. He signed a contract originally for two years, but with the option for Newcastle to extend it for another year. Midfielder James Milner went in the other direction, joining Aston Villa on a season-long loan. Solano revealed that Alan Shearer had played an influential role in arranging his return.

The first game of Solano's second spell was a 3–2 home derby win over Sunderland on 23 October. The first goal of the spell, on his 31st birthday on 10 December, decided the game against Arsenal at St James' Park.

In the 2006–07 season, injuries to right-back Stephen Carr and others caused manager Glenn Roeder to play Solano at right-back instead of his usual right-wing position. However it was not an unfamiliar playing position to Solano, as he had started his football career in defence and had featured at right-back for his country. With his contract due to expire at the end of the season, Solano said he would be "crazy" to move on at the age of 32, and duly signed a new one-year contract. However a few months later, he asked to leave the club to be closer to his family, who had moved to London. His one regret was that he had been unable to help the club win a trophy for the fans.

=== West Ham United ===
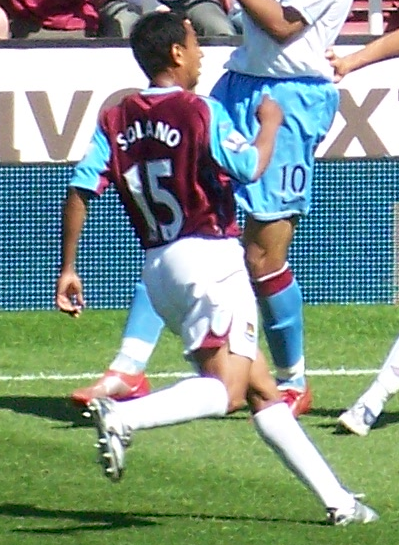
Solano playing for West Ham United

Solano signed a one-year contract with West Ham United in August 2007. He made his debut for West Ham in October 2007, coming on as a second-half substitute in the 3–1 home win against Sunderland, and was instrumental in West Ham's second goal, his shot being deflected into the Sunderland goal by goalkeeper, Craig Gordon. His first goal for West Ham was a free-kick and the fifth goal in West Ham's 5–0 away win against Derby County on 10 November 2007. In the last game of the season on 11 May 2008 Solano scored his second free-kick goal, against Aston Villa, the match ended 2–2. He was released by West Ham when his contract expired at the end of the 2007–08 season having scored four goals in 23 appearances.

=== Larissa and Universitario ===
Although Solano was rumoured to be interesting LA Galaxy, he became "one of the biggest signings in the club's history" when he signed for Super League Greece club AEL in August 2008.

He then returned to Peru with Universitario for its 2009 season, for whom he scored a crucial penalty against Alianza Lima in the play-off for the Peruvian Primera División title, helping the team to a 2–0 aggregate victory to seal the club's 25th league title and win the national championship.

=== Leicester City ===
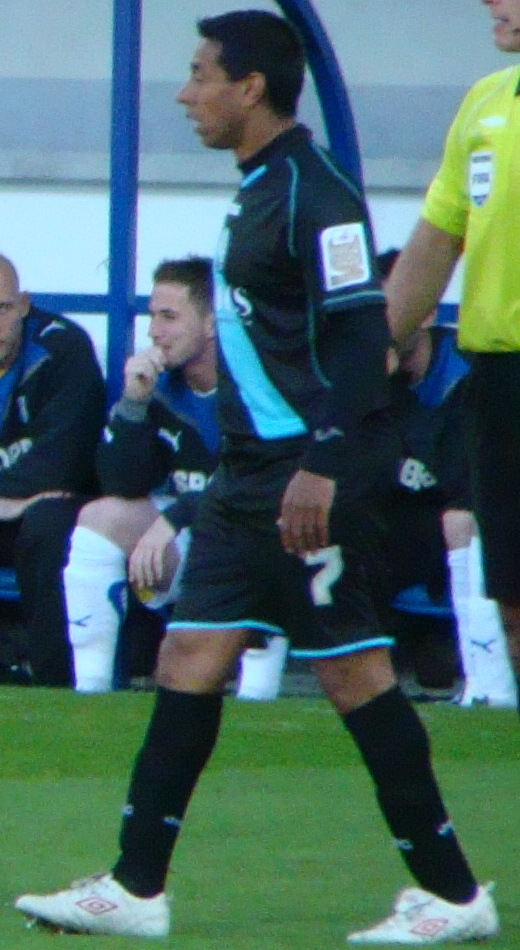
Solano playing for Leicester City

Solano returned to England, where he trained with Colchester United and with Newcastle, before, on 22 January 2010, signing for Leicester City until the end of the season. He was reunited with Nigel Pearson, who had been assistant manager at Newcastle. He made his debut as an 84th-minute substitute in a goalless draw against Newcastle at the Walkers Stadium on 30 January. Solano played eleven league games, scoring in a 4–3 penalty shootout defeat to Cardiff City in the Championship play-off semi-final second leg. He was offered a contract for a further six months, but chose to leave the club, preferring to follow Pearson to Hull City.

=== Hull City ===
Solano rejoined Pearson, who had recently taken over the manager's job at Hull City, signing a one-year deal. Despite initial expectations that Solano would be with Hull City for only a single season before retiring, Solano revealed in April 2011, that he hoped that he would be able to extend his stay with the Tigers beyond the 2010–11 season, by combining a playing and coaching role, as Nick Barmby had done.

=== Hartlepool United ===
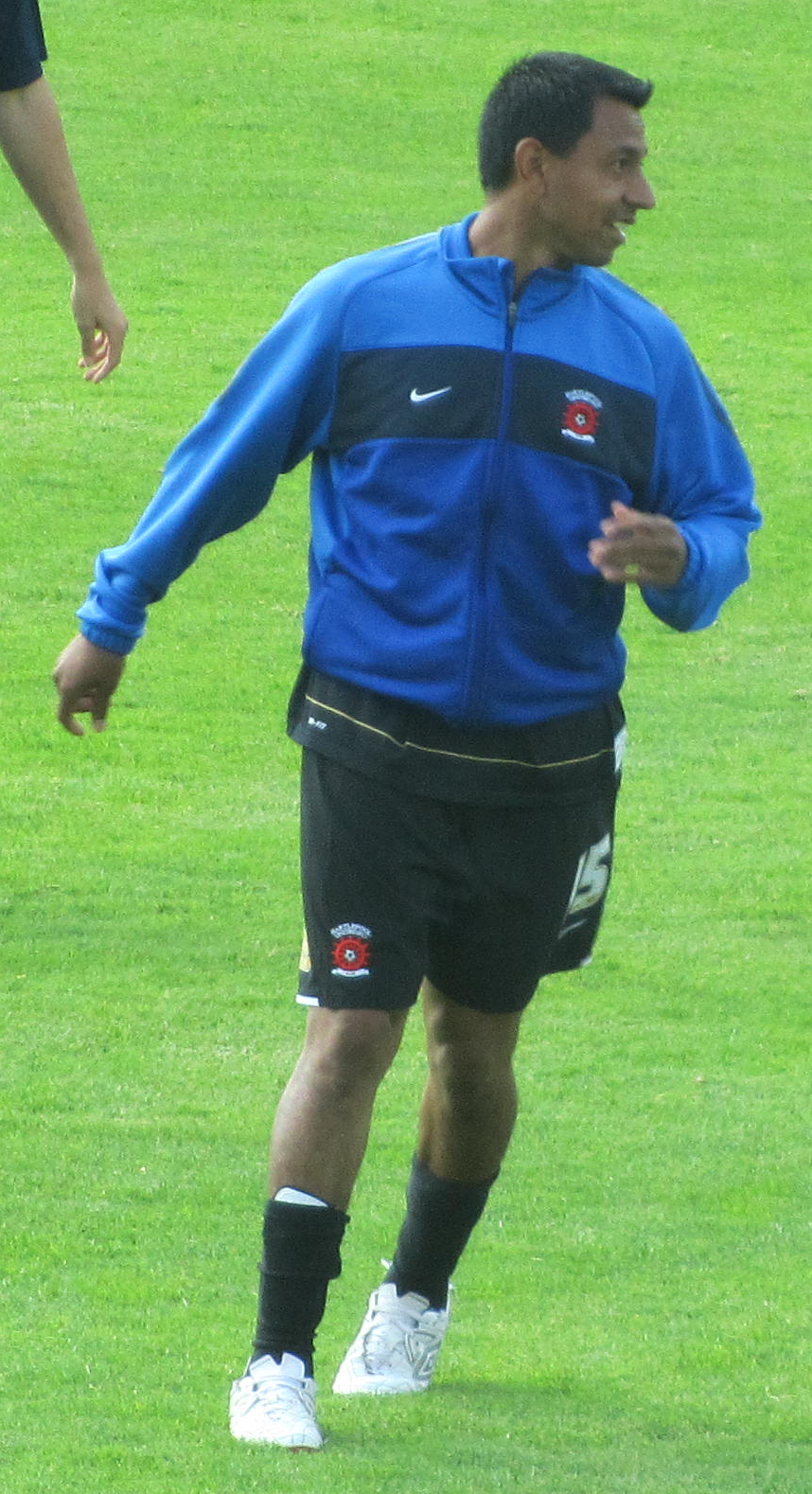
Solano with Hartlepool United in 2011

On 13 May 2011, Solano signed for Hartlepool United, having previously worked with their manager Mick Wadsworth at Newcastle.

On 2 August, Solano scored in a friendly against Sunderland, rivals of his former club Newcastle United, and scored his first league goal for Hartlepool on 17 September at home against Bury. The following week, Solano scored their first goal direct from a free-kick in a 2–1 away win at AFC Bournemouth. Following Wadsworth's sacking, his successor, first-team coach Neale Cooper, confirmed that Solano was not part of his plans, because he needed "players who will really graft, [and] that's not Nobby's game". In April 2012, the club confirmed Solano had been advised not to play for the remainder of the season because of recurring illness.

In February 2012, Solano became first-team coach at Northern League side Newcastle Benfield while remaining a member of Hartlepool's playing squad.

== International career ==
Solano earned 95 caps and scored 20 goals for Peru. His debut on 3 May 1994 was a 1–0 win over neighbours Colombia at the Miami Orange Bowl, and his first goal on 25 June 1995 was the only one of a friendly win over visitors Slovakia. He played at the Copa América in 1995 and 1999, scoring in a 3–3 quarter-final draw with Mexico and the subsequent penalty shootout defeat in the latter, as well as featuring at the 2000 CONCACAF Gold Cup.

At the 2004 Copa América on home soil, Solano scored in group games against Venezuela (win) and Colombia (draw) in a run to the quarter-finals. He said in June 2005 that his international career was over, but returned in September 2007. He announced his international retirement in October 2009 with the team having not qualified for the 2010 FIFA World Cup, and said that he wanted to be a manager so he could finally take Peru to a World Cup.

== Managerial career ==
Solano took the first step into coaching as the part-time first-team coach of Newcastle Benfield in 2012.

In June 2012, he was confirmed as manager of Peruvian Primera División club Universitario. On 12 December, Universitario confirmed that Solano had left the club, despite the fact he guided the club into the top half of the table after being in the relegation zone when he first took charge.

From three months from 23 April 2013, Solano was manager of José Gálvez of the same league. The team slipped from penultimate to last place in his brief spell.

In May 2014, Solano became the head coach of Canadian club Internacional Toronto in League1 Ontario. However, on 22 July, the club had its licensing agreement terminated due to issues regarding the payment of player salaries, ending his tenure.

In May 2015, Solano was hired as a technical assistant to Ricardo Gareca on the Peru national team. He also led the Olympic team. The team qualified for the 2018 FIFA World Cup, their first for 36 years, but after a play-off defeat to Australia on penalties in June 2022 denied them a second consecutive appearance, the entire coaching staff departed.

Solano was hired by AFC Eskilstuna, second-last in the Swedish second-tier Superettan, on 14 July 2023. He was dismissed on 10 October, with the team unmoved in the table.

On 3 May 2024, Solano returned to north–eastern England, when he was appointed as manager of Blyth Spartans on a one-year contract. The team had dismissed Jon Shaw after relegation from the National League North. He would work with Steve Howard, its sporting director. On 27 August 2024, Solano was sacked by Blyth Spartans following a winless start to the campaign in the Northern Premier League with his final game being a 4–1 loss to Morpeth Town. Solano said he was "very disappointed" noting that he had only ten players available to prepare during the pre-season.

On 21 July 2025, Solano was appointed head coach of the Pakistan national under-23 team ahead of the 2026 AFC U-23 Asian Cup qualifiers. He was concurrently appointed as the head coach of the senior team.

== Personal life ==
Solano qualified for a temporary work permit in the United Kingdom when he signed for Newcastle, as he was an international regular for Peru. He later obtained a Greek passport through an ancestor, to bypass the need for a work permit as a citizen of the European Union. In 2001, the police and the Football Association investigated Solano's Greek passport as potentially fake. After a four-year investigation, he was cleared of any wrongdoing.

== Career statistics ==
=== Club ===
Club performance			League		Cup		League Cup		Continental		Total	
Club	Season	League	Apps	Goals	Apps	Goals	Apps	Goals	Apps	Goals	Apps	Goals
Sporting Cristal	1992	Liga 1	4	0	?	?	–		8	0	12	0
Sporting Cristal	1993	Liga 1	11	1	?	?	–		–		11	1
Sporting Cristal	Total		15	1	?	?	–		8	0	23	1
Deportivo Municipal	1993	Liga 1	27	7	?	?	–		–		27	7
Sporting Cristal	1994	Liga 1	35	18	?	?	–		–		35	18
Sporting Cristal	1995	Liga 1	38	12	?	?	–		10	0	48	12
Sporting Cristal	1996	Liga 1	26	13	?	?	–		8	2	34	15
Sporting Cristal	1997	Liga 1	11	7	?	?	–		8	1	19	8
Sporting Cristal	Total		110	50	?	?	–		26	3	136	53
Boca Juniors	1997–98	Argentine Primera División	32	5	?	?	–		?	?	32	5
Newcastle United	1998–99	Premier League	29	6	7	0	1	0	1	0	38	6
Newcastle United	1999–2000	Premier League	30	3	3	0	1	0	6	1	40	4
Newcastle United	2000–01	Premier League	33	6	1	1	4	0	–		38	7
Newcastle United	2001–02	Premier League	37	7	5	1	4	0	6	4	52	12
Newcastle United	2002–03	Premier League	31	7	1	0	1	0	12	1	45	8
Newcastle United	2003–04	Premier League	12	0	2	0	1	0	5	1	20	1
Newcastle United	Total		172	29	19	2	12	0	30	7	233	38
Aston Villa	2003–04	Premier League	10	0	–		–		–		10	0
Aston Villa	2004–05	Premier League	36	8	1	0	2	1	–		39	9
Aston Villa	2005–06	Premier League	3	0	0	0	0	0	–		3	0
Aston Villa	Total		49	8	1	0	2	1	0	0	52	9
Newcastle United	2005–06	Premier League	29	6	4	0	2	0	–		35	6
Newcastle United	2006–07	Premier League	28	2	2	0	3	2	11	0	44	4
Newcastle United	2007–08	Premier League	1	0	0	0	1	0	–		2	0
Newcastle United	Total		58	8	6	0	6	2	11	0	81	10
West Ham United	2007–08	Premier League	23	4	0	0	0	0	–		23	4
AEL	2008–09	Super League Greece	13	1	1	0	–		–		14	1
Universitario	2009	Liga 1	26	8			–		6	2	32	10
Leicester City	2009–10	Championship	13	0	0	0	0	0	–		13	0
Hull City	2010–11	Championship	11	0	1	0	1	0	–		13	0
Hartlepool United	2011–12	League One	14	2	1	0	1	0	–		16	2
Career total			524	105	29	2	22	3	81	12	656	114

=== International ===
Appearances and goals by national team and year
National team	Year	Apps	Goals
Peru	1994	7	0
Peru	1995	6	2
Peru	1996	8	2
Peru	1997	12	1
Peru	1998	2	0
Peru	1999	9	4
Peru	2000	9	1
Peru	2001	5	1
Peru	2003	4	3
Peru	2004	11	6
Peru	2005	4	0
Peru	2007	5	0
Peru	2008	7	0
Peru	2009	6	0
Total		95	20

Scores and results list Peru's goal tally first, score column indicates score after each Solano goal.

List of international goals scored by Nolberto Solano
No.	Date	Venue	Opponent	Score	Result	Competition
1	25 June 1995	Estadio Nacional, Lima, Peru	Slovakia	1–0	1–0	Friendly
2	1 July 1995	Estadio Universidad San Marcos, Lima, Peru	Bolivia	4–1	4–1	Friendly
3	20 June 1996	Estadio Nacional, Lima, Peru	Armenia	4–0	4–0	Friendly
4	16 October 1996	Estadio Nacional, Lima, Peru	United States	4–1	4–1	Friendly
5	19 January 1997	Rose Bowl, Los Angeles, United States	Denmark	1–1	1–2	Friendly
6	17 June 1999	Estadio Palogrande, Manizales, Colombia	Colombia	1–0	3–3	Friendly
7	23 June 1999	Estadio Alejandro Villanueva, Lima, Peru	Venezuela	3–0	3–0	Friendly
8	10 July 1999	Estadio Defensores del Chaco, Asunción, Paraguay	Mexico	3–2	3–3	1999 Copa América
9	17 November 1999	Estadio Nacional, Lima, Peru	Slovakia	2–1	2–1	Friendly
10	29 March 2000	Estadio Nacional, Lima, Peru	Paraguay	1–0	2–0	2002 FIFA World Cup qualification
11	16 August 2001	Estadio El Campín, Bogotá, Colombia	Colombia	1–0	1–0	2002 FIFA World Cup qualification
12	20 August 2003	MetLife Stadium, East Rutherford, United States	Mexico	3–0	3–1	Friendly
13	6 September 2003	Estadio Nacional, Lima, Peru	Paraguay	1–0	4–1	2002 FIFA World Cup qualification
14	16 November 2003	Estadio Monumental, Lima, Peru	Brazil	1–1	1–1	2002 FIFA World Cup qualification
15	18 February 2004	Camp Nou, Barcelona, Spain	Spain	1–0	1–2	Friendly
16	1 June 2004	Estadio Centenario, Montevideo, Uruguay	Uruguay	1–0	3–1	2006 FIFA World Cup qualification
17	30 June 2004	MetLife Stadium, East Rutherford, United States	Argentina	1–1	1–2	Friendly
18	9 July 2004	Estadio Nacional, Lima, Peru	Venezuela	2–0	3–1	2004 Copa América
19	12 July 2004	Estadio Mansiche, Trujillo, Peru	Colombia	1–2	2–2	2004 Copa América
20	13 October 2004	Estadio Defensores del Chaco, Asunción, Paraguay	Paraguay	1–1	1–1	2006 FIFA World Cup qualification

== Managerial statistics ==
As of match played 14 November 2026

Managerial record by team and tenure
Team	Nat.	From	To	Record					Ref.
Team	Nat.	From	To	G	W	D	L	Win %	Ref.
Universitario	(Peru)	1 June 2012	4 December 2012	29	12	9	8	41.38	
José Gálvez	(Peru)	18 April 2013	23 July 2013	16	3	3	10	18.75	
Peru U23	(Peru)	1 January 2019	15 February 2020	4	1	0	3	25.00	
Eskilstuna	(Sweden)	14 July 2023	10 October 2023	14	4	3	7	28.57	
San Marcos	(Peru)	6 September 2024	30 November 2024	4	2	2	0	50.00	
Santos	(Peru)	12 December 2024	23 June 2025	12	5	3	4	41.67	
Pakistan	(Pakistan)	21 July 2025	Present	14	5	3	6	35.71	
Career Total				93	32	23	38	34.41	

== Honours ==
Sporting Cristal

- Peruvian First Division: 1994, 1995, 1996
- Copa Libertadores runner-up: 1997

Newcastle United

- UEFA Intertoto Cup: 2006
- FA Cup runner-up: 1998–99

Universitario de Deportes

- Peruvian First Division: 2009

Peru

- Kirin Cup: 1999, 2005

Individual

- Peruvian Player of the Year: 1992
- America's Ideal Team of the Year: 1997
- South American Player of the Year: 1997 (2nd place)
- Newcastle United Player of the Year: 2001–02
