= Enio Novoa =

Peruvian footballer (born 1986)

Personal information
- Full name: Enio Joao Novoa Heredia
- Date of birth: 3 April 1986 (age 40)
- Place of birth: Lima, Peru
- Height: 1.87 m (6 ft 2 in)
- Position: Midfielder

Team information
- Current team: Unión Comercio
- Number: 6

Senior career*
Years	Team	Apps	(Gls)
2004–2006	Sporting Cristal		
2007–2008	Coronel Bolognesi		
2009	Universitario	11	(0)
2010	FBC Melgar	23	(2)
2011	Sport Huancayo	4	(0)
2011	Hijos Acosvinchos	11	(2)
2012	Sport Huancayo	20	(0)
2013–	Unión Comercio	3	(0)
- * Club domestic league appearances and goals as of 19 April 2013

Enio Joao Novoa Heredia (born 8 April 1986 in Lima) is a Peruvian footballer who plays as a midfielder for club Unión Comercio in the Peruvian First Division.

== Honours ==
=== Club ===
Sporting Cristal

- Peruvian First Division: 2005

Coronel Bolognesi

- Torneo Clausura: 2007

Universitario de Deportes

- Peruvian First Division: 2009
