= Raheem Edwards (soccer, born 1995) =

Canadian soccer player (born 1995)

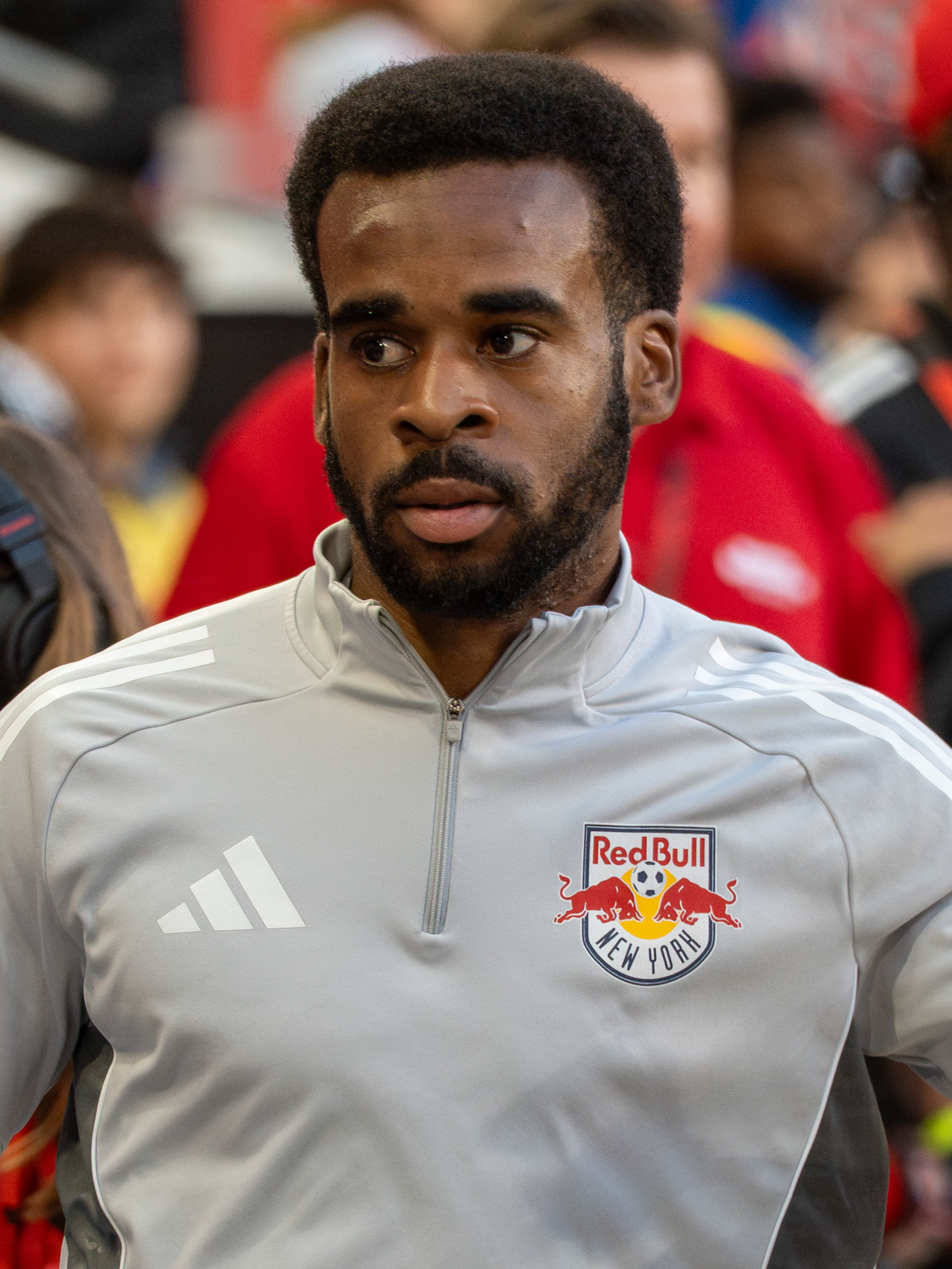
- Edwards with the New York Red Bulls in 2025

Personal information
- Full name: Raheem Nathaniel Anfernee Edwards
- Date of birth: July 17, 1995 (age 31)
- Place of birth: Toronto, Ontario, Canada
- Height: 1.72 m (5 ft 8 in)
- Positions: Midfielder; full-back

Team information
- Current team: Toronto FC
- Number: 44

Youth career
- 2004–2013: Erin Mills SC
- 2014: Toronto FC

College career
| Years | Team | Apps | (Gls) |
| 2014–2015 | Sheridan Bruins | | |

Senior career*
| Years | Team | Apps | (Gls) |
| 2014 | Internacional de Toronto | | |
| 2014 | ANB Futbol | | |
| 2015–2017 | Toronto FC II | 42 | (8) |
| 2016 | → Toronto FC (loan) | 1 | (0) |
| 2017 | Toronto FC | 21 | (1) |
| 2018 | Montreal Impact | 14 | (2) |
| 2018–2019 | Chicago Fire | 17 | (2) |
| 2020 | Minnesota United FC | 12 | (0) |
| 2021 | Los Angeles FC | 27 | (0) |
| 2021 | → Las Vegas Lights (loan) | 1 | (0) |
| 2022–2023 | LA Galaxy | 60 | (3) |
| 2024 | CF Montréal | 25 | (0) |
| 2025 | New York Red Bulls | 24 | (0) |
| 2026– | Toronto FC | 13 | (0) |

International career^{‡}
| 2015–2016 | Canada U23 | 4 | (2) |
| 2017–2022 | Canada | 5 | (0) |
- * Club domestic league appearances and goals as of September 12, 2026 ‡ National team caps and goals as of November 11, 2022

Raheem Nathaniel Anfernee Edwards (born July 17, 1995) is a Canadian professional soccer player who plays as a left winger or wing-back for Toronto FC in Major League Soccer.

== Club career ==
=== Early career ===
Born in Toronto, Edwards began his career with Erin Mills SC before joing the Toronto FC Academy.

In 2014, Edwards joined the new League1 Ontario signing with Internacional de Toronto and then joined ANB Futbol midway through the season after Internacional was expelled from the league.

=== Toronto FC II ===
In 2015, Edwards signed his first professional contract with Toronto FC II, Toronto FC's reserve team. He made his debut as a substitute on March 28 against FC Montreal. Edwards played two full seasons with the USL side, scoring eight goals and assisting on five occasions.

=== Toronto FC ===
In June 2016, Edwards signed a short-term agreement which allowed him to play in cup games with the first team. On June 29, 2016, Edwards made his first team debut during the 2016 Canadian Championship, coming on for Jonathan Osorio in the second half of the second leg of the final. Raheem made his Major League Soccer debut when he entered in the 88th minute TFC's 1–1 draw at home to Seattle Sounders FC on July 2, 2016. In March 2017, Edwards signed a full first team contract with Toronto FC prior to the 2017 season.

=== Montreal Impact ===
On December 12, 2017, Edwards was selected by Los Angeles FC in the 2017 MLS Expansion Draft. He was then immediately traded with fellow expansion draftee Jukka Raitala to Montreal Impact on exchange for defender Laurent Ciman. Edwards would make his Impact debut against Vancouver Whitecaps FC during the 2018 season opener, and would score his first goal for the Impact in the following game against the Columbus Crew.

=== Chicago Fire ===
On July 17, 2018, Edwards was traded to the Chicago Fire in exchange for $400,000 in Targeted Allocation Money. He made his debut four days later on July 21, assisting on a Nemanja Nikolić goal in a 2–1 defeat to his former club Toronto FC.

=== Minnesota United ===
On February 11, 2020, Edwards was again traded within Major League Soccer, this time to Minnesota United FC in exchange for Wyatt Omsberg. He made his debut on March 7 against the San Jose Earthquakes.

=== Los Angeles FC ===
On December 17, 2020, Edwards was selected by Los Angeles FC in the first stage of the 2020 MLS Re-Entry Draft. Upon completion of the 2021 season, Edwards' option for the 2022 season would not be picked up by Los Angeles, making him a free agent.

=== LA Galaxy ===
On January 7, 2022, Edwards signed a three-year deal with LA Galaxy. With this transfer, Edwards became the first LAFC player to join rivals LA Galaxy immediately after a season with LAFC. He made his debut in the Galaxy's season opener against New York City FC on February 27, where he assisted Chicharito's winning goal in a 1–0 victory.

=== CF Montreal ===
In December 2023, Edwards was traded to his former club CF Montréal (previously known as the Montreal Impact), in exchange for $400,000 in general allocation money. Edwards appeared in 25 league matches for Montréal recording 5 assists. At the end of the season, Edwards' contract option would not be exercised, making him a free agent.

=== New York Red Bulls ===
On January 30, 2025, Edwards signed a two-year deal with New York Red Bulls.

== International career ==
=== Youth ===
Born in Canada, Edwards is of Jamaican descent. He made his debut for the Canadian program with the U23 side at the 2015 Pan American Games. He appeared in his first match against Brazil's U23 side as a substitute.

In May 2016, Edwards was called to Canada's U23 national team for a pair of friendlies against Guyana and Grenada. He scored in both games, and received Man of the Match honors with a goal and three assists in the U23's 5–1 victory against Guyana's full national team on May 15, 2016.

=== Senior ===
Edwards made his debut for the Canadian senior team against Curaçao on June 13, 2017. On June 27, he was named to the 2017 CONCACAF Gold Cup squad.

== Career statistics ==
=== Club ===
As of match played September 12, 2026

Appearances and goals by club, season and competition
| Club | Season | League | | | Playoffs | | National cup (Note: Includes Canadian Championship, U.S. Open Cup) | | Other | | Total | |
| Club | Season | Division | Apps | Goals | Apps | Goals | Apps | Goals | Apps | Goals | Apps | Goals |
|---|---|---|---|---|---|---|---|---|---|---|---|---|
| Toronto FC II | 2015 | USL | 21 | 2 | — | | — | | — | | 21 | 2 |
| Toronto FC II | 2016 | USL | 20 | 6 | — | | — | | — | | 20 | 6 |
| Toronto FC II | 2017 | USL | 1 | 0 | — | | — | | — | | 1 | 0 |
| Toronto FC II | Total | | 42 | 8 | 0 | 0 | 0 | 0 | 0 | 0 | 42 | 8 |
| Toronto FC | 2016 | MLS | 1 | 0 | 0 | 0 | 1 | 0 | — | | 2 | 0 |
| Toronto FC | 2017 | MLS | 21 | 1 | 1 | 0 | 3 | 0 | — | | 25 | 1 |
| Toronto FC | Total | | 22 | 1 | 1 | 0 | 4 | 0 | 0 | 0 | 27 | 1 |
| Montreal Impact | 2018 | MLS | 14 | 2 | — | | 0 | 0 | — | | 14 | 2 |
| Chicago Fire | 2018 | MLS | 13 | 1 | — | | 1 | 0 | — | | 14 | 1 |
| Chicago Fire | 2019 | MLS | 4 | 1 | — | | 1 | 0 | — | | 5 | 1 |
| Chicago Fire | Total | | 17 | 2 | 0 | 0 | 2 | 0 | 0 | 0 | 19 | 2 |
| Minnesota United FC | 2020 | MLS | 12 (Note: Includes three appearances in MLS is Back Tournament group stage) | 0 | 0 | 0 | — | | 3 (Note: Appearances in MLS is Back Tournament knockout stage) | 0 | 15 | 0 |
| Los Angeles FC | 2021 | MLS | 27 | 0 | — | | — | | — | | 27 | 0 |
| Las Vegas Lights (loan) | 2021 | USL Championship | 1 | 0 | — | | — | | — | | 1 | 0 |
| LA Galaxy | 2022 | MLS | 30 | 1 | 2 | 0 | 3 | 0 | — | | 35 | 1 |
| LA Galaxy | 2023 | MLS | 30 | 2 | 0 | 0 | 3 | 0 | 2 (Note: Appearance(s) in Leagues Cup) | 0 | 35 | 2 |
| LA Galaxy | Total | | 60 | 3 | 2 | 0 | 6 | 0 | 2 | 0 | 70 | 3 |
| CF Montréal | 2024 | MLS | 25 | 0 | 1 | 0 | 1 | 0 | 1 | 0 | 28 | 0 |
| New York Red Bulls | 2025 | MLS | 24 | 0 | 0 | 0 | 3 | 0 | 2 | 0 | 29 | 0 |
| Toronto FC | 2026 | MLS | 13 | 0 | — | | 1 | 0 | — | | 14 | 0 |
| Career total | | | 257 | 16 | 4 | 0 | 17 | 0 | 8 | 0 | 286 | 16 |

=== International ===
As of match played November 11, 2022

Appearances and goals by national team and year
| National team | Year | Apps | Goals |
|---|---|---|---|
| Canada | 2017 | 3 | 0 |
| Canada | 2018 | 1 | 0 |
| Canada | 2022 | 1 | 0 |
| Total | | 5 | 0 |

== Honours ==
Toronto FC

- MLS Cup: 2017
- Supporters' Shield: 2017
- Canadian Championship: 2016, 2017
