= Edgar Villamarín =

Peruvian footballer (born 1982)

Personal information
- Full name: Edgar Villamarín Arguedas
- Date of birth: April 1, 1982 (age 44)
- Place of birth: Lima, Peru
- Height: 1.84 m (6 ft 0 in)
- Position: Centre back

Senior career*
Years	Team	Apps	(Gls)
2003	Sporting Cristal	0	(0)
2004	Atlético Universidad	15	(0)
2004–2006	Unión Huaral	53	(0)
2007	Cienciano	31	(1)
2008	Chornomorets Odesa	8	(0)
2009	Universitario	22	(1)
2010–2013	Alianza Lima	72	(0)
2014–2017	Melgar	82	(0)
2017	Alianza Atlético	12	(2)
2018–2019	Universidad César Vallejo	42	(0)

International career
2007–2009	Peru	4	(0)
Medal record
Universitario
Winner	Peruvian League	2009
Melgar
Winner	Peruvian League	2015
- * Club domestic league appearances and goals as of 18:58, 6 July 2020 (UTC)

Edgar Villamarín Arguedas (born 1 April 1982) is a Peruvian footballer who plays as a centre back.

== International career ==
Villamarín also featured four times for the Peru national team.

== Honours ==
=== Club ===
Universitario de Deportes

- Torneo Descentralizado: 2009

FBC Melgar

- Torneo Descentralizado: 2015
