= Carlos Orejuela (footballer, born 1980) =

Peruvian footballer

Personal information
- Full name: Carlos Alberto Orejuela Pita
- Date of birth: April 4, 1980 (age 46)
- Place of birth: Barranco, Peru
- Height: 1.78 m (5 ft 10 in)
- Position: Striker

Team information
- Current team: Cienciano
- Number: 41

Youth career
- ????–1996: Alcides Vigo
- 1997–1998: Universitario

Senior career*
Years	Team	Apps	(Gls)
2000–2002	Universitario	23	(2)
2003	Sport Boys	30	(14)
2004	Cienciano	20	(2)
2005	Sporting Cristal	26	(2)
2006	Alianza Lima	23	(3)
2007	Sporting Cristal	36	(7)
2008	César Vallejo	20	(11)
2009	Universitario	24	(5)
2009	Total Chalaco	13	(4)
2010	Universitario	17	(0)
2011	León de Huánuco	16	(2)
2012	Sport Boys	38	(16)
2013	Cienciano	19	(1)
2013–2014	Inti Gas	47	(21)
2015	Cienciano	29	(15)
2016	Real Garcilaso	26	(6)
2016–2017	Ayacucho	44	(15)
2018–2019	César Vallejo	38	(20)
2020	Chavelines Juniors	25	(13)
2021- 2022	Cienciano	1	(0)

International career
2004–2005	Peru	7	(1)
- * Club domestic league appearances and goals as of 19:05, 6 July 2020 (UTC)

Carlos Alberto Orejuela Pita (born 4 April 1980 in Lima), known as Carlos Orejuela, is a Peruvian footballer who plays as a striker for Cienciano in the Peruvian Primera División.

Orejuela made seven appearances for the Peru national football team from 2003 to 2004.

== Honours ==
Universitario de Deportes

- Torneo Descentralizado (2): 2000, 2009
- Apertura: 2002

Sporting Cristal

- Torneo Clausura: 2004

Cienciano

- Torneo Apertura: 2005

Alianza Lima

- Primera División Peruana 2006

Club Deportivo Universidad César Vallejo

- 2018 Peruvian Segunda División
