= Juan Manuel Perillo =

Argentine footballer

Juan Perillo
Personal information
- Full name: Juan Manuel Perillo
- Date of birth: April 9, 1985 (age 41)
- Place of birth: Buenos Aires, Argentina
- Height: 1.79 m (5 ft 10 in)
- Position: Striker

Youth career
- Boca Juniors

Senior career*
| Years | Team | Apps | (Gls) |
| 2004–2006 | Boca Juniors | 0 | (0) |
| 2006 | → Juventud Antoniana (loan) | 16 | (2) |
| 2007 | Once Caldas | 13 | (6) |
| 2007–2008 | Pierikos | ? | (?) |
| 2008–2009 | Universitario de Deportes | 10 | (4) |
- * Club domestic league appearances and goals as of 17 March 2008

Juan Perillo (born April 9, 1985) is an Argentine former footballer.
