= Marcelo Zamora =

Peruvian footballer (born 1987)

Personal information
- Full name: Marcelo José Zamora Gonzales
- Date of birth: January 24, 1987 (age 39)
- Place of birth: Lima, Peru
- Height: 1.78 m (5 ft 10 in)
- Position: Center back

Team information
- Current team: Comerciantes Unidos

Senior career*
Years	Team	Apps	(Gls)
2008	Deportivo Municipal		
2009	La Peña Sporting	3	(0)
2010–2011	Colegio Nacional Iquitos	49	(2)
2012	Cienciano	3	(0)
2013	Colegio Nacional Iquitos		
2014	Hijos de Acosvinchos		
2014	Huracán de Trapiche		
2014	Aurora Chancayllo		
2015	Deportivo Géminis		
2015	Juventud América		
2015–	Comerciantes Unidos	1	(0)
- * Club domestic league appearances and goals as of October 4, 2015

Marcelo José Zamora Gonzales (born January 24, 1987) is a Peruvian footballer who plays as a center back. He currently plays for Comerciantes Unidos in the Torneo Descentralizado.

== Career ==
On January 28, 2010 it was announced that Zamora joined First Division side Colegio Nacional de Iquitos for the start of the new season. Marcelo played his first match in the Peruvian First Division in Round 2 of the 2010 season at home against Sport Boys. The manager César Gonzales allowed Marcelo to start the match along with Jahir Butrón in the center of defence. The match finished 3–1 in favor of the home team, but Zamora was given a yellow card and was substituted by midfielder Juan Pablo Vergara in the 55th minute.
