= Richard Estigarribia =

Paraguayan footballer (born 1982)

Personal information
- Full name: Richard Mariano Estigarribia Ortega
- Date of birth: 15 August 1982 (age 44)
- Place of birth: Itauguá, Paraguay
- Height: 1.82 m (6 ft 0 in)
- Position: Forward

Senior career*
| Years | Team | Apps | (Gls) |
| 2002 | Kyoto Purple Sanga | | |
| 2002–2003 | 12 de Octubre | | |
| 2004 | Cobreloa | | |
| 2005 | 12 de Octubre | | |
| 2006 | Cobresal | | |
| 2006 | 12 de Octubre | | |
| 2007 | Sport Áncash | | |
| 2008 | César Vallejo | | |
| 2008 | José Gálvez | | |
| 2009 | Total Chalaco | 40 | (23) |
| 2010–2012 | José Terán | 72 | (19) |
| 2012 | Inti Gas | 9 | (0) |
| 2013 | Aucas | ? | (2) |
| 2013–2014 | 12 de Octubre | | |
| 2014–2015 | Oriente Petrolero | 19 | (5) |
| 2015 | San Lorenzo | 15 | (2) |
| 2016–2017 | Cienciano | | |
| 2018 | Martín Ledesma | | |
- * Club domestic league appearances and goals

Richard Estigarribia (born 15 August 1982) is a Paraguayan footballer.

== Honours ==
=== Club ===
Cobreloa

- Primera División de Chile (1): 2004 Clausura
