= Junior Nuñez =

Peruvian footballer (born 1989)

Personal information
- Full name: José Luis Junior Nuñez Julca
- Date of birth: 28 July 1989 (age 37)
- Place of birth: Barranca, Peru
- Height: 1.72 m (5 ft 8 in)
- Position: Midfielder

Team information
- Current team: Cienciano
- Number: 17

Youth career
- Sport Boys

Senior career*
Years	Team	Apps	(Gls)
2008–2011	Sport Boys	59	(3)
2009	→ Universitario (loan)	1	(0)
2012–	Cienciano	26	(1)
- * Club domestic league appearances and goals as of 22 April 2013

José Luis Junior Nuñez Julca (born 28 July 1989 in Barranca) is a Peruvian football defensive midfielder, currently playing for Cienciano.

== Career ==
When he started, he played as offensive midfielder, then in Sport Boys he started to play as defensive midfielder. In 2008, he was promoted to the first team by Jacinto Rodriguez. In 2009, he signed with Universitario de Deportes, but he was loaned because he didn't have opportunities.
