= Víctor Píriz =

Uruguayan footballer (born 1980)

Víctor Piríz Alves
Personal information
- Full name: Víctor Enrique Piríz Alves
- Date of birth: 22 June 1980 (age 46)
- Place of birth: Artigas, Uruguay
- Height: 1.81 m (5 ft 11 in)
- Position: Forward

Senior career*
Years	Team	Apps	(Gls)
2002–2003	Tacuarembó	8	(1)
2003–2004	Talleres	31	(10)
2004	Argentinos Juniors	17	(3)
2005	Banfield	11	(1)
2005–2006	Arsenal de Sarandí	24	(3)
2006–2007	Talleres	27	(3)
2007–2008	San Luis	33	(15)
2009	Necaxa	2	(0)
2009–2010	Tijuana	13	(2)
2010	Universitario de Deportes	23	(6)
2011–2012	Defensa y Justicia	54	(26)
2012–2013	Independiente Rivadavia	33	(5)
2013–2014	Atlético Tucumán	26	(3)
2014	Guillermo Brown	14	(5)
2015–2016	Barracas Central	55	(5)
2017	Tacuarembó	16	(0)
2018–2019	Deportivo Armenio	24	(3)
- * Club domestic league appearances and goals as of 16:01, 7 January 2020 (UTC)

Víctor Enrique Piríz Alves (born 22 June 1980 in Artigas, Uruguay) is a Uruguayan football player who plays as a forward.

== Career ==
He debuted in the Uruguayan Primera División playing for Tacuarembó, where he played from 2002 to 2003. In that year he was transferred to Talleres de Córdoba in Argentina, where he had his best interests . With the Cordoba club was ranked 3rd in the Clausura 2004. Promoting played against Argentinos Juniors to validate the category but failed.

In 2004, Alves became Píriz Argentinos Juniors, computer that did not have good performances. In 2005, he played for Banfield, also Argentinos Juniors, and was its presentation in an international tournament as the Copa Libertadores. Ended the cup had a stint by Arsenal de Sarandí to then saturate again in Talleres de Córdoba, this time playing on the First "B" national. When finished that season ended up in the Club San Luis Mexican championship. He went to Club Necaxa and the Draft League Ascent 2009 he moved to Club Tijuana. In January 2010 he was hired by the club Universitario de Deportes of Peru, where he served in a low yield until the end of the 2010 season.

The 2011–2012 season was very prominent in Defensa y Justicia, being the main scorer and scoring key goals, as a River Plate, Instituto, Quilmes, Rosario Central.

In 2012 by the club record Independiente Rivadavia.

In 2013 signed to Atlético Tucumán becoming his first goal against rival classic, San Martin de Tucuman in the match which ended 3–1 in favor of the Decanos.El February 22, 2014 ahead and scored his first official goal with the blue and white when he played extra time in the tie against Ferro. Would mark his third goal (the second officer) in the 3–1 victory on the road against one of the big five of Argentina, Independiente de Avellaneda

== Honours ==
=== Club ===
Tijuana

- Liga de Ascenso Mexico: 2010–11
