= Salvador Capitano =

Argentinean former soccer player

Personal information
- Full name: Salvador Capitano
- Date of birth: 1 January 1955 (age 71)
- Place of birth: Rosario, Argentina
- Position: Defender

Senior career*
Years	Team	Apps	(Gls)
1962–1975	Newell's Old Boys		
1976	Central Córdoba	7	(0)
1977	Palermo		
1978–1983	Renato Cesarini		

Managerial career
- 1984–1987: Newell's Old Boys (assistant)
- 1988–1990: Independiente (assistant)
- 1991–1992: Tenerife (assistant)
- 1992–1994: Emelec
- 1994: Saudi Arabia (scout)
- 1995–1996: Barcelona SC
- 1997: América (assistant)
- 1998: Aldosivi
- 1999: Unión Santa Fe
- 2001: Junior
- 2002: Barcelona SC
- 2002: Jaguares
- 2003: Emelec
- 2005: Barcelona SC
- 2007: Universidad de Chile
- 2007: Talleres
- 2009: Montevideo Wanderers
- 2010: Universitario
- 2011–2012: Sarmiento Resistencia
- * Club domestic league appearances and goals

Salvador Capitano (born 1 January 1955 in Rosario) is an Argentinean former football player. He is currently a coach.

== Honours ==
Coach

Emelec

- Torneo Apertura- 1992
- Copa Saeta Internacional- 1992
- Torneo Apertura- 1993
- Serie A- 1993
- Copa del Pacifico- 1993

Barcelona SC

- Torneo Apertura- 1995
- Serie A- 1995
- Torneo Apertura- 2002
