= Johan Vásquez (footballer, born 1984) =

Peruvian footballer

Personal information
- Full name: Jorge Johan Vásquez Rosales
- Date of birth: 8 October 1984 (age 42)
- Place of birth: Lima, Peru
- Height: 1.79 m (5 ft 10 in)
- Position: Central midfielder

Senior career*
Years	Team	Apps	(Gls)
2003–2008	Coronel Bolognesi	154	(15)
2008–2011	Universitario de Deportes	94	(5)
2012	León de Huánuco	35	(1)
2013	Cienciano	28	(1)
2014	Melgar	18	(1)

International career
2008	Peru	1	(0)
- * Club domestic league appearances and goals

Jorge Johan Vásquez Rosales (born 8 October 1984) is a Peruvian former professional footballer who played as a central midfielder.

== Club career ==
Vásquez was born in Lima, Peru. In January 2012, he had his contract with Universitario de Deportes rescinded by the Peruvian Football Federation due to seven months of unpaid wages. He joined León de Huánuco for the start of the 2012 Torneo Descentralizado season.

== Honours ==
Coronel Bolognesi

- Torneo Clausura: 2007

Universitario de Deportes

- Torneo Descentralizado: 2009
