= Luis Ramírez (footballer, born 1984) =

Peruvian footballer

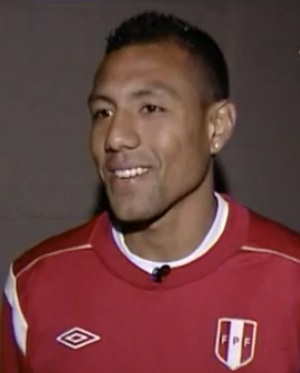
- Ramírez with the Peru national team

Personal information
- Full name: Luis Alberto Ramírez Lucay
- Date of birth: 10 November 1984 (age 42)
- Place of birth: Lima, Peru
- Height: 1.80 m (5 ft 11 in)
- Position: Midfielder

Team information
- Current team: Academia Cantolao
- Number: 8

Youth career
- 1997–2001: Cantolao
- 2002: Coronel Bolognesi

Senior career*
Years	Team	Apps	(Gls)
2003–2005	Coronel Bolognesi	75	(8)
2006	Cienciano	14	(1)
2006–2009	Coronel Bolognesi	71	(19)
2008	→ Universitario (loan)	19	(1)
2009	→ Libertad (loan)	13	(4)
2010	Universitario	37	(5)
2011–2014	Corinthians	17	(1)
2013	→ Ponte Preta (loan)	10	(0)
2014	→ Botafogo (loan)	16	(1)
2015	Universidad San Martín	11	(1)
2016–2019	Alianza Lima	138	(14)
2020–2022	Sport Boys	72	(7)
2023–	Academia Cantolao	25	(1)

International career
2005–2014	Peru	33	(2)
- * Club domestic league appearances and goals as of 18:51, 3 May 2020 (UTC)

Luis Alberto Ramírez Lucay (born 10 November 1984) is a Peruvian professionaö footballer who plays as a midfielder for Academia Cantolao.

== Career statistics ==
=== Club ===
Appearances and goals by club, season and competition
Club	Season	League			National cup (Note: Includes Copa Federación, Copa do Brasil.)		Continental		Other		Total	
Club	Season	Division	Apps	Goals	Apps	Goals	Apps	Goals	Apps	Goals	Apps	Goals
Libertad	2009	Paraguayan Primera División	12	3	–		7 (Note: Appearances in Copa Libertadores)	1	0	0	19	4
Universitario	2010	Peruvian Primera División	0	0	0	0	6	1	0	0	6	1
Corinthians	2011	Série A	6	1	0	0	1	0	18 (Note: Appearances in Campeonato Paulista)	2	25	4
Corinthians	2012	Série A	9	0	0	0	1	0	13	2	23	3
Corinthians	2014	Série A	0	0	0	0	0	0	4	0	4	0
Ponte Preta (loan)	2013	Série A	10	0	1	0	1 (Note: Appearance in Copa Sudamericana)	0	16	2	28	2
Career total			37	4	1	0	16	2	50	6	104	14

=== International ===
Scores and results list Peru's goal tally first, score column indicates score after each Ramírez goal.

List of international goals scored by Luis Ramírez
No.	Date	Venue	Opponent	Score	Result	Competition
1	8 October 2010	Estadio Alejandro Villanueva, Lima, Peru	Costa Rica		2–0	Friendly
2	17 November 2010	Estadio El Campín, Bogotá, Colombia	Colombia		1–1	Friendly

== Honours ==
Bolognesi

- Torneo Clausura: 2007

Corinthians

- Campeonato Brasileiro Série A: 2011
- Copa Libertadores: 2012

Ponte Preta

- Campeonato Paulista do Interior: 2013

Alianza Lima

- Torneo Apertura: 2017
- Peruvian First Division: 2017
