= Joyce Conde =

Peruvian footballer (born 1991)

Personal information
- Full name: Joyce Leopoldo Conde Chigne
- Date of birth: 8 September 1991 (age 35)
- Place of birth: Cajamarca, Peru
- Height: 1.90 m (6 ft 3 in)
- Position: Center forward

Youth career
- –2008: Universitario de Deportes

Senior career*
Years	Team	Apps	(Gls)
2009–2011	Universitario	15	(0)
2012	Universidad César Vallejo	2	(0)
- * Club domestic league appearances and goals as of 19 April 2013

Joyce Leopoldo Conde Chigne (born 8 September 1991 in Cajamarca, Peru) is a Peruvian footballer who plays as a center forward.

== Club career ==
In 2008 Conde played for the U-20 Universitario de Deportes squad. In 2009, he was promoted to the first team and made his debut on 9 May 2009 at home against Sport Huancayo, which Universitario de Deportes won 4-1.
