= Gianfranco Labarthe =

Peruvian footballer (born 1984)

Personal information
- Full name: Gianfranco Alberto Labarthe Tomé
- Date of birth: September 20, 1984 (age 42)
- Place of birth: Lima, Peru
- Height: 1.78 m (5 ft 10 in)
- Position: Striker

Youth career
- Cantolao
- Sport Boys

Senior career*
Years	Team	Apps	(Gls)
2003	Huddersfield Town	3	(0)
2003–2004	Derby County	3	(0)
2005	Coronel Bolognesi	30	(2)
2006–2007	Sport Boys	45	(9)
2008–2010	Universitario de Deportes	84	(24)
2011–2012	Universidad San Martín	29	(2)
2012	→ Apollon Limassol (loan)	6	(0)
2013–2014	UT Cajamarca	78	(17)
2015–2016	Deportivo Municipal	20	(4)
2016	Real Garcilaso	13	(1)
2016–2017	Sport Huancayo	6	(0)
2017	Sport Boys	17	(1)
2018–2019	Cantolao	37	(9)
2020	Deportivo Coopsol	7	(1)
- * Club domestic league appearances and goals as of 19:11, 9 August 2021 (UTC)

Gianfranco Alberto Labarthe Tomé (born 20 September 1984 in Lima) is a Peruvian footballer who plays as a striker.

== Career ==
He played briefly for English Football League clubs Huddersfield Town and Derby County. He also had a trial at Shrewsbury Town. He then moved back to Peru where he played for Sport Boys for three seasons before signing with Universitario.

On 9 May 2015, he scored his first goal with Deportivo Municipal, an impressive right-footed volley against Universidad San Martín de Porres.

On 30 June 2024, he declared his love for Huddersfield Town and mentioned that he "always hated Leeds and Bradford."

== Honours ==
=== Club ===
Universitario de Deportes

- Torneo Apertura: 2008
- Torneo Descentralizado: 2009

Sport Boys

- 2017 Peruvian Segunda División

Peru U18

- Bolivarian Games: 2001
