= 2009 Torneo Descentralizado =

Torneo Descentralizado
- Season: 2009
- Dates: 14 February 2009 – 13 December 2009
- Champions: Universitario de Deportes; 15th Descentralizado title 18th professional title 25th Primera División
- Relegated: Coronel Bolognesi; Sport Áncash
- Copa Libertadores: Universitario; Alianza Lima; Juan Aurich
- Copa Sudamericana: Sport Huancayo; Universidad San Martín; Universidad César Vallejo
- Matches: 354
- Goals: 885 (2.5 per match)
- Top goalscorer: Richard Estigarribia (23 goals)
- Biggest home win: Sport Huancayo 7-0 Coronel Bolognesi
- Biggest away win: Sport Áncash 0-5 Sporting Cristal
- Highest scoring: Cienciano 5-5 Sporting Cristal

The 2009 Torneo Descentralizado de Fútbol Profesional (known as the Copa Cable Mágico for sponsorship reasons) was the 93rd season of Association Peruvian football. A total of 16 teams competed in the tournament. The season began on February 14 and concluded on December 13 with the victory of Universitario de Deportes over Alianza Lima in the second leg of the final Play-off, giving Universitario its twenty-fifth Peruvian title.

== Competitions modus ==
The season was divided into 3 stages. In the first stage the 16 teams played a round-robin home-and-away round for a total of 30 matches each. In the second stage the 16 teams were divided into 2 groups. The 8 teams that ranked an odd number played in the group Liguilla A and the 8 teams that ranked an even number played in Liguilla B. Each team carried on their records from the first stage. Each group played another round-robin home-and-away round for 14 matches played by each team. The teams ranked first in each group at the end of the 14 matches advanced to the third stage. The two teams with the worst fewest points at the end of the second stage were relegated. In the third stage the championship was contested in a two-legged Play-off. The Play-off finalists qualified for the Copa Libertadores. The remaining international competition berths were determined by the season aggregate table.

== Changes from 2008 ==
=== Structural changes ===
- Two teams were added to the first division to make 16 teams in the first division from 14 in 2008.
- The Apertura and Clausura tournament format was not used after the addition of the two teams to the first division.
- Peru was given a third berth for the 2010 Copa Sudamericana.
- In the Play-off finals, goal difference was removed as a tiebreaking criterion. A tie in points meant a third match at a neutral ground.

=== Promotion and relegation ===
Atlético Minero and Sport Boys finished the 2008 season in 13th and 14th place, respectively, in the aggregate table and thus were relegated to the Segunda División. They were replaced by the champion and runner-up teams of the 2008 Segunda División, Total Clean and Inti Gas and champion and runner-up teams of the 2008 Copa Perú, Sport Huancayo and CNI

=== Team changes ===
Promoted from 2008 Segunda División	Promoted from 2008 Copa Perú	Relegated from 2008 Primera División
▲ Total Clean (1st) ▲ Inti Gas (2nd)	▲ Sport Huancayo (1st) ▲CNI (2nd)	▼ Atlético Minero (13th) ▼ Sport Boys (14th)

== Teams ==
A total of 16 teams competed in this season. The only teams to have ownership over their home ground is Alianza Lima and Universitario. The other 14 clubs rent their home grounds from the Instituto Peruano del Deporte or their local municipality.

Locations of the 2009 Primera División teams

Team	City	Stadium	Capacity
Alianza Atlético	Sullana	Campeones del 36	8,000
Alianza Lima	Lima	Alejandro Villanueva	35,000
Cienciano	Cusco	Garcilaso	42,056
CNI	Iquitos	Max Augustín	24,000
Coronel Bolognesi	Tacna	Jorge Basadre	19,850
Inti Gas	Ayacucho	Ciudad de Cumaná	15,000
José Gálvez	Chimbote	Manuel Rivera Sánchez	25,000
Juan Aurich	Chiclayo	Elías Aguirre	24,500
Melgar	Arequipa	Virgen de Chapi	40,000
Sport Áncash	Huaraz	Gerardo Lara Guerrero	8,000
Sport Huancayo	Huancayo	Huancayo	20,000
Sporting Cristal	Lima	San Martín de Porres	18,000
Total Chalaco	Callao	Miguel Grau	17,000
Universidad César Vallejo	Trujillo	Mansiche	25,000
Universidad San Martín	Lima	San Martín de Porres	18,000
Universitario	Lima	Monumental	80,093

== First stage ==
=== Standings ===
Pos	Team	Pld	W	D	L	GF	GA	GD	Pts	Second Stage placement
1	Juan Aurich	30	15	10	5	46	31	+15	55	Liguilla A
2	Universitario	30	15	9	6	37	22	+15	54	Liguilla B
3	Alianza Lima	30	15	6	9	37	30	+7	51	Liguilla A
4	Sport Huancayo	30	14	6	10	48	30	+18	48	Liguilla B
5	Universidad César Vallejo	30	13	9	8	41	33	+8	48	Liguilla A
6	Universidad San Martín	30	12	11	7	45	34	+11	47 (Note: U. San Martin was docked three points the first round for fielding four foreign players. The points from the 3–0 loss were not awarded to the opposing team.)	Liguilla B
7	Sporting Cristal	30	12	6	12	53	36	+17	42	Liguilla A
8	Cienciano	30	10	12	8	41	38	+3	42	Liguilla B
9	Inti Gas	30	11	8	11	36	31	+5	41	Liguilla A
10	Melgar	30	11	8	11	36	41	−5	41	Liguilla B
11	José Gálvez	30	11	6	13	28	37	−9	39	Liguilla A
12	Total Chalaco	30	9	10	11	40	39	+1	37	Liguilla B
13	CNI	30	9	4	17	24	39	−15	31	Liguilla A
14	Alianza Atlético	30	7	9	14	28	41	−13	30	Liguilla B
15	Sport Áncash	30	7	6	17	26	50	−24	27	Liguilla A
16	Coronel Bolognesi	30	3	11	16	25	58	−33	20	Liguilla B

Updated to match(es) played on September 2, 2009. Source: RSSSF
Rules for classification: 1) points; 2) goal difference; 3) number of goals scored.

=== Results ===
Home \ Away	AAS	ALI	CIE	CNI	BOL	MEL	IGD	JG	JA	ÁNC	CRI	SHU	TCH	UCV	USM	UNI
Alianza Atlético		1–0	1–1	0–0	2–0	1–1	1–3	2–1	0–0	2–0	0–2	3–1	3–0	1–2	0–0	1–2
Alianza Lima	0–0		2–0	4–0	1–0	0–2	2–1	1–3	1–1	1–0	2–1	2–1	2–2	1–1	0–1	0–1
Cienciano	3–0	0–2		2–1	0–0	2–1	3–0	1–0	5–1	0–0	5–5	0–3	2–2	1–1	1–1	1–1
CNI	0–1	1–2	1–3		2–0	1–0	1–0	0–1	0–1	2–0	0–0	2–0	1–0	2–0	0–2	1–0
Coronel Bolognesi	2–1 (Note: Played in Estadio Heroes del Alto de la Alianza.)	1–2	0–0	2–3		3–2	2–3	1–0	1–1	0–1	2–2	0–0	1–4	2–2	1–4	0–0
Melgar	2–1	0–1	2–2	2–1	2–1		0–2 (Note: Played in Estadio Municipal La Tomilla.)	1–0	1–3 (Note: Played in Estadio Mariano Melgar.)	3–1	1–0	1–0	1–0	1–1	1–0	0–0
Inti Gas	2–0	3–0	0–1	2–0	1–1	1–1		1–0	0–0	1–1	3–1	2–3	0–0	2–0	1–1	1–0
José Gálvez	2–1	1–3	1–1	2–1	1–0	1–1	1–0		1–1	3–1	2–1	1–1	2–1	1–0	0–2	0–1
Juan Aurich	3–2	1–2	1–1	4–1	2–0	2–2	1–0	3–0		3–2	2–1	3–1	2–0	3–0	1–0	2–0
Sport Áncash	1–0	2–1	2–1	1–0	2–2	2–2	2–0	1–2	0–0		0–5	1–2	0–2	0–1	1–1	1–2
Sporting Cristal	5–0	0–1 (Note: Played in Estadio Miguel Grau.)	0–2	2–0	5–0	1–2	2–2	2–0	1–0	2–0		3–1	0–1	1–0	3–4	1–1
Sport Huancayo	3–0	2–0	2–0	3–1	7–0	2–0	1–0	1–0	2–0	3–0	0–2		0–0	3–2	1–1	0–0
Total Chalaco	1–1	2–2	4–0	2–1	2–2	3–2	1–1	4–0	0–0	1–2	1–3	1–0		2–3 (Note: Played in Estadio San Martín de Porres.)	4–2	1–1
Universidad César Vallejo	0–0	0–1	0–1	1–1	3–0	5–1	2–1	2–0	3–3	1–0	1–0	2–1	1–0		1–1	3–1
Universidad San Martín	3–2	1–1	2–1	0–0	3–1	3–1	1–2	1–1	4–1	2–1	2–2	1–1	2–0	1–1 (Note: Match was ruled 3-0 loss for San Martín but remained 1-1 draw for César Vallejo.)		0–1
Universitario	1–1	2–1	2–1	2–0	0–0	1–0	2–1	1–1	0–1	5–1	1–0	4–1	3–0	1–2	1–0	

Updated to match(es) played on 28 March 2010. Source: RSSSF
Legend: Blue = home team win; Yellow = draw; Red = away team win.

== Second stage ==
The Second Stage began September 13. The winner of each Liguilla qualified for the 2010 Copa Libertadores group stage and advanced to the third stage of the Torneo Descentralizado.

=== Liguilla A ===
==== Standings ====
Pos	Team	Pld	W	D	L	GF	GA	GD	Pts	Qualification
1	Alianza Lima	44	22	10	12	58	45	+13	76	Third Stage and the 2010 Copa Libertadores Second Stage
2	Juan Aurich	44	20	14	10	61	44	+17	74	
3	Universidad César Vallejo	44	17	16	11	59	51	+8	67	
4	Inti Gas	44	18	10	16	58	51	+7	64	
5	Sporting Cristal	44	16	9	19	71	55	+16	57	
6	José Gálvez	44	15	7	22	43	59	−16	52	
7	CNI	44	14	8	22	39	59	−20	50	
8	Sport Áncash	44	13	9	22	39	61	−22	48	

Updated to match(es) played on December 6, 2009. Source: RSSSF
Rules for classification: 1) points; 2) goal difference; 3) number of goals scored.

==== Results ====
Home \ Away	ALI	CNI	IGD	JG	JA	ÁNC	CRI	UCV
Alianza Lima		2–1	3–1	1–1	1–0	1–0	1–0	2–2
CNI	0–3		1–1	2–1	1–0	1–0	3–1	1–1
Inti Gas	3–2	2–1		2–1	2–2	1–0	2–0	2–1
José Gálvez	0–1	1–3	0–3		3–1	1–0	3–1	0–1
Juan Aurich	2–1	3–0	2–0	1–2		1–1	0–0	2–1
Sport Áncash	2–0	0–0	2–1	1–0	1–0		1–0	4–0
Sporting Cristal	1–1	4–0	2–1	3–2	0–1	4–0		1–3
Universidad César Vallejo	2–2	1–1	3–1	2–0	0–0	1–1	1–1	

Updated to match(es) played on December 6, 2009. Source: RSSSF
Legend: Blue = home team win; Yellow = draw; Red = away team win.

=== Liguilla B ===
==== Standings ====
Pos	Team	Pld	W	D	L	GF	GA	GD	Pts	Qualification
1	Universitario	44	23	12	9	59	32	+27	81	Third Stage and the 2010 Copa Libertadores Second Stage
2	Sport Huancayo	44	21	7	16	65	55	+10	70	
3	Universidad San Martín	44	18	15	11	64	48	+16	69 (Note: U. San Martin lost points won in the first round for fielding four foreign players. The game was a 3-0 loss. These points were not awarded to the opposing team.)	
4	Melgar	44	15	13	16	59	62	−3	58	
5	Cienciano	44	14	16	14	58	63	−5	58	
6	Total Chalaco	44	12	15	17	61	62	−1	51	
7	Alianza Atlético	44	12	13	19	44	58	−14	49	
8	Coronel Bolognesi	44	7	15	22	42	76	−34	36	

Updated to match(es) played on December 6, 2009. Source: RSSSF
Rules for classification: 1) points; 2) goal difference; 3) number of goals scored.

==== Results ====
Home \ Away	AAS	CIE	BOL	MEL	SHU	TCH	USM	UNI
Alianza Atlético		2–0	2–2	4–1	2–1	1–2	2–1	0–1
Cienciano	1–0		2–0	1–4	3–0	4–1	1–1	1–1
Coronel Bolognesi	2–0	2–2 (Note: Played in Heroes del Alto de la Alianza.)		1–0	2–0	2–2	1–2	0–1
Melgar	1–1	0–0	2–1		3–1	1–1	0–1	5–0
Sport Huancayo	0–0	3–2	2–1	3–1		2–0	1–0	1–0
Total Chalaco	0–0 (Note: Played in Estadio Municipal Facundo Ramirez.)	4–0	1–2	2–2	5–1		2–2	0–3
Universidad San Martín	0–2	5–0	2–1	2–2	1–2	1–0		1–0
Universitario	4–0	2–0	0–0	3–1	5–0	2–1	0–0	

Updated to match(es) played on December 6, 2009. Source: RSSSF
Legend: Blue = home team win; Yellow = draw; Red = away team win.

== Third stage ==
The Third Stage was the finals (also known as the Play-off) of the 2009 season between the winners of each group of the Second Stage. They were played on December 8 and 13. The group winner with the most points on the aggregate table chose the home ground order.

December 8, 2009
16:00 UTC-5

Alianza Lima	0 – 1	Universitario
	Report	Alva 29'

Estadio Alejandro Villanueva, Lima
Attendance: 32,441
Referee: Víctor Hugo Rivera

December 13, 2009
15:30 UTC-5

Universitario	1 – 0	Alianza Lima
Solano 9' (pen.)	Report

Estadio Monumental, Lima
Attendance: 42,076
Referee: Víctor Hugo Carrillo

== Aggregate table ==
The aggregate table determined the third Peruvian berth for the 2010 Copa Libertadores, the three berths for the 2010 Copa Sudamericana, and the relegation to the Segunda División. The aggregate table consists of the points earned in the First and Second stages.

Pos	Team	Pld	W	D	L	GF	GA	GD	Pts	Qualification or relegation
1	Universitario (C)	44	23	12	9	59	32	+27	81	2010 Copa Libertadores Second Stage
2	Alianza Lima	44	22	10	12	58	45	+13	76	2010 Copa Libertadores Second Stage
3	Juan Aurich	44	20	14	10	61	44	+17	74	2010 Copa Libertadores First Stage
4	Sport Huancayo	44	21	7	16	65	55	+10	70	2010 Copa Sudamericana Second Stage
5	Universidad San Martín	44	18	15	11	64	48	+16	69 (Note: U. San Martin was docked three points after the first round of the first stage for fielding four foreign players. The points from the 3–0 loss were not awarded to the opposing team.)	2010 Copa Sudamericana First Stage
6	Universidad César Vallejo	44	17	16	11	60	51	+9	67	2010 Copa Sudamericana First Stage
7	Inti Gas	44	18	10	16	58	51	+7	64	
8	Melgar	44	15	13	16	59	62	−3	58	
9	Cienciano	44	14	16	14	58	63	−5	58	
10	Sporting Cristal	44	16	9	19	71	55	+16	57	
11	José Gálvez	44	15	7	22	43	59	−16	52	
12	Total Chalaco	44	12	15	17	61	62	−1	51	
13	CNI	44	14	8	22	39	59	−20	50	
14	Alianza Atlético	44	12	13	19	44	59	−15	49	
15	Sport Áncash (R)	44	13	9	22	40	61	−21	48	2010 Segunda División
16	Coronel Bolognesi (R)	44	7	15	22	42	76	−34	36	2010 Segunda División

Updated to match(es) played on December 6, 2009. Source: FIFA Standings
Rules for classification: 1) points; 2) goal difference; 3) number of goals scored.
Universitario and Alianza Lima qualified to the Copa Libertadores group stage by winning their respective Liguillas.
(C) Champions; (R) Relegated

== Top goalscorers ==
23 goals

- (Paraguay) Richard Estigarribia (Total Chalaco)

20 goals

- (Colombia) Héctor Hurtado (Sporting Cristal)

15 goals

- (Argentina) (Peru) Sergio Ibarra (Juan Aurich)

14 goals

- (Peru) Ysrael Zúñiga (Melgar)
- (Argentina) Roberto Demus (U. César Vallejo)

13 goals

- (Colombia) Mayer Candelo (Juan Aurich)
- (Peru) Irven Ávila (Sport Huancayo)
- (Paraguay) Blas López (Sport Huancayo)

12 goals

- (Colombia) Martín Arzuaga (U. San Martín)
- (Peru) Gianfranco Labarthe (Universitario)

== See also ==
- 2009 Peruvian Segunda División
- 2009 Copa Perú
