= Alex Valera =

Peruvian footballer (born 1996)

Álex Valera
Personal information
- Full name: Álex Eduardo Valera Sandoval
- Date of birth: 16 May 1996 (age 30)
- Place of birth: Pomalca, Peru
- Height: 1.83 m (6 ft 0 in)
- Position: Forward

Team information
- Current team: Universitario de Deportes
- Number: 20

Senior career*
Years	Team	Apps	(Gls)
2016–2017	Pirata		
2017	Carlos Stein		
2018	Pirata	7	(2)
2019	Deportivo Garcilaso	7	(7)
2019–2020	Deportivo Llacuabamba	24	(9)
2021–2022	Universitario de Deportes	46	(27)
2022	Al Fateh	5	(0)
2023–	Universitario de Deportes	114	(58)

International career^{‡}
2021–	Peru	28	(5)
- * Club domestic league appearances and goals as of 19 September 2026 ‡ National team caps and goals as of 22:20, 3 October 2026 (UTC)

Álex Eduardo Valera Sandoval (born 16 May 1996) is a Peruvian professional footballer who plays as a forward for Peruvian Liga 1 club Universitario de Deportes and the Peru national team.

== Club career ==
Valera began his career in 2016 in Molinos El Pirata. After Pirata was eliminated from the 2017 Copa Perú, he was signed by Carlos Stein. He returned to Pirata for the 2018 Copa Perú, where he scored seven goals and played a key role in the squad that won the title and promotion to professional football. However, Valera did not stay in the team because its board preferred to sign forwards with more experience.

In 2019, he joined Deportivo Garcilaso for the 2019 Copa Perú, on request by manager Juan Carlos Bazalar, reaching the tournament's quarterfinals where Garcilaso was eliminated by Deportivo Llacuabamba. Shortly after, Valera was signed by Deportivo Llacuabamba for the final group stage of the Copa Perú, where the team finished second, thereby proceeding to the 2019 promotion play-offs, where the team also finished second, behind Atlético Grau, and was promoted to the 2020 Liga 1. He was renewed by Llacuabamba for the 2020 season and became one of the club's top scorers that year. The club ended up being relegated to the Liga 2 with three games still left to play after a 6–0 defeat against FBC Melgar.

On 4 December 2020, Valera reached a deal with Peruvian club Universitario de Deportes and joined their squad on a 1 year contract. He had been approached by other teams, including Alianza Lima, but decided to join Universitario for the opportunity to play the 2021 Copa Libertadores. That year, Valera played his first game with Universitario on matchday 1, in a 1–1 tie against FBC Melgar, and scored his first goal on matchday 2, in a 3–1 defeat against Academia Cantolao. After an injury to Enzo Gutiérrez, he became part of the starting XI in both the Liga 1 and the Copa Libertadores, in an attacking partnership with Alberto Quintero. In May, Valera scored a brace in a Libertadores group stage match: a 3–2 home victory against Independiente del Valle. The next season, he played the 2022 Copa Libertadores qualifying stages with Universitario.

On 1 August 2022, Valera joined Saudi Arabian club Al-Fateh on a three-year deal, despite the Peruvian transfer window having already closed. Barely five months later, during which he only played six games, and arguing a lack of payment, he left Al-Fateh and returned to Universitario in January 2023, signing for two seasons. That year, Valera won his first national title after Universitario defeated Alianza Lima in the 2023 Liga 1 finals. In January 2024, Shimizu S-Pulse of the J2 League made an offer for him, which was finally rejected after Universitario's directive offered Valera an improved salary. At the end of the season, Valera obtained his second consecutive national championship as Universitario won the 2024 Liga 1, with him as the team's goalscorer for the fourth consecutive year.

== International career ==
Valera was called up to the Peru national football team for the 2021 Copa América and made his senior international debut on 17 June 2021, coming off the bench in a 4–0 defeat against Brazil. He played a total of 2 matches during the tournament.

Peru reached the fifth place in the CONMEBOL qualifiers, which granted them the right to play the intercontinental playoff against Asia's representative Australia. Valera was substituted in the 116th minute of the game, which was dragged into the penalty shootout; during the penalty shootout, he missed the final shot in the sudden death and, thus, Peru lost 4–5 on penalties to Australia and failed to qualify for the 2022 FIFA World Cup.

== Beach football career ==
Valera also used to be a beach football player, representing the Peru national beach football team in the 2018 Copa América of Beach Football, scoring four goals.

== Career statistics ==
=== Club ===
As of match played 19 September 2026

Appearances and goals by club, season and competition
Club	Season	League			Cup		Continental		Total	
Club	Season	Division	Apps	Goals	Apps	Goals	Apps	Goals	Apps	Goals
Pirata FC	2016	Copa Perú	—		—		—		—	
Pirata FC	2017	Copa Perú	—		—		—		—	
Pirata FC	Total		—		—		—		—	
Carlos Stein	2017	Copa Perú	—		—		—		—	
Pirata FC	2018	Copa Perú	7	2	—		—		7	2
Deportivo Garcilaso	2019	Copa Perú	7	7	—		—		7	7
Deportivo Llacuabamba	2019	Copa Perú	4	2	—		—		4	2
Deportivo Llacuabamba	2020	Liga 1	21	9	—		—		21	9
Deportivo Llacuabamba	Total		25	11	—		—		25	11
Universitario de Deportes	2021	Liga 1	24	11	0	0	6	2	30	13
Universitario de Deportes	2022	Liga 1	17	12	—		2	0	19	12
Universitario de Deportes	Total		41	23	0	0	8	2	49	25
Al Fateh	2022-23	Saudi Pro League	5	0	1	0	0	0	6	0
Universitario de Deportes	2023	Liga 1	30	15	0	0	6	1	36	16
Universitario de Deportes	2024	Liga 1	26	13	0	0	5	0	31	13
Universitario de Deportes	2025	Liga 1	33	16	0	0	8	1	41	17
Universitario de Deportes	2026	Liga 1	25	14	0	0	6	2	31	16
Universitario de Deportes	Total		114	58	0	0	25	4	139	62
Career total			199	101	1	0	33	6	216	107

=== International ===
As of match played 3 October 2026

Appearances and goals by national team and year
National team	Year	Apps	Goals
Peru	2021	2	0
Peru	2022	10	3
Peru	2023	2	0
Peru	2024	6	0
Peru	2025	3	2
Peru	2026	5	0
Total		28	5

Scores and results list Peru's goal tally first, score column indicates score after each Valera goal.

List of international goals scored by Alex Valera
No.	Date	Venue	Opponent	Score	Result	Competition
1	16 January 2022	Estadio Nacional, Lima, Peru	Panama	1–0	1–1	Friendly
2	20 January 2022	Estadio Nacional, Lima, Peru	Jamaica	2–0	3–0	Friendly
3	16 November 2022	Estadio Monumental, Lima, Peru	Paraguay	1–0	1–0	Friendly
4	12 November 2025	Krestovsky Stadium, Saint Petersburg, Russia	Russia	1–1	1–1	Friendly
5	18 November 2025	Fisht Olympic Stadium, Sochi, Russia	Chile	1–0	1–2	Friendly

== Honours ==
Universitario de Deportes

- Peruvian Primera División: 2023, 2024, 2025

Pirata FC

- Copa Perú: 2018
