= 2021 Copa Bicentenario =

Tournament details
- Country: Peru
- Dates: 10 June – 27 July 2021
- Teams: 30

Final positions
- Champions: Sporting Cristal (1st title)
- Runner-up: Carlos A. Mannucci

Tournament statistics
- Matches played: 30
- Goals scored: 65 (2.17 per match)
- Top goal scorer(s): Yorleys Mena (3 goals)

The 2021 Copa Bicentenario was the 2nd edition of the Copa Bicentenario, the national cup competition of Peru, with the participation of the 18 teams of the Liga 1, and 12 teams of the Liga 2. The champions qualified for the 2022 Copa Sudamericana, as well as the Supercopa Peruana against the Liga 1 champions. Atlético Grau were the defending champions.

Sporting Cristal were the winners of the competition, beating Carlos A. Mannucci in the final by a 2–1 score to claim their first Copa Bicentenario title.

== Format ==
Unlike the previous edition, this year's edition featured a single elimination knockout stage, rather than the group stage. Each team is seeded in the first round, where each team plays one legged games and the winner advances to the final rounds. The final rounds feature a Round of 16, quarter-finals, semi-finals and final. Like the previous round, each match is played in one leg. 2019 Liga 1 champions, Sporting Cristal received a bye to the final rounds. The final is played on a neutral ground in one match.

== Schedule ==
The schedule of the competition was as follows:

Round	First leg
First round	10–13 June 2021
Final rounds	16 June – 27 July 2021
Round of 16	16–20 June 2021
Quarter-finals	23–25 June 2024
Semi-finals	4 July 2021
Final	27 July 2021

== Teams ==
18 teams of the 2021 Liga 1 and the 12 teams of the Liga 2 participated in the competition.

=== Stadia and locations ===
Locations of the 2021 Liga 1 and Liga 2 teams

Team	City
Liga 1
Academia Cantolao	Callao
Alianza Atlético	Sullana
Alianza Lima	Lima
Alianza Universidad	Huánuco
Ayacucho	Ayacucho
Binacional	Juliaca
Carlos A. Mannucci	Trujillo
Cienciano	Cusco
Cusco	Sicuani
Deportivo Municipal	Lima
Melgar	Arequipa
Sport Boys	Callao
Sport Huancayo	Huancayo
Sporting Cristal	Lima
Universidad César Vallejo	Trujillo
Universidad San Martín	Lima
Universitario	Lima
UTC	Cajamarca
Liga 2
Atlético Grau	Sullana
Carlos Stein	Olmos
Comerciantes Unidos	Cutervo
Cultural Santa Rosa	Andahuaylas
Deportivo Coopsol	Chancay
Deportivo Llacuabamba	Cajabamba; Cajamarca
Juan Aurich	Chiclayo
Pirata	Olmos
Santos	Nasca
Sport Chavelines	Pacasmayo
Unión Comercio	Nueva Cajamarca
Unión Huaral	Huaral

Because of the COVID-19 pandemic, the whole tournament is being played in seven stadiums:

Stadium	City
Alejandro Villanueva	Lima
Alberto Gallardo	Lima
Iván Elías Moreno	Lima
Miguel Grau	Callao
Monumental "U"	Lima
Universidad San Marcos	Lima
Villa Deportiva Nacional	Lima

== First round ==
10 June 2021	Juan Aurich (2)	0–1	Alianza Atlético (1)	Universidad San Marcos
10:00			Diego Saffadi 65'	Referee: Pablo López

10 June 2021	Unión Comercio (2)	4–1	Alianza Universidad (1)	Universidad San Marcos
12:45	Oscar Noguera 44'; Julián Muñoz 56'; Edis Ibargüen 73' (pen.); Dustin Rengifo 86'		Renato Espinosa 66'	Referee: Daniel Ureta

10 June 2021	Carlos Stein (2)	0–1	Ayacucho (1)	Universidad San Marcos
15:30			Lavandeira 43'	Referee: Luis Ciriaco

10 June 2021	Deportivo Municipal (1)	1–0	Academia Cantolao (1)	Universidad San Marcos
18:30	Érinson Ramírez 46'			Referee: Micke Palomino

11 June 2021	Binacional (1)	1–1 (3–5 p)	Cusco (1)	Universidad San Marcos
10:00	Arango 90+3' (pen.)		Erick Rossi 49'	Referee: Jonathan Zamora
	Penalties
	Arango (penalty scored); Mario Palomino (penalty scored); Zela (penalty scored); Carlos Uribe Zambrano (penalty missed)		(penalty scored) Aubert; (penalty scored) Rizzo; (penalty scored) Abisab; (penalty scored) Corrales; (penalty scored) Carranza

11 June 2021	Unión Huaral (2)	1–2	Universidad César Vallejo (1)	Universidad San Marcos
12:45	Mina 70'		Y. Mena 43' 49'	Referee: Alejandro Villanueva

11 June 2021	Santos (2)	1–3	Sport Boys (1)	Universidad San Marcos
15:30	Sandro Montesinos 75'		Óscar Guerra 11' (o.g.); Joao Villamarín 50'; Diego Ramírez 90+3'	Referee: Wilmer Villanueva

11 June 2021	Cultural Santa Rosa (2)	2–2 (3–2 p)	Alianza Lima (1)	Universidad San Marcos
18:30	Hugo Ancajima 17'; Pando 79'		Barcos 58'; Aguirre 67'	Referee: Jordy Espinoza
	Penalties
	Chávez (penalty missed); Gonzales-Vigil (penalty scored); Martín Díaz (penalty missed); Kevin Serna (penalty missed); Nicolini (penalty scored); José Zurita (penalty scored)		Ballón (penalty missed); Mora (penalty scored); Manzaneda (penalty missed); Ricardo Lagos (penalty scored); Mauricio Matzuda (penalty missed); Rojas (penalty missed)

12 June 2021	Comerciantes Unidos (2)	0–1	UTC (1)	Alberto Gallardo
12:15			Leonardo Villalba 14'	Referee: Gherson Huiman

12 June 2021	Pirata (2)	0–0 (4–2 p)	Cienciano (1)	Monumental
15:00				Referee: Beider Vásquez
	Penalties
	Héctor Zeta (penalty scored); Aarón Carnero (penalty scored); Yeison Hoyos (penalty scored); Accel Campos (penalty scored)		(penalty missed) Juan Romagnoli; (penalty scored) Koichi Aparicio; (penalty missed) Hansell Riojas; (penalty scored) Kevin Sandoval

12 June 2021	Deportivo Coopsol (2)	1–0	Universitario (1)	Universidad San Marcos
19:30	Maximiliano Zárate 56'			Referee: Luis Seminario

13 June 2021	Deportivo Llacuabamba (2)	2–2 (5–4 p)	Universidad San Martín (1)	Alberto Gallardo
12:15	Juan Huangal 36'; Claudio Velásquez 64'		Martín Pérez Guedes 11'; Carlos Monges 72' (pen.)	Referee: Bruno Pérez
	Penalties
	Henry Santisteban (penalty scored); Diego López (penalty scored); Luis Ramos (penalty scored); Segundo Acevedo (penalty missed); Níger Vega (penalty scored); Francesco Recalde (penalty scored)		Werner Schüler (penalty scored); Martín Pérez Guedes (penalty scored); Carlos Monges (penalty scored); José Hurtado (penalty missed); José María Inga (penalty scored); Mathías Llontop (penalty missed)

13 June 2021	Melgar (1)	1–2	Carlos A. Mannucci (1)	Monumental
15:00	Bernardo Cuesta 90+7'		Lucas Rodríguez 13'; José Carlos Fernández 69'	Referee: Hibert Villegas

13 June 2021	Sport Chavelines (2)	0–0 (6–5 p)	Sport Huancayo (1)	Universidad San Marcos
19:30				Referee: David Huamán
	Penalties
	Hernán Hinostroza (penalty scored); Johnny Mena (penalty scored); Matías Sen (penalty scored); Marvin Ríos (penalty scored); Diego Mayora (penalty missed); Ernesto Hernández (penalty scored); Arón Torres (penalty scored)		Marcio Valverde (penalty scored); Jarlín Quintero (penalty scored); Marcos Lliuya (penalty scored); Alexis Rojas (penalty scored); Charles Montalvo (penalty missed); Diego Valoyes (penalty scored); Giancarlo Carmona (penalty missed)

== Final Rounds ==
=== Bracket ===
First round
Sporting Cristal	3
Cusco	2
Ayacucho	0 (4)
Alianza Atlético	0 (3)
Universidad César Vallejo	1
Sport Boys	2
Cultural Santa Rosa	0
Unión Comercio	1
Atlético Grau	0 (5)
Deportivo Municipal	0 (4)
Deportivo Coopsol	2
Sport Chavelines	3
Deportivo Llacuabamba	0
Carlos A. Mannucci	3
Pirata	0
UTC	1

Quarter-finals
Sporting Cristal	2
Ayacucho	0
Sport Boys	0 (3)
Unión Comercio	0 (4)
Atlético Grau	2
Sport Chavelines	1
Carlos A. Mannucci	0 (4)
UTC	0 (2)

Semi-finals
Sporting Cristal	2
Unión Comercio	0
Atlético Grau	2 (3)
Carlos A. Mannucci	2 (5)

Final
Sporting Cristal	2
Carlos A. Mannucci	1

=== Round of 16 ===
16 June 2021	Ayacucho (1)	0–0 (4–3 p)	Alianza Atlético (1)	Villa Deportiva Nacional
10:00				Referee: Luis Seminario
	Penalties
	Janio Pósito (penalty scored); Jesús Mendieta (penalty scored); Carlos Olascuaga (penalty scored); Othoniel Arce (penalty scored)		Rinaldo Cruzado (penalty scored); Azmahar Ariano (penalty scored); Willy Pretel (penalty missed); Ignacio Barrios (penalty scored); Diego Saffadi (penalty missed)

16 June 2021	Atlético Grau (2)	0–0 (5–4 p)	Deportivo Municipal (1)	Villa Deportiva Nacional
15:00				Referee: Bruno Pérez
	Penalties
	Santiago Pallares (penalty scored); Roberto Céspedes (penalty scored); Paulo De la Cruz (penalty scored); Mario Ceballos (penalty scored); Neil Marcos (penalty scored)		Érinson Ramírez (penalty scored); Alexis Cossío (penalty scored); Jean Pierre Archimbaud (penalty scored); Luis Felipe Cardoza (penalty scored); Hernán Rengifo (penalty missed)

17 June 2021	Universidad César Vallejo (1)	1–2	Sport Boys (1)	Iván Elías Moreno
13:00	Yorleys Mena 82'		Joao Villamarín 37'; José Bolívar 70'	Referee: Michael Espinoza

18 June 2021	UTC (1)	1–0	Pirata (2)	Universidad San Marcos
13:00	Gaspar Gentile 77'			Referee: Gean Barbagelata

19 June 2021	Unión Comercio (2)	1–0	Cultural Santa Rosa (2)	Miguel Grau
10:00	Sergio Almirón 63'			Referee: Beider Vásquez

19 June 2021	Sporting Cristal (1)	3–2	Cusco (1)	Miguel Grau
15:00	Irven Ávila 19'; Erick Rossi 38' (o.g.); Nilson Loyola 90+8'		Alfredo Carrillo 48'; Matías Abisab 90+4'	Referee: Augusto Menéndez

19 June 2021	Carlos A. Mannucci (1)	3–0	Deportivo Llacuabamba (2)	Universidad San Marcos
19:00	Kléiber Palomino 25'; Javier Núñez 34' 88'			Referee: David Huamán

20 June 2021	Sport Chavelines (2)	3–2	Deportivo Coopsol (2)	Iván Elías Moreno
14:00	Kevin Santamaría 17'; Luis Aguirre 37'; Marlon Ruidías 69'		Róbinson Alzamora 43'; Félix Espinosa 56'	Referee: Joel Alarcón

=== Quarterfinals ===
23 June 2021	Unión Comercio (2)	0–0 (4–3 p)	Sport Boys (1)	Alberto Gallardo
13:00				Referee: Edwin Ordoñez
	Penalties
	Sergio Almirón (penalty scored); Cristian Neira (penalty scored); Edis Ibargüen (penalty scored); Joffre Vásquez (penalty scored)		Sebastián Penco (penalty scored); Luis Ramírez (penalty missed); Joao Villamarín (penalty scored); Jeremy Rostaing (penalty scored); Paolo Fuentes (penalty missed)

24 June 2021	Sport Chavelines (2)	1–2	Atlético Grau (2)	Miguel Grau
10:30	Marlon Ruidías 43'		Marcelo Gaona 46'; Johny Cano 55' (pen.)	Referee: Fernando Legario

24 June 2021	UTC (1)	0–0 (2–4 p)	Carlos A. Mannucci (1)	Miguel Grau
15:00				Referee: Joel Alarcón
	Penalties
	Nicolás Ortiz (penalty missed); Ray Sandoval (penalty scored); Edwuin Gómez (penalty scored); Paulo Goyoneche (penalty missed)		Javier Núñez (penalty scored); Horacio Benincasa (penalty scored); Jesús Barco (penalty scored); Gonzalo Godoy (penalty scored)

25 June 2021	Ayacucho (1)	0–2	Sporting Cristal (1)	Iván Elías Moreno
15:00			Joao Grimaldo 73'; Diego Soto 88'	Referee: Michael Espinoza

=== Semifinals ===
4 July 2021	Carlos A. Mannucci (1)	2–2 (5–3 p)	Atlético Grau (2)	Iván Elías Moreno
12:00	David Dioses 20'; Jean Pierre Fuentes 53'		Santiago Pallares 82'; Andy Benites 90+1'	Referee: Michael Espinoza
	Penalties
	Javier Núñez (penalty scored); Lucas Rodríguez (penalty scored); Gonzalo Godoy (penalty scored); Horacio Benincasa (penalty scored); Rely Fernández (penalty scored)		Sentiago Pallares (penalty missed); Adrián Quiroz (penalty scored); Paulo De La Cruz (penalty scored); Mario Ceballos (penalty scored)

4 July 2021	Sporting Cristal (1)	2–0	Unión Comercio (2)	Miguel Grau
15:00	Irven Ávila 54'; Horacio Calcaterra 58'			Referee: Bruno Pérez

=== Final ===
27 July 2021	Sporting Cristal (1)	2–1	Carlos A. Mannucci (1)	Alejandro Villanueva, Lima
19:00	Percy Liza 58'; Percy Liza 68'		Felipe Rodríguez 66' (pen.)	Referee: Edwin Ordóñez

== Top goalscorers ==
Rank	Name	Club	Goals
1	(Colombia) Yorleys Mena	Universidad César Vallejo	3
2	(Peru) Joao Villamarín	Sport Boys	2
2	(Peru) Marlon Ruidías	Sport Chavelines	2
2	(Peru) Irven Ávila	Sporting Cristal	2
2	(Peru) Javier Núñez	Carlos A. Mannucci	2
2	(Peru) Percy Liza	Sporting Cristal	2

== See also ==
- 2021 Liga 1
- 2021 Liga 2
- 2021 Copa Perú
