= 2022 Liga 2 (Peru) =

Liga 2
- Season: 2022
- Dates: 2 April – 25 September 2022
- Champions: Cusco (1st title)
- Promoted: Cusco; Unión Comercio
- Relegated: Sport Chavelines
- Matches: 156
- Goals: 434 (2.78 per match)
- Top goalscorer: Matías Sen; José Fajardo (14 goals each)

The 2022 Liga 2 season was the 70th edition of the second tier of Federación Peruana de Futbol. This year's edition started on 2 April 2022 and ended on 25 September 2022.

== Teams ==
=== Team changes ===
Promoted from 2021 Copa Perú	Relegated from 2021 Liga 1	Promoted to 2022 Liga 1
▲ Alfonso Ugarte (2nd)	▼ Cusco (17th) ▼ Alianza Universidad (18th)	▲ Atlético Grau (1st) ▲ Carlos Stein (2nd)

=== Stadia and Locations ===
Locations of the 2022 Liga 2 teams

Team	City	Stadium	Capacity
Alfonso Ugarte	Puno	Guillermo Briceño Rosamedina	20,030
Alianza Universidad	Huánuco	Heraclio Tapia	25,000
Comerciantes Unidos	Cutervo	Juan Maldonado Gamarra	12,000
Cusco	Cusco	Garcilaso	42,056
Deportivo Coopsol	San Vicente de Cañete	Roberto Yáñez	5,000
Deportivo Llacuabamba	Cajamarca	Héroes de San Ramón	18,000
Juan Aurich	Chiclayo	Municipal de la Juventud	2,000
Los Chankas	Andahuaylas	Monumental de Condebamba	10,000
Pirata	Olmos	Francisco Mendoza Pizarro	5,000
Santos	Nasca	José Picasso Peratta	8,000
Sport Chavelines	Pacasmayo	Carlos A. Olivares	2,000
Unión Comercio	Nueva Cajamarca	IPD de Moyobamba	12,000
Unión Huaral	Huaral	Julio Lores Colan	10,000

== Torneo Apertura ==
=== Standings ===
Pos	Team	Pld	W	D	L	GF	GA	GD	Pts	Qualification
1	Cusco	12	9	2	1	20	7	+13	29	Advance to Title Playoff
2	Unión Comercio	12	9	1	2	25	9	+16	28	
3	Los Chankas	12	6	2	4	17	14	+3	20	
4	Unión Huaral	12	4	6	2	12	10	+2	18	
5	Comerciantes Unidos	12	5	2	5	19	19	0	17	
6	Santos	12	4	4	4	18	16	+2	16	
7	Alfonso Ugarte	12	4	4	4	16	17	−1	16	
8	Deportivo Llacuabamba	12	4	3	5	14	15	−1	15	
9	Deportivo Coopsol	12	3	4	5	12	17	−5	13	
10	Juan Aurich	12	3	3	6	19	26	−7	12	
11	Alianza Universidad	12	2	4	6	17	22	−5	10	
12	Pirata	12	2	4	6	6	11	−5	10	
13	Sport Chavelines	12	2	3	7	6	18	−12	9	

Source: ADFP-SD - official site
Rules for classification: 1) points; 2) goal difference; 3) goals scored; 4) draw.

=== Results ===
Home \ Away	UGA	AUH	CUS	COM	COO	LLA	JA	CST	PIR	SAN	CHA	UCO	HUA
Alfonso Ugarte		2–1				1–0				1–1	2–0	1–1	1–1
Alianza Universidad			0–2	1–2		1–1				4–1	1–1		1–3
Cusco	2–2			3–2	3–0		2–0	2–1	2–0				
Comerciantes Unidos	2–1				4–1		4–3	1–0	1–1			2–3	
Deportivo Coopsol	2–1	1–1						2–0	1–1			0–1	0–1
Deportivo Llacuabamba			0–0	1–0	2–1		2–1	1–2			5–1		
Juan Aurich	4–3	3–3			1–2			4–2	0–2			2–1	
Los Chankas	3–0	3–2							0–0	2–0		2–1	1–1
Pirata	0–1	0–1				1–0				0–1		0–2	1–1
Santos			1–2	2–0	2–2	2–2	4–0				3–0		
Sport Chavelines			0–1	2–0	0–0		1–1	0–1	1–0				
Unión Comercio		3–1	1–0			2–0				3–1	3–0		4–0
Unión Huaral			0–1	1–1		3–0	0–0			0–0	1–0		

Source: Liga 2 - official site
Legend: Blue = home team win; Yellow = draw; Red = away team win.

== Torneo Clausura ==
=== Standings ===
Pos	Team	Pld	W	D	L	GF	GA	GD	Pts	Qualification
1	Cusco	12	9	2	1	27	9	+18	29	Advance to Title Playoff
2	Unión Comercio	12	7	2	3	30	10	+20	23	
3	Santos	12	7	2	3	17	13	+4	23	
4	Comerciantes Unidos	12	6	2	4	18	16	+2	20	
5	Alianza Universidad	12	5	4	3	26	17	+9	19	
6	Alfonso Ugarte	12	6	1	5	18	16	+2	19	
7	Unión Huaral	12	5	2	5	15	19	−4	17	
8	Los Chankas	12	4	4	4	23	23	0	16	
9	Pirata	12	3	4	5	13	19	−6	13	
10	Deportivo Llacuabamba	12	3	3	6	16	23	−7	12	
11	Deportivo Coopsol	12	2	5	5	11	20	−9	11	
12	Juan Aurich	12	3	2	7	12	24	−12	11	
13	Sport Chavelines	12	0	3	9	7	24	−17	3	

Source: ADFP-SD - official site
Rules for classification: 1) points; 2) goal difference; 3) goals scored; 4) draw.

=== Results ===
Home \ Away	UGA	AUH	CUS	COM	COO	LLA	JA	CST	PIR	SAN	CHA	UCO	HUA
Alfonso Ugarte			0–1	2–0	1–0		4–0	2–1	2–1				
Alianza Universidad	4–2				6–1		3–1	2–2	3–0			1–1	
Cusco		2–1				2–0				4–1	3–0	4–1	2–0
Comerciantes Unidos		3–1	2–1			2–1				1–1	4–0		3–1
Deportivo Coopsol			1–2	0–0		2–0	0–0			0–1	2–1		
Deportivo Llacuabamba	2–3	2–1							0–0	3–0		0–3	3–1
Juan Aurich			0–3	2–1		2–2				0–1	3–0		4–1
Los Chankas			1–1	2–0	2–2	6–2	4–0				3–2		
Pirata			2–2	1–2	2–2		1–0	1–1			1–0		
Santos	1–0	2–2						5–0	1–2			1–0	1–0
Sport Chavelines	1–1	0–1				1–1				1–2		0–0	1–3
Unión Comercio	4–1			4–0	4–0		4–0	4–0	4–1				
Unión Huaral	1–0	1–1			1–1			2–1	2–1			2–1	

Updated to match(es) played on 2022. Source: Liga 2 - official site
Legend: Blue = home team win; Yellow = draw; Red = away team win.

== Aggregate table ==
Pos	Team	Pld	W	D	L	GF	GA	GD	Pts	Qualification
1	Cusco (C)	24	18	4	2	47	16	+31	58	2023 Liga 1
2	Unión Comercio (O, P)	24	16	3	5	53	18	+35	51	Advance to Promotion playoff
3	Santos	24	11	6	7	35	29	+6	37 (Note: Santos was docked a total of 2 points for outstanding debts with the SAFAP.)	
4	Los Chankas	24	10	6	8	40	37	+3	36	
5	Alfonso Ugarte	24	10	5	9	36	34	+2	35	
6	Comerciantes Unidos	24	11	4	9	37	35	+2	34 (Note: Comerciantes Unidos was docked a total of 1 point for outstanding debts with the SAFAP.)	
7	Unión Huaral	24	9	8	7	27	29	−2	33 (Note: Unión Huaral was docked a total of 2 points for outstanding debts with the SAFAP.)	
8	Alianza Universidad	24	7	8	9	43	39	+4	29	
9	Deportivo Llacuabamba	24	7	6	11	30	38	−8	27	
10	Deportivo Coopsol	24	5	9	10	23	37	−14	24	
11	Pirata	24	5	8	11	19	30	−11	23	
12	Juan Aurich	24	6	5	13	31	50	−19	21 (Note: Juan Aurich was docked a total of 2 points for outstanding debts with the SAFAP.)	
13	Sport Chavelines (R)	24	2	6	16	13	42	−29	9 (Note: Sport Chavelines was docked a total of 3 points for outstanding debts with the SAFAP.)	Relegation to 2023 Copa Perú

Updated to match(es) played on 11 September 2022. Source: ADFP-SD - official site
Rules for classification: 1) points; 2) goal difference; 3) goals scored; 4) draw.
(C) Champions; (O) Play-off winners; (P) Promoted; (R) Relegated

== Title playoff ==
As Cusco finished as champion of the Apertura and Clausura tournaments, no playoff games were played. Cusco were the overall champions and Unión Comercio were the overall runners-up

== Promotion playoff ==
6 November 2022
13:00 UTC−5

Unión Comercio	3–0	Ayacucho
Medrano 49', 64'; Sánchez 90+3'	Report

Estadio Carlos Vidaurre García, Tarapoto
Referee: Joel Alarcón
13 November 2022
15:00 UTC−5

Ayacucho	2–1	Unión Comercio
Regalado 45+4', 72'	Report	Zeta 12'

Estadio Ciudad de Cumaná, Ayacucho
Referee: Edwin Ordóñez

Unión Comercio won 4–2 on aggregate and were promoted to Liga 1. Ayacucho were relegated to Liga 2.

== Top goalscorers ==
Rank	Name	Club	Goals
1	(Argentina) Matías Sen	Comerciantes Unidos	14
1	(Panama) José Fajardo	Cusco	14
3	(Panama) Abdiel Ayarza	Cusco	12
4	(Argentina) Sergio Almirón	Unión Comercio	10
4	(Paraguay) Sergio Samudio	Juan Aurich	10

== See also ==
- 2022 Liga 1
- 2022 Copa Bicentenario
- 2022 Copa Perú
- 2022 Torneo de Promoción y Reserva
