= Iván Mayta =

Peruvian footballer (born 1999)

Personal information
- Full name: Iván José Mayta Apaza
- Date of birth: 23 March 1999 (age 27)
- Place of birth: Arequipa, Peru
- Height: 1.87 m (6 ft 2 in)
- Position: Goalkeeper

Team information
- Current team: Nacional FBC
- Number: 1

Youth career
- –2015: Deportivo Municipal
- 2016–2018: Deportivo Binacional

Senior career*
Years	Team	Apps	(Gls)
2018	Deportivo Binacional	0	(0)
2019	Los Caimanes	16	(0)
2020	Cusco	0	(0)
2020	→ Unión Comercio (loan)	1	(0)
2021	Deportivo Maristas		
2022	Sport Chavelines	8	(0)
2022	Alfonso Ugarte	1	(0)
2023	FBC Aurora		
2024	Atlético Universidad		
2024–	Nacional FBC		
- * Club domestic league appearances and goals as of 22:15, 11 December 2022 (UTC)

Iván José Mayta Apaza (born 23 March 1999) is a Peruvian footballer who plays as a goalkeeper for Nacional FBC.

== Club career ==
=== Deportivo Binacional ===
Mayta joined Deportivo Binacional in 2016 from Deportivo Municipal and was quickly promoted to the club's reserve team. In 2017, he began training with the first team. Helping Binacional to win the 2017 Copa Perú, 17-year old Mayta was promoted to the first team squad for the 2018 season. However, he wasn't able to break through and left the club at the end of the year.

=== Los Caimanes ===
On 27 March 2019 Peruvian Segunda División club, Los Caimanes, confirmed the signing of Mayta on a deal until the end of the season. He immediately became a regular starter for the club and played 20 games in total, with 46 conceded goals. Los Caimanes finished the season with an 11th place and was relegated to Copa Perú.

=== Cusco ===
Ahead of the 2020 season, Mayta joined Peruvian Primera División club Cusco FC. He got shirt number 12. In October 2020, he joined Unión Comercio on loan for the rest of the year. Mayta left Cusco at the end of 2020.

=== Deportivo Maristas ===
On 6 September 2021, Mayta joined Deportivo Maristas.

=== Sport Chavelines ===
In February 2022, Mayta moved to Peruvian Segunda División side Sport Chavelines.

=== Lower clubs ===
After a spell at Alfonso Ugarte in the second half of 2022, Mayta moved to FBC Aurora in 2023.

Ahead of the 2024 season, Mayta joined Atlético Universidad.

In October 2024, Mayta moved to Nacional FBC.

== International career ==
In March 2018, Mayta was called up to the Peruvian U20 national team after winning the 2017 Copa Perú with Deportivo Binacional. However, he never made his debut.
