= Juan Carlos Bazalar =

Peruvian football player and manager (born 1968)

Personal information
- Full name: Juan Carlos Bazalar Cruzado
- Date of birth: 23 February 1968 (age 58)
- Place of birth: Lima, Peru
- Height: 1.80 m (5 ft 11 in)
- Position: Defensive midfielder

Team information
- Current team: Los Chankas (manager)

Youth career
- Universitario

Senior career*
| Years | Team | Apps | (Gls) |
| 1987–1994 | Universitario | | |
| 1995 | Ciclista Lima | 27 | (0) |
| 1996 | Sport Boys | 27 | (5) |
| 1997–1998 | Alianza Lima | 61 | (4) |
| 1998–1999 | Veria | 19 | (0) |
| 2000 | Melgar | 33 | (4) |
| 2001–2002 | Alianza Lima | 77 | (4) |
| 2003–2008 | Cienciano | 205 | (12) |
| 2009 | Sport Áncash | 14 | (0) |

International career
| 1989–2007 | Peru | 26 | (0) |

Managerial career
- 2012–2013: Pacifico
- 2014: Atlético Torino
- 2018: Molinos El Pirata
- 2019: Deportivo Garcilaso
- 2019: Carlos Stein
- 2020: Franciscano San Román
- 2020: Carlos Stein
- 2021: Comerciantes Unidos
- 2021: Los Chankas
- 2021–2022: ADT
- 2022: Ecosem Pasco
- 2022: Real Sociedad Chugay
- 2023–2024: Los Chankas
- 2024: ADA
- 2024–2025: Comerciantes
- 2025: Santos de Nasca
- 2026: Alianza Universidad
- 2026: Atlético Nacional Iquitos
- 2026–: Los Chankas
- * Club domestic league appearances and goals

Juan Carlos Bazalar Cruzado (born 23 February 1968) is a Peruvian football manager and former player who played as a defensive midfielder. He is the current manager of Los Chankas.

== Playing career ==
=== Club career ===
Bazalar developed as part of the youth system of Universitario de Deportes, and played his first professional game by Universitario to continue his development as a player.

=== International career ===
Despite his age he was still periodically called up for Peru. He represented Peru in the 2007 Copa America. Bazalar has made 26 appearances for the Peru national football team.

== Managerial career ==
After becoming a coach, Bazalar's career was marked by success, including winning the Peruvian Second Division championship in 2012 with Pacífico FC. He then won three Copa Perú titles in 2018, 2019 and 2021, managing Pirata FC, Carlos Stein and ADT of Tarma, respectively.

== Personal life ==
He is also the father of footballer Alonso Bazalar. He had expressed a wish to play alongside his son who was part of the U-17 team that went to the U-17 World Cup in 2007.

== Honours ==
=== Player ===
Universitario de Deportes

- Peruvian First Division (4): 1987, 1990, 1992, 1993

Alianza Lima

- Torneo Apertura: 1997
- Torneo Clausura: 1997
- Peruvian First Division: 1997

Cienciano

- Copa Sudamericana: 2003
- Recopa Sudamericana: 2004
- Torneo Apertura: 2005
- Torneo Clausura: 2006

=== Manager ===
Pacífico FC

- Peruvian Second Division: 2012

Pirata FC

- Copa Perú: 2018

Carlos Stein

- Copa Perú: 2019

ADT (Tarma)

- Copa Perú: 2021
