= Fabrizio Roca =

Peruvian footballer (born 2002)

Personal information
- Full name: Fabrizio Fernando Roca Reyes
- Date of birth: 20 March 2002 (age 24)
- Place of birth: Lima, Peru
- Position: Forward

Team information
- Current team: Sport River

Senior career*
Years	Team	Apps	(Gls)
2020	Deportivo Llacuabamba	2	(0)
2021	Comerciantes Unidos	0	(0)
2022–2025	Sport Boys	68	(14)
2025	→ Juan Pablo II College (loan)	17	(1)
2026	Alianza Universidad	2	(0)
2026	Juventud Bellavista		
2026–	Sport River		
- * Club domestic league appearances and goals as of 12:16, 14 September 2026 (UTC)

Fabrizio Fernando Roca Reyes (born 20 March 2002) is a Peruvian footballer who plays as a forward for Sport River in the Copa Perú.

== Club career ==
=== Early career ===
Born in Lima, Roca began his professional career at Deportivo Llacuabamba. He made his debut in the Peruvian Primera División on 9 October 2020 as a late substitute in a 2–0 home loss to Sport Huancayo. He played one more game and was released when his team were relegated at the end of the season. He came close to retiring due to not finding a new team for 2021, eventually signing for Comerciantes Unidos in July.

=== Sport Boys ===
Early in 2022, Roca was approached by Club Universitario de Deportes in his hometown, who said that the 20-year-old would play in their reserve team. He then signed for Sport Boys of Callao due to receiving a more satisfactory contract offer. He played six games, four as a starter, and scored his first career goal on 15 October in a 5–3 home loss to Sporting Cristal, after taking advantage of a poor pass by opponent Omar Merlo.

In 2023, Roca scored 9 goals in 34 games for Sport Boys as they avoided relegation. On 3 October, he scored twice in a 2–1 win over Cusco FC at the Estadio Miguel Grau. At the end of the season, he extended his contract until the end of 2025.

After having scored 4 times in 24 games in 2024, Sport Boys loaned Roca for the following season to newly promoted ADC Juan Pablo II College. He made his debut on 9 February in the first game of the campaign, playing the final 14 minutes of a 1–0 loss away to his parent club. He played 17 games of the Apertura, and scored once against Cusco FC, before being recalled for the second half of the season to cover the injured Luciano Nequecaur, but made only five appearances.

=== Later career ===
Out of contract at the end of 2025, 23-year-old Roca signed for Alianza Universidad, who were newly relegated to Liga 2 after surpassing only the expelled Deportivo Binacional FC in the league table. His new manager was Juan Carlos Bazalar, who had a reputation for rebuilding careers. In June, having only played twice, Roca he made a surprise move to Juventud Bellavista, newly promoted to the fifth-tier Ligas Departamentales del Perú as champions of the Ligas Provinciales del Peru for the Trujillo District. Three months later, he moved up a division to Sport River in the Copa Perú.

== International career ==
In October 2023, Roca was called up to the Peru national team for 2026 FIFA World Cup qualifiers against Argentina and Chile. Still uncapped, he was called up by manager Jorge Fossati to the preliminary squad for the 2024 Copa América in the United States, but missed out on the final 26-man squad.

== Career statistics ==
=== Club ===
As of match played 14 June 2024

Season	Club	League			National cup		Total	
Season	Club	Division	Apps	Goals	Apps	Goals	Apps	Goals
2020	Deportivo Llacuabamba	Liga 1	2	0	0	0	2	0
2022	Sport Boys	Liga 1	6	1	0	0	6	1
2023	Sport Boys	Liga 1	23	9	0	0	23	9
2024	Sport Boys	Liga 1	15	2	0	0	15	2
Career total			57	12	-		57	12
