= Futuro Majes =

- Full name: Club Deportivo Futuro Majes
- Founded: 2001
- Ground: Estadio Municipal de Majes, Majes
- League: Copa Perú
Home colours	Away colours

Club Deportivo Futuro Majes (sometimes referred as Futuro Majes) is a Peruvian football club, playing in the city of Majes, Caylloma, Arequipa, Peru.

== History ==
The Club Deportivo Futuro Majes was founded on 2001.

In 2013 Copa Perú, the club qualified to the Departamental Stage, but was eliminated when it finished in 3rd place.

In 2014 Copa Perú, the club qualified to the National Stage, but was eliminated by Fuerza Minera in the Round of 16.

In 2017 Copa Perú, the club qualified to the Departamental Stage, but was eliminated by Los Chinitos de Atico in the First Stage.

In 2018 Copa Perú, the club qualified to the Departamental Stage, but was eliminated by Social Corire in the First Stage.

In 2019 Copa Perú, the club qualified to the National Stage, but was eliminated by Sport Chavelines in the Round of 32.

In 2021 Copa Perú, the club qualified to the National Stage, but was eliminated by Alfonso Ugarte in the Fase 3 – Interregional.

== Honours ==
=== Regional ===
- Liga Departamental de Arequipa:

Winners (1): 2014
Runner-up (1): 2019

- Liga Provincial de Caylloma:

Winners (1): 2019
Runner-up (4): 2013, 2014, 2017, 2018

- Liga Distrital de El Pedregal – Majes:

Runner-up (1): 2014

== See also ==
- List of football clubs in Peru
- Peruvian football league system
