= 2019 Peruvian promotion play-offs =

2019 Peruvian promotion play-off
- Season: 2019
- Promoted: Atlético Grau; Deportivo Llacuabamba
- Matches: 6
- Goals: 11 (1.83 per match)
- Highest scoring: Deportivo Coopsol 4–0 Sport Chavelines (December 14)

The 2019 Peruvian promotion play-offs or Cuadrangular de Ascenso 2019 will be held in December 2019 with all games being played at a neutral ground yet to be determined. The play-offs determined the third and fourth team to be promoted to the Liga 1 following that tournament's expansion. The teams placed 2nd and 3rd in the 2019 Liga 2 and 2019 Copa Perú will take part in the promotion play-offs. The top two placed team in the play-offs will gain promotion to the 2020 Liga 1 and the bottom two will qualify to the 2020 Liga 2.

== Background ==
The Peruvian Football Federation took control of the local domestic league from the Professional Football Sports Association, the tournament organizers, in 2019 and announced that the Peruvian first division tournament would be re-branded for 2019. With this re-branding, the tournament was expand from 16 to 18 teams and then to 20 in 2020. At the beginning of the 2019 season, it was announced that the teams that finished 2nd and 3rd in the bottom two tiers of the Peruvian football league system would compete on the promotion play-offs at the end of the year to decide which two teams would receive the expansion slots.

At the beginning of the 2019 season, the Peruvian Football Federation decided against the decision of further expanding the first division tournament to 20 teams. The teams from the second division refused to begin the 2019 Liga 2 tournament until they received confirmation from the Federation that the expansion agreement reached in 2018 would be respected. As such the Federation accepted the terms and decided to once again organize a promotion play-off similar to the one used in 2018.

== Road to the play-offs ==
=== Segunda División ===
==== Bracket ====
Quarterfinals
5	Santos	0	0	0
6	Deportivo Coopsol	1	4	5
4	Atlético Grau	2	3	5
7	Comerciantes Unidos	3	0	3

Semifinals
2	Alianza Atlético	0	1	1
6	Deportivo Coopsol	1	1	2
3	Juan Aurich	1	2	3
4	Atlético Grau	4	0	4

Finals
6	Deportivo Coopsol
4	Atlético Grau

==== Liguilla Quarterfinals ====
Team 1	Agg.	Team 2	1st leg	2nd leg
Comerciantes Unidos	3–5	Atlético Grau	3–2	0–3
Deportivo Coopsol	5–0	Santos	1–0	4–0

==== Liguilla Semifinals ====
Team 1	Agg.	Team 2	1st leg	2nd leg
Deportivo Coopsol	2–1	Alianza Atlético	1–0	1–1
Atlético Grau	4–3	Juan Aurich	4–1	0–2

=== Copa Perú ===
==== Final group stage ====
Pos	Team	Pld	W	D	L	GF	GA	GD	Pts	Qualification
1	Carlos Stein	3	2	1	0	6	2	+4	7	2020 Liga 1
2	Deportivo Llacuabamba	3	1	1	1	6	4	+2	4	Promotion Play-off
3	Sport Chavelines	3	0	2	1	3	4	−1	2	Promotion Play-off
4	Sport Estrella	3	0	2	1	2	7	−5	2	

Source: Dechalaca.com
Rules for classification: 1) points; 2) goal difference; 3) goals scored; 4) draw.

== Promotion play-offs ==
=== Standings ===
Pos	Team	Pld	W	D	L	GF	GA	GD	Pts	Qualification
1	Atlético Grau	3	1	2	0	2	0	+2	5	2020 Liga 1
2	Deportivo Llacuabamba	3	1	2	0	3	2	+1	5	2020 Liga 1
3	Deportivo Coopsol	3	1	1	1	5	3	+2	4	2020 Liga 2
4	Sport Chavelines	3	0	1	2	1	6	−5	1	2020 Liga 2

Updated to match(es) played on unknown. Source:
Rules for classification: 1) points; 2) goal difference; 3) goals scored; 4) draw.

=== Results ===
7 December 2019
13:00

Deportivo Llacuabamba	2–1	Sport Chavelines
Guillermo Vernal 56' 74'		Jonathan Sauñe 44'

Estadio Miguel Grau, Callao
Referee: Luis Seminario
7 December 2019
15:15

Atlético Grau	2–0	Deportivo Coopsol
Ronal Huaccha 20'; Steven Aponzá 87'

Estadio Miguel Grau, Callao
Referee: Alejandro Villanueva
11 December 2019
17:45

Deportivo Llacuabamba	1–1	Deportivo Coopsol
Marlon Ruidías 83'		Pedro Gutiérrez 61' (pen.)

Estadio Miguel Grau, Callao
Referee: Jordi Espinoza
11 December 2019
20:00

Sport Chavelines	0–0	Atlético Grau

Estadio Miguel Grau, Callao
Referee: Augusto Menéndez
14 December 2019
13:00

Sport Chavelines	0–4	Deportivo Coopsol
		Israel Kahn 11' 40'; Brian Bernaola 35'; José Gómez 65'

Estadio Miguel Grau, Callao
Referee: Jesús Cartagena
14 December 2019
15:15

Atlético Grau	0–0	Deportivo Llacuabamba

Estadio Miguel Grau, Callao
Referee: Yovani Quevedo

== See also ==
- 2019 Liga 1 (Peru)
- 2019 Liga 2 (Peru)
- 2019 Copa Perú
