= 2021 Sporting Cristal season =

Football league season

Sporting Cristal
2021 season
- President: Federico Cúneo
- Stadium: Alberto Gallardo, Lima
- Liga 1: Fase 1: First (1°) (Group B); Final Fase 1 Champions; Fase 2: Second (2°); Aggregate Table: First (1°); Final National: Runners-up; Runners-up National (2°)
- Copa Bicentenario: Final Champions
- Copa Libertadores: Group stage
- Copa Sudamericana: Quarter Finals
Home colours	Away colours	Third colours

The 2021 Sporting Cristal season were the Sixty-Sixth (66.º) of the club from its foundation in 1955, Sixty-Six (66) participations consecutives in the top-flight of Peruvian Primera División (of 105 Editions) with denomination last Liga 1. In Previous Season the club qualified as Champions National 1st Place of the 2020 Liga 1.

Sporting Cristal were a of eighteen (18) clubs in the Third edition (3.º) Liga 1, the competition most important of the Peruvian football. The club played the Peruvian Primera División, Copa Libertadores for Thirty-Sixth (36th) Time, and Copa Sudamericana for Third (3rd) Time.

== Liga 1 ==
=== Fase 1 (Group B) ===
Pos	Team	Pld	W	D	L	GF	GA	GD	Pts
1	Sporting Cristal	9	8	0	1	18	6	+12	24
2	Univ. César Vallejo	9	5	3	1	17	8	+9	18
3	Alianza Lima	9	4	4	1	12	6	+6	16

== See also ==
- Club Sporting Cristal
- 2021 Liga 1
- 2021 Copa Bicentenario
