= 2021 Liga 2 (Peru) =

Liga 2
- Season: 2021
- Dates: 19 May – 15 October 2021
- Champions: Atlético Grau (1st title)
- Promoted: Atlético Grau; Carlos Stein
- Top goalscorer: Santiago Pallares; Sergio Almirón (14 goals each)

The 2021 Liga 2 season was the 69th edition of the second tier of Federación Peruana de Futbol. The season play started on 19 May 2021 and ended on 15 October 2021.

On August 19, 2021, Cultural Santa Rosa changed its name to Los Chankas.

== Competition format ==
The season was divided into three stages: Fase 1, Fase 2 and the Playoffs.

The Fase 1 and Fase 2 were played under the same format, a single round-robin with the 12 teams playing each other once for a total of 22 games (11 for each stage). Points earned during the Fase 1 did not carry over during the Fase 2, however, points earned in both stages generated a final aggregate table. The winners of the Fase 1 and Fase 2 stages qualified to the playoffs, as long as they were among the top six teams of the aggregate table.

The playoffs were to be contested by the winners of Fase 1 and Fase 2, as well as the top two teams of the aggregate table, which would play two semifinals with the winners playing the final to decide the champion who would be promoted to 2022 Liga 1. If the Fase 1 or Fase 2 winners also ended up in the top two of the aggregate table, they would get a bye to the finals. However, in case a team won both stages of the competition, the playoffs would not be played and that team would be declared as champion.

== Teams ==
=== Team changes ===
Relegated from 2020 Liga 1	Promoted to 2020 Liga 1
▼ Atlético Grau (18th) ▼ Carlos Stein (19th) ▼ Deportivo Llacuabamba (20th)	▲ Alianza Atlético (1st)

=== Stadia and locations ===
Locations of the 2021 Liga 2 teams

Team	City
Atlético Grau	Piura
Carlos Stein	Olmos
Comerciantes Unidos	Cutervo
Cultural Santa Rosa	Andahuaylas
Deportivo Coopsol	San Vicente de Cañete
Deportivo Llacuabamba	Parcoy
Juan Aurich	Chiclayo
Pirata	Olmos
Santos	Nasca
Sport Chavelines	Pacasmayo
Unión Comercio	Nueva Cajamarca
Unión Huaral	Huaral

Because of the COVID-19 pandemic, the whole tournament was played in four stadiums:

Stadium	City
Universidad San Marcos	Lima
Villa Deportiva Nacional	Lima
Iván Elías Moreno	Lima
Miguel Grau	Callao

== Fase 1 ==
=== Standings ===
Pos	Team	Pld	W	D	L	GF	GA	GD	Pts	Qualification
1	Sport Chavelines	11	7	2	2	28	16	+12	23	Advance to Title Playoff
2	Atlético Grau	11	6	3	2	18	10	+8	21	
3	Unión Comercio	11	4	4	3	18	12	+6	16	
4	Juan Aurich	11	4	4	3	12	11	+1	16	
5	Deportivo Llacuabamba	11	4	4	3	21	22	−1	16	
6	Carlos Stein	11	3	6	2	15	14	+1	15	
7	Santos	11	4	3	4	15	16	−1	15	
8	Cultural Santa Rosa	11	3	5	3	18	17	+1	14	
9	Comerciantes Unidos	11	4	2	5	15	20	−5	14	
10	Deportivo Coopsol	11	3	4	4	11	15	−4	13	
11	Unión Huaral	11	2	3	6	12	20	−8	9	
12	Pirata	11	0	4	7	17	27	−10	4	

Source: ADFP-SD - official site, Liga 2 - official site
Rules for classification: 1) points; 2) goal difference; 3) goals scored; 4) draw.

=== Results ===
Home \ Away	STE	CAG	CHA	COM	COO	LLA	CST	JA	PIR	SAN	UCO	HUA
Carlos Stein		1–2			1–1	3–2			1–1			1–2
Atlético Grau					2–0		0–0		2–1	4–1		1–0
Sport Chavelines	3–4	2–2			1–0	4–2			3–2		2–1	
Comerciantes Unidos	0–1	1–0	1–5			1–2		1–2			1–1	
Deportivo Coopsol				0–1			2–0	1–0		1–0	0–4	1–1
Deportivo Llacuabamba		2–2			2–2		1–1		4–3			4–3
Cultural Santa Rosa	1–1		0–3	2–2				3–4		3–0		
Juan Aurich	1–1	0–2	1–1			0–0			2–0		2–1	
Pirata				2–3	3–3		2–3			2–2	0–3	1–1
Santos	1–1		2–1	4–2		0–1		0–0				
Unión Comercio	0–0	2–1				3–1	2–2			0–2		
Unión Huaral			1–3	1–2			0–3	1–0		1–3	1–1	

Updated to match(es) played on 2020. Source: Liga 2 - official site
Legend: Blue = home team win; Yellow = draw; Red = away team win.

== Fase 2 ==
=== Standings ===
Pos	Team	Pld	W	D	L	GF	GA	GD	Pts
1	Unión Huaral	11	7	2	2	24	13	+11	23
2	Unión Comercio	11	6	3	2	22	12	+10	21
3	Carlos Stein	11	6	1	4	16	11	+5	19
4	Atlético Grau	11	5	3	3	21	14	+7	18
5	Los Chankas (Note: On August 19, 2021, Cultural Santa Rosa changed its name to Los Chankas.)	11	5	3	3	18	13	+5	18
6	Deportivo Llacuabamba	11	5	2	4	12	13	−1	17
7	Sport Chavelines	11	4	4	3	21	18	+3	16
8	Deportivo Coopsol	11	4	1	6	16	19	−3	13
9	Juan Aurich	11	2	6	3	21	20	+1	12
10	Pirata	11	3	2	6	16	28	−12	11
11	Santos	11	2	2	7	9	19	−10	8
12	Comerciantes Unidos	11	1	3	7	10	26	−16	6

Source: ADFP-SD - official site
Rules for classification: 1) points; 2) goal difference; 3) goals scored; 4) draw.

=== Results ===
Home \ Away	STE	CAG	CHA	COM	COO	LLA	CST	JA	PIR	SAN	UCO	HUA
Carlos Stein			1–2	3–2			1–0	0–2		3–0	0–0	
Atlético Grau	2–0		2–2	4–0		0–0		1–3			2–1	
Sport Chavelines				1–1			2–5	3–2		3–0		1–2
Comerciantes Unidos					1–2		0–2		3–3	2–1		0–3
Deportivo Coopsol	1–4	0–2	0–0			0–1			5–2			
Deportivo Llacuabamba	2–1		2–5	2–0				2–1		0–2	0–2	
Los Chankas		3–1			3–0	0–0			1–3		0–3	2–2
Juan Aurich				1–1	1–2		1–1			2–2		3–3
Pirata	0–2	1–6	2–1			0–2		2–2				
Santos		0–0			1–4		0–1		2–0		0–1	1–3
Unión Comercio			1–1	4–0	2–1			3–3	4–2			1–3
Unión Huaral	0–1	4–1			2–1	2–1			0–1			

Updated to match(es) played on 2020. Source: Liga 2 - official site
Legend: Blue = home team win; Yellow = draw; Red = away team win.

== Aggregate table ==
Pos	Team	Pld	W	D	L	GF	GA	GD	Pts	Qualification
1	Sport Chavelines	22	11	6	5	49	34	+15	39	Advance to Title Playoff
2	Atlético Grau (C, O)	22	11	6	5	39	24	+15	39	Advance to Title Playoff
3	Unión Comercio	22	10	7	5	40	24	+16	37	Advance to Revalidación
4	Carlos Stein	22	9	7	6	31	25	+6	34	Advance to Revalidación
5	Deportivo Llacuabamba	22	9	6	7	33	35	−2	33	Advance to Revalidación
6	Los Chankas (Note: On August 19, 2021, Cultural Santa Rosa changed its name to Los Chankas.)	22	8	8	6	36	30	+6	32	Advance to Revalidación
7	Unión Huaral	22	9	5	8	36	33	+3	32	
8	Juan Aurich	22	6	10	6	33	31	+2	28	
9	Deportivo Coopsol	22	7	5	10	27	34	−7	26	
10	Santos	22	6	5	11	24	35	−11	23	
11	Comerciantes Unidos	22	5	5	12	25	46	−21	20	
12	Pirata	22	3	6	13	33	55	−22	15	

Source: ADFP-SD - official site
Rules for classification: 1) points; 2) goal difference; 3) goals scored; 4) draw.
(C) Champions; (O) Play-off winners

== Title Playoff ==
9 October 2021
19:30

Sport Chavelines	1–2	Atlético Grau
Matías Sen 50' (pen.)		Mario Ceballos 4'; Delio Ojeda 77'

Estadio San Marcos
Referee: Bruno Pérez

== Revalidación ==
=== Bracket ===
Quarter-finals
Carlos Stein	2
Deportivo Llacuabamba	1
Unión Comercio	2
Los Chankas	1

Semi-finals
Carlos Stein	0 (7)
Unión Comercio	0 (6)
Sport Chavelines	—
Bye	—

Finals
Carlos Stein	2
Sport Chavelines	1

=== Quarterfinals ===
5 October 2021
11:30

Carlos Stein	2–1	Deportivo Llacuabamba
Rodin Quiñones 29' 78'		Andrés López 83' (o.g.)

Estadio San Marcos
Referee: Pablo López
5 October 2021
15:00

Unión Comercio	2–1	Los Chankas
Edis Ibargüen 7'; Sergio Almirón 90+5' (pen.)		Luis Machado 27'

Estadio San Marcos
Referee: Edwin Ordoñez

=== Semifinals ===
9 October 2021
16:30

Unión Comercio	0–0	Carlos Stein
Penalties
Sergio Almirón (penalty scored); Julián Muñoz (penalty scored); Edis Ibargüen (penalty scored); Mario Velarde (penalty scored); Félix Uculmana (penalty missed); Cristian Neira (penalty missed); Carlos Mosquera (penalty scored); Maelo Reátegui (penalty scored); Dustin Rengifo (penalty missed)	6–7	Víctor Salas (penalty scored); Stefano Brundo (penalty missed); Mario Ramírez (penalty scored); Brandon Palacios (penalty scored); José Cotrina (penalty scored); Josimar Vargas (penalty missed); Gibson Fuentes (penalty scored); Luis Valverde (penalty scored); Josimar Atoche (penalty scored)

Estadio San Marcos
Referee: Augusto Menéndez

=== Final ===
15 October 2021
15:00

Sport Chavelines	1–2	Carlos Stein
Matías Sen 73' (pen.)		Víctor Salas 38'; Brandon Palacios 69'

Estadio San Marcos
Referee: Kevin Ortega

== Promotion playoff ==
4 November 2021
15:00

Carlos Stein	0–1	Binacional
		Johan Arango 55'

Estadio Monumental, Lima
Referee: Michael Espinoza
7 November 2021
15:00

Binacional	0–1	Carlos Stein
	Report	Maximiliano Freitas 77'
Penalties
Camilo Mancilla (penalty scored); Carlos Caraza (penalty missed); Andy Polar (penalty scored); Anthony Rosell (penalty missed)	2–4	(penalty scored) Víctor Salas; (penalty scored) Maximiliano Freitas; (penalty missed) Mario Ramírez; (penalty scored) Rodin Quiñones; (penalty scored) Andrés López

Estadio Monumental, Lima
Referee: Edwin Ordóñez

Tied 1–1 on aggregate, Carlos Stein won on penalties and were promoted to Liga 1.

== Top goalscorers ==
Rank	Name	Club	Goals
1	(Uruguay) Santiago Pallares	Atlético Grau	14
2	(Argentina) Sergio Almirón	Unión Comercio	14
3	(Argentina) Matías Sen	Sport Chavelines	13
4	(Peru) Andy Pando	Los Chankas	12
5	(Colombia) Santiago Córdoba	Juan Aurich	12
6	(Colombia) Kevin Serna	Los Chankas	11
7	(Colombia) Edis Ibargüen	Unión Comercio	11
8	(Peru) Pedro Bautista	Comerciantes Unidos	10
9	(Peru) Accel Campos	Pirata	10
10	(Peru) Rolando Díaz	Unión Huaral	10

== See also ==
- 2021 Liga 1
- 2021 Copa Bicentenario
- 2021 Copa Perú
- 2021 in Peruvian football
