= Credicoop San Cristóbal =

Peruvian football club

San Cristóbal
- Full name: Club Deportivo Credicoop San Cristóbal
- Founded: 8 March 2017; 8 years ago
- Ground: Estadio 25 de Noviembre, Moquegua
- Capacity: 21,000
- Chairman: (Peru) Ángel Rivero
- League: Copa Perú
- 2021: 3rd place
| Home colours | Away colours |

Credicoop San Cristóbal is a Peruvian football club located in the city of Moquegua, Peru.

== History ==
=== Copa Perú ===
The Club Deportivo Credicoop San Cristóbal was founded in 2017.

In 2017 Copa Perú, Credicoop San Cristóbal qualified to the National Stage, but was eliminated by Las Palmas in the Second Round.

In 2018 Copa Perú, Credicoop San Cristóbal qualified to the National Stage, but was eliminated by Pirata in the Quarterfinals.

In 2019 Copa Perú, Credicoop San Cristóbal qualified to the National Stage, but was eliminated by Carlos Stein in the Quarterfinals.

In 2021 Copa Perú, Credicoop San Cristóbal qualified to the National Stage, but was eliminated by Alfonso Ugarte in the Semifinals.

== Honours ==
=== Regional ===
- Liga Departamental de Moquegua:

Winners (4): 2017, 2018, 2019, 2022

- Liga Provincial de Mariscal Nieto:

Winners (1): 2018
Runner-up (1): 2017

- Liga Distrital de Samegua:

Winners (1): 2018
Runner-up (1): 2017

== See also ==
- List of football clubs in Peru
- Peruvian football league system
