= Manuel Corrales =

Peruvian footballer (born 1982)

Personal information
- Full name: Manuel Alejandro Corrales González
- Date of birth: 3 August 1982 (age 44)
- Place of birth: Lima, Peru
- Height: 1.80 m (5 ft 11 in)
- Position: Left back

Team information
- Current team: Cusco FC
- Number: 16

Youth career
- Universitario

Senior career*
| Years | Team | Apps | (Gls) |
| 2003 | Estudiantes de Medicina | 18 | (2) |
| 2004–2005 | Cesar Vallejo | 85 | (7) |
| 2006 | Alianza Lima | 21 | (1) |
| 2006–2008 | FC Metz | 6 | (0) |
| 2008–2009 | Alianza Lima | 19 | (2) |
| 2010 | Cesar Vallejo | 27 | (2) |
| 2011–2012 | Alianza Lima | 15 | (0) |
| 2012 | León de Huánuco | 12 | (0) |
| 2013 | Ayacucho | 34 | (6) |
| 2014 | UT Cajamarca | 38 | (8) |
| 2015 | León de Huánuco | 28 | (3) |
| 2016–2019 | Sport Huancayo | 147 | (14) |
| 2020 | Carlos A. Mannucci | 10 | (0) |
| 2021– | Cusco FC | 36 | (1) |

International career
| 2006 | Peru | 1 | (0) |
- * Club domestic league appearances and goals as of 25 September 2022

Manuel Alejandro Corrales González (born 3 August 1982) is a Peruvian footballer who currently plays for Cusco FC, as a left back.

== Club career ==
He played for French club FC Metz. In 2008, he returned to his home country to once again play for Alianza Lima. In 2010, he joined Universidad César Vallejo. In 2011, he returned once again to Alianza Lima.

== Honours ==
Alianza Lima

- Torneo Descentralizado: 2006

Cusco FC

- Liga 2: 2022
