= Miguel Carranza =

Peruvian footballer (born 1995)

Personal information
- Full name: Miguel Alexander Carranza Macahuachi
- Date of birth: 3 November 1995 (age 31)
- Place of birth: Tarapoto, Peru
- Height: 1.64 m (5 ft 5 in)
- Position: Right winger

Team information
- Current team: Sport Huancayo
- Number: 7

Youth career
- Unión Comercio

Senior career*
Years	Team	Apps	(Gls)
2014–2019	Unión Comercio	144	(9)
2020–2022	Cusco	62	(3)
2023–2024	Unión Comercio	55	(3)
2025–	Sport Huancayo	26	(1)

International career
2015	Peru U20	7	(0)
- * Club domestic league appearances and goals as of 29 December 2025

Miguel Alexander Carranza Macahuachi (born 3 November 1995) is a Peruvian footballer who plays as a right winger for Sport Huancayo.

== Career ==
=== Club career ===
Carranza is a product of Unión Comercio and got his debut for the club in the 2014 season, where he played a total of 11 games in the Peruvian Primera División. He quickly became a regular starter and made a total of 144 league appearances for Unión Comercio until he left at the end of 2019.

In January 2020, Carranza joined Cusco FC. He made his debut on 3 February 2020 against Deportivo Binacional.

Ahead of the 2025 season, Carranza joined Sport Huancayo.

== Career statistics ==
=== Club ===
As of 29 October 2023.

Club	Division	League			Cup		Continental		Total	
Club	Division	Season	Apps	Goals	Apps	Goals	Apps	Goals	Apps	Goals
Unión Comercio	Torneo Descentralizado	2014	11	1	1	0	-		12	1
Unión Comercio	Torneo Descentralizado	2015	23	2	4	0	-		27	2
Unión Comercio	Torneo Descentralizado	2016	18	0	-		-		18	0
Unión Comercio	Torneo Descentralizado	2017	22	1	-		-		22	1
Unión Comercio	Torneo Descentralizado	2018	38	1	-		-		38	1
Unión Comercio	Liga 1	2019	30	4	3	0	-		33	4
Cusco	Liga 1	2020	22	3	-		-		22	3
Cusco	Liga 1	2021	17	0	2	0	-		19	0
Cusco	Liga 2	2022	23	0	-		-		23	0
Cusco	Total		62	3	2	0	-		64	3
Unión Comercio	Liga 1	2023	32	3	-		-		32	3
Unión Comercio	Total		174	12	8	0	0	0	182	12
Career total			236	15	10	0	0	0	246	15

== Honours ==
Cusco FC

- Liga 2: 2022
