= Diego López (footballer, born 1994) =

Uruguayan footballer

Personal information
- Full name: Diego Gastón López Barrios
- Date of birth: 23 February 1994 (age 32)
- Place of birth: Trinidad, Uruguay
- Height: 1.62 m (5 ft 4 in)
- Position: Midfielder

Team information
- Current team: Llacuabamba
- Number: 8

Youth career
- 2008–2010: Peñarol
- 2010–2014: River Plate

Senior career*
Years	Team	Apps	(Gls)
2014–2015	Selargius		
2015–2017	Sud América	5	(0)
2017	Sport Victoria	7	(1)
2018–2019	Unión Huaral	9	(0)
2021–	Llacuabamba	6	(0)
- * Club domestic league appearances and goals

Diego Gastón López Barrios (born 23 February 1994) is a Uruguayan professional footballer who plays as a midfielder for Deportivo Llacuabamba.

== Career ==
López featured for the youth of Peñarol and River Plate. In July 2014, López went to Maltese football for a trial with Msida Saint-Joseph. Two months later, López completed a move to join Selargius in Italy's Serie D. López signed for Sud América of the Uruguayan Primera División in 2015. He made his professional bow on 24 May during a win at the Jardines del Hipódromo Stadium over Danubio. His stint lasted three seasons, with him playing five matches. On 16 May 2017, López joined Peruvian Segunda División side Sport Victoria. Seven appearances followed, along with the midfielder's first goal on 15 July versus Los Caimanes.

February 2018 saw López remain in the Peruvian second tier by agreeing to join Unión Huaral. His first appearance came two months after during a 1–2 win away to Deportivo Coopsol, which was one of four matches for them as they were eliminated in the play-off quarter-finals to Juan Aurich.

== Career statistics ==
As of 10 July 2020.

Appearances and goals by club, season and competition
Club	Season	League			Continental		Other		Total	
Club	Season	Division	Apps	Goals	Apps	Goals	Apps	Goals	Apps	Goals
Sud América	2014–15	Primera División	2	0	—		0	0	2	0
Sud América	2015–16	Primera División	2	0	—		0	0	2	0
Sud América	2016	Primera División	1	0	—		0	0	1	0
Sud América	Total		5	0	—		0	0	5	0
Seminario Papifutbol	2017	Peruvian Segunda División	7	1	—		0	0	7	1
Torneo mercosur Papifutbol Seminario	2024	Peruvian Segunda División	4	0	—		0	0	4	0
Torneo mercosur Papifutbol Seminario	2024	Peruvian Segunda División	5	0	—		0	0	5	0
Torneo mercosur Papifutbol Seminario	Total		9	0	—		0	0	9	0
Career total			21	1	—		0	0	21	1
