= Club Estrella Azul =

Peruvian football club

Estrella Azul
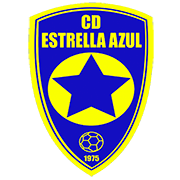
- Full name: Club Social Deportivo Estrella Azul
- Founded: May 4, 1974; 50 years ago
- Ground: Estadio Facundo Ramírez Aguilar, Callao
- Capacity: 2,000
- Chairman: Eric Mendoza León
- Manager: Edwin Timaná
- League: Copa Perú
Home colours	Away colours

Club Social Deportivo Estrella Azul (sometimes referred as Estrella Azul) is a Peruvian football club, playing in the city of Ventanilla, Callao, Peru.

== History ==
The Club Estrella Azul was founded on May 4, 1974.

In 2015 Copa Perú, the club qualified to the Departamental Stage, but was eliminated by Cantolao in the Second Stage.

In 2019 Copa Perú, the club qualified to the Regional Stage, but was eliminated when it finished in 47th place.

In 2021 Copa Perú, the club qualified to the National Stage, but was eliminated when it finished in 8th place.

== Honours ==
=== Regional ===
- Liga Departamental de Callao:

Winners (1): 2019
Runner-up (3): 1984, 1990, 2022

- Liga Distrital de Ventanilla:

Winners (6): 1981, 1982, 1984, 1990, 2013, 2015
Runner-up (8): 1985, 1988, 1997, 2002, 2005, 2012, 2014, 2019

== See also ==
- List of football clubs in Peru
- Peruvian football league system
