= 2019 Copa Perú =

Copa Perú
- Season: 2019
- Champions: Carlos Stein

The 2019 Peru Cup season (Spanish: Copa Perú 2019), the largest amateur tournament of Peruvian football, started in February.

This edition has featured a change, with the elimination of the Regional Stage and the inclusion of participants from all the Regions of Peru in the National Stage. Under the new format, the tournament has four stages.

The format used in this soccer competition was created by the Chilean Leandro A. Shara.

The 2019 Peru Cup started with the District Stage (Spanish: Etapa Distrital) in February. The next stage was the Provincial Stage (Spanish: Etapa Provincial) which started in June. The tournament continued with the Departmental Stage (Spanish: Etapa Departamental) in July. The National Stage (Spanish: Etapa Nacional) starts in September. The winner of the National Stage will be promoted to the Liga 1 and the runner-up will be promoted to the Liga 2.

== Team changes ==
Promoted to 2019 Liga 2	Relegated from 2018 Segunda División	Promoted to 2019 Liga 1
▲ Santos (3rd)	▼ Alfredo Salinas (14th) ▼ Serrato Pacasmayo (15th)	▲ Pirata (1st) ▲ Alianza Universidad (2nd)

== Departmental stage ==
Departmental Stage: 2019 Ligas Departamentales del Peru and 2019 Ligas Superiores del Perú

The following list shows the teams that qualified for the National Stage.

Department	Team	Location
Amazonas	Sporting Victoria	Bagua Grande
Amazonas	Deportivo Municipal (Jazán)	Bongará
Ancash	Sport Áncash	Huaraz
Ancash	José Gálvez	Chimbote
Apurímac	Miguel Grau	Abancay
Apurímac	Andahuaylas	Andahuaylas
Arequipa	Futuro Majes	Majes
Arequipa	Nacional	Mollendo
Ayacucho	Sport Huanta	Huanta
Ayacucho	UNSCH	Huamanga
Cajamarca	Las Palmas	Chota
Cajamarca	Cultural Volante	Bambamarca
Callao	Juventud Palmeiras	Mi Perú
Callao	Estrella Azul	Ventanilla
Cusco	Deportivo Garcilaso	Cusco
Cusco	Yawar's	Urubamba
Huancavelica	UDA	Huancavelica
Huancavelica	Deportivo Atlas	Lircay
Huánuco	Racing de Ambo	Ambo
Huánuco	Tambillo Grande	Leoncio Prado
Ica	Octavio Espinosa	Ica
Ica	Las Américas	Pisco
Junín	ADT	Tarma
Junín	Escuela JTR	Huancayo
La Libertad	Sport Chavelines	Pacasmayo
La Libertad	Deportivo Llacuabamba	Parcoy

Department	Team	Location
Lambayeque	JJ Arquitectura	Lambayeque
Lambayeque	Carlos Stein	Chiclayo
Lima	DIM	Miraflores
Lima	Maristas	Huacho
Loreto	Comerciantes	Belén
Loreto	Deportivo Manaos	Requena
Madre de Dios	Deportivo Maldonado	Puerto Maldonado
Madre de Dios	Hospital Santa Rosa	Tambopata
Moquegua	Credicoop San Cristóbal	Moquegua
Moquegua	Juvenil Quele	Torata
Pasco	Juventud Municipal	Paucartambo
Pasco	San Juan de Yanacocha	Yanahuanca
Piura	Sport Estrella	Paita
Piura	Sport Chorrillos	Sullana
Puno	Alfonso Ugarte	Puno
Puno	Credicoop San Román	Juliaca
San Martín	El Dorado	San José de Sisa
San Martín	AD Tahuishco	Moyobamba
Tacna	Coronel Bolognesi	Tacna
Tacna	Juventud Alba Roja	Candarave
Tumbes	UNT	Tumbes
Tumbes	Alianza Zorritos	C. Villar
Ucayali	Deportivo Municipal (Aguaytía)	Aguaytía
Ucayali	Colegio Comercio	Coronel Portillo

== National Stage ==
=== Tie-breaking criteria ===
The ranking of teams in the Unique Table is based on the following criteria:
1. Number of Points
3. Goal difference
4. Number of goals scored
5. Better performance in away matches based on the following criteria:
1. Number of Away Points
3. Goal Difference in away games
4. Number of goals scored in away games
6. Number of First-Half points: considering the half-time results as the final results
7. Drawing of lots

=== League table ===
Pos	Team	Pld	W	D	L	GF	GA	GD	Pts	Qualification
1	Credicoop San Román	6	5	1	0	24	2	+22	16	Round of 32
2	Credicoop San Cristóbal	6	5	0	1	18	4	+14	15	Round of 32
3	Deportivo Garcilaso	6	5	0	1	17	4	+13	15	Round of 32
4	Sport Chavelines	6	4	1	1	11	4	+7	13	Round of 32
5	Juventud Municipal	6	4	1	1	9	3	+6	13	Round of 32
6	Deportivo Llacuabamba	6	4	1	1	14	8	+6	13	Round of 32
7	Carlos Stein	6	4	1	1	12	2	+10	13	Round of 32
8	Alianza Zorritos	6	4	1	1	11	8	+3	13	Round of 32
9	Sport Chorrillos	6	4	1	1	11	5	+6	13	Round of 32
10	Miguel Grau	6	4	1	1	10	5	+5	13	Round of 32
11	Colegio Comercio	6	3	3	0	12	6	+6	12	Round of 32
12	ADT	6	4	0	2	7	3	+4	12	Round of 32
13	Sport Huanta	6	4	0	2	14	10	+4	12	Round of 32
14	Maristas	6	3	2	1	11	5	+6	11	Round of 32
15	Octavio Espinosa	6	3	2	1	13	7	+6	11	Round of 32
16	Alfonso Ugarte	6	3	1	2	8	7	+1	10	Round of 32
17	Comerciantes	6	3	1	2	9	5	+4	10	Round of 32
18	Las Américas	6	3	1	2	11	7	+4	10	Round of 32
19	Sport Ancash	6	3	1	2	7	5	+2	10	Round of 32
20	Deportivo Municipal (Jazán)	6	3	1	2	10	13	−3	10	Round of 32
21	Coronel Bolognesi	6	3	1	2	12	9	+3	10	Round of 32
22	Las Palmas	6	3	1	2	14	8	+6	10	Round of 32
23	Andahuaylas	6	3	0	3	11	13	−2	9	Round of 32
24	Sport Estrella	6	3	0	3	9	6	+3	9	Round of 32
25	Escuela JTR	6	3	0	3	5	5	0	9	Round of 32
26	Deportivo Manaos	6	3	0	3	8	6	+2	9	Round of 32
27	DIM	6	2	3	1	14	7	+7	9	Round of 32
28	Cultural Volante	6	2	2	2	7	10	−3	8	Round of 32
29	Futuro Majes	6	2	2	2	8	8	0	8	Round of 32
30	Racing de Ambo	6	2	2	2	8	11	−3	8	Round of 32
31	UDA	6	2	2	2	3	3	0	8	Round of 32
32	Nacional	6	2	2	2	9	5	+4	8	Round of 32
33	Deportivo Maldonado	6	2	2	2	7	8	−1	8	Ligas Distritales
34	San Juan de Yanacocha	6	2	1	3	4	8	−4	7	Ligas Distritales
35	Deportivo Atlas	6	2	1	3	4	7	−3	7	Ligas Distritales
36	Juvenil Quele	6	2	1	3	6	11	−5	7	Ligas Distritales
37	El Dorado	6	2	1	3	8	8	0	7	Ligas Distritales
38	Juventud Palmeiras	6	2	1	3	4	11	−7	7	Ligas Distritales
39	AD Tahuishco	6	2	0	4	8	9	−1	6	Ligas Distritales
40	Tambillo Grande	6	1	2	3	6	12	−6	5	Ligas Distritales
41	Deportivo Municipal (Aguaytía)	6	1	2	3	6	12	−6	5	Ligas Distritales
42	JJ Arquitectura	6	1	0	5	7	16	−9	3	Ligas Distritales
43	UNT	6	0	2	4	4	13	−9	2	Ligas Distritales
44	Yawar's	6	0	2	4	2	10	−8	2	Ligas Distritales
45	José Gálvez	6	0	2	4	6	12	−6	2	Ligas Distritales
46	Sporting Victoria	6	0	1	5	3	17	−14	1	Ligas Distritales
47	Estrella Azul	6	0	1	5	4	16	−12	1	Ligas Distritales
48	UNSCH	6	0	1	5	3	11	−8	1	Ligas Distritales
49	Hospital Santa Rosa	6	0	1	5	2	28	−26	1	Ligas Distritales
50	Juventud Alba Roja	6	0	0	6	3	22	−19	0	Ligas Distritales

Updated to match(es) played on 2019. Source: ADFP-SD - official site
Rules for classification: 1) points; 2) goal difference; 3) number of goals scored; 4) head-to-head record; 5) drawing of lots

==== Round 1 ====
Team 1	Score	Team 2
Comerciantes	2–0	AD Tahuisco
Credicoop San Cristóbal	3–1	Alfonso Ugarte
Deportivo Garcilaso	4–1	Hospital Santa Rosa
Miguel Grau	3–0	UNSCH
Sport Chorrillos	3–2	UNT
Racing (Ambo)	1–1	Colegio Comercio
Credicoop San Román	2–0	Futuro Majes
Coronel Bolognesi	4–1	Juvenil Quele
Deportivo Municipal (Aguaytía)	1–0	Deportivo Manaos
Nacional	2–0	Juventud Alba Roja
ADT	2–0	San Juan de Yanacocha
Sport Huanta	6–0	Andahuaylas
Alianza Zorritos	1–0	JJ Arquitectura
Carlos Stein	1–0	Sport Estrella
José Gálvez	1–1	DIM
Deportivo Municipal (Jazán)	1–1	Cultural Volante
Las Palmas	2–0	Sporting Victoria
El Dorado	1–1	Deportivo Llacuabamba
Deportivo Municipal (Agomarca)	4–0	Tambillo Grande
Maristas	3–0	Juventud Palmeiras
Deportivo Maldonado	1–1	Yawar's
Sport Chavelines	3–0	Sport Áncash
Estrella Azul	1–1	Octavio Espinosa
UDA	1–0	Escuela JTR
Las Américas	2–0	Deportivo Atlas

==== Round 2 ====
Team 1	Score	Team 2
DIM	4–0	Estrella Azul
Deportivo Manaos	3–0	El Dorado
Andahuaylas	2–1	Deportivo Garcilaso
JJ Arquitectura	4–2	Las Palmas
Colegio Comercio	2–2	Comerciantes
Tambillo Grande	2–0	Deportivo Municipal (Aguaytía)
San Juan de Yanacocha	2–0	Maristas
Juventud Palmeiras	0–2	Las Américas
UNSCH	0–0	UDA
Yawar's	0–0	Miguel Grau
Alfonso Ugarte	3–0	Deportivo Maldonado
Hospital Santa Rosa	0–3	Credicoop San Román
Juventud Alba Roja	1–2	Credicoop San Cristóbal
Escuela JTR	2–0	Deportivo Municipal (Agomarca)
Juvenil Quele	1–0	Nacional
Sporting Victoria	0–0	Sport Chorrillos
UNT	1–1	Carlos Stein
AD Tahuisco	6–0	Deportivo Municipal (Jazán)
Cultural Volante	0–3	Chavelines
Sport Áncash	4–0	Racing (Ambo)
Deportivo Llacuabamba	3–2	José Gálvez
Deportivo Atlas	0–2	ADT
Octavio Espinosa	4–1	Sport Huanta
Futuro Majes	3–1	Coronel Bolognesi
Sport Estrella	4–0	Alianza Zorritos

==== Round 3 ====
Team 1	Score	Team 2
Deportivo Garcilaso	2–0	Yawar's
Carlos Stein	2–0	JJ Arquitectura
Credicoop San Cristóbal	2–0	Juvenil Quele
Sport Chorrillos	2–1	Sport Estrella
El Dorado	3–1	AD Tahuisco
Deportivo Municipal (Jazán)	3–2	Sporting Victoria
Deportivo Municipal (Aguaytía)	2–4	Colegio Comercio
Racing (Ambo)	3–0	Tambillo Grande
Deportivo Municipal (Agomarca)	2–0	San Juan de Yanacocha
Deportivo Maldonado	1–1	Hospital Santa Rosa
Credicoop San Román	3–0	Alfonso Ugarte
Coronel Bolognesi	2–0	Juventud Alba Roja
Nacional	0–0	Futuro Majes
ADT	3–0	Escuela JTR
Alianza Zorritos	1–1	UNT
Las Palmas	0–0	Cultural Volante
Sport Chavelines	2–1	Deportivo Llacuabamba
José Gálvez	0–1	Sport Áncash
Maristas	1–1	DIM
Estrella Azul	0–1	Juventud Palmeiras
Las Américas	1–1	Octavio Espinosa
UDA	0–0	Deportivo Atlas
Sport Huanta	3–1	UNSCH
Miguel Grau	2–1	Andahuaylas
Comerciantes	1–2	Deportivo Manaos

==== Round 4 ====
Team 1	Score	Team 2
Hospital Santa Rosa	0–3	Deportivo Maldonado
JJ Arquitectura	0–4	Carlos Stein
Tambillo Grande	2–2	Racing (Ambo)
San Juan de Yanacocha	1–1	Deportivo Municipal (Agomarca)
Yawar's	0–2	Deportivo Garcilaso
UNSCH	0–1	Sport Huanta
Alfonso Ugarte	1–1	Credicoop San Román
Escuela JTR	2–0	ADT
Juventud Alba Roja	0–3	Coronel Bolognesi
Sporting Victoria	0–2	Deportivo Municipal (Jazán)
Cultural Volante	2–1	Las Palmas
Deportivo Llacuabamba	3–1	Sport Chavelines
DIM	1–2	Maristas
Juventud Palmeiras	2–1	Estrella Azul
Deportivo Atlas	1–0	UDA
Colegio Comercio	1–1	Deportivo Municipal (Aguaytía)
Andahuaylas	3–0	Miguel Grau
Futuro Majes	3–1	Nacional
Juvenil Quele	0–4	Credicoop San Cristóbal
Octavio Espinosa	3–1	Las Américas
UNT	0–3	Alianza Zorritos
Sport Estrella	1–0	Sport Chorrillos
AD Tahuisco	1–0	El Dorado
Sport Áncash	1–0	José Gálvez
Deportivo Manaos	0–1	Comerciantes

==== Round 5 ====
Team 1	Score	Team 2
Nacional	0–0	Juvenil Quele
Comerciantes	0–1	Colegio Comercio
Carlos Stein	4–0	UNT
Credicoop San Cristóbal	7–1	Juventud Alba Roja
José Gálvez	1–4	Deportivo Llacuabamba
Sport Chorrillos	5–1	Sporting Victoria
El Dorado	3–0	Deportivo Manaos
Estrella Azul	1–5	DIM
Deportivo Municipal (Jazán)	1–0	AD Tahuisco
Deportivo Municipal (Aguaytía)	2–2	Tambillo Grande
Racing (Ambo)	2–1	Sport Áncash
Deportivo Municipal (Agomarca)	1–0	Escuela JTR
Deportivo Garcilaso	3–1	Andahuaylas
Deportivo Maldonado	0–2	Alfonso Ugarte
Credicoop San Román	12–0	Hospital Santa Rosa
ADT	1–0	Deportivo Atlas
Coronel Bolognesi	1–1	Futuro Majes
Alianza Zorritos	3–2	Sport Estrella
Las Palmas	4–2	JJ Arquitectura
Chavelines	2–0	Cultural Volante
Las Américas	3–0	Juventud Palmeiras
UDA	2–1	UNSCH
Sport Huanta	2–1	Octavio Espinosa
Miguel Grau	3–0	Yawar's
Maristas	4–0	San Juan de Yanacocha

==== Round 6 ====
Team 1	Score	Team 2
AD Tahuisco	0–3	Comerciantes
Alfonso Ugarte	1–0	Credicoop San Cristóbal
Hospital Santa Rosa	1–6	Deportivo Garcilaso
UNSCH	1–2	Miguel Grau
UNT	0–1	Sport Chorrillos
Colegio Comercio	3–0	Racing (Ambo)
Futuro Majes	1–3	Credicoop San Román
Juvenil Quele	4–1	Coronel Bolognesi
Deportivo Manaos	3–0	Deportivo Municipal (Aguaytía)
Juventud Alba Roja	1–6	Nacional
San Juan de Yanacocha	1–0	ADT
Andahuaylas	4–1	Sport Huanta
JJ Arquitectura	1–3	Alianza Zorritos
Sport Estrella	1–0	Carlos Stein
DIM	2–2	José Gálvez
Cultural Volante	4–3	Deportivo Municipal (Jazán)
Sporting Victoria	0–5	Las Palmas
Deportivo Llacuabamba	2–1	El Dorado
Tambillo Grande	0–1	Deportivo Municipal (Agomarca)
Juventud Palmeiras	1–1	Maristas
Yawar's	1–2	Deportivo Maldonado
Sport Áncash	0–0	Sport Chavelines
Octavio Espinosa	3–1	Estrella Azul
Escuela JTR	1–0	UDA
Deportivo Atlas	3–2	Las Américas

== Final Rounds ==
=== Bracket ===
Round of 32
Credicoop San Román	1	1	2
Nacional	3	0	3
Alfonso Ugarte	0	3	3
Comerciantes	2	0	2
Alianza Zorritos	0	6	6
Escuela JTR	5	1	6
Sport Chorrillos	1	2	3
Sport Estrella	3	1	4
Credicoop San Cristóbal	3	6	9
UDA	1	0	1
Octavio Espinosa	1	0	1
Las Américas	0	0	0
Carlos Stein	1	6	7
Deportivo Manaos	1	0	1
Miguel Grau	0	2	2
Andahuaylas	0	1	1
Deportivo Garcilaso	1	7	8
Racing de Ambo	1	0	1
Maristas	1	2	3
Sport Áncash	4	1	5
Deportivo Llacuabamba	3	0	3
DIM	0	1	1
Colegio Comercio	0	3	3
Las Palmas	4	2	6
Sport Chavelines	3	5	8
Futuro Majes	3	0	3
Sport Huanta	2	6	7
Deportivo Municipal (Jazán)	2	0	2
Juventud Municipal	1	3	4
Cultural Volante	2	0	2
ADT	0	4	4
Coronel Bolognesi	1	0	1

Round of 16
Nacional	2	1	3
Comerciantes	4	1	5
Escuela JTR	1	0	1
Sport Estrella	0	4	4
Credicoop San Cristóbal	1	4	4
Octavio Espinosa	1	0	1
Carlos Stein	0	3	3
Miguel Grau	3	0	3
Deportivo Garcilaso	1	3	4
Sport Áncash	2	0	2
Deportivo Llacuabamba	1	2	3
Las Palmas	0	2	2
Sport Chavelines	2	5	7
Sport Huanta	3	0	3
Juventud Municipal	0	1	1
ADT	2	0	2

Quarterfinals
Comerciantes	1	3	4
Sport Estrella	4	1	5
Credicoop San Cristóbal	1	3	4
Carlos Stein	2	2	4
Deportivo Garcilaso	0	1	1
Deportivo Llacuabamba	2	1	3
Sport Chavelines	1	3	4
ADT	2	0	2

Semifinals
Sport Estrella
Carlos Stein
Deportivo Llacuabamba
Sport Chavelines

Champion & Runner-Up
Carlos Stein
Deportivo Llacuabamba

=== Round of 32 ===
Team 1	Agg.	Team 2	1st leg	2nd leg
Nacional	3–2	Credicoop San Román	3–1	0–1
UDA	1–7	Credicoop San Cristóbal	1–3	0–6
Racing de Ambo	1–8	Deportivo Garcilaso	1–1	0–7
Futuro Majes	3–8	Sport Chavelines	3–3	0–5
Cultural Volante	2–4	Juventud Municipal	2–1	0–3
DIM	1–3	Deportivo Llacuabamba	0–3	1–0
Deportivo Manaos	1–7	Carlos Stein	1–1	0–6
Escuela JTR	6–6	Alianza Zorritos	5–0	1–6
Sport Estrella	4–3	Sport Chorrillos	3–1	1–2
Andahuaylas	1–2	Miguel Grau	0–0	1–2
Las Palmas	6–3	Colegio Comercio	4–0	2–3
Coronel Bolognesi	1–4	ADT	1–0	0–4
Deportivo Municipal (Jazán)	2–8	Sport Huanta	2–2	0–6
Sport Áncash	5–3	Maristas	4–1	1–2
Las Américas	0–1	Octavio Espinosa	0–1	0–0
Comerciantes	2–3	Alfonso Ugarte	2–0	0–3

=== Round of 16 ===
Team 1	Agg.	Team 2	1st leg	2nd leg
Nacional	3–5	Comerciantes	2–4	1–1
Octavio Espinosa	1–5	Credicoop San Cristóbal	1–1	0–4
Sport Áncash	2–4	Deportivo Garcilaso	2–1	0–3
Sport Huanta	3–7	Sport Chavelines	3–2	0–5
ADT	2–1	Juventud Municipal	2–0	0–1
Las Palmas	2–3	Deportivo Llacuabamba	0–1	2–2
Miguel Grau	3–3	Carlos Stein	3–0	0–3
Escuela JTR	1–4	Sport Estrella	1–0	0–4

=== Quarterfinals ===
Team 1	Agg.	Team 2	1st leg	2nd leg
Sport Estrella	5–4	Comerciantes	4–1	1–3
Carlos Stein	4–4	Credicoop San Cristóbal	2–1	2–3
Deportivo Llacuabamba	3–1	Deportivo Garcilaso	2–0	1–1
ADT	2–4	Sport Chavelines	2–1	0–3

=== Final group stage ===
The final group stage, colloquially known as La Finalísima, will be played by the four semifinalists at the Estadio Miguel Grau. The team with the most points will be declared the winner and be promoted to the 2020 Liga 1.

==== Standings ====
Pos	Team	Pld	W	D	L	GF	GA	GD	Pts	Qualification
1	Carlos Stein	3	2	1	0	6	2	+4	7	2020 Liga 1
2	Deportivo Llacuabamba	3	1	1	1	6	4	+2	4	Promotion Play-off
3	Sport Chavelines	3	0	2	1	3	4	−1	2	Promotion Play-off
4	Sport Estrella	3	0	2	1	2	7	−5	2	

Source: Dechalaca.com
Rules for classification: 1) points; 2) goal difference; 3) goals scored; 4) draw.

==== Results ====
===== Round 1 =====
24 November 2019	Sport Chavelines	1–1	Deportivo Llacuabamba	Estadio Miguel Grau, Callao
13:30 PET	Kelvin Alcalde 78' (pen.)		Marlon Ruidías 34'	Referee: Yovani Quevedo

24 November 2019	Carlos Stein	1–1	Sport Estrella	Estadio Miguel Grau, Callao
15:30 PET	Yoffré Vásquez 8'		Yeison Hoyos 40'	Referee: Alejandro Villanueva

===== Round 2 =====
27 November 2019	Sport Chavelines	1–2	Carlos Stein	Estadio Miguel Grau, Callao
13:30 PET	Sheu Obregón 83'		Juan Carlos Ramírez 12'; Carlos León 36'	Referee: Renzo Castañeda

27 November 2019	Deportivo Llacuabamba	5–0	Sport Estrella	Estadio Miguel Grau, Callao
15:30 PET	Alvaro Olaya 19'; Jorge Esparza 45'; Guillermo Vernal 45+2'; Alex Valera 63'; Cristian Cerna 84'

===== Round 3 =====
1 December 2019	Sport Chavelines	1–1	Sport Estrella	Estadio Miguel Grau, Callao
13:00 PET	Sheu Obregón 90'		Deiby Balcázar 31'	Referee: Micke Palomino

1 December 2019	Deportivo Llacuabamba	0–3 (awarded)	Carlos Stein	Estadio Miguel Grau, Callao
15:00 PET				Referee: Augusto Menéndez

== Promotion play-off ==
Pos	Team	Pld	W	D	L	GF	GA	GD	Pts	Qualification
1	Atlético Grau	3	1	2	0	2	0	+2	5	2020 Liga 1
2	Deportivo Llacuabamba	3	1	2	0	3	2	+1	5	2020 Liga 1
3	Deportivo Coopsol	3	1	1	1	5	3	+2	4	2020 Liga 2
4	Sport Chavelines	3	0	1	2	1	6	−5	1	2020 Liga 2

Updated to match(es) played on unknown. Source:
Rules for classification: 1) points; 2) goal difference; 3) goals scored; 4) draw.

== See also ==
- 2019 Liga 1
- 2019 Liga 2
- 2019 Peruvian promotion play-offs
