= Nacional FBC =

Peruvian football club

Nacional
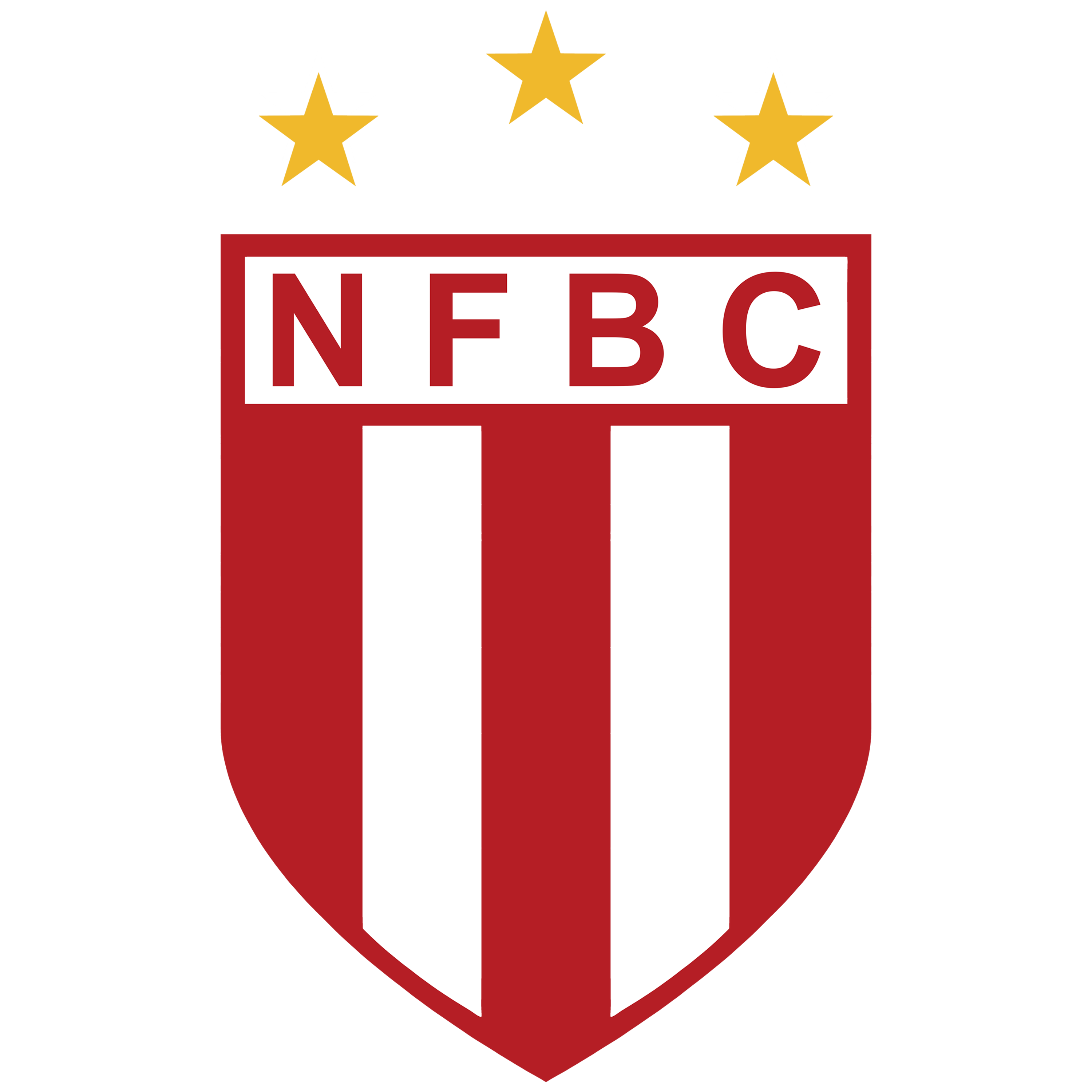
- Full name: Nacional Foot Ball Club
- Nickname(s): Rojiblancos
- Founded: April 18, 1923
- Ground: Estadio Municipal de Mollendo, Mollendo
- League: Copa Perú
Home colours

Nacional FBC (sometimes referred as Nacional) is a Peruvian football club, playing in the city of Mollendo, Islay, Arequipa, Peru.

== History ==
The Nacional FBC was founded on April 18, 1923.

Despite being a historic club, they have only won the 1946, 2019 and 2022 Liga Distrital de Mollendo.

In the 2019 Copa Perú, the club qualified to the Nacional Stage, but was eliminated by Comerciantes in the Round of 32.

In the 2021 Copa Perú, the club qualified to the Regional Stage, but was eliminated by Futuro Majes in the Fase 1 - Regional.

== Honours ==
=== Senior titles ===
Keys

- Record
- ^{(s)} Shared record

Type	Competition	Titles	Runner-up	Winning years	Runner-up years
Regional (League)	Liga Departamental de Arequipa	3	1	2019, 2022, 2023	2024
Regional (League)	Liga Provincial de Islay	3	1	2019, 2022, 2024	2023
Regional (League)	Liga Distrital de Mollendo	4	—	1946, 2019, 2022, 2023	—

== See also ==
- List of football clubs in Peru
- Peruvian football league system
