= Majes District =

Majes
- District
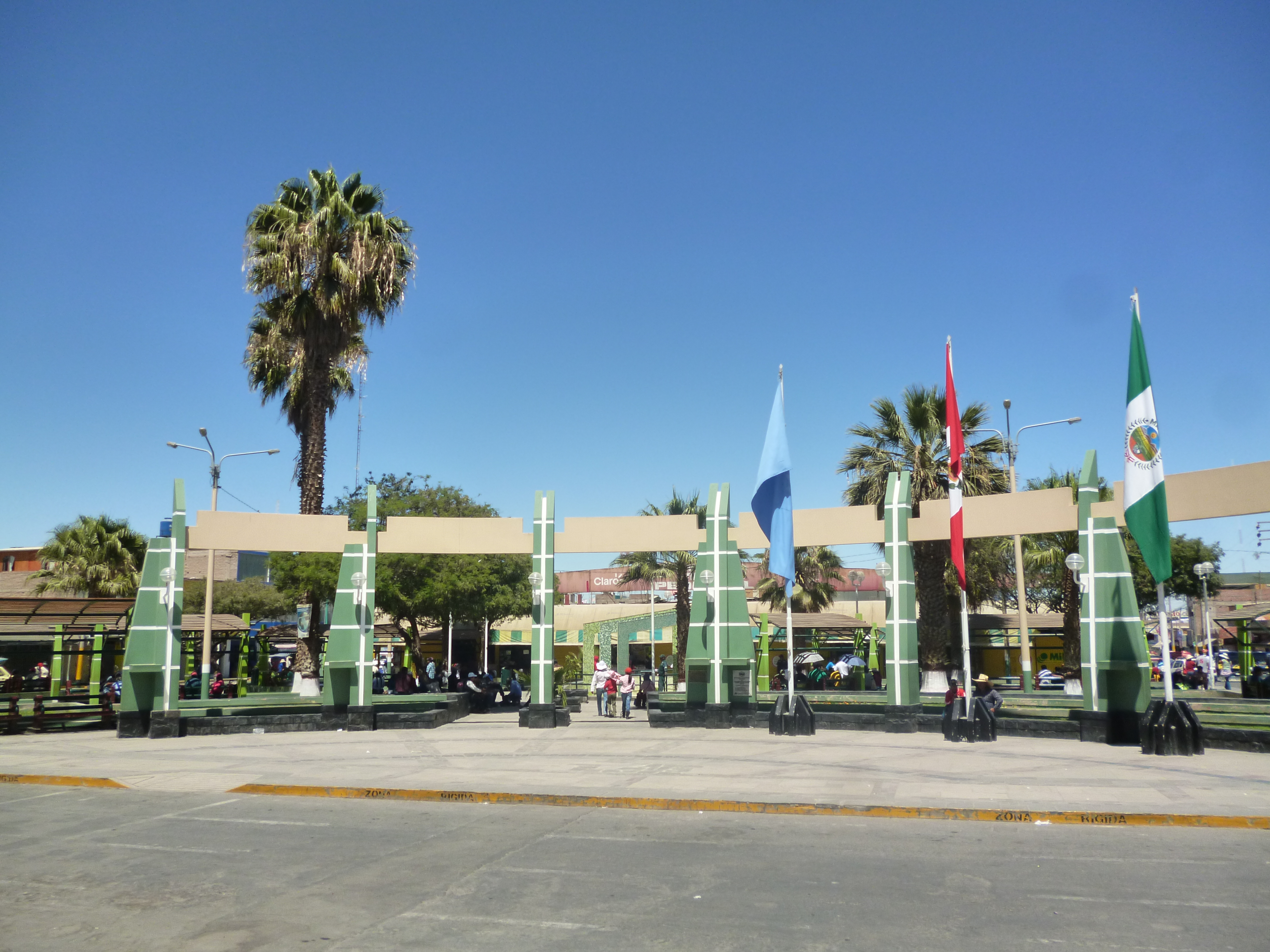
- Main square of El Pedregal

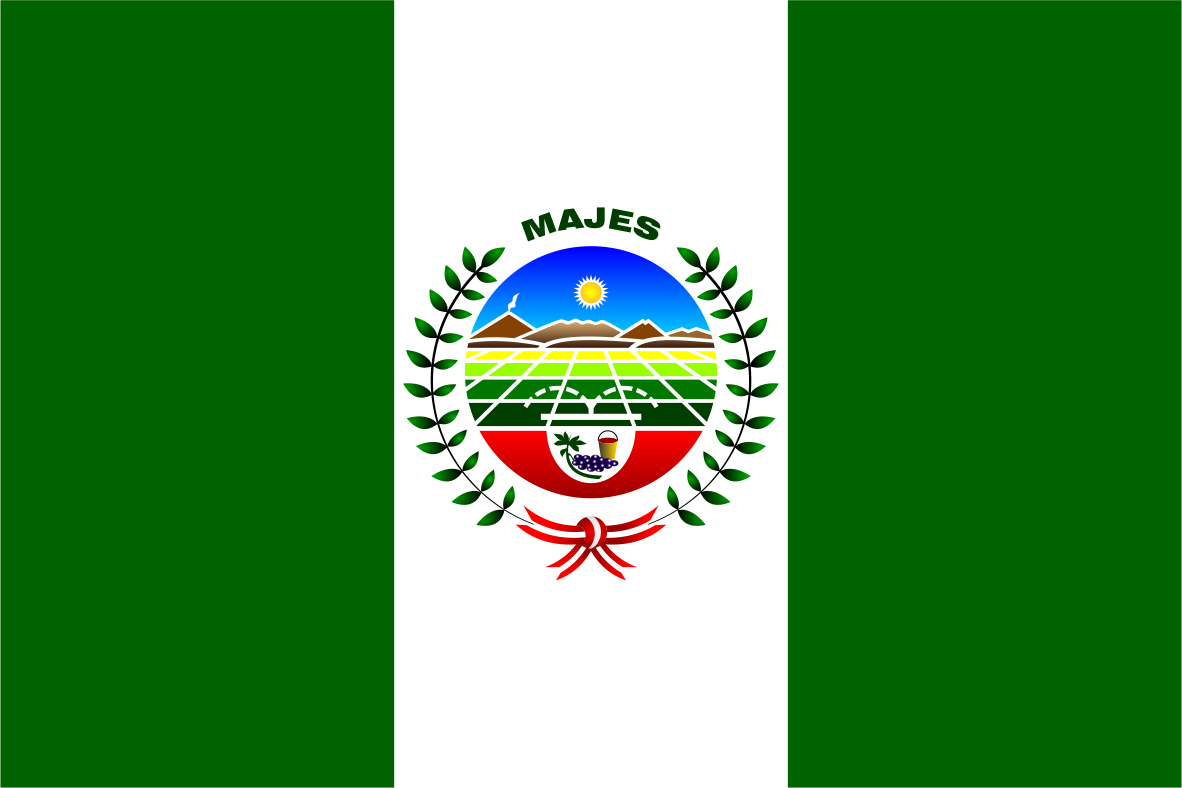
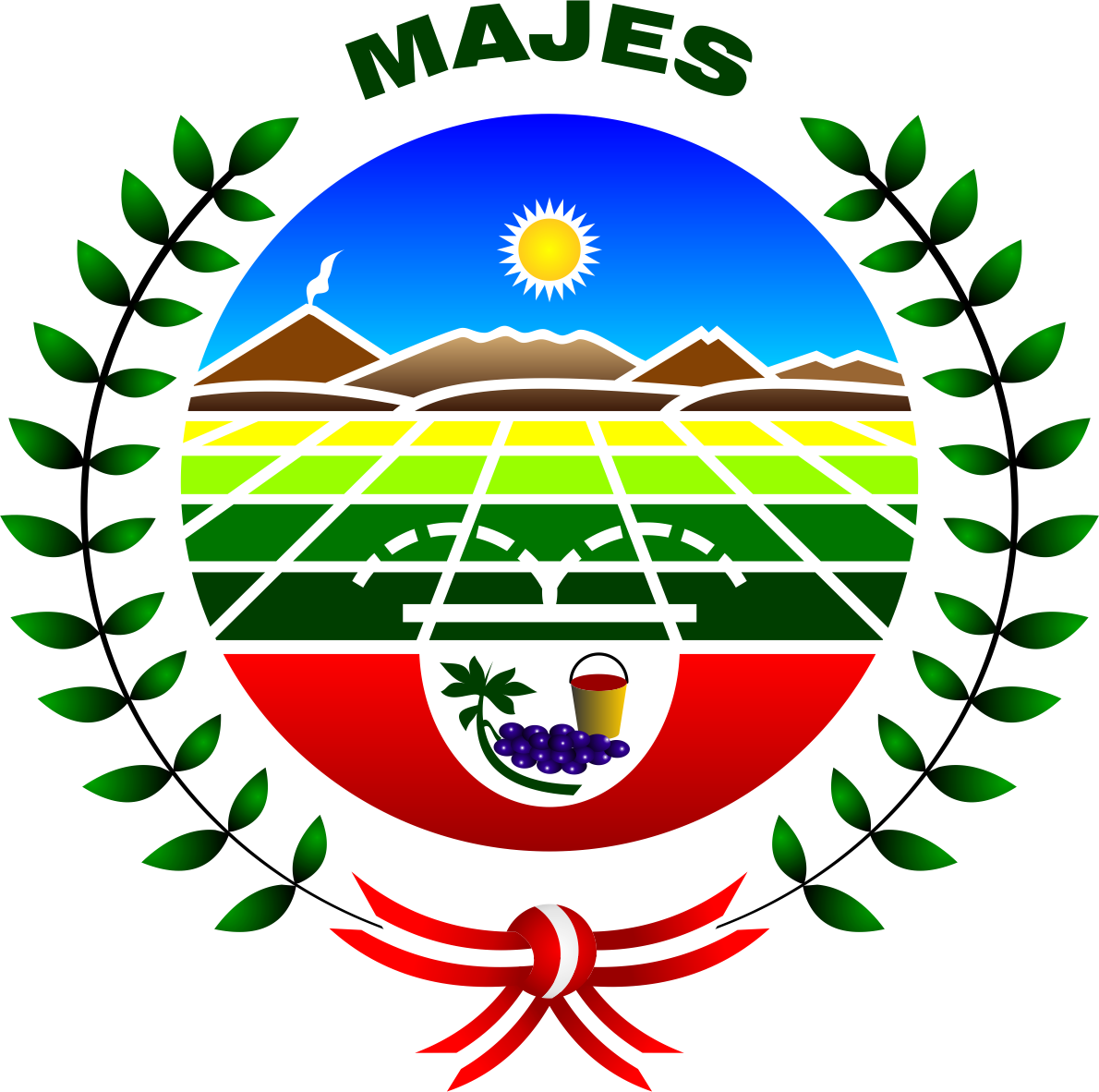
- Flag Coat of arms

- Location within Peru
- Coordinates: 16°21′45″S 72°11′28″W
- Country: Peru
- Region: Arequipa
- Province: Caylloma
- Founded: December 21, 1999
- Capital: El Pedregal

Government
  - Mayor: Renée Dionicio Cáceres Falla

Area
  - Total: 1,625.8 km^{2} (627.7 sq mi)
- Elevation: 1,420 m (4,660 ft)

Population (2005 census)
  - Total: 35,334
  - Density: 21.733/km^{2} (56.289/sq mi)
- Time zone: UTC-5 (PET)
- UBIGEO: 040520
- Website: https://munimajes.gob.pe

Majes District is one of twenty districts of the Caylloma Province of the Department of Arequipa in Peru. It is located some 55 miles (90 km) west of Arequipa, and about 50 miles (80 km) north of Camaná. Its capital is El Pedregal.

== History ==
The district was created on December 20, 1999 under the government of Alberto Fujimori, with its designated capital being El Pedregal. Surrounding areas were incorporated into the district on its creation. The area was relatively barren up until 1981, when an irrigation program was carried out. With the increase of fertile land, the population also grew substantially. The valley is noted for its agricultural tradition and somewhat isolated location, being located two hours away from Arequipa.

Being part of the Department of Arequipa, the first settlers were the pre-Incan peoples, such as the Wari, with the Inca Empire coming later. Once the Spanish had established and settled themselves in nearby Arequipa, Spanish descendants, as well as some of the indigenous population, would go on to populate the vicinity of the city's outer surroundings. This population type would not change until 1981, with the aforementioned irrigation program. To this day, the Spanish heritage prevails in both the European and Indigenous (as well as mixed) population, with some families from the Spanish era prevailing to this day, being well-known locally by their surnames alone.

In 2002, a large amount of dinosaur tracks and fossils were discovered by a group of locals, which gave birth to an interest in archeology in the region, with dinosaur-themed parks and other heritage sites being opened nearby.

== Geography ==
Majes is located in a valley two hours away from Arequipa, and most of the area is rural with the exception of El Pedregal. The Colca River is located to the west, while a large swath of desert surrounds it from the north, south, and east. In the vicinity of the area known as Alto Majes, some obsidian samples usually appear, while in the archaeological zone called El Alto Huacán, gabbro and olivine are somewhat common.

== Culture ==
Majes is an agricultural town. The area is known locally for its archeologic heritage, such as the many petroglyphs found, as well as a dinosaur-themed park in the valley to the west, and nationally for its pisco production, with its many wineries being popular. Fishing is also a popular activity in the district. Touristic attractions include outdoor sports, such as rafting or hiking, or the local gastronomy, with many of its restaurants specializing in traditional Peruvian food.

== Religion ==
Religion is important among the local population, with Catholicism being held in high esteem by the local population. Festivities such as the Virgen de Chapi, the feast of Santiago Apostol, and Our Lady of Mount Carmel are important in the area. Folk religions, while uncommon, have nonetheless exerted their influence in the general culture of the people of Majes.

== Sport ==
Sports activities, such as the local soccer district league, usually take place in the Estadio Almirante Miguel Grau, Majes' local stadium. The same stadium underwent renovations in 2011.

Majes is the home of the F.C. Sportivo Cariocos, and the F.C. Futuro Majes, as well as the Juventus Corazón.

== Transport ==
Due to its location in a valley, the only road available is the one connecting Arequipa-El Pedregal, whose trail lasts two hours. Public transport also serves this route. The rest of the valley is rural outside of the main town and nearby populated places.

== See also ==
- Caylloma Province
- Department of Arequipa
- Arequipa
