= Sport Estrella =

Peruvian football club

Club Sport Estrella
- Full name: Club Sport Estrella
- Nickname(s): El Histórico de la Capilla
- Founded: 1 May 1922; 102 years ago
- Ground: Estadio Revolución – Pueblo Nuevo, Colán, Piura
- Chairman: Lino Flores Macharé
- Manager: Javier Atoche
- League: Copa Peru
Home colours	Away colours

Club Sport Estrella is a Peruvian football club, located in the city of Paita, Piura. The club was founded in 1922 and plays in the Copa Perú, which is the third division of the Peruvian league.

== History ==
In the 2016 Copa Perú, the club qualified to the Departamental Stage, but was eliminated by Atlético Grau in the group stage.

In the 2017 Copa Perú, the club qualified to the Departamental Stage, but was eliminated by Deportivo Monteverde in the second stage.

In the 2019 Copa Perú, the club qualified to the Final Group Stage, but was eliminated when it finished in fourth place.

== Honours ==
=== Regional ===
- Liga Departamental de Piura:

Runner-up (1): 2019

- Liga Superior de Piura:

Runner-up (1): 2019

- Liga Provincial de Paita:

Winners (2): 2016, 2017

- Liga Distrital de Colán:

Winners (2): 2016, 2017

== See also ==
- List of football clubs in Peru
- Peruvian football league system
