= 2021 Copa Perú =

Copa Perú
- Season: 2021
- Champions: ADT (2nd title)
- Promoted: ADT; Alfonso Ugarte
- Top goalscorer: (Peru) Elvis Payé (9)

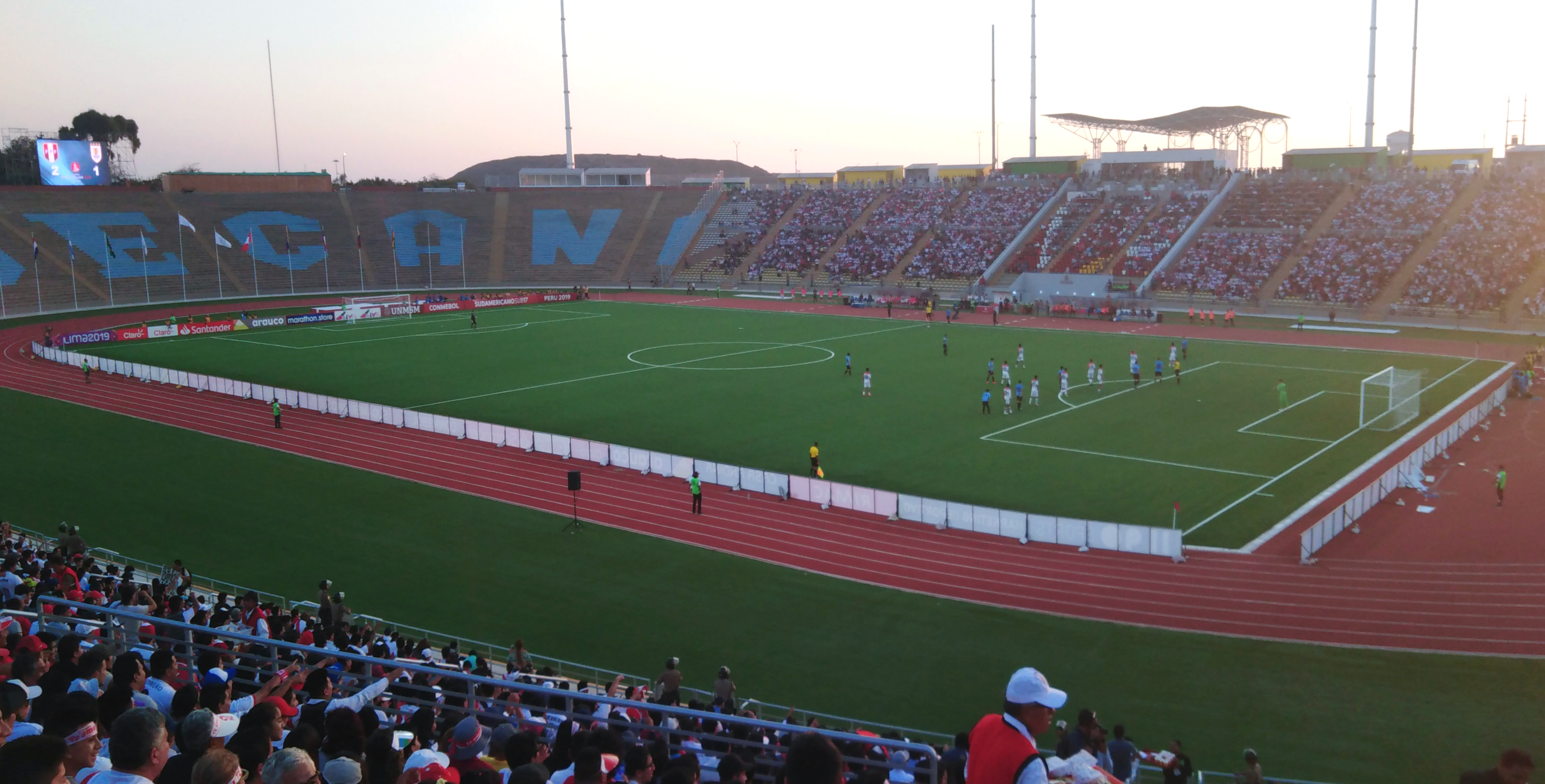

The 2021 Peru Cup season (Spanish: Copa Perú 2021), the largest amateur tournament of Peruvian football. The Regional Stage (Spanish: Etapa Regional) starts in October, and the National Stage (Spanish: Etapa Nacional) starts in November. The winner of the National Stage was promoted to the Liga 1 and the runner-up was promoted to the Liga 2.

== Departmental stage ==
The following list shows the teams that qualified for the Regional Stage.

Department	Team	Location
Amazonas	—	—
Ancash	Unión Juventud	Chimbote
Apurímac	Miguel Grau	Abancay
Apurímac	Andahuaylas	Andahuaylas
Arequipa	Nacional	Arequipa
Arequipa	Futuro Majes	Arequipa
Ayacucho	—	—
Cajamarca	Las Palmas	Chota
Cajamarca	Deportivo Coremarca	Bambamarca
Callao	Atlético Chalaco	Callao
Callao	Estrella Azul	Ventanilla
Cusco	Deportivo Garcilaso	Cusco
Huancavelica	UDA	Huancavelica
Huancavelica	UNH	Huancavelica
Huánuco	Deportivo Verdecocha	La Unión
Huánuco	Miguel Grau UDH	Huánuco
Ica	Octavio Espinosa	Ica
Ica	Unión San Martín	Pisco
Junín	ADT	Tarma
La Libertad	Real Sociedad	Sánchez Carrión
La Libertad	Racing	Sánchez Carrión

Department	Team	Location
Lambayeque	Los Caimanes	Puerto Etén
Lambayeque	Estudiantes de Túcume	Túcume
Lima	DIM	Miraflores
Lima	Los Ángeles Negros	Canta
Lima	Maristas	Huacho
Lima	Defensor Laure Sur	Chancay
Loreto	Nihue Rao	Iquitos
Madre de Dios	Athletico Maldonado	Tambopata
Moquegua	Credicoop San Cristóbal	Moquegua
Pasco	—	—
Piura	UDP	Sechura
Piura	Juventud Cautivo	Huancabamba
Puno	Alfonso Ugarte	Puno
Puno	Credicoop San Román	Juliaca
San Martín	—	—
Tacna	—	—
Tumbes	Renovación Pacífico	Tumbes
Ucayali	Colegio Comercio	Callería
Ucayali	Estudiantes de Economía	Manantay

== Regional Stage ==
=== Fase 1 - Regional ===
The round was played between 3 October and 6 October, on a home-and-away two-legged tie.

Team 1	Agg.	Team 2	1st leg	2nd leg
Miguel Grau	2–6	Andahuaylas	2–2	0–4
Nacional	2–4	Futuro Majes	1–1	1–3
Las Palmas	3–0	Deportivo Coremarca	2–0	1–0
Atlético Chalaco	0–2	Estrella Azul	0–1	0–1
UNH	2–5	UDA	1–1	1–4
Miguel Grau UDH	2–0 (2–4 p)	Deportivo Verdecocha	0–1	1–0
Octavio Espinosa	0–1	Unión San Martín	0–0	0–1
Real Sociedad	1–1	Racing	0–0	1–1
Los Caimanes	3–2	Estudiantes de Túcume	2–2	1–0
DIM	3–4	Maristas	1–2	2–2
Los Ángeles Negros	5–0	Defensor Laure Sur	2–0	3–0
Juventud Cautivo	1–4	UDP	0–1	1–3
Credicoop San Román	1–5	Alfonso Ugarte	1–1	0–4
Colegio Comercio	7–2	Estudiantes de Economía	1–0	6–2

=== Fase 2 - Interregional ===
The round was played on 10 October 2021, in a single knock-out match format.

Team 1	Score	Team 2
Renovación Pacífico	3–5	Los Caimanes
Real Sociedad	0–0 (2–4 p)	Estrella Azul
UDP	2–0	Las Palmas
ADT	3–0	Unión Juventud
UDA	2–1	Deportivo Verdecocha
Andahuaylas	3–4	Futuro Majes
Alfonso Ugarte	8–0	Athletico Maldonado
Maristas	1–1 (4–2 p)	Los Ángeles Negros
Nihue Rao	1–1 (6–5 p)	Unión San Martín

=== Fase 3 - Interregional ===
The round was played on 14 October 2021, in a single knock-out match format.

Team 1	Score	Team 2
Los Caimanes	1–1 (3–4 p)	Estrella Azul
Colegio Comercio	1–2	ADT
UDA	0–2	Credicoop San Cristóbal
Futuro Majes	0–1	Alfonso Ugarte
Maristas	0–0 (4–3 p)	Deportivo Garcilaso
Nihue Rao	0–0 (4–5 p)	Unión San Martín

== National Stage ==
=== Fase 4 ===
Pos	Team	Pld	W	D	L	GF	GA	GD	Pts	Qualification
1	ADT	7	4	2	1	16	9	+7	14	Final
2	Credicoop San Cristóbal	7	3	4	0	13	6	+7	13	Advance to Preliminary round
3	Alfonso Ugarte	7	3	4	0	13	7	+6	13	Advance to Preliminary round
4	Los Caimanes	7	2	4	1	7	8	−1	10	Advance to Preliminary round
5	Maristas	7	2	3	2	11	11	0	9	Advance to Preliminary round
6	Unión San Martín	7	2	2	3	11	12	−1	8	Ligas Departamentales
7	UDP	7	1	2	4	11	16	−5	5	Ligas Departamentales
8	Estrella Azul	7	0	1	6	4	17	−13	1	Ligas Departamentales

First match(es) will be played: 2021. Source: ADFP
Rules for classification: 1) Points; 2) Goal difference; 3) Goals for; 4) Drawing of lots.

==== Round 1 ====
27 October 2021	Unión San Martín	0–0	Los Caimanes	Estadio San Marcos
10:00				Referee: Alexander Blas

27 October 2021	Estrella Azul	1–1	Maristas	Estadio San Marcos
13:00	José Carlos García 33'		Josmar Rodas 58'	Referee: Alejandro Villanueva

27 October 2021	ADT	1–1	Credicoop San Cristóbal	Estadio San Marcos
15:30	Carlos Aliaga 67'		Hoover Crespo 80'	Referee: Pablo López

27 October 2021	UDP	2–2	Alfonso Ugarte	Estadio San Marcos
18:00	César Ruiz 79' (pen.); Yerzon Martínez 82'		Moisés Machaca 59'; Guillermo Vernal 63' (pen.)	Referee: David Huamán

==== Round 2 ====
31 October 2021	Unión San Martín	1–3	Maristas	Estadio San Marcos
10:00	Juan Vera 90+3'		Carlos Alfredo Fernández 15'; Antony Cuno 47'; Luis Enrique Rivas 90+5'	Referee: Béider Vásquez

31 October 2021	Estrella Azul	1–2	Alfonso Ugarte	Estadio San Marcos
13:00	Ronald Condori 7' (o.g.)		Elvis Payé 34'; Édson López 78'	Referee: Jonathan Zamora

31 October 2021	UDP	2–2	Credicoop San Cristóbal	Estadio San Marcos
15:30	César Ruiz 26' (pen.); Jonathan Sauñe 41' (pen.)		Jossimar Serrato 36' (pen.); Hoover Crespo 66' (pen.)	Referee: Wilmer Villanueva

31 October 2021	ADT	2–2	Los Caimanes	Estadio San Marcos
18:00	Jorge Palomino 57'; Nelson Dávila 90+1' (pen.)		Pierre Orosco 39' (pen.); Anthony Cubas 50'	Referee: Luis Garay

==== Round 3 ====
3 November 2021	Estrella Azul	0–2	Los Caimanes	Estadio San Marcos
10:30			Junior Zambrano 72' 74'	Referee: Daniel Ureta

3 November 2021	UDP	3–4	ADT	Estadio San Marcos
13:00	Yerzon Martínez 72'; Yerzon Martínez 73'; Jonathan Sauñe 87'		Jardy Portocarrero 4'; Waldir Calderón 45+2'; Nelson Dávila 58'; Jorge Palomino 81'	Referee: Fernando Legario

3 November 2021	Unión San Martín	1–1	Alfonso Ugarte	Estadio San Marcos
15:30	Carlos Ferreyra 28'		Saúl Reyes 87'	Referee: Jordi Espinoza

3 November 2021	Credicoop San Cristóbal	4–2	Maristas	Estadio San Marcos
18:00	Jossimar Serrato 2'; Juan Carlos Ramírez 42' 49'; Jankarlo Chirinos 89'		Carlos Andrés Lazón 56'; Josshimar Pacheco 75' (pen.)	Referee: Joel Alarcón

==== Round 4 ====
7 November 2021	Unión San Martín	0–3	Credicoop San Cristóbal	Estadio San Marcos
10:30

7 November 2021	ADT	1–2	Alfonso Ugarte	Estadio San Marcos
13:00

7 November 2021	Estrella Azul	0–1	UDP	Estadio San Marcos
15:30

7 November 2021	Maristas	0–0	Los Caimanes	Estadio San Marcos
18:00

==== Round 5 ====
10 November 2021	Unión San Martín	0–2	ADT	Estadio San Marcos
10:30			Nelson Dávila 33'; Carlos Aliaga 38'

10 November 2021	UDP	1–2	Maristas	Estadio San Marcos
13:00	César Febres 27'		José Mesías 10' 51'

10 November 2021	Estrella Azul	0–2	Credicoop San Cristóbal	Estadio San Marcos
15:30			Hoover Crespo 39'; Ronald Figueroa 90+1'	Referee: Alexander Blas

10 November 2021	Alfonso Ugarte	4–0	Los Caimanes	Estadio San Marcos
18:00	Elvis Payé 7' 25'; Saúl Reyes 14'; Kelvin Alcalde 90+4'

==== Round 6 ====
14 November 2021	Alfonso Ugarte	2–2	Maristas	Estadio San Marcos
	Elvis Payé 41'; José Luis Granda 62'		Carlos Alberto Lazón 2'; José Carlos Mesias 29'	Referee: Augusto Menéndez

14 November 2021	Estrella Azul	0–4	ADT	Estadio San Marcos
13:00			Waldir Calderón 7'; Harby Osorio 10'; Sinclair García 58'; Carlos Aliaga 90+4'	Referee: Michael Espinoza

14 November 2021	Credicoop San Cristóbal	1–1	Los Caimanes	Estadio San Marcos
15:30	Jerjes Jiménez 28'		Alexis Paz 90'	Referee: Joel Alarcón

14 November 2021	Unión San Martín	4–1	UDP	Estadio San Marcos
18:00	Carlos Ferreyra 15'; Jesús Mogollón 47'; Ricardo Morán 71'; Renzo Medina 81'		Edwin Juárez 17'	Referee: Hibert Villegas

==== Round 7 ====
17 November 2021	Unión San Martín	5–2	Estrella Azul	Estadio San Marcos
10:30	Ricardo Morán 15'; José Luis Coronado 48'; Carlos Ferreyra 67'; Juan Vera 82'; Gianfranco Casanova 90+3'		Jahirsino Baylón 48'; William Laya 73'	Referee: Jesús Cartagena

17 November 2021	UDP	1–2	Los Caimanes	Estadio San Marcos
13:00	César Ruiz 78'		Isidro Arroyo 6'; Junior Zambrano 90+2'	Referee: Augusto Menéndez

17 November 2021	ADT	2–1	Maristas	Estadio San Marcos
15:30	Pedro Martínez 2'; Gu Rum Choi 84'		Julio Cafferata 12'	Referee: Edwin Ordóñez

17 November 2021	Credicoop San Cristóbal	0–0	Alfonso Ugarte	Estadio San Marcos
18:00				Referee: Diego Haro

=== Fase 5 ===
==== Preliminary round ====
22 November 2021	Credicoop San Cristóbal	5–0	Maristas	Estadio San Marcos
11:00	Jankarlo Chirinos 39' 41'; Jairo Montalve 44'; Percy Paz 76'; Yeison Vinces 82'			Referee: Kevin Ortega

22 November 2021	Alfonso Ugarte	3–1	Los Caimanes	Estadio San Marcos
14:00	Elvis Payé 25'; Manuel Olaya 31'; César Medina 59'		Alexis Paz 52'	Referee: Joel Alarcón

==== Semifinals ====
25 November 2021	Credicoop San Cristóbal	0–1	Alfonso Ugarte	Estadio San Marcos
14:00			Guillermo Vernal 4' (pen.)	Referee: Augusto Menéndez

==== Final ====
29 November 2021	ADT	0–0 (5–3 p)	Alfonso Ugarte	Estadio San Marcos
13:30				Referee: Michael Espinoza
	Penalties
	Víctor Jiménez (penalty scored); Nelson Dávila (penalty scored); Emilio Gutiérrez (penalty scored); Sinclair García (penalty scored); Gu-Rum Choi (penalty scored)		Allonso Dávila (penalty scored); Saúl Reyes (penalty missed); José Luis Granda (penalty scored); Marcos Ortiz (penalty scored)

== Top goalscorers ==
Rank	Name	Club	Goals
1	(Peru) Elvis Payé	Alfonso Ugarte	9
2	(Peru) Pierre Orosco	Los Caimanes	6
3	(Peru) Yerzon Martínez	UDP; Las Palmas	6
4	(Peru) Anthony Cuno	Maristas; Futuro Majes	5
5	(Peru) Saúl Reyes	Alfonso Ugarte	5
6	(Peru) Manuel Olaya	Alfonso Ugarte	5
7	(Peru) Jankarlo Chirinos	Credicoop San Cristóbal	5
8	(Peru) Guillermo Vernal	Alfonso Ugarte	5

== See also ==
- 2021 Liga 1
- 2021 Liga 2
- 2021 in Peruvian football
