= FC Carlos Stein =

Peruvian football club

Carlos Stein - Cristo Rey
- Full name: Asociación Fútbol Club Carlos Stein - Academia Deportiva Cooperativa Cristo Rey
- Nickname: Los Carlistas
- Founded: 6 March 2012; 13 years ago
- Ground: Estadio Wilberto Herrera Carlín, Jaén
- Capacity: 3,000
- Chairman: Ronald Revolledo Hidalgo
- Manager: Orlando Lavalle
- League: Liga 3
- 2024: Liga 2, 16th (relegated)
Home colours	Away colours

Asociación Fútbol Club Carlos Stein - Academia Deportiva Cooperativa Cristo Rey is a Peruvian football club from the José Leonardo Ortiz District in the city of Lambayeque. The team currently plays in the Peruvian Tercera División.

== History ==
The club was founded on 6 March 2012 as Asociación FC Carlos Stein in the Chiclayo district of José Leonardo Ortiz by a group of residents of the Carlos Stein urbanization: Branagh Castañeda, Guillermo Terrones, Felipe Correa Esteban Inga, among others, headed by Miguel Quesquen decided to create a soccer team named after the place where they were born and raised.

In the beginning, the club began competition in the Jose Leonardo Ortiz third division District League. With the support of neighbors and relatives of the footballers themselves, the team was promoted on its maiden season to the district league's second division. The following year, after another excellent campaign, the club was able to climb to the first division of the district league, obtaining the right to compete in the higher stages of the Copa Perú.

For the 2015 campaign the team had some financial problems which almost prevented it from competing in the district league. However, one of its founders appeared, Arturo Rodríguez provided the financial support necessary for the club to continue competing. In this way, in 2016, Carlos Stein achieved its first district league title. In the middle of that same year, Arturo Rodríguez suffered a heart attack that ended his life, as a tribute, the team wore jerseys with his likeness at its next game.

In 2017, Carlos Stein was one of the Lambayeque Region representatives in the national stage of the Copa Perú after having been the district league runner-up, provincial league runner-up and departmental stage runner-up. In the national stage, it surpassed the regular phase eliminating Somos Olímpico from Lima in the first round and losing in the second round to Atlético Grau.

In 2018, Carlos Stein was the Chiclayo provincial stage champion and later the Lambayeque departmental stage runner-up. This again allowed the team to participate in the national stage of the Copa Perú. It was eliminated by Deportivo Garcilaso in the Second Round.

In 2019, the Carlistas won the José Leonardo Ortiz district league, once again they conquered the Provincial League of Chiclayo and this time they also achieved the Lambayeque departmental league title. It had no problem getting through the regular phase of the 2019 Copa Perú, by defeating Deportivo Manaos 7–1 on aggregate in the round of 32. In the round of 16, its rival was Miguel Grau de Abancay, who defeated Carlos Stein by 3–0, and then by 2–0 in the second leg. The overall result eliminated Carlos Stein from the competition, however the club filed a claim for the improper fielding of Jimmy Aguilar, a Miguel Grau's player who was suspended. Both matches against Miguel Grau were awarded to Carlos Stein and Miguel Grau was suspended from the competition. In the quarterfinals, Carlos Stein eliminated Credicoop San Cristóbal from Moquegua by a 4–4 aggregate, going through on away goals and becoming the first classified team to that year's Copa Perú's final group stage.

In the final group stage, Stein drew 1–1 against Sport Estrella, defeated Sport Chavelines by 2–1 and in then once again drew 2–2 against Deportivo Llacuabamba, which left the team in second place by goal difference. Carlos Stein then presented a claim for the improper fielding of Milton Bermejo by Deportivo Llacuabamba and on 3 December 2019, the Justice Commission of the Peruvian Football Federation declared the claim valid, awarding Stein the game against Llacuabamba by 3–0 and thus giving the 2019 Copa Perú title and promotion to the 2020 Liga 1 to Carlos Stein.

Carlos Stein got relegated to the Peruvian Tercera División in 2024.

== Rivalries ==
Carlos Stein has had a long-standing rivalry with Pirata.

== Honours ==
=== Senior titles ===
Keys

- Record
- ^{(s)} Shared record

Type	Competition	Titles	Runner-up	Winning years	Runner-up years
National (League)	Liga 2	—	1	—	2021
National (League)	Copa Perú	1	—	2019	—
Regional (League)	Liga Departamental de Lambayeque	1	2	2019	2017, 2018
Regional (League)	Liga Provincial de Chiclayo	2	1	2018, 2019	2017
Regional (League)	Liga Distrital de José Leonardo Ortiz	2	2	2016, 2019	2017

== See also ==
- List of football clubs in Peru
- Peruvian football league system
