= Sport Chavelines Juniors =

Peruvian football club

Sport Chavelines
- Full name: Club Sport Chavelines Juniors
- Nickname: La gaviota
- Founded: 13 February 1984; 41 years ago
- Ground: Estadio Municipal de Pacasmayo, Pacasmayo, La Libertad
- Chairman: (Peru) Jean Acevedo
- Manager: (Peru) José Melecio
- League: Liga 2
- 2021: Liga 2, 3rd
Home colours	Away colours	Third colours

Club Sport Chavelines Juniors is a Peruvian football club, located in the city of Pacasmayo, La Libertad. The club was founded in 1984 and plays in the Liga 2 which is the second division of the Peruvian league.

== History ==
In the 2014 Copa Perú, the club qualified to the National Stage, but was eliminated by Cristal Tumbes in the Round of 16.

In the 2016 Copa Perú, the club qualified to the National Stage, but was eliminated in the First Round.

In the 2019 Copa Perú, they qualified for the semifinals of the National Stage and participated in the promotion playoffs. In one of their games, they won 24-0.

== Honours ==
=== Senior titles ===
Keys

- Record
- ^{(s)} Shared record

Type	Competition	Titles	Runner-up	Winning years	Runner-up years
Half-year / Short tournament (League)	Torneo Apertura (Liga 2)	1	—	2021	—
Regional (League)	Liga Departamental de La Libertad	2	1	2014, 2019	2016
Regional (League)	Liga Provincial de Pacasmayo	3	—	2014, 2019	2016, 2017
Regional (League)	Liga Distrital de Pacasmayo	3	1	2014, 2016, 2019	2017

== See also ==
- List of football clubs in Peru
- Peruvian football league system
