= Deportivo Llacuabamba =

Peruvian football club

- Full name: Club Social Cultural Deportivo Llacuabamba
- Nicknames: Mineros; La Resistencia Celeste; El Llampatamba
- Founded: 15 March 2011; 15 years ago
- Ground: Estadio Comunal de Llacuabamba, Parcoy, La Libertad
- Capacity: 500
- Chairman: (Peru) Loyer Santisteban
- Manager: (Argentina) Fernando Nogara
- League: Liga 2
- 2023: Liga 2, 4th
- Website: https://www.facebook.com/clubllacuabamba/
Home colours	Away colours

Club Social Cultural Deportivo Llacuabamba is a Peruvian football club, based in the Department of La Libertad, Pataz, La Libertad. The club was founded in 2011 and currently play in the Liga 2 tournament.

== History ==
In 2019 Copa Perú, the club was promoted to the Peruvian Primera División after drawing with Carlos Stein in the Final group stage.

== Current squad ==
Note: Flags indicate national team as defined under FIFA eligibility rules; some limited exceptions apply. Players may hold more than one non-FIFA nationality.

No.	Pos.	Nation	Player
1	GK	CUB	José Cruz
3	DF	PER	Quembol Guadalupe
4	DF	COL	Jonathan Segura
7	MF	PER	Roger Chinga
8	MF	PER	Adriel Trelles
9	FW	PER	Anthony Osorio
10	MF	PER	Josue Tunqui
11	FW	URU	Diego López
12	GK	PER	Diego López
14	MF	PER	Jean Pier Vílchez
15	FW	PER	Angel Cabrera
16	DF	PER	Pirlo Oba
17	FW	PER	Junior Paredes
18	MF	PER	Farik Ventura
19	DF	PER	Neiton Alejandría

No.	Pos.	Nation	Player
20	FW	PER	Alex Pullchz
21	GK	PER	Octavio Ramos
23	MF	PER	Farid Rojas (Captain)
25	MF	PER	Caleb Guzmán
26	DF	PER	Gerson Iraola
27	DF	PER	Ricar Rodríguez
28	FW	ARG	Maximiliano Zárate
29	MF	PER	Anghelo Agurto
30	MF	COL	José David Leudo
32	DF	PER	Aarón Icaza
35	MF	PER	Diego Sánchez
44	DF	PER	Erick Rossi
46	MF	PER	Jorge Agüero
74	GK	ARG	Marcos Díaz
77	MF	PER	Bryan Urrutia

== Honours ==
=== Senior titles ===
Keys

- Record
- ^{(s)} Shared record

Type	Competition	Titles	Runner-up	Winning years	Runner-up years
National (League)	Cuadrangular de Ascenso	—	1	—	2019
National (League)	Copa Perú	—	1	—	2019
Regional (League)	Liga Departamental de La Libertad	1	—	2019	—
Regional (League)	Liga Provincial de Pataz	3	1	2013, 2015, 2019	2014
Regional (League)	Liga Distrital del Parcoy	1	—	2019	—

== See also ==
- List of football clubs in Peru
- Peruvian football league system
