= Pirata FC =

Pirata F.C.
- Full name: Pirata Futbol Club
- Nicknames: Piratas del Norte; Filibusteros; Bucaneros
- Founded: 15 November 2015; 10 years ago
- Ground: César Flores Marigorda, Lambayeque
- Capacity: 7,000
- Owner: (Peru) Manuel Aguinaga
- Manager: (Peru) Jahir Butrón
- League: Liga 2
- 2023: Liga 2, 12th
- Website: https://www.facebook.com/Piratafcjlo/
Home colours	Away colours

Pirata Fútbol Club is a Peruvian professional association football club based in José Leonardo Ortiz District in the city of Chiclayo, Lambayeque Region. The team currently competes in the Liga 2.

== History ==
The club was founded on November 15, 2015 in the José Leonardo Ortiz District. It is named after the brother of honorary president Luis Alberto Guevara. Molinos El Pirata is owned by G&B Molinos, a rice processing plant.

El Pirata had a very successful maiden campaign which it started from the José Leonardo Ortiz District League in the Copa Perú. That year it finished the district league as runner-up and won the Chiclayo provincial league. It would then go on to become the Lambayeque departmental champion and qualify for the National Stage for the first time.

In the national stage it finished 14th out of 50 with three games won, two draws, and only one defeat against Comercial Aguas Verdes. This was enough for El Pirata to qualify for the play-offs which it played against Racing de Huamachuco. It lost the first leg 4–0 in Huamachuco and was close to overturning the result by winning 0–3.

The team had a short campaign in 2017 where it failed to overcome the Provincial Stage of the Copa Perú tournament.

In 2018, Molinos El Pirata won the José Leonardo Ortiz district league, and was runner-up in the Chiclayo provincial league to qualify for the Lambayeque Departamental Stage. In that stage it was drawn into Group A where it faced local rivals Carlos Stein as well as JJ Arquitectura, AJEC, and Porvernir Miraflores. It qualified to the semifinals as second in its group to play Estudiantes Boca. In the finals it defeated Carlos Stein by 3–1 on a single leg match.

In the National Stage, the team finished 3rd with of 50 with four games won and two drawn. A match between it and Carlos Stein was awarded to the latter. The last match of the group against UD Parachique, which ended in a draw, was awarded to Molinos El Pirata. The club then defeated Defensor Laure Sur by a global score of 4–4 and advance because of a better seed to the next stage. There it defeated Credicoop San Cristóbal by a global score of 5–4 to qualify for the final group stage or La Finalísima for the first time in its history.

In the final group stage it defeated Santos by 4–0 on November 24. It was then defeated by Alianza Universidad on November 28 leaving all four final group teams with 3 points each. In the final matchday, December 2, Alianza Universidad defeated Santos by 5–2 on the first match which meant Molinos El Pirata needed only to defeat its last rival, Unión Deportivo Ascensión, by more than two goals to win the tournament. The final score was 6–0.

== Badge and colors ==
The team uses a green as its primary color. Its first badge consisted of a generic image of a pirate which was quickly changed to an image of Disney's fictional character Jack Sparrow from the Pirates of the Caribbean film series. The image of the character was placed inside a white circle which reads "MOLINOS EL PIRATA" on the upper half and "JOSÉ LEONARDO ORTIZ" at the bottom. After reaching the 2018 Copa Perú final group stage, the club changed its badge to that of a generic pirate drawing because of copyright infringement. Within days the generic pirate image was also taken down from the club's social media page as it too was used without permission. Before the first match of the final group stage, an image of a Jack Sparrow look-alike was unveiled by the team for use in their badge.

== Honours ==
=== Senior titles ===
Keys

- Record
- ^{(s)} Shared record

Type	Competition	Titles	Runner-up	Winning years	Runner-up years
National (League)	Copa Perú	1	—	2018	—
Regional (League)	Liga Departamental de Lambayeque	2	—	2016, 2018	—
Regional (League)	Liga Provincial de Chiclayo	1	1	2016	2018
Regional (League)	Liga Distrital de José Leonardo Ortiz	1		2018	2016

== Current squad ==
As of 16 June 2024

Source: Note: Flags indicate national team as defined under FIFA eligibility rules; some limited exceptions apply. Players may hold more than one non-FIFA nationality.

No.	Pos.	Nation	Player
1	GK	PER	Jean Carlo Huamanta
2	DF	PER	Giovanni Macchiavello
3	DF	PER	Pedro Diez Canseco
5	MF	PER	Harón Hoyos (captain)
6	MF	PER	Leonardo Carrillo
7	FW	PER	Axell Domínguez (loan from Sport Boys)
8	MF	PER	Sebastián Hidalgo
9	FW	PER	Paolo Cruzado
10	MF	COL	Mario Ramírez
11	FW	PER	Siles Martínez
12	GK	PER	Paolo Izaguirre
13	FW	PER	Leandro Díaz
14	DF	PER	Gerardo Quiroz

No.	Pos.	Nation	Player
15	DF	PER	Axel Gadea
16	MF	PER	Renzo Paredes
17	FW	PER	Flavio Fernández
19	DF	PER	Patricio Ramírez
20	DF	PER	Rodrigo Robles
21	FW	PER	Tin Lozano
22	DF	PER	Martín Peralta
23	FW	PER	José Flores
25	MF	ARG	Juan Manuel Martínez
26	MF	PER	Salomé Santos
28	FW	ARG	Maximiliano Zárate
32	DF	PER	Maycol Súclupe
74	GK	PER	José Lozada
