= Cutervo National Park =

National park in Peru

- IUCN category II (national park)
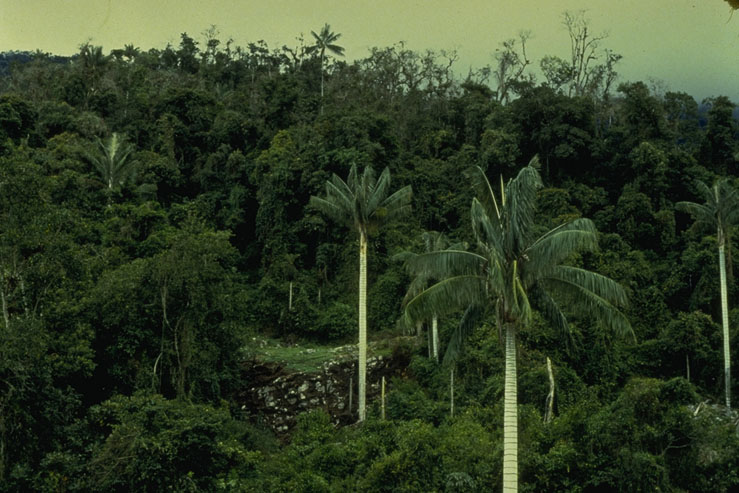
- Forests at Cutervo National Park

- Location within Peru
- Location: Peru; Cutervo Province, Cajamarca
- Coordinates: 6°12′7″S 78°47′18″W
- Area: 8,214 hectares (31.71 sq mi)
- Established: September 8, 1961
- Governing body: SERNANP
- Website: Parque Nacional de Cutervo

Cutervo National Park (Spanish: Parque Nacional de Cutervo), established in 1961, is the oldest protected area in Peru. It is located in the northern Peruvian Andes, in the region of Cajamarca. The park was extended to 8,214 hectares (31.71 sq mi) and protects areas of Andean montane forests and paramo for headwater conservation. Moreover, those areas are the habitat of animal species like the spectacled bear, the mountain tapir, and the oilbird; and plant species like the Andean wax palms.

== History ==
Human occupation in the area dates back to the Pre-Columbian era. Archaeological remains are present inside the national park, primarily within the El Perolito Archaeological Site.

Following the 8th Pan-American Conference in 1938 held in Lima, the nature conservationist society Comité Nacional de Protección a la Naturaleza (National Committee of Nature Protection) was founded, which included the Federación Cultural de Cutervo-Lima (Cultural Federation of Cutervo in Lima). Federación Cultural de Cutervo-Lima submitted a project for a national park near Cutervo to the Ministry of Agriculture that was dismissed.

Biologist Salomon Vilchez Murga, as deputy for the region of Cajamarca (Note: elected in 1956), presented a project to the congress for the creation of Cutervo National Park, which passed as law 13694 on September 8, 1961, and took effect 12 days later on September 20. The park was created with a surface of 2,500 hectares (25 km^{2}). A proposal to increase the park area was submitted by the Peruvian environmental authorities in 2000. Law 28860 expanded the area of the park to the current 8,214 hectares (82.14 km^{2}) on August 3, 2006. In 2007, a buffer zone surrounding the national park was created in order to diminish pressure and threats to the ecosystems inside the park.

== Geography ==
Cutervo National Park is located in the districts of San Andres de Cutervo, Santo Domingo de la Capilla, Callayuc, Santa Cruz de Cutervo, Pimpingos and Santo Tomas de Aquino; which belong to the Cutervo Province, within the region of Cajamarca. The park's 8,214 hectares (82.14 km^{2}) are divided in the Northern sector with 2,429.54 hectares (24.2954 km^{2}) and the Southern sector with 5,784.69 hectares (57.8469 km^{2}). The buffer zone surrounding the park comprises an area of 19,425.77 hectares (194.2577 km^{2}).

The most prominent geographical feature, at the highest elevation in the park, is the mountain range Cordillera de Tarros. This mountain has several caves and is the origin of several streams. Elevations inside the park range between 1550 and 3500 meters above sea level.

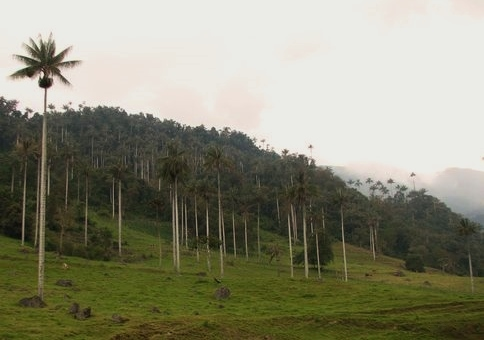
Another view of the national park.

== Ecology ==
The park protects part of the Peruvian Yungas ecoregion. A variety of ecological communities exist within the park including wet montane forests, high-elevation grasslands above 3000 m, rivers, and small lakes.

=== Flora ===
Over seven hundred species of vascular plants have been recorded in the park. Many are broadleaved trees (e.g.: Chionanthus pubescens, Cornus peruviana, Hedyosmum scabrum, Morus insignis, Ocotea arnottiana, Prunus integrifolia, Polylepis multijuga, Vallea stipularis, etc.), conifer (Podocarpus oleifolius) and palm trees (e.g.: Ceroxylon spp.). Orchids are represented by 88 recorded morphospecies.

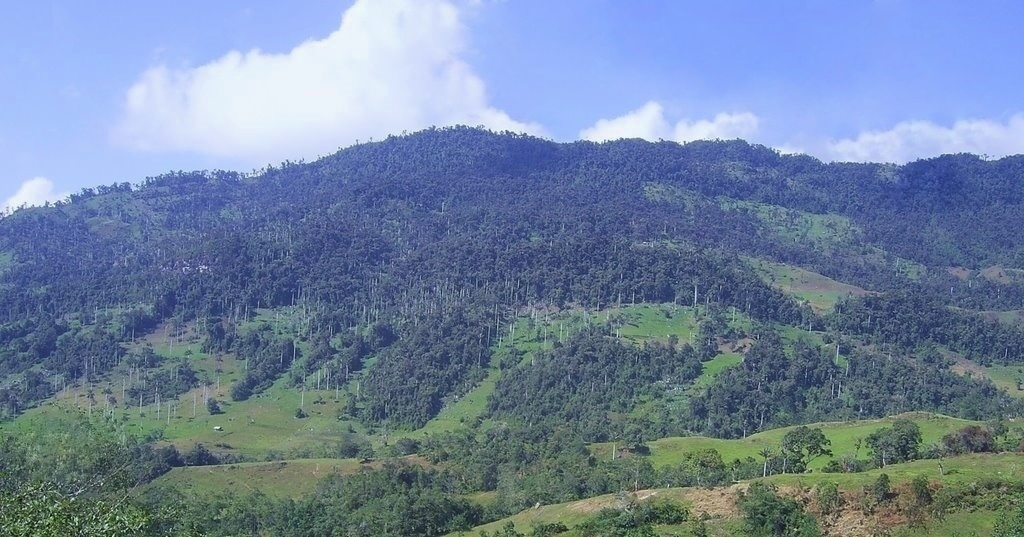
Deforestation at Cutervo National Park.

=== Fauna ===
The park is home to mammal species facing risk of extinction such as the neotropical otter, the mountain tapir, the spectacled bear, the mountain paca, the giant anteater, and a species of wild cat (Leopardus colocolo). Bird species like the oilbird, the golden-headed quetzal, and the Andean cock-of-the-rock are also live within the park. A species of catfish (Astroblepus rosei) can be seen in the underground streams of the caves inside the park.

== Climate ==
Forests in the area are covered by clouds and fog almost year-round. The park's average annual rainfall is more than 800 mm (31 in), and the maximum annual rainfall is almost 2,000 mm (79 in). The temperature is between 18–23 °C (64–73 °F) at 1000–2000 meters, between 14–18 °C (57–64 °F) at 2000–2500 meters, and between 7–14 °C (45–57 °F) at 2500–3500 meters.

== Recreation ==
Camping and hiking are the most popular activities in the park, especially between July and October.

While there are several caves inside the park, the most visited by tourists are Gruta de los Guácharos (Oilbird Cave), Gruta Blanca (White Cave), and Gruta del Murciélago (Bats' Cave). Stalactites and stalagmites are present in all the caves. Some caves have underground streams home to the rare catfish species Astroblepus rosei.

The palm tree forests produce ample fruit that attracts oilbirds.

Páramo mountaintops have both grassland and lakes.

== Environmental issues ==
The main threats to the park's biodiversity are wood extraction and forest clearing for agriculture and pastures. A large issue is the rejection by some local inhabitants of the new park boundaries.
