= Santo Tomas =

Santo Tomás is Spanish for Saint Thomas. Santo Tomas may also refer to:

== Places ==
=== Argentina ===
- Santo Tomás, Buenos Aires, Carlos Casares Partido, Buenos Aires Province
- Santo Tomás, Neuquén

=== Colombia ===
- Santo Tomás, Atlantico

=== Cuba ===
- Santo Tomás, Cuba, Ciego de Ávila Province

=== El Salvador ===
- Santo Tomás, San Salvador

=== Guatemala ===
- Santo Tomás de Castilla, Izabal Department
- Santo Tomás La Unión, Suchitepéquez Department
- Volcán Santo Tomás

=== Mexico ===
- Santo Tomas Copper Deposit, Sinaloa, Mexico
- Misión Santo Tomás de Aquino, in Baja California
- Santo Tomás, Baja California
- Santo Tomás de los Plátanos, in México
- Santo Tomás Jalieza, in Oaxaca
- Santo Tomás Mazaltepec, in Oaxaca
- Santo Tomás Ocotepec, in Oaxaca
- Santo Tomás Tamazulapan, in Oaxaca
- Santo Tomás, Sonora

=== Nicaragua ===
- Santo Tomás, Chontales

=== Panama ===
- Santo Tomás, Chiriquí
  - Santo Tomás metro station

=== Peru ===
- Santo Tomás District, Luya, in Luya province, Amazonas region
- Santo Tomás District, Cutervo, in Cutervo province, Cajamarca region
- Santo Tomás District, Chumbivilcas, in Chumbivilcas province, Cusco region
- Santo Tomás de Pata District, in Angaraes province, Huancavelica region

=== Philippines ===
- Santo Tomas, Batangas
- Santo Tomas, Davao del Norte
- Santo Tomas, Isabela
- Santo Tomas, La Union
- Santo Tomas, Pampanga
- Santo Tomas, Pangasinan
- Mount Santo Tomas

=== Spain ===
- Santo Tomas, Menorca

=== United States ===
- Santo Tomás, Texas
- Misión Santo Tomás de Aquino, California

== Other uses ==
- Convento de Santo Tomás (Madrid), a former convent
- University of Santo Tomas, in Manila, Philippines
- Santo Tomas Internment Camp in the Philippines
- Domingo de Santo Tomás Spanish Dominican bishop and grammarian in the Viceroyalty of Peru

== See also ==
- Santo Tomás District (disambiguation)
- Saint Thomas (disambiguation)
