= St. Thomas Hospital =

St. Thomas Hospital or Saint Thomas Hospital may refer to:

- Ascension Saint Thomas, an integrated health delivery system based in Nashville, Tennessee, U.S.
  - Saint Thomas - Rutherford Hospital, formerly Middle Tennessee Medical Center
  - Saint Thomas - West Hospital, formerly Saint Thomas Hospital
  - Saint Thomas Hickman Hospital
  - Saint Thomas - Midtown Hospital
- Hospital Santo Tomás, in Panama City, Panama
- Hospital of St Thomas of Canterbury, a house of Augustinian canons in medieval Birmingham, England
- Saint Thomas Hospital (Malta), in Qormi, Malta
- St Thomas' Hospital, in London, England
- St Thomas' Hospital, Scarborough, in North Yorkshire, England
- St Thomas' Hospital, Stockport, in Greater Manchester, England
- Summa St. Thomas Hospital, in Akron, Ohio
