= Santo Tomás District =

Santo Tomás District may refer to:

- Peru:
  - Santo Tomás District, Luya, in Luya province, Amazonas region
  - Santo Tomás District, Cutervo, in Cutervo province, Cajamarca region
  - Santo Tomás District, Chumbivilcas, in Chumbivilcas province, Cusco region
  - Santo Tomás de Pata District, in Angaraes province, Huancavelica region
- Costa Rica:
  - Santo Tomás District, Santo Domingo, in Santo Domingo canton, Heredia province

== See also ==
- Santo Tomás (disambiguation)
