= Saint Thomas =

Saint Thomas or St. Thomas may refer to:

== People ==
- Thomas the Apostle (died AD 72), Jewish-Christian follower of Jesus and evangelist
- Thomas the Hermit, Coptic Desert Father and Saint of the 4th century
- Thomas of Maurienne or Thomas of Farfa Abbey (died 720), the first abbot of the Abbey of Farfa
- Thomas I of Constantinople (died 610), Ecumenical Patriarch of Constantinople 607–610
- Thomas II of Constantinople (died 668–669), Ecumenical Patriarch of Constantinople 667–669
- Thomas Becket (died 1170), also called Saint Thomas of Canterbury and Saint Thomas the Martyr
- Thomas Aquinas (1225–1274), Catholic philosopher and theologian
- Thomas Cantilupe, or Thomas of Hereford (died 1282)
- Thomas of Dover or Thomas Hales (died 1295), martyr
- Thomas of Tolentino (died 1321), martyred in India
- Thomas, 2nd Earl of Lancaster (1278–1322), venerated as a saint after his execution
- Thomas of Villanova (1488–1555), Spanish friar of the Order of Saint Augustine, writer, archbishop
- Thomas More (1478–1535), English lawyer, philosopher, author, statesman
- Thomas Percy, 7th Earl of Northumberland, (1528-1572) Earl of Northumberland, leader of the Rising of the North, Martyr
- Thomas Danki (died 1597), see Saints Paul Miki and Companions
- Thomas Kozaki (died 1597), see Saints Paul Miki and Companions
- Thomas Garnet (died 1608), Jesuit priest who was executed in London
- Thomas De Van Nguyen (died 1839), of the Vietnamese Martyrs
- Thomas Du Viet Dinh (died 1839), of the Vietnamese Martyrs
- Thomas Thien Tran (died 1838), of the Vietnamese Martyrs
- Thomas Toan, of the Vietnamese Martyrs
- Thomas Khuong, of the Vietnamese Martyrs
- Saint Thomas (basketball), (born 2003) American basketball player

== Places ==
=== Austria ===
- Sankt Thomas, municipality in Grieskirchen district of Upper Austria
- Sankt Thomas am Blasenstein, municipality in Perg district of Upper Austria

=== Brazil ===
- São Tomé, Rio Grande do Norte, municipality in Rio Grande do Norte, Brazil
- São Tomé, Paraná, city in Paraná, Brazil

=== Canada ===
- St. Thomas, Newfoundland and Labrador, Canada
- St. Thomas, Ontario, Canada
- Saint-Thomas, Quebec, Canada
- Saint-Thomas-Didyme, Quebec, Canada
- Saint-Thomas-d'Aquin, former municipality now part of Saint-Hyacinthe, Quebec, Canada
- Saint-Thomas-de-Pierreville, former municipality now part of Pierreville, Quebec, Canada

=== France ===
- Saint-Thomas, Aisne, France
- Saint-Thomas, Haute-Garonne, France

=== United Kingdom ===
- St Thomas, Exeter, United Kingdom
- St Thomas, Swansea, United Kingdom
- St. Thomas (electoral ward), Swansea, Wales
- St Thomas the Apostle Rural, a civil parish in Cornwall, United Kingdom

=== United States ===
- Saint Thomas, Indiana, an unincorporated community
- St. Thomas, Minnesota
- St. Thomas, Missouri
- St. Thomas, Nevada, a sunken town
- St. Thomas, North Dakota
- St. Thomas Township, Pennsylvania
- Saint Thomas, U.S. Virgin Islands, an island in the Caribbean Sea
  - Saint Thomas (Brandenburg colony), a former settlement on this island

=== West Indies region ===
- Saint Thomas, Barbados
  - Saint Thomas (Barbados Parliament constituency)
- Saint Thomas Parish, Jamaica, once known as Saint Thomas in the East
- Saint Thomas, U.S. Virgin Islands

=== Elsewhere ===
- St. Thomas Island (Bulgaria), Bulgaria
- Sankt Thomas, Germany, a village in Rhineland-Palatinate
- St. Thomas Mount, a hillock in Chennai, India where, according to tradition, the biblical Thomas the Apostle was killed
- St. Thomas (County Dublin), a civil parish incorporating Jobstown, Ireland
- San Tomás (St. Thomas), former name of San Benedicto Island, Mexico
- São Tomé (St. Thomas), an island in São Tomé and Príncipe
- Saint Thomas's Gate, also known as Bab Tuma, a district of Damascus, Syria
- St Thomas de Guyana, or St Thomas of Oronoque, is today Ciudad Bolívar on the Orinoco River in Venezuela

== Institutions ==
=== India ===
- St. Thomas College, Kozhencherry, Kozhencherry, Kerala, India
- St Thomas College of Engineering and Technology, Kannur, Kerala, India
- St. Thomas College, Palai, Kerala, India
- St. Thomas College, Thrissur, Kerala, India
- St. Thomas' College, Dehradun, secondary school in Dehradun, Uttarakhand, India
- St. Thomas Higher Secondary School, Kozhencherry, Kerala, India

=== Sri Lanka ===
- S. Thomas' College, Bandarawela, a private school
- S. Thomas' College, Gurutalawa, a private Christian school
- St. Thomas' College, Kotte, a Catholic school
- St. Thomas' College, Matale, a secondary school
- St. Thomas' College, Matara, a government school for boys
- S. Thomas' College, Mount Lavinia, a private Anglican school
- S. Thomas' Preparatory School, Kollupitiya, a private Anglican school

=== United States ===
- Saint Thomas Academy, a high school in Minnesota
- Saint Thomas Choir School, New York, New York
- St. Thomas University (Florida), Miami, Florida
- St. Thomas University School of Law, Miami, Florida
- St. Thomas' Episcopal School, Houston, TX
- University of Scranton, Scranton, Pennsylvania, founded in 1888 as St. Thomas College, renamed in 1938
- University of St. Thomas (Minnesota), St. Paul, Minnesota
- University of St. Thomas (Texas) Houston, Texas
- St. Thomas-St. John School District, US Virgin Islands

=== New Zealand ===
- St Thomas of Canterbury College, Christchurch, Canterbury

== Music ==
- "St. Thomas" (song), a jazz composition by saxophonist Sonny Rollins
- St. Thomas: Tribute to Great Tenors, a 1991 album by the New York Unit
- Thomas Hansen (musician) (1976–2007), Norwegian musician who performed under the name Saint Thomas
- A hymn composed by Aaron Williams

== Sports ==
- St. Thomas Bobcats, athletic program of St. Thomas University in Florida
- St. Thomas Celts, athletic program of the University of St. Thomas in Texas
- St. Thomas Tommies (Canada), athletic program of St. Thomas University in New Brunswick
- St. Thomas Tommies (Minnesota), athletic program of St. Thomas University in Minnesota

== Other uses ==
- Saint Thomas Christians, an ancient community of Christians from Kerala, India
- St Thomas' Hospital, Southwark
- St. Thomas University (New Brunswick), Fredericton, New Brunswick, Canada
- Thomasleeha or St. Thomas, a 1975 Malayalam historical film about Thomas the Apostle in India

== See also ==
- Santo Tomas (disambiguation)
- St. Thomas' Church (disambiguation)
- St. Thomas Hospital (disambiguation)
- St. Thomas station (disambiguation)
- St Thomas Street (disambiguation)
