= Choros =

Choros may refer to:

- Choros (Oirats), a Mongolic people and historical clan
- Chôros, a series of compositions by Heitor Villa-Lobos
- Choros (dance), Greek dances
- Choros (Greek drama), an ancient Greek group of performers
- Choros District, a subdivision of Cutervo, Peru
- Choros (island), one of the islands of the Pingüino de Humboldt National Reserve, Chile

== See also ==
- Choro
- Khoros (disambiguation)
