= Pimpingos District =

Pimpingos
- District
- Interactive map of Pimpingos
- Country: Peru
- Region: Cajamarca
- Province: Cutervo
- Capital: Pimpingos

Government
  - Mayor: Joselito Gonzales Perales

Area
  - Total: 186.04 km^{2} (71.83 sq mi)
- Elevation: 1,720 m (5,640 ft)

Population (2005 census)
  - Total: 6,196
  - Density: 33.30/km^{2} (86.26/sq mi)
- Time zone: UTC-5 (PET)
- UBIGEO: 060606

Pimpingos District is one of fifteen districts of the Cutervo Province in the Cajamarca Region in Peru. It was created on 22 October 1910 by Law No. 1296. It is one of the oldest districts of the province.

== Geography ==
It is located approximately between 06°37′35″S and 06°44′50″S and between 78°39′10″W and 78°46′50″W.

- Location: northwest of the city of Cutervo
- Population 6 196 inhabitants.
- Capital: Pimpingos located at 1 720 m. Snm
- Climate: Mild.
- Area: Yunga, Quechua

=== Hunting ===
00	Hamlet	2002 Population	-	01	Michino	580	-	02	Condorhuasi	492	-	03	Anise	440	-	04	Pandalle	386	-	05	Guayaquil	381	-	06	Panama	320	-	07	The Cantor	318	-	08	New Alliance	300	-	09	White House	294	-	10	The Avocado	281	-	11	Pucalá	281	-	12	San Lorenzo	281	-	13	The Winner	264	-	14	La Esperanza	253	-	15	The Union	201	-	16	Freedom Lemon	190	-	17	Barbasco	190	-	18	El Naranjo	183	-	19	Lima Barbasco	172	-	20	Playa Hermosa	172	-	21	Palturco	170	-	22	El Mirador	152	-	23	The Vine	130	-	24	Progress	108	-	25	San Jose	102	-	26	New Ilucán	101	-	27	The Laurel	85	-	28	Cuica	80	-	29	Vista Alegre	71	-	30	La Laguna	39

- Limits:

North: With Colasay Chora district and the province of Jaén.

East: In the districts of Toribio Casanova and St. Thomas.

South: In the districts of Santo Tomas and San Andrés.

West: In the district of Santa Cruz de Cutervo.

== Economic Activities ==
- Crops: coffee, cassava, sugarcane, parsnips, rice, yellow corn, fruit trees, and pastures.
- Livestock: Cattle, pigs, horses, poultry. Their average milk / cow / day is 5.6 liters.
- Agribusiness: Derived from sugarcane llonque, dairy products: cheese.

== Demographics ==
The district has a population of approximately 6,196 inhabitants by 2005, which has the following structure of the population, it reflects a larger composition that falls in children and young people.

- Population 6,196 inhabitants (2006)
- Density 33.3 hab./km2

Pimping is an area of 186.04 km2, representing 6.1% of the total Provincial. The population density is 41.66 inhabitants per km2. In the area of the department represents 0.56% of the total area.

Population density Pimping District, is below the density of the province and beyond departmental and national density

Pimping The District has 30 villages, of which 2 have the status of Minor Population Centers: Condorhuasi White House.

The Province Cutervo, representing 10.2% of the total population of Department of Cajamarca and Pimping represents 5.3% of the total population of the Province of Cutervo.

Cajamarca is the most rural department in the country, reaching a rate of 72%. It is also the third most populous department in the country, with a rate of 5.7%

== History ==
Building Official: Law No. 1296 October 22, 1910 became part of the province of Cutervo, dismembered Jaén.

Pimping The village also has a special place in the history of Peru by the Peruvian territory have been integrated using the international rights of Self-Determination of Peoples and utiposidetes in 1830.

Pimping The word is in the geographical map, drawn by the Spanish, assigned as the receipt of real lace Marañón River that has been made in the late 18th century to prevent the illicit removal of snuff Bracamoros that produced the Provinces Jaén and Chachapoyas, won by Don Alonso de Alvarado for the years of 1553.

The territory of present Pimping District, belonged to the Pre-Hispanic chiefdom Ethnicity and Huambo, which were conquered by the Inca and then by the Spanish invaders.

When Don José de San Martín reaches the Peru and proclaims independence, the peoples of Pimping and Choros join the cry for freedom in the city of Jaén de Bracamoros, later Simón Bolívar, a patriotic cry merit of these peoples, the District amounts to class, not knowing the exact date of his political creation, belonging to the province Chota in 1857.

On October 22, 1910, Law No. 1290, establishing the Province Cutervo and the District of Pimping, becomes part of this Province.

In 1928, 14 May, Pimping is hit by an earthquake, a total of 41 dying people, moving the settlers to build homes in a place called "El Calvario", where they remained for a period of three years since then the tremors occurred frequently. When earthquakes stopped, the villagers returned to the place of origin to rebuild their homes.

== Statistics ==
Features of the Population Census 2005

-	Population census	6196	-	Urban Population	431	-	Rural	5765	-	Men census population	3226	-	Women's registered population	2970	-	Intercensal Growth Rate (1981–1993)	0.4	-	Population 15 years and over	3600	-	Poblaciónde Percentage aged 15 and over	58.1	-	Illiteracy rate of population aged 15 and over	12.3	-	Percentage of population aged 15 years, Total with completed primary or less	41.9

Basic Services Housing Census 2005

-	Total Private Housing	1650	-	Households with Drain Service	53	-	Housing with electric lighting	49

Labor and Employment Indicators Census 1993

-	Economically Active Population (PEA) of 6 and over - Total	2237	-	Economically Active Population (PEA) of 6 and over - Women	1982	-	Economically Active Population (PEA) of 6 and over - Men	255	-	Economic activity rate of the labor force over 15 years	52.8	-	% Of poblac. occupied over 15 years - in agriculture	88.7	-	% Of poblac. occupied over 15 years - In services	10	-	% Of the employed population aged 15 and over - Employees	15.1

== Farmhouses ==
=== Panama Farmhouse ===
It is a community of 500 inhabitants. This is one of the villages with more development in recent years, as have services such as water, electricity transport and Education. Also has communal house, church, medical posts, schools No. 16420, Initial School, Central Square and secondary schools, although currently in a school building very modern noble material.

This institution, the National College "Mariano Melgar", was created on October 2, anniversary date, its promoter and first director was Professor Oswaldo Salazar Fernandez, who made possible the first high school this area, in this study people in different locations in the region.

There are also several projects such as drainage, park and tennis, making it one of the main villages of the province Cutervo.

His feast day is done on August 30 of each year devoted to Santa Rosa, where people come from different places, mostly cities delas Lima, Chicago and Jaén, in addition to other villages in that region as a winner, San Lorenzo, anise, Sacilia, El Cantor, Perlamayo, Santa Lucia, Choros, Pimping, San Pedro, El Rollo, Mesarrume, San Pablo, etc.; performed this dance, burning castles, a fair and sporting activities. In addition to selling an excellent cattle.

=== El Palto Farmhouse ===
It is a community made up of a population of 450 inhabitants about youth organizations like the marching band "Santa Rosa de Lima", medical post, school, and other community organizations, struggling to get forward to the community.

It has passable road, which links communities Pucalá, New Alliance, Mirador, Condorhuasi, La Union, Pandalle. It is a very important way to transport their products agricultural to markets in the area.

His feast day held in honor of "Santa Rosa de Lima" on August 30 of each year. The celebration takes place through cultural, sporting, religious and social, which brings together all people from nearby communities and immigrants living in different Peru cities. It reminds one of the major characters Don Polidoro Fernández, great partner and manager of the community and other characters like Mr. Juan Rafael, Second Silva, Flavio Foncesa, Prof. Ever Neyra, James Guerrero, among others.

=== Michino Farmhouse ===
The hamlet of darling is one of the strongest in terms of production refers to `bring bread is so is that caters to the entire district with vegetables and tubers sold in the district on Sundays.
