= Saint Thomas Hickman Hospital =

Ascension Saint Thomas Hickman Hospital

Geography
- Location: 135 East Swan Street,, Centerville, Tennessee, United States
- Coordinates: 35.7797°N 87.4592°W

Organization
- Care system: Private
- Type: Non-private

Services
- Standards: JCAHO accreditation

History
- Founded: 1964

Links
- Website: healthcare.ascension.org/locations/tennessee/tnnas/centerville-ascension-saint-thomas-hickman
- Lists: Hospitals in Tennessee

Ascension Saint Thomas Hickman Hospital, formerly Hickman Community Hospital, Saint Thomas Hickman Hospital, originally Hickman County Hospital, is a not-for-profit hospital in Centerville, Tennessee, United States.

It was the first hospital in Tennessee to qualify as a Critical Access Hospital. Its specialty clinics include eye care, gastroenterology, cardiology, urology and orthopedics. Complete ancillary services consist of physical therapy, cardiopulmonary services with full pulmonary function testing, and radiology with CAT scan and echocardiography capabilities.

Saint Thomas Hickman Hospital employs approximately 150 people and includes a nursing home (ICF), two physician clinics, an affiliated home health agency, and an outpatient geriatric psychiatry program.

Saint Thomas Hickman Hospital is part of Ascension Healthcare System, a Catholic-related healthcare group which also includes Saint Thomas West Hospital, Saint Thomas Midtown Hospital and Saint Thomas Hospital for Specialty Surgery in Nashville, Saint Thomas Rutherford Hospital in Murfreesboro, Saint Thomas DeKalb Hospital in Smithville, Tennessee, Saint Thomas River Park Hospital in McMinnville, Saint Thomas Stones River Hospital in Woodbury and Saint Thomas Highlands Hospital in Sparta. Saint Thomas Health is part of Ascension Health, the largest Catholic health care system in the United States.

== History ==
Saint Thomas Hickman Hospital was established in 1964 as Hickman County Hospital through a 17-acre (6.9-hectare) land donation by the Huddleston family of Centerville, Tennessee, and federal Hill-Burton Funds.

Over its history, Saint Thomas Hickman Hospital has expanded its services to include a local home health program and become the first hospital in Tennessee to qualify as a Critical Access Hospital. In 1996, Baptist Hospital of Nashville purchased the hospital and the name was changed to Baptist Hickman Community Hospital. In January 2002, Hickman Community Hospital became a member of Saint Thomas Health Services when this group assumed the operation of Baptist. In 2013, its name was changed to Saint Thomas Hickman Hospital in a rebranding in which the use of the "Baptist" name was terminated group-wide.

== Hospital services ==
- Primary care clinics
- Home health
- Nursing home
- Emergency services
- Diagnostic imaging
- Senior care
- Physical therapy
- Cardiopulmonary services
- Specialty clinics
