= Ascension Saint Thomas =

Healthcare organization in Nashville, Tennessee

- Company type: Subsidiary
- Industry: Health Care
- Founded: 1898
- Headquarters: Nashville, Tennessee, U.S., United States
- Area served: Middle Tennessee, South Central Kentucky
- Key people: Fahad Tahir (President & CEO)
- Parent: Ascension
- Website: healthcare.ascension.org/saint-thomas

Ascension Saint Thomas is a healthcare system in Tennessee. The Ascension Saint Thomas President and CEO is Fahad Tahir.

== Hospital locations ==
The following is a list of Ascension Saint Thomas Health hospitals, all in Tennessee:

Hospital	City	County	Staffed beds	Notes
Ascension Saint Thomas Hospital West	Nashville	Davidson	643	Formerly known as Saint Thomas Hospital
Ascension Saint Thomas Hospital Midtown	Nashville	Davidson	396	Formerly known as Baptist Hospital
Ascension Saint Thomas Rutherford	Murfreesboro	Rutherford	354	Formerly known as Middle Tennessee Medical Center
Ascension Saint Thomas Rutherford Westlawn	Murfreesboro	Rutherford		Satellite location of Ascension Saint Thomas Rutherford
Ascension Saint Thomas Hickman	Centerville	Hickman		
Ascension Saint Thomas River Park	McMinnville	Warren	82	
Ascension Saint Thomas DeKalb	Smithville	DeKalb	18	
Ascension Saint Thomas Stones River	Woodbury	Cannon	43	
Ascension Saint Thomas Highlands	Sparta	White	26	
Ascension Saint Thomas Three Rivers	Waverly	Humphreys		
Ascension Saint Thomas Hospital for Specialty Surgery	Nashville	Davidson	23	
Ascension Saint Thomas Behavioral Health Hospital	Nashville	Davidson		Joint venture partnership between Ascension Saint Thomas and Acadia Healthcare
Ascension Saint Thomas Rehabilitation Hospital	Nashville	Davidson		Joint venture partnership between Ascension Saint Thomas and Kindred Healthcare
Highpoint Health - Sumner Station	Gallatin	Sumner		Joint venture partnership between Ascension Saint Thomas and LifePoint Health
Highpoint Health - Riverview	Carthage	Smith		Joint venture partnership between Ascension Saint Thomas and LifePoint Health
Highpoint Health - Trousdale	Hartsville	Trousdale		Joint venture partnership between Ascension Saint Thomas and LifePoint Health
Highpoint Health - Sumner	Gallatin	Sumner		Joint venture partnership between Ascension Saint Thomas and LifePoint Health
Highpoint Health - Sewanee	Sewanee	Franklin		Joint venture partnership between Ascension Saint Thomas and LifePoint Health
Highpoint Health - Winchester	Winchester	Franklin		Joint venture partnership between Ascension Saint Thomas and LifePoint Health
