= Santa Cruz District, Cutervo =

Coordinates: 6.6253°S 78.9438°W

Santa Cruz
- District
- Interactive map of Santa Cruz
- Country: Peru
- Region: Cajamarca
- Province: Cutervo
- Founded: December 10, 1959
- Capital: Santa Cruz

Government
  - Mayor: Hernando Perez Silva

Area
  - Total: 128 km^{2} (49 sq mi)
- Elevation: 2,035 m (6,677 ft)

Population (2005 census)
  - Total: 3,372
  - Density: 26.3/km^{2} (68.2/sq mi)
- Time zone: UTC-5 (PET)
- UBIGEO: 060611

Santa Cruz District is one of fifteen districts of the province Cutervo in Peru.
