= La Ramada District =

Coordinates: 6.2524°S 78.5760°W

La Ramada
- District
- Interactive map of La Ramada
- Country: Peru
- Region: Cajamarca
- Province: Cutervo
- Founded: October 6, 1961
- Capital: La Ramada

Government
  - Mayor: José Jairo Villegas Uriarte

Area
  - Total: 30.27 km^{2} (11.69 sq mi)
- Elevation: 1,100 m (3,600 ft)

Population (2005 census)
  - Total: 4,695
  - Density: 155.1/km^{2} (401.7/sq mi)
- Time zone: UTC-5 (PET)
- UBIGEO: 060605

La Ramada District is one of fifteen districts of the province Cutervo in Peru.
