= Socota District =

Coordinates: 6.3164°S 78.6987°W

Socota
- District
- Interactive map of Socota
- Country: Peru
- Region: Cajamarca
- Province: Cutervo
- Founded: February 5, 1875
- Capital: Socota

Area
  - Total: 134.83 km^{2} (52.06 sq mi)
- Elevation: 1,800 m (5,900 ft)

Population (2005 census)
  - Total: 11,297
  - Density: 83.787/km^{2} (217.01/sq mi)
- Time zone: UTC-5 (PET)
- UBIGEO: 060614

Socota District is one of fifteen districts of the province Cutervo in Peru.
