= Cutervo province =

Coordinates: 6°22′12″S 78°49′12″W

Cutervo
- Province
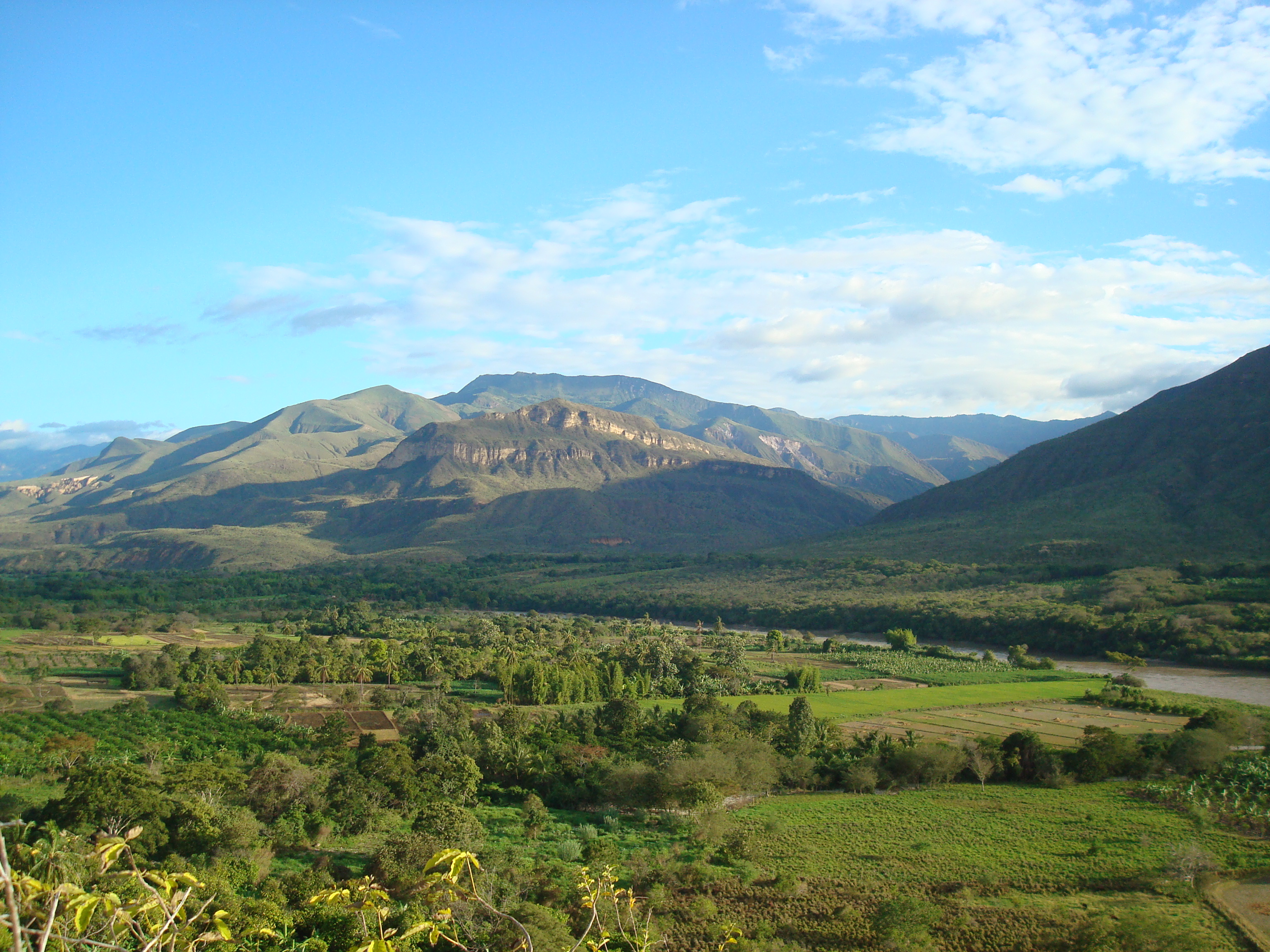
- Santo Tomás District (in the background), Toribio Casanova District (on the right) and Marañón River as seen from near Tactago (Cumba District, Utcubamba Province)

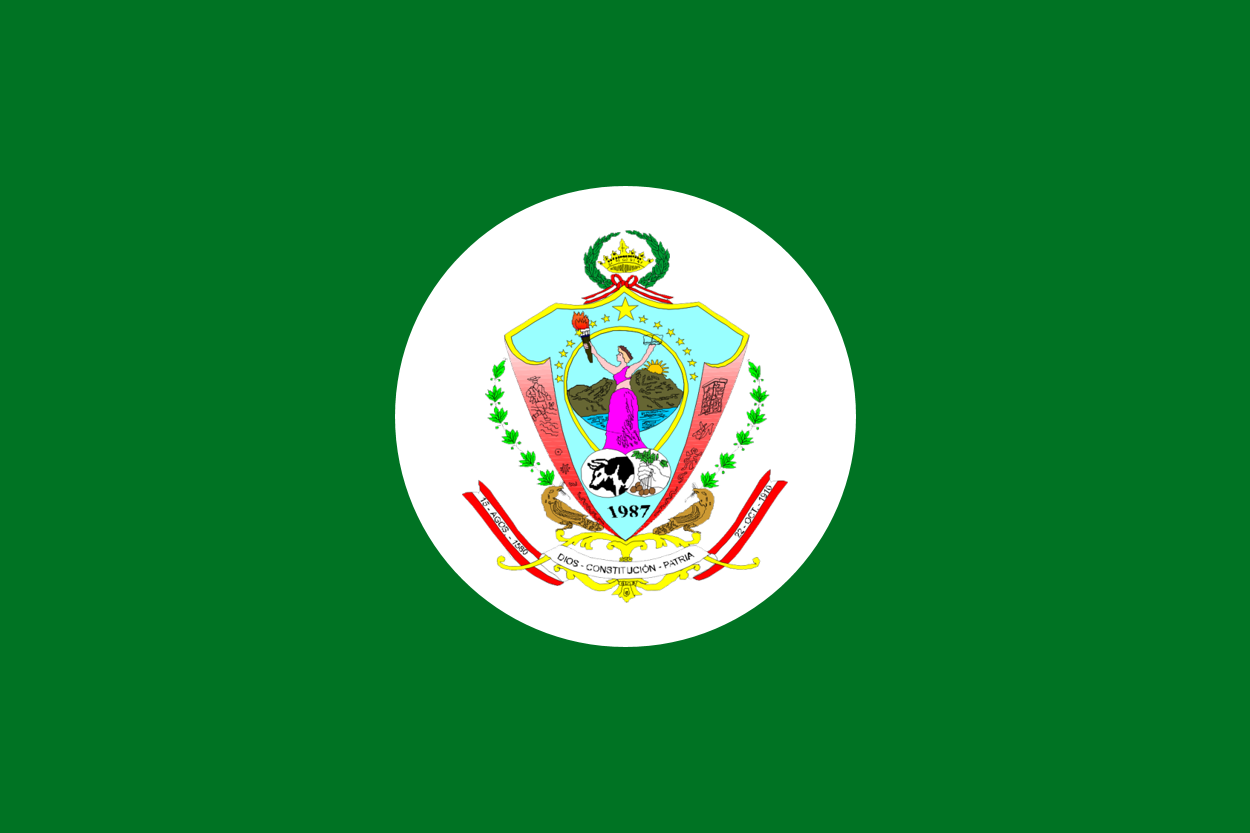
- Flag Coat of arms

- Location of Cutervo in the Cajamarca Region
- Country: Peru
- Region: Cajamarca
- Capital: Cutervo

Government
  - Mayor: Anibel Pedraza

Area
  - Total: 3,028.46 km^{2} (1,169.29 sq mi)

Population
  - Total: 142,533
  - Density: 47.0645/km^{2} (121.897/sq mi)
- UBIGEO: 0606

Cutervo is one of the thirteen provinces that make up the Cajamarca Region of Peru. It is the home of the Cutervo National Park. It has a population of 162,686 and an area 3,028.46 square kilometers (1,169.29 sq mi).

== Boundaries ==
- North: Province of Jaén
- East: Amazonas Region
- South: Chota Province
- West: Lambayeque Region

== Political division ==
It is divided into fifteen districts:

- Cutervo
- Callayuc
- Choros
- Cujillo
- La Ramada
- Pimpingos
- Querocotillo
- San Andrés de Cutervo
- San Juan de Cutervo
- San Luis de Lucma
- Santa Cruz
- Santo Domingo de la Capilla
- Santo Tomás
- Socota
- Toribio Casanova

== See also ==
- Cajamarca Region
- Cutervo National Park
- Peru
