= San Juan de Cutervo District =

Coordinates: 6.1742°S 78.5986°W

San Juan de Cutervo
- District
- Interactive map of San Juan de Cutervo
- Country: Peru
- Region: Cajamarca
- Province: Cutervo
- Founded: August 8, 1960
- Capital: San Juan de Cutervo

Government
  - Mayor: Manuel Olano Villalobos

Area
  - Total: 60.87 km^{2} (23.50 sq mi)
- Elevation: 2,070 m (6,790 ft)

Population (2005 census)
  - Total: 2,371
  - Density: 38.95/km^{2} (100.9/sq mi)
- Time zone: UTC-5 (PET)
- UBIGEO: 060609

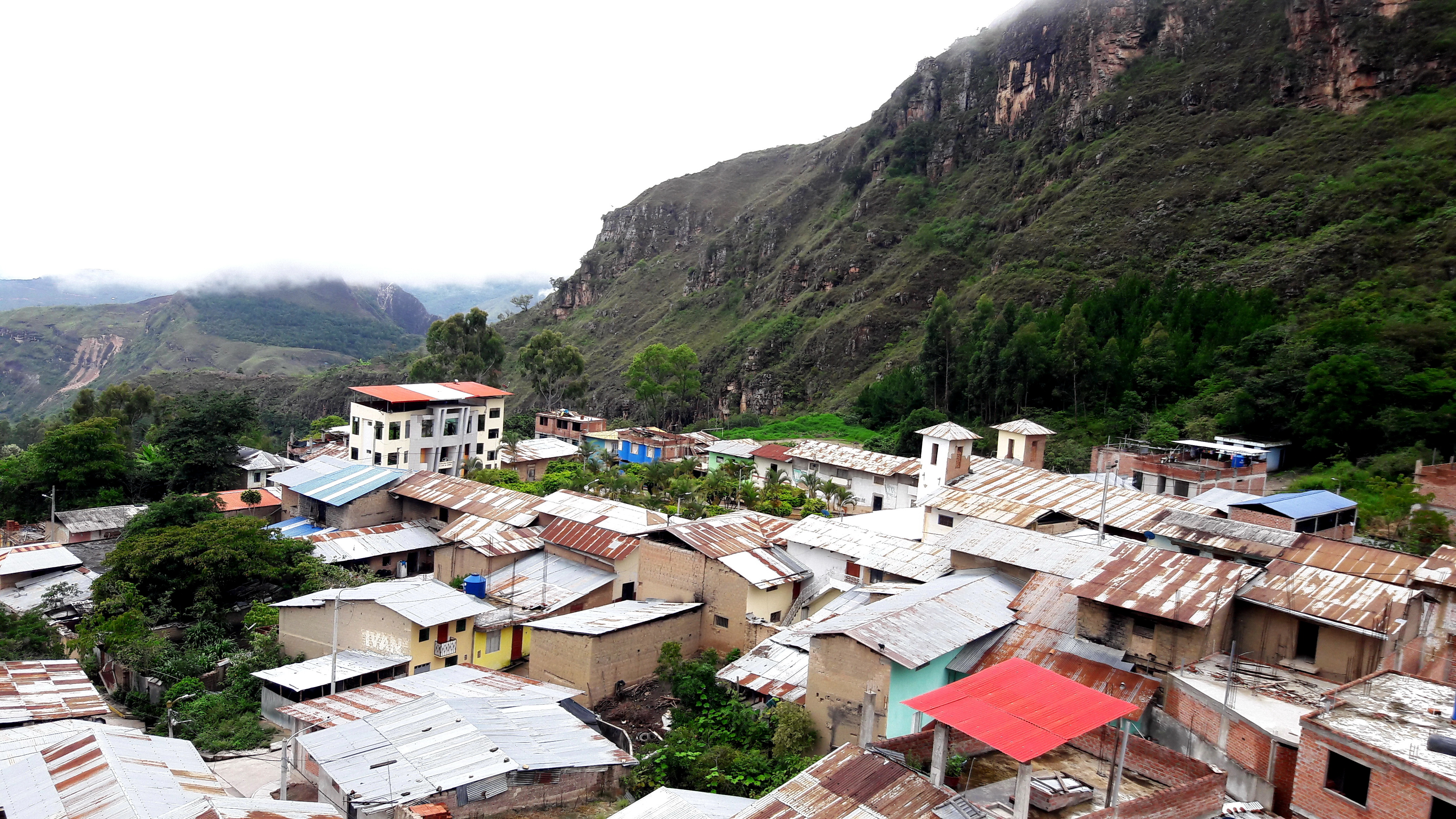
Aerial view of San Juan

San Juan de Cutervo District is one of fifteen districts of the province Cutervo in Peru.
