= Toribio Casanova District =

Coordinates: 5.9516°S 78.7355°W

Toribio Casanova
- District
- Interactive map of Toribio Casanova
- Country: Peru
- Region: Cajamarca
- Province: Cutervo
- Founded: November 19, 1954
- Capital: La Sacilia

Government
  - Mayor: Demetrio Perez Huaman

Area
  - Total: 40.65 km^{2} (15.70 sq mi)
- Elevation: 1,000 m (3,300 ft)

Population (2005 census)
  - Total: 1,589
  - Density: 39.09/km^{2} (101.2/sq mi)
- Time zone: UTC-5 (PET)
- UBIGEO: 060615

Toribio Casanova District is one of the fifteen districts of the province Cutervo in Peru.
