= Es Migjorn Gran =

- Municipality
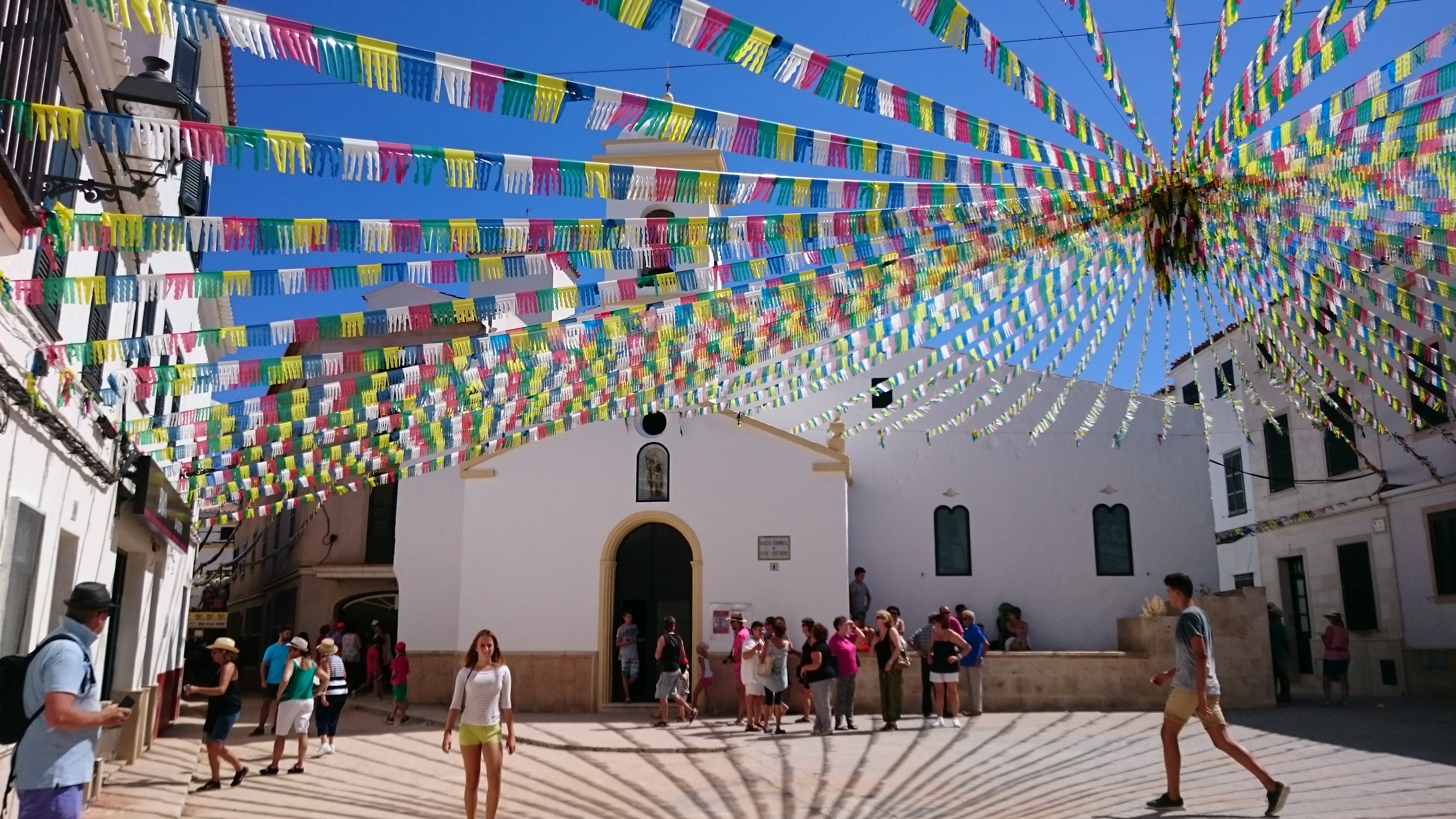
- Es Migjorn Gran parish church

- Coat of arms

- Location within Menorca

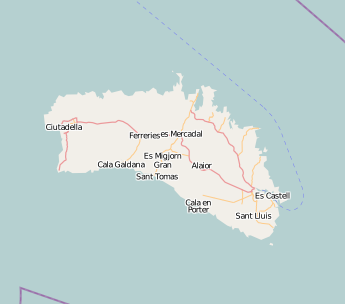
- Location in Menorca Es Migjorn Gran (Balearic Islands) Es Migjorn Gran (Spain)
- Coordinates: 39°56′43″N 4°02′56″E
- Country: Spain
- Autonomous community: Balearic Islands
- Province: Balearic Islands

Population (2025-01-01)
  - Total: 1,765
- Time zone: UTC+1 (CET)
  - Summer (DST): UTC+2 (CEST)

Es Migjorn Gran (Balearic Catalan: [əz miˈdʒoɾn ˈgɾan]) is a small municipality in southern Menorca in the Spanish Balearic Islands. Formerly incorporated into the municipality of Es Mercadal, it is currently the island's newest and second-smallest municipal district. The main inland village of Es Migjorn Gran is surrounded by small pine-clad hills, and the coast is home to a small variety of tourist resorts and unspoilt beaches, Sant Tomàs being the principal resort. There are many 'calas' or coves that are encompassed by pine-covered cliffs along the coast, where there are small sandy beaches only accessible by foot or by sea, which mean they are very rarely busy.

Es Migjorn Gran borders the municipality of Ciutadella, Ferreries, Es Mercadal and Alaior. Nearby are the resorts of Son Bou and Cala Galdana, the latter being the most-photographed bay in Europe. It was the hometown of Joan Riudavets, the oldest Spanish citizen on record.

== History ==
Es Migjorn Gran began as a modest rural settlement in the 18th century and was initially part of the district of Es Mercadal. In 1989, the surrounding area of Es Migjorn Gran was established as an independent municipality, making it one of the newest and smallest on the islands. Historically, Es Migjorn has been a tranquil village characterized by narrow streets and a handful of tapas bars. The focal point of the village is the small church of San Cristobal located in the town center, serving as its primary landmark.

Comparable to other regions of Menorca, Es Migjorn district is home to several prehistoric sites, notably abandoned settlements known as talaiots and caves in the hillsides.

== Geography ==
Situated in the central south of Menorca, Es Migjorn Gran is one of the principal towns not situated on the main Mahón–Ciutadella road.

== Demographics ==
The municipality is very sparsely populated, with only one major resort and an inland town.
