= Khoros =

Khoros may refer to:

- Khoros (city), better known as Cyrrhus, an ancient city in Syria
- Khoros (dance), one of Greek dances
- Khoros, LLC, American software company

== See also ==
- Koros (disambiguation)
- Choros (disambiguation)
