= St. Thomas railway station =

St. Thomas railway station may refer to:

- Canada Southern Railway Station, a former station in St. Thomas, Ontario, Canada
- Exeter St Thomas railway station, in Exeter, England
- Fontpédrouse-Saint-Thomas-les-Bains station, in Fontpédrouse, Occitanie, France
- St. Thomas Mount railway station, in Chennai, Tamil Nadu, India
- Swansea St Thomas railway station, a former station in Swansea, West Glamorgan, Wales

== See also ==
- Saint Thomas (disambiguation)
