= San Luis de Lucma District =

Coordinates: 6.2939°S 78.6035°W

San Luis de Lucma
- District
- Interactive map of San Luis de Lucma
- Country: Peru
- Region: Cajamarca
- Province: Cutervo
- Founded: April 8, 1929
- Capital: San Luis de Lucma

Government
  - Mayor: Santos Delgado Fernandez

Area
  - Total: 109.74 km^{2} (42.37 sq mi)
- Elevation: 1,850 m (6,070 ft)

Population (2005 census)
  - Total: 4,119
  - Density: 37.53/km^{2} (97.21/sq mi)
- Time zone: UTC-5 (PET)
- UBIGEO: 060610

San Luis de Lucma District is one of fifteen districts of the province Cutervo in Peru.
