= St Thomas Street =

St Thomas Street, or St Thomas' Street, may refer to:

- St Thomas' Street, Oxford, England
- St Thomas Street, Southwark, London, England

== See also ==
- Saint Thomas (disambiguation)
