= Querocotillo District =

Coordinates: 6.3596°S 79.0346°W

Querocotillo
- District
- Interactive map of Querocotillo
- Country: Peru
- Region: Cajamarca
- Province: Cutervo
- Capital: Querocotillo

Area
  - Total: 697.1 km^{2} (269.2 sq mi)
- Elevation: 1,973 m (6,473 ft)

Population (2005 census)
  - Total: 16,458
  - Density: 23.61/km^{2} (61.15/sq mi)
- Time zone: UTC-5 (PET)
- UBIGEO: 060607

Querocotillo District is one of fifteen districts of the province Cutervo in Peru.
