= Saint Thomas Rutherford Hospital =

Saint Thomas Rutherford Hospital (formerly Middle Tennessee Medical Center)

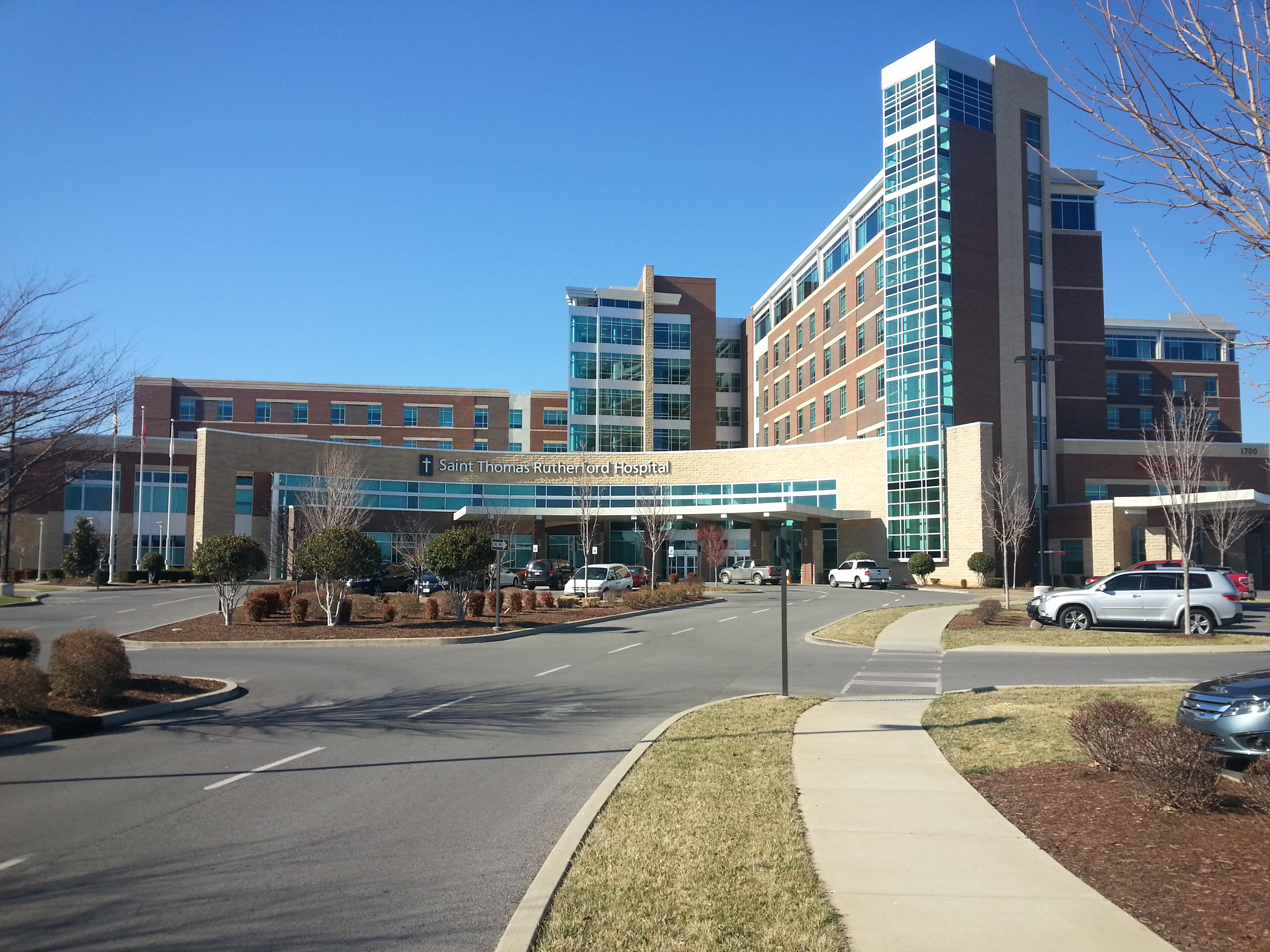

Geography
- Location: 1700 Medical Center Parkway, Murfreesboro, Tennessee, United States
- Coordinates: 35°51′39″N 86°25′28″W

Organization
- Care system: Private
- Type: Non-profit

Services
- Standards: JCAHO accreditation
- Beds: 418

History
- Founded: 1927 (as Rutherford Hospital)

Links
- Website: www.sthrutherford.com
- Lists: Hospitals in the United States

Saint Thomas Rutherford Hospital, formerly Middle Tennessee Medical Center, is a 418-bed private, not-for-profit hospital located in Murfreesboro, Tennessee, United States. Saint Thomas Rutherford Hospital is a member of Ascension Saint Thomas.

The hospital spent more than $30 million in care on uninsured patients in fiscal year 2009.

== The New MTMC ==
In 2006, MTMC announced plans to build a new 286-bed hospital to replace its 80-year-old facility. Groundbreaking festivities were held in early 2008, followed by a topping out ceremony six months later.

The 556,361-square-foot (51,687.6 m^{2}) facility is the focal point of a 68.5-acre (27.7 ha) medical campus. Two patient towers contain 286 all-private patient rooms. Other features include a 32-bed intensive care unit, a 21,000-square-foot (2,000 m^{2}) emergency department, expanded maternity services, and a surgical suite with 10 operating rooms.

Total cost for the construction project was estimated at $267 million. Completion was originally scheduled for Aug. 2, 2010, with reports in fall 2009 that the project was ahead of schedule and construction wrapping up by June 15, 2010. New patients were admitted starting Oct. 2, 2010.

== Saint Thomas Heart ==
The cardiology doctor groups of the then-four hospitals of Ascension Saint Thomas, (Saint Thomas Hospital, Baptist Hospital, Middle Tennessee Medical Center and Hickman Community Hospital) combined in 2007 to form Saint Thomas Heart. The group works with clinics and health care facilities throughout Middle Tennessee and Southern Kentucky in more than 20 counties.

== Chest Pain Network ==
The Saint Thomas Chest Pain Network is a division of Ascension Saint Thomas that coordinates with local emergency medical services (EMS) and hospitals to provide cardiac care services. The Chest Pain Network includes 15 hospitals in Tennessee and Kentucky, all accredited by the Society of Chest Pain Centers.

The Saint Thomas Chest Pain Network covers Tennessee and Southern Kentucky. Members of the network include:

- Saint Thomas Hospital (Nashville, Tennessee)
- Baptist Hospital (Nashville, Tennessee)
- Saint Thomas Rutherford Hospital (Murfreesboro, Tennessee)
- Hickman Community Hospital (Centerville, Tennessee)
- Livingston Regional Hospital (Livingston, Tennessee)
- Henry County Medical Center (Paris, Tennessee)
- Southern Tennessee Medical Center (Winchester, Tennessee)
- Cumberland Medical Center (Crossville, Tennessee)
- Crockett Hospital (Lawrenceburg, Tennessee)
- Hardin Medical Center (Savannah, Tennessee)
- Monroe County Medical Center (Tompkinsville, Kentucky)
- Lincoln Medical Center (Fayetteville, Tennessee)
- Decatur County General Hospital (Parsons, Tennessee)
- Harton Regional Medical Center (Tullahoma, Tennessee)
- Jackson Purchase Medical Center (Mayfield, Kentucky)

== Neurosciences Institute ==
The Ascension Saint Thomas Neurosciences Institute is among the Nashville area's most comprehensive brain, back, nervous system and spine centers.

Among the ailments and diseases treated through the Neurosciences Institute are epilepsy, stroke, brain tumors, ALS, sleep disorders, spine injuries, multiple sclerosis, chronic pain and Parkinson's disease. In 2012, MTMC opened the area's first Epilepsy Monitoring Unit.

The Saint Thomas Brain & Spine Tumor Center is a collaboration between the Neurosciences Institute and the Dan Rudy Cancer Center. Saint Thomas uses the Novalis Shaped Beam Surgery System, an advanced stereostatic radiotherapy treatment that focuses radiation to the shape of the tumor and results in minimum damage to surrounding tissue. The Ascension Saint Thomas Neurosciences Institute is the only health care center in Tennessee to provide Novalis Shaped Beam Surgery.

== Bariatric Program ==
The Bariatric Program at Saint Thomas Rutherford Hospital provides a variety of weight loss procedures to assist in the treatment of morbid obesity, diabetes, high blood pressure, sleep apnea, arthritis, asthma, acid reflux, infertility and high cholesterol. These bariatric procedures include the Laparoscopic Adjustable Gastric Band (LAP-BAND) System, Laparoscopic Roux-en-Y Gastric Bypass, Open or Laparoscopic Duodenal Switch and Laparoscopic Sleeve Gastrectomy.

== Orthopedics ==
Saint Thomas Rutherford Hospital provides a number of orthopedic services at its own facility and through its family of Ascension Saint Thomas hospitals. In 2008, the program was ranked in the top 5% in the nation for spine surgery by HealthGrades. Saint Thomas Orthopedics also received five-star ratings for overall orthopedic services, spine surgery, joint replacement, total knee replacement, back and neck surgery, and spinal fusion.

== Sports medicine ==
A specialized extension of its orthopedic program, Baptist Sports Medicine combines several services under its umbrella, including general orthopedics, physical therapy, aquatic therapy, athletic medicine and occupational therapy. Baptist Sports Medicine is the exclusive health care provider to the Tennessee Titans, Tennessee Secondary School Athletic Association and Lipscomb University.

In 2007, Baptist Sports Medicine managing director Trent Nessler headed a research team to evaluate screening tests and evaluate their predictive value for athletic injury when used as a pre-assessment tool.

Baptist Sports Medicine clinics can be found throughout Middle Tennessee, with locations in downtown Nashville, Antioch, Bellevue, Brentwood, Centerville, Green Hills, Murfreesboro, Pleasant View, Rivergate and Spring Hill, as well as at Lipscomb University.

== Life Therapies ==
The Life Therapies offers specialized rehabilitation therapy services in a relaxed, non-hospital atmosphere. Because the recovery process can be an emotionally difficult experience, Life Therapies services are located in clinics that are designed as a comfortable environment conducive to healing.

Life Therapies clinics offer services for a variety of stages in a patient's life, including treatment of lymphedema, and neurological, post-stroke, vestibular, pediatric, oncology and women's health issues. Until January 2009, the Life Therapies services were provided under the umbrella of Baptist Sports Medicine. It was determined that creating the new Life Therapies service line would allow therapists and physicians to better treat patients that don't require traditional sports medicine.

The six clinics are found throughout Middle Tennessee, including locations at Baptist Medical Plaza I in downtown Nashville, Green Hills, Maryland Farms YMCA in Brentwood, Spring Hill and two locations in Murfreesboro.

== Center for Pelvic Health ==
The Center for Pelvic Health is made up of a multidisciplinary team to diagnose and treat pelvic health disorders, focusing on chronic pain and incontinence. The center touts the use of unique treatments, such as non-surgical interventions (cystoscopy, urodynamics, colposcopy and tibial nerve stimulation), pelvic floor physical therapy (postural and pelvic floor muscle evaluation), and surgical treatment options (diagnostic laparoscopy, awake pain mapping, urethral slings and advanced robotic techniques).

The Center for Pelvic Health is a referral center and works with patients' primary care physicians for treatment.

== Women's health ==
The hospitals of Ascension Saint Thomas partner together to provide women's health services that range from gynecology and breast health to pelvic health and birthing services. A level III neonatal intensive care unit can be found at Saint Thomas Rutherford Hospital's sister site, Saint Thomas Midtown Hospital.

== Cancer program ==
The Ascension Saint Thomas Cancer Program uses treatments, therapies and education and prevention in the battle against cancer. An American College of Surgeons-accredited program, Saint Thomas Health provides treatment and prevention services for a number of forms of cancer, including brain, breast, cervical, colon, lung, ovarian, prostate, uterine and others.

As part of its treatment, the Ascension Saint Thomas Cancer Program partners with institutions, including Cleveland Clinic and Tennessee Oncology, to partake in community-based clinical trials in oncology and related therapies. This, along with a network of more than 44 physicians, allows Saint Thomas to identify innovative solutions for advanced patient care and improve outcomes for cancer patients.

In December 2008, Baptist Hospital's cancer program was recognized by the Commission on Cancer of the American College of Surgeons as offering the best in cancer care. Baptist Hospital received Three-Year Approval with Commendation from the Commission on Cancer.

== Partnership with MTSU ==
Saint Thomas Rutherford Hospital is the official healthcare provider for the Middle Tennessee State University athletics program.
