= Cujillo District =

Coordinates: 6.1070°S 78.5739°W

Cujillo
- District
- Interactive map of Cujillo
- Country: Peru
- Region: Cajamarca
- Province: Cutervo
- Capital: Cujillo

Government
  - Mayor: Juan Marrufo Alcantara

Area
  - Total: 108.93 km^{2} (42.06 sq mi)
- Elevation: 1,760 m (5,770 ft)

Population (2005 census)
  - Total: 2,998
  - Density: 27.52/km^{2} (71.28/sq mi)
- Time zone: UTC-5 (PET)
- UBIGEO: 060604

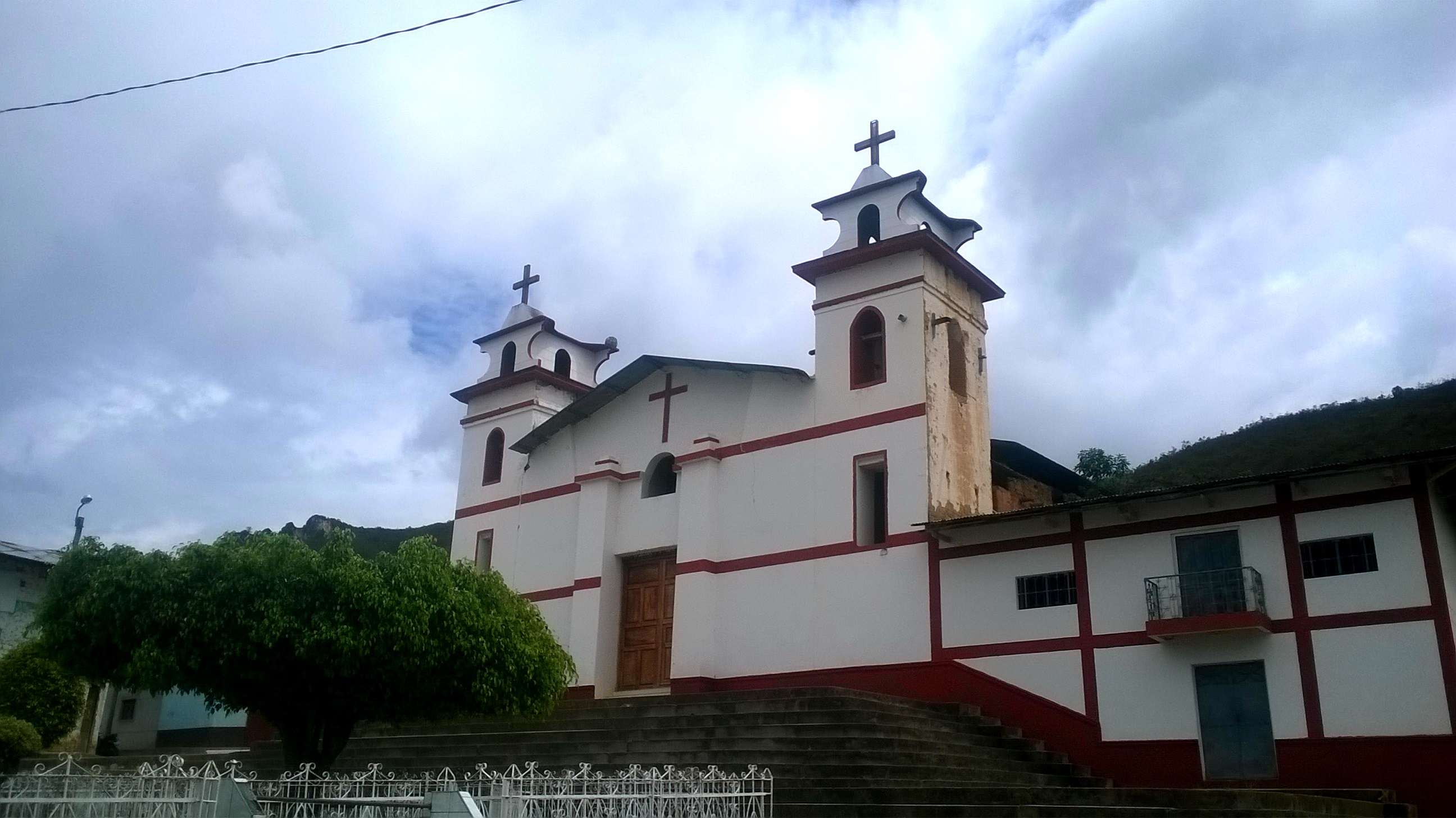
The colonial-era church of Cujillo

Cujillo District is one of fifteen districts of the province Cutervo in Peru.
