= Santo Tomás, Sonora =

Santo Tomás is a populated place in the Caborca Municipality of Sonora, Mexico. It is located roughly 100km from Puerto Peñasco.

== History ==
Santo Tomas was established when it was purchased in 1960 by the Crewse-Reyna family. Roughly 3600 acres of land was sold via land grant given to Francisco Reyna Sotelo, after serving during the Mexican Revolution in the 1900s. In 1960, the land rights were transferred to his daughter, Paulina Reyna Crewse and her husband Bob Crewse.

Bob developed the land as a cattle ranch but died in 1969, and Paulina maintained the cattle thereafter, but by 1971 relinquished those plans and began to develop a tourist destination and the site known today as Las Dunas de Santo Tomas. Very briefly, a restaurant, grocery store and a few rental cabins were available but tourism business went dormant by 1980 and the businesses closed.

In 1996, Paulina and Bob's children decided to revive the tourism industry and built a partnership with a Mexican landholding corporation to establish Las Dunas De Santo Tomas.

== The city ==
The city is a "free zone", meaning visitors from the US are welcome to enter without obtaining a visa. This makes Santo Tomás popular among Arizona, California and Nevada locals.
