= Santo Tomás, Baja California =

Town in Ensenada Municipality, Baja California

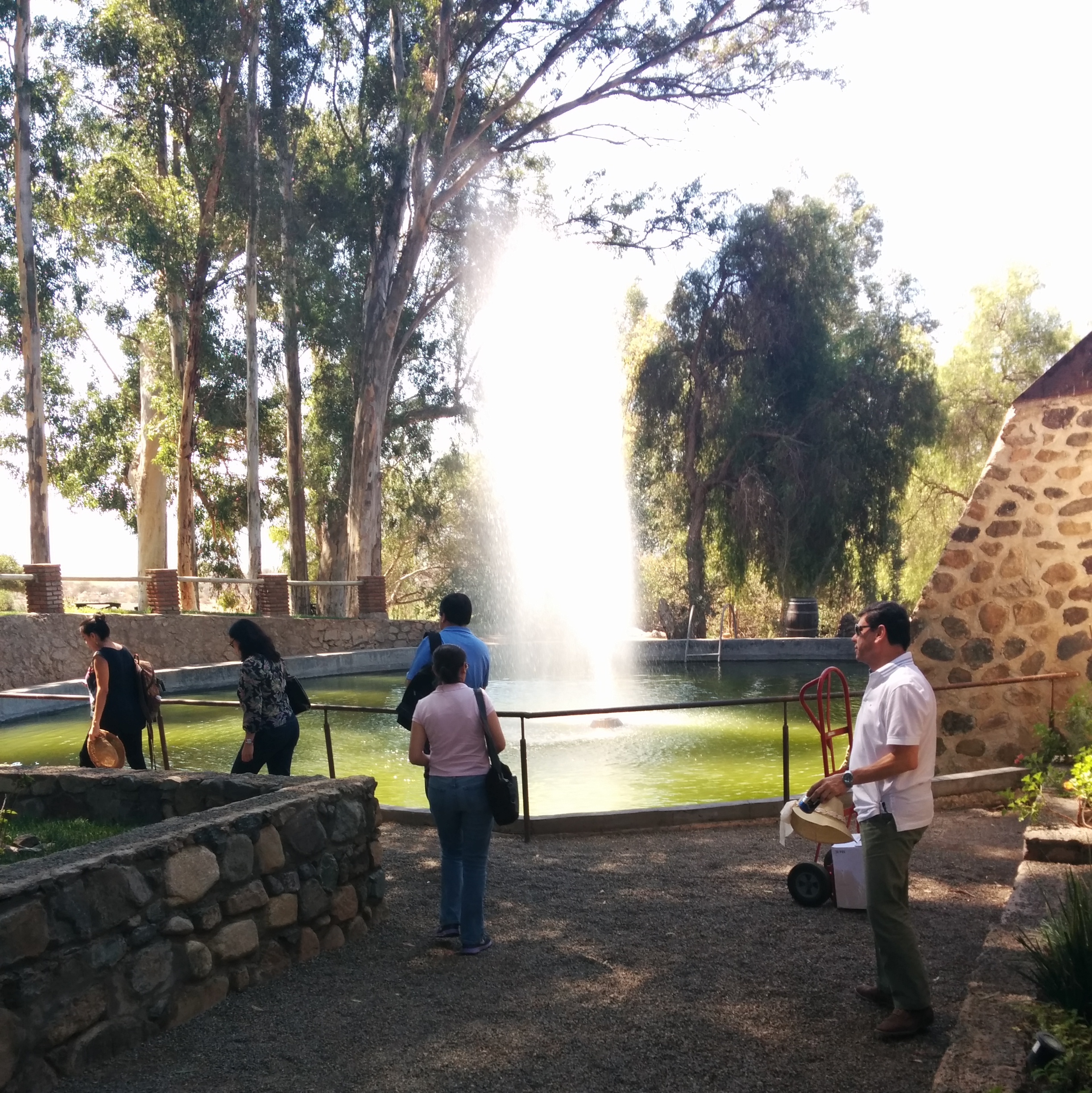
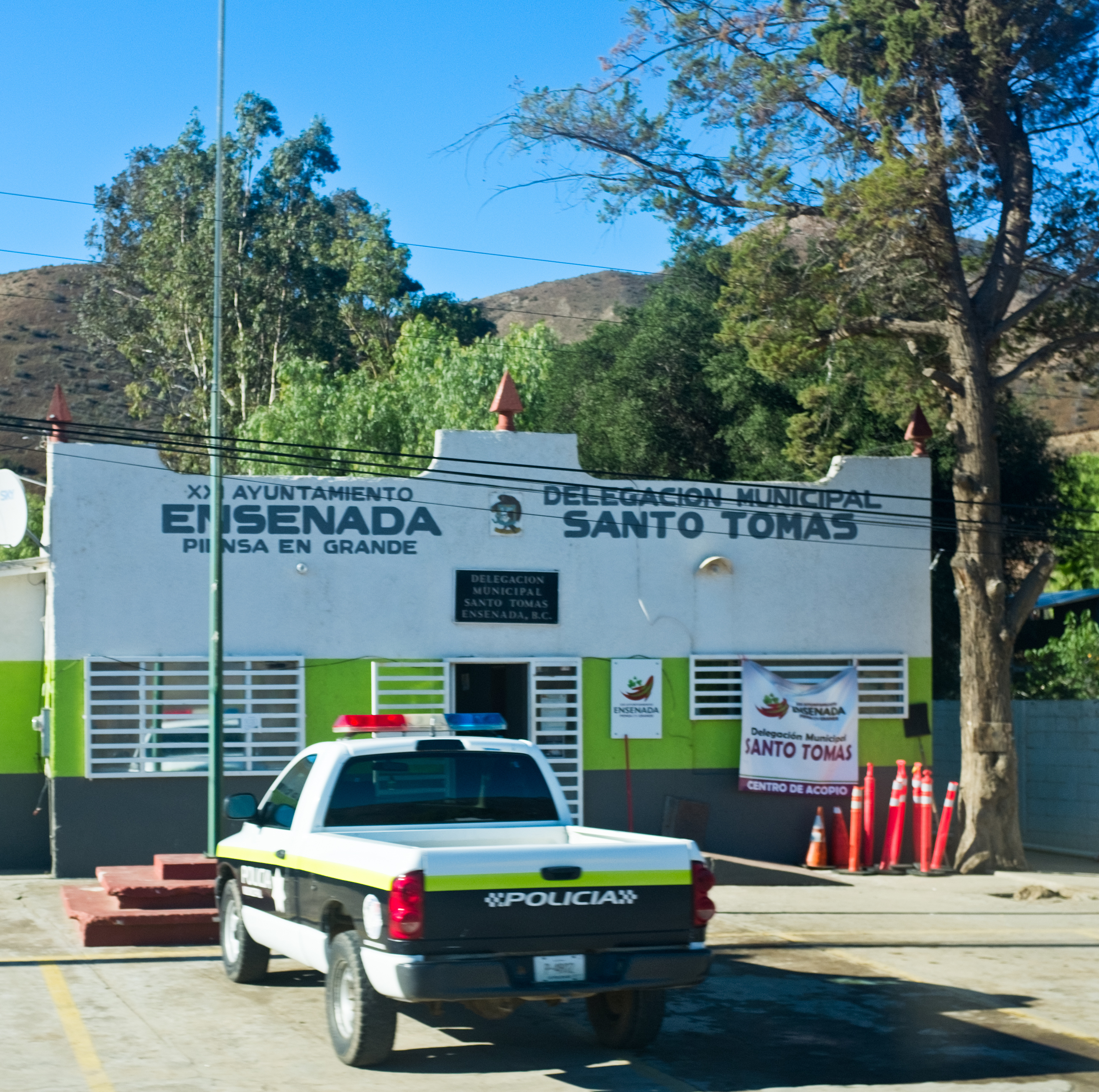

- Location in Mexico
- Coordinates: 30°50′16″N 116°03′26″W
- Country: Mexico
- State: Baja California
- Municipality: Ensenada
- Time zone: UTC-8 (Northwest US Pacific)
  - Summer (DST): UTC-7 (Northwest)

Santo Tomás a town in Ensenada Municipality, Baja California, on the Pacific Coast of Mexico. Santo Tomás is primarily a wine-growing region, though it is increasingly a tourist destination.

== History ==
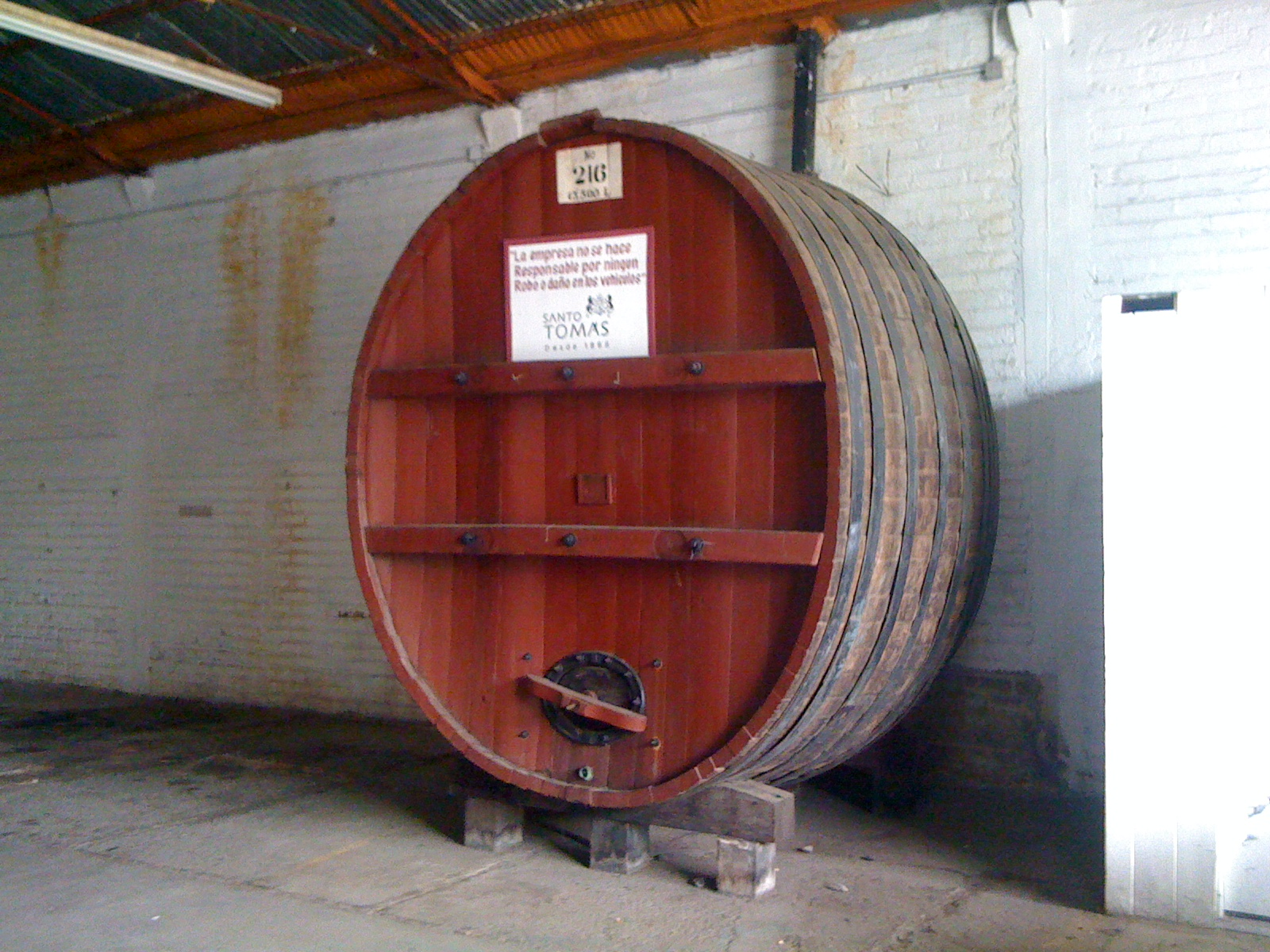
Santo Tomás is one of numerous wine-growing regions in Baja California.

It was originally the site of the Misión Santo Tomás de Aquino. After the mission was abandoned, it was taken as a post for the Mexican frontier garrison and for a time as the capital of the territory of Baja California. The town grew up east of the Mission site.

=== Climate ===
Climate data for Santo Tomas (1991–2020)
Month	Jan	Feb	Mar	Apr	May	Jun	Jul	Aug	Sep	Oct	Nov	Dec	Year
Record high °C (°F)	35 (95)	36 (97)	41 (106)	46 (115)	48 (118)	49 (120)	49 (120)	48 (118)	49 (120)	48 (118)	41 (106)	39 (102)	49 (120)
Mean daily maximum °C (°F)	20.9 (69.6)	21.9 (71.4)	24.0 (75.2)	27.3 (81.1)	30.4 (86.7)	34.2 (93.6)	37.4 (99.3)	36.7 (98.1)	36.8 (98.2)	30.2 (86.4)	24.1 (75.4)	21.0 (69.8)	28.7 (83.7)
Daily mean °C (°F)	12.9 (55.2)	13.8 (56.8)	15.4 (59.7)	17.3 (63.1)	19.7 (67.5)	22.2 (72.0)	24.3 (75.7)	24.4 (75.9)	24.2 (75.6)	19.6 (67.3)	14.9 (58.8)	12.3 (54.1)	18.4 (65.1)
Mean daily minimum °C (°F)	4.9 (40.8)	5.7 (42.3)	6.8 (44.2)	7.2 (45.0)	9.1 (48.4)	10.2 (50.4)	11.3 (52.3)	12.2 (54.0)	11.5 (52.7)	9.0 (48.2)	5.8 (42.4)	3.7 (38.7)	8.1 (46.6)
Record low °C (°F)	−9 (16)	−6 (21)	−3 (27)	−5 (23)	0.8 (33.4)	1 (34)	1 (34)	2 (36)	−1 (30)	0 (32)	−7 (19)	−7 (19)	−9 (16)
Average precipitation mm (inches)	63.9 (2.52)	72.2 (2.84)	49.4 (1.94)	13.2 (0.52)	3.5 (0.14)	0.5 (0.02)	0.6 (0.02)	0.9 (0.04)	1.4 (0.06)	10.1 (0.40)	17.5 (0.69)	35.7 (1.41)	268.9 (10.59)
Average precipitation days (≥ 0.1 mm)	4.4	5.4	4.5	2.3	0.8	0.1	0.2	0.2	0.3	1.7	2.4	3.5	25.8
Source: Servicio Meteorologico Nacional

== Economy ==
Santo Tomás is a wine-growing region, home to numerous vineyards and wineries. Since the rise in popularity of Valle de Guadalupe as a premier wine region in Baja California, Santo Tomás has begun to develop tourist accommodations, such as hotels and fine dining.

== See also ==
- Spanish missions in California
