= San Andrés de Cutervo District =

Coordinates: 6°14′11″S 78°42′40″W

San Andrés de Cutervo
- District
- Interactive map of San Andrés de Cutervo
- Country: Peru
- Region: Cajamarca
- Province: Cutervo
- Founded: October 6, 1961
- Capital: San Andrés de Cutervo

Government
  - Mayor: Alejandro Perez Cardozo

Area
  - Total: 133.4 km^{2} (51.5 sq mi)
- Elevation: 2,050 m (6,730 ft)

Population (2005 census)
  - Total: 5,904
  - Density: 44.26/km^{2} (114.6/sq mi)
- Time zone: UTC-5 (PET)
- UBIGEO: 060608

San Andrés de Cutervo District is one of fifteen districts of the province Cutervo in Peru.
