= Prunus integrifolia =

Conservation status
- Least Concern (IUCN 3.1)

Scientific classification
- Kingdom: Plantae
- Clade: Embryophytes
- Clade: Tracheophytes
- Clade: Angiosperms
- Clade: Eudicots
- Clade: Rosids
- Order: Rosales
- Family: Rosaceae
- Genus: Prunus
- Species: P. integrifolia

Binomial name
- Prunus integrifolia (C.Presl) Walp.

Synonyms
- Cerasus integrifolia C. Presl; Prunus recurviflora Koehne; Prunus villegasiana Pilg.

Species of tree

Prunus integrifolia is a tree native to mountain forests of western South America. It has much larger leaves than most other species in the genus, up to 25 centimetres (10 inches) long, with no teeth along the edges. The flowers are in an elongated raceme, rising vertically upwards rather than hanging as in some other species.
