= Santo Domingo de la Capilla District =

Coordinates: 6.2441°S 78.8551°W

Santo Domingo de la Capilla
- District
- Interactive map of Santo Domingo de la Capilla
- Country: Peru
- Region: Cajamarca
- Province: Cutervo
- Founded: January 12, 1956
- Capital: Santo Domingo de la Capilla

Government
  - Mayor: Evaristo Reinerio Flores Fernandez

Area
  - Total: 103.74 km^{2} (40.05 sq mi)
- Elevation: 1,900 m (6,200 ft)

Population (2005 census)
  - Total: 5,718
  - Density: 55.12/km^{2} (142.8/sq mi)
- Time zone: UTC-5 (PET)
- UBIGEO: 060612

Santo Domingo de la Capilla District is one of fifteen districts of the province Cutervo in Peru.

The district of Santo Domingo de la Capilla was created by an Act of January 12, 1956, in the government of President Manuel A. Odria. In ecclesiastical terms, it is part of the sub-diocese of Chota, suffragan of the Archdiocese of Piura.
