= Cutervo District =

Coordinates: 6.3652°S 78.8174°W

Cutervo
- District
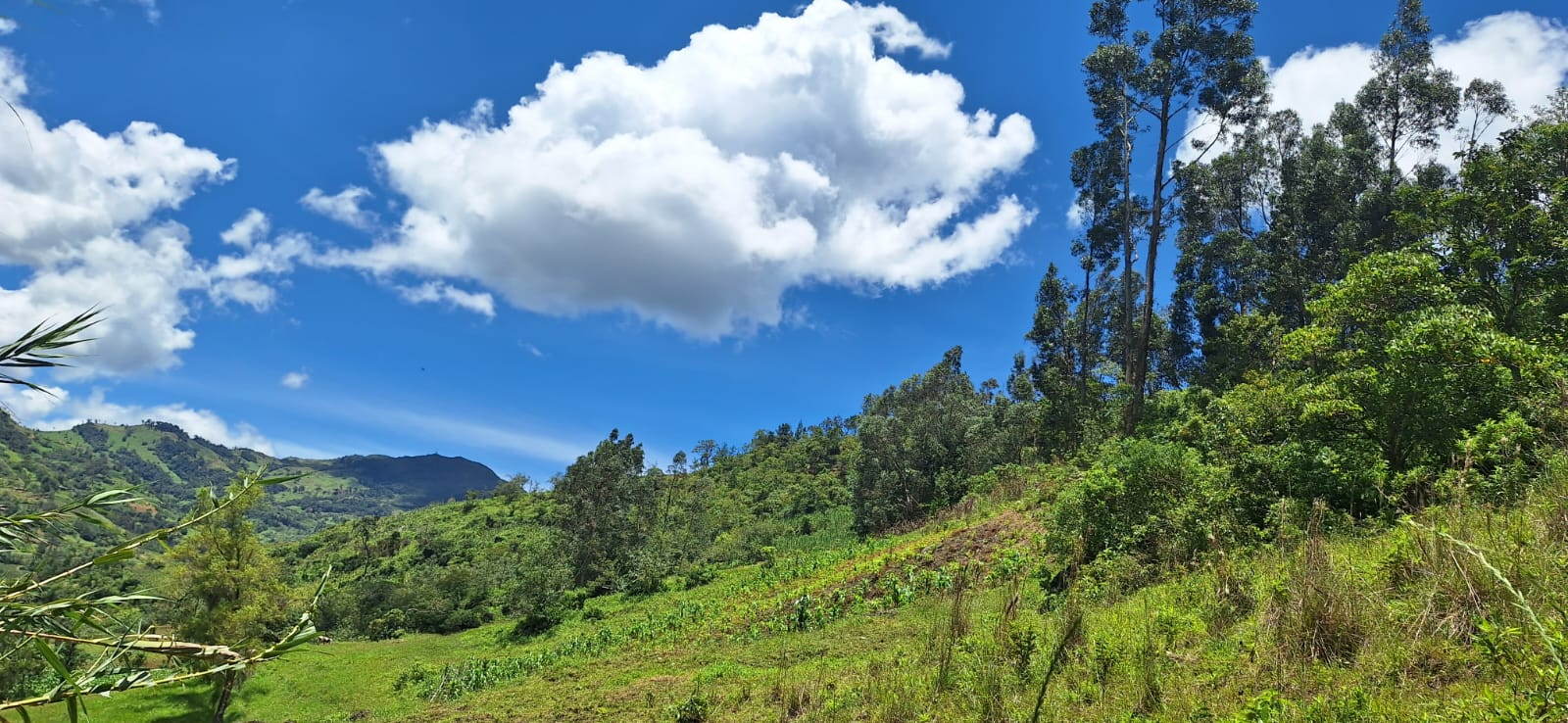
- Interactive map of Cutervo
- Country: Peru
- Region: Cajamarca
- Province: Cutervo
- Capital: Cutervo

Government
  - Mayor: Wilson Ademar Delgado Olivera

Area
  - Total: 422.27 km^{2} (163.04 sq mi)
- Elevation: 2,649 m (8,691 ft)

Population (2005 census)
  - Total: 53,382
  - Density: 126.42/km^{2} (327.42/sq mi)
- Time zone: UTC-5 (PET)
- UBIGEO: 060601
- Climate: Cfb

Cutervo District is one of fifteen districts of the province Cutervo in Peru.
