= Sant Tomàs =

- Municipality
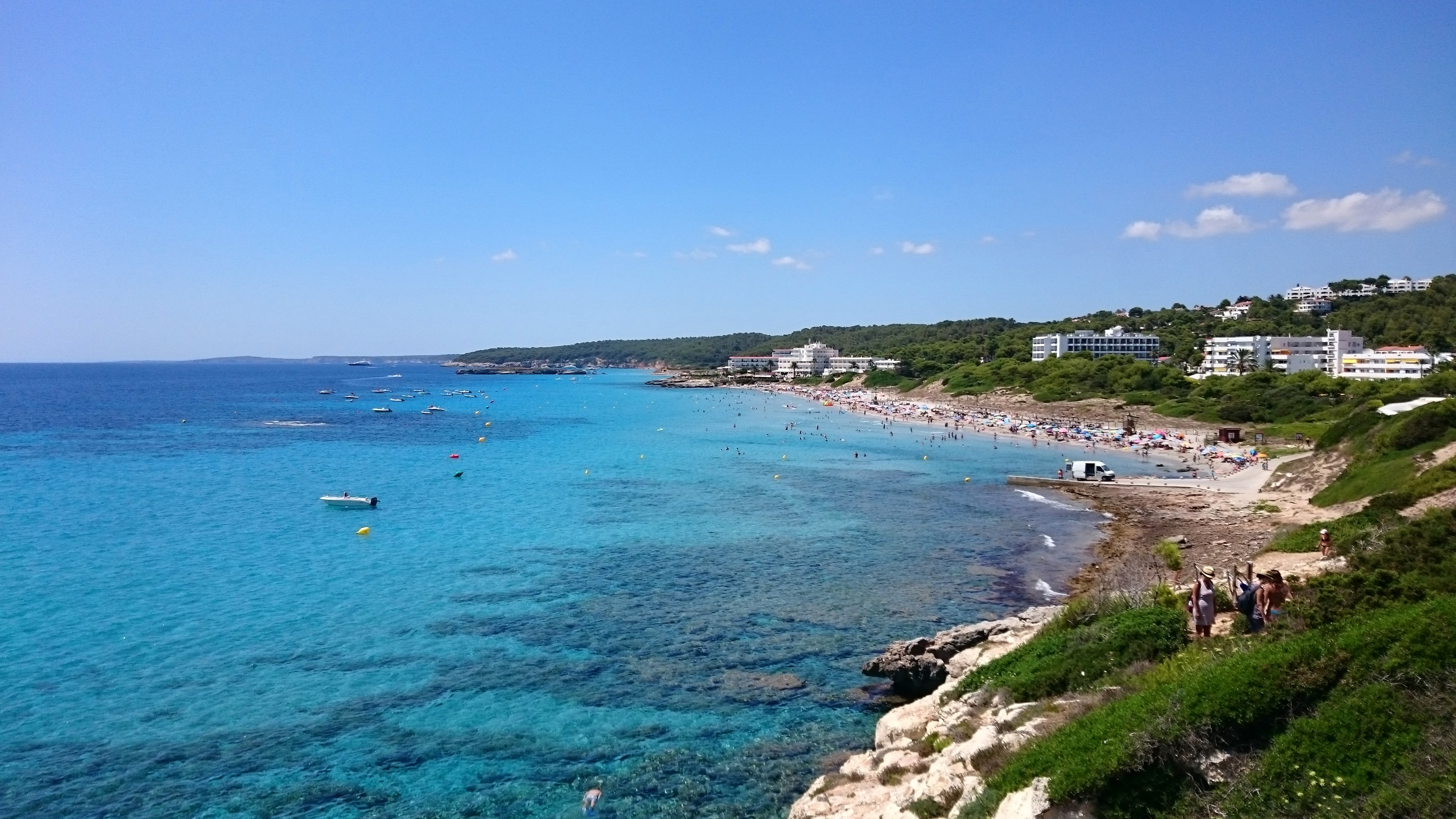
- Interactive map of Sant Tomàs
- Coordinates: 39.9170°N 4.0390°E

Population
  - Total: 60

Sant Tomàs of Es Migjorn Gran, or Santo Tomás in Spanish, is a small village on the south coast of Menorca, part of the Spanish Balearic islands located in the Mediterranean Sea. Surrounded by hills and woodlands, Sant Tomàs is in the municipality of Es Migjorn Gran. It is between the resorts of Son Bou and Cala Galdana.

It is a popular family destination, as many bars close at 11 pm, resulting in a quiet nightlife. The majority of the village is dedicated to tourism.

The main attraction of Sant Tomàs is the beach, which plays host to many water sport activities.
