= Callayuc District =

Callayuc
- District
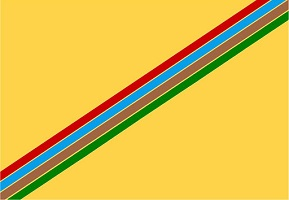
- Flag

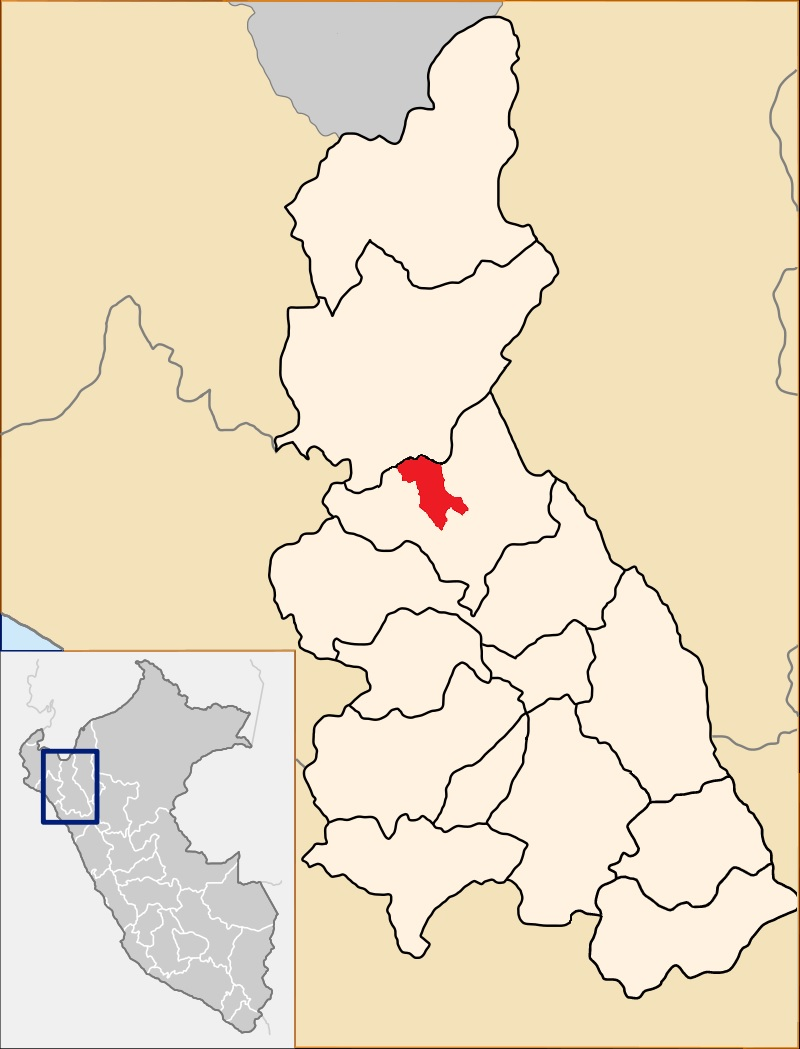
- Location of Callayuc in the Cutervo Province
- Coordinates: 6°09′S 78°55′W
- Country: Peru
- Region: Cajamarca
- Province: Cutervo
- Capital: Callayuc

Government
  - Mayor: Juan Sánchez Mena

Area
  - Total: 316.05 km^{2} (122.03 sq mi)
- Elevation: 1,500 m (4,900 ft)

Population (Peru 2018 Census)
  - Total: 10,237
  - Density: 32.390/km^{2} (83.891/sq mi)
- Time zone: UTC-5 (PET)
- UBIGEO: 060602
- Climate: Aw

Callayuc District is one of fifteen districts of the province Cutervo in Peru.

It is a Peruvian district. It has an area of 316.05 km^{2}, which represents 10.4% of the territory of the Cutervo province. It limits to the north with the district of Colasay (Jaén), to the east with the district of Santa Cruz (Cutervo), to the southeast with the district of San Andrés de Cutervo (Cutervo), to the south with Santo Domingo de la Capilla and to the southwest with Querocotillo district.

Located in the north of Peru, between the natural regions of Ceja de Selva and Sierra, it had a population of 10,321 inhabitants in 2015 according to the INEI. The geographical conditions favor the existence of a vast flora and fauna. Due to geographical, logistical and historical conditions, it maintains a fluid link with the province of Jaén; mainly commercial, from whom it is 51 km. It is a hinge territory, since it allows the passage of the PE-5N longitudinal highway in its northern latitude, and to its effect a land route of regional importance extends to the northeast, Puerto Chiple is part of its territory and is the main entrance access to this district and also to the province of Cutervo and other Cajamarcan towns.

In terms of ecclesiastical order, said territory is part of the Prelature of Chota, a suffragan of the Archdiocese of Piura.

== History ==
From the historical point of view, it has been a town with signs of colonial existence, and presumably pre-Hispanic, but the documented records do not date if not three decades before the independence of Peru. This district was part of the intendancy of Quito until 1784 (first official record as an existing town), since said territories belonging to Jaén, were within the jurisdiction of the Viceroyalty of New Granada. According to the first records, Callayuc appears as an annex, and then also as a curate towards the years of 1780. Later, in the process of Peruvian independence, Callayuc is already registered as a district, such records are found in Colombian, Peruvian and Ecuadorian archives. Although the exact date around its district category is unclear, February 12, 1821, is recognized as the anniversary date of the district, although it was only recognized as such by decree at the beginning of 1824, under the dictatorial administration of Bolívar.

Such inaccuracies have been the result of previous claims and historical claims that made said jurisdiction unstable, after these events; Said town has shown historically and by the evidence of the facts to be a patriotic town and of men who proclaim themselves free, since the first demonstration takes place on June 4, 1821, after the flight of the former governor of Jaén, a new governor is appointed. from the province to don Juan Antonio Checa, who after an open town hall call, a delegation of callayujanos along with other contemporary towns swear by the independence of the new republic.

Then, imminent territorial claims of Gran Colombia (later the new Ecuadorian state), on September 18, 1830, the "Act of Callayuc" was drawn up, where said citizens and their mayor, Mr. José Antonio Alejandría, stated that they recognized the laws, decrees, and regulations Peruvians, and therefore reject any foreign claims of submission and laws that are not those of Peru. Callayuc was evidently the limit of claim to the southernmost territory of Greater Colombia and later Ecuador, since the historical data and cartographic plans mention Callayujano territories of the time such as Santo Domingo del Colpar or Cordillera Tarros as border zones, between the original territory of the Viceroyalty of Peru and New Granada.

== insurrection against the Leguía regime ==
During the second decade of the 20th century; in 1924 a popular insurrection broke out against the then government of Augusto B Legía, Callayuc was an important scene at the height and end of that guerrilla movement led by the civilian and hacienda man Eleodoro Benel Zulueta, while the armed movement gave At the beginning, Benel establishes bonds of friendship and familiarity with some Callayujanos. The confrontation with the national government became more violent and fierce combats took place in the surrounding areas of Callayuc and its annexes, whose actions kept the population in suspense, but while the persecution against the leader increased, he became more defiant, giving place to forced recruitment of men from the area, such coercion was of degree or force, the refusal was seen as treason and therefore executed, causing many human losses, that time is known as "Bandolerismo".

Finally, Benel manages to equip himself in the mountainous areas of the Cordillera Tarros to the southeast, wooded and remote territories of the district, whose relatively large area was conducive to such tasks. By the year 1926, he settled in the Callayujano hamlet of Silugan. That same year, the pressure and coercion of the population gave the guerrilla military enlargement; the actions were increasingly brutal, increasing the loss of life, looting and oppression under threat. In 1927, countrymen and landowners of the jurisdiction and surrounding areas began to unanimously reject these actions that at the time provided some support, after these scenarios the bandits set fire to the town of Callayuc, in retaliation. It is in the middle of that year that Santiago Altamirano Molocho, a Callayujano close to the influences of the Leguía regime, and at the same time the guerrilla's compadre, is appointed under the order of the government for the capture of Benel Zulueta.

After days of terror in the population for being the battlefield of the last bastions of resistance, men from Altamirano supported by government forces, achieved the fall of the guerrilla in the Arenal sector of the Callayuc district, putting an end to the uprising against the government

== Geography ==
It is a moderately rugged territory, with altitudinal floors ranging from 2,817 m.a.s.l. in the northwest of its territory (Wuissuso Huichus hill) its highest point; up to 690 m.s.n.m (Puerto Chiple) the lowest zone, making its territory a varied region, the typical tropical vegetation of the jungle is abundant and there are areas of fertile valleys in the central part of its territory, in the courses of the Santa Clara, Callayuc rivers, and in the northwest a small beach jurisdiction between the mouth of the Chotano and Chamaya rivers

In the northwest, plains of abundant vegetation contrast towards the sectors of Queromarca and Sector el Campo with areas of beaches that do not exceed 1000 meters above sea level in the sectors of Playa Azul, Matara and Puerto Chiple. with moderate seasonal rainfall.

Towards the southeast it presents a climate with low rainfall where the subtropical yunga region predominates.

In the northwest, plains of abundant vegetation contrast towards the sectors of Queromarca and Sector el Campo with areas of beaches that do not exceed 1000 meters above sea level in the sectors of Playa Azul, Matara and Puerto Chiple, with moderate seasonal rainfall.

The Quechua region is not notorious, it only occurs in places that exceed 2,500 meters above sea level, it mostly occurs on the western side, this is the case of areas adjacent to the peaks of Wuissus, Marlumba, and Paratón, and to the southeast the peripheries from Cerro Cinchango or Chamusco.

== Climate ==
Callayuc has a pleasant climate, in general terms of its territorial district two very marked climates predominate; the warm-dry tropical climate characteristic of the jungle border and the semi-humid temperate climate in peripheral areas (some hamlets).

The town of Callayuc has a tropical climate, in winter there is less rain than in summer. According to the Köppen-Geiger classification system, the climate is considered AW (tropical climate with dry winter). It is worth mentioning that temperatures vary due to its extension and extension of its territory.

Average annual temperature: 19.4 °C. Precipitation: 723 mm average per year Driest month: July, 20 mm. A 124mm. month of greatest precipitation/year: March, 124 mm. hottest month: January 23 °C average. coldest month: July 18.3 °C average
