= Choros District =

Coordinates: 5.7876°S 78.7132°W

Choros
- District
- Interactive map of Choros
- Country: Peru
- Region: Cajamarca
- Province: Cutervo
- Founded: January 02, 1857
- Capital: Choros

Government
  - Mayor: Salvador Diaz Vasquez

Area
  - Total: 276.96 km^{2} (106.93 sq mi)
- Elevation: 479 m (1,572 ft)

Population (2005 census)
  - Total: 3,966
  - Density: 14.32/km^{2} (37.09/sq mi)
- Time zone: UTC-5 (PET)
- UBIGEO: 060603

Choros District is one of fifteen districts of the province Cutervo in Peru.
