= Cutervo =

- Town
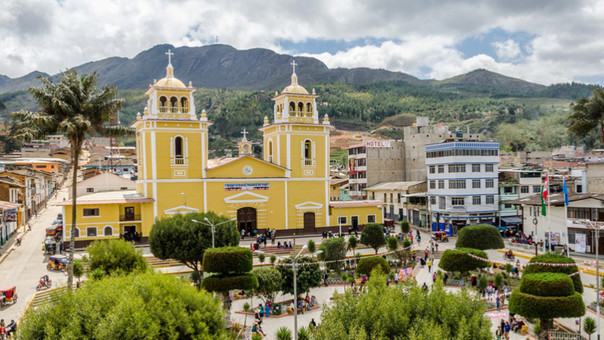

- Location within Peru
- Coordinates: 6°22′40″S 78°49′00″W
- Country: Peru
- Region: Cajamarca
- Province: Cutervo
- District: Cutervo

Population (2020)
  - Total: 51,272
- Time zone: UTC-5 (PET)

Cutervo is a town in northern Peru, capital of both Cutervo District and Cutervo Province in the Cajamarca Region. As of 2020, Cutervo had a population of 51,272.

== History ==
Based on the remains of pictographs, ceramics, and metal tools, it is concluded that this region, now known as Cutervo, has been populated since ancient times. During the pre-Inca period, the territory was part of the Wari culture, and later, during the Inca period, it was part of the Huampos or Guambos. The expansion of the Inca Empire subdued the peoples of this region around 1460, a task attributed to the Inca Tupac Yupanqui. Later, the Guambos kingdom was converted into a Wamani, or province, of the Chinchaysuyo empire.

With the arrival of the Spanish, this territory was incorporated as part of the Trujillo government. In 1540, the lands were distributed through encomiendas, with the province of Guambos, to which Cutervo belonged, corresponding to the Spanish Lorenzo de Ulloa.

On November 12, 1823, the first Political Constitution of Peru was promulgated. The first Constituent Congress established that the territory of the republic would be divided into departments, these into provinces, and the provinces into districts.In 1834, a commission of notables called the "Departmental Board of Cajamarca" was formed in the city of Cajamarca to work toward the creation of the department by separating it from La Libertad.

Once Independence was proclaimed and the Republic was established, Cutervo was elevated by Decree of Simón Bolívar dated January 28, 1825, to the category of District of the province of Chota, which was part of the department of La Libertad, until the year 1855 when the Department of Cajamarca was created.

== Geography ==
=== Location ===
The city is located in the central part of the Cajamarca Region, in the central mountain range of the northern Peruvian Andes, approximately 100 kilometers north of the departmental capital. It lies on the left bank of the Cutervo River, which flows into the Sócota River and through the Llaucán River into the Marañón River. The district's surface area is estimated at 422.27 square kilometers.

=== Climate ===
Chivay has a subtropical highland climate (Köppen: Cfb) characterized by consistent mild temperatures.

Cutervo experiences relatively stable temperatures throughout the year, with slight fluctuations between months. The yearly average high temperature is 17.7°C (63.9°F), while the yearly average low temperature is 9.8°C (49.6°F).

The total annual precipitation is around 1,000 millimetres (39 in). Cutervo has a dry season, from June to August, which sees significantly reduced precipitation.

Climate data for Cutervo (1991–2020)
Month	Jan	Feb	Mar	Apr	May	Jun	Jul	Aug	Sep	Oct	Nov	Dec	Year
Mean daily maximum °C (°F)	17.4 (63.3)	17.3 (63.1)	17.4 (63.3)	17.9 (64.2)	17.8 (64.0)	17.0 (62.6)	16.6 (61.9)	17.4 (63.3)	18.2 (64.8)	18.5 (65.3)	18.9 (66.0)	17.9 (64.2)	17.7 (63.9)
Mean daily minimum °C (°F)	9.6 (49.3)	10.0 (50.0)	10.4 (50.7)	10.5 (50.9)	10.2 (50.4)	9.6 (49.3)	9.0 (48.2)	9.1 (48.4)	9.7 (49.5)	9.8 (49.6)	9.4 (48.9)	9.8 (49.6)	9.8 (49.6)
Average precipitation mm (inches)	102.5 (4.04)	129.6 (5.10)	157.9 (6.22)	107.9 (4.25)	69.0 (2.72)	27.0 (1.06)	20.6 (0.81)	16.8 (0.66)	51.1 (2.01)	117.0 (4.61)	98.8 (3.89)	121.2 (4.77)	1,019.4 (40.13)
Source: NOAA
