= Misión Santo Tomás de Aquino =

18th-century Spanish mission in Baja California, Mexico

- Location in Baja California Location in Mexico
- Location: Santo Tomás, Baja California, Mexico
- Coordinates: 31°33′30″N 116°24′49″W
- Patron: Thomas Aquinas
- Founded: 24 April 1791
- Founded by: José Loriente
- Founding Order: Dominicans
- Native tribe(s) Spanish name(s): Kumeyaay
- Neophyte population: 400 (1824)
- Secularized: 1833

Mission Santo Tomás de Aquino (Spanish: Misión Santo Tomás de Aquino) was founded in what is now Baja California on April 24, 1791 by the Dominican missionary José Loriente, with the authorization of the president of the missions, Juan Crisóstomo Gómez. It was named for Saint Thomas Aquinas.

The mission was established in the territory of the Kumeyaay, on the mountainside of the San Solano hills in northwestern Baja California, Mexico. It bridged the 120-kilometer gap between the previously founded missions of San Vicente and San Miguel.

The mission was relocated twice, in around 1794 and in 1799. Historians are uncertain concerning the locations of the first two mission sites. The third and final location was at the modern town of Santo Tomás.

The population was over 250 individuals in 1800, and it reached its peak of 400 in 1824. The mission was secularized in 1833, but a priest continued to serve the neophytes until 1849. In that year, the native population had fallen to 40, and the mission was abandoned to the military, who used it as a fort and capital for southern California. Deteriorating ruins survive at the site.

== Location and natural habitat ==
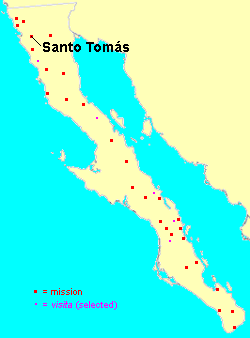
Location of Misión Santo Tomás de Aquino in Baja California

The mission was built in a large valley crossed by two or three little springs in the town that today bears the name of the former mission.

Among the flora that the missionaries found were mezcal, chamizo, alder, willow, oak, poplar, and elderberry.

Agricultural crops included wheat, olives, grapes, maize, barley, beans, and other vegetables, all of which were cultivated using irrigation. It is estimated that the mission had around 80-178 hectares of farm land.

Second site of the mission in 1926.

== Mission Compound ==
A full reconstruction of the final mission site is nearly impossible, because the foundations have been destroyed by constant plowing through the years. However, it is possible to form a mental picture of the evolving mission infrastructure with the aid of reports from contemporary priests.

Presumably at the second mission site, Miguel López reported in 1795 that some 70 varas (60 m) had been laid down as foundation for the construction of the mission. One year later López and José Loriente reported the construction of a residence with a grand hall, three rooms, common spaces, a dispensary, and separate residences for single men and women. In 1797 another report refers to the existence of a small corral for smaller livestock.

== Commerce ==
The mission's proximity to the coast allowed it to take part in maritime commerce that exploited the nearby Bocana de Santo Tomás and Bahía de Todos Santos at Ensenada. Accounts such as those by William Shaler and John Locke, going as far back as 1795, mention trading with the Santo Tomás missionaries.

Sea otter fur was a popular trade item on the shores under the jurisdiction of Santo Tomás. In 1809, the Boston vessel Dromio acquired 1,700 furs in the course of a 34-day period in the bay of Ensenada. It is worth mentioning that most of the commerce near San Tomás was illegal because of the Spanish Crown's restrictions against trading with vessels under foreign flags.

Beginning in the late 1790s, grapes were grown for winemaking. Santo Tomás is home today to several Baja winemakers and is one of the three principal grape growing and wine making regions in Baja California.

== List of resident padres ==
Missionaries who directed Mission Santo Tomás during its formative years included:

- 1791 – 1797 Josef Loriente
- 1798 – 1803 Miguel López
- 1803 – 1803 Eudaldo Surroca

== See also ==
- Spanish missions in Baja California
