= Santo Tomás District, Cutervo =

Coordinates: 6.3793°S 78.8171°W

Santo Tomás District
- District
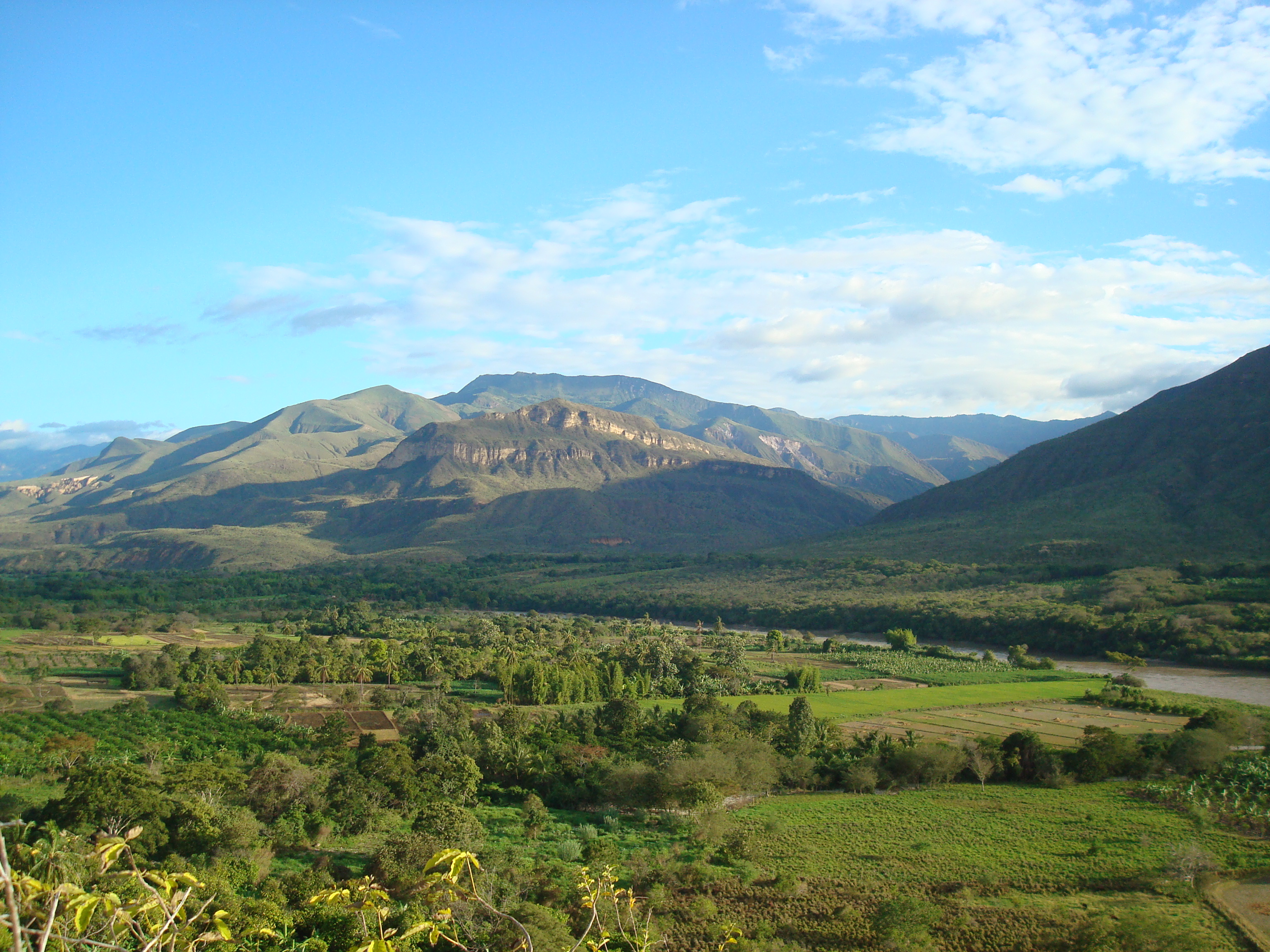
- Santo Tomás District (in the background) and Marañón River as seen from near Tactago (Cumba District, Utcubamba Province)
- Interactive map of Santo Tomás District
- Country: Peru
- Region: Cajamarca
- Province: Cutervo
- Founded: August 17, 1920
- Capital: Santo Tomás

Government
  - Mayor: Walter Aurelio Guerrero Gonzalez

Area
  - Total: 279.61 km^{2} (107.96 sq mi)
- Elevation: 2,000 m (6,600 ft)

Population (2005 census)
  - Total: 9,182
  - Density: 32.84/km^{2} (85.05/sq mi)
- Time zone: UTC-5 (PET)
- UBIGEO: 060613

Santo Tomás District is one of fifteen districts of the province Cutervo in Peru.
