= Saint Thomas Midtown Hospital =

Ascension Saint Thomas Hospital Midtown
- Ascension Saint Thomas

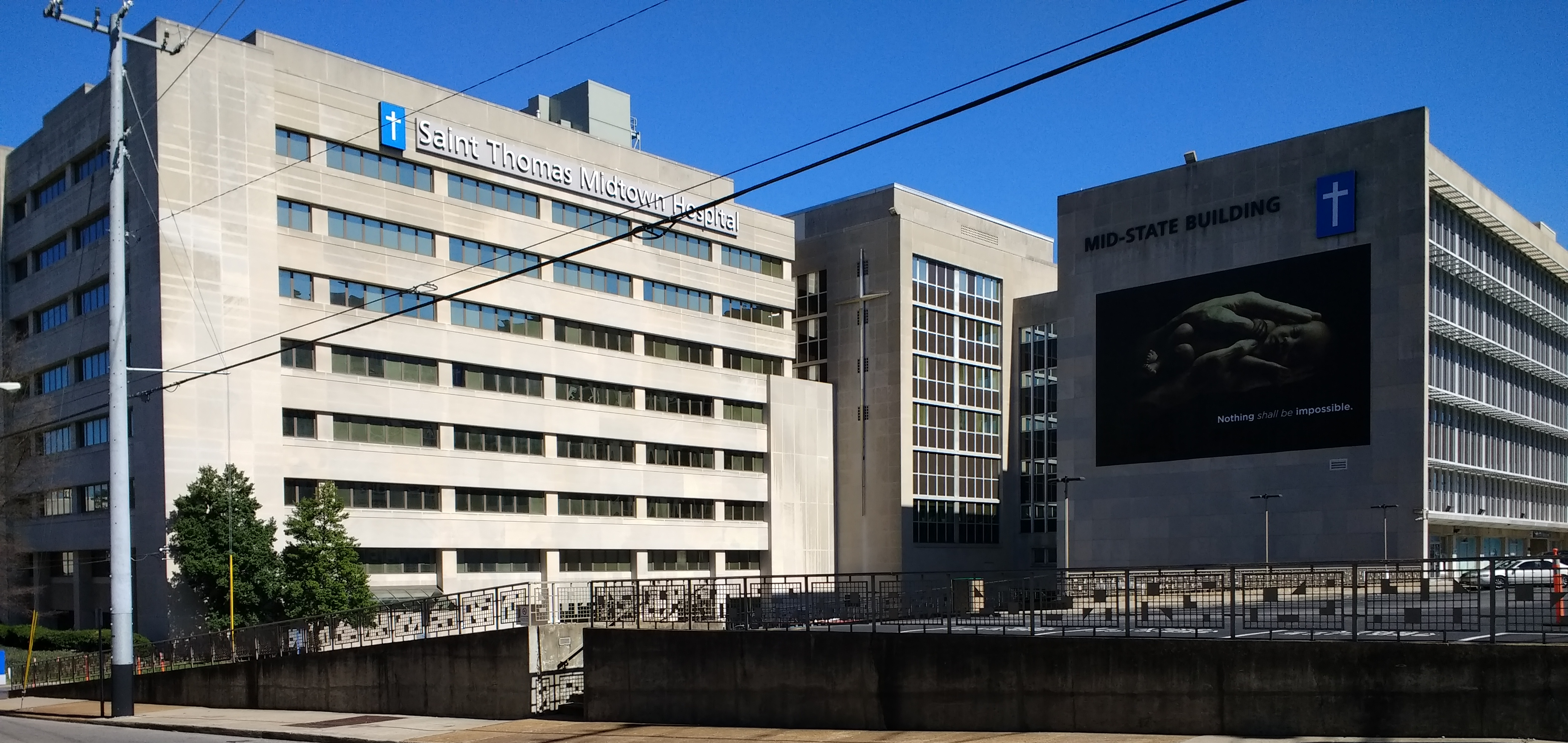

Geography
- Location: Nashville, Tennessee, United States
- Coordinates: 36°9′14″N 86°48′9″W

Organization
- Care system: Private
- Type: Community
- Network: Ascension Health

Services
- Standards: Joint Commission
- Beds: 683

History
- Founded: 1918

Links
- Lists: Hospitals in the United States

Ascension Saint Thomas Hospital Midtown, formerly known as Baptist Hospital, is a non-profit community hospital in Nashville, Tennessee, United States and the largest such hospital in Middle Tennessee. It is licensed for 683 acute and rehab care beds.

Ascension Saint Thomas Hospital Midtown is one of the Ascension Saint Thomas family of hospitals.

== History ==
A Heritage of Healing for 90 Years

In 1918, an influenza epidemic ravaged Nashville and during this crisis Baptist Hospital was established. Originally known as Protestant Hospital, it was incorporated on December 12, 1918, by L. A Bowers, Leslie Creek, E. B. Craig, R. M. Dudley and John A. Pitts.

The 10-and-a-half-acre plot, bought from the Murphy estate, consisted of two adjoining city blocks bounded by four city streets: Patterson Street on the north, Church Street on the south, 20th Avenue on the east, and 21st Avenue on the west. There were two buildings—one became the hospital, and one became the dormitory for the School of Nursing.

On March 20, 1919, the Protestant Hospital opened. It was equipped with 80 beds and a surgical department. In the first year alone, 2,233 patients were treated; 1,685 of them had major surgery. Gladys Kilby was the first patient admitted and gave birth to a baby girl, Anita Kilby Lewis.

Debt grew quickly during the Great Depression and during World War II. As a result of the ongoing financial difficulties, the ownership of Protestant Hospital was transferred to the Tennessee Baptist Convention in 1948 and became Mid-State Baptist Hospital. The name would later change to Baptist Hospital on December 17, 1964. By 1973, Baptist Hospital, with its 600 beds, had become the largest hospital in Midsouth. It purchased five buildings from Saint Thomas Hospital’s vacated Church Street property in 1975. In 1986, Baptist Hospital and Saint Thomas Hospital partnered to purchase Middle Tennessee Medical Center in Murfreesboro, Tennessee.

In January 2002, Baptist Hospital joined Saint Thomas Health's regional health system and became a member of Ascension Health, a Catholic organization that is the largest non-profit health system in the United States. In 2013, its name was changed from Baptist Hospital to Ascension Saint Thomas Hospital Midtown.

== Spiritual Care Initiative ==
A faith-based hospital, Ascension Saint Thomas Hospital Midtown encourages spiritual healing in addition to physical health. Hospital leaders developed "Creating a Healing Environment: Spiritual Care Initiative" in order to better integrate spirituality into the workplace. The concept takes a department-by-department approach to spiritual care.

Ascension Saint Thomas Hospital Midtown chaplains meet with a department manager to discuss the spiritual care initiative and select a committee of multidisciplinary staff members. Relying on input from colleagues, the team members develop ways spiritual care can enhance their department.

The hospital's neonatal intensive care unit has added a staff prayer to be said at shift change, a box where people can submit prayer requests, a prayer board in the break room, and an "inspiration station," a basket full of hand-outs on spiritual care, as well as greeting cards that associates can give to one another and others.

== Ascension Saint Thomas Heart ==
A collaborative effort among its family of hospitals and other clinics and health care facilities throughout Middle Tennessee and Southern Kentucky, Saint Thomas Heart provides complete cardiac services from more than 20 locations.

In 2008, Saint Thomas Heart achieved a top ranking in Tennessee for Coronary Interventional Procedures according to HealthGrades. It received high ratings for various aspects of cardiac care, including heart failure treatment, atrial fibrillation care, coronary interventions, and coronary services. The institution also gained national recognition, ranking among the top performers for coronary interventions and cardiology services.

Also in 2008, Thomson/Reuters named Saint Thomas Heart to its list of top 100 cardiovascular community hospitals.

In 2010, the cardiologists and heart surgeons at St. Thomas West Hospital and Saint Thomas Midtown Hospital joined under the parent company Saint Thomas Heart. Both groups of physicians still practice separately at each hospital.

== Chest Pain Network ==
The Saint Thomas Chest Pain Network is a division of Ascension Saint Thomas that coordinates with local emergency medical services (EMS) and hospitals to provide cardiac care services. The Chest Pain Network includes 15 hospitals in Tennessee and Kentucky, all accredited by the Society of Chest Pain Centers.

== Neurosciences Institute ==
The Saint Thomas Health Neurosciences Institute is one of the most comprehensive centers in the Nashville area for brain, back, nervous system, and spine care. In 2008, the independent healthcare rating company HealthGrades awarded Saint Thomas a five-star rating for back and neck surgery.

Among the ailments and diseases treated through the Neurosciences Institute are stroke, brain tumors, ALS, sleep disorders, spine injuries, multiple sclerosis, chronic pain, and Parkinson's disease.

The Saint Thomas Brain & Spine Tumor Center is a collaboration between the Neurosciences Institute and the Dan Rudy Cancer Center. Saint Thomas utilizes the Novalis Shaped Beam Surgery System, an advanced stereostatic radiotherapy treatment that precisely targets radiation to the shape of the tumor, minimizing damage to surrounding tissue. The Saint Thomas Health Services Neurosciences Institute is the exclusive healthcare center in Tennessee offering Novalis Shaped Beam Surgery.

== Metabolic Surgery Center ==
The Metabolic Surgery Center at Saint Thomas Midtown Hospital provides a variety of weight loss procedures to assist in the treatment of morbid obesity, diabetes, high blood pressure, sleep apnea, arthritis, asthma, acid reflux, infertility and high cholesterol.

These bariatric procedures include the Laparoscopic Adjustable Gastric Band (LAP-BAND) System, Laparoscopic Roux-en-Y Gastric Bypass, Open or Laparoscopic Duodenal Switch and Laparoscopic Sleeve Gastrectomy.

== Orthopedic Services ==
Saint Thomas Midtown is home to the Joint Replacement Center, which was rated among the top 10 in Tennessee by HealthGrades for Joint Replacement.

In addition to joint replacement, other orthopedic services include sports medicine (including sports physicals), rehabilitation, spine care and surgery, foot and ankle care, and hand, wrist and shoulder care.

== Sports Medicine ==
A specialized extension of its orthopedic program, Baptist Sports Medicine combines several services under its umbrella, including general orthopedics, physical therapy, aquatic therapy, athletic medicine and occupational therapy. Baptist Sports Medicine is the exclusive health care provider to the Tennessee Titans, Tennessee Secondary School Athletic Association and Lipscomb University.

In 2007, Baptist Sports Medicine managing director Trent Nessler headed a research team to evaluate screening tests and evaluate their predictive value for athletic injury when used as a pre-assessment tool.

Baptist Sports Medicine clinics can be found throughout Middle Tennessee, with locations in downtown Nashville, Antioch, Bellevue, Brentwood, Centerville, Green Hills, Murfreesboro, Pleasant View, Rivergate and Spring Hill, as well as at Lipscomb University.

== Life Therapies ==
Life Therapies offers specialized rehabilitation therapy services in a relaxed, non-hospital atmosphere. Recognizing that the recovery process can be emotionally challenging, Life Therapies services are provided in clinics designed to create a comfortable environment conducive to healing.

Life Therapies clinics offer services for a variety of stages in a patient's life, including treatment of lymphedema, and neurological, post-stroke, vestibular, pediatric, oncology and women's health issues. The staff consists of licensed physical, occupational and speech therapists.

Until January 2009, Life Therapies services were provided under the umbrella of Baptist Sports Medicine. It was determined that establishing the new Life Therapies service line would enable therapists and physicians to better address patients who do not require traditional sports medicine.

The six clinics are found throughout Middle Tennessee, including locations at Baptist Medical Plaza I in downtown Nashville, Green Hills, Maryland Farms YMCA in Brentwood, Spring Hill and two locations in Murfreesboro.

== Center for Pelvic Health ==
The Center for Pelvic Health comprises a multidisciplinary team dedicated to diagnosing and treating pelvic health disorders, with a specific focus on chronic pain and incontinence. The center offers a range of distinctive treatment approaches, including non-surgical interventions (such as cystoscopy, urodynamics, colposcopy, and tibial nerve stimulation), pelvic floor physical therapy (which includes evaluations of posture and pelvic floor muscle function), as well as surgical treatment options (including diagnostic laparoscopy, awake pain mapping, urethral slings, and advanced robotic techniques).

The Center for Pelvic Health is a referral center and works with patients' primary care physicians for treatment.

== Women's health ==
The hospitals within the Saint Thomas Health Services network collaborate to offer a wide range of women's health services, encompassing gynecology, breast health, pelvic health, and birthing services. Additionally, St. Thomas – Midtown Hospital houses a level III neonatal intensive care unit.

== Cancer program ==
Saint Thomas Health Services provides treatment and prevention services for a number of forms of cancer, including brain, breast, cervical, colon, lung, ovarian, prostate, uterine and others.

As part of its treatment, the Saint Thomas Health Services Cancer Program partners with institutions, including Cleveland Clinic and Tennessee Oncology, to partake in community-based clinical trials in oncology and related therapies.

In December 2008, Baptist Hospital's cancer program was recognized by the Commission on Cancer of the American College of Surgeons as offering the best in cancer care. Baptist Hospital received Three-Year Approval with Commendation from the Commission on Cancer.

== Critical care units ==
There are three main intensive care units at St Thomas Midtown Hospital. The Medical ICU, Neuro-Surgical ICU, and the CVICU.

The Medical Intensive Care Unit has 14 beds and treats a variety of critically ill patients. The Surgical Intensive Care Unit also has 14 beds and treats neurological and surgical patients. The CVICU is a new unit developed in 2012 that cares for post-Coronary Artery Bypass patients. A heart doctor from St. Thomas Heart is available in the hospital 24 hours a day, 7 days a week.

In 2008, the Neuro ICU and the Surgical ICU combined their beds to form the current Neuro-Surgical ICU.
