= Santo Tomás de Pata District =

Coordinates: 13.1131°S 74.4193°W

Santo Tomás de Pata Pata
- District
- Interactive map of Santo Tomás de Pata
- Country: Peru
- Region: Huancavelica
- Province: Angaraes
- Founded: May 10, 1955
- Capital: Santo Tomás de Pata

Government
  - Mayor: Mauro Sebastian Ponce Laime

Area
  - Total: 133.57 km^{2} (51.57 sq mi)
- Elevation: 3,156 m (10,354 ft)

Population (2005 census)
  - Total: 1,386
  - Density: 10.38/km^{2} (26.88/sq mi)
- Time zone: UTC-5 (PET)
- UBIGEO: 090311

Santo Tomás de Pata District is one of twelve districts of the province Angaraes in Peru.

== Ethnic groups ==
The people in the district are mainly Indigenous citizens of Quechua descent. Quechua is the language which the majority of the population (81.88%) learnt to speak in childhood, 17.54% of the residents started speaking using the Spanish language (2007 Peru Census).
