= Saint Thomas West Hospital =

Catholic hospital in Nashville, Tennessee, US

- Ascension Saint Thomas

Geography
- Location: 4220 Harding Road, Nashville, Tennessee, United States
- Coordinates: 36.1292°N 86.8443°W

Organization
- Type: General

Services
- Standards: JCAHO accreditation
- Beds: 541

History
- Founded: April 11, 1898

Links
- Website: Saint Thomas West Hospital
- Lists: Hospitals in Tennessee

Saint Thomas West Hospital, formerly Saint Thomas Hospital, is a 541-acute-care-bed health care facility located in Nashville, Tennessee, United States. The hospital sees 21,388 total admissions and 32,000 emergency department visits annually.

Saint Thomas Hospital is one of the Ascension Saint Thomas family of hospitals.

Saint Thomas West Hospital has earned several distinctions from HealthGrades, a third-party organization that evaluates hospitals and physicians. In June 2009, Saint Thomas Hospital was recognized with a 2009/2010 HealthGrades Outstanding Patient Experience Award. In October 2009, HealthGrades gave Saint Thomas Hospital five-star ratings for joint replacement surgery, spine surgery, total knee replacement, treatment of stroke, overall pulmonary care, treatment of pneumonia, vascular surgery, repair of the abdominal aorta, carotid surgery, gastrointestinal surgery, pancreatitis and cholecystectomy.

== History ==
Saint Thomas Hospital was opened in Nashville by the Daughters of Charity. The hospital officially began receiving patients on April 11, 1898. It moved to its current campus, some 4 miles (6.4 km) west of the original, in 1972.

The hospital expanded as the city's health care needs grew. Today, Saint Thomas Hospital is part of Ascension Saint Thomas. The 541-bed facility employs more than 3,500 and has 750 physicians on staff.

In the fall of 2012, the hospital's outpatient neurosurgery unit, along with two other pain treatment centers in Tennessee (Specialty Surgery Center, Crossville; PCA Pain Care Center, Oak Ridge) and cases from other states (especially Virginia, Florida and Maryland) was affected by a non-contagious, fungal (Aspergillosis) strain of meningitis (fungal meningitis). There have been four deaths and 26 total infections, including some in Tennessee, and the center is closed for now. Disparities among some of the biopsy findings were sent to be confirmed by the CDC in Atlanta.

In 2013, the hospital's name was changed to Saint Thomas – West Hospital when its sister hospital, previously called Baptist Hospital (originally Protestant Hospital, but owned in recent years by the same parent organization and located across the street from Saint Thomas' original campus), was renamed "Saint Thomas – Midtown Hospital".
