= 2019 Copa Bicentenario =

Tournament details
- Country: Peru
- Dates: 21 June – 7 November 2019
- Teams: 30

Final positions
- Champions: Atlético Grau (1st title)
- Runners-up: Sport Huancayo
- Copa Sudamericana: Atlético Grau

Tournament statistics
- Matches played: 59
- Goals scored: 161 (2.73 per match)
- Top goal scorer: Carlos Neumann (6 goals)

The 2019 Copa Bicenterio was the 1st edition of the Copa Bicentenario, the new national cup competition of Peru. It was played between June and July while the Peru national football team prepared for and competed in the 2019 Copa América. The tournament was played as a knockout competition, with the participation of the 18 teams of the Liga 1, and 12 teams of the Liga 2. The champions qualified for the 2020 Copa Sudamericana and Supercopa Peruana.

Atlético Grau were winners of the competition, beating Sport Huancayo 4-3 on penalties, winning their first Copa Bicentenario and professional title.

== Format ==
This year's edition used a group stage and knockout stage format. The first stage was played with all 30 teams, each being split into 8 groups of either 3 or 4. Each team plays each other once and the top two advance to the knockout stage. Starting from this point, the cup was played as a single-elimination tournament, with all subsequent rounds being played as one-legged series.

== Schedule ==
The schedule of the competition was as follows:

| Round | First leg |
|---|---|
| Group stage | 21 June – 8 July 2019 |
| Knockout stage | 10 August – 7 November 2019 |
| Round of 16 | 10 August – 12 August 2019 |
| Quarter-finals | 3 September – 5 September 2019 |
| Semi-finals | 25 – 17 October 2019 |
| Final | 7 November 2019 |

== Teams ==
30 teams took part in the tournament, 18 of the 2019 Liga 1 and 12 of the Liga 2.

=== Stadia and locations ===
Locations of the 2019 Liga 1 and Liga 2 teams

| Team | City | Stadium |
Liga 1
| Academia Cantolao | Callao | Miguel Grau |
| Alianza Lima | Lima | Alejandro Villanueva |
| Alianza Universidad | Huánuco | Heraclio Tapia |
| Ayacucho | Ayacucho | Ciudad de Cumaná |
| Binacional | Juliaca | Guillermo Briceño Rosamedina |
| Carlos A. Mannucci | Trujillo | Mansiche |
| Deportivo Municipal | Lima | Miguel Grau |
| Melgar | Arequipa | Virgen de Chapi |
| Pirata | Olmos | Francisco Mendoza Pizarro |
| Real Garcilaso | Cusco | Garcilaso |
| Sport Boys | Callao | Miguel Grau |
| Sport Huancayo | Huancayo | Estadio Huancayo |
| Sporting Cristal | Lima | Alberto Gallardo |
| Unión Comercio | Nueva Cajamarca | IPD de Moyobamba |
| Universidad César Vallejo | Trujillo | Mansiche |
| Universidad San Martín | Lima | Alberto Gallardo |
| Universitario | Lima | Monumental |
| UTC | Cajamarca | Héroes de San Ramón |
Liga 2
| Alianza Atlético | Sullana | Campeones del 36 |
| Atlético Grau | Piura | Municipal de Bernal |
| Cienciano | Cusco | Garcilaso |
| Comerciantes Unidos | Cutervo | Héroes de San Ramón |
| Cultural Santa Rosa | Andahuaylas | Los Chankas |
| Deportivo Coopsol | San Vicente de Cañete | Rómulo Shaw Cisneros |
| Juan Aurich | Chiclayo | César Flores Marigorda |
| Los Caimanes | Puerto Etén | Municipal de la Juventud |
| Santos | Nasca | Municipal de Nasca |
| Sport Loreto | Pucallpa | Aliardo Soria |
| Sport Victoria | Ica | José Picasso Peratta |
| Unión Huaral | Huaral | Julio Lores Colan |

== Group stage ==
=== Group A ===
| Pos | Team | Pld | W | D | L | GF | GA | GD | Pts | Qualification | SCR | CAG | UCV | AA |
|---|---|---|---|---|---|---|---|---|---|---|---|---|---|---|
| 1 | Sporting Cristal | 3 | 2 | 1 | 0 | 6 | 2 | +4 | 7 | Advanced to knockout stage | | | 1–1 | |
| 2 | Atlético Grau | 3 | 1 | 1 | 1 | 4 | 4 | 0 | 4 | Advanced to knockout stage | 1–3 | | 2–0 | |
| 3 | Universidad César Vallejo | 3 | 1 | 1 | 1 | 4 | 4 | 0 | 4 | | | | | 3–1 |
| 4 | Alianza Atlético | 3 | 0 | 1 | 2 | 2 | 6 | −4 | 1 | | 0–2 | 1–1 | | |

Source: ADFP
Rules for classification: Tiebreakers

==== Results ====
| 22 June 2019 | Atlético Grau | 2–0 | Universidad César Vallejo | Estadio Municipal de Bernal, Piura |
| 11:30 | Juan Raúl Neira 13'; Ronal Huaccha 26' | | | Referee: Augusto Menéndez |

| 23 June 2019 | Alianza Atlético | 0–2 | Sporting Cristal | Estadio Campeones del 36, Sullana |
| 11:30 | | | Jorge Cazulo 32'; Cristian Palacios 90+2' | Referee: Edwin Ordóñez |

| 29 June 2019 | Universidad César Vallejo | 3–1 | Alianza Atlético | Estadio Mansiche, Trujillo |
| 17:45 | Arly Benites 17'; Jeremy Rostaing 66'; Germán Pacheco 89' | | Santiago Córdova 37' | Referee: Wilmer Villanueva |

| 30 June 2019 | Atlético Grau | 1–3 | Sporting Cristal | Estadio Municipal de Bernal, Piura |
| 13:15 | Ichiro Plascencia 87' (pen.) | | Carlos Lobatón 8'; Martín Távara 51'; Fernando Pacheco 83' | Referee: Hilbert Villegas |

| 6 July 2019 | Sporting Cristal | 1–1 | Universidad César Vallejo | Estadio Alberto Gallardo |
| 11:15 | Martín Távara 87' (pen.) | | Germán Pacheco 34' | Referee: Miguel Santiváñez |

| 7 July 2019 | Alianza Atlético | 1–1 | Atlético Grau | Estadio Campeones del 36, Sullana |
| 12:00 | Víctor Perlaza 80' | | Víctor Labrín 60' | Referee: Luis Garay |

=== Group B ===
| Pos | Team | Pld | W | D | L | GF | GA | GD | Pts | Qualification | UTC | SBA | COM |
|---|---|---|---|---|---|---|---|---|---|---|---|---|---|
| 1 | UTC | 2 | 2 | 0 | 0 | 2 | 0 | +2 | 6 | Advanced to knockout stage | | 1–0 | |
| 2 | Sport Boys | 2 | 0 | 1 | 1 | 0 | 1 | −1 | 1 | Advanced to knockout stage | | | 0–0 |
| 3 | Comerciantes Unidos | 2 | 0 | 1 | 1 | 0 | 1 | −1 | 1 | | 0–1 | | |

Source: ADFP
Rules for classification: Tiebreakers

==== Results ====
| 23 June 2019 | Comerciantes Unidos | 0–1 | UTC | Estadio Héroes de San Ramón, Cajamarca |
| 15:30 | | | Emiliano Ciucci 47' | Referee: Jordi Espinoza |

| 28 June 2019 | Sport Boys | 0–0 | Comerciantes Unidos | Estadio Miguel Grau, Callao |
| 20:00 | | | | Referee: Jorge Panta |

| 5 July 2019 | UTC | 1–0 | Sport Boys | Estadio Héroes de San Ramón, Cajamarca |
| 15:30 | Jarlín Quintero 12' | | | Referee: José Mendoza |

=== Group C ===
| Pos | Team | Pld | W | D | L | GF | GA | GD | Pts | Qualification | COO | UNI | HUA | CAM |
|---|---|---|---|---|---|---|---|---|---|---|---|---|---|---|
| 1 | Deportivo Coopsol | 3 | 1 | 2 | 0 | 4 | 1 | +3 | 5 | Advanced to knockout stage | | 3–0 | | 1–1 |
| 2 | Universitario | 3 | 1 | 1 | 1 | 2 | 3 | −1 | 4 | Advanced to knockout stage | | | | 2–0 |
| 3 | Unión Huaral | 3 | 0 | 3 | 0 | 3 | 3 | 0 | 3 | | 0–0 | 0–0 | | |
| 4 | Carlos A. Mannucci | 3 | 0 | 2 | 1 | 4 | 6 | −2 | 2 | | | | 3–3 | |

Source: ADFP
Rules for classification: Tiebreakers

==== Results ====
| 22 June 2019 | Deportivo Coopsol | 1–1 | Carlos A. Mannucci | Estadio Rómulo Shaw Cisneros, Chancay |
| 11:30 | Johnny Mena 67' | | Osnar Noronha 53' | Referee: Gherson Huiman |

| 24 June 2019 | Unión Huaral | 0–0 | Universitario | Estadio Segundo Aranda Torres, Huacho |
| 15:30 | | | | Referee: Miguel Santiváñez |

| 30 June 2019 | Deportivo Coopsol | 3–0 | Universitario | Estadio Segundo Aranda Torres, Huacho |
| 15:30 | Danny Kong 11'; Israel Kahn 25'; Brayan Arana 76' | | | Referee: Joel Alarcón |

| 1 July 2019 | Carlos A. Mannucci | 3–3 | Unión Huaral | Estadio Mansiche, Trujillo |
| 20:00 | Ricardo Lagos 39' (pen.); Osnar Noronha 45'; Giancarlo Peña 81' | | Junior Viza 58' (pen.); Miguel Silva 60'; Franco Vivas 65' (pen.) | Referee: David Huamán |

| 6 July 2019 | Unión Huaral | 0–0 | Deportivo Coopsol | Estadio Julio Lores Colán, Huaral |
| 15:30 | | | | Referee: Pablo López |

| 6 July 2019 | Universitario | 2–0 | Carlos A. Mannucci | Estadio Monumental "U" |
| 20:00 | Alejandro Hohberg 63' 90' | | | Referee: Michael Espinoza |

=== Group D ===
| Pos | Team | Pld | W | D | L | GF | GA | GD | Pts | Qualification | CAI | USM | JA | PIR |
|---|---|---|---|---|---|---|---|---|---|---|---|---|---|---|
| 1 | Los Caimanes | 3 | 2 | 1 | 0 | 7 | 5 | +2 | 7 | Advanced to knockout stage | | 2–2 | | 2–1 |
| 2 | Universidad San Martín | 3 | 1 | 2 | 0 | 4 | 2 | +2 | 5 | Advanced to knockout stage | | | | 0–0 |
| 3 | Juan Aurich | 3 | 1 | 0 | 2 | 5 | 6 | −1 | 3 | | 2–3 | 0–2 | | |
| 4 | Pirata | 3 | 0 | 1 | 2 | 2 | 5 | −3 | 1 | | | | 1–3 | |

Source: ADFP
Rules for classification: Tiebreakers

==== Results ====
| 22 June 2019 | Los Caimanes | 2–1 | Pirata | Estadio Municipal de la Juventud, Chongoyape |
| 11:30 | Jefferson Viveros 42'; Germán Carty 79' | | Jossimar Serrato 81' | Referee: Jesús Cartagena |

| 23 June 2019 | Juan Aurich | 0–2 | Universidad San Martín | Estadio Francisco Mendoza Pizarro, Olmos |
| 11:30 | | | Héctor Bazán 61'; José Bolívar 87' | Referee: Renzo Castañeda |

| 29 June 2019 | Pirata | 1–3 | Juan Aurich | Estadio Francisco Mendoza Pizarro, Olmos |
| 11:30 | Junior Aguirre 67' | | Jair Córdova 67'; Miguel Ángel Castro 71'; Brahyan Montenegro 86' | Referee: Eduardo Chirinos |

| 30 June 2019 | Los Caimanes | 2–2 | Universidad San Martín | Estadio Municipal de la Juventud, Chongoyape |
| 13:00 | Jefferson Viveros 17'; César Fernández 37' | | Renato Espinosa 45+2'; Oscar Pinto 90+3' | Referee: Alejandro Villanueva |

| 5 July 2019 | Universidad San Martín | 0–0 | Pirata | Estadio Alberto Gallardo, Lima |
| 13:15 | | | | Referee: Gean Barbagelatta |

| 7 July 2019 | Juan Aurich | 2–3 | Los Caimanes | Estadio César Flores Marigorda, Lambayeque |
| 12:00 | Raúl Acosta 38'; Juan Mayo 86' | | Claudio Velázquez 32' 36'; Wilson Castillo 52' | Referee: Edwin Carranza |

=== Group E ===
| Pos | Team | Pld | W | D | L | GF | GA | GD | Pts | Qualification | UCO | LOR | AUH |
|---|---|---|---|---|---|---|---|---|---|---|---|---|---|
| 1 | Unión Comercio | 2 | 1 | 1 | 0 | 4 | 0 | +4 | 4 | Advanced to knockout stage | | 4–0 | |
| 2 | Sport Loreto | 2 | 1 | 0 | 1 | 2 | 5 | −3 | 3 | Advanced to knockout stage | | | 2–1 |
| 3 | Alianza Universidad | 2 | 0 | 1 | 1 | 1 | 2 | −1 | 1 | | 0–0 | | |

Source: ADFP
Rules for classification: Tiebreakers

==== Results ====
| 22 June 2019 | Sport Loreto | 2–1 | Alianza Universidad | Estadio Aliardo Soria Pérez, Pucallpa |
| 17:45 | Waldir Calderón 17'; Luis Montoya 49' | | Yves Roach 60' | Referee: Joel Alarcón |

| 30 June 2019 | Unión Comercio | 4–0 | Sport Loreto | Estadio IPD de Moyobamba, Moyobamba |
| 11:00 | Edy Rentería 45'; Willyan Mimbela 52'; Sebastián Gularte 57'; Christian Adrianzén 67' | | | Referee: Yovani Quevedo |

| 6 July 2019 | Alianza Universidad | 0–0 | Unión Comercio | Estadio Heraclio Tapia, Huánuco |
| 18:00 | | | | Referee: Kevin Maxdeo |

=== Group F ===
| Pos | Team | Pld | W | D | L | GF | GA | GD | Pts | Qualification | SHU | MUN | SAN | AYA |
|---|---|---|---|---|---|---|---|---|---|---|---|---|---|---|
| 1 | Sport Huancayo | 3 | 3 | 0 | 0 | 7 | 2 | +5 | 9 | Advanced to knockout stage | | 2–0 | 3–1 | |
| 2 | Deportivo Municipal | 3 | 1 | 1 | 1 | 3 | 4 | −1 | 4 | Advanced to knockout stage | | | | 2–1 |
| 3 | Santos | 3 | 0 | 2 | 1 | 4 | 6 | −2 | 2 | | | 1–1 | | 2–2 |
| 4 | Ayacucho | 3 | 0 | 1 | 2 | 4 | 6 | −2 | 1 | | 1–2 | | | |

Source: ADFP
Rules for classification: Tiebreakers

==== Results ====
| 21 June 2019 | Sport Huancayo | 2–0 | Deportivo Municipal | Estadio Huancayo, Huancayo |
| 20:00 | Víctor Balta 43'; Marcio Valverde 90+3' | | | Referee: Fernando Legario |

| 23 June 2019 | Santos | 2–2 | Ayacucho | Estadio Municipal de Nasca, Nasca |
| 15:30 | Johan Sotil 24'; Renzo Alfani 90+3' | | Carlos Preciado 70'; Mauricio Montes 74' | Referee: Ramón Blanco |

| 30 June 2019 | Santos | 1–1 | Deportivo Municipal | Estadio Municipal de Nasca, Nasca |
| 15:30 | Renzo Alfani 69' | | Carlos Flores 52' | Referee: Luis Garay |

| 1 July 2019 | Ayacucho | 1–2 | Sport Huancayo | Estadio Ciudad de Cumaná, Ayacucho |
| 15:30 | Mauricio Montes 30' | | Ricardo Salcedo 27'; Carlos Neumann 66' (pen.) | Referee: Michael Espinoza |

| 5 July 2019 | Deportivo Municipal | 2–1 | Ayacucho | Estadio Miguel Grau, Callao |
| 17:45 | Bogado 52' 59' | | Mauricio Montes 80' | Referee: Bruno Pérez |

| 6 July 2019 | Sport Huancayo | 3–1 | Santos | Estadio Huancayo, Huancayo |
| 17:45 | Oshiro Takeuchi 22'; Luis Maldonado 68'; Carlos Ross 76' | | Mateo Ahmed 33' | Referee: Delvi Dora |

=== Group G ===
| Pos | Team | Pld | W | D | L | GF | GA | GD | Pts | Qualification | RGA | CAN | CIE | CSR |
|---|---|---|---|---|---|---|---|---|---|---|---|---|---|---|
| 1 | Real Garcilaso | 3 | 3 | 0 | 0 | 8 | 2 | +6 | 9 | Advanced to knockout stage | | 3–1 | | |
| 2 | Academia Cantolao | 3 | 2 | 0 | 1 | 5 | 4 | +1 | 6 | Advanced to knockout stage | | | 2–0 | |
| 3 | Cienciano | 3 | 1 | 0 | 2 | 6 | 4 | +2 | 3 | | 1–2 | | | 5–0 |
| 4 | Cultural Santa Rosa | 3 | 0 | 0 | 3 | 1 | 10 | −9 | 0 | | 0–3 | 1–2 | | |

Source: ADFP
Rules for classification: Tiebreakers

==== Results ====
| 21 June 2019 | Cienciano | 1–2 | Real Garcilaso | Estadio Garcilaso, Cusco |
| 15:00 | Hember Valencia 10' | | Danilo Carando 63'; Alfredo Ramúa 90+2' | Referee: Michael Espinoza |

| 23 June 2019 | Cultural Santa Rosa | 1–2 | Academia Cantolao | Estadio Los Chankas, Andahuaylas |
| 15:30 | Kevin Carazas 60' | | Diego Ramírez 64'; Gianfranco Labarthe 90+5' | Referee: José Mendoza |

| 29 June 2019 | Academia Cantolao | 2–0 | Cienciano | Estadio Miguel Grau, Callao |
| 20:00 | Sandro Rengifo 6' 52' | | | Referee: Luis Seminario |

| 30 June 2019 | Cultural Santa Rosa | 0–3 | Real Garcilaso | Estadio Los Chankas, Andahuaylas |
| 15:30 | | | Danilo Carando 34' (pen.) 61'; Javier Núñez 57' | Referee: Edwin Ordóñez |

| 5 July 2019 | Real Garcilaso | 3–1 | Academia Cantolao | Estadio Garcilaso, Cusco |
| 15:00 | Alfredo Ramúa 15'; Hernán Rengifo 45+3'; Danilo Carando 72' | | Junior Ponce 82' | Referee: Gherson Huiman |

| 8 July 2019 | Cienciano | 5–0 | Cultural Santa Rosa | Estadio Garcilaso, Cusco |
| 15:00 | José Cuero 45+2'; Edisson Cucho 52'; Hember Valencia 60'; Alejandro Saravia 79'; Raúl Tito 86' | | | Referee: Yordi Espinoza |

=== Group H ===
| Pos | Team | Pld | W | D | L | GF | GA | GD | Pts | Qualification | BIN | MEL | ALI | SVI |
|---|---|---|---|---|---|---|---|---|---|---|---|---|---|---|
| 1 | Binacional | 3 | 2 | 0 | 1 | 7 | 4 | +3 | 6 | Advanced to knockout stage | | | 4–1 | |
| 2 | Melgar | 3 | 1 | 1 | 1 | 5 | 2 | +3 | 4 | Advanced to knockout stage | 0–1 | | | 4–0 |
| 3 | Alianza Lima | 3 | 1 | 1 | 1 | 4 | 5 | −1 | 4 | | | 1–1 | | |
| 4 | Sport Victoria | 3 | 1 | 0 | 2 | 3 | 8 | −5 | 3 | | 3–2 | | 0–2 | |

Source: ADFP
Rules for classification: Tiebreakers

==== Results ====
| 22 June 2019 | Melgar | 0–1 | Binacional | Estadio Monumental de la UNSA, Arequipa |
| 20:00 | | | Jeferson Collazos 84' | Referee: Luis Garay |

| 23 June 2019 | Sport Victoria | 0–2 | Alianza Lima | Estadio José Picasso Peratta, Ica |
| 15:00 | | | Mauricio Affonso 69' 90' | Referee: Micke Palomino |

| 29 June 2019 | Sport Victoria | 3–2 | Binacional | Estadio José Picasso Peratta, Ica |
| 11:30 | Paulo Basilio 44' 90+3'; Pedro Bautista 77' | | Hervé Kambou 54'; Donald Millán 63' (pen.) | Referee: Roberto Pérez |

| 30 June 2019 | Alianza Lima | 1–1 | Melgar | Estadio Miguel Grau, Callao |
| 17:45 | Kevin Ferreyra 90+4' | | Hideyoshi Arakaki 20' | Referee: Miguel Santiváñez |

| 5 July 2019 | Binacional | 4–1 | Alianza Lima | Estadio Guillermo Briceño Rosamedina, Juliaca |
| 15:30 | Marco Rodríguez 10'; Jeferson Collazos 18' 55'; Roque Guachiré 89' | | Felipe Rodríguez 73' | Referee: Joel Alarcón |

| 5 July 2019 | Melgar | 4–0 | Sport Victoria | Estadio Monumental de la UNSA, Arequipa |
| 20:00 | Bernardo Cuesta 7' 90'; Alexis Arias 8'; Joel Sánchez 79' | | | Referee: Ramón Blanco |

== Final rounds ==
=== Bracket ===
First round
Sporting Cristal | 2 (4)
Sport Boys | 2 (3)
UTC | 2 (6)
Atlético Grau | 2 (7)
Deportivo Coopsol | 1 (5)
Universidad San Martín | 1 (3)
Los Caimanes | 0
Universitario | 2
Unión Comercio | 1
Deportivo Municipal | 2
Sport Huancayo | 4
Sport Loreto | 0
Real Garcilaso | 2
Melgar | 1
Binacional | 3 (2)
Academia Cantolao | 3 (3)

Quarter-finals
Sporting Cristal | 1 (3)
Atlético Grau | 1 (5)
Deportivo Coopsol | 1 (4)
Universitario | 1 (3)
Deportivo Municipal | 0
Sport Huancayo | 4
Real Garcilaso | 0
Academia Cantolao | 1

Semi-finals
Atlético Grau | 3 | 4 | 7
Deportivo Coopsol | 1 | 1 | 2
Sport Huancayo | 2 | 0 | 2
Academia Cantolao | 0 | 0 | 0

Final
Atlético Grau | 0 (4)
Sport Huancayo | 0 (3)

=== Round of 16 ===
| 10 August 2019 | Academia Cantolao | 3–3 (3–2 p) | Binacional | Miguel Grau, Callao |
| 11:00 | Gianfranco Labarthe 17' 61' (pen.); Sandro Rengifo 87' | | Héctor Zeta 30'; Donald Millán 77' (pen.) 89' | Referee: Diego Haro |
| | Penalties |
| | Victor Salas (penalty scored); Gianfranco Labarthe (penalty missed); Denilson Ramírez (penalty scored); Diego Pizarro (penalty scored); Josimar Atoche (penalty missed) | | (penalty scored) Édson Aubert; (penalty missed) Andy Polar; (penalty missed) Jeferson Collazos; (penalty scored) Roque Guachiré; (penalty missed) Donald Millán |

| 10 August 2019 | Unión Comercio | 1–2 | Deportivo Municipal | IPD de Moyobamba, Moyobamba |
| 13:30 | Edy Rentería 49' | | Jeremías Bogado 35' 44' (pen.) | Referee: Joel Alarcón |

| 10 August 2019 | Melgar | 1–2 | Real Garcilaso | Virgen de Chapi, Arequipa |
| 16:00 | Johnny Vidales 91' | | Cristian Souza 30' (pen.); Pablo Míguez 84' | Referee: Augusto Menéndez |

| 10 August 2019 | Sport Loreto | 0–4 | Sport Huancayo | Aliardo Soria, Pucallpa |
| 20:00 | | | Carlos Neumann 21' 84'; Luis Maldonado 32'; Marcio Valverde 88' | Referee: Alejandro Villanueva |

| 11 August 2019 | Deportivo Coopsol | 1–1 (5–3 p) | Universidad San Martín | Segundo Aranda Torres, Huacho |
| 11:00 | Pedro Gutiérrez 66' | | Joffré Escobar 75' | Referee: Luis Garay |
| | Penalties |
| | Carlos Pérez (penalty scored); Édison Silva (penalty scored); Crifford Seminario (penalty scored); Pedro Gutierrez (penalty scored); Israel Khan (penalty scored) | | (penalty scored) Joffré Escobar; (penalty scored) Yamir Oliva; (penalty scored) Héctor Bazán; (penalty missed) John Vega |

| 11 August 2019 | Atlético Grau | 2–2 (7–6 p) | UTC | Municipal de Bernal, Piura |
| 13:00 | | | | Referee: Wilder Espinoza |
| | Penalties |
| | Jair Yglesias (penalty scored); José Marina (penalty scored); Juan Raul Neira (penalty scored); Steven Aponzá (penalty scored); Rony Torres (penalty scored); Jonathan Acasiete (penalty scored); Ronal Huaccha (penalty scored) | | (penalty scored) Sergio Almirón; (penalty scored) Gerardo Martínez; (penalty scored) Emiliano Ciucci; (penalty scored) Josué Estrada; (penalty scored) Jean Deza; (penalty scored) Jarlín Quintero; (penalty missed) Jonathan Segura |

| 11 August 2019 | Los Caimanes | 0–2 | Universitario | Francisco Mendoza Pizarro, Lambayeque |
| 13:00 | | | Aldo Corzo 14'; Alejandro Hohberg 38' | Referee: José Mendoza |

| 12 August 2019 | Sport Boys | 2–2 (3–4 p) | Sporting Cristal | Miguel Grau, Callao |
| 20:00 | Sebastian Gonzales 46'; Luis Peralta 71' (pen.) | | Fernando Pacheco 35'; Gerald Távara 64' | Referee: Kevin Ortega |
| | Penalties |
| | Carlos Urquiaga (penalty scored); Sebastián Gonzales (penalty scored); Jhon Mondragón (penalty missed); Junior Ross (penalty scored); Luis Peralta (penalty missed) | | (penalty scored) Cristian Ortiz; (penalty scored) Cristian Palacios; (penalty scored) Jorge Cazulo; (penalty missed) Omar Merlo; (penalty scored) Carlos Lobatón |

=== Quarterfinals ===
| 3 September 2019 | Atlético Grau | 1–1 (5–3 p) | Sporting Cristal | Municipal de Bernal, Piura |
| 13:30 | Ronal Huaccha 11' | | Carlos Lobatón 86' (pen.) | Referee: Kevin Ortega |

| 4 September 2019 | Deportivo Coopsol | 1–1 (4–3 p) | Universitario | Segundo Aranda Torres, Huacho |
| 15:00 | Pedro Gutiérrez 49' (pen.) | | Rafael Guarderas 17' | Referee: Jorge Panta |

| 4 September 2019 | Sport Huancayo | 4–0 | Deportivo Municipal | Huancayo, Huancayo |
| 20:00 | Carlos Ross 38'; Carlos Neumann 76'; Víctor Peña 86'; Milton Benítez 90+3' | | | Referee: Luis Garay |

| 5 September 2019 | Academia Cantolao | 1–0 | Real Garcilaso | Miguel Grau, Callao |
| 15:00 | Sebastián La Torre 90+4' | | | Referee: José Mendoza |

=== Semifinals ===
==== First leg ====
| 25 September 2019 | Deportivo Coopsol | 1–3 | Atlético Grau | Segundo Aranda Torres, Huacho |
| 15:30 | Carlos Alberto Pérez 43' | | Ronal Huaccha 53'; Steven Aponzá 59' 73' | Referee: José Mendoza |

| 25 September 2019 | Sport Huancayo | 2–0 | Academia Cantolao | Huancayo, Huancayo |
| 20:00 | Carlos Neumann 18' 42' | | | Referee: Edwin Ordóñez |

==== Second leg ====
| 17 October 2019 | Atlético Grau | 4–1 | Deportivo Coopsol | Municipal de Bernal, Piura |
| 13:30 | Steven Aponzá 10' 70'; Ronal Huaccha 56'; Juan Raúl Neira 86' | | Carlos Alberto Pérez 21' | Referee: Michael Espinoza |

| 16 October 2019 | Academia Cantolao | 0–0 | Sport Huancayo | Miguel Grau, Callao |
| 20:00 | | | | Referee: José Luis Martinez |

=== Final ===
| 7 November 2019 | Atlético Grau | 0–0 (4–3 p) | Sport Huancayo | Miguel Grau, Callao |
| 20:00 | | | | Referee: Edwin Ordóñez |
| | Penalties |
| | Jair Yglesias (penalty scored); Roberto Céspedes (penalty missed); Jonathan Acasiete (penalty scored); Juan Neira (penalty scored); Matías Sen (penalty scored) | | Marcio Valverde (penalty scored); Koichi Aparicio (penalty scored); Manuel Corrales (penalty scored); Carlos Neumann (penalty missed); Daniel Morales (penalty missed) |

== Top goalscorers ==
| Rank | Name | Club | Goals |
|---|---|---|---|
| 1 | (Paraguay) Carlos Neumann | Sport Huancayo | 6 |
| 2 | (Colombia) Steven Aponzá | Atlético Grau | 5 |
| 3 | (Paraguay) Jeremías Bogado | Deportivo Municipal | 4 |
| 3 | (Argentina) Danilo Carando | Real Garcilaso | 4 |
| 3 | (Peru) Ronal Huaccha | Atlético Grau | 4 |

== See also ==
- 2019 Torneo de Promoción y Reserva
- 2019 Liga 2
- 2019 Copa Perú
