= 2019 Liga 2 (Peru) =

Liga 2
- Season: 2019
- Dates: 19 May – 30 November 2019
- Champions: Cienciano
- Relegated: Sport Loreto; Los Caimanes; Sport Victoria
- Matches: 126
- Goals: 378 (3 per match)
- Top goalscorer: Ronal Huaccha (19 goals)
- Biggest home win: Atlético Grau 6–0 Cultural Santa Rosa (21 September)
- Biggest away win: Comerciantes Unidos 0–4 Deportivo Coopsol (28 July); Sport Loreto 0–4 Juan Aurich (10 November); Santos 0–4 Deportivo Coopsol (20 November)
- Highest scoring: Sport Loreto 3–6 Atlético Grau (18 August)

The 2019 Liga 2 season was the 67th edition of the second tier of Federación Peruana de Futbol. The season play started in April 2019 and ended on 1 December 2019.

== Competition modus ==
The season has two phases: a home-and-away round-robin phase and a liguilla (league). The team with the most points at the end of the first phase will be crowned 2019 Liga 2 champions and will be promoted to the 2020 Liga 1. The teams who finished 2nd through 7th in the round-robin phase qualify to the liguilla which qualifies two teams to the 2019 Peruvian promotion play-offs. Seeds 4 through 7 play each other. The winners then play the teams in 2nd and 3rd place for a place in the promotion play-offs.

== Teams ==
Before the season, the clubs Deportivo Hualgayoc and Sport Rosario were relegated to the Copa Perú for outstanding debts with the SAFAP.

Sport Victoria was disabled mid-season and relegated to the Copa Perú for outstanding debts with the SAFAP.

=== Team changes ===
Promoted from 2018 Cuadrangular de Ascenso	Relegated from 2018 Primera División	Promoted to 2019 Liga 1	Relegated to 2019 Copa Perú	Relegated to 2021 Copa Perú
▲ Santos (4th)	▼ Sport Rosario (15th) ▼ Comerciantes Unidos (16th)	▲ Universidad César Vallejo (1st) ▲ Carlos A. Mannucci (CA - 1st)	▼ Alfredo Salinas (14th) ▼ Serrato Pacasmayo (15th)	▼ Deportivo Hualgayoc (Retired)

=== Stadia and locations ===
Locations of the 2019 Liga 2 teams

Team	City	Stadium	Capacity
Alianza Atlético	Sullana	Campeones del 36	5,000
Atlético Grau	Piura	Municipal de Bernal	7,000
Cienciano	Cusco	Garcilaso	40,000
Comerciantes Unidos	Cutervo	Juan Maldonado Gamarra	12,000
Cultural Santa Rosa	Andahuaylas	Los Chankas	10,000
Deportivo Coopsol	Chancay	Rómulo Shaw Cisneros	3,000
Juan Aurich	Chiclayo	César Flores Marigorda	7,000
Los Caimanes	Puerto Etén	Municipal de la Juventud	2,000
Santos	Nasca	Municipal de Nasca	10,000
Sport Loreto	Pucallpa	Aliardo Soria	25,000
Sport Victoria	Ica	José Picasso Peratta	8,000
Unión Huaral	Huaral	Julio Lores Colan	10,000

== League table ==
=== Standings ===
Pos	Team	Pld	W	D	L	GF	GA	GD	Pts	Qualification
1	Cienciano (C)	22	14	2	6	56	26	+30	44	2020 Liga 1
2	Alianza Atlético	22	13	4	5	45	21	+24	43	Advance to Liguilla Semifinals
3	Juan Aurich	22	13	3	6	35	24	+11	42	Advance to Liguilla Semifinals
4	Atlético Grau	22	13	2	7	52	30	+22	41	Advance to Liguilla Quarterfinals
5	Santos	22	12	5	5	29	21	+8	41	Advance to Liguilla Quarterfinals
6	Deportivo Coopsol	22	12	3	7	39	27	+12	39	Advance to Liguilla Quarterfinals
7	Comerciantes Unidos	22	10	3	9	32	32	0	33	Advance to Liguilla Quarterfinals
8	Unión Huaral	22	8	7	7	30	29	+1	31	
9	Cultural Santa Rosa	22	9	3	10	25	33	−8	30	
10	Sport Loreto (R)	22	5	3	14	27	46	−19	15 (Note: Sport Loreto was docked a total of 3 points for outstanding debts with the SAFAP.)	Relegation to 2021 Copa Perú
11	Los Caimanes (R)	22	2	2	18	21	54	−33	5 (Note: Los Caimanes was docked a total of 3 points for outstanding debts with the SAFAP.)	Relegation to 2021 Copa Perú
12	Sport Victoria (Note: Sport Victoria was disabled mid-season and relegated to the Copa Perú for outstanding debts with the SAFAP.) (D)	22	2	1	19	9	56	−47	7	Withdrew from league and relegation to 2021 Copa Perú

Source: Liga 2 - official site
Rules for classification: 1) points; 2) goal difference; 3) goals scored; 4) draw.
(C) Champions; (D) Disqualified; (R) Relegated

=== Results ===
Home \ Away	AAS	CIE	COO	COM	CST	CAG	JA	CAI	SAN	LOR	VIC	HUA
Alianza Atlético		3–1	4–1	4–1	2–0	2–0	3–1	3–0	3–0	3–0	3–0	2–0
Cienciano	2–0		5–2	4–1	3–0	4–0	3–1	5–0	4–2	4–2	3–0	0–0
Deportivo Coopsol	1–0	2–1		1–0	0–1	0–0	1–1	3–0	1–2	3–0	3–0	3–0
Comerciantes Unidos	3–1	2–1	0–4		4–1	2–0	1–0	2–1	3–0	2–1	3–0	0–1
Cultural Santa Rosa	1–1	2–1	2–1	3–1		2–1	1–0	3–1	0–1	0–1	3–0	2–2
Atlético Grau	3–1	2–1	4–1	3–1	6–0		3–0	3–2	1–1	4–1	3–0	4–0
Juan Aurich	1–1	2–4	3–1	0–0	1–0	2–0		3–1	2–1	2–1	2–1	2–1
Los Caimanes	1–2	2–3	0–3	1–1	1–3	2–5	1–2		0–0	1–0	3–0	1–2
Santos	1–1	2–1	1–1	2–0	2–0	2–0	0–2	1–0		3–0	1–0	2–1
Sport Loreto	1–0	0–2	2–4	2–0	0–0	3–6	0–4	5–1	0–1		3–3	2–2
Sport Victoria	0–3	0–3	1–2	0–3	2–1	0–3	0–3	2–1	0–3	0–3		0–3
Unión Huaral	3–3	1–1	0–1	2–2	2–0	3–1	0–1	4–1	1–1	1–0	1–0	

Updated to match(es) played on 2 November 2019. Source: Liga 2 - official site
Legend: Blue = home team win; Yellow = draw; Red = away team win.

== Liguilla ==
=== Bracket ===
Quarterfinals
5	Santos	0	0	0
6	Deportivo Coopsol	1	4	5
4	Atlético Grau	2	3	5
7	Comerciantes Unidos	3	0	3

Semifinals
2	Alianza Atlético	0	1	1
6	Deportivo Coopsol	1	1	2
3	Juan Aurich	1	2	3
4	Atlético Grau	4	0	4

Finals
6	Deportivo Coopsol
4	Atlético Grau

=== Quarterfinals ===
Team 1	Agg.	Team 2	1st leg	2nd leg
Comerciantes Unidos	3–5	Atlético Grau	3–2	0–3
Deportivo Coopsol	5–0	Santos	1–0	4–0

==== First leg ====
16 November 2019
13:00

Deportivo Coopsol	1–0	Santos
Pedro Gutiérrez 28'

Estadio Segundo Aranda Torres, Huacho
Referee: Miguel Santiváñez
16 November 2019
15:00

Comerciantes Unidos	3–2	Atlético Grau
Gerson Panduro 24'; Enzo Borges 28'; Cord Cleque 48' (pe.)		Ronal Huaccha 45'; José Marina 61'

Estadio Juan Maldonado Gamarra, Cutervo
Referee: Michael Espinoza

==== Second leg ====
20 November 2019
13:00

Atlético Grau	3–0	Comerciantes Unidos
Víctor Labrín 8' 20'; José Marina 58'

Estadio Municipal de Bernal, Bernal
Referee: Joel Alarcón
20 November 2019
15:00

Santos	0–4	Deportivo Coopsol
		Israel Kahn 43' 74'; Danny Kong 45'; Víctor Eugenio 86'

Municipal de Nasca, Nasca
Referee: Micke Palomino

=== Semifinals ===
Team 1	Agg.	Team 2	1st leg	2nd leg
Deportivo Coopsol	2–1	Alianza Atlético	1–0	1–1
Atlético Grau	4–3	Juan Aurich	4–1	0–2

==== First leg ====
24 November 2019
13:00

Atlético Grau	4–1	Juan Aurich
Ronal Huaccha 30' (pen.) 53' 88'; Dick Ríos 52'		Alejandro Ramírez 27'

Estadio Municipal de Bernal, Bernal
Referee: Augusto Menéndez
25 November 2019
15:30

Deportivo Coopsol	1–0	Alianza Atlético
Brian Bernaola 86'

Estadio Segundo Aranda Torres, Huacho
Referee: Jorge Panta

==== Second leg ====
30 November 2019
19:00

Juan Aurich	2–0	Atlético Grau
Jair Córdova 27' (pen.); Raúl Acosta 73'

Estadio Mansiche, Trujillo
Referee: Luis Garay
1 December 2019
12:15

Alianza Atlético	1–1	Deportivo Coopsol
Víctor Perlazza 70' (pen.)		Johnny Mena 39'

Estadio Campeones del 36, Sullana
Referee: Yovani Quevedo

== Top goalscorers ==
Rank	Name	Club	Goals
1	(Peru) Ronal Huaccha	Atlético Grau	19
2	(Uruguay) Enzo Borges	Comerciantes Unidos	13
3	(Colombia) Victor Perlaza	Alianza Atlético	12
4	(Peru) Jair Cordova	Juan Aurich	10
4	(Colombia) José Cuero	Cienciano	10
6	(Colombia) Steven Aponzá	Atlético Grau	9
7	(Brazil) Ronaille Calheira	Cultural Santa Rosa	8
8	(Peru) Junior Viza	Unión Huaral	8
8	(Paraguay) Óscar Franco	Cienciano	8
10	(Uruguay) Jorge Ramírez	Alianza Atlético	7

== Promotion play-off ==
Pos	Team	Pld	W	D	L	GF	GA	GD	Pts	Qualification
1	Atlético Grau	3	1	2	0	2	0	+2	5	2020 Liga 1
2	Deportivo Llacuabamba	3	1	2	0	3	2	+1	5	2020 Liga 1
3	Deportivo Coopsol	3	1	1	1	5	3	+2	4	2020 Liga 2
4	Sport Chavelines	3	0	1	2	1	6	−5	1	2020 Liga 2

Updated to match(es) played on unknown. Source:
Rules for classification: 1) points; 2) goal difference; 3) goals scored; 4) draw.

== See also ==
- 2019 Liga 1
- 2019 Copa Perú
