= 2018 Peruvian promotion play-offs =

2018 Peruvian promotion play-off
- Season: 2018
- Promoted: Carlos A. Mannucci; Alianza Universidad
- Matches: 6
- Goals: 17 (2.83 per match)
- Highest scoring: Cienciano 3–2 Santos (December 15)

The 2018 Peruvian promotion play-offs or Cuadrangular de Ascenso 2018 was held in December 2018 with all games being played at Estadio Miguel Grau, Callao. The play-offs determined the third and fourth team to be promoted to the Torneo Descentralizado following that tournament's expansion. The teams place 2nd and 3rd in the 2018 Peruvian Segunda División and 2018 Copa Perú took part in the promotion play-offs. The top two placed team in the play-offs gained promotion in the 2019 Torneo Descentralizado and the bottom two qualified to the 2019 Peruvian Segunda División.

== Background ==
The Peruvian Football Federation took control of the local domestic league from the Professional Football Sports Association, the tournament organizers, in 2018 and announced that the Peruvian first division tournament would be re-branded for 2019. With this re-branding, the tournament was expand from 16 to 18 teams. At the beginning of the 2018 season, it was announced that the teams that finished 2nd and 3rd in the bottom two tiers of the Peruvian football league system would compete on the promotion play-offs at the end of the year to decide which two teams would receive the expansion slots.

== Road to the play-offs ==
=== Segunda División ===
==== Liguilla ====
Quarterfinals
4	Unión Huaral	1	2	3
6	Juan Aurich	3	1	4
2	Carlos A. Mannucci	1	5	6
8	Atlético Grau	1	2	3
3	Cienciano	1	3	4
7	Alianza Atlético	1	0	1

Semifinals
1	Universidad César Vallejo (s)	1	2	3
6	Juan Aurich	3	0	3
2	Carlos A. Mannucci	0	5	5
3	Cienciano	2	2	4

Final
1	Universidad César Vallejo	1	3	4
2	Carlos A. Mannucci	1	1	2

===== Third-place play-off =====
Team 1	Agg.	Team 2	1st leg	2nd leg
Juan Aurich	3–4	Cienciano	2–1	1–3

Carlos A. Mannucci and Cienciano advanced to the promotion play-offs.

=== Copa Perú ===
==== Final group stage ====
Pos	Team	Pld	W	D	L	GF	GA	GD	Pts	Qualification
1	Pirata	3	2	0	1	11	3	+8	6	2019 Liga 1
2	Alianza Universidad	3	2	0	1	8	4	+4	6	Promotion Play-off
3	Santos	3	1	0	2	5	10	−5	3	Promotion Play-off
4	UDA	3	1	0	2	2	9	−7	3	

Source: Dechalaca.com
Rules for classification: 1) points; 2) goal difference; 3) goals scored; 4) draw.

Alianza Universidad and Santos advanced to the promotion play-offs.

== Promotion play-offs ==
=== Standings ===
Pos	Team	Pld	W	D	L	GF	GA	GD	Pts	Qualification
1	Carlos A. Mannucci	3	2	1	0	5	3	+2	7	2019 Liga 1
2	Alianza Universidad	3	1	2	0	5	3	+2	5	2019 Liga 1
3	Cienciano	3	1	1	1	4	4	0	4	2019 Liga 2
4	Santos	3	0	0	3	3	7	−4	0	2019 Liga 2

Rules for classification: 1) points; 2) goal difference; 3) goals scored; 4) draw.

=== Results ===
11 December 2018
16:00 PET (UTC-05:00)

Alianza Universidad	1–1	Cienciano
Conde 77'	Report	Sen 35'

Estadio Miguel Grau, Callao
Referee: Micke Palomino
11 December 2018
18:00 PET (UTC-05:00)

Santos	1–2	Carlos A. Mannucci
Romero 88'	Report	Lagos 61'; Naranjo 90+2'

Estadio Miguel Grau, Callao
Referee: Renzo Castañeda
15 December 2018
13:30 PET (UTC-05:00)

Cienciano	3–2	Santos
Ross 45'; Sen 53' 61'		Coronado 16' 42'

Estadio Miguel Grau, Callao
Referee: Jesús Cartagena
15 December 2018
15:30 PET (UTC-05:00)

Carlos A. Mannucci	2–2	Alianza Universidad
Noronha 10' 42'		Portilla 26'; Durán 63'

Estadio Miguel Grau, Callao
Referee: Miguel Santiváñez
18 December 2018
16:00 PET (UTC-05:00)

Alianza Universidad	2–0	Santos
Encinas 15'; Durán 38'

Estadio Miguel Grau, Callao
Referee: Augusto Menéndez
18 December 2018
18:00 PET (UTC-05:00)

Carlos A. Mannucci	1–0	Cienciano
Lagos 49'

Estadio Miguel Grau, Callao
Referee: Kevin Ortega

== See also ==
- 2019 Torneo Descentralizado
- 2018 Peruvian Segunda División
- 2018 Copa Perú
