= Jair Yglesias =

Peruvian footballer (born 1981)

Personal information
- Full name: Jorge Jair Yglesias Cárdenas
- Date of birth: February 10, 1981 (age 45)
- Place of birth: Callao, Peru
- Height: 1.80 m (5 ft 11 in)
- Position: Left back

Team information
- Current team: Juan Aurich

Senior career*
Years	Team	Apps	(Gls)
1999–2002	Sport Boys		
2002	Sport Coopsol Trujillo		
2002–2003	Sport Boys		
2004	Coronel Bolognesi		
2005	Cienciano		
2006–2007	Alianza Lima		
2008	José Gálvez FBC	39	(3)
2009–2010	Universidad César Vallejo	42	(1)
2011–2012	Sport Boys	26	(2)
2013	UT Cajamarca	9	(0)
2014–2015	Unión Comercio	47	(2)
2015–2016	Ayacucho	31	(1)
2016–2017	Unión Comercio	53	(1)
2018	Juan Aurich	3	(0)
2019-2020	Atlético Grau	43	(2)
2023	FC San Marcos de Huari	3	(0)
- * Club domestic league appearances and goals as of 5 May 2018

Jorge Jair Yglesias Cárdenas (born February 10, 1981, in Callao) is a former Peruvian footballer. He played as a left back.

== Honours ==
=== Club ===
Cienciano del Cuzco:

- Torneo Apertura: 2005

Alianza Lima:

- Torneo Apertura: 2006
- Peruvian First Division: 2006

Atlético Grau

- 2019 Copa Bicentenario
- 2020 Supercopa Peruana
