= 2019 Club Universitario de Deportes season =

Universitario de Deportes
2019 season
- Manager: Nicolas Cordova; Ángel Comizzo
- Stadium: Estadio Monumental
- Peruvian Primera División: 4th
- Copa Bicentenario: Quarterfinals
Home colours	Away colours

The 2019 season was Universitario de Deportes' 95th season since its founding in 1924. The club played the Liga 1 and the Copa Bicentenario.

== Competitions ==
=== Liga 1 ===
==== Apertura ====
Pos	Team	Pld	W	D	L	GF	GA	GD	Pts
11	Melgar	17	6	5	6	26	25	+1	23
12	Universitario	17	6	5	6	25	27	−2	23
13	Alianza Universidad	17	5	7	5	18	18	0	22

Results

Home \ Away	ALI	AUH	AYA	BIN	CAM	CAN	MUN	MEL	PIR	RGA	SBA	SHU	CRI	UCO	UCV	USM	UNI	UTC
Alianza Lima	—	—	—	—	—	—	—	—	—	—	—	—	—	—	—	—	2–3	—
Alianza Universidad	—	—	—	—	—	—	—	—	—	—	—	—	—	—	—	—	—	—
Ayacucho	—	—	—	—	—	—	—	—	—	—	—	—	—	—	—	—	2–0	—
Binacional	—	—	—	—	—	—	—	—	—	—	—	—	—	—	—	—	4–2	—
Carlos A. Mannucci	—	—	—	—	—	—	—	—	—	—	—	—	—	—	—	—	—	—
Cantolao	—	—	—	—	—	—	—	—	—	—	—	—	—	—	—	—	1–0	—
Deportivo Municipal	—	—	—	—	—	—	—	—	—	—	—	—	—	—	—	—	—	—
Melgar	—	—	—	—	—	—	—	—	—	—	—	—	—	—	—	—	2–1	—
Pirata	—	—	—	—	—	—	—	—	—	—	—	—	—	—	—	—	—	—
Real Garcilaso	—	—	—	—	—	—	—	—	—	—	—	—	—	—	—	—	0–0	—
Sport Boys	—	—	—	—	—	—	—	—	—	—	—	—	—	—	—	—	—	—
Sport Huancayo	—	—	—	—	—	—	—	—	—	—	—	—	—	—	—	—	—	—
Sporting Cristal	—	—	—	—	—	—	—	—	—	—	—	—	—	—	—	—	1–1	—
Unión Comercio	—	—	—	—	—	—	—	—	—	—	—	—	—	—	—	—	1–1	—
Universidad César Vallejo	—	—	—	—	—	—	—	—	—	—	—	—	—	—	—	—	—	—
Universidad San Martín	—	—	—	—	—	—	—	—	—	—	—	—	—	—	—	—	2–3	—
Universitario	—	1–1	—	—	1–0	—	2–4	—	3–1	—	4–0	1–1	—	—	0–4	—	—	2–1
UTC	—	—	—	—	—	—	—	—	—	—	—	—	—	—	—	—	—	—

Source: ADFP, Soccerway
Legend: Blue = home team win; Yellow = draw; Red = away team win.

==== Clausura ====
Pos	Team	Pld	W	D	L	GF	GA	GD	Pts
1	Alianza Lima	17	10	5	2	32	23	+9	35
2	Universitario	17	9	6	2	16	10	+6	33
3	Sporting Cristal	17	9	4	4	31	20	+11	31

Results

Home \ Away	ALI	AUH	AYA	BIN	CAM	CAN	MUN	MEL	PIR	RGA	SBA	SHU	CRI	UCO	UCV	USM	UNI	UTC
Alianza Lima	—	—	—	—	—	—	—	—	—	—	—	—	—	—	—	—	—	—
Alianza Universidad	—	—	—	—	—	—	—	—	—	—	—	—	—	—	—	—	0–1	—
Ayacucho	—	—	—	—	—	—	—	—	—	—	—	—	—	—	—	—	—	—
Binacional	—	—	—	—	—	—	—	—	—	—	—	—	—	—	—	—	—	—
Carlos A. Mannucci	—	—	—	—	—	—	—	—	—	—	—	—	—	—	—	—	1–0	—
Cantolao	—	—	—	—	—	—	—	—	—	—	—	—	—	—	—	—	—	—
Deportivo Municipal	—	—	—	—	—	—	—	—	—	—	—	—	—	—	—	—	3–0	—
Melgar	—	—	—	—	—	—	—	—	—	—	—	—	—	—	—	—	—	—
Pirata	—	—	—	—	—	—	—	—	—	—	—	—	—	—	—	—	0–1	—
Real Garcilaso	—	—	—	—	—	—	—	—	—	—	—	—	—	—	—	—	—	—
Sport Boys	—	—	—	—	—	—	—	—	—	—	—	—	—	—	—	—	0–0	—
Sport Huancayo	—	—	—	—	—	—	—	—	—	—	—	—	—	—	—	—	0–1	—
Sporting Cristal	—	—	—	—	—	—	—	—	—	—	—	—	—	—	—	—	—	—
Unión Comercio	—	—	—	—	—	—	—	—	—	—	—	—	—	—	—	—	—	—
Universidad César Vallejo	—	—	—	—	—	—	—	—	—	—	—	—	—	—	—	—	0–0	—
Universidad San Martín	—	—	—	—	—	—	—	—	—	—	—	—	—	—	—	—	—	—
Universitario	1–0	—	3–2	2–0	—	1–1	—	2–1	—	1–0	—	—	0–0	2–1	—	0–0	—	—
UTC	—	—	—	—	—	—	—	—	—	—	—	—	—	—	—	—	1–1	—

Source: ADFP, Soccerway
Legend: Blue = home team win; Yellow = draw; Red = away team win.

=== Copa Bicentenario ===
==== Group stage ====
Pos	Team	Pld	W	D	L	GF	GA	GD	Pts	Qualification	COO	UNI	HUA	CAM
1	Deportivo Coopsol	3	1	2	0	4	1	+3	5	Advanced to knockout stage	—	3–0	—	—
2	Universitario	3	1	1	1	2	3	−1	4	Advanced to knockout stage	—	—	—	2–0
3	Unión Huaral	3	0	3	0	3	3	0	3		—	0–0	—	—
4	Carlos A. Mannucci	3	0	2	1	4	6	−2	2		—	—	—	—

Source: ADFP
Rules for classification: Tiebreakers

==== Round of 16 ====
11 August 2019	Los Caimanes	0–2	Universitario	Francisco Mendoza Pizarro, Lambayeque
13:00			Aldo Corzo 14'; Alejandro Hohberg 38'	Referee: José Mendoza

==== Quarterfinals ====
4 September 2019	Deportivo Coopsol	1–1 (4–3 p)	Universitario	Segundo Aranda Torres, Huacho
	Pedro Gutiérrez 49' (pen.)		Rafael Guarderas 17'	Referee: Jorge Panta
