= Supercopa Peruana =

- Founded: 2020; 6 years ago
- Abolished: 2022
- Region: Peru
- Teams: 2
- Related competitions: Liga 1 Liga 2 Copa Bicentenario
- Last champions: Atlético Grau (1st title)
- Most championships: Atlético Grau (1 title)

The Supercopa Peruana, (Peruvian Supercup) is a football competition organized by the Peruvian Football Federation since 2020. It is played in a single match, on a neutral field, which, if necessary, breaks the tie with shots from the penalty spot. It is played between the champions of the Copa Bicentenario and Peruvian Primera División. In the event that the same team wins both the cup and the championship, its opponent will be the runner-up of the latter.

== History ==
=== Background ===
In 1919, the Liga Peruana de Football, now known as the Asociación Deportiva de Fútbol Profesional, established a super cup reserved for First Division champions. Club Alianza Lima, champions of the 1919 Liga Peruana de Football, won the Copa de Campeones del Perú “Felipe Ríos” after defeating Jorge Chávez N°1, champions of the 1913 Liga Peruana de Football, by a score of 2–0.

In 2012, the Peruvian Football Federation revived the super cup format under the name Copa Federación. The match was contested between José Gálvez, champions of the 2011 Torneo Intermedio, and Club Juan Aurich, champions of the 2011 Peruvian Primera División. The club from Chimbote won 1–0 and was crowned champion.

Later, in 2018, the Asociación Deportiva de Fútbol Profesional, with sponsorship from Movistar, organized a new version of the competition called the 2018 Supercopa Movistar. The tournament was played between Alianza Lima, champions of the 2017 Torneo Descentralizado, and Sport Boys, champions of the 2017 Peruvian Segunda División. The title was won by Alianza Lima after a 1–0 victory.

=== Liga de Fútbol Profesional ===
The Peruvian Football Federation took control of the local domestic league from the Professional Football Sports Association, the tournament organizers, in 2019 and announced that the Peruvian first division tournament would be re-branded for 2019. With this re-branding, the tournament was expanded from 16 to 18 teams and then to 20 in 2020. Also, The second division tournament was re-branded as Liga 2.

The Peruvian Football Federation also announced the creation of a new domestic cup tournament to be played once a year by both the first and second division teams, the winner of which would receive a berth to the Copa Sudamericana. The new domestic cup tournament was named Copa Bicentenario in honor of Peru's bicentennial. In 2020, the Peruvian Football Federation announced the creation of a super cup between the Copa Bicentenario champion and the Liga 1 champion to serve as a "curtain-raiser" to the season. The name of the new tournament is Supercopa Peruana, Peruvian Super Cup, which is expected to be played in January of every year before the start of the regular season tournaments.

Binacional and Atlético Grau played the first edition of the new Super Cup tournament in 2020. Atlético Grau defeated Binacional by 3–0 to win the 3rd title in its history.

== Finals ==
Key

- CB = Winner of the Copa Bicentenario.
- PD = Winner of the respective Primera División.

Ed.	Year	Champion	Score	Runner-up	Venue	Winning manager
1	2020	Atlético Grau (CB) (1)	3–0	Binacional (PD)	Estadio Miguel Grau, Callao	(Peru) Pablo Zegarra
–	2021	Canceled due to the COVID-19 pandemic				
–	2022	Canceled due to the reforms of Peruvian football by the FPF				

== Performances by club ==
Rank	Club	Winners	Runners-up	Winning years	Runners-up years
1	Atlético Grau	1	0	2020	—
—	Binacional	0	1	—	2020
