= Copa Bicentenario =

- Organiser(s): FPF
- Founded: 2019; 7 years ago
- Abolished: 2022
- Region: Peru
- Teams: 36
- Qualifier for: Copa Sudamericana
- Related competitions: Liga 1 Liga 2 Supercopa Peruana
- Last champions: Sporting Cristal (1st title)
- Most championships: Atlético Grau (1 title each); Sporting Cristal
- Broadcaster: GolPeru

The Copa Bicentenario was a football competition in Peru played by the football clubs of the Liga 1 and Liga 2. It was organized by the Peruvian Football Federation and was played as a domestic football cup competition between clubs of the first and second division, featuring 36 teams. The winners qualified for the Copa Sudamericana and Supercopa Peruana. The tournament was played in between the Liga 1's Apertura and Clausura, around June to August. It is named after the bicentennial of Peruvian Independence.

The Copa Bicentenario was founded in 2019 as a plan to make the Peruvian football league system more competitive. Multiple previous attempts were made to create domestic cups such as the Torneo del Inca, but none were fully implemented, only being used for a few seasons. Along with the Copa Bicentenario, the Supercopa Peruana was created, a supercup between Liga 1 and Copa Bicentenario champions.

Sporting Cristal were the defending champions. Sporting Cristal and Atlético Grau are the two record holders, sharing one title.

== Format ==
A total of 36 teams participate in the Copa Bicentenario, 18 from the Peruvian Primera División and 18 from the Segunda División. In previous editions, there were 30 teams from the First and Second Division.

The format of the Copa Bicentenario has fluctuated since its creation. In the 2019 edition, the tournament used a group stage knockout format, where each team is seeded into a group of either three or four, and play in a round robin system, with the top two teams entering the knockout round and the winner becoming champion. In 2021, the format changed to a full knockout stage. The winners of the first round advance to the final round, which was the knockout stage. A round of 16 is played, then quarter-finals, semi-finals and final. Each final is a single match with no home and away matches. The winners of the Copa Bicentenario qualify for the Copa Sudamericana

== History ==
In Peru, there has never been a championship with the exception of the Copa de Campeones del Perú which was formed in 1919. Many attempts were made to create a championship for both Liga 1 and Liga 2 teams but all have been kept inactive. The Copa Bicentenario was the first championship formed, along with the Supercopa Peruana to give teams more competition. The tournament was named after the "Bicentennial" in honor of the bicentennial of Peruvian Independence in 1821.

Due to the 2019 Copa América, at the end of the 2019 Liga 1's Apertura, the tournament was played, with the participation of the 18 teams of the Liga 1, and 12 teams of the Liga 2. The winners qualified for the 2020 Copa Sudamericana. The tournament uses a Group Stage round-robin system, where the top two teams of each group advance to the knockout stage. Liga 1 champions, Sporting Cristal lost to Liga 2 team, Atlético Grau. Surprisingly, Atletico Grau won the tournament, defeating Sport Huancayo. They would later be promoted to the Liga 1.

In 2020, the Copa Bicentenario was canceled due to the COVID-19 pandemic. Unlike the Group Stage round-robin format of the first edition, the tournament changed to a bracket system with two rounds. The first round was between all teams, in which the winners advance to the final round, another bracket starting off with the Round of 16. Defending champions of the 2020 Liga 1, Sporting Cristal won the tournament. On August 23, it was announced that the Copa Bicentenario was canceled in order for the Peru national football team to focus on their 2022 FIFA World Cup play-off with Australia, along with reforms made to Peruvian football by the FPF.

Due to the 2024 Copa América, at the end of the 2024 Liga 1's Apertura, the Copa Bicentenario will be played once again, with the participation of the 18 teams of the Liga 1, and 18 teams of the Liga 2. The winners will qualify for the 2025 Copa Sudamericana. However, the Copa Bicentenario was eventually cancelled and will no longer continue. The tournament was replaced by the Copa de la Liga in 2025 as Peru's national cup competition after not being played in 3 years.

== Finals ==
- (In bracket, title count):

Ed.	Year	Champion	Scores	Runner-up	Venue	Winning manager
1	2019	Atlético Grau (1)	0–0 (4–3 p)	Sport Huancayo	Miguel Grau, Callao	(Peru) Wilmar Valencia
–	2020	Canceled due to the COVID-19 pandemic.				
2	2021	Sporting Cristal (1)	2–1	Carlos A. Mannucci	Alejandro Villanueva, Lima	(Peru) Roberto Mosquera
–	2022	Canceled due to the reforms of Peruvian football by the FPF.				

== Titles by club ==
Rank	Club	Winners	Runners-up	Winning years	Runners-up years
1	Atlético Grau	1	0	2019	—
1	Sporting Cristal	1	0	2021	—
—	Carlos A. Mannucci	0	1	—	2021
—	Sport Huancayo	0	1	—	2019

== Topscorers ==
Rank	Year(s)	Player	Goals	Club(s)
1	2019, 2021	(Paraguay) Carlos Neumann	6	Sport Huancayo, Alianza Universidad
2	2019, 2021	(Colombia) Steven Aponzá	5	Deportivo Coopsol, Sport Chavelines
3	2019	(Argentina) Danilo Carando	4	Cusco
3	2019	(Paraguay) Jeremías Bogado	4	Deportivo Municipal
3	2019	(Peru) Ronal Huaccha	4	Sport Huancayo
4	2021	(Colombia) Yorleys Mena	3	Universidad César Vallejo
