= Christian Vásquez =

Christian Vásquez may refer to:

- Christian Vásquez (conductor) (born 1984), Venezuelan conductor and violinist
- Christian Vásquez (footballer) (born 2001), Peruvian footballer

== See also ==
- Christian Vasquez (born 1977), Filipino actor and model
- Christian Vázquez (disambiguation), several people
