= Iván Cruz (footballer) =

Peruvian footballer (born 1999)

Personal information
- Full name: Iván Leonardo Cruz Navarro
- Date of birth: 24 May 1999 (age 27)
- Place of birth: Barranco, Peru
- Height: 1.74 m (5 ft 9 in)
- Position: Left-back

Team information
- Current team: Juventud Bellavista

Youth career
- Alianza Lima

Senior career*
Years	Team	Apps	(Gls)
2018–2020	Alianza Lima	0	(0)
2019	→ Ayacucho (loan)	7	(0)
2020	Santos de Nasca	4	(0)
2021	Comerciantes Unidos	0	(0)
2022	Santos de Nasca	1	(0)
2025–	Juventud Bellavista		

International career
2017	Peru U-18	4	(0)
- * Club domestic league appearances and goals as of 22:15, 11 December 2022 (UTC)

Iván Leonardo Cruz Navarro (born 24 May 1999) is a Peruvian footballer who plays as a left-back for Juventud Bellavista.

== Club career ==
=== Alianza Lima ===
Cruz is a product of Alianza Lima and was promoted to the club's first team in the Peruvian Primera División for the 2018 season. However, he continued to play for the club's reserve team. In January 2019, he was loaned out to Ayacucho FC, where he made a total of seven appearances in the Peruvian Primera División.

Cruz returned to Alianza for the 2020 season and continued on the reserve team. In the summer 2020, he moved to Santos de Nasca. He left the club at the end of the year.

In May 2021, Cruz joined Comerciantes Unidos. In January 2022, he returned to Santos de Nasca.

== International career ==
In March 2017, Cruz was called up for the Peruvian U18 national team.
