= 2020 Supercopa Peruana =

Peruvian football super cup

- Event: Supercopa Peruana
| Atlético Grau | Binacional |
| Copa Bicentenario | Liga 1 |
| 3 | 0 |
- Date: 23 January 2020
- Venue: Estadio Miguel Grau, Callao
- Referee: Diego Haro

The 2020 Supercopa Peruana was the 1st edition of the Supercopa Peruana, an annual football super cup contested by the winners of the previous season's Liga 1 and Copa Bicentenario competitions.

The match was played between the 2019 Copa Bicentenario champion, Atlético Grau, and the winners of the 2019 Liga 1, Binacional.

== Qualified teams ==
| Team | Qualification |
|---|---|
| Binacional | 2019 Liga 1 champion |
| Atlético Grau | 2019 Copa Bicentenario champion |

== Match details ==
January 23, 2020
18:30

| Atlético Grau | 3–0 | Binacional |
|---|---|---|
| Neira 22'; Lasso 24'; Collazos 73' | Report |

Estadio Miguel Grau, Callao
Referee: Diego Haro

| Atlético Grau | Binacional |

Assistant referees:
Víctor Ráez
Michael Orué
Fourth official:
Joel Alarcón

Match rules

- 90 minutes.
- Penalty shoot-out if scores still level.
- Seven named substitutes.
- Maximum of three substitutions.

2020 Supercopa Peruana winners
Atlético Grau
1st Title
