= Freddy Oncoy =

Peruvian footballer (born 2000)

Personal information
- Full name: Freddy Alejandro Oncoy Huarote
- Date of birth: 29 September 2000 (age 26)
- Place of birth: Lima, Peru
- Height: 1.82 m (6 ft 0 in)
- Position: Midfielder

Team information
- Current team: UTC
- Number: 13

Youth career
- Sport Boys

Senior career*
| Years | Team | Apps | (Gls) |
| 2019–2020 | Sport Boys | 26 | (0) |
| 2021–2024 | Melgar | 25 | (1) |
| 2023 | → Binacional (loan) | 32 | (7) |
| 2024 | → Atlético Grau (loan) | 26 | (3) |
| 2025– | UTC | 36 | (1) |

International career
| 2017 | Peru U17 | 3 | (0) |
- * Club domestic league appearances and goals as of 22:24, 6 December 2025 (UTC)

Freddy Alejandro Oncoy Huarote (born 29 September 2000) is a Peruvian footballer who plays as a midfielder for Peruvian Primera División side UTC.

== Ccareer ==
=== Club career ===
Oncoy was promoted to the first team squad in the summer 2018 at the age of 17. He got his official debut for Sport Boys on 28 October 2018 against Carlos A. Mannucci. Oncoy started on the bench, before replacing Luis Magallanes in the 58th minute. Oncoy made a total of 4 appearances for Sport Boys in the 2019 Torneo Descentralizado season.

In December 2024, ahead of the 2025 season, Oncoy signed with Peruvian Primera División side UTC Cajamarca.

== International career ==
Oncoy made two appearances for Peru U17 in the 2017 South American U-17 Championship against Brazil U17 and Argentina U17. He also played in a friendly game against Bolivia U17.
