= Patricio Álvarez =

Peruvian footballer (born 1994)

Personal information
- Full name: Patricio Leonel Álvarez Noguera
- Date of birth: 24 January 1994 (age 32)
- Place of birth: Lima, Peru
- Height: 1.80 m (5 ft 11 in)
- Position: Goalkeeper

Team information
- Current team: Atlético Grau
- Number: 1

Youth career
- Universitario

Senior career*
Years	Team	Apps	(Gls)
2012-2014	Universitario	1	(0)
2015–2018	Melgar	43	(0)
2018–2020	Sporting Cristal	33	(0)
2021–2023	Sport Boys	58	(0)
2023	Cienciano	0	(0)
2023-	Atlético Grau	91	(0)

International career
	Peru U20	0	(0)
2018–2019	Peru	0	(0)
Medal record
Men's football
Representing Peru
Copa América
Runner-up	2019 Brazil
- * Club domestic league appearances and goals as of 26 May 2026

Patricio Leonel Álvarez Noguera (born 24 January 1994) is a Peruvian professional footballer who plays as a goalkeeper for Atlético Grau.

== Career ==
Alvarez was at Club Universitario de Deportes from 2012 to 2014 before joining FBC Melgar with whom in 2015 Alvarez won the Peruvian Primera División. In December 2017 Alvarez signed a three-year contract with Sporting Cristal, joining from Melgar. After a spell with Sport Boys from 2021 to 2023, and a short spell with Cienciano, he joined Atlético Grau in 2023. On 17 May 2024, he scored his first professional goal, a penalty in a 4-0 win over Cusco FC.

== International career ==
On 28 September 2018 Alvarez was called up to the Peru national team for the matches against the United States and Chile.

== Personal life ==
He has that nickname 'Pato'.

== Honours ==
Universitario de Deportes

- Torneo Descentralizado: 2013

FBC Melgar

- Peruvian Primera División: 2015

Sporting Cristal

- Primera División (2): 2018, 2020
