= Aamet Calderón =

Peruvian footballer (born 1998)

Personal information
- Full name: Aamet José Guillermo Calderón Tello
- Date of birth: 1 July 1998 (age 28)
- Place of birth: Ica, Peru
- Height: 1.84 m (6 ft 0 in)
- Position: Goalkeeper

Team information
- Current team: Atlético Grau
- Number: 33

Youth career
- 2015–2016: Universitario

Senior career*
Years	Team	Apps	(Gls)
2017–	Universitario	0	(0)
2017	→ Santa Rosa (loan)	2	(0)
2026–	→ Atlético Grau (loan)	0	(0)
- * Club domestic league appearances and goals as of 4 February 2024

Aamet José Guillermo Calderón Tello (born 1 July 1998) is a Peruvian footballer who plays as a goalkeeper for Peruvian Liga 1 club Atlético Grau on loan from Universitario de Deportes.

== Club career ==
He played in the youth ranks of Universitario de Deportes. In 2017, he was briefly loaned to Cultural Santa Rosa in the Peruvian Second Division, where he played 2 matches.

== Honours ==
Universitario de Deportes

- Peruvian Primera División: 2023
- Peruvian Primera División: 2024
- Peruvian Primera División: 2025
