= José Cuero =

Colombian footballer (born 1990)

Personal information
- Full name: José Adalberto Cuero García
- Date of birth: March 30, 1990 (age 36)
- Place of birth: Bogotá, Colombia
- Height: 1.84 m (6 ft 0 in)
- Position: Midfielder

Team information
- Current team: UTC
- Number: 7

Youth career
- 2008–2009: Millonarios

Senior career*
Years	Team	Apps	(Gls)
2010	Millonarios	1	(0)
2011	León de Huánuco	1	(0)
2012–2016	Alianza Universidad	106	(21)
2017	Deportivo Hualgayoc	27	(4)
2018	Carlos A. Mannucci	28	(1)
2019–2020	Cienciano	28	(13)
2021	Atlético Huila	11	(0)
2022	Santos de Nasca	15	(2)
2023	Alfonso Ugarte de Puno	21	(5)
2024	Deportivo Garcilaso	8	(0)
2024–	UTC	13	(0)
- * Club domestic league appearances and goals as of 2 November 2024

José Adalberto Cuero García (born March 30, 1990), known as José Cuero, is a Colombian footballer, who plays in Peru for UTC, as a midfielder. Cuero is a product of the Millonarios youth system and played with the Millonarios first team since March, 2010.
