= Ronal Huaccha =

Peruvian footballer (born 1993)

Personal information
- Full name: Ronal Omar Huaccha Jurado
- Date of birth: 20 December 1993 (age 32)
- Place of birth: Callao, Peru
- Height: 1.73 m (5 ft 8 in)
- Position: Forward

Team information
- Current team: Sport Huancayo

Senior career*
Years	Team	Apps	(Gls)
2013–2017	Unión Comercio		
2018	Comerciantes Unidos		
2019	Atlético Grau		
2020–	Sport Huancayo		
- * Club domestic league appearances and goals

Ronal Omar Huaccha Jurado (born on 20 December 1993) is a Peruvian professional footballer who plays as forward for Sport Huancayo, a Liga 1 club.

== Playing career ==
Having come through the ranks at Unión Comercio and after a stint with Comerciantes Unidos, Ronal Huaccha made a name for himself in 2019 as the top scorer in the 2nd division championship with Atlético Grau. That same year, he won the Copa Bicentenario with the same club. In 2020, he signed for Sport Huancayo, the club where he still plays.

== Honours ==
Atlético Grau

- Copa Bicentenario: 2019
- Liga 2 Top scorer: 2019 (19 goals)
