= Christian Vázquez (disambiguation) =

Christian Vázquez may refer to:

- Christian Vázquez (born 1990), Puerto Rican baseball catcher
- Christian Vázquez (actor) (born c. 1986), Mexican actor

== See also ==
- Cristian Vázquez (born 1998), Argentine footballer
- Christian Vásquez, several people
