= Estadio Miguel Grau (Piura) =

Multi-use stadium in Piura, Peru

- Coloso Miraflorino
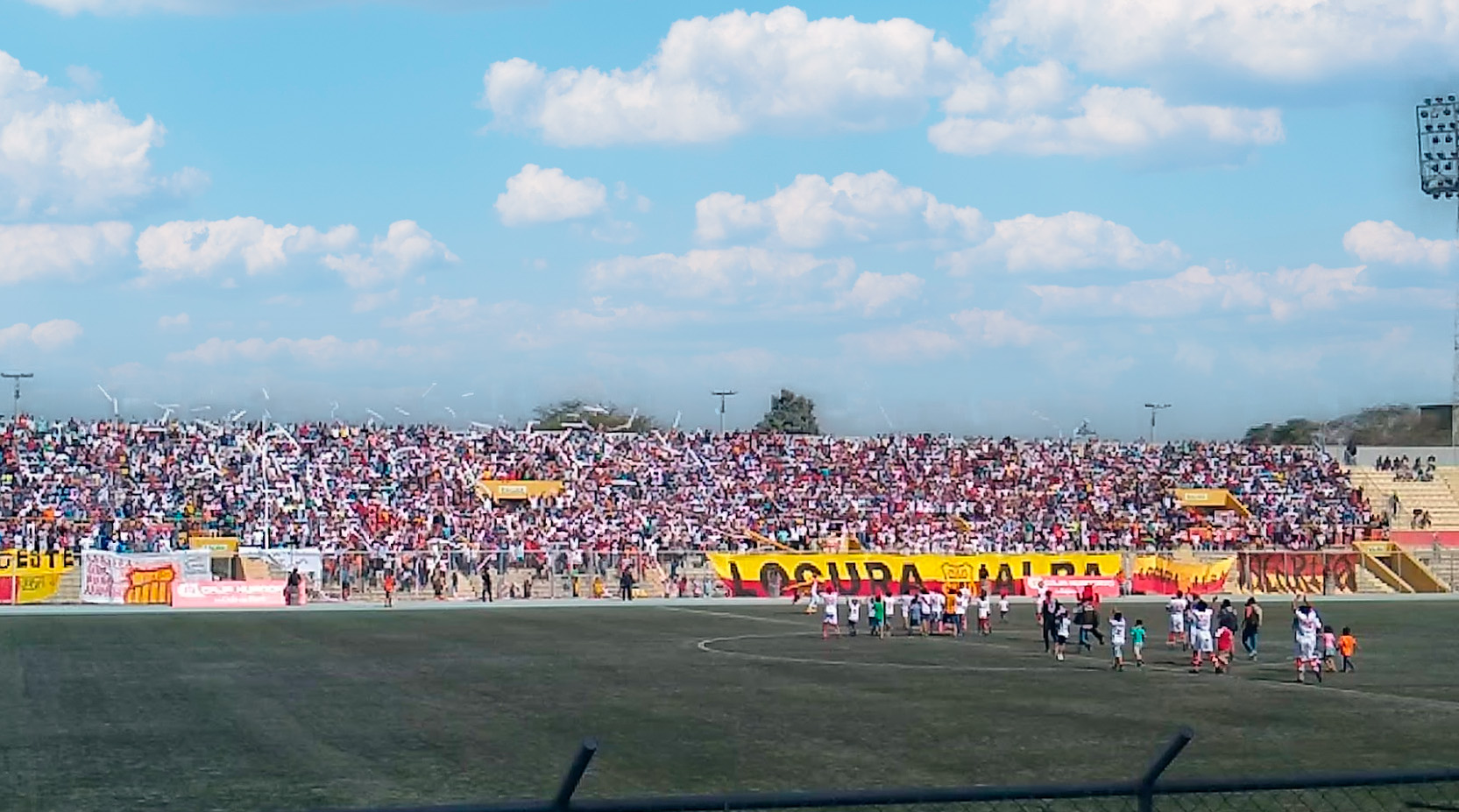
- Interactive map of Estadio Miguel Grau
- Full name: Estadio Miguel Grau
- Location: Piura, Peru
- Coordinates: 5.191763°S 80.616195°W
- Owner: Instituto Peruano del Deporte
- Capacity: 25,500
- Surface: Polytan Ligaturf 240 ACS 65
- Field size: 105 x 68 m

Construction
- Built: 1958
- Opened: June 7, 1958
- Renovated: 2004

Tenant
- Atlético Grau

Estadio Miguel Grau is a multi-use stadium in Piura, Peru, built in 1958. It is currently used by football team Atlético Grau. Throughout the years the stadium has undergone many renovations, most recently for the Copa America 2004. For this international competition, the stadium capacity was raised to 25,500. It was also used to host several games in the 2005 FIFA U-17 World Championship, in which artificial turf and a new electronic scoreboard were installed.

== History ==
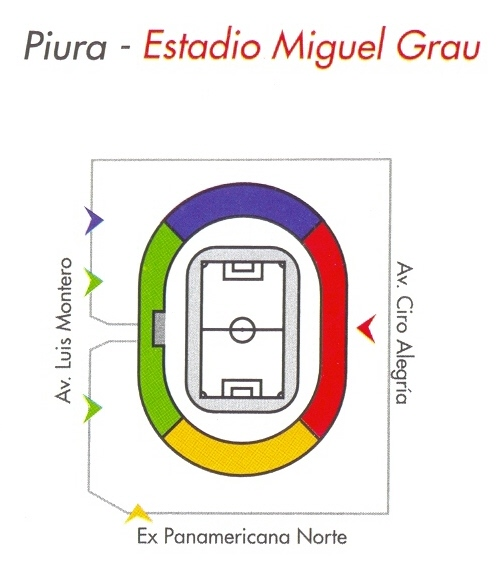

Construction of the stadium first began in 1956 to better promote sport in Piura. The stadium inauguration and completion was on 7 June 1958 with an initial capacity of 10,000. The first match held was between home team Atlético Grau and Club Indoamericano and later rivals Alianza Lima and Universitario, being the 100th game of the Peruvian Clásico.

In 2003, the stadium began a remodelization project with an investment of about $500 million in preparation for the 2004 Copa América. The project expanded the stadium to 25,000, new lighting, luxury boxes, dressing rooms, an artifitual turf, and an electronic scoreboard. The stadium hosted two Group Stage along with Estadio Elías Aguirre in Chiclayo.

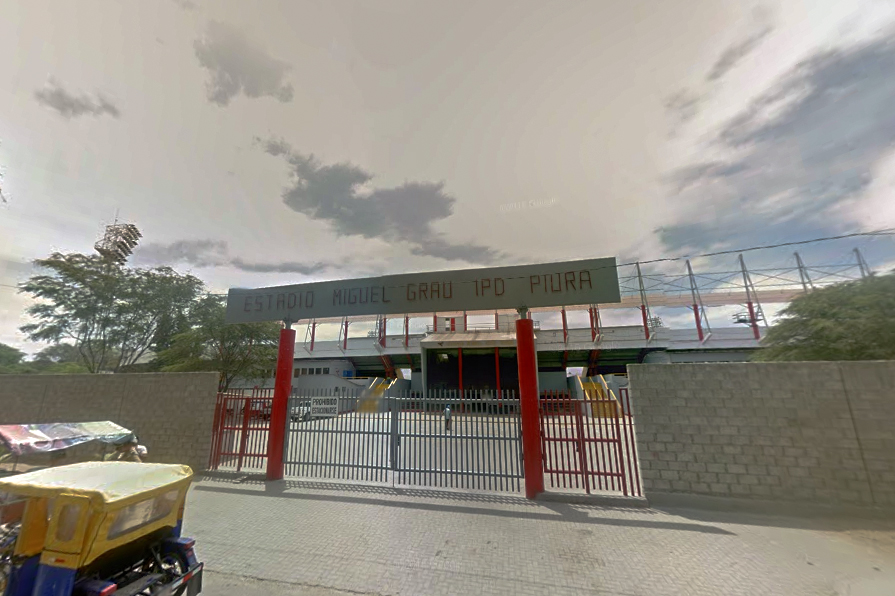
Entrance of the Estadio Miguel Grau.

In 2019, a second modernization project was underway for the 2021 FIFA U-17 World Cup but was canceled due to the COVID-19 pandemic. The project then came back once Peru was awarded hosting rights for the 2023 FIFA U-17 World Cup with a planned expansion to 26,000. Atletico Grau had to move to Estadio Municipal de Bernal until the remodelization was complete. Construction slowed down and Peru was stripped of hosting and the stadium was left abandoned. Multiple projects were announced to improve sporting infrastructure in the north of Peru, with Estadio Miguel Grau and others left abandoned and in a collapsing state, with their last matches being 5 years ago. None of these projects materialized.

In 2024, the Instituto Peruano del Deporte (IPD) announced that the stadium will be renovated. Construction will begin in April 2025, and will give the stadium a modern look, covered roof, along with renovating the surrounding sports buildings. However, controversy rose after the IPD decided to remove the running track, which will allow for a larger field but also a smaller capacity of 20,200. A new track will be built at the Colegio San Miguel.
