= Atlético Grau =

Association football club in Peru

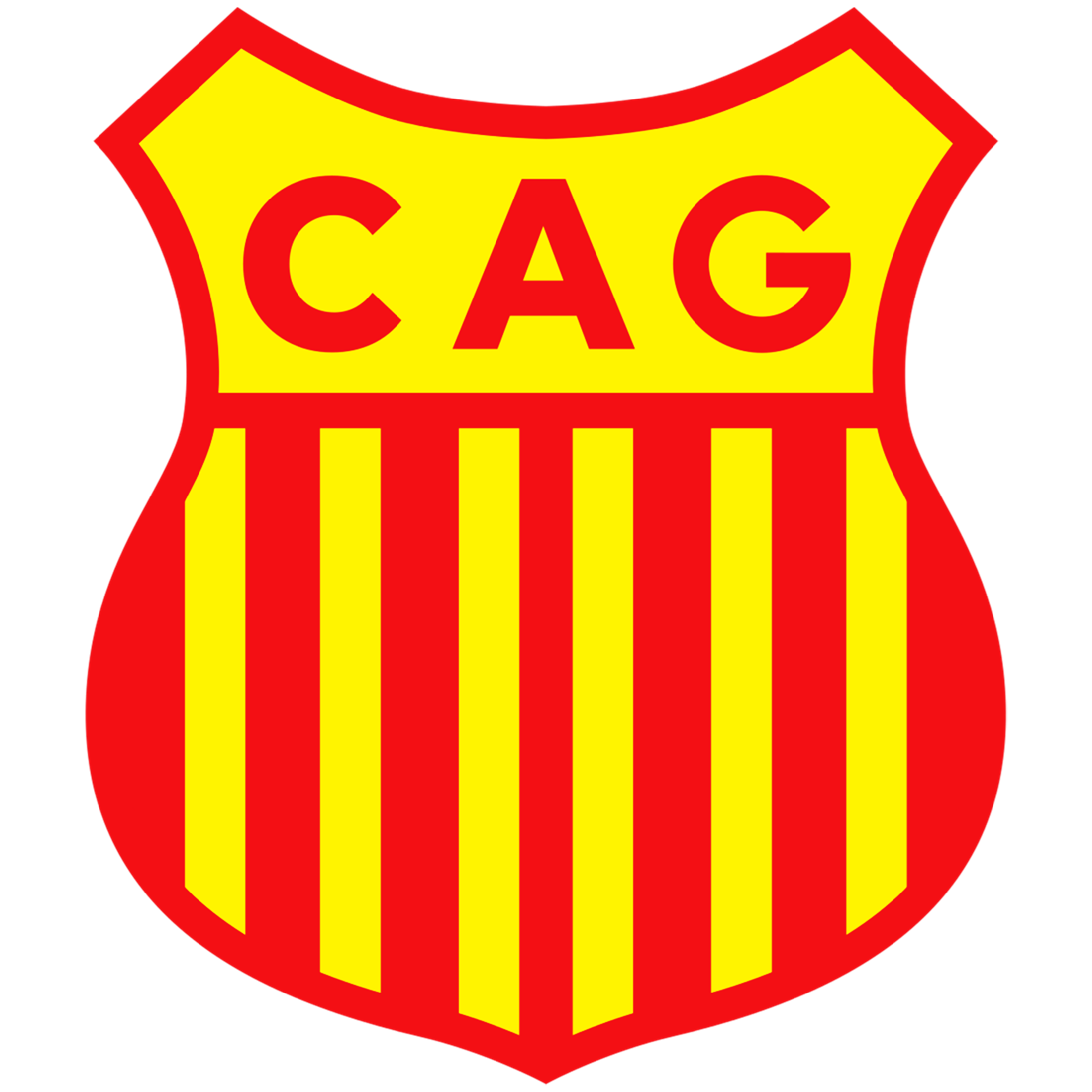
- Full name: Club Social Deportivo Atlético Grau
- Nicknames: Los Albos; Los Blancos; Los Heroicos; Los Académicos
- Founded: June 5, 1919; 107 years ago
- Ground: Estadio Miguel Grau
- Capacity: 25,500
- Chairman: Arturo Ríos Ibáñez
- Manager: Gerardo Ameli
- League: Liga 1
- 2025: Liga 1, 12th of 19
- Website: atleticograu.org
Home colours	Away colours

Club Atlético Grau, more commonly known as Atlético Grau or simply, Grau, is a Peruvian professional football club based in the city of Piura. The club was founded in 1919 and currently plays in the Peruvian Primera División, the top tier of Peruvian football. It is one of the most popular clubs in northern Peru and is the largest club in Piura. Atlético Grau has a long-standing rivalry with Alianza Atlético of Sullana, known as the Clásico Piurano.

Atlético Grau were Torneo Apertura champions of the 1969 Torneo Descentralizado and won the inaugural 2019 Copa Bicentenario and 2020 Supercopa Peruana. They also were champions of the 2021 Liga 2, being promoted to the Liga 1 where they currently still participate. Atlético Grau are the record holders of the Liga Departamental de Piura with 13 titles, along with 19 distrital, 5 Provincial, and 5 superior titles.

The club's home ground is Estadio Miguel Grau (Piura) which has a capacity of 25,500. However, the club currently plays at Estadio Municipal de Bernal as Estadio Miguel Grau is being renovated.

== History ==
=== Founding ===
The club was founded on June 5, 1919 as Club Miguel Grau by Guillermo Herrera on Calle Tacna in Piura; next to the home where Peruvian war hero Miguel Grau Seminario was born. The club was one of the founders of the first provincial league in the region, Liga Provincial de Fútbol de Piura in 1922 in which it played until 1965. One of its most important achievements was to contribute nine players to the gold-medal Peru national football team that competed at the 1961 Bolivarian Games football tournament.

=== Early First Division Spells ===
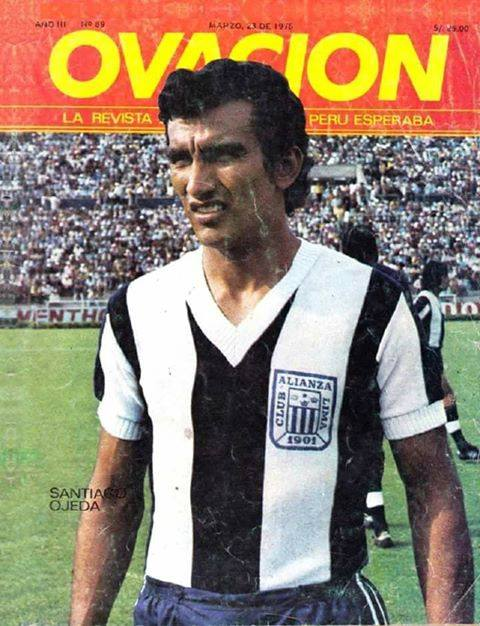
Santiago Ojeda, player of Atletico Grau from 1969 to 1970

In 1966, the Peruvian Football Federation decided to decentralize the national tournament by inviting and allowing teams from outside Lima and Callao to play in the tournament. The four invited teams were Melgar, Alfonso Ugarte de Chiclín, Octavio Espinosa, and Atlético Grau. The club's debut was against Alianza Lima who it defeated by 1–0. That year's coach was Ladislao Padosky. Out of the four invitees only Atlético Grau was saved from relegation that year. The team would remain in the highest flight of Peruvian football until 1970.

Atlético Grau was relegated to the Copa Perú that year which it would win in 1972 after defeating Deportivo Carsa, Cienciano, León de Huánuco, Deportivo Junín, and Cultural Juanjuí in La Finalísima, or Final Group Stage, and thus ascend to the Torneo Descentralizado once more alongside León de Huánuco. The 1972 squad was coached by Guillermo Quineche Gil and included Rolando Jiménez, Jorge Albán, Julio Miranda, Julio Ceballos, Manuel Mora, Javier Márquez, Manuel "Meleque" Suárez, Toribio Peña del Rosario, Marcos Murguía, José "Quimbo" Córdova and Reynaldo Rojas. This was Atlético Grau's only national title until the 2019 Copa Bicentenario. The team would remain in the first division for four years completing descent mid-table performances by finishing 7th in 1972, 11th in 1973, 15th in 1974, before being relegated in 1975 after finishing last in 18th place with only 22 points.

Atlético Grau reached the Final Group Stage a second time in 1982 where it finished 2nd behind its fellow Piura Region team Atlético Torino by a goal difference of 3. Atlético Grau returned for its third and longest first division spell in 1986 by invitation during the Regional Leagues era of Peruvian football that saw up to 40 teams compete in the highest division at its peak. The teams were divided into regional tournaments where the highest placed teams would qualify to the national stage which was played by 16 teams. The only two memorable campaigns would be its first in 1986 where the club reached the main national tournament and finished third in its group as well as the final campaign in 1991 where it ended up being relegated to the 1992 Torneo Zonal.

=== 21st Century Copa Perú Campaigns ===
Since then, Grau reached the National Stage of the Copa Perú multiple times during the 21st century. It reached the semi-finals, and quarter-finals in 2000 and 2001 respectively. It would reach the finals in 2002 for the first time during the bracket tournament format against Atlético Universidad from Arequipa with whom it tied 1–1 at home and lost 2–4 away. It would also reach the Round of 16 twice in 2010 and 2011 without being able to advance any further. In the 2011 Torneo Intermedio, the club was eliminated by Universidad César Vallejo in the Round of 16.

In 2004, Atlético Grau fused with 2000 Copa Perú champion Estudiantes de Medicina from Ica due to that club's financial instability. During the merge the club was known as Grau-Estudiantes and played with the colors of Atlético Grau. The new team was not recognize as valid by a majority of the club's voting members who fielded an alternative Atlético Grau team in the Copa Perú that same year. The merge only lasted for the first half of the 2004 Torneo Descentralizado season as the Peruvian Football Federation did not recognize the merge as legal. Curiously, Estudiantes de Medicina kept the same kit for the last half of the tournament after the merge was over and during which it was relegated.

Los Albos participated in the Liga Superior de Piura from its creation in 2009 until 2016 during which it was that league's champion four times. The Ligas Superiores were an effort by the Peruvian Football Federation to create a group of elite teams from every region of the country and thus elevate the quality of amateur football.

The 2017 Copa Perú campaign would see Grau become runner-up for the third time in the club's history. The team finished first in its group with 15 points during the first stage of the Departamental Stage. It then would go on to beat regional rivals such as Sport Ingeniero, Sport Chorrillos, Atlético Torino, and Asociación Torino to become the Departamental Champion and thus qualify once more for the National Stage for the first time under its current format. Atlético Grau then finished first out of fifty teams in the country in the league table with 16 points, 19 goals scored, and only 3 goals against. It would then beat Carlos Stein in the Round of 16 by a global score of 3–2. The toughest game of the season came in the quarter-finals against Club José María Arguedas to whom it lost 0–4 in the first leg only to beat it 4–0 with a goal in the final minutes of the game to advance to La Finalísima because of a better ranking in the League Table.

Once in the Final Group Stage it beat Estudiantil CNI by 2–0. Then it would tie 0–0 against the eventual champion Escuela Municipal Binacional. Thus for the third and final match Atlético Grau saw itself forced to win by as many goals as possible as to remain first on the table with a better goal difference. It won its last game against José Carlos Mariátegui 3-2, which was not enough as Escuela Municipal Binacional defeated Estudiantil CNI 2-0 and thus won the championship by a better goal difference. In the end Grau finished second and became the Peruvian club with the most runner-up campaigns in the history of the Copa Perú as well as winning a berth in the Peruvian Segunda División.

=== Second Division Spell ===
The 2018 season was Grau's first season in the second division of Peruvian soccer where it faced another six teams from the north of the country. Club leaders seemed hesitant to participate in the competition but later confirmed the club's participation. The team finished in 8th initially missing out of the Liguilla stage of the tournament which would decide the season championship. Just before the beginning of the Liguilla, Deportivo Hualgayoc was set aside by the tournament organizers for outstanding debts to its squad. Thus, Atlético Grau was invited to participate. It faced Carlos A. Mannucci in the quarter-final drawing 1-1 at home and losing 5-2 in Trujillo.

In 2019, Atlético Grau completed their best campaign to date in the Peruvian Segunda División (now called Liga 2). The club finished 4th, three points behind the champion, with an undefeated run at home. It qualified once again for the Liguilla that would decide the teams to participate in the 2019 Peruvian promotion play-offs. In the first round, Grau defeated Comerciantes Unidos by a score of 3-2 away and 0-3 at home. It then defeated the tournament's favorite Juan Aurich by 4-1 at home and 0-2 on the road for a total score of 4-3 and thus qualified to the promotion play-offs.

In the play-offs they faced Deportivo Coopsol, Chavelines Juniors, and Deportivo Llacuabamba. It defeated Deportivo Coopsol by 2-0 with goals from Ronal Huaccha and Steven Aponzá. It then obtained scoreless draws against its next two rivals. Their last game was controversial as a scoreless draw would qualify both Grau and their rival Deportivo Llacuabamba which could have been avoided if both matchday games had been played simultaneously. Regardless, Atlético Grau finished first in the play-offs and was promoted to the top tier of Peruvian football for the first time in 29 years.

=== 2019 Copa Bicentenario Championship ===
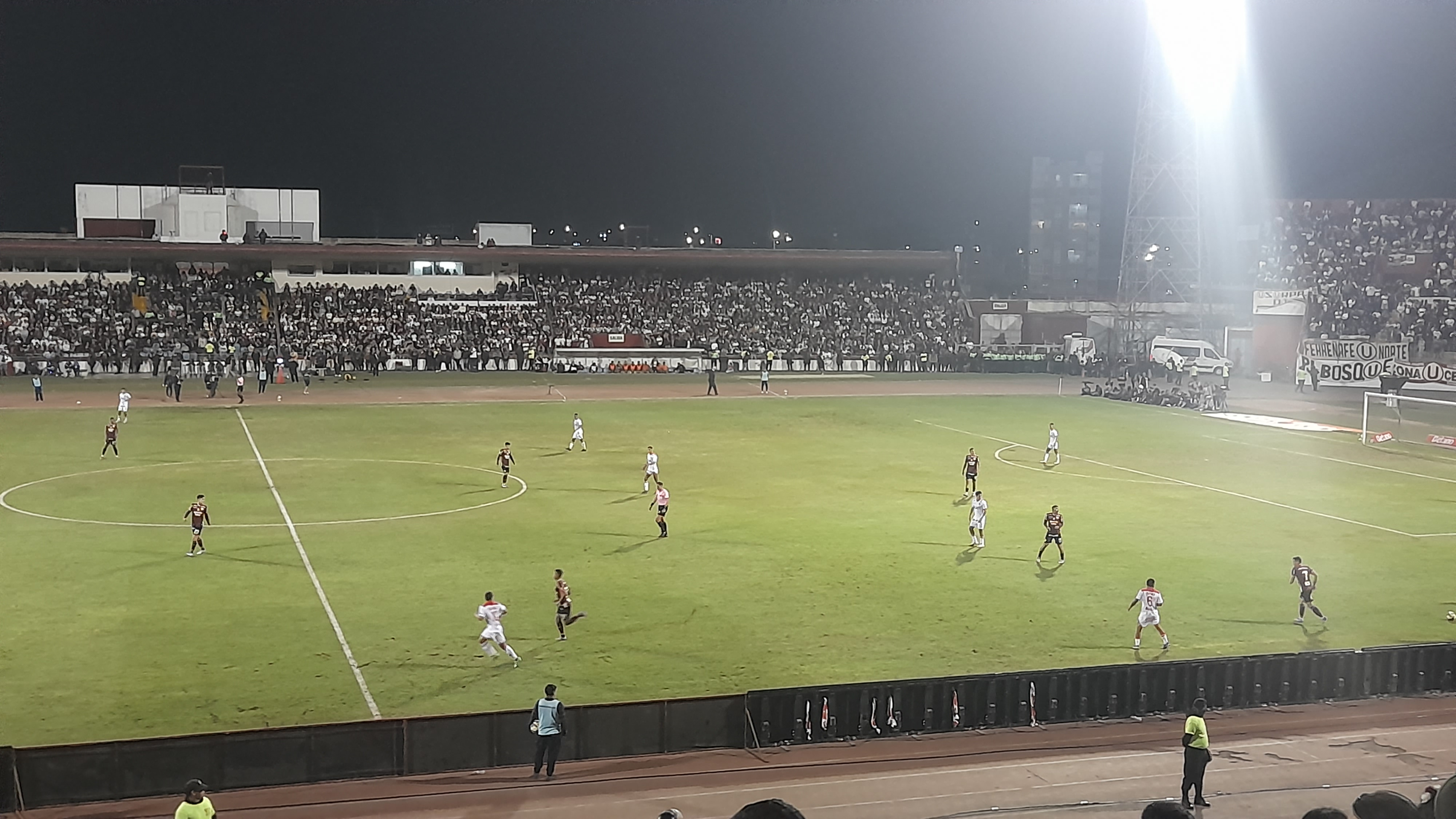
Atlético Grau vs Universitario in 2025

A new domestic cup competition was created in 2019 after the Peruvian Football Federation took control of the national domestic tournaments. All 30 professional teams from the first two divisions participated in the first edition of the Copa Bicentenario. Atlético Grau played in Group A with Sporting Cristal, Universidad César Vallejo, and Alianza Atlético. The club finished second behind Sporting Cristal with 4 points. In the round of 16 it defeated Universidad Técnica de Cajamarca in penalties by 7-6 after a 2-2 draw. In the quarterfinal it faced their former groupmate Sporting Cristal in penalties once again by 5-3 after 1-1 draw in regular time. In the semifinals it faced Deportivo Coopsol, guaranteeing the presence of at least one Liga 2 team in the final, whom it defeated by a combined score of 7-2 after two legs. In the final it faced Sport Huancayo at Estadio Miguel Grau in a scoreless draw after extra time. The championship was thus decided in penalties which Grau won by 4–3. This was Atlético Grau's first professional title and its second national title since the 1972 Copa Perú. The team also qualified for its first international tournament, the 2020 Copa Sudamericana, where it faced Uruguayan club Atlético River Plate.

As a result of winning the 2019 Copa Bicentenario, Atletico Grau classified for the 2020 Supercopa Peruana, playing against Liga 1 champions Deportivo Binacional. Atlético Grau defeated Binacional by three goals to zero.

== Stadium ==
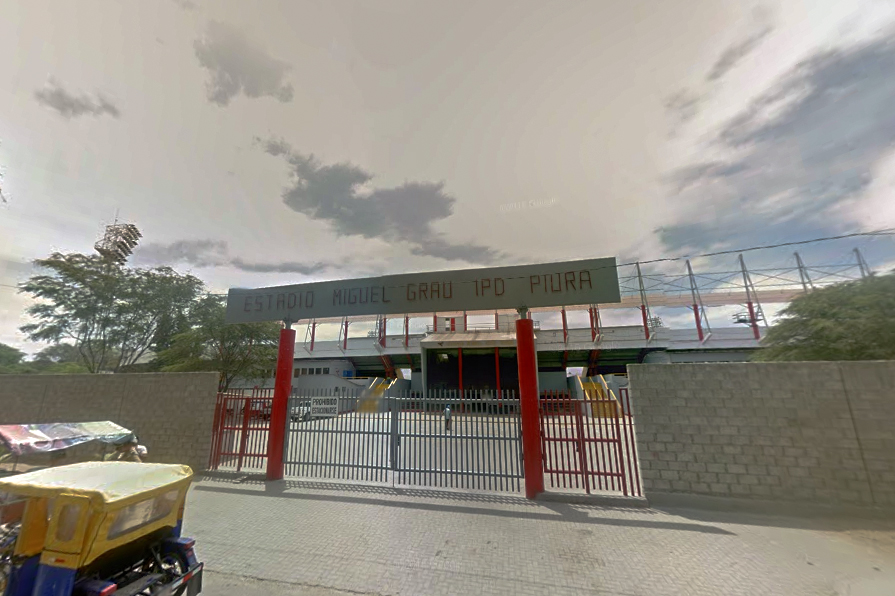
Estadio Miguel Grau

Atlético Grau's home ground is Estadio Miguel Grau Piura, which has a capacity of 25,500. The stadium was opened in 1958 and named after Peruvian war hero, Miguel Grau. Atlético Grau has played in Estadio Miguel Grau up until 2021, where they had to be relocated while the stadium was being renovated for the 2021 FIFA U-17 World Cup, which was to be held in Peru, but cancelled due to the COVID-19 pandemic and was set to host it again for the 2023 event. Peru was stripped of hosting rights in 2023 and renovations have stopped. The stadium was left abandoned, not hosting a single game since 2018 with multiple attempts to revive the stadium. In 2024, the Instituto Peruano del Deporte (IPD) agreed with the Piura Government to finally renovate the stadium and be up for use, where Atlético Grau is expected to play again. The club were then moved to Estadio Municipal de Bernal until the renovations are complete.

Atlético Grau has its own premises located on Luis Montero Avenue, Block V, Lot 7-8, in the Miraflores Urbanization in the city of Piura. In the outskirts of Piura, a new sports center complex is being constructed by the Peruvian Football Federation known as the Nueva VIDENA FPF Piura. It will have various training grounds for numerous sports along with a new stadium. It will be the new training ground and stadium to Atlético Grau.

== Supporters ==
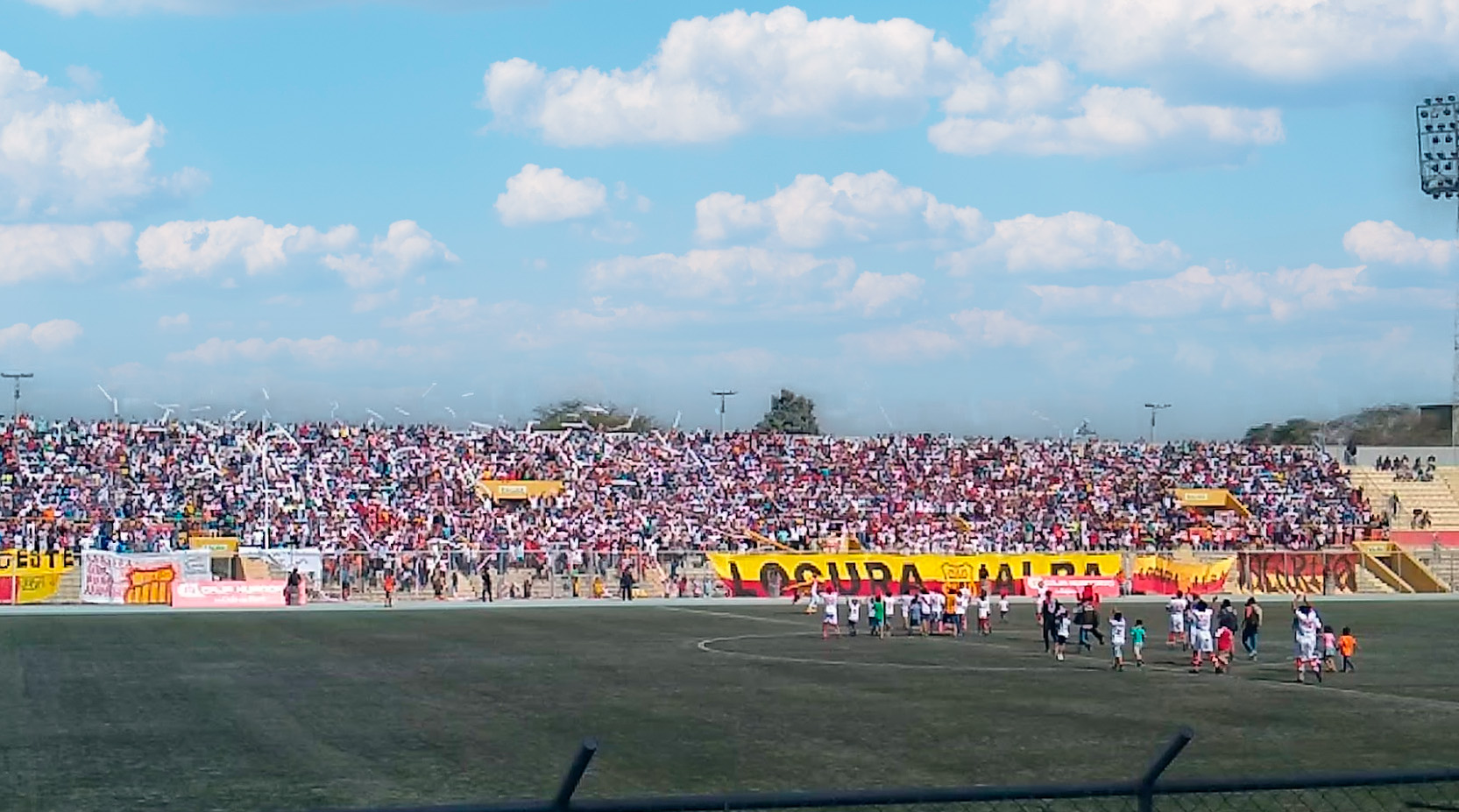
Atlético Grau fans at Estadio Miguel Grau.

Atlético Grau is considered one of the most popular teams in the north of Peru and is the most traditional and popular team for the Piura fans. The fan group Sentimiento Albo is from Piura . It was recognized by the Club and throughout Piura on February 13, 2003. When it plays, it gathers an average of 10,000 fans in its stadium, something that very few clubs do in Peru. The fan group is also credited as the soul of a team, as they cheer for victory.

== Rivalries ==
Atlético Grau maintains a fierce regional rivalry with the club Alianza Atlético, and Atlético Torino, which it plays the Clásico Piurano. Being the most traditional clubs in the Department of Piura, these classics were played regularly in the 70s and 80s. The three clubs are among the largest in the Piura Department. Atlético Grau and Alianza Atlético both participate in the Peruvian Primera División, while Atlético Torino plays in the Copa Perú.

== Current squad ==
As of 24 September 2026

Note: Flags indicate national team as defined under FIFA eligibility rules; some limited exceptions apply. Players may hold more than one non-FIFA nationality.

No.	Pos.	Nation	Player
1	GK	PER	Patricio Álvarez (captain)
2	DF	ARG	Lucas Acevedo
3	DF	CHI	Ignacio Tapia
4	DF	PER	Diego Rodríguez (on loan from Melgar)
5	MF	PER	Rafael Guarderas
6	MF	PER	Elsar Rodas
7	MF	PAR	Diego Barreto
8	DF	PER	Christian Vásquez
9	FW	PER	Raúl Ruidíaz
10	MF	PER	Paulo de la Cruz
11	FW	ARG	Nicolás Delgadillo
12	GK	PER	Aarom Fuentes
13	MF	PER	Freddy Oncoy
15	MF	URU	Pablo Lavandeira

No.	Pos.	Nation	Player
16	DF	PER	José Ataupillco
17	FW	PER	Henri Espinoza
20	MF	PER	Aldair Vásquez (on loan from Sporting Cristal)
21	MF	PER	Eslyn Correa
23	GK	PER	Breyner Vilela
24	FW	PER	Yamir Ruidíaz
25	DF	PER	Gabriel Alfaro
26	DF	PER	Arnold Flores
27	DF	ARG	Rodrigo Tapia
33	GK	PER	Aamet Calderón (on loan from Universitario de Deportes)
66	MF	PER	Adrián de la Cruz
77	FW	URU	Mauro Da Luz
96	MF	PER	Luis Benítes
99	FW	PAR	Adrián Fernández

== Honours ==
=== Senior titles ===
Keys

- Record
- ^{(s)} Shared record

Type	Competition	Titles	Runner-up	Winning years	Runner-up years
National (League)	Liga 2	1	1	2021	2019
National (League)	Cuadrangular de Ascenso	1^{(s)}	—	2019	—
National (League)	Intermedia (1984–1987)	1	1	1985 Zona Norte	1987 Zona Norte
National (League)	Copa Perú	1	3	1972	1982, 2002, 2017
Half-year / Short; Tournament (League)	Torneo Apertura	1	—	1969	—
Half-year / Short; Tournament (League)	Torneo Zona Norte	—	1	—	1991–II
Half-year / Short; Tournament (League)	Torneo Apertura (Liga 2)	—	1	—	2021
National (Cups)	Copa Bicentenario	1^{(s)}	—	2019	—
National (Cups)	Supercopa Peruana	1	—	2020	—
Regional (League)	Región I	3	3	2000, 2001, 2002	2003, 2010, 2011
Regional (League)	Región Norte A	1	—	1972	—
Regional (League)	Liga Departamental de Piura	13	3	1971, 1980, 1981, 1984, 1997, 2000, 2001, 2002, 2003, 2009, 2010, 2016, 2017	1979, 2013, 2014
Regional (League)	Liga Superior de Piura	5	—	2009, 2010, 2013, 2014, 2016	—
Regional (League)	Liga Provincial de Piura	5	2	1979, 2002, 2003, 2007, 2008	2005, 2017
Regional (League)	Liga Distrital de Piura	19	1	1927, 1928, 1930, 1933, 1935, 1944, 1960, 1962, 1963, 1965, 1971, 1979, 1980, 1984, 1997, 2000, 2007, 2008, 2017	2005

== Performance in CONMEBOL competitions ==
- Copa Sudamericana: 2 appearances

2020: First Stage
2025: Group Stage

== See also ==
- List of football clubs in Peru
- Peruvian football league system
