= Estadio Francisco Mendoza Pizarro =

- Interactive map of Estadio Francisco Mendoza Pizarro
- Full name: Estadio Monumental de Olmos Francisco Mendoza Pizarro
- Location: Olmos, Lambayeque, Peru
- Coordinates: 5°59′20.34″S 79°45′9.78″W
- Owner: Municipalidad Distrital de Olmos
- Capacity: 5,000
- Surface: Grass

Construction
- Opened: July 8, 2012

Tenants
- Los Caimanes; Pirata F.C.

Estadio Francisco Mendoza Pizarro is a football stadium in Olmos, Lambayeque. It has a natural grass field and three stand that hold 5,000 people. It was opened on July 8, 2012, with a game between Los Caimanes and Atlético Minero which the first won by 1–0. Juan Aurich from Chiclayo and Los Caimanes from Etén Puerto use it as their alternate fields.
