= Estadio Municipal de Bernal =

Coordinates: 5°26′54″S 80°40′25″W

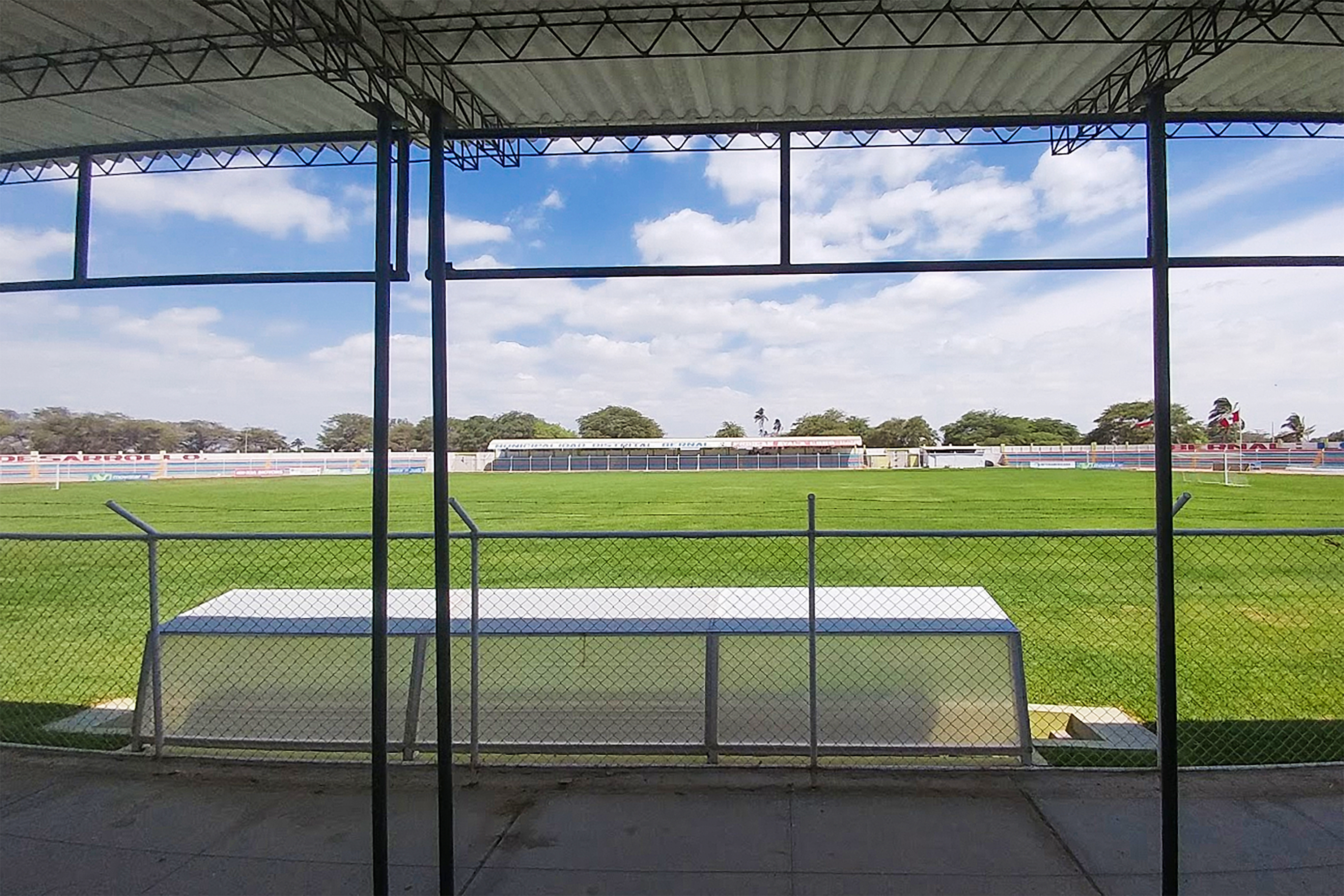
- Location: Bernal, Peru
- Operator: Municipalidad Distrital de Bernal
- Capacity: 7,000
- Surface: Grass

Estadio Municipal de Bernal is a multi-use stadium located in Bernal, Piura, Peru. The stadium can seat 7,000 spectators. The stadium is currently being used by Atlético Grau of the Peruvian Primera División, as their home stadium Estadio Miguel Grau in Piura is being remodeled for the 2023 FIFA U-17 World Cup that was set to be hosted by Peru.

Defensor La Bocana used to play in the stadium in 2016.
