= Christian Vásquez (footballer) =

Peruvian footballer (born 1999)

Personal information
- Full name: Christian James Vásquez Pérez
- Date of birth: 15 October 1999 (age 27)
- Place of birth: Socota, Peru
- Height: 1.77 m (5 ft 10 in)
- Position: Right-back

Team information
- Current team: Atlético Grau

Youth career
- Canteras Perú
- 2017–2019: Melgar

Senior career*
Years	Team	Apps	(Gls)
2018–2019	Melgar	8	(0)
2020–2022	UTC	34	(0)
2023	Sport Boys	30	(1)
2024–	Alianza Atlético	61	(1)
- * Club domestic league appearances and goals as of 30 December 2025

Christian James Vásquez Pérez (born 15 October 1999) is a Peruvian footballer who plays as a right-back for Peruvian Primera División side Atletico Grau.

== Career ==
=== Melgar ===
Vásquez joined FBC Melgar from Canteras Perú in Lima in 2017. In his first season in Melgar, Vásquez played for the clubs reserve team.

18-year old Vásquez got his official debut for Melgar in a Peruvian Primera División game against Real Garcilaso on 8 April 2018. Shortly after his debut, Vásquez was also summoned to the Peruvian U-20 national team. After four games for the first team in the 2018 season, Vásquez signed a new contract with Melgar on 10 October 2018 until the end of 2020. In 2019 season, Vásquez only managed to play one game for the first team.

=== UTC Cajamarca ===
In the search of more playing time, Vásquez joined UTC Cajamarca in January 2020. In his first season, he made a total of seven appearances. In December 2021, after making 12 appearances during the season, he renewed his contract until the end of 2022.

=== Sport Boys ===
In January 2023, Vásquez joined Sport Boys.

=== Alianza Atlético ===
A year later, ahead of the 2024 season, Vásquez signed for Alianza Atlético.
