= Bernal District =

Coordinates: 5.4629°S 80.7424°W

Bernal
- District
- Interactive map of Bernal
- Country: Peru
- Region: Piura
- Province: Sechura
- Founded: September 20, 1921
- Capital: Bernal, Peru

Government
  - Mayor: José Felix Ayala Cherre

Area
  - Total: 67.64 km^{2} (26.12 sq mi)
- Elevation: 16 m (52 ft)

Population (2005 census)
  - Total: 5,798
  - Density: 85.72/km^{2} (222.0/sq mi)
- Time zone: UTC-5 (PET)
- UBIGEO: 200803

Bernal District is one of six districts of the province of Sechura in Peru.

== Climate ==
Climate data for Bernal, elevation 11 m (36 ft), (1991–2020)
Month	Jan	Feb	Mar	Apr	May	Jun	Jul	Aug	Sep	Oct	Nov	Dec	Year
Mean daily maximum °C (°F)	33.2 (91.8)	33.9 (93.0)	33.6 (92.5)	32.4 (90.3)	30.1 (86.2)	28.1 (82.6)	27.3 (81.1)	27.4 (81.3)	28.2 (82.8)	28.6 (83.5)	29.4 (84.9)	31.2 (88.2)	30.3 (86.5)
Mean daily minimum °C (°F)	22.0 (71.6)	22.9 (73.2)	22.6 (72.7)	21.0 (69.8)	19.7 (67.5)	18.4 (65.1)	17.4 (63.3)	17.1 (62.8)	17.1 (62.8)	17.3 (63.1)	17.9 (64.2)	19.6 (67.3)	19.4 (67.0)
Average precipitation mm (inches)	18.5 (0.73)	25.6 (1.01)	38.1 (1.50)	7.3 (0.29)	0.6 (0.02)	0.2 (0.01)	0.3 (0.01)	0.1 (0.00)	0.1 (0.00)	0.3 (0.01)	0.9 (0.04)	2.8 (0.11)	94.8 (3.73)
Source: National Meteorology and Hydrology Service of Peru
