= Estadio Municipal de Nasca =

Football stadium in Nazca, Peru

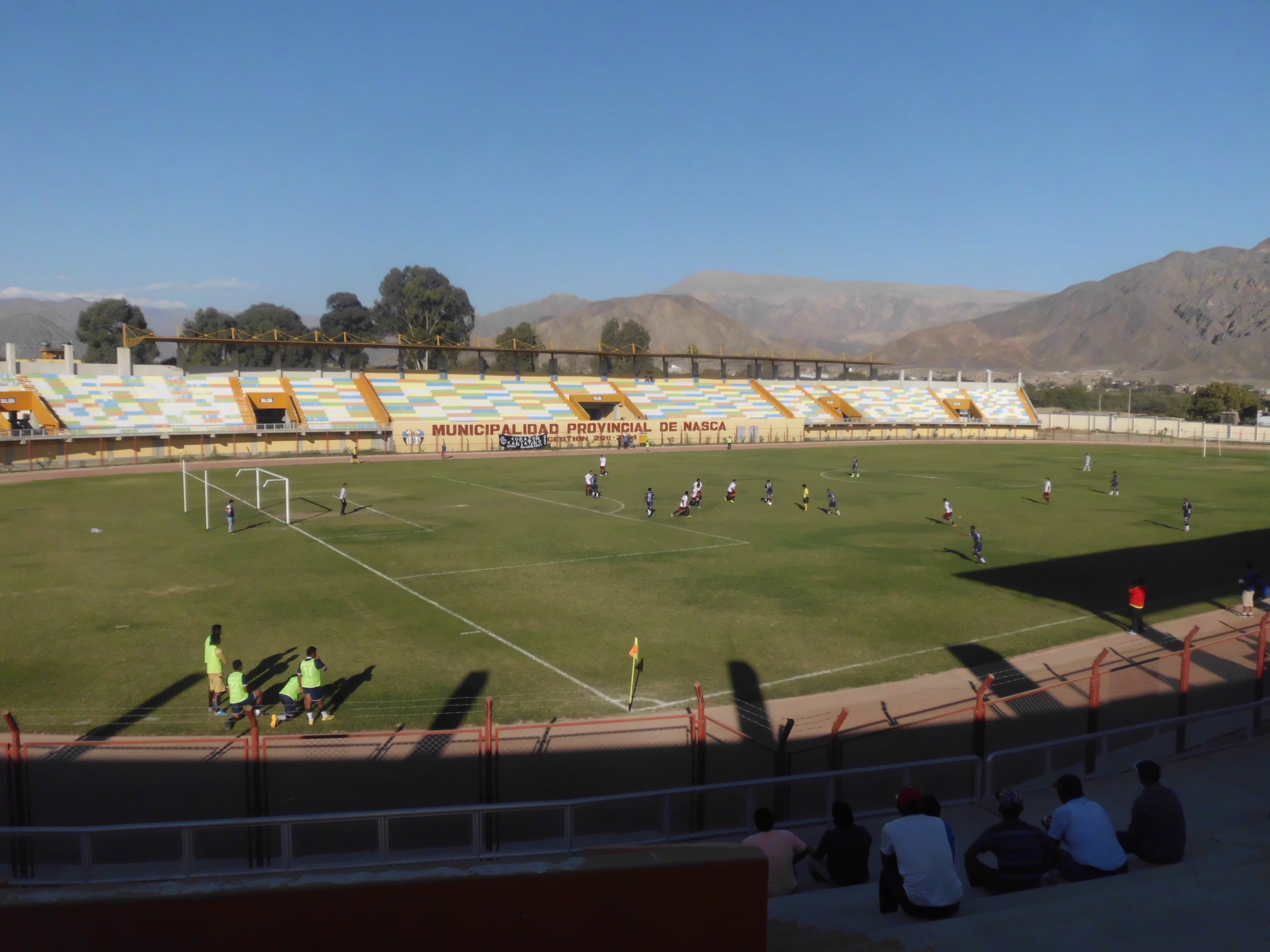
- Interactive map of Estadio Municipal de Nasca
- Former names: Estadio Pedro Huamán Román
- Location: Nazca, Peru
- Coordinates: 14°49′54″S 74°56′03″W
- Capacity: 10,000

Construction
- Opened: 1996
- Renovated: 2021

Tenants
- Santos de Nasca

Estadio Municipal de Nasca, previously known as Estadio Pedro Huaman Roman, is a football stadium in Nazca, Peru. The stadium is home to Peruvian Second Division club, Santos de Nasca. The stadium was renovated in 2021 and has a capacity of 10,000.
