= Estadio Municipal de la Juventud =

Football stadium in Peru

Coordinates: 6.6367°S 79.3931°W

- Interactive map of Estadio Municipal de la Juventud
- Full name: Estadio Municipal de la Juventud
- Location: Chongoyape, Peru
- Capacity: 2,000
- Surface: Grass

Estadio Municipal de la Juventud is a football stadium located in Chongoyape District of the Department of Lambayeque, Peru. The stadium has a capacity of 2,000 seats.
