= Jeremías Bogado =

Paraguayan footballer (born 1995)

Personal information
- Full name: Juan Jeremías Bogado Britos
- Date of birth: 4 July 1995 (age 31)
- Place of birth: Limpio, Paraguay
- Height: 1.74 m (5 ft 9 in)
- Position: Left winger

Team information
- Current team: Deportivo Municipal
- Number: 10

Youth career
- 2012–2014: Olimpia

Senior career*
Years	Team	Apps	(Gls)
2014–2017	Olimpia	27	(1)
2015	→ Deportivo Capiatá (loan)	11	(1)
2016	→ Pachuca (loan)	0	(0)
2016	→ General Caballero	9	(1)
2017–2018	Comerciantes Unidos	75	(19)
2019–	Deportivo Municipal	46	(11)

International career
2015	Paraguay U20	6	(0)
- * Club domestic league appearances and goals as of 30 November 2020

Juan Jeremías Bogado Britos (born 4 July 1995) is a Paraguayan footballer who plays for Deportivo Municipal.

== International career ==
he was summoned for Paraguay national under-20 football team to play 2015 South American Youth Football Championship.

== Honours ==
Pachuca

- Liga MX: Clausura 2016
