= Etén Puerto District =

Coordinates: 6.9278°S 79.8667°W

Etén Puerto
- District
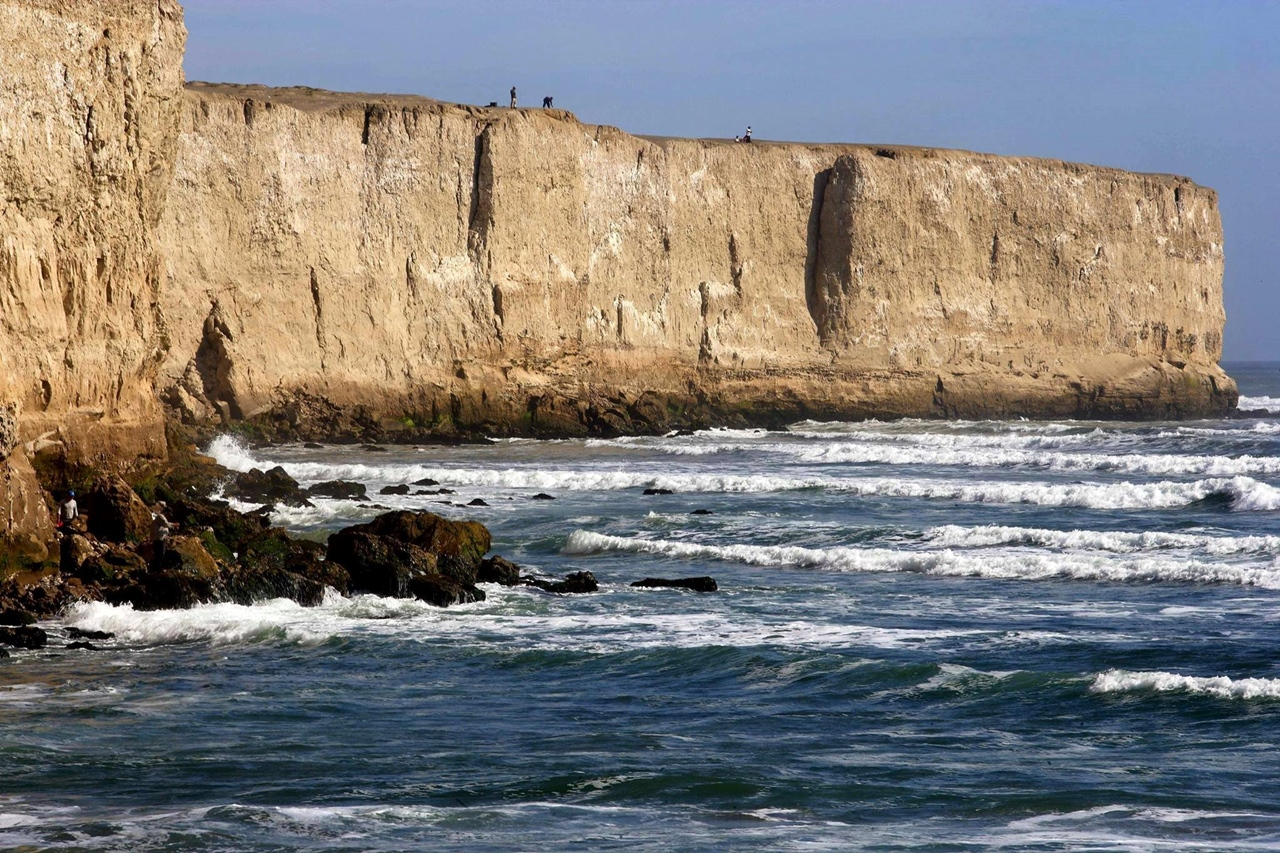

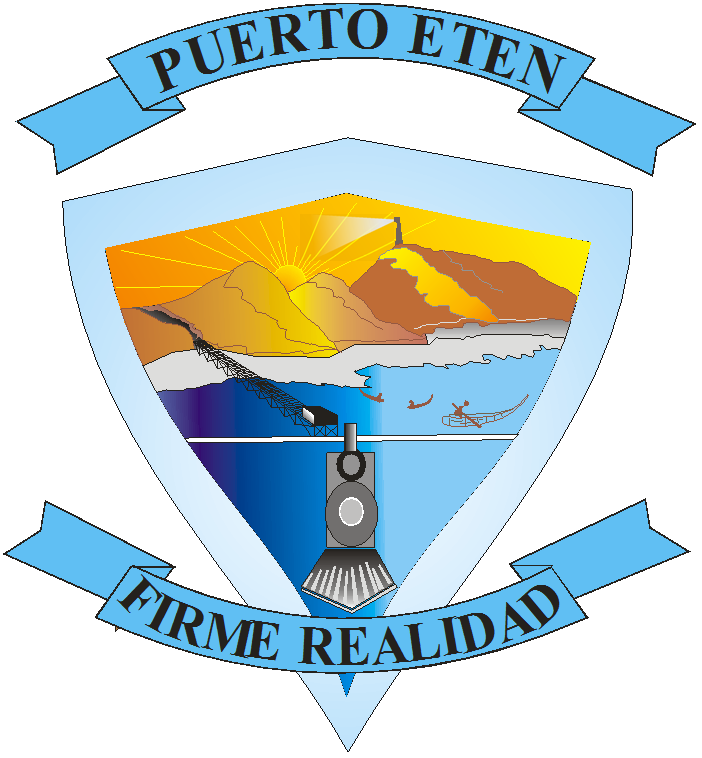
- Coat of arms
- Interactive map of Etén Puerto
- Country: Peru
- Region: Lambayeque
- Province: Chiclayo
- Founded: December 19, 1906
- Capital: Etén Puerto

Government
  - Mayor: Luis Enrique Baca Castañeda

Area
  - Total: 14.48 km^{2} (5.59 sq mi)
- Elevation: 5 m (16 ft)

Population (2017)
  - Total: 2,342
  - Density: 161.7/km^{2} (418.9/sq mi)
- Time zone: UTC-5 (PET)
- UBIGEO: 140104

Etén Puerto District is one of twenty districts of the province Chiclayo in Peru.
