= Santos de Nasca =

Santos
- Full name: Club Social Santos Fútbol Club
- Nicknames: La máquina azul El Peixe de Nasca
- Founded: May 30, 1976; 49 years ago
- Ground: Municipal de Nasca, Nazca, Peru
- Capacity: 10,000
- Chairman: Daerlly Erazo
- Coach: Guillermo Salas
- League: Liga 2
- 2023: Liga 2, 5th
Home colours	Away colours	Third colours

Club Social Santos F. C., more popularly known as Santos, is a Peruvian football club based in Nazca, Peru. It was founded in 1976 and since 2019, plays in Peruvian Segunda División.

== History ==
Santos FC was founded on May 30, 1976 in the District of Vista Alegre and joined Vista Alegre's District Soccer League.

Santos won the 2012 Liga Departamental de Ica for the first time and qualified for the 2012 Copa Perú. They got eliminated in the Region 6 stage, placing fourth in their group.

They once again won the 2018 Liga Departamental de Ica and qualified for the 2018 Copa Perú. Santos would qualify for the Second Round and the Final Group stage, after defeating Club Venus in the quarter-finals. They placed third in the Group Stage and qualified for the promotion play-off. Despite placing last in the promotion group, Santos qualified for the Peruvian Segunda División for the first time, where they still stand.

== Stadium ==
Santos' home stadium is Estadio Municipal de Nasca, located in the Nazca. It has a capacity of 10,000 spectators.

== Current squad ==
As of 30 March 2025

Note: Flags indicate national team as defined under FIFA eligibility rules; some limited exceptions apply. Players may hold more than one non-FIFA nationality.

No.	Pos.	Nation	Player
1	GK	PER	Carlos Román
2	DF	PER	José Canova
4	DF	ECU	Merlyn Estacio
5	DF	PER	Brian Bernaola
6	MF	PER	Stefano Velasco
7	FW	BOL	Jimmy Isita
8	MF	COL	Julián Muñoz
9	FW	PER	Miguel Curiel
10	FW	PER	Jean Deza
11	MF	PER	Chase Villanueva
12	GK	PER	Rogger Rosales
13	MF	PER	Sebastián Collazos

No.	Pos.	Nation	Player
16	FW	PER	Sair Moreyra
17	GK	PER	Matías Córdova
18	DF	PER	Anderson Condeña
20	FW	PER	Alberto Vela
23	MF	PER	Jesús Barco (Captain)
24	DF	PER	Ronaldo Andía
25	DF	PER	Piero Toledo
27	DF	PER	Orlando Cúneo
28	DF	PER	Cristhian Garcia
29	FW	PER	Geremi Cavero
32	MF	ARG	Jonathan Farías

== Honours ==
=== Senior titles ===
Keys

- Record
- ^{(s)} Shared record

Type	Competition	Titles	Runner-up	Winning years	Runner-up years
Regional (League)	Liga Departamental de Ica	2	—	2012, 2018	—
Regional (League)	Liga Provincial de Nasca	1	1	2018	2012
Regional (League)	Liga Distrital de Vista Alegre	1	3	2014	2012, 2017, 2018
