= Estadio Miguel Grau (Callao) =

Multi-use stadium in Callao, Peru

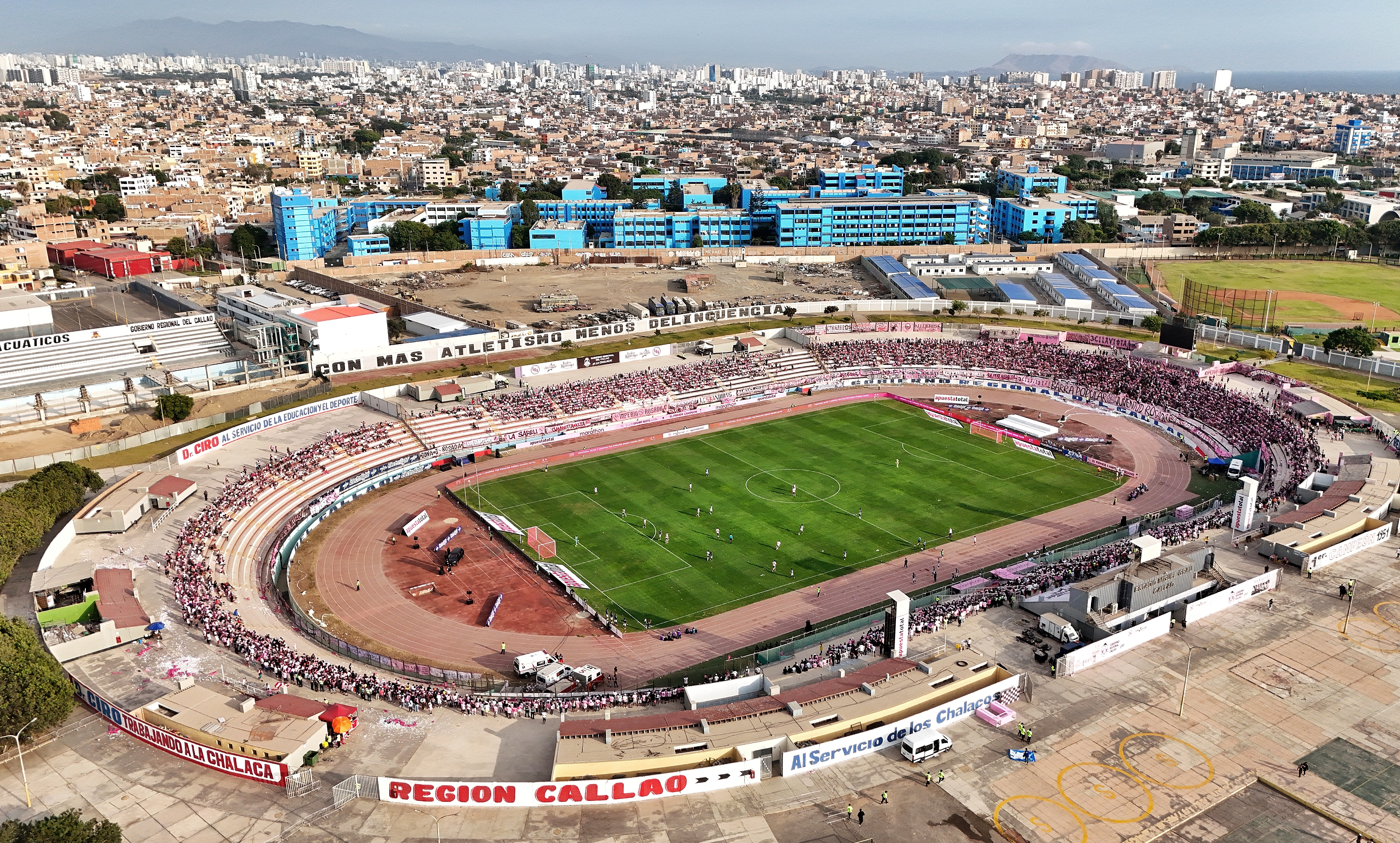
- Interactive map of Estadio Miguel Grau
- Location: Callao, Peru
- Coordinates: 12.05972°S 77.11995°W
- Owner: Regional Government of Callao
- Operator: Club Sport Boys Association
- Capacity: 17,000
- Surface: Grass
- Record attendance: 17,785 (August 15, 1999)

Construction
- Opened: May 16, 1996

Tenants
- Club Sport Boys Association (1996–present); Academia Deportiva Cantolao (1996–present); Club Deportivo Universidad de San Martín de Porres (2004–present)

Estadio Miguel Grau is a multi-use stadium in the Bellavista District of Callao, Peru. The stadium is part of the Sport Village of Callao (Villa Deportiva del Callao) or Yahuar Huaca, which is owned by the Callao Regional Government since 2011. Its use is available to several association football teams in the region, including the clubs Sport Boys Association, Universidad de San Martín and Academia Deportiva Cantolao who play their home matches here for the Torneo Descentralizado. The stadium's seating capacity is 17,000 people. Floodlight towers were installed in 2003

== History ==
The stadium was inaugurated on June 16, 1996 with a match between the Sport Boys and Deportivo Pesquero for the 1996 Torneo Descentralizado. The match was a 3–1 win for the Sport Boys.

The record attendance at the stadium occurred on August 15, 1999, when 17,785 people attended. In that match, Sport Boys defeated Alianza Lima 2–1 with goals from Germán Pinillos and Marquinho, discounting Claudio Pizarro for Alianza LIma.

In one of its latest refurbishments, four artificial light towers were placed, which allowed fans to appreciate night events inside the venue. These towers were inaugurated on March 8, 2003 in the match between Sport Boys and Sporting Cristal. The result was 3–2 in favor of the home team.

In January 2011, the administration of the Yáhuar Huaca stadium and complex passed from the Peruvian Institute of Sports to the Regional Government of Callao.

In April 2023, Sport Boys signed an agreement with the Regional Government of Callao with which it obtained the transfer of the administration of the stadium.
