= 2020 in Peruvian football =

Football in Peru
- Season: 2020

Men's football
- Liga 1: Sporting Cristal
- Liga 2: Alianza Atlético

The 2020 season in Peruvian football included all the matches of the different national male and female teams, as well as the local club tournaments, and the participation of these in international competitions in which representatives of the country's teams had participated.

== National teams ==
=== Peru national football team ===
==== Kits ====
Home	Away

==== 2022 FIFA World Cup qualification ====
8 October 2020	Paraguay	2–2	Peru	Estadio Defensores del Chaco, Asunción
19:30 UTC−3	Á. Romero 66', 81'	Report (FIFA); Report (CONMEBOL)	Carrillo 52', 85'	Attendance: 0 Referee: Néstor Pitana (Argentina)

13 October 2020	Peru	2–4	Brazil	Estadio Nacional, Lima
19:00 UTC−5	Carrillo 5'; Tapia 59'	Report (FIFA); Report (CONMEBOL)	Neymar 28' (pen.), 83' (pen.), 90+4'; Richarlison 64'	Attendance: 0 Referee: Julio Bascuñán (Chile)

13 November 2020	Chile	2–0	Peru	Estadio Nacional Julio Martínez Prádanos, Santiago
20:00 UTC−3	Vidal 19', 34'	Report (FIFA); Report (CONMEBOL)		Attendance: 0 Referee: Esteban Ostojich (Uruguay)

17 November 2020	Peru	0–2	Argentina	Estadio Nacional, Lima
19:30 UTC−5		Report (FIFA); Report (CONMEBOL)	González 17'; La. Martínez 28'	Attendance: 0 Referee: Wilmar Roldán (Colombia)

=== Peru national under-23 football team ===
==== 2020 CONMEBOL Pre-Olympic Tournament ====
19 January 2020	Brazil	1–0	Peru	Estadio Centenario, Armenia
20:30	Paulinho 43'	Report		Attendance: 3,058; Referee: Ángel Arteaga (Venezuela)

25 January 2020	Paraguay	2–3	Peru	Estadio Centenario, Armenia
20:30	Salcedo 15'; Díaz 16'	Report	Gonzales 53'; Carranza 71'; S. Arzamendia 74' (o.g.)	Attendance: 6,395; Referee: Darío Herrera (Argentina)

28 January 2020	Peru	0–1	Uruguay	Estadio Centenario, Armenia
18:00		Report	Ginella 11'	Attendance: 2,908; Referee: Ángel Arteaga (Venezuela)

31 January 2020	Bolivia	2–1	Peru	Estadio Centenario, Armenia
18:00	Villarroel 69'; Saldías 75' (pen.)	Report	Luján 90+6'	Attendance: 2,891; Referee: Nicolás Gallo (Colombia)

=== Peru women's national under-20 football team ===
==== 2020 South American Under-20 Women's Football Championship ====
Group B

Pos	Team	Pld	W	D	L	GF	GA	GD	Pts	Qualification
1	Brazil	4	4	0	0	14	0	+14	12	Final stage
2	Uruguay	4	3	0	1	13	10	+3	9	Final stage
3	Paraguay	4	2	0	2	6	7	−1	6	
4	Chile	4	0	1	3	2	6	−4	1	
5	Peru	4	0	1	3	0	12	−12	1	

Source: CONMEBOL
Rules for classification: Group stage tiebreakers

5 March 2020	Brazil	3–0	Peru	Estadio Provincial Juan Gilberto Funes, La Punta
21:15	Nycole 29'; Jaqueline 34' (pen.), 49'	Report		Referee: Adriana Farfán (Bolivia)

9 March 2020	Chile	0–0	Peru	Estadio Provincial Juan Gilberto Funes, La Punta
21:15		Report		Referee: María Herrán (Venezuela)

12 March 2020	Peru	0–3	Paraguay	Estadio Provincial Juan Gilberto Funes, La Punta
19:00		Report	Barreto 49'; Sánchez 73'; Melgarejo 87'	Referee: Viviana Muñoz (Colombia)

14 March 2020	Uruguay	6–0	Peru	Estadio Provincial Juan Gilberto Funes, La Punta
19:00	Bermúdez 11', 43'; Pizarro 17', 53', 55'; Carballo 90+2'			Referee: Susana Corella (Ecuador)

== CONMEBOL competitions ==
=== CONMEBOL Copa Libertadores ===
==== First stage ====
21 January 2020
18:15 UTC−4

Carabobo (Venezuela)	1–1	(Peru) Universitario
Tortolero 46'	Report	Dos Santos 83'

Polideportivo Cachamay, Ciudad Guayana
Referee: Alexander Ospina (Colombia)
28 January 2020
19:30 UTC−5

Universitario (Peru)	1–0	(Venezuela) Carabobo
Alonso 24'	Report

Estadio Monumental, Lima
Referee: Bráulio Machado (Brazil)

==== Second stage ====
5 February 2020
17:15 UTC−5

Universitario (Peru)	1–1	(Paraguay) Cerro Porteño
Dos Santos 52'	Report	Ruiz 65'

Estadio Monumental, Lima
Referee: Andrés Rojas (Colombia)
12 February 2020
19:15 UTC−3

Cerro Porteño (Paraguay)	1–0	(Peru) Universitario
Carrizo 61'	Report

Estadio General Pablo Rojas, Asunción
Referee: Patricio Loustau (Argentina)

6 February 2020
19:30 UTC−5

Barcelona (Ecuador)	4–0	(Peru) Sporting Cristal
F. Martínez 6', 50'; Marques 13'; Álvez 82' (pen.)	Report

Estadio Monumental Isidro Romero Carbo, Guayaquil
Referee: Cristian Garay (Chile)
13 February 2020
19:30 UTC−5

Sporting Cristal (Peru)	2–1	(Ecuador) Barcelona
Sandoval 80'; Olivares 90+3' (pen.)	Report	F. Martínez 68'

Estadio Nacional, Lima
Referee: Wilton Sampaio (Brazil)

==== Group stage ====
===== Group D =====
Pos	Team	Pld	W	D	L	GF	GA	GD	Pts	Qualification	RIV	LDQ	SPA	BIN
1	(Argentina) River Plate	6	4	1	1	21	6	+15	13	Round of 16	—	3–0	2–1	8–0
2	(Ecuador) LDU Quito	6	4	0	2	12	8	+4	12	Round of 16	3–0	—	4–2	4–0
3	(Brazil) São Paulo	6	2	1	3	14	11	+3	7	Copa Sudamericana	2–2	3–0	—	5–1
4	(Peru) Binacional	6	1	0	5	3	25	−22	3		0–6	0–1	2–1	—

Source: CONMEBOL
5 March 2020
19:00 UTC−5

Binacional (Peru)	2–1	(Brazil) São Paulo
Rodríguez 50'; Arango 77'	Report	Pato 20'

Estadio Guillermo Briceño Rosamedina, Juliaca
Referee: José Méndez (Paraguay)
11 March 2020
19:15 UTC−3

River Plate (Argentina)	8–0	(Peru) Binacional
Casco 38'; Borré 55'; Carrascal 58'; Fernández 74', 90+2'; Rojas 79'; Díaz 80'; Suárez 88'	Report

Estadio Monumental Antonio Vespucio Liberti, Buenos Aires
Referee: Jesús Valenzuela (Venezuela)
15 September 2020
19:30 UTC−5

Binacional (Peru)	0–1	(Ecuador) LDU Quito
	Report	Zunino 30'

Estadio Nacional, Lima
Attendance: 0
Referee: Ivo Méndez (Bolivia)
22 September 2020
19:30 UTC−5

Binacional (Peru)	0–6	(Argentina) River Plate
	Report	De La Cruz 15'; Suárez 25'; Álvarez 36'; Fernández 70'; Pratto 84', 90+2'

Estadio Nacional, Lima
Attendance: 0
Referee: Gery Vargas (Bolivia)
29 September 2020
19:30 UTC−5

LDU Quito (Ecuador)	4–0	(Peru) Binacional
Otoya 2' (o.g.); Mancilla 14' (o.g.); Muñoz 58', 81'	Report

Estadio Rodrigo Paz Delgado, Quito
Attendance: 0
Referee: Alexander Ospina (Colombia)

===== Group F =====
Pos	Team	Pld	W	D	L	GF	GA	GD	Pts	Qualification	NAC	RAC	ESM	ALI
1	(Uruguay) Nacional	6	5	0	1	9	3	+6	15	Round of 16	—	1–2	1–0	2–0
2	(Argentina) Racing	6	5	0	1	9	4	+5	15	Round of 16	0–1	—	2–1	1–0
3	(Venezuela) Estudiantes de Mérida	6	1	1	4	8	12	−4	4	Copa Sudamericana	1–3	1–2	—	3–2
4	(Peru) Alianza Lima	6	0	1	5	4	11	−7	1		0–1	0–2	2–2	—

Source: CONMEBOL
5 March 2020
21:00 UTC−5

Alianza Lima (Peru)	0–1	(Uruguay) Nacional
	Report	Rodríguez 1'

Estadio Alejandro Villanueva, Lima
Referee: Bruno Arleu (Brazil)
12 March 2020
21:00 UTC−3

Racing (Argentina)	1–0	(Peru) Alianza Lima
Reniero 56'	Report

El Cilindro, Avellaneda
Attendance: 0
Referee: José Méndez (Paraguay)
16 September 2020
18:15 UTC−4

Estudiantes de Mérida (Venezuela)	3–2	(Peru) Alianza Lima
E. Rivas 64'; Mena 81'; J. Rivas 90+7' (pen.)	Report	Gómez 51' (pen.); Arroe 54'

Estadio Metropolitano de Mérida, Mérida
Attendance: 0
Referee: Nicolás Gallo (Colombia)
23 September 2020
19:30 UTC−5

Alianza Lima (Peru)	0–2	(Argentina) Racing
	Report	Banega 87'; Garré 90'

Estadio Alejandro Villanueva, Lima
Attendance: 0
Referee: Ivo Méndez (Bolivia)
30 September 2020
19:30 UTC−5

Alianza Lima (Peru)	2–2	(Venezuela) Estudiantes de Mérida
Arroe 3'; Rubio 90+5'	Report	J. Rivas 35' (pen.), 67' (pen.)

Estadio Alejandro Villanueva, Lima
Attendance: 0
Referee: Gery Vargas (Bolivia)
21 October 2020
19:15 UTC−3

Nacional (Uruguay)	2–0	(Peru) Alianza Lima
Bergessio 8'; Trezza 31'	Report

Estadio Gran Parque Central, Montevideo
Attendance: 0
Referee: Juan Benítez (Paraguay)

=== CONMEBOL Copa Sudamericana ===
==== First stage ====
4 February 2020
18:15 UTC−4

Nacional Potosí (Bolivia)	0–2	(Peru) Melgar
	Report	Sánchez 5'; Arce 66'

Estadio Víctor Agustín Ugarte, Potosí
Referee: Gustavo Tejera (Uruguay)
18 February 2020
19:30 UTC−5

Melgar (Peru)	0–2	(Bolivia) Nacional Potosí
	Report	Royón 77', 86'
Penalties
Aubert (penalty scored); Tejeda (penalty scored); Ávila (penalty missed); Sánchez (penalty scored); Fuentes (penalty scored)	4–3	(penalty missed) R. Cabrera; (penalty scored) Pérez; (penalty missed) Fierro; (penalty scored) Bustamante; (penalty scored) A. Cabrera

Estadio Monumental de la UNSA, Arequipa
Referee: Luis Quiroz (Ecuador)

11 February 2020
17:15 UTC−5

Atlético Grau (Peru)	1–2	(Uruguay) River Plate
Ramírez 86'	Report	Olivera 16'; Neris 24'

Estadio Monumental, Lima
Referee: Piero Maza (Chile)
25 February 2020
19:15 UTC−3

River Plate (Uruguay)	1–0	(Peru) Atlético Grau
Olivera 15'	Report

Parque Alfredo Víctor Viera, Montevideo
Referee: José Méndez (Paraguay)

11 February 2020
19:15 UTC−3

Argentinos Juniors (Argentina)	1–1	(Peru) Sport Huancayo
Hauche 71'	Report	Lliuya 45'

Estadio Diego Armando Maradona, Buenos Aires
Referee: Ángel Arteaga (Venezuela)
25 February 2020
19:30 UTC−5

Sport Huancayo (Peru)	0–0	(Argentina) Argentinos Juniors
	Report

Estadio Huancayo, Huancayo
Referee: Daniel Fedorczuk (Uruguay)

13 February 2020
19:30 UTC−5

Cusco (Peru)	2–0	(Chile) Audax Italiano
Vílchez 73'; Devecchi 83' (o.g.)	Report

Estadio Monumental de la UNSA, Arequipa
Referee: Luis Quiroz (Ecuador)
27 February 2020
21:30 UTC−3

Audax Italiano (Chile)	3–0	(Peru) Cusco
Holgado 40', 45', 65'	Report

Estadio Nacional Julio Martínez Prádanos, Santiago
Referee: Augusto Aragón (Ecuador)

==== Second stage ====
27 October 2020
17:15 UTC−5

Sport Huancayo (Peru)	1–1	(Uruguay) Liverpool
Ángeles 60'	Report	Ramírez 54'

Estadio Nacional, Lima
Attendance: 0
Referee: Marlon Vera (Ecuador)
3 November 2020
19:15 UTC−3

Liverpool (Uruguay)	1–2	(Peru) Sport Huancayo
Ocampo 49'	Report	Morales 41'; Neumann 78'

Estadio Luis Franzini, Montevideo
Attendance: 0
Referee: Arnaldo Samaniego (Paraguay)

29 October 2020
19:30 UTC−5

Melgar (Peru)	1–0	(Brazil) Bahia
Nino Paraíba 80' (o.g.)	Report

Estadio Nacional, Lima
Attendance: 0
Referee: Carlos Betancur (Colombia)
5 November 2020
21:30 UTC−3

Bahia (Brazil)	4–0	(Peru) Melgar
Fessin 12', 34'; Gregore 20'; Gilberto 35'	Report

Itaipava Arena Fonte Nova, Salvador
Attendance: 0
Referee: Cristian Garay (Chile)

==== Round of 16 ====
25 November 2020
21:30 UTC−3

Coquimbo Unido (Chile)	0–0	(Peru) Sport Huancayo
	Report

Estadio Municipal Francisco Sánchez Rumoroso, Coquimbo
Attendance: 0
Referee: Gery Vargas (Bolivia)
2 December 2020
19:30 UTC−5

Sport Huancayo (Peru)	0–2	(Chile) Coquimbo Unido
	Report	Vallejos 1'; Palacios 81'

Estadio Nacional, Lima
Attendance: 0
Referee: Augusto Aragón (Ecuador)

=== U-20 Copa Libertadores ===
==== Group stage ====
Group A

Pos	Team	Pld	W	D	L	GF	GA	GD	Pts	Qualification
1	(Brazil) Flamengo	3	2	0	1	8	3	+5	6	Semi-finals
2	(Venezuela) Academia Puerto Cabello	3	2	0	1	7	6	+1	6	
3	(Uruguay) Nacional	3	1	0	2	5	6	−1	3	
4	(Peru) Sporting Cristal	3	1	0	2	6	11	−5	3	

Source: CONMEBOL
15 February 2020
20:15

Academia Puerto Cabello (Venezuela)	5–3	(Peru) Sporting Cristal
Arape 5', 59'; Hernández 23', 43', 89'	Report	Villalta 18'; Ruiz 21'; Romani 63'

Estadio General Adrián Jara, Luque
Referee: Bismarks Santiago (Colombia)
18 February 2020
20:15

Flamengo (Brazil)	5–1	(Peru) Sporting Cristal
Yuri César 40', 45+3'; Muniz 49' (pen.); Yuri 60'; João Gomes 85'	Report	Romani 36' (pen.)

Estadio General Adrián Jara, Luque
Referee: Felipe González (Chile)
21 February 2020
18:00

Sporting Cristal (Peru)	2–1	(Uruguay) Nacional
Romani 5' (pen.); Soto 22'	Report	A. Pérez 61'

Estadio Arsenio Erico, Asunción
Referee: Andrés Merlos (Argentina)

=== CONMEBOL Copa Libertadores Femenina ===
==== Group A ====
Pos	Team	Pld	W	D	L	GF	GA	GD	Pts	Qualification
1	(Brazil) Corinthians	3	3	0	0	27	0	+27	9	Quarter-finals
2	(Colombia) América	3	2	0	1	10	4	+6	6	Quarter-finals
3	(Peru) Universitario	3	0	1	2	1	14	−13	1	
4	(Ecuador) El Nacional	3	0	1	2	2	22	−20	1	

Source: CONMEBOL
5 March 2021
19:30

Universitario (Peru)	0–5	(Colombia) América
	Report	González 8', 33', 51'; Arias 15'; Guarecuco 75'

Estadio Nuevo Francisco Urbano, Morón
Referee: Adriana Farfán (Bolivia)
8 March 2021
17:00

Corinthians (Brazil)	8–0	(Peru) Universitario
Grazi 2', 38', 90+1'; Gabi Nunes 12', 57'; Giovanna Crivelari 42'; Andressinha 54'; Diany 87'	Report

Estadio Nuevo Francisco Urbano, Morón
Referee: Anahí Fernández (Uruguay)
11 March 2021
17:00

El Nacional (Ecuador)	1–1	(Peru) Universitario
Villa 73'	Report	Canales 90'

José Amalfitani Stadium, Buenos Aires
Referee: María Victoria Daza (Colombia)

== Liga 1 ==
=== Fase 1 ===
Pos	Team	Pld	W	D	L	GF	GA	GD	Pts
1	Universitario	19	13	4	2	38	18	+20	43
2	Sport Huancayo	19	10	5	4	23	15	+8	35
3	Sporting Cristal	19	9	6	4	38	23	+15	33
4	Universidad César Vallejo	19	8	9	2	25	16	+9	33
5	Carlos A. Mannucci	19	7	8	4	28	22	+6	29
6	UTC	19	7	8	4	24	20	+4	29
7	Alianza Universidad	19	8	5	6	21	17	+4	29
8	Melgar	19	7	7	5	23	20	+3	28
9	Ayacucho	19	7	6	6	28	21	+7	27
10	Cienciano	19	8	3	8	27	23	+4	27
11	Binacional	19	6	5	8	24	29	−5	23
12	Alianza Lima	19	5	7	7	19	20	−1	22
13	Cantolao	19	6	4	9	21	33	−12	22
14	Deportivo Municipal	19	4	9	6	20	24	−4	21
15	Cusco	19	5	6	8	26	31	−5	21
16	Universidad San Martín	19	5	6	8	20	27	−7	21
17	Sport Boys	19	5	5	9	24	33	−9	20
18	Carlos Stein	19	4	6	9	18	28	−10	18
19	Atlético Grau	19	3	8	8	17	27	−10	17
20	Deportivo Llacuabamba	19	2	5	12	25	42	−17	11

Source: ADFP, Soccerway
Rules for classification: 1) Points; 2) Goal difference; 3) Goals for; 4) Fair play points; 5) Drawing of lots; 6) Play-off (only if needed to decide first place).
If two teams are tied in points for first place: 2) Play-off.

==== Fase 2 ====
Group A

Pos	Team	Pld	W	D	L	GF	GA	GD	Pts	Qualification	CRI	USM	UTC	CIE	BIN	UNI	STE	CAG	AUH	CAN
1	Sporting Cristal	9	7	2	0	20	9	+11	23	Advance to Stage 2 final	—	—	—	—	—	2–2	1–0	—	2–0	3–2
2	Universidad San Martín	9	5	1	3	12	10	+2	16		0–2	—	1–1	1–2	0–2	—	—	—	—	—
3	UTC	9	3	5	1	18	9	+9	14		1–1	—	—	—	3–0	—	—	0–0	1–2	4–2
4	Cienciano	9	4	2	3	12	11	+1	14		2–3	—	1–1	—	1–1	—	—	1–0	2–0	—
5	Binacional	9	4	1	4	11	13	−2	13		1–2	—	—	—	—	0–2	—	1–3	2–1	1–0
6	Universitario	9	3	2	4	12	17	−5	11		—	2–3	1–6	0–1	—	—	0–2	2–1	—	—
7	Carlos Stein	9	3	1	5	12	16	−4	10		—	0–2	1–1	3–2	1–3	—	—	—	—	2–1
8	Atlético Grau	9	2	3	4	9	12	−3	9		1–4	0–2	—	—	—	—	3–1	—	1–1	—
9	Alianza Universidad	9	2	2	5	8	13	−5	8		—	0–1	—	—	—	0–1	3–2	—	—	1–1
10	Cantolao	9	1	3	5	11	15	−4	6		—	1–2	—	2–0	—	2–2	—	0–0	—	—

Source: ADFP, Soccerway
Legend: Blue = home team win; Yellow = draw; Red = away team win.
Rules for classification: 1) Points; 2) Goal difference; 3) Goals for; 4) Drawing of lots.

Group B

Pos	Team	Pld	W	D	L	GF	GA	GD	Pts	Qualification	AYA	UCV	CAM	CUS	MEL	SBA	LLA	MUN	SHU	ALI
1	Ayacucho	9	6	2	1	14	5	+9	20	Advance to Stage 2 final	—	1–1	1–0	3–1	2–0	—	—	—	—	—
2	Universidad César Vallejo	9	5	3	1	16	7	+9	18		—	—	—	—	—	3–1	2–0	0–1	—	4–1
3	Carlos A. Mannucci	9	5	1	3	13	7	+6	16		—	2–3	—	0–2	0–0	—	—	—	2–1	1–0
4	Cusco	9	4	3	2	13	10	+3	15		—	1–1	—	—	3–1	1–2	—	—	0–0	1–0
5	Melgar	9	4	1	4	18	14	+4	13		—	0–2	—	—	—	4–1	—	3–2	4–0	0–4
6	Sport Boys	9	4	0	5	10	18	−8	12		0–1	—	0–4	—	—	—	—	1–0	3–2	—
7	Deportivo Llacuabamba	9	3	1	5	16	21	−5	10		1–0	—	0–2	2–3	0–6	3–0	—	—	—	—
8	Deportivo Municipal	9	2	3	4	9	14	−5	9		1–1	—	0–2	1–1	—	—	2–5	—	0–0	—
9	Sport Huancayo	9	2	3	4	9	15	−6	9		0–3	0–0	—	—	—	—	4–3	—	—	2–0
10	Alianza Lima	9	1	1	7	9	16	−7	4		1–2	—	—	—	—	0–2	2–2	1–2	—	—

Source: ADFP, Soccerway
Legend: Blue = home team win; Yellow = draw; Red = away team win.
Rules for classification: 1) Points; 2) Goal difference; 3) Goals for; 4) Drawing of lots.

Final

5 December 2020
14:00 UTC−5

Sporting Cristal	1–1 (a.e.t.)	Ayacucho
Herrera 27' (pen.)	Report	Mendieta 54'
Penalties
Herrera (penalty scored); Cazulo (penalty scored); Calcaterra (penalty missed); Corozo (penalty missed); Sandoval (penalty missed)	2–3	(penalty scored) J. Villamarín; (penalty scored) Mendieta; (penalty scored) Rojas; (penalty missed) Souza

Estadio Monumental, Lima
Attendance: 0
Referee: Miguel Santiváñez

=== Aggregate table ===
Pos	Team	Pld	W	D	L	GF	GA	GD	Pts	Qualification or relegation
1	Sporting Cristal (C)	28	16	8	4	58	32	+26	56	Qualification for Playoffs and Copa Libertadores group stage
2	Universitario	28	16	6	6	50	35	+15	54	Qualification for Playoffs and Copa Libertadores group stage
3	Universidad César Vallejo	28	13	12	3	41	23	+18	51	Qualification for Copa Libertadores first stage
4	Ayacucho	28	13	8	7	42	26	+16	47	Qualification for Playoffs and Copa Libertadores second stage
5	Carlos A. Mannucci	28	12	9	7	41	29	+12	45	Qualification for Copa Sudamericana first stage
6	Sport Huancayo	28	12	8	8	32	30	+2	44	Qualification for Copa Sudamericana first stage
7	UTC	28	10	13	5	42	29	+13	43	Qualification for Copa Sudamericana first stage
8	Melgar	28	11	8	9	41	34	+7	41	Qualification for Copa Sudamericana first stage
9	Cienciano	28	12	5	11	39	34	+5	41	
10	Alianza Universidad	28	10	7	11	29	30	−1	37	
11	Universidad San Martín	28	10	7	11	32	37	−5	37	
12	Cusco	28	9	9	10	39	41	−2	36	
13	Binacional	28	10	6	12	35	42	−7	36	
14	Sport Boys	28	9	5	14	34	51	−17	32	
15	Deportivo Municipal	28	6	12	10	29	38	−9	30	
16	Cantolao	28	7	7	14	32	48	−16	28	
17	Alianza Lima	28	6	8	14	28	36	−8	26	
18	Atlético Grau (R)	28	5	11	12	26	39	−13	26	Relegation to 2021 Liga 2
19	Carlos Stein (R)	28	7	7	14	30	44	−14	28	Relegation to 2021 Liga 2
20	Deportivo Llacuabamba (R)	28	5	6	17	41	63	−22	21	Relegation to 2021 Liga 2

Source: ADFP
Rules for classification: 1) Points; 2) Goal difference; 3) Goals for; 4) Head-to-head points; 5) Head-to-head goal difference; 6) Head-to-head goals for; 7) Fair play points; 8) Drawing of lots.
(C) Champions; (R) Relegated

==== Semi-final ====
9 December 2020
15:30 UTC−5

Sporting Cristal	2–1	Ayacucho
Corozo 27'; Herrera 36'	Report	Sosa 60'

Estadio Monumental, Lima
Attendance: 0
Referee: Kevin Ortega
12 December 2020
15:00 UTC−5

Ayacucho	1–4	Sporting Cristal
Solis 9' (o.g.)	Report	Olivares 36'; Herrera 47'; Corozo 50'; Liza 81'

Estadio Monumental, Lima
Attendance: 0
Referee: Diego Haro

=== Final ===
16 December 2020
19:00 UTC−5

Universitario	1–2	Sporting Cristal
Quintero 66'	Report	Chávez 26'; Cazulo 52'

Estadio Nacional, Lima
Attendance: 0
Referee: Joel Alarcón
20 December 2020
15:00 UTC−5

Sporting Cristal	1–1	Universitario
Alfageme 69' (o.g.)	Report	Quintero 50'

Estadio Nacional, Lima
Attendance: 0
Referee: Víctor Hugo Carrillo

== Liga 2 ==
=== Table ===
Pos	Team	Pld	W	D	L	GF	GA	GD	Pts	Qualification
1	Unión Huaral	9	5	3	1	20	14	+6	18	Advance to Liguilla Semifinals
2	Sport Chavelines	9	5	2	2	14	8	+6	17	Advance to Liguilla Semifinals
3	Alianza Atlético	9	5	2	2	16	11	+5	17	Advance to Liguilla Semifinals
4	Juan Aurich	9	5	1	3	14	12	+2	16	Advance to Liguilla Semifinals
5	Pirata	9	4	3	2	15	10	+5	15	
6	Comerciantes Unidos	9	3	3	3	14	12	+2	12	
7	Unión Comercio	9	3	2	4	10	12	−2	11	
8	Deportivo Coopsol	9	2	2	5	5	10	−5	8	
9	Santos	9	1	3	5	16	20	−4	6	
10	Cultural Santa Rosa	9	1	1	7	6	19	−13	4	

Source: Liga 2 - official site
Rules for classification: 1) points; 2) goal difference; 3) goals scored; 4) draw.

=== Semi-finals ===
23 December 2020
15:00 UTC−5

Sport Chavelines	2–4	Alianza Atlético
Orejuela 37'; Giménez 89'		Perlaza 51'; Lugo 74'; Ganoza 77'; Barreda 81'

Estadio Universidad San Marcos, Lima
Attendance: 0
Referee: Miguel Santiváñez
23 December 2020
18:30 UTC−5

Unión Huaral	3–4 (a.e.t.)	Juan Aurich
López 13'; Mena 83'; Mena 106'		Príncipe 43'; Príncipe 72'; Ramírez 99'; Collante 105'

Estadio Universidad San Marcos, Lima
Attendance: 0
Referee: Michael Espinoza

=== Final ===
27 December 2020
14:00 UTC−5

Alianza Atlético	2–1 (a.e.t.)	Juan Aurich
Córdoba 109'; Lugo 113' (pen.)		León 118'

Estadio Monumental
Attendance: 0
Referee: Joel Alarcón

== Women's football ==
=== Liga Femenina ===
Canceled due to the COVID-19 pandemic.
