= 2020 Club Universitario de Deportes season =

Universitario de Deportes
2020 season
- Manager: Gregorio Pérez; Angel Comizzo
- Stadium: Estadio Monumental
- Peruvian Primera División: Runners-up
- Copa Libertadores: Second stage
Home colours	Away colours

The 2020 season was Universitario de Deportes' 96th season since its founding in 1924. The club played the Liga 1 and the Copa Libertadores.

== Competitions ==
=== Liga 1 ===
==== Fase 1 ====
Pos	Team	Pld	W	D	L	GF	GA	GD	Pts	Qualification
1	Universitario	19	13	4	2	38	18	+20	42	Advance to Playoffs and qualification for Copa Libertadores
2	Sport Huancayo	19	10	5	4	23	15	+8	35	
3	Sporting Cristal	19	9	6	4	38	23	+15	33	

Results

Home \ Away	ALI	AUH	CAG	AYA	BIN	CAN	CAM	STE	CIE	CUS	LLA	MUN	MEL	SBA	SHU	CRI	UCV	USM	UNI	UTC
Alianza Lima	—	—	—	—	—	—	—	—	—	—	—	—	—	—	—	—	—	—	—	—
Alianza Universidad	—	—	—	—	—	—	—	—	—	—	—	—	—	—	—	—	—	—	—	—
Atlético Grau	—	—	—	—	—	—	—	—	—	—	—	—	—	—	—	—	—	—	—	—
Ayacucho	—	—	—	—	—	—	—	—	—	—	—	—	—	—	—	—	—	—	—	—
Binacional	—	—	—	—	—	—	—	—	—	—	—	—	—	—	—	—	—	—	—	—
Cantolao	—	—	—	—	—	—	—	—	—	—	—	—	—	—	—	—	—	—	0–0	—
Carlos A. Mannucci	—	—	—	—	—	—	—	—	—	—	—	—	—	—	—	—	—	—	2–2	—
Carlos Stein	—	—	—	—	—	—	—	—	—	—	—	—	—	—	—	—	—	—	1–3	—
Cienciano	—	—	—	—	—	—	—	—	—	—	—	—	—	—	—	—	—	—	1–3	—
Cusco	—	—	—	—	—	—	—	—	—	—	—	—	—	—	—	—	—	—	—	—
Deportivo Llacuabamba	—	—	—	—	—	—	—	—	—	—	—	—	—	—	—	—	—	—	0–1	—
Deportivo Municipal	—	—	—	—	—	—	—	—	—	—	—	—	—	—	—	—	—	—	0–5	—
Melgar	—	—	—	—	—	—	—	—	—	—	—	—	—	—	—	—	—	—	1–2	—
Sport Boys	—	—	—	—	—	—	—	—	—	—	—	—	—	—	—	—	—	—	3–3	—
Sport Huancayo	—	—	—	—	—	—	—	—	—	—	—	—	—	—	—	—	—	—	—	—
Sporting Cristal	—	—	—	—	—	—	—	—	—	—	—	—	—	—	—	—	—	—	1–0	—
Universidad César Vallejo	—	—	—	—	—	—	—	—	—	—	—	—	—	—	—	—	—	—	—	—
Universidad San Martín	—	—	—	—	—	—	—	—	—	—	—	—	—	—	—	—	—	—	—	—
Universitario	2–0	3–2	2–0	1–0	1–1	—	—	—	—	3–2	—	—	—	—	2–1	—	0–2	2–0	—	—
UTC	—	—	—	—	—	—	—	—	—	—	—	—	—	—	—	—	—	—	1–3	—

Source: ADFP, Soccerway
Legend: Blue = home team win; Yellow = draw; Red = away team win.

==== Fase 2 ====
Pos	Team	Pld	W	D	L	GF	GA	GD	Pts	Qualification	CRI	USM	UTC	CIE	BIN	UNI	STE	CAG	AUH	CAN
1	Sporting Cristal	9	7	2	0	20	9	+11	23	Advance to Stage 2 final	—	—	—	—	—	2–2	—	—	—	—
2	Universidad San Martín	9	5	1	3	12	10	+2	16		—	—	—	—	—	—	—	—	—	—
3	UTC	9	3	5	1	18	9	+9	14		—	—	—	—	—	—	—	—	—	—
4	Cienciano	9	4	2	3	12	11	+1	14		—	—	—	—	—	—	—	—	—	—
5	Binacional	9	4	1	4	11	13	−2	13		—	—	—	—	—	0–2	—	—	—	—
6	Universitario	9	3	2	4	12	17	−5	11		—	2–3	1–6	0–1	—	—	0–2	2–1	—	—
7	Carlos Stein	9	3	1	5	12	16	−4	10		—	—	—	—	—	—	—	—	—	—
8	Atlético Grau	9	2	3	4	9	12	−3	9		—	—	—	—	—	—	—	—	—	—
9	Alianza Universidad	9	2	2	5	8	13	−5	8		—	—	—	—	—	0–1	—	—	—	—
10	Cantolao	9	1	3	5	11	15	−4	6		—	—	—	—	—	2–2	—	—	—	—

Source: ADFP, Soccerway
Legend: Blue = home team win; Yellow = draw; Red = away team win.
Rules for classification: 1) Points; 2) Goal difference; 3) Goals for; 4) Drawing of lots.

==== Final ====
16 December 2020	Universitario	1–2	Sporting Cristal	Estadio Nacional, Lima
19:00 UTC−5	Quintero 66'	Report	Chávez 26'; Cazulo 52'	Attendance: 0 Referee: Joel Alarcón

20 December 2020	Sporting Cristal	1–1	Universitario	Estadio Nacional, Lima
15:00 UTC−5	Alfageme 69' (o.g.)	Report	Quintero 50'	Attendance: 0 Referee: Víctor Hugo Carrillo

=== Copa Libertadores ===
==== First stage ====
21 January 2020	Carabobo (Venezuela)	1–1	(Peru) Universitario	Polideportivo Cachamay, Ciudad Guayana (Note: Carabobo played their home match at Polideportivo Cachamay, Ciudad Guayana, instead of their regular stadium Estadio Misael Delgado, Valencia, which was being remodeled.)
18:15 UTC−4	Tortolero 46'	Report	Dos Santos 83'	Referee: Alexander Ospina (Colombia)

28 January 2020	Universitario (Peru)	1–0	(Venezuela) Carabobo	Estadio Monumental, Lima
19:30 UTC−5	Alonso 24'	Report		Referee: Bráulio Machado (Brazil)

==== Second stage ====
5 February 2020	Universitario (Peru)	1–1	(Paraguay) Cerro Porteño	Estadio Monumental, Lima
17:15 UTC−5	Dos Santos 52'	Report	Ruiz 65'	Referee: Andrés Rojas (Colombia)

12 February 2020	Cerro Porteño (Paraguay)	1–0	(Peru) Universitario	Estadio General Pablo Rojas, Asunción
19:15 UTC−3	Carrizo 61'	Report		Referee: Patricio Loustau (Argentina)
