= 2020 Liga 2 (Peru) =

Liga 2
- Season: 2020
- Dates: 27 October – 27 December 2020
- Champions: Alianza Atlético
- Matches: 48
- Goals: 146 (3.04 per match)
- Top goalscorer: Carlos López; Víctor Perlaza (7 goals each)
- Highest scoring: Unión Huaral 5–5 Pirata (11 November)

The 2020 Liga 2 season was the 68th edition of the second tier of Federación Peruana de Futbol. The season's play started on October 27, 2020, and ended on December 27, 2020.

== Teams ==
=== Promotion and relegation (pre-season) ===
A total of 10 teams contested the league, including 7 sides from the 2019 season, two relegated from the 2019 Liga 1, and one promoted from the 2019 Copa Perú.

==== Teams promoted to Liga 1 ====
On 11 November 2019, Cienciano were the first team to be promoted to Liga 1, ending a four-year run in the Peruvian Segunda División/Liga 2, after defeating Santos by 4−2. The second team to earn promotion to Liga 1 was play-offs winner Atlético Grau, after a goal-less draw against Sport Chavelines on 11 December 2019. This marked the end to a two-year run in the second division.

==== Teams relegated from Liga 1 ====
The first team to be relegated from Liga 1 were Pirata. Their relegation was ensured on 1 November 2019, after Sport Boys beat Melgar 4−2, suffering an immediate relegation from the debut season in the first division. The second team to be relegated were Unión Comercio, who were relegated on 22 November 2019 after they were deducted 3 points for submitting fraudulent paperwork regarding the team doctor during a game against Universidad San Martín.

==== Teams relegated from Liga 2 ====
The first team to be relegated from Liga 2 were Sport Victoria, expelled on 9 August 2019, due to their failure to pay their players. This ended a seven-year spell in Segunda División. The second team to be relegated were Los Caimanes, who were relegated on 20 October 2019 after losing 3−1 against Juan Aurich, ending a five-year run in the second division. The third and final relegated club was Sport Loreto, after a walk-over win over Sport Victoria on 25 October 2019 ending a four-year spell in the second division.

==== Teams promoted to Liga 2 ====
The first and only team to achieve promotion was Sport Chavelines after a 1−1 draw against Sport Estrella during the 2019 Copa Perú's final group stage on 1 December 2019.

=== Team changes ===
Promoted from 2019 Cuadrangular de Ascenso	Relegated from 2019 Liga 1	Promoted to 2020 Liga 1	Relegated to 2021 Copa Perú
▲ Sport Chavelines (4th)	▼ Unión Comercio (17th) ▼ Pirata (18th)	▲ Cienciano (1st) ▲ Atlético Grau (CA - 1st)	▼ Sport Loreto (10th) ▼ Los Caimanes (11th) ▼ Sport Victoria (12th)

=== Stadia and locations ===
Locations of the 2020 Liga 2 teams

Team	City
Alianza Atlético	Sullana
Comerciantes Unidos	Cutervo
Cultural Santa Rosa	Andahuaylas
Deportivo Coopsol	San Vicente de Cañete
Juan Aurich	Chiclayo
Pirata	Olmos
Santos	Nasca
Sport Chavelines	Pacasmayo
Unión Comercio	Nueva Cajamarca
Unión Huaral	Huaral

Because of the COVID-19 pandemic, the whole tournament was played in two stadiums:

Stadium	City
Universidad San Marcos	Lima
Villa Deportiva Nacional	Lima

Estadio Monumental "U", Estadio Alberto Gallardo, Estadio Miguel Grau were also used for matchday 9 during which all matches were played simultaneously.

== Effects of the COVID-19 pandemic ==
The leaders of the clubs playing in Liga 2 originally proposed to begin playing the tournament on 2 May before the government announced a nation-wide lockdown on 15 March. The tournament was then indefinitely postponed.

On 2 June, the Peruvian government through its Ministry of Health and the Instituto Peruano del Deporte (IPD) approved the biosecurity protocol presented by the Peruvian Football Federation to allow the resumption of the sports competitions, authorizing clubs to resume training sessions. On 2 September, the FPF and the Liga de Fútbol Profesional announced that the league would begin play on 26 October, with training sessions to resume on 28 September. It was also announced that the whole season would be played in Lima to avoid the constant travel between cities that clubs must do under normal circumstances. The FPF also awarded US$60,000 to each club as a pandemic-related financial relief.

== League table ==
=== Standings ===
Pos	Team	Pld	W	D	L	GF	GA	GD	Pts	Qualification
1	Unión Huaral	9	5	3	1	20	14	+6	18	Advance to Liguilla Semifinals
2	Sport Chavelines	9	5	2	2	14	8	+6	17	Advance to Liguilla Semifinals
3	Alianza Atlético	9	5	2	2	16	11	+5	17	Advance to Liguilla Semifinals
4	Juan Aurich	9	5	1	3	14	12	+2	16	Advance to Liguilla Semifinals
5	Pirata	9	4	3	2	15	10	+5	15	
6	Comerciantes Unidos	9	3	3	3	14	12	+2	12	
7	Unión Comercio	9	3	2	4	10	12	−2	11	
8	Deportivo Coopsol	9	2	2	5	5	10	−5	8	
9	Santos	9	1	3	5	16	20	−4	6	
10	Cultural Santa Rosa	9	1	1	7	6	19	−13	4	

Source: Liga 2 - official site
Rules for classification: 1) points; 2) goal difference; 3) goals scored; 4) draw.

=== Results ===
Home \ Away	AAS	COM	COO	CST	CHA	JA	PIR	SAN	UCO	HUA
Alianza Atlético		1–2	2–0		3–1			2–1		0–0
Comerciantes Unidos					1–1	5–1		3–2		2–3
Deportivo Coopsol		0–0		3–2				1–1	0–1	
Cultural Santa Rosa	1–3	1–0					0–3	0–1		
Sport Chavelines			1–0	4–1		2–0			1–0	0–1
Juan Aurich	4–2		1–0	0–0			0–1		2–0	
Pirata	1–2	2–0	0–1		1–1			1–1		
Santos					1–3	1–3			3–4	3–3
Unión Comercio	1–1	1–1		2–1			0–1			
Unión Huaral			2–0	3–0		1–3	5–5		2–1	

Updated to match(es) played on 2020. Source: Liga 2 - official site
Legend: Blue = home team win; Yellow = draw; Red = away team win.

== Liguilla ==
=== Bracket ===
Semi-finals
1	Unión Huaral	3
4	Juan Aurich (a.e.t)	4
2	Sport Chavelines	2
3	Alianza Atlético	4

Final
4	Juan Aurich	1
3	Alianza Atlético (a.e.t)	2

=== Semi-finals ===
23 December 2020
15:00 UTC−5

Sport Chavelines	2–4	Alianza Atlético
Orejuela 37'; Giménez 89'		Perlaza 51'; Lugo 74'; Ganoza 77'; Barreda 81'

Estadio Universidad San Marcos, Lima
Attendance: 0
Referee: Miguel Santiváñez

23 December 2020
18:30 UTC−5

Unión Huaral	3–4 (a.e.t.)	Juan Aurich
López 13'; Mena 83'; Mena 106'		Príncipe 43'; Príncipe 72'; Ramírez 99'; Collante 105'

Estadio Universidad San Marcos, Lima
Attendance: 0
Referee: Michael Espinoza

=== Final ===
27 December 2020
14:00 UTC−5

Alianza Atlético	2–1 (a.e.t.)	Juan Aurich
Córdoba 109'; Lugo 113' (pen.)		León 118'

Estadio Monumental
Attendance: 0
Referee: Joel Alarcón

== Top goalscorers ==
Rank	Name	Club	Goals
1	(Colombia) Víctor Perlaza	Alianza Atlético	7
1	(Colombia) Carlos López	Unión Huaral	7
3	(Peru) Alejandro Ramírez	Juan Aurich	6
3	(Argentina) Carlos Orejuela	Sport Chavelines	6
5	(Argentina) Matías Sen	Comerciantes Unidos	5
5	(Peru) Diego Carabaño	Unión Huaral	5

== Liga 2 awards ==
The Liga 2 awards ceremony was held on 4 May 2021, 12:00 local time at the Villa Deportiva Nacional (VIDENA). The winners were chosen based on voting by coaches and captains of 2020 Liga 2 teams and local sports journalists.

Award	Winner	Club	Nominees	Club
Best Player	(Colombia) Kevin Lugo	Alianza Atlético	(Peru) Alejandro Ramírez	Juan Aurich
Best Player	(Colombia) Kevin Lugo	Alianza Atlético	(Peru) Diego Carabaño	Unión Huaral
Best Goalkeeper	(Uruguay) Ignacio Barrios	Alianza Atlético	(Peru) Diego Campos	Sport Chavelines
Best Goalkeeper	(Uruguay) Ignacio Barrios	Alianza Atlético	(Peru) Ismael Quispe	Juan Aurich
Best Coach	(Peru) Jahir Butrón (Peru) Jesús Oropesa	Alianza Atlético	(Peru) Duilio Cisneros	Unión Huaral
Best Coach	(Peru) Jahir Butrón (Peru) Jesús Oropesa	Alianza Atlético	(Peru) José Soto	Juan Aurich
Goal of the Year	(Peru) Cristhian Vargas (against Juan Aurich, First stage)	Alianza Atlético	(Colombia) Carlos López (against Juan Aurich, Liguilla)	Unión Huaral
Goal of the Year	(Peru) Cristhian Vargas (against Juan Aurich, First stage)	Alianza Atlético	(Argentina) Ramiro Maldonado (against Unión Huaral, First stage)	Santos

== See also ==
- 2020 Liga 1
- 2020 in Peruvian football
