= 2020 Liga 1 (Peru) =

Liga 1
- Season: 2020
- Dates: 31 January – 20 December 2020
- Champions: Sporting Cristal (20th title)
- Relegated: Atlético Grau; Carlos Stein; Deportivo Llacuabamba
- Copa Libertadores: Sporting Cristal; Universitario; Ayacucho; Universidad César Vallejo
- Copa Sudamericana: Carlos A. Mannucci; Sport Huancayo; UTC; Melgar
- Matches: 284
- Goals: 750 (2.64 per match)
- Top goalscorer: Emanuel Herrera (20 goals)
- Biggest home win: Cienciano 4–0 U. San Martín (9 February); Melgar 4–0 Sport Huancayo (18 November)
- Biggest away win: Dep. Llacuabamba 0–6 Melgar (21 November)
- Highest scoring: Binacional 3–6 Sporting Cristal (17 October)

The 2020 Liga 1 de Fútbol Profesional (known as the Liga 1 Movistar 2020 for sponsorship reasons) was the 104th season of the Peruvian Primera División, the highest division of Peruvian football. A total of 20 teams competed in the season with Binacional coming in as defending champions. The season started on 31 January 2020 and concluded on 20 December 2020 with the second leg of the finals. Sporting Cristal won its 20th domestic championship by beating Universitario in the finals by a 3–2 aggregate score.

The competition was suspended between 12 March and 7 August due to the COVID-19 pandemic, being once again suspended that same day after one match had been played. It eventually resumed on 18 August 2020.

== Competition format ==
The season was divided into three stages: Torneo Apertura (Fase 1), Torneo Clausura (Fase 2), and the Playoffs.

The first and second stages were two Apertura and Clausura tournaments, later rebranded as Fase 1 and Fase 2, respectively. In the Apertura tournament, each team played the other teams once for a total of 19 games. Prior to the onset of the COVID-19 pandemic, the Clausura tournament was scheduled to be played in a similar way to the Apertura, with reversed fixtures, however, its format was altered due to the 5-month suspension of the league. For the Clausura, the 20 teams were split into two groups of 10 according to their final placement in the Apertura. Teams played the other teams in their group once, with the winners of both groups playing a final to decide the Clausura winners. Points earned during the Apertura did not carry over during the Clausura. The winners of the Apertura and Clausura stages qualified to the playoffs along with the top two teams of the aggregate table at the end of the season, unless the Apertura and Clausura winners were placed in the top two positions of the aggregate table.

The playoffs to decide the national champion were scheduled to be contested by four teams, which would play two semifinals with the winners playing the final. Since the Apertura winners also ended up in the top two of the aggregate table, they were given a bye to the final and only one semi-final was played by the other two playoff qualifiers. In every stage of the playoffs, the teams with the most points on the aggregate table chose which leg they would play as the home team. If teams were tied in points after the two legs of the final, extra time and a penalty shootout would have been played to decide the national champion. If a team won both the Apertura and Clausura, the playoffs would not be played and that team would be declared as champion.

Qualification to international competitions was as follows: the four playoff qualifiers (or the top four teams of the aggregate table in case the playoffs were contested by a lower number of teams) qualified for the 2021 Copa Libertadores, while the next three best teams in that table qualified for the 2021 Copa Sudamericana, with a fourth berth being allocated to the 2020 Copa Bicentenario winners. With the cancellation of the Copa Bicentenario due to the COVID-19 pandemic, the Copa Sudamericana berth allocated to its winner was transferred to the eighth best team in the aggregate table. The four teams with the fewest points in the aggregate table at the end of the season were to be relegated, unless the Copa Perú was not played this season, in which case only three teams would be relegated. If the Liga 2 was not played this season either, only two teams would be relegated. Eventually, only the Copa Perú was confirmed not to be held this season, with which three teams were relegated from Liga 1 at the end of the season.

== Teams ==
20 teams played in the 2020 Liga 1 season, an increase of two teams from the previous season. The top sixteen teams in the 2019 Liga 1 took part, along with 2019 Liga 2 champions Cienciano, Copa Perú champions Carlos Stein, and the top two teams of the promotion play-offs (Atlético Grau and Deportivo Llacuabamba).

On 23 December 2019, Real Garcilaso announced its name change to Cusco Fútbol Club.

=== Team changes ===
Promoted from 2019 Liga 2	Promoted from 2019 Copa Perú	Promoted from Promotion play-offs	Relegated from 2019 Liga 1
▲ Cienciano (1st)	▲ Carlos Stein (1st)	▲ Atlético Grau (1st) ▲ Deportivo Llacuabamba (2nd)	▼ Unión Comercio (17th) ▼ Pirata (18th)

=== Stadia and locations ===
Locations of the 2020 Liga 1 teams

Team	Manager	City	Stadium	Capacity
Academia Cantolao	(Peru) Jorge Espejo	Callao	Miguel Grau	17,000
Alianza Lima	(Argentina) Daniel Ahmed	Lima	Alejandro Villanueva	35,000
Alianza Universidad	(Peru) Rony Revollar	Huánuco	Heraclio Tapia	25,000
Atlético Grau	(Peru) Rafael Castillo	Piura	Miguel Grau	25,000
Atlético Grau	(Peru) Rafael Castillo	Sullana	Campeones del 36 (Note: Used by Atlético Grau as temporary home stadium while Estadio Miguel Grau is remodeled.)	12,000
Ayacucho	(Argentina) Gerardo Ameli	Ayacucho	Ciudad de Cumaná	15,000
Binacional	(Peru) Luis Flores	Juliaca	Guillermo Briceño Rosamedina	20,030
Carlos A. Mannucci	(Uruguay) Pablo Peirano	Trujillo	Mansiche	25,000
Carlos Stein	(Peru) Daniel Valderrama	Olmos	Francisco Mendoza Pizarro	7,000
Carlos Stein	(Peru) Daniel Valderrama	Guadalupe	Carlos A. Olivares (Note: Used by Carlos Stein for their Torneo Apertura home matches against Universitario and Binacional.)	12,000
Cienciano	(Argentina) Marcelo Grioni	Cusco	Garcilaso	42,056
Cusco	(Argentina) Carlos Ramacciotti	Cusco	Garcilaso	42,056
Cusco	(Argentina) Carlos Ramacciotti	Sicuani	Túpac Amaru (Note: Used by Cusco for their Torneo Apertura home match against Universidad César Vallejo.)	15,000
Deportivo Llacuabamba	(Peru) Alberto Castillo	Cajamarca	Héroes de San Ramón	18,000
Deportivo Municipal	(Peru) Víctor Rivera	Lima	Iván Elías Moreno	10,000
Deportivo Municipal	(Peru) Víctor Rivera	Lima	Universidad San Marcos (Note: Used by Deportivo Municipal as temporary home stadium while Estadio Iván Elías Moreno was remodeled.)	43,000
Melgar	(Peru) Marco Valencia (caretaker)	Arequipa	Virgen de Chapi	60,000
Sport Boys	(Peru) Teddy Cardama	Callao	Miguel Grau	17,000
Sport Huancayo	(Peru) Wilmar Valencia	Huancayo	Estadio Huancayo	20,000
Sporting Cristal	(Peru) Roberto Mosquera	Lima	Alberto Gallardo	18,000
Universidad César Vallejo	(Peru) José del Solar	Trujillo	Mansiche	25,000
Universidad San Martín	(Venezuela) Héctor Bidoglio	Lima	Alberto Gallardo	18,000
Universitario	(Argentina) Ángel Comizzo	Lima	Monumental	80,093
UTC	(Peru) Franco Navarro	Cajamarca	Héroes de San Ramón	18,000

Starting from the seventh round of Stage 1, the following stadiums were used to host matches. Estadio Monumental in Lima was also included as a host stadium starting from the second round of Stage 2:

Stadium	City
Alberto Gallardo	Lima
Alejandro Villanueva	Lima
Iván Elías Moreno	Lima
Miguel Grau	Callao
Monumental	Lima
Nacional	Lima
Universidad San Marcos	Lima
Villa Deportiva Nacional	Lima

=== Managerial changes ===
Team	Outgoing manager	Manner of departure	Date of vacancy	Position in table	Incoming manager	Date of appointment
Torneo Apertura
Sport Huancayo	(Argentina) Carlos Ramacciotti	Resigned	18 November 2019	Pre-season	(Peru) Wilmar Valencia	19 December 2019
Academia Cantolao	(Peru) Jorge Araujo	End of contract	24 November 2019	Pre-season	(Argentina) Hernán Lisi	14 December 2019
UTC	(Argentina) Gerardo Ameli	End of contract	24 November 2019	Pre-season	(Peru) Franco Navarro	28 November 2019
Melgar	(Peru) Marco Valencia	End of caretaker spell	24 November 2019	Pre-season	(Argentina) Carlos Bustos	2 December 2019
Ayacucho	(Uruguay) Mario Viera	Signed by Carlos A. Mannucci	27 November 2019	Pre-season	(Argentina) Gerardo Ameli	29 November 2019
Carlos A. Mannucci	(Uruguay) Pablo Peirano	End of contract	28 November 2019	Pre-season	(Argentina) Juan Manuel Llop	1 December 2019
Universidad San Martín	(Argentina) Carlos Bustos	End of contract	28 November 2019	Pre-season	(Venezuela) Héctor Bidoglio	13 December 2019
Universitario	(Argentina) Ángel Comizzo	End of contract	28 November 2019	Pre-season	(Uruguay) Gregorio Pérez	3 December 2019
Deportivo Llacuabamba	(Peru) Roberto Tristán	Resigned	5 December 2019	Pre-season	(Argentina) Néstor Clausen	10 January 2020
Binacional	(Peru) Roberto Mosquera	End of contract	15 December 2019	Pre-season	(Argentina) César Vigevani	1 January 2020
Atlético Grau	(Peru) Wilmar Valencia	Signed by Sport Huancayo	19 December 2019	Pre-season	(Peru) Pablo Zegarra	8 January 2020
Carlos Stein	(Peru) Juan Carlos Bazalar	Mutual consent	20 December 2019	Pre-season	(Peru) Orlando Lavalle	31 December 2019
Binacional	(Argentina) César Vigevani	Resigned	10 February 2020	8th	(Peru) Willy Escapa (caretaker)	11 February 2020
Sporting Cristal	(Peru) Manuel Barreto	Sacked	20 February 2020	13th	(Peru) Jorge Soto (caretaker)	20 February 2020
Sporting Cristal	(Peru) Jorge Soto	End of caretaker spell	23 February 2020	14th	(Peru) Roberto Mosquera	23 February 2020
Binacional	(Peru) Willy Escapa	End of caretaker spell	24 February 2020	2nd	(Colombia) Flabio Torres	24 February 2020
Deportivo Llacuabamba	(Argentina) Néstor Clausen	Sacked	1 March 2020	18th	(Colombia) Néstor Otero	2 March 2020
Cusco	(Peru) Javier Arce	Sacked	3 March 2020	17th	(Argentina) Carlos Ramacciotti	5 March 2020
Carlos A. Mannucci	(Argentina) Juan Manuel Llop	Mutual consent	7 March 2020	14th	(Uruguay) Pablo Peirano	13 March 2020
Alianza Lima	(Uruguay) Pablo Bengoechea	Resigned	8 March 2020	13th	(Chile) Mario Salas	16 March 2020
Atlético Grau	(Peru) Pablo Zegarra	Sacked	9 March 2020	20th	(Peru) Rafael Castillo	9 March 2020
Universitario	(Uruguay) Gregorio Pérez	Mutual consent	12 June 2020	4th	(Argentina) Ángel Comizzo	20 June 2020
Binacional	(Colombia) Flabio Torres	Mutual consent	8 September 2020	6th	(Peru) Javier Arce	8 September 2020
Cusco	(Argentina) Carlos Ramacciotti	Mutual consent	9 September 2020	11th	(Peru) Francisco Melgar	9 September 2020
Sport Boys	(Argentina) Marcelo Vivas	Resigned	13 September 2020	16th	(Peru) Luis Hernández (caretaker)	15 September 2020
Carlos Stein	(Peru) Orlando Lavalle	Mutual consent	19 September 2020	16th	(Peru) Juan Carlos Bazalar	23 September 2020
Sport Boys	(Peru) Luis Hernández	Resigned	22 September 2020	19th	(Peru) Teddy Cardama	23 September 2020
Melgar	(Argentina) Carlos Bustos	Sacked	24 September 2020	11th	(Peru) Marco Valencia (caretaker)	24 September 2020
Deportivo Llacuabamba	(Colombia) Néstor Otero	Sacked	27 September 2020	20th	(Peru) Alberto Castillo	27 September 2020
Cusco	(Peru) Francisco Melgar	Return to Deportivo Coopsol	1 October 2020	14th	(Argentina) Carlos Ramacciotti	7 October 2020
Torneo Clausura
Binacional	(Peru) Javier Arce	Mutual consent	26 October 2020	10th, Group A	(Peru) Luis Flores	29 October 2020
Academia Cantolao	(Argentina) Hernán Lisi	Sacked	27 October 2020	8th, Group A	(Peru) Jorge Espejo	28 October 2020
Alianza Lima	(Chile) Mario Salas	Sacked	1 November 2020	8th, Group B	(Peru) Guillermo Salas (caretaker)	1 November 2020
Alianza Lima	(Peru) Guillermo Salas	End of caretaker spell	6 November 2020	7th, Group B	(Argentina) Daniel Ahmed	6 November 2020
Carlos Stein	(Peru) Juan Carlos Bazalar	Sacked	8 November 2020	8th, Group A	(Peru) Iván Chávez (caretaker)	8 November 2020
Carlos Stein	(Peru) Iván Chávez	End of caretaker spell	11 November 2020	6th, Group A	(Peru) Daniel Valderrama	13 November 2020

== Effects of the COVID-19 pandemic ==
On 12 March, the Liga de Fútbol Profesional announced the decision to temporarily suspend the competition after the sixth round of the Torneo Apertura until at least 30 March due to the COVID-19 pandemic.

On 2 June, the Peruvian government through its Ministry of Health and the Instituto Peruano del Deporte (IPD) approved the biosecurity protocol presented by the Peruvian Football Federation to allow the resumption of the competition, authorizing clubs to resume their training sessions. On 8 June, the FPF and the Liga de Fútbol Profesional announced that the league would resume on 31 July with the seventh round of the Torneo Apertura, with training sessions to resume on 22 June. It was also announced that all the remaining matches of the season would be relocated to Lima to avoid the constant travel between cities that clubs must do under normal circumstances, as well as an alteration to the competition format. However, after some delays with COVID-19 testing, the date for resumption was pushed back to 7 August.

On 5 August nine positive cases of COVID-19 were confirmed in Binacional, following the application of tests ordered by the FPF after some players of said club breached the biosecurity protocol upon their arrival to Lima. In response to this finding the FPF's Medical Commission recommended the isolation of the entire Binacional delegation, meaning that their match against Alianza Lima scheduled for 9 August would not be played.

On the evening of 7 August, and due to an agglomeration of Universitario fans in the outskirts of the Estadio Nacional before their club's match against Cantolao breaching biosecurity protocols, the IPD ordered the suspension of the remaining matches scheduled for the seventh round of the Torneo Apertura. On 14 August, and following coordination meetings with authorities and awareness and prevention campaigns performed with fans, the IPD approved the proposal from the FPF to resume the competition on 18 August.

== Fase 1 ==
=== Standings ===
Pos	Team	Pld	W	D	L	GF	GA	GD	Pts	Qualification
1	Universitario (Note: Universitario were deducted one point as punishment for failing to pay debts.)	19	13	4	2	38	18	+20	42	Advance to Playoffs and qualification for Copa Libertadores
2	Sport Huancayo	19	10	5	4	23	15	+8	35	
3	Sporting Cristal	19	9	6	4	38	23	+15	33	
4	Universidad César Vallejo	19	8	9	2	25	16	+9	33	
5	Carlos A. Mannucci	19	7	8	4	28	22	+6	29	
6	UTC	19	7	8	4	24	20	+4	29	
7	Alianza Universidad	19	8	5	6	21	17	+4	29	
8	Melgar	19	7	7	5	23	20	+3	28	
9	Ayacucho	19	7	6	6	28	21	+7	27	
10	Cienciano	19	8	3	8	27	23	+4	27	
11	Binacional	19	6	5	8	24	29	−5	23	
12	Alianza Lima	19	5	7	7	19	20	−1	22	
13	Academia Cantolao	19	6	4	9	21	33	−12	22	
14	Deportivo Municipal	19	4	9	6	20	24	−4	21	
15	Cusco	19	5	6	8	26	31	−5	21	
16	Universidad San Martín	19	5	6	8	20	27	−7	21	
17	Sport Boys (Note: Sport Boys were deducted one point as punishment for failing to pay debts with their employees.)	19	5	5	9	24	33	−9	19	
18	Carlos Stein (Note: Carlos Stein were deducted one point as punishment for failing to pay debts.)	19	4	6	9	18	28	−10	17	
19	Atlético Grau	19	3	8	8	17	27	−10	17	
20	Deportivo Llacuabamba	19	2	5	12	25	42	−17	11	

Source: ADFP, Soccerway
Rules for classification: 1) Points; 2) Goal difference; 3) Goals for; 4) Fair play points; 5) Drawing of lots; 6) Play-off (only if needed to decide first place).
If two teams are tied in points for first place: 2) Play-off.

=== Results ===
Home \ Away	ALI	AUH	CAG	AYA	BIN	CAN	CAM	STE	CIE	CUS	LLA	MUN	MEL	SBA	SHU	CRI	UCV	USM	UNI	UTC
Alianza Lima		2–3	1–0		3–0 (Note: Match awarded 3–0 to Alianza Lima due to a breach of the biosecurity protocols by Binacional, which caused the match to be cancelled.)					0–0	2–0	1–0		1–1			1–1	0–1		0–2
Alianza Universidad					1–2		0–1	1–0	1–0	1–0	3–0	1–1		0–1			0–0			0–0
Atlético Grau		1–1		2–2	2–2					1–1		3–2		2–3			1–1	0–0		0–0
Ayacucho	2–0	1–1			1–0		1–2	3–0		1–1		1–2		2–1	1–1					1–1
Binacional						2–3	0–1		0–0		2–1	1–3	2–4	3–1		3–6				1–0
Academia Cantolao	1–0	1–2	1–0	0–2				2–2	2–1				0–2		1–3	2–6			0–0	
Carlos A. Mannucci	1–1		0–2			0–1			0–2		1–0		1–1		0–1	3–3	1–1		2–2	
Carlos Stein	0–2		1–1		1–1		0–3			1–2	3–3						2–2	1–2	1–3	0–1
Cienciano	2–1		3–0 (Note: Match awarded 3–0 to Cienciano due to Atlético Grau fielding an unauthorized player. The match originally ended 0–0.)	1–4				0–1			5–2		3–1		0–0	0–0		4–0	1–3	
Cusco					0–2	1–1	0–4		2–3		2–2	1–1	3–1	2–0			2–1			
Deportivo Llacuabamba			2–0	1–3		3–1							1–1		0–2	1–4	2–3	1–2	0–1	2–2
Deportivo Municipal						2–0	0–1	1–1	0–1		2–2		1–2			1–1			0–5	0–0
Melgar	2–2	1–0	3–0	0–0				0–2							1–0	1–0		1–1	1–2	
Sport Boys						1–2	3–3	0–1	2–1		3–2	1–1	1–0		0–1	1–4			3–3	
Sport Huancayo	1–1	0–1	1–0		1–0			1–0		3–2		1–1						4–3		2–0
Sporting Cristal	1–1	2–1	1–2	2–1				0–1		3–2					0–0			2–0	1–0	
Universidad César Vallejo				2–1	0–2	1–1			1–0			1–1	0–0	2–0	2–0	1–1				
Universidad San Martín		1–2		3–1	0–0	2–1	2–2			1–2		0–1		1–1			0–1			1–1
Universitario	2–0	3–2	2–0	1–0	1–1					3–2					2–1		0–2	2–0		
UTC						3–1	2–2		3–0	2–1			1–1	2–1		2–1	1–3		1–3	

Source: ADFP, Soccerway
Legend: Blue = home team win; Yellow = draw; Red = away team win.

== Fase 2 ==
=== Group A ===
Pos	Team	Pld	W	D	L	GF	GA	GD	Pts	Qualification	CRI	USM	UTC	CIE	BIN	UNI	STE	CAG	AUH	CAN
1	Sporting Cristal	9	7	2	0	20	9	+11	23	Advance to Stage 2 final						2–2	1–0		2–0	3–2
2	Universidad San Martín	9	5	1	3	12	10	+2	16		0–2		1–1	1–2	0–2					
3	UTC	9	3	5	1	18	9	+9	14		1–1				3–0			0–0	1–2	4–2
4	Cienciano	9	4	2	3	12	11	+1	14		2–3		1–1		1–1			1–0	2–0	
5	Binacional	9	4	1	4	11	13	−2	13		1–2					0–2		1–3	2–1	1–0
6	Universitario	9	3	2	4	12	17	−5	11			2–3	1–6	0–1			0–2	2–1		
7	Carlos Stein	9	3	1	5	12	16	−4	10			0–2	1–1	3–2	1–3					2–1
8	Atlético Grau	9	2	3	4	9	12	−3	9		1–4	0–2					3–1		1–1	
9	Alianza Universidad	9	2	2	5	8	13	−5	8			0–1				0–1	3–2			1–1
10	Academia Cantolao	9	1	3	5	11	15	−4	6			1–2		2–0		2–2		0–0		

Source: ADFP, Soccerway
Legend: Blue = home team win; Yellow = draw; Red = away team win.
Rules for classification: 1) Points; 2) Goal difference; 3) Goals for; 4) Drawing of lots.

=== Group B ===
Pos	Team	Pld	W	D	L	GF	GA	GD	Pts	Qualification	AYA	UCV	CAM	CUS	MEL	SBA	LLA	MUN	SHU	ALI
1	Ayacucho	9	6	2	1	14	5	+9	20	Advance to Stage 2 final		1–1	1–0	3–1	2–0					
2	Universidad César Vallejo	9	5	3	1	16	7	+9	18							3–1	2–0	0–1		4–1
3	Carlos A. Mannucci	9	5	1	3	13	7	+6	16			2–3		0–2	0–0				2–1	1–0
4	Cusco	9	4	3	2	13	10	+3	15			1–1			3–1	1–2			0–0	1–0
5	Melgar	9	4	1	4	18	14	+4	13			0–2				4–1		3–2	4–0	0–4
6	Sport Boys	9	4	0	5	10	18	−8	12		0–1		0–4					1–0	3–2	
7	Deportivo Llacuabamba	9	3	1	5	16	21	−5	10		1–0		0–2	2–3	0–6	3–0				
8	Deportivo Municipal	9	2	3	4	9	14	−5	9		1–1		0–2	1–1			2–5		0–0	
9	Sport Huancayo	9	2	3	4	9	15	−6	9		0–3	0–0					4–3			2–0
10	Alianza Lima	9	1	1	7	9	16	−7	4		1–2					0–2	2–2	1–2		

Source: ADFP, Soccerway
Legend: Blue = home team win; Yellow = draw; Red = away team win.
Rules for classification: 1) Points; 2) Goal difference; 3) Goals for; 4) Drawing of lots.

=== Fase 2 final ===
5 December 2020
14:00 UTC−5

Sporting Cristal	1–1 (a.e.t.)	Ayacucho
Herrera 27' (pen.)	Report	Mendieta 54'
Penalties
Herrera (penalty scored); Cazulo (penalty scored); Calcaterra (penalty missed); Corozo (penalty missed); Sandoval (penalty missed)	2–3	(penalty scored) J. Villamarín; (penalty scored) Mendieta; (penalty scored) Rojas; (penalty missed) Souza

Estadio Monumental, Lima
Attendance: 0
Referee: Miguel Santiváñez

== Aggregate table ==
Both stages (1 and 2) of the 2020 season will be aggregated into a single league table throughout the season to determine two of the teams that will qualify for the playoffs and the Copa Libertadores and four Copa Sudamericana qualifiers, as well as those to be relegated at the end of the season.

Pos	Team	Pld	W	D	L	GF	GA	GD	Pts	Qualification or relegation
1	Sporting Cristal (C)	28	16	8	4	58	32	+26	56	Qualification for Playoffs and Copa Libertadores group stage
2	Universitario (Note: Universitario were deducted one point as punishment for failing to pay debts.)	28	16	6	6	50	35	+15	53	Qualification for Playoffs and Copa Libertadores group stage
3	Universidad César Vallejo	28	13	12	3	41	23	+18	51	Qualification for Copa Libertadores first stage
4	Ayacucho	28	13	8	7	42	26	+16	47	Qualification for Playoffs and Copa Libertadores second stage
5	Carlos A. Mannucci	28	12	9	7	41	29	+12	45	Qualification for Copa Sudamericana first stage
6	Sport Huancayo	28	12	8	8	32	30	+2	44	Qualification for Copa Sudamericana first stage
7	UTC	28	10	13	5	42	29	+13	43	Qualification for Copa Sudamericana first stage
8	Melgar	28	11	8	9	41	34	+7	41	Qualification for Copa Sudamericana first stage
9	Cienciano	28	12	5	11	39	34	+5	41	
10	Alianza Universidad	28	10	7	11	29	30	−1	37	
11	Universidad San Martín	28	10	7	11	32	37	−5	37	
12	Cusco	28	9	9	10	39	41	−2	36	
13	Binacional	28	10	6	12	35	42	−7	36	
14	Sport Boys (Note: Sport Boys were deducted one point as punishment for failing to pay debts with their employees.)	28	9	5	14	34	51	−17	31	
15	Deportivo Municipal	28	6	12	10	29	38	−9	30	
16	Academia Cantolao	28	7	7	14	32	48	−16	28	
17	Alianza Lima	28	6	8	14	28	36	−8	26	
18	Atlético Grau (R)	28	5	11	12	26	39	−13	26	Relegation to 2021 Liga 2
19	Carlos Stein (Note: Carlos Stein were deducted three points as punishment for failing to pay debts.) (R)	28	7	7	14	30	44	−14	25	Relegation to 2021 Liga 2
20	Deportivo Llacuabamba (Note: Deportivo Llacuabamba were deducted one point as punishment for failing to pay debts.) (R)	28	5	6	17	41	63	−22	20	Relegation to 2021 Liga 2

Source: ADFP
Rules for classification: 1) Points; 2) Goal difference; 3) Goals for; 4) Head-to-head points; 5) Head-to-head goal difference; 6) Head-to-head goals for; 7) Fair play points; 8) Drawing of lots.
(C) Champions; (R) Relegated

=== Alianza Lima and CAS decision ===
On 28 November 2020, Alianza Lima were relegated to Liga 2 following a 2–0 loss to Sport Huancayo on the last matchday of the season, however, prior to this event the club's board had requested to the FPF the application of a two-point deduction on Carlos Stein for failing to comply with economic regulations. Since the FPF initially ruled that Carlos Stein would only get fined, Alianza Lima lodged an appeal to the Court of Arbitration for Sport (CAS). After months without a final decision and with the 2021 season already underway, on 17 March 2021 the CAS ruled in favor of Alianza Lima and deducted two points from Carlos Stein in the 2020 season's aggregate table, thus reinstating Alianza Lima in the top tier while Carlos Stein ended up relegated.

== Playoffs ==
Semi-finals				Finals
				Universitario	1	1	2
				Sporting Cristal	2	1	3
Sporting Cristal	2	4	6	Sporting Cristal	2	1	3
Ayacucho	1	1	2

=== Semi-final ===
==== First leg ====
9 December 2020
15:30 UTC−5

Sporting Cristal	2–1	Ayacucho
Corozo 27'; Herrera 36'	Report	Sosa 60'

Estadio Monumental, Lima
Attendance: 0
Referee: Kevin Ortega

==== Second leg ====
12 December 2020
15:00 UTC−5

Ayacucho	1–4	Sporting Cristal
Solis 9' (o.g.)	Report	Olivares 36'; Herrera 47'; Corozo 50'; Liza 81'

Estadio Monumental, Lima
Attendance: 0
Referee: Diego Haro

Sporting Cristal won 6–2 on aggregate and advanced to the finals.

=== Finals ===
==== First leg ====
16 December 2020
19:00 UTC−5

Universitario	1–2	Sporting Cristal
Quintero 66'	Report	Chávez 26'; Cazulo 52'

Estadio Nacional, Lima
Attendance: 0
Referee: Joel Alarcón

==== Second leg ====
20 December 2020
15:00 UTC−5

Sporting Cristal	1–1	Universitario
Alfageme 69' (o.g.)	Report	Quintero 50'

Estadio Nacional, Lima
Attendance: 0
Referee: Víctor Hugo Carrillo

Sporting Cristal won 3–2 on aggregate.

== Top goalscorers ==
Rank	Name	Club	Goals
1	(Argentina) Emanuel Herrera	Sporting Cristal	20
2	(Colombia) Yorleys Mena	Universidad César Vallejo	19
3	(Argentina) Danilo Carando	Cusco	14
3	(Armenia) Mauro Guevgeozián	UTC	14
3	(Argentina) Sebastián Penco	Sport Boys	14
6	(Peru) Alejandro Hohberg	Universitario	13
6	(Mexico) Othoniel Arce	Melgar	13
8	(Uruguay) Jonathan Dos Santos	Universitario	12
9	(Colombia) Jefferson Collazos	Atlético Grau	11
9	(Peru) Matías Succar	Deportivo Municipal	11

Source: Soccerway

== Liga 1 awards ==
On 1 February 2021, the Liga 1 announced the nominees for the 2020 Liga 1 awards. The award ceremony, originally scheduled for 5 February 2021, 12:00 local time (UTC−5), was held on 15 February 2021, 20:00 local time. The winners were chosen based on voting by coaches and captains of 2020 Liga 1 teams, 50 local sports journalist and Liga 1 fans weighted as follows:

- Votes from 2020 Liga 1 coaches: 35%
- Votes from 2020 Liga 1 teams captains: 35%
- Votes from local sports journalists: 20%
- Votes from fans on social media: 10%

Award	Winner	Club	Nominees	Club
Best player of the year	(Argentina) Emanuel Herrera	Sporting Cristal	(Peru) Alejandro Hohberg	Universitario
Best player of the year	(Argentina) Emanuel Herrera	Sporting Cristal	(Colombia) Yorleys Mena	Universidad César Vallejo
Best goalkeeper	(Uruguay) Diego Melián	Deportivo Municipal	(Peru) José Carvallo	Universitario
Best goalkeeper	(Uruguay) Diego Melián	Deportivo Municipal	(Peru) Manuel Heredia	Carlos A. Mannucci
Newcomer Player	(Peru) Álex Valera	Deportivo Llacuabamba	(Peru) Matías Succar	Deportivo Municipal
Newcomer Player	(Peru) Álex Valera	Deportivo Llacuabamba	(Peru) Erinson Ramírez	UTC
Best under-21 player	(Peru) Yuriel Celi	Academia Cantolao	(Peru) Stalin Morillo	Universidad César Vallejo
Best under-21 player	(Peru) Yuriel Celi	Academia Cantolao	(Peru) Paolo Reyna	Melgar
Best Coach	(Peru) Roberto Mosquera	Sporting Cristal	(Argentina) Gerardo Ameli	Ayacucho
Best Coach	(Peru) Roberto Mosquera	Sporting Cristal	(Argentina) Ángel Comizzo	Universitario
Best Coach	(Peru) Roberto Mosquera	Sporting Cristal	(Peru) Franco Navarro	UTC
Best Coach	(Peru) Roberto Mosquera	Sporting Cristal	(Peru) Wilmar Valencia	Sport Huancayo
Goal of the Year	(Argentina) Diego Manicero (against Universidad San Martín, Torneo Apertura)	Carlos Stein	(Peru) Joazhiño Arroé (against Deportivo Municipal, Torneo Apertura)	Alianza Lima
Goal of the Year	(Argentina) Diego Manicero (against Universidad San Martín, Torneo Apertura)	Carlos Stein	(Uruguay) Gonzalo Rizzo (against Sporting Cristal, Torneo Apertura)	Carlos A. Mannucci
Goal of the Year	(Argentina) Diego Manicero (against Universidad San Martín, Torneo Apertura)	Carlos Stein	(Peru) Áxel Sánchez (against Sporting Cristal, Torneo Apertura)	Atlético Grau
Goal of the Year	(Argentina) Diego Manicero (against Universidad San Martín, Torneo Apertura)	Carlos Stein	(Colombia) Lionard Pajoy (against Alianza Lima, Torneo Apertura)	Alianza Universidad

The following awards were also awarded:

- Top goalscorer: (Argentina) Emanuel Herrera from Sporting Cristal (20 goals).
- Fair Play award: UTC (ranked first in the Fair Play standings with 915 points).

=== Best XI ===
The best XI team of the 2020 Liga 1 season was also announced during the award ceremony.

Goalkeeper	Defenders	Midfielders	Forwards
(Uruguay) Diego Melián (MUN)	(Peru) Alexis Cossio (AYA) (Argentina) Omar Merlo (CRI) (Peru) Gianfranco Chávez (CRI) (Peru) Josué Estrada (UTC)	(Ecuador) Washington Corozo (CRI) (Peru) Martín Távara (CRI) (Peru) Horacio Calcaterra (CRI) (Peru) Alejandro Hohberg (UNI)	(Colombia) Yorleys Mena (UCV) (Argentina) Emanuel Herrera (CRI)

== See also ==
- 2020 Torneo de Promoción y Reserva
- 2020 Liga 2
- 2020 in Peruvian football
