= Carlos Reyna =

Peruvian footballer (born 1959)

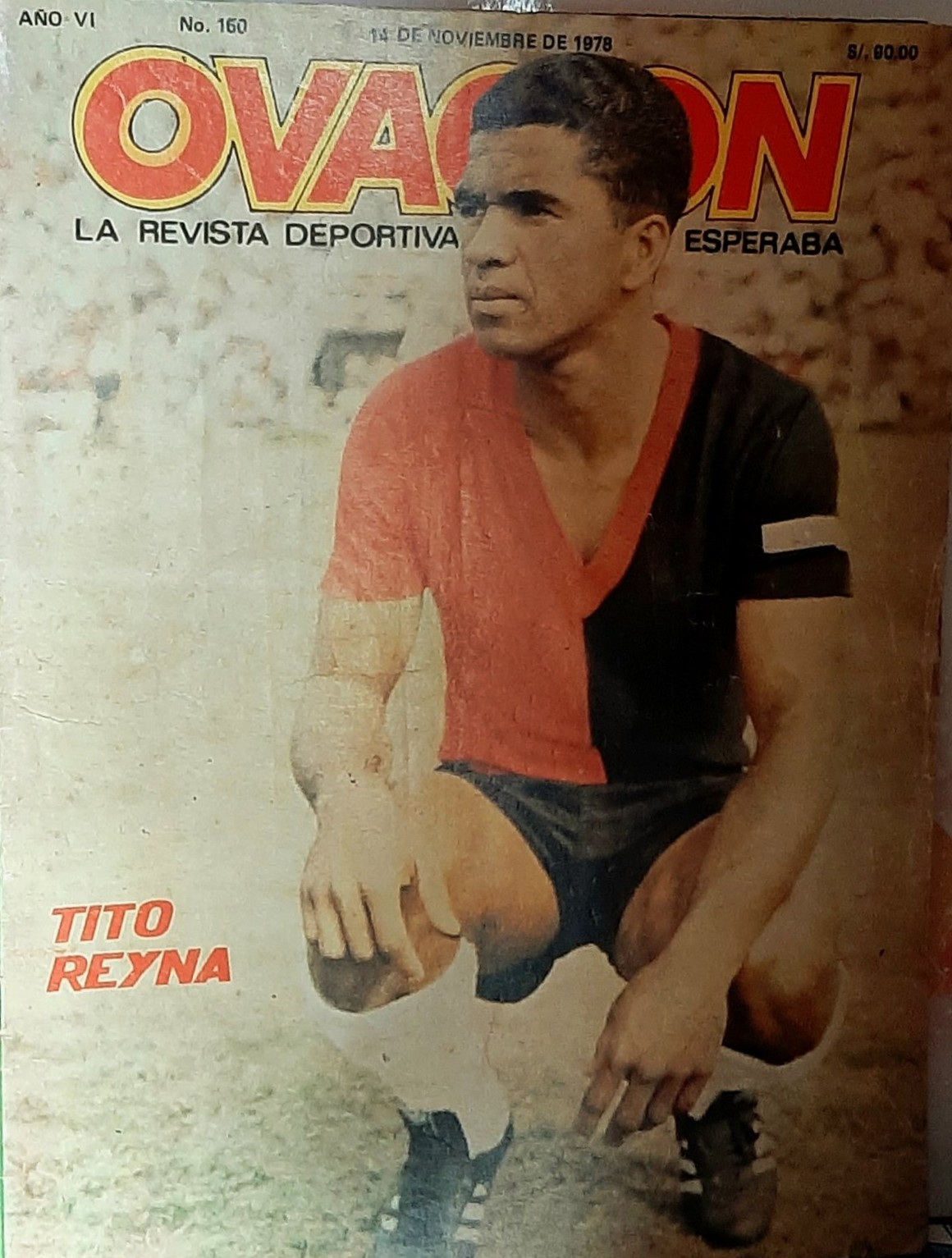
- Reyna in 1978

Personal information
- Full name: Carlos Roberto Reyna Gómez
- Date of birth: 25 January 1953 (age 73)
- Place of birth: Tacna, Department of Tacna, Peru
- Height: 1.84 m (6 ft 0 in)
- Positions: Defender; midfielder

Senior career*
Years	Team	Apps	(Gls)
1971–1972	Coronel Bolognesi		
1973–1979	Melgar		
1980–1982	Coronel Bolognesi		
1983	Atlético Torino		
1984–1987	Coronel Bolognesi		

International career
1977	Peru		
- * Club domestic league appearances and goals

Carlos Roberto Reyna Gómez (born 25 January 1953) is a retired Peruvian footballer. Nicknamed "Tito", he played as a defender and midfielder for Coronel Bolognesi, Melgar and Atlético Torino throughout the 1970s and the 1980s.

== Club career ==
Reyna began playing for Coronel Bolognesi for the 1971 Copa Perú where he would repeatedly come back to. Following an additional season to where the club would fail to classify for the final stage of the tournament, he signed for Melgar for their 1973 season initially on loan before deciding to stay in the club. He would enjoy substantially more success there as throughout his entire tenure in the 1970s. Throughout this era, he played alongside other players such as Miguel Ángel Canzani, Emilio Barra and Pablo Muchotrigo. He played a great role in the club's 4th-place result in the 1975 Torneo Descentralizado as well as helping them escape relegation for the 1979 Torneo Descentralizado. In 1976, he briefly returned to Bologniesi to help win the 1976 Copa Perú alongside players such as José Campos, José "Camote" Vásquez and Jaime Espinoza. He then returned to Bolognesi which had found itself promoted to the Torneo Descentralizado and played three additional seasons for the club before being loaned to Atlético Torino, a club that was recently promoted from the 1982 Copa Perú. He would spend the remainder of his career with Bolognesi until his retirement in the 1987 Torneo Descentralizado as a player-manager.

== International career ==
Reyna was called up as part of the preliminary Peru roster for the upcoming 1978 FIFA World Cup after they qualified for the tournament. Despite this, he did not make the final 23-man squad.

== Personal life ==
Reyna's son, Miguel, played for Melgar in 2004 and 2005. His grandson, Paolo Reyna also played for the Rojinegros from 2019 to 2024.
