= Alfageme =

Alfageme is a surname. Notable people with the surname include:

- Armando Alfageme (born 1990), Peruvian footballer
- Luis Maria Alfageme (born 1984), Argentine footballer
