= Diego Campos =

Diego Campos may refer to:

- Diego Campos (Mexican footballer) (born 1985), Mexican football forward
- Diego Campos (Costa Rican footballer) (born 1995), Costa Rican football forward
- Diego Campos (Peruvian footballer) (born 1996), Peruvian football goalkeeper
