= 2020 Sporting Cristal season =

Football league season

Sporting Cristal
2020 season
- President: Federico Cúneo
- Stadium: Alberto Gallardo, Lima
- Liga 1: Fase 1: Third (3°); Fase 2: First (1°) (Group A); Final Fase 2 Aggregate Table: First (1°) Champions; Final National: Champions; Champions National (1°)
- Copa Bicentenario: Suspended for COVID-19
- Copa Libertadores: Second stage
Home colours	Away colours	Third colours

The 2020 Sporting Cristal season were the Sixty-Fifth (65.º) of the club from its foundation in 1955, Sixty-Five (65) participations consecutives in the top-flight of Peruvian Primera División (of 104 Editions) with denomination last Liga 1. In Previous Season the club qualified as 3rd Place of the 2019 Liga 1.

Sporting Cristal were a of twenty (20) clubs in the Second edition (2.º) Liga 1, the competition most important of the Peruvian football. The club played the Peruvian Primera División and Copa Libertadores for Thirty-Fifth (35th) Time. Sporting Cristal won their 20th Torneo Descentralizado Title.

== Liga 1 ==
=== Fase 1 ===
Pos	Team	Pld	W	D	L	GF	GA	GD	Pts
2	Sport Huancayo	19	10	5	4	23	15	+8	35
3	Sporting Cristal	19	9	6	4	38	23	+15	33
3	Univ. César Vallejo	19	8	9	2	25	16	+9	33

== See also ==
- Club Sporting Cristal
- 2019 Liga 1
