= Juan Hohberg =

Uruguayan footballer and coach (1926-1996)

Personal information
- Full name: Juan Eduardo Hohberg Roca
- Date of birth: 8 October 1926
- Place of birth: Córdoba, Argentina
- Date of death: 30 April 1996 (aged 69)
- Place of death: Lima, Peru
- Position: Striker

Senior career*
Years	Team	Apps	(Gls)
1946	Central Córdoba	7	(2)
1947–1948	Rosario Central	51	(31)
1949–1960	Peñarol	130	(95)
1960	Racing Montevideo	6	(3)
1961	Cúcuta Deportivo	37	(19)
Total		231	(150)

International career
1954–1959	Uruguay	8	(3)

Managerial career
- 1962–1963: Cúcuta Deportivo
- 1964–1966: Atlético Nacional
- 1968: Panathinaikos
- 1969–1970: Uruguay
- 1971: Peñarol
- 1972: Sport Boys
- 1973: San Luis
- 1974–1975: Universitario
- 1977: Uruguay
- 1977–1979: Alianza Lima
- 1981: Ecuador
- 1981–1982: Emelec
- 1982: Juan Aurich
- 1983: Deportivo Municipal
- 1985: Sport Boys
- 1988: Liga de Quito
- 1991–1992: Deportivo Municipal
- * Club domestic league appearances and goals

Juan Eduardo Hohberg Roca (8 October 1926 – 30 April 1996) was an Argentine-born Uruguayan football player and coach. He is best remembered as a player for Peñarol (1949–60) where he won 6 Uruguayan Primera División title wins (1949, 1951, 1953, 1954, 1958, 1959) and 1960 and for playing for Uruguay at the 1954 FIFA World Cup - where Uruguay finished 4th. He was also Manager (coach) of Uruguay at the 1970 World Cup - they finished 4th

He is the grandfather of Peruvian footballer Alejandro Hohberg.

== Club career ==
Hohberg started his playing career in 1946 with Central Córdoba before joining Rosario Central in 1947.

In 1948 Hohberg moved to Uruguay to join Peñarol where he would play until 1959. Peñarol won six league titles during his time with the club.

Towards the end of his playing career he had spells with Racing Club de Montevideo and Cúcuta Deportivo in Colombia.

== International career ==
Hohberg scored three goals as a forward for the Uruguay national football team in the 1954 FIFA World Cup in Switzerland, including two in one of the most exciting World Cup matches ever played, the semi-final with Hungary. His second goal in the 86th minute of that match sent the game into extra time, where Hungary finally prevailed 4–2 after two goals by Sándor Kocsis.

== Coaching career ==
Hohberg was Uruguay's coach at the 1970 FIFA World Cup in Mexico, leading them to a fourth-place finish.

In Peru, he coached Universitario de Deportes winning the Peruvian championship in 1974, and Alianza Lima who won the title in 1977 and 1978. Also, was trainer of Deportivo Municipal.

== Personal life ==
The Peruvian footballer Alejandro Hohberg is his grandson.

== Career statistics ==
=== International ===
Appearances and goals by national team and year
National team	Year	Apps	Goals
Uruguay	1954	5	3
Uruguay	1955	0	0
Uruguay	1956	2	0
Uruguay	1957	0	0
Uruguay	1958	0	0
Uruguay	1959	1	0
Total		8	3

Scores and results list Uruguay's goal tally first, score column indicates score after each Hohberg goal.

List of international goals scored by Juan Hohberg
No.	Date	Venue	Opponent	Score	Result	Competition
1	30 June 1954	Stade Olympique de la Pontaise, Lausanne, Switzerland	Hungary	1–2	2–4	1954 FIFA World Cup
2	30 June 1954	Stade Olympique de la Pontaise, Lausanne, Switzerland	Hungary	2–2	2–4	1954 FIFA World Cup
3	3 July 1954	Hardturm, Zürich, Switzerland	Austria	1–1	1–3	1954 FIFA World Cup
