= 1973 FBC Melgar season =

FBC Melgar
1973 season
- Stadium: Estadio Mariano Melgar
- Torneo Descentralizado: First Stage: Third (3°); Liguilla Final: Sixth (6°); Sixth National (6°)
Home colours	Away colours	Third colours

The 1973 FBC Melgar season was the club's 59th season since its foundation in 1915. Four (4) participations in the top-flight of Peruvian Primera División (of 57 Editions) with denomination Torneo Descentralizado. In Previous Season the club qualified as 10th Place of the 1972 Torneo Descentralizado.

Melgar were one of eighteen (18) clubs in the Eighth edition (8.º) Torneo Descentralizado, the competition most important of the Peruvian football. The club played the Peruvian Primera División for Fourth (4th) Time.

== Torneo Descentralizado ==
=== First stage ===
Pos	Team	Pld	W	D	L	GF	GA	GD	Pts
2	Universitario	34	17	10	7	58	34	+24	44
3	FBC Melgar	34	17	9	8	53	25	+28	43
4	Defensor Lima	34	13	16	5	46	28	+18	42

== See also ==
- FBC Melgar
- 1973 Torneo Descentralizado
