= Carlos Ramacciotti =

Argentine football manager

Personal information
- Full name: Carlos Alberto Ramacciotti
- Date of birth: 29 May 1955 (age 71)
- Place of birth: Rosario, Argentina
- Position: Defender

Youth career
- Newell's Old Boys

Senior career*
Years	Team	Apps	(Gls)
1973–1974	Newell's Old Boys		
1974	Godoy Cruz		
1975	Atlético Ledesma		
1976–1981	Central Norte		
1982–1983	Renato Cesarini	9	(0)

Managerial career
- 1984–1988: Renato Cesarini
- 1988–1991: Central Córdoba Rosario
- 1991–1992: Belgrano
- 1992–1993: Gimnasia La Plata
- 1996: Deportivo Cuenca
- 1998–1999: Aldosivi
- 1999–2000: Independiente Rivadavia
- 2000: Blooming
- 2001: El Nacional
- 2001: Belgrano
- 2002–2003: Gimnasia La Plata
- 2004: Lanús
- 2005–2006: Belgrano
- 2007: Nueva Chicago
- 2007–2008: Gimnasia Jujuy
- 2009–2010: Defensa y Justicia
- 2011–2012: Oriente Petrolero
- 2012–2013: San Martín de Tucumán
- 2014: Sportivo Belgrano
- 2015: León de Huánuco
- 2016: Juventud Unida Universitario
- 2019: Sport Huancayo
- 2020: Cusco
- 2020–2021: Cusco
- 2023–2024: UTC
- * Club domestic league appearances and goals

Carlos Alberto Ramacciotti (born 29 May 1955) is an Argentine football manager and former player who played as a defender.

== Career ==
Ramacciotti was born in Rosario, and finished his formation with Newell's Old Boys. After making his first team debut in 1973, he went on to represent Godoy Cruz, Atlético Ledesma, Central Norte and Renato Cesarini.

Ramacciotti retired with Cesarini in 1983, and was immediately appointed manager of the club for the 1984 season. He moved to Central Córdoba de Rosario in 1988, and helped the club to achieve promotion to the Primera B Nacional in 1991.

In November 1992, Ramacciotti was appointed Gimnasia y Esgrima La Plata, along with Edgardo Sbrissa. He left in December 1993, and moved abroad in 1996 with Deportivo Cuenca.

After a short period at Club América, Ramacciotti was named manager of Aldosivi back in his homeland in 1998. He was also in charge of Independiente Rivadavia in the following year, before moving abroad again with Blooming in 2000.

In 2001, after a spell in charge of El Nacional in Ecuador, Ramacciotti was appointed manager of Belgrano. He returned to Gimnasia in December of that year, and left in 2003 before taking over Lanús in March 2004.

Ramacciotti returned to Belgrano in 2005, and was in charge of the club during their promotion to the Primera División. In March 2007, he was appointed Nueva Chicago manager, and joined Gimnasia y Esgrima de Jujuy in November.

In November 2009, Ramacciotti was appointed manager of Defensa y Justicia. He left in September of the following year, and returned to Bolivia in June 2011 to take over Oriente Petrolero.

Ramacciotti was dismissed in February 2012, and took over San Martín de Tucumán in June. He was relieved of his duties on 8 February 2013, and was named at the helm of Sportivo Belgrano in April 2014.

On 10 June 2015, Ramacciotti was presented as manager of Peruvian side León de Huánuco, but was dismissed in October. He was named in charge of Juventud Unida Universitario back in his home country on 14 March 2016, but rescinded his contract in June after the club's relegation.

On 31 March 2019, after nearly three years without a club, Ramacciotti returned to Peru and was appointed Sport Huancayo manager. He left in November, and took over fellow league team Cusco FC the following 5 March.

Ramacciotti left Cusco on a mutual agreement on 9 September 2020, but was again named manager of the club nearly one month later. He left the club in April 2021, and remained more than two years without a club before taking over UTC on 26 July 2023.

Ramacciotti was sacked from UTC on 6 August 2024.
