= Kevin Sandoval (Peruvian footballer) =

Peruvian footballer (born 1997)

Personal information
- Full name: Kevin Armando Sandoval Laynes
- Date of birth: 3 May 1997 (age 29)
- Place of birth: Chiclayo, Peru
- Height: 1.75 m (5 ft 9 in)
- Position: Winger

Team information
- Current team: Deportivo Garcilaso
- Number: 10

Youth career
- Sporting Cristal

Senior career*
Years	Team	Apps	(Gls)
2017–2020	Sporting Cristal	43	(5)
2017–2019	→ Ayacucho (loan)	58	(9)
2021–2023	Cienciano	80	(18)
2024	Melgar	12	(1)
2025-	Deportivo Garcilaso	34	(6)

International career
2019–2020	Peru U23	10	(2)
- * Club domestic league appearances and goals as of 30 December 2025

Kevin Armando Sandoval Laynes (born 3 May 1997) is a Peruvian professional footballer who plays as a winger for Peruvian Primera División club Deportivo Garcilaso.

== Club career ==
Sandoval made his professional debut on 11 March 2017 in Ayacucho's 1–0 defeat against Sport Rosario. He scored his first goal on 6 April 2018 in a 2–3 defeat against Comerciantes Unidos.

== International career ==
Sandoval was part of Peru under-23 team which played in 2020 CONMEBOL Pre-Olympic Tournament.

On 28 August 2020, Sandoval was included in the senior team's preliminary squad for 2022 FIFA World Cup qualifying matches against Paraguay and Brazil.

== Career statistics ==
=== Club ===
As of 25 October 2024

Appearances and goals by club, season and competition
Club	Division	Season	League		National cup		Continental		Total	
Club	Division	Season	Apps	Goals	Apps	Goals	Apps	Goals	Apps	Goals
Ayacucho	Torneo Descentralizado	2017	8	0	—		—		8	0
Ayacucho	Torneo Descentralizado	2018	35	7	—		—		35	7
Ayacucho	Liga 1	2019	15	2	—		—		15	2
Ayacucho	Total		58	9	0	0	0	0	58	9
Sporting Cristal	Liga 1	2019	17	1	4	0	2	2	23	3
Sporting Cristal	Liga 1	2020	26	4	—		2	1	28	5
Sporting Cristal	Total		43	5	4	0	4	3	51	8
Cienciano	Liga 1	2021	25	4	1	0	—		26	4
Cienciano	Liga 1	2022	35	11	—		2	0	37	11
Cienciano	Liga 1	2023	20	3	—		1	0	21	3
Cienciano	Total		80	18	1	0	3	0	84	18
Melgar	Liga 1	2024	12	1	—		1	0	13	1
Career total			193	33	5	0	8	3	206	36
