= Diego Melián =

Uruguayan footballer (born 1991)

Personal information
- Full name: Diego Melián de León
- Date of birth: 4 November 1991 (age 35)
- Place of birth: Montevideo, Uruguay
- Height: 1.86 m (6 ft 1 in)
- Position: Goalkeeper

Team information
- Current team: Alianza Atlético
- Number: 1

Senior career*
Years	Team	Apps	(Gls)
–2014	Danubio	0	(0)
2013–2014	→ Huracán (loan)	1	(0)
2014–2019	Racing Club	64	(0)
2020–2023	Deportivo Municipal	88	(0)
2023–	Alianza Atlético	95	(0)
- * Club domestic league appearances and goals as of 30 December 2025

Diego Melián de León (born 4 November 1991) is a Uruguayan footballer who plays as a goalkeeper for Alianza Atlético in the Peruvian Primera División.
