= Erick Morillo (footballer) =

Peruvian footballer (2000–2023)

Personal information
- Full name: Erick Stalin Morillo Calderón
- Date of birth: 19 February 2000
- Place of birth: Trujillo, Peru
- Date of death: 30 September 2023 (aged 23)
- Place of death: Peru
- Height: 1.76 m (5 ft 9 in)
- Position: Right-back

Youth career
- César Vallejo

Senior career*
Years	Team	Apps	(Gls)
2018–2023	César Vallejo	69	(13)
2023	→ Cantolao (loan)	4	(6)
- * Club domestic league appearances and goals

Erick Stalin Morillo Calderón (19 February 2000 – 30 September 2023) was a Peruvian footballer who played as a right-back.

== Career ==
Morillo was a product of the César Vallejo football club and made his official and professional debut for the club on 3 June 2018 against Juan Aurich in the Peruvian Segunda División. He made a total of two appearances for César Vallejo in the 2018 season, helping the team with promotion to the Peruvian Primera División.

In the 2019 season, Morillo only made one league appearance. In the 2020 season, he got his breakthrough and became a regular starter for the team, making 25 league appearances throughout the season.

In July 2023, Morillo moved to Cantolao on a loan deal for the rest of 2023.

== Death ==
Morillo was killed in a traffic accident on 30 September 2023. He was 23.
