= Alejandro Hohberg =

Peruvian footballer (born 1991)

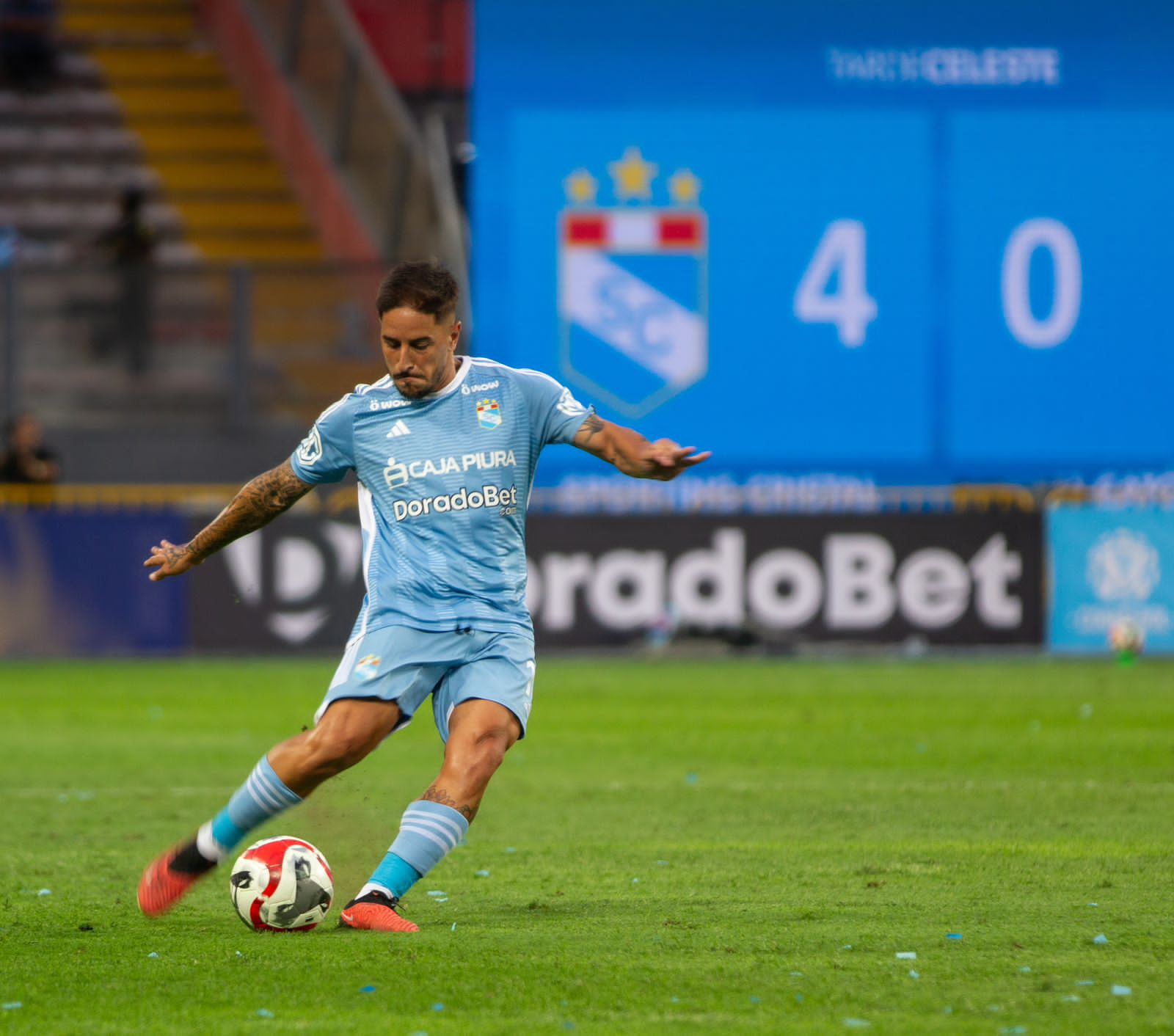

Personal information
- Full name: Alejandro Hohberg González
- Date of birth: 20 August 1991 (age 35)
- Place of birth: Lima, Peru
- Height: 1.69 m (5 ft 7 in)
- Position: Midfielder

Team information
- Current team: Cienciano
- Number: 10

Senior career*
Years	Team	Apps	(Gls)
2011–2012	Rentistas	8	(0)
2013–2014	CA Torque	9	(0)
2014	FBC Melgar	13	(2)
2015–2016	USMP	26	(5)
2016–2017	UCV	31	(10)
2017–2018	Alianza Lima	82	(16)
2019–2020	Universitario	60	(21)
2021–2024	Sporting Cristal	98	(30)
2025	Sport Boys	18	(9)
2025–	Cienciano	28	(14)

International career^{‡}
2016–2019	Peru	4	(0)
- * Club domestic league appearances and goals as of 30 December 2025 ‡ National team caps and goals as of 29 September 2024

Alejandro Hohberg González (born 20 August 1991) is a Peruvian professional footballer who plays as a midfielder for Liga 1 club Cienciano.

Hohberg is considered to be an important player in Peruvian domestic football, having played for some of the biggest clubs in Peru; including the 3 Lima giants - Universitario, Alianza Lima and Sporting Cristal.

His honours include the 2017 Torneo Apertura and Clausura and the 2017 Torneo Descentralizado Title with Alianza Lima, 2020 Apertura title, with Universitario, the 2021 Torneo Apertura title and the 2021 Copa Bicentenario with Sporting Cristal.

Hohberg has played for the Peru national team, and was part of their squad for the Copa América Centenario. He is the grandson of Argentinian- born Uruguayan footballer Juan Hohberg, who played for Peñarol and played for Uruguay at the 1954 World Cup in Switzerland.

== International career ==
Hohberg debuted for the Peru national football team in a friendly 4–0 win against Trinidad and Tobago. He was also part of the Peru squad in the Copa América Centenario.

== Personal life ==
He is a grandson of Uruguay's former footballer Juan Hohberg, and he was born in Lima.

He was available to represent Uruguay national football team due to his Uruguayan background from his grandfather. However, he chose to represent for Peru, the country of his birth.

== Honours ==
Sporting Cristal

- Torneo Apertura 2021
- Copa Bicentenario: 2021

Universitario de Deportes

- Torneo Apertura 2020

Alianza Lima

- Peruvian Primera División: 2017
