= Diego Campos (Peruvian footballer) =

Peruvian footballer (born 1996)

Personal information
- Full name: Diego Nelson Campos Huamán
- Date of birth: 28 May 1996 (age 30)
- Place of birth: Lima, Peru
- Height: 1.89 m (6 ft 2 in)
- Position: Goalkeeper

Team information
- Current team: UTC
- Number: 21

Youth career
- –2014: Alianza Lima

Senior career*
Years	Team	Apps	(Gls)
2015–2019	Melgar	41	(0)
2019	→ Real Garcilaso (loan)	0	(0)
2020	Chavelines Juniors	10	(0)
2021	Deportivo Llacuabamba	8	(0)
2022	Juan Aurich	9	(0)
2023–2024	Comerciantes Unidos	47	(0)
2025–	UTC	32	(0)
- * Club domestic league appearances and goals as of 30 December 2025

Diego Nelson Campos Huamán (born 28 May 1996) is a Peruvian footballer who plays as a goalkeeper for UTC.

== Club career ==
18-year old Campos moved to FBC Melgar in 2015 after a good season with Alianza Lima's reserve team. Campos played for Melgar's reserve team in his first season. He got his official debut in the Peruvian Segunda División for Melgar against Universidad San Martín on 10 July 2016. In his second season, he played 11 games, while he played 21 in the following season and 9 in the 2018 season.

In January 2019, Campos was loaned out to Real Garcilaso for the rest of the year. However, he wasn't able to make a single appearance for the team and was only on the bench for three times in the Peruvian Primera División.

On 28 February 2020, Campos joined Peruvian Segunda División side Chavelines Juniors. He left the club at the end of the year.

== Career statistics ==
=== Club ===
As of match played on 30 December 2025.

Club	Division	Season	League		Cup		Continental		Total	
Club	Division	Season	Apps	Goals	Apps	Goals	Apps	Goals	Apps	Goals
Melgar	Torneo Descentralizado	2016	11	0	-		-		11	0
Melgar	Torneo Descentralizado	2017	21	0	-		-		21	0
Melgar	Torneo Descentralizado	2018	9	0	-		-		9	0
Melgar	Total		41	0	-		-		41	0
Real Garcilaso	Liga 1	2019	-		1	0	-		1	0
Chavelines Juniors	Liga 2	2020	10	0	-		-		10	0
Deportivo Llacuabamba	Liga 2	2021	8	0	2	0	-		10	0
Juan Aurich	Liga 2	2022	9	0	0	0	-		9	0
Comerciantes Unidos	Liga 2	2023	22	0	0	0	-		22	0
Comerciantes Unidos	Liga 1	2024	25	0	0	0	0	0	25	0
Comerciantes Unidos	Total		47	0	0	0	-		47	0
UTC	Liga 1	2025	32	0	0	0	0	0	32	0
Career total			147	0	3	0	0	0	150	0
