= Gustavo Collante =

Argentine professional footballer

Personal information
- Full name: Gustavo Javier Collante
- Date of birth: 19 May 1997 (age 29)
- Place of birth: Juan Bautista Alberdi, Argentina
- Height: 1.72 m (5 ft 8 in)
- Position: Midfielder

Team information
- Current team: Juan Pablo II College
- Number: 24

Youth career
- Boca Juniors

Senior career*
Years	Team	Apps	(Gls)
2018	Leandro N. Alem	0	(0)
2018–2019	Deportivo Español	27	(0)
2019–	Juan Aurich	12	(1)
- * Club domestic league appearances and goals as of 21:27, 9 December 2019 (UTC)

Gustavo Javier Collante (born 19 May 1997) is an Argentine professional footballer who plays as a midfielder for Juan Pablo II College.

== Career ==
Collante is a product of the Boca Juniors youth system. In June 2018, Collante completed a move to Primera C Metropolitana's Leandro N. Alem. However, in the succeeding August, the midfielder terminated his contract to join Deportivo Español of Primera B Metropolitana. He made his bow under manager Adrián Romero in 2018–19, appearing for his professional debut on 2 September during a 2–0 win over San Miguel. A further twenty-six appearances arrived in a campaign which concluded with relegation.

== Career statistics ==
As of 25 May 2019.

Appearances and goals by club, season and competition
Club	Season	League			Cup		League Cup		Continental		Other		Total	
Club	Season	Division	Apps	Goals	Apps	Goals	Apps	Goals	Apps	Goals	Apps	Goals	Apps	Goals
Leandro N. Alem	2018–19	Primera C Metropolitana	0	0	0	0	—		—		0	0	0	0
Deportivo Español	2018–19	Primera B Metropolitana	27	0	0	0	—		—		0	0	27	0
Career total			27	0	0	0	—		—		0	0	27	0
