= Jonathan dos Santos (Uruguayan footballer) =

Uruguayan footballer (born 1992)

Personal information
- Full name: Jonathan David dos Santos Duré
- Date of birth: 18 April 1992 (age 34)
- Place of birth: Salto, Uruguay
- Height: 1.78 m (5 ft 10 in)
- Position: Forward

Team information
- Current team: Progreso
- Number: 25

Youth career
- Salto Nuevo FC

Senior career*
| Years | Team | Apps | (Gls) |
| 2015–2016 | Cerro Largo | 21 | (11) |
| 2016–2018 | Danubio | 41 | (6) |
| 2017–2018 | → Atlético San Luis (loan) | 15 | (2) |
| 2019–2020 | Cerro Largo | 32 | (13) |
| 2020 | → Universitario (loan) | 28 | (15) |
| 2021–2022 | Querétaro | 22 | (4) |
| 2023 | River Plate Montevideo | 23 | (7) |
| 2024 | Mushuc Runa | 14 | (9) |
| 2024 | Everton | 7 | (0) |
| 2025 | CA Artigas | 9 | (2) |
| 2025 | → Mushuc Runa (loan) | 17 | (5) |
| 2026– | Progreso | 10 | (1) |
- * Club domestic league appearances and goals as of 9 August 2024

Jonathan David Dos Santos Duré (born 18 April 1992) is a Uruguayan professional footballer who plays as a forward for Progreso.

== Career ==
Dos Santos returned to Cerro Largo for the 2019 season. He scored 13 goals in 32 league games for the club in his first season. At the end of December 2019 it was confirmed, that dos Santos would play for Peruvian side Universitario on loan for the 2020 season.

In the second half of 2024, Dos Santos moved to Chile and joined Everton from Mushuc Runa.

== Honours ==
Universitario de Deportes

- Torneo Apertura 2020
