= Armando Alfageme =

Peruvian footballer (born 1990)

Personal information
- Full name: Armando André Alfageme Palacios
- Date of birth: 3 November 1990 (age 36)
- Place of birth: San Borja, Peru
- Position: Midfielder

Team information
- Current team: Club Deportivo Pacífico FC
- Number: 6

Senior career*
Years	Team	Apps	(Gls)
2009–2012	Universitario	2	(0)
2013	UTC Cajamarca	23	(0)
2014–2018	Deportivo Municipal	170	(3)
2019–2022	Universitario	80	(0)
2023–2024	ADT Tarma	45	(0)
2024	Juan Pablo II College	4	(0)
2024–2025	Moquegua	6	(0)
2025–2026	USMP	6	(0)
2026	Cultural Volante	4	(0)
2026–	Club Deportivo Pacífico FC	2	(0)

International career^{‡}
2016–	Peru	2	(0)
- * Club domestic league appearances and goals as of 11 March 2026 ‡ National team caps and goals as of 29 May 2016

Armando André Alfageme Palacios (Spanish pronunciation: [aɾˈman.do al.faˈxe.me]; born 3 November 1990) is a Peruvian professional footballer who plays as a midfielder for Liga 3 club Club Deportivo Pacífico FC.

== Career ==
=== Early career ===
Alfageme began his career with Universitario, making his debut on 6 December 2009 against Melgar. He started the match and Universitario lost 5–0. He soon moved to UTC Cajamarca, making his debut for them on 24 February 2013 against Ayacucho in a Primera División match. He came on as an 80th-minute substitute for Víctor Guazá Lucumí as UTC Cajamarca won 3–1.

=== Deportivo Municipal ===
After a season with UTC Cajamarca Alfageme signed with Peruvian Segunda División side, Deportivo Municipal. He made his debut for the side on 27 April 2014 against Sport Victoria. He came on as an 88th-minute substitute for Óscar Vega as Deportivo Municipal drew the match 1–1. He scored his first professional goal of his career on 31 August 2014 in a Segunda División match against Willy Serrato. His 49th-minute goal to give Municipal the lead however was not enough as Serrato came back to equalize in the 69th minute and draw the match 1–1. After Deportivo Municipal earned promotion to the Primera División, Alfageme scored his first first division goal on 16 May 2015 against Sport Huancayo. He scored the first goal in a six-goal encounter that ended 3–3.

== International ==
In May 2016, Alfageme was selected into the Peru 23-man squad for the Copa América Centenario. He made his international debut for the country on 23 May 2016 against Trinidad and Tobago in a friendly. He came on as a 70th-minute substitute for Alejandro Hohberg as Peru went on to win 4–0.

== Career statistics ==
=== Club ===
As of match played 8 October 2023

Club	Division	League			National cup		Continental		Total	
Club	Division	Season	Apps	Goals	Apps	Goals	Apps	Goals	Apps	Goals
Universitario	Torneo Descentralizado	2009	1	0	—		—		1	0
Universitario	Torneo Descentralizado	2010	—		—		—		—	
Universitario	Torneo Descentralizado	2011	1	0	—		—		1	0
Real Garcilaso	Torneo Descentralizado	2012	—		—		—		—	
UTC Cajamarca	Torneo Descentralizado	2013	23	0	—		—		23	0
Deportivo Municipal	Segunda División	2014	28	1	—		—		28	1
Deportivo Municipal	Torneo Descentralizado	2015	30	1	8	0	—		38	1
Deportivo Municipal	Torneo Descentralizado	2016	39	0	—		2	0	41	0
Deportivo Municipal	Torneo Descentralizado	2017	37	0	—		2	0	39	0
Deportivo Municipal	Torneo Descentralizado	2018	36	1	—		—		36	1
Deportivo Municipal	Total		170	3	8	0	4	0	182	3
Universitario	Liga 1	2019	28	0	2	0	—		30	0
Universitario	Liga 1	2020	22	0	—		3	0	25	0
Universitario	Liga 1	2021	22	0	1	0	6	0	29	0
Universitario	Liga 1	2022	8	0	—		1	0	9	0
Universitario	Total		82	0	3	0	10	0	95	0
ADT Tarma	Liga 1	2022	16	0	—		—		16	0
ADT Tarma	Liga 1	2023	29	0	—		—		29	0
ADT Tarma	Total		45	0	0	0	0	0	45	0
Career total			320	3	11	0	14	0	345	3

== Honours ==
Universitario de Deportes

- Torneo Descentralizado: 2009
- Torneo Apertura 2020

Deportivo Municipal

- Segunda División: 2014
