= Paolo Reyna =

Peruvian footballer (born 2001)

Personal information
- Full name: Paolo Alessandro Reyna Lea
- Date of birth: 13 October 2001 (age 25)
- Place of birth: Ciudad Nueva, Peru
- Height: 1.82 m (6 ft 0 in)
- Position: Left-back

Team information
- Current team: Universitario de Deportes
- Number: 14

Youth career
- 2013: Orcas FBC
- 2014–2015: Leoncio Prado
- 2016: Mariscal Cáceres de Calana
- 2016-2017: Coronel Bolognesi
- 2018: Deportivo Potrillos
- 2018–2019: Melgar

Senior career*
Years	Team	Apps	(Gls)
2017	Coronel Bolognesi	20	(3)
2019–2024	Melgar	131	(4)
2025–	Universitario de Deportes	15	(0)

International career^{‡}
2020	Peru U20	2	(0)
2022–	Peru	1	(0)
- * Club domestic league appearances and goals as of 05:00, 28 January 2022 (UTC) ‡ National team caps and goals as of 16:09, 23 March 2024 (UTC)

Paolo Alessandro Reyna Lea (born 13 October 2001) is a Peruvian footballer who plays as a left-back for Peruvian Liga 1 club Universitario de Deportes and the Peru national team.

== Career ==
Born in Tacna, Reyna arrived at the youth ranks of Coronel Bolognesi in 2016, later being promoted to the reserve team and making his debut with the first team in 2017. Following this, he was signed by FBC Melgar in 2018.

== Career statistics ==
=== Club ===
As of 3 November 2024.

Club	Division	League			Cup		Continental		Total	
Club	Division	Season	Apps	Goals	Apps	Goals	Apps	Goals	Apps	Goals
Coronel Bolognesi	Copa Perú	2017	30	3	—		—		30	3
Melgar	Liga 1	2019	11	0	0	0	0	0	11	0
Melgar	Liga 1	2020	18	0	—		2	0	20	0
Melgar	Liga 1	2021	21	1	1	0	7	0	29	1
Melgar	Liga 1	2022	37	2	—		13	0	50	2
Melgar	Liga 1	2023	13	0	—		4	0	17	0
Melgar	Liga 1	2024	27	1	—		0	0	27	1
Melgar	Total		127	4	1	0	26	0	154	4
Career total			157	7	1	0	26	0	184	7

== Honours ==
Universitario de Deportes

- Peruvian Primera División: 2025

FBC Melgar

- Torneo Apertura 2022
