= Franco León =

Peruvian footballer (born 1998)

Personal information
- Full name: Franco José León Genit
- Date of birth: 12 July 1998 (age 28)
- Place of birth: Lima, Peru
- Height: 1.84 m (6 ft 0 in)
- Position: Defensive midfielder

Youth career
- Alianza Lima
- 2016–2019: Deportivo Municipal

Senior career*
Years	Team	Apps	(Gls)
2017–2020	Deportivo Municipal	1	(0)
2019	→ UTC Cajamarca (loan)	6	(0)
2020	Juan Aurich	7	(1)
2021	Carlos Stein	2	(0)
2021	Juan Aurich	4	(0)
2022–2023	Lucera		
2023	Pirata	19	(0)
- * Club domestic league appearances and goals as of 18:10, 10 October 2023 (UTC)

Franco José León Genit (born 12 July 1998) is a Peruvian footballer who plays as a defensive midfielder.

== Club career ==
=== Early years ===
León is a product of Alianza Lima. In May 2015, he went on a trial at Hércules CF since he also had a European passport. The trial went well and he was offered to return in August. During the trial, León also played a friendly game for the club's B-team. However, he never officially signed for the club.

=== Deportivo Municipal ===
León joined Deportivo Municipal from Alianza Lima in 2016 and was later promoted to the club's reserve team, where he also became the captain. After good performances, he was called up for two Peruvian Primera División games in 2017, however, he remained on the bench in both games. He made his official debut on 25 November 2018 against Sport Huancayo.

In 2019, León was loaned out to UTC Cajamarca, where he made six appearances. He returned to Deportivo Municipal for the 2020 season.

=== Juan Aurich ===
In the summer 2020, León moved to Juan Aurich in the Peruvian Segunda División. With seven games played for the team, he left the club at the end of 2020.

=== Carlos Stein ===
In April 2021, León joined fellow second division club FC Carlos Stein.

=== Return to Juan Aurich ===
In August 2021 it was reported, that León had returned to Juan Aurich. He made a total of four appearances for the club.

=== Lucera Calcio ===
On 22 December 2021 it was confirmed, that León had signed with Italian Promozione club Lucera Calcio.

=== Pirata ===
After a year in Italy, León returned home to Peru, where he signed with Peruvian Segunda División side Pirata in March 2023.
