= Gianfranco Chávez =

Peruvian footballer (born 1998)

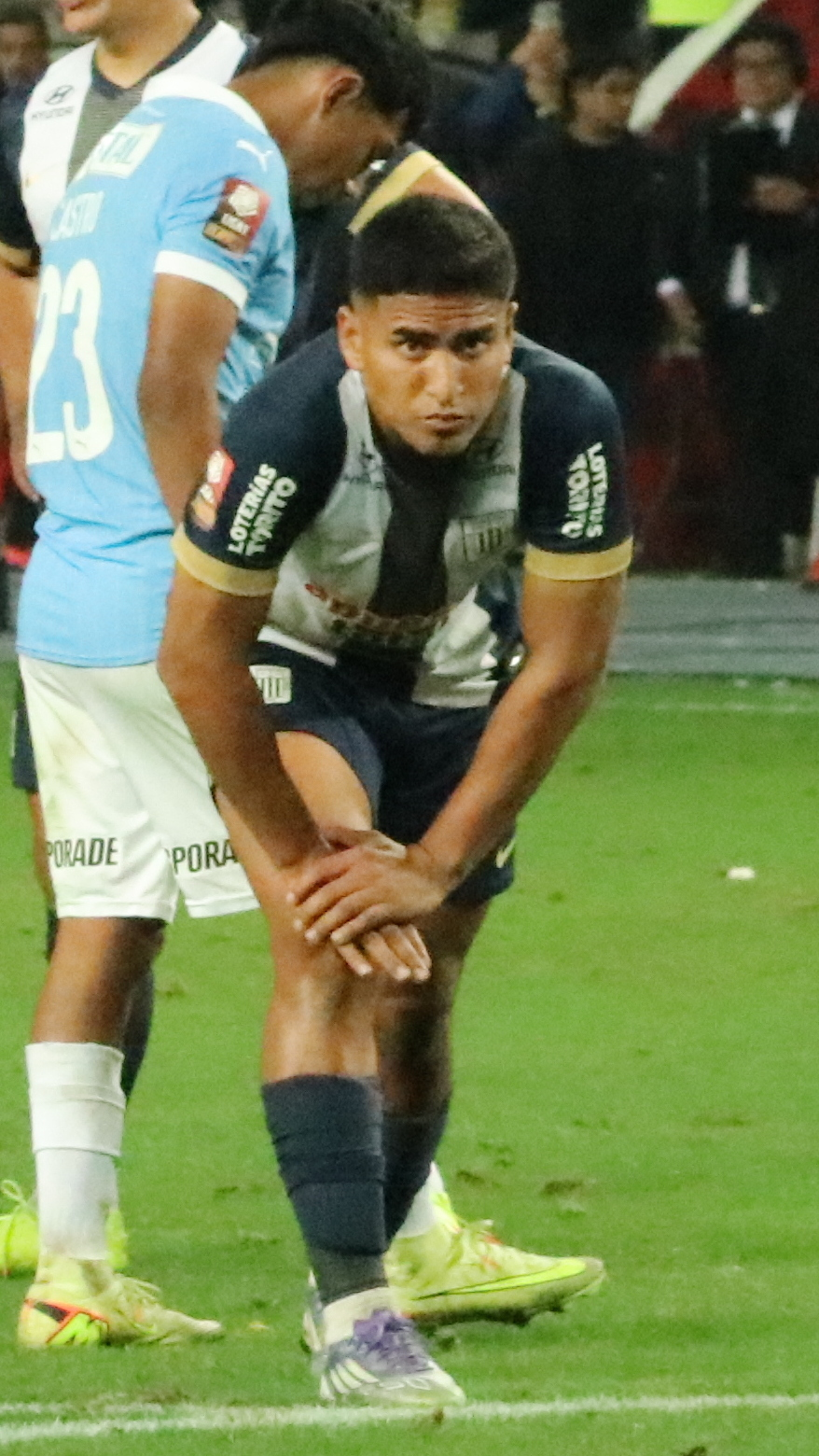

Personal information
- Full name: Gianfranco Chávez Massoni
- Date of birth: 10 August 1998 (age 28)
- Place of birth: Lima, Peru
- Height: 1.80 m (5 ft 11 in)
- Position: Defender

Team information
- Current team: Alianza Lima
- Number: 24

Youth career
- –2017: Sporting Cristal

Senior career*
Years	Team	Apps	(Gls)
2017–2025	Sporting Cristal	179	(7)
2018	→ Deportivo Coopsol (loan)	10	(2)
2025–	Alianza Lima	12	(0)

International career^{‡}
2016–2017	Peru U20	5	(0)
2020–	Peru U23	4	(0)
2022–	Peru	1	(0)
- * Club domestic league appearances and goals as of 29 December 2025 ‡ National team caps and goals as of 28 January 2022

Gianfranco Chávez Massoni (born 10 August 1998) is a Peruvian footballer who plays as a defender for Alianza Lima and the Peru national team.

== International career ==
Chávez made his debut for the Peru national team on 20 January 2022 in a 3–0 home win over Jamaica.

== Career statistics ==
=== Club ===
As of 13 July 2025.

Club	Season	League			Cup		Continental		Total	
Club	Season	Division	Apps	Goals	Apps	Goals	Apps	Goals	Apps	Goals
Sporting Cristal	2017	Liga 1	2	0	—		0	0	2	0
Sporting Cristal	2018	Liga 1	1	0	—		0	0	1	0
Sporting Cristal	2019	Liga 1	26	0	4	0	6	0	36	0
Sporting Cristal	2020	Liga 1	31	2	—		2	0	33	2
Sporting Cristal	2021	Liga 1	21	1	4	0	6	0	31	1
Sporting Cristal	2022	Liga 1	30	2	—		6	0	36	2
Sporting Cristal	2023	Liga 1	31	1	—		11	0	42	1
Sporting Cristal	2024	Liga 1	25	1	—		2	0	27	1
Sporting Cristal	2025	Liga 1	12	0	—		2	0	14	0
Sporting Cristal	Total		179	7	8	0	35	0	222	7
Deportivo Coopsol	2018	Liga 2	10	2	—		—		10	2
Career total			189	9	8	0	35	0	232	9
