= 2021 Liga 1 (Peru) =

Liga 1
- Season: 2021
- Dates: 12 March – 28 November 2021
- Champions: Alianza Lima (24th title)
- Relegated: Cusco; Alianza Universidad
- Copa Libertadores: Alianza Lima; Sporting Cristal; Universitario; Universidad César Vallejo
- Copa Sudamericana: Melgar; Cienciano; Sport Boys; Ayacucho
- Matches: 237
- Goals: 635 (2.68 per match)
- Top goalscorer: Luis Iberico; Felipe Rodríguez (12 goals each)
- Highest scoring: Cusco 3–5 Deportivo Municipal (18 October)

The 2021 Liga 1 de Fútbol Profesional (known as the Liga 1 Betsson 2021 for sponsorship reasons) was the 105th season of the Peruvian Primera División, the highest division of Peruvian football. A total of 18 teams competed in the season, with Sporting Cristal coming in as defending champions.

The season was originally scheduled to start on 26 February 2021, while the draw, which was originally scheduled to take place on 5 February 2021, was postponed due to the effects of the second wave of the COVID-19 pandemic in Peru. Because of this, the Peruvian Football Federation (FPF) also postponed the start of the tournament, with 12 March 2021 as the new date.

Alianza Lima were the champions, winning their twenty-fourth league title by defeating Sporting Cristal in the finals by a 1–0 aggregate score.

== Competition format ==
The format for this season was unveiled by the Liga de Fútbol Profesional on 16 January 2021. The season was divided into three stages: Fase 1, Fase 2, and the Playoffs. In Fase 1, the 18 teams were drawn into two groups of nine with the winners of each group playing a final to decide the Fase 1 winner, while Fase 2 was played under a single round-robin format with the 18 teams playing each other once.

The playoffs were to be contested by the winners of Fase 1 and Fase 2, as well as the top two teams of the aggregate table, which would play two semifinals with the winners playing the final to decide the national champion. If the Fase 1 or Fase 2 winners also ended up in the top two of the aggregate table, they would get a bye to the finals. However, in case a team won both stages of the competition, the playoffs would not be played and that team would be declared as champion. The bottom two teams of the aggregate table at the end of the season were relegated, with the team placed in 16th place playing a relegation playoff against the Liga 2 runners-up.

It was expected that, pending approval from the Peruvian government and health authorities, the competition would be played at the teams' respective home stadiums after health concerns by the COVID-19 pandemic caused the previous season to be concluded in Lima. However, the Fase 1 and later the Fase 2 were confirmed to be played entirely in the Peruvian capital, with the return of province teams to their home stadiums expected for 2022.

== Teams ==
18 teams played in the 2021 Liga 1 season. The top seventeen teams in the 2020 Liga 1 took part, along with the 2020 Liga 2 champions Alianza Atlético.

=== Team changes ===
Promoted from 2020 Liga 2	Relegated from 2020 Liga 1
▲ Alianza Atlético (1st)	▼ Atlético Grau (18th) ▼ Carlos Stein (19th) ▼ Deportivo Llacuabamba (20th)

=== Stadia and locations ===
Locations of the 2021 Liga 1 teams

Team	Manager	City	Stadium	Capacity
Academia Cantolao	(Peru) Carlos Silvestri	Callao	Miguel Grau	17,000
Alianza Atlético	(Argentina) Marcelo Vivas	Sullana	Campeones del 36	5,000
Alianza Lima	(Argentina) Carlos Bustos	Lima	Alejandro Villanueva	35,938
Alianza Universidad	(Peru) Julio César Uribe	Huánuco	Heraclio Tapia	25,000
Ayacucho	(Argentina) Walter Fiori	Ayacucho	Ciudad de Cumaná	15,000
Binacional	(Argentina) Carlos Desio	Juliaca	Guillermo Briceño Rosamedina	20,030
Carlos A. Mannucci	(Uruguay) Pablo Peirano	Trujillo	Mansiche	25,036
Cienciano	(Argentina) Gerardo Ameli	Cusco	Garcilaso	45,056
Cusco	(Argentina) Marcelo Grioni	Cusco	Garcilaso	45,056
Deportivo Municipal	(Argentina) Hernán Lisi	Lima	Iván Elías Moreno	10,000
Melgar	(Argentina) Néstor Lorenzo	Arequipa	Virgen de Chapi	60,370
Sport Boys	(Peru) Ytalo Manzo (caretaker)	Callao	Miguel Grau	17,000
Sport Huancayo	(Peru) Javier Arce	Huancayo	Estadio Huancayo	20,000
Sporting Cristal	(Peru) Roberto Mosquera	Lima	Alberto Gallardo	18,000
Universidad César Vallejo	(Peru) José del Solar	Trujillo	Mansiche	25,036
Universidad San Martín	(Peru) José Espinoza	Lima	Alberto Gallardo	18,000
Universitario	(Uruguay) Gregorio Pérez	Lima	Monumental	80,093
UTC	(Uruguay) Mario Viera	Cajamarca	Héroes de San Ramón	18,000

The following stadiums were used to host matches:

Stadium	City
Alberto Gallardo	Lima
Alejandro Villanueva	Lima
Iván Elías Moreno	Lima
Miguel Grau	Callao
Monumental	Lima
Nacional	Lima
Universidad San Marcos	Lima
Villa Deportiva Nacional	Lima

=== Managerial changes ===
Team	Outgoing manager	Manner of departure	Date of vacancy	Position in table	Incoming manager	Date of appointment
Fase 1
Melgar	(Peru) Marco Valencia	End of caretaker spell	30 November 2020	Pre-season	(Argentina) Néstor Lorenzo	16 December 2020
Alianza Lima	(Argentina) Daniel Ahmed	Sacked	2 December 2020	Pre-season	(Argentina) Carlos Bustos	15 January 2021
Deportivo Municipal	(Peru) Víctor Rivera	Resigned	2 December 2020	Pre-season	(Peru) Franco Navarro	3 December 2020
UTC	(Peru) Franco Navarro	Signed by Deportivo Municipal	3 December 2020	Pre-season	(Argentina) Pablo Garabello	4 December 2020
Ayacucho	(Argentina) Gerardo Ameli	End of contract	18 December 2020	Pre-season	(Argentina) Walter Fiori	18 December 2020
Universidad San Martín	(Venezuela) Héctor Bidoglio	Resigned	15 March 2021	Pre-season	(Peru) José Espinoza (caretaker)	15 March 2021
Binacional	(Peru) Luis Flores	Mutual consent	22 March 2021	9th, Group B	(Peru) César Chávez-Riva (Argentina) César Vaioli (caretakers)	22 March 2021
Universidad San Martín	(Peru) José Espinoza	End of caretaker spell	30 March 2021	4th, Group A	(Uruguay) César Payovich	30 March 2021
Binacional	(Peru) César Chávez-Riva (Argentina) César Vaioli	End of caretaker spell	14 April 2021	8th, Group B	(Argentina) Rubén Darío Insúa	14 April 2021
Cusco	(Argentina) Carlos Ramacciotti	Sacked	21 April 2021	7th, Group B	(Argentina) Claudio Vivas	22 April 2021
Sport Boys	(Peru) Teddy Cardama	Sacked	8 May 2021	6th, Group B	(Argentina) Gustavo Álvarez (Note: Juan Alayo was the interim manager for the Fase 1 8th round match against Alianza Lima.)	12 May 2021
Binacional	(Argentina) Rubén Darío Insúa	Mutual consent	8 May 2021	8th, Group B	(Argentina) César Vaioli (caretaker)	9 May 2021
UTC	(Argentina) Pablo Garabello	Mutual consent	25 May 2021	7th, Group A	(Uruguay) Mario Viera	26 May 2021
Fase 2
Binacional	(Argentina) César Vaioli	End of caretaker spell	21 May 2021	Pre-tournament	(Argentina) Carlos Desio	1 June 2021
Cienciano	(Argentina) Marcelo Grioni	Mutual consent	24 May 2021	Pre-tournament	(Peru) Víctor Rivera	1 June 2021
Alianza Universidad	(Peru) Rony Revollar	Resigned	11 June 2021	Pre-tournament	(Peru) Julio César Uribe	12 June 2021
Alianza Atlético	(Peru) Jahir Butrón	Mutual consent	5 August 2021	12th	(Peru) Teddy Cardama	6 August 2021
Sport Huancayo	(Peru) Wilmar Valencia	Sacked	7 August 2021	17th	(Peru) Javier Arce	7 August 2021
Cienciano	(Peru) Víctor Rivera	Sacked	14 August 2021	12th	(Argentina) Gerardo Ameli	15 August 2021
Universitario	(Argentina) Ángel Comizzo	Sacked	18 August 2021	7th	(Peru) Juan Pajuelo (caretaker)	19 August 2021
Cusco	(Argentina) Claudio Vivas	Sacked	19 August 2021	15th	(Argentina) Marcelo Grioni	20 August 2021
Alianza Atlético	(Peru) Teddy Cardama	Resigned	25 August 2021	17th	(Argentina) Marcelo Vivas	25 August 2021
Deportivo Municipal	(Peru) Franco Navarro	Mutual consent	26 August 2021	13th	(Peru) Julio Argote (caretaker)	27 August 2021
Universitario	(Peru) Juan Pajuelo	End of caretaker spell	1 September 2021	12th	(Uruguay) Gregorio Pérez	1 September 2021
Deportivo Municipal	(Peru) Julio Argote	End of caretaker spell	1 September 2021	11th	(Argentina) Hernán Lisi	1 September 2021
Sport Boys	(Argentina) Gustavo Álvarez	Mutual consent	1 September 2021	8th	(Peru) Ytalo Manzo (caretaker)	1 September 2021
Universidad San Martín	(Uruguay) César Payovich	Mutual consent	20 September 2021	18th	(Peru) José Espinoza	20 September 2021
Academia Cantolao	(Peru) Jorge Espejo	Mutual consent	28 September 2021	13th	(Peru) Carlos Silvestri	30 September 2021

== Fase 1 ==
=== Group A ===
Pos	Team	Pld	W	D	L	GF	GA	GD	Pts	Qualification
1	Universidad San Martín	9	6	1	2	10	6	+4	19	Advance to Fase 1 final
2	Ayacucho	9	3	6	0	16	10	+6	15	
3	Universitario	9	4	3	2	12	11	+1	15	
4	Cienciano	9	4	2	3	14	12	+2	14	
5	Carlos A. Mannucci	9	3	3	3	13	14	−1	12	
6	Alianza Atlético	9	3	1	5	10	9	+1	10	
7	UTC	9	3	1	5	9	12	−3	10	
8	Academia Cantolao	9	3	1	5	8	13	−5	10	
9	Melgar	9	2	3	4	11	12	−1	9	

Source: Liga 1, Soccerway
Rules for classification: 1) Points; 2) Goal difference; 3) Goals for; 4) Drawing of lots.

=== Group B ===
Pos	Team	Pld	W	D	L	GF	GA	GD	Pts	Qualification
1	Sporting Cristal	9	8	0	1	18	6	+12	24	Advance to Fase 1 final
2	Universidad César Vallejo	9	5	3	1	17	8	+9	18	
3	Alianza Lima	9	4	4	1	12	6	+6	16	
4	Sport Huancayo	9	3	3	3	8	9	−1	12	
5	Sport Boys	9	3	1	5	12	14	−2	10	
6	Alianza Universidad	9	3	1	5	8	13	−5	10	
7	Cusco	9	1	5	3	12	13	−1	8	
8	Deportivo Municipal	9	2	1	6	6	15	−9	7	
9	Binacional	9	1	1	7	8	21	−13	4	

Source: Liga 1, Soccerway
Rules for classification: 1) Points; 2) Goal difference; 3) Goals for; 4) Drawing of lots.

=== Results ===
Home \ Away	AAS	ALI	AUH	AYA	BIN	CAN	CAM	CIE	CUS	MUN	MEL	SBA	SHU	CRI	UCV	USM	UNI	UTC
Alianza Atlético		0–0		0–1		0–1											1–2	
Alianza Lima			2–0		2–0				2–2	1–0					2–2			
Alianza Universidad									1–0			1–0		0–3				1–2
Ayacucho								1–1					3–0			2–2	3–3	
Binacional			2–1								1–1			0–4	1–2			
Academia Cantolao				2–2				0–2				2–1					3–1	0–1
Carlos A. Mannucci	1–3			1–1		2–0					2–1					2–0		
Cienciano	1–0						5–2									0–1		1–0
Cusco					3–1			2–2				2–2	0–1	1–2				
Deportivo Municipal			1–0		2–1				1–1				0–1		0–4			
Melgar	1–3			0–0		3–0		3–0								0–2		
Sport Boys		0–2			3–2					3–1					2–3			
Sport Huancayo		0–0	3–3		3–0							0–1			0–0			
Sporting Cristal		2–1								3–1		1–0	2–0					
Universidad César Vallejo			0–1				2–1		1–1					3–0				
Universidad San Martín	2–1					1–0				1–0							0–1	
Universitario							0–0	3–2			1–1			0–1				1–0
UTC	0–2			1–3			2–2				3–1					0–1		

Source: Liga 1, Soccerway
Legend: Blue = home team win; Yellow = draw; Red = away team win.

=== Fase 1 final ===
30 May 2021
14:00

Sporting Cristal	2–0 (a.e.t.)	Universidad San Martín
Hohberg 94'; Riquelme 107' (pen.)	Report

Estadio Alejandro Villanueva, Lima
Attendance: 0
Referee: Kevin Ortega

== Fase 2 ==
=== Standings ===
Pos	Team	Pld	W	D	L	GF	GA	GD	Pts	Qualification
1	Alianza Lima	17	12	4	1	27	11	+16	40	Advance to Playoffs and qualification for Copa Libertadores
2	Sporting Cristal	17	10	4	3	39	23	+16	34	
3	Universitario	17	9	5	3	31	19	+12	32	
4	Melgar	17	9	4	4	34	15	+19	31	
5	Sport Boys	17	7	7	3	24	20	+4	28	
6	Cienciano	17	6	8	3	27	20	+7	26	
7	Deportivo Municipal	17	7	3	7	26	22	+4	24	
8	Universidad César Vallejo	17	6	6	5	14	12	+2	24	
9	Carlos A. Mannucci	17	7	3	7	27	26	+1	24	
10	UTC	17	6	5	6	19	21	−2	23	
11	Ayacucho	17	6	4	7	21	26	−5	22	
12	Binacional	17	6	3	8	24	29	−5	21	
13	Sport Huancayo	17	3	9	5	18	21	−3	18	
14	Academia Cantolao	17	4	5	8	20	24	−4	17	
15	Cusco	17	4	4	9	30	36	−6	16	
16	Alianza Atlético	17	4	3	10	21	37	−16	15	
17	Alianza Universidad	17	3	5	9	17	32	−15	14	
18	Universidad San Martín	17	1	4	12	8	33	−25	7	

Source: Liga 1, Soccerway
Rules for classification: 1) Points; 2) Goal difference; 3) Goals for; 4) Fair play points; 5) Drawing of lots.

=== Results ===
Home \ Away	AAS	ALI	AUH	AYA	BIN	CAN	CAM	CIE	CUS	MUN	MEL	SBA	SHU	CRI	UCV	USM	UNI	UTC
Alianza Atlético		1–3	1–2		0–3	3–1	2–0	2–2		0–2	3–3		1–0					
Alianza Lima				4–1	3–2	2–1				1–0	1–0		1–1	1–3				2–0
Alianza Universidad		0–0		1–2		0–3		1–1		0–3		2–0		1–2		1–1	0–4	
Ayacucho	0–1						3–2	1–3	1–3			1–2			2–1	1–0	1–1	
Binacional			1–1	3–1							1–5	1–2		3–4	0–0	1–0	1–2	1–0
Academia Cantolao				2–2	1–2					2–1	0–2	0–2	0–0	2–4				2–0
Carlos A. Mannucci		0–1	1–1		3–1	1–0		1–3		1–2	1–2		1–1					1–3
Cienciano		1–1			2–0	0–0				2–3	0–1		0–0	2–1				2–2
Cusco	3–0	0–2	2–3		2–2	3–2	2–3	2–2 (Note: The match had been awarded 3–0 to Cusco as Cienciano player Mathías Carpio was deemed to be ineligible. This ruling was overturned by the Court of Arbitration for Sport on 20 January 2022.)		3–5			2–1					
Deportivo Municipal				0–1	1–2						1–3	0–1	2–2	1–1		2–0		1–1
Melgar			3–0	1–1					2–2			1–0		0–1	1–1	6–0	1–2	0–1
Sport Boys	3–1	0–0					3–3	1–4	3–2						2–2	2–0	0–0	
Sport Huancayo			4–3	1–1	2–0						0–3	1–1		1–2		3–1	1–3	0–0
Sporting Cristal	5–2			1–0			1–3		4–1			1–1			0–1	1–1	2–2	
Universidad César Vallejo	2–0	0–1	3–1			0–0	0–1	0–1	1–0	2–0			0–0					
Universidad San Martín	3–1	0–2				0–2	0–2	1–1	1–1						0–1		0–2	
Universitario	2–2	1–2				2–2	1–3	3–1	2–1	0–2					3–0			
UTC	3–1		1–0	0–2					2–1			1–1		1–6	0–0	4–0	0–1	

Source: Liga 1, Soccerway
Legend: Blue = home team win; Yellow = draw; Red = away team win.

== Aggregate table ==
Pos	Team	Pld	W	D	L	GF	GA	GD	Pts	Qualification or relegation
1	Sporting Cristal	26	18	4	4	57	29	+28	58	Advance to Playoffs and qualification for Copa Libertadores group stage
2	Alianza Lima (C)	26	16	8	2	39	17	+22	56	Advance to Playoffs and qualification for Copa Libertadores group stage
3	Universitario (Note: Universitario was deducted two points, and Cusco, Universidad San Martín, Cienciano, Sport Boys, Alianza Universidad, and Deportivo Municipal were all deducted one point as punishment for failing to pay debts.)	26	13	8	5	43	30	+13	45	Qualification for Copa Libertadores second stage
4	Universidad César Vallejo	26	11	9	6	31	20	+11	42	Qualification for Copa Libertadores first stage
5	Melgar	26	11	7	8	45	27	+18	40	Qualification for Copa Sudamericana first stage (Note: Since the winners of the 2021 Copa Bicentenario, Sporting Cristal, qualified for South American competition based on league performance, the Copa Sudamericana first stage berth allocated to the Copa Bicentenario winners was transferred to the aggregate table best placed team not yet qualified for international competition.)
6	Cienciano	26	10	10	6	41	32	+9	39	Qualification for Copa Sudamericana first stage
7	Sport Boys	26	10	8	8	36	34	+2	37	Qualification for Copa Sudamericana first stage
8	Ayacucho	26	9	10	7	37	36	+1	37	Qualification for Copa Sudamericana first stage
9	Carlos A. Mannucci	26	10	6	10	40	40	0	36	
10	UTC	26	9	6	11	28	33	−5	33	
11	Sport Huancayo	26	6	12	8	26	30	−4	30	
12	Deportivo Municipal	26	9	4	13	32	37	−5	30	
13	Academia Cantolao	26	7	6	13	28	37	−9	27	
14	Alianza Atlético	26	7	4	15	31	46	−15	25	
15	Binacional	26	7	4	15	32	50	−18	25	
16	Universidad San Martín	26	7	5	14	18	39	−21	25	Qualification for Relegation playoff
17	Cusco (R)	26	5	9	12	42	49	−7	23	Relegation to Liga 2
18	Alianza Universidad (R)	26	6	6	14	25	45	−20	23	Relegation to Liga 2

Source: Liga 1
Rules for classification: 1) Points; 2) Goal difference; 3) Goals for; 4) Fair play points; 5) Drawing of lots.
(C) Champions; (R) Relegated

== Playoffs ==
Semi-finals	Finals
	Alianza Lima	1	0	1
	Sporting Cristal	0	0	0

=== Finals ===
==== First leg ====
21 November 2021
15:00

Alianza Lima	1–0	Sporting Cristal
Barcos 33'	Report

Estadio Nacional, Lima
Referee: Diego Haro

==== Second leg ====
28 November 2021
15:00

Sporting Cristal	0–0	Alianza Lima
	Report

Estadio Nacional, Lima
Referee: Kevin Ortega

Alianza Lima won 1–0 on aggregate.

== Relegation playoff ==
The relegation playoff was originally played by Binacional, as the team placed 16th in the Liga 1 aggregate table and the Liga 2 Revalidación winners Carlos Stein, with Carlos Stein winning on penalties after a 1–1 draw on aggregate. However, on 20 January 2022 the Court of Arbitration for Sport overturned a ruling by the FPF in which Cusco were awarded a 3–0 win in their Fase 2 match against Cienciano which had originally ended in a 2–2 draw. Due to this, Cusco fell to 17th place in the aggregate table and were relegated to Liga 2, while Binacional moved up one place to 15th and were reinstated in Liga 1.

On 21 January 2022, the FPF confirmed that they would abide by the CAS ruling and also ruled out a replay of the relegation playoff series, this time between Carlos Stein and Universidad San Martín who went up to 16th place in the aggregate table as an effect of this ruling, with which Universidad San Martín also avoided relegation whilst Carlos Stein's promotion was confirmed.

4 November 2021
15:00

Carlos Stein	0–1	Binacional
	Report	Arango 55'

Estadio Monumental, Lima
Referee: Michael Espinoza
7 November 2021
15:00

Binacional	0–1	Carlos Stein
	Report	Freitas 77'
Penalties
Mancilla (penalty scored); Caraza (penalty missed); Polar (penalty scored); Rosell (penalty missed)	2–4	(penalty scored) Salas; (penalty scored) Freitas; (penalty missed) Ramírez; (penalty scored) Quiñones; (penalty scored) López

Estadio Monumental, Lima
Referee: Edwin Ordóñez

Tied 1–1 on aggregate, Carlos Stein won on penalties and were promoted to Liga 1.

== Top scorers ==
Rank	Name	Club	Goals
1	(Peru) Luis Iberico	Melgar	12
1	(Uruguay) Felipe Rodríguez	Carlos A. Mannucci	12
3	(Argentina) Alexis Blanco	UTC	11
3	(Uruguay) Gabriel Leyes	Academia Cantolao	11
3	(Colombia) Víctor Perlaza	Alianza Atlético	11
3	(Peru) Alex Valera	Universitario	11
3	(Peru) Joao Villamarín	Sport Boys	11
8	(Argentina) Hernán Barcos	Alianza Lima	10
8	(Ecuador) Marlon de Jesús	Binacional	10

== Liga 1 awards ==
On 9 December 2021, the Liga 1 announced the nominees for the 2021 Liga 1 awards. The award ceremony was held on 15 December 2021, 18:00 local time (UTC−5), at the Peruvian Football Federation headquarters. The winners were chosen based on voting by coaches and captains of 2021 Liga 1 teams, local sports journalist and Liga 1 fans on social media.

Award	Winner	Club	Nominees	Club
Best player of the year	(Argentina) Hernán Barcos	Alianza Lima	(Peru) Christofer Gonzáles	Sporting Cristal
Best player of the year	(Argentina) Hernán Barcos	Alianza Lima	(Peru) Josepmir Ballón	Alianza Lima
Best goalkeeper	(Peru) Ángelo Campos	Alianza Lima	(Peru) José Carvallo	Universitario
Best goalkeeper	(Peru) Ángelo Campos	Alianza Lima	(Peru) Alejandro Duarte	Sporting Cristal
Best under-20 player	(Peru) Jesús Castillo	Sporting Cristal	(Peru) Jostin Alarcón	Sport Boys
Best under-20 player	(Peru) Jesús Castillo	Sporting Cristal	(Peru) Arón Sánchez	Academia Cantolao
Best Coach	(Argentina) Carlos Bustos	Alianza Lima	(Peru) Roberto Mosquera	Sporting Cristal
Best Coach	(Argentina) Carlos Bustos	Alianza Lima	(Peru) José del Solar	Universidad César Vallejo
Goal of the Year	(Peru) Erinson Ramírez (against Sporting Cristal, Fase 1)	Deportivo Municipal	(Uruguay) Felipe Rodríguez (against Universidad San Martín, Fase 1)	Carlos A. Mannucci
Goal of the Year	(Peru) Erinson Ramírez (against Sporting Cristal, Fase 1)	Deportivo Municipal	(Argentina) Gaspar Gentile (against Melgar, Fase 1)	UTC
Goal of the Year	(Peru) Erinson Ramírez (against Sporting Cristal, Fase 1)	Deportivo Municipal	(Peru) Kevin Quevedo (against Carlos A. Mannucci, Fase 2)	Melgar
Goal of the Year	(Peru) Erinson Ramírez (against Sporting Cristal, Fase 1)	Deportivo Municipal	(Peru) Piero Ratto (against Cienciano, Fase 2)	Deportivo Municipal
Goal of the Year	(Peru) Erinson Ramírez (against Sporting Cristal, Fase 1)	Deportivo Municipal	(Peru) Raziel García (against Alianza Atlético, Fase 2)	Cienciano

The following awards were also awarded:

- Top goalscorers: Two winners, both with 12 goals.
  - (Peru) Luis Iberico from Melgar.
  - (Uruguay) Felipe Rodríguez from Carlos A. Mannucci.
- Fair Play award: Alianza Lima (ranked first in the Fair Play standings).

=== Best XI ===
The best XI team of the 2021 Liga 1 season was also announced during the award ceremony.

Goalkeeper	Defenders	Midfielders	Forwards
(Peru) Ángelo Campos (Alianza Lima)	(Peru) Ricardo Lagos (Alianza Lima) (Peru) Renzo Garcés (U. César Vallejo) (Uruguay) Pablo Míguez (Alianza Lima) (Peru) Jhilmar Lora (Sporting Cristal)	(Peru) Christofer Gonzáles (Sporting Cristal) (Peru) Josepmir Ballón (Alianza Lima) (Peru) Raziel García (Cienciano)	(Peru) Luis Iberico (Melgar) (Argentina) Hernán Barcos (Alianza Lima) (Uruguay) Felipe Rodríguez (Carlos A. Mannucci)

== See also ==
- 2021 Copa Bicentenario
- 2021 Liga 2
- 2021 Copa Perú
- 2021 Copa Generación
- 2021 in Peruvian football
