= 2022 Liga 1 (Peru) =

Liga 1
- Season: 2022
- Dates: 4 February – 12 November 2022
- Champions: Alianza Lima (25th title)
- Relegated: Universidad San Martín; Carlos Stein; Ayacucho
- Copa Libertadores: Alianza Lima; Melgar; Sporting Cristal; Sport Huancayo
- Copa Sudamericana: Universitario; Universidad César Vallejo; Cienciano; Binacional
- Matches: 346
- Goals: 937 (2.71 per match)
- Top goalscorer: Luis Benítes (19 goals)
- Biggest home win: Binacional 5–0 Academia Cantolao (14 February); Ayacucho 5–0 U. San Martín (26 February); Cienciano 5–0 Alianza Atlético (9 April); Alianza Lima 5–0 U. San Martín (26 September)
- Biggest away win: U. San Martín 0–4 Universitario (16 July); U. San Martín 1–5 UTC (18 September)
- Highest scoring: Sporting Cristal 6–4 Municipal (16 April)

The 2022 Liga 1 de Fútbol Profesional (known as the Liga 1 Betsson 2022 for sponsorship reasons) was the 106th season of the Peruvian Primera División, the highest division of Peruvian football. A total of 19 teams competed in the season, which began on 4 February and ended on 12 November 2022. The season was originally scheduled to start on 21 January 2022, but the date was pushed back due to the detection of several COVID-19 cases in the participating clubs.

Defending champions Alianza Lima won their twenty-fifth league championship in this season, defeating Melgar in the finals after losing the first leg 1–0 and winning the second leg 2–0, for a 2–1 score on aggregate.

== Competition format ==
The season was divided into three stages: Torneo Apertura, Torneo Clausura, and the Playoffs. Both Apertura and Clausura tournaments were played under a single round-robin format with the 19 teams playing each other once. The winners of the Apertura and Clausura stages qualified for the playoffs, as long as they ended the season in the top eight of the aggregate table, along with the top two teams on the aggregate table at the end of the season.

The four teams qualified for the playoffs were to play two double-legged semifinals with the winners playing the finals to decide the national champion, unless any of the following conditions is met:

1. If one of the Apertura or Clausura tournament winners also ended up in the top two of the aggregate table, they would get a bye to the finals and the remaining two teams would play a semifinal to decide the other finalist.
2. If both Apertura and Clausura tournament winners ended up placing in the top two of the aggregate table, the semifinals would not be played and both teams would get a bye to the finals.
3. If one team won both the Apertura and Clausura tournaments, the playoffs would not be played and that team would be declared as champion.

The bottom two teams of the aggregate table at the end of the season were relegated, while the 17th placed team of the aggregate table played the Liga 2 runner-up in a double-legged playoff (Revalidación) to remain in Liga 1.

== Teams ==
Originally, 18 teams were slated to play in the 2022 Liga 1 season. The top fifteen teams in the 2021 Liga 1 would take part, along with the 2021 Liga 2 champions Atlético Grau, the 2021 Copa Perú champions ADT, and the Revalidación winners Carlos Stein.

On 20 January 2022 Binacional, who had originally placed 16th in the 2021 Liga 1 aggregate table and were relegated following their defeat to Carlos Stein in the Revalidación, were reinstated in the competition due to a ruling by the Court of Arbitration for Sport which overturned a 3–0 win awarded to Cusco in their Fase 2 match against Cienciano. Due to this, Binacional moved up to 15th place in the aggregate table and Cusco fell to 17th place and were relegated.

On 21 January 2022, the FPF confirmed that they would abide by the CAS ruling and also ruled out a replay of the Revalidación series, this time between Carlos Stein and Universidad San Martín who went up to 16th place in the 2021 Liga 1 aggregate table as an effect of this ruling, with which Universidad San Martín also avoided relegation whilst Carlos Stein's promotion was confirmed, meaning that the league would be contested by 19 teams.

=== Team changes ===
Promoted from 2021 Liga 2	Promoted from 2021 Copa Perú	Relegated from 2021 Liga 1
▲ Atlético Grau (1st) ▲ Carlos Stein (2nd)	▲ADT (1st)	▼ Cusco (17th) ▼ Alianza Universidad (18th)

=== Stadia and locations ===
Locations of the 2022 Liga 1 teams

Team	Manager	City	Stadium	Capacity
Academia Cantolao	(Uruguay) Alejandro Apud	Callao	Miguel Grau	17,000
ADT	(Peru) Franco Navarro	Tarma	Unión Tarma	9,100
Alianza Atlético	(Uruguay) Mario Viera	Sullana	Campeones del 36	12,000
Alianza Lima	(Peru) Guillermo Salas (caretaker)	Lima	Alejandro Villanueva	35,938
Atlético Grau	(Argentina) Gustavo Álvarez	Piura	Municipal de Bernal	7,000
Ayacucho	(Colombia) Édgar Ospina	Ayacucho	Ciudad de Cumaná	15,000
Binacional	(Peru) Wilmar Valencia	Juliaca	Guillermo Briceño Rosamedina	20,030
Carlos A. Mannucci	(Argentina) Jorge Pautasso	Trujillo	Mansiche	25,036
Carlos Stein	(Peru) Javier Arce	Jaén	Víctor Montoya Segura	9,000
Cienciano	(Peru) Jesús Cisneros (caretaker)	Cusco	Garcilaso	45,056
Deportivo Municipal	(Peru) Juan Pajuelo	Lima	Iván Elías Moreno	10,000
Melgar	(Argentina) Pablo Lavallén	Arequipa	Virgen de Chapi	40,370
Sport Boys	(Peru) Juan Alayo	Callao	Miguel Grau	17,000
Sport Huancayo	(Peru) Mifflin Bermúdez	Huancayo	Huancayo	20,000
Sporting Cristal	(Peru) Roberto Mosquera	Lima	Alberto Gallardo	11,600
Universidad César Vallejo	(Peru) José del Solar	Trujillo	Mansiche	25,036
Universidad San Martín	(Peru) Orlando Lavalle	Lima	Universidad San Marcos	32,000
Universitario	(Argentina) Carlos Compagnucci	Lima	Monumental	80,093
UTC	(Argentina) Marcelo Grioni	Cajamarca	Héroes de San Ramón	18,000

=== Managerial changes ===
Team	Outgoing manager	Manner of departure	Date of vacancy	Position in table	Incoming manager	Date of appointment
Torneo Apertura
Universidad San Martín	(Peru) José Espinoza	End of caretaker spell	30 October 2021	Pre-season	(Argentina) Juan Luvera	27 January 2022
Alianza Atlético	(Argentina) Marcelo Vivas	End of contract	30 October 2021	Pre-season	(Uruguay) Mario Viera	13 November 2021
Ayacucho	(Argentina) Walter Fiori	End of contract	30 October 2021	Pre-season	(Uruguay) Alejandro Apud	27 November 2021
Sport Huancayo	(Peru) Javier Arce	End of contract	30 October 2021	Pre-season	(Argentina) Carlos Desio	3 December 2021
Carlos A. Mannucci	(Uruguay) Pablo Peirano	End of contract	6 November 2021	Pre-season	(Mexico) Enrique Meza Jr.	7 November 2021
Atlético Grau	(Peru) Jesús Oropesa	End of contract	9 November 2021	Pre-season	(Argentina) Gustavo Álvarez	9 November 2021
UTC	(Uruguay) Mario Viera	End of contract	1 December 2021	Pre-season	(Peru) Franco Navarro	26 November 2021
Binacional	(Argentina) Carlos Desio	Signed by Sport Huancayo	3 December 2021	Pre-season	(Peru) Wilmar Valencia	26 January 2022
Universitario	(Uruguay) Gregorio Pérez	Resigned	21 January 2022	Pre-season	(Uruguay) Edgardo Adinolfi (Note: Caretaker manager.)	21 January 2022
Universitario	(Uruguay) Edgardo Adinolfi	Mutual agreement	3 February 2022	Pre-season	(Uruguay) Álvaro Gutiérrez (Note: Manuel Barreto was the caretaker manager for the Torneo Apertura 1st round match against Cantolao.)	3 February 2022
Sport Boys	(Peru) Ytalo Manzo	Mutual agreement	26 February 2022	17th	(Peru) Juan Alayo	26 February 2022
Sport Boys	(Peru) Juan Alayo	End of caretaker spell	5 March 2022	12th	(Argentina) Walter Fiori	4 March 2022
Carlos A. Mannucci	(Mexico) Enrique Meza Jr.	Mutual agreement	7 March 2022	19th	(Uruguay) Mario Saralegui	8 March 2022
Universidad San Martín	(Argentina) Juan Luvera	Mutual agreement	5 April 2022	19th	(Peru) Víctor Rivera	6 April 2022
Carlos Stein	(Peru) Jahir Butrón	Mutual agreement	8 April 2022	16th	(Uruguay) Tabaré Silva	11 April 2022
Sport Boys	(Argentina) Walter Fiori	Mutual agreement	11 April 2022	18th	(Peru) Juan Alayo (Note: Originally as caretaker manager, appointed on a permanent basis on 3 May 2022.)	11 April 2022
Universitario	(Uruguay) Álvaro Gutiérrez	Mutual agreement	18 April 2022	6th	(Peru) Jorge Araujo	18 April 2022
UTC	(Peru) Franco Navarro	Sacked	27 April 2022	15th	(Argentina) Marcelo Grioni	28 April 2022
Ayacucho	(Uruguay) Alejandro Apud	Sacked	28 May 2022	18th	(Argentina) Marcelo Vivas	9 June 2022
Academia Cantolao	(Peru) Carlos Silvestri	Mutual agreement	2 June 2022	19th	(Peru) Guillermo Esteves	18 June 2022
Universitario	(Peru) Jorge Araujo	End of caretaker spell	16 June 2022	7th	(Argentina) Carlos Compagnucci	16 June 2022
ADT	(Peru) Juan Carlos Bazalar	Mutual agreement	27 June 2022	15th	(Peru) Franco Navarro (Note: Carlos Gutiérrez was the caretaker manager for the Torneo Apertura 19th round match against Alianza Lima.)	27 June 2022
Academia Cantolao	(Peru) Guillermo Esteves	End of caretaker spell	2 July 2022	16th	(Uruguay) Alejandro Apud	2 July 2022
Cienciano	(Argentina) Gerardo Ameli	Resigned	2 July 2022	4th	(Argentina) César Vigevani	2 July 2022
Torneo Clausura
Melgar	(Argentina) Néstor Lorenzo	Signed by Colombia	6 July 2022	Pre-tournament	(Argentina) Pablo Lavallén	3 July 2022
Carlos A. Mannucci	(Uruguay) Mario Saralegui	Sacked	28 July 2022	19th	(Argentina) Jorge Pautasso	29 July 2022
Ayacucho	(Argentina) Marcelo Vivas	Sacked	8 August 2022	17th	(Colombia) Édgar Ospina	8 August 2022
Sport Huancayo	(Argentina) Carlos Desio	Sacked	9 August 2022	14th	(Peru) Mifflin Bermúdez (Note: Originally as caretaker manager, appointed on a permanent basis on 25 August 2022.)	9 August 2022
Carlos Stein	(Uruguay) Tabaré Silva	Sacked	5 September 2022	17th	(Peru) Daniel Valderrama	5 September 2022
Alianza Lima	(Argentina) Carlos Bustos	Mutual agreement	11 September 2022	5th	(Peru) Guillermo Salas	11 September 2022
Deportivo Municipal	(Argentina) Hernán Lisi	Mutual agreement	12 September 2022	14th	(Peru) Juan Pajuelo	13 September 2022
Carlos Stein	(Peru) Daniel Valderrama	End of caretaker spell	12 September 2022	18th	(Peru) Javier Arce	12 September 2022
Universidad San Martín	(Peru) Víctor Rivera	Sacked	19 September 2022	19th	(Peru) Orlando Lavalle	19 September 2022
Cienciano	(Argentina) César Vigevani	Mutual agreement	20 October 2022	13th	(Peru) Jesús Cisneros (Note: Caretaker manager until the end of the season.)	21 October 2022

== Torneo Apertura ==
=== Standings ===
Pos	Team	Pld	W	D	L	GF	GA	GD	Pts	Qualification
1	Melgar	18	13	2	3	23	11	+12	41	Advance to the Playoffs
2	Sport Huancayo	18	12	4	2	35	18	+17	40	
3	Sporting Cristal	18	11	5	2	35	20	+15	38	
4	Alianza Lima	18	10	3	5	28	16	+12	33	
5	Cienciano	18	9	5	4	37	22	+15	32	
6	Binacional	18	10	1	7	24	19	+5	31	
7	Universidad César Vallejo	18	8	6	4	25	15	+10	30	
8	Alianza Atlético	18	9	3	6	26	27	−1	30	
9	Universitario	18	8	4	6	24	19	+5	28	
10	Deportivo Municipal	18	7	4	7	30	36	−6	25	
11	UTC	18	6	2	10	29	32	−3	20	
12	Carlos A. Mannucci	18	5	5	8	19	22	−3	20	
13	Atlético Grau	18	4	6	8	20	23	−3	18	
14	Sport Boys	18	5	3	10	17	32	−15	18	
15	ADT	18	3	7	8	14	24	−10	16	
16	Academia Cantolao	18	4	3	11	18	32	−14	15	
17	Universidad San Martín	18	4	3	11	21	37	−16	15	
18	Carlos Stein	18	3	5	10	18	31	−13	14	
19	Ayacucho	18	3	3	12	25	32	−7	12	

Source: Liga 1, Soccerway
Rules for classification: 1) Points; 2) Goal difference; 3) Goals for; 4) Fair play points; 5) Drawing of lots.

=== Results ===
Home \ Away	ADT	AAS	ALI	CAG	AYA	BIN	CAN	CAM	STE	CIE	MUN	MEL	SBA	SHU	CRI	UCV	USM	UNI	UTC
ADT		1–2	1–1		0–0						2–3		3–0	1–0	1–1	0–0			1–2
Alianza Atlético			4–2		2–1	2–0		0–0			2–2	0–0	1–2				3–1		1–0
Alianza Lima				1–1	2–0			3–1	5–2	1–0					0–1	2–0			1–0
Atlético Grau	4–1	1–2					1–0			1–2				3–4	0–2	1–1		0–1	
Ayacucho				1–2		2–3	1–2	2–2	2–1			0–1		1–1			5–0	1–2	3–2
Binacional	0–1		1–0	1–1			5–0	2–1	3–0	3–2		0–1		1–0				1–0	
Academia Cantolao	3–0	1–3	1–2					3–2			0–2	0–1	0–1	0–2			2–2	0–3	
Carlos A. Mannucci	1–1			1–0					1–0	0–2				0–1	1–3	0–0		0–0	
Carlos Stein	0–0	0–1		1–1			2–1			2–2					1–1	1–2		2–1	2–0
Cienciano	0–0	5–0			3–1		1–0				4–2		4–1		0–1		5–3		3–2
Deportivo Municipal			0–3	1–1	3–2	1–0		1–0	1–1			1–3		0–1		1–4		2–1	
Melgar	3–0		1–0	1–0				1–0	3–0	1–0						1–0		2–0	
Sport Boys			0–0	2–1	1–0	1–3		1–4	2–1		1–2	0–1		2–3					
Sport Huancayo		4–1	2–0						2–1	3–3		3–0			1–0	1–1		2–0	
Sporting Cristal		1–0			3–2	1–0	2–2				6–4	2–2	3–0				4–1		3–2
Universidad César Vallejo		3–1			2–1	4–0	0–1			0–0			1–1		2–0		2–0		3–1
Universidad San Martín	2–0		0–1	1–2		0–1		1–3	3–1		1–1	2–0	2–0	1–1					
Universitario	2–1	3–1	1–4							1–1			1–1		1–1	3–0	3–0		1–0
UTC				0–0		2–0	2–2	1–2			4–3	3–1	2–1	3–4			3–1		

Source: Liga 1, Soccerway
Legend: Blue = home team win; Yellow = draw; Red = away team win.

== Torneo Clausura ==
=== Standings ===
Pos	Team	Pld	W	D	L	GF	GA	GD	Pts	Qualification
1	Alianza Lima	18	13	3	2	31	10	+21	42	Advance to the Playoffs
2	Sporting Cristal	18	12	5	1	39	17	+22	41	
3	Atlético Grau	18	11	4	3	30	19	+11	37	
4	Universitario	18	9	6	3	26	10	+16	33	
5	Melgar	18	10	3	5	31	18	+13	33	
6	Universidad César Vallejo	18	10	3	5	25	24	+1	33	
7	UTC	18	8	4	6	28	24	+4	28	
8	Sport Huancayo	18	8	3	7	26	19	+7	27	
9	Alianza Atlético	18	8	3	7	23	21	+2	27	
10	Binacional	18	8	2	8	28	19	+9	26	
11	Cienciano	18	7	4	7	24	23	+1	25	
12	ADT	18	6	6	6	25	25	0	24	
13	Sport Boys	18	6	3	9	23	31	−8	21	
14	Deportivo Municipal	18	5	5	8	20	29	−9	20	
15	Academia Cantolao	18	4	7	7	19	22	−3	19	
16	Ayacucho	18	3	5	10	16	28	−12	14	
17	Carlos A. Mannucci	18	3	4	11	13	33	−20	13	
18	Carlos Stein	18	1	3	14	18	43	−25	6	
19	Universidad San Martín	18	1	3	14	17	47	−30	6	

Source: Liga 1, Soccerway
Rules for classification: 1) Points; 2) Goal difference; 3) Goals for; 4) Fair play points; 5) Drawing of lots.

=== Results ===
Home \ Away	ADT	AAS	ALI	CAG	AYA	BIN	CAN	CAM	STE	CIE	MUN	MEL	SBA	SHU	CRI	UCV	USM	UNI	UTC
ADT				1–1		1–0	2–1	2–1	1–0	0–1		1–1					4–1	1–1	
Alianza Atlético	2–2			4–1			3–1		2–1	1–0				1–0	0–2	3–0		2–2	
Alianza Lima	2–0	1–0				2–0	0–0				4–1	2–0	3–1	1–0			5–0	0–2	
Atlético Grau			1–2		3–0	3–1		2–1	0–0		2–1	2–1	3–0				1–0		3–1
Ayacucho	1–2	2–0	0–1							0–1	1–1		1–1		0–1	0–1			
Binacional		2–0			4–1						2–0		3–0		1–1	3–0	4–0		2–0
Academia Cantolao				1–2	1–1	1–0			3–2	3–1					2–2	0–1			0–0
Carlos A. Mannucci		2–2	0–1		0–1	2–1	0–0				1–1	0–1	0–0				3–2		0–2
Carlos Stein			1–2		2–2	2–3		1–2			1–4	0–2	3–2	0–1			1–1		
Cienciano			0–2	2–2		1–1		2–0	6–2			2–2		0–1		2–0		1–0	
Deportivo Municipal	1–0	0–1					1–0			0–0			2–2		0–3		2–1		1–2
Melgar		0–1			3–0	2–1	3–1				6–2		3–0	1–0	0–1		2–1		1–0
Sport Boys	2–1	2–0					1–0			2–1					3–5	1–2	2–0	0–1	3–0
Sport Huancayo	1–1			1–1	0–1	1–0	1–1	4–0			2–1		3–1				3–2		4–0
Sporting Cristal	4–2		0–0	1–2				4–0	3–2	4–1				4–3		0–0		0–0	
Universidad César Vallejo	3–2		3–2	0–1				4–1	3–0		1–1	3–2		2–1				1–0	
Universidad San Martín		1–0			3–3		1–3			1–2					1–2	1–1		0–4	1–5
Universitario				2–0	2–1	2–0	1–1	3–0	2–0		0–1	1–1		2–0					
UTC	2–2	2–1	1–1		2–1				4–0	2–1					0–2	4–0		1–1	

Source: Liga 1, Soccerway
Legend: Blue = home team win; Yellow = draw; Red = away team win.

== Aggregate table ==
Pos	Team	Pld	W	D	L	GF	GA	GD	Pts	Qualification or relegation
1	Sporting Cristal	36	23	10	3	74	37	+37	79	Advance to Playoffs and qualification for Copa Libertadores second stage
2	Alianza Lima (Note: Alianza Lima were awarded two points for winning the 2022 Torneo de Promoción y Reserva.) (C)	36	23	6	7	59	26	+33	77	Advance to Playoffs and qualification for Copa Libertadores group stage
3	Melgar	36	23	5	8	54	29	+25	74	Advance to Playoffs and qualification for Copa Libertadores group stage
4	Sport Huancayo	36	20	7	9	61	37	+24	67	Qualification for Copa Libertadores first stage
5	Universitario	36	17	10	9	50	29	+21	61	Qualification for Copa Sudamericana first stage (Note: Due to the cancellation of the 2022 Copa Bicentenario by the FPF, the spot awarded to its champions (Copa Sudamericana first stage) was passed over to the aggregate table fourth best-placed team not qualified for the Copa Libertadores.)
6	Universidad César Vallejo (Note: Universidad César Vallejo were deducted two points as punishment for failing to pay debts.)	36	18	9	9	50	39	+11	61	Qualification for Copa Sudamericana first stage
7	Cienciano	36	16	9	11	61	45	+16	57	Qualification for Copa Sudamericana first stage
8	Binacional	36	18	3	15	52	38	+14	57	Qualification for Copa Sudamericana first stage
9	Alianza Atlético	36	17	6	13	49	48	+1	57	
10	Atlético Grau	36	15	10	11	50	42	+8	55	
11	UTC	36	14	6	16	57	56	+1	48	
12	Deportivo Municipal (Note: Deportivo Municipal were deducted four points as punishment for failing to pay debts.)	36	12	9	15	50	65	−15	41	
13	ADT	36	9	13	14	39	49	−10	40	
14	Academia Cantolao	36	8	10	18	37	54	−17	34	
15	Carlos A. Mannucci	36	8	9	19	32	55	−23	33	
16	Sport Boys (Note: Sport Boys were deducted seven points as punishment for failing to pay debts.)	36	11	6	19	40	63	−23	32	
17	Ayacucho (Note: Ayacucho were awarded one point for ending as Torneo de Promoción y Reserva runners-up.) (R)	36	6	8	22	41	60	−19	27	Qualification for Relegation playoff
18	Universidad San Martín (R)	36	5	6	25	38	84	−46	21	Relegation to Liga 2
19	Carlos Stein (Note: Carlos Stein were deducted two points as punishment for failing to pay debts.) (R)	36	4	8	24	36	74	−38	18	Relegation to Liga 2

Source: Liga 1
Rules for classification: 1) Points; 2) Goal difference; 3) Goals for; 4) Head-to-head points; 5) Head-to-head goal difference; 6) Head-to-head goals for; 7) Fair play points; 8) Drawing of lots.
(C) Champions; (R) Relegated

== Playoffs ==
Semi-finals				Finals
Melgar	2	2	4
Sporting Cristal	0	0	0
Sporting Cristal	0	0	0	Melgar	1	0	1
				Alianza Lima	0	2	2

=== Semi-final ===
==== First leg ====
2 November 2022
15:00 UTC−5

Melgar	2–0	Sporting Cristal
Iberico 65', 77'	Report

Estadio Monumental de la UNSA, Arequipa
Referee: Bruno Pérez

==== Second leg ====
6 November 2022
15:00 UTC−5

Sporting Cristal	0–2	Melgar
	Report	Cuesta 52'; Iberico 84'

Estadio Nacional, Lima
Referee: Edwin Ordóñez

Melgar won 4–0 on aggregate and advanced to the finals.

=== Finals ===
==== First leg ====
9 November 2022
15:00 UTC−5

Melgar	1–0	Alianza Lima
Vílchez 75' (o.g.)	Report

Estadio Monumental de la UNSA, Arequipa
Referee: Michael Espinoza

==== Second leg ====
12 November 2022
20:00 UTC−5

Alianza Lima	2–0	Melgar
Vílchez 45+1'; Lavandeira 74'	Report

Estadio Alejandro Villanueva, Lima
Referee: Bruno Pérez

Alianza Lima won 2–1 on aggregate.

== Relegation playoff ==
6 November 2022
13:00 UTC−5

Unión Comercio	3–0	Ayacucho
Medrano 49', 64'; Sánchez 90+3'	Report

Estadio Carlos Vidaurre García, Tarapoto
Referee: Joel Alarcón
13 November 2022
15:00 UTC−5

Ayacucho	2–1	Unión Comercio
Regalado 45+4', 72'	Report	Zeta 12'

Estadio Ciudad de Cumaná, Ayacucho
Referee: Edwin Ordóñez

Unión Comercio won 4–2 on aggregate and were promoted to Liga 1. Ayacucho were relegated to Liga 2.

== Top scorers ==
Rank	Player	Club	Goals
1	(Peru) Luis Benítes	Sport Huancayo	19
2	(Argentina) Hernán Barcos	Alianza Lima	18
3	(Argentina) Danilo Carando	Cienciano	16
4	(Uruguay) Facundo Peraza	UTC	15
4	(Colombia) Yorleys Mena	Universidad César Vallejo	15
4	(Peru) Janio Posito	Binacional	15
7	(Argentina) Bernardo Cuesta	Melgar	14
8	(Argentina) Rodrigo Salinas	Atlético Grau	13
8	(Peru) Alexis Rojas	Universidad San Martín	13
8	(Peru) Luis Iberico	Melgar	13
8	(Argentina) Gaspar Gentile	UTC	13

Source: Futbolperuano.com

== See also ==
- 2022 Liga 2
- 2022 Copa Perú
- 2022 Ligas Departamentales del Peru
- 2022 Torneo de Promoción y Reserva
- 2022 Liga Femenina
- 2022 Copa Perú Femenina
