= 2022–23 Promotion League =

Swiss Promotion League
- Season: 2022–23
- Dates: 6 Aug 2022 – 27 May 2023
- Champions: FC Luzern II
- Promoted: Stade Nyonnais; FC Baden
- Relegated: SC YF Juventus
- Matches: 272
- Goals: 970 (3.57 per match)
- Top goalscorer: 24 goals Angelo Campos (SC Brühl)
- Biggest home win: 7–0; E. Carouge – Juventus
- Biggest away win: 2–7; Basel II – St. Gallen II
- Highest scoring: 9 goals Basel II 2–7 St. Gallen II
- All statistics correct as of 27 May 2022.

The 2022–23 Swiss Promotion League (known as the YAPEAL Promotion League for sponsorship reasons) is the 11th season (9th under its current name) of the 3rd tier of the Swiss football league system under its current format.

== Overview ==
Location of the 2022–23 Promotion League teams

Starting from this season, eighteen teams will play in a round-robin league with home and away games. The sixteen teams of the previous season are joined by FC Baden and FC Bulle, who were promoted from the 1. Liga Classic, and SC Kriens, who were relegated from the Challenge League, replaced last season's champion AC Bellinzona. Furthermore, the number of under-21 teams allowed in the Promotion League is no longer restricted to four, starting with this season. This season features five U21 teams.

Due to an increase of teams in the Super League in the 2023–24 season, two teams are directly promoted to the Swiss Challenge League at the end of the season, subject to license validity. The third placed team will play a promotion play-off against the last place of the Challenge League.

Classification also acts as qualifier for the Swiss Cup. The seven highest ranked (eligible) teams directly qualify to the first round of the 2023–24 Swiss Cup. U21 teams are not eligible for the Swiss Cup.

The season started on 6 August 2022 and the final matchday will be held on 27 May 2023. The league will be on winter break between 27 November 2022 and 18 February 2023 (between matchdays 18 and 19). Following the end of the season, the two legs of the Promotion play-off will be played on 31 May and 3 June 2023, respectively.

=== Teams ===
Club	Canton	Stadium	Capacity
FC Baden	Aargau	Esp Stadium	7,000
Basel U-21	Basel-City	Stadion Rankhof or Youth Campus Basel	7,000; 1,000
FC Bavois	Vaud	Terrain des Peupliers	659
FC Biel-Bienne	Bern	Gurzelen Stadion	5,500
FC Breitenrain Bern	Bern	Spitalacker	1,450
SC Brühl	St. Gallen	Paul-Grüninger-Stadion	4,200
FC Bulle	Fribourg	Stade de Bouleyres	7,000
SC Cham	Zug	Stadion Eizmoos	1,800
FC Chiasso	Ticino	Stadio Comunale Riva IV	4,000
Étoile Carouge FC	Geneva	Stade de la Fontenette	3,690
SC Kriens	Lucerne	Stadion Kleinfeld	5,360
FC Luzern U-21	Lucerne	Swissporarena or Allmend Süd	16,800; 2,000
FC Rapperswil-Jona	St. Gallen	Stadion Grünfeld	2,500
FC Stade Nyonnais	Vaud	Stade de Colovray	7,200
St. Gallen U-21	St. Gallen	Espenmoos or Kybunpark	3,000; 19,264
Young Boys U-21	Bern	Stadion Wankdorf	32,000
SC Young Fellows Juventus	Zürich	Utogrund	2,850
Zürich U-21	Zürich	Sportplatz Heerenschürli	1,120

== League table ==
Pos	Team	Pld	W	D	L	GF	GA	GD	Pts	Promotion, qualification or relegation
1	FC Luzern II (Note: Reserve teams are ineligible to qualify for promotion and Swiss Cup.) (C)	34	24	4	6	95	53	+42	74	
2	Stade Nyonnais (P)	34	21	5	8	83	45	+38	66	Promotion to Swiss Challenge League and qualification for 2023–24 Swiss Cup
3	FC Baden (P)	34	18	6	10	61	48	+13	58	Promotion to Swiss Challenge League and qualification for 2023–24 Swiss Cup
4	SC Cham (Note: SC Cham are ineligible for promotion as they did not apply for an SFL license.)	34	17	5	12	60	47	+13	54	Qualification for 2023–24 Swiss Cup
5	FC Rapperswil-Jona	34	17	5	12	59	54	+5	54	Qualification for promotion play-off and 2023–24 Swiss Cup
6	Étoile Carouge FC	34	15	9	10	63	38	+25	52	Qualification for 2023–24 Swiss Cup
7	SC Brühl	34	14	12	8	59	45	+14	52	Qualification for 2023–24 Swiss Cup
8	FC Breitenrain	34	15	8	11	57	57	0	51	Qualification for 2023–24 Swiss Cup
9	FC Basel II	34	12	10	12	53	57	−4	44	
10	SC Kriens	34	13	6	15	53	58	−5	43	
11	BSC Young Boys II	34	11	8	15	64	67	−3	39	
12	FC Zürich II	34	11	7	16	53	56	−3	38	
13	FC Bulle	34	11	6	17	49	57	−8	37	
14	FC Bavois	34	10	9	15	45	65	−20	37	
15	FC St. Gallen II	34	9	7	18	57	86	−29	32	
16	FC Biel-Bienne	34	6	10	18	32	60	−28	26	
17	SC YF Juventus (R)	34	4	5	25	27	77	−50	15	Relegation to the 1. Liga Classic
18	FC Chiasso (Note: FC Chiasso filed for bankruptcy on 14 February 2023. They are placed at the bottom of the league with 34 points. All of their games are set to 0–0 with 0 points awarded to their opponents.)	34	0	34	0	0	0	0	34	Withdrew from the league

Source: Erste Liga - Match center
Rules for classification: 1) Points; 2) Goal difference; 3) Goals scored; 4) Head-to-head goal difference; 5) Away goals scored; 6) Draw.
(C) Champions; (P) Promoted; (R) Relegated

== Results ==
Home \ Away	BAD	BAS	BAV	BIE	BRE	BRÜ	BUL	CHA	ETC	KRI	LUZ	NYO	RAP	STG	BYB	YFJ	ZÜR	CHI
FC Baden	—	0–0	0–1	1–1	4–1	2–0	2–0	4–0	1–2	3–1	4–3	1–3	4–1	2–1	4–3	3–1	2–2	0–0
FC Basel II	5–0	—	1–3	0–0	0–2	1–1	0–5	1–1	1–1	3–2	0–2	1–4	1–2	2–7	2–1	1–0	1–0	0–0
FC Bavois	1–3	4–4	—	3–0	1–3	1–4	2–1	0–0	0–2	3–3	2–3	1–2	1–3	3–3	1–0	1–0	0–3	0–0
FC Biel-Bienne	1–1	1–3	0–1	—	1–1	1–2	0–2	0–1	0–0	2–1	1–6	0–3	0–2	0–1	3–2	2–1	4–2	0–0
FC Breitenrain	0–3	1–3	1–1	1–1	—	1–4	4–0	3–2	2–2	1–3	4–1	1–0	1–0	3–2	3–2	1–0	2–1	0–0
SC Brühl	3–0	0–2	2–1	1–0	3–1	—	2–1	2–1	3–3	1–1	1–2	3–0 (Note: SC Brühl were awarded a 3–0 forfait win, as Stade Nyonnais boycotted the match.)	0–0	1–1	0–0	4–0	2–1	0–0
FC Bulle	0–2	0–2	2–2	3–0	2–2	2–2	—	2–4	1–2	2–0	0–4	1–3	0–2	0–2	2–0	3–0	1–0	0–0
SC Cham	0–2	3–0	2–0	1–2	3–0	3–1	2–1	—	1–0	4–1	3–1	2–1	1–3	2–0	5–2	5–1	0–3	0–0
Étoile Carouge FC	0–2	4–1	1–2	3–2	2–0	4–0	4–0	3–1	—	0–2	6–0	1–0	3–0	3–0	1–1	7–0	1–3	0–0
SC Kriens	4–3	2–2	1–1	4–2	0–3	0–3	0–1	2–0	2–0	—	0–1	0–6	2–0	3–0	4–2	1–0	3–0	0–0
FC Luzern II	2–1	2–1	6–0	3–2	5–2	1–0	3–3	4–3	5–1	3–2	—	3–1	5–1	5–0	4–0	3–1	2–0	0–0
Stade Nyonnais	3–1	1–0	3–2	3–0	3–1	3–3	0–1	1–3	2–0	2–0	5–2	—	0–4	7–1	4–3	3–0	4–3	0–0
FC Rapperswil-Jona	1–2	2–3	2–1	1–0	0–1	4–3	4–1	2–0	0–3	2–1	4–3	2–4	—	2–4	1–0	2–2	1–2	0–0
FC St. Gallen II	0–2	1–3	4–1	2–2	2–5	3–2	4–3	2–2	3–2	1–4	2–5	1–3	2–2	—	3–4	0–2	2–1	0–0
BSC Young Boys II	3–0	3–3	4–1	1–3	3–1	3–3	2–0	2–1	2–1	3–0	2–2	1–1	1–3	3–1	—	4–1	5–1	0–0
SC YF Juventus	0–2	0–5	2–3	0–0	1–3	1–2	1–4	1–2	1–1	2–3	0–1	0–5	0–2	4–1	4–2	—	1–0	0–0
FC Zürich II	5–0	2–1	0–1	4–1	2–2	1–1	0–5	0–2	0–0	2–1	1–3	3–3	3–4	3–1	4–0	1–0	—	0–0
FC Chiasso	0–0	0–0	0–0	0–0	0–0	0–0	0–0	0–0	0–0	0–0	0–0	0–0	0–0	0–0	0–0	0–0	0–0	—

Source: Erste Liga - Match center
Legend: Blue = home team win; Yellow = draw; Red = away team win.

== Promotion play-off ==
The relegation/promotion play-off will be played in a two-legged game between the last placed team of the Challenge League and the third placed team of the Promotion League. The first leg will be held on 31 May 2023, with the representative of the Promotion League hosting. The second leg will be held on 3 June 2023.

==== First leg ====
31 May 2023
19:30 CEST (UTC+2)

Rapperswil-Jona	1–3	Xamax
Volkart 54'	Report	7' Aliu; 20' Bakayoko; 26' Del Toro

Stadium Grünfeld, Rapperswil
Attendance: 2,154

==== Second leg ====
3 June 2023
19:00 CEST (UTC+2)

Xamax	3–0	Rapperswil-Jona
Hammerich 58'; Del Toro 69'; Pinga 73'	Report

Stade de la Maladière, Neuchâtel
Attendance: 6,414

Xamax wins 6–1 on aggregate

== Top Scorers ==
As of 27 May 2023

Rank	Player	Club	Goals
1	Angelo Campos	SC Brühl	24
2	Fabrizio Cavegn	FC St. Gallen II	21
3	Marin Wiskemann	SC Cham	20
4	Davide Giampa	FC Baden	17
5	Robin Golliard	FC Bulle	15
5	Théo Golliard	Young Boys II	15
5	Mihailo Stevanovic	FC Luzern II	15
8	Christian Gomis	Stade Nyonnais	13
8	Christian Konan	FC Rapperswil-Jona	13
8	Albin Krasniqi	FC St. Gallen II	13
