= 2019 Campeonato Nacional Primera División =

Campeonato Nacional
- Season: 2019
- Dates: 15 February – 29 November 2019
- Champions: Universidad Católica (14th title)
- Copa Libertadores: Universidad Católica; Colo-Colo; Palestino
- Copa Sudamericana: Unión La Calera; Coquimbo Unido; Huachipato; Audax Italiano
- Matches: 194
- Goals: 514 (2.65 per match)
- Top goalscorer: Lucas Passerini (14 goals)
- Biggest home win: U. Católica 5–0 Cobresal (6 October)
- Biggest away win: Unión Española 0–4 Everton (21 April)
- Highest scoring: O'Higgins 3–6 Antofagasta (28 July)
- Highest attendance: 43,646; U. de Chile 2–1 Dep. Iquique (17 October)
- Total attendance: 1,344,615
- Average attendance: 6,967

The 2019 Campeonato Nacional, known as Campeonato AFP PlanVital 2019 for sponsorship reasons, was the 89th season of top-flight football in Chile. The season started on 15 February 2019. Universidad Católica were the defending champions, having won the previous tournament.

Due to the 2019 Chilean protests, the competition was suspended since mid-October with six matchdays still left. After a failed attempt to resume normal activity that saw only one match fully played, on 29 November 2019, ANFP's Council of Presidents voted to conclude the season. Thus Universidad Católica, who were leading the competition at the time of the suspension, won their fourteenth title. No teams were relegated to the Primera B this season.

== Teams ==
Sixteen teams took part in the league in this season: the top fourteen teams from the previous season, plus Coquimbo Unido and Cobresal, who were promoted from the Primera B. Both promoted teams replaced Deportes Temuco and San Luis, who were relegated at the end of the last season.

=== Stadia and locations ===
Locations of the 2019 Chilean Primera División teams.

Team	City	Stadium	Capacity
Audax Italiano	Santiago (La Florida)	Bicentenario de La Florida	12,000
Cobresal	El Salvador	El Cobre	12,000
Colo-Colo	Santiago (Macul)	Monumental David Arellano	47,347
Coquimbo Unido	Coquimbo	Francisco Sánchez Rumoroso	18,750
Curicó Unido	Curicó	La Granja	8,278
Deportes Antofagasta	Antofagasta	Calvo y Bascuñán	21,178
Deportes Iquique	Iquique	Cavancha	5,500
Everton	Viña del Mar	Sausalito	22,360
Huachipato	Talcahuano	Huachipato-CAP Acero	10,500
O'Higgins	Rancagua	El Teniente	13,849
Palestino	Santiago (La Cisterna)	Municipal de La Cisterna	8,000
Unión Española	Santiago (Independencia)	Santa Laura-Universidad SEK	19,000
Unión La Calera	La Calera	Nicolás Chahuán Nazar	9,200
Universidad Católica	Santiago (Las Condes)	San Carlos de Apoquindo	14,118
Universidad de Chile	Santiago (Ñuñoa)	Nacional Julio Martínez Prádanos	48,665
Universidad de Concepción	Concepción	Alcaldesa Ester Roa Rebolledo	30,448

=== Personnel and kits ===
Team	Head coach	Kit manufacturer	Sponsors
Audax Italiano	(Chile) Juan José Ribera	Macron	Traverso
Cobresal	(Chile) Gustavo Huerta	KS7	PF
Colo-Colo	(Chile) Mario Salas	Umbro	MG Motor
Coquimbo Unido	(Argentina) Patricio Graff	CAFU	PF
Curicó Unido	(Chile) Hugo Vilches	OneFit	Multihogar
Deportes Antofagasta	(Argentina) Juan Manuel Azconzábal	CAFU	Minera Escondida
Deportes Iquique	(Chile) Jaime Vera	Rete	UNAP
Everton	(Argentina) Javier Torrente	Pirma	Marathonbet
Huachipato	(Paraguay) Gustavo Florentín	OneFit	PF
O'Higgins	(Chile) Marco Antonio Figueroa	Adidas	Sun Monticello
Palestino	(Chile) Ivo Basay	Capelli Sport	Bank of Palestine
Unión Española	(Chile) Ronald Fuentes	Kappa	Universidad SEK
Unión La Calera	(Argentina) Walter Coyette	Lyon	PF
Universidad Católica	(Argentina) Gustavo Quinteros	Under Armour	DirecTV
Universidad de Chile	(Chile) Hernán Caputto (caretaker)	Adidas	Petrobras
Universidad de Concepción	(Chile) Francisco Bozán	KS7	Algoritmos

=== Managerial changes ===
Team	Outgoing manager	Manner of departure	Date of vacancy	Position in table	Incoming manager	Date of appointment
Colo-Colo	(Chile) Héctor Tapia	End of contract	2 December 2018	Pre-season	(Chile) Mario Salas	18 December 2018
Deportes Iquique	(Chile) Luis Musrri	End of contract	3 December 2018	Pre-season	(Argentina) Pablo Sánchez	4 December 2018
Everton	(Argentina) Javier Torrente	End of contract	4 December 2018	Pre-season	(Uruguay) Gustavo Díaz	13 December 2018
Universidad Católica	(Spain) Beñat San José	Resigned	10 December 2018	Pre-season	(Argentina) Gustavo Quinteros	21 December 2018
Curicó Unido	(Chile) Jaime Vera	Signed by OFI Crete	25 January 2019	Pre-season	(Argentina) Dalcio Giovagnoli	28 January 2019
Universidad de Chile	(Argentina) Frank Kudelka	Resigned	13 March 2019	10th	(Uruguay) Alfredo Arias	14 March 2019
Deportes Antofagasta	(Argentina) Gerardo Ameli	Sacked	18 May 2019	14th	(Argentina) Walter Fiori (caretaker)	18 May 2019
Deportes Antofagasta	(Argentina) Walter Fiori	End of caretaker spell	27 May 2019	16th	(Argentina) Juan Manuel Azconzábal	27 May 2019
Huachipato	(Argentina) Nicolás Larcamón	Mutual consent	9 July 2019	9th	(Paraguay) Gustavo Florentín	11 July 2019
Deportes Iquique	(Argentina) Pablo Sánchez	Mutual consent	29 July 2019	12th	(Chile) Jaime Vera	30 July 2019
Universidad de Chile	(Uruguay) Alfredo Arias	Sacked	4 August 2019	15th	(Chile) Hernán Caputto (caretaker)	5 August 2019
Unión Española	(Chile) Fernando Díaz	Sacked	23 August 2019	8th	(Chile) Ronald Fuentes	24 August 2019
Unión La Calera	(Argentina) Francisco Meneghini	Sacked	16 September 2019	7th	(Argentina) Walter Coyette	17 September 2019
Everton	(Uruguay) Gustavo Díaz	Sacked	17 September 2019	13th	(Argentina) Javier Torrente	18 September 2019
Curicó Unido	(Argentina) Dalcio Giovagnoli	Sacked	7 October 2019	12th	(Chile) Hugo Vilches	10 October 2019

== Standings ==
Pos	Team	Pld	W	D	L	GF	GA	GD	Pts	Qualification
1	Universidad Católica (C)	24	16	5	3	44	14	+30	53	Qualification for Copa Libertadores group stage
2	Colo-Colo	24	11	7	6	37	30	+7	40	Qualification for Copa Libertadores group stage
3	Palestino	24	10	8	6	42	31	+11	38	Qualification for Copa Libertadores second stage
4	Unión La Calera	25	9	10	6	29	23	+6	37	Qualification for Copa Sudamericana first stage
5	Coquimbo Unido	24	8	10	6	29	27	+2	34	Qualification for Copa Sudamericana first stage
6	Huachipato	24	9	7	8	31	30	+1	34	Qualification for Copa Sudamericana first stage
7	Audax Italiano	24	10	4	10	35	35	0	34	Qualification for Copa Sudamericana first stage
8	O'Higgins	24	10	4	10	34	35	−1	34	
9	Unión Española	25	10	4	11	32	35	−3	34	
10	Cobresal	25	10	4	11	31	39	−8	34	
11	Everton	24	7	8	9	21	24	−3	29	
12	Deportes Antofagasta	24	7	6	11	34	35	−1	27	
13	Curicó Unido	24	6	8	10	36	43	−7	26	
14	Deportes Iquique	25	6	7	12	24	40	−16	25	
15	Universidad de Chile	24	4	12	8	32	38	−6	24	
16	Universidad de Concepción	24	5	8	11	23	35	−12	23	

Source: ANFP, Soccerway
Rules for classification: 1) Points, 2) Playoff game (only if needed to decide championship between two teams), 3) Goal difference, 4) Matches won, 5) Goals for, 6) Away goals for, 7) Red cards, 8) Yellow cards, 9) Drawing of lots.
(C) Champions

== Results ==
Home \ Away	AUD	CSL	CC	COQ	CUR	ANT	DIQ	EVE	HUA	OHI	PAL	UE	ULC	UC	UCH	UDC
Audax Italiano	—	—	2–4	2–0	3–1	0–3	3–1	—	0–1	2–2	2–3	3–2	1–1	0–2	3–1	—
Cobresal	1–2	—	0–0	4–1	—	2–2	0–1	2–1	1–1	2–1	3–2	3–2	1–0	0–2	—	1–0
Colo-Colo	3–0	0–2	—	—	0–1	1–0	2–0	0–0	2–2	3–2	2–1	1–0	—	2–3	3–2	1–0
Coquimbo Unido	1–0	—	2–0	—	2–1	1–1	1–1	4–0	—	—	2–2	2–0	1–1	1–2	2–2	2–2
Curicó Unido	2–2	3–1	3–4	0–0	—	—	1–2	2–2	4–2	2–1	1–1	—	—	1–4	—	4–2
Deportes Antofagasta	1–0	2–0	—	0–1	1–1	—	—	1–1	0–1	3–1	0–1	1–2	1–1	1–2	3–1	—
Deportes Iquique	1–3	0–1	—	0–1	0–0	2–0	—	0–0	—	1–3	3–3	3–2	1–0	—	2–4	2–2
Everton	0–2	2–1	—	0–2	2–1	1–0	2–0	—	0–0	—	—	1–0	1–2	1–2	1–1	1–0
Huachipato	2–0	3–1	1–1	0–0	2–0	4–3	1–1	—	—	2–1	0–2	—	1–2	0–1	—	1–0
O'Higgins	—	2–0	1–0	2–0	—	3–6	4–1	2–1	0–3	—	—	0–2	3–1	1–0	1–0	1–2
Palestino	1–2	3–0	2–2	2–0	4–2	—	—	1–0	3–1	1–1	—	—	1–1	1–2	1–1	4–1
Unión Española	0–2	1–3	1–3	3–1	2–1	—	4–0	0–4	2–1	0–1	1–0	—	1–1	—	1–1	1–0
Unión La Calera	—	2–1	1–1	—	2–0	2–3	0–0	0–0	2–1	2–0	2–0	1–2	—	1–0	0–0	3–1
Universidad Católica	—	5–0	—	1–1	0–0	5–1	0–1	1–0	—	0–0	—	0–0	1–0	—	4–0	3–1
Universidad de Chile	1–1	1–1	1–1	1–1	3–3	1–0	2–1	—	3–0	—	2–3	1–2	1–1	1–1	—	
Universidad de Concepción	1–0	—	3–1	—	1–2	1–1	1–0	0–0	1–1	1–1	0–0	1–1	—	0–3	2–1	—

Source: ANFP, Soccerway
Legend: Blue = home team win; Yellow = draw; Red = away team win.

== Top goalscorers ==
Rank	Name	Club	Goals
1	(Argentina) Lucas Passerini	Palestino	14
2	(Argentina) Tobías Figueroa	Deportes Antofagasta	11
2	(Chile) Ignacio Jeraldino	Audax Italiano	11
4	(Chile) Matías Donoso	Deportes Iquique	10
4	(Chile) Roberto Gutiérrez	Palestino	10
6	(Chile) José Pedro Fuenzalida	Universidad Católica	9
7	(Chile) Carlos Muñoz	Cobresal	8
7	(Argentina) Mauro Quiroga	Curicó Unido	8
7	(Chile) Sebastián Varas	Unión Española	8
10	(Argentina) Leandro Benegas	Universidad de Chile	7
10	(Chile) Iván Ledezma	Audax Italiano	7
10	(Argentina) Juan Sánchez Sotelo	Huachipato	7

Source: Soccerway

== Attendances ==
#	Club	Total attendance	Average attendance
1	Universidad de Chile	440,476	18,353
2	Colo-Colo	434,038	18,085
3	Universidad Católica	256,524	10,689
4	Coquimbo Unido	155,088	6,462
5	Unión Española	141,498	5,660
6	Deportes Iquique	130,548	5,440
7	Everton	126,194	5,258
8	O'Higgins	123,139	5,131
9	Universidad de Concepción	122,126	5,089
10	Deportes Antofagasta	122,069	5,086
11	Curicó Unido	117,159	4,882
12	Unión La Calera	116,113	4,838
13	Palestino	107,518	4,480
14	Audax Italiano	104,247	4,344
15	Huachipato	96,974	4,041
16	Cobresal	95,463	3,819
