= Jostin =

Jostin is a masculine given name. Notable people with the name include:

- Jostin Alarcón, Peruvian footballer
- Jostin Tellería, Costa Rican footballer

== See also ==
- Darwin Jostin (Joston), American actor
- Justin (given name)
