= Leonardo Morales =

Leonardo Morales may refer to:

- Leonardo Morales (footballer, born 1960), Peruvian footballer and manager
- Leonardo Morales (footballer, born 1975), retired Honduran footballer
- Leonardo Morales (footballer, born 1978), Venezuelan football goalkeeper
- Leonardo Morales (footballer, born 1987), Argentine football midfielder
- Leonardo Morales (footballer, born 1991), Argentine football defender
- Leonardo Morales y Pedroso (1887–1965), Cuban architect
- Leonardo Morales Morales (fl. 21st Century), Costa Rican Scout
