= Aaron Sanchez =

Aaron Sanchez may refer to:

- Aarón Sánchez (chef) (born 1976), Mexican-American celebrity chef
- Aaron Sanchez (baseball) (born 1992), American baseball player
- Aarón Sánchez (footballer) (born 1996), Andorran footballer

== See also ==
- Arón Sánchez (born 2003), Peruvian footballer
