= Felipe Rodríguez (footballer, born 1990) =

Uruguayan footballer

Personal information
- Full name: Felipe Jorge Rodríguez Valla
- Date of birth: May 26, 1990 (age 36)
- Place of birth: Juanicó, Uruguay
- Height: 1.80 m (5 ft 11 in)
- Position: Midfielder

Team information
- Current team: Miami FC

Senior career*
| Years | Team | Apps | (Gls) |
| 2012–2013 | Cerro | 12 | (0) |
| 2013 | El Tanque Sisley | 3 | (0) |
| 2014 | Boston River | 14 | (4) |
| 2014 | El Tanque Sisley | 14 | (2) |
| 2015–2016 | Defensor Sporting | 30 | (10) |
| 2016 | Chiapas | 3 | (0) |
| 2017 | L.D.U. Quito | 11 | (0) |
| 2018 | Godoy Cruz | 12 | (0) |
| 2018 | Bolívar | 22 | (7) |
| 2018–2019 | Alianza Lima | 33 | (8) |
| 2020 | Hapoel Tel Aviv | 7 | (0) |
| 2020 | Aldosivi | 2 | (0) |
| 2021 | Carlos A. Mannucci | 25 | (12) |
| 2022–2023 | Cusco FC | 56 | (18) |
| 2025– | Miami FC | 1 | (0) |
- * Club domestic league appearances and goals as of 22 October 2025

Felipe Jorge Rodríguez Valla (born May 26, 1990) is an Uruguayan professional footballer who currently plays for Miami FC.

== Career statistics ==
=== Club ===
As of 22 October 2023.

| Club | Season | League | | Cup | | Continental | | Total | |
| Club | Season | Apps | Goals | Apps | Goals | Apps | Goals | Apps | Goals |
|---|---|---|---|---|---|---|---|---|---|
Boston River
| Boston River | 2011-12 | 21 | 3 | - | - | - | - | 21 | 3 |
| Boston River | 2013-14 | 14 | 4 | - | - | - | - | 14 | 4 |
| Boston River | Total | 35 | 7 | - | - | - | - | 35 | 7 |
| Cerro | 2012-13 | 12 | 0 | - | - | - | - | 12 | 0 |
El Tanque Sisley
| El Tanque Sisley | 2013-14 | 3 | 0 | - | - | 2 | 0 | 5 | 0 |
| El Tanque Sisley | 2014-15 | 14 | 2 | - | - | - | - | 14 | 2 |
| El Tanque Sisley | Total | 17 | 2 | - | - | 2 | 0 | 19 | 2 |
Defensor Sporting
| Defensor Sporting | 2014-15 | 9 | 1 | - | - | 0 | 0 | 9 | 1 |
| Defensor Sporting | 2015-16 | 21 | 9 | - | - | 8 | 0 | 29 | 9 |
| Defensor Sporting | Total | 30 | 10 | - | - | 8 | 0 | 38 | 10 |
| Chiapas | 2016-17 | 3 | 0 | 2 | 2 | - | - | 5 | 2 |
| L.D.U. Quito | 2017 | 11 | 0 | 0 | 0 | 1 | 0 | 12 | 0 |
| Godoy Cruz | 2017-18 | 12 | 0 | 2 | 1 | 1 | 0 | 15 | 1 |
| Bolívar | 2018 | 22 | 7 | 0 | 0 | 2 | 0 | 24 | 7 |
| Alianza Lima | 2019 | 33 | 8 | 3 | 1 | 5 | 0 | 41 | 9 |
| Hapoel Tel Aviv | 2019-20 | 7 | 0 | 2 | 1 | - | - | 9 | 1 |
| Aldosivi | 2020 | - | - | 2 | 0 | - | - | 2 | 0 |
| Carlos A. Mannucci | 2021 | 25 | 12 | 2 | 1 | 2 | 0 | 29 | 13 |
Cusco FC
| Cusco FC | 2022 | 23 | 9 | - | - | - | - | 23 | 9 |
| Cusco FC | 2023 | 33 | 9 | - | - | - | - | 33 | 9 |
| Cusco FC | Total | 56 | 18 | - | - | - | - | 56 | 18 |
| Career total | | 263 | 64 | 13 | 6 | 21 | 0 | 297 | 70 |

== Honours ==
Cusco FC

- Liga 2: 2022
