= Luis Benítes =

Peruvian footballer

Personal information
- Full name: Luis Enrique Benítes Vargas
- Date of birth: 9 July 1996 (age 30)
- Place of birth: Piura, Peru
- Height: 1.65 m (5 ft 5 in)
- Position: Midfielder

Team information
- Current team: Atlético Grau
- Number: 96

Senior career*
Years	Team	Apps	(Gls)
2016	Defensor La Bocana	28	(1)
2017	Alianza Atlético	26	(0)
2018	Atlético Grau	23	(5)
2019–2020	Carlos A. Mannucci	36	(1)
2021–2024	Sport Huancayo	110	(33)
2025	Cienciano	31	(6)
2026	ADT	16	(3)
2026–	Atlético Grau	13	(1)
- * Club domestic league appearances and goals as of 13:13, 15 November 2026 (UTC)

Luis Enrique Benítes Vargas (born 9 July 1996) is a Peruvian footballer who plays as a forward for Atlético Grau in the Peruvian Primera División.

He has played over 250 games in the Peruvian Primera División and scored over 40 goals, for Defensor La Bocana, Alianza Atlético, Carlos A. Mannucci, Sport Huancayo, Cienciano, ADT and Atlético Grau. He was the top scorer of the 2022 season with 19 goals in 35 games for Sport Huancayo.

== Early and personal life ==
Born in Piura, Benítes earned the nickname 'Chin' from his younger sister. His father played football for clubs in northern Peru such as Juan Aurich, Atlético Torino and Atlético Grau. The elder Benítes reflected to his son that this career had not gone well due to a lack of dedication.

Benítes's football heroes were William Chiroque and Yoshimar Yotún. In 2022, through a couple of mutual friends and teammates, he received a pair of the latter's boots and wore them in his top-scoring season.

Aged 14, Benítes trialled for Club Deportivo Universidad César Vallejo in Trujillo. Homesick and missing his future wife Xiomara Serrano, he left the training camp and returned to Piura. Benítes began his career at Deportivo UNP in his local district league. At 16, he was paid 60-80 Peruvian soles per game and rewarded with a duck or a hen for scoring.

Benítes and Serrano became parents to a son, named after the Brazilian forward Adriano.

== Club career ==
Benítes joined Defensor La Bocana, signing his first professional contract of US$1,000 at age 18. He helped them gain promotion to the Peruvian Primera División by winning the Copa Perú in 2015.

In 28 games of the 2016 Torneo Descentralizado, Benítes scored once – opening a 3–1 loss at Juan Aurich – as La Bocana were relegated in last place. His top-flight debut on 27 February was at centre-back in a 2–2 draw at Melgar, while he also played as a defensive midfielder and on right-sided positions in the midfield and defence.

Benítes played the 2017 season at Alianza Atlético, again suffering relegation from the top flight, while the following season was spent at Atlético Grau in the Peruvian Segunda División. In 2019, he returned to the top division at Carlos A. Mannucci; in two seasons (36 games) with the team from Trujillo, he scored once to equalise in a 3–2 home win over Pirata FC on 17 March 2019.

Benítes signed for Sport Huancayo ahead of the 2021 season. He scored 19 goals in 35 games in 2022, finishing as top scorer. He received offers from Lima-based duo Club Universitario de Deportes and Sporting Cristal, as well as Talleres de Córdoba in Argentina and the Saudi Pro League, but none could complete a deal with Sport Huancayo.

In November 2024, Benítes signed for Cienciano for the upcoming season. After scoring six goals in 31 games as the club qualified for the Copa Sudamericana, he moved on to ADT a year later. After three goals for the club, he returned to his hometown's Atlético Grau on 10 June 2026, now in the top flight.

== Honours ==
Defensor La Bocana

- Copa Perú: 2015

Individual

- Peruvian Primera División top scorer: 2022
