= Javier Navea =

Peruvian footballer (born 2003)

Personal information
- Full name: Luis Javier Navea Tolmos
- Date of birth: 11 May 2003 (age 23)
- Place of birth: Ica, Peru
- Height: 1.80 m (5 ft 11 in)
- Position: Attacking midfielder

Youth career
- Alianza Lima

Senior career*
Years	Team	Apps	(Gls)
2021–2025	Alianza Lima	1	(0)
2022	→ Novorizontino (loan)	0	(0)
2023–2024	→ Unión Comercio (loan)	25	(2)
2025	→ Alianza Atlético (loan)	1	(0)
2025	Vendsyssel	5	(0)
- * Club domestic league appearances and goals as of 13:33, 3 January 2026 (UTC)

Luis Javier Navea Tolmos "El Cachudo" (born 11 May 2003) is a Peruvian footballer who plays as an attacking midfielder.

== Club career ==
=== Alianza Lima ===
Navea started at Alianza Lima as an 11-year-old in 2015. Six years later, in March 2021, he officially became part of the first-team squad. Navea got his official debut for the club on 29 October 2025, in a Peruvian Primera División game against Cienciano, where Navea was in the starting line-up.

Navea did not get any further first-team appearances until July 2022, which is why he was loaned out to the Brazilian club Grêmio Novorizontino for the rest of the year. He only played for the club's U20/reserve team, however, where he greatly impressed, according to several media outlets. He did, however, return to Alianza after the end of the year.

In July 2023, he was loaned out to Peruvian Primera División side Unión Comercio until the end of the year. At the end of February, the loan spell was extended until the end of 2024.

In March 2025, Navea was once again loaned out, this time to Alianza Atlético for the rest of 2025.

=== Vendsyssel FF ===
On 15 August 2025, it was confirmed that Navea had joined Danish 2nd Division side Vendsyssel FF on a deal until June 2027. He left the club again in January 2026 after getting his contract terminated by mutual consent.
