= Jhilmar Lora =

Peruvian footballer (born 2000)

Personal information
- Full name: Carlos Jhilmar Lora Saavedra
- Date of birth: 24 October 2000 (age 26)
- Place of birth: Lima, Peru
- Height: 1.76 m (5 ft 9 in)
- Position: Right-back

Team information
- Current team: Novorizontino
- Number: 24

Senior career*
Years	Team	Apps	(Gls)
2019–2025	Sporting Cristal	121	(0)
2026-	Novorizontino	3	(0)

International career^{‡}
2021–	Peru	8	(0)
- * Club domestic league appearances and goals as of 17 November 2026 ‡ National team caps and goals as of 15:37, 23 March 2024 (UTC)

Carlos Jhilmar Lora Saavedra (born 24 October 2000), better known as Jhilmar Lora, is a Peruvian professional footballer who plays as a right-back for Campeonato Brasileiro Série B club Novorizontino and the Peru national team.

== Early life ==
Lora was born on 24 October 2000 in Callao. He developed an interest in football at an early age and frequently played in the Boterín neighborhood. At the age of four, he joined Sporting Cristal's academy branch at the Liceo Naval in La Perla. He was later coached by Bruno Ferreira, and in 2013 joined the program led by Professor Hitzvan Tazayco.

Lora started playing in the youth divisions at the age of eleven. During his eight years playing there, he won several youth competions. Youth coach Conrad Flores later recalled that Lora initially played as centre-back before being converted to right-back because of his playing characteristics.

Lora progressed through Sporting Cristal's youth system alongside players Joao Grimaldo and Benjamin Villalta. Between 2016 to 2019, he won several reserve and youth tournaments with the club and scored the winning goal in a 2017 Torneo Centenario Sub-17 Clausura game against Alianza Lima. In 2019, he was promoted to Sporting Cristal's first team while continuing to represent the club at the youth level in the Copa Libertadores Sub-20.

== Club career ==
=== Sporting Cristal ===
On 7 August 2019, Lora signed his first professional contract with Sporting Cristal and was promoted to the first team. He made his professional debut later that season against Melgar, coming on as a substitute in the second half. In the 2020, he made four starts in league matches and was part of the Sporting Cristal team that won the 2020 Liga 1 title.

On 31 January 2021, Sporting Cristal extended Lora’s contract until the end of 2023. During the 2021 season, he recorded his first two professional assists, against Deportivo Binacional and Universidad Técnica de Cajamarca. He made his Copa Libertadores debut against São Paulo on 21 April and his Copa Sudamericana debut against Arsenal de Sarandí on 14 July. Sporting Cristal reached the Copa Sudamericana quarter-finals, where they were eliminated by Peñarol. Lora also played in the final of 2021 Liga 1 season, in which Sporting Cristal finished as runners-up after losing to Alianza Lima. He was subsequently included in the league’s “ideal team” of the season.

== International career ==
On 27 April 2021, Lora was included in head coach Ricardo Gareca’s preliminary 50-player squad for the 2021 Copa América in Brazil. He received his first senior national team call-up on 21 May for the 2022 FIFA World Cup qualifier matches against Colombia and Ecuador, and was subsequently included in Peru’s final team for the Copa América. Lora made his international debut in Peru’s quarter-final match against Paraguay, replacing Aldo Corzo late in the match. Peru drew 3-3 before advancing on penalties, with Lora becoming the first Peruvian player born in the 21st century to appear in the Copa América. He also appeared as a substitute against Brazil in the semi-final and Colombia in the third-place match, with Peru finishing fourth.

On 29 August 2021, Lora was called up for Peru’s World Cup qualifier matches against Uruguay, Venezuela, and Brazil. He was subsequently selected for the September international window, which included matches against Chile, Bolivia, and Argentina. Lora made his first World Cup qualifying appearance as a starter against Argentina on 14 October, in a 1-0 defeat. He became the first t Peruvian player born in the 21st century to appear in a CONMEBOL World Cup qualifying match.

Lora continued to receive international call-ups around the 2022 World Cup qualifying campaign, including for Peru’s January 2022 friendlies against Panama and Jamaica and subsequent World Cup qualifiers against Colombia, Ecuador, Uruguay, and Paraguay.

== Playing style ==
Lora primarily plays as a right-back. Sources have described his acceleration, creativity, and ability to contribute to attacking play, including through crossing and creating chances for his teammates.

Lora is a defender capable of progressing the ball from defence and contributing to attacks. His playing style has been characterized by his pace, technical ability, and aerial play, as well as his ability to make both long and short passes during build-up play. His acceleration allows him to cover ground quickly.

Lora developed as a right-back after initially playing as a centre-back in his youth. He has also been used as a winger, and, on occasion, as a centre-back. Sporting Cristal manager Roberto Mosquera compared him to former Peru international Nolberto Solano and described him as “an excellent and interesting player in Peruvian soccer”. Former Peru international Julio César Uribe also described Lora as a player of international stature. His playing style has been characterized by his technical ability, passing, creativity, and defensive work, while his pace allows him to contribute both defensively and in attack.

== Career statistics ==
=== Club ===
As of match played 3 March 2024

Appearances and goals by club, season and competition
Club	Season	League			National Cup		Continental		Total	
Club	Season	Division	Apps	Goals	Apps	Goals	Apps	Goals	Apps	Goals
Sporting Cristal	2019	Liga 1	1	0	-		-		1	0
Sporting Cristal	2020	Liga 1	4	0	-		-		4	0
Sporting Cristal	2021	Liga 1	23	0	1	0	10	0	34	0
Sporting Cristal	2022	Liga 1	24	0	-		2	0	26	0
Sporting Cristal	2023	Liga 1	26	0	-		11	2	37	2
Sporting Cristal	2024	Liga 1	4	0	-		2	0	6	0
Sporting Cristal	2025	Liga 1	0	0	0	0	0	0	0	0
Sporting Cristal	Total		82	0	1	0	25	0	108	0
Career total			82	0	1	0	25	0	108	0

== Honours ==
Sporting Cristal

- Liga 1: 2020
- Copa Bicentenario: 2021
- Torneo Apertura: 2021

Novorizontino

- Campeonato Brasileiro Série B: 2026
