= Valeriani =

Valeriani is a surname. Notable people with the surname include:

- José Julio Espinoza Valeriani (born 1974), Peruvian-Italian footballer
- Richard Valeriani (1932–2018), American journalist
- Giuseppe Valeriani (c. 1708 – 1761/62), Italian-born Russian artist
