= Mario Velarde (footballer, born 1990) =

Peruvian footballer

Personal information
- Full name: Mario Alfonso Velarde Pinto
- Date of birth: 3 July 1990 (age 36)
- Place of birth: Lima, Peru
- Height: 1.82 m (6 ft 0 in)
- Positions: Left winger; attacking midfielder

Team information
- Current team: Unión Comercio

Senior career*
Years	Team	Apps	(Gls)
2008–2009	Inti Gas Deportes	44	(6)
2010	Cienciano	17	(0)
2010	Inti Gas Deportes	12	(3)
2011	Juan Aurich	0	(0)
2012	León de Huánuco	16	(1)
2013	Juan Aurich	23	(0)
2014–2015	Unión Comercio	57	(6)
2016	Cimarrones de Sonora	6	(0)
2016–2017	Unión Comercio	77	(13)
2018	Alianza Lima	22	(1)
2019	Sport Huancayo	2	(0)
2019–2020	Unión Comercio	10	(2)
2020	Deportivo Municipal	35	(1)
2021	Unión Comercio	7	(0)
2022	Alfonso Ugarte	6	(1)
2022	Comerciantes Unidos	5	(0)
2023	Carlos Stein	20	(2)
2024	San Marcos	22	(5)
2024	Estudiantil CNI		
2025–	Unión Comercio	8	(0)

International career
2014	Peru	8	(0)
- * Club domestic league appearances and goals as of 10 August 2025

Mario Alfonso Velarde Pinto (born 3 July 1990) is a Peruvian professional footballer who plays as a left winger or attacking midfielder for Unión Comercio.

He made his debut for Peru in a 3–0 defeat to England at Wembley Stadium on 30 May 2014.
