= Sergio Castellanos =

Argentine football manager

Personal information
- Full name: Walter Sergio Castellanos
- Date of birth: 18 April 1966 (age 60)
- Place of birth: Bahía Blanca, Argentina

Team information
- Current team: Ayacucho (manager)

Managerial career
- Years: Team
- San Martín de San Juan (youth)
- Central Córdoba de Rosario (youth)
- Sportivo Las Parejas
- 2016: Deportivo Municipal (reserves)
- 2016–2017: Deportivo Municipal (assistant)
- 2017: Real Garcilaso (assistant)
- 2018: Sport Huancayo (assistant)
- 2019: Santos de Nasca
- 2020: Santos de Nasca
- 2021–2022: Cusco (assistant)
- 2022–2023: UTC (assistant)
- 2023: Ayacucho
- 2024: Santos de Nasca
- 2025: Cajamarca
- 2025: Bentín Tacna Heroica
- 2025–: Ayacucho

Walter Sergio Castellanos (born 18 April 1966) is an Argentine football manager, currently in charge of Peruvian club Ayacucho.

== Career ==
Born in Bahía Blanca, Castellanos worked in the youth sides of San Martín de San Juan and Central Córdoba de Rosario before having his first managerial experience at Sportivo Las Parejas. In 2016, he moved to Peru and joined Deportivo Municipal; initially a manager of the reserves, he became an assistant manager of the first team after Marcelo Grioni was appointed manager.

Castellanos continued working as an assistant to Grioni in the following years, at Real Garcilaso and Sport Huancayo, before being appointed manager of Santos de Nasca on 1 March 2019. He left the club at the end of the season, but returned in September 2020.

In August 2021, Castellanos rejoined Grioni after becoming his assistant at Cusco FC. He followed Grioni to UTC the following April, but left along with the manager in May 2023, and returned to managerial duties with Ayacucho in July.

On 11 January 2024, Castellanos returned to Santos as manager. Sacked on 13 September, he took over FC Cajamarca on 6 January of the following year, but moved to Bentín Tacna Heroica on 2 March, before the start of the 2025 Liga 2.

Castellanos was dismissed by Bentín on 8 April 2025, after just one match. On 10 July, he returned to Ayacucho, with the club now in the top tier.
