= César Payovich =

Uruguayan football manager (born 1957)

Personal information
- Full name: César Payovich Pérez
- Date of birth: 10 December 1957 (age 68)
- Place of birth: Montevideo, Uruguay
- Position: Defender

Senior career*
| Years | Team | Apps | (Gls) |
- Defensor Sporting

Managerial career
- 1991–1997: Defensor Sporting (youth)
- 1997–1998: Defensor Sporting (assistant)
- 1999–2000: Cobresal (assistant)
- 2001–2002: Defensor Sporting (assistant)
- 2002: Defensor Sporting (interim)
- 2004: Deportivo Colonia
- 2005: Cerrito
- 2006: Indonesia U16
- 2007: Indonesia U19
- 2008: Indonesia U23
- 2021: Universidad San Martín
- * Club domestic league appearances and goals

César Payovich Pérez (born 10 December 1957) is a Uruguayan football manager and former player who played as a defender.

== Career ==
Born in Montevideo, Payovich played professionally for Defensor Sporting in the 1980s before retiring and becoming a manager. After starting his career in the youth categories of the very same club in 1991, he became an assistant manager in 1997.

Payovich left Defensor in 1999 to work as Ricardo Ortiz's assistant at Chilean club Cobresal. He returned to work with Ortiz at Defensor in 2002, being also an interim manager during that season.

In July 2005, after working at Deportivo Colonia, Payovich was named manager of Cerrito. In 2008, after a partnership between the Uruguayan Football Association and the Football Association of Indonesia was established, he became the manager of the latter's under-16 team.

Payovich was subsequently in charge of Indonesia's under-19 and under-23 squads. On 29 March 2021, he replaced Héctor Bidoglio at the helm of Peruvian side Universidad San Martín.
