= Ángelo Campos =

Peruvian footballer (born 1993)

Personal information
- Full name: Ángelo Ademir Campos Turriate
- Date of birth: 27 April 1993 (age 33)
- Place of birth: Lima, Peru
- Height: 1.86 m (6 ft 1 in)
- Position: Goalkeeper

Team information
- Current team: Alianza Lima
- Number: 1

Senior career*
Years	Team	Apps	(Gls)
2013–2015	Alianza Lima	0	(0)
2013–2014	→ San Alejandro (loan)	14	(0)
2014	→ Pacífico (loan)	29	(0)
2015–2016	Alianza Universidad	9	(0)
2016–2017	Juan Aurich	20	(0)
2017–2018	Alianza Lima	6	(0)
2019–2020	Melgar	29	(0)
2020–	Alianza Lima	103	(0)

International career
2013–	Peru U20	1	(1)
- * Club domestic league appearances and goals as of 29 December 2025

Ángelo Ademir Campos Turriate (born April 27, 1993) is a Peruvian professional footballer who plays for Club Alianza Lima as a goalkeeper.

== Club career ==
- Campos began his career with Alianza Lima. He spent the 2013 season on loan at San Alejandro.
- On July 1, 2014, Campos was loaned to Club Deportivo Pacífico FC.
- When the 2014 season concluded, he then went to Alianza Universidad de Huanuco for the 2015-2016 season.
- After little to no appearances at Alianza Universidad, he transferred to Juan Aurich for the 2016-2017 season.
- After he discovered Juan Aurich wasn't a good fit, he returned to Alianza Lima for the 2017-2018 season, winning the Peruvian Primera Division championship with them.
- After being a free-agent for the 2018-2019 season, FBC Melgar had acquired Campos.
- Finally, Ángelo Ademir Campos Turriate returns for a 3rd time to his 1st club: Club Alianza Lima.

== International career ==
Campos competed for the Peru under-20 team at the 2013 South American Youth Championship.

== Career statistics ==
As of match played 3 November 2024

Appearances and goals by club, season, and competition
Club	Season	League			National cup		Continental		Other		Total	
Club	Season	Division	Apps	Goals	Apps	Goals	Apps	Goals	Apps	Goals	Apps	Goals
Alianza Lima	2013	Peruvian Primera División	0	0	—		—		—		0	0
San Alejandro (loan)	2013	Peruvian Segunda División	14	0	—		—		—		14	0
Pacífico (loan)	2014	Peruvian Segunda División	29	0	—		—		—		29	0
Alianza Universidad	2015	Peruvian Segunda División	9	0	—		—		—		9	0
Juan Aurich	2016	Peruvian Primera División	20	0	—		—		—		20	0
Alianza Lima	2017	Peruvian Primera División	2	0	—		0	0	—		2	0
Alianza Lima	2018	Peruvian Primera División	4	0	—		4	0	—		8	0
Alianza Lima	Total		6	0	—		4	0	—		10	0
Melgar	2019	Peruvian Primera División	19	0	3	0	0	0	—		22	0
Melgar	2020	Peruvian Primera División	10	0	—		0	0	—		10	0
Melgar	Total		29	0	3	0	0	0	—		32	0
Alianza Lima	2021	Peruvian Primera División	22	0	1	0	—		—		23	0
Alianza Lima	2022	Peruvian Primera División	28	0	—		6	0	—		34	0
Alianza Lima	2023	Peruvian Primera División	24	0	—		5	0	—		29	0
Alianza Lima	2024	Peruvian Primera División	23	0	—		5	0	—		28	0
Alianza Lima	Total		97	0	1	0	16	0	—		114	0
Career total			204	0	4	0	20	0	0	0	228	0
