= Gabriel Morales =

Argentine footballer (born 1994)

Personal information
- Full name: Gabriel Jesús Morales
- Date of birth: 29 April 1994 (age 32)
- Place of birth: Rosario, Argentina
- Height: 1.78 m (5 ft 10 in)
- Position: Midfielder

Team information
- Current team: Santos

Youth career
- Rosario Central
- 2014–2015: Atlético de Rafaela

Senior career*
Years	Team	Apps	(Gls)
2015–2017	Atlético de Rafaela	27	(2)
2017–2020	Boca Unidos	35	(8)
2020–2021	Almagro	13	(1)
2021–2025	Boca Unidos	70	(19)
2025–2026	Unión Comercio	22	(3)
2026–	Santos	0	(0)
- * Club domestic league appearances and goals as of 20:50, 10 March 2026 (UTC)

Gabriel Jesús Morales (born 29 April 1994) is an Argentine professional footballer who plays as a midfielder for Liga 2 club Santos.

== Career ==
Morales began in the academy of Rosario Central, before joining Atlético de Rafaela's youth in 2014. He made his Argentine Primera División debut for Rafaela on 10 April 2015 against Crucero del Norte and scored his first career goal in the process. He made a further fifteen appearances and scored one more goal during the 2015 season. Rafaela were relegated at the end of the 2016–17 season, Morales had made just two league appearances during that season and was subsequently released in July 2017. He then joined second-tier team Boca Unidos in August, and made his debut for them on 7 October versus Deportivo Riestra.

After three seasons with Boca Unidos, Morales departed in August 2020 to Almagro.

== Career statistics ==
As of 29 August 2020.

Club statistics
Club	Season	League			Cup		League Cup		Continental		Other		Total	
Club	Season	Division	Apps	Goals	Apps	Goals	Apps	Goals	Apps	Goals	Apps	Goals	Apps	Goals
Atlético de Rafaela	2015	Primera División	16	2	1	0	—		—		0	0	17	2
Atlético de Rafaela	2016	Primera División	9	0	0	0	—		—		0	0	9	0
Atlético de Rafaela	2016–17	Primera División	2	0	1	0	—		—		0	0	3	0
Atlético de Rafaela	Total		27	2	2	0	—		—		0	0	29	2
Boca Unidos	2017–18	Primera B Nacional	6	1	0	0	—		—		0	0	6	1
Boca Unidos	2018–19	Torneo Federal A	10	0	1	0	—		—		0	0	11	0
Boca Unidos	2019–20	Torneo Federal A	19	0	4	0	—		—		0	0	23	0
Boca Unidos	Total		35	8	5	0	—		—		0	0	40	8
Almagro	2020–21	Primera B Nacional	0	0	0	0	—		—		0	0	0	0
Career total			62	10	7	0	—		—		0	0	69	10
