= Juan Alayo =

Peruvian football manager (born 1985)

Personal information
- Full name: Juan César Alayo Vergara
- Date of birth: 18 November 1985 (age 40)
- Place of birth: Callao, Peru
- Height: 1.70 m (5 ft 7 in)
- Position: Left-back

Youth career
- Sporting Cristal

Senior career*
| Years | Team | Apps | (Gls) |
| 2003–2004 | Sport Boys | | |
| 2005 | Universidad San Marcos | | |
| 2006–2007 | La Peña | | |
| 2008 | UTC | | |
| 2009 | IDUNSA | 20 | (3) |
| 2010 | León de Huánuco | | |
| 2011 | Real Garcilaso | | |
| 2011 | Franciscano San Román | | |
| 2012 | Sport Áncash | | |
| 2012 | Binacional | | |
| 2013–2014 | Unión Fuerza Minera | | |
| 2015 | Juventud América Cañete | | |

Managerial career
- 2017–2021: Sport Boys (youth)
- 2021: Sport Boys (interim)
- 2022: Sport Boys (assistant)
- 2022: Sport Boys (interim)
- 2022: Sport Boys
- 2023: Walter Ormeño
- 2023: Sport Boys (interim)
- 2024: Sport Boys
- * Club domestic league appearances and goals

Juan César Alayo Vergara (born 18 November 1985) is a Peruvian football manager and former player who played as a left-back.

== Playing career ==
Born Callao, Alayo started playing for Sport Boys. He spent the entirety of his career in his home country, representing Universidad San Marcos, La Peña Sporting, Universidad Técnica de Cajamarca, IDUNSA, León de Huánuco, Real Garcilaso, Franciscano San Román, Sport Áncash, Binacional, Unión Fuerza Minera and Juventud América de Cañete. He retired with the latter in 2015, aged 30.

== Managerial career ==
Alayo started his managerial career in 2017 with Sport Boys' youth categories. On 9 May 2021, he was named interim manager of the first team after the departure of Teddy Cardama, and was in charge of the side for one match (a 0–2 loss against Alianza Lima) before returning to his previous role.

On 26 February 2022, Alayo was again named interim manager of Sport Boys, after Ytalo Manzo left the club. He returned to his assistant role after the appointment of Walter Fiori, but was again named interim on 11 April after Fiori left.

On 3 May 2022, Alayo was appointed manager of Sport Boys on a permanent basis. Despite leaving in November when his contract expired, he returned to the club on 1 May 2023, now as head of the youth categories, and was again named interim manager seven days later, after Guillermo Sanguinetti left.

Alayo became an interim again in April 2024, after the departure of Fernando Gamboa, and was definitely named manager on 7 June. He resigned from the club on 21 September.
