= Arón Sánchez =

Peruvian footballer (born 2003)

Personal information
- Full name: José Arón Sánchez Flores
- Date of birth: 4 May 2003 (age 23)
- Place of birth: Callao, Lima, Peru
- Height: 1.85 m (6 ft 1 in)
- Position: Centre-back

Team information
- Current team: Academia Cantolao
- Number: 3

Youth career
- –2017: Esther Grande
- 2018–2020: Academia Cantolao

Senior career*
Years	Team	Apps	(Gls)
2020–	Academia Cantolao	88	(7)

International career^{‡}
2019	Peru U17	4	(0)
2020-2022	Peru U20	14	(0)
- * Club domestic league appearances and goals as of 12 August 2023 ‡ National team caps and goals as of 05:00, 22 September 2020 (UTC)

José Arón Sánchez Flores (born 4 May 2003) is a Peruvian footballer who plays as a centre-back for Academia Cantolao.

== Career statistics ==
=== Club ===
As of 12 August 2023.

Club	Season	League			Cup		Continental		Total	
Club	Season	Division	Apps	Goals	Apps	Goals	Apps	Goals	Apps	Goals
Academia Cantolao	2020	Peruvian Primera División	20	3	—		—		20	3
Academia Cantolao	2021	Peruvian Primera División	24	2	—		—		24	2
Academia Cantolao	2022	Peruvian Primera División	23	0	—		—		23	0
Academia Cantolao	2023	Peruvian Primera División	21	2	—		—		21	2
Career total			88	7	0	0	0	0	88	7
