= Ayacucho FC =

Association football club

Ayacucho
- Full name: Ayacucho Fútbol Club
- Nicknames: Los Ñes; Los Zorros; Los Guerreros Wari; Los Gasíferos; La Fuerza de los Andes; Los Libertadores
- Founded: August 9, 2008; 17 years ago
- Ground: Estadio Ciudad de Cumaná
- Capacity: 12,000
- President: Rolando Bellido
- Manager: Sergio Castellanos
- League: Liga 2
- 2025: Liga 1, 17th of 19 (relegated)
- Website: https://www.facebook.com/ayacufc/
Home colours	Away colours

Ayacucho Fútbol Club, more popularly known as Ayacucho, is a Peruvian professional football club located in Ayacucho, Peru. The club finished as runner-up in the Second Division in 2008. The club currently participates in the Liga 2.

== History ==
=== Beginnings ===
Founded in 2008 as Club Inti Gas Deportes Ayacucho, the club took over from Olímpico Somos Perú, which was then playing in the Second division. Under the guidance of Colombian coach Édgar Ospina, they reached the top flight as runners-up in the second division.

=== Inti Gas ===
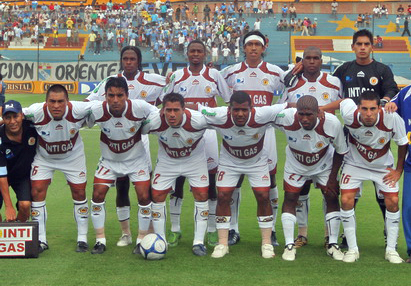
Inti Gas Deportes, before playing against Sporting Cristal in 2009.

In 2008, the club received sponsorship from the gas provider Inti Gas. They relocated to Huamanga, Ayacucho but they decided to play their home games in Ica because another Second Division team already had their home ground in Ayacucho and security issues that have risen. They were runners-up of the 2008 Second Division and were promoted to the 2009 First Division. Ayacucho has recently sought to permanently keep the club in its city.

=== Ayacucho ===
In 2014, they officially changed their name to Ayacucho FC. 2020 brought the start of Ayacucho's golden age. The club placed 9th in the Torneo Apertura, of the 2020 season, but won the Torneo Clausura for the first time, after beating Sporting Cristal in the Fase 2 final. However, because both teams drew on points, they entered the semi-finals of play-offs, against Sporting Cristal again. This time, Ayacucho lost 2–6 on aggregate, and placed third in the league. They would qualify for the Copa Libertadores for the first time but were eliminated by Grêmio in the second stage.

In the 2021 season, Ayacucho barely qualified for the Copa Sudamericana and qualified for the Group Stage, after defeating Sport Boys in the first stage. Ayacucho placed third is its group and was eliminated.

2022 would start the downfall of Ayacucho. In the Torneo Apertura of the 2022 season, Ayacucho placed last. On the aggregate table, they placed 17th, going to the relegation play-off, their only hope in staying in the Liga 1. Ayacucho played with Unión Comercio, and lost 3–0 in the first leg but came back 2–1 in the second but still lost 2–4 on aggregate, getting relegated to the Liga 2.

In 2024, Ayacucho benefited from a court decision that required the Peruvian Football Federation to reinstate the club in the 1st division from the 2025 season. But the experience was short-lived, the team was relegated back to the 2nd division at the end of the season.

== Stadium ==
Ayacucho's original stadium was Estadio Ciudad de Cumaná, which had a capacity of 12,000. However, the stadium was demolished in 2024 to construct the new Estadio Vencedores de Ayacucho, which will have a capacity of 20,000 and be completed in late 2025. The new stadium will be part of the new Complejo Deportivo Los Vencedores de Ayaucho and will be the home ground of Ayacucho FC. Until the stadium is complete, Ayacucho plays at Estadio Manuel Eloy Molina Robles located in Huanta.

== Current squad ==
As of 1 September 2025

Note: Flags indicate national team as defined under FIFA eligibility rules; some limited exceptions apply. Players may hold more than one non-FIFA nationality.

No.	Pos.	Nation	Player
1	GK	PER	Paolo Izaguirre
3	DF	PER	Manuel Ganoza
4	DF	PER	Alonso Yovera
5	DF	PER	Alonso Tamariz
6	MF	PER	Jime Tuesta
8	MF	PER	Diego Ramírez
9	FW	PER	Jiries Salem
10	MF	PER	Marvin Ríos (Captain)
12	DF	PER	Dylan Caro
14	FW	PER	Gustavo Loayza
15	FW	PER	Piero Ratto
16	MF	PER	Jean Pier Vílchez
18	MF	PAR	Derlis Orué
20	MF	PER	Carlos Correa
21	GK	PER	Fabián Palomino
22	DF	VEN	Jonathan Bilbao
23	GK	COL	Juan Valencia

No.	Pos.	Nation	Player
24	FW	URU	Maximiliano Pérez
25	DF	PER	José Ataupillco
26	DF	PER	Hans Aquino
27	FW	PER	Kenyi Barrios
29	DF	PER	Jean Franco Falconí
33	FW	PER	Royer Salcedo
35	FW	PER	Kevin Ferreyra
55	DF	PER	Brackson León
66	MF	PER	Adrián de la Cruz
77	FW	COL	Juan Lucumí
88	MF	PER	Hideyoshi Arakaki
96	MF	PER	Pedro Peral
99	FW	ARG	Franco Caballero
—	GK	PER	Oscar Cabrera
—	DF	PER	Sthefano Muñoz

== Honours ==
=== Senior titles ===
Keys

- Record
- ^{(s)} Shared record

Type	Competition	Titles	Runner-up	Winning years	Runner-up years
National (League)	Segunda División	—	1	—	2008
Half-year / Short tournament (League)	Torneo Clausura	1	—	2020	—

=== Under-20 team ===
Type	Competition	Titles	Runner-up	Winning years	Runner-up years
National (League)	Torneo de Promoción y Reservas	—	1	—	2022

== Results ==
=== Performance in CONMEBOL competitions ===
- Copa Sudamericana: 4 appearances

2012: First Stage
2013: First Stage
2014: First Stage
2022: Group stage

- Copa Libertadores: 1 appearance

2021: Second Stage

== Managers ==
- (Peru) Miguel Guzmán 2008
- (Colombia) Édgar Ospina 2008–2009
- (Colombia) José Torres 2010
- (Colombia) Édgar Ospina 2010–2012
- (Colombia) César Tabárez 2013
- (Paraguay) Rolando Chilavert 2013–2014
- (Argentina) Carlos Leeb 2014–2015
- (Peru) Freddy García 2015
- (Argentina) Hugo Iervasi 2015
- (Paraguay) Nolberto Tullo 2015
- (Colombia) Édgar Ospina 2015–2016
- (Argentina) Carlos Leeb 2016
- (Peru) Francisco Melgar 2017
- (Argentina) Carlos Leeb 2017–2018
- (Peru) Duilio Cisneros 2018
- (Uruguay) Mario Viera 2018–2019
- (Argentina) Gerardo Ameli 2020
- (Argentina) Walter Fiori 2021
- (Uruguay) Alejandro Apud 2022
- (Argentina) Marcelo Vivas 2022
- (Colombia) Édgar Ospina 2022
- (Brazil) Oseias de Souza 2023
- (Argentina) Sergio Castellanos 2023
- (Argentina) José Collatti 2024
- (Colombia) Édgar Ospina 2024–2025
- (Peru) Gino Reyes 2025
- (Argentina) Luis Islas 2025
- (Argentina) Gerardo Piersanti 2025
- (Argentina) Sergio Castellanos 2025–

== Other sports ==
=== Women's football ===
Type	Competition	Titles	Runner-up	Winning years	Runner-up years
Regional (League)	Región VI	1	—	2018	—
