= Jesús Cisneros =

Peruvian footballer (born 1979)

Personal information
- Full name: Jesús Eduardo Cisneros Ríos
- Date of birth: 18 March 1979 (age 47)
- Place of birth: Huancayo, Peru
- Height: 1.83 m (6 ft 0 in)
- Position: Goalkeeper

Team information
- Current team: Cienciano (goalkeeper coach)

Senior career*
Years	Team	Apps	(Gls)
1998–1999	Virgen de Chapi		
2000	Unión Minas		
2001	Bella Esperanza		
2002	Estudiantes de Medicina		
2003	Alianza Lima		
2004–2008	Cienciano		
2009	Sport Huancayo	43	(0)
2010	Alianza Lima	1	(0)
2011	CNI	30	(0)
2012–2013	Cienciano	47	(0)
2014–2015	León de Huánuco	39	(0)
2016	César Vallejo	1	(0)
2016–2017	Juan Aurich	49	(0)
2018	Atlético Grau	16	(0)
2019	Juan Aurich	22	(0)

Managerial career
- 2022: Cienciano (interim)
- * Club domestic league appearances and goals

Jesús Eduardo Cisneros Ríos (born 18 March 1979) is a Peruvian football coach and former player who played as a goalkeeper. He is the current goalkeeper coach of Cienciano.

== Club career ==
Cisneros started his career in the 2000 Torneo Descentralizado season with Unión Minas.

He then played for Estudiantes de Medicina in the 2002 season.

The following season, he joined Alianza Lima, but was only there for one season.

Then in January 2004 Cisneros joined Cienciano.

== Honours ==
Alianza Lima

- Torneo Descentralizado: 2003

Cienciano

- Recopa Sudamericana: 2004
- Apertura: 2005
- Clausura: 2006
