= Édgar Ospina =

Colombian football manager (born 1956)

Personal information
- Full name: Édgar de Jesús Ospina Echeverri
- Date of birth: 12 January 1956 (age 70)
- Place of birth: Cartago, Colombia
- Height: 1.78 m (5 ft 10 in)

Managerial career
- Years: Team
- 1995–1996: Alianza Lima (youth)
- 1997: Bella Esperanza
- 1998–1999: Alianza Lima
- 2000: Atlético Bucaramanga
- 2000: LDU Quito
- 2003: Cienciano
- 2004: Grau-Estudiantes
- 2004: Deportivo Wanka
- 2005: Aris Limassol
- 2006: América Cochahuayco
- 2007: Universitario
- 2007: Total Clean
- 2008: Deportivo Pereira
- 2008: Trujillanos
- 2008–2009: Inti Gas
- 2010: Cienciano
- 2010–2012: Inti Gas
- 2013: León de Huánuco
- 2013: Unión Comercio
- 2015–2016: Ayacucho
- 2022: Ayacucho
- 2025: Ayacucho

Édgar de Jesús Ospina Echeverri (born 12 January 1956) is a Colombian football manager.

== Career ==
Born in Cartago, Ospina worked as a fitness coach for Deportes Quindío, Millonarios, Independiente Santa Fe and Cúcuta Deportivo in the 1980s. He moved to Peru in 1995, to work as a youth coach for Alianza Lima.

Ospina's first senior managerial experience occurred in 1997, as he led Segunda División side Bella Esperanza to the second position, missing out promotion by one point. In June 1998, he returned to Alianza, now as a first team manager.

Ospina was sacked by Alianza on 15 November 1999, and returned to his home country after taking over Atlético Bucaramanga in 2000. Later in the year, he also worked at Ecuadorian side LDU Quito, but was replaced by Fernando Díaz; the club was ultimately relegated.

Ospina started the 2003 season in charge of Cienciano back in Peru, but was sacked in May of that year. During the 2004 campaign, he worked at Primera División sides Grau-Estudiantes and Deportivo Wanka, with both sides suffering relegation.

After a brief period at Cypriot side Aris Limassol in 2005, Ospina was named manager of América Cochahuayco in July 2006. In 2007, he replaced Jorge Amado Nunes at the helm of Universitario de Deportes; initially an interim, he was permanently named manager in March but was later dismissed in July. He finished the year at Total Clean.

On 11 January 2008, Ospina was appointed Deportivo Pereira manager, but was sacked in May. He worked at Venezuelan Segunda División side Trujillanos later in the year, before returning to Peru with Inti Gas.

Ospina led Inti Gas to the top tier, and was close to a continental qualification during the 2009 campaign. He returned to Cienciano in January 2010, but was sacked on 4 May.

Ospina returned to Inti Gas on 19 July 2010, and left the club in December 2012. He was subsequently named in charge of León de Huánuco on 11 December of that year, before leaving on a mutual agreement the following 11 April.

Ospina was appointed Unión Comercio manager on 16 May 2013, but resigned on 26 September. On 28 October 2015, after more than two years without coaching, he returned to Inti Gas (now named Ayacucho), but resigned on 9 July 2016.

On 8 August 2022, Ospina returned to Ayacucho after six years without coaching.
