= Aimery Pinga =

Swiss footballer (born 1998)

Personal information
- Full name: Aimery Pinga Maria
- Date of birth: January 6, 1998 (age 28)
- Place of birth: Fribourg, Switzerland
- Height: 1.85 m (6 ft 1 in)
- Position: Forward

Team information
- Current team: Bulle
- Number: 21

Youth career
- 2006–2009: FC Schönberg
- 2009–2012: Fribourg
- 2012–2016: Young Boys
- 2016–2017: Sion

Senior career*
Years	Team	Apps	(Gls)
2017–2021	Sion	15	(2)
2017–2021	Sion U21	14	(8)
2018–2019	→ Grasshopper (loan)	19	(2)
2019–2020	→ Andorra (loan)	4	(0)
2021–2022	Virton	6	(0)
2022–2023	Neuchâtel Xamax	19	(2)
2023–2024	Rapperswil-Jona	11	(2)
2024–	Bulle	24	(12)

International career
2015	Switzerland U18	2	(1)
2017	Switzerland U19	1	(1)
- * Club domestic league appearances and goals as of 22 June 2025

Aimery Pinga Maria (born 6 January 1998), is a Swiss professional footballer who plays as a forward for Bulle in Swiss Promotion League.

== Professional career ==
Born in Fribourg, Pinga joined FC Sion in 2016. Pinga made his professional debut for Sion in a 1-0 Swiss Super League loss to Young Boys on 7 May 2017.

== International career ==
Pinga was born in Switzerland and is of Congolese and Angolan descent. Pinga is a youth international for Switzerland.
