= Leonardo Morales (footballer, born 1960) =

Peruvian footballer and manager (born 1960)

Personal information
- Full name: Leonardo Morales Bazán
- Date of birth: 16 May 1960
- Place of birth: Lima, Peru

Youth career
- Sporting Cristal

Senior career*
Years	Team	Apps	(Gls)
1981–1983	Sporting Cristal		
1984	Deportivo Huancayo		
1985	Sporting Cristal		
- Aurich-Cañaña
- Unión Huaral
- Alianza Atlético
- Unión Minas
- Deportivo Pucallpa
- Alcides Vigo
- Deportivo AELU
1997	Guardia Republicana		

Managerial career
- 2004–2008: Unión Tarapoto
- 2010: Unión Comercio
- 2011: Huallaga FBC
- Deportivo Bellavista
- 2013: Fuerza Minera
- 2013–2014: U. San Martín (assistant)
- 2014: Fuerza Minera
- 2017: Walter Ormeño
- 2017: Alfonso Ugarte
- 2019: Unión Comercio (assistant)
- 2020: Unión Comercio
- 2021: Comerciantes Unidos
- 2022: Credicoop San Cristóbal
- 2023: Bentín Tacna Heroica
- 2024: Unión Comercio (assistant)
- 2024: Cultural Volante
- 2025: Juventud Bellavista
- 2025: Las Palmas de Chota
- * Club domestic league appearances and goals

Leonardo Morales Bazán (born 16 May 1960) is a Peruvian football manager and former player.

== Playing career ==
Trained at Sporting Cristal, Leonardo Morales played there from 1981 to 1985 with a break at Deportivo Huancayo in 1984. He ended his career at Guardia Republicana in 1997.

== Managerial career ==
Morales completed his coaching training in Argentina. He managed Unión Tarapoto between 2004 and 2008 before joining Unión Comercio, where he won the Copa Perú in 2010. In 2013, he accompanied Julio César Uribe as an assistant at the Universidad San Martín. He returned to Unión Comercio in 2020.

== Honours ==
=== Manager ===
Unión Comercio

- Copa Perú: 2010
