= Piero Ratto =

Peruvian footballer (born 1998)

Personal information
- Full name: Piero Luis Ratto Caballero
- Date of birth: 11 May 1998 (age 28)
- Place of birth: Lima, Peru
- Height: 1.67 m (5 ft 6 in)
- Positions: Winger; attacking midfielder

Team information
- Current team: Ayacucho
- Number: 15

Youth career
- Esther Grande

Senior career*
Years	Team	Apps	(Gls)
2017	Juan Aurich	6	(0)
2018–2021	Sport Boys	67	(4)
2021–2022	Deportivo Municipal	34	(3)
2023	ADT	7	(0)
2023	Deportivo Llacuabamba	5	(0)
2024	Deportivo Coopsol	12	(0)
2025–	Ayacucho	6	(0)
- * Club domestic league appearances and goals as of 30 December 2025

Piero Luis Ratto Caballero (born 11 May 1998) is a Peruvian footballer who plays as a winger or attacking midfielder for Peruvian Primera División side Ayacucho FC.

== Club career ==
=== Juan Aurich ===
Ratto is a product of Esther Grande. Due to his good performances during 2016 where Ratto's team won the U18 league - and Ratto was nominated for the best player of the year - and his selection for the Peruvian U20 national team, he attracted interest from several club's, among others Alianza Lima from his hometown, Lima. However, Ratto preferred to move outside the capital at the age of 18 without his family and joined Juan Aurich in January 2017, the club he had been rumored to for two years. Ratto signed a two-year professional contract with Juan Aurich.

He got his debut for Juan Aurich and in the Peruvian Primera División on 26 February 2017 against Universitario de Deportes, playing the final minutes in a goalless draw. However, Ratto was only able to make six appearances for the club, before leaving at the end of the year.

=== Sport Boys ===
Ratto joined Sport Boys in January 2018 in the hope of more playing time. After his debut on 1 April 2018 against FBC Melgar, he became a regular starter for the team. After a good season with 21 appearances and two goals, he signed a new deal with the club at the end of 2018 for one further season. In the 2019 season, Ratto also played 21 games for the team and scored one goal.

=== Later career ===
On 26 June 2021, Ratto officially signed with fellow league club Deportivo Municipal. He made a total of 34 appearances for the club, before his departure at the end of 2022. On 8 December 2022 it was confirmed, that Ratto had signed for ADT. He left the club at the end of June 2023.

In July 2023, Ratto signed with Peruvian Segunda División side Deportivo Llacuabamba. In March 2024, he signed for Deportivo Coopsol.

In January 2025, Ratto joined Peruvian Primera División side Ayacucho FC.
