= Guillermo Esteves =

Peruvian football manager

Personal information
- Full name: Guillermo Mariano Esteves Salguero
- Date of birth: 16 August 1986 (age 40)
- Place of birth: Lima, Peru

Managerial career
- Years: Team
- 2007–2012: Cantolao (youth)
- 2012: Cantolao
- 2013–2014: Unión Huaral
- 2015: Cantolao
- 2016: Atlético Grau
- 2017: Sport Loreto
- 2018: Cantolao
- 2019: Paz Soldán
- 2021: Real Sociedad Chugay
- 2022: Walter Ormeño
- 2022: Cantolao (interim)

Guillermo Mariano Esteves Salguero (born 16 August 1986) is a Peruvian football manager.

== Career ==
Born in Lima, Esteves joined Cantolao in 2006, as an assistant of the youth setup. In the following year, he was named manager of the youth sides, being in charge of several youth categories before being named at the helm of the first team in 2012.

In 2013, Esteves was in charge of Unión Huaral, finishing second in the 2013 Copa Perú but being sacked in June 2014. In 2015, he returned to Cantolao, again finishing second in the year's Cup.

After spending a part of the 2016 season in charge of Atlético Grau, Esteves took over Sport Loreto for the 2017 campaign. On 3 May 2018, he returned to Cantolao for a third spell, with the club now in the Primera División, in the place of Carlos Silvestri.

On 27 October 2018, Esteves was sacked by Cantolao. He then worked at Paz Soldán in 2019, before being named in charge of Walter Ormeño de Cañete for the 2020 campaign, but was unable to manage the latter.

In September 2021, Esteves was named manager of Real Sociedad Chugay for the 2021 Copa Perú. He left in the following month as the club was knocked out, and returned to Walter Ormeño in February 2022, managing the side until May.

In June 2022, Esteves rejoined Cantolao for a fourth spell, now as an interim, again replacing Silvestri. He left the managerial role after the appointment of Alejandro Apud.
