= Hugo Vilches =

Chilean football manager and player

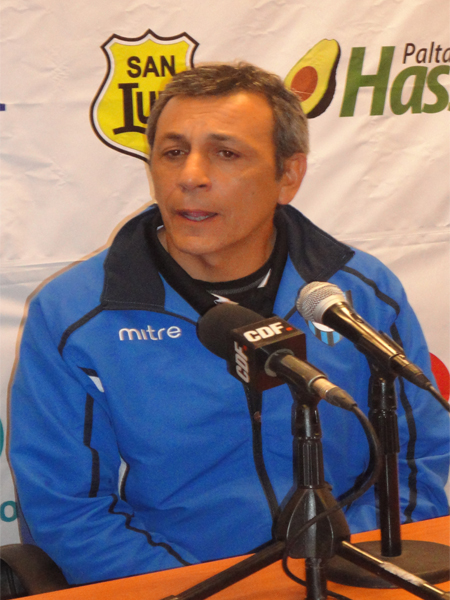
- Vilches as manager of Huachipato in 2015

Personal information
- Full name: Hugo Alejandro Héctor Vilches Manuguian
- Date of birth: 27 February 1969 (age 57)
- Place of birth: Santiago, Chile
- Position: Forward

Youth career
- Universidad de Chile

Senior career*
Years	Team	Apps	(Gls)
1988–1990	Universidad de Chile	17	(6)
1991	Rangers	18	(2)

Managerial career
- 2000–2002: Banyoles (youth)
- 2002–2003: Porqueres
- 2004–2005: Club Oriente
- 2005–2008: Universidad de Chile (youth)
- 2008–2009: Chile U15
- 2008–2009: Chile U18
- 2009–2010: Universidad de Chile (youth)
- 2012: Santiago Wanderers (assistant)
- 2013–2014: Barnechea
- 2015: Huachipato
- 2016–2018: Audax Italiano
- 2019: Deportes Temuco
- 2019: Curicó Unido
- * Club domestic league appearances and goals

Hugo Alejandro Héctor Vilches Manuguian (born February 27, 1969) is a Chilean football manager and former player who played as a forward.

== Playing career ==
A product of Universidad de Chile, Vilches spent three seasons with them between 1988 and 1990, winning the 1989 Segunda División, the only time that the club has been in the second level. He also played for Rangers de Talca in 1991.

== Coaching career ==
Viclhes began his career in Spain. Back in Chile, he worked for Club Oriente de Fútbol from Chicureo, Santiago in 2004–05.

After, he worked for the Universidad de Chile youth ranks, taking part of the training of players such as Igor Lichnovsky, Ángelo Henríquez, Sebastián Martínez, among others. He also was the coach of the Chile youth teams at under-15 and under-18 levels.

In 2012, he served as assistant coach of Arturo Salah in Santiago Wanderers. The next season, he assumed as head coach of Barnechea in the Primera B.

The next years, he worked as head coach of Huachipato, Audax Italiano, Deportes Temuco and Curicó Unido.

== Personal life ==
Hugo is the father of the footballer Diego Vilches Navarro.
