= José Espinoza (footballer) =

Peruvian-Italian footballer (born 1974)

Personal information
- Full name: José Julio Espinoza Valeriani
- Date of birth: 23 June 1974 (age 52)
- Place of birth: Lima, Peru
- Height: 1.85 m (6 ft 1 in)
- Position: Midfielder

Team information
- Current team: Universidad San Martín (manager)

Senior career*
Years	Team	Apps	(Gls)
1991–1997	Universitario		
1998	Dundee United	1	(0)
1998–1999	Sporting Cristal		
2000	Universitario		
2001	Estudiantes de Medicina		
2002	Melgar		

International career
1996	Peru U23		

Managerial career
- 2012–2021: Universidad San Martín (youth)
- 2021: Universidad San Martín (caretaker)
- 2021–: Universidad San Martín
- * Club domestic league appearances and goals

José Julio Espinoza Valeriani (born 23 June 1974) is a Peruvian football manager and former player who played as a midfielder. He is the current manager of Universidad San Martín.

Espinoza also holds an Italian passport.

== Club career ==
Born in Lima, Espinoza played once for Scottish side Dundee United in August 1998, returning to Peru to sign for Sporting Cristal. From here, he played for a number of Peruvian sides, including Universitario de Deportes, Estudiantes de Medicina and FBC Melgar.

After retiring, Espinoza worked in the youth categories of Universidad San Martín. On 15 March 2021, after the departure of Héctor Bidoglio, he was named first team manager.
