= Jostin Alarcón =

Peruvian footballer (born 2002)

Personal information
- Full name: Jostin Alexis Alarcón Paquiyauri
- Date of birth: 12 July 2002 (age 24)
- Place of birth: Lima, Peru
- Height: 1.80 m (5 ft 11 in)
- Position: Forward

Team information
- Current team: Sport Boys
- Number: 99

Youth career
- –2021: Deportivo Municipal

Senior career*
Years	Team	Apps	(Gls)
2021–2022	Sport Boys	56	(7)
2023–2025	Sporting Cristal	69	(5)
2025–	Sport Boys	12	(2)

International career^{‡}
2022–	Peru U23	1	(0)
- * Club domestic league appearances and goals as of 30 December 2025 ‡ National team caps and goals as of 05:00, 1 September 2022 (UTC)

Jostin Alexis Alarcón Paquiyauri (born 12 July 2002) is a Peruvian footballer who plays as a forward for Sport Boys.

== Career statistics ==
=== Club ===
As of 3 November 2024.

Club	Division	League			Cup		Continental		Total	
Club	Division	Season	Apps	Goals	Apps	Goals	Apps	Goals	Apps	Goals
Sport Boys	Peruvian Primera División	2021	25	2	3	0	–		28	2
Sport Boys	Peruvian Primera División	2022	31	5	–		2	0	33	5
Sport Boys	Total		56	7	3	0	2	0	61	7
Sporting Cristal	Peruvian Primera División	2023	28	1	–		9	0	37	1
Sporting Cristal	Peruvian Primera División	2024	29	4	–		1	0	30	4
Sporting Cristal	Total		57	5	0	0	10	0	67	5
Career total			113	12	3	0	12	0	128	12
