= Walter Fiori =

Argentine football manager (born 1961)

Personal information
- Full name: Walter Omar Fiori
- Date of birth: 19 January 1961 (age 65)
- Place of birth: Mar del Plata, Argentina
- Position: Forward

Senior career*
Years	Team	Apps	(Gls)
1980–1985	Tigre		
1985–1987	Talleres	50	(13)
1987	Junior	0	(0)
1987–1989	Racing Club	5	(0)
1989–1990	Chaco For Ever	1	(0)
1990–1991	Instituto	24	(7)
1991–1992	Tigre		
1992–1993	San Miguel		
1993–1995	Colegiales		
1995–1996	Deportivo Italiano	2	(0)
1996	Colegiales		
1997	El Porvenir	13	(0)

Managerial career
- 2007–2009: Sporting Cristal (assistant)
- 2007: Sporting Cristal (interim)
- 2010–2013: LDU Quito (youth)
- 2014–2015: San Lorenzo (youth)
- 2015–2016: Ituzaingó (youth)
- 2016–2017: Ituzaingó
- 2017: Sport Rosario (assistant)
- 2017: Deportivo Municipal (assistant)
- 2018–2019: Deportes Antofagasta (assistant)
- 2019: Deportes Antofagasta (interim)
- 2019: UTC (assistant)
- 2020: Ayacucho (assistant)
- 2021: Ayacucho
- 2022: Sport Boys
- * Club domestic league appearances and goals

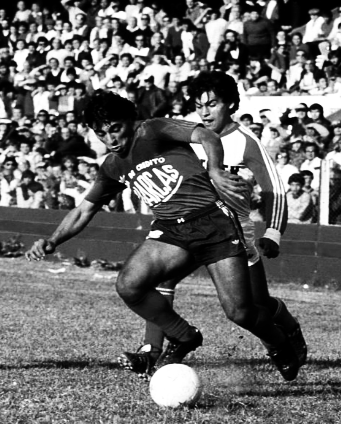
Walter Fiori in a Tigre-Los Andes match played on April 23, 1983

Walter Omar Fiori (born 19 January 1961) is an Argentine football manager and former player who played as a forward.

== Career ==
Born in Mar del Plata, Fiori notably represented Primera División sides Tigre, Talleres de Córdoba, Racing Club, Chaco For Ever and Instituto. He retired in 1997 at the age of 36, with El Porvenir.

After retiring, Fiori joined Sporting Cristal's technical staff in 2007 as an assistant. He was also an interim after the dismissal of Jorge Sampaoli, but returned to his previous role after the arrival of Juan Carlos Oblitas.

Fiori subsequently worked with Edgardo Bauza at LDU Quito and San Lorenzo, being in charge of the youth setup. In 2015, he joined Ituzaingó; initially assigned to the youth categories, he was named first team manager on 19 June 2016, but left the following 3 January after accepting an offer to become Gerardo Ameli's assistant at Sport Rosario.

Fiori continued to work with Ameli at Deportivo Municipal and Deportes Antofagasta, being an interim manager of the latter in May 2019 after Ameli left. In September 2019, he moved to Universidad Técnica de Cajamarca, also as an assistant.

In 2020, Fiori returned to work with Ameli at Ayacucho FC. On 18 December of that year, he was named manager of the club for the 2021 campaign.
