= Héctor Bidoglio =

Venezuelan footballer and manager

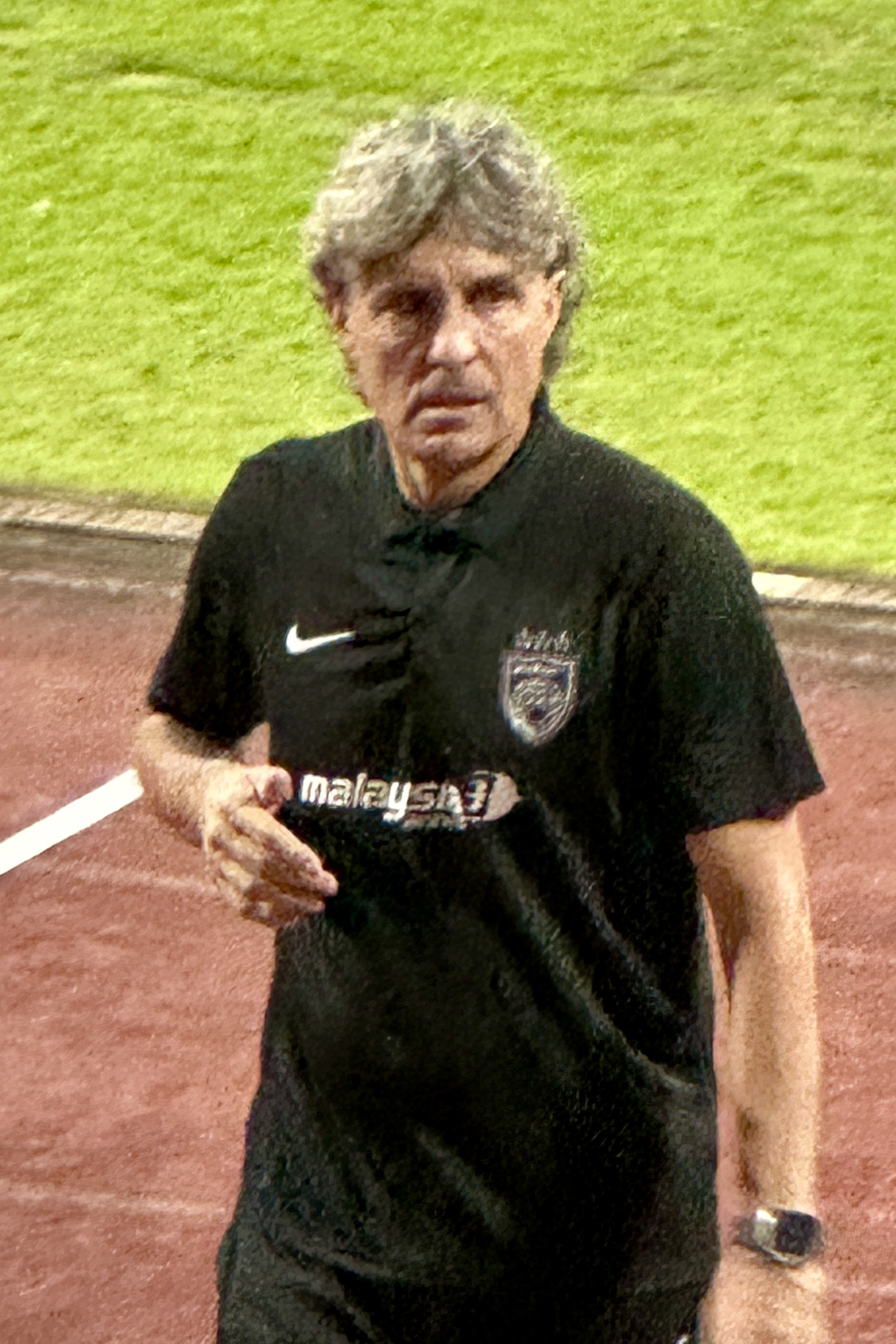
- Héctor with Johor Darul Ta'zim in 2024

Personal information
- Full name: Héctor Pablo Bidoglio
- Date of birth: 5 February 1968 (age 58)
- Place of birth: Rosario, Argentina
- Height: 1.76 m (5 ft 9 in)
- Position: Midfielder

Senior career*
Years	Team	Apps	(Gls)
1990–1992	Newell's Old Boys		
1992	Fernandez Vial		
1992–1993	Deportes Concepción		
1993–1994	Minervén		
1998–2000	Caracas FC	7	(1)
2000–2002	Deportivo Italia	4	(0)
2002–2003	Trujillanos	29	(1)
2003–2005	Deportivo Táchira	16	(0)
2005	Al-Arabi		
2005–2006	Mineros de Guayana	13	(0)
2006	Zulia	15	(2)
2006–2008	Estudiantes Mérida	27	(3)
2008	Thanh Hóa	9	(2)

International career
1999–2000	Venezuela	23	(0)

Managerial career
- 2013–2016: Newell's Old Boys (assistant)
- 2016–2017: Colón (staff)
- 2017–2018: Newell's Old Boys (youth coordinator)
- 2018–2019: Newell's Old Boys
- 2019–2021: Universidad San Martín
- 2021–2022: Aucas
- 2022: Johor Darul Ta'zim
- 2023: Johor Darul Ta'zim (technical director)
- 2024–2025: Johor Darul Ta'zim
- 2026: Deportivo La Guaira
- * Club domestic league appearances and goals

Héctor Pablo Bidoglio (born 5 February 1968) is a professional football coach and former player who played as a midfielder.

Born in Argentina, Bidoglio made a total number of 17 appearances for the Venezuela national team between 1999 and 2000.

== Managerial statistics ==
As of 1 October 2026

Managerial record by team and tenure
Team	Nat.	From	To	Record					Ref.
Team	Nat.	From	To	G	W	D	L	Win %	Ref.
Newell's Old Boys	(Argentina)	25 November 2018	22 April 2019	15	5	5	5	33.33	
Universidad San Martin	(Peru)	14 December 2019	15 March 2021	28	10	7	11	35.71	
SD Aucas	(Ecuador)	16 March 2021	17 April 2022	42	15	12	15	35.71	
Johor Darul Ta'zim	(Malaysia)	28 July 2022	30 November 2022	20	16	3	1	80.00	
Johor Darul Ta'zim	(Malaysia)	29 December 2023	23 May 2025	46	39	4	3	84.78	
Deportivo La Guaira	(Venezuela)	26 January 2026	1 October 2026	36	13	14	9	36.11	
Career Total				187	98	45	44	52.41	

== Honours ==
=== Manager ===
Johor Darul Ta'zim

- Malaysia Super League: 2022, 2024–25
- Malaysia Cup: 2022, 2024–25
- Malaysia FA Cup: 2022, 2024
