= Unión Comercio =

Peruvian association football club

- Full name: Club Deportivo Unión Comercio
- Nicknames: El Poderoso de San Martín, El Poderoso del Altomayo
- Founded: 15 June 1994; 31 years ago
- Ground: Estadio Carlos Vidaurre García
- Capacity: 8,000
- Chairman: Freddy Chávez Ríos
- Manager: Alejandro Russo
- League: Liga 2
- 2024: Liga 1, 18th of 18 (relegated)
- Website: https://www.unioncomercio.pe/
Home colours	Away colours	Third colours

Club Deportivo Unión Comercio, simply known as Unión Comercio, is a Peruvian professional football club based in the city of Nueva Cajamarca, San Martín, Peru. The club plays in the Liga 2, the second tier of Peruvian football, after being relegated in 2024. Unión Comercio plays their home games at Estadio Carlos Vidaurre García in Tarapoto.

== History ==
Unión Comercio was founded on 15 June 1994 by merchants of the Central Market of Nueva Cajamarca, and participated in local tournaments in Tarapoto until 2010 where they played in the Copa Perú.

In 2003, the club were provincial champion of San Martín and qualified for the Departmental Stage of the Copa Perú, where it was eliminated in the semi-finals by Deportivo Pesquero de Moyobamba in a penalty shootout.

Unión Comercio were champions of the Liga Provincial de Rioja in 2009 and again in 2010. They were also 2010 Liga Departamental champions, where they defeated Atlético Belén and Liga Distrital de Nueva Cajamarca champions and were promoted to the Copa Peru.

In the 2010 Copa Perú, the club qualified to the National Stage when they defeated Cultural Volante, Juventud Santa Rosa and Carlos A. Mannucci in the Region II's group A. Unión Comercio was the 2010 Copa Perú Champion when they defeated Alianza Unicachi in the final. As a result, the team was promoted to the Peruvian First Division for the first time in the club's history.

In its first season in the First Division of Peru, Unión Comercio was placed in sixth place achieving qualification to the Copa Sudamericana for the first time.

In 2014 the campaign improved by placing fourth in the tournament, which was its best participation in the first division, achieving another qualification to the Copa Sudamericana. In 2015, they finished eighth and were eliminated again in the first round against Águilas Doradas (2-0 in the first leg and a 1-1 draw in the second leg). In 2016, they finished 10th, in 2017 in 14th and in 2018 in 10th.

Since 2011, the club played in the Liga 1 until it was relegated to the Liga 2 after placing bottom in the 2024 season.

== Historic badges ==
1994–2010

2011

== Stadium ==
Unión Comercio has multiple stadiums that they are available to play in. They currently play at Estadio Carlos Vidaurre García, located in Tarapoto with a capacity of 7,000. Unión Comercio's originally home stadium was Estadio IPD de Moyobamba which has a capacity of 8,000. They also may play at Estadio IPD de Nueva Cajamarca with a capacity of 12,000.

== Current squad ==
As of 10 March 2025.

Note: Flags indicate national team as defined under FIFA eligibility rules; some limited exceptions apply. Players may hold more than one non-FIFA nationality.

No.	Pos.	Nation	Player
1	GK	ARG	Federico Nicosia
2	DF	PER	Joaquín Delgado
3	DF	COL	Jhonny Mena
4	DF	PER	Carlos Montoya
5	MF	PER	Kelvin Sánchez
6	MF	PER	Dustin Rengifo
7	FW	PER	Cristhian Vargas
8	MF	PER	Neil Marcos (captain)
9	FW	COL	Jesús Arrieta
10	MF	PER	Mario Velarde
11	FW	ARG	Lucas Farías
12	GK	PER	Regis Quiroz
13	DF	PER	Mirlon Coronel
14	DF	PER	Cleyder Vargas
15	MF	PER	David Marines
16	DF	PER	Mauro Aguilar

No.	Pos.	Nation	Player
17	DF	PER	Denilson Vargas
18	DF	PER	Johan Ayala
19	MF	PER	Gabriel Delgado
20	MF	ARG	Gabriel Morales
21	GK	PER	Diego López
22	DF	PER	Juan Muñoz
23	DF	PER	Farihd Ortega
24	DF	PER	Neyver Ordóñez
25	FW	PER	Álvaro Medrano
26	DF	PER	Maelo Reátegui
28	FW	PER	Osama Jiménez
29	FW	COL	Victor Perlaza
30	DF	PER	Jamilton Isuiza
31	GK	PER	Homero Cachique
32	MF	PER	Cristian Becerra
33	FW	PER	Francescoli Arevalo

== Honours ==
=== Senior titles ===
Keys

- Record
- ^{(s)} Shared record

Type	Competition	Titles	Runner-up	Winning years	Runner-up years
National (League)	Liga 2	—	1	—	2022
National (League)	Copa Perú	1	—	2010	—
Half-year / Short tournament (League)	Torneo Apertura (Liga 2)	—	1	—	2022
Half-year / Short tournament (League)	Torneo Clausura (Liga 2)	—	2	—	2021, 2022
Regional (League)	Región VIII	1	—	2010	—
Regional (League)	Liga Departamental de San Martín	1	—	2010	—
Regional (League)	Liga Provincial de Rioja	2	1	2003, 2010	2009
Regional (League)	Liga Distrital de Nueva Cajamarca	1	1	2009	2010

=== Under-20 team ===
Type	Competition	Titles	Runner-up	Winning years	Runner-up years
National (League)	Torneo de Promoción y Reservas	—	1	—	2015
Half-year / Short tournament (League)	Torneo Apertura (Reserva)	—	1	—	2015

== Results ==
=== Performance in CONMEBOL competitions ===
Competition	A	P	W	D	L	GF	GA
Copa Sudamericana	3	4	0	2	2	1	5

A = appearances, P = matches played, W = won, D = drawn, L = lost, GF = goals for, GA = goals against.

Season	Competition	Round		Club	Home	Away
2012	Copa Sudamericana	Q1	(Colombia)	Envigado	0–0	0–2

== Managers ==
- (Peru) Leo Morales (2010)
- (Argentina) Hernán Lisi (2011)
- (Peru) Julio César Uribe (2011-2012)
- (Uruguay) Mario Viera (2012)
- (Argentina) Fernando Nogara (2013)
- (Peru) Johano Bermúdez (interim) (2013)
- (Colombia) Édgar Ospina (2013)
- (Peru) Javier Arce (2013)
- (Peru) Agustín Castillo (2014)
- (Colombia) Walter Aristizábal (2014-2015)
- (Peru) Raymundo Paz (interim) (2015)
- (Colombia) Walter Aristizábal (2015-2016)
- (Peru) Julio César Uribe (2017)
- (Peru) Franco Mendoza (interim) (2017)
- (Colombia) Miguel Augusto Prince (2017)
- (Peru) Gerardo Carrillo (interim) (2017)
- (Colombia) Carlos Silva (2017)
- (Colombia) Hernán Pacheco (2017)
- (Peru) Javier Arce (2017)
- (Colombia) Walter Aristizábal (2018)
- (Peru) Rafael Castillo (2018)
- (Argentina) Marcelo Vivas (2018-2019)
- (Peru) Alfredo Bernal / (Peru) Ytalo Manzo (interim) (2019)
- (Colombia) Diego Barragán (2019)
- (Colombia) Walter Aristizábal (2019)
- (Peru) Leo Morales (2020)
- (Peru) Ytalo Manzo (2020)
- (Colombia) Richard Parra (2021)
- (Peru) Carlos Cortijo (2021)
- (Peru) Jesús Oropesa (2022-2023)
- (Colombia) Jaime de la Pava (2023)
- (Peru) Raymundo Paz (interim) (2023)
- (Venezuela) Daniel Farías (2023)
- (Argentina) Marcelo Vivas (2023)
- (Peru) Raymundo Paz (interim) (2023)
- (Argentina) Néstor Craviotto (2024)
- (Colombia) Milton García (2024)

== See also ==
- List of football clubs in Peru
- Peruvian football league system
