= Ytalo Manzo =

Peruvian football manager (born 1974)

Personal information
- Full name: Ytalo Rodulfo Manzo Santos
- Date of birth: 4 August 1974 (age 52)
- Place of birth: Puno, Peru
- Height: 1.85 m (6 ft 1 in)
- Position: Goalkeeper

Senior career*
Years	Team	Apps	(Gls)
2002–2003	Coronel Bolognesi		
2004	Atlético Universidad	4	(0)
2005	Coronel Bolognesi		
2007	Deportivo Municipal	1	(0)
2008	UTC	0	(0)
2011–2012	Alianza Unicachi	3	(0)

Managerial career
- 2012: Binacional
- 2019: Unión Comercio (interim)
- 2020: Unión Comercio (interim)
- 2021: Sport Boys (interim)
- 2022: Sport Boys
- * Club domestic league appearances and goals

Ytalo Rodulfo Manzo Santos (born 4 August 1974) is a Peruvian football manager and former player who played as a goalkeeper.

After playing mainly for Peruvian Segunda División sides, Manzo started working as a goalkeeping coach, being also an interim manager at Unión Comercio and Sport Boys. For the 2022 season, he was definitely appointed manager of the latter.
