= 2007 CD Universidad San Martín season =

Universidad San Martín de Porres
2007 season
- Chairman: Universidad San Martín de Porres
- Manager: Víctor Rivera
- Primera División Peruana 2007: Full Table: Champion; *Apertura: Champion; *Clausura: 7°

The 2007 season was the 4th season of competitive football by Universidad San Martín de Porres.

== Statistics ==
=== Appearances and goals ===
Number	Position	Name	Torneo Apertura		Torneo Clausura		Total	
Number	Position	Name	Apps	Goals	Apps	Goals	Apps	Goals
	GK	(Peru) Leao Butrón	20 (0)	0	17 (0)	0	37 (0)	0
	GK	(Peru) Marco Flores	2 (1)	0	5 (1)	0	7 (2)	0
	GK	(Peru) Ricardo Farro	0 (0)	0	0 (0)	0	0 (0)	0
	DF	(Peru) Jorge Huamán	22 (0)	0	15 (0)	0	37 (0)	0
	FW	(Peru) Manuel Ugaz	9 (4)	0	5 (4)	0	14 (8)	0
	DF	(Peru) José Chacón	19 (0)	1	18 (0)	0	37 (0)	1
	DF	(Peru) Jorge Reyes	10 (0)	0	5 (2)	0	15 (2)	0
	DF	(Peru) Orlando Contreras	13 (3)	0	20 (0)	1	33 (3)	1
	DF	(Argentina) Aldo Mores	1 (2)	0	1 (1)	0	2 (3)	0
	DF	(Peru) Wenceslao Fernández	17 (0)	0	18 (1)	0	35 (1)	0
	DF	(Peru) Daniel Peláez	2 (0)	0	4 (1)	0	6 (1)	0
	DF	(Peru) Wilmer Carrillo	1 (1)	0	2 (1)	0	3 (2)	0
	MF	(Peru) Carlos Ibarra	4 (0)	1	5 (1)	0	9 (1)	1
	MF	(Peru) John Hinostroza	17 (0)	0	21 (0)	1	38 (0)	1
	MF	(Peru) Edwim Pérez	21 (0)	0	17 (0)	0	38 (0)	0
	MF	(Peru) Fernando Del Solar	16 (1)	1	7 (8)	1	23 (9)	2
	FW	(Peru) Pedro García	14 (4)	8	18 (1)	7	32 (5)	15
	MF	(Peru) Ryan Salazar	5 (11)	2	12 (7)	6	17 (18)	8
	MF	(Argentina) Enzo Gutiérrez	1 (5)	1	3 (4)	1	4 (9)	2
	MF	(Uruguay) Mario Leguizamón	11 (4)	10	12 (2)	3	23 (6)	13
	FW	(Peru) Hernán Rengifo	17 (0)	13	0 (0)	0	17 (0)	13
	FW	(Peru) Mauricio Montes	7 (3)	1	13 (4)	1	20 (7)	2
	FW	(Peru) Antonio Meza Cuadra	4 (4)	1	3 (3)	0	7 (7)	1
	FW	(Peru) Luis Laguna	0 (2)	0	0 (0)	0	0 (2)	0
	MF	(Peru) Ronald Quinteros	4 (6)	0	5 (6)	1	9 (12)	1
	FW	(Argentina) Gastón Cellerino	3 (11)	4	0 (0)	0	3 (11)	4
	MF	(Peru) Josepmir Ballón	0 (3)	0	2 (2)	0	2 (5)	0
		(Peru) Sebastián Arias	0 (1)	0	0 (0)	0	0 (1)	0
		(Peru) Atilio Muente	0 (0)	0	2 (1)	0	2 (1)	0
	FW	(Peru) Roberto Silva	0 (0)	0	9 (7)	3	9 (7)	3
	FW	(Paraguay) Manuel Zandoná	0 (0)	0	3 (4)	0	3 (4)	0
	FW	(Colombia) Eudalio Arriaga	0 (0)	0	3 (2)	0	3 (2)	0

=== Competition Overload ===
Club World Cup	Recopa	Libertadores	Sudamericana	Primera División	Apertura	Clausura
				Champion: First title	Champion: First title	7th

== Primera División Peruana 2007 ==
=== Apertura 2007 ===
Date	Opponent team	Home/Away	Score	Scorers
3 February 2007	Coronel Bolognesi	A	1 – 1	Leguizamón 68'
11 February 2007	Total Clean	H	1 – 0	Cellerino 75'
14 February 2007	Alianza Lima	A	1 – 4	García 87'
18 February 2007	Alianza Atlético	H	3 – 0	Montes 29', Leguizamón 47, Cellerino 75'
25 February 2007	Sport Boys	A	0 – 2	
3 March 2007	Sporting Cristal	H	2 – 2	Rengifo 44', García 89'
11 March 2007	F.B.C. Melgar	A	3 – 0	Del Solar 37', García 62', Gutiérrez 74'
17 March 2007	Deportivo Municipal	H	2 – 1	Meza Cuadra 6', Rengifo 59'
18 April 2007	Cienciano	H	0 – 2	
1 April 2007	Universitario	A	3 – 0	Cellerino 17', 23', Rengifo 75'
23 May 2007	Sport Ancash	H	4 – 0	Leguizamón 33', Rengifo 39', 51', 73'
11 April 2007	Coronel Bolognesi	H	1 – 2	Rengifo 3'
14 April 2007	Total Clean	A	3 – 2	García 11', Rengifo 29', 39'
22 April 2007	Alianza Lima	H	2 – 0	Rengifo 16', García 46'
29 April 2007	Alianza Atlético	A	2 – 2	Leguizamón 19', Rengifo 51'
2 May 2007	Sport Boys	H	4 – 0	Leguizamón 11', 22', 63' Rengifo 25'
5 May 2007	Sporting Cristal	A	3 – 0	García 9', 34', Leguizamón 81'
12 May 2007	F.B.C. Melgar	H	3 – 0	Rengifo 3', García 26', Chacón 50'
19 May 2007	Deportivo Municipal	A	1 – 0	Salazar 90' + 1'
27 May 2007	Cienciano	A	2 – 1	Rengifo 57', Leguizamón 81'
6 June 2007	Universitario	H	2 – 2	Salazar 38', Leguizamón 53'
10 June 2007	Sport Ancash	A	1 – 1	Ibarra 52'

=== Clausura 2007 ===
Date	Opponent team	Home/Away	Score	Scorers
22 July 2007	Sport Ancash	H	2 – 1	Salazar 6', Leguizamón 41'
29 July 2007	Total Clean	A	0 – 2	
5 August 2007	Sporting Cristal	A	1 – 1	Silva 6'
8 August 2007	Cienciano	H	3 – 1	Salazar 19', García 39', 75'
12 August 2007	Alianza Lima	A	5 – 0	García 21', 75', Salazar 53', 62', Quinteros 58'
26 August 2007	F.B.C. Melgar	A	1 – 2	Salazar 28'
2 September 2007	Deportivo Municipal	H	0 – 1	
16 September 2007	Alianza Atlético	A	1 – 2	Contreras 39'
19 September 2007	Coronel Bolognesi	H	0 – 2	
23 September 2007	Sport Boys	H	1 – 1	Leguizamón 20'
26 September 2007	Universitario	A	0 – 0	
29 September 2007	Sport Ancash	A	0 – 1	
7 October 2007	Total Clean	H	3 – 0	Hinostroza 52', Montes 68', García 82'
23 October 2007	Sporting Cristal	A	1 – 1	Salazar 80'
27 October 2007	Cienciano	A	0 – 4	
31 October 2007	Alianza Lima	H	0 – 0	
4 November 2007	Coronel Bolognesi	A	1 – 0	Del Solar 17'
10 November 2007	F.B.C. Melgar	H	1 – 0	Leguizamón 71'
24 November 2007	Deportivo Municipal	A	2 – 2	García 57', Silva 84'
1 December 2007	Alianza Atlético	H	3 – 0	García 10', Silva 70', Gutiérrez 85'
8 December 2007	Sport Boys	A	0 – 1	
16 December 2007	Universitario	H	0 – 2	

== Mid-season friendlies ==
Date	Opponent team	Home/Away	Score	Scorers
12 July 2007	(Chile) Universidad Católica	H	1 – 4	Meza-Cuadra 55'
14 July 2007	(Costa Rica) Alajuelense	H	1 – 1	Salazar 18'

== Pre-season friendlies ==
Date	Opponent team	Home/Away	Score	Scorers
26 January 2007	(Peru) Cienciano	N	0 – 0 (4 – 5p)	
28 January 2007	(Peru) Sport Boys	N	1 – 0	Cellerino 87'
