= 2006 CD Universidad San Martín season =

Universidad San Martín de Porres
2006 season
- Chairman: Universidad San Martín de Porres
- Manager: (Peru) Rafael Castillo (31 Jul) (Argentina) (Spain) Juan Antonio Pizzi (26 Nov) (Peru) Víctor Rivera
- Primera División Peruana 2006: Full Table: 6° *Apertura: 5° *Clausura: 5°
- Copa Sudamericana: Preliminary Chile/Peru

The 2007 season was the 3rd season of competitive football by Universidad San Martín de Porres.

== Statistics ==
=== Appearances and goals ===
Last updated in January 2006.

Number	Position	Name	Copa Sudamericana		Torneo Apertura		Torneo Clausura		Total	
Number	Position	Name	Apps	Goals	Apps	Goals	Apps	Goals	Apps	Goals
1	GK	(Peru) Leao Butrón	2 (0)	-3	-	-	-	-	-	-
2	DF	(Peru) Jorge Huamán	2 (0)	0	-	-	-	-	-	-
3	DF	(Peru) José Chacón	0 (1)	0	-	-	-	-	-	-
4	DF	(Peru) Jorge Reyes	1 (0)	0	-	-	-	-	-	-
5	DF	(Colombia) Roller Cambindo	1 (0)	0	-	-	-	-	-	-
6	MF	(Peru) John Hinostroza	2 (0)	0	-	-	-	-	-	-
7	DF	(Peru) Wenceslao Fernández	2 (0)	0	-	-	-	-	-	-
8	FW	(Peru) Mauricio Montes	1 (1)	0	-	-	-	-	-	-
9	FW	(Uruguay) Sergio Leal	0 (0)	0	-	-	-	-	-	-
10	MF	(Colombia) Luis Omar Valencia	2 (0)	0	-	-	-	-	-	-
11	FW	(Peru) Fernando García	0 (0)	0	-	-	-	-	-	-
12	GK	(Peru) Marcos Flores	0 (0)	0	-	-	-	-	-	-
13	DF	(Peru) Sergio Ubillus	0 (0)	0	-	-	-	-	-	-
14	MF	(Peru) Ryan Salazar	0 (0)	0	-	-	-	-	-	-
15	FW	(Uruguay) Mario Leguizamón	1 (1)	0	-	-	-	-	-	-
16	FW	(Peru) Pedro García	0 (0)	0	-	-	-	-	-	-
17	MF	(Peru) Manuel Ugaz	0 (2)	0	-	-	-	-	-	-
18	MF	(Peru) Fernando Del Solar	2 (0)	2	-	-	-	-	-	-
19	MF	(Peru) Edwin Pérez	0 (0)	0	-	-	-	-	-	-
20	MF	(Peru) Carlos Ibarra	0 (0)	0	-	-	-	-	-	-
21	GK	(Peru) Ricardo Farro	0 (0)	0	-	-	-	-	-	-
22	FW	(Colombia) Oscar Villarreal	2 (0)	1	-	-	-	-	-	-
23	DF	(Peru) John Galliquio	2 (0)	0	-	-	-	-	-	-
24	FW	(Peru) Hernán Rengifo	0 (1)	0	-	-	-	-	-	-
25	MF	(Peru) Wilmer Carrillo	2 (0)	0	-	-	-	-	-	-

=== Competition Overload ===
Club World Cup	Recopa	Libertadores	Sudamericana	Primera División	Apertura	Clausura
			Preliminary Chile-Peru	6th	5th	5th

== Copa Sudamericana 2006 ==
=== Preliminary Chile/Peru ===
Date	Opponent team	Home/Away	Score	Scorers
24 August 2006	(Peru) Coronel Bolognesi	A	0 – 1	
31 August 2006	(Peru) Coronel Bolognesi	H	3 – 2	Del Solar 13', 40', Villareal 69'
