= 2005 CD Universidad San Martín season =

Universidad San Martín de Porres
2005 season
- Chairman: Universidad San Martín de Porres
- Manager: (Argentina) Oscar Malbernat (Peru) Mario Flores (Peru) Víctor Rivera (Peru) Rafael Castillo
- Primera División Peruana 2005: Full Table: 4° *Apertura: 7° *Clausura: 2°

The 2005 season was the 2nd season of competitive football by Universidad San Martín de Porres.

== Statistics ==
=== Appearances and goals ===
Number	Position	Name	Torneo Apertura		Torneo Clausura		Total	
Number	Position	Name	Apps	Goals	Apps	Goals	Apps	Goals

=== Competition Overload ===
Club World Cup	Recopa	Libertadores	Sudamericana	Primera División	Apertura	Clausura
				4th	7th	2nd

== Primera División Peruana 2005 ==
=== Apertura 2005 ===
Date	Opponent team	Home/Away	Score	Scorers
5 March 2005	Sporting Cristal	H	1–2	Ismodes
13 March 2005	Alianza Atlético	A	2–0	Ismodes, F. Garcia
16 March 2005	Universitario	H	1–3	Chacón
20 March 2005	Cienciano	A	0–1	
2 April 2005	Unión Huaral	H	0–1	
9 April 2005	Atlético Universidad	A	0–1	
15 April 2005	Coronel Bolognesi	H	1–1	Benites
20 April 2005	U. César Vallejo	A	0–0	
30 April 2005	Alianza Lima	H	1–1	P. Garcia
8 May 2005	Sport Ancash	A	1–2	P. Garcia
11 May 2005	Sport Boys	A	1–1	Luguercio
15 May 2005	F.B.C. Melgar	H	2–1	Huamán, Luguercio
11 June 2005	Sporting Cristal	A	1–1	Rengifo
15 June 2005	Alianza Atlético	H	0–0	
18 June 2005	Universitario	A	1–2	P. Garcia
25 June 2005	Cienciano	H	2–0	Rengifo, Cambindo
29 June 2005	Unión Huaral	A	2–1	Morales, Rengifo
3 July 2005	Atlético Universidad	H	5–0	Rengifo, P. Garcia, Ismodes, Morales (x2)
9 July 2005	Coronel Bolognesi	H	0–2	
13 July 2005	U. César Vallejo	H	2–0	Rengifo, P. Garcia
20 July 2005	Alianza Lima	A	1–1	Rengifo
24 July 2005	Sport Ancash	H	1–0	Luguercio
27 July 2005	F.B.C. Melgar	A	0–3	
31 July 2005	Sport Boys	H	3–2	Rengifo, Carrillo, P. Garcia

=== Clausura 2005 ===
Date	Opponent team	Home/Away	Score	Scorers
6 August 2005	Cienciano	H	2–0	Chacón, Rengifo
10 August 2005	Unión Huaral	A	2–0	Rengifo, Ismodes
14 August 2005	F.B.C. Melgar	H	7–1	Rengifo (x3), Chacón, Ugaz, Alcázar, P. Garcia
20 August 2005	Alianza Lima	A	0–0	
27 August 2005	Coronel Bolognesi	H	0–2	
30 August 2005	U. César Vallejo	A	1–2	own goal
17 September 2005	Sport Ancash	H	4–0	Moisela, Huamán, Luguercio, P. Garcia
24 September 2005	Sport Boys	A	2–0	own goal, Luguercio
28 September 2005	Atlético Universidad	H	2–1	Moisela, P. Garcia
1 October 2005	Universitario	A	1–1	Morales
16 October 2005	Alianza Atlético	H	1–0	Rengifo
22 October 2005	Sporting Cristal	A	2–2	P. Garcia (x2)
26 October 2005	Cienciano	A	2–2	Ibarra, Del Solar
30 October 2005	Unión Huaral	H	1–1	Del Solar
2 November 2005	F.B.C. Melgar	A	2–0	Morales, Carrillo
5 November 2005	Alianza Lima	H	0–3	
12 November 2005	Coronel Bolognesi	A	2–1	P. Garcia (x2)
16 November 2005	U. César Vallejo	H	0–0	
27 November 2005	Sport Ancash	A	1–0	P. Garcia
4 December 2005	Sport Boys	H	1–0	Rengifo
7 December 2005	Atlético Universidad	A	1–3	Rengifo
11 December 2005	Universitario	H	1–0	P. Garcia
14 December 2005	Alianza Atlético	A	4–1	Morales, Rengifo, Ismodes, Ugaz
17 December 2005	Sporting Cristal	H	1–0	Ibarra

== Pre-season friendlies ==
Date	Opponent team	Home/Away	Score	Scorers
29 January 2005	(Peru) Sport Boys	N	0–1	
10 February 2005	(Colombia) Once Caldas	A	1–2	
