= Huapaya =

Huapaya is a surname, and may refer to:

Huapaya derives from wapa which means coffee colored alpaca in Quechua and ya from the Spanish expression ¡Ya està! (there it is).

- Alfonso Huapaya Cabrera - Peruvian football player
- José Moisela Huapaya - Peruvian football player
- Marcial Francisco Buitrón Huapaya - Mayor of Punta Negra from 1990 to 2002
