= 2017 Pan American Surf Games =

Pan American Surf Games Peru 2017
- Host city: Punta Negra, Lima
- Country: Peru
- Organisers: Pan American Surf Association; Federación Deportiva Nacional de Tabla
- Edition: 13th
- Nations: 15
- Athletes: 220
- Sport: Surfing
- Events: 8 (4 men and 4 women)
- Dates: 5–9 December
- Main venue: Punta Rocas Beach
- Website: Peru 2018

The 2017 Pan American Surf Games, also referred to as PASA Games 2017 and officially named 2017 Pan American Claro Games for sponsorship reasons, was the thirteenth edition of the Pan American Surf Games the main competition organized by the Pan American Surf Association. It was held at Punta Rocas Beach in Punta Negra District, Lima, Peru from 4 to 9 December 2018.

The competition was originally scheduled to take place at Punta Roquitas Beach, located in Miraflores District, which had hosted the previous edition of the games. Eventually, it was moved to Punta Negra, 50 mins south of Miraflores.

220 athletes from 15 national teams competed in 8 surfing events; comprising Open (Shortboard), Longboard, SUP surf and SUP race each for men and women. It was the first time that the competing events had full gender equality, with the quotas for male and female competitors being the same in each one.

Defending champions Peru won the competition for the fourth time with a total of 13,901 points and 3 out of the 8 gold medals at stake. Brazil finished second with 12,223 points and 3 gold medal. Argentina (10,613 points and 1 gold medal) and Canada (9,999 points and 1 gold medal) were third and fourth respectively.

== Schedule ==
The games were held over a 6-day period, from 4 to 9 December. The opening ceremony took place on 4 December, with the competitions starting on 5 December.

QR1	Qualifying round 1	QR2	Qualifying round 2	QR3	Qualifying round 3	QR4	Qualifying round 4	SF	Semi-finals	F	Finals

Event↓/Date →	Tue 5	Wed 6	Thu 7	Fri 8		Sat 9	
Men's Open	QR1 (16)	QR2 (8)	QR3 (4)	QR4 (2)	SF (2)	F (2)	
Men's Longboard			QR1 (6)	QR2 (3)	QR3 (2)	SF (2)	F (2)
Men's SUP surf		QR1 (6)		QR2 (3)	QR3 (2)	SF (2)	F (2)
Men's SUP race			F (1)				
Women's Open	QR1 (12)	QR2 (6)	QR3 (3)	QR4 (2)	SF (2)	F (2)	
Women's Longboard			QR1 (6)	QR2 (3)	QR3 (2)	SF (2)	F (2)
Women's SUP surf		QR1 (6)		QR2 (3)	QR3 (2)	SF (2)	F (2)
Women's SUP race			F (1)				
Heats (Total 123)	28	26	21	28		20	

== Participating nations ==
15 out of the 26 national associations affiliated to Pan American Surf Association entered the competition. Each nation was able to enter a maximum of 20 surfers (10 men and 10 women), with up to 4 surfers per gender in the Open events (shortboard) and up to 2 surfers per gender in each Longboard, SUP surf and SUP race events.

- Argentina
- Barbados
- Brazil
- Canada
- Chile
- Colombia
- Costa Rica
- Cuba
- Dominican Republic
- Ecuador
- Mexico
- Peru
- Puerto Rico
- Uruguay
- Venezuela

== Medal table ==
* Host nation (Peru)

Rank	Nation	Gold	Silver	Bronze	Total
1	Peru*	3	3	3	9
2	Brazil	3	2	3	8
3	Canada	1	0	1	2
4	Argentina	1	0	0	1
5	Barbados	0	1	0	1
5	Chile	0	1	0	1
5	Puerto Rico	0	1	0	1
8	Uruguay	0	0	1	1
Totals (8 entries)		8	8	8	24

== Results ==
=== Men's events ===
Event	Gold		Silver		Bronze	
Open	Alonso Correa; Peru	18.26 pts	Maximiliano Cross; Chile	12.26 pts	Sebastián Correa; Peru	15.27 pts
Longboard	Piccolo Clemente; Peru	15.93 pts	Carlos Bahia; Brazil	15.07 pts	Julián Schweizer; Uruguay	13.70 pts
SUP surf	Caio Vaz; Brazil	18.07 pts	Sebastián Gómez; Peru	14.14 pts	Alex Salazar; Brazil	18.00 pts
SUP race	Guilherme dos Reis; Brazil	44:07:65	Vinnicius Martins; Brazil	44:23:21	Itzel Delgado; Peru	45:54:97

=== Women's events ===
Event	Gold		Silver		Bronze	
Open	Ornella Pellizzari; Argentina	13.83 pts	Chelsea Tuach; Barbados	11.75 pts	Mathea Olin; Canada	12.33 pts
Longboard	Mathea Olin; Canada	18.33 pts	Mafer Reyes; Peru	13.46 pts	Carolina Thun; Peru	11.33 pts
SUP surf	Vania Torres; Peru	15.00 pts	Brissa Málaga; Peru	13.90 pts	Aline Adisaka; Brazil	10.17 pts
SUP race	Lena Guimarães; Brazil	37:53:12	Maricarmen Rivera; Puerto Rico	38:59:75	Aline Adisaka; Brazil	39:09:75

=== Final ranking per teams ===
The final ranking per teams was drawn up by adding each surfer's individual points earning in the events in which they competed. Surfers obtained points according to the final position they occupied in each event. In Open, Longboard and SUP surf events, the surfers eliminated before the final occupied a certain position, as follows:

- In Open events
  - Eliminated in qualifying round 1: 3rd place in each heat, 33rd place (men) and 25th place (women); 4th place in each heat, 49th place (men) and 37th place (women).
  - Eliminated in qualifying round 2: 3rd place in each heat, 17th place (men) and 13th place (women); 4th place in each heat, 25th place (men) and 19th place (women).
  - Eliminated in qualifying round 3: 3rd place in each heat, 9th place (men) and 7th place (women); 4th place in each heat, 13th place (men) and 10th place (women).
  - Eliminated in qualifying round 4: 3rd place in each heat, 5th place (men and women); 4th place in each heat, 7th place (men).
- In Longboard and SUP surf events
  - Eliminated in qualifying round 1: 13th place (3rd place of each heat) and 19th place (4th place of each heat).
  - Eliminated in qualifying round 2: 7th place (3rd place of each heat) and 10th place (4th place of each heat).
  - Eliminated in qualifying round 3: 5th place (3rd place of each heat).

Non-initiators and non-finishers surfers received zero points. Points awarded according to the position were as follows:

1st place, gold medalist(s)	2nd place, silver medalist(s)	3rd place, bronze medalist(s)	4	5	6	7	8	9	10	11	12	13	14	15	16	17	18	19	20	21	25	33	37	49
1000	860	730	670	610	583	555	528	500	488	475	462	450	438	425	413	400	395	385	380	375	360	320	300	240

The first place of the final ranking per teams was declared as the champion team of the 2017 Pan American Surf Games.

Rank	Team	MO1	MO2	MO3	MO4	WO1	WO2	WO3	WO4	ML1	ML2	WL1	WL2	MSS1	MSS2	WSS1	WSS2	MSR1	MSR2	WSR1	WSR2	Total
1st place, gold medalist(s)	Peru	1000	730	610	500	610	555	555	390	1000	610	860	730	860	670	1000	860	730	438	610	583	13,901
2nd place, silver medalist(s)	Brazil	500	500	360	320	450	360	360	300	860	555	488	450	1000	730	730	670	1000	860	1000	730	12,223
3rd place, bronze medalist(s)	Argentina	450	400	400	360	1000	670	488	300	670	610	610	488	488	450	555	488	528	488	670	500	10,613
4	Canada	450	400	320	320	730	488	360	360	390	390	1000	450	610	610	610	488	610	475	488	450	9,999
5	Chile	860	610	555	450	610	555	360	360	488	450	450	450	390	390	450	450	425	395	462	438	9,598
6	Mexico	670	500	400	400	488	450	450	390	555	450	488	390	555	390	488	450	450	413	555	0	8,932
7	Venezuela	400	360	320	320	450	360	300	300	555	390	555	390	555	450	610	450	583	400	528	413	8,689
8	Puerto Rico	360	360	320	320	390	390	390	360	450	390	555	450	555	450	555	—	555	462	860	475	8,647
9	Ecuador	555	450	400	400	450	450	390	360	488	450	670	610	450	390	555	390	670	500	0	—	8,628
10	Dominican Republic	320	320	320	240	300	300	300	—	488	390	450	390	450	390	—	—	380	375	0	—	5,413
11	Colombia	320	320	320	320	360	0	—	—	450	—	555	—	488	390	450	—	385	0	425	—	4,783
12	Uruguay	360	360	360	320	360	—	—	—	730	450	—	—	488	450	450	—	0	0	—	—	4,328
13	Barbados	—	—	—	—	860	—	—	—	—	—	—	—	—	—	—	—	—	—	—	—	860
14	Costa Rica	320	—	—	—	—	—	—	—	—	—	—	—	—	—	—	—	—	—	—	—	320
15	Cuba	240	0	—	—	—	—	—	—	—	—	—	—	—	—	—	—	—	—	—	—	240

Note: "—" Denotes that there were no competitors for that position
