= 2018 Pan American Surf Games =

Pan American Surf Games Peru 2018
- Host city: Punta Negra, Lima
- Country: Peru
- Organisers: Pan American Surf Association; Federación Deportiva Nacional de Tabla
- Edition: 14th
- Nations: 20
- Athletes: 270
- Sport: Surfing
- Events: 8 (4 men and 4 women)
- Dates: 2–8 December
- Opened by: José Delgado (Mayor of Punta Negra)
- Main venue: Punta Rocas Beach
- Website: Peru 2018

The 2018 Pan American Surf Games, also referred to as PASA Games 2018 and officially named 2018 Pan American Claro Games for sponsorship reasons, was the fourteenth edition of the Pan American Surf Games the main competition organized by the Pan American Surf Association. It was held at Punta Rocas Beach in Punta Negra District, Lima, Peru from 2 to 8 December 2018.

270 athletes from 20 national teams competes in 8 surfing events; comprising Open (shortboard), Longboard, SUP surf and SUP race each for men and women.

Defending champions Peru won the competition for the fifth time with a total of 12,502 points and 2 out of the 8 gold medals at stake. Brazil finished second with 11,953 points and 1 gold medal. Argentina (9,986 points) and Costa Rica (9,623 points and 1 gold medal) were third and fourth respectively.

== Schedule ==
The games were held over a 7-day period, from 2 to 8 December. The opening ceremony took place on 2 December, with the competitions starting on 3 December.

QR1	Qualifying round 1	QR2	Qualifying round 2	QR3	Qualifying round 3	QR4	Qualifying round 4	SF	Semi-finals	F	Final

Event↓/Date →	Mon 3	Tue 4		Wed 5	Thu 6		Fri 7		Sat 8				
Men's Open					QR1 (16)		QR1 (2)	QR2 (7)	QR2 (2)	QR3 (6)	QR4 (3)	SF (2)	F (1)
Men's Longboard				QR1 (8)	QR2 (4)		SF (2)		F (1)				
Men's SUP surf				QR1 (8)			QR2 (4)		SF (2)		F (1)		
Men's SUP race							SF (2)		F (1)				
Women's Open	QR1 (12)	QR2 (6)	QR3 (3)				SF (2)		F (1)				
Women's Longboard				QR1 (6)	QR2 (3)		SF (2)		F (1)				
Women's SUP surf				QR1 (5)	QR1 (1)	QR2 (3)			SF (2)		F (1)		
Women's SUP race							SF (2)		F (1)				
Heats (Total 123)	12	9		27	27		23		25				

== Participating nations ==
20 out of the 26 national associations affiliated to Pan American Surf Association entered the competition. Each nation was able to enter a maximum of 20 surfers (10 men and 10 women), with up to 4 surfers per gender in the Open event and up to 2 surfers per gender in each Longboard, SUP surf and SUP race events.

- Argentina (18)
- Barbados (4)
- Brazil
- Canada
- Chile
- Colombia
- Costa Rica
- Dominican Republic (6)
- Ecuador
- El Salvador
- Guatemala
- Jamaica
- Mexico
- Panama
- Peru
- Puerto Rico
- Uruguay
- United States
- United States Virgin Islands
- Venezuela

== Medal table ==
* Host nation (Peru)

Rank	Nation	Gold	Silver	Bronze	Total
1	Peru*	2	1	3	6
2	Colombia	2	0	1	3
3	Brazil	1	3	2	6
4	Costa Rica	1	1	1	3
5	United States	1	0	0	1
5	Venezuela	1	0	0	1
7	Argentina	0	1	0	1
7	Ecuador	0	1	0	1
7	Puerto Rico	0	1	0	1
10	Canada	0	0	1	1
Totals (10 entries)		8	8	8	24

== Results ==
=== Men's events ===
Event	Gold		Silver		Bronze		Copper	
Open	Francisco Bellorin; Venezuela	14.17 pts	Anthony Fillingim; Costa Rica	12.20 pts	Alonso Correa; Peru	10.70 pts	Jhonathan Corzo; Mexico	10.07 pts
Longboard	Piccolo Clemente; Peru	16.50 pts	Surfiel Gil; Argentina	14.27 pts	Lucas Garrido Lecca; Peru	13.30 pts	Wenderson De Almeida; Brazil	12.73 pts
SUP surf	Giorgio Gómez; Colombia	13.46 pts	Luis Diniz; Brazil	12.20 pts	Caio Vaz; Brazil	11.93 pts	Finn Spencer; Canada	10.67 pts
SUP race	Itzel Delgado; Peru	24:58:60	Vinnicius Martins; Brazil	25:02:20	Giorgio Gómez; Colombia	25:16:85	Zane Schweitzer; United States	25:29:89

=== Women's events ===
Event	Gold		Silver		Bronze		Copper	
Open	Brisa Henessys; Costa Rica	14.50 pts	Dominic Barona; Ecuador	14.17 pts	Daniella Rosas; Peru	10.40 pts	Chelsea Tuach; Barbados	8.47 pts
Longboard	Chloe Gama; Brazil	15.34 pts	Atalanta Batista; Brazil	12.47 pts	Brisa Henessys; Costa Rica	6.97 pts	Mafer Reyes; Peru	6.50 pts
SUP surf	Izzi Gómez; Colombia	11.90 pts	Vania Torres; Peru	8.77 pts	Nicole Pacelli; Brazil	8.53 pts	Brissa Malaga; Peru	5.67 pts
SUP race	April Zilg; United States	27:52:71	Maricarmen Rivera; Puerto Rico	28:08:84	Lina Augaitis; Canada	28:11:16	Lena Ribeiro; Brazil	28:41:93

=== Final ranking per teams ===
The final ranking per teams was drawn up by adding each surfer's individual points earning in the events in which they competed. Surfers obtained points according to the final position they occupied in each event. In Open, Longboard and SUP surf events, the surfers eliminated before the final occupied a certain position, as follows:

- Eliminated in round 1 (Open events): 33th place (3rd place of each heat) and 49th place (4th place of each heat)
- Eliminated in round 1 (Longboard and SUP surf) and round 2 (Open): 17th place (3rd place of each heat) and 25th place (4th place of each heat)
- Eliminated in quarter-finals: 9th place (3rd place of each heat) and 13th place (4th place of each heat)
- Eliminated in semi-finals: 5th place (3rd place of each heat) and 7th place (4th place of each heat)

Non-initiators and non-finishers surfers received zero points. Points awarded according to the position were as follows:

1st place, gold medalist(s)	2nd place, silver medalist(s)	3rd place, bronze medalist(s)	4	5	6	7	8	9	10	11	12	13	14	15	16	17	18	19	20	21	25	33	48
1000	860	730	670	610	583	555	528	500	488	475	462	450	438	425	413	400	395	390	385	380	360	320	240

The first place of the final ranking per teams was declared as the champion team of the 2018 Pan American Surf Games.

Rank	Team	MO1	MO2	MO3	MO4	WO1	WO2	WO3	WO4	ML1	ML2	WL1	WL2	MSS1	MSS2	WSS1	WSS2	MSR1	MSR2	WSR1	WSR2	Total
1st place, gold medalist(s)	Peru	730	555	488	488	730	555	488	390	1000	730	670	610	610	500	860	670	1000	528	500	400	12,502
2nd place, silver medalist(s)	Brazil	610	450	345	345	450	360	300	300	670	610	1000	860	860	730	730	610	860	610	670	583	11,953
3rd place, bronze medalist(s)	Argentina	555	450	450	300	555	450	360	360	860	500	610	450	500	400	555	488	583	488	610	462	9,986
4	Costa Rica	860	488	555	—	1000	450	390	390	555	500	730	390	450	360	390	390	390	380	555	400	9,623
5	United States	390	300	210	210	390	390	360	360	450	400	555	390	610	555	555	390	670	413	1000	370	8,968
6	Canada	390	390	300	210	488	450	390	360	400	360	555	450	670	555	450	450	475	380	730	475	8,928
7	Ecuador	610	450	345	345	860	300	300	300	500	400	488	450	400	400	488	390	500	390	380	370	8,666
8	Mexico	670	345	345	210	488	360	360	300	450	400	555	488	450	400	450	390	555	462	528	425	8,631
9	Venezuela	1000	300	210	210	610	300	300	300	400	400	450	450	500	400	450	390	425	370	438	380	8,283
10	Chile	450	390	300	300	610	360	300	300	500	360	488	450	400	400	450	450	400	400	488	390	8,186
11	Puerto Rico	450	345	300	210	555	450	360	—	555	400	—	—	500	450	555	488	450	438	860	450	7,816
12	Colombia	345	300	300	210	450	300	—	—	360	360	390	—	1000	360	1000	—	730	360	413	390	7,268
13	Dominican Republic	300	300	300	300	—	—	—	—	450	360	—	—	450	400	—	—	370	350	—	—	3,580
14	Uruguay	360	240	240	240	—	—	—	—	610	400	—	—	360	—	—	—	—	—	—	—	2,840
15	El Salvador	390	300	—	—	—	—	—	—	450	—	—	—	0	—	610	—	—	—	—	—	1,750
16	Barbados	345	300	—	—	670	360	—	—	—	—	—	—	—	—	—	—	—	—	—	—	1,675
17	Guatemala	300	210	—	—	—	—	—	—	—	—	—	—	—	—	—	—	360	350	—	—	1,220
18	Jamaica	300	210	210	210	—	—	—	—	—	—	—	—	—	—	—	—	—	—	—	—	930
19	Panama	390	—	—	—	360	—	—	—	—	—	—	—	—	—	—	—	—	—	—	—	750
20	United States Virgin Islands	210	210	—	—	—	—	—	—	—	—	—	—	—	—	—	—	—	—	—	—	420

Note: "—" Denotes that there were no competitors for that position
