= Mathea Olin =

Canadian surfer

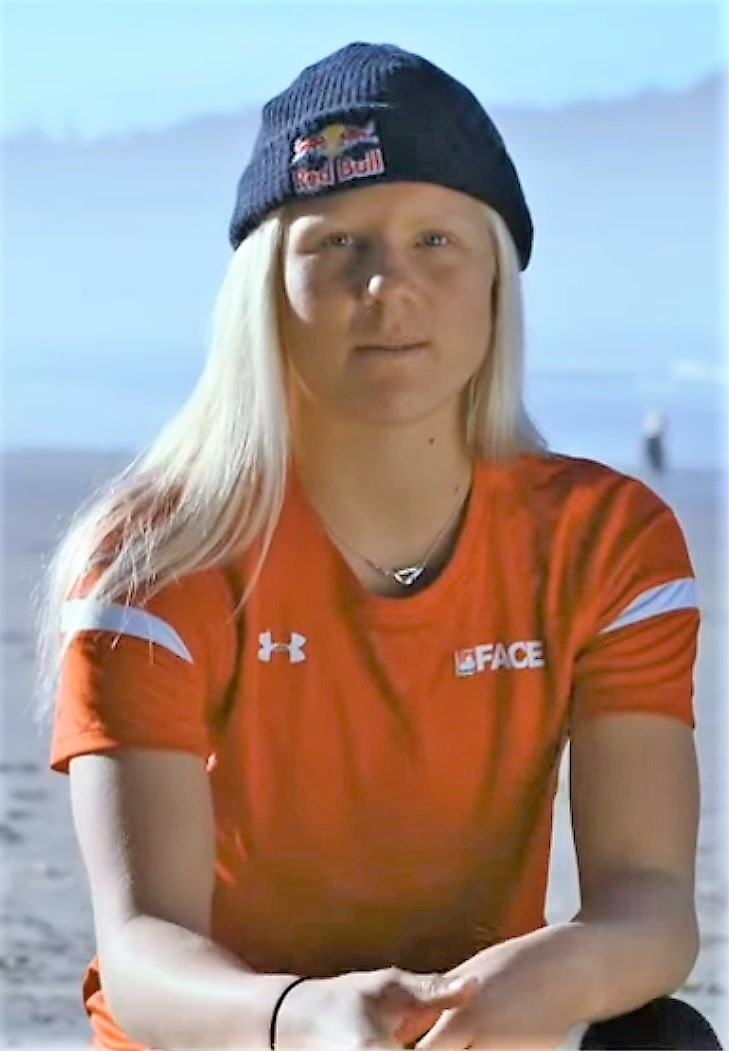
- Olin appearing on CBC Sports in 2019

Personal information
- Full name: Mathea Dempfle-Olin
- Born: February 2, 2003 (age 23) Canmore, Alberta, Canada
- Home town: Tofino, British Columbia, Canada

Surfing career
- Country: Canada
- Sport: Surfing
- Event: Longboard
Medal record
Women's surfing
Representing Canada
Pan American Games
Bronze medal – third place	2019 Lima	Longboard

Mathea Dempfle-Olin (born February 2, 2003) is a Canadian surfer. As a 14 year old, she won Canada's first surfing medals in international competition with a gold and bronze at the 2017 Pan American Surf Games. Olin also won a bronze at the 2019 Pan American Games in Lima, Peru.

== Biography ==
Mathea Dempfle-Olin was born in Canmore, Alberta, on February 2, 2003. At the age of six she moved to Tofino, British Columbia, where she started surfing; she began surfing competitively at the age of ten. Olin was also a gymnast, training in Port Alberni. She dreamed of competing in gymnastics at the Olympics until the 128th IOC Session, when surfing was added to the 2020 Summer Olympics in Tokyo, Japan.

In 2017, Olin was a recipient of CA$10,000 from Petro-Canada's Fuelling Athlete and Coaching Excellence (FACE) program. She was the first surfer to be awarded by the program.

== Career ==
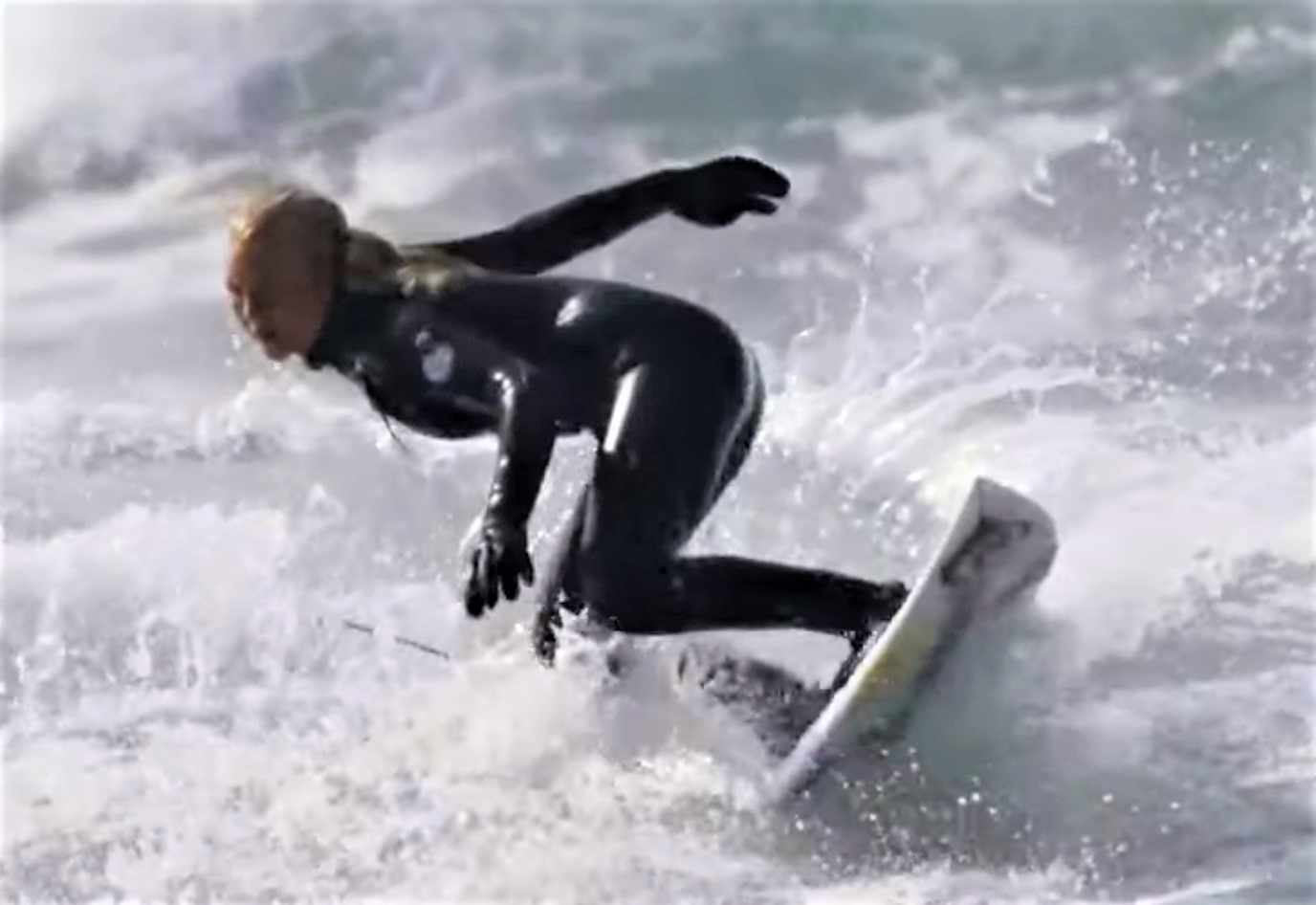
Olin surfing on CBC Sports in 2019

=== 2017 Pan American Surf Games ===
From December 5 to 9 at the 2017 Pan American Surf Games, Olin competed in the women's shortboard event, where she won bronze. She also competed in women's longboard. She beat out Peruvian silver medallist Maria Fernanda Reyes and bronze medallist Carolina Thun to win gold.

Olin's performance qualified her for the 2019 Pan American Games in Lima, Peru. Her medals at the competition are also Canada's first medals in international competition for surfing.

=== Canadian Surfing Championships ===
At the May 2019 Rip Curl Nationals at Wickaninnish Beach in the Pacific Rim National Park Reserve, Olin competed in the girl's U18 event, where she scored 8.80 points, securing second place. She was held off by her sister, Sanoa, who took first place with 10.74. Olin also participated in the open women's event. She placed fourth with a score of 10.03, 0.9 points behind her sister in third place.

=== 2019 Pan American Games ===
On June 7, 2019, Surfing Canada and the Canadian Olympic Committee announced Olin to be a part of Canada's first Pan American surfing team, which was set to compete at the 2019 Pan American Games.

From July 29 to August 4, Olin competed in the women's longboard event at Punta Rocas beach in the Punta Negra District of Peru. In the first round on July 29, she competed in a heat against Argentinian Maria Gil Boggan and Mexican Risa Machuca. Olin placed second and advanced to the next round with a score of 8.73, 0.33 behind Boggan. In round two on July 31, she faced Brazilian Chloe Calmon and Ecuadorian Michell Soriano. Olin advanced to the third round and placed second with a score of 8.63, 6.03 behind the heat winner, Calmon. In the third round on August 1, she competed against American Tiare Thompson. Olin won with a score of 12.03, beating Thompson by 1.67 points. In the fourth round on August 3, she competed against Calmon for a spot in the finals against Peruvian Maria Fernanda Reyes. Olin started strong in her first wave, scoring 7.83 points against Calmon's 5.83, but fell behind in her second wave, only scoring 2.47 points against her opponent's 4.77 points. Olin scored 10.30 points in total, losing by only 0.3 points to Calmon's 10.60 — she moved on to the bronze medal match against the winner of the repechage rounds, Maria Fernanda Reyes, where the winner would face Chloe Calmon for the gold medal. On August 4, she scored 8.70, which was not enough to beat Reyes' 13.50, giving Olin the bronze medal.

As of 2019, Olin's bronze medal is Canada's first and only Pan American medal in surfing.
