= Gerardo Morales =

Gerardo Morales may refer to:

- Gerardo Morales (politician) (born 1959), Argentine politician
- Gerardo Morales (footballer) (born 1975), Uruguayan football midfielder
