= Surfing at the 2023 Pan American Games – Qualification =

The following is the qualification system and qualified athletes for the Surfing at the 2023 Pan American Games competitions.

== Qualification ==
A total of 88 surfers will qualify across various qualification tournaments. The host nation Chile, will be automatically be allocated ten quota spots across the eight events. In the shortboard category, a country can enter two athletes, with a maximum one in all other categories. A country can enter a maximum ten surfers (five per gender). An athlete can only qualify one quota for their country.

== Qualification timeline ==
| Events | Date | Venue |
|---|---|---|
| 2022 ISA World SUP Championships | October 28 – November 6, 2022 | (Puerto Rico) San Juan |
| 2022 ALAS Pro Tour | January – December, 2022 | Various |
| 2023 Pan American Surfing Games | April 21–30, 2023 | (Panama) Santa Catalina |
| 2023 ISA World Longboard Championships | May 7–13, 2023 | (El Salvador) La Bocana and El Sunzal |
| 2023 ISA World Surfing Games | May 30 – June 7, 2023 | (El Salvador) La Bocana and El Sunzal |

== Qualification summary ==
The following is the qualification summary.

| Nation | Men | | | | Women | | | | Total |
| Nation | Shortboard | SUP surf | SUP race | Longboard | Shortboard | SUP surf | SUP race | Longboard | Surfers |
|---|---|---|---|---|---|---|---|---|---|
| Argentina | 2 | 1 | 1 | 1 | 2 | 1 | 1 | | 9 |
| Barbados | | | | | 1 | | | | 1 |
| Brazil | 2 | 1 | 1 | 1 | 2 | 1 | 1 | 1 | 10 |
| Canada | 1 | 1 | 1 | | 1 | 1 | 1 | 1 | 7 |
| Chile | 2 | 1 | 1 | 1 | 2 | 1 | 1 | 1 | 10 |
| Colombia | | | | | 1 | 1 | | | 2 |
| Costa Rica | 1 | 1 | 1 | 1 | 2 | | 1 | 1 | 8 |
| Ecuador | | | | | 1 | 1 | | | 2 |
| El Salvador | | | | 1 | | 1 | | 1 | 3 |
| Mexico | 2 | 1 | | | 1 | | 1 | | 5 |
| Nicaragua | | | | | 1 | | | | 1 |
| Panama | 2 | | 1 | 1 | | | 1 | | 5 |
| Peru | 2 | 1 | 1 | 1 | 2 | 1 | 1 | 1 | 10 |
| Puerto Rico | | 1 | 1 | | | | 1 | 1 | 4 |
| United States | | 1 | 1 | 1 | | 1 | 1 | 1 | 6 |
| Uruguay | | | 1 | 1 | | | | 1 | 3 |
| Venezuela | 2 | | | | | | | | 2 |
| Total: 17 NOCs | 16 | 9 | 10 | 9 | 16 | 9 | 10 | 9 | 88 |

== Men ==
=== Shortboard ===
| Event | Quotas | Qualified |
|---|---|---|
| Host nation | 2 | Chile; Chile |
| ISA World Surfing Games | 5 | Mexico; Peru; Peru; Canada; Mexico |
| PASA Surf Games | 8 | Brazil; Argentina; Panama; Panama; Argentina; Brazil; Costa Rica; Venezuela |
| ALAS Latin Tour | 1 | Venezuela |
| TOTAL | 16 | |

=== SUP surf ===
| Event | Quotas | Qualified |
|---|---|---|
| Host nation | 1 | Chile |
| ISA World SUP Championships | 4 | Brazil; United States; Mexico; Peru |
| PASA Surf Games | 4 | Canada; Puerto Rico; Argentina; Costa Rica |
| TOTAL | 9 | |

=== SUP race ===
| Event | Quotas | Qualified |
|---|---|---|
| Host nation | 1 | Chile |
| ISA World SUP Championships | 4 | United States; Peru; Brazil; Argentina |
| PASA Surf Games | 5 | Puerto Rico; Canada; Panama; Uruguay; Costa Rica |
| TOTAL | 10 | |

=== Longboard ===
| Event | Quotas | Qualified |
|---|---|---|
| Host nation | 1 | Chile |
| ISA World Longboard Championships | 4 | Brazil; Peru; Argentina; United States |
| PASA Surf Games | 4 | Uruguay; Costa Rica; El Salvador; Panama |
| TOTAL | 9 | |

== Women ==
=== Shortboard ===
| Event | Quotas | Qualified |
|---|---|---|
| Host nation | 2 | Chile; Chile |
| ISA World Surfing Games | 5 | Brazil; Canada; Peru; Costa Rica; Peru |
| PASA Surf Games | 8 | Brazil; Barbados; Argentina; Canada; Colombia; Mexico; Argentina; Costa Rica |
| ALAS Latin Tour | 1 | Ecuador |
| TOTAL | 16 | |

=== SUP surf ===
| Event | Quotas | Qualified |
|---|---|---|
| Host nation | 1 | Chile |
| ISA World SUP Championships | 4 | Argentina; Brazil; Colombia; United States |
| PASA Surf Games | 4 | Peru; Canada; Ecuador; El Salvador |
| TOTAL | 9 | |

=== SUP race ===
| Event | Quotas | Qualified |
|---|---|---|
| Host nation | 1 | Chile |
| ISA World SUP Championships | 4 | United States; Costa Rica; Puerto Rico; Brazil |
| PASA Surf Games | 5 | Argentina; Canada; Mexico; Peru; Panama |
| TOTAL | 10 | |

=== Longboard ===
| Event | Quotas | Qualified |
|---|---|---|
| Host nation | 1 | Chile |
| ISA World Longboard Championships | 4 | Peru; Brazil; United States; Canada |
| PASA Surf Games | 4 | Costa Rica; El Salvador; Uruguay; Puerto Rico |
| TOTAL | 9 | |
