= 2015 Pan American Surf Games =

Pan American Surf Games Peru 2015
- Host city: Punta Negra, Lima
- Country: Peru
- Organisers: Pan American Surf Association; Federación Deportiva Nacional de Tabla
- Edition: 11th
- Nations: 11
- Sport: Surfing
- Events: 13 (8 men and 5 women)
- Dates: 2–6 December
- Main venue: Punta Rocas beach

The 2015 Pan American Surf Games, also referred to as PASA Games 2015 and officially named XI Pan American Surfing Games Claro Open 2015 for sponsorship reasons, was the eleventh edition of the Pan American Surf Games, the main competition organized by the Pan American Surf Association. It was held at Punta Rocas beach in Punta Negra District, Lima, Peru from 2 to 6 December 2015.

Athletes from 11 national teams competes in 13 surfing events; comprising Open (Shortboard), SUP surf, SUP race, Bodyboard prone and Paddleboard race each for men and women, plus Longboard, Bodyboard dropknee and Juniors Under–20 (shortboard) events only for men.

Peru won the competition with 11 out of the 13 gold medals at stake. Chile, Ecuador and Venezuela were second, third and fourth respectively.

== Schedule ==
The games were held over a 5-day period, from 2 to 6 December.

== Participating nations ==
10 out of the 26 national associations affiliated to Pan American Surf Association, in addition to Bolivia, entered the competition.

- Argentina
- Bolivia (1)
- Brazil
- Canada
- Chile (18)
- Costa Rica
- Ecuador
- Peru
- Puerto Rico
- Uruguay
- Venezuela

== Medal table ==
* Host nation (Peru)

Rank	Nation	Gold	Silver	Bronze	Total
1	Peru*	11	8	6	25
2	Chile	1	3	4	8
3	Venezuela	1	1	0	2
4	Ecuador	0	1	2	3
5	Canada	0	0	1	1
Totals (5 entries)		13	13	13	39

== Results ==
=== Men's events ===
Event	Gold		Silver		Bronze		Copper	
Open	Alonso Correa; Peru	14.00 pts	Joaquín del Castillo; Peru	12.33 pts	Juninho Urcia; Peru	11.67 pts	Nicolás Vargas; Chile	9.50 pts
Junior	Juninho Urcia; Peru	11.27 pts	Sebastián Correa; Peru	9.90 pts	Lucca Mesinas; Peru	9.39 pts	Alonso Correa; Peru	9.10 pts
Longboard	Lucas Garrido Lecca; Peru	13.40 pts	Miguel Maturana; Chile	11.90 pts	Jorge Vílchez; Peru	8.63 pts	Ignacio Pignataro; Uruguay	8.13 pts
Bodyboard prone	Jorge Hurtado; Peru	11.17 pts	Diego Berríos; Chile	10.23 pts	Nicolás Durán; Chile	6.66 pts	Kevin Torres; Chile	6.57 pts
Bodyboard dropknee	César Bauer; Peru	15.00 pts	Manuel Rodríguez; Peru	12.26 pts	Leonardo Alar; Chile	9.33 pts	Francisco Alvarado; Chile	7.53 pts
SUP surf	José Gómez; Peru	15.33 pts	Tamil Martino; Peru	12.00 pts	José Quintana; Chile	5.46 pts	Sebastián Gómez; Peru	5.10 pts
SUP race	Tamil Martino; Peru	40:15	Itzel Delgado; Peru	43:14	Andrés de la Cruz; Peru	48:43	Alan Vogt; Chile	48:46
Paddleboard race	Luis Escudero; Peru	43:41	Sebastián Ríos; Peru	45:07	Orlando Rufasto; Peru	45:47	Felipe Sepulveda; Chile	50:36

=== Women's events ===
Event	Gold		Silver		Bronze		Copper	
Open	Analí Gómez; Peru	13.90 pts	Dominic Barona; Ecuador	12.40 pts	Melanie Giunta; Peru	6.90 pts	Vania Torres; Peru	6.56 pts
Bodyboard prone	Valentina Díaz; Chile	11.04 pts	Carolina Botteri; Peru	10.70 pts	Macarena Lecaros; Chile	8.17 pts	Ángela López; Peru	5.64 pts
SUP surf	Brissa Málaga; Peru	12.76 pts	Edimar Luque; Venezuela	7.83 pts	Clew Meagher; Canada	5.13 pts	Marina Loayza; Peru	4.03 pts
SUP race	Edimar Luque; Venezuela	51:56	Giannisa Vecco; Peru	55:56	Lisette Prado; Ecuador	1:04:36	Rocío Larrañaga; Peru	1:09:01
Paddleboard race	Rocío Larrañaga; Peru	48:45	Lorena Fica; Chile	51:53	Lisette Prado; Ecuador	1:05:23	Not awarded	—

=== Final ranking per teams ===
The final ranking per teams was drawn up by adding the individual points earning by the best four surfers in the men's Open event, the best two surfers in the women's Open event and the best surfer in the remaining 11 events. Surfers obtained points according to the final position they occupied in each event.

Non-initiators and non-finishers surfers received zero points. Points awarded according to the position were as follows:

Rank	1st place, gold medalist(s)	2nd place, silver medalist(s)	3rd place, bronze medalist(s)	4	5	6	7	8	9	10	11	12	13	14	15	16	17	18	19	20	21	25	33	37	49	61	73	85
Points	1000	860	730	670	610	583	555	528	500	488	475	462	450	438	425	413	400	395	390	385	380	360	320	300	240	180	144	120

The first place of the final ranking per teams was declared as the champion team of the 2016 Pan American Surf Games.

Rank	Team
1st place, gold medalist(s)	Peru
2nd place, silver medalist(s)	Chile
3rd place, bronze medalist(s)	Ecuador
4	Venezuela
5	Brazil
6	Uruguay
7	Argentina
8	Canada
9	Costa Rica
10	Puerto Rico
11	Bolivia
