= 2007 Sporting Cristal season =

Sporting Cristal
2007 season
- Stadium: San Martín de Porres, Lima
- Torneo Descentralizado: Torneo Apertura: Tenth (10°); Torneo Clausura: Sixth (6°); Aggregate Table: Tenth (10°); Tenth National (10°)
Home colours	Away colours	Third colours

The 2007 Sporting Cristal season were the Fifty-Second (52.º) of the club from its foundation in 1955, Fifty-Two (52) participations consecutives in the top-flight of Peruvian Primera División (of 91 Editions) with denomination Torneo Descentralizado. In Previous Season the club qualified as 3rd Place of the 2006 Torneo Descentralizado.

Sporting Cristal were a of twelve (12) clubs in the Forty-Second edition (42.º) Torneo Descentralizado, the competition most important of the Peruvian football. The club played the Peruvian Primera División and Copa Libertadores for Twenty-Seventh (27th) Time.

== Torneo Descentralizado ==
=== Torneo Apertura ===
Pos	Team	Pld	W	D	L	GF	GA	GD	Pts
9	Deportivo Municipal	22	6	6	10	25	30	-5	24
10	Sporting Cristal	22	5	7	10	25	35	-10	22
11	Total Clean	22	6	2	14	28	45	-17	20

== See also ==
- Club Sporting Cristal
- 2007 Torneo Descentralizado
