= 2006 Copa Libertadores =

47th season of Copa Libertadores

2006 Copa Toyota Libertadores de América 2006 Copa Toyota Libertadores da América

Tournament details
- Dates: January 24 – August 16
- Teams: 38 (from 11 associations)

Final positions
- Champions: (Brazil) Internacional (1st title)
- Runners-up: (Brazil) São Paulo

Tournament statistics
- Matches played: 138
- Goals scored: 386 (2.8 per match)
- Top scorer(s): Fourteen players (5 goals each)

The 2006 Copa Toyota Libertadores was the 47th edition of the Copa Libertadores, CONMEBOL's annual football club tournament.

38 teams from 11 football associations took part, starting with the first qualifying round played on 24 January 2006.

Internacional won this edition for their first title, beating São Paulo 4–3 on aggregate.

== Qualified teams ==
Group Stage
(Argentina) Newell's Old Boys	(Argentina) Estudiantes	(Brazil) São Paulo	(Brazil) Corinthians
(Argentina) Vélez Sársfield	(Argentina) Rosario Central	(Brazil) Paulista	(Brazil) Internacional
(Bolivia) Bolívar	(Chile) Unión Española	(Colombia) Deportivo Cali	(Ecuador) LDU Quito
(Bolivia) The Strongest	(Chile) Universidad Católica	(Colombia) Atlético Nacional	(Ecuador) El Nacional
(Paraguay) Cerro Porteño	(Peru) Cienciano	(Uruguay) Nacional	(Venezuela) Unión Atlético Maracaibo
(Paraguay) Libertad	(Peru) Sporting Cristal	(Uruguay) Rocha	(Venezuela) Caracas
(Mexico) UNAM	(Mexico) UANL		
First stage
(Argentina) River Plate	(Brazil) Goias	(Brazil) Palmeiras	(Bolivia) Oriente Petrolero
(Chile) Colo-Colo	(Colombia) Santa Fe	(Ecuador) Cuenca	(Paraguay) Nacional
(Peru) Universitario	(Uruguay) Defensor Sporting	(Venezuela) Deportivo Táchira	(Mexico) Guadalajara

== First stage ==
Teams in the Team #1 column played at home in the first leg.

Team 1	Agg.	Team 2	1st leg	2nd leg
Nacional (Paraguay)	2–2 (a)	(Peru) Universitario	2–2	0–0
Defensor Sporting (Uruguay)	2–2 (a)	(Colombia) Santa Fe	2–2	0–0
River Plate (Argentina)	8–0	(Bolivia) Oriente Petrolero	6–0	2–0
Colo-Colo (Chile)	4–8	(Mexico) Guadalajara	1–3	3–5
Palmeiras (Brazil)	6–2	(Venezuela) Deportivo Táchira	2–0	4–2
Deportivo Cuenca (Ecuador)	1–4	(Brazil) Goias	1–1	0–3

=== Matches ===
==== First leg ====
2006-01-24

Nacional (Paraguay)	2–2	(Peru) Universitario
Centurion 62' (o.g.); Moisela 66' (o.g.)	Report	Moisela 64'; Sangoy 90'

Estadio Monumental, Asunción
Referee: Sergio Pezzotta (Argentina)

2006-01-27

Defensor Sporting (Uruguay)	2–2	(Colombia) Santa Fe
Olivera 86'; Ithurralde 90'	Report	Olveira 35'; Preciado 81'

Estadio Luis Franzini, Montevideo
Referee: Heber Lopes (Brazil)

2006-01-26

River Plate (Argentina)	6–0	(Bolivia) Oriente Petrolero
Santana 20'; Montenegro 37'; Gallardo 39' (pen.) 57' (pen.); Farías 43'; San Martín 46'	Report

River Plate Stadium, Buenos Aires
Referee: Rubén Selman (Chile)

2006-01-24

Colo-Colo (Chile)	1–3	(Mexico) Guadalajara
Fernández 49'	Report	Bravo 35' 52'; Morales 46' (pen.)

Estadio Monumental David Arellano, Santiago
Referee: Roberto Silvera (Uruguay)

2006-01-25

Palmeiras (Brazil)	2–0	(Venezuela) Deportivo Táchira
Marcinho 19'; Gamarra 49'	Report

Estádio Palestra Itália, São Paulo
Referee: Ricardo Grance (Paraguay)

2006-01-26

Deportivo Cuenca (Ecuador)	1–1	(Brazil) Goiás
Matamoros 57'	(Report)	Rogério Corrêa 14'

Estadio Alejandro Serrano Aguilar, Cuenca
Referee: Victor Hugo Rivera (Peru)

==== Second leg ====
2006-01-31

Universitario (Peru)	0–0	(Paraguay) Nacional
	Report

Estadio Monumental "U", Lima
Referee: Carlos Lopez (Colombia)

2006-02-02

Santa Fe (Colombia)	0–0	(Uruguay) Defensor Sporting
	Report

Estadio El Campín, Bogotá
Referee: Mauricio Reinoso (Ecuador)

2006-02-02

Oriente Petrolero (Bolivia)	0–2	(Argentina) River Plate
	Report	Toja 15'; Vaca 23' (o.g.)

Estadio Tahuichi Aguilera, Santa Cruz
Referee: Salvio Fagundes (Brazil)

2006-01-31

Guadalajara (Mexico)	5–3	(Chile) Colo-Colo
Medina 24' 78'; Santana 34'; Rodríguez 36'; Bautista 81'	Report	Suazo 39' 67' 76'

Estadio Jalisco, Guadalajara
Referee: Gustavo Brand (Venezuela)

2006-02-01

Deportivo Táchira (Venezuela)	2–4	(Brazil) Palmeiras
García 69'; González 73'	Report	Washington 13' 45'; Edmundo 60'; Marcinho 73'

Estadio Polideportivo de Pueblo Nuevo, San Cristóbal
Referee: Óscar Ruiz (Colombia)

2006-02-01

Goiás (Brazil)	3–0	(Ecuador) Deportivo Cuenca
Jadílson 29'; Romerito 75' 81' (pen.)	Report

Estádio Serra Dourada, Goiânia
Referee: Martín Vázquez (Uruguay)

== Group stage ==
6 winners from the qualifying round and the 26 pre-qualified clubs are drawn into 8 groups of 4 teams each. The top 2 teams in each group will advance to the Libertadores Cup play-offs.

Tiebreakers, if necessary, are applied in the following order:

1. Cumulative goal difference.
2. Total goals scored.
3. Away goals scored.
4. Sorting

=== Group 1 ===
Pos	Team	Pld	W	D	L	GF	GA	GD	Pts	SÃO	GDL	CAR	CIE
1	(Brazil) São Paulo	6	4	0	2	12	6	+6	12		1–2	2–0	4–1
2	(Mexico) Guadalajara	6	3	3	0	6	3	+3	12	2–1		1–1	0–0
3	(Venezuela) Caracas	6	1	2	3	7	7	0	5	1–2	0–0		4–0
4	(Peru) Cienciano	6	1	1	4	3	12	−9	4	0–2	0–1	2–1	

Legend: Blue = home team win; Yellow = draw; Red = away team win.

=== Group 2 ===
Pos	Team	Pld	W	D	L	GF	GA	GD	Pts	ISF	ELP	SPC	BOL
1	(Colombia) Santa Fe	6	3	1	2	9	7	+2	10		3–1	2–1	2–2
2	(Argentina) Estudiantes	6	3	1	2	10	10	0	10	1–0		4–3	2–1
3	(Peru) Sporting Cristal	6	2	1	3	11	12	−1	7	1–2	2–2		2–1
4	(Bolivia) Bolivar	6	2	1	3	7	8	−1	7	1–0	1–0	1–2	

Legend: Blue = home team win; Yellow = draw; Red = away team win.

=== Group 3 ===
Pos	Team	Pld	W	D	L	GF	GA	GD	Pts	GOI	NOB	UE	STR
1	(Brazil) Goiás	6	3	2	1	7	1	+6	11		3–0	0–0	2–0
2	(Argentina) Newell's Old Boys	6	2	2	2	7	7	0	8	0–0		2–0	2–0
3	(Chile) Unión Española	6	2	2	2	3	5	−2	8	0–2	1–1		1–0
4	(Bolivia) The Strongest	6	2	0	4	4	8	−4	6	1–0	3–2	0–1	

Legend: Blue = home team win; Yellow = draw; Red = away team win.

=== Group 4 ===
Pos	Team	Pld	W	D	L	GF	GA	GD	Pts	COR	UANL	UC	CALI
1	(Brazil) Corinthians	6	4	1	1	10	6	+4	13		1–0	2–2	3–0
2	(Mexico) UANL	6	3	1	2	12	10	+2	10	2–0		1–0	5–4
3	(Chile) Universidad Católica	6	3	1	2	12	11	+1	10	2–3	3–2		2–1
4	(Colombia) Deportivo Cali	6	0	1	5	9	16	−7	1	0–1	2–2	2–3	

Legend: Blue = home team win; Yellow = draw; Red = away team win.

=== Group 5 ===
Pos	Team	Pld	W	D	L	GF	GA	GD	Pts	VEL	LDU	ROC	UNI
1	(Argentina) Vélez Sársfield	6	5	1	0	18	6	+12	16		2–2	3–0	4–3
2	(Ecuador) LDU Quito	6	3	1	2	16	9	+7	10	1–3		5–0	4–0
3	(Uruguay) Rocha	6	1	2	3	4	16	−12	5	0–5	3–2		0–0
4	(Peru) Universitario	6	0	2	4	5	12	−7	2	0–1	1–2	1–1	

Legend: Blue = home team win; Yellow = draw; Red = away team win.

=== Group 6 ===
Pos	Team	Pld	W	D	L	GF	GA	GD	Pts	INT	NAC	MBO	UNAM
1	(Brazil) Internacional	6	4	2	0	13	4	+9	14		3–0	4–0	3–2
2	(Uruguay) Nacional	6	2	3	1	6	6	0	9	0–0		0–0	2–0
3	(Venezuela) Unión Atlético Maracaibo	6	2	2	2	7	8	−1	8	1–1	2–3		3–0
4	(Mexico) UNAM	6	0	1	5	4	12	−8	1	1–2	1–1	0–1	

Legend: Blue = home team win; Yellow = draw; Red = away team win.

=== Group 7 ===
Pos	Team	Pld	W	D	L	GF	GA	GD	Pts	AN	PAL	CER	CEN
1	(Colombia) Atlético Nacional	6	3	1	2	13	9	+4	10		1–2	2–2	1–0
2	(Brazil) Palmeiras	6	2	3	1	9	8	+1	9	3–2		2–3	0–0
3	(Paraguay) Cerro Porteño	6	2	2	2	9	12	−3	8	1–5	0–0		1–3
4	(Argentina) Rosario Central	6	1	2	3	6	8	−2	5	1–2	2–2	0–2	

Legend: Blue = home team win; Yellow = draw; Red = away team win.

=== Group 8 ===
Pos	Team	Pld	W	D	L	GF	GA	GD	Pts	LIB	RIV	ELN	PAU
1	(Paraguay) Libertad	6	3	2	1	8	3	+5	11		2–0	4–1	1–0
2	(Argentina) River Plate	6	3	0	3	10	10	0	9	1–0		4–3	4–1
3	(Ecuador) El Nacional	6	1	3	2	8	10	−2	6	1–1	2–0		1–1
4	(Brazil) Paulista	6	1	3	2	4	7	−3	6	0–0	2–1	0–0	

Legend: Blue = home team win; Yellow = draw; Red = away team win.

== Knockout stages ==
The teams were seeded 1 to 8 (first placed teams of each group) and 9 to 16 (second placed teams of each group) and the ties were 1 vs 16, 2 vs 15, etc.

=== Qualified teams ===
Seed	Team	Pld	Pts	GD	Qualification
1	(Argentina) Vélez Sársfield	6	16	+12	Qualified as first place
2	(Brazil) Internacional	6	14	+9	Qualified as first place
3	(Brazil) Corinthians	6	13	+4	Qualified as first place
4	(Brazil) São Paulo	6	12	+6	Qualified as first place
5	(Brazil) Goiás	6	11	+6	Qualified as first place
6	(Paraguay) Libertad	6	11	+5	Qualified as first place
7	(Colombia) Atlético Nacional	6	10	+4	Qualified as first place
8	(Colombia) Santa Fe	6	10	+2	Qualified as first place
9	(Mexico) Guadalajara	6	12	+3	Qualified as second place
10	(Ecuador) LDU Quito	6	10	+7	Qualified as second place
11	(Mexico) UANL	6	10	+2	Qualified as second place
12	(Argentina) Estudiantes	6	10	0	Qualified as second place
13	(Brazil) Palmeiras	6	9	+1	Qualified as second place
14	(Argentina) River Plate	6	9	+0	Qualified as second place
15	(Uruguay) Nacional	6	9	+0	Qualified as second place
16	(Argentina) Newell's Old Boys	6	8	+0	Qualified as second place

=== Bracket ===
Round of 16
2	(Brazil) Internacional	2	0	2
15	(Uruguay) Nacional	1	0	1
7	(Colombia) Atlético Nacional	0	0	0
10	(Ecuador) LDU Quito	4	1	5
6	(Paraguay) Libertad	0	0	0 (5)
11	(Mexico) UANL	0	0	0 (3)
3	(Brazil) Corinthians	2	1	3
14	(Argentina) River Plate	3	3	6
4	(Brazil) São Paulo	1	2	3
13	(Brazil) Palmeiras	1	1	2
5	(Brazil) Goiás	0	3	3
12	(Argentina) Estudiantes (a)	2	1	3
1	(Argentina) Vélez Sársfield	4	2	6
16	(Argentina) Newell's Old Boys	2	2	4
8	(Colombia) Santa Fe	0	3	3
9	(Mexico) Guadalajara	3	1	4

Quarterfinals
2	(Brazil) Internacional	1	2	3
10	(Ecuador) LDU Quito	2	0	2
6	(Paraguay) Libertad	2	3	5
14	(Argentina) River Plate	2	1	3
4	(Brazil) São Paulo	0	1	1 (4)
12	(Argentina) Estudiantes	1	0	1 (3)
1	(Argentina) Vélez Sársfield	0	1	1
9	(Mexico) Guadalajara	0	2	2

Semifinals
2	(Brazil) Internacional	0	2	2
6	(Paraguay) Libertad	0	0	0
4	(Brazil) São Paulo	1	3	4
9	(Mexico) Guadalajara	0	0	0

Final
2	(Brazil) Internacional	2	2	4
4	(Brazil) São Paulo	1	2	3

=== Round of 16 ===
Teams				Scores		Tie-breakers		
1st leg home team	Points		2nd leg home team	1st leg	2nd leg	GF	AG	Pen.
Newell's Old Boys (Argentina)	1	4	(Argentina) Vélez Sársfield	2–4	2–2	—	—	—
Nacional (Uruguay)	1	4	(Brazil) Internacional	1–2	0–0	—	—	—
River Plate (Argentina)	6	0	(Brazil) Corinthians	3–2	3–1	—	—	—
Palmeiras (Brazil)	1	4	(Brazil) São Paulo	1–1	1–2	—	—	—
Estudiantes (Argentina)	3	3	(Brazil) Goiás	2–0	1–3	3–3	1–0	—
UANL (Mexico)	2	2	(Paraguay) Libertad	0–0	0–0	0–0	0–0	3–5
LDU Quito (Ecuador)	6	0	(Colombia) Atlético Nacional	4–0	1–0	—	—	—
Guadalajara (Mexico)	3	3	(Colombia) Santa Fe	3–0	1–3	4–3	—	—

=== Quarter-finals ===
Teams				Scores		Tie-breakers		
1st leg home team	Points		2nd leg home team	1st leg	2nd leg	GF	AG	Pen.
Guadalajara (Mexico)	2	1	(Argentina) Vélez Sársfield	0–0	2–1	—	—	—
LDU Quito (Ecuador)	2	3	(Brazil) Internacional	2–1	0–2	2–3	—	—
Estudiantes (Argentina)	3	3	(Brazil) São Paulo	1–0	0–1	1–1	0–0	3–4
River Plate (Argentina)	1	4	(Paraguay) Libertad	2–2	1–3	—	—	—

=== Semi-finals ===
Teams				Scores		Tie-breakers		
1st leg home team	Points		2nd leg home team	1st leg	2nd leg	GF	AG	Pen.
Libertad (Paraguay)	1	4	(Brazil) Internacional	0–0	0–2	—	—	—
Guadalajara (Mexico)	0	6	(Brazil) São Paulo	0–1	0–3	—	—	—

=== Finals ===
Teams				Scores		Tie-breakers		
1st leg home team	Points		2nd leg home team	1st leg	2nd leg	GF	AG	Pen.
São Paulo (Brazil)	1	4	(Brazil) Internacional	1–2	2–2	—	—	—

Copa Libertadores de América
2006 champion

First title

== Top goalscorers ==
Player	Team	Goals
(Brazil) Aloísio	(Brazil) São Paulo	5
(Ecuador) Félix Borja	(Ecuador) El Nacional	5
(Argentina) José Luis Calderón	(Argentina) Estudiantes	5
(Ecuador) Agustín Delgado	(Ecuador) LDU Quito	5
(Argentina) Sebastián Ereros	(Argentina) Vélez Sársfield	5
(Argentina) Ernesto Farías	(Argentina) River Plate	5
(Brazil) Fernandão	(Brazil) Internacional	5
(Brazil) Marcinho	(Brazil) Palmeiras	5
(Argentina) Daniel Montenegro	(Argentina) River Plate	5
(Brazil) Nilmar	(Brazil) Corinthians	5
(Argentina) Mariano Pavone	(Argentina) Estudiantes	5
(Argentina) Jorge Quinteros	(Chile) Universidad Católica	5
(Ecuador) Patricio Urrutia	(Ecuador) LDU Quito	5
(Brazil) Washington	(Brazil) Palmeiras	5

== See also ==
- 2006 FIFA Club World Cup
- 2007 Recopa Sudamericana
