= 2022 Pan American Surf Games – Women's SUP surf =

Women's SUP surf at the 2022 Pan American Surf Games
- Venue: Playa Venao
- Dates: 8–11 August 2022
- Winning score: 13.00 pts

Medalists
gold medal	Lucía Cosoleto	Argentina
silver medal	Vania Torres	Peru
bronze medal	Aline Adisaka	Brazil

The women's SUP surf competition at the 2022 Pan American Surf Games was held at Playa Venao in Pedasí District, Panama from 8 to 11 August 2022.

== Competition format ==
The competition consisted of four rounds:

- Round 1: 6 heats, 5 heats of 3 surfers and 1 of 4. The top 2 in each heat (12 total) advanced to quarter-finals.
- Quarter-finals: 4 heats of 3 surfers each; the top 2 in each heat (8 total) advanced to semi-finals.
- Semi-finals: 2 heats of 4 surfers each; the top 2 in each heat (4 total) advanced to the final.
- Final: 1 heat of 4 surfers, with the top three earning medals.

The length of each heat was 20 minutes. Scoring for each wave taken by the surfers is an average of 5 scores given by 5 judges, ranging from 0.1 to 10 points. The best two waves for each surfer counting and are added to obtain the total score.

== Results ==
=== Round 1 ===
==== Heat 1 ====
Rank	Surfer	Nation	Waves						Total score	Notes
Rank	Surfer	Nation	1	2	3	4	5	6	Total score	Notes
1	Natalia de la Lama	Argentina	2.00	1.60	2.83	5.00			7.83	QF
2	Lisette Prado	Ecuador	0.67	2.40	0.37	1.07	3.50	0.77	5.90	QF
3	Celia Barbosa	Uruguay							0.00	E

==== Heat 2 ====
Rank	Surfer	Nation	Waves							Total score	Notes
Rank	Surfer	Nation	1	2	3	4	5	6	7	Total score	Notes
1	Aline Adisaka	Brazil	5.83	2.97	7.83	4.13				13.66	QF
2	Nimsay Garcia	Puerto Rico	2.50	2.30	1.90	1.67	2.43	4.33	1.50	6.83	QF
3	Aída Ramos	Mexico	3.17	1.00	3.53	2.37	2.57			6.70	E

==== Heat 3 ====
Rank	Surfer	Nation	Waves							Total score	Notes
Rank	Surfer	Nation	1	2	3	4	5	6	7	Total score	Notes
1	Edimar Luque	Venezuela	2.17	2.23	5.33	4.00	3.63	2.80		9.33	QF
2	Amanda Rivera	Puerto Rico	3.50	2.93	4.17	2.47	2.20	2.07	3.60	7.77	QF
3	María Celeste Ruiz	Peru	2.00	2.03	2.87	1.00	0.83	2.37		5.24	E

==== Heat 4 ====
Rank	Surfer	Nation	Waves							Total score	Notes
Rank	Surfer	Nation	1	2	3	4	5	6	7	Total score	Notes
1	Vania Torres	Peru	2.67	3.17	7.00	7.67	6.33	5.00	3.90	14.67	QF
2	Estela López	Chile	1.00	1.40	1.27	2.33	3.00	0.50	1.17	5.33	QF
3	Kelly Prada	Venezuela	1.93							1.93	E

==== Heat 5 ====
Rank	Surfer	Nation	Waves									Total score	Notes
Rank	Surfer	Nation	1	2	3	4	5	6	7	8	9	Total score	Notes
1	Gabriela Sztamfater	Brazil	1.00	2.83	4.00	4.83	1.00	1.13	3.63	3.50	3.97	8.83	QF
2	Karen Jacobson	Mexico	2.00	2.50	4.17	2.23	1.47					6.67	QF
3	Marcela Machado	Uruguay	1.23									1.23	E

==== Heat 6 ====
Rank	Surfer	Nation	Waves								Total score	Notes
Rank	Surfer	Nation	1	2	3	4	5	6	7	8	Total score	Notes
1	Lucía Cosoleto	Argentina	5.50	4.50	6.33	0.63	3.77	3.00	5.93		12.26	QF
2	Xiomara Bowen	Ecuador	0.67	3.00	1.60	1.67	2.10	2.60	0.63	2.43	5.60	QF
3	Eileen Pitii	Panama	0.53	0.43							0.96	E
4	María Cristina Canales	Panama	0.83								0.83	E

=== Quarter-finals ===
==== Heat 7 ====
Rank	Surfer	Nation	Waves									Total score	Notes
Rank	Surfer	Nation	1	2	3	4	5	6	7	8	9	Total score	Notes
1	Aline Adisaka	Brazil	1.33	4.73	6.33	5.23	4.83	3.47				11.56	SF
2	Natalia de la Lama	Argentina	0.83	4.33	3.00	4.33	1.03	3.37	2.67	2.03	2.50	8.66	SF
3	Amanda Rivera	Puerto Rico	2.33	2.13	2.57	2.83	1.60					5.40	E

==== Heat 8 ====
Rank	Surfer	Nation	Waves							Total score	Notes
Rank	Surfer	Nation	1	2	3	4	5	6	7	Total score	Notes
1	Lisette Prado	Ecuador	5.50	4.60	4.53	0.93	0.97	0.50	2.73	10.10	SF
2	Nimsay Garcia	Puerto Rico	4.50	3.97	1.83	3.33				8.47	SF
3	Edimar Luque	Venezuela	2.00	1.30	1.27	1.47	2.27	1.90		4.27	E

==== Heat 9 ====
Rank	Surfer	Nation	Waves									Total score	Notes
Rank	Surfer	Nation	1	2	3	4	5	6	7	8	9	Total score	Notes
1	Vania Torres	Peru	3.83	5.50	1.00	4.50	1.10	4.37				10.00	SF
2	Gabriela Sztamfater	Brazil	1.77	3.17	3.20	5.10	3.87	0.90				8.97	SF
3	Xiomara Bowen	Ecuador	0.50	1.50	2.20	2.33	2.30	2.03	3.17	1.03	2.77	5.94	E

==== Heat 10 ====
Rank	Surfer	Nation	Waves								Total score	Notes
Rank	Surfer	Nation	1	2	3	4	5	6	7	8	Total score	Notes
1	Lucía Cosoleto	Argentina	5.33	3.50	1.17	4.40	6.00	3.67	5.50	5.20	11.50	SF
2	Karen Jacobson	Mexico	2.17	1.30	2.60	2.63	1.90	2.73			5.36	SF
3	Estela López	Chile	1.00	0.57	1.77	1.10	1.27	1.17	1.73		3.50	E

=== Semi-finals ===
==== Heat 11 ====
Rank	Surfer	Nation	Waves						Total score	Notes
Rank	Surfer	Nation	1	2	3	4	5	6	Total score	Notes
1	Gabriela Sztamfater	Brazil	3.33	6.83	3.50	7.33	6.43	3.90	14.16	F
2	Aline Adisaka	Brazil	1.50	3.27	5.00				8.27	F
3	Karen Jacobson	Mexico	3.73	2.57	3.23				6.96	E
4	Lisette Prado	Ecuador	2.00	2.53	1.80	1.03	2.37		4.90	E

==== Heat 12 ====
Rank	Surfer	Nation	Waves									Total score	Notes
Rank	Surfer	Nation	1	2	3	4	5	6	7	8	9	Total score	Notes
1	Lucía Cosoleto	Argentina	2.77	4.67	6.00	2.97	6.43	3.40	1.07	7.40	4.50	13.83	F
2	Vania Torres	Peru	6.50	3.33	0.67	6.50	5.17	4.73	2.23			13.00	F
3	Natalia de la Lama	Argentina	1.67	2.27	1.83	2.93	1.90	2.13	2.83			5.76	E
4	Nimsay Garcia	Puerto Rico	2.30	1.57	2.17	1.43	1.70	1.87	0.43			4.47	E

=== Final ===
==== Heat 13 ====
Rank	Surfer	Nation	Waves							Total score	Notes
Rank	Surfer	Nation	1	2	3	4	5	6	7	Total score	Notes
1st place, gold medalist(s)	Lucía Cosoleto	Argentina	4.50	7.00	6.00	2.93	1.33	3.50		13.00	
2nd place, silver medalist(s)	Vania Torres	Peru	0.83	0.60	3.77	2.33	0.57	7.50	3.90	11.40	
3rd place, bronze medalist(s)	Aline Adisaka	Brazil	0.93	0.63	3.87	2.20	0.47	3.23		7.10	
	Gabriela Sztamfater	Brazil	2.67	1.93	3.00	0.83	0.73	2.87		5.87	
