= Alonso Correa =

Olympic surfer from Peru

Personal information
- Born: 3 January 1998 (age 28) Lima, Peru

Surfing career
- Sport: Surfing

Surfing specifications
- Stance: Goofy
Medal record
Men's surfing
Representing Peru
World Games
Gold medal – first place	2023 La Bocana	Team
Silver medal – second place	2025 Surf City	Team
Pan American Surf Games
Gold medal – first place	2015 Punta Negra	Open
Gold medal – first place	2017 Punta Negra	Open
Bronze medal – third place	2018 Punta Negra	Open
South American Beach Games
Silver medal – second place	2023 Santa Marta	Shortboard

Alonso Correa (born 3 January 1998) is a Peruvian professional surfer. Correa won the gold medal the in Men's Open during the Pan American Surf Games twice, in 2015 and 2017, and the bronze in 2018. During the 2023 ISA World Surfing Games, Correa won gold as a member of the Peruvian team. He qualified for the 2024 Olympic Games.

== Personal life ==
Correa was born in Peru. His family is from Lobitos, and he has one older brother. His father, Augusto, took Correa and his brother surfing throughout Lobitos as children. Correa began competing in events at age 10.

Correa currently lives in Punta Hermosa.

== Career ==
Correa won gold in the Men's Open during the 2015 Pan American Surf Games, when he was just 17 years old.

Correa won the gold medal in the 2017 Pan American Surf Games, defeating Chilean surfer Maximiliano Cross.

in 2018, Correa won his first World Surf League Qualifying Series in Copa Triathlon Reef Pro, defeating fellow Peruvian Miguel Tudela.

In the 2018 Pan American Surf Games, Correa won bronze.

Correa won his second WSL QS in 2023, at Copa Sails of Change Galápagos.

Correa won gold with the Peruvian team in the 2023 ISA World Surfing Games.

In 2024, Correa won the Billabong Señoritas Open Pro.

During the 2024 ISA World Surfing Games, Correa qualified for the 2024 Summer Olympics.
