= Vania Torres =

Peruvian surfer

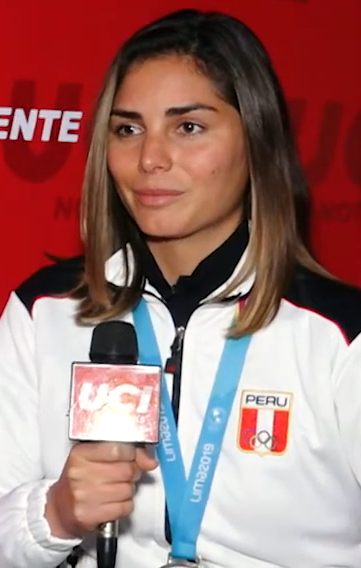

Personal information
- Born: 6 November 1995 (age 30)

Sport
- Country: Peru
- Sport: Surfing
- Coached by: Ian Cairns
Medal record
Representing Peru
Women's surfing
Pan American Games
Silver medal – second place	2019 Lima	SUP surf
Bronze medal – third place	2023 Santiago	SUP surf
Pan American Surf Games
Bronze medal – third place	2015 Punta Negra	Open
Silver medal – second place	2016 Miraflores District	Paddleboard race
Gold medal – first place	2017 Punta Negra	SUP surf
Silver medal – second place	2018 Punta Negra	SUP surf
Silver medal – second place	2022 Pedasí	SUP surf
Silver medal – second place	2023 Santa Catalina	SUP surf
South American Beach Games
Gold medal – first place	2023 Santa Marta	SUP surf

Vania Torres (born 6 November 1995) is a Peruvian surfer. She competed at the 2023 Pan American Games, winning the bronze medal in the women's SUP surf event.

In the television field, she is also recognized for her participation in programs on América Televisión such as the telenovelas Perdóname and Junta de vecinos, and the reality show Esto es guerra.
