= 2007 FBC Melgar season =

FBC Melgar
2007 season
- Stadium: Estadio Melgar; Estadio Monumental Virgen de Chapi
- Torneo Descentralizado: Torneo Apertura: Seventh (7°); Torneo Clausura: Eighth (8°); Aggregate Table: Eighth (8°); Eighth National (8°)
Home colours	Away colours	Third colours

The 2007 FBC Melgar season were the Ninety-Third (93.º) of the club from its foundation in 1915, Thirty-Eight (38) participations in the top-flight of Peruvian Primera División (of 91 Editions) with denomination Torneo Descentralizado. In Previous Season the club qualified as 7th Place of the 2006 Torneo Descentralizado.

Melgar were a of twelve (12) clubs in the Forty-Second edition (42.º) Torneo Descentralizado, the competition most important of the Peruvian football. The club played the Peruvian Primera División.

== Torneo Descentralizado ==
=== Torneo Apertura ===
Pos	Team	Pld	W	D	L	GF	GA	GD	Pts
10	Alianza Lima^{1}	22	9	8	5	31	23	+8	31
11	Melgar	22	8	5	9	32	38	-6	29
12	Alianza Atlético	22	6	10	6	23	23	0	28

== See also ==
- FBC Melgar
- 2007 Torneo Descentralizado
