= Wenceslao Fernández =

Peruvian footballer (born 1979)

Personal information
- Full name: Wenceslao Ernesto Fernández Donayre
- Date of birth: August 14, 1979 (age 47)
- Place of birth: Lima, Peru
- Height: 1.75 m (5 ft 9 in)
- Position: Full-back

Youth career
- Alianza Lima

Senior career*
Years	Team	Apps	(Gls)
2000–2002	Alianza Lima	64	(1)
2003	Sport Boys	22	(0)
2004–2005	Alianza Lima	57	(1)
2006–2007	Univ. San Martín	57	(0)
2008–2011	Sporting Cristal	73	(1)
2012–2013	Unión Comercio	22	(0)
2013	Defensor San Alejandro	21	(0)
2014	Carlos A. Mannucci	27	(0)
Total		343	(3)

International career
2006–2009	Peru	6	(0)
- * Club domestic league appearances and goals

Wenceslao Ernesto Fernández Donayre (born August 14, 1979) is a Peruvian former professional footballer who played as full-back.

== Club career ==
Born in Lima, Perú, Fernández started his playing career with Alianza Lima. He has also played for the clubs Sport Boys and Universidad San Martín de Porres. In his second season with Universidad San Martín, Fernández helped his club win the Torneo Apertura and finish as champions in the 2007 Torneo Descentralizado. In 2008, he joined Sporting Cristal.

== International career ==
Fernández made six appearances for the Peru national team.

== Honours ==
Universidad San Martín

- Torneo Apertura: 2007
- Peruvian First Division: 2007
