= 2023 Pan American Surfing Games =

Pan American Surf Games Panama 2023
- Host city: Santa Catalina town
- Country: Panama
- Organisers: Pan American Surf Association; Asociación Panameña de Surf
- Edition: 16th
- Nations: 19
- Athletes: 234
- Sport: Surfing
- Events: 8 (4 men and 4 women)
- Dates: 21–30 April
- Opened by: Alcides Hidalgo (Mayor of Soná)
- Main venue: Playa Santa Catalina
- Website: Panama 2023

The 2023 Pan American Surf Games, also known as 2023 PASA Games, was the sixteenth edition of the Pan American Surfing Games, the main competition organized by the Pan American Surf Association. It was held at Playa Santa Catalina in Soná District, Panama from 21 to 30 April 2023.

More than 270 athletes from 19 national teams competed in 8 surfing events; comprising Shortboard, Longboard, SUP surf and SUP race each for men and women.

The competition awarded 42 individual qualification slots for the surfing competitions at the 2023 Pan American Games.

Defending champions Brazil won the competition again with a total of 12,430 points and 4 out of the 8 gold medals at stake. Argentina finished second with 11,540 points and 2 gold medals. Peru (11,338 points and 1 gold medal) and Canada (10,978 points and 1 gold medal) were third and fourth respectively.

== Schedule ==
The games were held over a 10-day period, from 21 to 30 April. The opening ceremony took place on 21 April, with the competitions starting on 22 April.

QR1	Qualifying round 1	QR2	Qualifying round 2	QR3	Qualifying round 3	QR4	Qualifying round 4	SF	Semi-finals	F	Final

Event↓/Date →	Sat 22	Sun 23	Mon 24	Tue 25	Wed 26	Thu 27	Fri 28		Sat 29		Sun 30	
Men's Shortboard					QR1 (24)	QR2 (12)			QR3 (6)	QR4 (4)	SF (2)	F (1)
Men's Longboard			QR1 (12)			QR2 (6)	QR3 (4)		SF (2)	F (1)		
Men's SUP surf				QR1 (6)			QR2 (3)		SF (2)	F (1)		
Men's SUP race		F (1)										
Women's Shortboard				QR1 (16)			QR2 (8)		QR3 (4)		SF (2)	F (1)
Women's Longboard	QR1 (8)	QR2 (4)					SF (2)	F (1)				
Women's SUP surf			QR1 (6)			QR2 (3)	SF (2)	F (1)				
Women's SUP race		F (1)										
Heats (Total 146)	8	6	18	22	24	21	21		20		6	

== Participating nations ==
19 out of the 26 national associations affiliated to Pan American Surf Association entered the competition. Each nation was able to enter a maximum of 20 surfers (10 men and 10 women), with up to 4 surfers per gender in the Shortboard event and up to 2 surfers per gender in each Longboard, SUP surf and SUP race events.

- Argentina (18)
- Barbados (6)
- Brazil (20)
- Canada
- Chile
- Colombia
- Costa Rica (17)
- Dominican Republic (4)
- Ecuador
- El Salvador (12)
- Guatemala (13)
- Mexico
- Nicaragua
- Panama
- Peru (20)
- Puerto Rico
- United States
- Uruguay (11)
- Venezuela

== Medal table ==
* Host nation (Panama)

Rank	Nation	Gold	Silver	Bronze	Total
1	Brazil	4	1	3	8
2	Argentina	2	0	4	6
3	Canada	1	3	0	4
4	Peru	1	2	0	3
5	Barbados	0	1	0	1
5	Uruguay	0	1	0	1
7	Costa Rica	0	0	1	1
Totals (7 entries)		8	8	8	24

== Results ==
=== Men's events ===
Event	Gold		Silver		Bronze		Copper	
Shortboard	Krystian Kymerson; Brazil	17.04 pts	Cody Young; Canada	16.44 pts	Leandro Usuna; Argentina	14.10 pts	Isauro Elizondo; Panama	13.13 pts
Longboard	Piccolo Clemente; Peru	15.46 pts	Julián Schweizer; Uruguay	15.03 pts	Carlos Bahia; Brazil	14.73 pts	Anthony Mesén; Costa Rica	9.96 pts
SUP surf	Finn Spencer; Canada	15.00 pts	Wellington Reis; Brazil	13.86 pts	Luiz Diniz; Brazil	12.20 pts	Jeffrey Spencer; Canada	9.63 pts
SUP race	Guilherme Batista; Brazil	44:24	Itzel Delgado; Peru	46:08	Franco Faccín; Argentina	46:53	Santino Basaldella; Argentina	47:09

=== Women's events ===
Event	Gold		Silver		Bronze		Copper	
Shortboard	Silvana Lima; Brazil	13.16 pts	Chelsea Tuach; Barbados	9.77 pts	Lucía Indurain; Argentina	9.50 pts	Sanoa Olin; Canada	7.60 pts
Longboard	Chloé Calmon; Brazil	11.00 pts	Olivia Stokes; Canada	8.40 pts	Lia Díaz; Costa Rica	4.77 pts	Sindy Portillo; El Salvador	4.50 pts
SUP surf	Lucía Cosoleto; Argentina	10.87 pts	Vania Torres; Peru	8.80 pts	Aline Adisaka; Brazil	8.77 pts	Brissa Málaga; Peru	2.40 pts
SUP race	Juliana González; Argentina	49:07	Lina Augaitis; Canada	51:25	Natalia de la Lama; Argentina	52:22	Maricarmen Rivera; Puerto Rico	52:50

=== Final ranking per teams ===
The final ranking per teams was drawn up by adding each surfer's individual points earning in the events in which they competed. Surfers obtained points according to the final position they occupied in each event. In Open, Longboard and SUP surf events, the surfers eliminated before the final occupied a certain position, as follows:

- Eliminated in round 1:
  - Men's Shortboard: 49th place (3rd place of each heat)
  - Women's Shortboard: 33th place (3rd place of each heat) and 49th place (4th place of each heat)
  - Men's Longboard: 25h place (3rd place of each heat)
  - Women's Longboard: 17th place (3rd place of each heat)
  - SUP surf for both genders: 13th place (3rd place of each heat) and 19th place (4th place of each heat)
- Eliminated in round 2:
  - Men's Shortboard: 25th place (3rd place of each heat) and 37th place (4th place of each heat)
  - Women's Shortboard: 17th place (3rd place of each heat) and 25th place (4th place of each heat)
  - Men's Longboard: 13th place (3rd place of each heat) and 19th place (4th place of each heat)
  - Women's Longboard: 9th place (3rd place of each heat) and 3th place (4th place of each heat)
  - SUP surf for both genders: 7th place (3rd place of each heat) and 10th place (4th place of each heat)
- Eliminated in round 3:
  - Men's Shortboard: 13th place (3rd place of each heat) and 19th place (4th place of each heat)
  - Women's Shortboard: 9th place (3rd place of each heat) and 13th place (4th place of each heat)
  - Men's Longboard: 9th place (3rd place of each heat)
- Eliminated in round 4
  - Men's Shortboard: 9th place (3rd place of each heat)
- Eliminated in semi-finals:
  - Shortboard, Longboard and SUP surf in both genders: 5th place (3rd place of each heat) and 7th place (4th place of each heat)

Non-initiators and non-finishers surfers received zero points. Points awarded according to the position were as follows:

1st place, gold medalist(s)	2nd place, silver medalist(s)	3rd place, bronze medalist(s)	4	5	6	7	8	9	10	11	12	13	14	15	16	17	18	19	20	21	25	33	48
1000	860	730	670	610	583	555	528	500	488	475	462	450	438	425	413	400	395	390	385	380	360	320	240

The first place of the final ranking per teams was declared as the champion team of the 2023 Pan American Surfing Games.

Rank	Team	MS1	MS2	MS3	MS4	WS1	WS2	WS3	WS4	ML1	ML2	WL1	WL2	MSS1	MSS2	WSS1	WSS2	MSR1	MSR2	WSR1	WSR2	Total
1st place, gold medalist(s)	Brazil	1000	555	390	360	1000	400	360	320	730	610	1000	610	860	730	730	610	1000	555	610	0	12430
2nd place, silver medalist(s)	Argentina	730	555	500	240	730	500	320	320	555	500	450	450	555	450	1000	555	730	670	1000	730	11540
3rd place, bronze medalist(s)	Peru	610	500	450	360	610	555	500	240	1000	500	555	500	610	555	860	670	860	425	528	450	11338
4	Canada	860	360	300	240	670	610	400	360	390	360	860	610	1000	670	610	390	528	500	860	400	10978
5	Puerto Rico	360	300	240	240	400	400	400	360	450	360	500	360	555	450	450	450	610	583	670	583	8721
6	Mexico	500	450	450	360	500	400	360	360	390	390	400	400	610	450	450	450	438	0	555	500	8413
7	Panama	670	610	450	240	240	240	240	240	500	500	450	400	450	450	450	450	488	400	488	425	8381
8	Costa Rica	500	450	360	300	500	320	320	320	670	360	730	450	488	390	—	—	462	413	413	395	7841
9	Venezuela	450	360	240	240	360	320	240	240	450	450	400	400	488	390	488	488	450	385	475	385	7699
10	Ecuador	390	360	240	240	450	360	320	320	450	450	400	400	390	—	555	488	—	—	438	—	6251
11	Chile	390	360	360	240	450	450	360	320	610	360	555	—	390	390	—	—	—	—	462	—	5697
12	El Salvador	360	300	300	240	320	320	240	240	555	360	670	—	—	—	555	—	—	—	—	—	4460
13	Uruguay	390	300	240	240	320	320	240	—	860	450	500	—	—	—	—	—	475	—	—	—	4335
14	Guatemala	300	240	240	240	320	240	—	—	390	360	400	—	—	—	—	—	395	390	390	380	4285
15	Colombia	360	300	300	240	555	320	240	—	390	—	500	—	488	450	—	—	—	—	0	—	4143
16	Barbados	390	390	300	300	860	450	—	—	390	360	—	—	—	—	—	—	—	—	—	—	3440
17	Nicaragua	300	240	240	240	400	—	—	—	360	—	—	—	—	—	—	—	—	—	—	—	1780
18	Dominican Republic	240	240	240	240	—	—	—	—	360	360	—	—	—	—	—	—	—	—	—	—	1680
19	United States	144	—	—	—	400	—	—	—	—	—	—	—	—	—	—	—	—	—	—	—	544

Note: "—" Denotes that there were no competitors for that position
