= Orlando Contreras (footballer) =

Peruvian footballer (born 1982)

Personal information
- Full name: Orlando Contreras Collantes
- Date of birth: 11 June 1982 (age 44)
- Place of birth: Pucallpa, Peru
- Height: 1.82 m (6 ft 0 in)
- Positions: Centre-back; sweeper

Team information
- Current team: Cantolao
- Number: 5

Youth career
- 1986–1998: San Agustín
- 1999–2001: Deportivo Municipal

Senior career*
| Years | Team | Apps | (Gls) |
| 2002–2003 | América Cochahuayco | 0 | (0) |
| 2004–2006 | Unión Huaral | 56 | (1) |
| 2006 | FBC Melgar | 21 | (1) |
| 2007–2008 | Universidad San Martín | 72 | (1) |
| 2009 | Alianza Lima | 21 | (1) |
| 2009–2011 | Universidad San Martín | 47 | (0) |
| 2012 | Juan Aurich | 11 | (0) |
| 2013 | Universidad César Vallejo | 38 | (0) |
| 2014 | León de Huánuco | 29 | (0) |
| 2015–2017 | Deportivo Municipal | 33 | (0) |
| 2017– | Cantolao | 1 | (0) |

International career
| 2008–2013 | Peru | 7 | (1) |
- * Club domestic league appearances and goals as of 31 January 2017

Orlando Contreras Collantes (born 11 June 1982) is a Peruvian footballer who plays as a center back for Academia Deportiva Cantolao in the Peruvian First Division.

== Club career ==
Contreras started his career in the youth academy of Universitario de Deportes, playing for their second team América Cochahuayco.

He was already a skilled defender but at that time Universitario de Deportes had great defenders so he never got the opportunity to play for their senior squad.

In 2004, he left América Cochahuayco and to join Unión Huaral.

After his experience at Unión Huaral he went to FBC Melgar. There he was partnered with Pedro Aparicio and Carlos Solis.

In 2007 Contreras joined newly formed Peruvian club Universidad San Martín. There he had the best of seasons in all his career. It was rumoured that he would join several big Peruvian clubs such as Alianza Lima or Sporting Cristal, or possibly a European club. In 2008, he was named Player of the year and Defender of the year by Direct TV.

At the beginning of 2009 Alianza Lima confirmed that they had reached an agreement with Orlando to join them until the end of the season.

== Honours ==
=== Club ===
Universidad San Martín

- Torneo Apertura: 2007
- Torneo Clausura: 2008
- Torneo Descentralizado: 2007, 2008, 2010

=== Individual ===
- Torneo Descentralizado Defender of the Year: 2008
- Torneo Descentralizado Player of the Year: 2008

== Personal life ==
Orlando Contreras' parents are Elena and Orlando Contreras.
