= Daniel Peláez =

Peruvian footballer (born 1985)

Personal information
- Full name: Daniel Peláez Balbuena
- Date of birth: 23 August 1985 (age 41)
- Place of birth: Lima, Peru
- Height: 1.74 m (5 ft 9 in)
- Position: Full back

Team information
- Current team: José Gálvez FBC

Senior career*
Years	Team	Apps	(Gls)
2003–2005	Universitario de Deportes	?	(?)
2006	Unión Huaral	10	(1)
2007	Universidad San Martín	7	(0)
2008	Cienciano	8	(0)
2009	Alianza Atlético	13	(0)
2010	Defensor San José	1	(0)
2011–	José Gálvez FBC	3	(0)
- * Club domestic league appearances and goals as of 7 August 2012

Daniel Peláez Balbuena (born 23 August 1985) is a Peruvian footballer who plays as a left back for José Gálvez FBC.

== Club career ==
Daniel Peláez started his career with Universitario de Deportes, playing there from 2003 to 2005.

Then in 2006 he joined Unión Huaral. There he scored his first league goal of his career in Torneo Descentralizado in a 2–2 home draw against Bolognesi.
