= Antonio Meza-Cuadra =

Peruvian footballer (born 1982)

Personal information
- Full name: Antonio Meza-Cuadra Bisso
- Date of birth: 12 September 1982 (age 44)
- Place of birth: Lima, Peru
- Height: 1.78 m (5 ft 10 in)
- Position: Forward

Youth career
- Universitario

Senior career*
Years	Team	Apps	(Gls)
2001	Virgen de Chapi		(15)
2002	Juan Aurich	24	(5)
2003	Universitario	26	(7)
2004	Unión Huaral	36	(7)
2005	Universidad César Vallejo	41	(7)
2006	Sport Áncash	34	(5)
2007	Universidad San Martín	15	(1)
2008	José Gálvez	48	(17)
2009	Universidad César Vallejo	37	(6)
2010–2013	Melgar	116	(40)
2014	Unión Comercio	35	(11)
2015–2017	Sport Huancayo	72	(36)
2017	Alianza Atlético	13	(2)
2018	Carlos A. Mannucci	16	(5)

International career
- Peru
- * Club domestic league appearances and goals

Antonio Meza-Cuadra Bisso (born 12 September 1982) is a Peruvian professional footballer who played as a forward.

== Club career ==
In January 2010, it was announced that Antonio signed with Arequipa-based side FBC Melgar for the start of the 2010 Descentralizado season. Meza Cuadra made his debut for FBC Melgar in the Peruvian First Division on 14 February 2010, in a home match against Club Juan Aurich. He played the entire 90 minutes, and the match finished in a 1–1 draw. He scored his first official goal in his second league match for Melgar on 20 February 2010, away to Sporting Cristal. His goal was scored in the 62nd minute, but it was not enough as Sporting Cristal won the match 3–1.

Meza Cuadra played one of his best games of the 2011 season in round 29 at home against Alianza Lima, the league leaders at the time. At the time, his club was only one point above the relegation zone with only one round remaining. During the match, Alianza Lima took the lead twice, but then Meza Cuadra managed to score in the 27th minute and cross the ball that led to Christian Ramos' own goal. Despite Melgar having to play with nine players from the 71st minute, his teammate Edson Aubert managed to score the winner in the 84th minute. The match finished in a 3–2 win over Alianza Lima and guaranteed Melgar's place in the Peruvian First Division that season.
