= Aldo Mores =

Argentine footballer

Personal information
- Full name: Aldo Andrés Mores
- Date of birth: 13 January 1982 (age 44)
- Place of birth: Villa Valeria, Córdoba, Argentina
- Height: 1.86 m (6 ft 1 in)
- Position: Defender

Senior career*
Years	Team	Apps	(Gls)
2000–2003	Boca Juniors	3	(0)
2003–2004	Persija Jakarta	22	(1)
2004–2005	Selangor FA	20	(2)
2005–2007	Club Bolívar	35	(3)
2007–2008	Universidad San Martín	16	(0)
2008–2009	Viktoria Žižkov	12	(0)
2009–2010	ViOn Zlaté Moravce	14	(0)
- * Club domestic league appearances and goals as of 9 August 2011

Aldo Andrés Mores (born 13 January 1982) is a former Argentine footballer who last played for ViOn Zlaté Moravce.

He started his senior career at Boca Juniors, and has since played in Indonesia, Malaysia, Bolivia, Peru, the Czech Republic and Slovakia.
