= Pablo Lugüercio =

Argentine footballer

Personal information
- Full name: Pablo Ariel Lugüercio
- Date of birth: 10 March 1982 (age 44)
- Place of birth: La Plata, Argentina
- Height: 1.77 m (5 ft 9 1/2 in)
- Position: Striker

Senior career*
Years	Team	Apps	(Gls)
2001–2008	Estudiantes	90	(15)
2002	→ Defensa y Justicia (loan)	17	(5)
2005	→ USMP (loan)	41	(5)
2008–2011	Racing Club	115	(12)
2012	Barcelona SC	15	(1)
2012–2013	Arsenal de Sarandí	24	(1)
2013–2014	Olimpo	28	(1)
2014–2017	Aldosivi	79	(13)
2017–2019	Estudiantes	18	(2)
- * Club domestic league appearances and goals as of 29 june 2018

Pablo Ariel Lugüercio (born 10 March 1982) is an Argentine former footballer who played as a striker.

== Club career ==
Lugüercio started his career with Estudiantes in the Primera Division in 2001, and then went on loan to Defensa y Justicia of the 2nd division in 2002. In 2005, Lugüercio played to Peruvian club Universidad San Martín de Porres.

Back in Estudiantes, Lugüercio helped Estudiantes win their first league title in 23 years, when he appeared in the 2-1 championship playoff victory against Boca Juniors on December 13, 2006. In the 2007 Clausura tournament, Lugüercio scored six goals coming from the bench. Following the departure of fellow strikers José Luis Calderón and Mariano Pavone, Lugüercio saw more play time in the 2007–08 season.

But, at the end of the season, he was transferred to Racing Club, where he became a starter. In 2012, he moves to Barcelona de Guayaquil, where he has a short stay of only 6 months. By mid 2012 he was loaned to Arsenal de Sarandí, where he played 26 games, scoring only one goal. He signed to play the 2013–2014 season for Olimpo de Bahía Blanca.

Lugüercio is not a traditional forward; he is known for his good touch and tremendous effort. His nickname is payaso ("clown").

In his career, Lugüercio scored 41 goals in 330 games.

== Titles ==
Season	Club	Title
Apertura 2006	Estudiantes	Primera Division Argentina.
