= 2016 Pan American Surf Games =

Pan American Surf Games Peru 2016
- Host city: Miraflores District
- Country: Peru
- Organisers: Pan American Surf Association; Federación Deportiva Nacional de Tabla
- Edition: 12th
- Nations: 12
- Athletes: 260
- Sport: Surfing
- Events: 13 (7 men and 6 women)
- Dates: 2–8 December
- Main venue: Punta Roquitas beach

The 2016 Pan American Surf Games, also referred to as PASA Games 2016 and officially named 2016 Claro Open Pan American Surfing Games for sponsorship reasons, was the twelfth edition of the Pan American Surf Games, the main competition organized by the Pan American Surf Association. It was held at Punta Roquitas beach in Miraflores District, Lima, Peru from 10 to 16 October 2016.

About 260 athletes from 12 national teams competes in 13 surfing events; comprising Open (Shortboard), Longboard, SUP surf, SUP race, Bodyboard prone and Paddleboard race each for men and women, plus a Bodyboard dropknee event only for men.

Defending champions Peru won the competition for the third time with a total of 13,825 points and 9 out of the 13 gold medals at stake. Chile finished second with 11,980 points and 2 gold medals. Ecuador (8,628 points) and Mexico (8,507 points and 1 gold medal) were third and fourth respectively.

== Schedule ==
The games were held over a 7-day period, from 10 to 16 December. The opening ceremony took place on 10 October, with the competitions starting on 11 October.

R1	Round 1	R2	Round 2	R3	Round 3	QF	Quarter-finals	SF	Semi-finals	F	Finals

Event↓/Date →	Tue 11		Wed 12			Thu 13	Fri 14			Sat 15		Sun 16		
Men's Open						R1 (24)	R2 (12)			R3 (6)		QF (3)	SF (2)	F (1)
Men's Bodyboard prone	R1 (12)	R2 (6)	QF (3)	SF (2)	F (1)									
Men's Bodyboard dropknee	R1 (6)		QF (3)	SF (2)	F (1)									
Men's Longboard			QR1 (6)				QF (3)		SF (2)	F (1)				
Men's SUP surf			QF (4)		SF (2)							F (1)		
Men's SUP race										F (1)				
Men's Paddleboard race							F (1)							
Women's Open										R1 (12)	R2 (6)	QF (3)	SF (2)	F (1)
Women's Bodyboard prone							QF (3)	SF (2)	F (1)					
Women's Longboard												QF (3)	SF (2)	F (1)
Women's SUP surf							QF (3)					SF (2)		F (1)
Women's SUP race										F (1)				
Women's Paddleboard race							F (1)							
Heats (Total 149)	24		24			24	28			27		22		

== Participating nations ==
12 out of the 26 national associations affiliated to Pan American Surf Association entered the competition.

- Argentina
- Brazil
- Canada
- Chile
- Costa Rica
- Colombia
- Ecuador
- Mexico
- Peru
- Puerto Rico
- Uruguay (10)
- Venezuela

== Medal table ==
* Host nation (Peru)

Rank	Nation	Gold	Silver	Bronze	Total
1	Peru*	9	3	7	19
2	Chile	2	6	1	9
3	Mexico	1	2	0	3
4	Argentina	1	1	2	4
5	Uruguay	0	1	0	1
6	Costa Rica	0	0	1	1
6	Ecuador	0	0	1	1
6	Puerto Rico	0	0	1	1
Totals (8 entries)		13	13	13	39

== Results ==
=== Men's events ===
Event	Gold		Silver		Bronze		Copper	
Open	Manuel Selman; Chile	16.67 pts	Guillermo Satt; Chile	16.40 pts	Joaquín del Castillo; Peru	15.33 pts	Adrián García; Peru	10.99 pts
Bodyboard prone	Jorge Hurtado; Peru	17.50 pts	Gabriel Brantes; Chile	15.50 pts	Yoshua Toledo; Chile	9.50 pts	Jordan Villalba; Chile	8.67 pts
Bodyboard dropknee	Pancho Galdós; Peru	12.40 pts	Ricardo Sotelo; Peru	8.07 pts	Manuel Rodríguez; Peru	7.00 pts	Pascual Rosales; Ecuador	5.93 pts
Longboard	Piccolo Clemente; Peru	15.73 pts	Julián Schweizer; Uruguay	9.23 pts	Jorge Vílchez; Peru	8.80 pts	Lucas Garrido Lecca; Peru	8.50 pts
SUP surf	José Gómez; Peru	18.30 pts	Renzo Lombardi; Chile	10.67 pts	Gerónimo Roger; Argentina	9.27 pts	Víctor Bazán; Ecuador	5.43 pts
SUP race	Itzel Delgado; Peru	27:56	Julio González; Mexico	28:07	Sebastián Barbero; Argentina	30:47	David Villamar; Ecuador	31:15
Paddleboard race	Sebastián Ríos; Peru	48:10	Nicolas Undurraga; Chile	49:39	Orlando Rufasto; Peru	50:26	Pedro Bermúdez; Peru	55:00

=== Women's events ===
Event	Gold		Silver		Bronze		Copper	
Open	Analí Gómez; Peru	13.43 pts	Daniella Rosas; Peru	10.22 pts	Melanie Giunta; Peru	9.47 pts	Dominic Barona; Ecuador	9.33 pts
Bodyboard prone	Macarena Lecaros; Chile	13.10 pts	Anaís Véliz; Chile	11.67 pts	Carolina Botteri; Peru	8.83 pts	Ángela López; Peru	7.03 pts
Longboard	Mafer Reyes; Peru	13.54 pts	Karen Mendiguetti; Peru	7.34 pts	Marien Blanco; Puerto Rico	6.43 pts	Carolina Thun; Peru	5.10 pts
SUP surf	Karen Jacobson; Mexico	13.00 pts	Natalia de la Lama; Argentina	12.37 pts	Lisette Prado; Ecuador	7.83 pts	Marina Loayza; Peru	5.37 pts
SUP race	Juliana González; Argentina	33:54	Alejandra Brito; Mexico	35:57	Valeria Salustri; Costa Rica	35:58	Angélica Sánchez; Mexico	37:31
Paddleboard race	Rocío Larrañaga; Peru	58:34	Lorena Fica; Chile	59:32	Vania Torres; Peru	1:00:20	Aixa Sánchez; Argentina	1:03:10

=== Final ranking per teams ===
The final ranking per teams was drawn up by adding the individual points earning by the best four surfers in the men's Open event, the best two surfers in the women's Open event and the best surfer in the remaining 11 events. Surfers obtained points according to the final position they occupied in each event.

Non-initiators and non-finishers surfers received zero points. Points awarded according to the position were as follows:

Rank	1st place, gold medalist(s)	2nd place, silver medalist(s)	3rd place, bronze medalist(s)	4	5	6	7	8	9	10	11	12	13	14	15	16	17	18	19	20	21	25	33	37	49	61	73	85
Points	1000	860	730	670	610	583	555	528	500	488	475	462	450	438	425	413	400	395	390	385	380	360	320	300	240	180	144	120

The first place of the final ranking per teams was declared as the champion team of the 2016 Pan American Surf Games.

Rank	Team	MO1	MO2	MO3	MO4	WO1	WO2	MBB1	WBB1	MBD1	ML1	WL1	MSS1	WSS1	MSR1	WSR1	MPR1	WPR1	Total
1st place, gold medalist(s)	Peru	730	670	610	555	1000	860	1000	730	1000	1000	1000	1000	670	1000	0	1000	1000	13,825
2nd place, silver medalist(s)	Chile	1000	860	610	480	610	450	860	1000	610	480	610	860	610	610	610	860	860	11,980
3rd place, bronze medalist(s)	Ecuador	450	360	360	360	670	480	610	480	670	555	480	670	730	670	0	528	555	8,628
4	Mexico	300	240	240	144	450	390	555	555	—	610	610	610	1000	860	860	500	583	8,507
5	Argentina	390	390	240	—	555	450	390	610	450	390	—	730	860	730	1000	610	670	8,465
6	Colombia	360	360	300	240	555	—	390	—	0	450	—	—	555	500	0	—	0	3,710
7	Uruguay	360	240	144	—	480	—	480	0	450	860	480	—	—	—	—	—	—	3,494
8	Puerto Rico	360	240	240	—	450	360	0	—	390	450	730	—	—	—	—	—	—	3,220
9	Costa Rica	300	—	—	—	—	—	0	—	—	450	—	—	—	—	730	—	—	1,480
10	Canada	360	240	—	—	—	—	—	—	—	—	—	—	—	—	—	—	0	600
11	Venezuela	240	144	144	—	—	—	—	—	—	—	—	—	—	—	—	—	—	528
12	Brazil	0	—	—	—	—	—	—	—	—	480	—	—	—	—	—	—	—	480

Note: "—" Denotes that there were no competitors for that position
