= Jorge Reyes (footballer) =

Mexican footballer (born 1991)

Personal information
- Full name: Jorge Reyes Oregón
- Date of birth: January 23, 1991 (age 35)
- Place of birth: Acapulco, Guerrero, Mexico
- Height: 1.74 m (5 ft 9 in)
- Position: Defender

Youth career
- 2007–2011: América

Senior career*
| Years | Team | Apps | (Gls) |
| 2011–2012 | América | 7 | (0) |
| 2013 | → Tiburones Rojos de Veracruz (loan) | 0 | (0) |
| 2013–2014 | → Zacatepec (loan) | 7 | (0) |
| 2014 | Murciélagos F.C. | 4 | (0) |
| 2014–2016 | Reynosa F.C. | 32 | (0) |
| 2015 | → Veracruz (loan) | 0 | (0) |
| 2017 | Athletic Club Morelos | 13 | (1) |
| 2017 | Zacatepec | 0 | (0) |
| 2020 | Acapulco | 0 | (0) |
- * Club domestic league appearances and goals as of 1 July 2013

Jorge Reyes Oregón (born January 23, 1991) is a Mexican former footballer who last played as a defender.

== Club career ==
He was one of the young promising players of América that debuted in the Torneo Apertura 2011. He made his senior team debut on August 13, 2011, as a starter in a match against Tigres UANL in a 2–2 draw at the Estadio Universitario.
