= Manuel Ugaz =

Peruvian footballer (born 1981)

Personal information
- Full name: Manuel Eduardo Tenchi Ugaz Nemotto
- Date of birth: 21 June 1981 (age 45)
- Place of birth: Trujillo, Peru
- Height: 1.83 m (6 ft 0 in)
- Position: Right-back

Senior career*
Years	Team	Apps	(Gls)
2000–2003	Deportivo Coopsol	52	(1)
2004–2007	Universidad San Martín	90	(2)
2008–2011	César Vallejo	118	(4)
2012	Juan Aurich	8	(0)
2013	León de Huánuco	1	(0)
2013	Cienciano	11	(0)
2014	Carlos A. Mannucci	9	(0)
2014	Real Garcilaso	9	(0)
2015–2016	Deportivo Municipal	28	(0)
2017	Ayacucho	15	(0)
2017	Carlos A. Mannucci	13	(0)
2018–2019	Unión Huaral	41	(0)
2020	Deportivo Coopsol	7	(0)
- * Club domestic league appearances and goals

Manuel Eduardo Tenchi Ugaz Nemotto (born 21 June 1981), known as Manuel Ugaz or simply Ugaz, is a Peruvian former professional footballer who played as right-back.

== Career statistics ==
As of 6 March 2017

Appearances and goals by club, season and competition
Club	Season	League			Cup		Conmebol		Other		Total	
Club	Season	Division	Apps	Goals	Apps	Goals	Apps	Goals	Apps	Goals	Apps	Goals
César Vallejo	2009	Peruvian Primera División	29	2	—		—		—		29	2
César Vallejo	2010	Peruvian Primera División	34	1	—		1	0	—		35	1
César Vallejo	2011	Peruvian Primera División	25	0	—		2	0	—		27	0
César Vallejo	Total		88	3	—		3	0	—		91	3
Juan Aurich	2012	Peruvian Primera División	8	0	—		3	0	—		11	0
León de Huánuco	2013	Peruvian Primera División	1	0	—		—		—		1	0
Cienciano	2013	Peruvian Primera División	11	0	—		—		—		11	0
Carlos Mannucci	2014	Peruvian Segunda División	9	0	—		—		—		9	0
Cienciano	2014	Peruvian Primera División	9	0	—		—		—		9	0
Deportivo Municipal	2015	Peruvian Primera División	16	0	2	0	—		—		18	0
Deportivo Municipal	2016	Peruvian Primera División	12	0	—		1	0	—		13	0
Deportivo Municipal	Total		28	0	2	0	1	0	—		31	0
Ayacucho	2017	Peruvian Primera División	5	0	—		—		—		5	0
Career total			159	3	2	0	7	0	—		168	3
