= Ryan Salazar =

Peruvian footballer (born 1982)

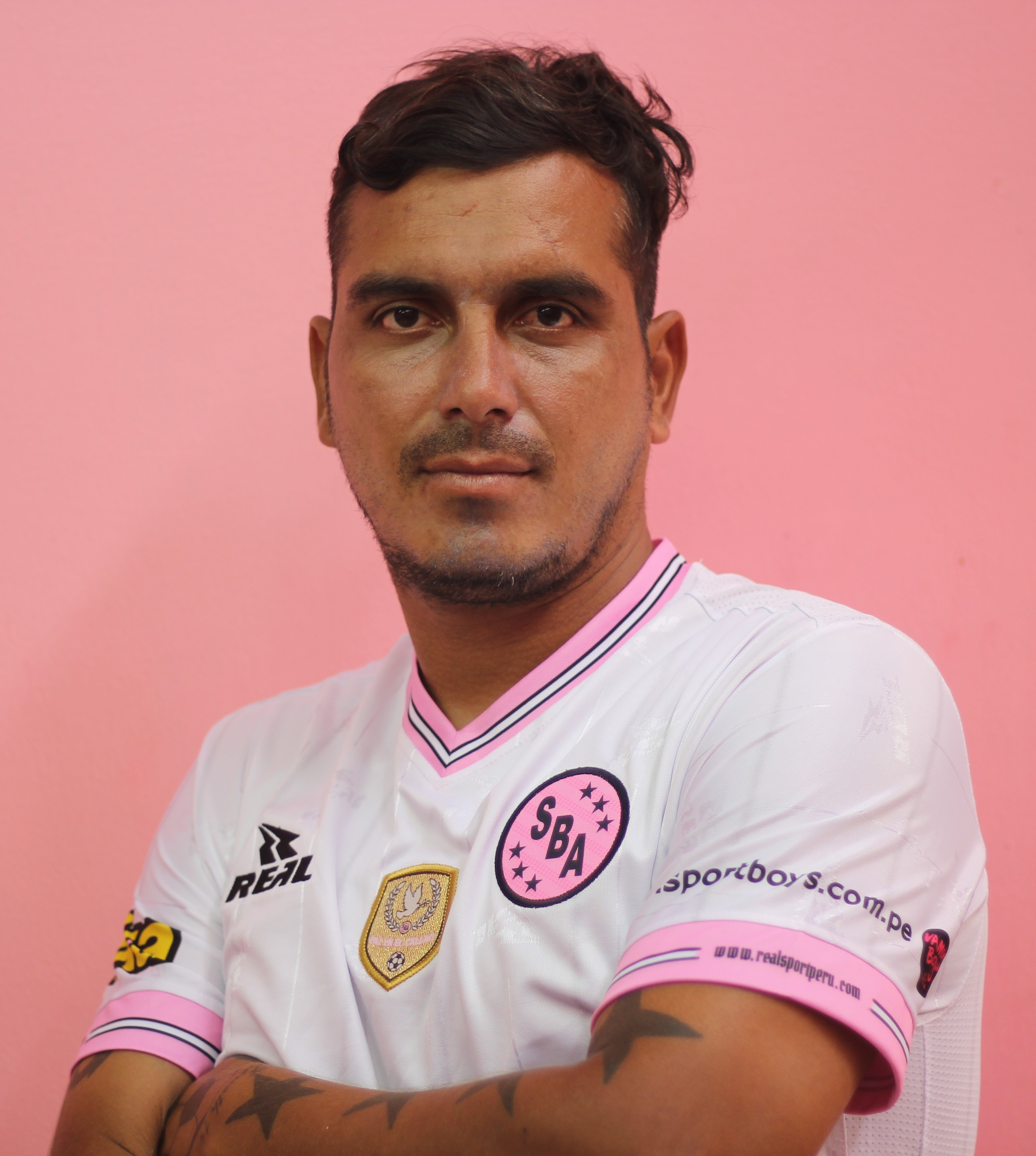

Personal information
- Full name: Ryan Zonath Salazar Rivera
- Date of birth: 25 February 1981 (age 45)
- Place of birth: Lima, Peru
- Height: 1.76 m (5 ft 9 in)
- Position: Midfielder

Team information
- Current team: Unión Huaral
- Number: 14

Youth career
- 1989–1996: Cantolao
- 1997–1999: Alianza Lima

Senior career*
Years	Team	Apps	(Gls)
2000–2002	Alianza Lima	20	(8)
2002	Sport Coopsol Trujillo	7	(0)
2003	Lokomotivi Tbilisi	5	(1)
2003	Atlético Universidad	1	(0)
2004–2005	Unión Huaral	12	(0)
2006–2009	Universidad San Martín	65	(12)
2010	→ Cienciano (loan)	5	(0)
2010	Club Jose Galvez	36	(0)
2011	CN Iquitos	28	(7)
2012–2013	Sport Huancayo	49	(10)
2014	Real Garcilaso	11	(0)
2014	Atlético Minero	29	(2)
2015	UT Cajamarca	23	(10)
2016	Sport Boys	23	(10)
2017	Academia Cantolao	0	(0)
2017–	Unión Huaral	5	(0)
- * Club domestic league appearances and goals as of 25 January 2017

Ryan Zonath Salazar Rivera (born 25 February 1981 in Lima) is a Peruvian footballer who played as a midfielder. He last played for Unión Huaral in the Peruvian Segunda División.

== Honours ==
=== Club ===
- Alianza Lima:
  - Peruvian First Division: 2001
- Universidad San Martín:
  - Peruvian First Division: 2007, 2008
