= John Hinostroza =

Peruvian footballer (born 1980)

Personal information
- Full name: John Christopher Hinostroza Guzmán
- Date of birth: February 22, 1980 (age 46)
- Place of birth: Lima, Peru
- Height: 1.76 m (5 ft 9 in)
- Position: Midfielder

Senior career*
Years	Team	Apps	(Gls)
1999–2000	Alianza Lima	52	(1)
2001	Estudiantes de Medicina	47	(1)
2002	Alianza Lima	15	(0)
2003	Estudiantes de Medicina	33	(2)
2004–2005	Unión Huaral	46	(2)
2005–2011	Universidad San Martín	228	(6)
2012–2014	Universidad César Vallejo	84	(2)
2015–2016	Unión Huaral	24	(4)
Total		529	(18)

International career
1999	Peru	1	(0)
- * Club domestic league appearances and goals as of 17 February 2017

John Christopher Hinostroza Guzmán (born February 22, 1980, in Lima) is a Peruvian footballer who plays as a midfielder.

== Honours ==
=== Club ===
Alianza Lima

- Torneo Clausura: 1999

Universidad San Martín

- Peruvian Primera División: 2007, 2008, 2010

Preceded by ?	Universidad San Martín captains 200?–2011	Succeeded by Leao Butrón
