= Fernando García (footballer) =

Peruvian footballer (born 1987)

Personal information
- Full name: Fernando Rafael García López
- Date of birth: 21 July 1987 (age 39)
- Place of birth: Pimentel District, Peru
- Height: 1.78 m (5 ft 10 in)
- Position: Striker

Team information
- Current team: Alianza Atlético
- Number: 29

Youth career
- 2000–2001: Colegio San Agustín de Chiclayo

Senior career*
Years	Team	Apps	(Gls)
2001–2003	Juan Aurich		
2004–2006	Universidad San Martín		
2007	Alianza Atlético		
2007	Sport Boys		
2008–2010	Juan Aurich	48	(8)
2010	León de Huánuco	3	(1)
2011	Juan Aurich	0	(0)
2011–	Alianza Atlético	6	(1)

International career
2006–2007	Peru U-20	11	(0)
- * Club domestic league appearances and goals as of 24 October 2011

Fernando Rafael García López (born 21 July 1987) is a Peruvian footballer who plays as a striker for Alianza Atlético in the Peruvian First Division.

== Club career ==
García made his professional debut for Juan Aurich in June 2001, aged just 13 (one month before turning 14). This was the world record until Bolivian footballer Mauricio Baldivieso made his debut at age 12. Though according to The Guardian, sources comparing the ages Baldivieso and García are all but verifiable. Fifa lists the, then, 13-year-old Souleymane Mamam as the youngest-ever player in a World Cup qualifying match, supposedly 13 years and 310 days old in May 2001 during a Togo vs Zambia match.

He later played for Universidad San Martín, Alianza Atlético and Sport Boys before returning to Juan Aurich in 2008.

== International career ==
García is former member of the Peru national under-20 football team and presented his team at 2007 South American Youth Championship in Paraguay
