= Mario Leguizamón =

Uruguayan footballer (born 1982)

Personal information
- Full name: Mario Evaristo Leguizamón Martínez
- Date of birth: 7 July 1982 (age 44)
- Place of birth: Montevideo, Uruguay
- Height: 1.76 m (5 ft 9 in)
- Position: Attacking midfielder

Youth career
- Peñarol

Senior career*
Years	Team	Apps	(Gls)
2000–2006	Peñarol	25	(2)
2002–2003	→ Plaza Colonia (loan)	38	(14)
2005	→ Deportivo Colonia (loan)	3	(0)
2006	→ Montevideo Wanderers (loan)	7	(1)
2006–2012	Universidad San Martín	42	(18)
2008–2009	→ Emelec (loan)	4	(0)
2009–2010	→ Deportivo Táchira (loan)	8	(0)
2009	→ Durazno (loan)	14	(4)
2010–2011	→ José Gálvez FBC (loan)	37	(6)
2011	→ Universidad César Vallejo (loan)	21	(5)
2012	→ Rampla Juniors (loan)	6	(0)
2012	Cienciano	8	(0)
2013	Universitario	0	(0)
2013	Atlético Huila	13	(3)
2014	Plaza Colonia	8	(0)
2015	Olimpia	13	(2)
2015–2016	Villa Española	3	(0)
2016	River Plate	5	(0)
2016–2017	Progreso	13	(1)
- * Club domestic league appearances and goals as of 5 December 2017

Mario Evaristo Leguizamón Martínez (born 7 July 1982 in Montevideo) is an Uruguayan football player who last played as an attacking midfielder for C.A. Progreso.
