= Gerardo Morales (footballer) =

Uruguayan footballer (born 1975)

Personal information
- Full name: Gerardo Ariel Morales Santos
- Date of birth: September 20, 1975 (age 51)
- Place of birth: Montevideo, Uruguay
- Height: 1.65 m (5 ft 5 in)
- Position: Midfielder

Senior career*
Years	Team	Apps	(Gls)
1997–2000	Rentistas		
2000–2001	Huracán	17	(2)
2001–2002	Grasshopper	13	(0)
2003	Wil	8	(0)
2003	Montevideo Wanderers		
2003–2004	Maldonado		
2004–2005	Rampla Juniors		
2005–2006	Universidad San Martín		
2006–2007	Nacional		
2007–2008	Mes Kerman	15	(3)
2008–2010	Rentistas		
- * Club domestic league appearances and goals as of 14 April 2008

Gerardo Ariel Morales Santos, more commonly known as Karibito, born September 20, 1975, in Montevideo) is a Uruguayan football midfielder.
