= Ricardo Farro =

Peruvian footballer (born 1985)

Personal information
- Full name: Ricardo Daniel Farro Caballero
- Date of birth: 6 March 1985 (age 41)
- Place of birth: Lima, Peru
- Height: 1.81 m (5 ft 11 in)
- Position: Goalkeeper

Team information
- Current team: FBC Melgar
- Number: 1

Senior career*
Years	Team	Apps	(Gls)
2003–2004	Alianza Lima	1	(0)
2005–2017	Universidad de San Martín	171	(0)
2018	Binacional	9	(0)
2019	Real Garcilaso	6	(0)
2020	Cusco	3	(0)
2021–	Melgar	9	(0)
- * Club domestic league appearances and goals as of 15 September 2024

Ricardo Daniel Farro Caballero (born 6 March 1985) is a Peruvian footballer who plays for Melgar in the Liga 1, as a goalkeeper.

== Career ==
Farro started out his career with Alianza Lima in 2003.

In 2005, he joined newly formed Lima club Universidad San Martín. There he won his first league title winning the 2007 Torneo Descentralizado and the following year 2008 Torneo Descentralizado. He helped his side win their third title by finishing as the 2010 Torneo Descentralizado champions, making 12 league appearances and 2 in the final playoffs that season.

== Honours ==
Universidad San Martín

- Torneo Descentralizado: 2007, 2008, 2010
