= José Luis Chacón =

Peruvian footballer (born 1971)

Personal information
- Full name: José Luis Chacón
- Date of birth: 6 November 1971 (age 54)
- Place of birth: Callao, Peru
- Height: 1.80 m (5 ft 11 in)
- Position: Defender

Senior career*
Years	Team	Apps	(Gls)
1993–1995	Hijos de Yurimaguas		
1996–1998	Deportivo Pesquero	96	(9)
1999–2000	Alianza Lima	65	(1)
2001–2003	Sport Boys	104	(5)
2004	Grau-Estudiantes	19	(1)
2004	Atlético Universidad	24	(2)
2005–2007	Universidad de San Martín	94	(4)
2008	José Gálvez FBC	49	(1)
2009	Total Chalaco	11	(1)
2009	Sport Áncash	6	(0)
2010	Coronel Bolognesi		

International career
1999	Peru	3	(0)
- * Club domestic league appearances and goals as of 22 April 2013

José Luis Chacón (born 6 November 1971 in Callao) is a former Peruvian football defender, who earned three caps for the Peru national football team during his career. He was part of Peru’s squad for the 1999 Copa América. He played for several clubs, including Hijos de Yurimaguas Callao, Deportivo Wanka, Alianza Lima, Sport Boys Callao, Estudiantes de Medicina, Atlético Universidad, Universidad San Martín de Porres, and Club José Gálvez.
