= Hernán Rengifo =

Peruvian footballer (born 1983)

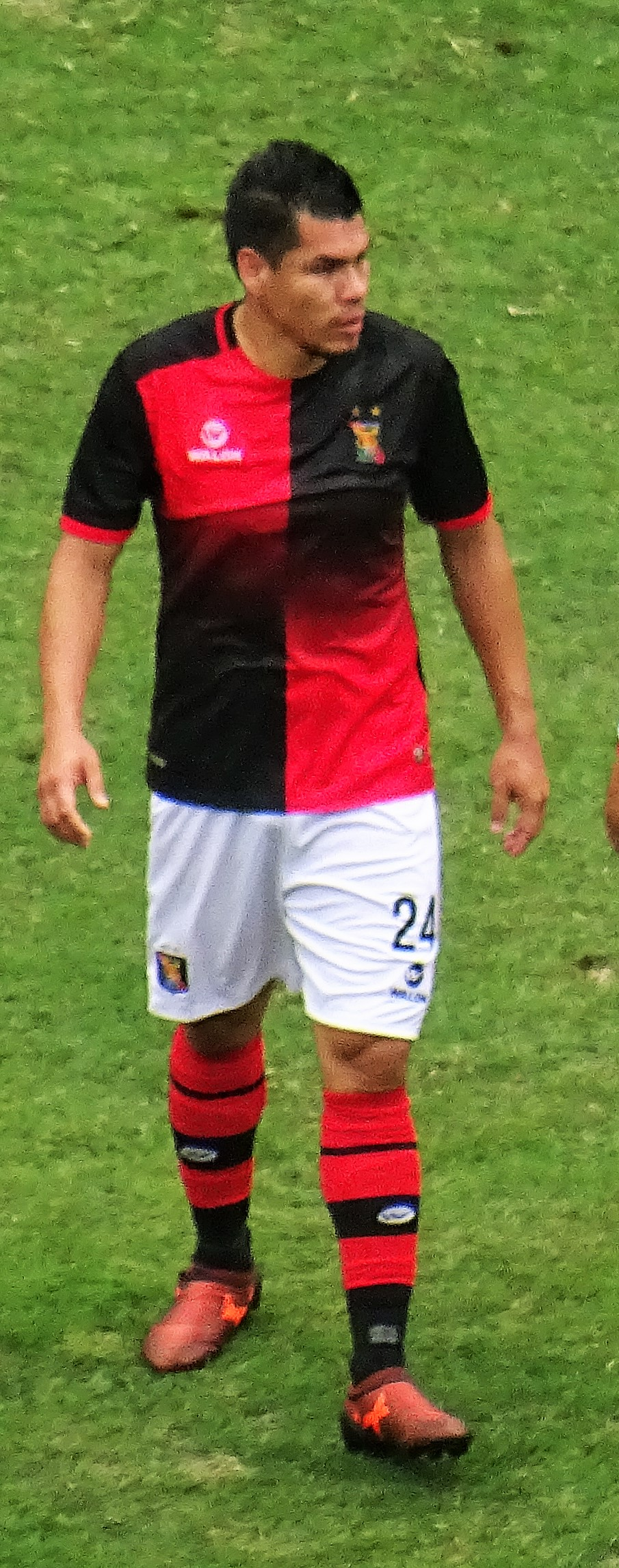
- Rengifo while playing for Melgar in 2018.

Personal information
- Full name: Hernán Rengifo Trigoso
- Date of birth: 18 April 1983 (age 43)
- Place of birth: Chachapoyas, Peru
- Height: 1.83 m (6 ft 0 in)
- Position: Forward

Team information
- Current team: Asociación Deportiva Tarma
- Number: 9

Senior career*
Years	Team	Apps	(Gls)
2000–2001	Virgen de Chapi FC	16	(6)
2002–2003	Universitario	22	(3)
2004	Unión Huaral	41	(16)
2005–2007	Universidad de San Martín	83	(40)
2007–2009	Lech Poznań	56	(24)
2010–2011	Omonia Nicosia	39	(10)
2012	Sporting Cristal	33	(7)
2013	Sivasspor	12	(2)
2014–2015	Juan Aurich	55	(21)
2015–2017	Universitario	49	(16)
2017–2018	Melgar	28	(8)
2018–2019	Real Garcilaso	44	(10)
2020	Alianza Universidad de Huánuco	16	(4)
2021	Carlos Stein	1	(0)
2021	Deportivo Municipal	17	(3)
2022–	Asociación Deportiva Tarma	115	(21)

International career
2005–2012	Peru	23	(6)
- * Club domestic league appearances and goals as of 01 September 2026

Hernán Rengifo Trigoso (born 18 April 1983) is a Peruvian professional footballer who plays as a striker for Peruvian Primera División club Asociación Deportiva Tarma.

== Club career ==
In a successful 2008-09 UEFA Cup campaign with Lech Poznań, Rengifo finished with six goals in the competition, including scoring in both legs of round of 32 tie against Italian Serie A club Udinese Calcio. Rengifo played at Lech along fellow Peruvian, Anderson Cueto.

In January 2010, he was transferred to Omonia in Cyprus. In January 2012, he was released from Omonia and returned to Peru to play for Sporting Cristal.

== International career ==
In March 2009, Rengifo was called up by coach José del Solar for the World Cup 2010 qualifiers with Chile and Brazil. The Peru team at this stage were bottom of the ten-nation qualifying group.

Rengifo was left behind as the national team returned from a match in Colombia on 10 June 2009.

== Personal life ==
He is nicknamed Charapa, which is how the people from the Amazonas basin is informally called in Peru. Literally, Charapa is the name of a turtle. In Poland he was nicknamed Reindeer - (Renifer in Polish).

== Career statistics ==
Scores and results list Peru's goal tally first.

#	Date	Venue	Opponent	Score	Result	Competition
1	30 March 2008	Estadio Max Augustín, Iquitos, Peru	Costa Rica	1–0	3–1	Friendly
2	31 May 2008	Estadio Nuevo Colombino, Huelva, Spain	Spain	1–1	1–2	Friendly
3	9 September 2009	Estadio Monumental "U", Lima, Peru	Uruguay	1–0	1–0	2010 FIFA World Cup qualification
4	10 October 2009	Estadio Monumental Antonio Vespucio Liberti, Buenos Aires, Argentina	Argentina	1–1	1–2	2010 FIFA World Cup qualification
5	18 November 2009	Sun Life Stadium, Miami, United States	Honduras	2–1	2–1	Friendly
6	8 October 2010	Estadio Alejandro Villanueva, Lima, Peru	Costa Rica	2–0	2–0	Friendly
