= José Moisela =

Peruvian footballer (born 1980)

Personal information
- Full name: José Alberto Moisela Huapaya
- Date of birth: June 25, 1980 (age 46)
- Place of birth: Lima, Peru
- Height: 1.70 m (5 ft 7 in)
- Position: Left back

Team information
- Current team: Inti Gas Deportes

Senior career*
Years	Team	Apps	(Gls)
2000	Deportivo Municipal	27	(1)
2001	Coopsol Trujillo	18	(1)
2001–2005	Sporting Cristal	117	(14)
2005	Univ. San Martín	21	(2)
2006	Universitario	13	(0)
2006	Belgrano	3	(0)
2007	Alianza Atlético	37	(1)
2008	Juan Aurich	40	(7)
2009	Alianza Lima	25	(0)
2010	Total Chalaco	24	(1)
2011–	Inti Gas	10	(1)

International career
2003	Peru	1	(0)
- * Club domestic league appearances and goals as of 22 November 2011

José Alberto Moisela Huapaya (born June 25, 1980, in Lima, Peru) is a Peruvian footballer who plays as a left back. He currently plays for Inti Gas Deportes in the Peruvian First Division.

== Career ==
Moisela has played most of his career in Peru for a selection of different clubs. In 2006, he had a short spell in Argentina with Belgrano, but he only played three games for the club before returning to Peru.
