= Punta Negra District =

District in Lima, Peru

Coordinates: 12°22′05″S 76°47′50″W

Punta Negra
- District
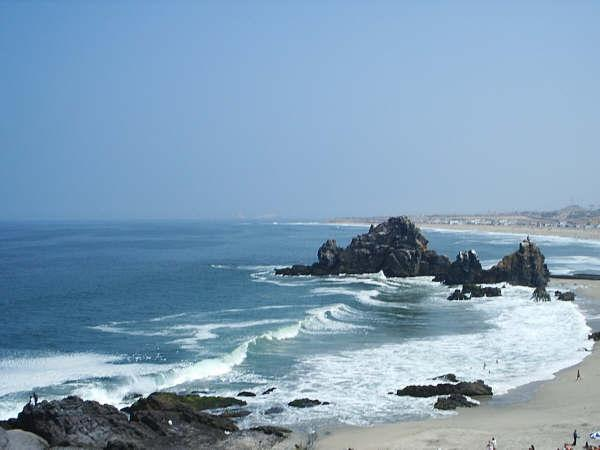
- La Bikini beach, view from El Chanque.

- Coat of arms

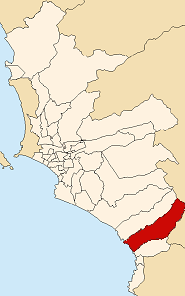
- Location of Punta Negra in the Lima province
- Country: Peru
- Province: Lima
- Founded: 7 April 1954
- Capital: Punta Negra

Government
  - Mayor: Eulogio Huyhua (2023–2026)

Area
  - Total: 130.5 km^{2} (50.4 sq mi)

Population (2023)
  - Total: 8,914
  - Density: 68.31/km^{2} (176.9/sq mi)
- Time zone: UTC-5 (PET)
- UBIGEO: 150127
- Website: munipuntanegra.gob.pe

Punta Negra is one of the 43 districts of the Province of Lima. It borders the district of Punta Hermosa to the north, the Province of Huarochirí to the east, the district of San Bartolo to the south, and the Pacific Ocean to the west.

== History ==
In pre-columbian times, the area of the current district was inhabited by coastal fishermen of the Yungas people, and was under the hegemony of the rulers of Pachacamac, and later the Incas. Post-conquest, the area was known as Tropezon, until passage of the Law Nº 12096 created the modern district of Punta Negra on 7 April 1954. Its name is attributed to an Italo-Peruvian citizen named Lidio Mongilardi, who upon visiting the area for the first time reportedly compared it to a coastal zone in Italy known as Punta Negra. As a popular beach destination, various Peruvian social clubs have beach venues in this district. In 2019, Punta Rocas was one of the venues of the 2019 Pan American Games.

== Geography ==
The district has an area of 130.5 km^{2}, most of which is uninhabited desert. It is estimated to have more than 8,000 permanent residents, and 11,000 during the summer beach season. The district has several beaches, including Cangrejos, Punta Rocas, El Puerto, La Pocita, La Bikini, El Revés, Santa Rosa and Peñascal. A highlight is the Quebrada de Cruz de Hueso, whose mouth can be found on Peñascal beach.

== Government ==
The municipal council is responsible for taxes and regulations, and includes a mayor and local councilors

=== Local politicians ===
- Current District Government (in May 2023)
  - Elogio Huyhua Ccaccya - District Mayor
  - Eudocio Parco Javier - District Alderman
  - Nanci Maura Lopez Vda de Suyo - District Alderman
  - Guillermo Eduardo Saco Vertiz Schwarz - District Alderman
  - Felicita Alejandrina Carrasco Villafuerte - District Alderman
  - Olga Angela Orbegoso Cavero - District Alderman

== Religious organization ==
- Parish
  - Parish Priest: Padre Félix.

== Festividades ==
- Club Punta Negra:
  - January: New Year's Celebration
  - February: Kermesse, Luau Party
  - March: Carnival
  - December: Start of Season Lunch
- March: Feast of Saint Joseph
- June: Feast of Saint Peter.

== See also ==
- Cono Sur
- Punta Hermosa
- San Bartolo
- Santa María del Mar
- Ancón
- Santa Rosa
- Asia
