= 2009 CD Universidad San Martín season =

Universidad San Martín de Porres
2009 season
- Chairman: Universidad San Martín de Porres
- Manager: Víctor Rivera 3 set. Gustavo Matosas (Uruguay)
- Primera División Peruana 2009: Full Table: 4° *Regular Season: 6° *Liguilla: 2°
- Copa Libertadores: Second round

The 2009 season is the 6th season of competitive football by Universidad San Martín de Porres.

== Statistics ==
=== Appearances and goals ===
Number	Position	Name	Copa Libertadores		Liguilla "B"		Regular Season		Total	
Number	Position	Name	Apps	Goals	Apps	Goals	Apps	Goals	Apps	Goals
1	GK	(Peru) Leao Butrón	8 (0)	0	13 (0)	0	19 (0)	0	40 (0)	0
2	DF	(Peru) Jorge Huamán	4 (1)	0	9 (1)	0	13 (0)	1	26 (2)	1
3	DF	(Peru) Christian Ramos	7 (0)	0	11 (1)	0	21 (1)	1	39 (2)	1
4	DF	(Peru) Jorge Reyes	5 (0)	0	8 (0)	0	15 (1)	1	28 (1)	1
5	DF	(Peru) Adan Balbín	1 (0)	0	0 (0)	0	1 (0)	0	2 (0)	0
6	MF	(Peru) John Hinostroza	8 (0)	0	14 (0)	1	19 (0)	0	41 (0)	1
7	DF	(Peru) Aurelio Saco-Vértiz	0 (0)	0	0 (0)	0	3 (0)	0	3 (0)	0
8	MF	(Peru) Christian Cueva	0 (0)	0	9 (1)	3	5 (2)	0	14 (3)	3
9	FW	(Colombia) Martín Arzuaga	8 (0)	3	0 (0)	0	19 (1)	12	27 (1)	15
10	MF	(Argentina) José Luis Díaz	6 (0)	1	7 (2)	1	17 (0)	4	30 (2)	6
11	FW	(Paraguay) Carlos Pérez	0 (5)	0	0 (0)	0	4 (4)	2	4 (9)	2
12	GK	(Peru) Marcos Flores	0 (0)	0	1 (0)	0	11 (1)	0	12 (1)	0
13	DF	(Peru) Atilio Muente	1 (0)	0	9 (0)	1	18 (2)	0	28 (2)	1
14	MF	(Peru) Josepmir Ballón	5 (3)	0	13 (0)	0	28 (0)	1	46 (3)	1
15	DF	(Peru) Guillermo Guizasola	7 (0)	0	11 (0)	0	18 (0)	0	36 (0)	0
16	FW	(Peru) Pedro García	7 (1)	1	8 (3)	3	12 (9)	4	27 (13)	8
17	FW	(Peru) Orlando Allende	0 (3)	0	0 (3)	0	3 (4)	0	3 (10)	0
18	MF	(Peru) Fernando Del Solar	0 (2)	0	1 (3)	0	4 (13)	2	5 (18)	2
19	MF	(Peru) Carlos Fernández	4 (0)	0	3 (4)	0	10 (9)	2	17 (13)	2
20	DF	(Peru) Guillermo Salas	5 (1)	0	4 (1)	0	20 (0)	0	29 (2)	0
21	GK	(Peru) Ricardo Farro	0 (0)	0	0 (0)	0	0 (0)	0	0 (0)	0
22	MF	(Argentina) Gonzalo Ludueña	6 (0)	2	8 (5)	4	19 (4)	6	33 (9)	12
23	MF	(Peru) Ronald Quinteros	2 (3)	0	5 (4)	1	9 (3)	1	16 (10)	2
24	FW	(Peru) Luis Gabriel García	0 (1)	0	0 (2)	0	4 (5)	0	4 (7)	0
25	MF	(Peru) Wilmer Carrillo	3 (2)	0	0 (1)	0	12 (3)	1	15 (6)	1
5	DF	(Peru) José Honores	0 (0)	0	0 (0)	0	2 (0)	0	2 (0)	0
7	MF	(Argentina) Mauro Cejas	1 (0)	0	0 (0)	0	4 (1)	1	5 (1)	1
23	FW	(Peru) Roberto Silva	0 (1)	0	5 (5)	0	11 (9)	3	16 (15)	3
14	MF	(Peru) Ryan Salazar	0 (0)	0	0 (1)	0	2 (7)	3	2 (8)	3
8	FW	(Peru) Andrés Rivera	0 (0)	0	0 (0)	0	3 (1)	0	3 (1)	0
28	MF	(Peru) Mauricio Rebaza	0 (0)	0	0 (0)	0	3 (1)	0	3 (1)	0
27	FW	(Peru) Luis Álvarez	0 (0)	0	0 (0)	0	0 (1)	0	0 (1)	0
27	DF	(Peru) Antony Molina	0 (0)	0	3 (1)	0	1 (1)	0	4 (2)	0
	GK	(Peru) Pedro Gallese	0 (0)	0	0 (0)	0	0 (0)	0	0 (0)	0
	DF	(Peru) Junior Huerta	0 (0)	0	0 (0)	0	0 (0)	0	0 (0)	0
11	FW	(Argentina) Germán Alemanno	0 (0)	0	11 (1)	5	0 (0)	0	11 (1)	5
9	FW	(Peru) Jairzinho Baylón	0 (0)	0	1 (2)	0	0 (0)	0	1 (2)	0

=== Competition Overload ===
Club World Cup	Recopa	Libertadores	Sudamericana	Primera División	Liguilla	Regular Season
		Second Stage		5th	3rd	6th

== Copa Libertadores 2009 ==
=== Group stage ===
Date	Opponent team	Home/Away	Score	Scorers
12 February 2009	(Uruguay) Nacional	A	1 – 2	Arzuaga 39'
5 March 2009	(Argentina) River Plate	H	2 – 1	Díaz 39' (pen.), Ludueña 55'
12 March 2009	(Paraguay) Nacional	H	2 – 1	Pedro García 53', 58'
7 April 2009	(Paraguay) Nacional	A	1 – 1	Arzuaga 41'
21 April 2009	(Uruguay) Nacional	H	1 – 1	Ludueña 88'
30 April 2009	(Argentina) River Plate	A	0 – 3	

Team	Pld	W	D	L	GF	GA	GD	Pts	
(Uruguay) Nacional	6	4	2	0	12	3	+9	14	+
(Peru) U. San Martín	6	2	2	2	7	9	−2	8	+
(Argentina) River Plate	6	2	1	3	7	9	−2	7	-
(Paraguay) Nacional	6	1	1	4	7	12	−5	4	–

=== Knockout stage ===
Date	Opponent team	Home/Away	Score	Scorers
6 May 2009	(Brazil) Grêmio	H	1 – 3	Arzuaga 34'
13 May 2009	(Brazil) Grêmio	A	0 – 2	

== Primera División Peruana 2009 ==
=== Regular season ===
Date	Opponent team	Home/Away	Score	Scorers
15 February 2009	U. César Vallejo	H	1 – 1	Ludueña 62'
22 February 2009	Sport Huancayo	A	1 – 1	Del Solar 11'
28 February 2009	Coronel Bolognesi	H	3 – 1	Arzuaga 27', Fernández 27'. Quinteros 62'
7 March 2009	Juan Aurich	A	0 – 1	
15 March 2009	F.B.C. Melgar	H	3 – 1	Arzuaga 66', Díaz 66', Ludueña 90' + 2'
22 March 2009	José Gálvez FBC	A	2 – 0	Ludueña 17', 89'
15 April 2009	Alianza Lima	H	1 – 1	Arzuaga 66'
12 April 2009	Sport Ancash	A	1 – 1	Salazar 10'
24 June 2009	Universitario	H	0 – 1	
25 April 2009	Sporting Cristal	A	4 – 3	Arzuaga 44'. 65'. 67', Ludueña 47'
3 May 2009	Inti Gas	H	1 – 2	Fernández 28'
9 May 2009	Total Chalaco	A	2 – 4	Pérez 56', Huamán 76'
1 July 2009	Cienciano	H	2 – 1	Silva 43', Pedro García 82'
17 May 2009	Alianza Atlético	H	3 – 2	Pérez 9', Díaz 46', Del Solar 76'
24 May 2009	Colegio Nacional de Iquitos	A	2 – 0	Arzuaga 9', 32'
30 May 2009	U. César Vallejo	A	1 – 1	Carrillo 55'
14 June 2009	Sport Huancayo	H	1 – 1	Pedro García 9'
20 June 2009	Coronel Bolognesi	A	4 – 1	Díaz 1', Arzuaga 20', Ludueña 66', Salazar 89'
28 June 2009	Juan Aurich	H	4 – 1	Díaz 22', Ludueña 47', Silva 48' Salazar 83'
4 July 2009	F.B.C. Melgar	A	0 – 1	
11 July 2009	José Gálvez FBC	H	1 – 1	Arzuaga 39'
19 July 2009	Alianza Lima	A	1 – 0	Ramos 80'
25 July 2009	Sport Ancash	H	2 – 1	Arzuaga 53', 73'
29 July 2009	Universitario	A	0 – 1	
1 August 2009	Sporting Cristal	H	2 – 2	Pedro García 51', 60'
8 August 2009	Inti Gas Deportes	A	1 – 1	Ballón 90'
15 August 2009	Total Chalaco	H	2 – 0	Pedro García 29', Silva 85'
26 August 2009	Cienciano	A	1 – 1	Pedro García 55'
23 August 2009	Alianza Atlético	A	0 – 0	
29 August 2009	Colegio Nacional de Iquitos	H	0 – 0	

=== Liguilla Final – Group B ===
Date	Opponent team	Home/Away	Score	Scorers
13 September 2009	Total Chalaco	A	2 – 2	Alemanno 2', Ludueña 52'
16 September 2009	F.B.C. Melgar	H	2 – 2	Quinteros 28', Alemanno 58'
20 September 2009	Universitario	A	0 – 0	
27 September 2009	Sport Huancayo	H	1 – 2	Hinostroza 8'
3 October 2009	Coronel Bolognesi	A	2 – 1	Muente 73', Díaz 74'
18 October 2009	Cienciano	H	5 – 0	Alemanno 9', 29', 34', Cueva 48', García 83'
25 October 2009	Alianza Atlético	A	1 – 2	García 18'
31 October 2009	Total Chalaco	H	1 – 0	Ludueña 83'
4 November 2009	F.B.C. Melgar	A	1 – 0	Cueva 69'
25 November 2009	Universitario	H	1 – 0	Ludueña 51'
14 November 2009	Sport Huancayo	A	0 – 1	
21 November 2009	Coronel Bolognesi	H	2 – 1	Ludueña 38', García 90' + 3'
29 November 2009	Cienciano	A	1 – 1	Cueva 37'
6 December 2009	Alianza Atlético	H	0 – 2	

== Preseason friendlies ==
Date	Opponent team	Home/Away	Score	Scorers
19 January 2009	(Ecuador) Emelec	A	1 – 1 (2 – 3p)	Ludueña 44'
22 January 2009	(Ecuador) Deportivo Quito	A	3 – 3 (6 – 5p)	Ludueña 27', Del Solar 66', Pedro García 81'
24 January 2009	(Paraguay) Club Libertad	N	1 – 2	Díaz 86'
26 January 2009	(Uruguay) Defensor Sporting	N	2 – 0	Díaz 45', García 71'
28 January 2009	(Argentina) Club Atlético Huracán	A	2 – 2	García, Arzuaga
7 February 2009	(Peru) Colegio Nacional de Iquitos	A	0 – 0	

== Transfers ==
=== In ===
Pos	Player	From
DF	(Peru) Adán Balbín	(Peru) Coronel Bolognesi
DF	(Peru) Orlando Allende	(Peru) Sport Áncash
MF	(Peru) Carlos Fernández	(Peru) Alianza Lima
DF	(Peru) Christian Ramos	(Peru) Sporting Cristal
FW	(Argentina) Gonzalo Ludueña	(Ecuador) Emelec
FW	(Peru) Luis García	(Argentina) Estudiantes de la Plata
FW	(Colombia) Martín Arzuaga	(Colombia) Atlético Junior
MF	(Argentina) Mauro Cejas	(Mexico) C.F. Monterrey
FW	(Argentina) Germán Alemanno	(Argentina) Rosario Central

=== Out ===
Pos	Player	To
DF	(Peru) Orlando Contreras	(Peru) Alianza Lima
FW	(Paraguay) Roberto Ovelar	(Mexico) Cruz Azul
MF	(Peru) Edwin Pérez	(Peru) Sporting Cristal
FW	(Peru) Manuel Barreto	(Peru) José Gálvez FBC
MF	(Peru) Erick Coavoy	(Peru) Colegio Nacional de Iquitos
MF	(Peru) Junior Huerta	(Peru) Colegio Nacional de Iquitos
MF	(Peru) Luis Álvarez	(Peru) Atlético Minero
GK	(Peru) Pedro Gallese	(Peru) Atlético Minero
DF	(Argentina) Bruno Bianchi	(Chile) Palestino
	(Peru) Sebastian Árias	
MF	(Argentina) Mauro Cejas	(Mexico) Estudiantes Tecos
FW	(Colombia) Martín Arzuaga	(Peru) Juan Aurich
