= 2008 CD Universidad San Martín season =

Universidad San Martín de Porres
2008 season
- Chairman: Universidad San Martín de Porres
- Manager: Víctor Rivera
- Primera División Peruana 2008: Full Table: Champion; *Apertura: 3° *Clausura: Champion
- Copa Libertadores: Group Stage

The 2008 season was the 5th season of competitive football by Universidad San Martín de Porres.

== Statistics ==
=== Appearances and goals ===
Last updated in January 2008.

Number	Position	Name	Copa Libertadores		Torneo Apertura		Torneo Clausura		Total	
Number	Position	Name	Apps	Goals	Apps	Goals	Apps	Goals	Apps	Goals
1	GK	(Peru) Leao Butrón	6 (0)	0	-	-	-	-	-	-
2	DF	(Peru) Jorge Huamán	5 (0)	0	-	-	-	-	-	-
3	DF	(Argentina) Bruno Bianchi	5 (1)	0	-	-	-	-	-	-
4	DF	(Peru) Jorge Reyes	1 (0)	0	-	-	-	-	-	-
5	DF	(Peru) Orlando Conteras	6 (0)	0	-	-	-	-	-	-
6	MF	(Peru) John Hinostroza	5 (0)	0	-	-	-	-	-	-
7	GK	(Brazil) Ricardo Andrade Silva	0 (0)	0	-	-	-	-	-	-
8	MF	(Argentina) José Luis Díaz	2 (3)	1	-	-	-	-	-	-
9	FW	(Paraguay) Roberto Ovelar	4 (0)	1	-	-	-	-	-	-
10	MF	(Uruguay) Mario Leguizamón	5 (0)	1	-	-	-	-	-	-
11	FW	(Peru) Alexander Sánchez	4 (2)	0	-	-	-	-	-	-
12	GK	(Peru) Marcos Flores	0 (0)	0	-	-	-	-	-	-
13	DF	(Peru) Atilio Muente	0 (0)	0	-	-	-	-	-	-
14	MF	(Peru) Ryan Salazar	0 (1)	0	-	-	-	-	-	-
15	DF	(Peru) Guillermo Guizasola	0 (0)	0	-	-	-	-	-	-
16	FW	(Peru) Pedro García	3 (2)	0	-	-	-	-	-	-
17	MF	(Peru) Josepmir Ballón	0 (1)	0	-	-	-	-	-	-
18	MF	(Peru) Fernando Del Solar	3 (1)	0	-	-	-	-	-	-
19	MF	(Peru) Edwin Pérez	6 (0)	0	-	-	-	-	-	-
20	DF	(Peru) Guillermo Salas	6 (0)	0	-	-	-	-	-	-
21	GK	(Peru) Ricardo Farro	0 (0)	0	-	-	-	-	-	-
22	MF	(Peru) Jair Céspedes	1 (3)	0	-	-	-	-	-	-
23	MF	(Peru) Ronald Quinteros	0 (1)	0	-	-	-	-	-	-
24	FW	(Peru) Roberto Silva	3 (2)	1	-	-	-	-	-	-
25	MF	(Peru) Wilmer Carrillo	1 (0)	0	-	-	-	-	-	-

=== Competition Overload ===
Club World Cup	Recopa	Libertadores	Sudamericana	Primera División	Apertura	Clausura
		First Stage		Champion: Second title	Champion: Second title	3rd

== Copa Libertadores 2008 ==
=== Group stage ===
Date	Opponent team	Home/Away	Score	Scorers
13 February 2008	(Argentina) River Plate	H	2 – 0	Ovelar 14', Díaz 90' + 1'
26 February 2008	(Chile) Universidad Católica	H	0 – 1	
13 March 2008	(Mexico) Club América	A	1 – 3	Silva 7'
26 March 2008	(Mexico) Club América	H	1 – 0	Leguizamón 36'
1 April 2008	(Chile) Universidad Católica	A	0 – 1	
17 April 2008	(Argentina) River Plate	A	0 – 5	

Team	Pld	W	D	L	GF	GA	GD	Pts	
(Argentina) River Plate	6	4	0	2	14	8	+6	12	+
(Mexico) América	6	3	0	3	10	10	0	9	+
(Chile) U. Católica	6	3	0	3	6	6	0	9	-
(Peru) U. San Martín	6	2	0	4	4	10	-6	6	-

== Pre-season friendlies ==
Date	Opponent team	Home/Away	Score	Scorers
2 February 2008	(Paraguay) Tacuary	N	1 – 0	Leguizamón 17'
4 February 2008	(Uruguay) Nacional	A	1 – 1 (2 – 4p)	Céspedes 86'
