= Club Deportivo Universidad de San Martín de Porres =

Peruvian football club

Universidad de San Martín
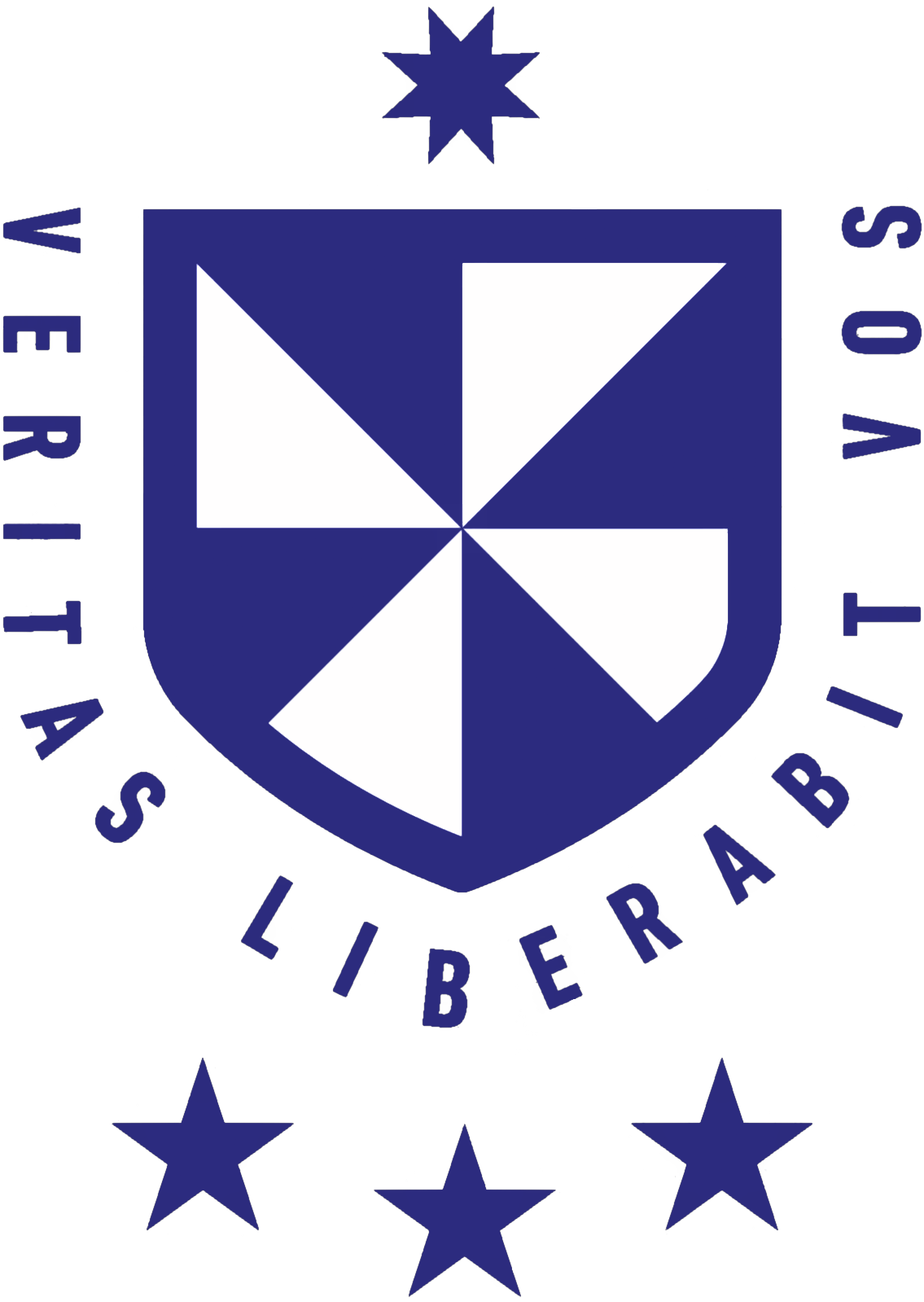
- Full name: Club Deportivo Universidad de San Martín de Porres S.A.
- Nicknames: USMP; Los Santos (The Saints); Los Albos (The Whites)
- Founded: 2004
- Stadium: Estadio Miguel Grau
- President: Raúl Bao García
- Manager: Víctor Rivera
- League: Liga 2
- 2023: Liga 2, 7th
- Website: clubdeportivo.usmp.edu.pe
Home colours	Away colours

Club Deportivo Universidad de San Martín de Porres S.A., commonly known as Club Deportivo USMP, is a Peruvian football club based in the city of Lima. The club was founded in 2004 as a Joint-stock company, the first in Peru. In just their first season, the club began playing in the Peruvian top-flight, the Torneo Descentralizado, after they bought the promotional place of the 2003 Segunda División winners, Sport Coopsol. The team obtained their first Descentralizado title in 2007, the second in 2008 and their third in 2010.

The name comes from the University of San Martín de Porres, a university in Lima.

== History ==
In the 2004 Apertura, Universidad San Martin's results were poor. They accumulated 10 points and were positioned last on the table. Although the club managed to win 47 points and reached second place in the Clausura. In total, San Martin was placed 12th with 57 points. On the relegation table they placed eleventh, remaining in the first division. The following season, they did better and placed fourth, qualifying for the 2006 Copa Sudamericana. Although they were eliminated in the preliminary round, they won their first international game by defeating Bolognesi in a home game 3–2 but were eliminated because of the away goals rule. In 2006, they placed 6th on the aggregate table and did not qualify for any international tournament.

The beginning of the 2007 season smiled upon the "Santos". They won the Apertura for the first time after defeating Cienciano 2–1 in Cuzco, qualifying for the 2008 Copa Libertadores. Despite not finishing in the top 6 places in the Clausura tournament, thereby not fulfilling the condition to qualify for the national title playoff, the Clausura winners Coronel Bolognesi had not satisfied the condition in the Apertura either, so no playoff was played and San Martín were awarded the national title on the basis of its better aggregate record throughout the season.

In the 2009 Copa Libertadores, San Martin became the first Peruvian team to pass the group stage since 2004, eliminating River Plate of Argentina, Nacional of Paraguay, Nacional of Uruguay, and would lose in the round of 16 to Grêmio of Brazil 1–5 on aggregate.

On 12 December 2010, at Estadio Monumental, Universidad San Martin defeated León de Huánuco in Peru's two-legged final that gave Universidad San Martín the domestic championship.

On 20 February 2012, the club Universidad San Martín, for extra-sporting issues, announced their definitive retirement from the local tournament and professional football.

On 14 March 2012, the club Universidad San Martín returned to the local tournament and professional football.

== Colours and badge ==
Universidad San Martín's badge, 2004–2022

== Stadium ==
U. San Martin currently do not own a stadium. Therefore, they play in the different stadiums of Lima. They have used the Estadio Nacional and Estadio Alejandro Villanueva in the past. Today they choose the Estadio Miguel Grau which it shares with Sport Boys and Academia Cantolao. San Martin, however, are known to favor Universitario's stadium, Estadio Monumental "U". The stadium they choose mostly depends on how many people are expected to attend a game.

== Honours ==
=== Senior titles ===
Keys

- Record
- ^{(s)} Shared record

Type	Competition	Titles	Runner-up	Winning years	Runner-up years
National (League)	Primera División	3	—	2007, 2008, 2010	—
Half-year / Short tournament (League)	Torneo Apertura	1	1	2007	2021
Half-year / Short tournament (League)	Torneo Clausura	1	2	2008	2004, 2005
National (Cups)	Copa Inca	—	1	—	2014

=== Youth ===
Type	Competition	Titles	Runner-up	Winning years	Runner-up years
National (League)	Torneo de Promoción y Reservas	2	2	2013, 2015–III	2010, 2012
Half-year / Short tournament (League)	Torneo Clausura (Reservas)	1	—	2015	—
Half-year / Short tournament (League)	Copa Modelo Centenario	—	1	—	2016
Half-year / Short tournament (League)	Torneo de Verano (Reservas)	—	1	—	2018

=== Friendlies ===
Type	Competition	Titles	Runner-up	Winning years	Runner-up years
International (Cup)	Copa Ciudad de Trujillo	1	—	2010	—

== Statistics and results ==
=== League history ===
Season	Div.	Pos.	Pl.	W	D	L	GS	GA	P	South America		Notes
2004	1st	12	52	14	9	27	61	76	57	—		14/14 Torneo Apertura, 2/14 Torneo Clausura
2005	1st	4	48	22	13	13	68	46	79	—		7/13 Torneo Apertura, 2/13 Torneo Clausura
2006	1st	6	44	19	10	15	54	51	67	CS	Chile/Peru Preliminary	5/12 Torneo Apertura, 5/12 Torneo Clausura
2007	1st	1	44	20	11	13	69	45	71	—		1/12 Torneo Apertura, 7/12 Torneo Clausura
2008	1st	1	52	26	16	10	81	42	94	CL	Group Stage	3/14 Torneo Apertura, 1/14 Torneo Clausura
2009	1st	5	44	18	16	10	65	46	69	CL	Round of 16	6/16 Regular Season, 3/8 Liguilla "B"
2010	1st	1	46	29	8	9	90	41	95	CS	Second Round	1/16 Regular Season, 1/8 Liguilla "A"
2011	1st	4	30	13	8	9	43	24	47	CL	Group Stage	4/16 Regular Season
2012	1st	8	44	16	12	16	49	52	61	CS	First Stage	3/16 Regular Season, 4/8 Liguilla "A"
2013	1st	13	44	12	11	21	46	60	49	—		14/16 Regular Season, 7/8 Liguilla "B"
2014	1st	12	30	9	8	13	21	23	35	—		7/16 Torneo Apertura, 15/16 Torneo Clausura
2015	1st	11	32	10	7	15	31	40	38	—		17/17 Torneo Apertura, 7/17 Torneo Clausura
2016	1st	11	44	15	10	19	61	72	55	—		15/16 Torneo Apertura, 15/16 Torneo Clausura 5/8 Liguilla "B"
2017	1st	11	44	14	8	22	63	74	50	–		10/16 Torneo Apertura, 14/16 Torneo Clausura 6/8 Liguilla "A"
2018	1st	11	44	12	18	14	60	61	54	-		14/16 Torneo Apertura, 7/16 Torneo Clausura 4/8 Torneo de Verano

=== CONMEBOL competitions ===
Copa Libertadores
Year	Round	H/A	Score	Result	Scorers
2008	Group 5	H	(Peru) USMP 2 – 0 River Plate (Argentina)	Won	Ovelar 14'; Díaz 91'
2008	Group 5	H	(Peru) USMP 0 – 1 U. Católica (Chile)	Lost	
2008	Group 5	A	(Peru) USMP 1 – 3 America (Mexico)	Lost	Silva 6'
2008	Group 5	H	(Peru) USMP 1 – 0 America (Mexico)	Won	Leguizamón 36'
2008	Group 5	A	(Peru) USMP 0 – 1 U. Católica (Chile)	Lost	
2008	Group 5	A	(Peru) USMP 0 – 5 River Plate (Argentina)	Lost	
2009	Group 3	A	(Peru) USMP 1 – 2 Nacional (Uruguay)	Lost	Arzuaga 39'
2009	Group 3	H	(Peru) USMP 2 – 1 River Plate (Argentina)	Won	Díaz 37' (pen.); Ludueña 55'
2009	Group 3	H	(Peru) USMP 2 – 1 Nacional (Paraguay)	Won	García 53' 58'
2009	Group 3	A	(Peru) USMP 1 – 1 Nacional (Paraguay)	Draw	Arzuaga 41'
2009	Group 3	H	(Peru) USMP 1 – 1 Nacional (Uruguay)	Draw	Ludueña 88'
2009	Group 3	A	(Peru) USMP 0 – 3 River Plate (Argentina)	Lost	
2009	Round of 16	H	(Peru) USMP 1 – 3 Grêmio (Brazil)	Lost	Arzuaga 34'
2009	Round of 16	A	(Peru) USMP 0 – 2 Grêmio (Brazil)	Lost	
2011	Group 1	A	(Peru) USMP 2 – 0 Once Caldas (Colombia)	Won	Arriola 37' 59' Alemanno 41'
2011	Group 1	H	(Peru) USMP 2 – 0 San Luis (Mexico)	Won	Labarthe 6'
2011	Group 1	A	(Peru) USMP 1 – 5 Libertad (Paraguay)	Lost	Alemanno 4'
2011	Group 1	H	(Peru) USMP 0 – 1 Libertad (Paraguay)	Lost	
2011	Group 1	A	(Peru) USMP 1 – 3 San Luis (Mexico)	Lost	Quinteros 60'
2011	Group 1	H	(Peru) USMP 0 – 2 Once Caldas (Colombia)	Lost	

Copa Sudamericana
Year	Round	H/A	Score	Result	Scorers
2006	Chile/Peru Preliminary	A	(Peru) USMP 0 – 1 Coronel Bolognesi (Peru)	Lost	
2006	Chile/Peru Preliminary	H	(Peru) USMP 3 – 2 Coronel Bolognesi (Peru)	Won	Del Solar 13' 40'; Villareal 69'
2010	First Round	A	(Peru) USMP 2 – 3 Deportivo Quito (Ecuador)	Lost	Vitti 51', Alemanno 74'
2010	First Round	H	(Peru) USMP 2 – 1 Deportivo Quito (Ecuador)	Won	Arriola 78', Alemanno 85'
2010	Second Round	H	(Peru) USMP 2 – 1 Emelec (Ecuador)	Won	Vitti 45', Quinteros 74'
2010	Chile/Peru Preliminary	H	(Peru) USMP 0 – 5 Emelec (Ecuador)	Lost	
2012	Ecuador/Peru Preliminary	A	(Peru) USMP 0 – 1 Emelec (Ecuador)	Lost	
2012	Ecuador/Peru Preliminary	H	(Peru) USMP 1 – 1 Emelec (Ecuador)	Draw	Labarthe 11'

== Current squad ==
As of 13 April 2025

Note: Flags indicate national team as defined under FIFA eligibility rules; some limited exceptions apply. Players may hold more than one non-FIFA nationality.

No.	Pos.	Nation	Player
1	GK	PER	Alessandro Cavagna
3	DF	PER	Diego Minaya
4	DF	PER	Rodrigo Cuba
5	DF	ARG	Brian Flores
6	MF	COL	Santiago Cortes
7	FW	PER	Héctor Bazán
8	MF	PER	Tarek Carranza
9	FW	PER	Héctor Zeta
10	MF	PER	Joel Sánchez
11	FW	PER	Mauricio Matzuda
12	GK	PER	Diego López
13	MF	PER	Cristian Vega
14	DF	PER	Antonio Yáñez
15	DF	PER	Jean Pierre Mendoza
16	FW	PER	Jeanpiero Falconi
17	FW	COL	Juan Fernando Caicedo

No.	Pos.	Nation	Player
18	FW	PER	Austing Arteaga
19	DF	PER	Iván Chumpitaz
20	MF	PER	Raziel García
21	MF	PER	José Romero
23	DF	PER	Rodrigo Vargas
24	MF	PER	Fabrizio Mezarina
25	FW	PER	Homali Ruiz
26	FW	PER	Dennis Reyes
27	FW	PER	Johan Gonzales
28	MF	PER	Diego Huacachin
29	FW	PER	Damián Ísmodes (Captain)
30	FW	PER	Sebastián Cornejo
39	DF	PER	Faride Vera
58	GK	PER	Julio Aliaga
90	MF	PER	Armando Alfageme

== Managers ==
=== Current staff ===
As of 20 September 2020

=== Managerial history ===
Name	Nat	From	To	Pld	W	D	L	GF	GA	Pts	Competitions
Juan Carlos Oblitas	(Peru)	29 February 2004	25 April 2004	11	1	2	8	10	22	5	2004 Torneo Descentralizado
Jorge Machuca	(Peru)	2 May 2004	23 May 2004	7	0	1	6	4	13	1	2004 Torneo Descentralizado
Fernando Cuellar	(Peru)	9 June 2004	20 June 2004	4	0	1	3	4	9	1	2004 Torneo Descentralizado
César Chávez-Riva	(Peru)	31 July 2004	22 August 2004	4	1	0	3	3	6	3	2004 Torneo Descentralizado
Oscar Malbernat	(Argentina)	12 September 2004	8 May 2005	36	15	8	13	47	38	53	2004 Torneo Descentralizado; 2005 Torneo Descentralizado
Mario Flores	(Peru)	11 May 2005	11 May 2005	1	0	1	0	1	1	1	2005 Torneo Descentralizado
Víctor Rivera	(Peru)	15 May 2005	31 July 2005	13	7	3	3	20	13	24	2005 Torneo Descentralizado
Rafael Castillo	(Peru)	6 August 2005	2 April 2006	33	18	7	8	51	33	61	2005 Torneo Descentralizado; 2006 Torneo Descentralizado
Víctor Rivera	(Peru)	16 April 2006	16 April 2006	1	0	1	0	2	2	1	2006 Torneo Descentralizado
Juan Antonio Pizzi	(Spain)	23 April 2006	26 November 2006	33	13	8	12	36	38	47	2006 Copa Sudamericana; 2006 Torneo Descentralizado
Víctor Rivera	(Peru)	2 December 2006	3 September 2009	143	65	40	38	215	146	235	2006 Torneo Descentralizado; 2007 Torneo Descentralizado; 2008 Copa Libertadores; 2008 Torneo Descentralizado; 2009 Copa Libertadores; 2009 Torneo Descentralizado
Gustavo Matosas	(Uruguay)	4 September 2009	23 December 2009	14	6	4	4	19	14	22	2009 Torneo Descentralizado
Aníbal Ruiz	(Uruguay)	18 January 2010	4 December 2011	50	31	8	11	96	51	101	2010 Copa Sudamericana; 2010 Torneo Descentralizado; 2011 Copa Libertadores; 2011 Torneo Descentralizado
Franco Navarro	(Peru)	15 December 2011	30 June 2012	17	6	4	7	20	22	22	2012 Torneo Descentralizado
Ángel Cappa	(Argentina)	1 July 2012	25 November 2012	8	3	3	2	0	0	12	2012 Copa Sudamericana; 2012 Torneo Descentralizado
Aníbal Ruiz	(Uruguay)	7 December 2012	16 April 2013	0	0	0	0	0	0	0	2013 Torneo Descentralizado
Orlando Lavalle	(Peru)	15 April 2013	15 May 2013	0	0	0	0	0	0	0	2013 Torneo Descentralizado
Julio César Uribe	(Peru)	15 May 2013	21 November 2014	44	17	9	18	47	42	60	2014 Torneo del Inca; 2014 Torneo Descentralizado
Christian Díaz	(Argentina)	3 January 2015	30 November 2015	44	16	8	18	43	47	57	2015 Torneo del Inca; 2015 Torneo Descentralizado
'Chemo' del Solar	(Peru)	4 January 2016	16 December 2016	44	15	10	19	61	72	55	2016 Torneo Descentralizado
Orlando Lavalle	(Peru)	3 January 2017	3 December 2017	44	14	8	22	63	74	50	2017 Torneo Descentralizado
Carlos Bustos	(Argentina)	26 December 2017	28 November 2019	82	22	35	25	99	111	99	2018 Torneo Descentralizado; 2019 Liga 1; 2019 Copa Bicentenario
Héctor Bidoglio	(Argentina) (Venezuela)	14 December 2019	15 March 2021	28	10	7	11	32	37	37	2020 Liga 1
José Espinoza	(Peru)	16 March 2021	29 March 2021	2	1	0	1	2	3	3	2021 Liga 1
César Payovich	(Uruguay)	30 March 2021	20 September 2021	20	5	5	10	14	26	20	2021 Liga 1; 2021 Copa Bicentenario
José Espinoza	(Peru)	20 September 2021	31 December 2021	8	2	1	5	6	17	7	2021 Liga 1
Juan José Luvera	(Argentina)	27 January 2022	5 April 2022	8	1	0	7	6	21	3	2022 Liga 1
Víctor Rivera	(Peru)	6 April 2022	19 September 2022	21	4	4	13	26	45	16	2022 Liga 1
Orlando Lavalle	(Peru)	19 September 2022	17 February 2023	7	0	2	5	6	18	2	2022 Liga 1
Duilio Cisneros	(Peru)	21 February 2023	Present	30	11	6	13	38	37	39	2023 Liga 2

== Other sports ==
=== Women's Volleyball ===
Universidad San Martín has a women's volleyball team that participates in the Liga Peruana de Vóley Femenino, the highest tier in Peruvian women's volleyball. They won their first title in the 2013–14 season, after being runners-up in the previous two seasons. Universidad San Martín were runners-up in the 2016 Women's South American Volleyball Club Championship.

Type	Competition	Titles	Runner-up	Third place	Winning years	Runner-up years	Third place years
National (League)	Liga Peruana de Vóley Femenino	5	4	2	2013–14, 2014–15, 2015–16, 2017–18, 2018–19	2011–12, 2012–13, 2016–17, 2023–24	2022–23, 2024–25
International (Cups)	Campeonato Sudamericano de Clubes de Voleibol Femenino	—	1	2	—	2016	2015, 2017

=== Men's Futsal ===
Type	Competition	Titles	Runner-up	Winning years	Runner-up years
National (League)	Primera División Futsal Pro	1	—	2007	—

- Copa Libertadores de Futsal: 1 appearance

2008: Group stage
