= 2010 CD Universidad San Martín season =

University of San Martín de Porres
2010 season
- Chairman: University of San Martín de Porres
- Manager: Aníbal Ruiz
- Primera División Peruana 2010: Full Table: Champion; *Regular Season: 1st *Liguilla: 1st
- Copa Sudamericana: Second Stage

The 2010 season was the 7th season of competitive football by University of San Martín de Porres.

== Statistics ==
=== Appearances and goals ===
Number	Position	Name	Copa Sudamericana		Liguilla		Regular Season		Total	
Number	Position	Name	Apps	Goals	Apps	Goals	Apps	Goals	Apps	Goals

=== Competition Overload ===
Club World Cup	Recopa	Libertadores	Sudamericana	Primera División	Liguilla 'A'	Regular Season
			Second Stage	Champion: Third title	1st	1st

== Copa Sudamericana 2010 ==
=== Second stage ===
Date	Opponent team	Home/Away	Score	Scorers
15 September 2010	(Ecuador) Emelec	H	2 – 1	Vitti 45', Quinteros 74'
23 September 2010	(Ecuador) Emelec	A	0 – 5	

=== First stage ===
Date	Opponent team	Home/Away	Score	Scorers
4 August 2010	(Ecuador) Deportivo Quito	A	2 – 3	Vitti 51', Alemanno 74'
10 August 2010	(Ecuador) Deportivo Quito	H	2 – 1	Arriola 78', Alemanno 85'

== Primera División Peruana 2010 ==
=== Final Nacional ===
Date	Opponent team	Home/Away	Score	Scorers
8 December 2010	León de Huánuco	A	1 – 1	Alemanno 90' + 3'
12 December 2010	León de Huánuco	H	2 – 1	Pedro García 15', Vitti 25'

=== Liguilla Final – Group A ===
Date	Opponent team	Home/Away	Score	Scorers
12 September 2010	Sporting Cristal	A	1 – 0	
19 September 2010	José Gálvez FBC	H	3 – 0	
26 September 2010	Colegio Nacional de Iquitos	A	1 – 0	
30 September 2010	Universitario	H	1 – 0	
16 October 2010	Inti Gas	A	1 – 2	
22 October 2010	Total Chalaco	A	5 – 1	
27 October 2010	Alianza Lima	H	4 – 0	
1 November 2010	Sporting Cristal	H	1 – 0	
6 November 2010	José Gálvez FBC	A	0 – 0	
10 November 2010	Colegio Nacional de Iquitos	H	3 – 1	
14 November 2010	Universitario	A	0 – 1	
21 November 2010	Inti Gas	H	4 – 1	
28 November 2010	Total Chalaco	H	1 – 2	
4 December 2010	Alianza Lima	A	1 – 1	

=== Regular season ===
Date	Opponent team	Home/Away	Score	Scorers
14 February 2010	Colegio Nacional de Iquitos	H	3 – 1	
21 February 2010	Cienciano	A	3 – 1	
28 February 2010	Alianza Lima	H	0 – 1	
6 March 2010	Inti Gas	A	4 – 1	
24 March 2010	Juan Aurich	H	1 – 0	
21 March 2010	Sporting Cristal	A	4 – 0	
29 March 2010	Total Chalaco	H	3 – 1	
4 April 2010	José Gálvez FBC	A	1 – 1	
11 April 2010	León de Huánuco	H	3 – 2	
17 April 2010	U. César Vallejo	A	0 – 2	
25 April 2010	Sport Huancayo	H	2 – 1	
1 May 2010	Alianza Atlético	H	4 – 0	
8 May 2010	Sport Boys	A	1 – 0	
14 May 2010	Universitario	H	1 – 1	
23 May 2010	F.B.C. Melgar	A	4 – 1	
30 May 2010	Colegio Nacional de Iquitos	A	2 – 2	
6 June 2010	Cienciano	H	3 – 0	
9 June 2010	Alianza Lima	A	1 – 2	
13 June 2010	Inti Gas	H	2 – 1	
20 June 2010	Juan Aurich	A	1 – 1	
27 June 2010	Sporting Cristal	H	2 – 1	
4 July 2010	Total Chalaco	A	2 – 2	
11 July 2010	José Gálvez FBC	H	4 – 0	
18 July 2010	León de Huánuco	A	2 – 4	
25 July 2010	U. César Vallejo	H	1 – 0	
1 August 2010	Sport Huancayo	A	2 – 1	
7 August 2010	Alianza Atlético	A	3 – 0	
13 August 2010	Sport Boys	H	2 – 1	
21 August 2010	Universitario	A	0 – 1	
28 August 2010	F.B.C. Melgar	H	0 – 1	
