= 2015 Club Universitario de Deportes season =

Universitario de Deportes
2015 season
- Manager: Óscar Ibañez; Carlos Silvestri; Luis Fernando Suarez; Juan Pajuelo; Roberto Challe
- Stadium: Estadio Monumental
- Peruvian Primera División: 7th
- Copa Sudamericana: Second stage
- Torneo del Inca: Group stage
Home colours	Away colours

The 2015 season was Universitario de Deportes' 91st season since its founding in 1924. The club played the Torneo Descentralizado and the Copa Sudamericana.

== Competitions ==
=== Torneo del Inca ===
Pos	Team	Pld	W	D	L	GF	GA	GD	Pts
4	Alianza Atlético	10	3	0	7	12	17	−5	9
5	Universitario	10	3	0	7	10	17	−7	9
6	UTC	10	3	0	7	8	20	−12	9

Match won	Match drawn	Match lost

1	Universitario	1–0	León de Huánuco	Lima, Peru
				Stadium: Monumental U

2	Real Garcilaso	4–0	Universitario	Cusco, Peru
				Stadium: Inca Garcilaso

3	Universitario	2–1	UTC	Lima, Peru
				Stadium: Monumental U

4	Universitario	0–1	César Vallejo	Lima, Peru
				Stadium: Monumental

5	Alianza Atlético	2–1	Universitario	Piura, Peru
				Stadium: Miguel Grau

6	Universitario	3–0	Alianza Atlético	Lima, Peru
				Stadium: Monumental

7	César Vallejo	2–1	Universitario	Trujillo, Peru
				Stadium: Mansiche

8	UTC	1–0	Universitario	Cajamarca, Peru
				Stadium: Héroes de San Ramón

9	Universitario	1–4	Real Garcilaso	Lima, Peru
				Stadium: Monumental

10	León de Huanuco	2–1	Universitario	Huánuco, Peru
				Stadium: Heraclio Tapia

=== Torneo Descentralizado ===
==== Torneo Apertura ====
Pos	Team	Pld	W	D	L	GF	GA	GD	Pts
13	Sport Loreto	16	4	5	7	14	18	−4	17
14	Universitario	16	3	6	7	10	17	−7	15
15	Ayacucho	16	4	3	9	15	25	−10	15

Results

Home \ Away	AAS	ALI	CIE	MUN	AYA	JA	LEÓ	MEL	RGA	CRI	SHU	LOR	UCO	UCV	USM	UTC	UNI
Alianza Atlético																	
Alianza Lima																	1–0
Cienciano																	1–0
Deportivo Municipal																	
Ayacucho																	
Juan Aurich																	
León de Huánuco																	
Melgar																	
Real Garcilaso																	
Sporting Cristal																	
Sport Huancayo																	0–0
Sport Loreto																	0–1
Unión Comercio																	1–0
Universidad César Vallejo																	4–2
Universidad San Martín																	0–1
UTC																	2–0
Universitario	1–1			0–1	2–0	1–1	1–4	0–0	1–1	0–0							

Updated to match(es) played on February 2015. Source: ADFP - official fixture
Legend: Blue = home team win; Yellow = draw; Red = away team win.

==== Torneo Clausura ====
Pos	Team	Pld	W	D	L	GF	GA	GD	Pts
3	Sport Huancayo	16	8	4	4	28	20	+8	28
4	Universitario	16	8	4	4	26	20	+6	28
5	Sporting Cristal	16	7	6	3	35	24	+11	27

Results

Home \ Away	AAS	ALI	CIE	MUN	AYA	JA	LEÓ	MEL	RGA	CRI	SHU	LOR	UCO	UCV	USM	UTC	UNI
Alianza Atlético																	1–2
Alianza Lima																	
Cienciano																	
Deportivo Municipal																	0–1
Ayacucho																	1–2
Juan Aurich																	2–2
León de Huánuco																	3–2
Melgar																	2–0
Real Garcilaso																	4–2
Sporting Cristal																	1–2
Sport Huancayo																	
Sport Loreto																	
Unión Comercio																	
Universidad César Vallejo																	
Universidad San Martín																	
UTC																	
Universitario		1–1	2–1								2–0	0–0	2–3	3–0	2–0	1–1	

Updated to match(es) played on February 2015. Source: ADFP - official fixture
Legend: Blue = home team win; Yellow = draw; Red = away team win.

=== Copa Sudamericana ===
Match won	Match drawn	Match lost

First stage

Universitario started well in the Copa Sudamericana, after beating Deportivo Anzoátegui 3–1 in the first leg played at the National Stadium, it was easier than imagined for the Peruvian club to overcome the Venezuelans since not even the first 30 minutes of the game were played and the 'U' was already winning 2–0 with some comfort.

In the second leg, Universitario de Deportes beat Deportivo Anzoátegui 3–1 with goals from Dulanto, Ruidíaz and Alemanno. In this way, the Peruvians achieved a comfortable qualification to the second stage.

August 11, 2015	Universitario (Peru)	3–1	(Venezuela) Deportivo Anzoátegui	Estadio Nacional, Lima
21:15 UTC−5	Giménez 12'; Romero 28'; Alemanno 56'	Report	Aguilar 59'	Referee: Ulises Mereles (Paraguay)

August 20, 2015	Deportivo Anzoátegui (Venezuela)	1–3	(Peru) Universitario	Estadio José Antonio Anzoátegui, Barcelona
17:00 UTC−4:30	Aguilar 61'	Report	Dulanto 5'; Ruidíaz 76'; Alemanno 88'	Referee: Diego Lara (Ecuador)

Second stage

August 26, 2015	Defensor Sporting (Uruguay)	3–0	(Peru) Universitario	Estadio Luis Franzini, Montevideo
16:30 UTC−3	Acuña 69', 88'; Lozano 75'	Report		Referee: Enrique Osses (Chile)

September 15, 2015	Universitario (Peru)	0–1	(Uruguay) Defensor Sporting	Estadio Monumental, Lima
19:30 UTC−5		Report	Castro 4'	Referee: Omar Ponce (Ecuador)
