= 2004 CD Universidad San Martín season =

Universidad San Martín de Porres
2004 season
- Chairman: Universidad San Martín de Porres
- Manager: Juan Carlos Oblitas (25 Apr); Jorge Machuca (23 May); Fernando Cuellar (20 Jun); C. Chávez - Riva (22 Aug); Oscar Malbernat
- Primera División Peruana 2004: Full Table: 12° *Apertura: 14° *Clausura: 2°

The 2005 season was the 1st season of competitive football by Universidad San Martín de Porres.

== Statistics ==
=== Appearances and goals ===
Number	Position	Name	Torneo Apertura		Torneo Clausura		Total	
Number	Position	Name	Apps	Goals	Apps	Goals	Apps	Goals

=== Competition Overload ===
Intercontinental Cup	Recopa	Libertadores	Sudamericana	Primera División	Apertura	Clausura
				12th	14th	2nd

== Primera División Peruana 2004 ==
=== Apertura 2004 ===
Date	Opponent team	Home/Away	Score	Scorers
29 February 2004	F.B.C. Melgar	A	1–3	Fernandez
3 March 2004	Estudiantes de Medicina - Atlético Grau	H	2–2	Ortega, Ismodes
7 March 2004	Sport Boys	H	3–1	Ortega, Ismodes, Villanueva
13 March 2004	Universitario	A	0–1	
21 March 2004	U. César Vallejo	H	0–1	
4 April 2004	Cienciano	A	0–1	
11 April 2004	Alianza Atlético	H	1–3	Chichizola
14 April 2004	Atlético Universidad	A	1–1	Ubillus
18 April 2004	Alianza Lima	H	1–4	Fernandez
21 April 2004	Coronel Bolognesi	A	1–4	Sheput
25 April 2004	Deportivo Wanka	H	0–1	
2 May 2004	Sporting Cristal	A	0–3	
5 May 2004	Unión Huaral	H	1–2	Ismodes
9 May 2004	F.B.C. Melgar	H	0–1	
12 May 2004	Estudiantes de Medicina - Atlético Grau	A	2–2	Neffen, Ismodes
16 May 2004	Sport Boys	A	0–2	
19 May 2004	Universitario	H	1–2	Flores
23 May 2004	U. César Vallejo	A	0–1	
9 June 2004	Cienciano	H	1–1	Villanueva
13 June 2004	Alianza Atlético	A	1–2	Prado
16 June 2004	Atlético Universidad	H	2–4	Ismodes, Fernandez
20 June 2004	Alianza Lima	A	0–2	
31 July 2004	Coronel Bolognesi	H	1–0	Ismodes
8 August 2004	Deportivo Wanka	A	1–2	Ubillus
15 August 2004	Sporting Cristal	H	1–3	Carrillo
22 August 2004	Unión Huaral	A	0–1	

=== Clausura 2004 ===
Date	Opponent team	Home/Away	Score	Scorers
12 September 2004	F.B.C. Melgar	A	4–4	Ismodes (x2), Cominges, Mandra
15 September 2004	Estudiantes de Medicina - Atlético Grau	H	1–0	Cominges
18 September 2004	Sport Boys	H	0–0	
22 September 2004	Universitario	A	0–1	
26 September 2004	U. César Vallejo	H	3–0	Mandra, Olveira, Cominges
30 September 2004	Cienciano	A	0–0	
3 October 2004	Alianza Atlético	H	2–1	Ismodes, Serrano
13 October 2004	Atlético Universidad	A	1–2	Cominges
20 October 2004	Alianza Lima	H	1–3	Casas
24 October 2004	Coronel Bolognesi	A	0–0	
27 October 2004	Deportivo Wanka	H	2–1	Serrano, Ismodes
31 October 2004	Sporting Cristal	A	0–1	
3 November 2004	Unión Huaral	H	0–2	
7 November 2004	F.B.C. Melgar	H	2–1	Cominges, Chala
10 November 2004	Estudiantes de Medicina - Atlético Grau	A	3–0	Ismodes, Sheput, Villanueva
21 November 2004	Sport Boys	A	0–2	
24 November 2004	Universitario	H	2–0	Vegas, Cominges
28 November 2004	U. César Vallejo	A	2–1	Cominges (x2)
1 December 2004	Cienciano	H	1–1	Carrillo
5 December 2004	Alianza Atlético	A	4–1	Olvera, Serrano, Cominges, Mandra
8 December 2004	Atlético Universidad	H	1–0	Cominges
12 December 2004	Alianza Lima	A	1–2	Sheput
15 December 2004	Coronel Bolognesi	H	5–2	Villanueva, Cominges, Chala, Carrillo, Prado
17 December 2004	Deportivo Wanka	A	2–0	awarded to SMP
22 December 2004	Sporting Cristal	H	2–1	Mandra, Ismodes
26 December 2004	Unión Huaral	A	1–0	Mandra

== Pre-season friendlies ==
Date	Opponent team	Home/Away	Score	Scorers
21 February 2004	(Peru) Sporting Cristal	H	1–3	
