= 2010 Torneo de Promoción y Reservas =

Torneo de Promoción y Reservas
- Season: 2010
- Champions: Universidad César Vallejo; 1st title

The Torneo de Promoción y Reservas is a football tournament in Peru. There are currently 16 clubs in the league. It will play from the year 2010 in a simultaneous way and preliminary to the Torneo Descentralizado among the 16 teams of first division. Each team will have in staff to twelve 21-year-old players, three of 19 and three experienced; whenever they be recorded in the club. The team champion in this tournament will offer two points and the runner-up a point of bonus to the respective regular team in the 2010 Torneo Descentralizado.

== Clubs ==
Locations of the 2010 Torneo de Promoción y Reserva teams

Team	City	Stadium	Capacity	Field
Alianza Atlético	Sullana	Municipal La Unión^{[A]}	5,000	Grass
Alianza Lima	Lima	Alejandro Villanueva	35,000	Grass
Cienciano	Cusco	Garcilaso	40,000	Grass
CNI	Iquitos	Max Augustín	24,000	Artificial
Inti Gas	Ayacucho	Ciudad de Cumaná	15,000	Grass
José Gálvez	Chimbote	Manuel Rivera Sánchez	25,000	Artificial
Juan Aurich	Chiclayo	Elías Aguirre	24,500	Artificial
León de Huánuco	Huánuco	Heraclio Tapia	15,000	Grass
Melgar	Arequipa	Virgen de Chapi	60,000	Grass
Sport Boys	Callao	Miguel Grau	17,000	Grass
Sport Huancayo	Huancayo	Huancayo	20,000	Grass
Sporting Cristal	Lima	San Martín de Porres	18,000	Grass
Total Chalaco	Huacho	Segundo Aranda Torres	12,000	Grass
Universidad César Vallejo	Trujillo	Mansiche	25,000	Artificial
Universidad San Martín	Lima	San Martín de Porres	18,000	Grass
Universitario	Lima	Monumental	80,093	Grass

== League table ==
=== Standings ===
Pos	Team	Pld	W	D	L	GF	GA	GD	Pts	Qualification
1	Universidad César Vallejo	30	19	4	7	58	29	+29	61	Champion; Bonus +2 to 2010 Torneo Descentralizado
2	Alianza Lima	30	17	7	6	71	35	+36	58	
3	Universidad San Martín	30	17	7	6	50	25	+25	58	Runner-up; Bonus +1 to 2010 Torneo Descentralizado
4	Sporting Cristal	30	15	8	7	50	30	+20	53	
5	Juan Aurich	30	13	9	8	46	35	+11	48	
6	Inti Gas	30	13	9	8	35	26	+9	48	
7	Sport Boys	30	13	5	12	45	39	+6	44	
8	León de Huánuco	30	11	8	11	40	40	0	41	
9	CNI	30	11	6	13	42	49	−7	39	
10	Sport Huancayo	30	10	5	15	32	40	−8	35	
11	Universitario	30	7	12	11	29	35	−6	33	
12	Melgar	30	9	6	15	39	54	−15	33	
13	José Gálvez	30	9	3	18	33	51	−18	30	
14	Alianza Atlético	30	8	5	17	35	64	−29	29	
15	Total Chalaco	30	7	7	16	35	50	−15	28	
16	Cienciano	30	6	9	15	27	62	−35	27	

Source: FIFA Standings
Rules for classification: 1) points; 2) goal difference; 3) number of goals scored.

=== Results ===
Home \ Away	AAS	ALI	CIE	CNI	MEL	IGD	JG	JA	LEÓ	SBA	CRI	SHU	TCH	UCV	USM	UNI
Alianza Atlético		1–3	3–0	1–1	1–0	1–1	1–2	0–2	1–2	0–3	4–2	2–1	1–3	1–5	1–0	0–3
Alianza Lima	2–0		7–0	2–0	3–0	0–0	4–0	3–0	2–1	2–2	2–1	2–3	6–2	1–2	2–2	2–1
Cienciano	0–2	0–1		3–0	2–1	2–1	0–3	3–1	1–1	3–2	0–1	1–0	2–2	1–1	2–3	0–0
CNI	4–2	3–3	2–2		1–4	3–0	0–3	1–2	2–0	1–1	1–2	1–0	3–2	1–0	2–3	2–1
Melgar	2–1	1–5	1–1	2–2		0–1	1–0	0–2	3–1	0–1	2–1	2–3	1–0	3–4	2–1	3–0
Inti Gas	3–0	2–1	1–1	1–2	5–2		3–1	0–1	1–1	1–0	3–1	0–0	1–0	2–0	2–1	1–0
José Gálvez	1–2	2–3	5–1	1–0	1–0	1–0		0–3	0–3	0–1	0–1	3–1	2–1	0–3	1–2	1–1
Juan Aurich	4–0	2–1	2–0	5–1	2–2	0–0	1–1		1–1	0–3	1–1	1–0	0–1	1–1	1–1	0–0
León de Huánuco	3–3	1–1	3–1	2–1	4–1	2–0	1–0	1–0		1–2	1–1	0–1	3–1	2–1	0–1	1–1
Sport Boys	2–0	2–1	6–0	1–2	1–1	1–2	3–0	1–5	2–0		3–2	0–1	0–1	1–3	2–0	0–2
Sporting Cristal	2–2	2–1	3–0	1–0	4–1	0–0	3–0	1–2	6–1	4–0		1–0	2–1	0–1	1–0	1–1
Sport Huancayo	2–2	1–3	1–0	1–3	1–0	1–0	2–0	3–4	1–1	2–0	1–2		1–2	2–1	0–1	0–1
Total Chalaco	4–1	0–2	6–0	0–0	0–1	2–2	2–2	2–0	0–2	0–3	1–1	0–0		0–1	0–3	1–1
Universidad César Vallejo	3–0	1–1	2–0	2–1	4–1	2–1	3–2	1–0	3–1	3–0	1–1	3–1	3–0		0–1	2–0
Universidad San Martín	3–0	1–3	0–0	2–1	1–1	0–0	3–0	4–1	1–0	0–0	0–0	3–1	4–1	2–1		1–0
Universitario	1–2	2–2	1–1	0–1	1–1	0–1	2–1	2–2	1–0	2–2	0–2	1–1	2–0	2–1	0–3	

Updated to match(es) played on August 29, 2010. Source: RSSSF
Legend: Blue = home team win; Yellow = draw; Red = away team win.

== Second Place playoff ==
1 September 2010

Alianza Lima	1–2	Universidad San Martín

Miguel Grau

== Top goalscorers ==
14 goals

- (Peru) Francesco Recalde (Universidad César Vallejo)
- (Peru) Diago Portugal (Alianza Lima)

12 goals

- (Peru) Franco Navarro (Sporting Cristal)
- (Peru) Javier Carnero(Melgar)

11 goals

- (Peru) Fernando García (Juan Aurich)

10 goals

- (Peru) Christian Carranza (Universidad César Vallejo)

9 goals

- (Peru) Diego Pizarro (Sport Boys)
- (Peru) Hans Bardales (Total Chalaco)
- (Peru) André Carrillo (Alianza Lima)
- (Peru) Robert Tarrillo (Alianza Lima)
