= Sergio Almirón =

Sergio Almiron is the name of three Argentine footballers:

- Sergio Almirón (footballer, born 1958), Argentine football centre-forward and World Cup winner
- Sergio Almirón (footballer, born 1980), Argentine football manager and former midfielder
- Sergio Almirón (footballer, born 1985), Argentine football forward for Carlos Stein
