= Diego Pizarro =

Peruvian footballer (born 1990)

Personal information
- Full name: Diego Enrique Pizarro Bosio
- Date of birth: 14 August 1990 (age 36)
- Place of birth: Lima, Peru
- Height: 1.81 m (5 ft 11 in)
- Positions: Striker; winger

Youth career
- Bayern Munich

Senior career*
Years	Team	Apps	(Gls)
2007–2009	Bayern Munich II	36	(7)
2009	Coronel Bolognesi	0	(0)
2010	Sport Boys	2	(0)
2011	Colegio Nacional Iquitos	23	(0)
2012–2013	Cienciano	50	(9)
2014	Unión Comercio	6	(0)
2014	Melgar	7	(0)
2015	Juan Aurich	4	(0)
2015	Cienciano	10	(1)
2016–2019	Cantolao		
2020	Comerciantes Unidos	4	(0)
Total		142	(17)
- * Club domestic league appearances and goals as of 12:36, 2 July 2017 (UTC)

Diego Enrique Pizarro Bosio (born 14 August 1990) is a Peruvian professional footballer who plays as a striker or winger. He is the younger brother of striker Claudio Pizarro.

== Club career ==
Diego developed as footballer within Bayern Munich's youth academy. On 31 August 2009, it was announced that he joined Peruvian club Coronel Bolognesi for the last part of the 2009 Descentralizado season. However, he did not manage to play for Bolognesi as he suffered an injury that kept him from making his debut. At the end of the 2009 season Bolognesi was relegated to the second division.

In January 2010, he signed for Peruvian club Sport Boys Association for the start of the 2010 Descentralizado season. Diego made his professional debut in the Peruvian First Division on 29 May 2010 in an away match against José Gálvez FBC. He entered the match in the 73rd minute replacing Miguel Curiel. That season Diego mainly played for the Sport Boys reserve team and finished as the top goal scorer for his team in the 2010 Torneo de Promoción y Reserva with 9 goals. His last appearance for Sport Boys in the Peruvian First Division was on 17 October 2010 in a 2–1 win at home against Universidad César Vallejo.

On 31 January 2011, it was announced that Diego joined Peruvian club Colegio Nacional de Iquitos for the start of the 2011 Descentralizado season.
