= 2010 FBC Melgar season =

FBC Melgar
2010 season
- Stadium: Estadio Monumental Virgen de Chapi
- Torneo Descentralizado: Primera Etapa: Tenth (10°); Liguilla Par: Sixth (6°); Aggregate Table: Twelfth (12°); Twelfth National (12°)
Home colours	Away colours	Third colours

The 2010 FBC Melgar season were the Ninety-Sixth (96.º) of the club from its foundation in 1915, Forty-One (41) participations in the top-flight of Peruvian Primera División (of 94 Editions) with denomination Torneo Descentralizado. In Previous Season the club qualified as 8th Place of the 2009 Torneo Descentralizado.

Melgar were a of sixteen (16) clubs in the Forty-Fifth edition (45.º) Torneo Descentralizado, the competition most important of the Peruvian football. The club played the Peruvian Primera División.

== Torneo Descentralizado ==
=== Primera etapa ===
Pos	Team	Pld	W	D	L	GF	GA	GD	Pts
9	Inti Gas	30	12	2	16	36	43	-7	38
10	FBC Melgar	30	9	9	12	38	49	-11	36
11	CNI^{1}	30	10	7	13	39	51	-12	37

== See also ==
- FBC Melgar
- 2010 Torneo Descentralizado
