= Martín Mandra =

Argentine footballer

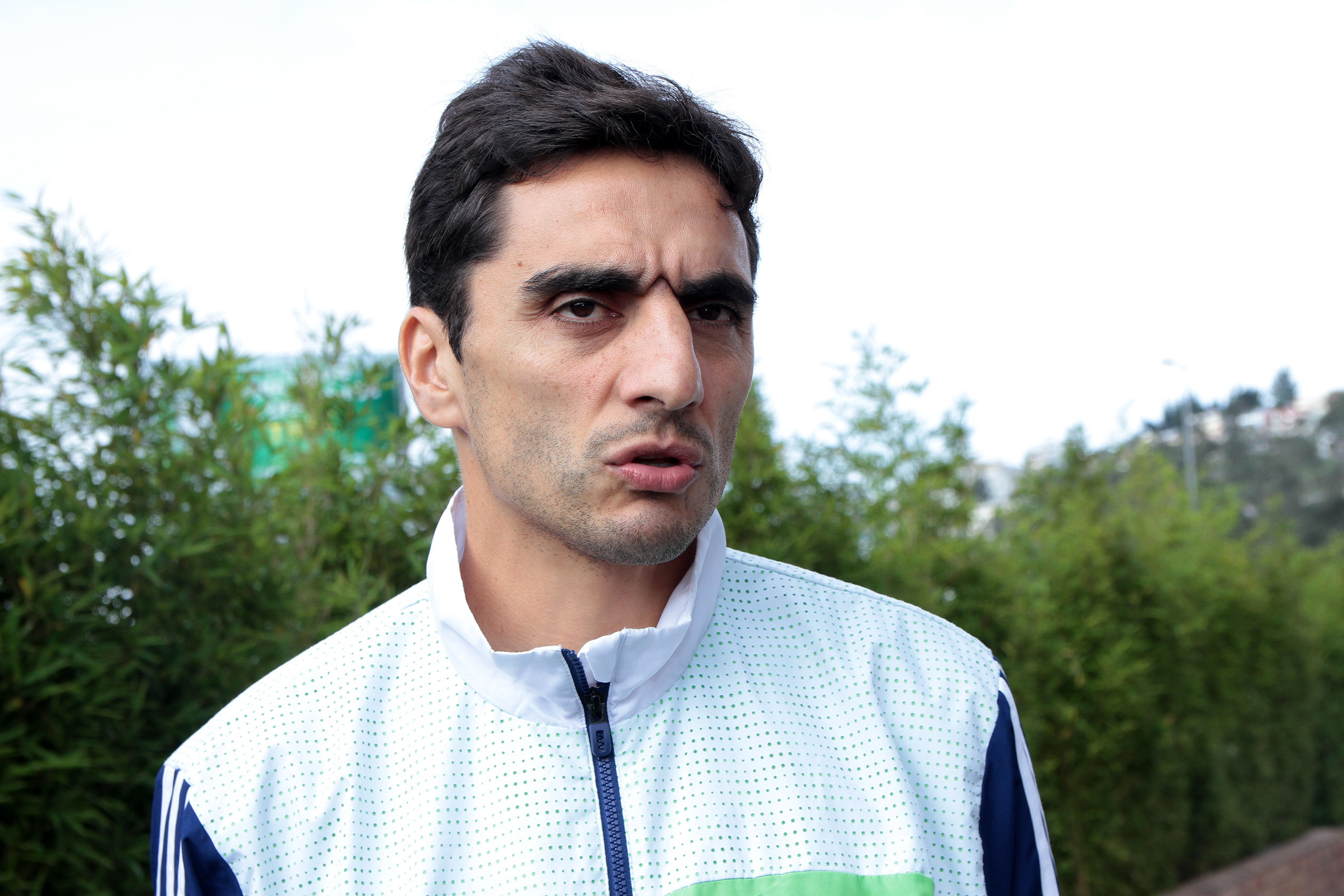
- Mandra in 2015

Personal information
- Full name: Martín Roberto Mandra
- Date of birth: 20 December 1975 (age 50)
- Place of birth: Buenos Aires, Argentina
- Height: 1.84 m (6 ft 0 in)
- Position: Forward

Youth career
- Racing Club

Senior career*
Years	Team	Apps	(Gls)
1995–1997	Racing Club	7	(2)
1996–1997	→ Nueva Chicago (loan)	28	(15)
1998–1999	Ferro Carril Oeste	51	(11)
1999–2000	Rayo Vallecano	2	(0)
2000–2001	Paniliakos	23	(6)
2001–2002	Nueva Chicago	28	(7)
2002–2003	Rosario Central	22	(4)
2003	1. FC Nürnberg	0	(0)
2003	1. FC Nürnberg II	2	(0)
2003	Gimnasia y Esgrima (LP)	7	(0)
2004	Nueva Chicago	16	(2)
2004	Universidad San Martín	18	(5)
2005	Huracán	4	(0)
2005	Belgrano	10	(3)
2006–2007	UD Melilla	26	(6)
2007	Barletta	4	(0)
2007–2008	Deportivo Azogues	21	(11)
2008–2009	→ Deportivo Quito (loan)	60	(18)
2010	Manta F.C.	11	(5)
- * Club domestic league appearances and goals

Martín Roberto Mandra (born 20 December 1975) is an Argentine former professional footballer who played as a forward.

== Club career ==
Born in Buenos Aires, Mandra began his career in the youth ranks of storied Argentine club Racing Club. He made his first appearance in the Clausura 1995 tournament. For the 1996–1997 season he was loaned out to second division side Nueva Chicago where he would net 15 goals in 27 appearances. He then returned to Racing but than would begin a series of moves to various clubs throughout the world. He joined Ferro Carril Oeste in 1998 where he was a prominent player netting 11 goals in 51 First Division matches. For the 1999–2000 season Mandra moved to Europe to Madrid club Rayo Vallecano. Mandra received little playing time for Rayo and moved to Greek side Paniliakos at the conclusion of the season. Mandra enjoyed success in Greece, he netted 6 goals in 23 matches. However, after one season in Greece he would return to Argentina to his former club Nueva Chicago, he enjoyed success at the club and then moved on to yet another club in his native land Rosario Central. After two successful seasons in Argentina, Mandra was recruited to play for 2. Bundesliga side 1. FC Nürnberg. After two unhappy months in Germany, Mandra returned to Argentina. For the 2004 season Mandra would sign with Peruvian side Universidad San Martín, the club was in the middle of a battle to avoid relegation and Mandra's 5 goals in 18 appearances helped San Martin remain in the First Division.

Mandra continued with his career as a football nomad as he returned to Argentina in 2005 with Huracán and Belgrano. After receiving an offer to return to Europe, Mandra agreed to join Spanish Segunda División B side UD Melilla as the club's star signing. Mandra had an up and down stay with Melilla, which included questions regarding his Italian passport. Once these issues were resolved he was unable to regain his first team place, and was sold to Italian side Barletta. After a short stay in Italy, Mandra would begin the most successful part of his career. He would sign with Ecuadorian side Deportivo Azogues in 2007 where he scored 11 goals in 21 appearances. This piqued the interest of the top clubs in Ecuador, and for the 2008 season Mandra signed with Deportivo Quito. With Quito Mandra became an adored player as he helped the club to their first league title in 40 years. Mandra was the league's second leading scorer netting 17 goals in 34 league matches. He also participated in the Copa Sudamericana for Deportivo Quito.

== Statistics ==
League	Appearances	Goals
Argentine Primera División	135	26
Primera B Nacional	38	18
CONMEBOL Cup Competitions	4	0
La Liga	2	0
Super League Greece	23	6
Peruvian Primera División	18	5
Ecuadorian Serie A	92	34

== Honours ==
S.D. Quito

- Serie A de Ecuador: Campeonato Ecuatoriano de Fútbol Serie A 2008
