= Carlos Pérez (Paraguayan footballer) =

Paraguayan footballer (born 1984)

Personal information
- Full name: Carlos Alberto Pérez Alcaraz
- Date of birth: 17 May 1984 (age 42)
- Place of birth: Yhú, Paraguay
- Height: 1.79 m (5 ft 10 in)
- Position: Forward

Senior career*
Years	Team	Apps	(Gls)
2004	O'Higgins		
2005–2006	3 de Febrero	51	(5)
2007	Cerro Porteño PF		
2007	12 de Octubre	5	(0)
2008	Sport Boys	21	(9)
2008–2009	Universidad San Martín	5	(2)
2009–2010	Melgar	42	(18)
2011	Independiente FBC	9	(1)
2011	Sport Huancayo	7	(3)
2012	Sport Boys	0	(0)
2012–2013	Pacífico FC	50	(9)
2014–2015	Deportivo Coopsol	49	(34)
2016	Comerciantes Unidos	40	(12)
2017	Cienciano	8	(1)
2017–2018	Comerciantes Unidos	46	(11)
2019	Deportivo Coopsol	20	(6)
2020–2021	Comerciantes Unidos	25	(6)
- * Club domestic league appearances and goals

Carlos Alberto Pérez Alcaraz (born 17 May 1984) is a Paraguayan former footballer who played as a forward.

He played for O'Higgins (2004) in Chile, for 3 de Febrero (2005–06), Cerro Porteño (2007), 12 de Octubre (2007) and Independiente (Campo Grande) (2011) in Paraguay, and for Sport Boys (2008, 2012), San Martín de Porres (2008–09), Melgar (2009–10), Sport Huancayo (2011), Pacífico FC, Deportivo Coopsol, Cienciano and Comerciantes Unidos in Peru.

== Honours ==
Pacífico FC

- Peruvian Segunda División: 2012
