= Orlando Lavalle =

Peruvian football manager (born 1969)

Personal information
- Full name: Orlando Edson Lavalle Zamora
- Date of birth: 22 June 1969 (age 57)
- Place of birth: Lima, Peru

Managerial career
- Years: Team
- 2008–2013: Universidad San Martín (youth)
- 2012: Universidad San Martín (interim)
- 2013: Universidad San Martín
- 2014–2016: Universidad San Martín (youth)
- 2014: Universidad San Martín (interim)
- 2017: Universidad San Martín
- 2018: Deportivo Coopsol
- 2019: Alianza Atlético
- 2019: Comerciantes Unidos
- 2020: Carlos Stein
- 2021–2022: Santos de Nasca
- 2022: Universidad San Martín
- 2023: Carlos Stein

Orlando Edson Lavalle Zamora (born 22 June 1969) is a Peruvian football manager.

== Career ==
Born in Lima, Lavalle began his career in 2008, as manager of Universidad San Martín's youth categories. After being an interim manager of the first team in June 2012, he was named in charge of the side on 16 April 2013, after Aníbal Ruiz left the club.

Lavalle returned to the youth sides after the appointment of Julio César Uribe, but was again interim in November 2014 after Uribe left. On 26 December 2016, he was named manager of the first team for the 2017 season.

After leaving San Martín in the end of 2017, Lavalle took over Liga 2 side Deportivo Coopsol on 8 May 2018. He took over Alianza Atlético the following 9 January, but was replaced by Gustavo Roverano on 12 February.

On 21 March 2019, Lavalle was named in charge of fellow second division side Comerciantes Unidos. He left on 18 June, and took over Carlos Stein in the top tier on 31 December.

Lavalle left Stein on a mutual consent on 19 September 2020, and returned to the second level with Santos de Nasca in December. He was sacked in July 2022, and returned to San Martín on 19 September.
