= Henry Quinteros =

Peruvian footballer (born 1977)

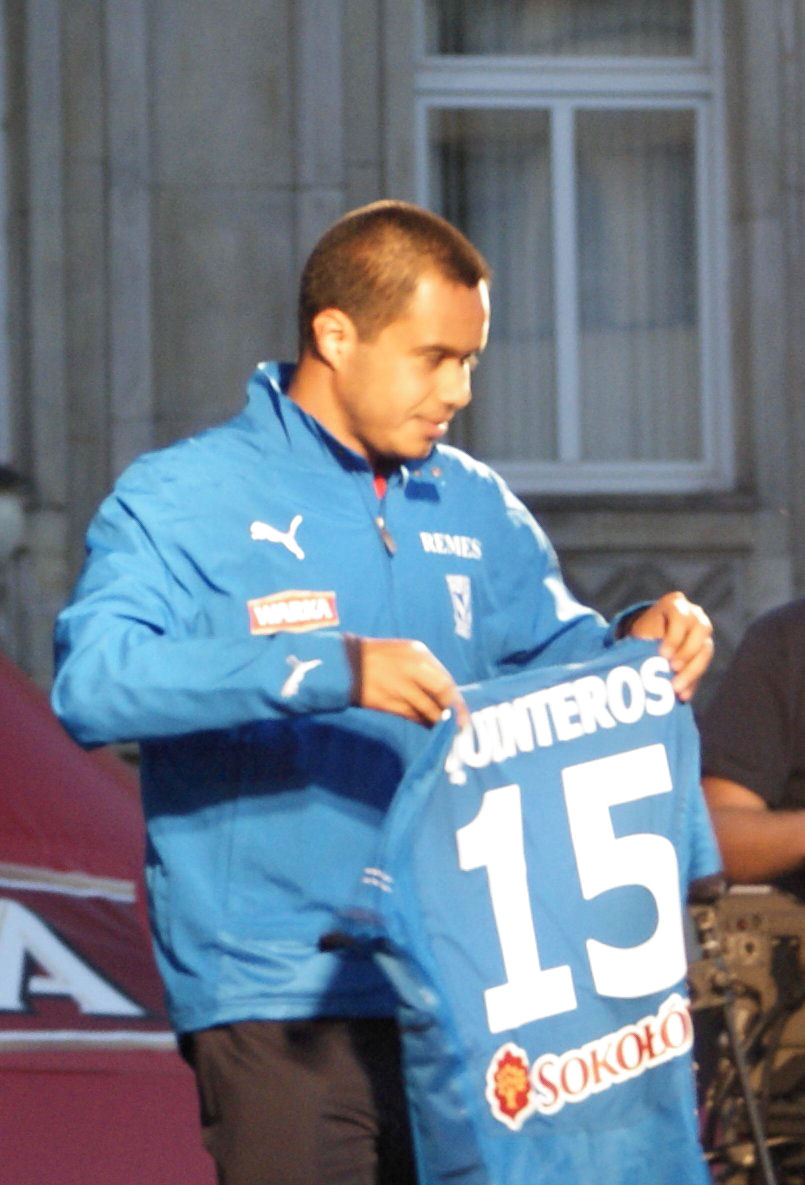
- Quinteros with Lech Poznań

Personal information
- Full name: Henry Edson Quinteros Sánchez
- Date of birth: 19 October 1977 (age 49)
- Place of birth: Lima, Peru
- Height: 1.77 m (5 ft 10 in)
- Position: Midfielder

Youth career
- Alianza Lima

Senior career*
Years	Team	Apps	(Gls)
1995	América Cochahuayco		
1996	Alcides Vigo		
1997	Bella Esperanza		
1998–2003	Alianza Lima	171	(38)
2003–2006	Sporting Cristal	105	(15)
2006–2008	Lech Poznań	41	(10)
2008–2013	Alianza Lima	145	(13)
2014	León de Huánuco	16	(0)
Total		478	(76)

International career
2000–2009	Peru	24	(1)
- * Club domestic league appearances and goals

Henry Edson Quinteros Sánchez (born 19 October 1977) is a Peruvian former professional footballer who played as a midfielder. He is the older brother of Ronald Quinteros.

== Club career ==
Quinteros was born in Lima, the son of Julio Ignacio Quinteros Surco († 2011).

Nicknamed El Pato (The Duck) and/or Kwinto, Quinteros spent his youth career with top Peruvian side Alianza Lima. He started his professional career playing for Segunda División Peruana team Bella Esperanza in the 1997 season. Quinteros returned to Alianza the following season and made his Torneo Descentralizado debut in the 1998 season. He remained at Alianza for five years, being an important player for the club. In 2003, he moved to rival club Sporting Cristal, where he continued to be one of the top players in Peru.

In 2006, he left Peru and joined Polish club Lech Poznań, where he played in central midfield, becoming a fan favourite in Poland. He left Lech Poznań in August 2008 due to personal problems and returned to his original club Alianza Lima.

He retired after playing for León de Huánuco in 2014 in the Torneo Descentralizado.

== International career ==
Quinteros made his debut for the Peru national team on 16 February 2000.

== Honours ==
Allianza Lima

- Torneo Descentralizado: 2001

Sporting Cristal

- Torneo Descentralizado: 2005
