= Gonzalo Ludueña =

Argentine footballer

Personal information
- Full name: Gonzalo Emmanuel Raúl Ludueña
- Date of birth: 12 March 1986 (age 40)
- Place of birth: Córdoba, Argentina
- Height: 1.67 m (5 ft 6 in)
- Positions: Attacking midfielder; winger

Youth career
- 2000–2004: River Plate

Senior career*
Years	Team	Apps	(Gls)
2005–2010	River Plate	3	(0)
2008	→ Emelec (loan)	18	(7)
2009	→ Universidad San Martín (loan)	42	(13)
2010–2011	O'Higgins	18	(4)
2011	→ Everton (loan)	8	(0)
2011–2012	Defensores de Belgrano	13	(1)
2012	Manta	8	(0)
2014–2015	Santos de Guápiles	11	(1)
2016–2018	Santamarina	9	(2)

International career
2003	Argentina U17	7	(0)
- * Club domestic league appearances and goals

Gonzalo Emmanuel Raúl Ludueña (Spanish pronunciation: [ɡonˈθalo luˈðweɲa], born 12 March 1986) is an Argentine former professional footballer who played as an attacking midfielder, operating also as a winger.

== Teams ==
- (Argentina) River Plate 2005–2007
- (Ecuador) Emelec 2008
- (Peru) Universidad San Martín 2009
- (Argentina) River Plate 2010
- (Chile) O'Higgins 2010–2011
- (Chile) Everton 2011
- (Argentina) Defensores de Belgrano 2011–2012
- (Ecuador) Manta 2012
- (Costa Rica) Santos de Guápiles 2014–2015
- (Argentina) Santamarina 2016–2018

== Personal life ==
Ludueña comes from a sport family, his father Luis was a well-known defensive midfielder and his brother Daniel, is a successful player in the Mexican league, being the third historic goalscorer of Santos Laguna with 60 goals under of Jared Borgetti and Vicente Vuoso, and also is a close friend of Radamel Falcao.
