= Pedro García (footballer, born 1974) =

Peruvian footballer

Personal information
- Full name: Pedro Alejandro García de la Cruz
- Date of birth: 14 March 1974 (age 52)
- Place of birth: Pisco, Peru
- Height: 1.65 m (5 ft 5 in)
- Positions: Second striker; attacking midfielder

Senior career*
| Years | Team | Apps | (Gls) |
| 1993 | Alianza Lima | 0 | (0) |
| 1994 | América Cochahuayco | 0 | (0) |
| 1995 | Alcides Vigo | 0 | (0) |
| 1996–1999 | Alianza Lima | 56 | (1) |
| 2000 | América Cochahuayco | 0 | (0) |
| 2001–2004 | Alianza Atlético | 107 | (52) |
| 2005–2010 | Universidad San Martín | 217 | (71) |
| 2011 | Universitario de Deportes | 6 | (1) |
| 2012 | León de Huánuco | 20 | (3) |
| 2013 | Alfonso Ugarte | 11 | (3) |
| 2013 | Sport Huancayo | 8 | (0) |
| 2014 | Sport Boys | 14 | (1) |
| Total | | 439 | (132) |

International career
| 2000–2009 | Peru | 19 | (2) |
- * Club domestic league appearances and goals

Pedro Alejandro García de la Cruz (born 14 March 1974) is a Peruvian former professional footballer who played as a second striker or attacking midfielder.

== Club career ==
García was born in Pisco. He played for Universidad San Martín and Universitario de Deportes.

In January 2012, García had his contract with Universitario de Deportes rescinded by the Peruvian Football Federation due to seven months of unpaid wages. He joined León de Huánuco along with former Universitario teammate Johan Vásquez for the start of the 2012 Torneo Descentralizado season.

== International career ==
García made 19 appearances for the Peru national team, including the Copa América 2007.

== Honours ==
Universidad San Martín

- Torneo Descentralizado: 2007, 2008, 2010
