= Martín Arzuaga =

Colombian footballer (born 1981)

Personal information
- Full name: Martín Enrique Arzuaga Coronel
- Date of birth: July 23, 1981 (age 45)
- Place of birth: Becerril, Colombia
- Height: 1.78 m (5 ft 10 in)
- Position: Striker

Senior career*
| Years | Team | Apps | (Gls) |
| 2000 | Atlético Junior | 1 | (0) |
| 2001 | Atlético Bucaramanga | | |
| 2001–2005 | Atlético Junior | 149 | (47) |
| 2005–2006 | Cruz Azul | 0 | (0) |
| 2006 | Veracruz | 15 | (3) |
| 2007 | Godoy Cruz | 18 | (6) |
| 2007–2008 | Rosario Central | 27 | (7) |
| 2008–2009 | Atlético Junior | 11 | (2) |
| 2009 | Universidad San Martín | 20 | (12) |
| 2009 | Juan Aurich | 11 | (0) |
| 2010 | Atlético Junior | 17 | (5) |
| 2010–2011 | Independiente Medellín | 15 | (4) |
| 2012 | José Gálvez | 29 | (12) |
| 2013 | Uniautónoma | 25 | (26) |
| 2013 | América de Cali | 13 | (5) |
| 2014 | Atlético Junior | 16 | (5) |
| 2014 | Uniautónoma | 14 | (2) |
| 2015 | Jaguares de Córdoba | 12 | (8) |
| 2015 | Alianza Petrolera | 16 | (5) |
| 2016 | Real Cartagena | 30 | (13) |
| 2017 | Valledupar | 21 | (7) |

International career
| 2003–2005 | Colombia | 10 | (1) |
- * Club domestic league appearances and goals as of 12 May 2019

Martín Enrique Arzuaga Coronel (born July 23, 1981) is a retired footballer who played as striker.

== Career ==
Arzuaga's previous clubs include Rosario Central of Argentina, CD Veracruz of Mexico and Godoy Cruz of Argentina. He debuted as a professional in Junior in 2000. His penalty-kick shootouts let him win the 2004 Colombian league title with Junior.

=== International goals ===
Scores and results list Colombia's goal tally first.

| No | Date | Venue | Opponent | Score | Result | Competition |
|---|---|---|---|---|---|---|
| 1. | 8 June 2005 | Estadio Metropolitano Roberto Meléndez, Barranquilla, Colombia | Ecuador | 3–0 | 3–0 | 2006 FIFA World Cup qualification |

== Attributes ==
He's nicknamed "Torito de Becerril" (Becerril's Little Bull) in reference to his great leg strength and attacking power.
