= Jorge Huamán =

Peruvian footballer (born 1977)

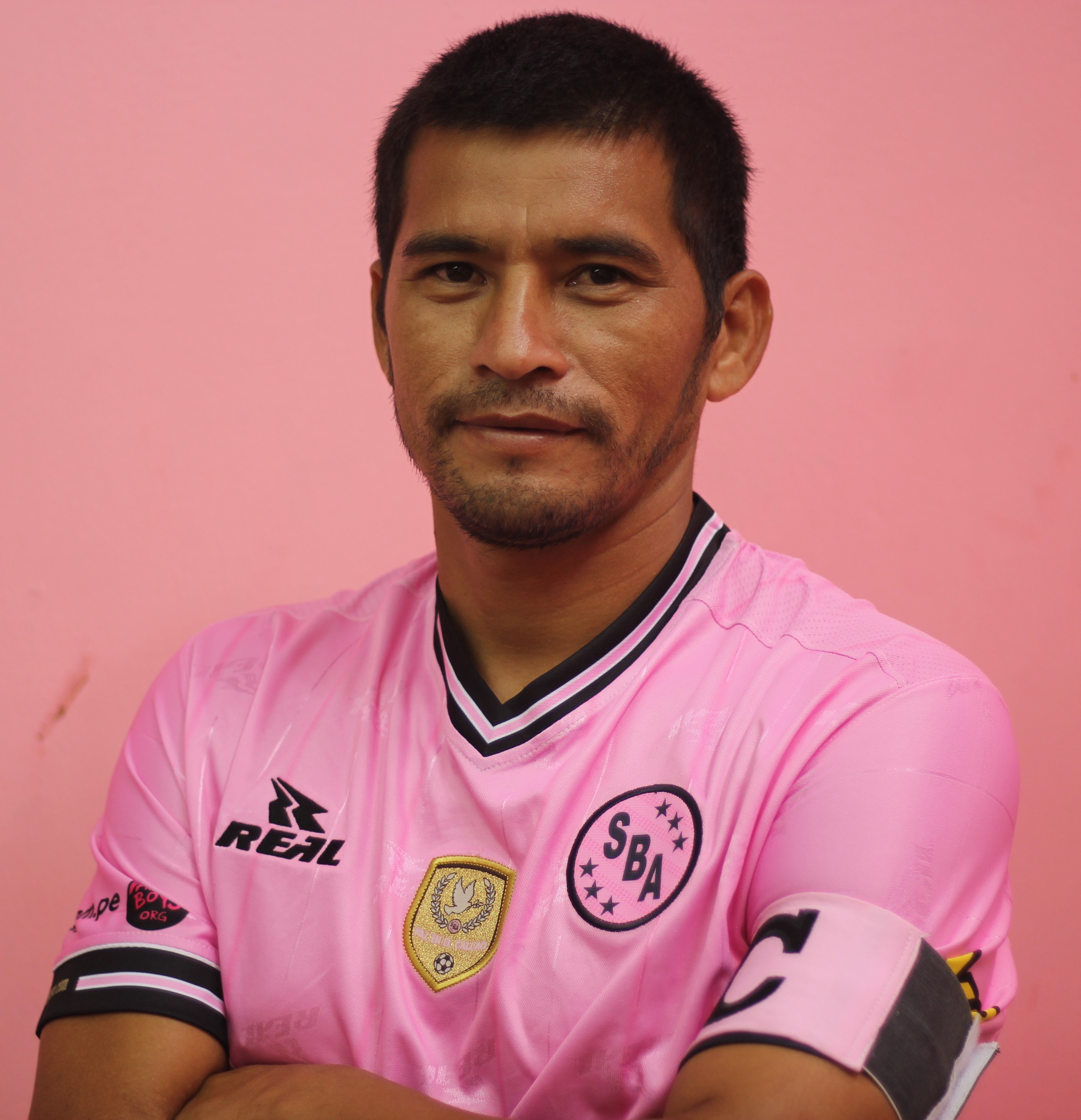
- Huamán with Sport Boys

Personal information
- Full name: Jorge Raúl Huamán Salinas
- Date of birth: 11 April 1977 (age 49)
- Place of birth: Callao, Peru
- Height: 1.71 m (5 ft 7 in)
- Position: Defender

Youth career
- Defensor Callao
- Yo Calidad
- Cantolao
- 1993: Sporting Cristal
- 1994: Sport Boys

Senior career*
Years	Team	Apps	(Gls)
1994–1998	Sport Boys	46	(0)
1999	Veria	20	(0)
2000–2002	Sporting Cristal	63	(2)
2002	Estudiantes de Medicina	21	(1)
2003	Universitario	18	(0)
2003–2004	Alianza Atlético	36	(1)
2004–2011	Universidad San Martín	241	(5)
2012	Sport Boys	40	(0)
2013	UT Cajamarca	4	(0)
2013–2016	Sport Boys	63	(4)

International career
1998–2005	Peru	12	(0)
- * Club domestic league appearances and goals

Jorge Huamán (born 11 April 1977) is a Peruvian former professional footballer who played as a defender.

== Club career ==
Huamán was born in Callao. He played for most of his career with Sport Boys, Sporting Cristal and Universidad San Martín in the Primera División Peruana. He also had a spell with Veria in the Super League Greece.

== International career ==
Huamán made twelve appearances for the senior Peru national team from 1998 to 2005.
