= Mario Flores (Peruvian footballer) =

Peruvian footballer and manager (born 1973)

Mario Jesús Flores Sanguinetti (born 15 October 1973) is a Peruvian football manager and former footballer.

== Managerial career ==
In 2010, Mario Flores was head coach of José Gálvez FBC in the Primera División Peruana. Coach Flores, played for Estudiantes de Medicina, Sport Boys and Universidad San Martín de Porres. In 2009, he coached Sport Ancash.
