= Víctor Rivera (football manager) =

Peruvian football manager (born 1968)

Victor Rivera
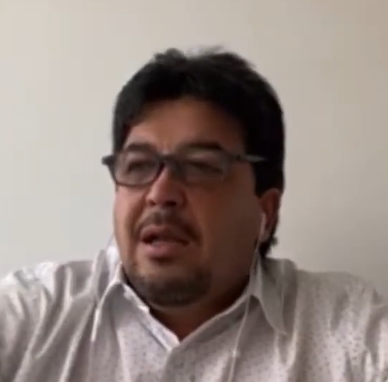
- Rivera in 2022

Personal information
- Full name: Victor Hugo Rivera Coronado
- Date of birth: 10 November 1968 (age 58)
- Place of birth: Lima, Peru

Team information
- Current team: ADT (manager)

Managerial career
- Years: Team
- 1989–1990: AD Cantolao (youth)
- 1991: Peru U17 (assistant)
- 1992: Peru U20 (assistant)
- 1993: Academia Tito Drago (youth)
- 1994: Ciclista Lima (youth)
- 1995: Academia Tito Drago (youth)
- 1996–1997: Peru U17 (assistant)
- 1997–2000: Deportivo Municipal (assistant)
- 2001–2002: Alianza Lima (assistant)
- 2003: La Peña Sporting
- 2004: Deportivo Municipal
- 2005: USMP (caretaker)
- 2006–2009: USMP
- 2010: Sporting Cristal
- 2011–2013: UCV
- 2014–2015: Peru U20
- 2016: Juan Aurich
- 2018–2020: Deportivo Municipal
- 2021: Cienciano
- 2022: USMP
- 2023: Deportivo Coopsol
- 2024: Deportivo Municipal
- 2024–2025: USMP
- 2026–: ADT

Victor Hugo Rivera Coronado, popularly known as "El Chino", (born 10 November 1968) is a Peruvian football manager, currently in charge of ADT.

Rivera previously managed Universidad San Martín de Porres, where he won back-to-back national titles in 2007 and 2008, and Sporting Cristal.

== Profile ==
Born in Lima, Rivera debuted as an interim manager during the end of the 2006 season replacing Juan Antonio Pizzi, who was in charge of Universidad San Martín de Porres. With three matches to close the season, San Martin under Rivera won all three, against Cienciano, Sporting Cristal, and Coronel Bolognesi.

After the 2006 season, the board of Universidad San Martín decided to give him position as manager for the 2007 season. On 27 May 2007, Universidad San Martín beat Cienciano to become Apertura champions. That same year they became national champions for the first time in their short history.

Rivera debuted internationally when Universidad San Martín played in the 2008 Copa Libertadores. They did not manage to pass the first round but left a good impression. That same season they won the Clausura tournament and became national champions again as the Apertura champions, Universitario de Deportes, failed to finish in the top 6 of the Torneo Clausura and thus not creating a play off between both champions.

In 2009, Rivera and Universidad San Martín played in the 2009 Copa Libertadores and passed the first round where they lost against Gremio. During the second stage of the 2009 season, Rivera left Universidad San Martín and was soon after announced by Sporting Cristal that he would replace Juan Carlos Oblitas as manager for the 2010 season.

He left Sporting Cristal after one season to join Universidad César Vallejo. On 1 January 2016, he was appointed manager of Juan Aurich.

== Honours ==
Universidad San Martín

- Peruvian Primera División (2): 2007, 2008
