= Ronald Quinteros =

Peruvian footballer (born 1985)

Personal information
- Full name: Ronald Jonathan Quinteros Sánchez
- Date of birth: June 28, 1985 (age 41)
- Place of birth: Huancayo, Peru
- Height: 1.76 m (5 ft 9 in)
- Position: Winger

Team information
- Current team: César Vallejo
- Number: 23

Youth career
- –2002: Alianza Lima

Senior career*
Years	Team	Apps	(Gls)
2003	Alianza Lima	1	(1)
2005	Deportivo Municipal		
2006	Unión Huaral	14	(1)
2007–2011	Universidad San Martín	130	(25)
2011	Unión de Santa Fe	10	(0)
2012	Universidad San Martín	35	(0)
2013–2017	César Vallejo	125	(13)
2017	Juan Aurich	68	(5)
2017–	César Vallejo	170	(14)

International career
2009–2012	Peru	3	(0)
- * Club domestic league appearances and goals as of 20:22, 19 January 2020 (UTC)

Ronald Jonathan Quinteros Sánchez (born June 28, 1985, in Huancayo, Peru) is a Peruvian footballer. He currently plays for Universidad César Vallejo in the Peruvian Segunda División. He is also the younger brother of Henry Quinteros.

Quinteros was born in Huancayo, the son of Julio Ignacio Quinteros Surco († 2011).

== Club career ==
Ronald Quinteros came out of the youth system of Alianza Lima. He was promoted to the first team in 2003 due to the players' strike. That season manager Julio "Humildad" García allowed him to make his Torneo Descentralizado debut in a 7–1 home win against Estudiantes de Medicina. In the same match Quinteros scored his first goal in the Descentralizado in the 69th minute.

In 2005, he played in the Peruvian Second Division for Deportivo Municipal during the 2005 season.

== Honours ==
=== Club ===
Universidad San Martín

- Torneo Descentralizado: 2007, 2008, 2010
