= 2010 Torneo Descentralizado =

Torneo Descentralizado
- Season: 2010
- Dates: 13 February 2010 – 12 December 2010
- Champions: Universidad San Martín; 3rd Descentralizado title 3rd professional title 3rd Primera División
- Relegated: José Gálvez; Total Chalaco
- Copa Libertadores: Universidad San Martín; León de Huánuco; Alianza Lima
- Copa Sudamericana: Universitario; Juan Aurich; Universidad César Vallejo
- Top goalscorer: Héber Arriola (24 goals)
- Biggest home win: León de Huánuco 6–0 Sporting Cristal (June 13, 2010); Inti Gas 6–0 José Gálvez (November 13, 2010)
- Biggest away win: José Gálvez 2–6 CNI (November 28, 2010)
- Highest scoring: José Gálvez 2–6 CNI (November 28, 2010)

The 2010 Torneo Descentralizado de Fútbol Profesional (known as the 2010 Copa Cable Mágico for sponsorship reasons) was the ninety-fourth season of Association Peruvian football. A total of 16 teams competed in the tournament, with Universitario de Deportes as the defending champion. The season began on February and concluded on December 12 with the victory of Universidad San Martín over León de Huánuco in the second leg of the final Play-off, giving Universidad San Martín its third Peruvian title.

== Competition modus ==
The season was divided into 3 stages. In the first stage the 16 teams played a round-robin home-and-away round for a total of 30 matches each. In the second stage the 16 teams were divided into 2 groups. The 8 teams that ranked an odd number played in the group Liguilla A and the 8 teams that ranked an even number played in Liguilla B. In addition, the team ranked first at the end of the first stage is eligible to play the 2011 Copa Libertadores as Peru 3. Each team carried on their records from the first stage. Both groups played another round-robin home-and-away round for 14 matches played by each team. Bonus points were awarded to two teams based on the performance of their reserve teams in the 2010 Torneo de Promoción y Reserva before the first match of the second stage. The teams ranked first in each group at the end of the 14 matches advanced to the third stage. The two teams with the fewest points at the end of the second stage were relegated. In the third stage the championship was contested in a two-legged Play-off. The Play-off finalists qualified for the Copa Libertadores. The remaining international competition berths were determined by the season aggregate table.

== Changes from 2009 ==
- First stage winner is guaranteed a berth in the first stage of the Copa Libertadores if they finish the season above 9th place on the aggregate table. If they advance to the third stage of the Torneo Descentralizado, they can choose whether to enter the Copa Libertadores in the First stage or Group stage.
- A team can field 4 foreign players and can sign up to 6 foreign players on their squad.
- A separate tournament called Torneo de Promocion y Reserva will be played with reserve players of the 16 teams and the winner of this tournament will award their first division team 2 points and the runner-up will award 1 point to their respective first division team. The points will be added to the senior teams after the Second stage groups have been formed.
- At the end of the second stage, if two teams tie for first place in their group, a match will be played at a neutral venue to determine the winner of the group.

== Teams ==
Sport Áncash and Coronel Bolognesi finished the 2009 season in 15th and 16th place, respectively, in the aggregate table and thus were relegated to the Segunda División. They were replaced by the champion of the 2009 Segunda División, Sport Boys and the champion of the 2009 Copa Perú, León de Huánuco.

=== Team changes ===
Promoted from 2009 Segunda División	Promoted from 2009 Copa Perú	Relegated from 2009 Primera División
▲ Sport Boys (1st)	▲ León de Huánuco (1st)	▼ Sport Áncash (15th) ▼ Coronel Bolognesi (16th)

=== Stadia locations ===
Locations of the 2010 Primera División teams

Team	City	Stadium	Capacity
Alianza Atlético	Sullana	Municipal de La Unión^{[A]}	5,000
Alianza Lima	Lima	Alejandro Villanueva	35,000
Cienciano	Cusco	Garcilaso	40,000
CNI	Iquitos	Max Augustín	24,000
Inti Gas	Ayacucho	Ciudad de Cumaná	15,000
José Gálvez	Chimbote	Manuel Rivera Sánchez	25,000
Juan Aurich	Chiclayo	Elías Aguirre	24,500
León de Huánuco	Huánuco	Heraclio Tapia	15,000
Melgar	Arequipa	Virgen de Chapi	40,217
Sport Boys	Callao	Miguel Grau	17,000
Sport Huancayo	Huancayo	Huancayo	20,000
Sporting Cristal	Lima	San Martín de Porres	18,000
Total Chalaco	Huacho	Segundo Aranda Torres	12,000
Universidad César Vallejo	Trujillo	Mansiche	25,000
Universidad San Martín	Lima	San Martín de Porres	18,000
Universitario	Lima	Monumental	80,093

== First stage ==
=== Standings ===
Pos	Team	Pld	W	D	L	GF	GA	GD	Pts	Second Stage placement
1	Universidad San Martín	30	19	5	6	61	30	+31	62 (Note: Universidad San Martín as first stage winners can choose to enter the Copa Libertadores in the First Stage or the Second Stage if they advance to the play-off.)	Liguilla A
2	León de Huánuco	30	17	5	8	55	31	+24	56	Liguilla B
3	Alianza Lima	30	17	5	8	50	31	+19	56	Liguilla A
4	Universidad César Vallejo	30	16	5	9	48	30	+18	53	Liguilla B
5	Universitario	30	16	5	9	43	22	+21	51 (Note: Universitario were deducted 2 points for failing to pay a former manager Ricardo Gareca.)	Liguilla A
6	Juan Aurich	30	13	9	8	42	31	+11	48	Liguilla B
7	Sporting Cristal	30	12	8	10	43	42	+1	44	Liguilla A
8	Sport Huancayo	30	11	5	14	44	48	−4	38	Liguilla B
9	Inti Gas	30	12	2	16	36	43	−7	38	Liguilla A
10	Melgar	30	9	9	12	38	49	−11	36	Liguilla B
11	CNI	30	10	7	13	39	51	−12	33 (Note: Colegio Nacional Iquitos were deducted 4 points for failing to pay two former players Enrique Ísmodes and Juan Montenegro.)	Liguilla A
12	Cienciano	30	9	6	15	35	50	−15	31 (Note: Cienciano were deducted 2 points for failing to pay a former player.)	Liguilla B
13	Total Chalaco	30	8	8	14	31	43	−12	30 (Note: Total Chalaco were deducted 2 points for failing to pay a former player Percy Manchego.)	Liguilla A
14	Sport Boys	30	8	6	16	34	55	−21	30	Liguilla B
15	José Gálvez	30	6	10	14	19	39	−20	28	Liguilla A
16	Alianza Atlético	30	5	9	16	24	47	−23	24	Liguilla B

Updated to match(es) played on August 29, 2010. Source: Soccerway
Rules for classification: 1) points; 2) goal difference; 3) number of goals scored.

=== Results ===
Home \ Away	AAS	ALI	CIE	CNI	MEL	IGD	JG	JA	LEÓ	SBA	CRI	SHU	TCH	UCV	USM	UNI
Alianza Atlético		1–1 (Note: Played in Estadio Miguel Grau.)	2–1	0–1	1–3	1–1	0–0	2–2	0–1	4–0	0–0	2–1	3–0	1–2	0–3	1–0
Alianza Lima	3–0		2–1	4–1	2–1	1–0	3–2	1–0	4–3	4–1	1–1	4–0	3–1	0–2	2–1	0–0
Cienciano	0–0	2–1		4–0	1–1	2–0	0–3	0–0	2–1	2–0	3–3	2–1	5–2	2–0	1–3	1–1
CNI	3–0	0–4	1–0		5–1	3–0	1–1	0–1	1–1	3–1	1–0	1–1	1–2	2–4	2–2	0–2
Melgar	2–0	4–2	3–0	1–1		2–1	2–0	1–1	0–1	3–3	1–1	1–1	1–1	2–2	1–4 (Note: Played in Municipal de Cayma.)	0–4
Inti Gas	4–1	2–1	3–1	2–0	0–1		2–0	3–0	1–2	2–1	2–1	2–1	2–0	1–2	1–4	2–1
José Gálvez	0–0	0–1	1–0	0–0	1–1	1–0		0–1	0–3 (Note: Game was declared a walkover and a 3–0 loss for José Gálvez.)	2–1	1–1	1–0	1–1	0–3	1–1	0–3
Juan Aurich	3–1	1–1	5–2	1–1	1–0	1–0	3–0		3–2	3–0	2–2	2–0	2–1	2–3	1–1	2–1
León de Huánuco	3–1	1–0	1–0	2–1	3–1	3–0	1–1	1–0		3–1	6–0	5–2	0–1	0–0	4–2	1–0
Sport Boys	0–0	2–1	2–1	2–4	2–0	1–1	2–1	1–0	0–0		1–2	3–1	3–2	2–1	0–1	1–2
Sporting Cristal	2–1	1–0	0–1	5–2	3–1	4–1	1–2	1–1	1–0	1–1		4–1	1–0	0–1	0–4	1–2
Sport Huancayo	2–1	2–0	1–1	4–0	3–0	3–0	1–0	2–1	3–2	3–0	0–1		2–2	1–0	1–2	1–0
Total Chalaco	0–0	0–1	3–0	0–1	1–2	1–0	0–0	1–2	1–0	1–1	1–0	3–2		0–1	2–2	1–3
Universidad César Vallejo	3–0	1–1	5–0	2–0	1–0	1–0	3–0	1–1	1–2	2–1	2–3	3–3	1–2		2–0	0–1
Universidad San Martín	4–0	0–1 (Note: Played in Estadio Miguel Grau.)	3–0	3–1	0–1	2–1	4–0	1–0	3–2	2–1	2–1	2–1	3–1	1–0		1–1
Universitario	2–1	0–1	2–0	1–2	3–1	1–2	1–0	1–0	1–1	3–0	1–2	3–0	0–0	2–0	1–0	

Updated to match(es) played on August 28, 2010. Source: Soccerway
Legend: Blue = home team win; Yellow = draw; Red = away team win.

== Second stage ==
The Second Stage began September. The winner of each Liguilla will qualify for the 2011 Copa Libertadores Second Stage.

=== Liguilla A ===
==== Standings ====
Pos	Team	Pld	W	D	L	GF	GA	GD	Pts	Qualification
1	Universidad San Martín	44	28	7	9	87	39	+48	92 (Note: Universidad San Martin obtained 1 point by being the 2010 Torneo de Promoción y Reserva runner-up.)	Third Stage and the 2011 Copa Libertadores Second Stage
2	Alianza Lima	44	22	12	10	70	48	+22	78	
3	Universitario	44	21	11	12	55	31	+24	72 (Note: Universitario were docked 2 points for failing to pay a former manager Ricardo Gareca.)	
4	Sporting Cristal	44	18	10	16	58	54	+4	64	
5	Inti Gas	44	17	5	22	63	69	−6	56	
6	CNI	44	16	8	20	58	71	−13	52 (Note: Colegio Nacional Iquitos were docked 4 points for failing to pay two former players Enrique Ísmodes and Juan Montenegro.)	
7	José Gálvez	44	10	13	21	31	67	−36	43	
8	Total Chalaco	44	10	12	22	41	64	−23	40 (Note: Total Chalaco were docked 2 points for failing to pay a former player Percy Manchego.)	

Updated to match(es) played on December 5, 2010. Source: Soccerway
Rules for classification: 1) points; 2) goal difference; 3) number of goals scored.

==== Results ====
Home \ Away	ALI	CNI	IGD	JG	CRI	TCH	USM	UNI
Alianza Lima		1–1	3–0	3–1	3–1	2–1	1–1	2–2
CNI	2–0		2–0	1–2	0–2	2–1	0–1	1–0
Inti Gas	2–2	5–0		6–0	1–3	2–1	2–1	1–0
José Gálvez	1–1	2–6	3–2		1–0	1–0	0–0	0–1
Sporting Cristal	0–1	1–0	4–2	2–0		0–1	0–1	0–0
Total Chalaco	1–1	0–2	2–2	0–0	0–1		1–5	0–0
Universidad San Martín	4–0	3–1	4–1	3–0	1–0	1–2		1–0
Universitario	0–0	2–1	1–1	3–1	1–1	1–0	1–0	

Updated to match(es) played on December 3, 2010. Source: RSSSF
Legend: Blue = home team win; Yellow = draw; Red = away team win.

=== Liguilla B ===
==== Standings ====
Pos	Team	Pld	W	D	L	GF	GA	GD	Pts	Qualification
1	León de Huánuco	44	24	9	11	77	44	+33	81	Third Stage and the 2011 Copa Libertadores Second Stage
2	Universidad César Vallejo	44	19	11	14	64	48	+16	70 (Note: Universidad César Vallejo obtained 2 points by being the 2010 Torneo de Promoción y Reserva champion.)	
3	Juan Aurich	44	19	11	14	62	47	+15	68	
4	Sport Huancayo	44	17	8	19	64	60	+4	59	
5	Sport Boys	44	15	8	21	54	78	−24	53	
6	Melgar	44	13	11	20	53	72	−19	50	
7	Cienciano	44	13	10	21	50	69	−19	47 (Note: Cienciano were docked 2 points for failing to pay a former player.)	
8	Alianza Atlético	44	10	14	20	45	71	−26	44	

Updated to match(es) played on December 5, 2010. Source: Soccerway
Rules for classification: 1) points; 2) goal difference; 3) number of goals scored.

==== Results ====
Home \ Away	AAS	CIE	MEL	JA	LEÓ	SBA	SHU	UCV
Alianza Atlético		2–0	1–1	1–0	2–1	2–0	0–0	1–4
Cienciano	2–1		0–1	3–0	1–2	2–1	0–3	0–0
Melgar	3–3	2–1		0–2	1–2	1–2	2–0	2–0
Juan Aurich	1–3	2–3	2–0		1–0	4–1	3–1	3–0
León de Huánuco	3–1	0–0	3–1	1–1		4–0	2–0	1–1
Sport Boys	2–2	2–0	2–1	2–1	3–1		0–2	2–1
Sport Huancayo	5–0	2–2	3–0	2–0	0–0	0–1		1–0
Universidad César Vallejo	2–2	1–1	2–0	0–0	1–2	2–2	2–1	

Updated to match(es) played on December 5, 2010. Source: RSSSF
Legend: Blue = home team win; Yellow = draw; Red = away team win.

== Third stage ==
The Third Stage will be the finals (also known as the Play-off) of the 2010 season between the winners of each group of the Second Stage. They will be played in December. The group winner with the most points on the aggregate table chooses which leg they will play as the home team. They will also choose the venue of the third match in case both teams are tied on points after the second leg.

December 8, 2010
13:30 UTC-5

León de Huánuco	1 – 1	Universidad San Martín
Zegarra 52'	Report	Alemanno 90+3'

Heraclio Tapia
Attendance: 18,090
Referee: Manuel Garay

December 12, 2010
15:30 UTC-5

Universidad San Martín	2 – 1	León de Huánuco
García 15', Vitti 25'	Report	Perea 28'

Monumental
Attendance: 35,768
Referee: Victor Hugo Rivera

== Aggregate table ==
The aggregate table will determine the three teams who qualify to the 2011 Copa Sudamericana, and the two teams to be relegated to the Segunda División. The aggregate table consists of the points earned in the First and Second stages.

Pos	Team	Pld	W	D	L	GF	GA	GD	Pts	Qualification or relegation
1	Universidad San Martín (C)	44	28	7	9	87	39	+48	92 (Note: Universidad San Martin obtained 1 point by being the 2010 Torneo de Promoción y Reserva runner-up.)	2011 Copa Libertadores Second Stage (Note: Universidad San Martin and León de Huánuco have qualified for the 2011 Copa Libertadores by winning their respective second stage groups.)
2	León de Huánuco	44	24	9	11	77	44	+33	81	2011 Copa Libertadores Second Stage
3	Alianza Lima	44	22	12	10	70	49	+21	78	2011 Copa Libertadores First Stage
4	Universitario	44	21	11	12	55	31	+24	72 (Note: Universitario were docked 2 points for failing to pay a former manager Ricardo Gareca.)	2011 Copa Sudamericana Second Stage
5	Universidad César Vallejo	44	19	11	14	64	48	+16	70 (Note: Universidad César Vallejo obtained 2 points by being the 2010 Torneo de Promoción y Reserva champion.)	2011 Copa Sudamericana First Stage
6	Juan Aurich	44	19	11	14	62	48	+14	68	2011 Copa Sudamericana First Stage
7	Sporting Cristal	44	18	10	16	58	54	+4	64	
8	Sport Huancayo	44	17	8	19	64	60	+4	59	
9	Inti Gas	44	17	5	22	63	69	−6	56	
10	Sport Boys	44	15	8	21	54	78	−24	53	
11	CNI	44	16	8	20	58	71	−13	52 (Note: Deducted points restored by ADFP before start of Round 31.)	
12	Melgar	44	13	11	20	53	72	−19	50	
13	Cienciano	44	13	10	21	50	69	−19	47 (Note: Cienciano were docked 2 points for failing to pay a former player.)	
14	Alianza Atlético	44	10	14	20	45	71	−26	44	
15	José Gálvez (R)	44	10	13	21	31	67	−36	43	2011 Segunda División
16	Total Chalaco (R)	44	10	12	22	41	64	−23	40 (Note: Total Chalaco were docked 2 points for failing to pay a former player Percy Manchego.)	2011 Segunda División

Updated to match(es) played on December 5, 2010. Source: Soccerway
Rules for classification: 1) points; 2) goal difference; 3) number of goals scored.
(C) Champions; (R) Relegated

== Top goalscorers ==
Pos	Player	Player nationality	Club	Goals
1	Héber Arriola	Argentine	Universidad San Martín	24
2	Luis Alberto Perea	Colombian	León de Huánuco	22
3	Sergio Almirón	Argentine	CNI	21
3	Leonardo Mina Polo	Colombian	Inti Gas	21
5	Miguel Ximénez	Uruguayan	Sporting Cristal	19
6	Irvin Ávila	Peruvian	Sport Huancayo	17
7	Luis Tejada	Panamanian	Juan Aurich	16
7	Germán Alemanno	Argentine	Universidad San Martín	16
9	Ricardo Ciciliano	Colombian	Juan Aurich	15
9	Franco Mendoza	Argentine	Total Chalaco	15

== See also ==
- 2010 Peruvian Segunda División
- 2010 Copa Perú
- 2010 Torneo de Promoción y Reserva

== Footnotes ==
A. Alianza Atlético's regular venue is undergoing renovations.
