= Sergio Almirón (footballer, born 1985) =

Argentine footballer

Personal information
- Full name: Sergio Oscar Almirón
- Date of birth: 20 September 1985 (age 41)
- Place of birth: San Nicolás de los Arroyos, Argentina
- Height: 1.88 m (6 ft 2 in)
- Position: Forward

Team information
- Current team: UTC
- Number: 9

Senior career*
Years	Team	Apps	(Gls)
2006–2008	12 de Octubre		
2009–2010	Provincial Osorno	18	(14)
2010–2011	Colegio Nacional Iquitos	32	(21)
2011	Newell's Old Boys	11	(1)
2011–2012	Olimpia	13	(4)
2012–2013	León de Huánuco	16	(5)
2013	José Gálvez FBC	16	(6)
2014–2015	Blooming	57	(24)
2015–2016	Oriente Petrolero	38	(21)
2016	Atlético de Rafaela	3	(0)
2017	Atlético Huila	28	(11)
2018	Deportivo Táchira	10	(1)
2018–2019	Ontinyent CF	5	(0)
2019–	UTC	4	(1)
- * Club domestic league appearances and goals as of 21 March 2019

Sergio Oscar Almirón (born 20 September 1985) is an Argentine footballer who plays as a forward for Torneo Descentralizado side UTC.

== Career ==
=== Club ===
Almirón has played football in Paraguay, Chile, Peru, Argentina, Bolivia and Colombia during his career. He began in Paraguay with 12 de Octubre in 2006, before spells with Provincial Osorno, Colegio Nacional Iquitos and Newell's Old Boys in Chile, Peru and Argentina respectively before returning to Paraguay to join Olimpia in 2011 where he won the 2011 Paraguayan Primera División Clausura. Between 2012 and 2013, Almirón played for León de Huánuco and José Gálvez FBC in the Peruvian Primera División and made a total of 32 appearances and scored 11 goals.

2014 saw Almirón enter Bolivian football for the first time as he joined Liga de Fútbol Profesional Boliviano team Blooming. After two campaigns with Blooming and 24 goals in 57 games, Almirón left the club to join fellow top-flight Bolivian side Oriente Petrolero. He scored 21 goals in 38 matches for Oriente Petrolero. In September 2016, Almirón joined Argentine Primera División team Atlético de Rafaela. However, after just three appearances in 2016–17 he left at the end of 2016 and subsequently went to Categoría Primera A side Atlético Huila in Colombia in 2017.

== Career statistics ==
=== Club ===
As of 15 January 2017.

Club statistics
Club	Season	League			Cup (Note: Includes the Copa Colombia.)		League Cup		Continental		Other		Total	
Club	Season	Division	Apps	Goals	Apps	Goals	Apps	Goals	Apps	Goals	Apps	Goals	Apps	Goals
Atlético Huila	2017	Categoría Primera A	0	0	0	0	—		—		0	0	0	0
Atlético Huila	Total		0	0	0	0	—		—		0	0	0	0
Career total			0	0	0	0	—		—		0	0	0	0

== Honours ==
=== Club ===
Olimpia

- Paraguayan Primera División (1) 2011 Clausura
