= José Luis Díaz (footballer, born 1974) =

Argentine footballer

Personal information
- Full name: José Luis Díaz Sulca
- Date of birth: 28 July 1974 (age 52)
- Place of birth: Buenos Aires, Argentina
- Height: 1.79 m (5 ft 10 in)
- Position: Midfielder

Youth career
- Deportivo Laferrere

Senior career*
Years	Team	Apps	(Gls)
1990–1995	Deportivo Laferrere	69	(8)
1995	Deportivo Mandiyú	10	(1)
1996–1998	Provincial Osorno	74	(25)
1999	Audax Italiano	40	(23)
2000	Unión Española	28	(12)
2001	Universidad Católica	25	(10)
2002–2007	Cobreloa	173	(88)
2004	→ Tianjin TEDA (loan)	7	(0)
2008–2009	Universidad San Martín	68	(20)
2010	Rangers	0	(0)
2010–2011	Deportivo Laferrere	20	(1)
2012	Cobreloa	25	(2)
2013–2014	Racing de Córdoba	28	(0)
2014	Liniers	17	(1)
2015	Sacachispas	18	(0)
Total		602	(191)
- * Club domestic league appearances and goals

José Luis Díaz Sulca (born 28 July 1974) is an Argentine former professional footballer.

== Club career ==
In 1996, Diaz migrated to Chile and has spent the majority of his career playing in that country. However, he did spend one season playing with the Chinese team Tianjin Teda before returning to Cobreloa. After spending time with several different teams, Díaz found success with Cobreloa in Apertura 2007, scoring 15 goals.

His last club was Sacachispas in the 2015 Primera C.

== Personal life ==
His daughter, Juliana, is an Argentine influencer and a supporter of Cobreloa.

== Honours ==
Cobreloa

- Primera División de Chile (3): 2003 Apertura, 2003 Clausura, 2004 Clausura
