= Héber Arriola =

Argentine footballer (born 1980)

Personal information
- Full name: Héber Alberto Arriola
- Date of birth: August 14, 1980 (age 46)
- Place of birth: Buenos Aires, Argentina
- Height: 1.88 m (6 ft 2 in)
- Position: Forward

Team information
- Current team: Boca Unidos

Senior career*
Years	Team	Apps	(Gls)
2000–01	Deportivo Español		
2001–02	C.S. Marítimo		
2002	CD Badajoz		
2003–04	All Boys		
2004–05	Tigre		
2005–06	Nacional	27	(4)
2006–07	Olimpia		
2007–09	Nacional	30	(7)
2010–	Universidad San Martín	36	(24)
- * Club domestic league appearances and goals as of 15:43, 10 December 2010 (UTC)

Héber Alberto Arriola (born 14 August 1980) is an Argentine football forward who plays for Boca Unidos of the Primera B Nacional in Argentina.

== Career ==
Arriola began his playing career in 2000 with Deportivo Español in the Argentine 3rd division.

In 2001, he moved to Europe where he played for C.S. Marítimo of Portugal and CD Badajoz of Spain.

In 2003, he returned to Argentina to play for All Boys back in the 3rd division, the following season he joined Tigre where he was a key player in the team that won the Apertura 2004 and Clausura 2005 tournaments and promotion to the 2nd division.

Arriola was then signed by Paraguayan Primera División side Nacional in 2005, he joined Olimpia in 2006 but returned to Nacional in 2007. He was part of the squad that won the 2009 Clausura tournament.

In 2010, he joined Universidad San Martín of the Peruvian Primera División and is the top scorer in the league with only one game left of the season.

== Titles ==
Tigre

- Primera B Metropolitana: Apertura 2004, Clausura 2005

Nacional

- Paraguayan Primera Division: Clausura 2009
