= Roberto Silva (Peruvian footballer) =

Peruvian footballer (born 1976)

Personal information
- Full name: Roberto Enrique Silva Pro
- Date of birth: 1 June 1976 (age 50)
- Place of birth: Lima, Peru
- Height: 1.91 m (6 ft 3 in)
- Position: Forward

Youth career
- Deportivo Zúñiga
- Alianza Lima

Senior career*
Years	Team	Apps	(Gls)
1997–1998	Alianza Lima	29	(6)
1999–2001	Sporting Cristal	76	(31)
2001–2002	Werder Bremen	6	(0)
2002	Unión de Santa Fe	15	(4)
2003	San Luis	33	(9)
2004	Alianza Lima	18	(5)
2004	→ Caracas FC (loan)	15	(3)
2005	Cienciano	20	(4)
2005	Delfines de Coatzacoalcos	19	(6)
2006	Cienciano	14	(3)
2006–2007	Alianza Lima	34	(7)
2007–2008	Universidad San Martín	15	(3)
2008	Universidad Católica	10	(5)
2008–2011	Universidad San Martín	26	(7)
2012	Sport Boys	5	(0)
Total		335	(93)

International career
2001–2004	Peru	11	(2)
- * Club domestic league appearances and goals

Roberto Enrique Silva Pro (born 1 June 1976) is a Peruvian former professional football forward. Apart from one season in the Bundesliga for SV Werder Bremen, he spent most of his career in his native Peru and other American countries.

== Club career ==
In his only spell outside of the Americas he played six matches for SV Werder Bremen in the 2001–2002 Bundesliga season.

== International career ==
Roberto Silva made eleven appearances for Peru from 2001 to 2004 and scored 2 goals.

== Personal life ==
He was quoted in an interview regarding homosexuality in football, saying "I have suspicions that there are some gays in football. Sometimes you can't help but wonder about it. I am not a gay, but if I was, or if I was a woman, which is similar, I would do David Beckham. But that's just my individual opinion."
