= Germán Alemanno =

Argentine footballer (born 1983)

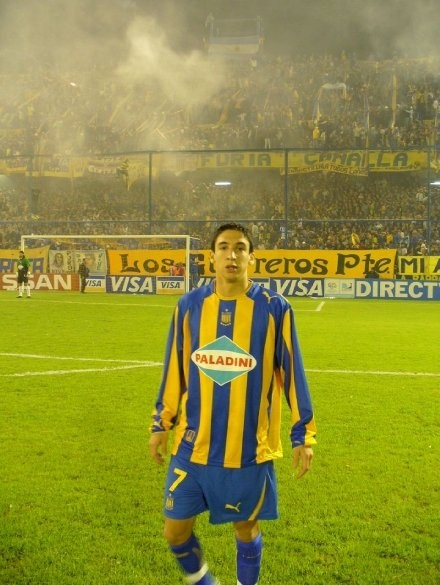

Personal information
- Full name: Germán Ariel Alemanno
- Date of birth: 27 September 1983 (age 43)
- Place of birth: Rosario, Santa Fe, Argentina
- Height: 1.78 m (5 ft 10 in)
- Position: Striker

Senior career*
Years	Team	Apps	(Gls)
2004–2009	Rosario Central	62	(5)
2007–2008	→ Quilmes (loan)	46	(7)
2009	→ Platense (loan)	14	(2)
2009–2012	Universidad San Martín	82	(31)
2012	→ Querétaro (loan)	12	(1)
2012	→ Cerro Porteño (loan)	1	(0)
2013–2014	Universidad César Vallejo	41	(18)
2014–2015	Universitario de Deportes	54	(10)
2017–2018	Deportivo Coopsol	33	(7)
- * Club domestic league appearances and goals as of 17 March 2015

Germán Ariel Alemanno (born 27 September 1983 in Rosario) is a former Argentine football player who last played for Deportivo Coopsol in the Peruvian Segunda División.

Alemanno began his career with Rosario Central, making his debut against Banfield on 13 November 2004.

During his career he was loaned to Quilmes, and Platense. In August 2009, he moved to Peruvian side Universidad San Martín where he established himself as a local legend.
