= University of San Martín de Porres =

Private nonprofit university in Lima, Peru

Coordinates: 12.0454°S 76.9700°W

- Universidad de San Martín de Porres
- Motto: Veritas Liberabit Vos
- Motto in English: the truth shall set you free
- Type: Private
- Established: May 17, 1962
- Affiliations: European Council for Business Education; Accreditation Council for Business Schools and Programs; Pacific Alliance
- Rector: Jose Antonio Chang Escobedo
- Students: 55,000 (2017)
- Location: Jr. Las Calandrias N° 151 Santa Anita, Lima
- Campus: Lima Chiclayo (North Branch) Arequipa (South Branch)
- Colors: White; Black
- Website: www.usmp.edu.pe

The University of San Martin de Porres (USMP) is a private nonprofit university located in the city of Lima, Peru. It was founded by the Dominican Order of the Catholic Church in 1962.

== History ==
=== The Dominican foundation: Pro Deo ===
The University of Saint Martin de Porres began as a subsidiary of the Istituto di Studi Superiori Pro Deo, an organization founded in 1946 in Rome by father Felix Andrew Morlion and monsignor Antonio de Angelis. In those years there was a great promotion of the values of the universal church and, following this trend in Peru, this Pro Deo Institute would be constituted in 1952 under the auspices of the Dominican Order as an institute of social philosophical studies, where journalism, education and philosophy courses were taken. The first classes took place in the Rosario Convent of Lima, specifically in the section corresponding to the old apostolic college, and in charge of it was father Vicente Sanchez Valer O.P.

The objective was to educate the youth in the Christian social doctrine to check the advance of Marxism in the Peruvian university panorama. A non-profit civil association was integrated, called the Peruvian Institute of Social Philosophical Studies. The mission of IPEFS was to found a Catholic-oriented university.

The ministry of education would legally recognize the Institute of Social Philosophical Studies on April 26, 1960 through Ministerial Resolution No. 5733. The institute began its official operation on May 2, 1960 with 113 students: 73 men and 40 ladies in detail. During this stage education was totally free, for that reason teachers and administrative staff worked without remuneration as collaborators.

On November 5, 1961, the president of the republic, Manuel Prado Ugarteche, visited the Rosario convent where a solemn mass was held in honor of the then Blessed Friar Martin de Porres. The president was accompanied by Pedro Beltrán Espantoso, president of the Council of Ministers; the auxiliary bishop of Lima, monsignor Mario Cornejo; the First Lady, Clorinda Málaga de Prado and two ladies of company. Father Vicente Sánchez Valer invited both authorities, as his companions, to enter the classrooms of the new institute. Sanchez Valer took the opportunity to expose the importance of founding a university that honors the name of a beatified. After that, Manuel Prado would commit to trying to help in any way he could.

The session of the associate members of the IPEFS on February 2, 1962 would prove to be of vital importance. Here it would be agreed to ask the government for the elevation of its academic entity, the Institute of Philosophical and Social Studies (IEFS), as a private university according to the current university law. For this the partners session decided: the establishment of the statutory bases of the future university, the election of a rector, a charge that would fall on the director of the IEFS, father Vicente Sánchez Valer, and a higher council of studies was appointed. A special patronage presided over by Pedro Roselló Truel would also be important to achieve the objective. This board had to raise 1,500,000 soles for the constitution of the university, a task that was finally achieved.

=== Expropriation of the university in 1969 ===
The revolutionary government, established by a coup d'etat of Juan Velasco Alvarado, would expropriate the university of San Martin de Porres to the Order of Santo Domingo, by the decree law 17437 of January 18, 1969. Despite recognizing the Dominicans as founding entity, the ownership and administration of the new university would be delivered to the university community. The participation of the religious order would be reduced to only 3 representatives in the Assembly of the University Council, although the rector and vice chancellor at the time were still Dominicans.

=== Development and expansion ===
Apart from any controversy about university policy, it was during the rector of José Antonio Chang Escobedo that the university of San Martin de Porres would achieve internal stability. Thanks to that, the university began a process that allowed it to improve its infrastructure and general equipment. In 2006 a whole campus was inaugurated in Chiclayo, with the objective of combating the educational centralism of Lima. The president of the republic, Alan García Pérez, attended the ceremony; the bishop of the diocese of Chiclayo, Jesús Molinel La Barca and the president of the Lambayeque region, Yehude Simon Munaro.

== Structure ==
Its headquarters are located at the campus of Santa Anita which houses the faculty of administrative sciences and human resources, the faculty of accounting, economic and financial sciences and the faculty of dentistry. The faculty of human medicine, faculty of engineering and architecture and the faculty of law is located in the district of La Molina. The faculty of communication sciences, tourism and psychology is located in the district of Surquillo. The school of obstetrics and nursing is located in the Jesus Maria district, and a dental clinic owned by the university is located in the district of San Luis. The USMP has four language centers in the city of Lima, located in the districts of Jesus Maria, Santa Anita, San Isidro and Pueblo Libre. It also has an art institute and a government institute located in the district of Miraflores.

== See also ==
- Club Deportivo Universidad de San Martín de Porres
- CV Universidad de San Martín de Porres

== Bibliography ==
- Tauro del Pino, Alberto: Enciclopedia Ilustrada del Perú. Third edition. Vol. 16. TAB/UYU. Lima, PEISA, 2001. ISBN 9972-40-165-0
