= List of Peruvian football national cups =

Since the creation of the first league in 1912, several official cups have been played in Peru apart from the main competition, the Primera División championship. The first cup held in the country was the Copa de Campeones del Perú; launched in 1919.

== List of cup competitions ==
Throughout the history of Peruvian football, tournaments have been divided into a few stages or have employed filler tournaments played alongside the Descentralizado due to the Peru national football team's compromises, be it FIFA World Cup qualification, FIFA World Cup participation, or Copa América.

Keys

- LPF = Liga Peruana de Football
- FPF = Federación Peruana de Fútbol
- ADFP = Asociación Deportiva de Fútbol Profesional

=== National Cups ===
Season	Cup	Champion	Runner-up	Award
1928	Torneo Interligas	Alianza Lima	Liga de Balnearios del Sur	None
1928	Copa Uruguay	Armada Nacional	Liga de Balnearios del Sur	Qualified for 1928 Campeonato Nacional
1931–32	Copa Uruguay	Escuela de Hidroaviación	Alianza Frigorífico	None
1970	Copa Presidente de la República	Universitario de Deportes	Melgar	None
1993	Torneo Intermedio	Deportivo Municipal	Deportivo Sipesa	Qualified for 1994 Copa CONMEBOL
2011	Copa del Inca	José Gálvez	Sport Áncash	Qualified for 2012 Copa Federación
2014	Torneo del Inca	Alianza Lima	Universidad San Martín	Qualified for 2015 Copa Libertadores
2015	Torneo del Inca	Universidad César Vallejo	Alianza Lima	Qualified for 2015 Torneo Descentralizado Semifinals
2019	Copa Bicentenario	Atlético Grau	Sport Huancayo	Qualified for 2020 Copa Sudamericana
2021	Copa Bicentenario	Sporting Cristal	Carlos A. Mannucci	Qualified for 2022 Copa Sudamericana
2026	Copa de la Liga	Sporting Cristal	Alianza Atlético	Qualified for 2027 Recopa Peruana and 2 bonus points for the 2027 season

=== Supercups ===
Season	Cup	Champion	Runner-up	Award
1919	Copa de Campeones del Perú	Sport Alianza	Jorge Chávez N°1	None
2012	Copa Federación	José Gálvez	Juan Aurich	None
2018	Supercopa Movistar (ADFP)	Alianza Lima	Sport Boys	None
2020	Supercopa Peruana	Atlético Grau	Binacional	None
2027	Recopa Peruana			None

== Cups by club ==
Rank	Club	Titles	Winning years
1	Alianza Lima	4	Copa de Campeones del Perú: 1919; Torneo Interligas: 1928; Torneo del Inca: 2014; Supercopa Movistar (ADFP): 2018
2	Atlético Grau	2	Copa Bicentenario: 2019; Supercopa Peruana: 2020
2	Escuela de Hidroaviación / Armada Nacional	2	Copa Uruguay: 1928, 1931–32
2	José Gálvez	2	Torneo Intermedio: 2011; Copa Federación: 2012
2	Sporting Cristal	2	Copa Bicentenario: 2021; Copa de la Liga: 2026
6	Deportivo Municipal	1	Torneo Intermedio: 1993
6	Universidad César Vallejo	1	Torneo del Inca: 2015
6	Universitario de Deportes	1	Copa Presidente de la República: 1970
