= 2026 Sporting Cristal season =

Football league season

Sporting Cristal
2026 season
- Stadium: Alberto Gallardo, Lima
- Liga 1: Tornel Apertura: Twelfth (12°); Tornel Clausura: To be defined Aggregate Table: To be defined To be defined
- Copa de la Liga: Group Stage: First (1°) (Group J); Final Copa de la Liga
- Copa Libertadores: Group stage
- Copa Sudamericana: Knockout round play-offs
Home colours	Away colours	Third colours

The 2026 Sporting Cristal season were the Seventy-First (71.º) of the club from its foundation in 1955, Seventy-One (71) participations consecutives in the top-flight of Peruvian Primera División (of 110 Editions) with denomination last Liga 1. In Previous Season the club qualified as 3rd Place of the 2025 Liga 1.

Sporting Cristal were a of eighteen (18) clubs in the Eighth edition (8.º) Liga 1, the competition most important of the Peruvian football. The club played the Peruvian Primera División, Copa Libertadores for Forty-First (41st) Time and Copa Sudamericana for Fifth (5th) Time.

== Liga 1 ==
=== Torneo Apertura ===
Pos	Team	Pld	W	D	L	GF	GA	GD	Pts
11	Sport Boys	17	5	5	7	15	19	-4	20
12	Sporting Cristal	17	5	4	8	28	30	-2	19
13	Deportivo Moquegua	17	5	3	9	17	24	-7	18

== See also ==
- Club Sporting Cristal
- 2026 Liga 1
- 2026 Copa de la Liga
