= Peruvian Football Federation =

Governing body of association football in Peru

CONMEBOL
- Founded: 1922; 104 years ago
- Headquarters: Aviación Avenue 2085, San Luis, Lima, Peru
- FIFA affiliation: 1924
- CONMEBOL affiliation: 1925
- President: Agustín Lozano
- Website: fpf.org.pe

The Peruvian Football Federation (Spanish: Federación Peruana de Fútbol or FPF) is the body that governs Association football in Peru. It was founded on August 23, 1922, and affiliated with FIFA in 1924. It is a member of CONMEBOL since 1925, and directly oversees the Peru national football team, futsal team youth teams, Peruvian Primera División, and the amateur leagues. The Peruvian National football team has won two Copa Américas, six Bolivarian Games titles and qualified for the FIFA World Cup five times.

It is indirectly involved in the organization of the Primera División (today Liga 1), the Liga Femenina, Liga 2, Liga 3, Copa Perú, Copa de la Liga and others. It is headquartered in the Villa Deportiva Nacional (VIDENA) on Aviación Avenue 2085 in San Luis, Lima, which is also the training center of most Peruvian sports federations.

== Association staff ==
Name	Position	Source
(Peru) Agustín Lozano	President	
(Peru) Lander Aleman	1st Vice President	
(Peru) Luis Duarte Plata	2nd Vice President	
(Peru) Claudio Limaylla	Executive	
(Peru) Osías Ramírez	Executive	
(Peru) Freddy Ames	Executive	
(Peru) Raúl Lozano	Executive	
(Peru) Farid Awad	Executive	
(Peru) Franklin Chuquizuta	Executive	
(Peru) Juan Ricketts	Executive	
(Peru) Gabriela Marchinares	Executive	
(Brazil) Mano Menezes	Team Coach (Men's)	
(Argentina) Antonio Spinelli	Team Coach (Women's)	

== Competitions ==
=== Men's football ===
The list of official competitions organized by the Peruvian Football Federation since its creation in 1922 are:

Current competitions
Name	Organised
Liga 1	1926–present
Liga 2	1943–present
Liga 3	2025–present
Copa Perú	1967–present
Ligas Departamentales	Variable–present
Ligas Provinciales	Variable–present
Ligas Distritales	Variable–present
Copa de la Liga	2025–present
Defunct competitions
Ligas Provinciales de Lima y Callao	1926–1975
División Intermedia	1926–1940
Torneo Interligas	1928
Copa Uruguay	1928–1932
Campeonato Nacional	1928–1980
Primera División Regional de Lima y Callao	1941–1950
Segunda División Regional de Lima y Callao	1942–1950
Tercera División Regional de Lima y Callao	1941–1950
Liguilla de Ascenso a Segunda División	1954–1973
Copa Presidente de la República	1970
Reclasificatorio Regional	1974
Liga Mayor de Fútbol de Lima	1976–1986
Región IX Metropolitana	1976–1991
Intermedia	1984–1987
Región Promocional de Lima y Callao	1992–1996
Torneo Zonal	1992
Torneo Intermedio	1993
Ligas Superiores	2004–2023
Torneo del Inca	2011, 2014–2015
Copa Federación	2012
Cuadrangular de Ascenso	2018–2019
Copa Bicentenario	2019–2021
Supercopa Peruana	2020

=== Women's football ===
Current competitions
Name	Organised
Liga Femenina	1996–present
Liga de Ascenso Femenina	2022–present

=== Youth ===
Current competitions
Name	Organised
Liga Sub-18	2025–present
Defunct competitions
Torneo de Promoción y Reserva	2010–2024
Copa Generación	2021

=== Men's Futsal ===
Current competitions
Name	Organised
Futsal Pro: Primera División	2002–present
División Superior	2002–present

=== Women's Futsal ===
Current competitions
Name	Organised
Liga Futsal Pro: Primera División	2014–present

== List of presidents ==
Period	Name
1922–1925	Claudio Martínez Bodero
1926	Guillermo Amesquita
1927	Alejandro Garland
1928	León M. Vega
1928	Eladio Lanatta
1929	Federico Fernandini
1930	Gastón Basadre
1930–1931	Ricardo Guzmán Marquina
1931	Gastón Basadre
1932–1933	Manuel Mujica Gallo
1933–1936	Luis Picasso Rodríguez
1936–1937	Claudio Martínez Bodero
1938–1939	Luis Marrou Correa
1939–1941	Luis Vásquez Benavides
1941–1942	Alejandro Valdivia
1942	Guillermo Garavito
1943	Humberto Meza
1943–1948	Juan Bromley
1948–1952	Leoncio Gómez Ruiz
1952	Augusto Montes
1952–1953	Juan Escudero Villar
1953	Miguel Marticorrena
1953–1954	Pablo Jhery Camino
1954	José Merino Reyba
1954–1955	Luis Razetto
1956	Enrique Velásquez Villavicencio
1956–1959	José Salom Maúrtua
1959–1960	Nicanor Arteaga Domínguez
1961	Jorge Barreto Alván
1962–1964	Teófilo Salinas Fuller
1965	Andrés Dianderas
1966–1970	Gustavo Escudero Molina
1970–1973	José Salom Maúrtua
1973–1975	Luciano Cúneo Marsini
1975–1976	Miguel Pelnny Guardia
1976–1977	Manuel Monasi
1977–1978	Álvaro Valdivia Aspiazú
1979	Augusto Ciccia
1980–1983	Alberto Espantoso Pérez
1983–1984	Luis Vargas Hornes
1985	Jorge Quiroz Castro
1985–1987	Oswaldo Ramírez
1987–1991	Josué Grande Fernández
1992	Manuel Burga Seoane
1992	Walter Indacochea Queirolo
1992–2002	Nicolás Delfino
2002–2015	Manuel Burga Seoane
2015–2018	Edwin Oviedo
2018–	Agustín Lozano

== Sponsorships ==
=== Current ===
- Adidas
- BCP
- Big Cola
- Cerveza Cristal
- Claro
- GVM
- Repsol
- Sky Airline
- Te Apuesto
- Yape

=== Previous ===
- BBVA Perú
- Bitci.com
- Coca-Cola
- Derco
- Diadora
- DoradoBet
- Gloria
- Hunter
- Hyundai Motor Company
- LATAM Airlines Perú
- Lavaggi
- Lenovo
- Marathon Perú
- Mobil
- Movistar/Integratel
- Nescafé
- Nestlé Milo
- Panini
- Pecsa
- PedidosYa
- Petroperú
- Polmer
- Power
- Tommy Hilfiger
- Umbro
- Walon

== See also ==
- Football in Peru
- Peru national football team
- Peru Olympic football team
- Peru national under-20 football team
- Peru national under-17 football team
- Peru women's national football team
- Peru women's national under-20 football team
- Peru national futsal team
- Copa LFP - FPF
- Supercopa Peruana
- Peruvian football league system
  - Peruvian Primera División
  - Peruvian Segunda División
  - Liga 3
  - Copa Perú
