= Top-up =

Top-up may refer to:

- Top-ups, a variation of a company's stock repurchase program for common shareholders
- Top-up card, see Prepaid mobile phone
- Top-up course and top-up degree, see Alternative pathways in education
- Top Up (album)
