= 1929 Peruvian Primera División =

Peruvian Primera División
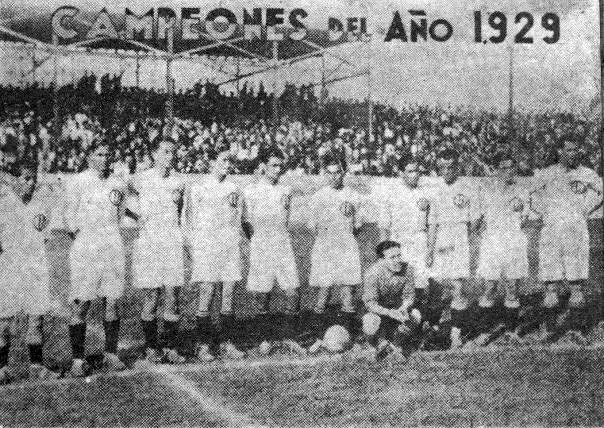
- Federación Universitaria, champion
- Season: 1929
- Dates: 7 July 1929 – 23 February 1930
- Champions: Federación Universitaria (1st title)
- Runner up: Circolo Sportivo Italiano
- Relegated: Jorge Chávez (C); Alianza Chorrillos
- Top goalscorer: Carlos Cillóniz (8 goals)

The 1929 Primera División was the 14th season of top-flight Peruvian football. A total of 13 teams competed in this league, with Federación Universitaria winning its first league title. Alianza Lima was disqualified after 7 games; their record was deleted but they were admitted for 1930.

== Changes from 1928 ==
=== Structural changes ===
The 1928 season was reduced from 19 to 13 teams and was played in a single league table instead of two. Thus, the championship group stage was removed. Two teams were relegated instead of eight.

=== Promotion and Relegation ===
Santa Catalina, Lawn Tennis, Asociación Alianza, Alberto Secada, Jorge Washington, Alianza Callao, José Olaya and Unión were relegated by placing last in their respective groups. Sporting Tabaco and Escuela de Hidroaviación were promoted in their place.

== Teams ==
=== Team changes ===
| Promoted from 1928 División Intermedia (Liguilla de Promoción) | Invited | Relegated from 1928 Primera División (Liguilla de Promoción) | Relegated from 1928 Primera División (Grupo 1) | Relegated from 1928 Primera División (Grupo 2) |
|---|---|---|---|---|
| ▲ Sporting Tabaco (2nd) | ▲ Escuela de Hidroaviación | ▼ Jorge Washington (3rd) ▼ Unión Santa Catalina (4th) | ▼ Lawn Tennis de la Exposición (7th) ▼ Association Alianza (8th) ▼ Alberto Secada (9th) | ▼ Alianza Callao (8th) ▼ José Olaya (9th) ▼ Unión (10th) |

=== Stadia and Locations ===
| Team | City |
|---|---|
| Alianza Chorrillos | Chorrillos, Lima |
| Alianza Lima | La Victoria, Lima |
| Atlético Chalaco | Callao |
| Ciclista Lima | Cercado de Lima |
| Circolo Sportivo Italiano | Pueblo Libre, Lima |
| Escuela de Hidroaviación | Ancón, Lima |
| Federación Universitaria | Cercado de Lima |
| Jorge Chávez | Callao |
| Sport Progreso | Rímac, Lima |
| Sporting Tabaco | Rímac, Lima |
| Sportivo Tarapacá | Cercado de Lima |
| Sportivo Unión | Cercado de Lima |
| Unión Buenos Aires | Callao |

== League table ==
=== Standings ===
| Pos | Team | Pld | W | D | L | GF | GA | GD | Pts | Qualification or relegation |
|---|---|---|---|---|---|---|---|---|---|---|
| 1 | Federación Universitaria (C) | 11 | 7 | 3 | 1 | 26 | 6 | +20 | 17 | Champions |
| 2 | Circolo Sportivo Italiano | 11 | 6 | 4 | 1 | 26 | 23 | +3 | 16 | |
| 3 | Escuela de Hidroaviación | 11 | 6 | 3 | 2 | 20 | 8 | +12 | 15 | |
| 4 | Sportivo Tarapacá | 11 | 7 | 1 | 3 | 26 | 19 | +7 | 15 | |
| 5 | Ciclista Lima | 11 | 6 | 1 | 4 | 19 | 13 | +6 | 13 | |
| 6 | Sporting Tabaco | 11 | 3 | 5 | 3 | 23 | 16 | +7 | 11 | |
| 7 | Sport Progreso | 11 | 4 | 3 | 4 | 19 | 23 | −4 | 11 | |
| 8 | Unión Buenos Aires | 11 | 2 | 6 | 3 | 17 | 19 | −2 | 10 | |
| 9 | Sportivo Unión | 11 | 3 | 3 | 5 | 11 | 22 | −11 | 9 | |
| 10 | Atlético Chalaco | 11 | 3 | 2 | 6 | 15 | 15 | 0 | 8 | |
| 11 | Jorge Chávez (R) | 11 | 2 | 3 | 6 | 14 | 16 | −2 | 7 | 1930 División Intermedia |
| 12 | Alianza Chorrillos (R) | 11 | 0 | 0 | 11 | 8 | 44 | −36 | 0 | 1930 División Intermedia |
| — | Alianza Lima | 7 | 5 | 2 | 0 | 24 | 7 | +17 | 12 | Excluded from the competition |

(C) Champions; (R) Relegated

== Results ==
Teams play each other once, either home or away. All matches were played in Lima.

| Home \ Away | ALI | ACH | CHA | CIC | CSI | HID | UNI | JCH | PRO | TAB | SUN | TAR | UBA |
|---|---|---|---|---|---|---|---|---|---|---|---|---|---|
| Alianza Lima | | ~~4–1~~ | ~~3–2~~ | | | | | | ~~8–0~~ | | | | ~~4–0~~ |
| Alianza Chorrillos | | | | 1–4 | | 0–9 | | | 2–5 | | | 1–4 | |
| Atlético Chalaco | | 6–0 | | 0–3 | | | | 5–0 | | 0–3 | | 1–2 | 2–4 |
| Ciclista Lima | | | | | 2–3 | | 1–0 | | 3–0 | | 0–2 | 3–8 | |
| Circolo Sportivo Italiano | ~~1–2~~ | 3–1 | 1–1 | | | | 0–7 | 1–0 | 2–2 | 1–0 | | | |
| Escuela de Hidroaviación | ~~1–1~~ | | W.O. | 1–3 | 2–2 | | | | | 1–1 | | 2–0 | 1–1 |
| Federación Universitaria | | 5–2 | 0–0 | | | 2–1 | | | | 0–0 | | 2–0 | 1–0 |
| Jorge Chávez | | 5–1 | | 3–0 | | 1–3 | 1–3 | | 2–2 | | 0–1 | | 0–0 |
| Sport Progreso | | | 2–1 | | | 0–1 | 0–5 | | | 2–2 | | | 2–2 |
| Sporting Tabaco | | 6–0 | | 1–3 | | | | 3–1 | | | 1–2 | | 3–0 |
| Sportivo Unión | | 2–1 | 0–4 | | 1–2 | 1–6 | 1–1 | | 0–1 | | | 2–2 | |
| Sportivo Tarapacá | ~~2–2~~ | | | | 3–5 | | | 4–1 | 3–2 | 0–2 | | | |
| Unión Buenos Aires | | 2–0 | | 6–0 | 1–1 | | | | | | 2–3 | 4–6 | |

Updated to match(es) played on 1929. Source: Diario El Comercio, La Prensa and Crónica.
Legend: Blue = home team win; Yellow = draw; Red = away team win.
