= 2025 Copa LFP - FPF =

Tournament details
- Country: Peru
- Dates: TBD
- Teams: 36

The 2025 Copa LFP - FPF, was the planned 1st edition of the Copa LFP - FPF, Peru's domestic football cup competition. The tournament was going to be disputed by 36 teams and the champion was going to qualify for the Copa Sudamericana.

On 11 February 2025, it was announced the 2025 edition was cancelled and will be held in 2026.

== Schedule ==
The schedule of the competition was to take place during the 2025 FIFA International Match Calendar.

== Teams ==
36 teams were going to take part in this edition: 19 from the Liga 1, 15 from the Liga 2 and 2 invited teams from the Liga 3.

=== Liga 1 ===
- ADT
- Alianza Atlético
- Alianza Lima
- Alianza Universidad
- Atlético Grau
- Ayacucho
- Binacional
- Cienciano
- Comerciantes Unidos
- Cusco
- Deportivo Garcilaso
- Juan Pablo II College
- Los Chankas
- Melgar
- Sport Boys
- Sport Huancayo
- Sporting Cristal
- Universitario
- UTC

=== Liga 2 ===
- Academia Cantolao
- ADA
- Bentín Tacna Heroica
- Cajamarca
- Carlos A. Mannucci
- Comerciantes
- Deportivo Coopsol
- Deportivo Llacuabamba
- Deportivo Moquegua
- Pirata
- San Marcos
- Santos
- Unión Comercio
- Universidad César Vallejo
- Universidad de San Martín

=== Invited teams ===
- TBA
- TBA

== See also ==
- 2025 Liga 1
- 2025 Liga 2
- 2025 Liga 3
