= Yape (payment) =

Peruvian financial technology service

- Developer: Banco de Crédito del Perú
- Stable release: 3.46.2 (Android); 3.46.0 (iOS)
- Platform: Android, iOS
- Predecessor: Soli (Bolivia)
- Size: Android: 77 MB iOS:326.8 MB
- Available in: Spanish
- Type: Payment service Payment network
- License: Yape © 2025
- Website: yape.com.pe
- Founded: September 5, 2016 (10 years ago) in Lima, Peru
- Headquarters: Jr. Centenario 156, La Molina 15026
- Areas served: Peru; Bolivia
- Products: YapePOS

Yape (pronounced [ˈʝape]) is a digital wallet and mobile payment application developed by the Banco de Crédito del Perú (BCP) in 2016. As of 2025, it has over 20 million users. Its features include instant, commission-free, peer-to-peer transfers, bill payments, and purchases using a smartphone via a phone number or QR code, without requiring a traditional bank account, enabling its use by the unbanked population.

Since its release, several features have been added to the app, including microcredits, international remittances, and e-commerce purchases through the Yape shop, and integration with international payment networks such as TerraPay and EBANX for cross-border transactions.

== Origins ==
Yape was founded in 2016 by the Banco de Crédito del Perú to enable users to make mobile payments and money transfers without the need for an ATM or a debit card, leveraging the growing use of smartphones in Peru. The application allowed users to send and receive money using only a mobile phone number or QR code, eliminating the need for cash or traditional banking infrastructure. As of 2022, cash transactions were predominant in Peru, with over 90% of payments for goods and services made in cash.

== History ==
In its early years, Yape targeted BCP account holders, particularly young professionals and university students, but faced challenges in being adopted due to low banking penetration rates among its initial target demographic. By 2017, the platform expanded to include users from other banks. The application's growth was further accelerated by the COVID-19 pandemic, which heightened the demand for contactless payment methods. By early 2020, Yape had 3.5 million users, with an additional 1.5 million joining during the pandemic.

The platform's evolution included the introduction of new features to enhance its utility and inclusivity. In 2020, Yape launched the Yape Card, a virtual card that allowed users to register with only a national identity document (DNI), removing the requirement of a bank account. This development significantly advanced financial inclusion, enabling unbanked individuals to participate in the digital economy. By 2023, Yape had over 12 million users, processing 10 million transactions daily, and expanded its services to include microcredits, bill payments, and mobile recharges.

Despite its achievements, Yape faced significant challenges. The application nearly failed on three occasions due to initial resistance from users accustomed to cash, internal resource allocation issues within BCP, and difficulties in promoting the app through traditional banking channels. Strategic adaptations, such as a focus on small merchants and the introduction of QR code payments for businesses, helped Yape overcome these hurdles. By 2024, Yape had 14 million users, with approximately one out of every two Peruvians using the app. The company introduced features such as international remittances and currency exchange. In 2025, the platform's partnership with Brazil's EBANX further expanded its capability for cross-border payments.

By 2025, it had over 17 million users and more than 2 million businesses accepting Yape payments. The platform is currently in collaboration with the Banco Central de Reserva del Perú to develop a real-time payment system similar to India's UPI underscore.

=== Name origin ===
In Peruvian slang, yapa is a widely used term originating from the Quechua word ñapa, meaning "to add" or "to increase". With regard to food establishments, it denotes a small petition for a bonus during consumption at food stalls, such as an extra portion of food at markets or food stands. This term is deeply ingrained in everyday interactions, where it symbolizes goodwill and fosters customer loyalty.

However, an alternative hypothesis suggests that Yape may also be linked to the Peruvian colloquial expression Ya, pe (a shortened form of ya, pues), which roughly translates to "come on", "okay then", or even "alright" in English, depending the context. This phrase is commonly used in informal speech to express agreement, urgency, or encouragement. According to Rufino Arribas, one of the chief Yape managers, the term was his own invention and was chosen for being catchy and memorable.

The app changed the way payments, transfers, and mobile top-ups are made, to the point that the word "yapear" became a generic verb to refer to digital transactions and part of Peruvian Spanish dialect.

== Technological evolution ==
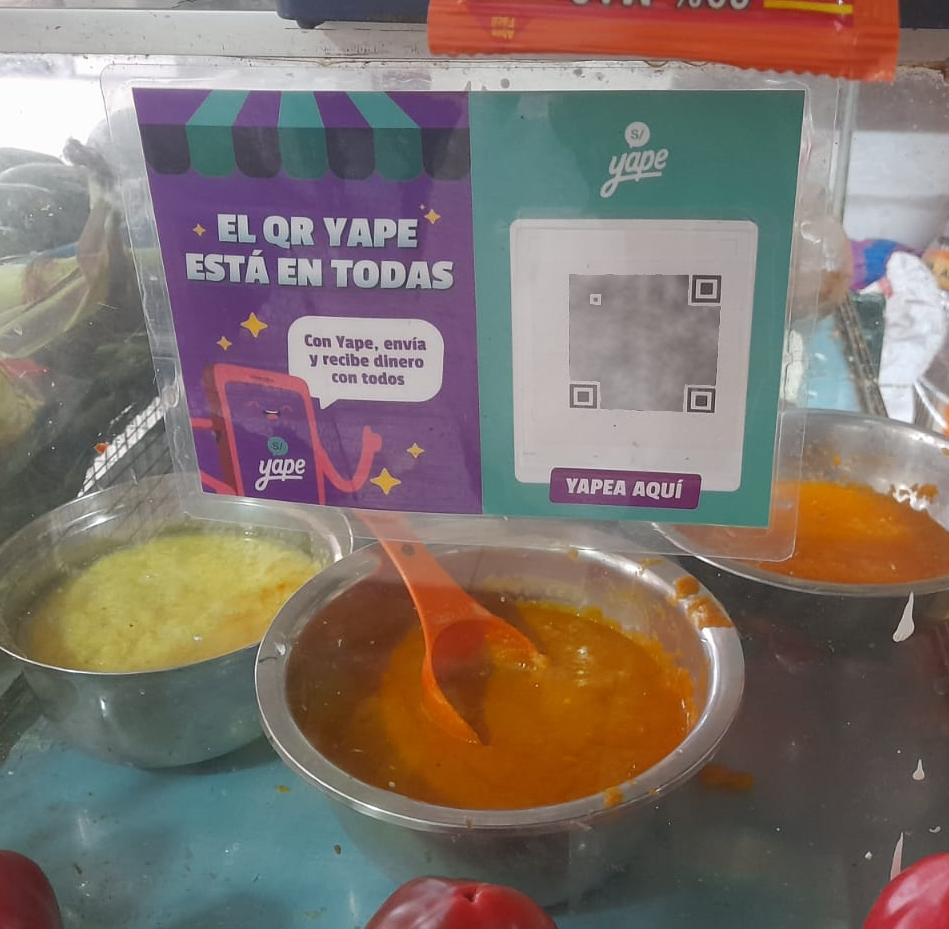
An example of using a QR code to transfer money.

With time, Yape began to improve its interface and transfer methods. When Yape was launched, it was mandatory to link it to a bank account, whether with BCP or another affiliated bank. In 2019, Yape announced its independence from BCP and in the following year enabled the option of opening a Yape account without having to link it to any bank account.

Originally Yape began as a person-to-person payment app, but later targeted small and micro businesses, which could benefit from facilitating the exchange of value without the need for cash. The app also added a QR code scanning function, which, through activations and commercial guidelines, informed businesses and customers on how to use the feature, promoting it as a new way to pay. One of its most well-known partnerships was with D'Onofrio ice cream makers, which adopted this method, further boosting the app's use. This action motivated other independent businesses to use the digital wallet in kiosks, market stalls, service businesses, taxi drivers, etc., and helped many startups. Peru has one of the highest informal economy rates in Latin America. This, in turn, is related to low banking access rates and, therefore, fewer people being able to access credit because banks cannot track their transactions. By solving the problem of visibility of businesses transactions of all sizes, Yape added information to banks' databases so they could offer loans tailored to small borrowers. Yape's current challenge is to expand its use in provinces where banking access is even lower, as well as the digital divide can work against it. To achieve this expansion, building partnerships with local entities and businesses is key.

=== Notable improvements ===
In 2019, Yape introduced new financial features such as utility payments, personal payments via QR code or telephone number, the ability to become a user without a BCP account, savings products, and immediate small-money loans.

Approximately in 2023, minors were allowed to have accounts so they can make payments on their own. All that is required is prior registration with an ID in the app, a joint account, and an alternate email address.

As of 2025, Yape is considering including salary-type payments through digital wallets, so that companies can pay their employees more easily. The withdrawal limit has also been extended to up to S/ 3,500.

=== Interoperability ===
Yape's adoption of interoperability with other national digital wallets in Peru, including Plin, IzipayYa (formerly Tunki), Bim, and others, represents a pivotal advance in the country's digital payment ecosystem. In October 2022, the Central Reserve Bank of Peru (BCRP) mandated interoperability among all digital wallets, culminating in a two-phase implementation.

In April 2023, phase one enabled seamless transactions between Yape and Plin, facilitated by Visa, allowing users to transfer money instantly using mobile numbers or QR codes across these platforms. By July 2023, the second phase extended interoperability to all Peruvian digital wallets, ensuring that over 14 million users could transact freely across platforms such as Yape, Plin, and others, regardless of the financial institution or wallet provider. This initiative, supported by the Peruvian Clearing House and global partners such as Mastercard and Visa Inc., resulted in over 1.6 million daily interoperable transactions, significantly enhancing financial inclusion and user convenience.

The BCRP's regulation, outlined in Circular No. 0024-2022-BCRP, mandated that entities submit interoperability schedules by October 2022, with full compliance by March 2023, fostering a cohesive digital payment network. This connectivity has driven a surge in digital transactions, with Yape alone handling over 2 million interoperable payments daily, reinforcing Peru's transition from a cash-based to a digital economy and supporting the financial inclusion of unbanked populations.

== Security ==
Since Yape's release in 2016, robust security measures were implemented to ensure the safety of its transactions, evolving alongside its growing user base and transaction volume. Initially, the platform relied on basic encryption protocols and user authentication via phone numbers or QR codes to secure peer-to-peer transfers. By 2020, as the platform expanded to include non-BCP users, and processed over 10 million daily transactions, Yape introduced multi-factor authentication (MFA), requiring national ID verification and biometric options such as fingerprint or facial recognition for enhanced user validation. The adoption of Microsoft Azure's cloud infrastructure further strengthened data protection, using advanced encryption standards to safeguard user information and transactions and provide a secure digital ecosystem. Recent advancements have solidified Yape's position as a secure digital wallet, particularly with its 2024 partnership with TerraPay for international remittances. This collaboration integrated real-time fraud monitoring and compliance with global regulatory standards, to ensure secure cross-border transactions. Yape's reported 93% transaction approval rate in 2024 reflects its effective anti-fraud measures, supported by BCP's backing and continuous developer training to address emerging cyber threats.

== Service diversity ==
=== Online shop ===
In late October 2023, the platform decided to launch its own virtual store, allowing users to purchase items such as technology, household appliances, groceries, and furniture through the app and have them delivered directly to their homes.

=== Service diversification ===
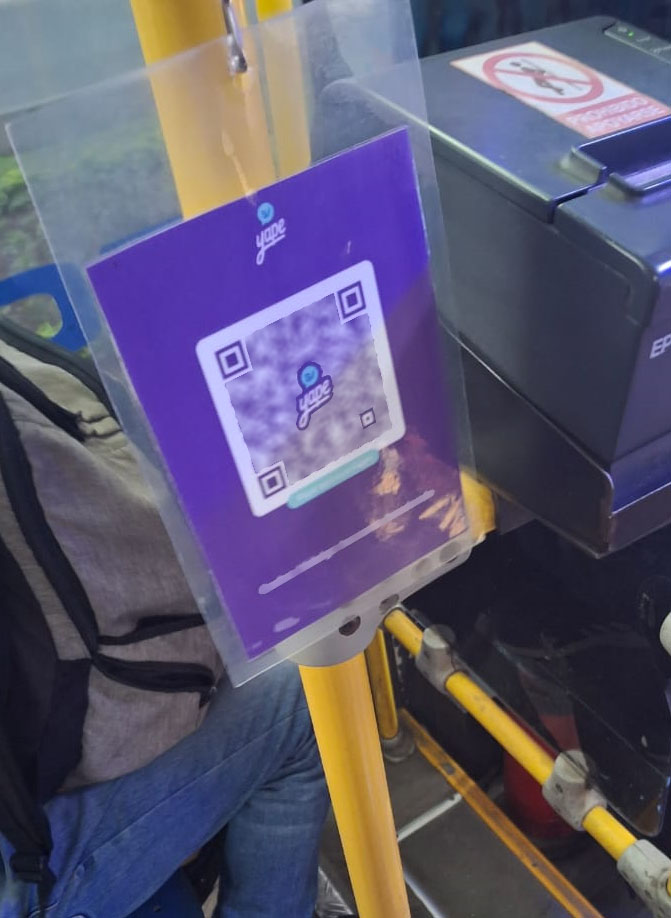
Public transport allowed to receive virtual payments to speed up queues and provide greater security.

Yape introduced the option to purchase food at a discount in restaurants, supermarkets, convenience stores, and fast-food outlets. This was achieved through strategic alliances with various companies and suppliers, with the goal of make access easier to the public. The initiative also sought to increase the number of partner businesses in Lima and regions such as Trujillo and Arequipa.

Additionally, the purchase of bus tickets, car insurance, and gas cylinder delivery have been added to the platform.

The app also allowed users to purchase tickets for soccer matches and other events, as well as gift cards for online games, utility bills, and cellphone top-ups. These features, which had been added earlier, along with the online shop, made the platform more varied, as well as the increased number of users seeking to purchase these items without having to leave the app.

=== Microcredits ===
In 2022, when the number of user clients reached 10 million, microcredits and money loan services were made available. Users can obtain a loan in a matter of seconds from the app and can choose specific repayment terms. Those with bank accounts were the main beneficiaries.

=== Remittances ===
The integration of international remittance services, launched in 2024 in partnership with TerraPay, has significantly enhanced Yape's functionality, allowing users to instantly receive funds from abroad without visiting physical bank branches.

Yape's system maintains partnerships with seven agencies and remittance companies, through which international transfers can be made online, greatly simplifying the process. Two of these entities are the American remittance services Ria Money Transfer and Remitly.

In addition, the platform began to offer the possibility of efficiently exchanging dollars within the same platform.

== User growth ==
Yape user Growth per year
The platform managed to boost their user increase with service diversification.

The app has demonstrated remarkable user growth since its launch in 2016, reaching people beyond Peru.

Between 2017 and 2019, the app gained 370,000 users. By 2020, the number surpassed more than 4 million.

In 2022, there were 10 million users.

In August 2023, Yape initiated its international expansion by entering Bolivia, replacing the existing Soli Pagos platform, which had 800,000 users. By early 2024, Yape had reached 1 million business in Bolivia, having sponsored major festivals like the Carnaval de Oruro and Santa Cruz, with the possibility of reaching more than 2.5 million.

In 2024, there were more than 16.5 million clients,

By the first quarter of 2025, the app's user base in Bolivia surged to over 3 million, with 1.35 million affiliated small businesses, outpacing its initial growth in Peru, where it took two years to reach 2 million users. The platform's focus on QR code transactions, which became the preferred payment method, positioned Yape as Bolivia's leading digital wallet, surpassing competitors in transaction volume.

In 2025, Yape had a total of 20 million users in both countries. In Bolivia there was an increase of one million users.

Countries that adopted the Yape transfer service as of 2025.

== Controversies ==
Since 2016, the platform has faced several controversies related to its functionality, particularly concerning verification and, especially, misuse of the app.

=== App misuse ===
One controversy involves accidental payments to unintended recipients, often due to users mistyping phone numbers or scanning the wrong QR code. The app's design, which relies on phone numbers or QR codes for instant transfers, has led to errors, particularly in busy environments. People and financial entities recommend directly contacting the person or establishment that received the erroneous payment and requesting a refund of the amount sent. However, this does not guarantee that the amount will be recovered, especially if it is not a huge sum.

Another point of contention is the app's practice of displaying the full names of both the payer and payee during transactions, raising privacy concerns. Many have expressed discomfort with this transparency, particularly in peer-to-peer transactions involving strangers or merchants, as it exposes personal information unnecessarily. The full name is omitted if the payment was done via telephone number, which is displayed partially censored.

This feature, intended to confirm recipient identity, has been criticized for lacking user control over privacy settings, especially in a context where digital fraud and social engineering are growing risks. While Yape employs encryption and multi-factor authentication to secure transactions, the full-name display has been a persistent source of unease, as it could potentially be exploited in phishing or impersonation scams.

== SUNAT fiscal revenue audit ==
The Superintendencia Nacional de Aduanas y de Administración Tributaria (National Superintendency of Tax Administration, or SUNAT) has intensified its fiscal oversight of small businesses utilizing Yape for transactions, targeting those with annual revenues exceeding 45,000 PEN to ensure compliance with tax obligations. This initiative, effective from mid-2025, leverages the traceability of digital transactions to cross-reference with declared incomes, aiming to curb informal commerce. However, the measure has sparked significant concern among small-scale entrepreneurs, who fear disproportionate scrutiny and potential account seizures, perceiving it as a burden on modest operations. Critics argue that without adequate simplification and support, such rigorous enforcement may deter digital adoption and drive businesses back to cash transactions, undermining financial inclusion efforts.

=== Criminal abuse ===
The app was in serious dispute due to its use in criminal activities, such as scams, frauds, or cyber thefts.

Criminals have exploited the platform by generating fake payment screenshots or using malicious apks, which had a similar interface to simulate legitimate transactions. These fraudulent apps allowed users to create convincing, but false, bank transfer receipts, deceiving vendors—especially in small-scale markets— who release goods or services without verifying actual receipt of payment. Such scams have eroded trust in digital transactions, with victims often discovering the fraud only after checking their bank accounts, as highlighted by reports of fake banking apps mimicking legitimate platforms. In response, Yape introduced a critical security update back in April 2025, implementing a three-digit security code system. This code appears on both the sender's payment confirmation and the recipient's notification, enabling vendors to instantly verify transaction authenticity, rendering older fake screenshot designs obsolete.

Another issue involves fake QR codes, displayed at small businesses, designed to install malware or facilitate unauthorized bank account access. These malicious QRs, when scanned, can redirect users to phishing sites or install trojans, which exploit Android devices to steal financial data or remotely controlled devices for fraudulent transactions. Such schemes have led to significant financial losses, with some cases resulting in complete bank account depletion. To counter these threats, the platform implemented robust security measures, including the introduction of the 1820 speed-dial number to allow users to quickly block their accounts in case of a stolen or lost phone, preventing unauthorized access. Additionally, Yape offers optional insurance to protect users' funds against fraud, providing reimbursement for losses due to unauthorized transactions.

==== Laundering and extortion ====
A particularly alarming controversy involves innocent civilians inadvertently caught in criminal investigations after sharing their QR codes. In some instances, individuals have shared their codes with seemingly trustworthy parties, only to receive funds from illicit activities, such as robberies, extortion, or bank account emptying schemes. These unsuspecting users have faced arrest, accused of being accomplices, as their accounts contained recently transferred funds linked to crimes. Local reports in Lima and other parts of the country also document violent cases, such as thieves assaulting independent market vendors and forcing them to deposit money into the perpetrator's Yape or Plin accounts, exploiting the app's instant transfer capabilities.

== Upcoming ==
In addition to its current features, Yape was to add new functions by 2025. Yape's business model, centered on the war on cash and subsequent monetization, is expected to be replicated in other parts of Latin America, such as Ecuador, Colombia, and Central America, where cash use remains relevant.
