= Copa Uruguay (Perú) =

Copa Uruguay Presidente Brum
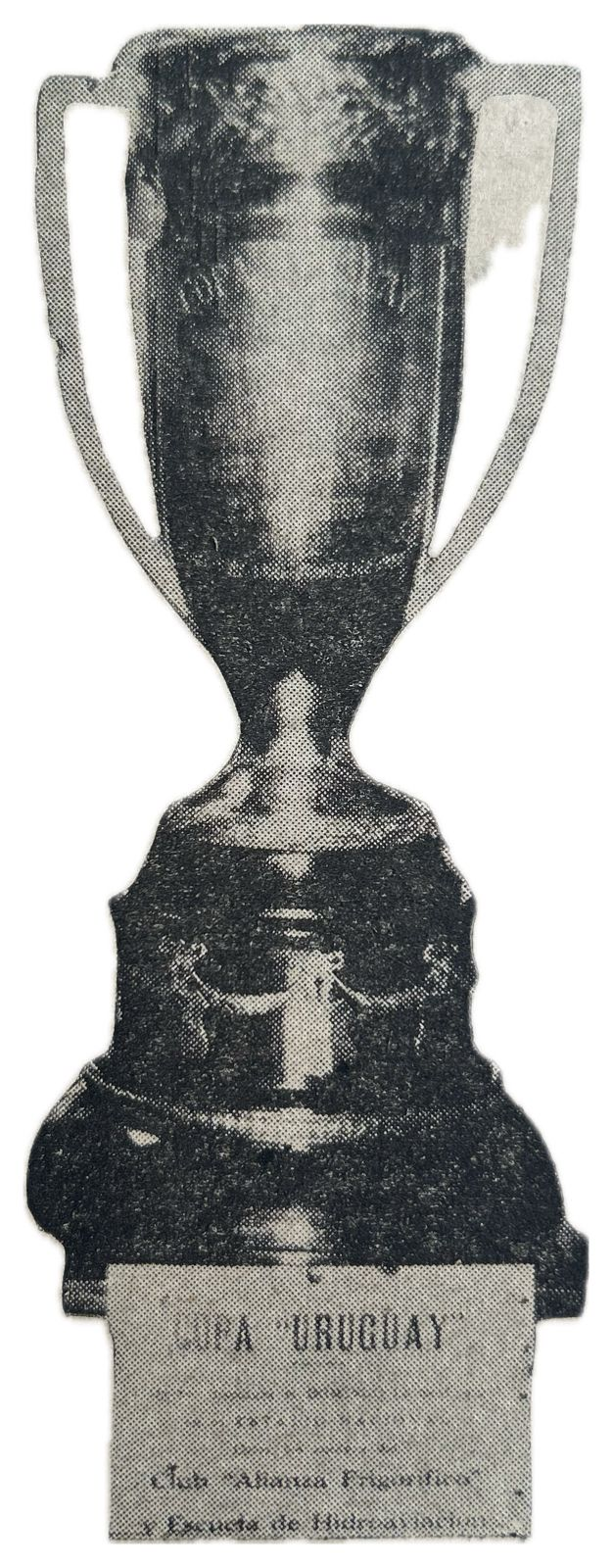
- Copa Uruguay trophy donated by the government of Uruguay.
- Founded: 1928
- Folded: 1932; 94 years ago
- Region: Peru
- Most championships: Armada Nacional (1 title); Hidroaviación (1 title)

The Copa Uruguay Presidente Brum also called the Copa Uruguay or Copa Brum, it was an official Peruvian football cup created and then organized by the Peruvian Football Federation and donated by the government of Uruguay.

== Background ==
At the initiative of the Peruvian Football Federation, a tournament was organized between the clubs and leagues of Lima and Callao in 1928. The format and dates were programmed by the FPF, in addition to establishing the Lima stadiums, Estadio Nacional, Circolo Sportivo Italiano and the Stadium Modelo de Bellavista (Estadio Telmo Carbajo).

== Champions ==
- (In bracket, title count):

Ed.	Season	Champion	Score	Runner-up
1	1928	Armada Nacional (1)	2–0	Liga de Balnearios del Sur
2	1931–32	Escuela de Hidroaviación (2)	4–1	Alianza Frigorífico

== 1928 Copa Uruguay ==
Escuela de Hidroaviación, representative of the Armada Nacional was the champion by defeating Circolo Sportivo Italiano, representative of the Liga de Balnearios del Sur. Likewise, according to the Tournament Rules, the champion team qualified for the 1928 Campeonato Nacional.

=== Teams ===
Team	City
Armada Nacional	Ancón, Lima
Asociación Deportiva de Barrios Altos	Barrios Altos, Lima
Asociación Deportiva del Rímac	Rímac, Lima
Liga de Balnearios del Sur	Magdalena, Lima
Liga Deportiva Chalaca N°1	Callao
Liga Deportiva Chalaca N°2	Callao
Liga Provincial de Lima N°1	Cercado de Lima
Liga Provincial de Lima N°2	Cercado de Lima

=== Bracket ===
Quarterfinals
Armada Nacional	5
A.D. del Rímac	0
Liga Provincial de Lima N°1	3
A.D. Barrios Altos	1
Liga de Balnearios del Sur	2
Liga Deportiva Chalaca N°1	0
Liga Provincial de Lima N°2	5
Liga Deportiva Chalaca N°2	1

Semifinals
Armada Nacional	2
Liga Provincial de Lima N°1	1
Liga de Balnearios del Sur	2
Liga Provincial de Lima N°2	1

Finals
Armada Nacional	2
Liga de Balnearios del Sur	0

=== Quarterfinals ===
11 November 1928
14:00

Armada Nacional	5–0	Asociación Deportiva del Rímac

Estadio Nacional, Lima
Referee: Alberto Benites
11 November 1928
14:00

Liga Provincial de Lima N°2	5–1	Liga Deportiva Chalaca N°2

Estadio Modelo de Bellavista, Callao
Referee: Donayre
11 November 1928
15:45

Liga Provincial de Lima N°1	3–1	Asociación Deportiva de Barrios Altos

Estadio Nacional, Lima
Referee: Marquez
11 November 1928
15:45

Liga Deportiva Chalaca N°1	0–2	Liga de Balnearios del Sur

Estadio Modelo de Bellavista, Callao
Referee: Julio Borelli

=== Semifinals ===
18 November 1928
14:00

Liga de Balnearios del Sur	2–1	Liga Provincial de Lima N°2

Estadio Víctor Manuel III, Lima
Referee: Donayre
18 November 1928
15:45

Armada Nacional	2–1	Liga Provincial de Lima N°1

Estadio Víctor Manuel III, Lima
Referee: Marquez

=== Final ===
25 November 1928
15:45

Armada Nacional	2–0	Liga de Balnearios del Sur

Estadio Nacional, Lima
Referee: Alberto Benites

== 1931–32 Copa Uruguay ==
The club Escuela de Hidroaviación directly entered the final as defending champion. While Atlético Chalaco and Federación Universitaria decided not to participate in the cup and Alianza Lima did not participate either because they were on tour in Costa Rica.

Circolo Sportivo Italiano and Sporting Tabaco withdrew during the tournament.

=== Teams ===
Team	City
Alianza Frigorífico	Callao
Circolo Sportivo Italiano	Pueblo Libre, Lima
Escuela de Hidroaviación	Ancón, Lima
Sporting Tabaco	Rímac, Lima
Sportivo Tarapacá Ferrocarril	Cercado de Lima
Sportivo Unión	Cercado de Lima
Unión Buenos Aires	Callao

=== Serie A ===
1 January 1932
16:15

Alianza Frigorífico	2–2	Sporting Tabaco

Estadio Nacional, Lima
Referee: Miguel Serra

=== Serie B ===
25 December 1931
14:00

Unión Buenos Aires	4–2	Sportivo Unión

Estadio Nacional, Lima
Referee: Félix Luque
25 December 1931
16:30

Sportivo Tarapacá Ferrocarril	5–1	Circolo Sportivo Italiano

Estadio Nacional, Lima
Referee: Miguel Serra
3 January 1932

Sportivo Unión	W.O.	Circolo Sportivo Italiano

3 January 1932
16:10

Sportivo Tarapacá Ferrocarril	5–3	Unión Buenos Aires

Estadio Nacional, Lima
Referee: Manuel Conde
6 January 1932

Unión Buenos Aires	W.O.	Circolo Sportivo Italiano

6 January 1932
17:00

Sportivo Tarapacá Ferrocarril	2–0	Sportivo Unión

Estadio Nacional, Lima
Referee: Alberto Benites

=== Semifinal ===
10 January 1932
16:30

Alianza Frigorífico	3–2	Sportivo Tarapacá Ferrocarril

Estadio Nacional, Lima
Referee: Félix Luque

=== Final ===
17 January 1932
16:30

Escuela de Hidroaviación	4–1	Alianza Frigorífico

Estadio Nacional, Lima
Referee: César López Cárdenas

== See also ==
- 1928 Primera División
- 1928 Torneo Interligas
- 1928 Campeonato Nacional
