= 1928 Torneo Interligas (Perú) =

Torneo Interligas
Tournament details
- Country: Peru
- Dates: 1 April – 13 May 1928
- Teams: 9

Final positions
- Champions: Alianza Lima
- Runners-up: Liga de Balnearios del Sur

Tournament statistics
- Matches played: 10
- Goals scored: 44 (4.4 per match)

The Torneo Interligas also called the Copa de Liga del Perú, it was an official Peruvian football competition created and then organized by the Peruvian Football Federation and Diario El Tiempo in Tribute to the Club Alianza Lima. Alianza Lima was the champion by defeating Circolo Sportivo Italiano, representative of the Liga de Balnearios del Sur.

== Background ==
At the initiative of the newspaper El Tiempo and the Peruvian Football Federation, a tournament was organized between the clubs and leagues of Lima and Callao in 1928. The format and dates were programmed by the FPF, in addition to establishing the Lima stadiums, Estadio Víctor Manuel III, Estadio Nacional, and the Callao stadium, Estadio Telmo Carbajo.

The competition had planned to have defined the finalist who would face Alianza Lima after the return of their international tour through Costa Rica, Mexico, Cuba and Panama. The winner would obtain the League Cup and eleven gold medals, in addition to a financial sum. The tournament began on April 1, 1928.

The participants would be the various Leagues of Lima and Callao in addition to the recent affiliate member of the FPF, the Federación Universitaria.

On Thursday, May 3, the Alianza Lima delegation would be received by the local football authorities, the Peruvian Football Federation and the Leagues, in the port of Callao after its tour in Central America and North America, in which it won 13 of its 18 matches played.

=== Alianza Lima tour results ===
==== Costa Rica ====
Costa Rica
Match	Home Club	Score	Away Club	Date
1	Herediano	4–3	Alianza Lima	1 January 1928
2	La Libertad	0–2	Alianza Lima	8 January 1928
3	Domingueño	2–3	Alianza Lima	10 January 1928
4	Herediano	1–4	Alianza Lima	15 January 1928
5	La Libertad	1–2	Alianza Lima	22 January 1928
6	Gimnástica Limonense	0–3	Alianza Lima	29 January 1928

==== México ====
México
Match	Home Club	Score	Away Club	Date
7	Atlante	1–2	Alianza Lima	12 February 1928
8	Asturias	1–7	Alianza Lima	19 February 1928
9	América	3–5	Alianza Lima	26 February 1928
10	Real Club España	2–3	Alianza Lima	4 March 1928
11	América	1–4	Alianza Lima	11 March 1928

==== Cuba ====
Cuba
Match	Home Club	Score	Away Club	Date
12	Juventud Asturiana	1–1	Alianza Lima	18 March 1928
13	Hispano América	2–2	Alianza Lima	25 March 1928
14	Juventud Asturiana	6–1	Alianza Lima	1 April 1928
15	Cataluña	4–3	Alianza Lima	5 April 1928

==== Costa Rica ====
Costa Rica
Match	Home Club	Score	Away Club	Date
16	La Libertad	1–4	Alianza Lima	15 April 1928
17	Herediano	1–8	Alianza Lima	22 April 1928

==== Panamá ====
Panamá
Match	Home Club	Score	Away Club	Date
18	Estrella	1–7	Alianza Lima	April 1928

== Teams ==
Team	City
Alianza Lima	La Victoria, Lima
Asociación Deportiva de Barrios Altos	Barrios Altos, Lima
Asociación Deportiva del Rímac	Rímac, Lima
Federación Universitaria	Cercado de Lima
Liga de Balnearios del Sur	Magdalena, Lima
Liga Deportiva Chalaca N°1	Callao
Liga Deportiva Chalaca N°2	Callao
Liga Provincial de Lima N°1	Cercado de Lima
Liga Provincial de Lima N°2	Cercado de Lima

== Torneo Interligas ==
=== Bracket ===
First Round
A.D. del Rímac	1	7	8
A.D. Barrios Altos	1	0	1
Liga Provincial de Lima N°2	1	—	1
Liga de Balnearios del Sur	4	—	4
Liga Provincial de Lima N°1	4	—	4
Liga Deportiva Chalaca N°2	2	—	2
Liga Deportiva Chalaca N°1	1	3	4
Federación Universitaria	1	1	2

Quarterfinals
A.D. del Rímac	1
Liga de Balnearios del Sur	6
Liga Provincial de Lima N°1	4
Liga Deportiva Chalaca N°1	1

Semifinal
Liga de Balnearios del Sur	2
Liga Provincial de Lima N°1	1
Final
Liga de Balnearios del Sur	0
Alianza Lima	3

=== First round ===
1 April 1928

Asociación Deportiva del Rímac	1–1	Asociación Deportiva de Barrios Altos

Estadio Víctor Manuel III, Lima
1 April 1928

Liga de Balnearios del Sur	4–1	Liga Provincial de Lima N°2

Estadio Víctor Manuel III, Lima
8 April 1928

Liga Provincial de Lima N°1	4–2	Liga Deportiva Chalaca N°2

Estadio Nacional, Lima
8 April 1928

Federación Universitaria	1–1	Liga Deportiva Chalaca N°1

Estadio Nacional, Lima

==== Tiebreakers ====
8 April 1928

Asociación Deportiva del Rímac	7–0	Asociación Deportiva de Barrios Altos

Estadio Víctor Manuel III, Lima
15 April 1928

Liga Deportiva Chalaca N°1	3–1	Federación Universitaria

Estadio Modelo de Bellavista, Callao

=== Quarterfinals ===
22 April 1928

Liga de Balnearios del Sur	6–1	Asociación Deportiva del Rímac

Estadio Víctor Manuel III, Lima
22 April 1928

Liga Provincial de Lima N°1	4–1	Liga Deportiva Chalaca N°1

Estadio Víctor Manuel III, Lima

=== Semifinal ===
29 April 1928

Liga de Balnearios del Sur	2–1	Liga Provincial de Lima N°1

Estadio Víctor Manuel III, Lima

=== Final ===
13 May 1928
15:45

Alianza Lima	3–0	Liga de Balnearios del Sur
Alejandro Villanueva 36' 47'; José María Lavalle 38'

Estadio Nacional, Lima
Referee: Ricardo Arrendondo

== See also ==
- 1928 Primera División
- 1928 Copa Uruguay
- 1928 Campeonato Nacional
