= Copa de la Liga (Peru) =

- Organiser(s): Peruvian Football Federation
- Founded: 2025; 1 year ago
- Region: Peru
- Teams: 36
- Qualifier for: Recopa Peruana
- Related competitions: Liga 1 Liga 2
- Current champions: Sporting Cristal (1st title)
- Most championships: Sporting Cristal (1 title)
- Broadcaster: Bicolor+
- 2026 season

The Copa de la Liga (English: Cup of the League), officially known as Copa Caliente de la Liga for sponsorship reasons, is the annual football cup competition in Peru organized by the Liga de Fútbol Profesional Peruana (LFP) and Peruvian Football Federation (FPF). The tournament is contested between teams of the Liga 1 and Liga 2.

== Format ==
Since the first edition in 2026, the competition is divided into two stages, the group stage and knockout stage. In the group stage, teams from the Liga 1 and Liga 2 were drawn into groups of four or three teams. In these groups, each team will play each other in a round robin system, with the top group winners advancing to the knockout stage. Each knockout stage match is played once, with the exception of the semi-finals, which are played home and away. The winner is determined in a single match of the final.

== History ==
For most of Peruvian football history, a domestic football cup for clubs of the first division or second division has been absent. A few cup competitions were organized in recent years but were discontinued after a few seasons. The Torneo del Inca and Copa Bicentenario were the most recent attempts at establishing a domestic cup for first and second division clubs but were dissolved after numerous cancellations by the Peruvian Football Federation.

In 2024, the FPF announced that in 2025 there will be a new cup competition in Peru, initially called Copa de la Liga Peruana. The competition was to be played with the teams of the Liga 1 and Liga 2, with invited teams from the Liga 3. It was going to have a similar format to the Copa Argentina, being a knock-out round tournament and acting as an additional qualifier for the Copa Sudamericana. It was expected to be played in between international FIFA dates.

On 10 December 2024 the tournament was officially announced with a new name, Copa LFP - FPF. The tournament logo and trophy bears similar resemblance to the Copa Bicentenario, possibly implying that the old tournament has had a name rebrand. On 11 February 2025, it was announced the 2025 edition was cancelled and will be held in 2026.

On January 9, 2026, during the draw for the 2026 Liga 1 season, it was confirmed that the Copa de la Liga will be held that year. During the 2026 FIFA World Cup, the Liga 1 will not be played; therefore, the new national cup will take place between June and July. On April 30, 2026, the Copa de la Liga was officially announced by the Liga de Fútbol Profesional Peruana (LFP) with the sponsorship of Caliente.pe.

== Champions ==
Ed.	Year	Champion	Score(s)	Runner-up	Venue(s)	Winning manager
–	2025	Cancelled by the FPF, citing contractual issues related to television broadcasting.				
1	2026	Sporting Cristal (1)	2–0 (a.e.t.)	Alianza Atlético	Estadio Mansiche, Trujillo	(Peru) Roberto Mosquera

== Titles by club ==
Rank	Club	Winners	Runners-up	Winning years	Runners-up years
1	Sporting Cristal	1	0	2026	—
—	Alianza Atlético	0	1	—	2026

== Top Scorers ==
=== By season ===
Ed.	Player	Goals	Club
2026	(Colombia) David Camacho	4	UTC
2026	(Uruguay) Fernando Mathías López	4	Bentín Tacna Heroica

== See also ==
- Liga 1
- Liga 2
- Supercopa Peruana
- Copa Bicentenario
