= Banco de Crédito del Perú =

Peruvian bank

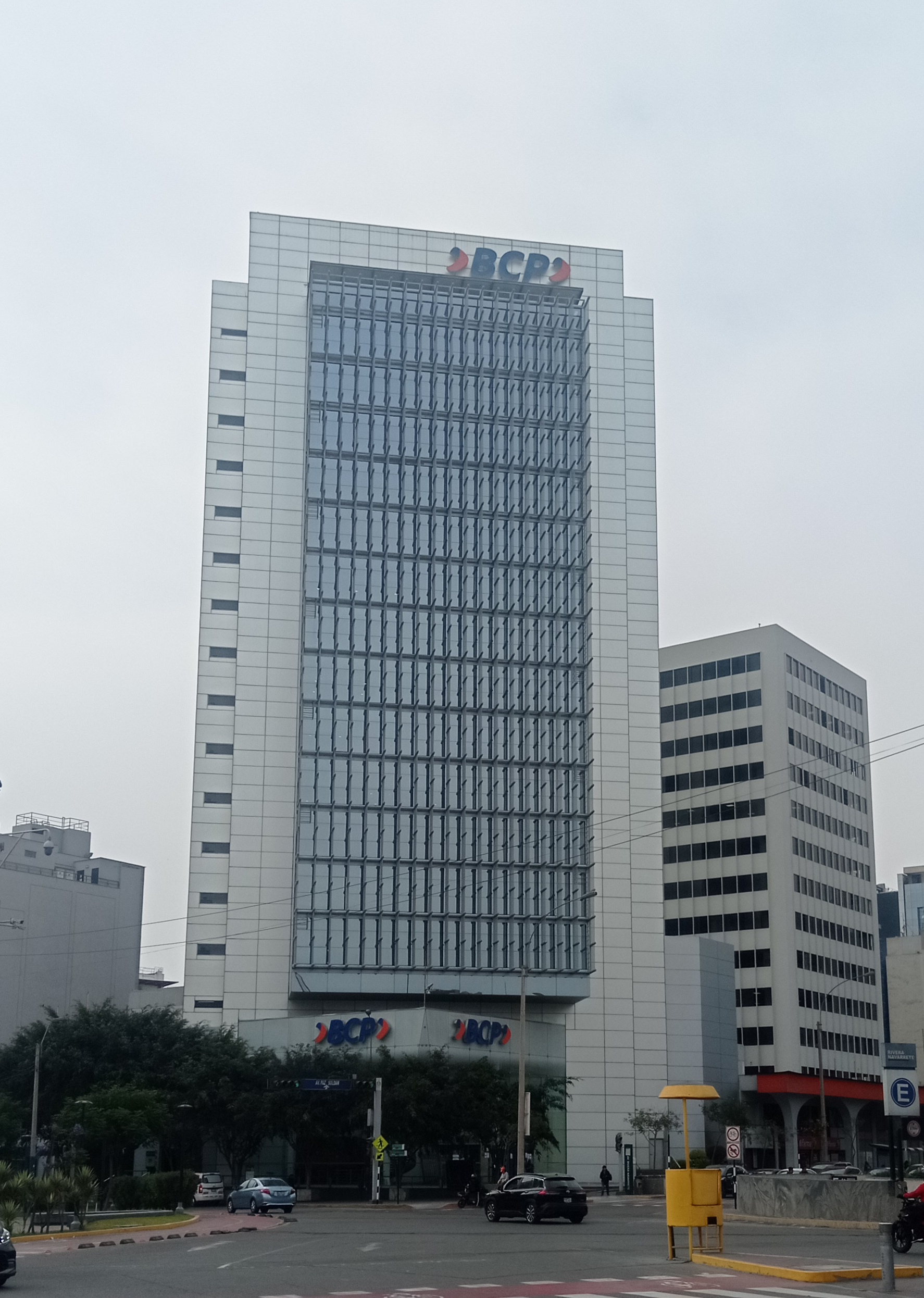
- Headquarters in San Isidro district, Lima
- Type: Private bank
- Traded as: BVL: CREDITC1
- ISIN: PEP120001008
- Industry: Financial services
- Founded: 1889; 137 years ago
- Headquarters: Lima, Peru
- Key people: Luis Enrique Romero Belismelis (chairman); Diego Cavero Belaunde (CEO)
- Products: Commercial banking
- Revenue: ▲ S/ 16.93 billion (2025)
- Net income: ▲ S/ 6.48 billion (2025)
- Total assets: ▲ S/ 203.23 billion (2025)
- Number of employees: 20,700 (2025)
- Parent: Credicorp
- Website: www.viabcp.com

Banco de Crédito del Perú (Spanish pronunciation: [ˈbanko ðe ˈkɾeðito ðel peˈɾu]; BCP) is the largest bank and the largest supplier of integrated financial services in Peru by total assets, according to data from the Superintendencia de Banca y Seguros del Perú). As of December 2025, BCP held total assets of S/ 203,228 million (approximately US$54 billion). It is the main operating subsidiary of Credicorp, Peru's largest financial holding company.

According to SBS data, BCP holds a market share of 33.43% in total loans and 36.18% in total deposits as of December 2025. BCP was founded on April 9, 1889, as Banco Italiano by a group of Italian-Peruvian businessmen in Lima, and adopted its current name on January 21, 1942.

BCP serves more than 16 million clients through a network of 305 branches, 10,400 BCP Agents, and 2,400 ATMs.

== Operations ==
BCP has more than 133 years of presence in the country and represents Peru's most valuable brand. Its network of more than 8,340 points of contact serves its more than 6 million clients. BCP is the main subsidiary of Credicorp (NYSE: BAP), the largest financial holding in Peru.

=== Retail Banking ===
BCP’s Retail Banking serves individuals and small-sized companies across three sub-segments: Banca Consumo (mass market), Banca Exclusiva (upper-middle income), and Banca Enalta (high-net-worth). Core products include savings accounts, personal loans, credit cards, mortgage loans (including the government-backed MiVivienda program), and vehicle loans.

BCP is also the largest capital market and brokerage distribution system in Peru; its main activities include asset management, foreign exchange transactions, treasury, custody and trust, investment advisory services, and research activities. As of December 2025, the retail banking division served 13.7 million clients, with 89% of all monetary transactions conducted through digital channels.

=== Savings accounts ===
BCP offers savings accounts to individuals and businesses across its branch network and digital channels. As of December 2025, BCP held a 43.91% market share in savings and demand deposits from individuals in Peru, according to SBS data, and a 33.58% market share in severance compensation accounts (CTS). The bank also operates Warda, a no-fee digital savings account accessible through mobile banking or the Yape app.

=== Personal loans ===
BCP provides consumer and personal loans to individuals through its retail banking network. As of December 2025, BCP held a 33.43% market share in total loans in Peru, according to SBS data, and accounted for more than 70% of the growth in direct loans across the Peruvian banking system during 2025. The bank also offers mortgage loans under Peru’s government-backed MiVivienda housing program, holding a 39.50% market share in that segment, and leads total mortgage loans with a 32.68% market share as of December 2025.

=== Credit cards ===
BCP issues credit cards for individuals and businesses. It is currently the market leader in credit cards in Peru, with a 33.95% market share in revolving balances as of December 2025, according to SBS data. BCP also processes approximately 36% of total Visa card transaction volume in Peru as the primary payment bank.

=== Small Business Banking ===
BCP's Small Business Banking serves 2.4 million SME clients. Products include working capital loans, invoice discounting (Factura Negociable), and the Mi Negocio digital platform. In 2025, SME clients with active loans grew 49% year-over-year to 327,600.

=== Wholesale Banking ===
BCP's Wholesale Banking competes with local and foreign banks and provides its customers with short and medium-term loans in local and foreign currencies, foreign trade-related financing, lease financing, underwriting and financial advisory. As of December 2025, BCP held a market share of more than 50% in demand deposits from individuals and companies combined, and processed approximately 36% of total Visa card transaction volume in Peru as the primary payment bank.

== History ==
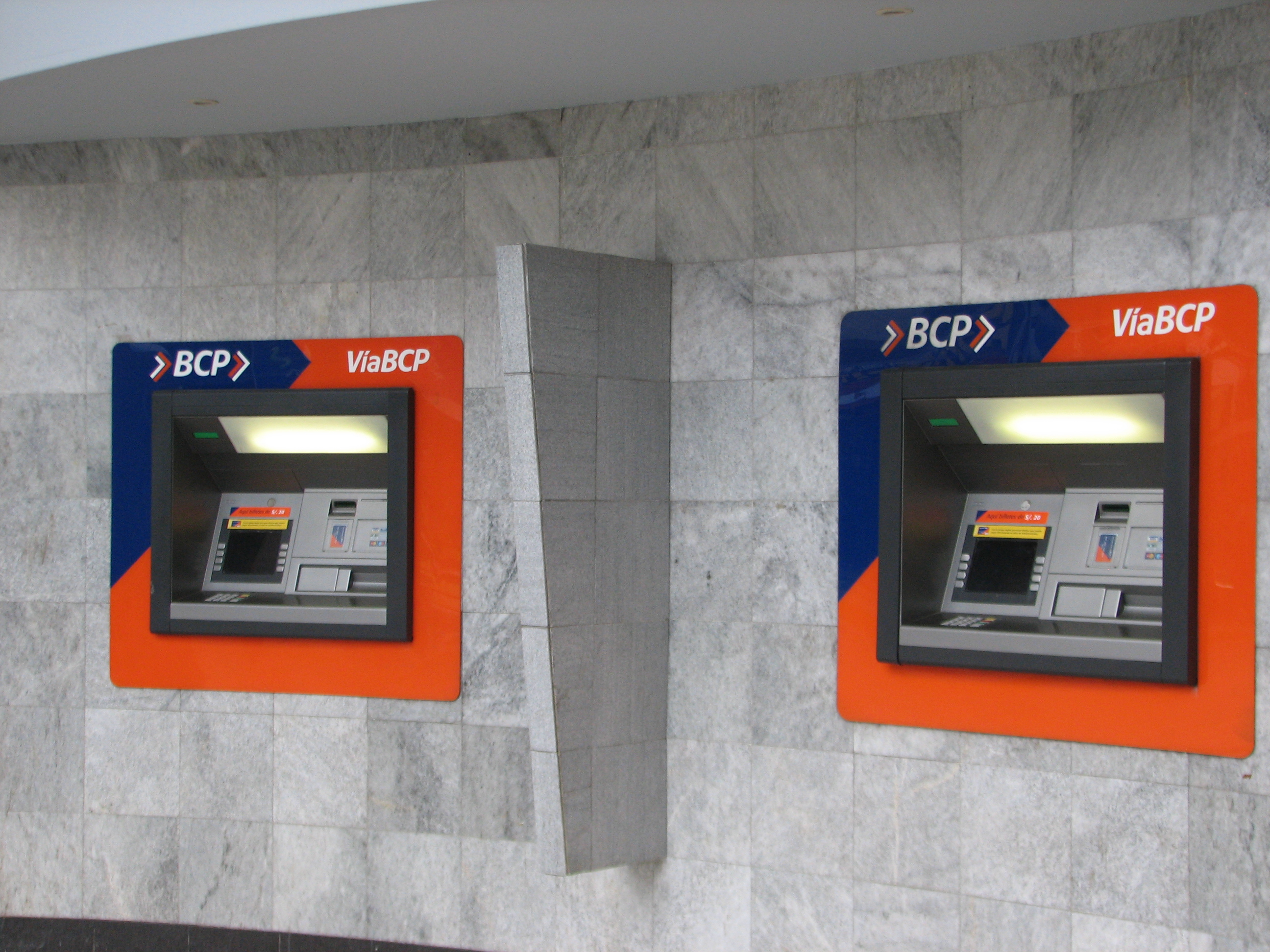
BCP ATMs in Huaraz, Peru

=== Founding as Banco Italiano (1889–1941) ===
Banco de Crédito del Perú (BCP), was incorporated on April 3, 1889, as "Banco Italiano" ("Italian Bank"), founded by Italian-Peruvian merchants. It began operations on April 9, 1889, in downtown Lima with five employees. Its first president was José Alberto Larco.

Within its first two decades, Banco Italiano opened branches in Callao, Chincha, Arequipa, and Mollendo, and established the Compañía de Seguros Italia as a subsidiary. In 1928 the bank inaugurated a new headquarters designed by architect Ricardo de Jaxa Malachowski.

In September 1935, when war broke out between Italy and Ethiopia, a smear campaign targeted Banco Italiano. Director Rollin Thorne Sologuren publicly defended the bank, emphasizing it operated under Peruvian law and was independent of the Italian government.

=== Becoming Banco de Crédito del Perú (1942–1999) ===
In 1941 the Romero family acquired Banco Italiano. On January 21, 1942, the institution adopted its current name. BCP then opened branches in Nassau (Bahamas) and New York City. In 1994 BCP expanded into Bolivia through the acquisition of Banco Popular, which eventually became Banco de Crédito de Bolivia.

=== Regional expansion (2000–2016) ===
BCP built its new corporate headquarters in Lima's La Molina District — a complex of over 49,000 m² across five levels. In 2004, the Miami chapter of the American Institute of Architects awarded the building the AIA Test of Time Award. In 2010, BCP acquired Edyficar, a microfinance company. In 2014, Edyficar acquired and merged with Mibanco, making BCP Group the largest microcredit provider in the Peruvian financial system.

=== Digital transformation era (2017–present) ===
In 2017 BCP launched Yape, a digital wallet. By end-2025 Yape had more than 19.1 million active users. Since 2022, more than 1.3 million people accessed their first credit product through Yape, 41% of whom are women.

In 2025, generative AI became a cross-cutting enabler: 50% of BCP's employees use AI tools on a daily basis.

=== El Cuy Magico - The Magic Guinea Pig (2008-present) ===
In October 2008, BCP launched the "Cuy Magico" ("Magic Guinea Pig") campaign, created by agency Circus, to promote its "Tarjeta Credito Negocios" ("Business Credit Card") targeting micro and small enterprises. The character, an animated giant guinea pig that advises entrepreneurs, transcended the original campaign and was embraced by Peruvians as a cultural mascot, appearing in everyday conversations both online and offline.

Over the years, "El Cuy Magico" transcended bank advertising and was embraced by Peruvians as a cultural symbol, appearing in everyday conversations, television programs, and events unrelated to BCP. The character has remained active: in December 2024, BCP launched the Christmas campaign "Jugueteria Regalona del Cuy Magico" ("The Cuy Mágico Holiday Gift Shop") at Mega Plaza, aimed at encouraging savings habits.

== Awards and recognition ==
In 2012, Euromoney magazine recognized BCP as the best bank in Peru, one of its earliest major international recognitions of this kind.

In 2025, Global Finance Magazine awarded BCP Best Bank in Peru, and Latin Finance named it Bank of the Year: Peru.

In the same year, Euromoney recognized BCP as Peru's Best Transaction Bank at its Transaction Banking Awards.

== Headquarters ==
BCP's headquarters serves as the bank's main office and operations center. The building spans more than 49,000 m² across five levels; its large floor plates maximize flexibility, enhance future adaptability and reduce dependence on elevators. Due to the size of each floor, individual departments are designed with distinctive elements that give them their own identity. All levels are visually connected in the main lobby through an elliptical glass atrium that traverses the entire structure.

Public-use areas are separated from working areas by a structural volume elevated 9 meters above ground on columns. Facilities include a cafeteria, teleconference rooms, a 350-seat auditorium, and an employee services center known as Plaza BCP. The building is located in the La Molina district of Lima.

== See also ==
- Yape
