= Hidroaviación =

Peruvian football club

- Full name: Club Escuela de Hidroaviación
- Founded: 1924
- Dissolved: 1932; 94 years ago
- Ground: Estadio Nacional; Lima, Peru
- Capacity: 45,000
Home colours

Hidroaviación was a Peruvian football club that was located in the city of Ancón, Lima.

== History ==
Hidroaviación, also known as Escuela de Hidroaviación, was a Peruvian football club based in Ancón, Lima. Founded under the name Club Hidroaviación, it competed in the Peruvian Primera División from 1929 to 1931. In its debut season in 1929, the club achieved a notable third-place finish in the national championship.

In 1931, the club finished ninth in the aggregate standings, which forced it to compete in the relegation playoff to retain its top-flight status, alongside Circolo Sportivo Italiano, Lawn Tennis, and Ciclista Lima. This playoff also included the four best teams from the 1931 Peruvian División Intermedia: Juventud Perú, Sport Progreso, Miguel Grau, and Sucre. Escuela de Hidroaviación secured its place in the top division by finishing among the top four teams. However, it did not participate in the 1932 season, which ultimately led to its dissolution.

It is worth noting that in 1927, the club’s facilities in Ancón were used as a training base for the Peruvian national team following the arrival of Uruguayan coach Pedro Olivieri. Additionally, in 1929, the club took part in the 1928 Campeonato Nacional de Fútbol Amateur, representing the Armada Peruana (Peruvian Navy).

During this period, in 1932, the club won the Copa Uruguay after defeating Alianza Frigorífico Nacional by a score of 4–1.

== Honours ==
=== Senior titles ===
Keys

- Record
- ^{(s)} Shared record

Type	Competition	Titles	Runner-up	Winning years	Runner-up years
National (Cups)	Copa Uruguay	2	—	1928, 1931–32	—

== See also ==
- List of football clubs in Peru
- Peruvian football league system
