= Top-ups =

Type of stock repurchase program

In business, a top-up is a variation of a company's stock repurchase program for common shareholders. Although this buyback reduces voting interest of its shareholder, the shareholder may subsequently increase its holdings, called a top-up. For example, if company A holds 20% of voting power, and company B reduces this power to 10%, company A may increase its voting power to 15% within 6 months.

In the event of a hostile takeover attempt, a target company can use a top-up to increase time for enhancing takeover defenses.

== See also ==
- Economics
- Mergers and Acquisitions
- Microeconomics
- Takeover
- Industrial organization
