= 2026 Copa de la Liga (Peru) =

Copa de la Liga Caliente 2026

Tournament details
- Country: Peru
- Dates: 11 June – 15 November 2026
- Teams: 34

Final positions
- Champions: Sporting Cristal (1st title)
- Runners-up: Alianza Atlético

Tournament statistics
- Matches played: 57
- Goals scored: 168 (2.95 per match)

The 2026 Copa de la Liga (known as the Copa Caliente de la Liga 2026 for sponsorship reasons) was the 1st edition of the Copa de la Liga, the domestic football cup competition of Peru. The tournament was contested by the 34 teams of the Liga 1 and Liga 2, and was held from 11 June to 15 November 2026.

On May 14, the group stage draw was held, during which it was also announced that the champion would receive a cash prize and two bonus points for the 2027 Liga 1 season, as well as qualify for the 2027 Supercopa Peruana.

Sporting Cristal defeated Alianza Atlético 2–0 in the final after extra time to win the tournament's inaugural title.

== Format ==
The Copa de la Liga was played between the 18 teams of the Liga 1 and 16 teams of the Liga 2. The competition began with a group stage phase in which the 34 participating teams were divided into eight groups of four or three. The top two teams of each group advanced to the knockout stage, beginning with the round of 16 and leading up to the final.

== Schedule ==
Round	Draw date	Dates
Group stage	14 May	11–29 June 2026
Knockout stage	No draw	10 July – 15 November 2026

== Teams ==
The 34 teams that will take part in the competition include: all eighteen teams of the Liga 1; sixteen teams of the Liga 2. Initially, seventeen teams of the Liga 2 were going to participate until San Marcos retired from the league. Sport Huancayo II is ineligible to participate, as it is the reserve team of Sport Huancayo.

=== Liga 1 ===
- ADT
- Alianza Atlético
- Alianza Lima
- Atlético Grau
- Cajamarca
- Cienciano
- Comerciantes Unidos
- Cusco
- Deportivo Garcilaso
- Deportivo Moquegua
- Juan Pablo II College
- Los Chankas
- Melgar
- Sport Boys
- Sport Huancayo
- Sporting Cristal
- Universitario
- UTC

=== Liga 2 ===
- Academia Cantolao
- ADA
- Ayacucho
- Bentín Tacna Heroica
- Binacional
- Carlos A. Mannucci
- Comerciantes
- Deportivo Coopsol
- Deportivo Llacuabamba
- Estudiantil CNI
- Pirata
- Santos
- Unión Comercio
- Unión Minas
- Universidad César Vallejo
- Universidad de San Martín

== Group stage ==
=== Group A ===
Pos	Team	Pld	W	D	L	GF	GA	GD	Pts	Qualification	AAS	CAM	ALI	UCV
1	Alianza Atlético	3	3	0	0	5	1	+4	9	Round of 16				2–0
2	Carlos A. Mannucci	3	2	0	1	6	4	+2	6	Round of 16	0–1		3–1	
3	Alianza Lima	3	0	1	2	2	5	−3	1		1–2			
4	Universidad César Vallejo	3	0	1	2	2	5	−3	1			2–3	0–0	

Legend: Blue = home team win; Yellow = draw; Red = away team win.

==== Results ====
13 June 2026	Carlos A. Mannucci	0–1	Alianza Atlético	Estadio Mansiche, Trujillo
13:15			Mariano Barreda 81'	Referee: Chamber Bautista

14 June 2026	Universidad César Vallejo	0–0	Alianza Lima	Estadio César Acuña Peralta, Trujillo
15:30				Referee: Walter Guadalupe

19 June 2026	Alianza Atlético	2–0	Universidad César Vallejo	Estadio Campeones del 36, Sullana
15:30	Cristian Penilla 65'; Erick Perleche 82'			Referee: Wilmer Villanueva

20 June 2026	Carlos A. Mannucci	3–1	Alianza Lima	Estadio Mansiche, Trujillo
20:00	Alejandro Montalva 45+2'; David Chicoma 77'; Gilmar Rodríguez 84'		Stefano Olaya 82'	Referee: Julio Lecca

28 June 2026	Universidad César Vallejo	2–3	Carlos A. Mannucci	Estadio César Acuña Peralta, Trujillo
13:00	Matías Canahualpa 45'; Miguel Cornejo 57'		Eduardo Caballero 30'; Koichi Aparicio 35'; José Muñóz 78'	Referee: Robin Segura

28 June 2026	Alianza Lima	1–2	Alianza Atlético	Estadio Hugo Sotil, Lima
13:00	Diego Hidalgo 90'		Guillermo Larios 2'; Cristian Penilla 49'	Referee: Milagros Arruela

=== Group B ===
Pos	Team	Pld	W	D	L	GF	GA	GD	Pts	Qualification	ADA	JUA	COM
1	ADA	2	1	1	0	2	0	+2	4	Round of 16			2–0
2	Juan Pablo II College	2	0	2	0	0	0	0	2		0–0		
3	Comerciantes Unidos	2	0	1	1	0	2	−2	1			0–0	

Legend: Blue = home team win; Yellow = draw; Red = away team win.

==== Results ====
11 June 2026	ADA	2–0	Comerciantes Unidos	Estadio Víctor Montoya Segura, Jaén
15:00	Facundo Rodríguez 54' 89'			Referee: Jorge Peñafiel

20 June 2026	Juan Pablo II College	0–0	ADA	Complejo Juan Pablo II, Chongoyape
15:30				Referee: Abimelec Rojas

27 June 2026	Comerciantes Unidos	0–0	Juan Pablo II College	Estadio Juan Maldonado Gamarra, Cutervo
13:00				Referee: Brandon Torrecilla

=== Group C ===
Pos	Team	Pld	W	D	L	GF	GA	GD	Pts	Qualification	UTC	LLA	CAJ
1	UTC	2	1	1	0	5	3	+2	4	Round of 16			3–1
2	Deportivo Llacuabamba	2	0	2	0	3	3	0	2		2–2		
3	Cajamarca	2	0	1	1	2	4	−2	1			1–1	

Legend: Blue = home team win; Yellow = draw; Red = away team win.

==== Results ====
15 June 2026	Deportivo Llacuabamba	2–2	UTC	Estadio Municipal de Huamachuco, Huamachuco
13:00	Maximiliano Zárate 49'; Anthony Osorio 90+5'		David Camacho 57'; Marcos Lliuya 82'	Referee: Micke Palomino

20 June 2026	Cajamarca	1–1	Deportivo Llacuabamba	Estadio Héroes de San Ramón, Cajamarca
13:15	Fernando Ocas 79'		Diego Sánchez 53'	Referee: Jordan Casas

26 June 2026	UTC	3–1	Cajamarca	Estadio Héroes de San Ramón, Cajamarca
13:00	Luis Garro 38'; David Camacho 50' 69'		Carlos Meza 66'	Referee: Javier Casanova

=== Group D ===
Pos	Team	Pld	W	D	L	GF	GA	GD	Pts	Qualification	GRA	PIR	UNI
1	Atlético Grau	2	1	1	0	4	3	+1	4	Round of 16		3–2	
2	Pirata	2	1	0	1	4	3	+1	3				2–0
3	Universitario	2	0	1	1	1	3	−2	1		1–1		

Legend: Blue = home team win; Yellow = draw; Red = away team win.

==== Results ====
12 June 2026	Pirata	2–0	Universitario	Estadio Mansiche, Trujillo
20:00	Joaquín Verde 69' (o.g.); Leonardo Carrillo 84'			Referee: Junior Rivera

22 June 2026	Atlético Grau	3–2	Pirata	Estadio Municipal de La Matanza, Piura
15:15	Yamir Ruidíaz 8'; Henri Villegas 22'; Raul Ruidíaz 69' (pen.)		Pedro Diez Canseco 83'; Cristhian Santos 85'	Referee: Jhon Viteri

26 June 2026	Universitario	1–1	Atlético Grau	Estadio Monumental "U", Lima
18:00	Adrián Cáceres 4'		Yamir Ruidíaz 48' (pen.)	Referee: Jonathan Zamora

=== Group E ===
Pos	Team	Pld	W	D	L	GF	GA	GD	Pts	Qualification	HUA	ADT	AUH	UMI
1	Sport Huancayo	3	2	1	0	4	2	+2	7	Round of 16		1–0		
2	ADT	3	1	1	1	3	2	+1	4	Round of 16			3–1	
3	Alianza Universidad	3	1	1	1	5	5	0	4		1–1			3–1
4	Unión Minas	3	0	1	2	2	5	−3	1		1–2	0–0		

Legend: Blue = home team win; Yellow = draw; Red = away team win.

==== Results ====
12 June 2026	Unión Minas	0–0	ADT	Estadio Huancayo, Huancayo
13:00				Referee: Luis Ciriaco

14 June 2026	Alianza Universidad	1–1	Sport Huancayo	Estadio Heraclio Tapia, Huánuco
13:15	Héctor Zeta 90+3'		Nahuel Luján 76'	Referee: Robin Segura

19 June 2026	ADT	3–1	Alianza Universidad	Estadio Unión Tarma, Tarma
13:00	Aylton Mazzo 7'; Joao Rojas 24'; Hideyoshi Arakaki 88'		Anghelo Flores 39'	Referee: Walter Guadalupe

21 June 2026	Unión Minas	1–2	Sport Huancayo	Estadio Huancayo, Huancayo
13:15	Denylson Chávez 11'		Jean Franco Falconí 44'; Franco Caballero 71'	Referee: Mario Quispe

26 June 2026	Alianza Universidad	3–1	Unión Minas	Estadio Heraclio Tapia, Huánuco
15:15	Abel Casquette 28'; Héctor Zeta 67'; Jhojan Domínguez 84'		Denylson Chávez 61'	Referee: Gustavo Huamán

26 June 2026	Sport Huancayo	1–0	ADT	Estadio Huancayo, Huancayo
15:15	Edu Villar 32'			Referee: Eric Pulache

=== Group F ===
Pos	Team	Pld	W	D	L	GF	GA	GD	Pts	Qualification	CIE	GAR	BIN	CUS
1	Cienciano	3	3	0	0	6	2	+4	9	Round of 16		2–1		
2	Deportivo Garcilaso	3	1	1	1	5	3	+2	4	Round of 16			4–1	0–0
3	Binacional	3	1	0	2	5	9	−4	3		0–2			4–3
4	Cusco	3	0	1	2	4	6	−2	1		1–2			

Legend: Blue = home team win; Yellow = draw; Red = away team win.

==== Results ====
13 June 2026	Binacional	0–2	Cienciano	Estadio Guillermo Briceño Rosamedina, Juliaca
18:30			Nadhir Colunga 60'; Santiago Arias 88'	Referee: Lenin Montalbán

14 June 2026	Deportivo Garcilaso	0–0	Cusco	Estadio Garcilaso, Cusco
18:00				Referee: Gerson Villamar

21 June 2026	Cienciano	2–1	Deportivo Garcilaso	Estadio Garcilaso, Cusco
18:00	Kevin Becerra 33'; Alejandro Hohberg 54' (pen.)		Francisco Arancibia 27'	Referee: Alexander Blas

22 June 2026	Binacional	4–3	Cusco	Estadio Guillermo Briceño Rosamedina, Juliaca
13:00	Tarek Carranza 30' (pen.) 45+1' 88'; Rodrigo Rodríguez 51'		Sergio Quillahuamán 13' 22'; Saúl Tairo 90+3'	Referee: Junior Goyzueta

28 June 2026	Cusco	1–2	Cienciano	Estadio Garcilaso, Cusco
18:00	Juan Tévez 17'		Nadhir Colunga 13'; Carlos Garcés 49'	Referee: Francisco Ramos

29 June 2026	Deportivo Garcilaso	4–1	Binacional	Estadio Garcilaso, Cusco
15:15	Joao Mendoza 12'; Christopher Olivares 14' 49'; Adrián Ascues 53'		Jordy Santa María 31'	Referee: Gerson Villamar

=== Group G ===
Pos	Team	Pld	W	D	L	GF	GA	GD	Pts	Qualification	CHA	SAN	AYA
1	Los Chankas	2	2	0	0	4	0	+4	6	Round of 16		3–0	
2	Santos	2	1	0	1	2	4	−2	3				2–1
3	Ayacucho	2	0	0	2	1	3	−2	0		0–1		

Legend: Blue = home team win; Yellow = draw; Red = away team win.

==== Results ====
14 June 2026	Ayacucho	0–1	Los Chankas	Estadio Las Américas, Ayacucho
11:00			Juan Ospina 34'	Referee: Maikol Farromeque

21 June 2026	Santos	2–1	Ayacucho	Estadio Municipal de Nasca, Nazca
15:00	Luis Aguirre 46'; Gerardo Quiroz 83'		Johan Gonzales 87'	Referee: Renzo Arias

28 June 2026	Los Chankas	3–0	Santos	Estadio Los Chankas, Andahuaylas
15:15	Jarlin Quintero 20'; Félix Espinoza 45+1' 51'			Referee: Kevin Maxdeo

=== Group H ===
Pos	Team	Pld	W	D	L	GF	GA	GD	Pts	Qualification	MOQ	BEN	MEL
1	Deportivo Moquegua	2	1	1	0	3	2	+1	4	Round of 16		3–2	
2	Bentín Tacna Heroica	2	1	0	1	5	5	0	3				3–2
3	Melgar	2	0	1	1	2	3	−1	1		0–0		

Legend: Blue = home team win; Yellow = draw; Red = away team win.

==== Results ====
12 June 2026	Bentín Tacna Heroica	3–2	Melgar	Estadio Jorge Basadre, Tacna
15:15	Julber Linares 3'; Fernando López 15' 59'		Jefferson Cáceres 29'; Alejandro Ramos 82' (pen.)	Referee: Kevin Maxdeo

21 June 2026	Deportivo Moquegua	3–2	Bentín Tacna Heroica	Estadio 25 de Noviembre, Moquegua
11:00	Roger Torres 1'; Marcello Negrón 3'; Edgar Lastre 83'		Fernando López 38' 44'	Referee: Carlos Miranda

29 June 2026	Melgar	0–0	Deportivo Moquegua	Estadio 25 de Noviembre, Moquegua
13:00				Referee: Julio Quiroz

=== Group I ===
Pos	Team	Pld	W	D	L	GF	GA	GD	Pts	Qualification	SBA	CAN	USM
1	Sport Boys	2	1	1	0	5	2	+3	4	Round of 16		3–0	
2	Academia Cantolao	2	1	0	1	4	6	−2	3				4–3
3	Universidad de San Martín	2	0	1	1	6	6	0	1		2–2		

Legend: Blue = home team win; Yellow = draw; Red = away team win.

==== Results ====
13 June 2026	Universidad de San Martín	2–2	Sport Boys	Estadio Hugo Sotil, Lima
11:00	Sebastián Sánchez 6'; Austing Arteaga 84'		Rolando Díaz 47'; Carlos López 71'	Referee: Javier Casanova

20 June 2026	Academia Cantolao	4–3	Universidad de San Martín	Estadio Hugo Sotil, Lima
11:00	Alan Olmedo 23'; Luis Carranza 27'; Francesco Lara 68' 78'		Rodrigo Cuba 45+3'; Valentín Sánchez 87'; Kevin Sánchez 90+6' (pen.)	Referee: Roberto Benavides

27 June 2026	Sport Boys	3–0	Academia Cantolao	Estadio Miguel Grau, Callao
18:30	Mathías Llontop 49'; Hernán da Campo 79'; Luciano Nequecaur 82'			Referee: Wuilder Espinoza

=== Group J ===
Pos	Team	Pld	W	D	L	GF	GA	GD	Pts	Qualification	CRI	COM	UCO	CNI
1	Sporting Cristal	3	2	1	0	5	2	+3	7	Round of 16			2–0	
2	Comerciantes	3	1	2	0	2	1	+1	5	Round of 16	1–1			0–0
3	Unión Comercio	3	1	0	2	3	4	−1	3			0–1		
4	Estudiantil CNI	3	0	1	2	2	5	−3	1		1–2		1–3	

Legend: Blue = home team win; Yellow = draw; Red = away team win.

==== Results ====
13 June 2026	Comerciantes	1–1	Sporting Cristal	Villa Emprendedora CFC, Iquitos
15:30	Antonio Acosta 49'		Jair Morettin 43'	Referee: James Huamaní

15 June 2026	Estudiantil CNI	1–3	Unión Comercio	Estadio Municipal La Gran Saposoa, Saposoa
15:15	Diego Cuadros 90+2'		Breidy Goluz 37'; Emiliano Álvarez 57'; Alessandro Pinedo 84'	Referee: Brandon Torrecilla

20 June 2026	Unión Comercio	0–1	Comerciantes	Estadio Carlos Vidaurre García, Tarapoto
15:00			Chase Villanueva 86'	Referee: Jonathan Chirinos

21 June 2026	Estudiantil CNI	1–2	Sporting Cristal	Estadio Carlos Vidaurre García, Tarapoto
15:30	Edgar Santillán 66'		Gabriel Santana 56'; Ian Wisdom 78'	Referee: César García

27 June 2026	Comerciantes	0–0	Estudiantil CNI	Villa Emprendedora CFC, Iquitos
15:15				Referee: Micke Palomino

27 June 2026	Sporting Cristal	2–0	Unión Comercio	Estadio Alberto Gallardo, Lima
15:15	Martín Távara 50'; Irven Ávila 76'			Referee: Miguel Díaz

=== Ranking of second-placed teams ===
Pos	Team	Pld	W	D	L	GF	GA	GD	Pts	Qualification
1	Pirata	2	1	0	1	4	3	+1	3	Round of 16
2	Bentín Tacna Heroica	2	1	0	1	5	5	0	3	Round of 16
3	Academia Cantolao	2	1	0	1	4	6	−2	3	
4	Santos	2	1	0	1	2	4	−2	3	
5	Deportivo Llacuabamba	2	0	2	0	3	3	0	2	
6	Juan Pablo II College	2	0	2	0	0	0	0	2	

== Final Rounds ==
=== Bracket ===
First round
Alianza Atlético	3
Pirata	2
UTC	4
ADA	1
Atlético Grau	1 (8)
Carlos A. Mannucci	1 (7)
Sport Boys	1
Comerciantes	0
Sporting Cristal	1 (4)
Bentín Tacna Heroica	1 (3)
Sport Huancayo	3
Los Chankas	1
Cienciano	2
ADT	3
Deportivo Moquegua	0 (4)
Deportivo Garcilaso	0 (2)

Quarter-finals
Alianza Atlético	1 (5)
UTC	1 (4)
Atlético Grau	2 (3)
Sport Boys	2 (4)
Sporting Cristal	4
Sport Huancayo	1
ADT	2
Deportivo Moquegua	0

Semi-finals
Alianza Atlético	5	3	8
Sport Boys	2	0	2
Sporting Cristal	1	5	6
ADT	0	0	0

Final
Alianza Atlético	0
Sporting Cristal	2

=== Round of 16 ===
9 July 2026	Atlético Grau	1–1 (8–7 p)	Carlos A. Mannucci	Estadio Municipal de La Matanza, Piura
15:00	Gerson Valladares 16' (o.g.)		Rely Fernández 45+1'	Referee: Augusto Menéndez
	Penalties
	Patricio Alvarez (penalty scored); Yamir Ruidiaz (penalty scored); Ignacio Tapia (penalty scored); Rafael Guarderas (penalty scored); Pablo Lavandeira (penalty missed); Gabriel Alfaro (penalty scored); Adrián de la Cruz (penalty scored); Rodrigo Tapia (penalty scored); Paulo de la Cruz (penalty scored)		Koichi Aparicio (penalty scored); Joaquin Aguirre (penalty scored); Jose Muñoz (penalty scored); Jorge Ríos (penalty missed); Javier Núñez (penalty scored); Eduardo Caballero (penalty scored); Alfredo Solar (penalty scored); Luis Alvarez (penalty scored); Juan Olano (penalty missed)

10 July 2026	Cienciano	2–3	ADT	Estadio Garcilaso, Cusco
13:00	Alejandro Hohberg 50'; Carlos Garces 59'		Joao Rojas 2'; Jonatan Bauman 2'; Jhojan Garcilazo 45'	Referee: Bruno Pérez

10 July 2026	Alianza Atlético	3–2	Pirata	Estadio Campeones del 36, Sullana
15:30	Jimmy Pérez 4'; Valentin Robaldo 69' 78'		Kevin Lugo 20'; Flavio Fernández 88'	Referee: Daniel Ureta

10 July 2026	Sport Boys	1–0	Comerciantes	Estadio Miguel Grau, Callao
20:00	Luis Urruti 73'			Referee: Jesús Cartagena

11 July 2026	Sport Huancayo	3–1	Los Chankas	Estadio Huancayo, Huancayo
13:00	Piero Magallanes 54'; Diego Carabano 70'; Franco Caballero 90'		Félix Espinoza 87'	Referee: Micke Palomino

11 July 2026	Sporting Cristal	1–1 (5–4 p)	Bentín Tacna Heroica	Estadio Alberto Gallardo, Lima
15:30	Hernán Barcos 47'		Julio García 40'	Referee: Jordi Espinoza
	Penalties
	Gabriel Santana (penalty scored); Martín Távara (penalty scored); Cristiano Da Silva (penalty missed); Irven Ávila (penalty scored); Catriel Cabellos (penalty scored); Leandro Sosa Toranza (penalty scored)		Fernando Beltrame (penalty scored); Alexander García (penalty missed); José López (penalty scored); Fraivan López (penalty scored); José Inga (penalty scored); Jefferson Mendoz (penalty missed)

12 July 2026	Deportivo Moquegua	0–0 (4–2 p)	Deportivo Garcilaso	Estadio 25 de Noviembre, Moquegua
13:00				Referee: Diego Haro
	Penalties
	Nicolás Chávez (penalty scored); Bryan Angulo (penalty scored); Yorman Zapata (penalty scored); Nicolás Amasifuén (penalty scored)		Carlos Ramos (penalty scored); Christopher Olivares (penalty missed); Erick Canales (penalty scored); Lucas Ríos (penalty missed)

12 July 2026	UTC	4–1	ADA	Estadio Héroes de San Ramón, Cajamarca
15:30	David Camacho 21'; Adolfo Muñoz 32'; Marcos Lliuya 42'; Fabrian Caytuiro 75' (o.g.)		Facundo Rodríguez 12'	Referee: Junior Rivera

=== Quarterfinals ===
25 August 2026	Alianza Atlético	1–1 (5–4 p)	UTC	Estadio Campeones del 36, Sullana
15:00	Franchesco Flores 21'		Adolfo Muñoz 15'	Referee: Rudy Méndez
	Penalties
	José Luján (penalty scored); Jesús Mendieta (penalty scored); Ariel Muñoz (penalty scored); Germán Diaz (penalty missed); Jorge Del Castillo (penalty scored); Williams Guzmán (penalty missed); Joel Lupú (penalty scored)		Marcos Lliuya (penalty scored); Abdiel Arroyo (penalty scored); David Dioses (penalty scored); Manuel Ganoza (penalty scored); Francesco Cavagna (penalty missed); Jhosep Núñez (penalty missed); Santiago Gálvez (penalty missed)

26 August 2026	Sporting Cristal	4–1	Sport Huancayo	Estadio Alberto Gallardo, Lima
15:00	Irven Ávila 43'; Maxloren Castro 46'; Catriel Cabellos 59' 81'		Aldo Quiñonez 24'	Referee: Sebastián Lozano

26 August 2026	Atlético Grau	2–2 (3–4 p)	Sport Boys	Estadio Municipal de La Matanza, Piura
15:00	Ignacio Tapia 35'; Yamir Ruidíaz 60'		Rolando Diaz 49'; Hernán Da Campo 90'	Attendance: Alexander Blas
	Penalties
	Yamir Ruidíaz (penalty scored); Gabriel Alfaro (penalty scored); Ignacio Tapia (penalty scored); Mauro Da Luz (penalty missed); Pablo Lavandeira (penalty missed)		Yuriel Celi (penalty scored); Nicolas Da Campo (penalty scored); Jose Davey (penalty scored); Gustavo Dulanto (penalty scored)

27 August 2026	ADT	2–0	Deportivo Moquegua	Estadio Unión Tarma, Tarma
15:00	José Leonardo Rugel 5'; Jhojan Garcilazo 88'			Referee: Daniel Ureta

=== Semifinals ===
==== First leg ====
27 September 2026	Sport Boys	2–5	Alianza Atlético	Estadio Miguel Grau, Callao
13:00	José María Davey 3'; Rolando Díaz 42'		José María Ingratti 12'; Román Suárez 28'; Ariel Muñoz 36' 66'; Cristian Penilla 90+4'	Referee: Joel Alarcón

27 September 2026	ADT	0–1	Sporting Cristal	Estadio Unión Tarma, Tarma
15:15			Gabriel Santana 14'	Referee: Alexander Blas

==== Second leg ====
1 October 2026	Sporting Cristal	5–0	ADT	Estadio Alberto Gallardo, Lima
15:00	Michael Hoyos 19'; Santiago González 45' 86'; Leandro Sosa 62'; Catriel Cabellos 72'			Referee: Diego Haro

5 October 2026	Alianza Atlético	3–0	Sport Boys	Estadio Campeones del 36, Sullana
15:00	Williams Guzmán 22'; Joel Hernán Lupú 74'; Erick Perleche 89'			Referee: Micke Palomino

=== Final ===
15 November 2026	Sporting Cristal	2–0 (a.e.t.)	Alianza Atlético	Estadio Mansiche, Trujillo, Peru
17:00	Rafael Lutiger 94'; Santiago González 114'			Referee: Michael Espinoza

== Top goalscorers ==
Rank	Name	Club	Goals
1	(Colombia) David Camacho	UTC	4
1	(Uruguay) Fernando López	Bentín Tacna Heroica	4
3	(Peru) Tarek Carranza	Binacional	3
3	(Peru) Félix Espinoza	Los Chankas	3
3	(Uruguay) Facundo Rodríguez	ADA	3
3	(Peru) Yamir Ruidiaz	Atlético Grau	3
3	(Peru) Rolando Díaz	Sport Boys	3
3	(Ecuador) Cristian Penilla	Alianza Atlético	3
3	(Argentina) (Peru) Catriel Cabellos	Sporting Cristal	3
3	(Argentina) Santiago González	Sporting Cristal	3
11	(Peru) Alejandro Hohberg	Cienciano	2
11	(Ecuador) Carlos Garcés	Cienciano	2
11	(Peru) Christopher Olivares	Deportivo Garcilaso	2
11	(Argentina) Valentín Robaldo	Alianza Atlético	2
11	(Peru) Denylson Chávez	Unión Minas	2
11	(Ecuador) Joao Rojas	ADT	2
11	(Peru) Jhojan Garcilazo	ADT	2
11	(Argentina) Hernán Da Campo	Sport Boys	2
11	(Argentina) Franco Caballero	Sport Huancayo	2
11	(Ecuador) Adolfo Muñoz	UTC	2
11	(Argentina) Ariel Muñoz	Alianza Atlético	2
11	(Brazil) Gabriel Santana	Sporting Cristal	2

== See also ==
- 2026 Liga 1
- 2026 Liga 2
