= Campeonato Nacional de Fútbol Amateur (Peru) =

Football competition in Peru

- Founded: 1928
- Folded: 1980; 46 years ago
- Region: Peru

The Campeonato Nacional de Fútbol Amateur also called the Campeonato Nacional, it was an official Peruvian football competition created and then organized by the Peruvian Football Federation, it was played until the 1963 season. It was practically an interleague tournament, in which the provincial teams from the different departments that made up the Inca nation participated and also that depended on the Peruvian Federation. It was really the first great National Tournament held in football in Peru.

The champion received the Copa Presidente, donated by the President of the Republic Óscar Benavides.

Until the 1937 edition, the football players of the First Division teams belonging to those cities participated in the tournament representing Lima and Callao. Between the 1939 and 1944 editions both cities participated forming a single selection. In the following tournaments, the teams from Lima and Callao were made up of players from their respective amateur leagues.

Towards the mid-1960s, the tournament gradually lost interest from the fans due to the inclusion of clubs representing the teams from other regions of Peru, the Torneo Descentralizado were born in 1966, then with the project of Víctor Nagaro Bianchi, as head of the Consejo Nacional del Deporte equivalent to what is currently the Instituto Peruano del Deporte appointed in 1965 by President Fernando Belaúnde Terry during his first government, whose idea was to emulate the decentralized tournaments of that time in Italy and France where the entire country.

== Champions ==
Ed.	Season	Champion	Runner-up
1	1928	Lima; Callao	Arequipa
2	1932	Arequipa; Lima; Callao	—
3	1935	(Department of Piura) Sullana	Lima
4	1937	Callao	(Department of Lambayeque) Chiclayo
5	1939	Lima–Callao	(Ica Region) Ica
6	1942	Lima–Callao	(La Libertad Region) Chicama
7	1944	Lima–Callao	(Ica Region) Ica
8	1946	(Ica Region) Ica	(Department of Lambayeque) Chiclayo
9	1952	(La Libertad Region) Trujillo	Arequipa
10	1953	Arequipa	(Ica Region) Ica
11	1954	(Department of Piura) Talara	(Ica Region) Ica
12	1955	(Lima) Huacho	(Department of Piura) Talara
13	1956	Arequipa	(Department of Lambayeque) Lambayeque
14	1958	(Department of Piura) Talara	(Ica Region) Ica
15	1960	(Department of Piura) Piura	(Junín Region) Huancayo
16	1963	Huancavelica	(Lima) Cañete
17	1980	(Department of Tacna) Tacna	(Department of Piura) Piura

== Titles by region ==
Rank	Club	Winners	Runners-up	Winning years	Runners-up years
1	Arequipa	3	2	1932, 1953, 1956	1928, 1952
1	Callao	3	—	1928, 1932, 1937	—
1	Lima–Callao	3	—	1939, 1942, 1944	—
2	Lima	2	1	1928, 1932	1935
2	(Department of Piura) Talara	2	1	1954, 1958	1955
3	(Ica Region) Ica	1	5	1946	1939, 1944, 1953, 1954, 1958
3	(Department of Piura) Piura	1	1	1960	1980
3	(Lima) Huacho	1	—	1955	—
3	Huancavelica	1	—	1963	—
3	(Department of Piura) Sullana	1	—	1935	—
3	(Department of Tacna) Tacna	1	—	1980	—
3	(La Libertad Region) Trujillo	1	—	1952	—
—	(Department of Lambayeque) Chiclayo	—	2	—	1937, 1946
—	(Lima) Cañete	—	1	—	1963
—	(La Libertad Region) Chicama	—	1	—	1942
—	(Junín Region) Huancayo	—	1	—	1960
—	(Department of Lambayeque) Lambayeque	—	1	—	1956

== 1928 Campeonato Nacional de Fútbol Amateur ==
=== Preliminar Stage ===
Team 1	Score	Team 2
(Lima) Chancay	3–2	(Lima) Canta
(Lima) Armada Nacional	7–1	(Department of Huánuco) Huánuco
(Ica Region) Ica	1–1	(Department of Lambayeque) Lambayeque
(La Libertad Region) La Libertad	5–3	Cusco
Arequipa	5–1	(Department of Junín) Junín
Puno	4–2	Huancavelica

==== Extra match ====
Team 1	Score	Team 2
(Ica Region) Ica	2–0	(Department of Lambayeque) Lambayeque

==== Consolation match ====
Team 1	Score	Team 2
(Department of Junín) Junín	2–0	Huancavelica

=== Second Stage ===
Team 1	Score	Team 2
Arequipa	4–3	(La Libertad Region) La Libertad
(Lima) Armada Nacional	1–2	Callao
(Ica Region) Ica	3–2	Puno
Lima	4–2	(Lima) Chancay

=== Final Stage ===
Pos	Team	Pld	W	D	L	GF	GA	GD	Pts	Qualification or relegation	Lima	Callao	Arequipa	(Ica Region) Ica
1	Lima	3	2	1	0	13	3	+10	5	Champion		2–2	4–0	7–1
2	Callao	3	2	1	0	12	4	+8	5	Champion			7–1	
3	Arequipa	3	1	0	2	7	13	−6	2					6–2
4	(Ica Region) Ica	3	0	0	3	4	16	−12	0			1–3		

Updated to match(es) played on unknown. Source:
Legend: Blue = home team win; Yellow = draw; Red = away team win.

== 1932 Campeonato Nacional de Fútbol Amateur ==
=== Final Stage ===
Pos	Team	Pld	W	D	L	GF	GA	GD	Pts	Qualification or relegation	Callao	Lima	Arequipa
1	Callao	2	1	0	1	6	4	+2	2	Champions		1–2	
2	Lima	2	1	0	1	3	3	0	2	Champions			1–2
3	Arequipa	2	1	0	1	4	6	−2	2	Champions	2–5		

Updated to match(es) played on unknown. Source:
Legend: Blue = home team win; Yellow = draw; Red = away team win.

== 1935 Campeonato Nacional de Fútbol Amateur ==
=== Final Stage ===
Pos	Team	Pld	W	D	L	GF	GA	GD	Pts	Qualification or relegation	(Department of Piura) Sullana	Lima	(Arequipa) Islay	(La Libertad Region) Chicama
1	(Department of Piura) Sullana	3	1	2	0	4	3	+1	4	Champion		3–2		0–0
2	Lima	3	1	1	1	8	6	+2	3				5–2	
3	(Arequipa) Islay	3	1	1	1	5	6	−1	3		1–1			2–0
4	(La Libertad Region) Chicama	3	0	2	1	1	3	−2	2			1–1		

Updated to match(es) played on unknown. Source:
Legend: Blue = home team win; Yellow = draw; Red = away team win.

== 1937 Campeonato Nacional de Fútbol Amateur ==
=== Final Stage ===
Pos	Team	Pld	W	D	L	GF	GA	GD	Pts	Qualification or relegation	Callao	(Department of Lambayeque) Chiclayo	(La Libertad Region) Chicama	Lima
1	Callao	3	2	1	0	11	5	+6	5	Champion		4–4		
2	(Department of Lambayeque) Chiclayo	3	1	1	1	8	9	−1	3				4–2	
3	(La Libertad Region) Chicama	3	1	0	2	3	8	−5	2		1–4			W.O.
4	Lima	3	1	0	2	3	3	0	2		0–3	3–0		

Updated to match(es) played on unknown. Source:
Legend: Blue = home team win; Yellow = draw; Red = away team win.

== 1942 Campeonato Nacional de Fútbol Amateur ==
=== Final Stage ===
Pos	Team	Pld	W	D	L	GF	GA	GD	Pts	Qualification or relegation	Lima–Callao	(La Libertad Region) Chicama	(Department of Piura) Talara	Arequipa	(Department of Junín) La Oroya
1	Lima–Callao	4	3	1	0	8	1	+7	7	Champion		5–0	3–0		
2	(La Libertad Region) Chicama	4	3	0	1	16	9	+7	6				4–0		9–2
3	(Department of Piura) Talara	4	2	0	2	10	8	+2	4					2–1	8–0
4	Arequipa	4	1	0	3	8	10	−2	2		2–3	2–3			
5	(Department of Junín) La Oroya	4	0	0	4	4	28	−24	0		0–8			2–3	

Updated to match(es) played on unknown. Source:
Legend: Blue = home team win; Yellow = draw; Red = away team win.

== 1953 Campeonato Nacional de Fútbol Amateur ==
=== Final Stage ===
Pos	Team	Pld	W	D	L	GF	GA	GD	Pts	Qualification or relegation	Arequipa	(Ica Region) Ica	(Department of Lambayeque) Lambayeque
1	Arequipa	2	2	0	0	5	1	+4	4	Champion		3–0	
2	(Ica Region) Ica	1	0	0	1	0	3	−3	0				—
3	(Department of Lambayeque) Lambayeque	1	0	0	1	1	2	−1	0		1–2		

Updated to match(es) played on unknown. Source:
Legend: Blue = home team win; Yellow = draw; Red = away team win.

== 1954 Campeonato Nacional de Fútbol Amateur ==
=== Final Stage ===
Pos	Team	Pld	W	D	L	GF	GA	GD	Pts	Qualification or relegation	(Department of Piura) Talara	(Ica Region) Ica	(Loreto Region) Loreto	Lima	Arequipa	(Department of Tacna) Tacna
1	(Department of Piura) Talara	5	3	2	0	10	6	+4	8	Champion		1–1		—	—	
2	(Ica Region) Ica	5	3	1	1	16	8	+8	7					—		—
3	(Loreto Region) Loreto	5	2	1	2	12	12	0	5		—	—				—
4	Lima	5	1	3	1	10	14	−4	5				—		—	2–2
5	Arequipa	5	2	0	3	5	9	−4	4			—	1–0			
6	(Department of Tacna) Tacna	5	0	1	4	10	14	−4	1		—				—	

Updated to match(es) played on unknown. Source:
Legend: Blue = home team win; Yellow = draw; Red = away team win.

== 1956 Campeonato Nacional de Fútbol Amateur ==
=== Final Stage ===
Pos	Team	Pld	W	D	L	GF	GA	GD	Pts	Qualification or relegation
1	Arequipa	6	3	3	0	16	6	+10	9	Champion
2	(Department of Lambayeque) Lambayeque	6	4	1	1	15	10	+5	9	
3	Lima	6	4	1	1	13	9	+4	9	
4	(Department of Piura) Piura	6	1	3	2	5	7	−2	5	
5	Cusco	6	2	0	4	12	13	−1	4	
6	(Ica Region) Ica	6	0	3	3	6	11	−5	3	
7	(Department of Pasco) Pasco	6	0	3	3	6	17	−11	3	

Updated to match(es) played on unknown. Source:
